= List of Sunni books =

This is a list of significant books in the doctrines of Sunni Islam. A classical example of an index of Islamic books can be found in Kitāb al-Fihrist of Ibn Al-Nadim.

== The Qur'an ==
=== Quran ===
==== Qur'anic translations (in English) ====
Some notable & famous quranic translations in English language.

1. Kanzul Iman by Imam Ahmed Raza Khan Barelvi
2. The Noble Qur'an by Dr. Muhammad Muhsin Khan and Shaykh Taqi ud din al Hilali
3. The Meaning of the Glorious Koran by Marmaduke Pickthall
4. The Holy Qur'an: Text, Translation and Commentary by Abdullah Yusuf Ali
5. The Qur'an: A New Translation by Muhammad A. S. Abdel Haleem
6. The Clear Quran: A Thematic English Translation by Dr. Mustafa Khattab
7. The Noble Quran: Meaning With Explanatory Notes by Taqi Usmani

=== Tafsir (Exegesis of the Qur'an) ===
==== Classical Tafsirs ====
1. Tafsir Mujahid by Mujahid ibn Jabr
2. Tafsir al-Tabari by Al-Tabari
3. Tafsir al-Maturidi by Abu Mansur al-Maturidi
4. Tafsir al-Samarqandi by Abu al-Layth al-Samarqandi
5. Tafsir al-Thalabi by Al-Tha'labi
6. Tafsir al-Basit by Al-Wahidi
7. Tafsir al-Wasit by Al-Wahidi
8. Tafsir al-Wajiz by Al-Wahidi
9. Tafsir al-Baghawi by Al-Baghawi
10. Ahkam al-Qur'an by Al-Kiya al-Harrasi
11. Ahkam al-Qur'an by Abu Bakr ibn al-Arabi
12. Tafsir Ibn Atiyya by Ibn 'Atiyya
13. Zad al-Masir fi Ilm al-Tafsir by Ibn al-Jawzi
14. Al-Tafsir al-Kabir (also known as: Mafatih al-Ghayb) by Fakhr al-Din al-Razi
15. Al-Taysir fi al-Tafsir by Abu Hafs Umar an-Nasafi
16. Al-Jami' li-Ahkam al-Qur'an by Al-Qurtubi
17. Madarik al-Tanzil by Abu al-Barakat al-Nasafi
18. Tafsir al-Baydawi by Al-Baydawi
19. Tafsir al-Nisaburi by Nizam al-Din al-Nisaburi
20. Tafsir al-Khazin by 'Ala al-Din al-Khazin
21. Al-Bahr al-Muhit by Abu Hayyan al-Gharnati
22. At-Tahsil li-'Ulumi al-Tanzil by Ibn Juzayy
23. Tafsir ibn Kathir by Ibn Kathir
24. Tafsir al-Jalalayn by Al-Mahalli and Al-Suyuti
25. Dur al-Manthur by Al-Suyuti

==== Modern Tafsirs ====
1. Tafsir Ibn Ajiba by Ahmad ibn Ajiba
2. Ruh al-Ma'ani by Mahmud al-Alusi
3. Risale-i Nur by Bediüzzaman Said Nursi
4. Tafsir Ibn Ashur by Ibn Ashur
5. Al-Tafsir Al-Mawdu'i li-suwar Al-Qur'an al-Karim by Muhammad al-Ghazali
6. Safwat al-Tafasir by Muhammad Ali al-Sabuni

==== Urdu Tafsirs ====
1. Kanzul Iman by Ahmed Raza Khan Barelvi
2. Bayan al-Quran by Ashraf Ali Thanwi
3. Maariful Quran by Muhammad Shafi
4. Tafseer-e-Majidi by Abdul Majid Daryabadi
5. Tafhim-ul-Quran by Abul A'la Maududi
6. Anwar Ul Bayan by Ashiq Ilahi Bulandshahri

=== Quranic Sciences ===
1. Al-Nasikh wa al-Mansukh by Abu Ubaid al-Qasim bin Salam
2. Kitab al-Sabʿa fī al-Qraʾat by Abu Bakr Ibn Mujāhid
3. Asbab al-Nuzul by Al-Wahidi
4. Dala'il al-I'jaz by Abd al-Qahir al-Jurjani
5. Al-Mufradat fi Gharib al-Quran by Al-Raghib al-Isfahani
6. Shatibiyyah by Abu al-Qasim al-Shatibi
7. Muqaddimah fi Usul al-Tafsir by Ibn Taymiyyah
8. Al-Burhan fi ʿUlum al-Qur'an by Al-Zarkashi
9. Mawaqiʿ al-ʿUlum min Mawaqiʿ al-Nujum by Jalal al-Din al-Bulqini
10. Al-Itqan by Al-Suyuti
11. Al-Muqaddima al-Jazariyya by Ibn al-Jazari
12. Tayyibat al-Nashr by Ibn al-Jazari
13. Al-Nashr fi al-Qira'at al-ʿAshr by Ibn al-Jazari
14. Al-Tamhid fi ʿIlm al-Tajwid by Ibn al-Jazari
15. Manahil al-ʿIrfan fi ʿUlum al-Qur'an by Muhammad ʿAbd al-ʿAzim al-Zurqani
16. Al-Fawz al-Kabir by Shah Waliullah Dehlawi

== Hadith ==
=== Kutub al-Sittah (The Six Books) ===
The most authoritative collections of Hadith are called The Six Books.

1. Sahih al-Bukhari - compiled by Muhammad al-Bukhari
2. Sahih Muslim - compiled by Muslim ibn al-Hajjaj
3. Al-Sunan al-Sughra - compiled by Al-Nasa'i
4. Sunan Abi Dawud - compiled by Abu Dawood
5. Sunan al-Tirmidhi - compiled by Al-Tirmidhi
6. Sunan ibn Majah - compiled by Ibn Majah

=== Other primary Hadith collections ===
1. Al-Muwatta of Imam Malik ibn Anas
2. Kitab al-Athar of Muhammad al-Shaybani
3. Musannaf of ‘Abd ar-Razzaq as-San‘ani
4. Musnad of Imam Shafi‘i
5. Musannaf of Ibn Abi Shaybah
6. Musnad of Ishaq Ibn Rahwayh
7. Musnad of Imam Ahmad ibn Hanbal
8. Sunan of al-Darimi
9. Al-Adab al-Mufrad of Muhammad al-Bukhari
10. Musnad of Abu Bakr Ahmad al-Bazzar
11. Musnad Abi Ya'la of Abu Ya'la al-Mawsili
12. Tahdhib al-Athar of al-Tabari
13. Sahih of Ibn Khuzaymah
14. Sahih of Ibn Hibban
15. Al-Mu'jam al-Kabeer of al-Tabarani
16. Sunan of Al-Daraqutni
17. Al-Mustadrak ala al-Sahihayn of Al-Hakim al-Nishapuri
18. Sunan al-Kubra of Al-Bayhaqi
19. Shu'ab al-Iman of Al-Bayhaqi
20. Al-Sunan al-Wusta of Al-Bayhaqi

=== Secondary Hadith collections ===
These were compiled from the primary collections.

1. Masabih al-Sunnah by Al-Baghawi
2. Musnad al-Firdous by Abu Mansur Al-Daylami
3. Jami' al-Usul fi Ahadith al-Rasul by Majd ad-Dīn Ibn Athir
4. At-Targhib wat-Tarhib by Al-Mundhiri
5. Riyadh as-Saaliheen by Al-Nawawi
6. Al-Arba'in al-Nawawiyyah by Al-Nawawi
7. Mishkat al-Masabih by Khatib Al-Tabrizi
8. Talkhis al-Mustadrak by al-Dhahabi
9. Majma al-Zawa'id by Ali ibn Abu Bakr al-Haythami
10. Al-Jaami' al-Kabir by Al-Suyuti
11. Al-Jami' as-Saghir by Al-Suyuti
12. Kanz al-Ummal by Ali ibn Abd-al-Malik al-Hindi

=== Hadith commentaries (Sharh) ===
==== Commentaries on Sahih al-Bukhari ====
1. A'lam al-Sunan by al-Khattabi
2. Sharh Ibn Battal by Ibn Battal
3. Al-Kawakib al-Darari by Shams al-Din al-Kirmani
4. Al-Tawdhih by Ibn al-Mulaqqin
5. Fath al-Bari by Ibn Hajar al-Asqalani
6. Umdat al-Qari by Badr al-Din al-Ayni
7. Irshad al-Sari by al-Qastallani

==== Commentaries on Sahih Muslim ====
1. Ikmāl al-Muʿlim bi-Fawāʾid Muslim by Qadi Iyad
2. Al-Minhaj bi Sharh Sahih Muslim by Al-Nawawi

==== Commentaries on Sunan al-Nasa'i ====
1. Sharh Sunan Al-Nasa'ai by Al-Suyuti

==== Commentaries on Sunan Abi Dawud ====
1. Ma'alim al-Sunan by Al-Khattabi
2. Sharh Sunan Abi Dawud by Ibn Raslan
3. Badhl al-Majhud by Khalil Ahmad Saharanpuri

==== Commentaries on Sunan al-Tirmidhi ====
1. Aridat al-Ahwadhi bi-Sharh Sahih al-Tirmidhi by Abu Bakr ibn al-Arabi

==== Commentaries on Al-Muwatta ====
1. Al-Tamhid by Ibn 'Abd al-Barr
2. Al-Muntaqa Sharh al-Muwatta by Abu al-Walid al-Baji
3. Kitab al-Qabas fi Sharh Muwatta Malik by Abu Bakr ibn al-Arabi
4. Awjaz al-Masalik by Zakariyya Kandhlawi

==== Other Hadith commentaries ====
1. Commentary on Al-Nawawi's Forty Hadith by Ibn Daqiq al-'Id
2. Mirqat al-Mafatih Sharh Mishkat al-masabih by Ali al-Qari
3. Fayd al-Qadir by Al-Munawi
4. Silsalat al-Hadith as-Sahiha by Al-Albani

=== Fabricated Hadith collection ===
1. Al-Mawduʿat al-Kubra by Ibn al-Jawzi

=== Hadith studies ===
1. Introduction to the Science of Hadith (Muqaddimah fi Ulum al-Ḥadith) by Ibn al-Salah
2. Some of the works of al-Madini
3. Tawil Mukhtalif al-Hadith by Ibn Qutaybah
4. Gharib al-Hadith by Al-Khattabi
5. al-Kifaya fi ma'rifat usul 'ilm al-riwaya by Al-Khatib al-Baghdadi
6. al-Ilma ila Maʿrifa Usul al-Riwaya wa Taqyid al-Samaʿ by Qadi Ayyad
7. Al-Muqizah fi 'Ilm Mustalah al-Hadith by Al-Dhahabi
8. Alfiyya of al-Iraqi by Zain al-Din al-'Iraqi
9. Muqaddimah al-Badr al-Munir by Ibn al-Mulaqqin
10. Nukhbat al-Fikar by Ibn Hajar al-Asqalani
11. Al-Maqasid al-Hasanah by Al-Sakhawi
12. Alfiyyah al-Hadit by Al-Suyuti
13. Tadrib al-Rawi by Al-Suyuti

=== Ahadith al-Ahkam ===
1. Sharh Ma'ani al-Athar by Al-Tahawi
2. Sharh Mushkil al-Athar by Al-Tahawi
3. Umdat al-Ahkam by Abd al-Ghani al-Maqdisi
4. Muntaqa al-Akhbar by Majd ad-Din ibn Taymiyya
5. Khilasat al-Ahkam min Muhimmat al-Sunan wa Qawa'id al-Islam by Al-Nawawi
6. Ihkam al-Ahkam by Ibn Daqiq al-'Id
7. Al-I'lam bi Fawa'id Umdat al-Ahkam by Ibn al-Mulaqqin
8. Tarh al‑Tathrib fī Sharh al‑Taqrib by Wali al-Din al-'Iraqi
9. Bulugh al-Maram by Ibn Hajar Asqalani
10. Nayl al-Awtar by Al-Shawkani

== Aqidah (Creed/Theology) ==
1. Al-Fiqh al-Akbar by Abu Hanifa
2. Al-Fiqh al-Absat by Abu Hanifa
3. Al-Wasiyyah by Abu Hanifa
4. Nawadir al-Usul by Al-Hakim al-Tirmidhi
5. Khalq Afal al-Ibad by Muhammad al-Bukhari
6. al-Ikhtilāf fī al-Lafz wa al-Radd ‘alā al-Jahmiyyah wal-Mushabbiha by Ibn Qutaybah
7. Al-Tabsir fi Ma'aalim al-Deen by Al-Tabari
8. Kitab at-Tawheed by Ibn Khuzaymah
9. Al-Aqidah al-Tahawiyyah by Al-Tahawi
10. Maqalat al-Islamiyyin by Abu al-Hasan al-Ash'ari
11. Istihsan al-Khawd fi 'Ilm al-Kalam by Abu al-Hasan al-Ash'ari
12. Al-Luma by Abu al-Hasan al-Ash'ari
13. Al-Ibana by Abu al-Hasan al-Ash'ari
14. Kitab al-Tawhid by Abu Mansur al-Maturidi
15. Al-Sawad al-A'zam by Al-Hakim al-Samarqandi
16. Al-Shari'ah by Abu Bakr al-Ajurri
17. Al-Mutalif wa al-Mukhtalif by Al-Daraqutni
18. Al-Risala al-Qayrawaniyya by Ibn Abi Zayd al-Qayrawani
19. Al-Ibaanah by Ibn Battah
20. Al-Sunnah by Ibn Manda
21. Al-Iman by Ibn Manda
22. Al-Insaf fima Yajib I'tiqaduh by Al-Baqillani
23. Al-Farq bayn al-Firaq by Abu Mansur Al-Baghdadi
24. Hilyat al-Awliya wa Tabaqat al-Asfiya by Abu Nu`aym
25. Al-Arba`in ala Madhhab al-Mutahaqqiqin min al-Sufiyya by Abu Nu`aym
26. Aqidah al-Salafi Ahl al-Hadith by Al-Sabuni
27. Al-Asma' wa al-Sifat by Al-Bayhaqi
28. Al-I'tqaad alaa Madhabis-Salaf Ahlus-Sunnah wal-Jamaah by Al-Bayhaqi
29. Hayat ul Anbiya fi Quboor by Al-Bayhaqi
30. Al-Durrah fi ma Yazibu Itiqaduhu by Ibn Hazm al-Andalusi
31. Al-Ishara ila Madhhab Ahl al-Haqq by Abu Ishaq al-Shirazi
32. Kashf ul Mahjoob by Ali Hujwiri
33. Al-Irshad 'ila Qawati' al-Adilla fi Usul al-I'tiqad by Al-Juwayni
34. Al-Shamil fi Usul al-Din by Al-Juwani
35. Al-Aqida al-Nizamiyya by Al-Juwayni
36. Luma' al-Adilla fi Qawa'id 'Aqā'id Ahl al-Sunna by Al-Juwayni
37. Ihya' Ulum al-Din by Al-Ghazali
38. Al-Iqtisad fi al-I'tiqad by Al-Ghazali
39. Iljam al-Awwam fi Ilm al-Kalam by Al-Ghazali
40. Tabsirat al-Adilla by Abu al-Mu'in al-Nasafi
41. Talkhis al-Adilla li-Qawa'id al-Tawhid by Abu Ishaq al-Saffar al-Bukhari
42. Al-Aqaid al-Nasafiyya by Abu Hafs Umar al-Nasafi
43. Tartib al-Madarik wa takrib al-Masalik by Qadi Ayyad
44. al-I`lam bi Hudud Qawa'id al-Islam by Qadi Ayyad
45. Daqa`iq al-akhbar fi dhikr al-janna wa-l-nar by Qadi Ayyad
46. Al-Milal wa al-Nihal by Al-Shahrastani
47. Nihayat al-Iqdam fi 'Ilm al-Kalam by Al-Shahrastani
48. Al-Ghunya li-Talibi Tariq al-Haqq by Abdul-Qadir Gilani
49. Al-Fath ar-Rabbani by Abdul-Qadir Gilani
50. Tabyin Kadhib al-Muftari by Ibn Asakir
51. Al-Baz al-Ashhab by Ibn al-Jawzi
52. Muhassal by Fakhr al-Din al-Razi
53. Asas al-Taqdis by Fakhr al-Din al-Razi
54. Lumat al-Itiqad by Ibn Qudama
55. Abkar al-Afkar by Sayf al-Din al-Amidi
56. Nihayat al-Mubtadi'in fi Usul al-Deen by Ibn Hamdan
57. Al-Aqidah Al-Waasitiyyah by Ibn Taymiyyah
58. Al-Aqidah al-Hamawiyyah by Ibn Taymiyya
59. Kitab al-Iman by Ibn Taymiyyah
60. Nur al-Mubin by Ibn Juzayy
61. Al-Sayf al-Saqil fi al-Radd ala Ibn Zafil by Taqi al-Din al-Subki
62. Kitab ar-Ruh by Ibn Qayyim al-Jawziyya
63. Al-Mawāqif fī 'ilm al-kalām by Adud al-Din al-Iji
64. Aqaid al-Adudiyya by Adud al-Din al-Iji
65. Sharh al-'Aqa'id al-Nasafiyya by al-Taftazani
66. Sharh Al-Aqīdah At-Tahawiyyah by Ibn Abi al-Izz
67. Al-Farq bayna an-Nasihah wat-Ta'yir by Ibn Rajab
68. Lubab al-Muhassal by Ibn Khaldun
69. Al-'Aqida al-Kubra by Muhammad ibn Yusuf al-Sanusi
70. Al-'Aqida al-Wusta by Muhammad ibn Yusuf al-Sanusi
71. Umm al-Barahin by Muhammad ibn Yusuf al-Sanusi
72. Sharh Fiqh al-Akbar by Ali al-Qari
73. Maktubat Imam Rabbani by Ahmad Sirhindi
74. Jawharat al-Tawhid by Ibrahim al-Laqqani
75. Akhbar al-Akhyar by Abdul-Haqq Dehlavi
76. Takmīl al-Iman by Abdul-Haqq Dehlavi
77. Hujjat Allah al-Baligha by Shah Waliullah Dehlawi
78. Kitab at-Tawhid by Muhammad ibn Abd al-Wahhab
79. Risāla fī ʿilm al-Tawḥīd by al-Bajuri by Ibrahim al-Bajuri
80. Fitnat al-Wahhabiyya by Ahmad Zayni Dahlan
81. Ilm-ul-Kalam by Shibli Nomani
82. Al-Kalam by Shibli Nomani
83. Al-Aqidah at-Tahawiyyah Sharh wa Ta'liq by Al-Albani
84. Al-Muhannad ala al-Mufannad by Muhammad ibn Adam Al-Kawthari
85. Al-Sharh al-Kabir 'ala al-'Aqida al-Tahawiyya by Sa'id Foudah

== Fiqh (Jurisprudence) ==
=== Hanafi ===
1. Ẓāhir al-Riwāyah by Abu Hanifa, Abu Yusuf and Muhammad al-Shaybani
2. Ikhtilaf Abi Hanifa wa Ibn Abi Layla by Abu Yusuf
3. Al-Asl by Muhammad al-Shaybani
4. Mukhtasar al-Tahawi by Al-Tahawi
5. Al-Kafi by Hakim al-Shahid
6. Mukhtasar al-Quduri by Aḥmad Ibn-Muḥammad al-Qudūrī
7. Al-Mabsut by Al-Sarakhsi
8. Al-Hidayah by Burhan al-Din al-Marghinani
9. Fath al-Qadir by Al-Kamal ibn al-Humam
10. Multaqa al-Abḥur by Ibrāhīm al-Ḥalabī
11. Fath Ar-Rahman Fi Isbat-e-Madhhab an-Nu'man by Abdul-Haqq Dehlavi
12. Durr ul-Mukhtar by Muhammad Ala ad-Din Haskafi
13. Radd al-Muhtar ala al-Dur al-Mukhtar by Ibn Abidin
14. Majallah al-Aḥkām al-ʿAdlīyah commissioned by the Ottoman Empire
15. Hukuki İslamiye ve Istılahı Fıkhiyye Kamus by Ömer Nasuhi Bilmen

==== Compilation of Fatwa (Edicts) ====
1. Fatawa Aziz by Shah Abdul Aziz Dehlavi
2. Fatawa-e-Alamgiri commissioned by the Mughal Emperor Aurangzeb
3. Fatawa-i Razawiyya by Ahmed Raza Khan Barelvi

=== Maliki ===
1. Al Mudawanna by Sahnun
2. Al-Risalah by Ibn Abi Zayd Al-Qayrawani
3. Al-Talqin by Qadi Abd al-Wahhab
4. Al-Tabsirah by Abu al-Hassan al-Lakhmi
5. Sharh al-Talqin by Al-Mazari
6. Bidayat al-Mujtahid wa Nihayat al-Muqtasid by Ibn Rushd
7. Jami' al-Ummahat by Ibn al-Hajib
8. Al-Dhakhirah by Shihab al-Din al-Qarafi
9. Al-Furuq by Shihab al-Din al-Qarafi
10. Al-Madkhal by Ibn al-Hajj al-Abdari
11. Al-Qawanin al-Fiqhiyyah by Ibn Juzayy
12. Mukhtasar by Khalil ibn Ishaq al-Jundi
13. Al-Mukhtasar fi al-Fiqh by Ibn 'Arafa
14. Sharh al-Kabir ʿala Khalil by Al-Dardir
15. Al-Sharh al-Saghir ala Aqrab al-Masalik by Al-Dardir
16. Al-Aqrab al-Masslik ila Madhhab al-Imam Malik by Al-Dardir

=== Shafi'i ===
1. Kitab al-Umm by ash-Shafi'i
2. Mukhtaṣar al-Muzanī by Al-Muzani
3. Sharh Mukhtasar al-Muzani by Abu al-Tayyib al-Tabari
4. Al-Hawi al-Kabir fi Fiqh al-Shafi'i by Al-Mawardi
5. Al-Iqna by Al-Mawardi
6. Al-Tanbih by Abu Ishaq al-Shirazi
7. Al-Muhadhdhab fi Fiqh al-Imam al-Shafi'i by Abu Ishaq al-Shirazi
8. Nihayat al-Matlab fi Dirayat al-Madhhab by Al-Juwayni
9. Al-Basit fi Fiqh al-Imam al-Shafi'i by Al-Ghazali
10. Al-Wasit fi Fiqh al-Imam al-Shafi'i by Al-Ghazali
11. Al-Wajiz fi Fiqh al-Imam al-Shafi'i by Al-Ghazali
12. Al-'Aziz Sharh al-Wajiz by Abu al-Qasim al-Rafi'i
13. Al-Muharrar by Abu al-Qasim al-Rafi'i
14. Al-Majmu' Sharh al-Muhadhab by Al-Nawawi
15. Rawdat al-Talibin by Al-Nawawi
16. Minhaj al-Talibin by Al-Nawawi
17. Umdat al-Salik wa Uddat al-Nasik by Ibn al-Naqib
18. Tashih al-Minhaj by Siraj al-Din al-Bulqini
19. Umdat ul-Muhtaj ila Sharh al-Minhaj by Ibn al-Mulaqqin
20. Safwat al-Zubad by Ibn Raslan
21. Kanz al-Raghibin by Al-Mahalli
22. Asna al-Matalib fi Sharh Rawd al-Talib by Zakariyya al-Ansari
23. Tuhfah AL-Muhtaj Bi Sharh Al-Minhaj by Ibn Hajar al-Haytami
24. Nihayat al-Muhtaj ilā Sharh al-Minhaj by Shams al-Din al-Ramli

=== Hanbali ===
1. Masāʾil by Ahmad ibn Hanbal
2. Muthīr al-Gharām al-Sākin ilā Ashraf al-Amākin by Ibn al-Jawzi
3. ʿUmdat al-Fiqh by Ibn Qudamah
4. Al-Mughnī by Ibn Qudamah
5. Al-Kaafi by Ibn Qudamah
6. Kitab al-Furu by Ibn Muflih
7. Zād al-Mustaqniʿ by Al-Hajjawi
8. Muntahā al-Irādāt by al-Bahūtī
9. ʿUmdat al-Ṭālib by al-Bahūtī
10. Kashshāf al-Qināʿ by al-Bahūtī

=== Zahiri ===
1. Al-Muhalla by Ibn Hazm

== Usul al-Fiqh (Legal Theory) ==
=== Hanafi ===
1. Al-Fusul fi al-Usul by Al-Jassas
2. Taqwim al-Adillah by Abu Zayd al-Dabusi
3. Kanz al-Wusul ila Ma'refat al-Usul by Al-Bazdawi
4. Usul al-Sarakhsi by Al-Sarakhsi
5. Usul al-Ifta wa Adabuhu by Taqi Usmani

=== Maliki ===
1. Al-Taqrib wa al-Irshad by Al-Baqillani
2. Mukhtasar Ibn al-Hajib by Ibn al-Hajib
3. Tanqih al-Fusul fi 'Ilm al-Usul by Shihab al-Din al-Qarafi
4. Al-Muwafaqat by Abu Ishaq al-Shatibi
5. Taqrib al-Wusul 'ila Ilm al-Usul by Ibn Juzayy
6. Maqasid al-Shari'ah by Ibn Ashur

=== Shafi'i ===
1. Al-Risala by Al-Shafi'i
2. Al-Luma' fi Usul al-Fiqh by Abu Ishaq al-Shirazi
3. Al-Burhan fi Usul al-Fiqh by Al-Juwayni
4. Al-Talkhis fi Usul al-Fiqh by Al-Juwayni
5. Al-Waraqat fi Usul al-Fiqh by Al-Juwayni
6. Al-Mustasfa by Al-Ghazali
7. Al Muntakhab Mina al-Mahsul fi Usul-al-Fiqh by Fakhr al-Din al-Razi
8. Al-Ihkam fi Usul al-Ahkam by Sayf al-Din al-Amidi
9. Minhaj al-Baydawi by Al-Baydawi
10. Jam' al-Jawami' by Taj al-Din al-Subki
11. Al-Bahr al-Muhit fi Usul al-Fiqh by Al-Zarkashi
12. Sharh al-Mahalli 'Ala Jam' al-Jawami by Al-Mahalli
13. Lubb al-Usul by Zakariyya al-Ansari
14. Ghayat al-Wusul ila Sharh Lubb al-Usul by Zakariyya al-Ansari

=== Hanbali ===
1. Al-ʿUdda fī Usul al-Fiqh by Abu Ya'la ibn al-Farra'
2. Al-Wadih fi Usul al-Fiqh by Ibn Aqil
3. Rawdat al-Nazir by Ibn Qudamah
4. Sharh al-Kawkab al-Munīr by Ibn Najjar al-Hanbali

=== Zahiri ===
1. Al-Ihkam fi Usul al-Ahkam by Ibn Hazm

== Arabic sciences ==
=== Grammar ===
1. Kitab Sibawayh by Sibawayh
2. Al-Jumal by Abu al-Qasim al-Zajjaji
3. Mi'ut Ạmil by Abd al-Qahir al-Jurjani
4. Al-Miftah fi al-Sarf by Abd al-Qahir al-Jurjani
5. Alfiyya of Ibn Malik by Ibn Malik
6. Al-Tashil al-Fawa'id by Ibn Malik
7. Al-Kafiya by Ibn al-Hajib
8. Al-Shafiya by Ibn al-Hajib
9. Al-Tawdih fi Sharh al-Tashil by Abu Hayyan al-Gharnati
10. Al-Tadhkira fi al-Nahw by Abu Hayyan al-Gharnati
11. Mughni al-Labib by Ibn Hisham al-Ansari
12. Awdah al-Masalik by Ibn Hashim al-Ansari
13. Sharh Qatr al-Nada by Ibn Hashim al-Ansari
14. Sharh Ibn Aqil by Abd Allah ibn Abd al-Rahman ibn Aqil
15. Al-Ajurrumiyya by Ibn Adjurrum
16. Poem of Sidi Boushaki by Sidi Boushaki
17. Al-Faridah by Al-Suyuti

=== Dictionary ===
1. Kitab al-'Ayn by Al-Khalil ibn Ahmad al-Farahidi
2. Jamharat al-Lughahby Ibn Duraid
3. Tahdhib al-Lugha by Abu Mansur al-Azhari
4. Mu'jam Maqayis al-Lughah by Ibn Faris
5. Al-Sihah fi al-Lugha by Abu Nasr al-Jawhari
6. Al-Muhkam wa-al-Muhit al-Aʻzam by Ibn Sidah
7. Al-Mufradat fi Gharib al-Quran by Al-Raghib al-Isfahani
8. Al-Nihaya fi al-Gharib al-Hadith by Majd ad-Dīn Ibn Athir
9. Lisan al-Arab by Ibn Manzur
10. Al-Qāmūs al-Muḥīṭ by Firuzabadi
11. Al Ta'rifat by Al-Sharif al-Jurjani
12. Taj al-'Arus min Jawahir al-Qamus by Murtada al-Zabidi

=== Rhetoric ===
1. Dala'il al-I'jaz by Abd al-Qahir al-Jurjani
2. Asrar al-Balagha by Abd al-Qahir al-Jurjani
3. Talkhis al-Miftah by Jalal al-Din al-Qazwini
4. Al-Idah fi Ulum al-Balagha by Jalal al-Din al-Qazwini
5. Al‑Fawa'ed al‑Ghiyathiyya by Adud al-Din al-Iji
6. Al-Mutawwal by Al-Taftazani
7. Mukhtasar al-Ma'ani by Al-Taftazani
8. Hashiyah al-Sharifiyah 'ala al-Sharh al-Mutawwal by Al-Sharif al-Jurjani
9. Uqud al-Juman by Al-Suyuti

== Sirah (Prophetic biography) ==
1. Kitab al-Maghazi by Musa ibn ʿUqba
2. Sirat Rasul Allah by Ibn Ishaq
3. Al-Sirah Al-Nabawiyyah by Ibn Hisham
4. Al-Shama'il al-Muhammadiyya by Al-Tirmidhi
5. Dala'il al-Nubuwwah by Abu Nu'aym al-Isfahani
6. Dala'il al-Nubuwwah by Al-Bayhaqi
7. Ash-Shifa by Qadi Ayyad
8. Al-Rawḍ al-unuf by Al-Suhayli (a commentary of Al-Sirah Al-Nabawiyyah)
9. Al-Wafa bi Ahwal al-Mustafa by Ibn al-Jawzi
10. Zad al-Ma'ad by Ibn Qayyim Al-Jawziyya
11. Al-Sīrah al-Nabawīyyah by Ibn Kathir
12. Al-Khasa'is al-Kubra by Al-Suyuti
13. Al-Muwahib al-Ladunniyyah by Al-Qastallani
14. Al-Naimat-ul-Kubra Ala al-Alam by Ibn Hajar al-Haytami
15. Sharh al-Shifa by Ali al-Qari (a commentary of Ash-Shifa)
16. Madarij an-Nabuwwat by 'Abd al-Haqq al-Dehlawi
17. Seeratul Nabi by Shibli Nomani and Suleiman Nadvi
18. Seeratul Mustafa by Muhammad Idris Kandhlawi
19. Ar-Raheeq Al-Makhtum by Safiur Rahman Mubarakpuri
20. Seerat Khatam al-Anbiya by Muhammad Shafi

== Sirah (Biography of companions (sahaba)) ==
1. Kitāb al-Ṭabaqāt al-Kabīr by Ibn Sa'd (d.845 AD)
2. Kitab Ma'rifat al-Sahaba by Al-Madini (d.849 AD)
3. Kitab al-Fada'il Sahaba by Ahmad ibn Hanbal (d.855 AD)
4. Al-Istiʿāb by Ibn Abd-al-Barr (d.1071 AD)
5. Usd al-ghabah fi marifat al-Saḥabah by Ali ibn al-Athir (d.1233 AD)
6. Hayat al-Sahaba by Yusuf Kandhlawi (d.1959 AD)

== History ==
1. Jamharah Ansāb al-ʿArab by Hisham ibn al-Kalbi (d.819 AD)
2. Book of Idols by Hisham ibn al-Kalbi (d.819 AD)
3. The Great History by Muhammad al-Bukhari (d.870 AD)
4. Fath al-Buldan by Ahmad ibn Yahya al-Baladhuri (d.892 AD)
5. Genealogies of the Nobles by Ahmad Ibn Yahya al-Baladhuri (d.892 AD)
6. Tarikh at-Tabari by al-Tabari (d.923 AD)
7. The Meadows of Gold by Al-Masudi (d.956 AD)
8. Akhbar al-Zaman by Al-Masudi (d.956 AD)
9. Works of Ahmad ibn Fadlan (d.960 AD)
10. History of Nishapur by Al-Hakim al-Nishapuri (d.1014 AD)
11. Hilyat al-Awliya by Abu Nu'aym al-Isfahani (d.1038 AD)
12. Tabaqat al-Hanabilah by Al-Qadi Abu Ya'la (d.1066 AD) and Ibn Rajab al-Hanbali (d.1393 AD)
13. History of Baghdad by Al-Khatib al-Baghdadi (d.1071 AD)
14. History of Damascus by Ibn `Asakir (d.1176 AD)
15. Ṣifat al-Ṣafwwah by Ibn al-Jawzi (d.1201 AD)
16. Al-Kamal fi Asma' al-Rijal by Abd al-Ghani al-Maqdisi (d.1203 AD)
17. Chach Nama by Kazi Ismail al-Thakafi & Ali bin Ḥamid Kufi (written in 1226 AD)
18. Mu'jam Al-Buldan by Yaqut al-Hamawi (d.1229 AD)
19. The Complete History by Ali ibn al-Athir (d.1233 AD)
20. Tabaqat-i Nasiri by Minhaj-i-Siraj (written in 1260 AD)
21. Deaths of Eminent Men and the Sons of the Epoch by Ibn Khallikan (d.1282 AD)
22. Minah al-madh by Fatḥ al-Din Ibn Sayyid al-Nās (d.1334 AD)
23. Mizan al-Itidal by al-Dhahabi (d.1348 AD)
24. Siyar A'lam al-Nubala' by al-Dhahabi (d.1348 AD)
25. Tabaqat al-Shafi'iyya al-Kubra by Taj al-Din al-Subki (d.1370 AD)
26. al-Bidayah wan-Nihayah by Ibn Kathir (d.1373 AD)
27. Qisas Al-Anbiya by Ibn Kathir (d.1373 AD)
28. Muqaddimah by Ibn Khaldun (d.1406 AD)
29. Tahdhib al-Tahdhib by Ibn Hajar al-'Asqalani (d.1449 AD)
30. History of the Caliphs by Al-Suyuti (d.1505 AD)
31. Wafa al-Wafa by Ali ibn Ahmad al-Samhudi (d.1533 AD)
32. Habib al-Siyar by Ghiyās̲ ad-Dīn Khvāndamīr (d. 1537 AD)
33. Tarikh Khamis by Husayn ibn Muhammad Diyarbakri (d.1559 AD)
34. Tarikh-i Firishta by Muhammad Qasim Firishta (d.1620 AD)
35. Sirat al-Halbiya by Ali Ibn Burhan-ud-din Halbi (d.1635 AD)
36. Tariqh-e Haqqi by Abdul-Haqq Dehlavi (d.1642 AD)
37. Al Insaf fi Bayan Asbab Al Iktikaaf by Shah Waliullah Dehlawi (d.1762 AD)
38. Sirush Shahadhathayn by Shah Abdul Aziz Dehlavi (d.1824 AD)

== Tazkiyyah (Purification of Heart) ==
=== Basics ===
1. Risalah al-Mustarshidin (Treatise for the Seekers of Guidance) by Harith al-Muhasibi (d. 243 AH)

=== Spiritual Diseases and their Cures ===
1. Ṭibb al-Rūḥāni by Ibn al-Jawzi (d. 597 AH)
2. Tanbih al-Mughtarin by Al-Sha'rani (d. 973 AH)

=== Dhikr ===
1. Al-Da'awat al-Kabir by Al-Bayhaqi
2. Hizb al-Bahr by Abul Hasan ash-Shadhili
3. Kitab al-Adhkar by Al-Nawawi
4. Al-Wabil al-Sayyib by Ibn Qayyim Al-Jawziyya
5. Dala'il al-Khayrat by Muhammad al-Jazuli
6. Al-Hizb ul-Azam by Ali al-Qari
7. Fortress of the Muslim by Sa'id bin Ali bin Wahf Al-Qahtani

=== Adab (Manners) ===
1. Al-Adab al-Mufrad of Muhammad al-Bukhari (d. 256 AH)
2. Al-Akhlāq wa al-Siyar by Ibn Hazm (d. 456 AH)
3. Fuṣul al-Adab wa Makarim al-Akhlaq al-Mashruʿah by Ibn Aqil (d. 513 AH)

=== Zuhd (Asceticism) ===
1. Kitab al-Zuhd wa al-Raqaiq by Ibn al-Mubarak (d. 189 AH)
2. Kitab al-Zuhd by Ahmad ibn Hanbal
3. Al-Zuhd al-Kabir by Al-Bayhaqi

=== Sufism ===
1. Qut al-qulub (Sustenance of the Hearts) by Abu Talib al-Makki (d. 386 AH)
2. Al-Arba`in ala Madhhab al-Mutahaqqiqin min al-Sufiyya by Abu Nu`aym (d. 430 AH)
3. Al-Risala al-Qushayriyya by Abu al-Qasim al-Qushayri (d. 465 AH)
4. Kashf ul Mahjoob by Ali Hujwiri (d. 465 AH)
5. Tazkirat al-Awliya by Attar of Nishapur (d. 617 AH)
6. Maktubat Imam Rabbani by Ahmad Sirhindi (d. 1034 AH)

== Islamic Ethics and Philosophy ==
1. Hayat ul Anbiya fi Quboor by Al-Bayhaqi (d. 458 AH)
2. Ihya Ulum al-Din by Al-Ghazali (d. 505 AH)
3. Kimiya-yi sa'ādat by Al-Ghazali (d. 505 AH)
4. Al-Fath ar-Rabbani by Shaykh Abdul-Qadir Gilani (d. 561 AH)
5. Al-Futūḥāt al-Makkiyya by Ibn Arabi (d. 638 AH)
6. al-Mufassal fi 'Ahkam al-Mar'ah wa Bayt al-Muslim fi al-Shari'at al-Islamiyyah by Abdul Karim Zaidan (d. 2014 CE)

== Critique ==
=== Ahmadiyya ===
1. Saife Chishtiyai by Meher Ali Shah
2. Signs of Qiyamah and the Arrival of Maseeh by Muhammad Shafi
3. Finality of the Prophethood by Muhammad Shafi

=== Shi'a ===
1. Al-Awasim min al-Qawasim by Abu Bakr ibn al-Arabi
2. Al-Sawa'iq al-Muhriqah by Ibn Hajar al-Haytami
3. Taufa Ithna Ashari by Shah Abdul Aziz Dehlavi

== See also ==
- List of Islamic texts
- List of Muslim educational institutions
- List of Shia books
- List of hadith books
