= Al-Risala al-Qushayriyya =

1045–6 treatise on Sufism by al-Qushayri

- Al-Qusharyri's Epistle on Sufism
- Editors: Dr. Muhammad Eissa, Laleh Bakhtiar, 'Abd al-Halim Mahmud
- Author: Abu al-Qasim al-Qushayri
- Original title: الرسالة القشيرية في علم التصوف
- Translator: Professor Alexander D. Knysh
- Language: Arabic, English, French, German, Persian, Turkish, and Urdu
- Subject: Sufism, Tabaqat, Kalam (Islamic theology)
- Publisher: Suhail Academy Lahore, Mizan Press, Kazi Publications
- Publication date: 2011
- Publication place: Persia (present-day Iran)
- Pages: 480 pages
- ISBN: 978-9695191828
- Followed by: Lata'if al-Isharat (Subtleties of the Allusions)

Al-Risala al-Qushayriyya fi 'Ilm al-Tasawwuf (Arabic: الرسالة القشيرية في علم التصوف, 'Al-Qushayri's Epistle on Sufism'), commonly known as al-Risala al-Qushayriyya, is an eleventh-century (written in 1046) Arabic manual of Sufism written by the Shafi'i–Ash'ari scholar and Sufi master Abu al-Qasim al-Qushayri (d. 465 AH / 1072 CE). The work was written during a period of Ash'ari–Mu'tazili sectarian conflict in Nishapur under early Seljuk rule, and attempts to vindicate Sufism as a legitimate 'Islamic science,' fully compatible with Sunni Islam. The epistle is unique among texts of its period for combining Islamic hagiography and the 'Sufi handbook' genre into a single condensed work. It has become the most widely disseminated handbook of Sufism in the Islamic world, has been translated into English, French, German, Farsi, Turkish, and Urdu, and remains a foundational work in the study of Islamic mysticism.

== Background ==
Al-Qushayri was born in 376 AH / 986 CE in Khurasan (present-day northeastern Iran) and spent most of his career in Nishapur, then a prominent center of Islamic learning. His thought was influenced by Shafi'i jurisprudence, Ash'arite theology, and Sufism alike. The epistle was written during a period of persecution in Nishapur, when Seljuk vizier Al-Kunduri publicly denounced and jailed Ash'ari scholars, including al-Qushayri.

The epistle is written with three specific aims: first, to demonstrate that the beliefs of early Sufi masters were identical to those of mainstream Sunni Islam in the Ash'arite school. Secondly, arguing in favor of Sufism as a formal Islamic discipline, an ilm (knowledge, or science), with its own technical vocabulary and legacy of authoritative ancestors. Finally, to differentiate the actual Sufi tradition from what al-Qushayri saw as the improper conduct of Sufi 'imitators' who had given the ulama (state legal scholars) cause to condemn Sufism entirely.

== Content ==
=== Preface ===
Al-Qushayri dedicates the work to Ash'arite belief covering divine oneness (tawhid), the divine attributes, the nature of the Quran, prophethood, and eschatology. The emphasis on fundamental tenets of Sunni belief is intended to situate the later discussion of Sufism firmly within the Sunni canon. Unique Sufi views such as fana, or the annihilation of the self in God, had historically drawn accusations of pantheism and antinomianism from Islamic scholars, especially in the wake of the famous execution of Sufi mystic al-Hallaj for the same charge. The medieval scholar Taj al-Din al-Subki ranked al-Qushayri's creedal statement among the most important classical Sunni declarations, alongside al-Tahawi's 'Aqida al-Tahawiyya.

=== Part 1 ===
The first part contains biographical accounts of 83 early Sufi saints, listed in chronological order from Ibrahim ibn Adham (d. 162 AH / 778 CE) to Ahmad ibn 'Ata' al-Rudhbari (d. 369 AH / 980 CE). The hagiography draws on al-Sulami's work emphasizing the figures' religious experience, but al-Qushayri presents the same figures as guardians of sharia, arguing for a lineage of Sufi legitimacy in the realm of Islamic religious authority. Earlier Sufi scholars had not integrated biography and doctrine in their manuals, and this use of evidence is regarded in scholarship as the key reason for the al-Qurayshi's positive reception when compared to other contemporary Sufi authors such as al-Kalabadhi and al-Sarraj.

=== Part 2 ===
The second section provides definitions and analyses of 27 technical terms in use among the Sufis, including mystical emphasis on the present (waqt), station, (maqam), opening of the heart (bast), annihilation of the ego in God (fana'), meditation and focus on God (dhikr), and divine trust (tawakkul). The definitions include etymology of the words, sayings from earlier Sufi masters, and tracing of the words back to Qur'an and prophetic tradition.

=== Part 3 ===
The third part describes 44 particular spiritual stations (maqamat) and conditions (ahwal) of the Sufist path, from foundational virtues of repentance (tawba), renunciation (zuhd), patience (sabr), and gratitude (shukr), to more esoteric virtues such as receiving divine knowledge (ma'rifa). The section also contains chapters on the usefulness of listening to music in prayer (sama') and the miracles performed by saints (karamat). Al-Qushayri's discussion on spiritual conditions and stations granted by God became a standard reference point in the Sufi literary tradition. By justifying his taxonomy with Quranic verses and the sayings of Muslim predecessors, al-Qushayri presents mystical states such as annihilation (fana') and religious ecstasy (wajd) as documented Islamic experiences rather than heresies.

== Reception ==
=== Medieval reception ===
The epistle was quickly popularized as a reference for Sufi doctrine and practice. Al-Qushayri discipled Abu Ali al-Farmadi (d. 477 AH / 1084 CE), who in turn taught Abu Hamid al-Ghazali (d. 505 AH / 1111 CE). Al-Ghazali's work Revival of the Religious Sciences (Ihya' Ulum al-Din) built on al-Qushayri's work of integrating mystical and legal Islam, and endures as one of the most influential texts in Islamic history.

Numerous major commentaries were produced in subsequent centuries. Taj al-Din al-Subki placed the epistle's creedal preface alongside Ibn Tumart's work, the founder of the Almohad Empire in North Africa and al-Andalus. A manuscript copy produced in Fez in 617 AH / 1220 CE was likely transcribed to the founding ruler of the Hafsid dynasty, attesting to the epistle's spread to North Africa within two centuries of its authorship.

=== Modern reception ===
Alexander Knysh, its most recent English translator, describes the epistle as "probably the most popular Sufi manual ever," arguing that the Risala captures the moment when Sufism seriously shifted from an informal spiritual practice into a recognized Islamic discipline with its own vocabulary, doctrine, and canon of predecessors. Annemarie Schimmel described it as "probably the most widely read summary of early Sufism," adding that it "was analyzed in the West prior to most other books on Sufism." The Encyclopaedia of Islam called it "a most important compendium of the principles and terminology of Sufism." The epistle has seen continued use into the modern day as teaching material in Islamic institutions across the Arab world, South Asia, and Southeast Asia.

== Commentaries ==
- Shaykh al-Islam Zakariyya al-Ansari (d. 926/1520) authored a commentary on al-Qushayri's treatise, entitled Ahkam al-Dalala 'ala Tahrir al-Risala.
- The Hanafi scholar Mulla 'Ali al-Qari (d. 1014/1606) wrote a commentary on al-Qushayri's treatise in two volumes, according to 'Umar Rida Kahhala in his Mu'jam al-Muallifin.

== Translations ==
=== English editions ===
- Principles of Sufism, translated by Barbara R. von Schlegell, introduction by Hamid Algar (Berkeley: Mizan Press, 1990). Partial translation of part 3.
- The Risalah: Principles of Sufism, translated by Rabia Harris, edited by Laleh Bakhtiar (Chicago: Kazi Publications, 1997; revised edition 2002).
- Al-Qushayri's Epistle on Sufism, translated by Alexander D. Knysh, reviewed by Muhammad Eissa (Reading: Garnet Publishing, 2007). The first complete, annotated English translation.

=== Other languages ===
- Persian: Tarjuma-yi Risāla-yi Qushayriyya, translated by Abu Ali al-Usmani (contemporary student of al-Qushayri), edited by Badi' al-Zaman Furuzanfar. The oldest surviving translation.
- Turkish: Kuşeyrî Risâlesi: Tasavvuf İlmine Dair, translated by Süleyman Uludağ (Istanbul: Dergâh Yayınları, 1978; 13th edition 2025).
- German: Das Sendschreiben al-Qusayris über das Sufitum, translated with introduction and commentary by Richard Gramlich (Stuttgart: Franz Steiner Verlag, 1989).
- French: Épître sur la science du soufisme (Tome I: Introduction, les principes, les maîtres), translated by André Fontenay (Paris: Albouraq, 2016).
- Urdu: Ruh-e-Tasawwuf, translated by Maulana Mohammad Irfan Beg Noori (Aligarh: Darul Irfan, 2000).

== See also ==
- Kashf al-Mahjub
- The Beginning of Guidance
- The Revival of the Religious Sciences
- The Moderation in Belief
- List of Sunni books
