= Abu Mansur al-Baghdadi =

Arab Shafi'i scholar, Heresiologist and mathematician

Abū Manṣūr al-Baghdādī (أَبُو مَنْصُور الْبَغْدَادِي)
- Title: Imam

Personal life
- Born: c. 980 Baghdad
- Died: 1037 (429 AH) (aged c. 56–57) Isfayayin
- Era: Islamic golden age
- Region: Khorasan
- Main interest(s): Theology (Kalam), Islamic Jurisprudence, Principles of Islamic jurisprudence, Arabic grammar, Mathematics
- Notable work(s): Al-Farq bayn al-Firaq; Kitab Uṣul al-Din
- Occupation: Theologian, Scholar, Jurist, Legal theoretician, Grammarian, Heresiologist, Mathematician

Religious life
- Religion: Islam
- Denomination: Sunni
- Jurisprudence: Shafi'i
- Creed: Ash'ari

Muslim leader
- Influenced by: Al-Shafi'i Abu Hasan al-Ash'ari Abu Ishaq al-Isfarayini
- Influenced: Al-Qushayri Al-Bayhaqi

Abū Manṣūr ʿAbd al-Qāhir ibn Ṭāhir bin Muḥammad bin ʿAbd Allāh al-Tamīmī al-Shāfiʿī al-Baghdādī (Arabic: أبو منصور عبد القاهر ابن طاهر بن محمد بن عبد الله التميمي الشافعي البغدادي), more commonly known as Abd al-Qāhir al-Baghdādī (عبد القاهر البغدادي) or simply Abū Manṣūr al-Baghdādī (أبو منصور البغدادي) was an Arab Sunni scholar from Baghdad. He was considered a leading Ash'arite theologian and Shafi'i jurist. He was an accomplished legal theoretician, man of letters, poet, prosodist, grammarian, heresiologist and mathematician.

== Life ==
'Abd al-Qahir al-Baghdadi was born and raised in Baghdad. He was a member of the Arab tribe of Banu Tamim. Ibn 'Asakir writes that Abu Mansur met the students of the companions of Imam al-Ashari and acquired knowledge from them. Among the Ashari imams of the third generation, he is the senior of al-Bayhaqi and the identical contemporary of Abu Dharr al-Harawi and Abu Muhammad al-Juwayni. Abu Mansur was brought in his youth by his father from Baghdad to Nishapur. In his new city is where he found his education. Abu Mansur was known as a wealthy man where he donated his whole fortune to the scholars of wisdom until he was qualified to instruct in seventeen various subjects, including fiqh, usul, arithmetic, law of inheritance and theology. Most of the scholars of Khurasan were his pupils. He was a senior pupil of Abu Ishaq al-Isfarayini, and he and Abu Sahl al-Su'luki steadfastly upheld the al-Shafi`i view that "the Book cannot be abrogated by the Sunna." In the mosque of `Aqil, Abu Mansur took over as headmaster from Abu Ishaq al-Isfarayini, and it was under his tutelage that al-Bayhaqi, al-Qushayri, Abu Khalaf al-Tabari, and Nasir al-Marwazi learned. He studied Hadith under Abu Bakr al-Isma'ili and others. Due to Turkmen riots near the end of his life, Abu Mansur was forced to flee from Nishapur and established himself as a venerable citizen of Isfarayin, where he died in 429/1038. He was buried right next to his teacher Abu Ishaq al-Isfarayini.

== Reception ==
Abu Uthman al-Sabuni highly praised him and said: “one of the imams of the principles of the Religion and foremost authorities of Islam by consensus of its most eminent and competent scholars.”

== Works ==
'Abd al-Qahir al-Baghdadi was a prolific writer who wrote on numerous subjects and authored several quality books including Kitāb Uṣūl al-Dīn, a systematic treatise, beginning with the nature of knowledge, creation, how the Creator is known, His attributes, etc.... and Al-Farq bayn al-Firaq which takes each sect separately, judges all from the standpoint of orthodoxy and condemns all which deviate from the straight path. Both books were major works on the beliefs of Ahl al-Sunna. His other following known works include:

- al-Takmila fi'l-Hisab, a treatise that contain results in number theory, and comments on works by al-Khwarizmi which are now lost.
- Ahkam al-Wat' al-Tamm, also known as Iltiqa' al-Khitanayn, a book on sexual ethics and pertaining laws in Islam, in four volumes.
- Bulugh al-Mada min Usul al-Huda
- Fada'ih al-Karramiyya
- Fada'ih al-Mu`tazila
- al-Fakhir fi al-Awa'il wa al-Awakhir
- Ibtal al-Qawl bi al-Tawallud
- al-`Imad fi Mawarith al-`Ibad, on inheritance laws.
- al-Iman wa Usuluh
- al-Kalam wa al-Wa`id
- Manaqib al-Imam al-Shafi`i
- Mashariq al-Nur wa Madarik al-Surur fi al-Kalam
- al-Milal wa al-Nihal, a heresiological reference-work.
- Mi`yar al-Nazar
- Nafy Khalq al-Qur'an
- Naqd Abi `Abd Allah al-Jurjani fi Tarjih Madhhab Abi Hanifa, in which he states that Imam al-Shafi`i authored a book in refutation of Brahmans in which he adduces the proofs of Prophethood.
- Nasikh al-Qur'an wa Mansukhuh
- al-Qadaya fi al-Dawr wa al-Wasaya
- Sharh Hadith Iftiraq Ummati `ala Ihda wa Sab`in Firqa
- Sharh Miftah Ibn al-Qass, a book on Shafi`i law.
- Al-Asma wa al-Sifat
- Tafdil al-Faqir al-Sabir `ala al-Ghani al-Shakir
- Tafsir al-Qur'an
- al-Tahsil fi al-Usul
- al-Takmila fi al-Hisab
- Ta'wil Mutashabih al-Akhbar

== See also ==
- List of Ash'aris
- List of Arab scientists and scholars

== Sources ==
- Gibril Fouad Haddad (2 May 2015). "Abd al-Qahir al-Baghdadi (d. 429)". The Biographies of the Elite Lives of the Scholars, Imams & Hadith Masters. As-Sunnah Foundation of America. pp. 185–186.
- Böwering, Gerhard; Orfali, Bilal (January 8, 2015). Salwat al-ʻārifīn wa-uns al-mushtāqīn - The Comfort of the mystics: a manual and anthology of early Sufism. Brill. pp. 3–4. ISBN 9789004233621.
