= Saqr Al-Shubayb =

- صقر الشبيب
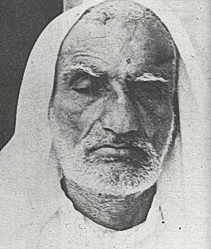
- Born: 1 January 1894; Kuwait City, Sheikhdom of Kuwait
- Died: 6 August 1963 (aged 69); Kuwait City, Kuwait
- Occupation: Poet
- Known for: Leading figure in Kuwaiti poetry, advocate for reform and enlightenment
- Notable work: Diwan Saqr Al-Shubayb

Saqr bin Salem Al-Shubayb (c. 1894 – August 6, 1963) was a Kuwaiti poet, dubbed the “Poet of Kuwait” by historian Abdulaziz Al-Rasheed. In his writings, Al-Shubayb advocated for freedom and the rejection of fanaticism, which provoked conservative figures.

His poetry collection, Diwan Saqr Al-Shubayb, was compiled posthumously by Ahmad Al-Bishr Al-Roumi. Most of his poetry is in classical Arabic.

== Early life and education ==
Saqr bin Salem Al-Shubayb Al-Shammari was born in 1894 in the eastern district of Kuwait City. His family was poor, and both of his parents died when he was young. At the age of seven, he became blind due to an illness in his eyes. Orphaned, impoverished, and visually impaired, he turned to a kuttab (Qur’anic school) where he memorized the Qur’an. A wealthy benefactor, impressed by his intelligence, sponsored his education in Al-Ahsa. There, he memorized classical Arabic literature that was read to him and developed a deep admiration for Al-Ma’arri, memorizing most of his works, especially Al-Luzūmiyyāt.

== Adult life ==
He returned from Al-Ahsa at the age of 24, in the midst of World War I. In Kuwait, he frequented mosques where he would listen to and recite modern Arabic literature. He was particularly influenced by Ahmed Shawqi, Al-Manfaluti, Hafiz Ibrahim, and Al-Aqqad.

Al-Shubayb worked in Kuwait's Department of Education for a year, where he worked on grammar rules for students.

Al-Shubayb died on August 6, 1963.

=== Writing ===
Alongside figures such as Yousef bin Issa Al-Qanaei, Ahmad Al-Bishr Al-Roumi, Abdulmalik Al-Saleh Al-Mubayyed, and Abdulaziz Al-Rasheed, he advocated for a proper and enlightened understanding of Islam.

Some of Al-Shubayb's poetry addressed Palestine and Palestinians.

Eventually, he withdrew from public life due to society’s rejection of his progressive ideas, and remained at home for the last 23 years of his life. He was accused of blasphemy and atheism for his criticism of religious scholars. He was among three poets—alongside Fahd Al-Askar and Abdulmohsen Al-Rasheed—who faced such accusations. He addressed this in one of his poems:

"So what do they want from the lies they spread about my disbelief or my confusion?
O people, what is this arrogance and harshness,
Your religion is my religion, and your race is my race!"

Following Al-Shubayb's death, Ahmad Al-Bishr Al-Roumi compiled his poetry in a collection, writing a preface that included a biographical account of the poet. Abdullah Zakaria Al-Ansari later studied his poetry and concluded that Al-Shubayb viewed knowledge as the ultimate cure for the ailments of Kuwaiti society.

=== Connections ===
He had close relationships with notable figures such as Abdulaziz Al-Rasheed, Sheikh Abdullah Al-Salem Al-Sabah, and Ahmad Al-Bishr Al-Roumi.

His house was adjacent to that of Ahmad Al-Bishr Al-Roumi, who used to read to him various literary works, including Nazarat and Ibarat by Al-Muniflouṭi, as well as works by Al-Rafi'i, and poetry collections by Al-Mutanabbi and Al-Ma'arri. On his deathbed, al-Shubayb asked about Al-Roumi, who was traveling in Yemen at the time.

== Legacy ==
In honor of his literary legacy, the State of Kuwait named an elementary school for boys after him in the Al-Qadisiya district.

On February 18, 2009, the Kuwaiti Writers Association announced a preliminary agreement with the Ministry of Communications to issue commemorative postage stamps honoring pioneers of Kuwaiti cultural life, and Saqr Al-Shubayb was among the names proposed.

== Publications ==
- Diwan Saqr al-Shabib (in Arabic). مكتبة الأمل،. 1968.
