= The Condensed in Imam Shafi'i's Jurisprudence =

Al-Wajiz fi Fiqh al-Imam al-Shafi'i
- Author: Al-Ghazālī
- Language: Arabic
- Subject: Shafi'i school and Islamic jurisprudence
- Publication date: 12th century
- Publication place: Persia

Al-Wajiz fi Fiqh al-Imam al-Shafi'i (Arabic: الوجيز في فقه الإمام الشافعي) or The Condensed in Imam Shafi’i’s Jurisprudence is a concise summary of Shafi’i Fiqh and 'Ilm al-Khilaf (the science of juridical disagreement) written by Imam al-Ghazali the leading juristconsult of his time. It mentions the contrary opinions of Al-Shafi'i including Abu Hanifa, Malik Ibn Anas and Al-Muzani. This book is considered one of the five major works in Shafi'i school of jurisprudence.

== Development ==
The book “al-Wajeez” is a selection of series of Al-Ghazāli books on Shafi’i jurisprudence, entitled al-Baseet, al-Waseet and al-Wajeez. The premise of all these books is based on Nihayat al-Matlab fi Dirayat al-Madhhab authored by Imam al-Haramayn al-Juwayni, master of al-Ghazāli. This was elucidated by Ibn Hajar al-Haytami when he said:

"Al-Ghazāli has abridged the book “Nihāyat” (i.e. Al-Juwayni’s book) in a lengthy and rich summary and named it “al-Baseet”; then he abridged further and named it “al-Waseet” which in its turn was subject to additional abridgment and named it “al-Wajeez.” Then came Imam Abu al-Qasim al-Rafi'i, who concluded a brief explanation of “Al-Wajeez”, then a detailed one, which turned out to be an unmatched compilation in the Shāfi’i School of Thought.”

== Commentary ==
This book was then summarized and expanded upon Imam by Abu al-Qasim al-Rafi'i (d. 623/1226) entitled Al-'Aziz Sharh al-Wajiz, known also as al-Sharh al-Kabir (The Great Commentary) which in turn was summarized by al-Nawawi in his book entitled Rawdat al-Talibin. This work alone has had at least 100 commentaries by many jurists.

== See also ==
- On Legal Theory of Muslim Jurisprudence
