= On Legal Theory of Muslim Jurisprudence =

12th-century treatise by Al-Ghazālī

Al-Mustasfa min 'ilm al-usul
- Author: Al-Ghazālī
- Language: Arabic
- Subject: Principles of Islamic jurisprudence and Islamic Law
- Publication date: 12th century
- Publication place: Persia

Al-mustasfa min 'ilm al-usul (Arabic: المستصفى من علم الأصول) or On Legal theory of Muslim Jurisprudence is a 12th-century treatise written by Abū Ḥāmid Muḥammad ibn Muḥammad al-Ghazali (Q.S) the leading legal theorist of his time. It is a highly celebrated work of Ghazali on Usul Al-Fiqh and is ranked as one of the four great works in this subject. The other three including Al-Qadi Abd al-Jabbar who authored al-Qadi's al-`Umad, Abu al-Husayn al-Basri who authored al-Basri's al-Mu`tamad (commentary on al-`Umad) and Al-Juwayni who authored Al-Burhan.

== Content ==
While Ghazali was deeply involved in tasawwuf and kalam. Most of Ghazali's activity was in the field of Islamic law and jurisprudence. He completed this book towards the end of his life.

Ghazali's method to Usul al-fiqh, as proven in his final and greatest work on Law, al-Mustafa, is based on the assertion that, in essence, this science depends on the expertise of how to extract ahkam (rules) from the Sharia sources. ('As for the science of fiqh, it concerns itself particularly with the Shari'ah rules themselves which have been established in order to qualify the acts of the locus of obligation, man.') Accordingly, Ghazali views it as crucial that any discussion on Usul should focus on three essential elements: the ahkam; the Adilla (sources); and the means by which rules are extracted from these sources, which mainly includes the evaluation of the quality and merit of the extractor, specifically, the mujtahid.

== Structure ==
=== The Sharia rules ===
The Sharia rules were further categorized into following:

- The Essence of the Rules
- The Categories of the Rules
- The Constituents of the Rules

=== The Sources of the rules ===
The Sources of the rules included:

- The First Principal Sources (Quran and The Book of Abrogation)
- The Second Principal Sources (Sunnah)
- The Third Principal Sources (Ijma)
- The Fourth Principal Sources (Rational Proof and Istishab)

== Influence ==
Ibn Qudamah who authored the greatest Usul Al-Fiqh book in the Hanbali madhab entitled Rawdat al-Nazir was significantly influenced by Ghazali's work, Al-mustasfa.

== See also ==
- The Condensed in Imam Shafi’i’s Jurisprudence
