= A Guide to Conclusive Proofs =

Book by Al-Juwayni

Al-Irshad ila Qawati' al-Adilla fi Usul al-I'tiqad
- Author: Al-Juwayni
- Language: Arabic
- Genre: Aqidah, Kalam (Islamic theology)
- Published: English translation published in 2000 (Ithaca Press, Garnet Publishing Ltd.)
- Publication place: Persia
- Media type: Print (paperback)
- Pages: 372
- ISBN: 978-1-85964-157-6

A Guide to Conclusive Proofs for the Principles of Belief (Arabic: الإرشاد إلى قواطع الأدلة في أصول الاعتقاد, romanized: Al-Irshad ila Qawati' al-Adilla fi Usul al-I'tiqad), commonly known simply as Al-Irshad ("The Guide"), is a major classic of Islamic theology. Its author, Imam al-Haramayn al-Juwayni, was the leading theologian of his time. His writings in the field of theology, especially Al-Irshad, represent a high point of the development of theology in the then contemporary Islamic world.

== Content ==
It is intended to outline exactly what has been proven, what can be proven and how those things can be proven. He focuses much of his attention on God and the fundamental Islamic principle that God is the only and all-powerful creator. He explains that we are often caught up in a temporally contingent existence, lost in continuity but that we should realize God's ability to interrupt this continuity at any time. Al-Juwayni focuses a similar amount of attention on legal methodology and is particularly concerned with the methods for discerning difficult debates. He explains naskh "abrogation", for example, in great detail.

== See also ==
- The Moderation in Belief
- List of Sunni books
