= Tarikh Khamis =

Book by Husayn ibn Muhammad Diyarbakri

- Author: Husayn ibn Muhammad Diyarbakri
- Original title: تاريخ خميس
- Language: Arabic
- Subject: History of Islam
- Genre: Islamic literature, History
- Publisher: Cairo (1884); Beirut (reprint, 1390 AH)
- Publication date: 1884 CE (1302 AH)
- Publication place: Egypt
- Media type: Print

Tarikh al-Khamis fi ahwal anfas nafis or Tarikh Khamis or Tarikh al-Khamis is a history collection about the history of Islam authored by Sunni Islamic Scholar Husayn ibn Muhammad Diyarbakri, (who died in either 1559 CE (966 AH) or 1574 CE (982 AH)), and published in Cairo in 1884 CE (1302 AH) and reprinted in Beirut in 1390 AH Diyarbakri is among the most popular compilers of later times. It is also transliterated as Tareekh Khamees and Tareekh-e-Khamees.

== See also ==
- List of Sunni books
