= Abu Muhammad al-Juwayni =

10th-century Islamic scholar

Imam Abu Muhammad al-Juwayni
- أبو محمد الجويني
- Title: Rukn al-Din

Personal life
- Born: Juwayn
- Died: 1047 CE (438 AH) Nishapur
- Era: Islamic golden age
- Region: Khorasan
- Main interest(s): Islamic theology (kalam), Fiqh, Usul al-Fiqh, Hadith, Tafsir, Arabic grammar

Religious life
- Religion: Islam
- Denomination: Sunni
- Jurisprudence: Shafi'i
- Creed: Ash'ari

Muslim leader
- Influenced by: Al-Shafi'i Abu Hasan al-Ash'ari Abu Nu'aym al-Isfahani
- Influenced: Al-Juwayni Al-Bayhaqi Abu Uthman al-Sabuni

Al-Juwayni, `Abd Allah ibn Yusuf ibn `Abd Allah ibn Yusuf ibn Muhammad ibn Hayyuya, Rukn al-Din Abu Muhammad al-Ta'i al-Sinbisi al-Naysaburi al-Shafi`i al-Ash`ari, also known as Abu Muhammad al-Juwayni (Arabic: أبو محمد الجويني), was a Sunni scholar based in Khorasan. He was a leading jurist (faqih), legal theoretician (usuli), Arabic grammarian, (nahwi), Qu'ran exegete (mufassir) and a scholar of theology, man of letters, and Hadith. He was the father of the great Imam al-Haramayn.

== Early life ==
He was born in the town of Juwayn in modern-day northeastern Iran, where he spent his early years, and from which he derived the nisbah "al-Juwayni". Abu Muhammad al-Juwayni was raised in Juwayn, where he began his education under the guidance of his father. He initially studied literature with his father, Abu Ya'qub Yusuf al-Juwayni, before learning jurisprudence (fiqh) from Abu Ya'qub al-Abyurdi. He later left Juwayn for Nishapur, where he became a student of Abu al-Tayyib al-Su'luki. Eager to further his studies, he then travelled to Merv to study under al-Qaffal al-Marwazi, from whom he gained extensive knowledge of both fiqh and theology (kalam). He also studied Hadith from Abu Nu'aym al-Isfahani, Ibn Mahmish, Abu al-Husayn ibn Bishran, and others.

== Scholarly life ==
=== Career ===
He settled in Nishapur after his intense educational journeys and began to issue fatwas, teach, and debate in the year 407 of Hijri. He became popular for his assiduous worship and the great dignity, majesty, and earnestness of his scholarly gatherings.

=== Students ===
His famous students who became giants of their time include:

- Al-Juwayni
- Al-Bayhaqi
- Abu Uthman al-Sabuni
- Ali ibn Ahmed ibn Al-Akhram
- Sahel bin Ibrahim Al-Masjidi

Abu Muhammad al-Juwayni related that he once saw Prophet Yusuf in his dream whereupon he fell to his knees in order to kiss his feet, but Yusuf prevented him as a mark of honour for the Imam, so the latter kissed Yusuf's heels. Abu Muhammad al-Juwayni said: "I interpreted it to mean that there would be blessing and honour in what I would leave behind." Ibn al-Subki commented: "What greater blessing and honour than his son (Al-Juwayni)!"

== Death ==
He died in Nishapur on the Dhu'l-Qa'da 438 (May 1047). Abu Salih al-Mu'adhdhin said: "I gave Abu Muhammad his funeral bath. When we were wrapping him in the shroud I saw his right arm to the arm-pit luminous like the moon. I was bewildered, then I said to myself: these are the blessings of his legal responses."

== Reception ==
Abu Uthman al-Sabuni said: "If Shaykh Abu Muhammad had been born among the Israelites, they would have transmitted his immense merits to us and he would have made their pride."

Ibn Asakir narrates from his maternal uncle, `Abd al-Wahid ibn `Abd al-Karim al-Qushayri the son of Imam Abu al-Qasim: "In his time our [Ash`ari and Shafi`i] imams and the verifying scholars among our companions saw in him such perfection and high merit that they used to say: If it were permissible to hold that Allah sent another prophet in our time, it would not have been other than he."

== Works ==
- Al-Furuq
- Al-Jam` wa al-Farq
- Mawqif al-Imam wa al-Ma'mum
- Al-Muhit, in which the imam intended to compile a fiqh manual in disregard of the Shafi`i school and based only on hadith proof-texts. Al-Bayhaqi criticized the weakness of the hadiths he saw him adduce and pointed out to him that Al-Shafi`i was meticulous enough in inferring his jurisprudence from hadith proof-texts. The imam accepted Al-Bayhaqi's advice and abandoned its completion
- Al-Mu`tasar fi Mukhtasar, an abridgment of Al-Muzani's abridgment in Shafi'i fiqh
- Al-Silsila in fiqh
- Al-Tabsira fi al-Waswasa on acts of worship
- Al-Tadhkira
- Al-Tafsir al-Kabir, reported by Abd al-Ghafir al-Farsi in his history of Naysabur to contain, for each verse, a different explanation according to ten different disciplines or perspectives.
- Al-Ta'liqa

== See also ==
- List of Ash'aris

== Bibliography ==
- Gibril Fouad Haddad (2 May 2015). "Abu Muhammad al-Juwayni (d. 438 AH)". The Biographies of the Elite Lives of the Scholars, Imams & Hadith Masters. As-Sunnah Foundation of America. pp. 187–188.
- Mehdi Berriah, Mohamad El-Merheb (16 August 2021). Professional Mobility in Islamic Societies (700-1750) - New Concepts and Approaches. Brill. p. 162. ISBN 9789004467637.
- A. Kevin Reinhart (January 1995). Before Revelation The Boundaries of Muslim Moral Thought. State University of New York Press. p. 122. ISBN 9781438417066.
- Jonathan Brown (30 September 2007). The Canonization of Al-Bukhārī and Muslim The Formation and Function of the Sunnī Ḥadīth Canon. Brill. p. 168. ISBN 9789047420347.
- A. Kevin Reinhart (8 December 2015). Descriptive Catalogue of the Garrett Collection (Persian, Turkish, Indic). Princeton University Press. p. 496. ISBN 9781400877157.
- Clifford Edmund Bosworth, M.S.Asimov (1992). History of Civilizations of Central Asia. Vol. 4. Motilal Banarsidass. p. 136. ISBN 9788120815964.
- Hazem Abu Ghazaleh (17 August 2018). Questions and Answers on Sufism. Lulu Press. p. 247. ISBN 9780244105839.
- Ibrahim al-Bajuri (2016). THE GIFT OF THE SEEKER ON THE JEWEL OF DIVINE UNIFICATION تحفة المريد شرح جوهرة التوحيد [انكليزي]. Dar Al-Kotob Al-Ilmiyah. p. 39. ISBN 9782745180186.
