= Abu Uthman al-Sabuni =

11th-century Islamic scholar

Imam Abu Uthman al-Sabuni
- أبو عثمان الصابوني
- Title: Shaykh al-Islām; Al-Ḥāfiẓ

Personal life
- Born: 983 Herat
- Died: 1057 (aged 73–74) Nishapur
- Era: Islamic golden age
- Region: Khorasan
- Main interest(s): Aqidah, Fiqh, Hadith, Tafsir, Tasawwuf
- Occupation: Scholar, Jurist, Traditionist, Mufassir, Sufi, Preacher, Orator

Religious life
- Religion: Islam
- Denomination: Sunni
- Jurisprudence: Shafi'i
- Creed: Ash'ari

Muslim leader
- Influenced by: Al-Shafi'i Abu Hasan al-Ash'ari Abu Muhammad al-Juwayni Al-Hakim al-Nishapuri
- Influenced: Al-Bayhaqi Al-Qushayri Al-Wahidi

Al-Sabuni, Ismail bin Abdal-Rahman bin Ahmad bin Ismail bin Ibrahim bin Amir, Abu Uthman al-Sabuni al-Shafi'i also known as Abu Uthman al-Sabuni (Arabic: أبو عثمان الصابوني), was a Sunni scholar known for being the leading hadith expert in Khorasan, a jurist of great authority particularly in the Shafi'i school, a Qur'anic exegete, sufi, theologian, preacher, and orator. The Sunnis of his time called him the Shaykh al-Islām, and when they used this word they did not mean anyone else. He was eloquent in dialect, broad in knowledge, and was fluent in both Persian and Arabic. Al-Bayhaqi said: "He was the true Imam of the Muslims and the real Shaykh of Islam."

== Name ==
His nisba, "al-Sabuni", most likely derives from one of his forefathers having worked as a soap-maker (ṣābūnī), for a prominent family known as the Sabuniyya was well known in Nishapur.

== Life ==
Abu Uthman al-Sabuni was born in 373 AH (983 CE) in the town of Bushanj (Pushang) in the Herat region. Al-Sabuni's father, a prominent preacher of Nishapur who adhered to the Hanafi school before converting to Ash'ari theology after seeing the Prophet Muhammad in a dream, was killed in sectarian violence when al-Sabuni was nine years old. Following his father's death, Abu al-Tayyib al-Su'luki adopted the orphaned child.

Following his father's death, al-Sabuni was raised and educated by the renowned imam and saint Abu al-Tayyib al-Su'luki. He also benefited from the sermons and scholarly gatherings of Abu Ishaq al-Isfarayini and Ibn Furak. As he matured, these leading scholars came to admire his piety, exemplary character, intelligence, eloquence in both Arabic and Persian, exceptional memory, and profound knowledge of the Quran and Hadith. Ibn al-Su'luki would later attend al-Sabuni's dhikr gatherings and openly praise these qualities.

When Abu al-Tayyib al-Su'luki would deliver a sermon, young al-Sabuni out of pure reverence would turn his face away from his teacher and Murshid. Ibn al-Su'luki would tell him: "Face me and do not look away!" Al-Sabuni would reply, "I am ashamed to speak in your face." After that, Ibn al-Su'luki would instruct his other students to "observe his (al-Sabuni's) wisdom."

Apart from Abu al-Tayyib al-Suʿluki, from whom he benefited most extensively, al-Sabuni studied under his grandfather Ahmad ibn Ismaʿil, as well as al-Hakim al-Nishapuri, Abu Muhammad al-Juwayni and other prominent scholars in Nishapur. Although he spent most of his life in Nishapur, al-Sabuni regularly travelled to the Hejaz, Damascus, Jerusalem, Sarakhs, Herat, Isfahan, Jurjan, and Qazvin, where he studied with leading hadith scholars.

Al-Sabuni was the head of scholars in Nishapur for 20 years and held a sufi practise by performing dikhr gatherings (remembrance of Allah) for 70 years. His brother, Abu Yaʿla Ishaq ibn ʿAbd al-Rahman, was likewise a scholar of hadith and occasionally substituted for him in preaching and teaching. Al-Sabuni is also reported to have performed the pilgrimage (Hajj), during which he delivered sermons and scholarly lectures before gatherings of scholars in Khurasan, Azerbaijan, and Iraq.

He trained a large number of students including al-Bayhaqi, al-Qushayri, al-Wahidi, Abu Sa'd al-Mutwalli, and others. Al-Sabuni died in Nishapur on 3 Muharram 449 AH (12 March 1057 CE) and was buried in his father's madrasa in the district of Sikkat al-Harb. Ibn al-Sam'ani states that he personally visited his grave on several occasions.

== Family ==
Of his two sons, Abd Allah died in Azerbaijan while accompanying his father on pilgrimage during al-Sabuni's lifetime. His other son, Abd al-Rahman, who was also among his students, became a well-known hadith scholar and later served as a judge (qadi) in Azerbaijan. According to historical reports, one of al-Sabuni's daughters married Abu al-Fadl al-Furati (d. 1054), the ra'is (head) of Nishapur, who was later among the four leading figures targeted for arrest by Amid al-Mulk al-Kunduri during his persecution of the Ash'aris. Abd al-Ghafir al-Farsi preserves the biographies of al-Sabuni's three daughters: Fatima, Khadija, and Mubaraka in his Siyaq al-Tarikh. He records that they studied hadith under the "masters of al-asamm".

== Creed ==
Al-Sabuni was a staunch defender of the Ash'ari school. He would be given special titles for refuting deviants by highly acclaimed scholars such as "Sword of the Sunnah" and "Repeller of Bid'ah (false innovation)" by Abd al-Ghafir al-Farsi and was given the title "Plague of the Deviants" by his contemporary Abu Ishaq al-Isfarayini. Al-Sabuni was among the major scholars who signed the Ash'ari statement written by Imam al-Qushayri at the time where anti-Ash'ari propaganda was being spread.

Ibn Asakir narrated from Abu Uthman al-Sabuni that he would never go out to his teaching circle except with the book al-Ibāna by Abu al-Hasan al-Ash'ari in his hand, openly showing his admiration for it. Then Ibn Asakir said that the companions of al-Ash'ari used to firmly believe in what is in al-Ibāna with the strongest conviction and rely upon it with the utmost reliance. The Lebanese Hadith scholar and researcher, Gibril Fouad Haddad states the current al-Ibāna attributed to Imam al-Ash'ari is chainless, anonymous and forged by the Mujassimah (deviant anthropromorphists) with clear anti-Ash'ari and anti-Hanafi intentions. He also states the original and unaltered copy was in the hands of Ash'ari scholars such as Ibn Asakir, Abu Uthman al-Sabuni and others.

Ibn al-Subki reports the Karramiyya from Herat were threatened by the popularity and status of al-Sabuni in the region so they began to attribute his title falsely on Abu Isma'il 'Abdullah al-Harawi, the author of an anti-Ash'ari book 'Dhamm al-Kalam' against the Sunnis, with the same title Shaykh al-Islam.

== Reception ==
Al-Bayhaqi said: "I swear that the Imam Abu Abdallah al-Hakim in spite of his great age, Hadith Mastery, and Scholarly Status - used to get up for the Teacher, Imam Sabuni when he came in to see him and he used to call him "The Unmatched Teacher", making aware to the people of Imam Sabuni's great knowledge, his Merits (qualities) and Virtues, and repeat Imam Sabuni's spoken words in his own Discourse (lectures)."

== Works ==
Al-Sabuni writings demonstrate that he was a distinguished hadith scholar who taught for many years in Nishapur's central mosque. He was also highly respected in his region as a Sufi scholar. Owing to his modest and unassuming lifestyle, however, his works never achieved widespread fame, and relatively few manuscripts survived into later centuries. His following works include:

1. Aqidat al-Salaf wa Ashab al-Hadith ("The creed of the Pious Predecessors and People of Hadith") where he brings in narrations from the Salaf explaining their creed and principles of faith (Usul al-Din).
2. Tafsir al-Sabuni is a Quran commentary and is considered highly grounded in the sound transmission of orthodox exegetic hadith.
3. Al-Wasiyyah ("The Testament"). A brief treatise consisting of eight pages. Ibn al-Subki quotes its text from a copy that the author left, perhaps even composed in Damascus while travelling to perform the Hajj. The treatise appears to have been transcribed from al-Sabuni's dictation rather than written in his own hand.
4. Al-Arbaʿun fi al-Hadith ("Forty Hadith"). Al-Nawawi mentions this work in the introduction to his own Arba'un Hadith. It is also listed by Kâtip Çelebi and Baghdadi Ismaʿil Pasha.
5. Kitab al-Miʾatayn ("The Book of the Two Hundreds"). Ibn Hajar al-Asqalani states that the work contained 200 hadiths, 200 anecdotes, and 200 poems. Although Carl Brockelmann indicated that a manuscript was preserved in a library in Medina under catalogue number 102, later research has been unable to verify the existence of such a manuscript.
6. Kitab al-Intisar ("The Book of Victory")
7. Kitab al-Daʿawat ("The Book of Supplications"). Al-Bayhaqi states that he read an autograph manuscript of this work and cites passages from it in Al-Asma' wa al-Sifat.

== See also ==
- List of Ash'aris
