= The Proof in the Principles of Jurisprudence =

12th-century treatise

Al-Burhan Fi Usul al-Fiqh
- Author: Al-Juwayni
- Language: Arabic
- Subject: Principles of Islamic jurisprudence and Islamic Law
- Publication date: 12th century
- Publication place: Persia

Al-Burhan Fi Usul al-Fiqh (Arabic: البرهان في أصول الفقه) or The Proof in the Principles of Jurisprudence is a 12th-century treatise written by Imam al-Haramayn al-Juwayni the leading legal theorist of his time. A highly celebrated work of Al-Juwayni on Usul Al-Fiqh. It is regarded as one of the four pillars of the field of legal theory. The other three including 1. Al-Ghazali who authored al-Mustasfa fi 'ilm al-isul 2. Al-Qadi Abd al-Jabbar who authored al-Qadi's al-`Umad; 3. Abu al-Husayn al-Basri who authored al-Basri's al-Mu`tamad (commentary on al-`Umad).

== Content ==
This book discusses in detail the science of principles of jurisprudence which consists of eight main discussions, namely Al-Bayan (lucidity), Al-Ijma (consensus), Al-Qiyas (analogical reasoning), Al-Istidlal (deduction), Al-Tarihat (observation), Al-Naskh (abrogation), Al-Ijtihad (independent reasoning) and Al-Fatwa (ruling). The writing of the book begins with a discussion on how to learn a science in its Introduction and then followed by the core discussion of the book. Many scholars praised this book for being very comprehensive in explaining the science of Usul Al-Fiqh.

In his book Al-Burhan, al-Juwayni has touched on the subject of Sharia objectives explaining:

"One who cannot understand the inherent objectives in the Sharia orders and prohibitions, he cannot trace out the wisdom of legislating the Sharia.

In his book Al-Burhan, with a unanimous agreement amongst the legal scholars. He explains what a Mufti is supposed to be and do:

Regarding the qualities of a mufti and the disciplines that he must master: … it is imperative that the mufti must be a scholar of language, for the Shariah is [in] Arabic. … it is imperative that he be a scholar of syntax and parsing … it is imperative that he be a scholar of the Quran, for the Quran is the basis of all rulings …

Knowledge of textual abrogation is indispensable; and the science of the fundamentals of jurisprudence (usul) is the cornerstone of the whole subject … He should also know the various degrees of proofs and arguments … as well as their histories. [He should also know] the science of Hadith so that he can distinguish the authentic from the weak; and the acceptable from the apocryphal … [He should also know] jurisprudence.…

Moreover, having ‘legal intuition’ (fiqh al-nafs) is needed: it is the capital of anyone who derives legal rulings … scholars have summarized all this by saying that a mufti is ‘someone who independently knows all the texts and arguments for legal rulings’. ‘Texts’ refers to mastering language, Qura’nic exegesis and Hadith; while ‘arguments’ indicates mastering legal theory, analogical reasoning of the various kinds, as well as ‘legal intuition’ (fiqh al-nafs).

== See also ==
- List of Sunni books
- The End of the Quest in the Knowledge of the Shafi'i School
