= Al-Qushayri =

Islamic scholar and Sufi philosopher (986–1072)

- Title: Shaykh al-Islām

Personal life
- Born: 986 (AH 376)
- Died: 30 December 1072 (AH 465)
- Era: Islamic golden age
- Main interest(s): Tasawwuf, Islamic theology, Fiqh, Usul al-Fiqh, Hadith, Tafsir, Grammar
- Notable work: Al-Risala al-Qushayriyya
- Occupation: Muhaddith, Mufassir, Scholar, Muslim jurist, Theologian, Sufi

Religious life
- Religion: Islam
- Denomination: Sunni
- Jurisprudence: Shafi'i
- Creed: Ash'ari

Muslim leader
- Influenced by: Al-Shafi'i Abu Hasan al-Ash'ari Al-Hakim al-Nishapuri Ibn Furak Abu Ishaq al-Isfara'ini Al-Sulami

'Abd al-Karīm ibn Hawazin Abū al-Qāsim al-Qushayrī al-Naysābūrī (Persian: عبدالکریم قُشَیری, Arabic: عبد الكريم بن هوازن بن عبد الملك بن طلحة أبو القاسم القشيري; 986 – 30 December 1072) was an Arab Muslim scholar, theologian, jurist, legal theoretician, commentator of the Qur’an, muhaddith, grammarian, spiritual master, orator, poet, and an eminent scholar who mastered a number of Islamic sciences. Al-Qushayri, combined the routine instruction of a Shafi'i law specialist and Hadith expert (muhaddith) with a solid slant to mysticism and ascetic lifestyle.

He was born in Nishapur which is in Khorasan province in Iran. This region was widely known as a center of Islamic civilization up to the 13th Century CE. He was the grandfather of the hadith scholar Abd al-Ghafir al-Farsi, a student of Imam al-Haramayn al-Juwayni.

== Biography ==
Al Qushayri was born into a privileged Arab family from among the Banu Qushayr who had settled near Nishapur. As a young man he received the education of a country squire of the time: adab, the Arabic language, chivalry and weaponry (istiʿmāl al-silāḥ), but that all changed when he journeyed to the city of Nishapur and was introduced to the Sufi shaykh Abū ʿAlī al-Daqqāq. Daqqaq was a student of al-Nasrabadhi (d. 367/977), who was the foremost ascetic of his time in Khorasan. Al-Nasrabadhi himself was a student of Abu Bakr al-Shiblì (d. 946), the student of Junayd Al-Baghdadi.

Daqqāq later became the master and teacher of the mystical ways to Qushayri. He later married the daughter of Daqqāq, Fatima. After the death of Daqqāq, Qushayri became the successor of his master and father-in-law and became the leader of mystic assemblies in the madrasa that Abu Ali al-Daqqāq built in 1001 CE, which later became known as al-Madrasa al-Qushayriyya or "the school of the Qushayri family". Qushayri was also the student of Al-Sulami, another student of al-Nasrabadhi (d. 367/977).

In later years Qushayri performed the pilgrimage in the company of Abu Muhammad al-Juwayni (d. 438/1047), the father of the great Imam al-Haramayn al-Juwayni, as well as traveling to Baghdad and the Hijaz. During these travels he heard Hadith from various prominent Hadith scholars. Upon his return he began teaching Hadith, which is something he is famous for. He returned to Baghdad where the Caliph al-Qa'im had him perform hadith teachings in his palace. After his return to Khurāsān, political unrest in the region between the Ḥanafī and Ashʿarī-Shāfiʿī factions in the city forced him to leave Nishapur, but he was eventually able to return and lived there until his death in 1072/465, when the Seljuq vizier Nizam al-Mulk re-established the balance of power between the Ḥanafīs and the Shāfiʿīs. He left behind six sons and several daughters between Fatima and his second wife and was buried near al-Madrasa al-Qushayriyya, next to his father in-law Abū ʿAlī al-Daqqāq

== Influence ==
Laṭā'if al-Isharat bi-Tafsīr al-Qur'ān is a famous work of al-Qushayri that is a complete commentary of the Qur'an. He determined that there were four levels of meaning in the Qur'an. First, the ibara which is the meaning of the text meant for the mass of believers. Second, the ishara, only available to the spiritual elite and lying beyond the obvious verbal meaning. Third, laṭā’if, subtleties in the text that were meant particularly for saints. And finally, the ḥaqā’iq, which he said were only comprehensible to the prophets. This text placed him among the elite of the Sufi mystics and is widely used as a standard of Sufi thought.

His fame however, is due mostly to his al-Risala al-Qushayriyya (or the Epistle on Sufism). This text is essentially a reminder to the people of his era that Sufis had authentic ancestral tradition, as well as a defence of Sufism against the doubters that rose during that time of his life. Al-Qushayri repeatedly acknowledges his debt to, and admiration for, his Sufi master throughout his Risala. Daqqaq was instrumental in introducing Qushayri to another outstanding Sufi authority of Khurasan, al-Sulami, who is quoted on almost every page of the Risala. It has sections where al-Qushayrī discusses the creed of the Sufis, mentions important and influential Sufis from the past, and establishes fundamentals of Sufi terminology, giving his own interpretation of those Sufi terms. Al-Qushayrī finally goes through specific practices of Sufism and the techniques of those practices. This text has been used by many Sufi saints in later times as a standard, as is obvious from the many translations into numerous languages.

== Legacy ==
Abd al-Ghafir al-Farsi said about his grandfather (Al-Qushayri):

The absolute Imam, jurist, theologian, legal theorist, the interpreter of the Qu'ran, a man of letters, grammarian, writer/poet, the master of his time, God's secret among His creation, the axis of reality, source of happiness, the pole of masterhood, one who joined the Shari'a and the Truth. He was knowledgeable in the foundations of the Ash'ari creed and in the branches of the Shafi'i school of though.

Abu al-Hasan al-Bakhirzi, the author of the book Dimyah al-Qasr, said about him:

[He was] one who gathered all kinds of goodness, the one to whom all things were facilitated, and who held the bridle of every lowly thing. So, if he were to shout at a stone, it would dissolve. And if Iblis were to attend his gathering of remembrance, he would repent. He was extremely distinguished with sound logic, and an expert in the theology of the school of al-Ash’ari. The breadth of his knowledge was almost beyond human capacity. His words were beneficial and precious gems for the seekers of benefit. Verily, the feet of his pulpit are the pillows of the Gnostics. When the Sufi Shaykhs had agreed upon the favor he possessed and saw his nearness and allotment from the al-Haqq, they faded before him and disappeared in comparison with him. His carpet rolled them up in its margins. They were divided between looking at him and contemplating him. He has poems that crown the heads of his noble ministers. Thus, his furthest hopes are achieved through him.

Shaykh Amin considers Imam al-Qushayri's work to be an inspiration to the better-known work of Al-Ghazali:

If you understand the times of Imam al-Qushayri, I think it is a prelude to Imam al-Ghazali, and his book [al-Risala al-Qushayriyya], actually is, I would say, a blueprint for Imam al-Ghazali’s Ihya 'Ulum al-Din.

== Works ==
Among Imam al-Qushayri's writings besides al-Risala al-Qushayriyya and Laṭā'if al-Isharat bi-Tafsīr al-Qur'an include the following:

- Al-Risala al-Qushayriyya
- Arba’un fi al-Hadith
- Istifadah al-Muradat
- Balaghah al-Maqasid
- Al-Ta’khir fi 'Ilm al-Tadhkir fi Ma’ani Ism Allah Ta’ala
- Al-Taysir fi 'Ilm al-Tafsir
- Uyun al-Ujubah fi Funun al-As’ilah
- Al-Fusul fi al-Usul
- Kitab al-Mi’raj, an account of the Night Journey
- Al-Muntaha fi Nukat Ula al-Nuha.
- Nasikh al-Hadith wa Mansukhihi
- Nahw al-Qulub
- Hayat al-Arwah wa al-Dalil ila Tariq al-Salah
- Shikayah Ahl al-Sunnah bi Hikayah Ma Nalahum min al-Mihnah
- Manthur al-Khitab fi Shuhud al-Albab

== Sayings ==
I heard the master Abu Ali al-Daqqaq say: "Al-Jurayri saw al-Junayd in a dream [after his death] and asked him: ‘How are you, Abu al-Qasim?’ He answered: ‘Gone are all those allegorical allusions (isharat), and all those unequivocal expressions ('ibarat) have vanished. Only those praises of God that we used to utter in the morning have benefited us [in the Hereafter]!’ "

== See also ==
- List of Sufis
- List of Ash'aris
- List of Muslim theologians
- List of Iranian scientists and scholars
- Tassawwuf
