= Ilm =

Ilm or ILM may refer to:

== Acronyms ==
- Identity Lifecycle Manager, a Microsoft Server Product
- I Love Money, a TV show on VH1
- Independent Loading Mechanism, a mounting system for CPU sockets
- Industrial Light & Magic, an American motion picture visual effects company
- Information lifecycle management, for computer data storage systems
- Infrastructure Lifecycle Management
- Institute of Leadership and Management, the UK awarding body for leadership and management qualifications
- Internal Labour Market
- International Legal Materials, a law journal published by the American Society of International Law
- Inner limiting membrane, the innermost layer of the retina
- Insertion Loss Measurement, measurement of the loss, or attenuation, of a fibre-optic component or system
- Wilmington International Airport (IATA airport code), in Wilmington, North Carolina

== Geography ==
- Ilm (Bavaria), a river in Germany, tributary to the Abens
- Ilm (Thuringia), a river in Germany, tributary to the Saale
- Ilm-Kreis, a district in Germany

== Other uses ==
- Ilm (Arabic), Arabic for knowledge, referring to knowledge of Islam and natural/social phenomenon
- I Love Music (forum), an internet music forum based in Canada
- Ilmr, a goddess in Norse mythology, sometimes written as Ilm
