= Fara'id al-Simtayn =

Fara'id al-Simtayn is a hadith collection by the Sunni scholar Ibrahim b Muhammad b Himaway al Juwayni, who died in 1322 (722 AH). He was born in 1246 (644 AH).
