= The End of the Quest in the Knowledge of the Shafi'i School =

Shafi'i fiqh book written by al-Juwayni

Nihayat al-Matlab fi Dirayat al-Madhhab
- Author: Al-Juwayni
- Language: Arabic
- Subject: Shafi'i school and Islamic jurisprudence
- Publication date: 12th century
- Publication place: Persia

Nihayat al-Matlab fi Dirayat al-Madhhab (Arabic: نهاية المطلب في دراية المذهب) or The End of the Quest in the Knowledge of the Shafi'i School is one of the earliest Shafi'i fiqh books written by Imam al-Haramayn al-Juwayni the leading Shafi'i jurist of his time. It is said to be the largest work done in the Shafi'i school with a massive collection of over 21 volumes. Considered his magnum opus, which Ibn Asakir said had no precedent in Islam. It served as a major reference for all the later scholars after the 5th century of hijri.

== Content ==
This book is a commentary of the famous work, Mukhtasar al-Muzani authored by Al-Muzani who was the famous student of Al-Shafi'i. It also contains other valuable information such as the way the founder (Al-Shafi'i) worked out the differences in opinions of the companions. It is known the founder of the Shafi'i school named Imam Al-Shafi'i authored the famous Kitab al-Umm. His student Al-Muzani abridged it and circulated as Mukhtasar al-Muzani. After 150 years later, Al-Juwayni compiled it and circulated as Nihayat al-Matlab fi Dirayat al-Madhhab. The Egyptian scholar, Sheikh Muhammad Ibrahim al-Hifnawi clarifies that according to later Shafi'i authorities that the Nihaya is actually an abridgement of several famous works authored by Al-Shafi'i, especially al-Umm and al-Imla, in addition to this, the Nihaya contains abridgements of Al Buwayti's and Al-Muzani's works. Early authorities report that Nihaya is the only abridgement of Mukhtasar al-Muzani.

== Authors approach ==
- 1- The Imam of the Two Holy Mosques explained in his book this summary of Al-Muzani, so the summary is his mainstay, and according to his Sunnah and arrangement he proceeded.
- 2- Evidence from the Qur’an, Sunnah, consensus, and analogy, while mentioning the aspects of inference.
- 3- The book is rightfully considered a jurisprudential encyclopedia, as al-Juwayni collected in it the sayings of the imams of the madhhab, and he favored and corrected them. He also collected the sayings of other schools of thought and discussed their statements and evidence.
- 4- The book is considered one of the richest books of the forerunners in the branches, as the compiler expanded on it, until it became a reference that those who came after it could not dispense with. Rather, it has become, according to many imams of the school, the reference that replaced what preceded it.
- 5- The researcher finds in it a rich linguistic eloquence, as al-Juwayni multiplied in it linguistic inferences and evidence.

== Reception ==
Ibn al-Najjar said: "It includes forty volumes. The importance of this book is evident in the fact that many of the Shafi’i jurisprudence books relied on it." Al-Nawawi considered it in Al-Majmoo one of the four books that are considered the basis of the doctrine.

Ibn Hajar al-Haytami said in Al-Tuhfa:

"Since the imam wrote his book “The End”, people did not occupy themselves except with the words of the imam); This is because the approved books that were written after were derived from it and relied on it in the first place. This book, although it was based on Mukhtasar al-Muzni, did not follow the methodology of the refined explanation."

== Commentary ==
This book was then summarized in a comprehensive manner by his foremost pupil Al-Ghazali who authored a celebrated work entitled Al-Wajiz fi Fiqh al-Imam al-Shafi'i.

== See also ==
- Book of Demonstration on Jurisprudence
