= Abu al-Qasim al-Rafi'i =

Sunni Muslim Shafi`i scholar (d. 1226)

Imam Abu al-Qasim al-Rafi'i
- أبو القاسم الرافعي
- Title: Shaykh al-Islam; Hujjat al-Islam al-Shaykhayn; Al-Ḥāfiẓ

Personal life
- Born: 1160 Qazvin
- Died: 1226 (aged 65–66) Qazvin
- Era: Islamic golden age
- Region: Persia
- Notable work(s): Al-'Aziz Sharh al-Wajiz; Al-Muharrar; Al-Tadwin fi Dhikr Akhbar Qazvin
- Occupation: Scholar, Jurist, Muhaddith, Mufassir, Legal Theoretician, Historian

Religious life
- Religion: Islam
- Denomination: Sunni
- Jurisprudence: Shafi'i
- Creed: Ash'ari

Muslim leader
- Influenced by: Al-Shafi'i Abu Hasan al-Ash'ari Al-Ghazali
- Influenced: Al-Mundhiri Ibn al-Salah Al-Nawawi

Abd al-Karīm b. Muḥammad Ibn 'Abd al-Karīm b. al-Faḍl b. al-Ḥusayn b. al-Ḥasan Imām al-Din Abū al-Qāsim al-Rāfi'i al-Qazwini, who was better known as Abū al-Qāsim al-Rāfi'i (Arabic: أبو القاسم الرافعي) was a Sunni Muslim scholar based in Qazvin. He was a well-known jurisconsult, legal theoretician, hadith scholar, Qur'anic exegete, historian, ascetic, and muhaqqiq (researcher). Shah Waliullah Dehlawi categorized al-Rafi'i as one of the scholars who attained mujtahid mutlaq (absolute/autonomous ijtihad). Al-Rāfi'i, along with al-Nawawi, are leading jurists of the earlier classical age, known by the Shafi'i school as the Two Shaykhs (al-Shaykhayn). As per Taj al-Din al-Subki, the purpose of this title is to indicate their superior standing within the school, as al-Rāfi'i and al-Nawawi were the primary sources for the later school's legal doctrines. Furthermore, al-Rafi'i was chosen by a host of scholars to be the mujaddid of the sixth/twelfth century.

== Lineage ==
Imam al-Rāfi'i said, the basis of his name to al-Rāfi'i refers to al-Rāfi'iyyah, that is, the Arabs who settled in Qazwin during era of the Tabi'un or Tabi' al-Tabi'in. He also stated that his lineage is linked to Rafi Ibn Khadij, a companion of the Islamic prophet Muhammad.

== Early life ==
=== Birth ===
Al-Rāfi'i was born in the year of 555 AH / 1160 AD in the city of Qazvin which is the capital of the Qazvin province, which is located approximately 130 kilometres west of Tehran, the national capital of Iran.

=== Education ===
Imam al-Rāfi'i was born into a family of scholars. His father was a great scholar in the state of Qazwin, Muhammad Ibn 'Abd al-Karim Ibn al-Fadl Ibn al-Husain Ibn al-Hasan Imām al-Din Abū al-Qāsim al-Rāfi'i al-Qazwini. Nicknamed Abu al-Fadl, his father is a jurist, an eloquent debater, a mufti who is accurate in giving fatwas in addition to having deep knowledge regarding the undisputed 'ulūm al-Quran and 'ulūm al-Hadith. Imam al-Rafi'i's father was known to have studied under al-Ghazali's disciples. While his mother is also a very pious person who is a reference in Qazwin, especially in matters related to women. Since childhood, Imam al-Rāfi'i has dabbled with knowledge by learning through his father in 569H when he was 14 years old. The preparation to seek knowledge has been planted as early as childhood.

This can be observed through what Imam al-Rāfi'i himself said about his father's concern by saying: "He (al-Rāfi'i's father) loved his children very much and was concerned about their affairs. Very strict in disciplining and educating them. Among his greatest kindnesses to me was his careful attitude in my education matters from the aspect of food and clothing". In fact, his father was very careful in the matter of the sustenance given to his children where he did not give food and clothing to al-Rāfi'i and the other children except from something good. This shows how al-Rāfi'i's father cares about providing an atmosphere that can stimulate his children to follow in his footsteps as an heir of knowledge and continue his father's legacy as a Qazwin scholar. Al-Rāfi‘i is not the only one who inherited his father's knowledge, even his other brother Abū al-Fa'ail was also born as a jurist and hadith expert.

Al-Rāfi'i constantly attend all of his lessons since from a very young age and meet many knowledge seekers who would flock to his father. Under his father, he would study the branches of Fiqh including its principles. He would study Tafsir, Hadith, and Arabic sciences until he mastered them.

=== Teachers ===
His most prominent teachers include:

- Abu al-Fadl (his father)
- Ahmed bin Ismail (his mothers uncle)
- Abu Mansur al-Daylami, author of Musnad al-Firdous
- Abū al-ʻAlāʼ al-Hamadhānī
- Abū al-Fat bin al-Ba'ti
- Abū Sulayman al-Zubairi
- Imam Abū Sulaiman Ahmad bin Hasnawih
- 'Abdullah bin Abi al-Futuh

== Scholarly life ==
=== Scholastic expertise ===
Imam Al-Rāfi'i was regarded as the most learned person of his era because of his proficiency in both science and Sharia law. He was the Shaykh of Shafi'is of his time and was favoured over others. If the title two Shaykhs are mentioned, it only pertains to al-Rāfi'i and al-Nawawi. He was a prominent Hadith scholar in his day, renowned for his sharp memory and mastery of several branches of the Hadith, including its rules, principles, defects, weak and authentic narrations, abrogated narrations, its forms, jurisprudence, and meanings. He was a diligent legal theorist, a highly motivated jurist who mastered all branches of jurisprudence, and an unparalleled investigator among the great scholars of the Shafi'i masters, his fame spread among Arabs and non-Arabs. He was knowledgeable in the Arabic philological, linguistic, and grammar fields. He was well-known for his piety, asceticism and had mastered Tasawwuf. He had a flawless recitation and was an accomplished debater and orator. He was very skilled in Quran exegesis and history. With his various scientific accomplishments, he was bestowed with the esteemed title of Shaykh al-Islam.

=== Career ===
Al-Rāfi'i led a council in Qazvin and taught Quran exegesis, Hadith and Islamic jurisprudence. His renown reputation extended far East and far West. This would cause a great number of students from all regions to visit Qazvin. He conducted his research and authored books in his hometown. He would also deliver Khutbah in Qazvin's main mosque.

=== Students ===
Among his most prominent students:

- Aziz Al-Din Muhammad (his son)
- Al-Mundhiri
- Ibn al-Salah
- Abu al-Thana Mahmoud Ibn Saeed al-Qazwini al-Tausi (his nephew)
- Abu Al-Fath Abd Al-Hadi Ibn Abd Al-Karim Al-Qaisi,
- Ibn al-Sukkari
- Khatib al-Muqayyas

== Death ==
Ibn Khallikān recorded al-Rāfi'i's death in the month of Dhul-Qa’dah in the year: 623 AH (1226 AD) and was buried in Qazvin.

== Asceticism and creed ==
Imam al-Rāfi'i was a man of asceticism and humility. Scholars have mentioned that he was characterized by piety, asceticism, and devotion, and was occupied with knowledge and worship. Al-Nawawi said of him: “He had a firm standing in righteousness, and many miracles were vouchsafed to him.”

=== Creed ===
Imam al-Rāfi'i adhered to the Ash'ari doctrine. Ibn Hajar al-Asqalani said: I read from Sheikh Salah al-Din (al-Safadi) that he said: “In the year 740, a woman from the descendants of al-Imām al-Rāfi'ī came to al-Imām Taqi al-Din al-Subki, and she read a portion from the creed that al-Rāfi'ī had written. It was beautiful and eloquent as his usual works, and upon the Madhhab of Ahl al-Sunnah.”

== Legacy and contribution to the Shafi'i school ==
Abu al-Qasim al-Rāfi'i is acknowledged as one of the most wondrous scholars within the Shafi'is school. He is credited of reviving the once dead science of fiqh. According to Ibn al-Subki, To fiqh, al-Rāfi'i was a full moon that the sun and the moon fled from due to his immense brilliance. When he rushed down the routes, he found wajs and transmitted qawls, making him a racehorse not to be caught by other horses.

The emergence of Imam al-Rāfi'i was very significant with the reality of the development of the madhab at that time. This is because since the death of Imam al-Shafi'i until the time of Imam al-Rafi'i, the jurisprudential writings of the Shafi'i school have been produced in great abundance. Over the course of four centuries, the works of the scholars of the school have been scattered all over the place. The authors come from various academic and geographical backgrounds, starting from Egypt in the west to the east reaching Central Asia or called Bilad Ma Wara' al-Nahr which today covers the countries of Uzbekistan, Tajikistan and southwestern Kazakhstan. Due to the lack of modern communication technology, it is certain that the works that are produced in various forms and at different times have deficiencies that need to be corrected, whether it is a mistake in reciting a law that contradicts the proposal of a school, a successful legal practice or ijtihads that are strange (shadhdhah).

He lived in the time where fiqh began to be abandoned and was in a period of division and confusion among the Shafi'i school. His appearance was considered timely when the Shafi'i school was split into two streams, namely al-Iraqiyyin and al-Khurasaniyyin who demanded an effort to integrate the two schools and unite them under the same path. The thirteenth century saw the beginning of an incremental transformation. Early school founders' teachings were once again examined, under the direction of Shafi'i jurists such Abu al-Qasim al-Rafi'i and Muhyi al-Din al-Nawawi. The school's course was changed by this action. Before these two scholars, the goal of jurists was to finish the law on behalf of the founder of their own schools by answering the new questions. Though there were new routes taken, this conviction persisted. These included fixing errors in the founders' views' attributions and, more crucially, evaluating the school doctrines in light of the standard of sound reasoning and supporting data from the Quran and the Sunna, the two primary sources of law.

Through his contribution into his school, he reviewed all the opinions of his predecessors weighing it according to the strength of the evidence, and determining its ranks. He revised the doctrine, and edited the sayings, opinions, aspects, and methods. He thoroughly investigated the approved or preferred opinion in the Shafi’i school of thought, and collected its methods in brief phrases. He had arguments and preferences for the statements according to the evidence on which he relied, and he did not limit himself to preference in matters of disagreement, but rather worked to liberate and refine the doctrine. He paved the way for those who came after him, and followed his example in the method of weighing evidences. He made additional investigations in comparative jurisprudence and complex issues of disagreement. He was a pioneer who founded many jurisprudential terminologies. He divided it into branches and organized jurisprudence in a way it would be easier for people to learn and understand. He was very knowledgeable in narrations and jurisprudential differences among the Sahaba and those who came after them (Tabi'in) including their interpretations of ahadiths. He would gather all their opinions in order to strengthen each preferred position held by the school. He did this so that the work and fatwa are based on what is most likely when the evidence is strong, since the multiplicity of sayings on a single issue may lead to the confusion of thought among the general public, and their falling into a problem or difficulties which was a common occurrence in his time.

== Reception ==
Al-Nawawi said: “He is an Imam who is an expert and has extensive knowledge in the school and many other sciences.”

Ibn al-Salah said: “I do not think I have ever seen someone like him in the land of 'Ajam (non-Arab lands). He mastered a variety of knowledge, a commendable personality and has left a valuable contribution.”

Al-Dhahabi said: “He is the Shaykh al-Shafi'iyyah, a scholar for non-Arabs and Arabs and a religious leader."

Taj al-Din al-Subki described Imam al-Rāfi'i as follows: “There is no one who writes like him in any school and does not illuminate the ummah as he illuminates it in the darkness. He is a persistent person in the sciences of sharia whether interpretation, hadith and usul. A person who stood out in his time in imparting knowledge, research, giving guidance and also writing. In the field of jurisprudence, he is a pillar for those who seek the certainty and support of the authors, as if jurisprudence was dead and then he revived, spread and established its pillar after being killed and buried by ignorance.”

Ibn Kathir when recording the character of Imam al-Rāfi'i said: "He is the storehouse of knowledge of the Imams of the Shafi'i school who stands out for those who research. He is referred to by all the jurists among our followers in this era in most districts and states.

== Works ==
As a prolific writer, Imam al-Rāfi'i has left a treasure of his writings which are very valuable not only in the field of jurisprudence as a pioneer in the purification of the school in his time but also in other fields such as interpretation, Hadith and history. Among his main works are as follows:

1. Al-'Aziz Sharh al-Wajiz, known also as al-Sharh al-Kabir ("The Great Commentary"), this book is considered his magnum opus and it's a multi-voluminous commentary of the book al-Wajiz written by Imam al-Ghazali.
2. Al-Sharh al-Saghir (The Minor Commentary), this book is also a commentary of the book al-Wajiz by Imam al-Ghazāli but the commentary is more concise than the book Al-‘Aziz Sharh al-Wajiz.
3. Al-Muharrar, this book is a description of al-Wajiz written by Imam al-Ghazāli which was later summarized in Minhaj al-Talibin authored by Imam al-Nawawi. This book brings together the laws of fiqh in addition to the opinions that have been taught by Imam al-Rāfi'i.
4. Al-Tadwin fi Dhikr Akhbar Qazvin ("The Chronicle in Mentioning the Reports of Qazvin"), is a popular book regarding the history of the Qazvin and listing all the notable biographies who lived or visited the city.
5. Sharh al-Musnad al-Shafi'i, is a famous commentary on Musnad al-Shafi'i authored by Imam al-Shafi'i in two large volumes.
6. Al-Tadhnib, also a fiqh book that discusses furu' problems in the madhhab.
7. Al-Amāli, a book that brings together Hadiths along with their sanads (chains) that he quoted from his teachers about surah al-Fatihah which also included his own commentary.
8. Al-Ijāz Fi Akhtār al-Hijāz, is a brief treatise about the benefits obtained by Imam al-Rāfii while traveling while performing Hajj. According to Tāsh Kubrā Zādah (1985) there was a mistake when copying the title of the book by the copyist. Its real title is al-Khatarāt or Khawātir al-Hijaz
9. Al-Mahmoud fi Al-Fiqh, is an extensive work on jurisprudence ranging in 8 volumes. However, the author did not complete it.

== Bibliography ==
- Muhamad Ismail Abdullah (May 2016). Imam al-Rafi'i and his Contribution to the Shafi'i School (in Malay). Selangor Islamic University. p. 1-8.
