= Abd al-Ghafir al-Farsi =

12th-century Muslim scholar

- Title: Al-Ḥāfiẓ

Personal life
- Born: 451/1059
- Died: 529H/1135
- Era: Islamic Golden Age
- Region: Persia
- Main interest(s): Hadith, History, Grammar
- Occupation: Muhaddith, Scholar

Religious life
- Religion: Islam
- Denomination: Sunni
- Jurisprudence: Shafi'i
- Creed: Ash'ari

Muslim leader
- Influenced by: Al-Shafi'i Abu Hasan al-Ash'ari Al-Qushayri Al-Juwayni Al-Ghazali

Abd al-Ghafir ibn Ismail ibn Abd al-Ghafir ibn Muhammad al-Farsi (Arabic: عبد الغافر بن اسماعيل بن عبد الغافر بن محمد الفارسي) was a renowned Persian Sunni muhaddith, historian and grammarian of the highest rank. He was a student of Imam al-Haramayn al-Juwayni. He was contemporary, and first biographer of Imam Al-Ghazali. He was also the grandson of the great Imam Al-Qushayri.

== Biography ==
He was born within the year 451/1058 and at the age of five, he was able to ponder the Qur'an and might rehash the statement of creed in his local dialect (Persian). He considered the Shafi'i statute with concentration for four years beneath Imam al-Haramayn al-Juwayni, the author of Nihayat al-Matlab, which is a treatise on the convention of the Shafi'i school and on the focuses of contention. He was a maternal grandson of the Imam Abu Kasim al-Khusairi and learned from him an extraordinary amount of hadiths, as too from his grandmother Fatima, the girl of Abu ali ad-Dakkak, his maternal uncles Ali saad and Abu said, the children of Abu Kasim al-Kushairi, his possess guardians Abdu Abd Alla Ismail and Amat ar-Rahim al-Kushairi girl to Abdal Karim al-Kushairi and a number of other instructors.

He at that point cleared out Nishapur and continued to Khwarazm, where he proceeded to meet and study under the foremost famous masters of that nation, and opened a private course of informational of students. He voyage from there to Ghazni, and after that to India, instructing the Hadiths and clarifying his grandfather's work, the Lataif al-Iskharat (substle Indications). On his return to Nishapur he directed as a minister, and, amid a number of a long time, he gave lessons each Monday evening within the Akil mosque; he at that point composed his various works, of which rule are the Muslim, in which he clarifies the obscure focuses of Sahih Muslim and does an abridgement of Al-Hakim's History of Nishapur, which work he wrapped up towards the end of 518 AH; in which he explains the uncommon expressions happening within the hadiths; he composed other than numerous other instructive works. Abd al-Ghafir al-Farsi died in 529/1135 in Nishapur.

== Works ==
Amongst the most famous works of Abd al-Ghafir al-Farsi are:

- Al-Bayan al-Tareekh Nishapur (The History of Nishapur)
- Al-Mufhim of Sahih-Muslim
- Majma al-Gharaaib Fi Gharib al-Hadith (The book was printed and verified by Abdullah bin Nasser bin Muhammad Al-Qarni (Umm Al-Qura University - 1409 AH / 1989 AD))

== See also ==
- List of Ash'aris
