= Musnad al-Firdous =

Hadith collection by Abū Manṣūr al-Daylamī

Musnad al-Firdaws
- Author: Imam Abū Manṣūr al-Daylamī
- Language: Arabic
- Genre: Hadith collection

Musnad al-Firdaws (Arabic: مسند الفردوس) is a collection of Hadiths compiled by the Islamic scholar Abū Manṣūr al-Daylamī (d. 558 AH/1162 CE).

== Description ==
It contains almost three thousand (3000) hadiths according to Al-Maktaba Al-Shamela. This book is not popular among Islamic scholars because the chain of narrators are not specifically given while quoting Hadith.

== Publications ==
The book has been published by many publishers but mainly in Arabic language:

- Musnad al-Firdaws (مخطوطة مسند الفردوس), published by Maktaba Ustadh Doctor Mohammad bin Torkey, Turkey مكتبة الأستاذ الدكتور محمد بن تركي التركي.
- Al-Firdaws bima'thūr al-Khiṭāb. Edited by al-Saʿīd ibn Basīūnī Zaghlūl. Beirut: Dār al-Kutub al-ʿIlmiyya, 1st ed. 1986 CE. 5 volumes.

== See also ==
- List of Sunni books
- Kutub al-Sittah
- Sahih Muslim
- Sahih al-Tirmidhi
- Sunan Abu Dawood
- Sunan ibn Majah
- Muwatta Malik
- Majma al-Zawa'id
