= Al-Muzani =

Islamic jurist and theologian

Isma'il ibn Yahya Al-Muzani

Personal life
- Born: 174 AH (790/791 CE) CE
- Died: 264 AH (877/878 CE) CE Cairo, Egypt
- Era: Abbasid Caliphate

Religious life
- Religion: Islam
- Denomination: Sunni
- Jurisprudence: Shafi'i

Muslim leader
- Influenced by: Al-Shafi'i, Ahmad ibn Hanbal
- Influenced: Al-Tahawi

Abū Ibrāhīm Ismā'īl ibn Yahyā Ibn Ismā'īl Ibn 'Amr Ibn Muslim Al-Muzanī Al-Misrī (791–878 AD/ 174-264 Hijri) was an Islamic jurist and theologian and one of leading member of Shafi'i school. A native of Cairo, he was a close disciple and companion of Imam Shafi'i. He has been called Al-Imam, al-'Allamah, Faqih al-Millah, and 'Alam az-Zahad. He was skilled in the legal verdicts and became one of the inheritors of Imam Shafi’i. Imam Shafi’i said about him: "al-Muzani is the standard-bearer of my school". He lived an ascetic life and died at the age of 89 on the 24th of Ramadan 264/30 May 878 and was buried near Imam al-Shafi'i.

== Works ==
Initially a Hanafi, Muzani changed to the Shafi school upon meeting Al-Shafi. He wrote several works, his most famous one being his abridgement of Imam Shafi’i's al-Umm entitled Mukhtasar al-Muzani. An abridgement has been done to this work a 150 years later by the great jurist known as Imam al-Haramayn al-Juwayni who authored a celebrated work entitled Nihayat al-Matlab fi Dirayat al-Madhhab and is considered the only known abridgement of Mukhtasar al-Muzani. He wrote several other works such as Sharh al-Sunnah, al-Jami’ al-Kabir, al-Saghir, al-Manthur, al-Targhib fi al-‘Ilm, al-Masa’il al-Mu’tabarah, and al-Watha’iq.

After Shafiis death he was chastised by many traditionalists for accepting the doctrine that the Quran was created. He then abandoned this position but his reputation was tarnished to such an extent he was not allowed to teach for over a decade.

He was known to have debated many scholars on a variety of issues, mostly with the Hanafi scholars. He is also the uncle of Abu Ja'far al-Tahawi, an important scholar and Imam of the Hanafi school. Muzani was apparently in shock over Tahawis decision to leave to Shafism for Hanafism.
