= The Revival of the Religious Sciences =

12th-century book by al-Ghazali

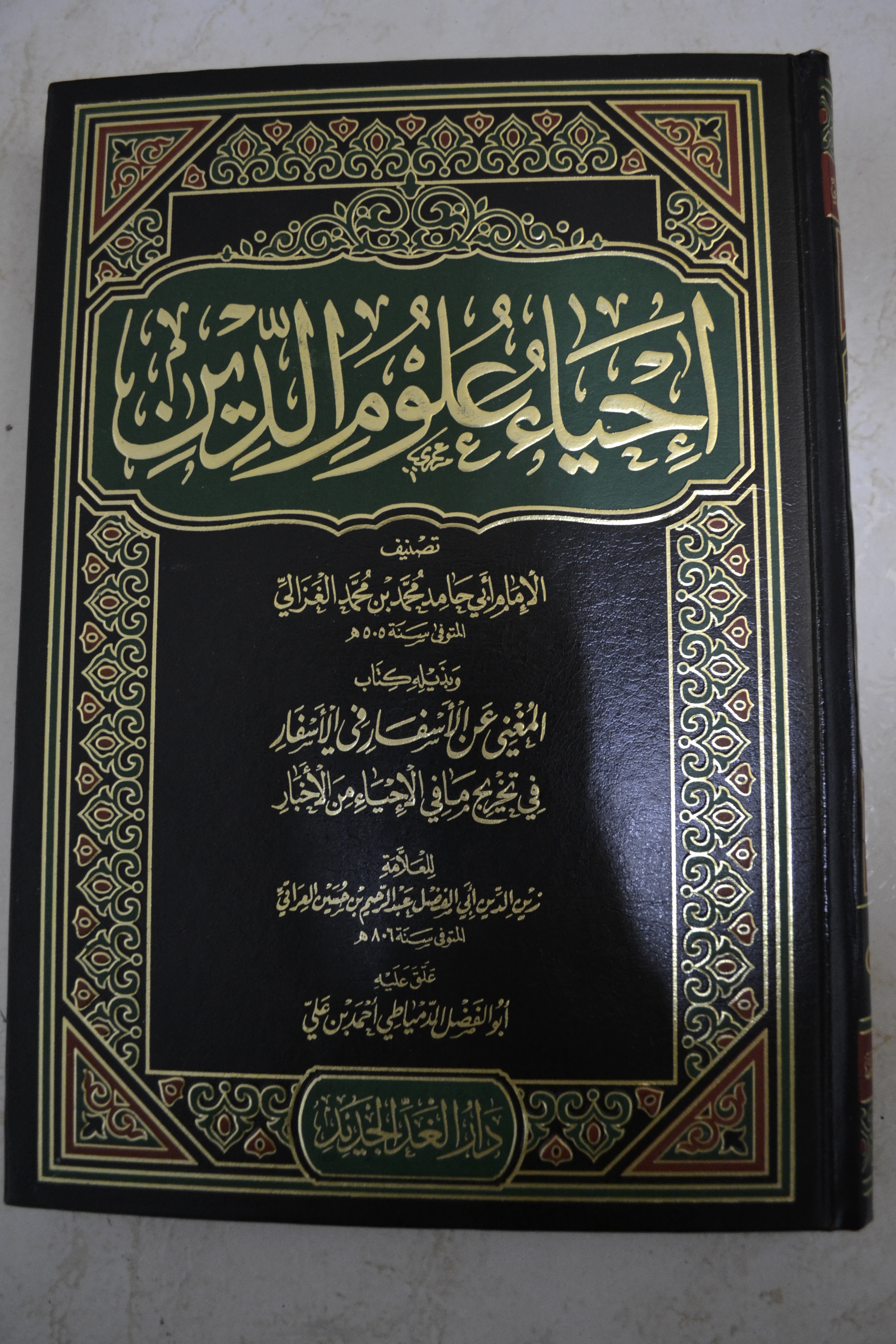
- Author: Al-Ghazali
- Original title: إِحْيَاء عُلُوم ٱلدِّين
- Language: Arabic
- Subject: Islamic ethics and philosophy
- Publication date: Early 12th century
- Publication place: Persia

The Revival of the Religious Sciences (Arabic: إِحْيَاء عُلُوم ٱلدِّين, romanized: Iḥyāʾ ʿUlūm al-Dīn) is a 12th-century book written by the Muslim scholar al-Ghazali. The book was composed in Arabic by Ghazali on his spiritual crises that stemmed from his appointment as the head of the Nizamiyya of Baghdad in Baghdad, which led to his eventual disappearance from the Muslim world for over 10 years. It is widely considered to be the most influential book in Islamic history after the Quran and canonical hadith collections.

It is regarded as one of his chief works and a classic introduction to the pious Muslim's path to God. It originally spanned 40 volumes and dealt with Islamic concepts and practices, demonstrating how these might be formed the foundation of reflective religious life, thereby attaining the higher stages of Sufism. Some consider Kimiyā-ye Sa'ādat (Alchemy of Happiness) as a rewrite of this work, which is a common misconception. Kimyā-ye Sa'ādat is shorter than this book; however, Ghazali said that he wrote the former to reflect the nature of the latter and a few of his other theological writings.

== Background ==
Ghazali was a student of al-Juwayni, under whom he studied religious sciences, including Islamic law and jurisprudence. Nizam al-Mulk, the Seljuk vizier, recognized the great potential in Ghazali as a scholar and appointed him as the head of the Nizamiyya of Baghdad. Ghazali, at the peak of his fame and scholarship went into a spiritual and intellectual crisis. He left his post at the institution on request of pilgrimage. He went on a long journey, traveling to Damascus, Jerusalem and finally to Mecca to perform the pilgrimage. Ghazali throughout the journey, was going through an inner spiritual struggle, and he became attracted towards the pathway of the Sufis. This journey influenced Ghazali to write his autobiography Deliverance from Error and then his famous book The Revival of the Religious Sciences, explaining in detail about mysticism, theology, Islamic rituals and practices.

== Structure ==
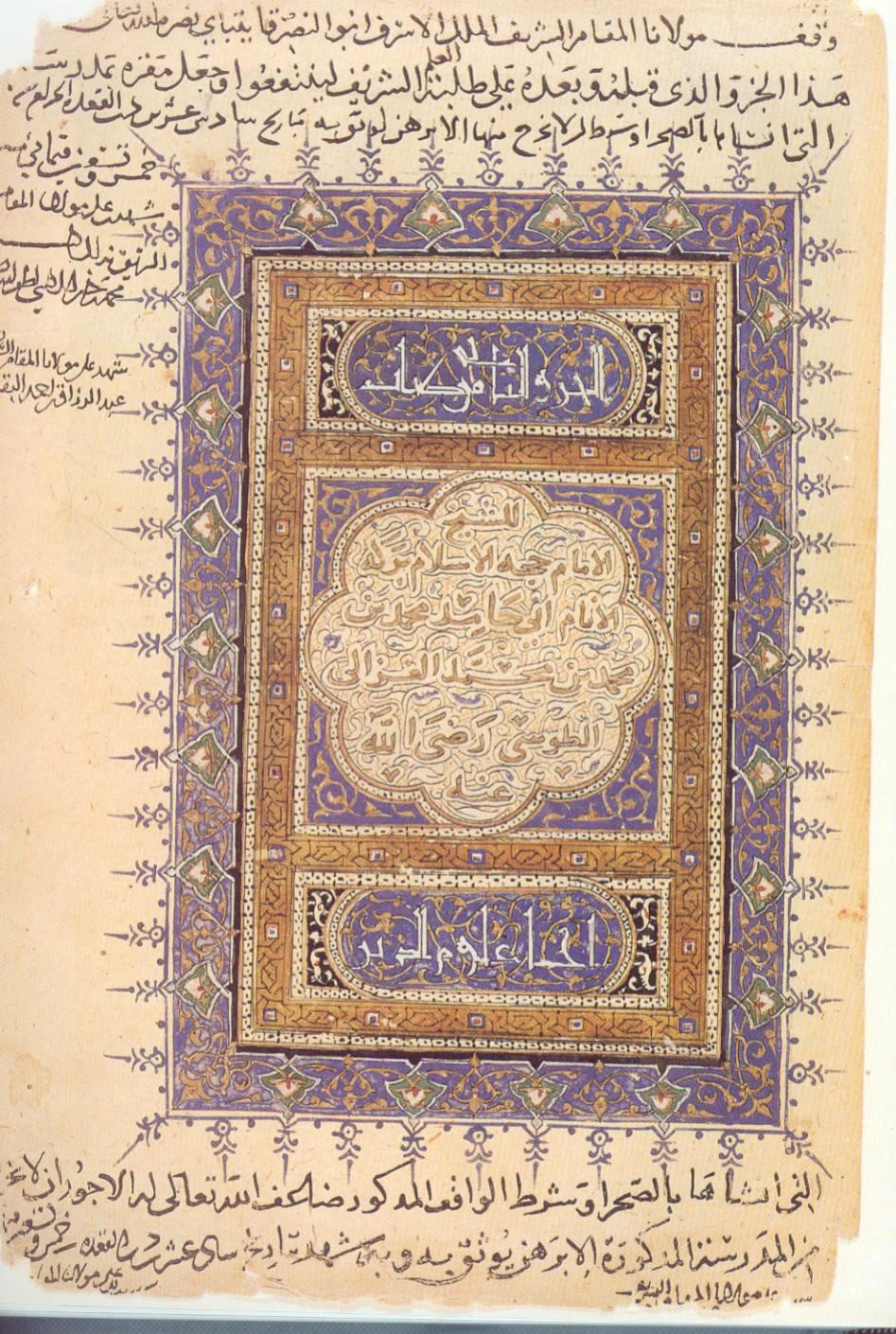
An old page with marginalia from The Revival of the Religious Sciences

The book is divided into four parts, each containing ten books. It explains the doctrines and practices of Islam and showed how these can be made the basis of a profound devotional life, leading to the higher stages of Sufism or mysticism.

First Quarter - Acts of Worship (Arabic: ربع العبادات, romanized: Rubʿ al-ʿibādāt)

This part contains the following books:

- Book 1: Book of Knowledge (Arabic: كتاب العلم, romanized: Kitāb al-ʿilm)
- Book 2: Foundations of Belief (Arabic: كتاب قواعد العقائد, romanized: Kitāb qawāʿid al-ʿaqā'id)
- Book 3: Mysteries of Purification (Arabic: كتاب أسرار الطهارة, romanized: Kitāb asrār al-ṭahārah) (In The Mysteries of Purification, the third of the forty books of the Revival of the Religious Sciences, Abu Hamid al-Ghazali explains the fundamentals of the purification that is necessary in order to perform the five daily prayers. Over the following chapters, al-Ghazali examines the lesser ablution (wudu), the greater ablution (ghusl), and the “dry ablution” (ablution without water, or tayammum). He discusses the etiquette of the bathhouse and outlines exactly how to clean the body of external things and natural growths; finally, he discusses the beard and practices related to it.)
- Book 4: Mysteries of Prayer (Arabic: كتاب أسرار الصلاة, romanized: Kitāb asrār al-ṣalāh)
- Book 5: Mysteries of Zakat (Arabic: كتاب أسرار الزكاة, romanized: Kitāb asrār al-zakāh)
- Book 6: Mysteries of Fasting (Arabic: كتاب أسرار الصوم, romanized: Kitāb asrār al-ṣawm)
- Book 7: Mysteries of Hajj (Arabic: كتاب أسرار الحج, romanized: Kitāb asrār al-ḥajj)
- Book 8: Etiquette of Qur'anic Recitation (Arabic: كتاب آداب تلاوة القرآن, romanized: Kitāb ādāb tilāwat al-qur'ān)
- Book 9: On Invocations and Supplications (Arabic: كتاب الأذكار والدعوات, romanized: Kitāb al-adhkār wa-al-daʿawāt)
- Book 10: On the Arrangements of Litanies and Divisions of the Night Vigil (Arabic: كتاب ترتيب الأوراد في الأوقات وتفصيل إحياء الليل, romanized: Kitāb tartīb al-awrād fī al-awqāt wa-tafṣīl iḥyā' al-layl)

Second Quarter - Norms of Daily Life (Arabic: ربع العادات, romanized: Rubʿ al-ʿādāt)

This part contains the following books:

- Book 11: On the Manners Related to Eating (Arabic: كتاب آداب الأكل, romanized: Kitāb ādāb al-akl)
- Book 12: On the Etiquette of Marriage (Arabic: كتاب آداب النكاح, romanized: Kitāb ādāb al-nikāḥ)
- Book 13: On the Etiquette of Acquisition and Earning a Livelihood (Arabic: كتاب آداب الكسب والمعاش, romanized: Kitāb aḥkām al-kasb wa-al-maʿāsh)
- Book 14: The Lawful and Prohibited (Arabic: كتاب الحلال والحرام, romanized: Kitāb al-ḥalāl wa-al-ḥarām)
- Book 15: On the Duties of Brotherhood (Arabic: كتاب أداب الألفة والأخوة والصحبة والمعاشرة مع أصناف الخلق, romanized: Kitāb ādāb al-ulfah wa-al-ukhuwwah wa-al-ṣuḥbah wa-al-muʿāsharah maʿa aṣnāf al-khalq)
- Book 16: On the Etiquette of Seclusion (Arabic: كتاب آداب العزلة, romanized: Kitāb al-ʿuzlah)
- Book 17: On the Etiquette of Travel (Arabic: كتاب آداب السفر, romanized: Kitāb ādāb al-safar)
- Book 18: On Music and Singing (Arabic: كتاب آداب السماع والوجد, romanized: Kitāb ādāb al-samāʿ wa-al-wajd)
- Book 19: On Enjoining Good and Forbidding Evil (Arabic: كتاب الأمر بالمعروف والنهي عن المنكر, romanized: Kitāb al-amr bi-al-maʿrūf wa-al-nahy ʿan al-munkar)
- Book 20: Etiquette of Living and the Prophetic Mannerism (Arabic: كتاب آداب المعيشة وأخلاق النبوة, romanized: Kitāb ādāb al-maʿīshah wa-akhlāq al-nubuwwah) (In the Book of Prophetic Ethics and the Courtesies of Living, book twenty of the forty books which compose the Revival of the Religious Sciences, Abu Hamid al-Ghazali gives an account of the customs and character of Muhammad.)

Third Quarter - The Ways to Perdition (Arabic: ربع المهلكات, romanized: Rubʿ al-muhlikāt)

This part contains the following books:

- Book 21: The Marvels of the Heart (Arabic: كتاب شرح عجائب القلب, romanized: Kitāb sharḥ ʿajā'ib al-qalb)
- Book 22: On Disciplining the Soul (Arabic: كتاب رياضة النفس, romanized: Kitāb riyāḍat al-nafs)
- Book 23: On Breaking the Two Desires (Arabic: كتاب كسر الشهوتين, romanized: Kitāb kasr al-shahwatayn)
- Book 24: Defects of the Tongue (Arabic: كتاب آفات اللسان, romanized: Kitāb āfāt al-lisān)
- Book 25: Condemnation of Rancor and Envy (Arabic: كتاب ذم الغضب والحقد والحسد, romanized: Kitāb āfāt al-ghaḍab wa-al-ḥiqd wa-al-ḥasad)
- Book 26: Condemnation of the World (Arabic: كتاب ذم الدنيا, romanized: Kitāb dhamm al-dunyā)
- Book 27: Condemnation of Miserliness and Condemnation of the Love of Wealth (Arabic: كتاب ذم البخل وذم حب المال, romanized: Kitāb dhamm al-bukhl wa-dhamm ḥubb al-māl)
- Book 28: Condemnation of Status and Ostentation (Arabic: كتاب ذم الجاه والرياء, romanized: Kitāb dhamm al-jāh wa-al-riyā')
- Book 29: Condemnation of Pride and Conceit (Arabic: كتاب ذم الكبر والعجب, romanized: Kitāb dhamm al-kibr wa-al-ʿujb)
- Book 30: Condemnation of Self-Delusion (Arabic: كتاب ذم الغرور, romanized: Kitāb dhamm al-ghurūr)

Fourth Quarter - The Ways to Salvation (Arabic: ربع المنجيات, romanized: Rubʿ al-munjiyāt)

This part contains the following books:

- Book 31: On Repentance (Arabic: كتاب التوبة, romanized: Kitāb al-tawbah)
- Book 32: On Patience and Thankfulness (Arabic: كتاب الصبر والشكر, romanized: Kitāb al-ṣabr wa-al-shukr)
- Book 33: On Fear and Hope (Arabic: كتاب الخوف والرجاء, romanized: Kitāb al-khawf wa-al-rajā')
- Book 34: On Poverty and Abstinence (Arabic: كتاب الفقر والزهد, romanized: Kitāb al-faqr wa-al-zuhd)
- Book 35: Faith in Divine Unity and Trust in Divine Providence (Arabic: كتاب التوحيد والتوكل, romanized: Kitāb al-tawḥīd wa-al-tawakkul) (In an axial volume from his celebrated compendium, al-Ghazali shares his startling and original exploration of the meaning of trust in Divine Providence and recommends specific spiritual skills to help the seeker develop a state whereby he or she may rightly respond to events as they happen. This judicious use of stories is intended to imitate the Sufi practice of the master/disciple relationship, where the novice is helped to discern correct action.)
- Book 36: On Love, Longing, Intimacy and Contentment (Arabic: كتاب المحبة والشوق والأنس والرضا, romanized: Kitāb al-maḥabbah wa-al-shawq wa-al-uns wa-al-riḍā)
- Book 37: On Intention, Sincerity, and Truth (Arabic: كتاب النية والإخلاص والصدق, romanized: Kitāb al-niyyah wa-al-ṣidq wa-al-ikhlāṣ)
- Book 38: On Holding Vigil and Self-Examination (Arabic: كتاب المراقبة والمحاسبة, romanized: Kitāb al-murāqabah wa-al-muḥāsabah) (The 38th chapter of the Revival of the Religious Sciences, this treatise follows on from Al-Ghazali on Intention, Sincerity & Truthfulness. Here, Ghazali focuses on the different stations of steadfastness in religion, vigilance and self-examination being its cornerstones. As in all his writings, Ghazali bases his arguments on the Qur’an, the example of the Prophet, and the sayings of numerous scholars and Sufis. As relevant today as it was in the 11th century, this discourse will be of interest to anyone concerned with ethics and moral philosophy.)
- Book 39: On Meditation (Arabic: كتاب التفكر, romanized: Kitāb al-tafakkur)
- Book 40: On the Remembrance of Death and the Afterlife (Arabic: كتاب ذكر الموت وما بعده, romanized: Kitāb dhikr al-mawt wa-mā baʿdahu)

== Influence ==
Seyyed Hossein Nasr states that it is "perhaps the most influential work on ethics in Islamic history". It became the most frequently read Islamic book after the Quran and the hadith. Its great accomplishment was to bring orthodox Sunni theology and Sufi mysticism together in a useful, comprehensible manner to guide every aspect of Muslim life and death.

== Reception ==
The Ihya Ulum al-Din is considered to be one of the most widely read books in Islam across the world, having gained reverence from scholars and the general acceptance of the Muslim people (ummah). Here are few statements regarding the book from the most revered and renowned scholars:

Al-Nawawi stated that: "Were the books of Islam all to be lost, excepting only the Ihya, it would suffice to replace them all."

Ibn al-Subki said regarding it: "It (Ihya) ranks among the books which Muslims look after (preserve) and spread far and wide so that many people may be guided reading it. Hardly has someone looked into this book, except he woke up on the spot (came to Guidance) thanks to it. May Allah grant us insight that shows us the way of the Truth (Haqq), and protect us from what (darkness) stands between us and the Truth as a veil."

Al-Safadi said: "It is among the noble and greatest books, to the extent that it was said concerning it - that if all the books of Islam were lost, except the 'Ihya' (of Al-Ghazali), it would suffice (be enough) for what was lost."

Fakhr al-Din al-Razi said: "It (Ihya) was as if Allah (God) gathered all the Sciences (subjects) under a dome and showed them to Al-Ghazali."

== Minhaj al-Qasidin ==
Al-Ghazali, despite being a scholar, was not an expert in the field of hadith and thus the hadith narrations contained in his book were scrutinized. Hadith experts like Ibn al-Jawzi and Najm al-din Ibn Qudamah researched and sorted out the hadith narrations contained in the book on the basis of their authenticities. They then wrote the Minhaj-al-Qasidin and its overview called Mukhtasar. The book was then carefully reworked by Ibn al Jawzi (597 AH) and the result of his work was named Minhaj al-Qāsidīn wa Mufīd al-Shādiqīn. Ibn al-Jawzi's efforts in rewriting the book is considered important and while he had similarities with Al-Ghazali in terms of mastery in mysticism, he also had the superiority of expertise in the knowledge of the hadiths. The reworking by Ibn al-Jawzi focused on the re-examination of the existing hadiths, elimination of weak and disputed hadiths and their replacement with the authentic and sound ones so that the integrity of the book was not compromised. Minhaj al-Qasidin was a fairly thick book and it was summarized in the form of Mukhtasar by Imam Ibn Qudamah. Whenever Ibn al Jawzi focused on the study of hadith, he found the Mukhtasar book in line with its name, aiming at summarizing and making the essence of the previous book to be more concise, organized, and easy to understand. It also added additional notes so that it may become an easy book for students to read. Ibn Qudamah remarked that whenever he read Ibn al Jawzi's Minhajul Qasidin, he felt that this book was very useful for society, so he would read it again in order to absorb the deeper meaning for the second time. He said that his admiration for the book grew such that he also added some important missing topics that were readily available in other prominent books of his time with additional notes such as hadith and commentary.

== See also ==
- Alchemy of Happiness
- Aims of the Philosophers
- Incoherence of the Philosophers
- Al-Ghazali (book)
