= Kitab al-Umm =

Book by Mohammed Al-Shafi'i

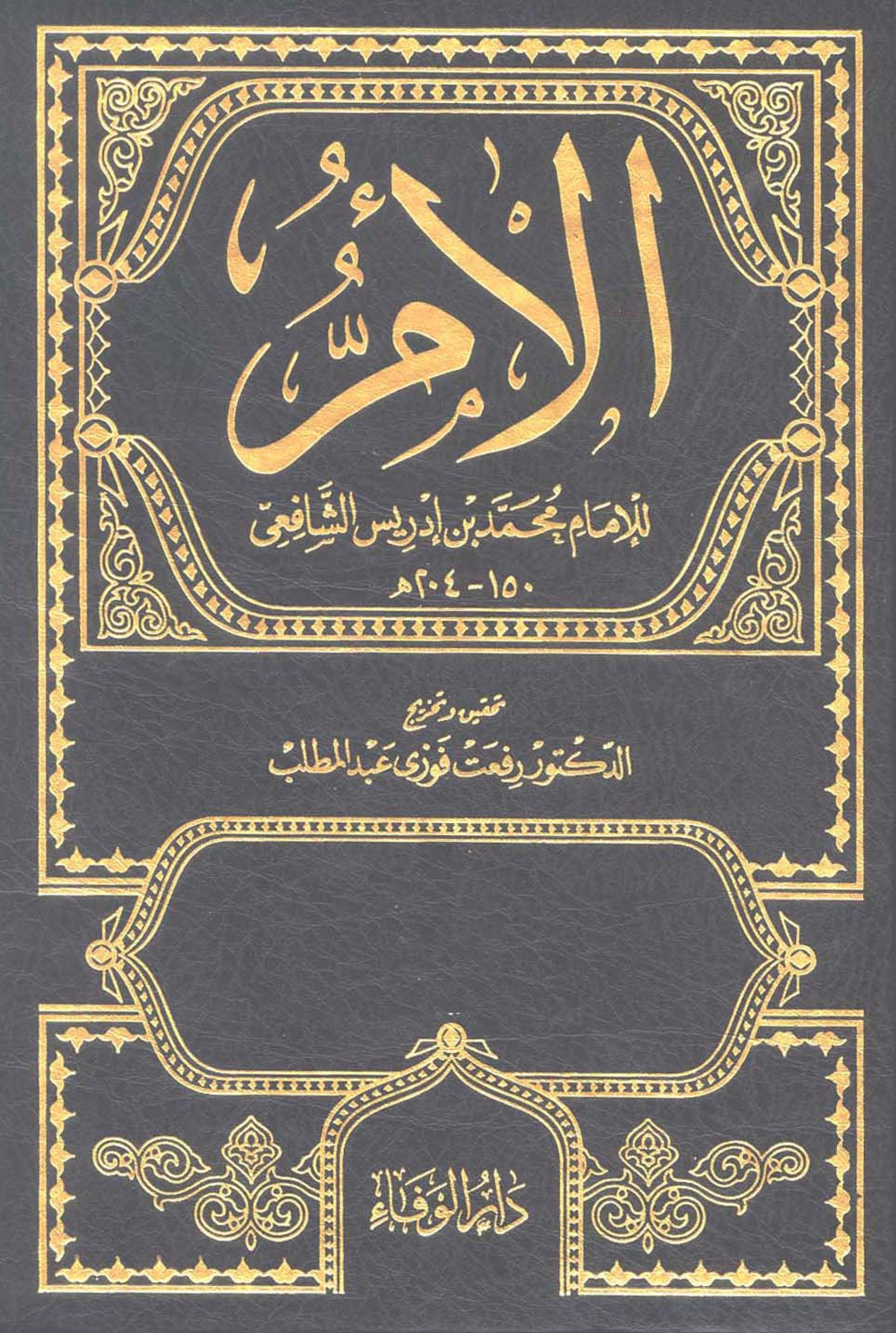
Cover

The Kitāb al-Umm (Arabic: كـتـاب الأم) is the first exhaustive compendium of Islamic code of law that is used as an authoritative guide by the Shafi'i school of fiqh (Islamic jurisprudence) within the Sunni branch of Islam. The work was composed by the founder of the Shafi'i school, Imām ash-Shāfi‘ī (767–820 CE). The term "al-Umm" means "the exemplar." The Kitab al-Umm is noted for its hermeneutic approach to developing legal principles, basing them on revelation rather than traditional authority.
