= Al-Juwayni =

Muslim scholar and theologian (1028–1085)

al-Juwayni
- الجويني
- Title: Imam al-Haramayn; Sheikh ul-Islam; Ḍiyā' al-Dīn

Personal life
- Born: 17 February 1028 Boštanekān, Jowayin County, near Nishapur, Greater Khorasan, Persia, now Razavi Khorasan province, Iran
- Died: 20 August 1085 (aged 57)
- Era: Islamic Golden Age
- Region: Persia, Hejaz, Iraq
- Main interest(s): Islamic theology (kalam), Islamic jurisprudence, Principles of Islamic jurisprudence
- Notable idea(s): Al-Irshad; Al-Burhan; Nihayat al-Matlab fi Dirayat al-Madhhab
- Occupation: Islamic Scholar, Muslim Jurist, Theologian

Religious life
- Religion: Islam
- Denomination: Sunni Islam
- Jurisprudence: Shafi'i
- Creed: Ash'ari

Muslim leader
- Influenced by: Al-Shafi'i Al-Muzani Abu al-Hasan al-Ash'ari Abu Muhammad al-Juwayni Al-Bayhaqi
- Influenced: Abu Hamid al-Ghazali Al-Kiya al-Harrasi Abu al-Qasim al-Ansari Abd al-Ghafir al-Farsi Abu al-Hasan al-Tabari

Dhia' ul-Dīn 'Abd al-Malik ibn Yūsuf al-Juwaynī al-Shafi'ī (Arabic إمام الحرمين ضياء الدين عبدالملك بن يوسف الجويني, 17 February 1028 – 20 August 1085; 419–478 AH) was a Sunni Muslim scholar famous for being the foremost leading jurisconsult, legal theoretician and Islamic theologian of his time. His name is commonly abbreviated as al-Juwayni; he is also commonly referred to as Imam al-Haramayn meaning "leading master of the two holy cities", that is, Mecca and Medina. He acquired the status of a mujtahid in the field of fiqh and usul al-fiqh. Highly celebrated as one of the most important and influential thinkers in the Shafi'i school of orthodox Sunni jurisprudence, he was considered as the virtual second founder of the Shafi'i school, after its first founder Imam al-Shafi'i. He was also considered a major figurehead within the Ash'ari school of theology where he was ranked equal to the founder, Imam al-Ash'ari. He was given the honorific titles of Shaykh of Islam, The Glory of Islam, The Absolute Imam of all Imams.

== Early life ==
Al-Juwayni was born on 17 February 1028 in a village on the outskirts of Naysabur called Bushtaniqan in Iran, Al-Juwayni was a prominent Muslim scholar known for his gifted intellect in Islamic legal matters. Al-Juwayni although an Iranian scholar, was born into a family of legal study which was of Arab origin, descending from the Arab tribe of Sinbis. His father, Abu Muhammad al-Juwayni, was a well-known master of law in the Shafi′i community as well as a Shafi'i teacher and his older brother, Abu'l-Hasan 'Ali al-Juwayni, was a Sufi teacher of Hadith.

=== Education ===
Al-Juwayni grew up in Naysabur, an intellectually thriving area drawing scholars to it. Early on, al-Haramayn studied a variety of fundamental religious subjects under his father, Abu Muhammad al-Juwayni. These subjects included the Arabic grammar and its eloquence (balagha), the Quran, the hadith, the fiqh (Islamic law), khilaf (the art of disagreements), and principles of Islamic jurisprudence. He even read and studied all of his father's books, including Sharh al-Muzani, Sharh usul al-Shafi'i, Mukhtasar al-Mukhtasar, al-Tafsir al-Kabir, and al-Tabsirah. He had a solid foundation in Shafi'i law. His father was a well-known Shafi'i scholar, so al-Haramayn had a strong intellectual lineage, and he was well-established in Shafi'i circles in Nishapur because of two factors: his thorough understanding of the Shafi'i legal tradition, to the point where he could offer his ijtihad, and his assumption of his father's role as a house tutor following his death in 439/1047.

=== Teachers ===
In addition to his father's studies, al-Juwayni studied under Abu al-Qasim al-Isfarayini (d. 452 AH), the son of Abu Ishaq al-Isfarayini, who taught him Islamic theology and legal theory. Abu Bakr al-Bayhaqi (d. 458/1056) taught him hadith. Further Arabic grammatical instruction was received by Imam al-Haramayn from Abu'l-Hassan 'Ali b. Fadl b. 'Ali al-Majashi, while Abu 'Abdullah al-Khabbazi (d. 449 AH) provided Quranic exegesis. Regarding the study of hadith and its dissemination, Imam al-Haramayn acquired knowledge from various sources. He received hadith transmission from scholars like Abu Nu'aym al-Isfahani, Abu Bakr Ahmad b. Muhammad al-Tamimi, Abu Sa'd 'Abd al-Rahman b. Hamdan al-Nadrawi, Abu Hassan Muhammad b. Ahmad al-Muzakki, Abu Abdullah Muhammad b. Ibrahim al-Tarrazi, and Abu Muhammad al-Jawharri in addition to learning from his father and al-Bayhaqi. Al-Juwayni also studied Sunan al-Daraqutni with Abu Sa'd, which he relies upon frequently throughout his later works. Following his acquisition of a firm foundation in the fundamental disciplines of Islamic studies, Imam al-Haramayn began to broaden his horizons intellectually in order to forge greater religious credentials within the Ash'ari theological school and Shafi'i legal school. In addition to learning fiqh and usul al-fiqh from his father, Imam al-Haramayn received some legal instruction from the leaders of the Shafi'is in Marw, including the Shaykh of the Shafi'is in Khurasan al-Qadi Abu 'Ali Husayn b. Muhammad b. Ahmad al-Marw al-Rudhi (d.462 AH), and al-Qasim al-Furani. After that, he visited Isfahan, Baghdad, and Hejaz, where he met academics. He made use of the chance to learn both fiqh and usul al-fiqh. In addition to acquiring expertise in the legal sciences, Imam al-Haramayn founded a robust intellectual and pedagogical legacy within the Shafi'i legal tradition.

== Fleeing and coming back ==
Al-Juwayni was left to flee Nishapur by force when the Karramite governor Al-Kundduri passed a verdict to curse Abu al-Hasan al-Ash'ari during the weekly Friday prayer gatherings and to imprison any of his adherents. Among those that were forced to secretly flee were Abu Sahl al-Bastami, Al-Furati, Al-Qushayri, and Al-Bayhaqi and many other scholars of the Shafi'is.

As a result, Al-Juwayni fled to Mecca and Medina in search of a new home. He taught knowledge and wrote books in Hijaz for four years. His scholarship was so widely acclaimed amongst the scholars of the Hejaz that he acquired the title of Imam al Haramayn meaning "leading master of the two holy cities". He gained a large following and was invited back to Nishapur as an undisputed grand mufti once Nizam Al Mulk took power, and was appointed the headmaster of newly built prestigious Nizamiyya school where he stayed for the next 30 years, training and preparing for the next generation of Shafi'i jurists and Ash'ari theologians. Al-Juwayni spent his life studying and producing influential treatises in Muslim government; it is suspected that most of his works (below) came out of this period after his return from Mecca and Medina.

== Students ==
Al-Juwayni had over 400 students; his most famous students became world famous scholars of their time and they include:

- Abu Hamid al-Ghazali
- Al-Kiya al-Harrasi
- Abu al-Qasim al-Ansari
- Abd al-Ghafir al-Farsi
- Abu al-Hasan al-Tabari
- Abu al-Hasan al-Bakhirzi
- Ibn al-Qushayri (son of Al-Qushayri)

Al-Ghazali was the foremost pupil of Al-Juwayni and who became one of the most influential scholars in the Islamic history. Following are some of the famous remarks of al-Juwayni towards al-Ghazali:

Al-Ghazali is a quenching sea in which you can drown in.

You buried me while I am still alive. Can't you wait until I'm dead? (By this al-Juwayni meant, your books outshine me)

== Death ==
He died of liver disease and was buried at his home after a huge crowd attended his funeral. Unrestrained demonstration of sorrow by four hundred of his over-zealous students lasted for days in Khurasan. Ibn Asakir said: "I believe that the marks of his hard work and striving in Allah's religion shall endure until the rising of the Hour."

== Doctrine ==
Al-Juwayni, a Sunni jurist and Mutakallim, or scholar engaged in the study of theological principles, spent his life deciphering between what a Muslim ought and ought not to do. He was said to be stubborn and unaccepting of any legal speculation whatsoever. His basic principle was that the law should not be left to speculation on any grounds. Rather, texts hold the answers to any possible legal debate in some capacity or another.

== Reception ==
Ibn Asakir said: "the Glory of Islam, absolute Imam of all imams, main authority in the Law, whose leadership is agreed upon East and West, whose immense merit is the consensus of Arabs and non-Arabs, upon the like of whom none set eyes before or after." Al-Kawthari said: "whose work forms the connecting link between the respective methods of the Salaf and Khalaf."

Al-Bakhirzi made a comparison of Al-Juwayni's to Al-Shafi'i and Al-Muzani in jurisprudence, Al-Asmaʿi in manners, Al-Hasan al-Basri in preaching eloquence, and Al-Ash'ari in speculative theology. Ibn Asakir replied and said: "Truly he is above that by far." Ibn al-Subki said: "Whoever thinks that there is anyone in the Four Schools that comes near his clarity of speech has no knowledge of him."

== Works ==
His well-known works:

=== Kalam ===
- Al-Irshad, is a major classic of Islamic theology.
- Al-Shamil fi Usul al-Din (Summa on the Principles of Religion)
- Al-'Aqida al-Nizamiyya (The Nizami Creed)
- Luma' al-Adilla fi Qawa'id 'Aqā'id Ahl al-Sunna (Flashes of Proof Concerning the Principles of the Doctrines of the People of the Sunna)

=== Fiqh ===
- Nihayat al-Matlab fi Dirayat al-Madhhab نهاية المطلب في دراية المذهب (نهاية المطلب في دراية المذهب, "The End of the Quest in the Knowledge of the [Shafi'i] School"), his magnum opus, which Ibn 'Asakir said had no precedent in Islam.
- Ghiyath al-Umam (غياث الأمم)
- Mughith al-Khalq (مغيث الخلق)
- Mukhtasar al-Nihaya

=== Usul al-Fiqh ===
- Al-Talkhis fi Usul al-Fiqh, an abridgement of Abu Bakr al-Baqillani's (d.403/1013) al-Taqrib wa'l-Irshad written very early on into al-Juwayni's intellectual career.
- Al-Burhan, considered as one of the four main books in this science.
- Al-Waraqat

The book Fara'id al-Simtayn is sometimes mistakenly thought to be authored by the Sunni Abd'al Malik al-Juwayni. It was in fact authored by another Sunni scholar, Ibrahim bin Muhammad bin Himaway al Juwaynim who died in 1322 (722 A.H.)

== See also ==
- List of Ash'aris
- List of Muslim theologians
