= List of hadith books =

The following is a list of hadith collections compiled by traditionists, which are the purported words, actions, and the silent approvals of the Islamic prophet Muhammad or his immediate circle (companions in Sunni Islam, Ahl al-Bayt in Shiite Islam). Among secondary compilations, a notable work is Al-Jāmiʿ al-Kāmil fī al-Ḥadīth al-Ṣaḥīḥ al-Shāmil, compiled by Ziya-ur-Rahman Azmi, which gathers over 16,000 authentic prophetic narrations from more than 200 sources—claiming to include all known sahih (authentic) hadith in a single volume.

== Sunni collections ==
- The Nine Hadith books that are indexed in the world renowned Hadith concordance (Al-Mu’jamul Mufahras li Alfadhil Hadithin Nabawi) .

1. Sahih al-Bukhari (9th century)
2. Sahih Muslim (9th century)
3. Sunan Abu Dawood (9th century)
4. Sunan al-Tirmidhi (9th century)
5. Sunan al-Nasa'i (9-10th century)
6. Sunan ibn Majah (9th century)
7. Muwatta Imam Malik (8th century)
8. Sunan al-Darimi (9th century)
9. Musnad Ahmad bin Hanbal (9th century)

- Other Primary/Major Collections (Primary Hadith books are those books which are collected and written by author or their students themselves). Most of the following list has been given in Preface (Muqadamah) of the book Al-Jami al-Kamil (published in 2019) by Ziya-ur-Rahman Azmi, but the 1st century AH collections are not readily accessible:

1. Majmoah Saʽd ibn ʽUbadah (d. 16 AH)
2. Majmoah Abd Allah ibn Mas'ud (d. 32 AH)
3. Nuskha lil Imam Ali (d. 40 AH)
4. Maktobat lil Amr ibn Hazm (d. 51 AH)
5. Risaalah Samura ibn Jundab (d. 54 AH)
6. Sahifah al-Sadiqah lil Abd Allah ibn Amr ibn al-As (d. 65 AH)
7. Sahifah Jabir ibn Abd Allah (d. 74 AH)
8. Majmoah Bashir Ibn Nahik (d. 91 AH)
9. Sahifah Anas ibn Malik (d. 93 AH)
10. Riwayaat ul Aisha lil Urwa ibn al-Zubayr (d. 94 AH)
11. Riwayaat ul Ibn Abbas from Sa'id ibn Jubayr (d. 96 AH)
12. Sahifah Hammam ibn Munabbih (d. 130 A.H.)
13. Kitab al-Maghazi by Musa ibn ʿUqba (d. 141 A.H.)
14. Musnad Abu Hanifa (d. 150 AH)
15. Musannaf ibn Jurayj (d. 150 AH)
16. Al-Jami lil Ma'mar ibn Rashid (d. 154 AH)
17. Al-Jami Abd al-Rahman al-Awza'i (d. 158 AH)
18. Al-Jami lil Imam Sufyan Suri (d. 161 AH)
19. Muwatta Imam Malik (d. 179 AH)
20. Kitab al-Zuhd wa al-Raqaiq by Abd Allah ibn al-Mubarak (181 AH)
21. Kitab al-Kharaj by Abu Yusuf (d. 182 AH)
22. Kitab-ul-Aathaar - al Shaybani (d. 189 AH)
23. Al-Muwattah lil Muhammad al-Shaybani (d. 189 AH)
24. Kitab ul Zuhd lil Waki' ibn al-Jarrah (d. 197 AH)
25. Al-Jami Ibn Wahb al-Masri (d. 197 AH)
26. Al-Kharaj lil Yahya bin Adam (d. 203 AH)
27. Kitab al-Umm (d. 204 AH)
28. Musnad al-Shafi'i (d. 204 AH)
29. Al-Risala (d. 204 AH)
30. Musnad al Tayalisi (d. 204 AH)
31. Al-Mughazi lil imam Al-Waqidi (d. 207 AH)
32. Musannaf of Abd al-Razzaq (d. 211 AH)
33. Musnad Humaidi Imam Al-Humaydi (d. 219 AH)
34. Fazail e Qur'an lil Abu Ubaid al-Qasim bin Salam (d. 224 AH)
35. Al-Amwaal lil Abu Ubaid al-Qasim bin Salam (d. 224 AH)
36. Al-Tahur lil Abu Ubaid al-Qasim bin Salam (d. 224 AH)
37. Gharib Hadith lil Abu Ubaid al-Qasim bin Salam(d. 224 AH)
38. Sunan Sa'id ibn Mansur (d. 227 AH)
39. Musnad Musadad bin Masarhad (d. 228 AH))
40. Musnad Abd al-Rahman bin Awf lil Imam Ahmad bin Muhammad al-Barti (d. 228 AH)
41. Musnad Ibn al-Ja'd (230 AH)
42. Kitab Al-ilm lil Abi Khaytmah Zuhair bin Harb (d. 234 AH)
43. Musannaf Ibn Abi Shaybah (d. 235 AH)
44. Al-Musnad lil Ibn Abi Shaybah (d. 235 AH)
45. Musnad Ishaq Ibn Rahwayh (d. 238 AH)
46. Musnad Ahmad ibn Hanbal (d. 241 AH)
47. Kitab Al-Zuhd lil Ahmad ibn Hanbal (d. 241 AH)
48. Fazail e Sahaba lil Ahmad ibn Hanbal (d. 241 AH)
49. Al-Ashrabah lil Ahmad ibn Hanbal (d. 241 AH)
50. Al-Zuhd lil ibn Al-Sari (d. 243 AH)
51. Musnad Ibn Abi Umar al-Adni (d. 243 AH)
52. Musnad Ahmad bin Muni (d. 244 AH)
53. Al-Amwal lil ibn Zanjuyah (d. 248 AH)
54. Al-Munthakhab min Musnad Abd bin Hameed (d. 249 AH)
55. Sunan ad-Darimi (d. 255 AH)
56. Sahih al-Bukhari (d. 256 AH)
57. Al-Adab al-Mufrad (d. 256 AH)
58. Al-Tarikh al-Kabir (d. 256 AH)
59. Juz Qira Khalaf al-Imam (d. 256 AH)
60. Juz Rifa al-Ideen lil imam Muhammad al-Bukhari (d. 256 AH)
61. Khalqul Afwal ul Ibad lil imam Muhammad al-Bukhari (d. 256 AH)
62. Sahih Muslim (d. 261 AH)
63. Sunan ibn Majah (d. 273 AH)
64. Musnad Abdullah bin Umar lil Imam Muhammad bin Ibrahim Tarsusi (d. 273 AH)
65. Sunan Abu Dawood (d. 275 AH)
66. Al-Murasil lil imam Muhammad al-Bukhari (d. 256 AH)
67. Musnad lil Imam Baqi bin Mukhlid al-Andalusi (d. 276 AH)
68. Al-Marefa wal Tarikh lil Imam al-Faswi (d. 277 AH).
69. Shamail Muhammadiah lil Imam Muhammad al-Bukhari (d. 256 AH)
70. Al-ilal lil Imam Muhammad al-Bukhari (d. 256 AH)
71. Sunan al-Tirmidhi (d. 279 AH)
72. Shamaail Tirmidhi (Shama'il Muhammadiyah (d. 279 AH)
73. Makarim al-Akhlaq lil Ibn Abi al-Dunya (d. 281 AH)
74. Musnad al-Harith (d. 282 AH)
75. Gharib Hadith lil ibn Ishaq al-Harbi (d. 285 AH)
76. Kitabul Sunnah lil Ibn Abi Asim (d. 287 AH)
77. Al-Ahaad wal Al-Muthani lil Ibn Abi Asim (d. 287 AH)
78. Al-Jihad lil Ibn Abi Asim (d. 287 AH)
79. Al-Diyat lil Ibn Abi Asim (d. 287 AH)
80. Al-Zuhd lil Ibn Abi Asim (d. 287 AH)
81. Musnad al-Bazzar (d. 292 AH)
82. Sunnah lil Muhammad Bin Nasr Al Maruzi (d. 294 AH)
83. Tazeem Qadr al-Salaat lil Muhammad Bin Nasr Al Maruzi (d. 294 AH)
84. Qiyaam al-Layl lil Muhammad Bin Nasr Al Maruzi (d. 294 AH)
85. Fazail e Qur'an lil Ibn Al-Dharis (d. 294 AH)
86. Sunan al-Nasa'i (d. 303 AH)
87. Sunan al-Kubra lil Nasa'i (d. 303 AH)
88. Khasais of Amir Al Momenin (d. 303 AH)
89. Amal ul Yomul Laila lil Imam Nasa'i (d. 303 AH)
90. Musnad Abu Ya'la (d. 307 AH)
91. Kitab Al-Muntaqi lil ibn Al-Jarod (d. 307 AH)
92. Musnad al-Rowayani (d. 307 AH)
93. Tahdhib al-Athar lil al-Tabari (d. 310 AH)
94. Al-Kani wal Asma lil Imam Dulaabi (d. 310 A.H.)
95. Sahih Ibn Khuzaymah (d. 311 AH)
96. Al-Tawhid lil Imam Nasa'i (d. 303 AH)
97. Al-ilal lil Abu Bakr al-Khallal (d. 311 AH)
98. Musnad al-Siraj (d. 313 AH)
99. Musnad Abu Awaanah (d. 316 AH)
100. Al-Masahif lil Ibn Abi Dawud (d. 316 AH)
101. Al-Awsat lil imam Ibn al-Mundhir (d. 321 AH)
102. Sharh Mushkil al-Athar (d. 321 AH).
103. Sharh Ma'ani al-Athar (d. 321 AH).
104. Al-Zuafa lil Imam Al-Uqaili (d. 322 AH)
105. Al-ilal lil Imam ibne Abi Hatim (d. 327 AH)
106. Al-Marasil lil imam ibne Abi Hatim (d. 327 AH)
107. Makaram al-Akhlaq lil al-Kharati (d. 327 AH)
108. Masawi al-Akhlaq lil al-Kharati (d. 327 AH)
109. Musnad al-Haytham bin Kalib al-Shashi (d. 335 AH)
110. Al Mujam us Sahaba lil ibn Qanee (d. 351 AH)
111. Sahih Ibn Hibban (d. 354 AH)
112. Al-Fawadi (Al-Ghilaniyat) lil Abi Bakr Muhammad bin Abdullah bin Ibrahim al-Shafi’i (354 AH)
113. Al-Mu'jam al-Kabir (d. 360 AH)
114. Al-Mu'jam al-Awsat (d. 360 AH)
115. Al-Mu'jam as-Saghir (d. 360 AH)
116. Al-Mu'ajm Al-Shamayin lil Al-Tabarani (d. 360 AH)
117. Al-Dua lil Al-Tabarani (d. 360 AH)
118. Al-Shariah lil Al-Tabarani (d. 360 AH)
119. Amal Youm ul Laila lil Ibn Al-Sunni (d. 364 AH)
120. Al-Kamil fi Zuafa al-rijal lil Imam Ibn Adi (d. 365 AH)
121. Al-Azmah lil Abu Shaykh al-Asbahani (d. 369 AH)
122. Akhlaq un Nabih lil Abu Shaykh al-Asbahani (d. 369 AH)
123. Sunan al-Daraqutni (d. 385 AH)
124. Al-Nuzul lil Imam Al-Daraqutni (d. 385 AH)
125. Al-ilal lil Imam Al-Daraqutni (d. 385 AH)
126. Al-ilzamat lil Imam Al-Daraqutni (d. 385 AH)
127. Al-Tattabay lil Imam Al-Daraqutni (d. 385 AH)
128. Al-Turgheeb fi Fazayl al-Amaal lil Imam Al-Daraqutni (385 AH)
129. Al-Ibanah lil Imam Ibn Battah (d. 387 AH)
130. Ghareeb al-Hadith lil Imam Al-Khattabi (d. 388 AH)
131. Al-iman lil Imam Ibn Manda (d. 395 AH)
132. Marifat us Sahaba lil Imam Ibn Manda (d. 395 AH)
133. Al-Mustadrak ala al-Sahihayn by Imam Al-Hakim al-Nishapuri (d. 405 AH)
134. Al-Fawaid lil Imam Muhammad bin Tammam al-Razi (d. 414 AH)
135. Sharah Usul ul iteqad lil Imam Lal al-Ka'i (d. 418 AH)
136. Hilyat al-Awliya lil Abu Nu'aym al-Isfahani (d. 430 AH)
137. Marifat us Sahaba lil Abu Nu'aym al-Isfahani (d. 430 AH)
138. Akhbar al-Isbahan lil Abu Nu'aym al-Isfahani (d. 430 AH)
139. Dalail al-Nubuwwa by Abu Nu'aym al-Isfahani (d. 430 AH)
140. Amali lil Ibn Bushran (d. 430 AH)
141. Al-Ibanah un Usul ul Diyanah lil Imam Sajzi (d. 444 AH)
142. Fazail al-Sham lil Abi al-Hasan Ali ibn Muhammad al-Rabi (d. 444 AH)
143. Musnad al-Shahab lil Imam Al-Qadhai (d. 454 AH)
144. Al-Muhalla (d. 456 AH)
145. Hajjatul Wida lil Imam Ibn Hazm(d. 456 AH)
146. Sunan al-Kubra lil Al-Bayhaqi (d. 458 AH)
147. Al-Sunan al-Sughra lil Al-Bayhaqi (d. 458 AH)
148. Al-Sunan al-Wusta lil Imam Al-Bayhaqi (d. 458 AH)
149. Dalail al-Nubuwwa by Al-Bayhaqi (d. 458 AH)
150. Shu'ab al-Iman lil Imam Al-Bayhaqi (d. 458 AH)
151. Al-Baathe wan Nushur lil Imam Al-Bayhaqi (d. 458 AH)
152. Al-Dawaat al-Kabir lil Imam Al-Bayhaqi (d. 458 AH)
153. Al-Qadr lil Imam Al-Bayhaqi (d. 458 AH)
154. Al-Khilafiyat lil Imam Al-Bayhaqi (d. 458 AH)
155. Azabul Qabr lil Imam Al-Bayhaqi (d. 458 AH)
156. Al-Mudkhal al-Sunan al-Kubra lil Imam Al-Bayhaqi (d. 458 AH)
157. Al-Ithiqad lil Imam Al-Bayhaqi (d. 458 AH)
158. Al-Adaab lil Imam Al-Bayhaqi (d. 458 AH)
159. Hayat ul Anbia lil Imam Al-Bayhaqi (d. 458 AH)
160. Al-Tamhid lil Imam Ibn 'Abd al-Barr (d. 463 AH
161. Jami' Bayan al-'Ilm wa Fadlihi lil Imam Ibn 'Abd al-Barr (d. 463 A.H.)
162. Al-Rahla fi Talb al-Hadith lil Al-Khatib al-Baghdadi (d. 463 AH)
163. Al-Iqtiza ul ilm lil Al-Khatib al-Baghdadi (d. 463 A.H.)
164. Asbabul Nuzul lil Imam Abul Hasan Ali Al-Wahidi (d. 468 AH)
165. Dhimm-e-Kalam wa Ahlaho lil Abu Isma'il Al-Harawi (d. 481 AH)
166. Sharah us Sunnah lil Imam Al-Baghawi (d. 516 AH)
167. Al-Abatil wal Manakir lil Imam al-Jawzjani (d. 543 AH)
168. Musnad al-Firdous (d. 558 AH)
169. Salat and Tahajjud lil imam Ashabili (d. 582 AH)
170. Al-itebar fil Nasikh wal Mansookh minal Akhbar lil Imam Al-Haazmi (d. 584 AH)
171. Al-Ahadith al-Mukhtarah lil Diya' al-Din al-Maqdisi (d. 643 AH)
172. Al-Durra al-Thamaina fi Fazayl al-Madinah lil Ibn al-Najjar (d. 643 AH)

- Secondary books of Hadiths (Secondary Hadith books are those books that have been selected, compiled, and collated from the Primary Hadith books and are not original collections.)

1. Mishkat al-Masabih
2. Riyadh al-Saaliheen (The Meadows of the Righteous)
3. Bulugh al-Maram (Achievement of the Goal)
4. Al-Jami' al-Saghir of Jalal al-Din al-Suyuti
5. At-Targhib wat-Tarhib
6. Masabih al-Sunnah
7. Majma al-Zawa'id
8. Kanz al-Ummal
9. Zujajat al-Masabih
10. Al-Mawdū'āt Al-Kubrā (A Great Collection of Fabricated Traditions)
11. Silsalat al-Hadith as-Sahiha of Al-Albani
12. Silsilat al-Ahadith al-Daifa wa al-Mawduwa by Al-Albani
13. Al-Jami al-Kamil (The Authentic Hadith Encyclopaedia) of Ziya-ur-Rahman Azmi

== Shia collections ==
- Al-Kutub Al-Arb'ah, the Four books

1. Kitab al-Kafi of Kulayni (divided into Usul al-Kafi, Furu al-Kafi and Rawdat al-Kafi)
2. Man La Yahduruhu al-Faqih of Shaikh Saduq
3. Tahdhib al-Ahkam of Shaikh Tusi
4. Al-Istibsar of Shaikh Tusi

- Primary Hadith Collection (Primary Hadith books are those books which are collected, compiled and written by author or their students themselves).

1. The Book of Sulaym ibn Qays by Sulaym ibn Qays
2. Basa'ir al-Darajat by Sheikh Al-Safar al-Qummi
3. Kitab ul Momin by Hussain bin Saeed Ahwazi
4. Al-Mahasin by Ahmad b. Muhammad al-Barqi
5. Qurb al-isnad by Abd Allah b. Ja'far al-Himyari
6. Al-Amali of Shaikh Tusi
7. Al-Amali of Shaikh Saduq
8. Al-Tawhid of Shaikh Saduq
9. Uyoun Akhbar al-Ridha by Shaykh Saduq
10. Tuhaf al-Uqul by Ibn Shu'ba Harrani
11. Al-Amali of Shaykh al-Mufid
12. Al-Khisal of Shaykh al-Mufid
13. Kitab al-Irshad of Shaykh al-Mufid
14. Al-Amali of Al-Sharif al-Murtada
15. Nahj al-Balaghah by Al-Sharif al-Radi
16. Khasais of Al Aemmah by Al-Sharif al-Radi
17. Ghurar al-Hikam by Abul-Fath Abdul Wahid al-Amidi
18. Daim al-Islam by Al-Qadi al-Nu'man
19. Kashf al-Ghumma by Ali bin Isa al-Irdibili
20. Al-Ihtijaj by Abu Mansur Ahmad Tabrisi
21. Kamil al-Ziyarat by Ibn Qulawayh
22. Kitab al-Ghaybah by Muhammad ibn Ibrahim al-Nu'mani
23. Al Saqib Fi al-Manâqib by Ibn Hamaza Tusi
24. Tuhaf al-Uqul by Ibn Shu'ba al-Harrani
25. Maqtal al-Husayn by Ibn A'tham al-Kufi
26. Lohoof of Ibn Tawus
27. Jam'i al-Ulum va'l-Ma'arif ('Avalim'ul-Ulum va'l-Ma'arif) by Shaykh Abdu'llah Ibn Nuru'llah Bahrayni
28. Yanbu by Ibn al-Junayd al-Eskafi

- Books of the Infallibles

1. Tafseer Quran by Imam Ali
2. Book of Fatimah by Bibi Fatimah
3. Al-Sahifa al-Sajjadiyya by Ali ibn Husayn Zayn al-Abidin
4. Risalah al-Huquq by Ali ibn Husayn Zayn al-Abidin
5. Sahifat al-Ridha by Ali al-Ridha
6. Al-Risalah al-Dhahabiah by Ali al-Ridha
7. Tafseer Imam Hasan Askari by Imam Hasan al-Askari (Doubts about Authenticity)

- Secondary books of Hadiths (Secondary Hadith books are those books which are not collected, compiled and written by author himself but rather they are selected from already existing Hadith books i.e Primary Hadith books)

1. Al-Wafi by Mohsen Fayz Kashani
2. Wasā'il al-Shīʿa by Shaikh al-Hur al-Aamili
3. Bihar al-Anwar by Allama Majlesi
4. Haq ul-Yaqeen by Allama Majlisi
5. Ayn al-Hayat by Allama Majlisi
6. Mustadrak al-wasa'il by Mirza Husain Noori Tabarsi
7. Safinat al-bihar by Shaykh Abbas Qumi
8. Mafatih al-Jinan by Shaykh Abbas Qumi
9. Mustadrak safinat al-bihar by Shaykh 'Ali Namazi
10. Jami' ahadith al-Shi'a by Hossein Borujerdi
11. Nahj-al feṣāḥa by Abul Qasem Payandeh
12. Mizan Al Hikma by Mohammad Reyshahri
13. Kitab Al-Hayat by Muhammad Rida Hakimi

== Ibadi collections ==
- Jami Sahih
- Tartib al-Musnad

== See also ==
- List of Sunni books
- List of Shia books
- List of Islamic texts
