= Hadith of the City of Knowledge =

Hadith of the City of Knowledge, also known as the Hadith of the Gate of the City of Knowledge, is a narration attributed to Muhammad that describes himself and Ali ibn Abi Talib. Suyuti said that this narration is hasan. He said that al-Bazzar and al-Tabarani narrated it from Jabir ibn Abdullah, while al-Tirmidhi and al-Hakim narrated it from Ali. Suyuti said that the hadith is hasan, not sahih as al-Hakim said, and not fabricated as some scholars, including Ibn al-Jawzi and al-Nawawi, said.

== Text of the narration ==
The narration of the City of Knowledge has been reported from Muhammad in different wordings, including:

1. أنا مدينة العلم وعليّ بابها، فمن أراد العلم فليأت الباب “I am the city of knowledge, and Ali is its gate. Whoever wants knowledge should come to the gate.”
2. أنا مدينة العلم وعليّ بابها، فمن أراد المدينة فليأت الباب “I am the city of knowledge, and Ali is its gate. Whoever wants the city should come to the gate.”
3. أنا مدينة العلم وعليّ بابها، فمن أراد العلم فليأت باب المدينة “I am the city of knowledge, and Ali is its gate. Whoever wants knowledge should come to the gate of the city.”
4. أنا مدينة العلم وعليّ بابها، فمن أراد الباب فليأت عليّاً “I am the city of knowledge, and Ali is its gate. Whoever wants the gate should come to Ali.”
5. يا عليّ، أنا مدينة العلم وأنت الباب، كذب من زعم أنّه يصل إلى المدينة إلاّ من الباب “O Ali, I am the city of knowledge, and you are the gate. Whoever says he can reach the city without going through the gate is lying.”
6. أنا مدينة العلم وعليّ بابها، ولن تدخل المدينة إلاّ من بابها “I am the city of knowledge, and Ali is its gate. The city can only be entered through its gate.”
7. أنا مدينة العلم وعليّ بابها، وهل تدخل المدينة إلاّ من بابها “I am the city of knowledge, and Ali is its gate. Can the city be entered without going through its gate?”
8. أنا مدينة العلم وعليّ بابها، فمن أراد العلم فليقتبسه من عليّ “I am the city of knowledge, and Ali is its gate. Whoever wants knowledge should take it from Ali.”
9. أنا دار العلم وعليّ بابها “I am the house of knowledge, and Ali is its gate.”

== In the sources ==
This narration has been reported in different ways in both Shi'a and Sunni sources. It is mentioned in books such as al-Mustadrak 'ala al-Sahihayn, Manaqib Ibn al-Maghazili, al-Mu'jam al-Kabir, Tarikh Dimashq, Manaqib al-Khwarizmi, al-Ihtijaj, Manaqib Ibn Shahr Ashub, Tuhaf al-Uqul, Kanz al-Ummal, Uyun Akhbar al-Rida, Awali al-La'ali, al-Bidaya wa al-Nihaya, al-Amali by al-Tusi, al-Tawhid by al-Saduq, Tafsir Furat al-Kufi, al-Irshad by al-Mufid, and Yanabi al-Mawadda, among others.

== Criticism ==
Many Sunni scholars have narrated this hadith, but Ibn Taymiyyah considered it weak. In response to Ibn Taymiyyah, some have pointed to the many scholars who narrated this hadith, including al-Hakim al-Nishapuri, Ibn Hajar al-Asqalani, al-Dhahabi, Ibn Kathir, Abu al-Mu'ayyad Muwaffaq ibn Ahmad, and Ibn al-Athir. These scholars considered the hadith either authentic or hasan. Ibn al-Jawzi considered the hadith invalid in all its forms. Abu Ahmad ibn ʿAdi al-Jurjani and Muhammad Nasiruddin al-Albani rejected the hadith as authentic because of the presence of ʿAbd al-Salam al-Harawi in its chain of transmission. Muhammad Nasiruddin al-Albani classified this hadith as weak in Daʿif al-Jamiʿ al-Saghir wa Ziyadatuh.

== Distortion ==
Some have attributed this alteration of the narration to certain Sunni scholars. According to this claim, some Sunni sources contain a narration that was apparently based on the Hadith of the City of Knowledge, in order to give virtues to the Sunni caliphs and other companions. The altered narration is as follows: «أنا مدینة العلم و أبوبکر أساسها و عمر حیطانها و عثمان سقفها و علی بابها» (“I am the city of knowledge, Abu Bakr is its foundation, Umar its walls, Uthman its roof, and Ali its gate.”)

== Bibliography ==
This narration has been used as both a subject and a title for various books. Among these is Ana Madinat al-Ilm wa Ali Babaha, a book on Islamic beliefs by Sayyid Ali Milani. In this book, Sayyid Ali Milani tries to prove that the Hadith of the City of Knowledge is authentic by using Sunni sources. This book includes the names of all the narrators who have narrated this hadith. He then looks at the criticisms of the narration and responds to some of them.

== See also ==
- Ali
- Muhammad
- Hadith
