= Bulugh al-Maram =

Book by Ibn Hajar al-Asqalani

Bulugh al-Maram min Adillat al-Ahkam
- Author: Ibn Hajar al-Asqalani
- Language: Arabic
- Subject: Shafi'i jurisprudence
- Genre: Hadith collection

Bulūgh al-Marām min Adillat al-Aḥkām (Arabic: بلوغ المرام من أدلة الأحكام) translationed as: "Attainment of the Objective According to Evidences of the Ordinances," by al-Ḥāfiẓ ibn Ḥajar al-ʿAsqalānī (1372 – 1448), is a collection of hadith pertaining specifically to Shāfiʿī jurisprudence. This genre is referred to in Arabic as Aḥādīth al-Aḥkam.

== About ==
Bulūgh al-Marām contains a total of 1358 hadiths. At the end of each hadith narrated in Bulūgh al-Marām, al-Ḥāfiẓ ibn Ḥajar mentions who collected that hadith originally. Bulūgh al-Marām includes hadith drawn from numerous primary sources such as Ṣaḥīḥ al-Bukhārī, Sahih Muslim, Sunan Abu Dawud, Jāmiʿ at-Tirmidhī, Sunan al-Nasāʾī, Sunan ibn Mājah, Musnad Ahmad ibn Hanbal and more.

It holds the unique distinction that all the hadith compiled in the book have been the foundation for Shāfiʿī Islamic Jurisprudence rulings. In addition to mentioning the origins of each of the hadith in Bulūgh al-Marām, Ibn Ḥajar also included a comparison between the versions of a hadith that came from different sources. Because of its unique qualities, it still remains a widely used collection of hadith regardless of the school of thought.

== Contents ==
The book is divided into 16 chapters:

1. The Book of Purification
2. The Book of Prayer
3. The Book of Funerals
4. The Book of Zakat
5. The Book of Fasting
6. The Book of Hajj
7. The Book of Business Transactions
8. The Book of Marriage
9. The Book of Jinayat
10. The Book of Hudud
11. The Book of Jihad
12. The Book of Foods
13. The Book of Oaths and Vows
14. The Book of Judgement
15. The Book of Emancipation
16. The Comprehensive Book

== Explanations ==
- al-Badr al-Tamām by al-Ḥusayn ibn Muḥammad al-Maghribī
- Subul al-Salām by Muḥammad ibn Ismāʿīl al-Amīr al-Ṣanʿānī, who abridged al-Badr al-Tamām

== Translation ==
- Bulugh Al-Maram: Attainment of the Objective According to Evidence of the Ordinances, Dar-us-Salam; 1st edition (1996), ASIN: B000FJJURU
- Kinyarwanda translation: Kugera ku ntego : hashingiwe kuri gihamya z'amategeko y'idini ya Islam : Bulugh al maram : min adilatil ah'kam, Kigali: Maktabat al-qalam; (2019)

== Other books of Aḥādīth al-aḥkām ==
- Tahdhib al-Athar by Muhammad ibn Jarir al-Tabari
- Sunan al-Wusta by Ahmad Bayhaqi
- Sunan al-Kubra by Ahmad Bayhaqi
- ‘Umdah al-ahkam by Abd al-Ghani al-Maqdisi
- Al-Muntaqa by Majd ibn Taymiyah explained by Muhammad ash-Shawkani in Nayl al-Awtar Sharh Muntaqa al-Akhbar

== Publications ==
- Bulugh Al-Maram: Attainment of the Objective According to Evidence of the Ordinances

== See also ==
- List of Sunni books
- Ibn Hajar al-Asqalani
