= Dalail al-Nubuwwa =

Dalail al-Nubuwwa is the title of several works on the biography of Prophet Muhammad, such as:

- Dalail al-Nubuwwa (al-Isfahani) by Abu Nu'aym al-Isfahani
- Dalail al-Nubuwwa (al-Bayhaqi) by al-Bayhaqi
