= Dalail al-Nubuwwa (al-Bayhaqi) =

Sunni Hanafi hadith collection

Dalail al-Nubuwwa wa Marifat Ahwal Sahib al-Sharia
- Arabic cover
- Author: Al-Bayhaqi
- Original title: دلائل النبوة ومعرفة أحوال صاحب الشريعة
- Language: Arabic
- Subject: Hadith
- Genre: Sīrah
- Published: 11th century
- Media type: Print

Dalail al-Nubuwwa wa Marifat Ahwal Sahib al-Sharia (Arabic: دلائل النبوة ومعرفة أحوال صاحب الشريعة), simply known as Dalail al-Nubuwwa, is a Sunni Hadith collection authored by al-Bayhaqi that documents the life, miracles, and virtues of Muhammad through verified reports. It was composed to distinguish authentic narrations from weak or fabricated ones and to provide a scholarly foundation for understanding the Muhammad's authority. The work combines disciplines such as hadith, fiqh, and theology, integrating rational analysis with spiritual reflection.

== Overview ==
Composed in the early 10th century CE, Dalail al-Nubuwwa addresses deficiencies in earlier works on prophetic miracles and reports. Al-Bayhaqi observed that prior authors often recorded narrations without distinguishing between reliable and weak reports, and he aimed to correct this by applying the principles of jarh and taadil (criticism and authentication). He examined disputed cases among hadiths, interpreted them carefully, and avoided transmitting reports known to be fabricated. Al-Bayhaqī drew upon the earlier Dalā'il al-Nubuwwa of Abu Nu'aym al-Isfahani, but greatly expanded and systematized the material, producing what later scholars regarded as the most comprehensive work of its kind.

The book is structured systematically, covering the Muhammad's lineage, signs of prophethood before his birth, miracles, ethics, and personal virtues. It draws on sources including the Kutub al-Sittah, Al-Mustadrak ala al-Sahihayn, al-Waqidi’s al-Maghazi, Ibn Ishaq's Al-Sirah al-Nabawiyyah, and Ibn Manda's Dalail al-Nubuwwa, while also referencing theological authorities such as Al-Khattabi and Abu Mansur al-Ayyubi. Authentic narrations are prioritized, and weak or fabricated reports are clearly noted, preserving material from some sources now lost.

== Chapters ==
It is organized into an introduction followed by eleven sections, each detailing different aspects of Muhammad's life and prophethood. The first section covers his lineage, names, birth, childhood, and notable events, while the second describes his physical and moral characteristics in relation to earlier scriptures. The third section focuses on miraculous signs from birth until the start of his mission. The fourth section narrates key events at the beginning of his prophethood, including the first revelation, early converts, persecution by the Quraysh, migration to Abyssinia, the Miʿraj, pledges at ʿAqabah, the construction of his mosque, the change of the Qibla, and associated miracles. The fifth section records miracles during his military campaigns, and the sixth includes other extraordinary events. The seventh discusses the acceptance of his prayers, and the eighth recounts Jewish scholars who embraced Islam after receiving satisfactory answers to their questions. The ninth focuses on the fulfillment of his reports about the unseen (ghayb) as evidence of prophethood, while the tenth describes dreams, the effects of revelation, and their confirmation of his mission. The eleventh section details remarkable events during his illness and at the time of his death.

== Legacy ==
Later scholars, such as Ibn al-Subki, regarded al-Bayhaqi's Dala'il al-Nubuwwa as peerless in its genre, praising it among the works for which no equal existed. Dalail al-Nubuwwa was summarized, studied, and cited by later scholars such as Ibn Dihya al-Balansi, Muhammad b. Abd al-Rahman al-Sahawi, and Ibn al-Mulaqqin, and was published in modern editions verified by Abd al-Rahman Muhammad Uthman and Abd al-Muati Kalaji. The work also influenced other key texts on the Prophet's life and virtues, including Qadi Iyad's Al-Shifa bi Ta'rif Huquq al-Mustafa, Imam al-Suyuti's Al-Khasa'is al-Kubra, and Ibn Kathir's Al-Bidaya wa l-Nihaya.

== See also ==
- List of Sunni books
- List of hadith books
- List of biographies of Muhammad

== Sources ==
- Koertner, Mareike (2018). "Dalāʾil al-Nubuwwa Literature as Part of the Medieval Scholarly Discourse on Prophecy". Der Islam (in German). 95 (1): 91–109. doi:10.1515/islam-2018-0004. ISSN 1613-0928.
- Mukoyah; Raharusun, Agus Suyadi; Nur, Saifudin; Ahmed, Ismail Ibrahim el-Sayed (2024). "A Critical Analysis of al-Bayhaqi Hadith on Tolerance in the Preservation of Houses of Worship in Dalāil al-Nubuwwah". Diroyah: Jurnal Study Ilmu Hadis (in Indonesian). 9 (1): 134–149. doi:10.15575/diroyah.v9i1.39232. ISSN 2540-9069.
- Kırış, Şemsettin (2015). "The Sources of al-Bayhaqi's Work Dala'il al-Nubuwwa". Usul İslam Araştırmaları (in Turkish). 23 (23): 95–126. doi:10.56361/usul.173690 (inactive 10 October 2025). ISSN 1305-2632.
