= Al-Halimi =

11th-century Islamic scholar

- الحليمي
- Title: Shaykh ash-Shafi'iyyah; Al-Ḥāfiẓ

Personal life
- Born: 949 Bukhara or Gorgan
- Died: 1012 (aged 62–63)
- Era: Islamic golden age
- Region: Transoxiana
- Main interest(s): Aqidah, Kalam, Fiqh, Hadith,
- Notable idea: Al-Minhaj fi Shu'ab al-Iman
- Occupation: Scholar, Jurist, Hadith scholar, Theologian

Religious life
- Religion: Islam
- Denomination: Sunni
- Jurisprudence: Shafi'i
- Creed: Ash'ari

Muslim leader
- Influenced by: Al-Shafi'i Abu Hasan al-Ash'ari
- Influenced: Al-Bayhaqi

Abū ʿAbdallāh al-Ḥalīmī al-Qāḍī al-Ḥusayn b. al-Ḥasan b. Muḥammad b. Ḥalīm al-Bukhārī al-Jurjānī al-Shāfiʿī (Arabic: أبو عبد الله الحليمي القاضي الحسين بن الحسن بن محمد بن حليم البخاري الجرجاني الشافعي) also known as Al-Halimi (Arabic: الحليمي; 403–338 AH/ 949–1012 CE), was a highly influential Sunni scholar and regarded as the foremost leading jurist, traditionist, and theologian in Transoxiana during his time. He was one of the hadith masters who wrote significant works and was a prominent figure in the Shafi'i school of law and among the early Ash'aris.

== Life ==
Al-Halimi was born in the year (338/949–50 AH) to a free woman from Gorgan and his half-brother, Abū l-Faḍl al-Ḥasan, was born the same year to a female Turkic slave. The place where Al-Halimi was born is disputed. It was said that he was born in Gorgan and was raised in Bukhara. Other narration states he was born and raised in Bukhara. He studied hadith under several masters, including Abū Bakr b. Khanb (not Ḥabīb) and others. He studied jurisprudence under Abu Bakr al-Qaffal al-Marwazi and Abu Bakhr al-Udani. After mastering these sacred sciences, he became an alim of high consideration and authority in Transoxiana. He was known for his brilliant researching skills and treating points of the Shafi'i law. When he moved to Nishapur, he taught hadith scholars and others who gave narrations under his authority such as al-Hakim and other hadith narrators. He died in the year of 403 (1012 CE).

== Influence ==
Many scholars who came after him would often quote him pertaining matters on creed and Usul al-dín (principles of the faith). Al-Bayhaqi frequently transmitted his scholarship in his Shu'ab al-Iman and Al-Asma' wa al-Sifat.

== Reception ==
The Shafi'i historian, Al-Dhahabi refers to Imam al-Halimi as the "Head of the Mutakallimīn and Muḥaddithīn" indicating his leadership among the practitioners of Kalam and scholars of Hadith. Al-Dhahabi also calls him "Shaykh al-Shāfiʿiyyah" indicating his leadership among the jurists in the Shafi'i school.

== See also ==
- List of Ash'aris
