= Abu Dharr al-Harawi =

10th-century Islamic scholar

- Title: Muhaddith al Haramayn; Al-Ḥāfiẓ

Personal life
- Born: 946 CE/355 AH Herat, (modern-day Afghanistan)
- Died: 1042 (aged 95–96) Mecca, (modern-day Hejaz)
- Era: Islamic golden age
- Main interest: Hadith
- Occupation: Muhaddith

Religious life
- Religion: Islam
- Denomination: Sunni
- Jurisprudence: Maliki
- Creed: Ash'ari

Muslim leader
- Influenced by: Malik Ibn Anas Abu Hasan al-Ash'ari Al-Baqillani Al-Khattabi Al-Daraqutni Al-Hakim al-Nishapuri

Abū Dharr al-Harawī, ʿAbd b. Aḥmad b. Muḥammad b. ʿAbd Allāh al-Anṣārī (Arabic: أبو ذر الهروي), also known as Abū Dharr al-Harawī, was a reputable Maliki hadith specialist (muhaddith), a pious mystic, and Ash'ari theologian. He was from Herat (Afghanistan), but spent most of his lifetime in Mecca. He is frequently referred to as "Muhaddith of Haramayn" meaning "Hadith Master of the two holy cities, that is, Mecca and Medina.

== Biography ==
He was born in Herat and spent his early life there where he studied hadith under prominent scholars of the city. He became the narrator of Sahih Al-Bukhari on the authority of the three: Al-Mustamlei, Al-Hamwi, and Al-Kashmihini. As he got older, he travelled to pursue further knowledge and his most important journey is when he visited Baghdad meeting with the leading scholars. In that city, he met with the famous Al-Baqillani who taught him the Maliki jurisprudence and Ash'ari creed. He studied hadith under the leading hadith scholars such as Al-Khattabi and Al-Daraqutni. He departed from Baghdad to the west and settled in Mecca, where he lived for a while and from there he began authoring books and became a teacher, his famous students include the hadith scholar, Ibn Manzur who was the main teacher of Ibn Barrajan. He then married into the Arab community and resided in Al-Sarwan. He performed Hajj every year, residing in Makkah during the season, then returning to his family. During his old age, he went to Mecca again to perform Hajj and met with Imam al-Haramayn al-Juwayni, the religious authority and theologian. He sat with him and they discussed. Al-Khatib al-Baghdadi said: "He was trustworthy, precise, and religious. He died at the end of Shawwal, 434.

== Works ==
1. Al Mustakhraj al Al'iilzamati ("Extracted on Obligations)
2. Muskharij al Alsahihayni ("Extracted on the right")
3. Kitab Fi al sunnati Wa sifati ("A book on Sunnah and Attributes")
4. Kitab al Jami ("Collector book")
5. Kitab al Dua ("Prayer book")
6. Kitab Fadhail al Qurani ("The Book of the Virtues of the Qur’an")
7. kitab Dalail al Nubuat ("Evidence of prophecy book")
8. kitab Shahadat alzuri ("Perjury book")
9. Kitab Fadhail Malik ("Malik's virtues book")
10. Kitab Fadhail Aleydayni ("The Book of the Virtues of the Two Eids")
