= Al-Sulami =

10th-century Islamic scholar

Imam al-Sulami
- االسلمي
- Title: Shaykh al-Awliya; Al-Ḥāfiẓ

Personal life
- Born: 947 Nishapur
- Died: 1021 (aged 73–74) Nishapur
- Era: Islamic Golden Age
- Region: Khorasan
- Main interest(s): Hadith, Tafsir, Tasawwuf, Hagiography
- Occupation: Scholar, Traditionist, Mufassir, Sufi, Hagiographer

Religious life
- Religion: Islam
- Denomination: Sunni
- Jurisprudence: Shafi'i
- Creed: Ash'ari

Muslim leader
- Influenced by: Al-Shafi'i Abu Hasan al-Ash'ari Al-Daraqutni Al-Hakim al-Nishapuri
- Influenced: Al-Qushayri Al-Bayhaqi

Abū ʿAbd al-Raḥmān Muḥammad ibn al-Ḥusayn al-Sulamī al-Shāfiʿī (Arabic: أبو عبد الرحمن محمد بن الحسين السلمي الشافعي), commonly known as al-Sulami (Arabic: السلمي; 412-325 AH/ 947–1021 CE), was a Sunni Muslim scholar and saint based in Khorasan. He was a celebrated Shafi'i traditionist, Quran commentator, Sufi hagiographer, and a prolific writer. Al-Dhahabi said of him: "He was of very high status."

== Family ==
Al-Sulami traced his paternal lineage to the Azd tribe and his maternal lineage to the Sulaym tribe, from which he derived the nisba "al-Sulami" rather than that of his father's tribe. His father, al-Husayn, was an ascetic renowned for his devotion to self-discipline and was associated with prominent Sufi figures, including Abu Bakr al-Shibli, Ibn Munazil, and Abu Ali al-Thaqafi. His mother, the daughter of the Nishapuri scholar and Sufi Abu Amr Ibn Nujayd, was likewise known for her piety and religious devotion.

Following the death of his father during his youth, al-Sulami was raised under the care of his maternal grandfather, Ibn Nujayd. A respected Sufi, Ibn Nujayd had studied with leading mystics such as Abu Nasr al-Sarraj, author of al-Luma', one of the earliest extant works on Sufism. He is also reported to have received the Sufi cloak (khirqa) from Ibrahim ibn Muhammad al-Nasrabadi and, according to another tradition, from Abu Sahl al-Sa'luki. Upon Ibn Nujayd's death, al-Sulami inherited a substantial share of his grandfather's wealth. This inheritance not only spared him from financial hardship but also enabled him to assemble an extensive personal library, a rare distinction for a scholar of his time.

== Early life ==
=== Birth ===
Al-Sulami was born in Nishapur in 325 AH (947 CE) into a family of modest means.

=== Education ===
Al-Sulami began studying and transmitting hadith at the remarkably young age of eight, narrating reports both from written collections and through direct instruction received from his teacher, Shaykh Abu Bakr al-Subghi. An avid student of Hadith, al-Sulami travelled extensively and narrated hadiths from scholars in Nishapur, Merv, Iraq, Hejaz (Mecca and Medina) and he transmitted Hadith to narrators for over 40 years. His works became prominent and have spread far wide during his lifetime.

=== Teachers ===
Al-Sulami studied under numerous Hadith scholars, his most prominent ones include:

- Al-Daraqutni
- Al-Hakim al-Nishapuri
- Bin Muhammad al-Nishapuri (Hadith master)
- Abu Amr Ismail Bin Nujayd (his Muhaddith grandfather)

== Students ==
Al-Sulami had many students who narrated from him, among them were:

- Al-Qushayri
- Al-Bayhaqi
- Ahmed al-Thaqafi al-Jubari (Imam of Asbahan)
- Ahmad Ibn Muhammad al-Ghazali al-Tusi (the uncle of the great Imam al-Ghazali)
- Umar Ibn Ismail al-Jissimi (a jurist scholar)

== Death ==
Towards the end of his lifetime, al-Sulami founded a spiritual khanqa for Iʿtikāf. His intention was to build a solitude for pious worshippers and spiritual seekers of Nishapur, which was then visited by the famous Imam al-Khatib. When Al-Sulami died, he was buried in the same spiritual house he founded. His date of death was on the 3rd of Sha'ban 412 (12 November 1021).

== Legacy ==
To this date, al-Sulami works remain one of the most important authorities in early history of Sufi literature and many of his books have been preserved over the centuries. It has been both copied and produced since the middle of the last century. Preserved more than any other Sufi source, al-Sulami writings on the explanation of the mystical meanings behind the letters shows a method in which Sufis of the second/eight to the fourth/tenth centuries have interpreted the meaning of the Arabic letters and alphabetic groupings.

== Reception ==
Al-Hakim said: "He was abundant in his auditions and narrations of Hadiths and meticulous in narration."

Abu Nu'aym said: He achieved complete Mastery of the Ways of the Awliya (Tassawuf), so much as to summarize it according to the explanation of the ancient (oldest Friends of God).

Al-Khatib said: "Al-Sulami was a proficient authority in Hadith."

Al-Dhahabi said: The Imam, the hafiz, the Muhaddith, the Sheikh of Khorasan, and the great Sufi."

== Works ==
Al-Sulami started writing and authoring when he was in his 20's and continued to write until his death 50 years later. He authored over 100 works:

- Adaab al-Sufiya, a book on the manners of the Sufis.
- Adaab al-Suhba wa Husn al-Ushra
- Amtaal al-Qu'ran
- Al-Arba'een fi al-Hadith, a text written about simple living and Ascetism (abandoning the world to seek Allah).
- Bayaan Ahwaal al-Sufiyya
- Darajaat al-Muamalaat, an explanatory text glossary different Sufi terminology & words.
- Darajaat al-Sadiqeen, a text about the ranks of the Righteous.
- Al-Farq Bayn al-Sharia wal Haqiqa
- Al-Futuwwa ("Spiritual Chivalry" )
- Ghalataat al-Sufiyya, a critical text about certain Sufi exclamations expressing emotions and refutation against false beliefs such as indwelling, incarnation & reincarnation, uncreatedness of the soul, etc.
- Haqaiq al-Tafsir, a commentary on the Noble Qu'ran from a Sufi spiritual perspective which achieved much fame in Al-Sulami's lifetime.
- Al-Ikhwatu wal-Akhaawaat min al-Sufiyya
- Al-Istishadaat
- Jamaami Adaab al-Sufiyya
- Al-Malamatiyya, a detailed expose text that was published in Cairo in 1945.
- Manaahij al-Arifeen
- Maqamaat al-Awliya, ("The Spiritual Stations of the Friends of Allah"). Sheikh al-Akhbar Ibn Arabi used it for his book, 'Muhadaraat al-Abrar'.
- Masail Waradat min Makka
- Mihan al-Sufiyya ("The Trails of the Sufis")
- Al-Muqaddima fi al-Tassawuf Wa Haqiqatih
- Al-Radd ala Ahle al-Kalam, Al-Sama
- Al-Sualaat, a text about technical questions that Sheikh Al-Sulami put forward to the Hadith Master, Sheikh Al-Daraqutni concerning the narrators of Hadiths
- Suluk al-Arifeen
- Sunan al-Sufiyya
- Tabaqaat al-Sufiyya, this was a biographical masterpiece that Al-Sulami compiled.
- Tahzib al-Nasikh wal-Mansukh fil Qu'ran lu Ibn Shihab al-Zuhri
- Tarikh Ahle al-Suffa, which was compiled before his masterpiece, the Tabaqaat. Al-Dhahabi uses it much as a reference in is book, Tarikh al-Islam (History of Islam) and Imam al-Asbahani uses it in his Hilyat al-Awliya.
- Uyub al-Nafs wa Mudaratuha
- Wasiyya
- Zilal al-Faqr
- Al-Zuhd, this work consists in narrations (Hadiths) from the first three generations of believers: the companions (Sahaba), the pious successor (Tabi'un) and their successors (Tabi' al-Tabi'in).

== See also ==
- List of Ash'aris
- List of Sufis
