= Mawaddat al-Qurba =

Expressed love for the close of kin (Arabic: Mawaddat al-Qurba) is a Hadith collection purportedly written by Mir Sayyid Ali Hamadani.

The book's name is based on the Qur'anic verse 42:23, a verse according to many Muslims makes love to the Ahl al-Bayt obligatory.

The author, after having read the Qur'anic verse that demand Muslim to express love (mawaddat) for the Ahl al-Bayt (fi al-Qurba), started to collect narrations regarding them. At the end, it mounted up to a book. His book is praised by Shi'as having many hadith that support the Shi'a view.

This book is quoted in Yanabi al-Muwadda purportedly authorized by Sulayman al-Qunduzi.
