= Ibn Hibban =

9th and 10th-century Sunni scholar

Imam Shaykh al-Islam Ibn Hibban ابن حبان
- Title: Sheikh of Khorasan

Personal life
- Born: 270 A.H. (884 CE) Bust (current name Lashkargah), Saffarid dynasty(present-day Afghanistan)
- Died: 354 A.H. (965 CE) Bust (current name Lashkargah), Saffarid dynasty(present-day Afghanistan)
- Resting place: Lashkargah, Afghanistan
- Era: Islamic Golden Age, Middle Abbasid era
- Main interest: Hadith studies
- Notable work: Sahih Ibn Hibban
- Occupation: Muhaddith, Hadith compiler, Islamic scholar

Religious life
- Religion: Islam
- Denomination: Sunni
- Jurisprudence: Shafi'i
- Creed: Ash'ari

Muslim leader
- Influenced by: Al-Shafi'i Al-Nasa'i Ibn Khuzaymah Abu al-Hasan al-Ash'ari
- Influenced: Al-Hakim al-Nishapuri Al-Daraqutni Al-Khattabi Ibn Manda
- Arabic name
- Personal (Ism): Muhammad (محمد)
- Patronymic (Nasab): Ibn Hibban ibn Ahmad ibn Hibban (ابن حبان ابن أحمد ابن حبان)
- Teknonymic (Kunya): Abu Hatim, Abu Bakr (ابو حاتم, ابو بكر)
- Toponymic (Nisba): al-Tamimi al-Darimi al-Busti (التمیمی الدارمی البستی)

Muḥammad ibn Hibbān al-Bustī (Arabic: محمد ابن حبان البستی) (c. 270–354/884–965) was a Muslim Arab scholar, polymath and a prominent Shafi'i traditionist, ḥadith critic, evaluator of rijal, compiler and interpreter of hadith. He was a prolific writer and well-versed in numerous Islamic fields such as fiqh (reaching the level of Ijtihad) as well as in the sciences of astronomy, medicine, history and other disciplines.

== Biography ==
=== Birth ===
Ibn Hibban was born in 270 AH (884 CE) in Bust or Bost in present-day southern Afghanistan (former name of Helmand province capital was Bost or Bust, its new name is Lashkargah).

=== Education ===
Imam Ibn Hibban grew up in the city of Bust, where he spent his childhood and early youth, then left for education. In thirst for knowledge, this imam was travelling countries from Transoxania and reaching far as Egypt. During these intense travels, he had numerous teachers whom he narrated from.

=== Teachers ===
He studied Islamic sciences with many prominent scientists of the time, such as:

- Al-Nasa'i
- Al-Hasan ibn Sufyan
- Abu al-Ya'la al-Mosuli
- Al-Husayn ibn Idris al-Harawi
- Abu al-Khalifa al-Jamhi
- Imran ibn Musa ibn Madzhashi'
- Ahmad ibn al-Hasan al-Sufi
- Ja'far ibn Ahmad al-Dimashqi
- Ibn Khuzaymah

=== Career ===
Ibn Hibban became judge in Samarkand for a time and built a Khanqah in the town; and in 340 A. H./951 A. D. he went to his birth town, Bust and built there a madrasah for his students, in which they were given stipends.

=== Students ===
His most famous students became leading scholars of their time:

- Al-Hakim al-Nishapuri
- Al-Daraqutni
- Al-Khattabi
- Ibn Manda

=== Death ===
Ibn Hibban died in Bust on a Friday night, eight days before the end of the month of Shawwal in 354 AH. He was buried in his native town Bost or Bust (currently Lashkargah) in present-day southern Afghanistan.

== Theology ==
When returning to Sijistan, after studying in Nishapur with Ibn Khuzaymah, Ibn Hibban was opposed by some of the Hanbalis as he taught that God does not have limits, rejecting their belief in al-Hadd lillah (limits for God). Furthermore, these local Hanbalis accused him of Zandaqa (heresy) for his statement al-Nubuwwa 'ilmun wa 'amal (prophecy consists of a knowledge and action). Due to this he left for Samarkand, where he became a Judge.

Ibn al-Subki relates an incident between Ibn Hibban and the Hanbalites in his famous book entitled Tabaqat al-Shafi'yya al-Kubra where Abu Ismail al-Harawi said: "I asked Yahya ibn Ammar about Ibn Hibban saying "Did you see him?" He said, "How could I not have seen him, considering that we expelled him from Sijistan? He had a lot of knowledge, but not much religious feeling. He came to us and denied that Allah has limits, so we drove him out of Sijistan." Ibn al-Subki comments on this: "Look at how ignorant this critic is! I wish I knew who is more deserving of criticism! One who affirms limits for his Lord, or the one who denies them?"

One of his enemies, al-Sulaymani (d. 404/1014) claimed that Ibn Hibban owed his appointment to Samanid vizier Abu al-Tayyib al-Mu'sabi for whom he wrote a refutation of the Karmatis.

Whenever he was in Mashhad during distress, he would visit Imam Reza Shrine and ask for relief that would always come, “time after time again.”

== Reception ==
Al-Hakim, his student, the author of the Al-Mustadrak, said: “Abu Hatim Al-Basti Al-Qadi was one of the vessels of knowledge in language, jurisprudence, hadith and preaching, and among the wise men. He was classified, and he came out of the classification in the hadith that had not preceded him."

Al-Dhahabi said: "The imam, the scholar, the hafiz, the majestic, the sheikh of Khorasan… the author of the famous books."

== Works ==
Khatib al-Baghdadi recommended 40 books of his for study. Most of his works have however perished even though he made an effort to preserve them by leaving his house and library in Nishapur as a Waqf for the transmission of his books. His Tarikh al-Thikat, a work of Ilm al-Rijal, was utilised by hadith critics such as al-Dhahabi, Ibn Hajar al-Asqalani etc.

In total, Ibn Hibban wrote almost 60 books on different topics of Islamic Science but his master piece is Sahih Ibn Hibban (originally titled: Al-Musnad al-Sahih ala al-Takasim wa al-Anwa). Some of them are listed below:

- Kitab al Sahaba (five volumes)
- Kitab al Tabi`yyun (twelve volumes)
- Kitab al-Atba` al Tabi`yeen (fifteen volumes)
- Kitab Taba al-Atba` (seventeen volumes)
- Kitab Taba` al Taba` (twenty volumes)
- Kitab `ala al Awham (ten volumes)
- Kitab al Rihla (two volumes)
- Kitab al Fasl Bayna Akhbarna wa Haddathana
- Tarikh al-Thiqat,
- Ilal wa Awham al-Mu’arrikhin
- Ilal Manaqib al-Zuhri(twenty volumes)
- Ilal Hadith Malik(ten volumes)
- Ilal ma Asnada Abu Hanifah (ten volumes)
- Ghara’ib al-Kufiyeen(ten volumes)
- Ghara’ib ahl al-Basrah (eight volumes)
- Mawquf ma Rufi`a (ten volumes)
- Al-Mu`jam `ala al-Mudun (ten volumes)
- Al-Hidayah ila al-`Ilm al-Sunan

== Bibliography ==
- "ابن حبان". Shamela.ws. Archived from the original on 9 March 2013.
- Al-Dhahabi. Tazkirat al-Huffaz.
