= Fatemeh Daqaq =

Iranian Muslim narrator, Quran-ologist and Sufi (1010 - 1088)

Fatemeh Daqaq Neyshabouri
- Born: 1010; Nishapur
- Died: 1088 (aged 77–78)
- Occupations: scholar of the Qur'an, Hadith
- Relatives: Abu Ali Daqaq Neishaburi (Father)

Fatemeh Daqaq Neyshabouri (1010 – 1088), (full name: Umm al-Binin Fatima bint Abu Ali Daqaq Neishaburi) was a female Iranian Muslim Hadith studies scholar, a scholar of the Quran and a Sufi, a memorizer of the Qur'an in the 4th century Hijri. She was one of the prominent students of Al-Hakim al-Nishapuri in the science of hadith.
