= Al-Daraqutni =

Muslim scholar and traditionist (918–995)

Imam Al-Daraqutni
- ٱلدَّارَقُطْنِيّ
- Title: Amir al-Mu'minin fī al-Hadith; Shaykh al-Islām; Al-Ḥāfiẓ

Personal life
- Born: 918 Baghdad, Abbasid Caliphate
- Died: 995 (aged 76–77) Baghdad, Abbasid Caliphate
- Era: Islamic Golden Age
- Region: Iraq
- Main interest(s): Hadith, Qur'anic recitation
- Notable work: Sunan al-Daraqutni
- Occupation: Scholar, Traditionist,

Religious life
- Religion: Islam
- Denomination: Sunni
- Jurisprudence: Shafi'i
- Creed: Ash'ari

Muslim leader
- Influenced by: Al-Shafi'i Abu al-Hasan al-Ash'ari Ibn Hibban Abu al-Qasim al-Baghawi Abu Bakr ibn Mujahid
- Influenced: Al-Hakim al-Nisaburi Abu Nu'aym al-Isfahani Abu Dharr al-Harawi Al-Baqillani Al-Sulami Al-Khatib al-Baghdadi

Ali ibn Umar al-Daraqutni (Arabic: عَلِيّ بْن عُمَر ٱلدَّارَقُطْنِيّ, romanized: ʿAlī ibn ʿUmar al-Dāraquṭnī; 918–995 CE / 306–385 AH), was a Sunni Muslim scholar and traditionist best known for compiling the hadith collection Sunan al-Daraqutni. He is commonly celebrated in Sunni tradition with titles such as "Imam" and "Amir al-Mu'minin fi al-Hadith".

== Biography ==
=== Birth ===
Al-Daraqutni was born in c. 918 CE/306 AH in the Dar al-Qutn (Arabic: دار القطن, romanized: Dār al-Quṭn) quarter of Baghdad, whence he got his nisba.

=== Education ===
Al-Daraqutni grew up in a house of knowledge and virtue, as his father was one of the trustworthy Hadith transmitters, and he watched him in his youth frequenting the circles of knowledge and hearing, memorizing his audios and narrations, and spending the clouds of his day learning and studying. His studies were initially largely restricted to his native Iraq, where he frequented Wasit, Basra and Kufa. Later in life, he travelled to Syria and Egypt and while in the latter, he enjoyed the patronage of the Ikhishid vizier Jafar bin al-Fadl for assisting him with compiling his own hadith collection.

=== Teachers ===
His teachers in this period include

- Ibn Hibban
- The son of Abu Dawood
- Abu al-Qasim al-Baghawi
- Ibn Mujahid, from whom he learned the different recitations of the Quran
- Abu Sa'id al-Istakhri

=== Students ===
His students included the hadith scholars:

- Al-Hakim al-Nishapuri
- Abu Nu'aym al-Isfahani
- Abu Dharr al-Harawi
- Al-Baqillani
- Al-Sulami

=== Death ===
He died in 995 CE/385 AH and was buried in the Bab al-Dayr cemetery in Baghdad, near the grave of Maruf Karkhi.

== Theological position ==
A staunch Shafi'i, al-Daraqutni was wary of relying on reason and even rejected well-known hadiths that praised it. Nevertheless, he showed some appreciation for kalām. He is said to have told Abu Dharr al-Harawi that Abu Bakr al-Baqillani (d. 403/1013), an early Ash'ari authority, that “This is the Imām of the Muslims, the defender of the religion, the supporter of the Sunnah, and the suppressor of the Mu'tazila.” Despite his personal dislike for speculative theology, al-Daraqutni authored a rebuttal against the Mu'tazila and likely recognized its usefulness when confronting rationalist opponents.

If Baghdad's public milieu had been more supportive of middle-of-the-road traditionalism, Al-Daraqutni, a Shafi'te inhabitant, would have rejected the anthropomorphic account as unreliable. However, the Hanbali extremists who controlled Baghdad made it nearly difficult to reject the anthropomorphic version. The poem gives precise instructions to the Muhaddithun, who were perplexed when they came across these two distinct, if not contradictory, writings, in addition to the implicit preference for the mild version over the anthropomorphic one. Al-Daraqutni bluntly described the most crucial aspect of the Ash'arite method of transmission in this short poem: a systematic insistence on a strict transmission procedure in which the text was communicated verbatim without any verbal or gestural embellishments. Al-Daraqutni undoubtedly saw this stringent procedure as a defence against anthropomorphism. In other words, Hanbalite violence forced Baghdad's middle-of-the-road traditionalists to accept the anthropomorphic version in the tenth century.

According to Ibn al-Jawzi's book entitled Mirat al Zamanwzi, Al-Daraqutni considered Ibn Qutayba to be one of the innovators whose beliefs leaned towards anthropomorphism attributing direction, shape and image to God. He also claimed that Ibn Qutayba showed enmity towards Ahl al-Bayt. Al-Daraqutni wrote a treatise against Muʿtazilite Amr ibn Ubayd on the subject of anthropomorphic narrations in relation to God's attributes and defending the ambiguous texts by providing evidence for its authenticity.

== Works ==
Several of al-Daraqutni's extant works have been published:

=== General hadith works ===
- al-Sunan, his primary hadith collection.
- Kitab al-du'afa wa-l-matrukin, an alphabetically ordered list of 632 hadith transmitters considered to be da'if or rejected.
- al-'Ilal al-warida fi al-ahadith
- al-Mukhtalif wa-l mu'talif fi asma al-rijal, a list of hadith transmitters who names are similar in spelling but differ in pronunciation.

=== Works on Sahih al-Bukhari and Sahih Muslim ===
Al-Daraqutni wrote a series of commentaries, addendums and analyses of narrations contained within Sahih al-Bukhari and Sahih Muslim.

- Dhikr asma' al-tabi'in wa-man ba'dahum mimman sahhat riwayatuhuu min al-thiqat 'ind Muhammad ibn Isma'il al-Bukhari
- Dhikr asma' al-tabi'in wa-man ba'dahum mimman sahhat riwayatuhu 'ind Muslim
- al-Ilzamat ala sahiay al-Bukhari, a compilation of 109 narrations whose chains of narration, according to al-Daraqutni, satisfy the requirements for inclusion in Sahih al-Bukhari and Sahih Muslim.
- Asma al-sahaba allati ittafaqa fiha al-Bukhari wa-Muslim wa-ma infarada bihi kull minhuma
- Kitab al-tatabbu'
- Kitab fi dhikr riwayat al-sahihayn

==== Kitab al-tattabu ====
In his Kitab al-tatabbu', al-Daraqutni reviews 217 narrations within the two collections which he deems to be flawed using both isnad and matn criticism. Reasons given include the isnad not meeting the requirements for inclusion in the collections, and the commentary of the hadith's transmitters being inadvertently merged with its matn. Jonathan A. C. Brown cautions that the work is an adjustment to the two collections rather than an attack on their overall integrity.

=== Works on theology ===
- Kitāb as-sifāt, a collection of hadiths concerning the attributes of God.
- Kitab al-Ru'ya, a collection of hadiths concerning the vision of Allah on the Day of Judgement.
- Ahadith An-Nuzūl, a collection of hadiths concerning the descent (nuzūl) of Allah from the heavens.

=== Other ===
- Kitab al-qira'at, a work on the different recitations of the Quran.

== See also ==
- List of Ash'aris
