= Al-Khattabi =

10th-century Islamic scholar

Imam Al-Khaṭṭābī
- الخطابي
- Title: Al-Ḥāfiẓ

Personal life
- Born: 931 Bust
- Died: 998 (aged 66–67) Bust
- Era: Islamic golden age
- Region: Sijistan
- Main interest(s): Hadith, Fiqh, Aqidah, Philology, Lexicography, Poetry
- Notable work: A'lam al-Sunan
- Occupation: Muhaddith, Scholar, Jurist, Philologist, Lexicographer, Poet

Religious life
- Religion: Islam
- Denomination: Sunni
- Jurisprudence: Shafi'i
- Creed: Ash'ari

Muslim leader
- Influenced by: Al-Shafi'i Abu Ubaid al-Qasim bin Salam Abu al-Hasan al-Ash'ari Ibn Hibban
- Influenced: Al-Hakim al-Nishapuri Abu Nu'aym al-Isfahani Abu Dharr al-Harawi Al-Bayhaqi Al-Baghawi

Abū Sulaymān, Ḥamd b. Muḥammad b. Ibrāhīm b. al-Khaṭṭāb Abū Sulaymān al-Khaṭṭābī, al-Bustī, commonly known as Al-Khaṭṭābī (Arabic: الخطابي), was a Sunni Islamic scholar from Sijistan. He is unanimously regarded as the leading figure in the sciences of Hadith and Shafi'i jurisprudence. He was widely considered to be one of the most intelligent and authoritative scholars of his time, renowned for his trustworthiness and reliability in transmitting narrations, and the author of a many famous works. Moreover, he was famously known as the man of letters, philologist, and lexicographer, as well as a master in poetry.

== Political climate ==
During the time Abu Sulayman al-Khattabi lived, Islamic civilization in the eastern regions of the empire saw especially significant, if not dramatic, change. On the one hand, the Sunni elements of Muslim culture that originated earlier had grown so powerful that they appeared certain to triumph in the struggle for governmental authority and dominance. However, the Abbasid dynasty had evolved into a "champion of perceived orthodoxy" and a "symbol of religious unity" although already experiencing political weakness. However, Muslim intellectuals and leaders were extremely concerned about the techniques and strategies that religious scholars (ulama) in general and legal experts (fuqaha) in particular would employ to identify the "right religious path" guiding Muslims' lives and societies.

== Name ==
The name "Al-Khattabi" is based on his origin. It is said that Abu Sulayman al-Khattabi was a descendant of Zayd ibn al-Khattab, a brother of the second caliph, Umar Ibn Al-Khattab.

== Early life ==
=== Birth ===
Al-Khattabi was born in Rajab 319 which corresponds to July 931 in Bust (now Lashkargah) which is a city in south of Afghanistan.

=== Education ===
Since he made his living through trade, al-Khattabi's numerous travels allowed him to see a great deal of the eastern region of the Islamic empire. His travels were motivated by his desire to learn and grow. Al-Khattabi's enduring "thirst of knowledge" nevertheless propelled him to go on multiple lengthy expeditions as he grew older. In addition to the cities and regions he spent the most of his life in, he journeyed between Bust, Nishapur, the Hejaz (Mecca and Medina), Basra, and Baghdad, which is home to him. He travelled between Bust, Nishapur, the Hejaz (Mecca and Medina), Basra, Baghdad (where he spent most of his lifetime) and other cities and regions of the eastern Islamic world.

=== Teachers ===
The core areas of study for al-Khattabi were Islamic jurisprudence and the Hadith literature. He is reported to have studied under the “leading scholars of his time” and, according to Yaqut al-Hamawi, “to have acquired knowledge from many of those possessing it”.

Al-Khattabi departed from Bust at an early age and went to Baghdad to study Islamic jurisprudence under the guidance of Ibn Abi Hurayrah (d. 345/556), a teacher of law and Hadith, and Abu Bakr al-Najjad (d. 348/959), a master of Hadith and literature. After that, he became a member of Abu 'Ali al-Saffar's (d 451/952) study circle and committed himself to learning Arabic philology and literature. He studied Tasawwuf under al-Khuldi (d. 348/959), a student of Junayd al-Baghdadi. Later, he travelled to Basra, where he studied under the renowned Hadith and Islamic law expert Abu Bakr Ibn Dasa (d. 346/957). Before departing for Khorasan and Transoxiana, he studied Hadith literature at Mecca under the guidance of Hadith expert Abu Sa'id ibn al-A'rabi (3. 341/952). Finally, in Nishapur, he studied for several years under the esteemed Hadith scholar Abu al-'Abbas al-Asamm (d. 356/957) and the reputable scholar Abu Bakr al-Qaffal al-Shashi, who was very knowledgeable in a wide range of related Islamic studies. Under him he studied Islamic law.

== Scholarly life ==
=== Scholastic specialization ===
Among the biographers who have written overwhelmingly positive things about al-Khattabi are his colleague and friend Abu Mansur al-Tha'alibi of Nishapur, draws scientific attention to his writing activities (ta'lif) as well as his expertise in belletristic literature (adab), ascetism (zuhd), piety (wara), and transmission of knowledge and teaching (tadris). Owing to his unique academic credentials and abilities, al-Khattabi's peers equated him to Abu Ubaid al-Qasim bin Salam, the renowned Qur'anic scholar, philologist, and narrator of Prophetic traditions. Al-Tha'alibi points out that the sole distinction between the two scholars was that, in addition to his accomplishments in science, al-Khattabi was also a gifted poet.

=== Students ===
Al-Khattabi had a number of students, some of whom achieved prominence in their own right; from them:

- Al-Hakim al-Nishapuri
- Abu Nu'aym al-Isfahani
- Abu Dharr al-Harawi
- Abu Hamid al-Isfarayini
- Abd al-Ghafir al-Nishapuri
- Abu Ubaydh al-Harawi

== Death ==
During the end of his lifetime, he returned to his hometown, Bust, and met with the Sufi monastery, where he would join them located right at the Helmand River right near his hometown. He died there at the age of 67 on the date of Rabi' al-Akhir 388 which corresponds to April 998.

== Theological position ==
Abu Sulayman al-Khattabi was an adherent of the Ash'ari school. In his book entitled Ma'alim al-Sunan, he stated the middle path position in dealing with ambiguous ahadith regarding the attributes of God:

The people of our time have split into two parties. The first one [The Mu'tazila and their sub-groups] altogether disavow this kind of hadith and declare them forged outright. This implies their giving the lie to the scholars who have narrated them, that is the imams of our religion and the transmitters of the Prophetic ways, and the intermediaries between us and Allah's Messenger. The second party [Mujassimah (Anthropomorphists)] give their assent to the narrations and apply their outward (apparent) meaning literally in a way bordering anthropomorphism and. As for us we steer clear from both views, and accept neither as our school. It is therefore incumbent upon us to seek for these hadiths, when they are cited and established as authentic from the perspectives of transmissions and attributes, as an interpretation derived according to the known meaning of the foundations of the Religion and the schools of the scholars, without rejecting the narration outright, as long as their chains are acceptable narrators are trustworthy.

Commenting on the nature of Divine attributes, Abu Sulayman al-Khattabi clarified that the affirmation of Allah being above the Throne did not imply physical spatial containment or direction:

...And the meaning of the Muslims' statement: 'Indeed, Allah is over the Throne' is not that He is touching it, above it in place, or located in any direction from it. Rather, He is distinct from all of His creation. It is simply a report that has come via Divine text (tawqif), so we affirm it and negate any modality (takyeef) from Him, because 'There is nothing like unto Him, and He is the All-Hearing, the All-Seeing.'

== Views ==
Al-Khattabi was one of the foremost Sunni scholars of the fourth/tenth century and sought to restore what he regarded as the proper balance between Ahl al-Hadith wa al-Athar (the scholars of hadith and transmitted reports) and the Ahl al-Fiqh wa al-Nazar (the jurists and scholars of reflective reasoning). Acting as an impartial arbiter rather than a partisan of either discipline, he carefully evaluated the strengths and shortcomings of both communities and argued that each had become deficient through neglect of the other's expertise.

Al-Khattabi criticized many hadith scholars for limiting themselves to the mere transmission of reports without acquiring a sufficient understanding of their contextual meanings, legal implications, and linguistic subtleties. Al-Khattabi was deeply troubled by the hostility that Hadith scholars directed toward jurists (fuqaha). The traditionists often vilified jurists, falsely accusing them of abandoning Prophetic norms in favour of human reason. Al-Khattabi openly condemned this behaviour, stating that Hadith scholars were sinning by defaming the jurists and failing to realize that they could not match the legal depths achieved by the fuqaha. He maintained that mastery of riwayah (transmission) had to be complemented by dirayah (critical understanding). At the same time, he vigorously defended hadith and its scholars against the attacks of heterodox sects while urging the muhaddithun to cultivate expertise in the Arabic language, jurisprudence, and legal interpretation. To facilitate this objective, he authored the first commentaries on Sahih Bukhari and Sunan Abi Dawud, guiding readers toward a more comprehensive understanding of the Prophetic tradition.

His criticism extended equally to the jurists. Al-Khattabi observed that many fuqaha possessed only limited knowledge of hadith criticism and often failed to distinguish between authentic and defective reports or between accepted and rejected narrations. He reproached those who cited weak traditions in support of legal arguments simply because they accorded with the established positions of their legal schools. A distinguished Shafi'i jurist and mujtahid in both the principles (usul) and substantive rulings (furuʿ) of Islamic law, al-Khattabi rejected the notion that jurisprudence should be confined to the opinions of the founders of the legal schools or that the gate of ijtihad had effectively closed. Instead, he argued that the Prophet's hadith the second foundational source of Islam must remain the primary basis of legal reasoning, as it had been among the earliest generations. Restricting jurisprudence to later juristic opinions while neglecting the Sunnah, he maintained, could bring no benefit to the religion.

Rather than presenting the disciplines of hadith and jurisprudence as rivals, al-Khattabi argued that they were fundamentally interdependent. He famously described hadith as the "foundation" (asl) upon which religious knowledge rests, while jurisprudence constituted the "building" (bina') erected upon that foundation. A building without a foundation inevitably collapses, while a foundation without a building remains a ruin. Although the two communities depended upon one another, he lamented that they had become like "brothers estranged from one another," neither supporting nor learning from each other. His reform programme therefore called upon both hadith scholars and jurists to recognize their mutual dependence and to combine rigorous textual scholarship with sound legal reasoning.

His conciliatory programme extended to theology. Al-Khattabi vigorously defended Sunni orthodoxy against the objections of the Mu'tazilah and other heterodox groups, while also rejecting the anthropomorphic tendencies of the Mushabbihah and Mujassimah. Although he warned against the misuse of speculative theology (kalam), his criticism was directed less against rational inquiry itself than against those who employed theological argumentation without the requisite scholarly qualifications. His writings advocate preserving traditional Sunni doctrine through a combination of careful textual analysis and disciplined reflective reasoning (nazar), his thought reflects the characteristic moderation of the Ash'ari tradition.

== Legacy ==
In his three major works on Hadith, Al-Khattabi earned his spot in Islamic intellectual history as a major pioneer in the science of Hadith studies for his famous works. This assessment's accuracy is supported by a number of factors. Firstly, his Ma'alim al-Sunan is not only one of the most well-known medieval commentaries of a reliable compilation of Prophetic traditions in general and Abu Dawud al-Sijistani collection in particular; it is also considered the first-ever commentary of what was to become the official body of Sunni Hadith literature. It is also by far the most referenced in relation to Sunan Abi Dawood by scholars of the past and present. Secondly, his commentary on al-Bukhari's Sahih entitled A'lam al-Sunan, which he wrote soon after the Ma'alim is considered valuable for at least two reasons: (a) It is the first commentary on Sahih al-Bukhari, which is a collection of writings that is considered the most significant of the six canonical Sunni books of traditions. (b) Al-Khattabi's commentary of Sahih al-Bukhari is highly original in many ways, producing a work that is better described as a polemical treatise than a neutral commentary. Put differently, the commentators of al-Khattabi on the two most significant Hadith collections are not only the first and most comprehensive, but also the most underappreciated, literature of Hadith commentary; in fact, they founded the genre.

His book Gharib al-Hadith suppresses an important contribution to another kind of hadith study, which looked at rare and frequently unique prophetic narratives drawn from the body of Hadith literature rather than from a single Hadith collection. Al-Khattabi, then, did two things: first, he followed in the footsteps of eminent scholars who are well-known for their works in this subcategory of Hadith studies, such as Ibn Sallam al-Harawi and Ibn Qutayba; second, he inspired later scholars with his own research in this field, most notably his student Abu Ubayd al-Harawi (d. 401/1011). His other works have also reached great prominence.

Al-Khattabi was an eminent authority in both the transmission (riwayah) and critical understanding (dirayah) of hadith, and was also a distinguished hafiz (master memorizer) of hadith. Al-Khattabi possessed extensive knowledge of the majority of the hadith collections compiled up to the fourth/tenth century. He was likewise one of the foremost scholars of his era in the fields that fall under dirayat al-hadith (the critical and analytical study of hadith). He classified hadith into three categories: sahih (sound), hasan (fair), and daʿif (weak), and is credited with formulating the first comprehensive definition of the sahih hadith. He also defined the hasan hadith differently from al-Tirmidhi, and it was his definition that Ibn al-Salah later adopted as the standard definition of hasan li-dhatihi ("intrinsically fair") hadith in his foundational Muqaddimah fi Ulum al-Hadith.

== Works ==
Al-Khattabi's authored many famous scholarly works which include:

- Sharh Sunan Abi Dawood' (Expounding on Sunan Abi Dawood), considered the earliest and one of the best commentaries of Sunan Abu Dawood
- Kitab A'lam al-Sunan fi Sharh Sahih al-Bukhari (The Book of Outstanding Examples from the Prophet Traditions: Explaining al-Bukhari's compendium "The Sound Prophet Traditions"), considered the earliest commentary on Sahih Bukhari.
- Kitab al-Uzlat (The Book of Seclusion)
- Gharib al-Hadith (The Difficult Meanings of Hadith), where Al-Dhahabi put on an equal length with Ibn Sallam and Ibn Qutayba's famous works regarding this difficult subject.
- Sharh al-Asma' a-Husna, where Al-Bayhaqi heavily relied on his al-Asma' wa al-Sifat.
- Al-Ikhtiyarat al-Fiqhiya, an early work in Islamic law.
- Ma'alim al-Sunan
- Kitab al-Ghunyah 'anil Kalam wa Ahlih
- Kitab Islah Ghalat al-Muhadithin
- Kitab al-Shujaj
- Kitab al-Jihad
- Risalat fi i'Jaz al-Qur'an
- Ilm al-Hadith

== See also ==
- List of Ash'aris

== Sources ==
=== Arabic ===
- Al-Dhahabi. سير أعلام النبلاء [Biographies of Noble Personalities]. islamweb.net (in Arabic).
- Yaqut al-Hamawi. معجم الأدباء [Dictionary of Learned Men]. islamport.com (in Arabic).
- 'Umar Rida Kahhala. معجم المؤلفين [Dictionary of Authors]. Shia Online Library (in Arabic).
- Isma'il Pasha al-Baghdadi [in Arabic]. هدية العارفين [The Gift of the Gnostics]. Shia Online Library (in Arabic).
- Al-Zirikli. الأعلام للزركلي [Eminent Personalities]. shamela.ws (in Arabic).
- Syrian Scholars Association. الإمام أبو سليمان الخطابي البستي [The Biography of Imam Abu Sulayman al-Khattabi]. islamsyria.com (in Arabic).

=== English ===
- Sebastian Günther (2008). "In our days, religion has once again become something alien: Al-Khattabi's Critique of the State of Religious Learning in Ten-century Islam". American Journal of Islamic Social Sciences. Vol. 25. International Institute of Islamic Thought (IIIT). pp. 3–30.
- Al-Bayhaqi (1999). Allah's Names and Attributes. Vol. 4 of Islamic Doctrines & Beliefs. Translated by Gibril Fouad Haddad. Islamic Supreme Council of America. pp. 22–23. ISBN 9781930409033.
- Encyclopedia of Sahih Al-Bukhari. Arabic Virtual Translation Center. 2022. p. 3165.
