= Al-Baqillani =

Muslim scholar and theologian (950–1013)

- ٱلْبَاقِلَّانِيّ
- Title: Shaikh as-Sunnah ("Shaykh of the Prophetic Way"), Lisān al-Ummah ("Voice of the Nation"), Imād ad-Dīn ("Pillar of the Religion"), Nāsir al-Islām ("Guardian of Islam"), and Saif as-Sunnah ("Sword of the Prophetic Way") ("Protector of Islam")

Personal life
- Born: Abu Bakr Muḥammad ibn al-Ṭayyib al-Bāqillānī; 338/950 CE Basra, Iraq
- Died: 403/1013 CE Baghdad, Iraq
- Main interest(s): Theology (Kalam), Usul al-Din, Tawhid, Logic, Islamic Jurisprudence, Hadith
- Notable work(s): Kitāb al-Tamhīd, Kitāb I'jaz al-Qur'ān

Religious life
- Religion: Islam
- Denomination: Sunni
- Jurisprudence: Maliki
- Creed: Ash'ari

Muslim leader
- Influenced by: Malik ibn Anas, Abu al-Hasan al-Ash'ari, Al-Daraqutni, Ibn Abi Zayd al-Qayrawani, Ibn Khafif
- Influenced: Abu al-Fadl al-Tamimi, Abu Dharr al-Harawi, Abu Imran al-Fasi, Qadi 'Abd al-Wahhab, Qadi Ayyad, Al-Suyuti, Al-Zarkashi

Abū Bakr Muḥammad ibn al-Ṭayyib al-Bāqillānī (Arabic: أَبُو بَكْر مُحَمَّد بْن ٱلطَّيِّب ٱلْبَاقِلَّانِيّ; 950 – 5 June 1013), was a Sunni Muslim scholar and polymath who specialized in speculative Islamic theology, jurisprudence, logic, and hadith. He spent much of his life defending and strengthening the Ash'ari school of theology within Islam. An accomplished rhetorical stylist and orator, al-Baqillani was held in high regard by his contemporaries for his expertise in debating theological and jurisprudential issues. Al-Dhahabi referred to him as "the learned imam, incomparable master, foremost of the scholars, author of many books, and example of articulateness and intelligence."

== Biography ==
Born in Basra in 330 AH / 950 CE, he spent most of his life in Baghdad, and studied theology under two disciples of Abu Hasan al-Ash'ari, Ibn Mujahid al-Ta'i and Abul-Hasan al-Bahili. He also studied jurisprudence under the Maliki scholar Ibn Abi Zayd and the Shāfiʿī scholar Abū ʿAbd Allāh al-Shīrāzī. After acquiring expertise in both Islamic theology and Maliki jurisprudence he expounded the teachings of the Ash'ari school, and taught Maliki jurisprudence in Baghdad.

He held the office of chief Qadi in Baghdad and in Ukbara, a town not far from the capital. Al-Baqillani became a popular lecturer, and took part in debates with well-known scholars of the day. Al-Baqillani was a hadith scholar, having studied under prominent hadith scholars such as Abu Bakr ibn Malik al-Qotaie, Abu Muhammad ibn Massi, and others, especially by al-Daraqutni, who was one of the leading hadith scholars at his time and who once kissed al-Baqillani's forehead (a sign of sincere respect) and said of him: "This is a man who will refute the allegations of people of false beliefs."

Because of his debating skill, the Amir 'Adud al-Dawla dispatched him as an envoy to the Byzantine court in Constantinople, where he debated Christian scholars in the presence of their king in 371/981. He debated and defeated multiple Christian theologians on matters pertaining to the differences between Islam and Christianity.

== Death ==
He died in 403 AH / 1013 CE. Following his death, Abu al-Fadl al-Tamimi, the leading Hanbali scholar and a close friend of al-Baqillani for seven years, attended the funeral barefoot, accompanied by a large delegation of Hanbali scholars. The funeral drew vast crowds. Al-Tamimi was chosen to deliver the proclamation, declaring:

"This is the Helper of the Sunnah and the religion! This is the leader of the Muslims! This is the defender of the Sharia! This is the one who authored seventy thousand pages!"

Due to his high standing and prestige, al-Baqillani was buried near the grave of Ahmad ibn Hanbal. Al-Baqillani's tomb remains a place where thousands visit until today where they seek the blessings of God's mercy upon him.

== Reception ==
Qadi Iyad said of al-Baqillani, "He is known as the sword of the sunna and spokesman of the community, who spoke the language of traditionists, strictly keeping firm to the beliefs, and was the head of the Maliki scholars of his time. His gatherings in Basra were huge."

Ibn Taymiyya called al-Baqillani "the best of the Ash'ari mutakallimun, unrivalled by any predecessor or successor".

Al-Khatib al-Baghdadi said, "Imam al-Baqillani's nightly devotions and worship consisted of 40 cycles of prayer whether at home or while he was travelling away, after which he would write about 35 pages of textual knowledge, after which he would pray dawn prayer, and then he would pass on his writings to others in his circle to read out loud for proof-readings, verifying, and editing the texts."

== Works ==
Fifty-five titles of works written by al-Baqillani have been listed, the great majority on legal and theological matters, and many written against his opponents.

- Al-Inṣāf fīmā Yajib I'tiqāduh
- I‘jāz al-Qur’ān (The Inimitability of the Qur'an)
- Al-Intiṣār lil-Qur’ān
- Al-Taqrīb wal-Irshād aṣ-Ṣaghīr
- Kitāb Tamhīd al-Awāʼil wa-Talkhīṣ ad-Dalāʼil (The Introduction)
- Manāqib al-A’immah al-Arba‘ah
- Fadl al-Jihad
- Hidayat al-Mustarshidin
- Al-Ibana an Ibtal Muzhab Ahle al-Kufr wal-Dalala (Exposition of the Invalidity of the School of the Disbelief and Misguidance)
- Al-Istishhad
- Al-Kuffar wal-Muta'awwilin wa-Hukm al-Dar
- Al-Mulal wal-Nihal
- Al-Tabyin fi Adab al-Jidal
- Al-Tadil wal-Tajrih

== Sources ==
- Zulfiqar Ayub (2 May 2015). THE BIOGRAPHIES OF THE ELITE LIVES OF THE SCHOLARS, IMAMS & HADITH MASTERS Biographies of The Imams & Scholars. pp. 152–153.
