= Al-Sunan al-Wusta =

Hadith book compiled by Al-Bayhaqi

- Author: Al-Bayhaqi
- Original title: السنن الوسطى
- Language: Arabic
- Subject: Shafi'i jurisprudence
- Genre: Hadith collection
- Published: Dar al-Kotob al-'Ilmiyya
- Publication date: 2010
- Publication place: Lebanon
- Pages: 4000
- ISBN: 2745114522

Al-Sunan al-Wusta, (Arabic: السنن الوسطى), or Marifat al-Sunan wa-al-Athar (Arabic: معرفة السنن والآثار) is a hadith work compiled by Imam al-Bayhaqi (384 AH – 458 AH). It is multi-volume book which provides a compilation of textual evidences for Shafi'i jurisprudence.

== Description ==
This work is regarded as one of the most significant contributions to the Shafi'i school. It systematically compiles the hadith evidence underpinning the madhhab, citing them from the Sahih and Sunan collections, while elucidating their chains of transmission (isnad), the rationale behind any weak reports, and the justification for al-Shafi'i reliance upon them when such reports were not fully authentic. The author also engages with and refutes opposing views, such as those of al-Tahawi from the Hanafi school.

Following the methodology of al-Bayhaqi, the book presents the positions of the tabi'un (the successors of the Companions) and subsequent scholars, including Abu Thawr, al-Hasan, and Ahmad. It is organized according to the arrangement of al-Muzani. At times, it cites earlier statements of al-Shafi'i, and it incorporates commentary on hadith authentication, biographical notes on scholars, and references to authoritative sources, such as al-Umm.

== Reception ==
Ibn al-Subki said: "No Shafi'i jurist can do without it," while his father, Taqi al-Din al-Subki said: "He meant by the title: Al-Shafi'i's Knowledge of the Sunnahs and Reports (Athar)."

A dream of al-Shafi'i carrying sections of this book in his hand occurred to one of the right-acting men when al-Bayhaqi was writing Ma'rifat as-Sunan wal-Athar. He was stating, "I have read them," or, alternatively, "I have written seven sections of the Book of the jurist Ahmad (al-Bayhaqi)."

== See also ==
- List of Sunni books
- List of hadith books
- Sunan al-Kubra
- Shu'ab al-Iman
