= Musnad Humaidi =

Hadith book attributed to Imam Al-Humaydi

- Author: Imam Al-Humaydi
- Original title: مسند الحميدي
- Language: Arabic
- Genre: Hadith collection

Musnad Humaidi or Musnad Humaydi (Arabic: مسند الحميدي), is one of the Hadith books attributed to Imam Al-Humaydi (d. 219 AH).

== Description ==
The book contains almost one thousand five hundred (1500) hadiths according to Maktaba Shamila. It is one of the oldest Musnad (a kind of Hadith book) written. It is written in second century of Islamic Calendar and written before the most authentic book of Hadiths (narrations of the Islamic prophet Muhammad) that are Sahihain (Sahih al-Bukhari & Sahih Muslim). The Musnad (مسند) are collections of Hadiths which are classified by narrators, and therefore by Sahabas (companions of Muhammad). The book contain Sahih (authentic), weak and fabricated narrations.

== Publications ==
The book has been published by many organizations around the world:

- Musnad Humaidi Urdu
- Al-Mirwiyat al-Haskiyya through Musnad al-Humaidi, Publisher: University of Anbar جامعة الانبار

== See also ==
- List of Sunni books
- Kutub al-Sittah
- Jami al-Tirmidhi
- Sunan Abu Dawood
- Jami' at-Tirmidhi
- Either: Sunan ibn Majah, Muwatta Malik
