= Sunan al-Kubra (al-Bayhaqi) =

Hadith book compiled by Al-Bayhaqi

Sunan al-Kubra lil Behaqi
- Author: Al-Bayhaqi
- Original title: ٱلسُّنَن ٱلْكُبْرَىٰ لِلْبَيْهَقِيّ
- Language: Arabic
- Genre: Hadith collection

Sunan al-Kubra lil Bayhaqi, (Arabic: ٱلسُّنَن ٱلْكُبْرَىٰ لِلْبَيْهَقِيّ), or Al-Sunan al-Kabir (Arabic: ٱلسُّنَن ٱلْكَبِير) is a prominent and massive multi-volume Hadith book compiled, edited and catalogued by Imam Al-Bayhaqi (384 AH – 458 AH).

== Description ==
It is the largest Sunan Book available in history of Hadith collection, containing almost twenty two thousand (22,000) Hadiths according to Al-Maktaba Al-Shamela. A book with similar name (Sunan al-Kubra) is also written by Imam al-Nasa'i having almost twelve thousand (12,000) hadiths.

It is one of the major hadith compilations by one of the last great hadith memorisers of the 4th century Hijri, of such importance that nothing of its like has been penned down. It is compiled in order of issue relating to fiqh. The author takes quite an effort in providing narrations in each chapter thereby giving the rulings of such transmissions and how certain scholars have understood it. He also expounds the problematic phrases and or terminologies that might cause misinterpretation as well as those that might seemingly portray contradictions. Many scholars have said that no such work has been penned down like the Sunan al-Kabir.

== Reception ==
Ibn al-Salah said in his Muqaddimah: "We know not its like in its field." In other words, it is the best of the Sunan works. Al-Nawawi said in al-Taqrib that one should be devoted to it, as nothing has been written like it, and Al-Suyuti, commenting on this statement in Tadrib al-Rawi, agreed. Al-Sakhawi said in Fath al-Mughith that one must not limit oneself from it (by sufficing with the other sunan works of Abu Dawud, al-Nasa’i, and al-Tirmidhi) due to its comprehensiveness in most of the ahadith al-ahkam. Al-Sakhawi further added that its true rank is only after the Sahihayn of al-Bukhari and Muslim, coming before the sunan of Abu Dawud, al-Nasa'i, and al-Tirmidhi, which take precedence only by merit of being earlier and thus with shorter chains.

Al-Dhahabi said there is nothing like it and considered it to be one of the four masterpieces a scholar cannot do without, alongside al-Muhalla by Ibn Hazm, al-Mughni by Ibn Qudamah, and al-Tamhid by Ibn Abd al-Barr. Taj al-Din al-Subki said no other book had been written with such classification, arrangement, and elegance.

== See also ==
- List of Sunni books
- Shu'ab al-Iman
- Al-Sunan al-Wusta
