= Yanabi al-Muwadda =

Yanabi al-Muwadda is a hadith collection purportedly authored in Baghdad in 1395 AH by Sulaiman ibn Khawajah Killan Ibrahim ibn Baba Khawajah al-Balkhi al-Qunduzi al-Hanafi, a Sunni scholar. It is book that explains importance of love of the ahly bait of Muhammad, specially Imam Ali ibn Abu talib. It quotes from Mawaddat al-Qurba Book of Mir Sayyid Ali Hamadani.
