= Abdallah ibn al-Zubayr al-Humaydi =

Islamic scholar and Shaykh of al-Haram

Al-Humaydi الحميدي

Personal life
- Born: Abbasid Caliphate
- Died: 834 /219 AH Mecca, Abbasid Caliphate
- Resting place: Mecca
- Era: Islamic Golden Age (Abbasid era)
- Region: Abbasid Caliphate
- Main interest(s): Islamic Jurisprudence, Islamic Theology
- Occupation: Islamic Jurisprudence scholar and Shaykh of the al-Haram

Religious life
- Religion: Islam
- Denomination: Sunni
- Jurisprudence: Shafi'i
- Arabic name
- Personal (Ism): ʻAbd Allāh عبد الله
- Patronymic (Nasab): ibn al-Zubayr ibn ‘Isa ibn ‘Ubayd allah ibn Usamah ibn Abd Allah ibn Hamid; بن الزبير بن عيسى بن عبيد الله بن أسامة بن عبد الله بن حميد بن زهير بن الحارث بن أسد بن عبد العزى
- Teknonymic (Kunya): Abū Bakr أبو بكر
- Toponymic (Nisba): Al-Ḥumaydī; Al-Makki; al-Qurashi; al-Asadī

Al-Humaydi (Note: Arabic: الحميدي, romanized: al-Ḥumaydī) (died 834) was a Shafi'i. jurisprudence scholar and Shaykh of the al-Haram. He studied under Imam Shafi'i himself in his majlis.

== Teachers and students ==
He also studied and narrated hadith from Sufyan ibn Uyainah and Fudhail ibn Iyadh. His pupils included Al-Aimah such as Al-Bukhari, An-Nasa'i, At-Turmudhi, Abu Zur'a al-Razi and Abu Hatim al-Razi. He died in Mecca in 219 AH.

== Works ==
Some of his works are:

- Musnad al-Humaydi (المسند); 22749563 his major work.
- Uṣūl al-Sunnah (أصول السنة), 49543296
- Ar-Radd ‘Ala an-Nu’man (Refutation of Abu Hanifa)
- At-Tafsir
- Ad-Dala’il
