= Ibn Manda =

10th-century Persian Hadith scholar

Personal life
- Born: 310–1 A.H/ 922 C.E
- Died: 395 A.H/1004–5 C.E
- Main interest: Hadith
- Notable work: Kitāb ma’rifat al-sahāba

Religious life
- Religion: Islam
- Jurisprudence: Hanbali
- Creed: Athari

Abū ʿAbdullāh Muḥammad bin Isḥāq Ibn Manda (d. 395/1004–5) was an eminent Isfahani Sunni Hadith scholar of Persian origin.

== Overview of the Ibn Manda Family ==
In classical hadīth literature, the name "Ibn Manda" may refer to various individuals from a famous Iṣfahānī family dynasty of ḥadīt̲h̲ scholars and historians which was active for nearly three centuries. The family descended from a Sassanian official, D̲j̲ahārbuk̲h̲t, said to have become a Muslim at the time of the Islamic Conquest of Persia, while the man after whom the family was named was Ibrāhīm (Manda) b. al-Walīd b. Sanda b. Buṭṭa b. Ustandār al-Fērōzān b. D̲j̲ahārbuk̲h̲t. His death is placed during the caliphate of al-Mutasim. His son, Abū Zakariyyāʾ Yaḥyā, is counted as the first prominent scholar in the family. Two sons of Yahya are known, Abd al-Rahmān (d. 320/932) and Muhammad (d. 301/913-14). Muhammad's son Ishāq (d. 341/953) was the father of the most renowned member of the family, Abu ‘Abdullāh Muhammad b. Ishāq Ibn Manda, who was born in 310/922.

Abū 'Abdullāh Ibn Mandah was focussed on attaining religious education since his childhood and went on to receive instructions from venerable scholars as Ja'fer b. Muhammad ibn Musa `Alawi, Ahmad b. Zakariyya Maqdisi, `Abdullah b. Ahmad b. Hanbal and Ibn Hibban (d. 965). His travels are said to have spanned a period of thirty years and took him to places such as Marw, Bukhara, Egypt, Tarāblus, Nisapur and Mecca. He collected an extraordinary amount of hadith in his travels during which he supposedly encountered 1,700 shuyūkh (teachers) and returned to Isfahān with roughly forty loads of books. The Imām Abu Ishāq ibn Hamzah commented that he did not find a peer among scholars of the stature of Ibn Mandah. The Sheikh of Herat, Isma`il Ansari (d. 375 A.H) said that Ibn Mandah was the chief scholar of his age.

== Legacy ==
Ibn Manda married late in life and had four sons, ‘Abdallah (d. 1070), ‘Abdal-Rahmān (d. 1078), ‘Abdal-Wahhāb (d. 475/1082) and the little known ‘Abdal-Rahīm. Some of Abū Abdullāh's notable students were Al-Hakim Nishapuri and Ibn Mardaway (Mardūya) (323-410/935-1019). Abu-Abdullāh died in Dhu'l-Hijja in 395 A.H (September 1005 CE). What follows is a list of some of the individual scholars associated with the Ibn Manda family:

- Abū Zakariyya, Yahyā ibn Manda (great-grandfather)
- Muhammad ibn Yahya ibn Mandah (d. 301 AH: 914 CE) (grandfather)
- Ishāq ibn Muhammad ibn Yahya ibn Mandah (d. 341 AH: 952 CE) (father)
- Abū Abdullah, Muhammad ibn Ishāq ibn Muhammad ibn Yahya ibn Mandah (310–395 AH: 922–1005 CE)
- Abu l-Qasim, ‘Abdal Rahman b. Muhammad b. Ishaq (381–470 AH: 991–1078 CE) (son). He traveled to Baghdad in 406/1015, and visited Wāsit, Mecca, Nishapur, Hamadhān and so on. He started teaching in 407/1016 and authored many works, among them, it seems, a History of Mecca. He was praised for his staunch orthodoxy and uncompromising stand against "innovators".
- Abū Zakariyyā’, Yahyā ibn ‘Abdal Wahhab ibn Mandah (b. 434–511 AH/1043-1118 CE) (grandson). He enjoyed a lasting reputation as a historian. His History of Isfahan may have been based on that of his grandfather, and the latter’s list of sahāba who lived 120 years may have been remade by him. The scholarly activity and renown of the family appear to have come to an end at this point.

== Academic works ==
His academic publications were primarily concerned history, biography and hadīth. He wrote on the history (seerah) of the Prophet Muhammad and, like his grandson, Yahyā b. ‘Abdal-Wahhāb, composed a History of Isfahan. Of his works there survive his comments on certain verses of the Quran and some prophetic traditions, under the title of ar-Radd ' ala al-Jahmiyya (Refutation of the Jahmites), but it may be noted that his son, ‘Abdal-Rahmān, is credited with a similar if, apparently different work. Other additional works include at-Tawhīd wa-Ma’rifat Asmā’ Allah and parts of his Ma’rifat al-sahāba, which are both preserved in Damascus, and a treatise on "The men around Muhammad who lived 120 years’.

== Dispute with Abu Nu'aym ==
Ibn Manda is reported to have been involved in a vicious dispute with his fellow ‘Muhaddith of the Age" and hometown rival, Abu Nu’aym al-Isfahani (d. 1039), due to their differences in madhhab and theological contentions. He denounced Abu Nu’aym on account of his supposed leanings toward kalām and banished him from the great congregational mosque of Isfahān, which was then dominated by Ibn Manda's Hanbali faction. Nevertheless, Ibn Manda taught hadīth to, and had an extremely close teacher-pupil relationship with, Abū Mansur Ma’mar ibn Ahmad al-Isfahānī (d. 1027), who was a prominent Hanbali Sufi and contemporary of Abu Nu’aym in Isfahan who praised Ibn Manda as the model scholar of his age.

== See also ==
- List of Islamic scholars
