= Musnad al-Siraj =

- Author: Muhammad bin Ishaq As Siraj Al Nishapori
- Original title: مسند السراج
- Language: Arabic
- Genre: Hadith collection

Musnad al-Siraj (Arabic: مسند السراج), is one of the Hadith books compiled by Imam Muhammad bin Ishaq As Siraj Al Nishapori (Died 313 AH).

== Description ==
The book contains almost seven thousand hadiths according to Maktaba Shamila. The Musnad (مسند) are collections of Hadiths which are classified by narrators, and therefore by Sahabas (companions of the Islamic prophet Muhammad). This is the book famous mostly among scholars.

== Publications ==
The book has been published by many organizations around the world:

- Musnad Al-Siraj: Published: Millat Publication, Pakistan

== See also ==
- List of Sunni books
- Kutub al-Sittah
