= Shu'ab al-Iman =

Book by Al-Bayhaqi

Shuab al-Iman
- Author: Al-Bayhaqi
- Original title: شعب الايمان
- Language: Arabic
- Genre: Hadith collection

Shuʿab al-Īmān, (Arabic: شعب الايمان), "The Branches of Faith", is a multi-volume Hadith book compiled by Imam al-Bayhaqi (384 AH – 458 AH). The author provides an exhaustive textual commentary relating to foundations of faith and its branches.

== Description ==
It is one of the major collection of Hadiths compiled by Imam Behaqi besides his other major work in the field of Hadiths. According to Al-Maktaba Al-Shamela it contains almost eleven thousand (11000) hadiths (narrations). This book describes branches of faith (Shuʿab al-Īmān). The author chose the title of the book based on a hadith of Muhammad in which he mentioned that there are more than seventy branches of faith. According to the book, īmān (faith) has three major branches, as follows:

- 'Iman bil Qalb' (Testimony by Heart of all the Essentials of Iman): It refers to the states of one's ‘Qalb’ (Heart) including the ‘Niyyah’ (Intentions), ‘Aqāʾid’ (Doctrines), and other deeds of the heart. This entirely depends upon a person's ‘Baṭin’ (Hidden) states.
- 'Iman bi-l-Lisan' (Testimony by Tongue of all the essentials of Iman): It refers to the confirmation of all the essentials of Islam and adhering to them through one's ‘Lisān’ (Tongue). In other words, it is ‘Ẓāhir’ (Apparent) in one's life, reflects the state of one's heart and generates through the tongue.
- 'Īmān bi-l-aʿmāl' (Testimony by Actions of all the essentials of Iman): It refers to one's deeds (aʿmāl) and is also ‘Ẓāhir’ (Apparent), and is also a reflection of one's heart but generates from one's deeds and actions.

== Publications ==
Several publishers have published the book in different langues (original book is in Arabic):

- 'Shuab ul-Iman': Published: Book on Demand (1 Jan. 1901)
- 'Shu‘ab al-īmān (9 v.) by Bayhaqī, Aḥmad ibn al-Ḥusayn' : Published: Bayrūt : Dār al-Kutub al-‘Ilmīyah, 2008.
- ' al-Jami' li Shu'ab al-Iman 15 VOLUMES (الجَامِعُ لِشُعَبْ الإِيمَان) by Imam al-Bayhaqi': Published: PUBLISHED: Ministry of Religious Endowment of Qatar / Dar al-Salafiyyah | Mumbai, India (2008)
- ' Shuab -Ul- Iman -Urdu- by Imam Bayhaqi (R.A)': Published: Nobel Press

== See also ==
- List of Sunni books
- Sunan al-Kubra
- Al-Sunan al-Wusta
