= Al-Asma' wa al-Sifat =

11th-century literary work by Al-Bayhaqi

- Edited by Anas Muhammad Adnān al-Sharafāwi, with commentaries by Muhammad Zahid al-Kawthari, and foreword by Muhammad 'Awwamah
- Author: Al-Bayhaqi
- Language: Arabic
- Subject: Aqidah, Hadith, Kalam
- Publisher: Dar al-Taqwa, Damascus

Al-Asma' wa al-Sifat (Arabic: الأسماء والصفات, romanized: Divine Names and Attributes) is a classic and foundational Islamic theological treatise authored by the renowned Shafi'i hadith master al-Bayhaqi. The work reflects al-Bayhaqi’s approach to early Islamic scholarship, with an emphasis on following the interpretations of the first generations of Muslims (salaf). It serves as a comprehensive textual reference, organizing over 1,000 documented sources, including Quranic verses and prophetic traditions, to provide evidence for God’s attributes. The treatise is characterized by its methodology of tanzih (transcendence), affirming God’s attributes as described in revelation while explicitly rejecting anthropomorphism (tashbih) and absolute negation (ta'til). By leveraging his authority in hadith, al-Bayhaqi seeks to demonstrate the scriptural basis for the traditional understanding of the Divine.

== Content ==
Al-Bayhaqi was primarily a student of Hadith rather than a speculative theologian, despite being recognised as an Ash'arite theologian. This made his defence of Ash'arism extremely valuable because he was universally accepted as a preeminent authority in Hadith. His 'Book of Names and Attributes' consists largely of quotations directly from the Quran and Hadith, accompanied by Athar (sayings of the pious predecessors) for further illustration. He demonstrates through textual evidence that the Ash'ari creed is in line with the beliefs of the early Muslims. Despite the book largely being a compilation of narrations. Michel Allard's thorough analysis has demonstrated, his exposition is grounded in a number of rational premises, which elevates the book to the status of a theological work. In that he not only provides transmission but also clarification and elaboration on difficult points of certain narrations he presents.

Al-Bayhaqi, in the Ash'arite tradition, acknowledged the difference between the essential and active attributes, but he primarily guided a middle path between sects who indulge in two extreme methodologies namely those who engage in extreme literalism that liken God with his creation (tashbih) and those that engage in extreme figurativeness by distorting the meaning (tahrif), negating the distinct attributes (ta'til) and rejecting authentic prophetic traditions. To put it another way, the names of God that are duly attested in the sources signify real existing attributes, such as Alim (knowing) and Ilm (knowledge), but it is inappropriate to perceive them in a literal material sense or in an entirely metaphorical sense. All of this holds true when referring to God using terms like Yad (hand), Wajih (face) and Ayn (eye). Of the Ash'arites in this non-speculative line, al-Bayhaqi stands out as the most significant representative.

== Divine attribute of laughter ==
In one example of Al-Bayhaqi's massive compilation of anthropomorphic traditions (Al-Asma' wa al-Sifat), he dedicated an entire chapter on ahadith that mention the divine 'Laughter'. Al-Bayhaqi narrates that Al-Bukhari said regarding the hadith, "Allah laughs at two men, one of them kills the other and both of them enter Paradise", that laughing is interpreted as "mercy" meaning "Allah shows mercy to both of them". Al-Bayhaqi further expands on this through his mastery of the Arabic language and explains that the laughter means "revealing" and "uncovering" based on the classical Arabic language: "The Bedouins: say 'the earth laughs when the plants grow', because the earth reveals the beauty of the plants and uncovers the flowers". According to al-Bayhaqi, God did not literally laugh but revealed his benevolence.

In spite of al-Bayhaqi's textual proof and linguistic support for the interpretation of the divine laughter. Al-Bayhaqi presents a different viewpoint on how the bulk of early Muslims handled the unclear ahadiths (attributes) by doing tafwid (relegating the meaning to Allah). Al-Bayhaqi states:

The ancients (salaf) from our school were inspired by these Hadiths to awaken [in themselves and in their disciples] the ambition to do good deeds and works, and [to contemplate] on God's grace. They were not preoccupied with interpreting God's laughter. [This was] in conformity with their conviction that God does not possess body organs and articulators. It is impossible to describe Him as baring His teeth or opening His mouth.

== Reception ==
Al-Dhahabi said: "Nothing like it has been transmitted."

Ibn al-Subki highly praised this book and said: “I do not know anything that compares to it.”
