= Tuhaf al-Uqul =

Hadith book by Ibn Shu'bah

Tuhaf al-Uqul (Arabic: تُحَفُ العُقول في ما جاءَ مِنَ الحِکَمِ وَ المَواعِظَ مِن آلِ الرَّسول, romanized: Tuḥaf al-ʿuqūl fī mā jāʾa min al-ḥikam wa l-mawāʿiẓ min āl al-rasūl, lit. The Masterpieces of the Mind in What Came of Wisdom and Exhortations from the Family of the Messenger) is a hadith book written by Abu Muhammad al-Hasan bin Ali bin al-Husayn bin Shu’ba al-Harrani. He was one of the Shia Islam scholars in the fourth century of Hijrah (4th Century A.H, 11th Century CE)

== The Author ==
Abu Mohammed al-Hasan bin Ali bin al-Husain ibn Shu’ba al-Harrani also known as Ibn Shu’bah is one of the Shia scholars who lived in the fourth century of Hijrah. He was the contemporary of Ibn Babawayh and one of the masters of al-Shaykh al-Mufid. He was born in Harran, which is one of the towns around Aleppo in Syria.

== The aim of the writing ==
The author expounds that his aim of writing this book is to enable access to teachings of Muhammad and Imams about morality, spirituality, and wisdom, which had not received due attention by other Shia scholars.

== The content of the book ==
Tuhaf al-Uqul contains many hadiths of prophets and messengers of Islam and Shia Imams except Muhammad al-Mahdi.

Some of the topics that came in the book are:

- The Muhammad wills for Ali and Muadh ibn Jabal
- Speeches of the prophet of Islam in the farewell pilgrimage
- The letters and wills of Ali for Hasan ibn Ali and Hussain ibn Ali
- Order to Malik al-Ashtar
- Risalah al-Huquq

== The position of the book and its author in the others views ==
Tuhaf al-Uqul and Ibn Shu'bah have been commended by another Shia scholars. Muhammad Baqir Majlesi and Sheikh Abdul Hosein Amini are some of the scholars that commend this book and its author in their works. Also, this book has been much respected among Alawites. However, while admitting to grace and great God-wariness of Ibn Shu'bah, Abu al-Qasim al-Khoei has considered Tuhaf al-Uqul as not reliable in Fiqh discussion because Ibn Shu’bah has omitted all references of hadiths.

== See also ==
- Kitab al-Kafi
- List of Shia books
