= A Great Collection of Fabricated Traditions =

Book by Abu'l-Faraj ibn al-Jawzi

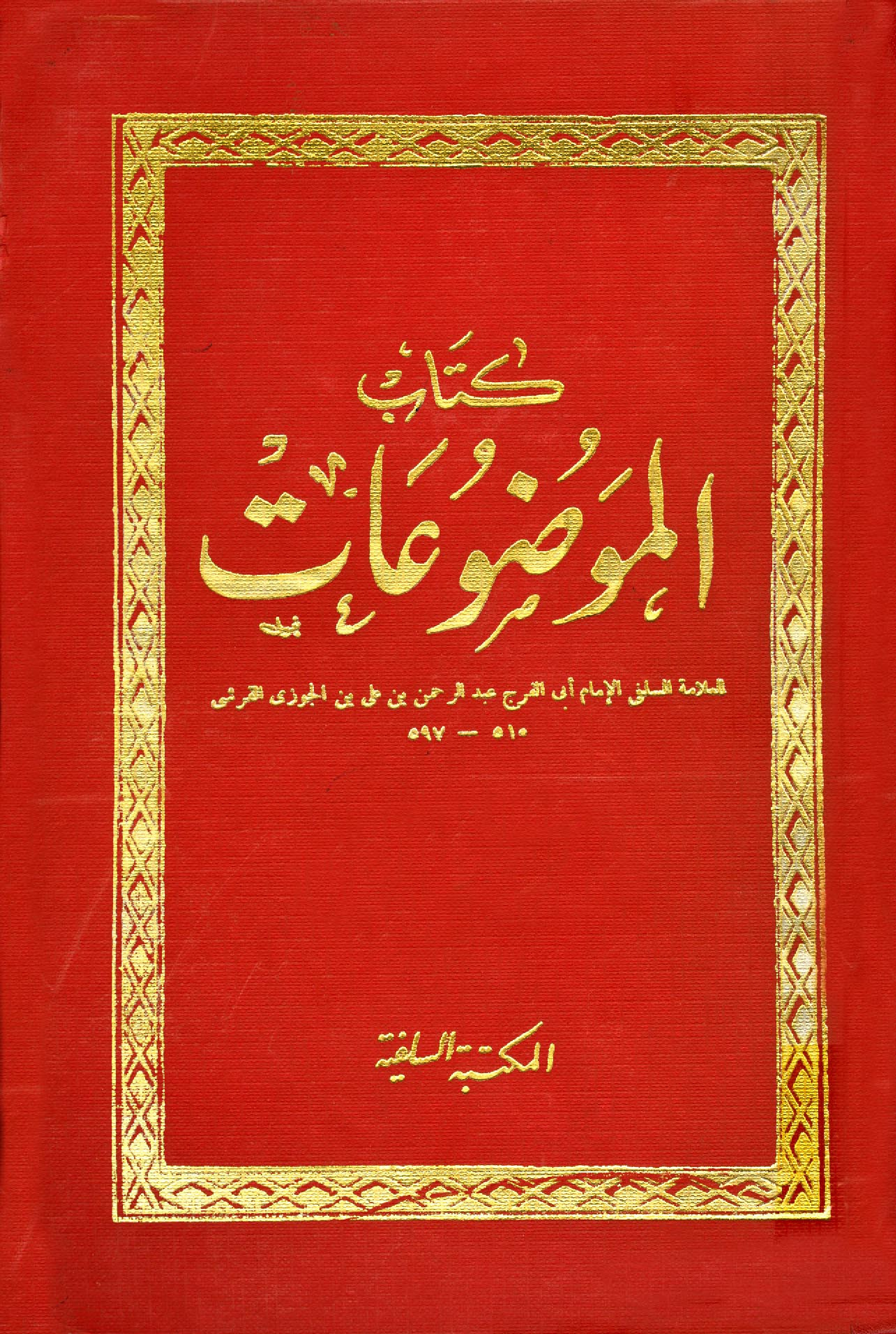
- Author: Abu'l-Faraj ibn al-Jawzi
- Original title: الموضوعات الكبرى
- Subject: Fabricated traditions
- Genre: Hadith collection

A Great Collection of Fabricated Traditions, (Arabic: الموضوعات الكبرى, romanized: Al-Mawḍū‘āt al-Kubrā), is a collection of fabricated hadith collected by Abu'l-Faraj ibn al-Jawzi (d.1201) for criticism.

== Description ==
The book consists of narrations, presented as hadith, declared fabricated (mawḍūʻ) by the author and then arranged by subject. Al-Mawdu'at has been described by Al-Nawawi as including many narrations, occupying approximately two volumes. It consists of some 1847 narrations according to the numbering provided in the latest edition and is currently published in four volumes with ample footnotes providing additional information.

== Criticism ==
Al-Nawawi (d.1277) criticized the book as containing many hadith which cannot properly be declared mawḍūʻ. Some of them are, according to Al-Suyuti, ḍa‘īf, ḥasan or even ṣaḥīḥ.

Ahmad ibn Ali Ibn Hajar al-Asqalani (d.1449) contends, however, that the majority of the narrations in this book are fabricated and that those narrations criticized as not being fabricated are very few in comparison.
