= Tahdhib al-Athar =

Collection of Hadith by al-Tabari

Tahdhīb al-Āthār
- Author: Muhammad ibn Jarir al-Tabari
- Original title: تهذيب الآثار
- Language: Arabic
- Genre: Hadith collection

Tahdhīb al-Āthār (Arabic: تهذيب الآثار) is a collection of hadith by Muhammad ibn Jarir al-Tabari. Al-Kattani described it as one of al-Tabari's amazing works, although, he did not complete it.

== Description ==
Al-Tabari compiled this work as inclusive of hadith, an examination of their authenticity, and the explanation of each. He arranged his work according to the companion narrating it, beginning with Abu Bakr al-Siddiq. He completed the hadith of the ten companions promised paradise, Ahl al-Bayt and their clients, as well as a large segment of ʿAbd Allāh ibn ʿAbbās's hadith.

Al-Tabari gathered those hadith he determined to be authentic from each of these companions and discussed the various routes of their individual hadith and any hidden defects. He then discussed the understanding of each hadith, the differing opinions of the scholars and their rationale, and the definitions of any unusual terminology. He died in 922 before completing it.

Al-Kattani praised Tahdhib as being from the author's amazing works.

== Published Editions ==
The book has been published by many times by different publishes:

- Tahdhib al-Athar wa Tafsil al-Thabit 'an Rasul Allah min al-Akhbar. Edited by Mahmoud Muhammad Shakir. Cairo: Al-Madani Press, 2 volumes.

== See also ==
- List of Sunni books
- Kutub al-Sittah
- Sahih Muslim
- Sahih al-Tirmidhi
- Sunan Abu Dawood
- Either: Sunan ibn Majah, Muwatta Imam Malik
