= Al-Mustadrak ala al-Sahihayn =

Hadith collection by Hakim al-Nishaburi

Al-Mustadrak ala aṣ-Ṣaḥeeḥayn
- Author: Hakim al-Nishapuri
- Language: Arabic
- Subject: المستدرك على الصحيحين
- Genre: Hadith collection

Al-Mustadrak 'ala al-Sahihayn (Arabic: المستدرك على الصحيحين) or Mustadrak Al Hakim (Arabic: مستدرك الحاكم) is a five volume hadith collection written by Hakim al-Nishapuri (Nishapur is located in Iran). He wrote it in the year AH 393 (1002–1003 CE), when he was 72 years old.

== Description ==
It contains 9045 hadith. He claimed all hadith in it were authentic according to the conditions of either Sahih al-Bukhari or Sahih Muslim or both.

== Authenticity ==
The statement of authenticity was not accepted by a number of prominent later Sunni scholars. Al-Dhahabi, a 14th century Sunni Shafi'i Islamic scholar made an abridged version of the collection named Talkhis al-Mustadrak where he commented on its authenticity. It has become the habit of scholars today working in the field of hadîth, when compiling them and determining their authenticity, to say things like "It is authenticated by al-Hâkim and al-Dhahabî concurs". In doing so, they are referring to al-Dhahabi's Talkhîs, his abridgement of the Mustadrak that is often published along with it in its margins.

Dhahabi also wrote:

The Mustadrak contains a good number of hadîth that conform to the conditions of authenticity of both (al-Bukhârî and Muslim) as well as a number of hadîth conforming to the conditions of either one of them. Perhaps the total number of such hadîth comprises half the book. There is roughly another quarter of the hadîth that have authentic chains of transmission, but that have something else about them or that have some defect. As for the rest, and that is about a fourth, they are rejected and spurious narrations that are unauthentic. Some of those are fabrications. I came to know of them when I prepared an abridgement of the Mustadrak and pointed them out.

al-Dhahabi lamented:

It would have been better if al-Hakim had never compiled it."

Ibn Hajar al-Asqalani, a 15th century Sunni Islamic scholar states that Mawdu'at al-Kubra is as unreliable in its attributing the grade of being "forged" to certain ahadith as al-Hakim's Mustadrak is unreliable in its declaring the grade of "sound" or Sahih to many ahadith.

== Defence on the Author ==
The Hanafi Muḥaddith of Syria, Shaykh Nur al-Din 'Itr said: "It's pointed out that al-Hakim compiled it in his old age, intending to revise it, which he did not do beyond the first volume. This is proved by the fact that Al-Hakim's mistakes are imperceptible in the first volume of the Mustadrak, as confirmed by al-Dhahabi's own minimal corrections."

Ibn Hajar al-Asqalani said: “Al-Hakim was lenient in his authenticity of Hadiths, because he wrote the first draft of his book and when he started revising it, he died suddenly, or for other reasons.”

Sheikh Mahmud Mamduh defends Al-Hakim: "Outside of the Mustadrak his positions are as strict as those of any of the meticulous and strict Imams of Hadith"

== Abridgment ==
The five volumes of Al-Mustadrak alaa al-Sahihain

Talkhis al-Mustadrak' is an abridged version of Al-Mustadrak alaa al-Sahihain, written by al-Dhahabi. Al-Dhahabi in his Talkhis al-Mustadrak made an abridged version (a version with omitted material of the collection where he commented on its claimed authenticity). In that version, he added his comments on 1182 hadith. Al-Dhahabî in his encyclopedic Târikh al-Islam "The History of Islam" says the following in his biographical entry on al-Hâkim, wherein he speaks about his Mustadrak: "Some of those are fabrications. I came to know of them when I prepared an abridgement of the Mustadrak and pointed them out." Al-Dhahabî said of it: "It is a useful book. I had made an abridgement of it that is in considerable need of work and editing."

On at least three other occasions, al-Dhahabi criticised hadith he had not commented on in his Talkhîs. For example, when speaking about Mu`âwiyah b. Sâlih, he writes: "He is among those narrators whom Muslim accepts but not al-Bukhârî. You can see al-Hâkim relating this narrator's hadîth in his Mustadrak and say: 'This is according to the conditions of al-Bukhârî.' He repeatedly makes this mistake." However, when the same statement comes up in his Talkhîs, he says nothing about it .

There have been many prominent scholars who have assumed that al-Dhahabî's silence in his Talkhîs indicates his tacit approval of al-Hâkim's ruling, scholars of the caliber of al-Suyuti in al-Nukat al-Badî`ât (197) (15th century CE), al-Manâwî in Fayd al-Qadîr, and al-Husaynî in al-Bayân wa al-Ta`rîf. Many contemporary scholars follow this view as well, but some question that stance.

== See also ==
- List of Sunni books
- Kutub al-Sittah
- Sahih Muslim
- Sahih al-Tirmidhi
- Sunan Abu Dawood
- Either: Sunan ibn Majah, Muwatta Malik
