= Al-Hakim al-Nishapuri =

Muslim scholar and traditionist (933–1014)

Imam Shaykh al-Islam Al-Hakim al-Nishapuri
- الحكيم النيشابور
- Title: Al-Hakim; Shaykh al-Muhaddithin

Personal life
- Born: Nishapur, 3 March 933 CE (3 Rabi'-ul-Awwal 321 AH)
- Died: Nishapur, 1 September 1014 CE (3 Safar 405 AH)
- Era: Islamic golden age
- Main interest(s): Hadith, History
- Notable work(s): Mustadrak al-Hakim, History of Nishapur
- Occupation: Muhaddith, Scholar

Religious life
- Religion: Islam
- Denomination: Sunni
- Jurisprudence: Shafi'i
- Creed: Ash'ari

Muslim leader
- Influenced by: Al-Shafi'i Abu al-Hasan al-Ash'ari Al-Khattabi Ibn Hibban Al-Daraqutni Al-Halimi
- Influenced: Al-Bayhaqi Abu Nu'aym al-Isfahani Al-Qushayri Muhammad bin Husayn al-Sulami Ibn Asakir Ibn al-Salah

Abu Abd Allah Muhammad ibn Abd Allah al-Hakim al-Nishapuri (Persian: أبو عبد الله محمد بن عبد الله الحاكم النيسابوري; 933 - 1014 CE), also known as Ibn al-Bayyiʿ, was a Persian Sunni scholar and the leading traditionist of his age, frequently referred to as the "Imam of the Muhaddithin" or the "Muhaddith of Khorasan." He is widely renowned for his expertise in Hadith criticism, and regarded as the Sheikh of Hadith masters at his time. Al-Daraqutni, considered Al-Hakim to be superior in the science of Hadith than Ibn Manda.

== Biography ==
Al-Hakim from Nishapur took narrations from 2000 thousand scholars of authority from Khorasan, Transoxiana, Iraq, Persia and other places leading him to have the highest sanad (chains of transmission) in both Iraq and Khorazan. Amongst the leading and renowned hadith masters who Al-Hakim narrated from were his own teachers Ibn Hibban, Al-Khattabi, Al-Daraqutni and Al-Halimi. He had plenty of students who transmitted hadith from him and they include Al-Bayhaqi (foremost pupil), Abu Nu'aym al-Isfahani, Al-Qushayri, Muhammad bin Husayn al-Sulami and others. Al-Hakim is from the second generation of the Ash'ari school of theology, having taken his creed directly from the immediate students of Imam Al-Ash'ari, the most prominent one being Abu Salh Al-Suluki. Al-Hakim studied under a number of Sufi masters that taught him the science of Tasawwuf with the most prominent one being Sheikh Abu Amr Bin Nuja.

== Incident ==
A famous incident happened with the world's most famous Hadith master (Al-Hakim) and the worlds most famous poet named Abu al-Fadl Hamadhani.

It is narrated that a certain poet and a man of letters named, Abu al-Fadl Hamadhani came to Al-Hakim al-Nishapuri. After some time he had a group of followers named a title of praise, Badi al Zaman (Wonder of The Age), after which he became infatuated with himself, obsessed and proud. The reason for his praise was that when he heard someone recite 100 verses of poetry, he was able to memorize the poem and began reciting it backwards all the way to the beginning, which made the people of Nishapur fanaticized with him. After al-Hamadhani heard people praising al-Hākim saying: "So and so, the memorizer of Hadith...." he made a derogative comment about memorizing the isnads of Hadith. When Imam Al-Hakim heard of this, he sent a book of Hadiths and challenged him to memorize it entirely in a week. After a week, al-Hamadhani, returned the book back to Al-Hakim saying, "who can memorize this? Muhammed son of so-and-so, Jafar son of so-and-so reported from so-and-so!? It is filled with all sorts of different names and terms!" Imam Al-Hakim replied to him, "Then know your limits. And understand that to memorize the likes of this, is beyond your sphere."

== Death ==
On the 3rd of Safar 405 al-Hakim went into the bath, came out after bathing, said, "Ah," and died wearing but a waist-cloth before he had time to put on a shirt. Later, one of al-Hakim's students, Al-Hasan ibn Ash`ath al-Qurashî said: "I saw al-Hâkim in my dream riding a horse in a handsome appearance and saying: 'Salvation.' I asked him: `Al-Hakim! In what?' He replied: 'Writing hadith.'" His funeral prayer was led by Abu Bakr al-Hiri, Qadi (judge) of Nishapur.

== Legacy ==
Shah Waliullah stated that:

A mujaddid appears at the end of every century: The mujaddid of the 1st century was Imam of Ahlul Sunnah, Umar bin Abdul Aziz. The mujaddid of the 2nd century was Imam of Ahlul Sunnah Muhammad Idrees Shafi'i. The mujaddid of the 3rd century was Imam of Ahlul Sunnah Abu Hasan Ash'ari. The mujaddid of the 4th century was Abu Abdullah Hakim Nishapuri.

The Shafi'i hadith specialist Ibn al-Salah honours al-Hakim as one of the 'seven compilers of useful compilations' who has the distinction of being one of the few men to have compiled significant works in all three genres of hadith literature.

The Shafi'i historian al-Dhahabi calls him "The great hafiz and Imam (leader) of the traditionists (hadith scholars)".

Abu Hazim relates that Imam Al-Hakim in his time was peerless in the sciences of Hadith. His fame became rapidly widespread from east to west during his lifetime and establishing himself as one of the greatest scholars.

Despite this, he had been accused of being a Shi'a, but al-Subki stoutly denies this. He rejects the label of Shi`i as baseless because Ibn Asakir includes al-Hakim among the Asharis, who consider the Shias as innovators. Others noted to al-Hakim's sincerity in narrating hadith as the first hadith al-Hâkim narrated is:

May Allah make radiant the face of one who heard one of my sayings and then carried it to others. It may be that one carries understanding without being a person of understanding; it may be that one carries understanding to someone who possesses more understanding than he.

== Student ==
Fatemeh Daqaq Neyshabouri was one the famous student of him.

== Works ==
Al-Hakim reputedly said: "I drank water from Zamzam Well and asked Allah (God), The Glorified - for excellence in writing books. After this, he began authoring the following books and many others:

- Al-Mustadrak ala al-Sahihayn ("Supplement for What is Missing From al-Bukhârî and Muslim")
- Tarikh Nishapur ("History of Nishapur")
- Al-Abwâb ("The Chapters")
- Al-Amâlî ("The Dictations")
- Amâlî al-`Ashiyyât ("Night Dictations")
- Fadâ'il al-Shâfi`î ("The Immense Merits of al-Shâfi`î")
- Fawâ'id al-Nusakh ("Benefits of the Copies")
- Fawâ'id al-Khurâsâniyyîn ("Benefits of the People of Khurâsân")
- Al-Iklîl fî Dalâ'il al-Nubuwwa ("The Diadem: The Marks of Prophethood")
- Al-`Ilal ("The Defects of Hadîth")
- Mâ Tafarrada bi Ikhrâjihi Kullu Wâhidin min al-Imâmayn ("Reports Found Only in al-Bukhârî or Only in Muslim")
- Al-Madkhal ilâ `Ilm al-Sahîh ("Introduction to the Science of Sound Reports")
- Ma`rifat Anwâ` `Ulûm al-Hadîth ("Knowledge of the Different Types of the Hadîth Sciences")
- Muzakkâ al-Akhbâr ("Verified Reports")
- Al-Sahîhân ("The Two Books of sahîh Hadîths")
- Al-Talkhîs ("The Summary")
- Tarâjim al-Musnad `alâ Shart al-Sahîhayn ("The Reports of Ahmad's Musnad That Match the Criteria of the Two Books of Sahîh")
- Tarâjim al-Shuyûkh ("Biographies of the Shaykhs")
- Târîkh `Ulamâ' Ahl Naysabûr ("History of the Scholars of Naysabûr")

== See also ==
- Islamic scholars
- Hakim (title)
- Mujaddid

== Sources ==
- Zulfiqar Ayub (2 May 2015). THE BIOGRAPHIES OF THE ELITE LIVES OF THE SCHOLARS, IMAMS & HADITH MASTERS Biographies of The Imams & Scholars. pp. 133–196.
