= Abu Nu'aym al-Isfahani =

Persian Islamic scholar (948–1038)

Abu Nu`aym al-Isfahani
- Title: Al-Ḥāfiẓ

Personal life
- Born: 948 Isfahan
- Died: 23 October 1038
- Era: Islamic golden age
- Main interest(s): Hadith, Fiqh, History,
- Notable work(s): Hilyat al-Awliya', Dalail al-Nubuwwa
- Occupation: Muhaddith, Scholar

Religious life
- Religion: Islam
- Denomination: Sunni
- Jurisprudence: Shafi'i
- Creed: Ash'ari

Muslim leader
- Influenced by: Al-Shafi'i Abu Hasan al-Ash'ari Al-Tabarani Al-Hakim al-Nishapuri Al-Daraqutni Al-Khattabi Abu Bakr al-Ajurri
- Influenced: Al-Khatib al-Baghdadi Abu Muhammad al-Juwayni

Abu Nuʿaym al-Isfahani (أبـو نـعـيـم الأصـفـهـانـي; full name: Ahmad ibn ʿAbd Allāh ibn Ahmad ibn Ishāq ibn Mūsā ibn Mahrān al-Mihrānī al-Asbahānī (or al-Asfahānī) al-Ahwal al-Ash`arī al-Shāfi`ī, died 1038 CE / AH 430) was a medieval Persian Shafi'i scholar and one of the leading hadith scholars of his time. His family was an offshoot of the aristocratic House of Mihran.

== Biography ==
=== Birth and Education ===
Born in Buwayhid era Isfahan, his first teacher was his grandfather who was a Sufi master, Sheikh Muhammad ibn Yusuf ibn Ma;dan al-Banna' (d. 365/976), who was the spiritual leader of a school of Sufism in Isfahan, which continued to flourish during the lifetime of Abu Nu'aym. Under his father's lead and guide, he began his scholarly career at an early age. As he got older, he would widely travel and visit Hejaz, Iraq, Syria, Khurazan and other places. He possessed ijaza in hadith from all major scholars of his time.

=== Teachers ===
Abu Nu'aym had numerous teachers, his most famous ones include:

- Al-Tabarani (main teacher)
- Al-Hakim al-Nishapuri
- Al-Daraqutni
- Al-Khattabi
- Abu Bakr al-Ajurri
- Abu Zayd Marwazi

=== Transmitting Hadith and Teaching ===
When he sat down to transmit hadith and teach, the memorizers of hadith gathered in droves and crowded around him, and heavily benefited from him due to his elevated chains of transmission and combined with his ample knowledge and precision he possessed. He surpassed all his contemporaries.

=== Students ===
Abu Nu'aym had many students, his most famous ones include:

- Al-Khatib al-Baghdadi (foremost pupil)
- Abu Muhammad al-Juwayni
- Al-Malini
- Al-Dakhwani
- Abu al-Fadl Hamd bin Ahmed al-Haddad
- Abu Ali al-Hassan (his younger brother)

=== Death ===
He died in Ṣafar 430/November 1038.

== Reception ==
In his lifetime, the hadith scholars would state: "Abu Nu'aym (Imam Asbahani) possessed chains of transmission that no one in the world possessed during his time". He was praised and famous for possessing very short chains of transmission for hadith. His benefit of studying very young and living almost near 100 years was highly valued by hadith scholars of his time as they saw shorter chain of transmission to be stronger and more authentic. According to Ahmad ibn Hanbal: "The pursuit of short transmission chains is a Sunnah (a way) taken from those who came before us".

Abu Nu'aym was regarded as one of the best hadith authorities by his contemporary Khatib al-Baghdadi, and by Dhahabi and Taqi al-Din al-Subki.

Hamza bin al-Abbas al-Alawi said: "The hadith scholars used to say that the hadith master, Imam Asbahani remained in his field (of hadiths) for 14 years without equal (peerless), no one from the East to West possessing any chain (hadith) shorter than his, and there was no one stronger than him in memorization".

Ibn al-Salah in his book entitled Manual of Hadith Science, lists Abu Nu'aym among his seven selected scholars for the highest excellence in authorship of books in Islam.

== Theology ==
Imam Abu Nu'aym followed the Ash'ari doctrine as Ibn Asakir included him to be from the second generation of Imam Abu Hasan al-Ash'ari students and this is further confirmed by Ibn Al-Jawzi in his great compilation of history book entitled Al-Muntazam. This is even further confirmed by Abu Nu'aym criticisms of Hanbalite literalism in respect to anthropomorphic expressions in the Quran and Hadith, the Hanbalite Ibn Manda was reported to have been involved in a vicious dispute with him. He denounced Abu Nu’aym's creed as unorthodox and banished him from the Jami' mosque of Isfahan, that was dominated by Ibn Manda's Hanbali faction. Abu Nu'aym would later retaliate by accusing Ibn Manda, the head of the local Hanbalite traditionists, of being confusing and mixing up hadiths in his old age. Abu Nu'aym is unlikely to have been well trained in Ash'ari kalam himself however, but he did approve of it, calling it, "the kalam in accordance with the doctrine of the ahl al-sunnah".

Al-Dhahabi narrates the following incident that took place:

"For there was too much hostile one choosing and enmity between the Ash'aris and Hanbalis, leading to disagreements. Hearing this man call people to Al-Asbahani, the hadith scholars surrounded him with their pen-knives, and he was almost killed.

Al-Dhahabi comments above: "I say, that these are not hadith scholars, but ignorant transgressors (who cross the boundaries set by God) - may Allah keep their harm away!"

The Lebanese Hadith scholar, Gibril Haddad records a historical account and calls it a miracle:

"Imam Asbahani was bestowed a miracle upon him from Allah (God) when he was being banished from the main Mosque of Isfahan (Asbahan) by a group of people against him there. The same people were also unhappy with their ruler, Sultan Mahmud bin Subktukin's appointment of a certain man as a governor over them, and as a result these people ambushed him and killed the governor. Later, the Sultan pretended to solve the issue, had this group reunited in the main Mosque from which Imam Asbahani was banned. Then the Sultan had them all executed down to the last man. And so Imam Asbahani was saved by the harming of such opponents any longer, whilst those against him were punished by Allah, the Exalted."

== Works ==
Abû Nu`aym authored over a hundred works, among them:

- The Hilyat al-Awliya' is a substantial work in ten volumes, comprising a total of 695 biographies, amounting to about 4,000 pages in the printed edition. The work includes many biographies of early Islam. Most biographies of individuals that are directly involved with the development of Sufi mysticism are found in the tenth volume.
- Al-Arba`în `alâ Madhhab al-Mutahaqqiqîn min al-Sûfiyya, in print
- Dalâ'il al-Nubuwwa ("The Signs and Proofs of Prophethood"), devoted entirely to Muhammad, this large work - partly in print - was expanded by Al-Bayhaqi to seven volumes in a like-titled work.
- Dhikr Akhbâr Asbahân ("Memorial of the Chronicles of Ispahan"), in print
- Al-Du`afâ', in print
- Fadâ'il al-Khulafâ' al-Arba`a wa Ghayrihim, in print
- Fadîlat al-`Adilîn min al-Wulât, a collection of over forty narrations on just government and the duties of the governed towards the rulers. Al-Sakhawi documented each narration in detail and both the work and its documentation were published.
- Juz` fî Turuq Hadîth Inna Lillâhi Tis`atun wa Tis`îna Isman, in print
- Al-Mahdî.
- Ma`rifat al-Sahâba wa Fadâ'ilihim ("Knowing the Companions and Their Merits"), in print. This book was the basis of subsequent similar works by Ibn 'Abd al-Barr, Ibn al-Athir, and Ibn Hajar.
- Musnad al-Imâm Abî Hanîfa, in print
- Al-Mustakhraj `alâ al-Bukhârî ("Additional Narrations Meeting al-Bukhârî's Criterion"), in print
- Al-Mustakhraj `alâ Muslim ("Additional Narrations Meeting Muslim's Criterion"), in print
- Riyâdat al-Abdân, in print
- Al-Shu`arâ' ("The Poets").
- Al-Sifât. Al-Suyûtî mentioned it in his commentary on Sûrat al-Nâs in his book al-Iklîl fî Istinbât al-Tanzîl.
- Sifat al-Janna ("Description of Paradise"), in print
- Tabaqât al-Muhaddithîn wal-Ruwât ("Biography-Layers of the Hadîth Scholars and Narrators").
- Tasmiyatu mâ Intahâ ilaynâ min al-Ruwât `an al-Fadl ibn Dukayn `Aliyan, in print
- Tasmiyatu mâ Intahâ ilaynâ min al-Ruwât `an Sa`îd ibn Mansûr `Aliyan, in print
- Tathbît al-Imâma wa Tartîb al-Khilâfa, in print, a refutation of Shîasm.
- Al-Tibb al-Nabawî ("Prophetic Medicine").

== See also ==
- List of Sufis
- List of Ash'aris and Maturidis

== Sources ==
- Norman Calder, Jawid Ahmad Mojaddedi, Andrew Rippin, Classical Islam: a sourcebook of religious literature, Routledge, 2003, ISBN 978-0-415-24032-1, p. 237.
- ABU NU`AYM AL-ASBAHANI, Dr. G.F. Haddad
- Pourshariati, Parvaneh (2007). "Hamza al-Isfahani and Sasanid Historical Geography of Sini Muluk al-ard w'al-anbiya". In Gyselen, Rika (ed.). Des Indo-Grecs aux Sassanides: données pour l'histoire et la géographie historique. Peeters Publishers. pp. 111–140.
- Zulfiqar Ayub (2 May 2015). THE BIOGRAPHIES OF THE ELITE LIVES OF THE SCHOLARS, IMAMS & HADITH MASTERS Biographies of The Imams & Scholars. pp. 145–147.
