= Al-Bayhaqi =

11th-century Islamic hadith compiler

Imam Shaykh al-Islam Abu Bakr Ahmad ibn al-Husayn al-Bayhaqi
- Title: Shaykh al-Islam

Personal life
- Born: Ramadan 384 AH / October 994 Bayhaq, now Sabzevar, Razavi Khorasan Province, Iran
- Died: 10 Jumadi al-Awwal, 458 AH/ 9 April 1066 (aged 72) Nishapur, now Khorasan, Iran
- Era: Islamic golden age
- Main interest(s): Hadith, Islamic jurisprudence, Islamic theology
- Notable work(s): Sunan al-Kubra; Shu'ab al-Iman; Al-Sunan al-Wusta; Al-Asma' wa al-Sifat; Dalail al-Nubuwwa

Religious life
- Religion: Islam
- Denomination: Sunni
- Jurisprudence: Shafi'i
- Creed: Ash'ari

Muslim leader
- Influenced by: Al-Shafi'i Abu al-Hasan al-Ash'ari Al-Hakim al-Nishapuri Ibn Furak Abu Mansur Al-Baghdadi Abu Ishaq al-Isfarayini Al-Halimi Al-Sulami
- Influenced: Al-Juwayni Abu Ismail al-Harawi

Abū Bakr Aḥmad ibn al-Ḥusayn ibn ʿAlī ibn Mūsā al-Khusrawjirdī al-Bayhaqī (Persian: ابو بكر احمد بن حسين بن علي بن موسی خسروجردی بيهقی, 994–1066), also known as Imām al-Bayhaqī, was a Sunni scholar widely known for being the foremost leading hadith master in his age, leading authority in the Shafi'i school, leading authority on the foundation of doctrine, meticulous, a devoted ascetic and one of the notable defenders of the Ash'ari school. Al-Dhahabi said: "Unequalled in his age, unrivalled amongst his peers, and the Ḥāfiẓ of his time."

== Early life ==
=== Birth ===
Al-Bayhaqi was born c. 994 CE/384 AH in the small town of Khosrowjerd near Sabzevar, then known as Bayhaq, in Khorasan.

=== Education ===
Al-Bayhaqi spent his early years and childhood in the city of Bayhaq before moving elsewhere to pursue his studies. He journeyed throughout Khorazan, Iran, Iraq, Hejaz, and other Muslim countries out of a passion for knowledge. He narrated Hadith from numerous scholars during his intensive travels.

=== Teachers ===
He studied fiqh under two prominent jurists, Abū al-Fatḥ Nāṣir ibn al-Ḥusayn ibn Muḥammad al-Naysaburi as well as Abul Hasan Hankari. He studied hadith under Hakim al-Nishaburi (foremost leading hadith scholar at his time) and was al-Nishaburi's foremost pupil as well as extensively studying hadith under Abu Ishaq al-Isfarayini, Abu Bakr al-Barqani, and many others. Al-Bayhaqi belongs to the third generation of Ash'ari school and took kalam from two prominent theologians, Ibn Furak and Abu Mansur al-Baghdadi. He took his Tasawwuf as well as narrating hadith from Al-Sulami. He had the privilege to study kalam under Al-Halimi in his younger days.

== Scholarly life ==
Al-Bayhaqi taught and authored books in Bayhaq and lived most of his life there, until 1049, when he was asked to go to Nishapur. This request resulted from Al-Kunduri, the vizier of Tughril Beg, the Seljuq sultan who had been ruling from Nishapur since 1040, persecuting the Ash'arites. Al-Kunduri's motive for this attack was probably his competition with Aby Sahl Ibn al-Muwaffaq for the position of vizier; the latter was a Shafi'ite by law whereas al-Kunduri was a Hanafite. Two distinct Ash'arites, al-Qushayri and al-Juwayni, were barred from the mosques in or around 1049. The Sultan then issued an order imprisoning them, as well as Abu-Sahl Ibn al-Muwaffaq and other individuals. The two theologians eventually travelled to the Hijaz and left Nishapur. In the meantime, al-Bayhaqi had written a lengthy letter to al-Kunduri that has survived, demonstrating the Ash'arites' immunity from heretical accusations and requesting an end to the persecution. Al-Bayhaqi travelled to Nishapur approximately a year later; he may have stayed there for a few years prior to travelling to the Hijaz. Around the years 1063 and 1064, following al-Kunduri's imprisonment and eventual death, the exiles returned to Nishapur.

== Students ==
Al-Bayhaqi had large number of students. He would give them the authority to narrate and teach his books. His most famous pupils associated with him include:

- Al-Juwayni
- Abu Ismail al-Harawi
- his own son, Ismāýīl ibn Aĥmed al-Bayhaqī
- his own grandson Úbaydullāh ibn Muĥammad ibn Aĥmed al-Bayhaqī
- Ĥāfiž Abū Zakariyyah Yaĥyā ibn Mandah
- Abū Ábdullāh Muĥammad ibn al-Fađl Al-Furāwī
- Zāhir ibn Ţāhir ash-Shaĥāmiyy
- Abu’l Máālī Muĥammad ibn Ismāýīl al-Fārisī
- Abdu’l Jabbār ibn Abdu’l Wahhāb ad-Dah’hān
- Abdu’l Jabbār ibn Muĥammad al-Khuwārī and his brother
- Abdu’l Ĥamīd ibn Muĥammad al-Khuwārī

== Death ==
He died in Nishapur on the 10th of Jumādā al-ťlā, 458 AH corresponding to the 9th April 1066 at the age of 74. He was washed, put in a coffin, and transported [two days at the time] to Bayhaq, where he was buried.

== Asceticism ==
Al-Bayhaqi was known for his extreme piety and was a frugal spender in the same manner of the pious scholars. He constantly fasted for thirty years straight before his death except the days of Eid and Tashriq which are prohibited to fast. It is known that perpetual fast (Sawm al-Dahr) is a famous practise done by several companions and the Salaf such as Umar, Uthman, Ibn Shihab al-Zuhri, Abu Hanifa, Al-Shafi'i, Al-Tustari, etc.

Imam al-Nawawi explains this topic:

"Ibn Umar fasted permanently, i.e. except the days of Eid and Tashriq. This perpetual fast is his way and the way of his father Umar Ibn al-Khattab, Aisha, Abu Talha and others of the Salaf as well Al-Shafi'i and other scholars. This position is that perpetual fasting is not disliked (makruh).

== Creed ==
As mentioned previously, Imam al-Bayhaqi was trained by the esteemed Abu Bakr Ibn Furak and Abu Mansur al-Baghdadi, the two Imams who contributed to the establishment of the Ash'ari school of doctrine. Al-Bayhaqi is thus positioned among the Asha'ris of the third generation. Al-Bayhaqi was a traditionalist theologian and staunch Ash'ari who textually supported the Ash'ari doctrine as can be seen in his two classical works of creed called Al-Asma' wa al-Sifat and Al-'Itiqad wa al-Hidaya ila Sabil al-Rashad. In these textual based theological works, al-Bayhaqi establishes the Ash'ari school are true Sunnis who are with accordance to the creed of the pious predecessors.

Ibn al-Subki said that al-Bayhaqi said Muhammad's mention of Abu Musa al-Ash'aris people included Abu Hasan al-Ash'ari and his school. Al Bayhaqi said:

The prophet (PBUH) pointed to Abu Musa al-Ash'ari in relation to the verse: (Allah will bring a people whom HE loves and who love Him) (5:54) saying: "They are that man's people," due to the tremendous merit and noble rank attributed by this Hadith to the Imam Abu al-Hassan al-Ash'ari. For he is part of Abu Musa's people and one of his children who received knowledge and were granted discernment, and he was singled out for strengthening the Sunnah and repressing innovation by producing clear proofs and dispelling doubts. It is most likely that the prophet named Abu Musa's people a people believed by Allah because he knew the soundness of their religion and the strength of their belief. Therefore, whoever leans towards them in science of foundation of Religion and follows their position in disowning tashbih (likening Allah with His creation) while adhering to the Book and the Sunnah, is one of their number (people).

Al-Bayhaqi also had a variety of views stating his understanding of cosmology.

== Legacy ==
Al-Bayhaqi contributed to a significant reform in the traditionalist evaluation of hadith, emphasizing the use of reflective reasoning in evaluating which hadith material should be considered incompatible with Islamic theology. Often, Al-Bayhaqi would then understand such hadith as less reliable or allegorical.

Al-Bayhaqi is regarded as the last person in history to comprehensively collect and assemble the textual evidence of the Shafi'i madhab including the hadith, the opinions of Imam Shafi'i and those of his direct students. Imam al-Haramayn al-Juwayni said: "There is no Shafi'i except he owes a huge debt to Al-Shafi'i except al-Bayhaqi, to whom al-Shafi'i owes a huge debt for his (Bayhaqi's) works which imposed al-Shafi'i's school and his sayings (enforced and strengthened)." Al-Dhahabi comments: "Abu Al-Ma'ali (Ibn Al-Juwayni) is right! It is as he said, and if al-Bayhaqi had wanted to found a school of Law (madhab) for himself he would have been able to do so, due to the vastness of his sciences and his thorough knowledge of juridical differences (legal matters)."

Al-Bayhaqi arranged the Imam al-Shafi'i statements and proof texts in the extensive Marifat al-Sunan wa-al-Athar. He then assembled his Al-Sunan al-Kubra, a gigantic collection of hadiths that included prophetic traditions and companions opinions to support every point of Shafi'i's substantive law. As a specialist in the Shafi'i law and al-Muzani's Mukhtasar, al-Bayhaqi was much sought for. His writings were highly revered and frequently cited by both later Shafi'is and Hanbalis. Al-Bayhaqi's writings reflected the new Shafi'i orthodoxy. Works like Sunan al-Kubra and Al-Sunan al-Wusta championed the body of substantive law of the school and the Shafi'i transmission-based legal methodology. Al-Bayhaqi represents the school's steadfast adherence to the hadith's primacy, which its founder had argued for. The use of Sahih al-Bukhari and Sahih Muslim as authentic books was first introduced by Al-Bayhaqi.

According to Scott Lucas in "Perhaps You Only Kissed Her?", al-Bayhaqi sealed and consolidated the hadith canon since what he added was accepted as canonical and what he left out was not, and his decisions were respected by later scholars. In his thesis, he added that al-Bayhaqi was the final compiler of the original hadith collections.

Imam Ibn Subki states:

"He was the Imam Bayhaqi: one of the Imams of the Muslims, guides of the believers, and callers to the firm rope of Allah. He was a sublime jurist (faqih jalil), an eminent (kabir) hafiz; an adept jurisprudent (usulu nihrir); abstinent; godly; obedient to Allah (qanit li'llah); firm in supporting the Shafi'i legal school, in terms of methodology (aslan) and derivation of law (fur'ian); and a mountain from the mountains of knowledge...He was the muhaddith of his time (zaman) Shaykh of the Sunnah in his era (waqt).

== Works ==
Bayhaqi was a prominent prolific author in his time, having authored more than one thousand volumes according to Al-Dhahabi. Al-Dhahabi also said in Siyar A'lam al-Nubala': "Al-Bayhaqi’s writings are of great value and abundant in benefits. There are few who wrote as good as Imam Abu Bakr (al-Bayhaqi), so the world should take care of these (books).

Among the most well-known books authored by him are:

- Sunan al-Kubra ("The Major Book of the Prophet's Sunnnas"), is a 24 volume hadith compilation and considered his magnum opus.
- Shu'ab al-Iman ("The Branches of Faith").
- Al-Sunan al-Wusta, also referred to as [Ma`arifa al-Sunan wa al-Athar] ("The Knowledge of Sunnas and Reports"), is a textual compilation supporting the Shafi'i doctrine.
- Bayan Khata Man Akhta`a `Ala al-Shafi`i ("The Exposition of the Error of Those who have Attributed Error to al-Sahfi`i").
- Al-Mabsut fi Nusus al-Shafiyi ("The Extensive: Documents used by Al-Shafiyi") in two volumes
- Al-Mabsut ("The Expanded [Reference Book]"), on Shafi`i Law.
- Al-Asma' wa al-Sifat ("The Divine Names and Attributes"), Ibn al-Subki said: “I do not know anything comparable to it!”
- Al-I`tiqad `ala Madhhab al-Salaf Ahl al-Sunna wa al-Jama`a ("Islamic Doctrines According to the School of the Predecessors Which is the School of the People of the Prophet’s (S) Way and Congretgatoin of His Companions") in about forty brief chapters.
- Dalail al-Nubuwwa ("The Signs of Prophethood") in about seven volumes, about Prophet Muhammad (s) as al-Qadi `Iyad’s Al-Shifa bi Ta'rif Huquq al-Mustafa is the foremost condensed book on this topic.
- Al-Da`awat al-Kabir ("The Major Book of Supplications") in two volumes, which, like al-Adhkar by al-Nawawi and al-Jazari's corresponding work, arranges the narrations linked to the subject according to circumstance.
- Al-Da`awat al-Saghir ("The Minor Book of Supplications")
- Al-Zuhd al-Kabir ("The Major Book of Asceticism"), which uses subject headings to organise the pertinent narratives for the early Sufis and Companions.
- Al-Báath [wa’n Nushūr] ("Resurrection and Judgement Day")
- At-Targhib wa’t Tarhib ("Encouragement to do good and Warning to abstain from evil")
- Al-Sunan al-Şaghir ("The Smaller Collection of Sunnah")
- Al-Arb`un al-Kubra ("The Major Collections of Forty Hadith") in two volumes.
- Al-Arb`un al-Sughra ("The Minor Collections of Forty Hadith").
- Al-Khilafiyyat ("The Divergences" [between al-Shafi`i and Abu Hanifa]) in three volumes on the differences of opinion among jurists.
- Al-Mad’khal ila’s Sunan ("An Introduction to the Sunnah")
- Al-Adab ("The book of Etiquette")
- Fada’il al-Awqat ("Times of Particular Merit")
- Ar-Ru’yah ("The Book of Dreams")
- Al-Asra’a ("The Book of Ascension")
- Manaqib al-Shafi`i ("The Immense Merits of al-Shafi`i") in two volumes
- Manaqib al-Imam Ahmad ("The Immense merits of Imam Ahmad")
- Tarikh Hukama al-Islam ("History of the Rulers of Islam")

== See also ==
- List of Ash'aris
