= Ibn Jurayj =

Eighth-century Meccan Islamic scholar

Imam Ibn Jurayj
- ابن جريج

Mufti of Mecca
- Preceded by: Ata ibn Abi Rabah
- Succeeded by: Sufyan ibn ʽUyaynah
- Title: al-Imām al-Jalīl ('The Eminent Imām') - al-Ḥāfiẓ - al-ʿĀlim al-Faqīh ('The Erudite Scholar and Jurist') - Shaykh al-Ḥaram ('The Shaykh of Haram') - Mudawwin al-ʿIlm bi-Makkah ('The compiler of knowledge in Mecca')

Personal life
- Born: 80 AH / 699 CE Mecca, Umayyad Caliphate
- Died: 11 Dhu al-Hijjah 150 AH / 7 January 768 CE (aged 67 - 68) Mecca, Abbasid Caliphate
- Home town: Mecca
- Children: Muhammad bin 'Abdul Malik bin Jurauj, 'Abdul 'Aziz
- Parent: Abd al-Aziz ibn Jurayj (father)
- Era: Umayyad Caliphate
- Region: Hejaz
- Main interest(s): Islamic jurisprudence, hadith, Quranic exegesis
- Notable work: Tafsir Ibn Jurayj

Religious life
- Religion: Islam

Muslim leader
- Teacher: Amr ibn Dinar, Ata ibn Abi Rabah, Hisham ibn Urwah, Ibn Shihab al-Zuhri, Ma'mar ibn Rashid, Musa ibn ʿUqba, Nafi Mawla Ibn Umar, Tawus ibn Kaysan
- Students: Abd al-Rahman al-Awza'i, Abd al-Razzaq al-San'ani, Abd Allah ibn al-Mubarak, Abd Allah ibn Wahb al-Rasibi, Al-Layth ibn Sa'd, Hammad bin Zayd, Sufyan ibn ʽUyaynah, Waki' ibn al-Jarrah, Yahya ibn Sa'id al-Qattan
- Influenced by: Ata ibn Abi Rabah, Amr ibn Dinar
- Arabic name
- Personal (Ism): ʿAbd al-Malik عبد الملك
- Patronymic (Nasab): ibn ʿAbd al-ʿAzīz ibn Jurayj بن عبد العزيز بن جريج
- Teknonymic (Kunya): Abū Khālid / Abū al-Walīd أَبُو خَالِد / أَبُو الْوَلِيد
- Toponymic (Nisba): al-Rūmī al-Umawī al-Qurashī al-Makkī الرومي الأموي القرشي المكي

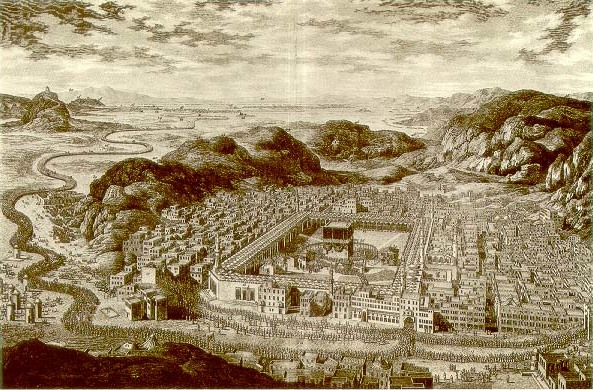
A historical picture of Mecca, where Ibn Jurayj was born.

ʿAbd al-Malik ibn ʿAbd al-ʿAzīz ibn Jurayj al-Rūmī al-Umawī al-Qurashī al-Makkī (Arabic: عبد الملك بن عبد العزيز بن جريج الرومي الأموي القرشي المكي, 80 AH/699 CE - 150 AH/767 CE) commonly known as Ibn Jurayj ([/ʔibn ʒuˈrajʒ/]) was an eighth-century tabi'i faqīh, exegete and transmitter of hadith.

A student of early Meccan jurist Ata ibn Abi Rabah, Ibn Jurayj became a scholar in his own right and served as the mufti of Mecca under the Umayyads. He composed works on Quranic exegesis and the rites of pilgrimage, and his compilation of hadith, Kitab al-Sunan, was a founding work of the musannaf genre. Though lost, much of the latter was preserved in the musannaf of his student Abd al-Razzaq al-San'ani, who cites Ibn Jurayj as an informant in approximately one-third of the traditions transmitted.

== Biography ==
=== Early life ===
Ibn Jurayj was born in Mecca in the year 80 AH / 699 CE. Jurayj is an Arabicized form of the Greek name Grēgórios. His grandfather Jurayj was of Byzantine origin and had been a slave owned by Umm Habib bint Jubayr, a Meccan woman from the Umayyad clan of Quraysh. His father 'Abd al-'Azīz was a faqīh and according to a report, was a slave of Fāṭimah bint Jubayr ibn Muṭʿim, the daughter of Jubayr ibn Muṭʿim. His father was set free, and thus Ibn Jurayj became a client (mawlā) of the Umayyads, specifically of Umayyah ibn Khālid ibn Asīd. Ibn Jurayj would sometimes affiliate himself with Banu Nawfal (the family of his mother), and other times with the Banu Umayyah, who were the 'iṣbah (agnatic kin) of his clientage.

Ibn Jurayj had two kunyas: Abū Khālid and Abū al-Walīd. His residence was located on the side of Mount Marwa, and was constructed entirely from white gypsum; reportedly built by the Umayyad caliph Mu'awiya I (r. 661–680).

=== Education ===
At the age of fourteen, he was accepted to the study circle of Meccan jurist Ata ibn Rabah (d. 115/733) after previously being rejected twice due to lacking knowledge on Quran and Islamic inheritance laws with whom he studied for eighteen to nineteen years.

After Ata's death, he attached himself to his second teacher, Amr ibn Dinar (d. 126/743-4), under whom he studied under for approximately 7 years.

=== Travels ===
Ibn Jurayj spent most of his life within the Hejaz, where he may have visited the Prophet's Mosque in Medina. He did not travel beyond the region until 143 AH / 760 CE, when, at over sixty-five years of age, he embarked on a journey to Yemen and subsequently to Iraq.

He initially travelled to Yemen to meet the governor Ma'n ibn Za'ida al-Shaybani. According to reports, Ibn Jurayj came to him as a delegate due to a debt he had incurred. He remained with Yemen until the 10th of Dhu al-Qadah. Upon seeing people preparing for Hajj, he requested Ma'n to be sent back to Mecca. Ma'n hired guides for him, gave him 500 dinars, and handed him an additional 1,500. He also gifted him fifteen mules loaded with Yemeni goods, bundles of cloth, silver coins, and various types of provisions. He returned to Mecca, arriving just in time for the Day of Arafah. During his time in Yemen, he was heard by the scholars of Sanaa, including Abd al-Razzaq al-San'ani.

Ibn Jurayj returned to Mecca, but did not stay long as he was again in debt, eventually pushing him to travel again, this time eastwards to Iraq. He arrived in Basra in the latter part of 144 AH / 762 CE and stayed there through 145 AH / 763 CE. The following year, after the construction of Baghdad was completed in 146 AH / 764 CE by Abbasid caliph Abū Jaʿfar al-Manṣūr (r. 754–775), Ibn Jurayj traveled to the city in hopes of receiving a reward.

Ibn Jurayj came to al-Mansur, and he still had a debt upon him. He said: "I have compiled the hadiths of your grandfather Ibn Abbas like no one else has. However, al-Mansur did not give him any reward. Instead, he entrusted him to Sulaymān ibn Mujālid, a man who used to accompany the caliph, and Ḥajjāj ibn Muḥammad al-Muṣayṣī. Sulaymān ibn Mujālid provided him with assistance." So Ibn Jurayj said to him: "I do not know how to repay you, but take my books and have them copied."

Following this, Ibn Jurayj returned to Mecca, where he spent the rest of his years until his death on 11 Dhu al-Hijjah 150 AH / 7 January 768 CE.

== Views ==
Ibn Jurayj believed in the permissibility of temporary marriage (nikah mut'ah). The number of mut'ah marriages he contracted is given variously as 60 by Jarir ibn Abdullah al-Dabbi, 70 by Al-Shafi‘i, and 90 by Al-Dhahabi, although narrations present in later sources describe Ibn Jurayj retracting this opinion. Harald Motzki suggests his view on mut'ah accorded with a Meccan school tradition that was originated by Ibn Abbas and developed by his student Ata ibn Abi Rabah, and thus did not stem from the Sunni-Shi'ite dispute on the matter.

== Works ==
Ibn Jurayj wrote his books on the leaves of Calotropis procera, and later copied them on parchments. Whenever a hadith scholar would arrive in Mecca, he would show it to him.

=== Kitab al-Sunan ===
Ibn Jurayj compiled a collection of hadith known as Kitab al-Sunan or Al-Jāmiʿ (The Comprehensive Collection), which is credited with initiating the musannaf genre of hadith literature. His student Abd al-Razzaq claimed that he was the first to arrange hadith thematically, arranging them into subject-based chapters. Ibn al-Nadim described the work as resembling later Sunan collections, containing chapters on purification, fasting, prayers, and Zakat. Although the work has been lost, substantial portions are preserved in the musannaf of Abd al-Razzaq and other later compilations. Approximately one-third of the traditions found in Abd al-Razzaq's Musannaf are transmitted from Ibn Jurayj.

=== Tafsir ===
Ibn Jurayj is credited with composing one of the earliest works of Quranic exegesis (tafsir). More than a dozen students are reported to have studied tafsir with him, though only five of them are known to have transmitted his tafsir with certainty. Among them, Ḥajjāj ibn Muḥammad al-Miṣṣīṣī al-A'war (d. 206 AH/820-1 CE) transmitted two versions of tafsir from him: a shorter version that Ibn Jurayj dictated from memory as he did not have the physical copy at that time, and a larger and expansive version that Ibn Jurayj dictated from his written copy. In February 2019, a partial manuscript of the shorter version was identified in the Zahiriyya Library (formerly catalogued No. 10990), containing commentary on the verses from the middle of Surah Nisa to Surah Waqqiyah. It was published by Dār al-Kamāl with partial reconstructions of the lost sections from earlier citations.

=== Kitāb al-Manāsik ===
Being the mufti and jurist of Mecca, he authored a work titled Kitāb al-Manāsik ('The Book of Pilgrimage Rites'). It contained the knowledge that pilgrims needed annually during the Hajj season. This may have been an expansion on the chapter of Hajj from his hadith compilation. The transmission of Kitāb al-Manāsik was extremely rare among later scholars, and the work itself has not survived.

Ahmad ibn Hanbal remarked about it: "Ibn Jurayj used to narrate to people from other people's books, except during the days of Ḥajj, when he would bring out his own Book of Manāsik and narrate to them from it."

== Legacy ==
=== Hadith ===
Hadith transmitted by Ibn Jurayj are present in all six of the canonical Sunni hadith collections. During his stay in Yemen, Ibn Jurayj's lectures were attended by ʽAbd al-Razzaq al-Sanʽani, who included 5,000 of the traditions taught in his musannaf.

Ibn Jurayj's status as a hadith transmitter was viewed positively by his student Yahya ibn Sa'id al-Qattan, although he cast doubt on those traditions which had been transmitted from memory and where an informant had been concealed (tadlis). The evaluation of Ibn Jurayj being a trustworthy transmitter when not practicing tadlis was also shared by later hadith critics, including Ahmad ibn Hanbal, Yahya ibn Maʻin, and Ali ibn al-Madini. More recently, Motzki assessed Ibn Jurayj's material in Abd al-Razzaq al-Sanʽani's musannaf, concluding he did not forge the traditions he transmitted.

== See also ==
- Ma'mar ibn Rashid
- Ibn Shihab al-Zuhri
- Hadith studies
