= Salaf =

First three generations of Muslims

Salaf (Arabic: سلف, 'ancestors' or 'predecessors'), also often referred to with the honorific expression of al-salaf al-ṣāliḥ (السلف الصالح, 'the pious predecessors'), are often taken to be the first three generations of Muslims. This comprises companions of the Islamic prophet Muhammad (the Sahabah), their followers (the Tabi'un), and the followers of the followers (the Taba al-Tabi'in). Their religious significance lay in the statement attributed to Muhammad: "The best of my community are my generation, the ones who follow them and the ones who follow them", a period believed to exemplify the purest form of Islam. The generations of Muslims after the third are referred to as the Khalaf.

== Second generation ==
The Tabi‘un, the successors of Sahabah.

- Amir al-Sha'bi
- Abu Muslim Al-Khawlani
- Abu Suhail an-Nafi' ibn 'Abd ar-Rahman
- Al-Ahnaf
- Malik Ibn Anas
- Abu Hanifa
- Ja'far al-Sadiq
- Al-Rabi Ibn Khuthaym
- Ali Akbar
- Ali ibn Husayn (Zain-ul-'Abidin)
- Alqama ibn Qays al-Nakha'i
- Ata Ibn Abi Rabah
- Atiyya bin Saad
- Hasan al-Basri
- Iyas Ibn Muawiyah Al-Muzani
- Masruq ibn al-Ajda'
- Muhammad al-Baqir
- Muhammad ibn al-Hanafiyyah
- Muhammad Ibn Wasi' Al-Azdi
- Muhammad ibn Muslim ibn Shihab al-Zuhri
- Muhammad ibn Munkadir
- Muhammad Ziyaad Cheekhoory
- Nafi Mawla Ibn Umar
- Muhammad ibn Sirin, son of a slave of Khalid ibn al-Walid
- Musa ibn Nusayr
- Qasim ibn Muhammad ibn Abi Bakr
- Raja ibn Haywa
- Sa'id ibn Jubayr
- Said ibn al-Musayyib
- Salamah ibn Dinar
- Salih Ibn Ashyam Al-Adawi
- Salim Ibn Abdullah Ibn Umar Ibn al-Khattab
- Shuraih Al-Qadhi
- Sufyan al-Thawri
- Tariq Ibn Ziyad
- Tawus Ibn Kaysan
- Umar Ibn Abdul-Aziz
- Umm Kulthum bint Abu Bakr
- Urwah Ibn Al-Zubayr
- Uwais al-Qarni
- Amr ibn Dinar

== Third generation ==
The Tabi‘ al-Tabi‘in, the successors of the Tabi‘un.

- Abd al-Rahman al-Ghafiqi
- Al Qutaybah
- Muhammad al-Nafs al-Zakiyya
- Muhammad bin Qasim
- Rabi'a al-'Adawiyya al-Qaysiyya
- Al-Shafi‘i
- Zayd ibn Ali
- Ishaq ibn Rahwayh
- Al-Layth ibn Sa'd
- Sufyan ibn Uyaynah

== See also ==
- List of Sahaba
- Non-Muslims who interacted with Muslims during Muhammad's era
