= Sahih al-Bukhari =

First hadith collection of the Six Books of Sunni Islam

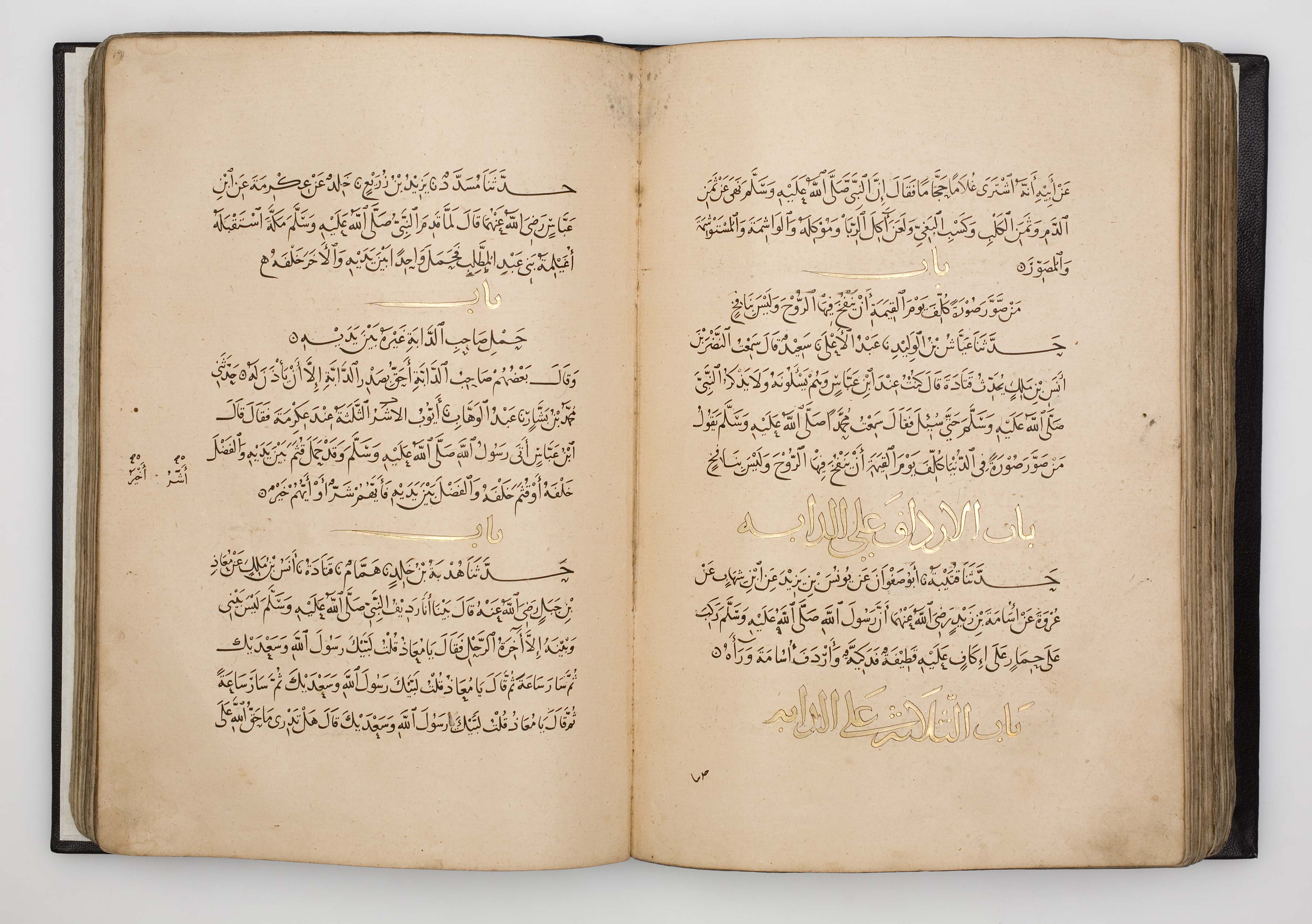
- Manuscript of Sahih al-Bukhari from the 14/15th-century
- Author: Al-Bukhari
- Language: Arabic
- Series: Kutub al-Sittah
- Genre: Hadith collection
- ISBN: 978-1-56744-519-0
- OCLC: 47899632
- Original text: Sahih al-Bukhari at Arabic Wikisource

Al-Jāmiʻ-Us Ṣaḥīḥ al-Mukhtaṣar min Umūr Rasūl Allāh ṣallā Allāh ʻalayhi wa-sallam wa-sunanihi wa-ayāmihi, (Note: lit. 'The Abridged, Authentic, Musnad, Comprehensive Collection concerning the affairs of the Messenger of Allah, Peace and Blessings of Allah be upon him, his Sunnah, and his days') commonly known as Sahih al-Bukhari (Arabic: صحيح البخاري, romanized: Ṣaḥīḥ al-Bukhārī, lit. 'The Authentic [Collection] of al-Bukhari'), is the first hadith collection of the Six Books of Sunni Islam. Compiled by Islamic scholar al-Bukhari (d. 870 CE) in the musannaf format, the work is valued by Sunni Muslims alongside Sahih Muslim as the most authentic piece of Islamic text after the Qur'an.

Al-Bukhari organised the book mostly in the Hijaz at the Sacred Mosque of Mecca and the Prophet's Mosque of Medina, and completed the work in Bukhara around 846 CE (232 AH). The work was examined by his teachers Ahmad ibn Hanbal, Ali ibn al-Madini, Yahya ibn Ma'in, and others.

== Content and structure ==
Classical hadith scholars provided conflicting hadith counts through manual counting. The most prevalent number today is 7,563, given by the editor Muḥammad Fuʾād ʿAbd al-Bāqī. ʿAbd al-Sattār critiques this figure, noting that ʿAbd al-Bāqī included several suspended (muʿallaq) and post-Prophetic reports in his count. Various other totals have been proposed. After surveying the various proposed numbers, Khaldūn al-Aḥdab argues that the correct count is 7,208. According to Ibn Ḥajar al-Asqalani, the number of hadith without repetition is 2,602.

The collection contains 153 hadith with multiple chains, 344 corroborating reports (mutābaʿāt), 1,341 suspended reports (muʿallaqāt, in chapter headings), and 1,608 post-Prophetic reports (in chapter headings). The shortest isnāds are 22 hadith with three-narrator chains (including the Companion), while the longest chain consists of nine narrators (with four narrators between al-Bukhārī and the first Companion cited).

Of the hadith in the Ṣaḥīḥ, 55% relate to law (aḥkām); 11% to comportment (ādāb); 11% to history and maghāzī; 7% to hagiography (manāqib); 7% to Qurʾānic exegesis (tafsīr); 4% to heart-softening (riqāq); 4% to theology; and 1% to eschatology (fitan).

The work is divided into 78 chapter (kitāb) titles, though some printed editions contain 19 additional chapters added by ʿAbd al-Bāqī.

== Sources ==
Classical and modern scholarship agree that al-Bukhārī composed his Ṣaḥīḥ drawing on a mixture of earlier written sources and live oral traditions, though he rarely names his sources explicitly. A modern study concludes that he relied more heavily on written sources than oral ones. Among the notable works he drew upon are: Maghāzī of Mūsā ibn ʿUqba, Jāmiʿ Maʿmar ibn Rāshid, multiple recensions of Mālik's Muwaṭṭaʾ, Al-Shāfiʿī's Umm, Al-Farrāʾ's Maʿānī al-Qurʾān, Maʿmar b. al-Muthannā's Majāz al-Qurʾān, ʿAbd al-Razzāq's Muṣannaf, Ibn Abī Shayba's Muṣannaf, Aḥmad ibn Ḥanbal's Musnad, multiple works of Abu Ubaid al-Qasim, Al-Humaydi, Ibn Jurayj, and several early tafsīr documents.

== Development ==
=== Collection ===
It is reported that Bukhari traveled widely throughout the Abbasid Caliphate from the age of 16. Bukhari found the earlier hadith collections including both ṣaḥīḥ (authentic, sound) and hasan narrations. He also found that many of them included daʻīf (weak) narrations. This aroused his interest in compiling hadith whose authenticity was beyond doubt.

What further strengthened his resolve was something his teacher and contemporary hadith scholar Ishaq Ibn Rahwayh had told him. Bukhari narrates, "We were with Ishaq Ibn Rahwayh who said, "If only you would compile a book of only authentic narrations of the Prophet." This suggestion remained in my heart so I began compiling the Sahih." Bukhari also said, "I saw the Prophet in a dream and it was as if I was standing in front of him. In my hand was a fan with which I was protecting him. I asked some dream interpreters, who said to me, 'You will protect him from lies'. This is what compelled me to produce the Sahih."

Bukhari imposed four conditions the narrators of a hadith must meet, in order for the narration to be included in his Sahih:

- being just,
- possessing strong memory and all the scholars who possess great knowledge of hadith must agree upon the narrators' ability to learn and memorize, along with their reporting techniques,
- complete isnad without any missing narrators,
- consecutive narrators in the chain must meet each other.

Bukhari began organizing his book in the Masjid al-Haram in Mecca, before moving to the Al-Masjid an-Nabawi in Medina. Bukhari completed writing the book in Bukhara around 846 CE (232 AH), before showing it to his teachers for examination and verification. Ibn Hajar quoted Abu Jaʿfar al-'Uqaili as saying, "after Bukhari had written the Sahih, he showed it to Ali ibn al-Madini, Ahmad ibn Hanbal, Yahya ibn Ma'in, as well as others. They examined it and testified to its authenticity with the exception of four hadith." Ibn Hajar then concluded with al-'Uqaili's saying, "And those four are as Bukhari said, they are authentic." Bukhari spent the last twenty-four years of his life visiting other cities and scholars, making minor revisions to his book and teaching the hadith he had collected. In every city that Bukhari visited, thousands of people would gather to listen to him recite traditions.

=== Transmission ===
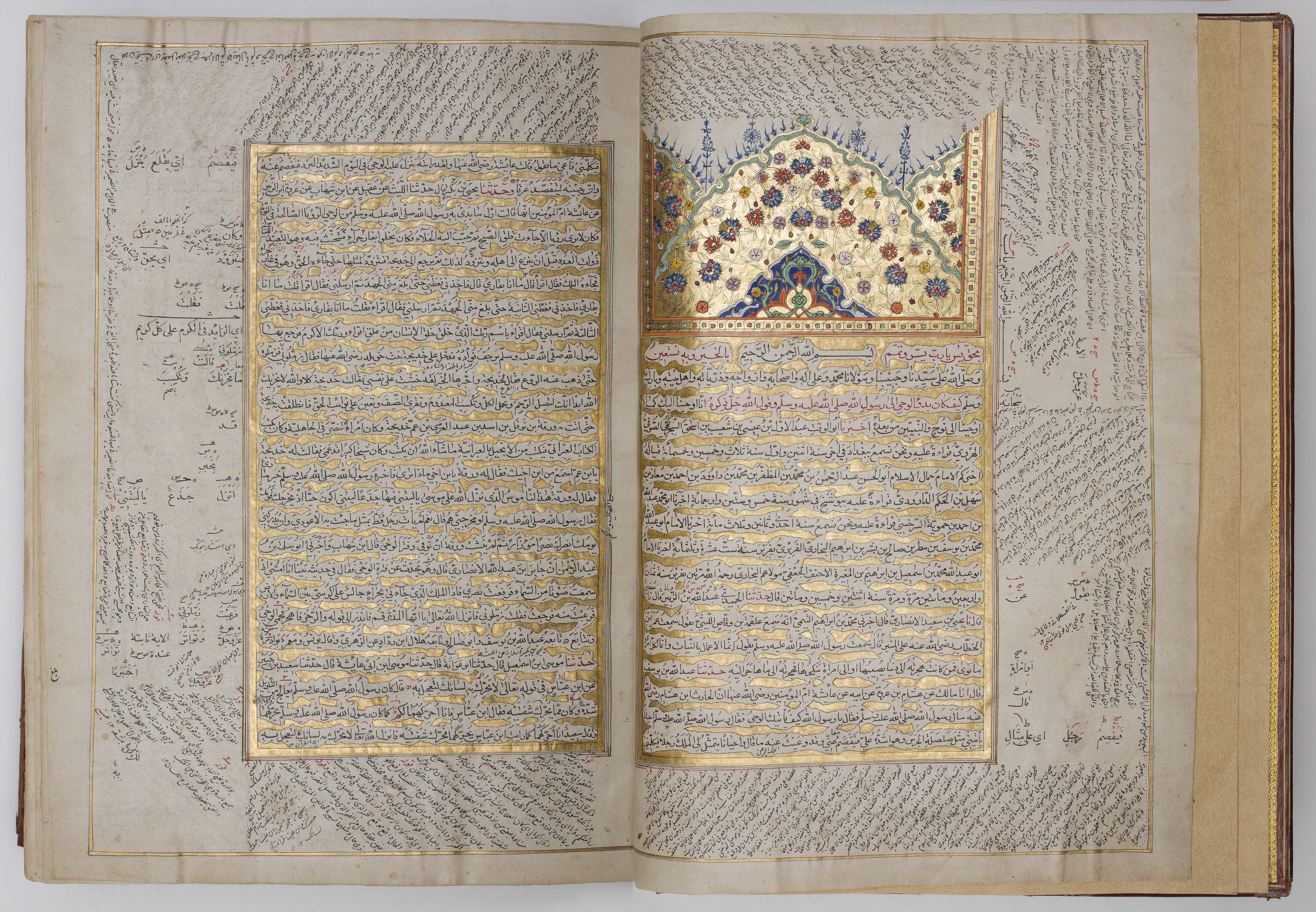
Single volume of the Sahih al-Bukhari, from the mid-19th century in the Khalili Collection of Islamic Art

Each version of the Sahih is named by its narrator. Ibn Hajar in his book Nukat asserts the number of narrations is the same in each version. There are many books that noted differences between the different versions, the best known being Fath al-Bari. The version transmitted by Muhammad ibn Yusuf al-Firabri (died 932), a trusted student of Bukhari, is the most famous version of the Sahih al-Bukhari today. All modern printed version are derived from this version. Al-Khatib al-Baghdadi quoted al-Firabri in History of Baghdad: "About seventy thousand people heard Sahih Bukhari with me." al-Firabri is not the only transmitter of Sahih al-Bukhari. Many others narrated the book, including Ibrahim ibn Ma'qal (died 907), Hammad ibn Shakir (died 923), Mansur Burduzi (died 931) and Husain Mahamili (died 941).

==== One of the Transmissions from Bukhari to present day ====
From later to earlier -

1. Yemani sheikh Ali al-Jifri
2. Imam Aḥmad ibn ʿAbd al-Raḥmān al-Saqqāf
3. Imam ʿAlī ibn Muḥammad al-Ḥibshī
4. Imam ʿAydarūs ibn ʿUmar al-Ḥibshī
5. Imam ʿAbd Allāh ibn Aḥmad Bāsūdān
6. Imam ʿUmar ibn ʿAbd al-Raḥmān al-Bār
7. Ḥāmid ibn ʿUmar ibn Ḥāmid
8. Al-Ḥabīb ʿAbd al-Raḥmān ibn ʿAbd Allāh Bā Faqīh
9. Al-Ḥasan ibn ʿAlī al-ʿUjaymī and Shaykh Aḥmad ibn Muḥammad al-Mithlī
10. Muḥammad ibn ʿAlāʾ al-Dīn al-Bāblī
11. Abū al-Najā Sālim ibn Muḥammad al-Samhūrī
12. al-Najm Muḥammad ibn Aḥmad al-Ghīṭī
13. Zakariyyā ibn Muḥammad al-Anṣārī
14. Aḥmad ibn ʿAlī ibn Ḥajar al-ʿAsqalānī
15. Ibrāhīm ibn Aḥmad al-Tanūkhī and ʿAbd al-Raḥīm ibn Razīn al-Ḥamawī
16. Abū al-Faḍl Aḥmad ibn Abī Ṭālib al-Ḥajjār
17. al-Ḥusayn al-Mubārak al-Zubaydī
18. Abū al-Waqt ʿAbd al-Awwal ibn ʿĪsā al-Harawī
19. Abū al-Ḥasan ʿAbd al-Raḥmān ibn al-Muẓaffar al-Dāwūdī
20. Abū Muḥammad ʿAbd Allāh ibn Aḥmad al-Sarakhsī
21. Abū ʿAbd Allāh Muḥammad ibn Yūsuf ibn Maṭar al-Farabrī
22. Abū ʿAbd Allāh Muḥammad ibn Ismāʿīl al-Bukhārī

=== Manuscripts ===
The number of extant manuscripts of Sahih Bukhari is difficult to assess. An Islamic Manuscripts catalog published in 1991 by Royal Āl al-Bayt Institute lists 2,327 manuscripts of Bukhari, while a 2016 study indicates there are more than 1,500 manuscripts in Turkey alone.

The oldest known copy is dated 360–390 AH/970–1000 CE, transmitted via the narration of al-Marwazī from al-Firabri from al-Bukhārī. It was first published by the Orientalist Mingana in Cambridge in 1936, consisting of three chapters. In 2018, Anas Wakāk identified a further section of the same manuscript in the British Library, comprising eighteen chapters. Mingana had attributed the manuscript to the Andalusian scholar al-Aṣīlī; however, in his study of the manuscript, Wakāk concludes that it could not have been written by al-Aṣīlī, on the basis of codicological and paleographical analysis. He instead attributes it to a Mashriqī student of al-Marwazī, most likely Abū al-Ḥasan ibn Baqā.

The oldest complete surviving manuscript is located at Süleymaniye Library which was completed in Al-Andalus on 3rd Sha'ban 550 AH/2 October 1155 CE. It is based on Abu Dharr’s recension and was compared with several key manuscripts by the scribe and later owners. In 2018, a facsimile edition of the manuscript was published by ISAM.

Other Notable manuscripts includes a copy written by Al-Ṣadafī on 21 Muharram 508 AH/27th June 1114 CE and another by Ibn Sa'ada in 492 AH/1098-1099 CE of which three out of five volumes survive in National Library of Morocco.

The oldest known extant manuscript of Bukhari, published by Mingana in 1936

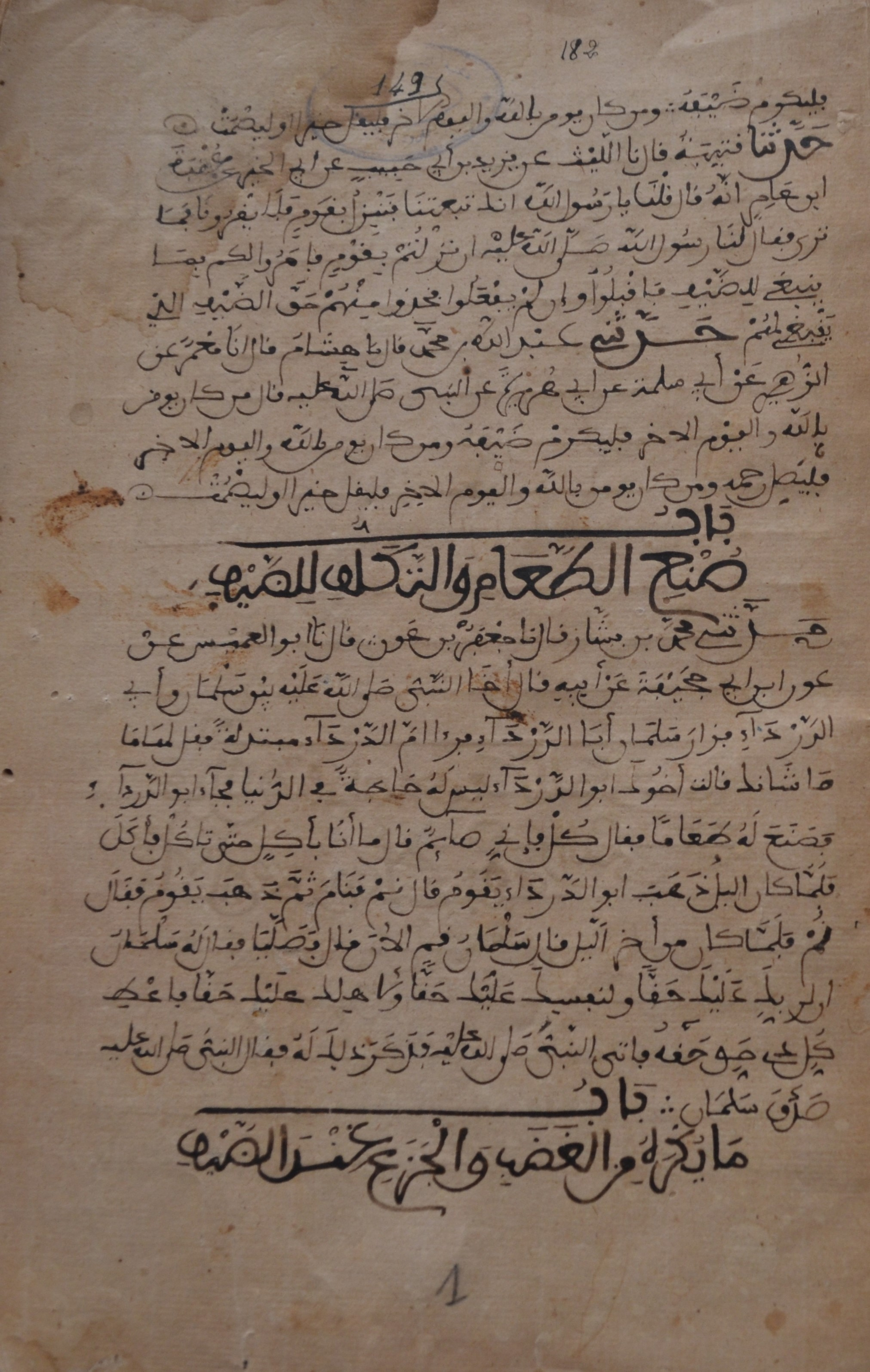
A manuscript of Bukhari, copied in Ramadan 490 AH/1097 CE in Maghrebi script, housed in a library of Mohammed V University

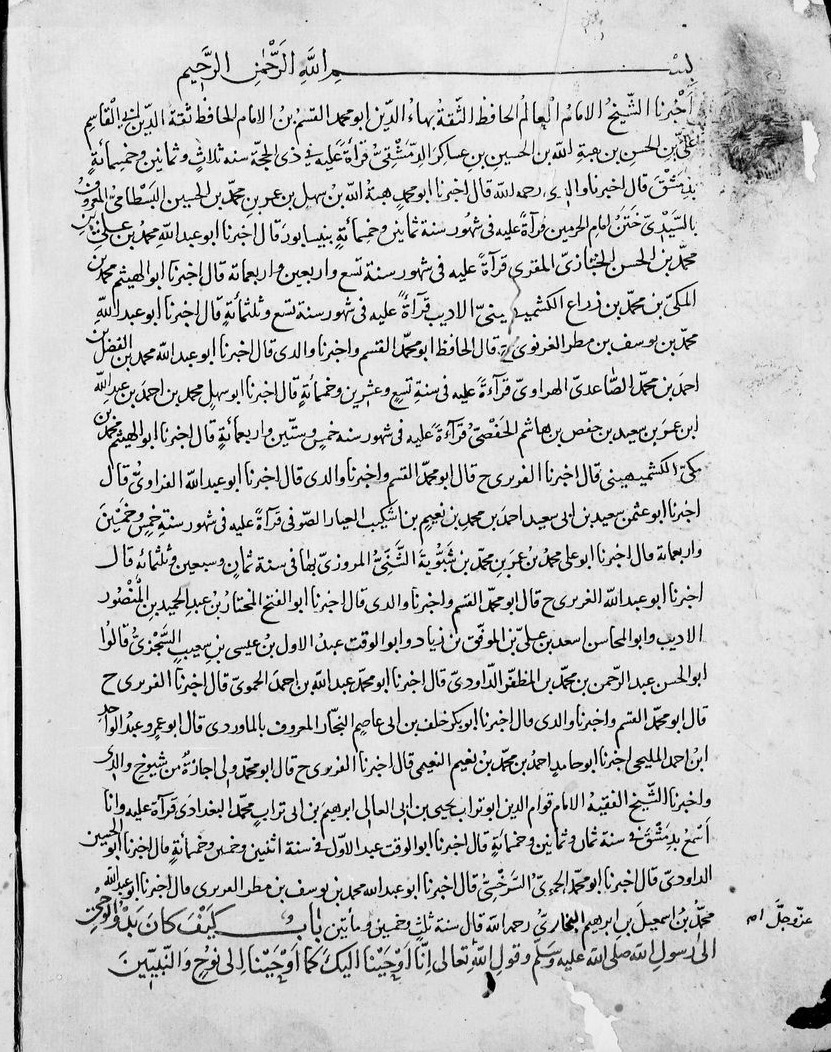
A manuscript of Bukhari containing an Ijazah (transmission license) tracing back to Al-Bukhari, housed in the Princeton University Library, c. 1400

== Commentaries ==
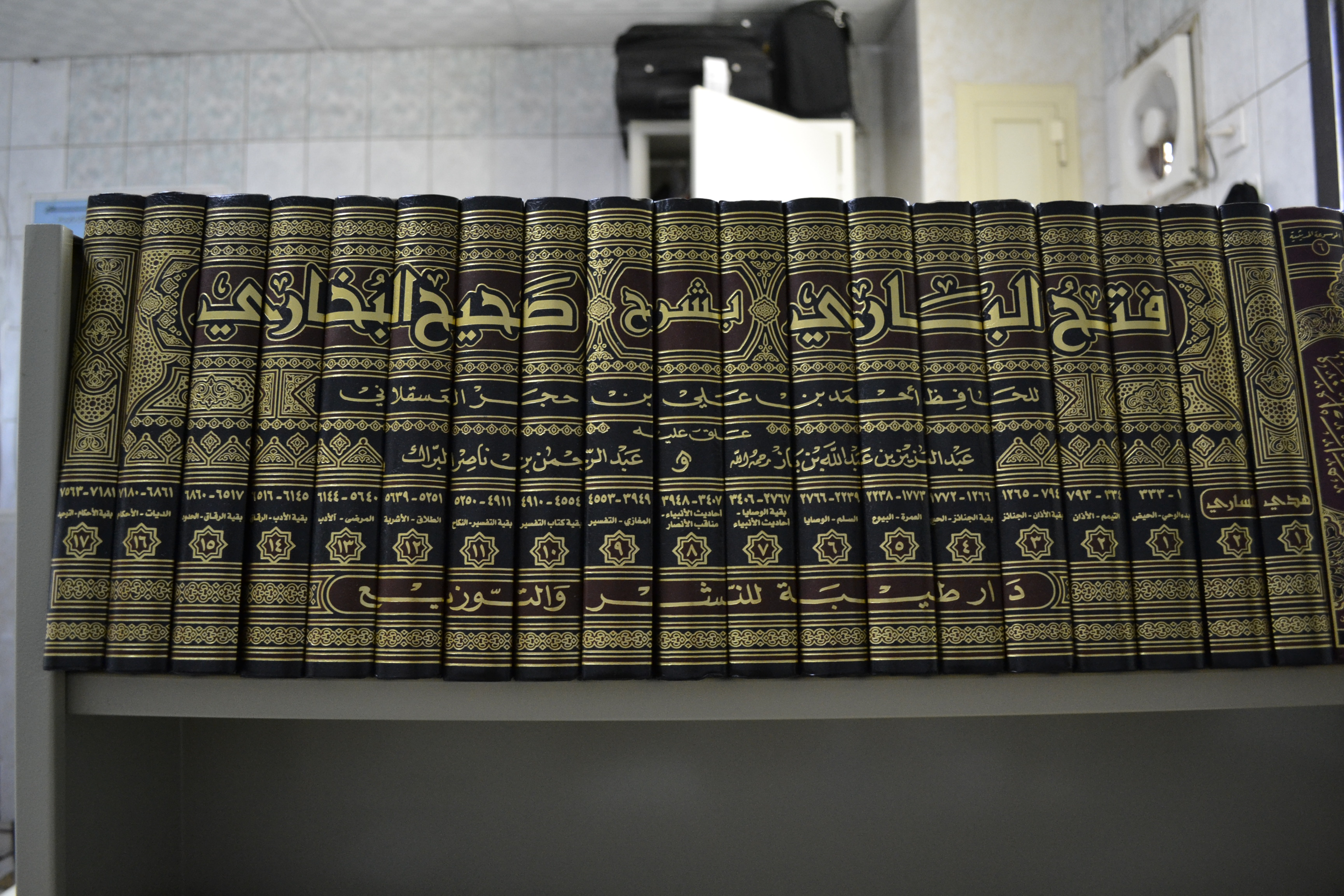
Fath al-Bari by Ibn Hajar al-Asqalani

The number of detailed commentaries on the Sahih are numbered around 400, Ibn Khaldun said: “Explaining Sahih al-Bukhari is a debt owed by this nation.” As a result, numerous scholars have raced to settle this debt over time, and numerous commentaries on Sahih al-Bukhari have been produced.

=== Classical commentaries ===
The six most popular commentaries in history are:

- A'lam al-Sunan by al-Khattabi (d. 998), the earliest commentary on Sahih Bukhari.
- Sharh Ibn Battal by Ibn Battal (d. 1057)
- Al-Kawakib al-Darari by Shams al-Din al-Kirmani (d. 1384).
- Fath al-Bari by Ibn Hajar al-Asqalani (d. 1449)
- Umdat al-Qari by Badr al-Din al-Ayni (d. 1451)
- Irshad al-Sari by Al-Qastallani (d. 1517)

=== Notable Arabic commentaries & annotations (and other works) ===
1. Ikhtisār Ṣaḥīḥ al-Bukhārī wa Bayān Gharībihi, by Al-Qurṭubī (d. 1273).
2. At-Tanqīḥ li Alfāẓ al-Jāmiʿ aṣ-Ṣaḥīḥ, by Al-Zarkashī (d. 1392).
3. Taʿlīqāt al-Qārī ʿalā Thulāthiyyāt al-Bukhārī, by Ali Al-Qārī (d. 1606).
4. Tuḥfat al-Bārī bi Sharḥ Ṣaḥīḥ al-Bukhārī, by Zakariyyā al-Anṣārī (d. 1520).
5. Al-Tawdhih by Ibn al-Mulaqqin (d. 1401).
6. At-Tawshīḥ Sharḥ al-Jāmiʿ aṣ-Ṣaḥīḥ, by Al-Suyūṭī (d. 1505).
7. At-Talkhīṣ Sharḥ Jāmiʿ aṣ-Ṣaḥīḥ li ’l-Bukhārī, by Al-Nawawī (d. 1277).
8. Sharḥ Tarājim Abwāb al-Bukhārī, by Imam Shah Waliyyullāh ad-Dihlawī (d. 1762).
9. ʿAwn al-Bārī bi Ḥalli Adillat al-Bukhārī, by Siddiq Hasan Khan (d. 1890).
10. Fatḥ al-Bārī Sharḥ Ṣaḥīḥ al-Bukhārī, by Imām ibn Rajab al-Hanbalī (d. 1393).
11. An-Nīrayn fī Sharḥ aṣ-Ṣaḥīḥayn by Abū Bakr ibn Al-ʿArabī (d. 1148).
12. Lami al-Darari by Rashid Ahmad Gangohi (d. 1905).
13. Fayd al-Bari by Anwar Shah Kashmiri (d. 1933)

== Name ==
Few scholars have commented on Bukhari's reasons behind naming the chapters in his Sahih, known as tarjumat al-bab. Ibn Hajar is noted to be one of them. Shah Waliullah Dehlawi had mentioned 14 reasons, later modified by Mahmud al-Hasan to make it 15. Zakariyya Kandhlawi is noted to have found as many as 70, even writing a book on the topic Al-Abwab wa al-Tarajim li Sahih al-Bukhari.

== Translations ==
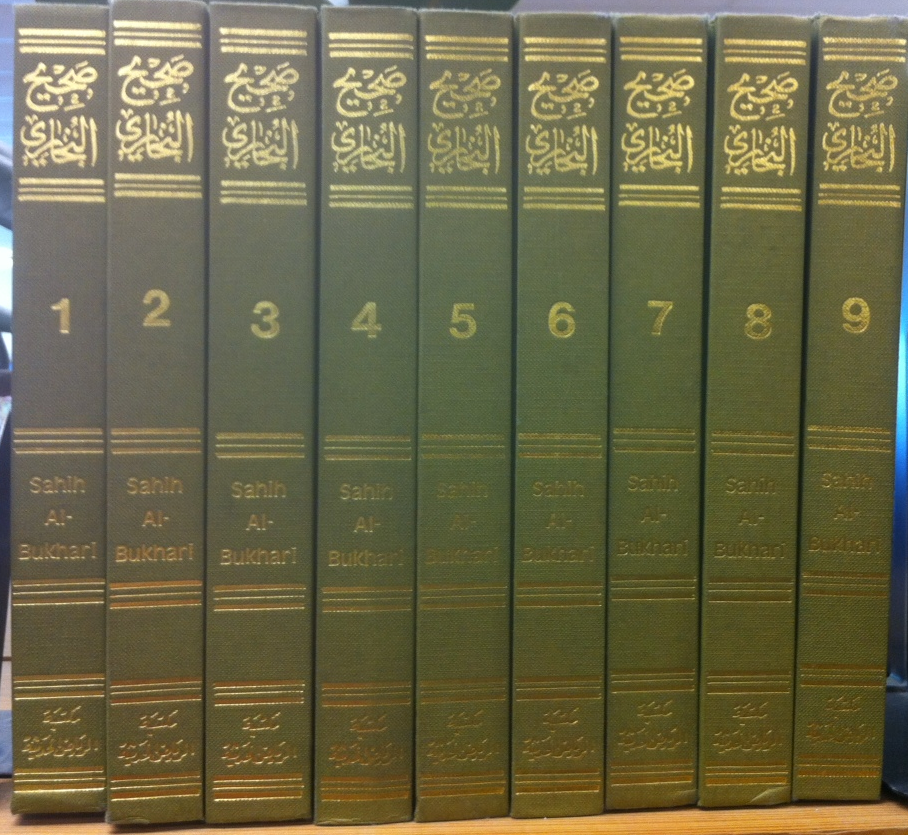
9-volume Sahih al-Bukhari in English

Sahih al-Bukhari was originally translated into English by Muhammad Taqi-ud-Din al-Hilali and Muhammad Muhsin Khan, titled The Translation of the Meanings of Sahih al-Bukhari: Arabic-English (1971), derived from the Arabic text of Fath Al-Bari, published in Egypt. Currently, it is published by Al Saadawi Publications and Darussalam Publishers and is included in the USC-MSA Compendium of Muslim Texts. In 2019, the Arabic Virtual Translation Center in New York City published a new, complete English translation titled Encyclopedia of Sahih Al-Bukhari. Produced by Mohammed Hasan Yousef Arar, this version includes explanatory notes, a comprehensive glossary, and biographies of all the narrators in the isnad (chains of transmission). The final edition was released in February 2025.

Between 1903 and 1914, French orientalists Octave Houdas and William Marçais translated the book into French. Around 1913, Reinfried produced a partial German translation, and in 1935, Muḥammad Esʿad Weis published an English edition with explanatory notes in Kashmiri. In 1928, E. Lévi-Provençal published the Arabic text side-by-side with a French translation. In 1981, Muhammad Hamidullah published a dedicated volume listing errors in Houdas and Marçais's translation, which spanned roughly one-quarter of the book. The book is also available in numerous languages, including Urdu, Bengali, Bosnian, Tamil, Malayalam, Albanian, Malay, and Hindi, among others.

== Reception ==
Some muslims regard Sahih al-Bukhari as one of the two most important books among the Kutub al-Sittah alongside the Sahih Muslim, written by al-Bukhari's student Muslim ibn al-Hajjaj. The two books are known as the Sahihayn ('The Two Sahihs'). Al-Nawawi wrote about Sahih al-Bukhari, "The scholars, may God have mercy on them, have agreed that the most authentic book after the dear Quran are the two Sahihs of Bukhari and Muslim." Siddiq Hasan Khan (died 1890) wrote, "All of the Salaf and Khalaf assert that the most authentic book after the book of Allah is Sahih al-Bukhari and then Sahih Muslim."

In the Introduction to the Science of Hadith, Ibn al-Salah wrote: "The first to author a Sahih was Bukhari [...], followed by Abū al-Ḥusayn Muslim ibn al-Ḥajjāj an-Naysābūrī al-Qushayrī, who was his student, sharing many of the same teachers. These two books are the most authentic books after the Quran. As for the statement of al-Shafi'i, who said, "I do not know of a book containing knowledge more correct than Malik's book [Muwatta Imam Malik]", [...] he said this before the books of Bukhari and Muslim. "The book of Bukhari is the more authentic of the two and more useful." Ibn al-Salah also quoted Bukhari as having said, "I have not included in the book [Sahih al-Bukhari] other than what is authentic and I did not include other authentic hadith for the sake of brevity." In addition, al-Dhahabi quoted Bukhari as having said, "I have memorized one hundred thousand authentic hadith and two hundred thousand which are less than authentic".

Certain prophetic medicine and remedies espoused in Bukhari, such as cupping, have been noted for being unscientific. Hadith scholar Ibn Hajar al-Asqalani, on the basis of archaeological evidence, raised concerns in accepting the hadith at face value which claims that Adam's height was 60 cubits and human height has been decreasing ever since.

In the 2003 book The Idea of Women in Fundamentalist Islam, Lamia Shehadeh used gender studies to critique an ahaad hadith about women's leadership. According to Charles Kurzman, this case raises the question of whether other narrations in Bukhari have been reported incompletely or lack proper context. In 2017, Rachid Aylal, a Quranist, published a book criticizing the Sahih, titled Sahih Al-Bukhari: The End of a Legend. It was banned in Morocco for disturbing spiritual security, due to pressure from Islamists.

On August 29, 2022, Ministry of Justice of the Russian Federation has included Sahih al-Bukhari into the federal list of extremist materials (except containing surahs, ayahs and quotes from the Quran) after the Supreme Court of Tatarstan supported the Laishevo District Court's decision to recognize the Sahih as extremist with its appellate ruling of July 5, 2022.
