= Musa ibn ʿUqba =

Arab Historian and Traditionalist

Imam Musa ibn 'Uqba
- موسى بن عقبة
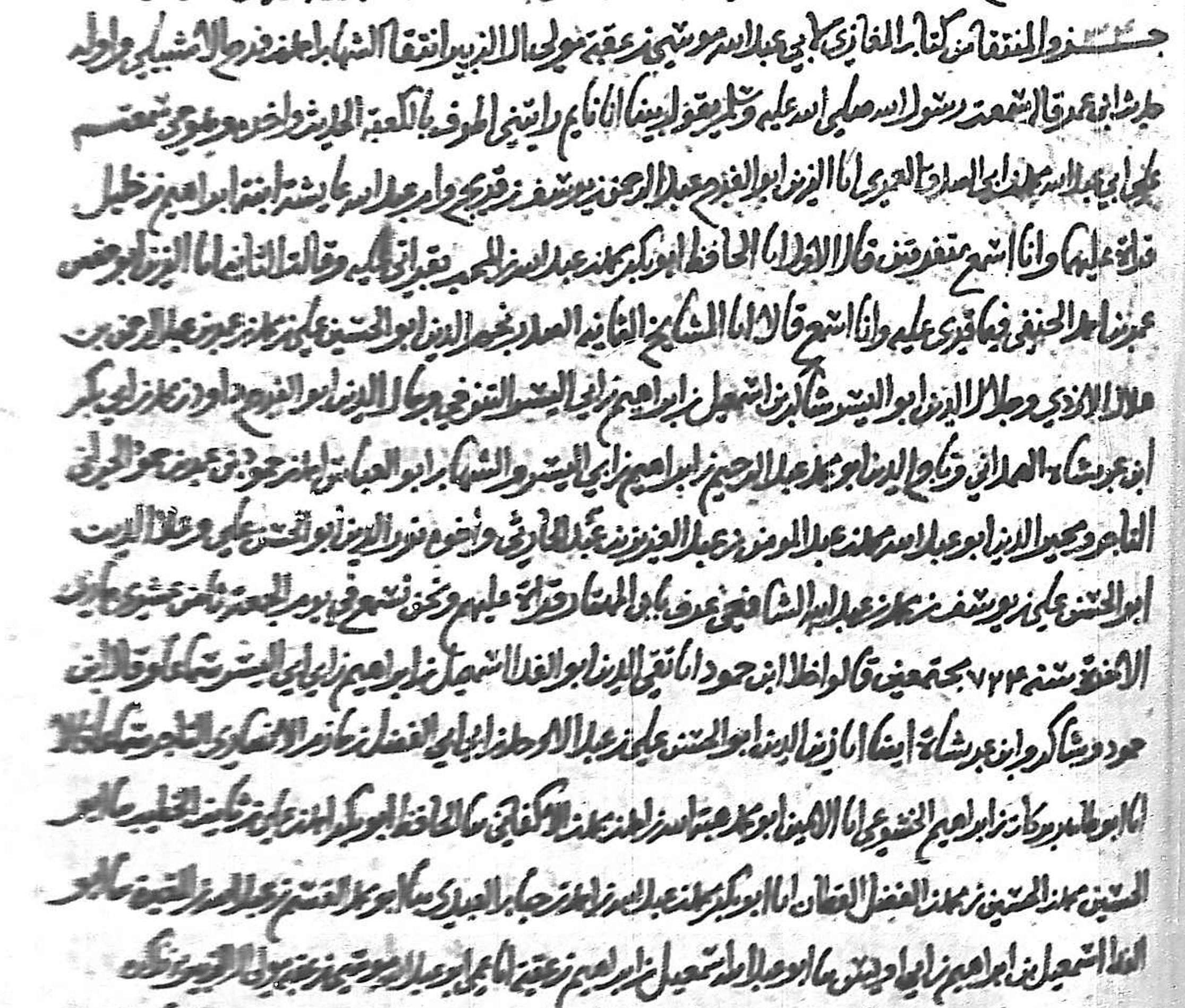
- A Folio from the only known manuscript of Maghāzī Mūsā ibn ʿUqba, discovered in 2021 at the National Library of Tunisia (A-MSS-14033).

Personal life
- Born: c. 55 AH / 674–675 CE Medina, Hejaz, Umayyad Caliphate
- Died: 141 AH / 758–759 CE Medina, Hejaz, Abbasid Caliphate
- Home town: Medina
- Children: Muhammad
- Parent: Uqba bin Abi 'Ayaash al-Asadi (Father)
- Era: Umayyad Caliphate
- Main interest(s): Hadith, Sīrah
- Notable work: Kitab al-Maghazi
- Occupation: Jurist
- Relations: Ibrahim bin 'Uqba (Brother); Muhammad bin 'Uqba (Brother)

Religious life
- Religion: Islam

Muslim leader
- Teacher: Umm Khalid bin Khalid, Ibn Shihab al-Zuhri, Nafi Mawla Ibn Umar, Urwa ibn al-Zubayr, Salim ibn Abd Allah
- Students: Yahya ibn Sa'd, Sufyan ibn ʽUyayna, Ibn Jurayj, Sufyan al-Thawri, Abd Allah ibn al-Mubarak, Malik Ibn Anas, Shu'ba ibn al-Hajjaj
- Influenced by: Ibn Shihab al-Zuhri, Nafi Mawla Ibn Umar
- Influenced: Malik ibn Anas, Sufyan al-Thawri, Sufyan ibn ʽUyayna, Ibn al-Mubarak
- Arabic name
- Personal (Ism): Mūsā موسى
- Patronymic (Nasab): Ibn ʿUqbah ibn Abī ʿAyyāsh عقبة ابن أبي عياش
- Teknonymic (Kunya): Abu Muhammad أبو محمد
- Toponymic (Nisba): Al-Asadī Al-Miṭraqī الأسدي المطرفي

Mūsā ibn ʿUqbah ibn Abī ʿAyyāsh al-Asadi al-Miṭraqī (Arabic: موسى بن عقبة بن أبي عياش الأسدي المطرفي; d. 758/759 CE), commonly known with his honorific as Mūsā ibn ʿUqba ([/ˈmuː.saː ʔibn ʕuq.ba/]), was an early Medinan historian, jurist and traditionalist, a freedman of the family of al-Zubayr, as well as a pupil of Urwa ibn al-Zubayr and al-Zuhri. Imam Malik studied under him and held him in high esteem. Musa was also an expert on maghāzī, the accounts of the Prophet’s military expeditions within on the Sīrah. He composed a maghāzī work long thought became extinct sometime around the 15th to 17th century, but a manuscript containing two-thirds of the book was rediscovered in 2021.

== Biography ==
=== Family background ===
Mūsā appears not to have established his affiliations arbitrarily, but rather in connection with the Banū Asad, of whom he was a mawlā (client).

He is sometimes affiliated directly with the clan of al-Zubayr. His Zubayrid allegiance, a walāʾ ʿitāqah (allegiance by emancipation), was inherited through both his paternal and maternal lines.

Mūsā's father, ʿUqbah ibn Abī ʿAyyāsh al-Asadī, was the mawlā (freedman) of Umm Khālid Amat bint Khālid ibn Saʿd ibn al-ʿĀṣ al-Qurashiyyah al-Umawiyyah, the wife of al-Zubayr ibn al-ʿAwwām. She was also the only female Companion whom Mūsā is recorded to have met, and the only Companion from whom he directly transmitted ḥadīth.

From his mother’s side, she was the daughter of Abū Ḥabībah, the mawlā (freedman) of al-Zubayr and ḥājib (chamberlain) of ʿAbd Allāh ibn al-Zubayr, as well as his emissary to ʿUthmān during the siege before Uthman's Assassination. Mūsā met him and transmitted from him as well.

Just as he narrated from his grandfather, Abū Ḥabībah, he also transmitted from his father, his mother, and his elder brother Muḥammad.

=== Nisba and background ===
As for his nisba, Ibn al-Samʿānī records its pronunciation as Miṭraq, whereas Yāqūt al-Ḥamawī gives it as Muṭriq. Al-Rushātī (d. 1147), citing al-Ḥamdānī (d. 947), notes that Miṭraq was a locality in Yemen. According to Yāqūt (d. 1229), however, it referred to a mountainous region in ʿĀriḍ, al-Yamāmah, extending three days’ journey, corresponding roughly to the area of modern-day Riyadh. The former identification is the stronger view.

=== Life ===
Musa Ibn Uqba was born in Medina. He was the youngest of three brothers, the others being Muhammad and Ibrahim. Musa's date of birth is not explicitly mentioned in any of the biographical works. However, he is recorded as having performed Hajj in the year 68 AH / 687–688 CE. Based on this, it is estimated that he was born around 55 AH / 674–675 CE.

He himself related that he once travelled to al-Ruṣāfah, Iraq, as a young man, where he met the poet Jarīr (d. 728). Introducing himself, he asked Jarīr’s opinion on who was the greater poet, Kuthayyir ʿAzzah or ʿAdī ibn al-Ruqāʿ. Jarīr engaged him in conversation and found him eloquent and agreeable.

He would have customarily studied the Qurʾān, for he is later mentioned among the al-qurrāʾ (Qur'anic reciters). Afterwards, he attended the ḥalqāt (circles of knowledge) in the Prophet’s Mosque. When his family took him along on a pilgrimage, he encountered some of the remaining Companions, as he himself related that he had seen Ibn ʿUmar (d. 693) and Sahl ibn Saʿd al-Sād (d. 710). He later also met Anas ibn Mālik (d. 712).

His two brothers, Ibrāhīm and Muḥammad, the elder of the two, the latter having died earlier, shared with him in study and narration. This joint pursuit of learning eventually led them to hold their own ḥalqat teaching circles in the Prophet’s Mosque. Al-Wāqidī (d. 823) described them as, "they were all jurists and ḥadīth transmitters."

His Kunya was Abu Muhammad, and he also used to issue Fatwas. 202 Hadith are narrated from him in the books of Kutub al-Sittah. Moreover, his ḥadīths were collected independently by Muḥammad ibn Ismāʿīl ibn Mihrān al-Nīsābūrī, better known as al-Ismāʿīlī (d. 903), though this compilation has not survived.

During the reign of Walid ibn Abd al-Malik (r. 705–715), he participated in many military expeditions against the Byzantine Empire alongside Salim ibn Abd Allah. He is also recorded to have heard hadith from Ibn Muḥayrīz in Al-Ramla, Palestine.

=== Death ===
The majority of scholars recorded Mūsa's death as having occurred in 141 AH / 758–759 CE in Medina.

Khalifa ibn Khayyat (d. 854), in one of his two statements, and Ibn Hibban (d. 884) placed his death earlier in the year 135 AH / 752–753 CE. However, Ibn Ḥibbān later revised his view, aligning with the majority opinion that it occurred in 141 AH / 758–759 CE.

Ibn Asakir transmitted from Nūḥ ibn Ḥabīb (d. 856) the report that Mūsā died in 142 AH / 759–760 CE; however, the report was deemed Shādh (anomalous) by Dhahabi.

== Works ==
=== Maghazi Musa Ibn Uqba ===
"The book of Musa ibn 'Uqba is sufficient for you, for he is trustworthy."

— Ahmad Ibn Hanbal

He composed one of the earliest Sīrah books, Kitāb al-maghāzī or better known as Maghazi Musa Ibn Uqba. It was praised by early Muslims, including Malik ibn Anas, Al-Shafi'i, Yahya ibn Ma'in, Ahmad ibn Hanbal, as well as later Muslims such as Al-Bayhaqi, Al-Dhahabi and Ibn Hajar al-Asqalani, who heavily relied upon and quoted his work.

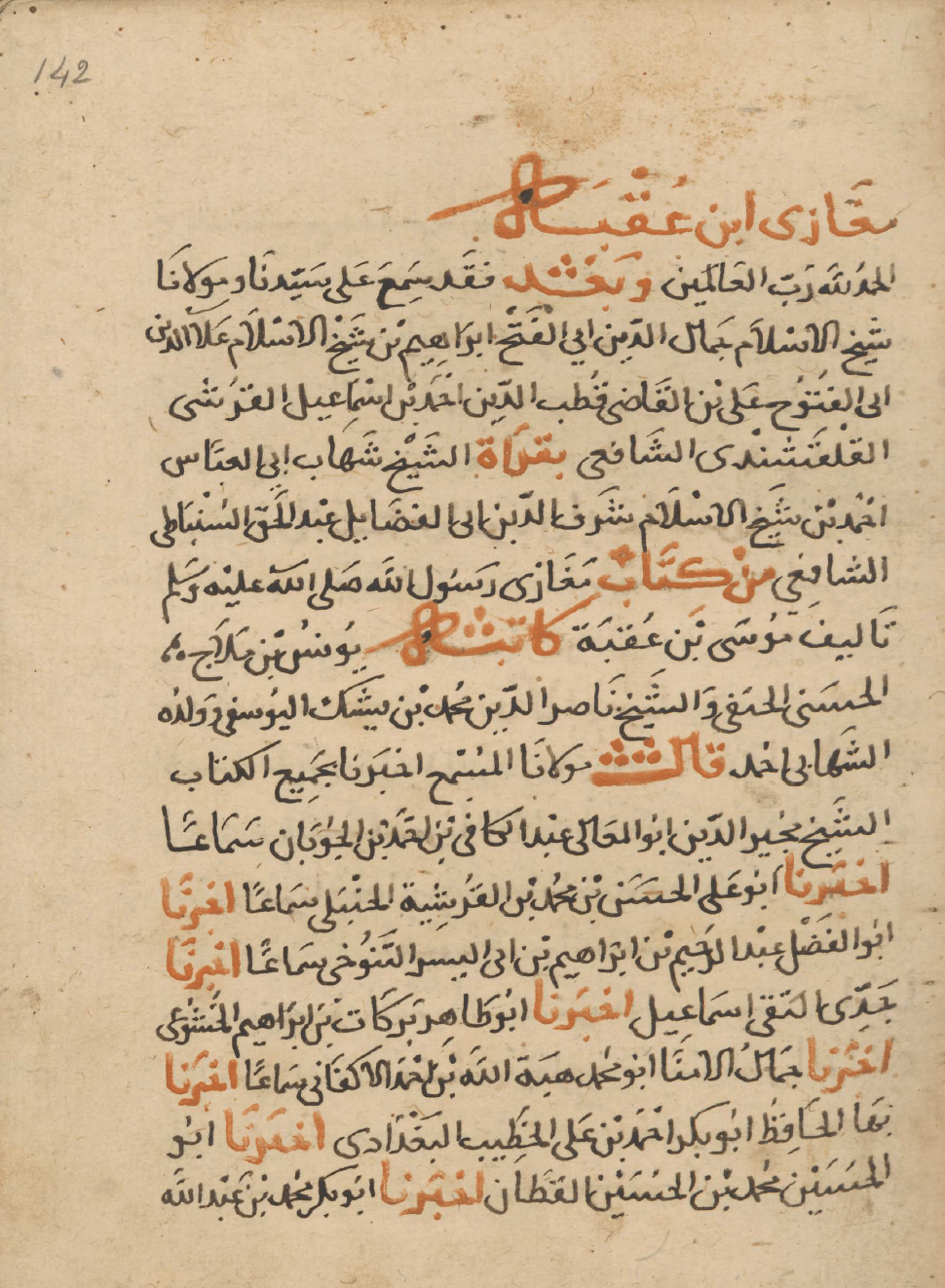
An ijāzah (license of transmission) for the Maghāzī granted by al-Qalqashandī (d. 1418) to his students, indicating that the work remained in circulation until at least the 15th century.

One of the stated reasons for Musa writing his Maghāzī was his intention to prevent the portrayal of those lacking virtue as people of merit. It is reported that when Musa heard that in the Maghāzī of Shurahbīl bin Sa'd (d. 123/740), individuals who had not participated in the Battles of Badr and Uhud were portrayed as if they had, he became upset with Shurahbīl's handling of the reports and began to record his own narrations related to the Maghāzī.

The Maghāzī of Mūsā ibn ʿUqba was transmitted through two principal narrators: his nephew Ismā'īl ibn Ibrāhīm ibn 'Uqba and his student Muḥammad ibn Fulayḥ ibn Sulaymān al-Aslamī. Both transmissions became widespread, and by the 12th century, both transmissions had reached Al-Andalus, one of the farthest regions of the Islamic world. According to 'Alā'ī bin Kaykaldī (d. 761/1359), the two transmissions only differed in the orthography of a few words.

However, the entire work became extinct sometime during the 15th century to the 17th century. Nuh Arslantaş identifies Al-Sakhawi (d. 1497) as the last verifiable individual to have access to the Maghazi. According to Marsden Jones, historian Al-Diyārabakrī (d. 1582) also had access to it, though the claim is disputed. Recently, Muḥammad al-Ṭabarānī claimed that the hadith scholar Muhammad al-Rudani (d. 1683) represents the final known link in its transmission.

An excerpt of the Maghāzī, comprising twenty hadiths drawn from various sections of the work, was compiled by the hadith scholar al-Shihāb Aḥmad ibn Farḥ al-Ishbīlī (d. 1300). A manuscript copy containing eighteen hadiths is preserved in the Berlin Library as part of a bound collection. The excerpt was first edited and published with a German translation by the orientalist Carl Eduard Sachau in 1904.

In 1992, the work was re-edited by Mashhūr ibn Ḥasan Āl Salmān; however, it was erroneously attributed to one of its transmitters, al-Jamāl Yūsuf ibn al-Shams Muḥammad ibn ʿUmar ibn Qāḍī Shuhbah (d. 1387). This misattribution subsequently became widespread among later researchers.

Partial reconstructions of the Maghāzī were attempted through earlier citations by scholars, notably by 'Abdu Braimah (1968), Muḥammad Bāqshīsh Abū Mālik (1994), and Ḥusayn Murādī Naṣab (2003).

In September 2021, the book was rediscovered when a manuscript (Note: Currently catalogued as A-MSS-14033; formerly MS 14032 and MS 14033) was found in the National Library of Tunisia, according to the transmission of Ismā'īl ibn Ibrāhīm ibn 'Uqba. It contains approximately two-thirds of the book, beginning from change in the Qibla to the Farewell Pilgrimage. The rest of the work still remains lost.

In 2023, the book was published for the first time by Bashīr Bin'aṭiyyah Publications in Fez, Morocco. English translations were followed in the following years. In 2025, Dar al-Arqam published the book with reconstructions of the lost sections from earlier citations.
