= Abd al-Razzaq al-San'ani =

Yemeni hadith scholar (744–827 CE)

Shaykh al-Islām; Imam; Mufti; Abd al-Razzaq al-San'ani
- عبد الرزاق الصنعاني
- Title: Muhaddith al-Waqt (lit. ''The Muhaddith of the era''); Hafiz (lit. ''Memorizer'')

Personal life
- Born: 126 AH / 743–4 CE Sanaa, Yemen. Umayyad Caliphate
- Died: Mid Shawwal 211 AH / Mid-January 827 CE (aged 81–82) Sanaa, Yemen. Abbasid Caliphate
- Home town: Sanaa
- Children: Abu Bakr
- Parent: Hammām ibn Nāfiʿ al-Ḥimyarī al-Ṣanʿānī (father)
- Era: Abbasid era
- Main interests: Jurisprudence; hadith; exegesis; Sīrah
- Notable work: al-Musannaf

Religious life
- Religion: Islam
- Denomination: Sunni
- Jurisprudence: Independent

Muslim leader
- Teacher: Ma'mar ibn Rashid, Ibn Jurayj, Sufyan al-Thawri, Sufyan ibn ʽUyaynah, Abu Hanifa, Malik ibn Anas, Abd al-Rahman al-Awza'i, Al-Fudayl ibn Iyad, Abdullah ibn Mubarak, Abu Ma'shar al-Sindi, Abu Bakr Ibn Ayyash.
- Influenced by: Ma'mar ibn Rashid, Ibn Jurayj, Sufyan al-Thawri, Sufyan ibn ʽUyaynah, Abu Hanifa
- Influenced: Ahmad ibn Hanbal, Ali ibn al-Madini, Yaḥya ibn Maʻin
- Arabic name
- Personal (Ism): ʿAbd al-Razzāq عَبْدُ ٱلرَّزَّاقِ
- Patronymic (Nasab): ibn Hammām ibn Nāfiʿ ابْنُ هَمَّامِ بْنِ نَافِعٍ
- Teknonymic (Kunya): Abū Bakr أَبُو بَكْرٍ
- Toponymic (Nisba): al-Ḥimyarī al-Yamānī al-Ṣanʿānī ٱلْحِمْيَرِيُّ ٱلْيَمَانِيُّ ٱلصَّنْعَانِيُّ

Abd al-Razzaq ibn Hammam ibn Nafi' al-San'ani (Arabic: عبد الرزاق بن همام بن نافع الصنعاني, romanized: ʿAbd al-Razzāq ibn Hammām ibn Nāfiʿ al-Ṣanʿānī, 744 – January 827 CE, 126–211 AH), was a prominent early Muslim hadith scholar, jurist, and author from Yemen. He became widely recognized as one of the foremost transmitters of hadith in the second/eighth century, with a scholarly network spanning Yemen, the Hijaz, Iraq, and Syria. His reputation is especially tied to his monumental compilation al-Muṣannaf, which preserves around 22,000 hadiths and remains one of the earliest and most comprehensive collections of Islamic tradition.

Abd al-Razzaq studied extensively with leading scholars such as Maʿmar ibn Rāshid, Ibn Jurayj, Sufyān al-Thawrī, Mālik ibn Anas and under Abu Hanifa. By the end of the second Islamic century, he had become the preeminent scholar of Yemen, attracting numerous students including Aḥmad ibn Ḥanbal and Yaḥyā ibn Maʿīn. His works encompassed hadith, Qurʾanic exegesis, and historical writings, though several have been lost.

== Biography ==
=== Name and family background ===
Abd al-Razzaq al-San'ani was a mawlā (client) of the tribe of Banu Ḥimyar. His nisba al-Ṣanʿānī, refers to the city of Sanaa in Yemen. The letter nūn is before the letter Aleph is optional and can also be pronounced as Ṣanʿāʾī.

His grandfather Nāfiʿ and her sister were slaves of Ibn Abbas. They were later purchased by Ibn Mughith, who retained the sister and freed his grandfather Nāfiʿ. Thus, he was his freed-client through manumission. His father was a Persian while his mother was Yemeni and he is thus counted among the Al-Abna'.

His father, Hammām ibn Nāfiʿ al-Ḥimyarī al-Ṣanʿānī, lived during the era of the Tabi'un and heard narrations from Wahb ibn Munabbih and Ikrimah. He was counted among the people of devout worshippers of Yemen and is reported to have performed the pilgrimage sixty times. His Uncle Wahb ibn Nāfiʿand his brother Abd al-Wahhab ibn Hammam were both narrators of hadith.

=== Early life and education ===
Abd al-Razzaq was born in the year 126 AH / 743-4 CE in Sanaa, Yemen. Abd al-Razzaq received his training as a scholar in hometown Sanaa, where he became a student of Ma'mar ibn Rashid studying with him for eight to nine years. Abd al-Razzaq later fondly recalled that Ma'mar would feed him the fruit of the myrobalanus plant, presumably as a means to sharpen his memory. Abd al-Razzaq attended the study circles of a number of visiting scholars in Sanaa, including the Meccans Ibn Jurayj and Sufyan ibn ʽUyaynah, and the Kufan Sufyan al-Thawri. It was during his trips to Syria on business and probably during the Hajj to Mecca that Abd al-Razzaq came into contact and studied with many eminent scholars of the middle of the second/eighth century.

Al-Mizzi counted approximately sixty teachers whom he narrated hadith from and 103 students who narrated hadith from him. Among his main teachers were Ma'mar ibn Rashid, Ibn Jurayj, Sufyan al-Thawri, Sufyan ibn ʽUyaynah, Abu Hanifa, Malik ibn Anas, Abd al-Rahman al-Awza'i, Al-Fudayl ibn Iyad, Abdullah ibn Mubarak, Abu Ma'shar al-Sindi and Abu Bakr Ibn Ayyash.

=== Later life ===
In the last quarter of the second/eighth century, Abd al-Razzaq became the leading scholar of Yemen, attracting students from all parts of the Muslim world, including Yahya ibn Ma'in and Ahmad ibn Hanbal. Abd al-Razzaq's reputation was based primarily on his books.

Ali al-Qari listed him among the followers of the Hanafi school. However, a study of selected passages in his al-Muṣannaf, in which he explicitly stated his own preferences or cited the views of others on legal questions, concluded that Abd al-Razzaq exhibited a distinct juristic outlook. He held independent opinions that did not necessarily coincide with the legal schools of his teachers.

=== Death ===
Abd al-Razzaq became blind by the end of his life sometime after the year 200 AH / 815-816 CE. He died in Sanaa, Yemen in the middle of Shawwal in the year 211 AH / Mid-January 827 CE.

== Works ==
Beside authoring works, he transmitted the Sahifat Hammam ibn Munabbih, the earliest surviving hadith collection, from his teacher Ma'mar ibn Rashid from Hammam ibn Munabbih. Abd al-Razzaq also produced a recension of Kitāb al-Maghāzi (The Expeditions) by his teacher Ma'mar ibn Rashid. His list of works are:

- al-Muṣannaf Abd al-Razzaq's most important work is al-Muṣannaf, often referred to as Musannaf ʿAbd al-Razzāq. It is also known by the titles al-Jāmiʿ ('The Comprehensive Collection') and al-Jāmiʿ al-Kabīr ('The Great Comprehensive Collection'). The compilation contains approximately of 22,000 hadiths. The modern edition of al-Muṣannaf is based on several transmissions of the work that have been collated.
- al-Tafsīr

An exegesis of the Quran. While it spans the whole Quran, it treats only selected words or phrases. Versteegh believes the objective was simply to produce an anthology of opinions about some words and verses, rather than analysis of the Quranic text.

- Al-Amālī fī Āthār al-Ṣaḥābah ('The Dictations concerning the Traditions of the Companions')

The work survives only partially and has been published by Dār al-Rushd for Publishing and Distribution (Riyadh), edited by Dr. Muṣṭafā Muslim Muḥammad, 1st edition, 1410 AH / 1989 CE.

- Al-Maghāzī

A work titled al-Maghāzī is attributed to Abd al-Razzaq and is mentioned by Ibn al-Nadim, Ibn al-Samani, Ibn Khayr and al-Sakhawi among his writings. However, according to Ibn Khayr, this was not an independent book but rather the Kitāb al-Maghāzī section within his al-Muṣannaf.

- Kitāb al-Ṣalāh ('The Book of Prayers)

Lost Work

- Tārīkh ('History')

Cited by Ahmad ibn Hanbal. Lost Work

- Ikhtilāf al-Nās fī al-Fiqh ('The Differences Among People Regarding Jurisprudence')

Lost Work
