= Yahya ibn Sa'id al-Qattan =

Eighth-century Basran hadith scholar (738–813)

- يحيى بن سعيد القطان

Personal life
- Born: 120 AH/738 CE Basra, Umayyad Caliphate
- Died: 198 AH/813 CE Basra, Abbasid Caliphate
- Main interest(s): Hadith, biographical evaluation

Religious life
- Religion: Islam
- Denomination: Sunni
- Jurisprudence: Hanafi-Mujtahid

Muslim leader
- Students: Ahmad ibn Hanbal, Ali ibn al-Madini, Yahya ibn Ma'in, Ishaq ibn Rahwayh
- Influenced by: Abu Hanifa, Sufyan al-Thawri, Shu'ba ibn al-Hajjaj, al-Awza'i, Ibn Jurayj
- Arabic name
- Personal (Ism): Yaḥyā يَحْيَىٰ
- Patronymic (Nasab): Ibn Saʿīd ibn Farrūkh ٱبْن سَعِيد ٱبْن فَرُّوخ
- Teknonymic (Kunya): Abū Saʿīd أَبُو سَعِيد
- Epithet (Laqab): Al-Qaṭṭān ٱلْقَطَّان
- Toponymic (Nisba): Al-Baṣrī ٱلْبَصْرِيّ

Yahya ibn Sa'id al-Qattan (Arabic: يحيى بن سعيد القطان, romanized: Yaḥyā ibn Saʿīd al-Qaṭṭān; 120 AH/738 CE – 198 AH/813 CE) was a Basran hadith scholar of the tabi' al-tabi'in who is considered a progenitor of Sunni hadith criticism.

== Biography ==
Yahya ibn Sa'id was born in Basra in 120 AH/738 CE to descendants of freed slaves from Banu Tamim; his work in the cotton trade earned him the nisba al-Qattan. He travelled to Medina, Baghdad and Kufa in pursuit of hadith. He audited the lessons of Shu'ba ibn al-Hajjaj for twenty years, as well as those of Sufyan al-Thawri. His other teachers included the grammarian Hammad ibn Salamah, the jurists Malik ibn Anas and al-Awza'i, and Ibn Jurayj, a substantial proportion of whose extant biographical information has been transmitted through al-Qattan. His own students included Ahmad ibn Hanbal, Ali ibn al-Madini, Yahya ibn Ma'in, and Ishaq ibn Rahwayh. He reportedly authored two works which have not survived: al-Ḍuʿafā, a book of unreliable hadith narrators, and Kitāb al-Maghāzī. Ibn Sa'id died in Basra in 198 AH/813 CE.

== Views ==
Ibn Sa'id was critical of hadith that he transmitted without a sahabi narrator (i.e., mursal hadith), and identified tadlīs performed by hadith narrators regardless of their stature, including his teacher and celebrated jurist Sufyan al-Thawri. He was known for his strict standards in biographical evaluation. He deemed several ascetics and Sufis as unreliable narrators and was sceptical of hadith transmitted through them. A famous statement that can be plausibly attributed to Ibn Sa'id through isnad-cum-matn analysis comments on how the pious (al-ṣāliḥīn) were most dishonest in matters of hadith, which has been adduced as evidence of hadith forgery among some early Muslims.
