= Ibn Manzar =

8th-century narrator of hadith

Ibn Manzar (Arabic: ابن منذر) was an 8th-century narrator of hadith.

He transmitted hadith from:

- Ata ibn Abi Rabah

His hadith were quoted by

- ‘Abd ar-Razzaq as-San‘ani

== See also ==
- List of Islamic scholars
