= Ibn Shihab al-Zuhri =

Arab jurist and scholar (677/78-741/42)

Imam Ibn Shihab az-Zuhri
- ٱبۡن شِهَاب ٱلزُّهْرِيّ

Personal life
- Born: between 49 AH (669/670 CE) and 53 AH (672/673 CE) Medina, Umayyad Caliphate
- Died: 123 AH (740/741 CE) or 124 AH (741/742 CE) Shaghb wa-Bada, Umayyad Caliphate
- Region: Syria, Hejaz
- Main interest(s): Hadith, prophetic biography, fiqh
- Relations: Abd Allah ibn Muslim al-Zuhri (brother)

Religious life
- Religion: Islam

Muslim leader
- Influenced by: Urwah ibn Zubayr, Said ibn al-Musayyib, Ubayd-Allah ibn Abd-Allah, Abu Salama ibn Abd al-Rahman ibn Awf
- Influenced: Malik ibn Anas, Ibn Ishaq, Ma'mar ibn Rashid, Umar II, Ibn Jurayj, Sufyan ibn Uyaynah, Al-Waqidi
- Arabic name
- Personal (Ism): Muḥammad (مُحَمَّد)
- Patronymic (Nasab): Ibn Muslim ibn ʿUbayd Allāh ibn ʿAbd Allāh ibn S̲h̲ihāb (بۡن مُسْلِمِ بۡنِ عُبَيْدِ ٱللهِ بۡنِ عَبۡد ٱللهِ بۡن شِهَابِ)
- Teknonymic (Kunya): Abū Bakr (أَبُو بَكْرٍ)
- Toponymic (Nisba): al-Zuhrī (ٱلزُّهْرِيّ)

Abū Bakr Muhammad ibn Muslim ibn Ubayd Allah ibn Abd Allah ibn Shihab al-Zuhri (Arabic: أَبُو بَكْرٍ مُحَمَّدُ بنُ مُسْلِمَ بنِ عُبَیْدِ ٱللهِ بنِ عَبدِ ٱللهِ بنِ شِهَابٍ ٱلزُّهْرِيّ, romanized: Abu Bakr Muḥammad ibn Muslim ibn Ubayd Allāh ibn Abd Allāh b. S̲h̲ihāb az-Zuhrī; died 124 AH/741-2 CE), also referred to as Ibn Shihab or az-Zuhri, was a tabi'i Arab jurist and traditionist credited with pioneering the development of sīra-maghazi and hadith literature.

Raised in Medina, he studied hadith and maghazi under Medinese traditionists before rising to prominence at the Umayyad court, where he served in a number of religious and administrative positions. He transmitted several thousand hadith included in the six canonical Sunni hadith collections and his work on maghazi forms the basis of the extant biographies of Muhammad. His relationship with the Umayyads has been debated by both early and modern Sunnis, Shias and Western orientalists.

== Biography ==
=== Early life and career ===
Muhammad ibn Muslim az-Zuhri was born c. 58 AH (677/678 CE) in the city of Medina. His father Muslim was a supporter of the Zubayrids during the Second Fitna, while his great-grandfather Abd Allah fought against Muhammad at the Battle of Uhud before converting to Islam.

Despite hailing from the Banu Zuhrah — a clan of Quraysh — Zuhri's early life was characterised by poverty, and he served as the breadwinner for his family. As a youth, Zuhri enjoyed studying poetry and genealogy, and possessed an excellent memory which enabled him in this pursuit. He consumed honey syrup in a bid to sharpen it further, and wrote voluminous notes on slates and parchment to aid with memory recall.

Dedicating himself to the study of hadith and maghazi narrations in his twenties, he studied under the Medinese scholars Said ibn al-Musayyib, Urwah ibn Zubayr, Ubayd-Allah ibn Abd-Allah and Abu Salamah, the son of Abd al-Rahman ibn Awf. He referred to them as four "oceans of knowledge". Using the traditions that were transmitted to him, Zuhri compiled a maghazi work of which fragments can be found in the writings of his students Ibn Ishaq and Ma'mar ibn Rashid. He may have been the first to combine multiple maghazi reports into one to produce a single, coherent narrative with collective chains of narration - a technique later used by Ishaq and Al-Waqidi.

==== Encounter with Abd al-Malik ====
In the account of the 9th-century Shia historian Ya'qubi, a teenage Zuhri was taken to caliph Abd al-Malik (r. 685–705) while visiting Damascus in c. 72 AH (691/692 CE). The caliph sought to prevent the Syrians from performing the Hajj in Mecca, which was controlled by the Zubayrids. Adducing a hadith from Zuhri that permitted pilgrimage to Jerusalem, Abd al-Malik ordered the construction of the Dome of the Rock to serve as a site for a substitute pilgrimage.

Ignác Goldziher states that Zuhri fabricated the hadith at the behest of the caliph. However, the historicity of the encounter has been disputed by Muhammad Mustafa al-Azami, Nabia Abbott and Harald Motzki, as Zuhri was then a young and unknown figure, others also transmitted the hadith and his source Said ibn al-Musayyib would not consent to his name being used in a forgery.

=== Patronage by the Umayyads ===
As his stature as a scholar grew, Zuhri came to the attention of the Umayyads. He enjoyed the patronage of Abd al-Malik after being introduced to him in c. 82 AH (701/702 CE) and of his successor al-Walid I (r. 705–715).

Zuhri's study circle was praised by the deeply religious Umar II (r. 717–720), who was engaged in scholarly pursuits in Medina. Upon his accession, he ordered prominent traditionists to commit their hadith to writing as part of his vision to codify the sunnah. Zuhri was tasked with compiling their manuscripts into books, copies of which were sent to cities throughout the caliphate.

During the reign of Yazid II (r. 720–724), Zuhri accepted an offer of judgeship from the caliph. He also served the Umayyads as a tax collector and as a member of the shurta.

Hisham (r. 724–743) employed Zuhri as a tutor for his sons, permitting him to live at the court in Resafa. There, Hisham compelled Zuhri to write down hadith for the young Umayyad princes - a move that troubled the scholar, who was opposed to the practice. He later complained about the coercion, adding "Now that the rulers have written it [hadith], I am ashamed I do not write it for anyone else but them." Zuhri remained at Resafa for the next two decades, where he continued to teach new students and hold lectures in which he transmitted hadith.

=== Retirement and death ===
Toward the end of his life, Zuhri retired to an estate granted to him by the Umayyads in Shaghb wa-Bada, located on the border of the Hejaz and Palestine. He died from illness in 124 AH/741-2 CE. In his will, he designated the estate as sadaqah and requested to be buried in the middle of a nearby road so that passers-by could pray for him. His grave was visited by al-Husayn ibn al-Mutawakkil al-Asqalani, who described it as being raised and plastered with white gypsum.

== Students ==
Alongside the casual attendees of his lectures, Zuhri taught at least two dozen regular students. These included:

- Ibn Ishaq
- Malik ibn Anas
- Sufyan ibn ʽUyaynah
- Uqail ibn Khalid
- Ma'mar ibn Rashid
- Yunus ibn Yazid al-Aili
- Muhammad ibn al-Walid az-Zubaidi
- Shu'aib ibn Dinar

== Relationship with the Umayyads ==
=== Views of Zuhri's contemporaries ===
According to Israeli writer Michael Lecker, al-Zuhri's attachment to the Umayyad court was said to be negatively perceived by a number of his contemporaries. A statement attributed to Malik ibn Anas criticises al-Zuhri for using his religious knowledge for worldly gain, while Yaḥya ibn Maʻin is said to have forbade comparisons of him with al-A’mash as he "served in the administration of the Umayyads". Others defended his integrity: Amr ibn Dinar implied Zuhri had no desire to forge traditions for the Umayyads, even in exchange for bribes. Similarly, Abd al-Rahman al-Awza'i stated that al-Zuhri did not seek to appease the authorities. In addition, Ma'mar ibn Rashid quotes al-Zuhri as laughing at the Umayyads' claim that Uthman, a member of the Banu Umayya, signed the Treaty of Hudaybiyyah rather than Ali.

=== Views of modern scholarship ===
The exact nature of Zuhri's relationship with the Umayyads has been debated by modern scholars. In Goldziher's view, Zuhri was a pious scholar who was nonetheless compelled, if not willing, to forge traditions for them. In contrast, Muhammad Mustafa al-Azami and Abd al-Aziz Duri argue for the independence of Zuhri. They cite instances where he refused to falsely answer religious questions in a manner that would benefit the Umayyads, and an incident where he threatened to kill a young al-Walid II, who he tutored, for his bad manners. Michael Lecker argues against attempts to dissociate him from the Umayyads, but suggests he earned a degree of freedom within the court.

== Legacy ==
=== Influence on hadith and maghazi-sirah literature ===
Zuhri's traditions and fiqh opinions were transmitted by his students and are included in Sunni hadith corpus. Zuhri is cited as an informant for approximately 3,500 narrations in the six canonical Sunni hadith collections. Malik ibn Anas refers to Zuhri for 21% of the traditions in his Muwatta, while Ma'mar ibn Rashid and Ibn Jurayj refer to Zuhri for 28% and 6% of the traditions in their respective corpora in the Musannaf of Abd al-Razzaq. Ma'mar and Ibn Ishaq, both students of Zuhri, rely heavily on their teacher's traditions in their respective prophetic biographies. Ma'mar's Kitab al-Maghazi relies heavily on maghazi traditions transmitted during Zuhri's lectures, as does Ibn Ishaq's Sirat Rasul Allah, although the latter also includes large amounts of material from popular storytellers and Biblical accounts.

=== Sunni view ===
Ibn Shihab az-Zuhri is regarded as one of the greatest Sunni authorities on Hadith. The leading scholars of Hadith such as Malik ibn Anas, Ibn al-Madini, Ahmad bin Hanbal, Abu Hatim, Ibn Hibban, Al-Dhahabi and Ibn Hajar al-Asqalani are all agreed upon his indisputable authority. He received ahadith from many Sahaba (Companions) and numerous scholars among the first and second generations after the Companions narrated from him. Imam Zuhri prepared a collection of Hadith under the orders of the Umayyad ruler of the time. Copies of this collection were sent by the ruler to all the Islamic countries. From that time on the collection of Hadith became common. Necessary to mention here that the manner in which he collected Hadith. He went to the house of every Ansar in Medina for this purpose.

=== Shia view ===
Shia scholars specialising in biographical evaluation hold differing assessments of Zuhri. Due to his service for the Umayyads, Shaykh Tusi, Allamah Al-Hilli and Muhammad Baqir al-Majlisi considered him a Sunni and an enemy of the Ahl al-Bayt; the latter grading him as a da'if transmitter. Despite this, Tusi includes traditions from Zuhri in his collections Tahdhib al-Ahkam and Al-Istibsar. Abu al-Qasim al-Khoei and Muhammad Taqi Shushtari view Zuhri as a pro-Alid Sunni based on an account of him seeking the counsel of Ali ibn Husayn Zayn al-Abidin after accidentally killing a person. For the same reason, a third group, including Muhammad Taqi Majlisi, maintains Zuhri was a Shia and that his traditions are authentic (sahih).

== Early Islamic scholars ==
Early Islamic scholars

Muhammad, The final Messenger of God (570–632) the Constitution of Medina, taught the Quran, and advised his companions
Abdullah ibn Masud (died 653) taught	Ali (607–661) fourth caliph taught	Aisha, Muhammad's wife and Abu Bakr's daughter taught	Abd Allah ibn Abbas (618–687) taught	Zayd ibn Thabit (610–660) taught	Umar (579–644) second caliph taught	Abu Hurairah (603–681) taught
Alqama ibn Qays (died 681) taught	Husayn ibn Ali (626–680) taught	Qasim ibn Muhammad ibn Abi Bakr (657–725) taught and raised by Aisha	Urwah ibn Zubayr (died 713) taught by Aisha, he then taught	Said ibn al-Musayyib (637–715) taught	Abdullah ibn Umar (614–693) taught	Abd Allah ibn al-Zubayr (624–692) taught by Aisha, he then taught
Ibrahim al-Nakha’i taught	Ali ibn Husayn Zayn al-Abidin (659–712) taught	Hisham ibn Urwah (667–772) taught	Ibn Shihab al-Zuhri (died 741) taught	Salim ibn Abd-Allah ibn Umar taught	Umar ibn Abdul Aziz (682–720) raised and taught by Abdullah ibn Umar
Hammad ibn Abi Sulayman taught	Muhammad al-Baqir (676–733) taught	Farwah bint al-Qasim Jafar's mother
Abu Hanifa (699–767) wrote Al Fiqh Al Akbar and Kitab Al-Athar, jurisprudence followed by Sunni, Sunni Sufi, Barelvi, Deobandi, Zaidiyyah and originally by the Fatimid and taught	Zayd ibn Ali (695–740)	Ja'far bin Muhammad Al-Baqir (702–765) Muhammad and Ali's great great grand son, jurisprudence followed by Shia, he taught	Malik ibn Anas (711–795) wrote Muwatta, jurisprudence from early Medina period now mostly followed by Maliki Sunnis in North Africa, and taught	Al-Waqidi (748–822) wrote history books like Kitab al-Tarikh wa al-Maghazi, student of Malik ibn Anas	Abu Muhammad Abdullah ibn Abdul Hakam (died 829) wrote biographies and history books, student of Malik ibn Anas
Abu Yusuf (729–798) wrote Usul al-fiqh	Muhammad al-Shaybani (749–805)	al-Shafi‘i (767–820) wrote Al-Risala, jurisprudence followed by Shafi'i Sunnis and Sufis, and taught	Ismail ibn Ibrahim	Ali ibn al-Madini (778–849) wrote The Book of Knowledge of the Companions	Ibn Hisham (died 833) wrote early history and As-Sirah an-Nabawiyyah, Muhammad's biography
Isma'il ibn Ja'far (719–775)	Musa al-Kadhim (745–799)	Ahmad ibn Hanbal (780–855) wrote Musnad Ahmad ibn Hanbal jurisprudence followed by Hanbali Sunnis and Sufis	Muhammad al-Bukhari (810–870) wrote Sahih al-Bukhari hadith books	Muslim ibn al-Hajjaj (815–875) wrote Sahih Muslim hadith books	Dawud al-Zahiri (815–883/4) founded the Zahiri school	Muhammad ibn Isa at-Tirmidhi (824–892) wrote Jami` at-Tirmidhi hadith books	Al-Baladhuri (died 892) wrote early history Futuh al-Buldan, Genealogies of the Nobles
Ibn Majah (824–887) wrote Sunan ibn Majah hadith book	Abu Dawood (817–889) wrote Sunan Abu Dawood Hadith Book
Muhammad ibn Ya'qub al-Kulayni (864- 941) wrote Kitab al-Kafi hadith book followed by Twelver Shia	Muhammad ibn Jarir al-Tabari (838–923) wrote History of the Prophets and Kings, Tafsir al-Tabari	Abu al-Hasan al-Ash'ari (874–936) wrote Maqālāt al-islāmīyīn, Kitāb al-luma, Kitāb al-ibāna 'an usūl al-diyāna
Ibn Babawayh (923–991) wrote Man La Yahduruhu al-Faqih jurisprudence followed by Twelver Shia	Sharif Razi (930–977) wrote Nahj al-Balagha followed by Twelver Shia	Nasir al-Din al-Tusi (1201–1274) wrote jurisprudence books followed by Ismaili and Twelver Shia	Al-Ghazali (1058–1111) wrote The Niche for Lights, The Incoherence of the Philosophers, The Alchemy of Happiness on Sufism	Rumi (1207–1273) wrote Masnavi, Diwan-e Shams-e Tabrizi on Sufism
Key: Some of Muhammad's Companions	Key: Taught in Medina	Key: Taught in Iraq	Key: Worked in Syria	Key: Travelled extensively collecting the sayings of Muhammad and compiled books of hadith	Key: Worked in Persia

== See also ==
- Raja ibn Haywa
- Abu Bakr ibn Muhammad ibn Hazm
