= Al-Mubarak =

Al-Mubarak (Arabic: المبارك) is an Arabic family name/patronymic, meaning son of Mubarak/descent of Mubarak. It may refer to:

Surname

- Khaldoon Al Mubarak, Manchester City chairman

Patronymic

- Jaber Al-Mubarak Al-Hamad Al-Sabah (born 1948), government minister of Kuwait, son of Mubarak bin Hamad Al-Sabah
- Salim Al-Mubarak Al-Sabah (1864–1921), ninth sheikh of Kuwait of the line of Al-Sabah, son of Mubarak Al-Sabah

== See also ==
- Hosni Mubarak
- Ibn Mubarak
- Ibn al-Mubarak
- Mubarak Muyika
