= Abu Ma'shar =

Abu Ma'shar is an Arabic name which might refer to any one of the following people:

- Abu Ma'shar al-Balkhi (787–886), Muslim astrologer of the 9th Century AD
- Abu Ma'shar Najih al-Sindi al-Madani (709–787), Muslim historian of the 8th Century AD
