= Ata ibn Abi Rabah =

Muslim jurist and hadith transmitter (c.646-c.733 CE)

- عطاء بن أبي رباح

Mufti of Mecca
- Succeeded by: Ibn Jurayj

Personal life
- Born: c. 25 AH/646 CE, Muwalladi l-Janad, Yemen, Rashidun Caliphate
- Died: c. 115 AH/733 CE Mecca, Umayyad Caliphate
- Children: Yaqub ibn Ata ibn Abi Rabah
- Known for: Islamic jurisprudence, hadith transmission, tafsir

Religious life
- Religion: Islam

Muslim leader
- Students: Abu Hanifa Ibn Jurayj, Qays ibn Sa'd, Ibn Abi Layla, Abd al-Rahman al-Awza'i
- Influenced by: Ibn Abbas

Ata ibn Abi Rabah (Arabic: عطاء بن أبي رباح, romanized: ʿAṭāʾ ibn Abī Rabāḥ; c. 646 – c. 733) was a prominent early Muslim jurist and hadith transmitter of Nubian origin who served as the mufti of Mecca in the late seventh and early eighth centuries. He is considered a leading figure of the early Meccan school of fiqh.

== Early life ==
Ata was born in the town of Muwalladi l-Janad in Yemen. Although early biographical sources differ on the exact year of his birth, it is generally accepted he was born towards the beginning of Uthman ibn Affan's reign, c. 25 AH/646 CE. His mother was a Nubian basket weaver while his father, named Aslam, is described as being dark-skinned and flat-nosed. Ata was a cripple and possessed a limp, and while he was born with one healthy eye, he later went completely blind.

== Life as a scholar ==
Ata was raised in Mecca as a mawla (client) of the Qurayshi Abu Khuthaym al-Fihri, where he worked as a Quran teacher, before being recognised for his expertise in fiqh. He was later appointed mufti of the city by the Umayyads and taught in the Great Mosque, in which he also lived during the latter years of his life. While in Mecca, Ata met with and transmitted hadith from several companions of Muhammad, including Ibn Abbas, Abu Hurairah and Jabir ibn Abd Allah.

As a jurist, Ata was considered an authority on the rites of Hajj. Among his most prominent students were Qays ibn Sa'd and Ibn Jurayj, the latter being the primary transmitter of his legal opinions. When giving legal verdicts, Ata largely relied on his own independent reasoning (ra'y). Less frequently, he referred to the opinions of Muhammad's companions and Qur'anic verses, and he rarely referred to hadith.

An early Quranic exegete, the commentaries of Ata are preserved in the tafsir works of Ibn Mujahid, Abd al-Razzaq al-San'ani and al-Tabari. Ata's style of commentary has been described as simple and concise, eschewing linguistic analysis for explaining the meanings of Quranic verses.

Ata fought for Abd Allah ibn al-Zubayr during the Second Fitna and lost a hand in battle. In 93 AH/711 CE, he was imprisoned on suspicion of being a murji' at the behest of Al-Hajjaj ibn Yusuf, but was later released. Biographical sources disagree on the year of his death, but it is likely he died c. 115 AH/733 CE. He was survived by one son named Yaqub.

== Legacy ==
=== Piety ===
Narrations in biographical works present Ata as a pious and virtuous man. He reportedly only wore simple clothing, performed the Hajj over seventy times, and, despite reaching an advanced age, was able to recite 200 verses of Al-Baqarah in salah without moving.

=== Hadith ===
Many of the hadith transmitted by Ata lack an isnad. Early hadith scholars, such as Yahya ibn Sa'id al-Qattan, were critical of hadith that Ata had transmitted in mursal form, suspected he may have engaged in tadlis and noted that his intellectual faculties declined towards the end of his life. However, he was generally perceived as a reliable transmitter and later hadith critics such as Ahmad ibn Hanbal exonerated him from tadlis. Several of Ata's students, including his son Yaqub and Ibn Jurayj, transmitted hadith from him in writing.

==== Musannaf of Abd al-Razzaq ====
Ata is frequently cited as one of Ibn Jurayj's authorities in the Musannaf of Abd al-Razzaq. In a sample of 3,810 narrations selected by Harald Motzki, 39% of those ascribed to Ibn Jurayj are adduced from Ata. Ata relates a tradition in only 20% of these narrations, with the remaining 80% being his own ra'y. Of the authorities cited in his traditions, 15% are companions of Muhammad, 10% are Quranic verses and 5% are hadith from Muhammad. According to Motzki, Ibn Jurayj attempted to reproduce Ata's narrations faithfully and the corpus lacked signs of fabrication.
