= Awza'i school =

Legal school in Sunni Islam

The Awza'i school (Arabic: الأوزاعي, romanized: al-Awzā‘ī) was one of the schools of Fiqh, the Islamic jurisprudence, or religious law within Sunni Islam in the 8th century. Its Imam was Abd al-Rahman al-Awza'i.

== History ==
=== In the Maghreb and al-Andalus ===
Since the Umayyad conquest and the Berber revolt, Morocco and western Algeria followed the Kharijite schools adopted by the ruling dynasties such as the Maghrawa, the emirate of Toudgha and the Ibadi Rustamid dynasty. And, with the exception of Tunisia and al-Andalus, the Maliki school only became established in the region after the rise of the Almoravid dynasty.

Then during the rule of al-Hakam I, the official fatwas were changed and given according to the opinion of Malik ibn Anas and the people of al-Madina. This was due to the opinion and preference of al-Hakam due to some political benefits he saw and they differ about the actual reason, which still remains unclear. Most hold that it was due to the scholars of al-Andalus travelling to Medina, then when they returned they spoke of the excellence of Malik, his wide knowledge and great station, so they honoured him and preferred his madhhab. Others say that Imam Malik asked some of the people of al-Andalus about the rule in their region and they described it to him and Malik was very pleased by it since the Abbasids in that time did not rule in a manner that was agreeable. So, Imam Malik said to the person who told him, ‘We ask Allah to enlighten our sacred precincts with your rule.’ This was transmitted to the ruler of al-Andalus, who already knew of the knowledge, excellence and piety of Malik; so he led the people to accept his madhhab and ordered that the madhhab of al-Awza’i be abandoned. Later, the kings of Morocco and the west agreed that the rulings and actions should be according to the preferences of Ibn al-Qaasim al-`Utaqi (a famous student of Malik) only.

== Disappearance ==
The Awza'i school remained the main school of thought in Syria until the tenth century, when a Shafi'i scholar was appointed judge of Damascus. The judge, Abu Zar'ah Muhammad ibn Uthmaan, began a practice where one hundred dinars would be given to anyone who memorized Mukhtasr al-Muzani, a basic book of Shafi'i Fiqh. This practice caused the Shafi'i school to spread rapidly in Syria and led to a decline in Awza'i followers, until none were found in the 11th century. Despite the extinction of his school, al-Awza'i's contributions to Fiqh are still recorded in most comparative Fiqh books.
