= Abu Ma'shar al-Sindi =

8th-century Sindhi Muslim scholar of hadith

Imam Abū Ma'shar al-Sindī

Personal life
- Born: 'Abd al-Raḥmān bin al-Walīd bin Hilāl al-Sindī c. 90 AH / 709 CE Yemen, Umayyad Caliphate
- Died: Ramadan 170 AH / February–March 787 CE Baghdad, Iraq, Abbasid Caliphate
- Children: Muhammad
- Era: Late Umayyad and early Abbasid era
- Main interest(s): Hadith, Sīrah, History. Jurisprudence

Religious life
- Religion: Islam
- Profession: Tailor

Muslim leader
- Teacher: Said ibn al-Musayyib, Abū Umāma As'ad bin Ḥanīf, Abu Barda bin Abi Musa al-Asha'ari, Hisham ibn Urwah, Sa'id Al-Maqbari, Muhammad bin Ka'b al-Qarzi, Musa bin Yasar al-Urdani
- Students: Sufyan al-Thawri, Al-Layth ibn Sa'd, Al-Waqidi, Waki' ibn al-Jarrah
- Arabic name
- Personal (Ism): Najīḥ نجيح
- Patronymic (Nasab): bin ʿAbd al-Raḥmān بن عبد الرحمٰن
- Teknonymic (Kunya): Abū Maʿshar أبو معشر
- Toponymic (Nisba): al-Sindī al-Madanī السندي المدني

Abu Ma'shar Najīḥ bin 'Abd al-Raḥmān al-Sindī al-Madanī (Arabic: أبو معشر نجيح بن عبد الرحمن السندي المدني) commonly known as Abu Ma'shar al-Sindī was a Muslim historian and hadith scholar. A contemporary of Ibn Ishaq, he wrote the Kitāb al-Maghāzī, fragments of which are preserved in the works of al-Waqidi and Ibn Sa'd. Al-Tabari quoted him for Biblical information and chronological statements about the Islamic prophet Muhammad and later Muslim conquests. As a hadith transmitter, Muslim experts in biographical evaluation (ʿIlm al-rijāl) generally considered him unreliable.

== Biography ==
=== Early life and background ===
According to one of his grandsons, Abu Ma'shar was originally from Yemen and was taken prisoner as a child during a raid by Yazid ibn al-Muhallab on either Al-Yamama or Al-Bahrain in approximately 97 AH / 715-6 CE. His original name was 'Abd al-Raḥmān bin al-Walīd bin Hilāl al-Sindī, and he initially became a client (mawlā) of the Banu Hanzala, a branch of the Tamim tribe. He was later purchased in Medina by a member of the Banū Asad, who gave him the name Najīḥ ('the one giving good counsel'). However, according to alternative version by Ibn Sa'd, Abu Ma'shar was a mukātab (a slave under a manumission contract) of Banū Makhzūm, from whom he gave regular payments to purchase his freedom.

While still enslaved, Abu Ma'shar was bought by Umm Musa al-Hashimiyya, the wife of the Abbasid caliph Al-Mansur, who later manumitted him. Thus he became a client of the Banū Hāshim. He reportedly preferred his clientage to his previous one with the Banū Ḥanẓala.

His nisba al-Sindī ('the one from Sind') indicates that his family was originally from Sindh (Modern-day Pakistan) before settling to the Gulf region. According to Josef Horovitz, Abu Ma'shar’s father might have migrated from Sind to Yemen. His nisba al-Madanī was a result of the fact that he lived for a long time in Medina. He is said to have been a student of Abū Umāma As'ad bin Sahl bin Ḥanīf (d. 100 AH/718–719 CE), who is regarded as a Companion by most scholars, thus Abu Ma'shar is regarded as a Tabi'un.

=== Later life ===
During his time in Medina he heard and memorised maghāzī traditions that were recited and discussed at his master's house. He initially was set to work as an apprentice tailor, where several prominent tābi'īn used to visit him, including Muḥammad bin Ka'b al-Quraẓī, Muḥammad bin Qays and Sa'īd al-Maqburī. He is said to have learnt the ḥadīths and reports recounted by them. His student Abu Nu'aym (d. 219/834–5) described him, as intelligent and as one having a good memory, although speaking Arabic incorrectly, for instance, mispronouncing the letter kāf as qāf.

When the Abbasid caliph al-Mahdī visited Medina in the second year of his caliphate (160 AH / 776–7 CE), he gave Abu Ma'shar one thousand gold dinars and invited him to Baghdad to teach the people Fiqh (Islamic jurisprudence). Abu Ma'shar accepted the offer and moved to Baghdad the following year in 161 AH/777–8 CE, and lived there for the rest of his life.

=== Death ===
Abū Maʿshar died in Baghdad in Ramadan 170 AH / February–March 787 CE. According to some accounts, he suffered from mental breakdown and severe infirmities before his death. The Abbasid caliph Hārūn al-Rashīd (r. 786–809) prayed led his funeral prayers. He was buried at the "Great Cemetery" in western Baghdad.

== Works ==
Several scholars are listed as his major authorities, including Muḥammad bin Ka'b al-Quraẓī (d. 117–20/735–8), Nafi Mawla Ibn Umar (d. 117–20/735–8); and Hisham ibn Urwah (d. 146/763–4). Among Abu Ma'shar’s most important students were his son Muḥammad, his Kitāb al-maghāzī and his complete Ta'rīkh, Al-Waqidi, who met Abu Ma'shar to discuss a tradition about a particular raid, Isḥāq bin 'Īsā al-Ṭabbā' (d. 215/830–1) who, transmitted his Ta'rīkh al-khulafā'

- Maghazi

Abū Ma'shar authored one of the earliest known works on Maghāzī. According to his son Muḥammad, he received these traditions from Muḥammad bin Qays al-Qāṣṣ (d. c. 125/743), Sa'īd bin Abī Sa'īd al-Maqbarī (d. 123/741–2), Shuraḥbīl bin Sa'd (d. 123/741–2), among other Medinan scholars.

His Maghāzī was primarily transmitted through his son Muḥammad and his student Muḥammad ibn Bahrām al-Marwazī (d. 213–215 AH / 828–830 CE). According to Josef Horovitz, it also covered the entire life of the Prophet. The Maghazi doesn't survives and is only preserved in later citations. The majority of references to the Maghāzī appear in the works of Al-Waqidi, and is also cited by Al-Baladhuri on several occasions. Additionally, Al-Ma'arri referred to and used a minor portion of the work known as al-Mab'ath.

His Maghāzī didn't enjoyed a wide audience due to being overshadowed by Sirah of Ibn Ishaq and skepticism of rijāl scholars regarding Abū Ma'shar’s reliability as a ḥadīth transmitter. Nevertheless, scholars like Ahmad ibn Hanbal praised his knowledge of maghāzī traditions.

- al-Ta'rīkh and Ta'rīkh al-khulafā'.

Amonga all the works attributed to Abū Ma'shar, he is best known for his historical writings, especially al-Taʾrīkh and Taʾrīkh al-Khulafāʾ. These works reportedly include detailed chronologies of political events, caliphal reigns, and the annual leadership of the ḥajj. However, neither text has survived in complete form.

Fragments of both works are preserved through later historians and compilers, including al-Azdī’s, Al-Waqidi, Ibn Sa'd, Al-Farisi, Al-Baladhuri, Al-Yaqubi, Al-Tabari, and Ibn Asakir, for instance, records two traditions and several chronological notes concerning the conquest of Syria. Al-Fasawī cites several traditions from Abū Ma'shar, including five reports dealing with the dates of caliphal accessions and the appointment of ḥajj leaders.

Al-Ṭabarī quotes over one hundred fragments from Abū Ma'shar, many of them concerning caliphs and ḥajj commanders. At the beginning of his Ta'rīkh, al-Ṭabarī also preserves traditions attributed to Abū Ma'shar concerning the creation and the story of Adam and Eve. The largest known collection of Abū Ma'shar’s fragments, approximately two hundred, is found in Ibn Asākir's Ta'rīkh Dimashq, which draws on more than thirty-five distinct lines of transmission. These fragments focus mainly on dating historical events and the succession of caliphs or pilgrimage leaders.

The final entry preserved from Abū Ma'shar’s Ta'rīkh al-Khulafā' concerns the death of the Abbasid caliph al-Hādī on 14 September 786, just months before Abū Ma'shar’s own death.

Abū Maʿshar also authored a separate work on the Event of al-Ḥarra, which was transmitted by one of his grandsons, Dāwūd ibn Muḥammad ibn Abī Ma'shar. Although the original work has not survived, fragments of it are preserved through later citations found in the writings of Abu al-Arab, Al-Bayhaqi and Ibn Qutaybah.

== Hadith ==
Many scholars of rijāl have accused him of negligence and carelessness and called his narrations ‘weak’ (ḍa'īf). Other well-known authorities on rijāl, including Yahya ibn Ma'in, did not consider him a reliable (thiqa) narrator, but his veracity (ṣadūq) was confirmed by some other authorities. Al-Ṭūsī regarded Abu Ma'shar as one of the companions Ja'far al-Sadiq, mainly because he was his contemporary.

As a muḥaddith, he was criticised by Ibn Sa'd (d. 230/845), Ibn Ḥanbal (d. 241/855), and al-Bukhārī (d. 256/870) for his loose treatment of the chains of transmitters (asānīd) and was considered a weak transmitter by Ibn Ma'īn (d. 233/847), Abu Dāwūd (d. 316/929), Ibn Hajar al-Asqalani and al-Nasā'ī (d. 303/915).
