= Iyas ibn Mu'awiya al-Muzani =

8th-century Arab judge

- إياس بن معاوية المزني
- Born: Al Yamama
- Died: 122 AH
- Occupation: Judge
- Known for: Wisdom

Iyas ibn Mu'awiya al-Muzani (Arabic: إياس بن معاوية المزني) (full name, Abu Wathila Iyas ibn Mu'awiya ibn Qurra) was a tabi'i Qadi (judge) in the 2nd century AH who lived in Basra (modern day Iraq). He was renowned for possessing immense cleverness which became a favourite topic in Arabic folklore.

== Stories of Iyas al-Muzani ==
- Al-Maydani relates a story about Iyas Al-Muzani, that he once heard a dog bark and declared that the beast was tied to the brink of a well; he judged so because the bark was followed by an echo, caused by the sound being reflected from the bottom of well
- Once, two men came before Al-Muzani, the complainant claiming repayment of the money received by the defendant, who denied the debt. Al-Muzani asked the plaintiff where he had lent the money, and he answered that it was done under a certain tree. Al-Muzani told him to go there by way of refreshing his memory, and, sometime after his departure, asked the defendant if his adversary could have reached it. "Not yet," said the man, forgetting himself; "it's a long way off," - thus proving the allegation against him to be true.

== His Death ==
He died in 122 AH at 76 years old

He said in the year in which he died: I saw in a dream as if my father and I were on two horses and they ran together, but I did not outpace him and he did not outpace me. My father lived seventy-six years and I did. When he reached his last night, he said, “Do you know what night this is in which I completed my father's lifespan and he slept and became dead?
