= Amr ibn Dinar =

Muslim scholar and jurist (c.666–744 CE)

- عمرو بن دينار

Mufti of Mecca
- Preceded by: Ata ibn Abi Rabah
- Succeeded by: Ibn Abi Najih

Personal life
- Born: c. 46 AH (666/667 CE)
- Died: c. 126 AH (743/744 CE)
- Known for: Hadith transmission, Islamic jurisprudence

Religious life
- Religion: Islam

Muslim leader
- Students: Sufyan ibn Uyaynah, Abu Hanifa
- Influenced by: Tawus ibn Kaysan, Ata ibn Abi Rabah, Ikrima ibn Amr

Amr ibn Dinar (Arabic: عمرو بن دينار, romanized: ʿAmr ibn Dīnār, c. 46-126 AH/666-744 CE) was a seventh-century Muslim jurist and hadith transmitter from the tabi'un who served as the mufti of Mecca.

== Biography ==
Amr ibn Dinar's exact date of birth is unknown, but Islamic biographical dictionaries estimate it to be around c. 46 AH (666/667 CE). He was a mawla of either Banu Maddhij or the Banu Jumah. In his early years, he attended the study circles of Ibn Abbas' students, possibly in Mecca and Ta'if. He later studied under Ata ibn Abi Rabah and Tawus ibn Kaysan and was regarded positively, the latter encouraging his son to study under him.

He gained renown as a scholar by the beginning of the eighth century and was offered the position of mufti of Mecca by the Umayyads after the death of Ata. Although he initially refused, he accepted after being offered the post a second time following the death of Ata's successor, Qays ibn Sa'd. Amr's most prominent student was Sufyan ibn ʽUyaynah, through whom much of his biographical information is transmitted.

Biographical works suggest he possessed an odd personality: he seemingly arbitrarily refused to answer questioners, required his students to carry him in and out of mosques and expressed his displeasure by weeping and pretending to be blind. He was opposed to his students recording his opinions on the grounds that they were subject to change. He also disapproved of them writing down hadith narrated through him, although several, including Ibn Uyaynah, transmitted hadith from him in written form regardless.

Amr died around c. 126 AH (743/744 CE) and was succeeded as mufti by his peer Ibn Abi Najih.
