= Shu'ba ibn al-Hajjaj =

8th-century Islamic scholar

Shuʿba bin al-Ḥajjāj
- Title: King of Hadith

Personal life
- Born: 85 AH Wāsiṭ
- Died: 160 AH Baṣra
- Main interest: Hadith studies

Religious life
- Religion: Islam

Muslim leader
- Influenced by: Ja'far al-Sadiq

Shuʿba bin al-Ḥajjāj bin al-Ward, Abū Busṭām al-ʿAtakī (Arabic: شُعْبَة بِن الحَجَّاْج بِن الْوَرْد أَبُو بُسطام الْعَتَكِي) (c. 85–160/704–776 AH/CE) was an early, devout Muslim, who was known for both his knowledge of poetry and of ḥadīth. His scrupulousness in ḥadīth transmission, alongside other scholars such as Sufyān al-Thawrī, is understood to have laid the foundation for the concretization of ḥadīth sciences.

== Biography ==
Shuʿba bin al-Ḥajjāj was born with a speech impediment (althagh) sometime between the years 80–86 AH, though likely 85, in Wāsiṭ, a historical city located on the west bank of the Tigris River in central ʿIrāq. He then moved to Baṣra as a child, where lived, studied, and later died in 160/776 AH/CE due to plague. Another famous scholar and ḥadīth transmitter, Sufyān al-Thawrī, called Shuʿba "commander of the faithful concerning ḥadīth" (amīr al-mu'minīn fī al-ḥadīth), but Shuʿba himself is quoted by Ibn Qutayba al-Dīnawarī as saying "By God, truly in poetry I am more sound than in ḥadīth."

He was instrumental in transmitting ḥadīth, and is understood to be one of the first individuals mentioned as a zāhid amongst the early ḥadīth transmitters. Although Abū Ḥanīfa and ʿAbd Allāh bin Ṣāliḥ al-ʿAjlī al-Kūfī levelled critiques against his transmissions.

It is mentioned in al-Dhahabi's Tārīkh al-Islām that Shuʿba studied masāʿil (juridical affairs) under both Anas Ibn Mālik and Ḥasan al-Baṣrī, but not much is known of his juridical endeavors. However, his appearance in the ḥadīth transmitted by individuals such as Sufyan al-Thawri, Muslim ibn al-Hajjaj and al-Bukhari show the prominent place he held in the early circles of ḥadīth transmitters and other scholars. Furthermore, there are many reports that mention the devotion of Shuʿba, including: helping the poor, avoiding ostentatious displays of knowledge and wealth, and participating in renunciatory acts.
