= Musannaf =

Genre of Hadith literature

Musannaf (Arabic: مُصَنَّف) are hadīth collections defined by their arrangement of content according to topic and constitute a major category within the class of all such works. Etymologically, musannaf is the passive particle of the Arabic verb sannafa (صَنَّفَ), meaning to arrange by chapter, and so has the literal meaning of something that is sectionally arranged. Though the designation can thus apply to any text so ordered, and indeed has been used with respect to such distinct genres as fiqh (i.e. Islamic jurisprudence), in practice it is most typically applied to compilations of ahadīth.

Numerous hadīth collections are of the musannaf variety, including the Six Books (i.e. the six canonical collections of hadith in Sunni Islam). A less typical format is the musnad compilation, where content is arranged according to the original transmitter of the report, typically a companion of Muhammad.

== List of musannaf ==
- Muwatta Imam Malik
- Musannaf Abd al-Razzaq
- Musannaf Ibn Abi Shaybah
