= Tawus ibn Kaysan =

Tabi'in hadith narrator (died 723)

- طاووس بن كيسان
- Title: al-Ḥāfiẓ; al-Muḥaddith; al-Faqīh; al-Yemeni al-Jundi

Personal life
- Born: 12 AH ≈ 634 CE Yemen, Rashidun Caliphate
- Died: 8th-13th Dhu al-Hijjah 106 AH ≈ 724 CE (aged 94)
- Resting place: Muzdalifah, Hejaz
- Children: Abd Allah ibn Tawus Abd ar-Rahman
- Parent: Kaysan ibn Ibrahim (father)
- Other names: Abu Abd ar-Rahman al-Farsi; Tawus al-Hamiri

Religious life
- Religion: Islam

Tawus Ibn Kaysan (Arabic: طاووس بن كيسان; died 723) was an early Muslim Tabi', narrator of hadith, and scholar of fiqh.

He is also known as Tawoos ibn Kaysaan, "Tawoos" or "al-Taus,".

== Biography ==
Of Persian of origin, his real name is said to have been "Dhakwan", with "Kaysan" being a nickname. He was one of the scholars of the Tabi‘in and a companion of Ali Zayn al-Abidin and student of Ibn Abbas, being a major figure in his school of jurisprudence. Ibn Hajar al-Asqalani related that Tawus inhabited an area called "al-Jund". Ibn Hayyan said about him: "He was among the worshipers of the people of the Yemen and the masters of the leading members of the next generation.” He performed the hajj forty times and narrated some of the whispered prayers of Imam Zayn al-Abidin. According to Ibn Kathir, he met over 50 companions. Tawus was also the main teacher of Umar ibn Abdul Aziz.

Ibn Abbas is stated to have said: "I believe that Tawus is from the people of Paradise".

== Hadith ==
Hadith from him are recorded by Muhammad al-Bukhari, Muslim ibn al-Hajjaj, al-Tirmidhi, al-Nasa'i, Abu Dawood, Ibn Majah, Ahmad ibn Hanbal and Ibn Hibban.
