= Ali ibn al-Madini =

Sunni Islamic scholar (778–849)

Personal life
- Born: 161 AH
- Died: 234 AH
- Era: Islamic golden age
- Region: Iraq
- Main interest: Hadith

Religious life
- Religion: Islam
- Creed: Athari

Muslim leader
- Influenced by: Imam Abu Hanifa, Abu Yusuf, Ahmad Ibn Hanbal
- Influenced: Ibrahim ibn Ya'qub al-Juzajani

Abū al-Ḥasan ʻAlī ibn ʻAbdillāh ibn Jaʻfar al-Madīnī (778 CE/161 AH – 849/234) (Arabic: أبو الحسن علي بن عبد الله بن جعفر المديني) was a ninth-century Sunni Islamic scholar who was influential in the science of hadith. Alongside Ahmad ibn Hanbal, Ibn Abi Shaybah and Yahya ibn Ma'in, Ibn al-Madini has been considered by many Muslim specialists in hadith to be one of the four most significant authors in the field.

== Biography ==
Ibn al-Madīnī was born in the year 778 CE/161 AH in Basra, Iraq to a family with roots in Medina now in Saudi Arabia. His teachers include his father, ʻAbdullāh ibn Jaʻfar, Ḥammād ibn Yazīd, Hushaym and Sufyān ibn ʻUyaynah and other from their era. His teacher, Ibn ʻUyaynah, said that he had learned more from Ibn al-Madīnī, his student, than his student from him.

Ibn al-Madīnī specialized in the disciplines of hadith, biographical evaluation and al-ʻIlal, hidden defects, in the sanad, chain of narration. He was praised by other hadith specialists for his prowess in that field—by both his contemporaries, students and his teachers. ʻAbd al-Raḥmān ibn Mahdī, a scholar who preceded him, described Ibn al-Madīnī the most knowledgeable person of prophetic hadith.

His students include prominent hadith scholars in their own right. They include: Muḥammad ibn Yaḥyā al-Dhuhalī, Muḥammad ibn Ismāʻīl al-Bukhārī, Abū Dāwūd Sulaymān ibn al-Ashʻath al-Sijistānī and others. Al-Bukhārī, who went on the collect what is considered to be the most authentic collection of hadith in Sunni Islam, said that he did not consider himself diminutive in comparison to anyone other than Ibn al-Madīnī.

Al-Dhahabī lauded Ibn al-Madīnī as an imām and as exemplary to subsequent scholars in the field in hadith, a description he considered tarnished by Ibn al-Madīnī's adopted position in the theological inquisition of the ninth century. According to Al-Dhahabī, he adopted a position in favor of the Muʻtazilah, who regard the Quran as created by God, but later regretted this and declared the claimant that the Quran was created as an apostate.

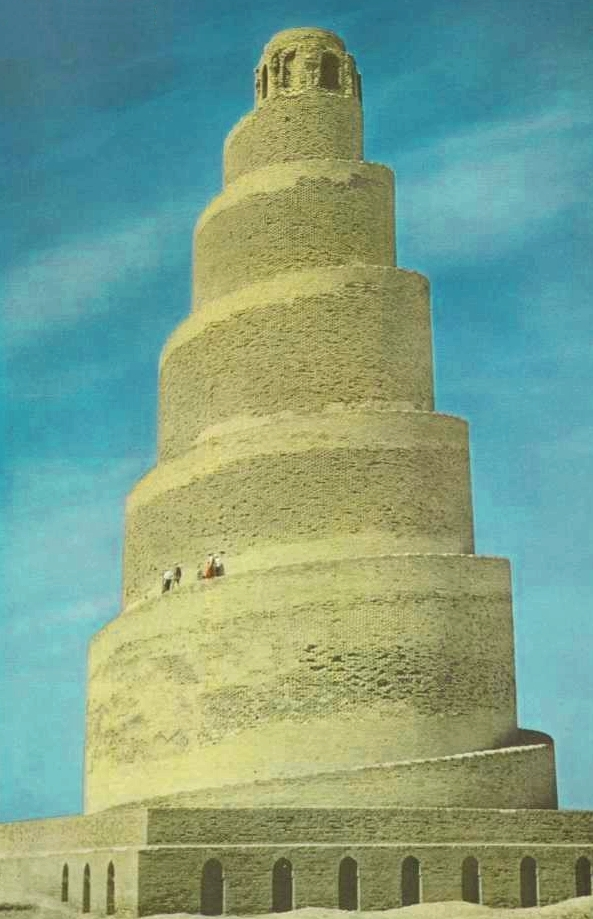
Minaret at the Great Mosque of Samarra, the city in Iraq where Ibn al-Madīnī died.

Ibn al-Madīnī died in Samarra, Iraq in June, 849/Dhu al-Qa'dah, 234.

== Works ==
Al-Nawawī said Ibn al-Madīnī authored approximately 200 works some on subjects not previously written about and many not since superseded.

- al-ʻIlal – on the subject of hidden defects (`ilal) in the sanads of hadith; of which a small segment has been published
- Kitāb al-Ḍuʻafāʼ – on the subject of weak hadith narrators in the discipline of biographical evaluation
- al-Mudallisūn – on the subject of hadith narrators who utilize ambiguous terminology in narrating
- al-Asmāʼ wa al-Kunā – on names paidonymics
- al-Musnad – a collection of hadith arranged by narrator
- Kitab Ma'rifat al-Sahaba – The Book of Knowledge of the Companions

== Early Islam scholars ==
Early Islamic scholars

Muhammad, The final Messenger of God (570–632) the Constitution of Medina, taught the Quran, and advised his companions
Abdullah ibn Masud (died 653) taught	Ali (607–661) fourth caliph taught	Aisha, Muhammad's wife and Abu Bakr's daughter taught	Abd Allah ibn Abbas (618–687) taught	Zayd ibn Thabit (610–660) taught	Umar (579–644) second caliph taught	Abu Hurairah (603–681) taught
Alqama ibn Qays (died 681) taught	Husayn ibn Ali (626–680) taught	Qasim ibn Muhammad ibn Abi Bakr (657–725) taught and raised by Aisha	Urwah ibn Zubayr (died 713) taught by Aisha, he then taught	Said ibn al-Musayyib (637–715) taught	Abdullah ibn Umar (614–693) taught	Abd Allah ibn al-Zubayr (624–692) taught by Aisha, he then taught
Ibrahim al-Nakha’i taught	Ali ibn Husayn Zayn al-Abidin (659–712) taught	Hisham ibn Urwah (667–772) taught	Ibn Shihab al-Zuhri (died 741) taught	Salim ibn Abd-Allah ibn Umar taught	Umar ibn Abdul Aziz (682–720) raised and taught by Abdullah ibn Umar
Hammad ibn Abi Sulayman taught	Muhammad al-Baqir (676–733) taught	Farwah bint al-Qasim Jafar's mother
Abu Hanifa (699–767) wrote Al Fiqh Al Akbar and Kitab Al-Athar, jurisprudence followed by Sunni, Sunni Sufi, Barelvi, Deobandi, Zaidiyyah and originally by the Fatimid and taught	Zayd ibn Ali (695–740)	Ja'far bin Muhammad Al-Baqir (702–765) Muhammad and Ali's great great grand son, jurisprudence followed by Shia, he taught	Malik ibn Anas (711–795) wrote Muwatta, jurisprudence from early Medina period now mostly followed by Maliki Sunnis in North Africa, and taught	Al-Waqidi (748–822) wrote history books like Kitab al-Tarikh wa al-Maghazi, student of Malik ibn Anas	Abu Muhammad Abdullah ibn Abdul Hakam (died 829) wrote biographies and history books, student of Malik ibn Anas
Abu Yusuf (729–798) wrote Usul al-fiqh	Muhammad al-Shaybani (749–805)	al-Shafi‘i (767–820) wrote Al-Risala, jurisprudence followed by Shafi'i Sunnis and Sufis, and taught	Ismail ibn Ibrahim	Ali ibn al-Madini (778–849) wrote The Book of Knowledge of the Companions	Ibn Hisham (died 833) wrote early history and As-Sirah an-Nabawiyyah, Muhammad's biography
Isma'il ibn Ja'far (719–775)	Musa al-Kadhim (745–799)	Ahmad ibn Hanbal (780–855) wrote Musnad Ahmad ibn Hanbal jurisprudence followed by Hanbali Sunnis and Sufis	Muhammad al-Bukhari (810–870) wrote Sahih al-Bukhari hadith books	Muslim ibn al-Hajjaj (815–875) wrote Sahih Muslim hadith books	Dawud al-Zahiri (815–883/4) founded the Zahiri school	Muhammad ibn Isa at-Tirmidhi (824–892) wrote Jami` at-Tirmidhi hadith books	Al-Baladhuri (died 892) wrote early history Futuh al-Buldan, Genealogies of the Nobles
Ibn Majah (824–887) wrote Sunan ibn Majah hadith book	Abu Dawood (817–889) wrote Sunan Abu Dawood Hadith Book
Muhammad ibn Ya'qub al-Kulayni (864- 941) wrote Kitab al-Kafi hadith book followed by Twelver Shia	Muhammad ibn Jarir al-Tabari (838–923) wrote History of the Prophets and Kings, Tafsir al-Tabari	Abu al-Hasan al-Ash'ari (874–936) wrote Maqālāt al-islāmīyīn, Kitāb al-luma, Kitāb al-ibāna 'an usūl al-diyāna
Ibn Babawayh (923–991) wrote Man La Yahduruhu al-Faqih jurisprudence followed by Twelver Shia	Sharif Razi (930–977) wrote Nahj al-Balagha followed by Twelver Shia	Nasir al-Din al-Tusi (1201–1274) wrote jurisprudence books followed by Ismaili and Twelver Shia	Al-Ghazali (1058–1111) wrote The Niche for Lights, The Incoherence of the Philosophers, The Alchemy of Happiness on Sufism	Rumi (1207–1273) wrote Masnavi, Diwan-e Shams-e Tabrizi on Sufism
Key: Some of Muhammad's Companions	Key: Taught in Medina	Key: Taught in Iraq	Key: Worked in Syria	Key: Travelled extensively collecting the sayings of Muhammad and compiled books of hadith	Key: Worked in Persia
