= Ibn Mubarak =

Ibn Mubarak is a surname. Notable people with the surname include:

- Abd Allah ibn al-Mubarak (726–797), Sunni scholar and muhaddith
- Abu'l-Fazl ibn Mubarak (1551–1602), Mughal Grand Vizier and author of Akbarnama
- Muhammad ibn Mubarak ibn Hamad Al Khalifah (born 1935), Bahraini politician
