= Yahya ibn Ma'in =

Islamic scholar (774–847)

- يحيى بن معين
- Title: Malik al-Huffaz (the king of the memorizers of hadith); Shaykh al-Muhaddithin (the teacher of the hadith experts)

Personal life
- Born: 774 Baghdad, Abbasid Caliphate
- Died: 847 (aged 72–73) Baghdad, Abbasid Caliphate
- Era: Islamic Golden Age
- Region: Abbasid Caliphate
- Main interests: Hadith; Jurisprudence
- Known for: Ilm al-Rijal

Religious life
- Religion: Islam
- Jurisprudence: Hanafi
- Creed: Athari

Muslim leader
- Teacher: Abd Allah ibn al-Mubarak; Jarir ibn Abd al-Hamid; Waki' ibn al-Jarrah; Abd al-Rahman ibn Mahdi; Sufyan ibn Uyaynah; Abd al-Razzaq al-San'ani; Abu Nuʿaym al-Fadl
- Students: Ibn Sa'd; Ahmad ibn Hanbal; Al-Bukhari; Ibrahim ibn Ya'qub al-Juzajani; Muslim ibn al-Hajjaj; Dawud al-Zahiri; Abu Dawud; Abu Hatim; Abu Ya'la al-Mawsili
- Influenced by: Abu Hanifa Abdullah ibn al-Mubarak
- Influenced: Ahmad ibn Hanbal, Muhammad al-Bukhari, Dawud al-Zahiri, Ibrahim ibn Ya'qub al-Juzajani
- Arabic name
- Personal (Ism): Yaḥyā يَحْيَىٰ
- Patronymic (Nasab): Ibn Maʿīn ibn ʿAwn ibn Ziyād ibn Bisṭām ٱبْن مَعِين ٱبْن عَوْن ٱبْن زِيَاد ٱبْن بِسْطَام
- Teknonymic (Kunya): Abū Zakariyyā أَبُو زَكَرِيَّا
- Toponymic (Nisba): Al-Marrūdhī ٱلْمَرُّوذِيّ

Yahya ibn Ma'in (Arabic: يحيى بن معين, romanized: Yaḥyā ibn Maʻīn; 774-847) was a classical Islamic scholar in the field of hadith. He was a close friend of Ahmad ibn Hanbal for much of his life. Ibn Ma'in is known to have spent all of his inheritance on seeking hadith to the extent he became extremely needy.

== Biography ==
=== Professional life ===
Yahya ibn Ma'in was born in 158 (A.H.) during the caliphate of Abu Ja‘far al-Mansur to Nabataean ancestry from Al-Anbar and was raised in Baghdad. He was the oldest of a prominent group of muḥadiths (experts in ḥadīth) known as Al-Jamā'a Al-Kibār (The Great Assembly), which included Ali ibn al-Madini, Ahmad ibn Hanbal, Ishaq ibn Rahwayh, Abu Bakr ibn Abi Shaybah, and Abu Khaithama. He was a close friend of Ahmad ibn Hanbal and is often quoted regarding Ilm ar-Rijal. Alongside Ibn Hanbal, Ali ibn al-Madini, Ibn Abi Shaybah, and Baqi ibn Makhlad, Ibn Ma'in has been considered by many Muslim specialists in hadith to be one of the most significant 9th-century authors in the field.

=== Academic career ===
Yahya sought knowledge by means of various journeys which he made so rigorously that after the passing of his father, he spent all of his 1,050,000 inherited dirhams on seeking ḥadīth to the extent that nothing remained - not even enough to purchase a pair of shoes. His journey of seeking knowledge of hadith and Islamic rulings took him to Basrah, Bagdād, Harān, Dimasq, al-Rasāfah, al-Ray, Sanʿā’, Kufā, Egypt and Mecca. Despite being a master of his science, his works were not limited to mere approbations and disapprobation of narrators, or narrating of aḥādīth; rather, he progressed forward as an author writing many books, although many are no longer extant, despite his formally writing as an author from the age of twenty. Of the books available today are; Ma’rifatul al-Rijāl, Yaḥyā bin Maʿīn wa Kitābuhu ‘l-Tārīkh and a small treatise titled ‘Min Kalām Abī Zakariyyā Yaḥyā bin Maʿīn fi ‘l-Rijāl’.

His teachers included Abdullah Ibn al-Mubārak, Ismāʿīl ibn ʿIyāsh, ‘Abād ibn ‘Abād, Sufyān ibn ʿUyainah, Gundur, Abū Muʿāwiyyah, Ḥātim ibn Ismāʿīl, Ḥafṣ ibn Giyāth, Jarīr ibn ʿAbdul-Ḥamīd, ‘Abd ur-Ruzzāq Sanani, Wakī’ and many others from Irāq, Ḥijāz, Jazīrah, Shām and Miṣr.

His famous students included Aḥmad bin Ḥanbal, Muḥammad bin Sʿad, Abū Khaithamah, al-Bukhārī, Muslim, Abū Dāwūd, ʿAbbās al-Dawrī, Abū Ḥātim and many more.

Together with Ibn Saʿd and five others, he was ordered in 218/833 by al-Maʾmūn. T̲h̲reatened with death, they complied and the event was well publicised (al-Ṭabarī, volume 3, 1116). As a result, Ibn Ḥanbal stopped speaking to him subsequently. However, he reportedly repented to him personally towards the end of his life, with Ibn Hanbal forgiving him and returning to speaking terms with him. He reputedly exposed many traditions as false and is regarded as one of the most critical early experts on rid̲j̲āl. He reportedly left behind a huge library.
