= Abd al-Rahman al-Awza'i =

Muslim scholar, jurist, and theologian (707–774)

Al-Awza'i
- ٱلْأَوْزَاعِيّ
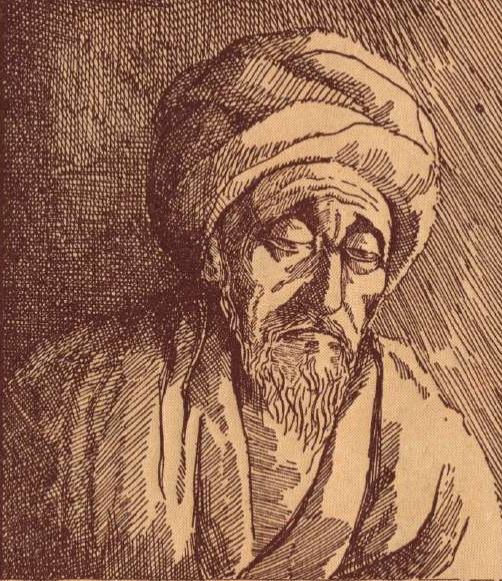
- al-Awza'i as drawn by Ridwan al-Shahhal
- Title: Imam

Personal life
- Born: 707 Baalbek, Umayyad Caliphate
- Died: 774 (aged 66–67) Beirut, Abbasid Caliphate
- Era: Islamic Golden Age
- Region: Sham
- Main interests: Jurisprudence; Creed; Hadith
- Notable idea: Awza'i school

Religious life
- Religion: Islam
- Denomination: Sunni
- Jurisprudence: Independent (eponym of the Awza'i school)
- Creed: traditionalist
- Arabic name
- Personal (Ism): ʿAbd al-Raḥmān عَبْد ٱلرَّحْمَٰن
- Patronymic (Nasab): Ibn ʿAmr ٱبْن عَمْرو
- Teknonymic (Kunya): Abū ʿAmr أَبُو عَمْرو
- Toponymic (Nisba): Al-Awzāʿī ٱلْأَوْزَاعِيّ

Abū ʿAmr ʿAbd al-Raḥmān ibn ʿAmr al-Awzāʿī (Arabic: أَبُو عَمْرو عَبْد ٱلرَّحْمَٰن بْن عَمْرو ٱلْأَوْزَاعِيّ; 707–774) was a Sunni Muslim scholar, jurist, theologian, and the chief representative and eponym of the Awza'i school of Islamic jurisprudence.

== Biography ==
Awzāʿī, of Sindhi origin, was born in Baalbek (in modern-day Lebanon) in 707. He was referred to by his nisbah Awzā (الأوزاع), part of Banu Hamdan. The biographer and historian al-Dhahabī reports on the authority of Abū Zurʿa al-Dimashqī that Awzāʿī was from al-Sind, and was a mawali of ʾAwzā tribe in his early life; Ibn ʿAsākir gives same account from Aḥmad ibn Kāmil al-Qāḍī. He may have been of Jat origin. Very little of al-Awzāʿī's writings survive, but his style of Islamic jurisprudence (usul al-fiqh) is preserved in Abu Yusuf's book Al-radd ʿala siyar al-Awzāʿī, in particular his reliance on the "living tradition," or the uninterrupted practice of Muslims handed down from preceding generations. For Awzāʿī, this was the true Sunnah of Muhammad. Awzāʿī's school flourished in Syria, the Maghreb, and al-Andalus but was eventually overcome and replaced by the Maliki school of Islamic law in the 9th century. He died in 774 and was buried near Beirut, Lebanon, where his tomb is still visited. Reflecting his standing and relations in Beirut, historical accounts note that his funeral and burial were attended by a large, mixed crowd that included local Christians.

While Imam Al-Awza'i was living in Beirut, a Christian man came to him to complain about the ruler of Balabak (Baalbek). The ruler had been treating him unjustly and burdening him with excessive land taxes (Kharaj). Hoping to secure the Imam's help, the man brought along a jar of honey as a gift.

Upon seeing the gift, Imam Al-Awza'i gave the man a clear choice:

"If you wish, I can refuse your gift and write to the ruler of Balabak ordering him to stop oppressing you. Or, if you wish, I can accept your gift [and do nothing]."

The Christian man chose to take his honey back so that the Imam could intercede for him purely on the grounds of justice. Imam Al-Awza'i then wrote a letter to the governor demanding that he stop mistreating the man and lower his taxes. When the man delivered the letter to the ruler, the governor immediately complied and reduced his tax burden by 30 silver Dirhams.

== Views ==
Theologically, al-Awza'i was known as a persecutor of the Qadariyah, but also one of the main historical witnesses of them. He had met their founder Ma'bad al-Juhani.

Al-Awza'i differed with other schools of jurisprudence in holding that apostates from Islam ought not be executed unless their apostasy is part of a plot to take over the state.

In the introduction to his work al-Jarh wa-l-Ta'dil, Ibn Abi Hatim al-Razi preserves a corpus of ten letters attributed to al-Awza'i. In these letters, al-Awza'i addresses a series of high-ranking officials in order to plead the cause of individuals and groups. Among other things, he encouraged the Abbasids to ransom Muslims who were captured by the Byzantines in Erzurum, and to increase the wages of the Syrian soldiers in charge of protecting the Levantine coast.
