= Sufyan ibn ʽUyaynah =

Meccan Islamic religious scholar (725–814)

Sufyan ibn Uyaynah
- Title: Shaykh al-Islam

Personal life
- Born: 725 CE/107 AH
- Died: 814 CE/198 AH
- Era: Islamic Golden Age (Umayyad era) (Abbasid era)
- Region: Mecca
- Main interest(s): Hadith and Tafsir and Fiqh

Religious life
- Religion: Islam

Muslim leader
- Influenced by: Amr ibn Dinar, Ibn Shihab az-Zuhri and Hisham ibn Urwah.
- Influenced: Ahmad ibn Hanbal, Yahya ibn Ma’in, Imam Al-Shafi’i, Ali ibn al-Madini and others.

Abū Muḥammad Sufyān ibn ʽUyaynah ibn Maymūn al-Hilālī al-Kūfī (Arabic: أبو محمد سفيان بن عيينة بن ميمون الهلالي الكوفي) (725 – February 25, 814) was a prominent eighth-century Islamic religious scholar from Mecca. He was from the third generation of Islam referred to as the Tabi' al-Tabi'in, "the followers of the followers". He specialized in the field of hadith and Quran exegesis and was described by al-Dhahabi as Shaykh al-Islam—a preeminent Islamic authority. Some of his students achieved much renown in their own right, establishing schools of thought that have survived until the present.

== Biography ==
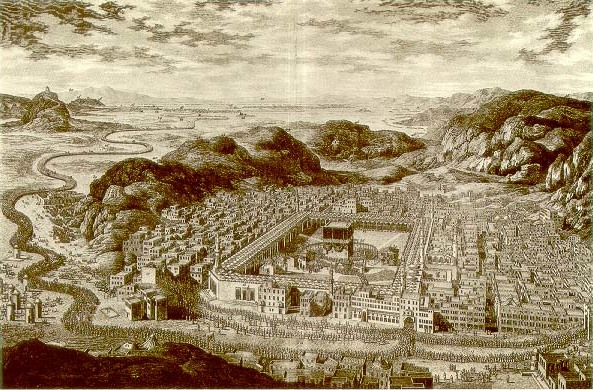
Historical picture of Mecca, the city in which Ibn ʽUyaynah was a scholar of hadith

Ibn ʽUyaynah's father, ʽUyaynah ibn Abī ʻImrān, was originally from Kufa in present day Iraq where he was a governor for Khālid ibn ʻAbdillāh al-Qasrī. However, when al-Qasrī was removed from his position his successor sought out his governors causing ʽUyaynah to flee to Mecca where he then settled.

Ibn ʽUyaynah was born in the year 725-6 CE/107 AH. He was the client (mawlā) of Muḥammad ibn Muzāḥim and began his religious studying while still young. He said of himself that he first sat formally with a religious instructor at 15 when he attended the lessons of ʻAbd al-Karīm Abū Umayyah. Subsequent teachers include ʻAmr ibn Dīnār, al-Zuhrī, Ziyād ibn ʻAllāqah, Abū Isḥāq, al-Aswad ibn Qays, Zayd ibn Aslam, ʻAbdullāh ibn Dīnār, Manṣūr ibn al-Muʻtamir, ʻAbd al-Raḥmān ibn al-Qāsim and many others.

By his own account, Ibn ʽUyaynah read the entire Qur'an (perhaps meaning that he had memorized it) by the age of four and began writing hadith at age seven. Upon turning 15, his father gave him the following advice which he later said he never turned away from:

My son, the meanderings of childhood have now departed you, associate yourself with good and you will be from its people. And, know that none will be content with the religious scholars unless obedient to them so obey them and be content, serve them and grasp some of their knowledge.

He lived in Mecca and had nine brothers. Of the brothers, five pursued studies in hadith with Sufyān becoming the most renowned of them. The names of the remaining four are Muḥammad, Ibrāhīm, Ādam and ʻImrām.

=== Scholastic career ===
Ibn ʽUyaynah was praised by contemporaries for both his knowledge and humility. ʻAbd al-Raḥmān ibn Mahdī described him as from the most knowledgeable people of the hadith of the inhabitants of the Tihamah region of what is now Saudi Arabia. He was lauded by Muḥammad Ibn Ismāʼīl al-Bukhārī for his memorizing ability, an essential quality for a hadith narrator. Not just a transmitter of recorded knowledge, his student al-Shāfiʽī said he had not seen anyone more adept at explaining the meaning of hadiths than Ibn ʽUyaynah. His humility was also illustrated by al-Shāfiʽī's mention of Ibn ʽUyaynah's reluctance to give religious verdicts. Ibn Mahdī preferred him to a contemporary of his, Sufyān al-Thawrī, in their understanding of the Qur'an and hadith.

Statements attributed to Ibn ʽUyaynah illustrate his respect for religious knowledge, acting upon that knowledge and the sacrifice necessary to obtain it. In one statement he said that whatever increase a person experiences in their intellect is matched by a decrease in material wealth. And, that knowledge that does not benefit an individual is of detriment to them.

Ibn ʽUyaynah's students were numerous. Many of them would embark on a religious pilgrimage (Hajj) to Mecca intending to meet him and then crowding him during the days of Hajj. Some of Ibn ʽUyaynah's teachers were also his students, for example, al-ʻAmash, Ibn Jurayj, and Shuʼbah. Both Abū ʽAbdullāh Muhammad ibn Idrīs al-Shāfiʽī the namesake of the Shāfiʽī school of jurisprudence and Aḥmad ibn Muḥammad ibn Ḥanbal the namesake of the Ḥanbalī school. Al-Nawawī, a prominent Shāfiʽī scholar, cited Ibn ʽUyaynah as from "the grandfathers of the Shāfiʽī scholars in their methodology in jurisprudence".

The hadith Ibn ʽUyaynah narrated are found in the six canonical hadith collections.

=== Death ===
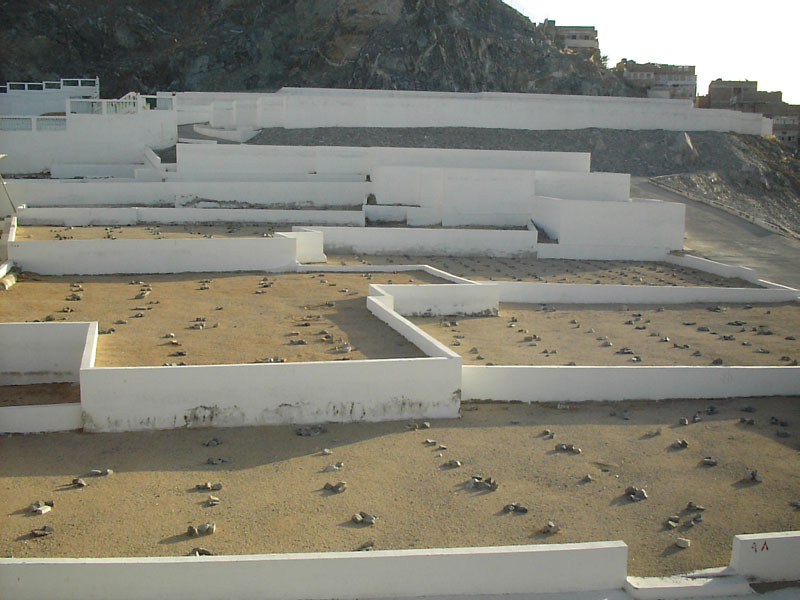
A picture of "Jannat ul Mualla Graveyard" ( also known as "Al-Hajun Graveyard" ) where Sufyan ibn ʽUyaynah was buried

Ibn ʽUyaynah performed the religious pilgrimage (Hajj) seventy times, saying that each time he went he supplicated Allah that that not be the last time he visit the places of Hajj. He said he was shy to ask this again on the seventieth occasion and returned to Mecca and died there within the next year. He died on Saturday February 25, 814 CE, the first day of Rajab, 198 AH, at the age of 91. He was buried in the al-Ḥajūn district of Mecca.

== Works ==
Ibn ʽUyaynah compiled one of the early collections of hadith with his Jāmiʻ which followed the Muwaṭṭaʼ of Mālik ibn Anas. The subject of his book was Prophetic narrations (sunan) and subsequent narrations (āthār) and another contained "some" Qur'an exegesis. Al-Ubbī, a latter religious scholar, claimed this work to be one of the first compilations in Islam.

In summary, his two known works are:

- al-Jāmiʼ
- al-Tafsīr
