= Al-Jami' al-Saghir =

Hadith collection by Jalal al-Din al-Suyuti

Al-Jami' as-Saghir
- Author: Jalāl al-Dīn al-Suyūṭī
- Original title: الجامع الصغير
- Genre: Hadith collection

Al-Jami' as-Saghir (Arabic: الجامع الصغير, lit. 'The little collection', al-Jami as-Saghir) is a Sunni hadith collection authored by the Islamic scholar Jalāl al-Dīn al-Suyūṭī (1445 – 1505 CE/ 849 - 911 H).

== Background ==
Al-Suyūṭī began compiling seventy-one hadith collections into one grand work titled Jamʿ al-Jawāmi, but he did not live long enough to complete it. Al-Jāmiʿ al-Ṣaghīr is, in a sense, an abridgment of this unfinished monumental work. The author completed it on 28 Rabīʿ al-Awwal 907 (October 11, 1501), and named it al-Jāmiʿ al-Ṣaghīr min ḥadīth al-bashīr al-nadhīr. The work is arranged alphabetically, with hadiths generally ordered according to the first two letters of the opening word, and—by the nature of the method followed—chains of transmission (isnāds) are omitted. Although the book contains mostly sayings (qawlī ḥadīths), a small section is also devoted to actions (fiʿlī ḥadīths). In the section devoted to the prohibitions of the Islamic prophet Muhammad, hadiths beginning with the verb “nahā” (“he forbade”) are presented.

== Description ==
As-Saghir is a non-primary hadith work which contains 10,031 hadith. Al-Suyuti extracted all of the hadiths related to Muhammad's speech contrary to Muhammad's actions and compiled them in his smaller collection entitling it Jami al-Saghir.

The collection mainly consists of short hadiths, often one or a few sentences in length, and deals primarily with topics such as creed (ʿaqīdah), etiquette and manners (Adab), medicine, encouragement and warning (targhīb wa tarhīb), knowledge, supplication and remembrance (dua and dhikr), repentance (tawba) and forgiveness (istighfar), and the Prophet's character and virtues (shamāʾil and faḍāʾil). Legal (aḥkām) hadiths are almost absent. The transmitters of the hadiths and the sources where they appear are indicated by symbols (rumūz) placed at the end of each hadith.

== Literary sources ==
The main sources of the work are: the Kutub al-Sittah, Aḥmad b. Ḥanbal's Musnad, his son ʿAbd Allāh's Zawāʾid upon the Musnad, al-Ḥākim al-Nīsābūrī's al-Mustadrak, al-Bukhārī's al-Adab al-Mufrad and al-Tārīkh al-Kabīr, Ibn Ḥibbān's Ṣaḥīḥ, al-Ṭabarānī's three Muʿjams, Saʿīd b. Manṣūr's Sunan, the Muṣannafs of Ibn Abī Shaybah, the Muṣannafs of ʿAbd al-Razzāq, Abū Yaʿlā al-Mawṣilī's al-Musnad al-Kabīr, al-Dāraquṭnī's Sunan, al-Daylamī's Musnad al-Firdaws, Abū Nuʿaym's Ḥilyat al-Awliyāʾ, Abū Bakr al-Bayhaqī's al-Sunan al-Kubrā and Shuʿab al-Īmān, Ibn ʿAdī's al-Kāmil, al-ʿUqaylī's al-Ḍuʿafāʾ, al-Khaṭīb al-Baghdādī's Tārīkh Baghdād, Aḥmad b. ʿAlī al-Mawhibī's Kitāb al-ʿIlm, Abū Mūsā al-Madīnī's Kitāb al-Dhayl, Abū’l-Faraj Ibn al-Jawzī''s al-ʿIlal al-Mutanāhiya, al-Qarrāb's Kitāb Faḍl al-Ramī, al-Mustaġfirī's Kitāb al-Ṭibb, and Ibn ʿAbd al-Barr al-Namarī's Jāmiʿ Bayān al-ʿIlm. Al-Suyūṭī used symbols for works he benefited from most, while he wrote out the titles of those he used less frequently.

== Authenticity ==
Al-Suyūṭī states that he did not include any hadiths transmitted by narrators known to have fabricated hadiths or accused of lying, and that he devised his own method to indicate the strength of each hadith. According to him, all hadiths taken from al-Bukhārī, Muslim, Ibn Ḥibbān, al-Ḥākim, and Ḍiyāʾ al-Dīn al-Maqdisī are considered ṣaḥīḥ. If any of the hadiths taken from al-Mustadrak have been criticized, he notes them explicitly. He also regards as ṣaḥīḥ the narrations he transmits from Imām Mālik's al-Muwaṭṭaʾ, Ibn Khuzaymah's Ṣaḥīḥ, Abū ʿAwānah al-Wāsiṭī's al-Musnad al-Mukharraj, Ibn al-Sakan's Ṣaḥīḥ, Ibn al-Jārūd's al-Muntaqā, and the hadiths included by Abū Dāwūd in his Sunan without any criticism.

By contrast, since the works of al-Tirmidhī, Ibn Mājah, Abū Dāwūd al-Ṭayālisī, Aḥmad b. Ḥanbal, ʿAbd al-Razzāq, Saʿīd b. Manṣūr, Ibn Abī Shaybah, Abū Yaʿlā al-Mawṣilī, al-Ṭabarānī's al-Muʿjam al-Kabīr and al-Muʿjam al-Awsaṭ, al-Dāraquṭnī, Abū Nuʿaym, and al-Bayhaqī contain both ṣaḥīḥ, ḥasan, and ḍaʿīf narrations, he indicates the status of each hadith taken from these sources individually. Hadiths drawn from al-ʿUqaylī, Ibn ʿAdī, al-Khaṭīb al-Baghdādī, Ibn ʿAsākir, al-Ḥākim al-Tirmidhī, al-Ḥākim al-Nīsābūrī's Tārīkh Nīsābūr, Ibn al-Najjār al-Baghdādī's Dhayl Tārīkh Baghdād, and al-Daylamī’s Musnad al-Firdaws are classified as weak (ḍaʿīf).

In assessing hadiths as ṣaḥīḥ, ḥasan, or ḍaʿīf, al-Suyūṭī used the symbols (صح), (ح), and (ض) respectively. However, due to the carelessness of copyists and printers, these symbols were sometimes written incorrectly. Therefore, as ʿAbd al-Raʾūf al-Munāwī noted, it is not reliable to depend solely on these markings. A poem summarizing the symbols used in the work—titled Ḍawʾ al-Qabas al-Munīr li-Rumūz Rijāl al-Jāmiʿ al-Ṣaghīr was composed in thirty-six verses by Aḥmad b. Makkī al-Ḥamawī al-Ḥasanī in 1056 AH (1646 CE) and published by Muḥammad Bāqir ʿUlwān in Majallat Maʿhad al-Makhṭūṭāt al-ʿArabiyya (Cairo, 1975, vol. XXI, pp. 142–147). ʿUlwān had earlier published another article titled Thalāthu Arājīz fī Rumūz al-Jāmiʿ al-Ṣaghīr in the same journal.

According to al-Suyūṭī, the hadiths in al-Jāmiʿ al-Ṣaghīr are generally ṣaḥīḥ or ḥasan, though some weak ones are included. Some scholars, however, claim that fabricated (mawḍūʿ) hadiths are also present. Nāṣir al-Dīn al-Albānī explains the inclusion of some hadiths that al-Suyūṭī himself labelled mawḍūʿ in his al-Laʾālī al-Maṣnūʿa and its supplement as due to al-Suyūṭī not having had the opportunity to evaluate them properly. The number of hadiths in the collection is variously reported as 10,031 or 10,934, but Yūsuf b. Ismāʿīl al-Nabahānī, after a careful count, determined the correct number to be 10,010.

Independent works have been written to verify the authenticity levels of the hadiths in al-Jāmiʿ al-Ṣaghīr. In Fayḍ al-Qadīr, al-Munāwī not only provided commentary on the text but also examined the chains of transmission, carefully evaluating and scrutinizing the authenticity of the ḥadīths. ʿAlī b. Aḥmad b. Saʿīd, known as Bā Sabrayn, gathered the sound narrations in his Ithāf al-Nāqid al-Baṣīr bi-Khuṣūṣ Ṣaḥīḥ (bi-Qawiyy) Aḥādīth al-Jāmiʿ al-Ṣaghīr, completed in 1266 AH (1850 CE). Among more recent studies is that of Nāṣir al-Dīn al-Albānī, who, based on al-Fatḥ al-Kabīr, evaluated 8,202 narrations as ṣaḥīḥ or ḥasan and published them in two volumes under the title Ṣaḥīḥ al-Jāmiʿ al-Ṣaghīr wa Ziyādatuh (Beirut, 1406/1986), while classifying 6,469 narrations as “weak,” “very weak,” or “fabricated” and publishing them in six volumes as Ḍaʿīf al-Jāmiʿ al-Ṣaghīr wa Ziyādatuh (Beirut, 1398/1978). Abū’l-Fayḍ Ibn al-Ṣiddīq al-Ghumārī also compiled 453 fabricated hadiths allegedly found in al-Jāmiʿ al-Ṣaghīr in a small book titled al-Mughīr ʿalā al-Aḥādīth al-Mawḍūʿa fī al-Jāmiʿ al-Ṣaghīr (Beirut, 1402/1982).

== Supplementary ==
Al-Suyūṭī later added 4,440 hadiths in a supplement titled Ziyādat al-Jāmiʿ, which Yūsuf al-Nabahānī arranged alphabetically within their respective places in the main text. This expanded version was published in three volumes under the title al-Fatḥ al-Kabīr fī Ḍamm al-Ziyādah ilā al-Jāmiʿ al-Ṣaghīr (Cairo, 1351/1932). Al-Muttaqī al-Hindī rearranged the hadiths of al-Jāmiʿ al-Ṣaghīr and Ziyādat al-Jāmiʿ al-Ṣaghīr according to jurisprudential chapters and titled his work Manhaj al-ʿUmmāl fī Sunan al-Aqwāl.

== Commentary ==
Given its importance, it is appropriate to briefly provide information about the Fayḍ al-Qadīr commentary. As is known, many commentaries have been written on Suyuti's el-Jami' al-Saghir. The principal commentaries (shurūḥ) on al-Jāmiʿ al-Ṣaghīr are as follows:

1. Al-Kawkab al-Munīr by al-Suyūṭī’s student Ibn al-ʿAlqamī, with copies preserved in the Süleymaniye Library (Hamidiye 301–303; Şehid Ali Paşa 454–456).
2. Al-Istidrāk al-Naḍīr ʿalā al-Jāmiʿ al-Ṣaghīr by Aḥmad b. Muḥammad al-Matbūlī al-Anṣārī. According to Abū’l-Wafāʾ al-Marāghī’s research, one volume is in the Azhar Library, one in the Dār al-Kutub al-Miṣriyya (Talʿat Collection, no. 597), and another—titled al-Miṣbāḥ al-Bāriʿ al-Naḍīr wa al-Miftāḥ li al-Jāmiʿ al-Ṣaghīr—in the Bibliothèque Nationale (no. 767). The locations of the remaining volumes are unknown.
3. Fayḍ al-Qadīr Sharḥ al-Jāmiʿ al-Ṣaghīr by al-Munāwī, is the most highly regarded of all commentaries. The work was published in 8 volumes with the vowelled and numbered text of al-Jāmiʿ al-Ṣaghīr printed at the top of each page . Finding this commentary too lengthy, al-Munāwī later abridged it as al-Taysīr bi-Sharḥ al-Jāmiʿ al-Ṣaghīr, which appeared in two volumes (Cairo, 1286 AH). He is also reported to have begun a commentary on the supplement titled Miftāḥ al-Saʿāda bi-Sharḥ al-Ziyādah, though it remained unfinished.
4. Al-Sirāj al-Munīr bi-Sharḥ al-Jāmiʿ al-Ṣaghīr three-volume work by ʿAlī al-Būlāqī, known as al-ʿAzīzī, which was printed several times (Cairo 1286, 1292, 1304, 1305, 1312).

== Editions ==
Al-Jāmiʿ al-Ṣaghīr was first printed in Cairo in 1286 AH and has since been reprinted many times. The Cairo edition published together with Fayḍ al-Qadīr is also considered reliable. Because of its short hadith texts, alphabetical order, concise indication of sources by symbols, and other features, the book became highly practical and widely used. Ottoman scholars held the work in great esteem and counted it among their primary hadith sources. For instance, Mehmed ʿĀrif Bey selected all but one of the hadiths in his 1001 Hadiths from al-Jāmiʿ al-Ṣaghīr. Mehmed Zihnī Efendi, in his work al-Ḥaqāʾiq mimmā fī al-Jāmiʿ al-Ṣaghīr wa al-Mashāriq min ḥadīth khayr al-khalāʾiq, wrote the biographies of the Companions mentioned as transmitters in al-Jāmiʿ al-Ṣaghīr (Istanbul, 1311 AH), though the section from the letter “Ḍād” (ض) onward was never published.

== Al-Jami' al-Kabir ==
As-Saghir is an abridgement of al-Suyuti's larger work al-Jami' al-Kabir. His attempt to compile all of the remaining hadiths in one massive collection, the Jami al-Kabir, was incomplete when he died. What remained was published in 30 large volumes, showcasing around nine to ten alphabetic orderings of the prophetic traditions.

Which in turn was further ordered and arranged in al-Mutaqqi al-Hindi's work Kanz al-Ummal.

== See also ==
- List of Sunni books
- List of hadith books
- Fayd al-Qadir
