= Khalifa ibn Khayyat =

Arab historian of Abbasid era (777–854)

Imam Khalifa ibn Khayyat
- خليفة ابن خياط
- Title: Al-ʿallāmah ('The erudite scholar') - Al-Ḥāfiẓ

Personal life
- Born: c. 160 AH / 776–7 CE Basra, Iraq, Abbasid Caliphate
- Died: 240 AH / 854–5 CE Basra, Iraq, Abbasid Caliphate
- Era: Islamic golden age
- Region: Mesopotamia
- Notable works: Al-Tāʾrīk̲h̲; Ṭabaḳāt al-Ḳurrāʾ

Religious life
- Religion: Islam
- Profession: Safflower trader

Muslim leader
- Teacher: Hisham ibn al-Kalbi, Al-Mada'ini, Sufyan ibn ʽUyaynah
- Students: Ahmad Ibn Hanbal, Baqi bin Makhlad, Abu Yaʽla al-Mawsili, Abu Hatim al-Razi, Al-Darimi
- Influenced: Bukhari

Military service
- Arabic name
- Personal (Ism): Khalīfa خَلِيفَة
- Patronymic (Nasab): ibn Khayyāṭ ibn Khalīfa ibn Khayyāṭ بن خَيَّاط بن خَلِيفَة بن خَيَّاط
- Teknonymic (Kunya): Abū ʿAmr أبو عَمْر
- Epithet (Laqab): Shabāb شَبَاب
- Toponymic (Nisba): al-ʿUṣfūrī al-Shaybānī al-Dhuhlī al-Tamīmī al-Laythī العُصْفُرِيّ الشَّيْبَانِيّ الذُّهْلِيّ التَّمِيمِيّ اللَّيْثِيّ

Khalīfa bin Khayyāṭ bin Khalifa bin Khayyāṭ al-ʿUṣfūrī al-Shaybānī al-Dhuhlī al-Tamīmī al-Laythī Abū ʿAmr Shabāb (Arabic: خليفة بن خياط بن خليفة بن خياط العصفوري الشيباني الذهلي التميمي الليثي أبو عمرو شباب; 777–855) commonly known by his nickname Shabab or simply Khalifa Ibn Khayyat was a Basran Arab Islamic scholar, traditionist, historian, chronicler and genealogist.

A member of a scholarly Basran family of hadith transmitters, he became known primarily for his contributions to history and biographical literature. His Taʾrīkh is the earliest extant Islamic chronicle, covering events from the Prophet’s life to 232/847, while his Ṭabaqāt is one of the earliest surviving Islamic biographical dictionaries, cataloguing more than three thousand transmitters of hadith.

== Biography ==
=== Name and lineage ===
He main nisba in later biographical dictionaries is al-ʿUṣfurī. Al-Sam'ani, Ibn al-Athir and Ibn Khallikan maintain that this nisba derives from the Arabic word for safflower (ʿuṣfur), a plant which was used to dye cloth red, and thus refers to some involvement in the safflower trade, although his family connection to this is unknown. Al-Mizzi cites Al-Khatib al-Baghdadi, who says that ʿuṣfur refers to a certain subtribe of the Arabs, but this might refer to ʿuṣfūr and the nisba al-ʿUṣfūrī, which is different from al-ʿUṣfurī. Khalifa was given the nickname al-Shabāb ('the youth'), to distinguish him from his grandfather who also held the same name.

Ibn al-Athir mentions the alleged tribal affiliation of Khalifa as "ar-Raqashi" i.e from the Banū Rāqash, a branch of Banu Tamim. Ibn al-Athir also mentions Khalifa as a descendant of Shayban bin Dhuhl bin Tha‘laba bin ‘Ukaba bin Sa‘b bin ‘Ali bin Bakr bin Wa’il. The genealogy of Bakr bin Wa’il is eventually traced back to Asad bin Rabi‘a bin Nizar bin Ma‘dd bin ‘Adnan.

=== Early life and family ===
Khalifa Ibn Khayyat was born around 160 AH / 776–7 CE in Basra, Iraq. In his Ṭabaqāt, he does not mention his own full lineage, despite listing his own grandfather, Abū Hubayra Khalīfa bin Khayyāṭ (d. 160/777), who was also a prominent hadith transmitter. His father, Khayyāṭ bin Khalīfa bin Khayyāṭ, is not mentioned in the Ṭabaqāt, but he was also a hadith transmitter, although less prominent than his father and son.The exact social position of Khalīfa’s father and grandfather is unclear, but the biographicies about them show that Khalifa came from a Basran family involved in hadith scholarship.

=== Later life ===
Little is known about Khalifa's life. His express juridical-theological position is also unknown. Ibn al-Nadim lists Ibn Khayyat among the traditionist-jurisprudents. He is reported to have been among the Basran notables who accompanied the city's judge, Aḥmad ibn Riyāḥ, to defend Ahmad against the charges of Mutazila opponents during the Mihna under the caliph Al-Wathiq (r. 842–847), around 229/843–4, likely in Samarra or Baghdad. The charges against Ahmad that he had been persecuting Mutazilites, was not proven and the case was dismissed. This suggests that Khalifa was suspected of rejecting caliphal doctrine, particularly that the Quran was created. This is also the only recorded instance where he left Basra.

Besides Khalifa's expertise in ḥadīth and akhbār, Ibn al-Jazari mentions him as a transmitter of qira'at. Ibn al-Jazari mentions that Aḥmad bin Ibrāhīm bin ʿUthmān al-Warrāq and al-Mughīra bin Ṣadaqa studied qira'ats under him, but he seems to have confused Shabab (Khalifa) with Shababa bin Sawwar al-Fazari.

=== Death ===
Khalifa died in 240 AH / 854–5 CE in Basra. Al-Dhahabi wrote in Siyar A'lam al-Nubala' that he died in his eighties without naming the source for his information.

=== Hadith transmittion ===
Al-Mizzi counted ninety teachers whom Khalifa transmitted hadith from and thirty-six students who narrated hadith from him. His reputation as a traditionist was mixed. His reputation as a traditionist was mixed. Early hadith critics expressed differing views on his reliability: some leading third/ninth-century scholars were critical of his transmissions, while Al-Bukhari regarded his narrations as acceptable and occasionally cited them in Sahih al-Bukhari in corroboration of other reports. By the fourth/tenth century, later authorities such as Ibn Hibban and Ibn ʿAdī came to describe him as thiqa (reliable) or ṣadūq (sincere). Both, however, emphasized that Khalifa’s principal scholarly contributions lay not in hadith transmission but in his two major compilations in history and ʿilm al-rijāl.

Several critical assessments of Khalifa’s reliability as a ḥadīth transmitter are recorded from his contemporaries in the third/ninth century. Yahya ibn Ma'in is reported to have said that Khalifa "was not specialists in hadith." Abu Hatim al-Razi said about Khalīfa "I do not transmit from him; he is not strong." Abu Zurʽa al-Razi is said to have refrained from reading out hadith that he had received from Khalifa and even struck it out in his notes. Al-ʿUqaylī likewise included Khalifa in his work on weak transmitters.

Some early critics were more positive about Khalifa’s capacity as a hadith transmitter. The earliest is Muhammad al-Bukhari, who cites Khalifa twenty-one times in Sahih al-Bukhari. However, Ibn Hajar points out that al-Bukhari’s reports from Khalifa generally serve to corroborate parallel isnāds, and that when he transmits uniquely from Khalifa, he introduces the report with the formula "Khalīfa said to me" rather than the standard "He narrated to me." This suggests that Bukhari regarded Khalifa's transmissions as acceptable for purposes of corroboration, but not of the same rank as those of the most reliable authorities (thiqāt) on whom he relied without supporting isnāds.

A defence of Khalifa’s status as a reliable transmitter was written by Ibn 'Adī. Ibn 'Adī concludes that Khalifa was upright in hadith transmission and sincere. Khalifa is likewise counted among the reliable narrators by Ibn Hibban, who adds that he was accurate and particularly knowledgeable about history and genealogy. Moreover, Ibn Hibban narrates three reports with isnāds going through Khalifa in Sahih Ibn Hibban. Maslama ibn al-Qāsim al-Andalusī said about Khalifa "There is no problem with him". Abū l-Walīd recognised Khalifa as a great authority in his own hadith.

== Works ==
- Al-Tāʾrīk̲h̲ ('The Chronicle')

The Taʾrīkh is extant in only one manuscript (Rabat, Maktabat al-Awqaf, ms. 199, in National library of Syria). It is a recension by the Cordoban scholar Baqi ibn Makhlad (d. 889), who had travelled to Iraq. It was written in Al-Andalus in 477 / 1084. The copy was found in Morocco, in a single volume of 168 folios.

Khalifa's Tārīkh is the oldest Islamic chronicle still extant. Khalifa commences his book by defining the word Tarikh in Islam and among pre-Islamic peoples. Then he covers the years 1–232 AH (622-847 CE) annalistically according to the lunar Hijri calendar. The Prophet's birth follows, before the main annalistic entries on the Medinan period of Prophet's life and the caliphs. These combine reports attributed to earlier authorities with laconic notes on holders of governorships, leadership of the Hajj, campaigns against Byzantium, and the deaths of officials and traditionists. After the caliphate of Harun al-Rashid (r. 786–809), the chronicle consists only of very terse notes that reflect the official historiography of Al-Ma'mun (r. 813–833) and subsequent caliphs. Ibn Khayyat's many sources include Ibn Ishaq and Al-Mada'ini. He gives special attention to the Umayyad Caliphate and to Muslim foreign affairs, in particular to the extension of the Islamic Empire. He usually narrates each event from two points of view, local and official. He pays little attention to Islamic internal affairs, but he does deal with such decisive events as the Assassination of Uthman, Battle of Siffin, Battle of al-Harra, the Kharijites movements.

- Al-Ṭabaqāt ('The Book of Generations')

The Ṭabaḳāt al-Ḳurrāʾ is also extant in a single manuscript only. The unique copy was made by one of the Khalifa's disciples, probably during the Khalifa's life-time, consisting of 97 folios. It is currently located in Zahiriyya Library. It is one of the earliest Islamic biographical dictionaries to have survived. It contains the biographies of 3375 individuals, 3246 men and 129 women, who were cited as authorities for Islamic traditions during the first 236 years of Islam.

Khalifa composed his book in a different way from his contemporary Ibn Sa'd. He begins by enumerating the men who were authorities in tradition and lived in Medina, commencing with the Prophet, then the members of Quraysh, group by group according to their pedigree and their relation to the Prophet; then the members of the other Arab tribes. He then takes the Muslim cities and centres and deals with them in a similar manner. The author’s biographical accounts are generally brief, but the significance of the book lies in the fact of its completeness and the close attention which Khalifa pays to genealogy.

- Ṭabaqāt al-qurrāʾ ('The Generations of the Qurʾān Reciters')

Lost Work. The only citations of this work in later works appear to be a few narrations in Ibn Asakir's Tārīkh madīnat Dimashq and al-Mizzi’s and Ibn Hajar’s biographical entries on Sa'īd bin Abi l-Hasan al-Basri.

- Taʾrīk̲h̲ al-Zamnā wa ’l-ʿurd̲j̲ān wa ’l-marḍā wa ’l-ʿumyān ('The History of the Chronically ill, the Lame, the Diseased and the Blind')

Lost Work.

- Kitāb Ad̲j̲zāʾ al-Ḳurʾān wa-aʿs̲h̲ārihi wa-asbāʿihi wa-āyātih ('The Thirtieths, Tenths, Sevenths and Verses of the Qurʾān')

Lost Work.
