= Sharh =

Commentaries on hadith collections

Sharh (pl. shuruh, literally "explanation" or "expounding") or hadith commentary is a category of Islamic scholarship that examines the meaning, historical context, and legal implications the hadiths (sayings, actions, and silent approvals of the Prophet Muhammad), to explore the deeper spiritual and philosophical meanings, such as the intentions behind good deeds. The intention is to enable readers understand and apply the hadiths to their daily lifves. The hadiths referred to events and actions in the 7th-century and were later compiled into several collections over the 8th-11th centuries CE. The commentaries explain the historical context of specific hadiths, indicating if it was meant for a specific time and person or had wider implications. This led to the sharh writers extracting Islamic rules (Fiqh) from the Hadiths, often leaning towards one or other of the legal schools (Madhhabs) in their interpretations for subjects such as worship, marriage, and ethics. Some commentators also provided analyses of difficult grammar and vocabulary.

== Sunni commentaries ==
=== Sahih al-Bukhari ===
Sahih al-Bukhari
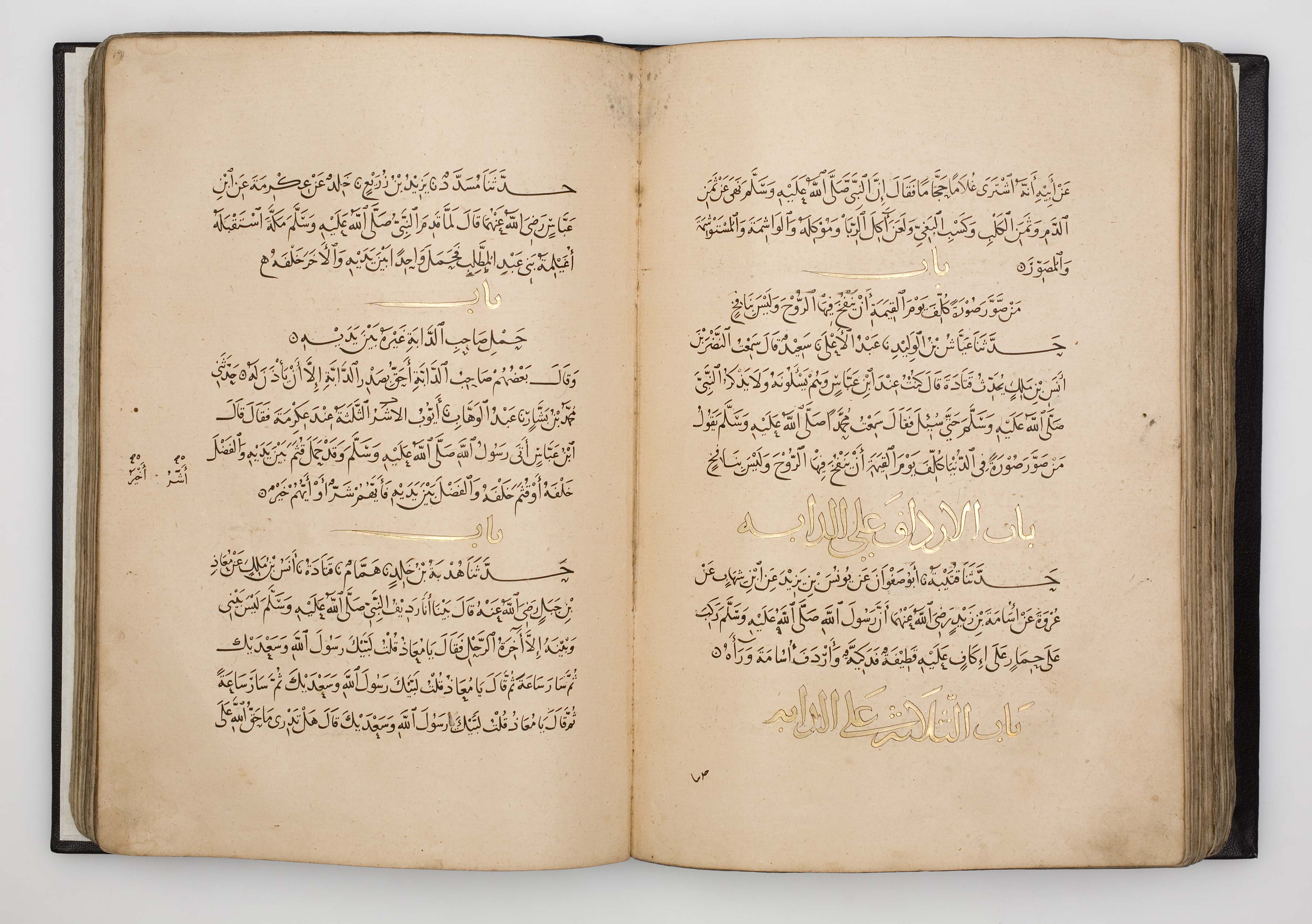
- Manuscript of Sahih al-Bukhari from the 14/15th-century
- Author: Al-Bukhari
- Language: Arabic
- Series: Kutub al-Sittah
- Genre: Hadith collection
- ISBN: 978-1-56744-519-0
- OCLC: 47899632
- Original text: Sahih al-Bukhari at Arabic Wikisource

The Sahih al-Bukhari is the first and most acclaimed Hadith collection of the Six Books of Sunni Islam. Compiled by Muhammad al-Bukhari (d. 870 CE) in the musannaf format, the work is valued by Sunni Muslims alongside Sahih Muslim as the most authentic Islamic text after the Quran. It is estimated that more than "seventy full commentaries have been written" about this collection.

Al-Bukhari organised the book mostly in the Hijaz at the Sacred Mosque of Mecca and the Prophet's Mosque of Medina, and completed the work in Bukhara around 846 CE (232 AH). The work was examined by his teachers Ahmad ibn Hanbal, Ali ibn al-Madini, Yahya ibn Ma'in, and others. The following is a list of some of the commentaries written by later scholars, examining Sahih al-Bukhari.

- A'lam al-Sunan is a commentary written by the Shafi'i scholar Al-Khattabi. It is considered the first surviving commentary on Sahih al-Bukhari. Although the author did not assign a formal title, the work became known as A'lam al-Sunan. The commentary was composed to clarify difficult or ambiguous expressions in Sahih al-Bukhari, presenting explanations from a theological perspective. It is comparatively concise in nature, covering 1,238 hadiths from Sahih al-Bukhari.
- Al-Abwab wa al-Tarajim is a three-volume Arabic commentary written by Zakariyya Kandhlawi. It serves as an analysis and explanation of the chapters and narrators found in Sahih al-Bukhari, one of the most esteemed collections of Hadith. The commentary is the result of four decades of effort by the author. In this commentary, Kandhlawi presents seventy principles that aid in understanding the chapter headings of Sahih al-Bukhari. He provides commentary on each chapter, illustrating the connections between the chapter headings and the related hadiths. This work addresses the challenge faced by scholars in establishing these connections, contributing to the scholarly discourse surrounding Sahih al-Bukhari.
- Al-Kawakib al-Darari is a commentary authored by the Shafi'i scholar Shams al-Din al-Kirmani. The work was written to provide a comprehensive explanation of Sahih al-Bukhari, addressing gaps and limitations in earlier commentaries, including those by Ibn Battal, al-Khattabi, and Mughultay. It was completed in 1373 CE in Mecca. A modern edition of the work was published in twenty-five volumes in Cairo between 1935 and 1945.
- Al-Tawdhih is a commentary written by the Shafi'i scholar Ibn al-Mulaqqin. It is the largest and most detailed commentary on Sahih al-Bukhari. Modern printed editions comprise thirty-six volumes. Ibn al-Mulaqqin worked on this commentary for more than two decades, beginning around 763 AH and completing it in 785 AH.
- Anwar al-Bari is a 19-volume Urdu commentary compiled by Ahmad Rida Bijnori, drawing from the teachings of Anwar Shah Kashmiri. This commentary features the original Arabic text of Sahih al-Bukhari alongside a literal Urdu translation, enhancing its accessibility to a wider audience. It provides biographical information about hadith scholars and narrators in the transmission chains, as well as delves into various facets of Islamic jurisprudence and theology. The work extensively defends the validity of the Hanafi school of jurisprudence. The compiler, however, only completed the commentary up to the end of the Book of Prayer, accompanied by a discussion on the final chapter concerning Imaan (faith) and Tawhid (monotheism).
- Fath al-Bari, is a 15th-century commentary by Egyptian scholar Ibn Hajar al-Asqalani. Considered his magnum opus, it is a widely celebrated hadith commentary.
- Fayd al-Bari is a four-volume Arabic commentary compiled by Badre Alam Merathi, based on the lectures and teachings of his teacher, Anwar Shah Kashmiri. It offers detailed explanations, interpretations, and discussions of the Hadiths found in Sahih al-Bukhari. This commentary covers various aspects, including the biography of Muhammad al-Bukhari, the methodology and conditions of compiling Sahih al-Bukhari, the narrators of the Hadiths, the connections between chapter headings and the Hadiths within them, discussions on beliefs (aqaid), and attempts to derive legal rulings (fiqh) from the Hadiths. Additionally, the work includes a lengthy introduction by Yusuf Banuri, which provides insights into the biography of Anwar Shah Kashmiri.
- Irshad al-Sari is a classical commentary written by the Shafi‘i scholar al-Qastallani. He completed the work in 1517 CE, seven years before his death. Unlike earlier commentaries, it explains each word in a clear and concise way, sometimes repeating key points to ensure understanding. This approach makes it accessible to readers of all levels. Historically, it has been considered the third most important commentary on Sahih al-Bukhari, after Fath al-Bari and Umdat al-Qari. In writing it, al-Qastallani relied heavily on Fath al-Bari, occasionally summarizing its explanations.
- Kashf al-Bari is a 24-volume Arabic commentary on Sahih al-Bukhari, authored by Saleemullah Khan. It originates from his lectures at Jamia Farooqia, and the compilation process commenced around 1986–1987, spanning approximately four hundred notebooks. The manuscript underwent subsequent refinement by scholars, starting with Ibn al-Hasan Abbasi. Khan adopted the pedagogical approach of his mentor, Hussain Ahmad Madani, in teaching and explicating Sahih al-Bukhari. The book was initially published in Pakistan before reaching an audience in India.
- Lami al-Darari is a multi-volume commentary, which is based on the teachings of Rashid Ahmad Gangohi. The original lessons were recorded in Arabic by Yahya Kandhlawi, a student of Gangohi, and later expanded upon by his son, Zakariyya Kandhlawi, with extensive footnotes at the insistence of Hussain Ahmad Madani. The commentary was completed in 1968. Its primary objective is to provide detailed explanations, discussions, and insights into the various sections, topics, and issues addressed in Sahih al-Bukhari. Additionally, it incorporates additional research, references to other scholarly works, and offers a defense of the Hanafi school of jurisprudence.
- Sharh Ibn Battal is a classical commentary authored by the Maliki scholar Ibn Battal. Although the original title of the work is unknown, it is traditionally attributed to him and is considered one of the earliest printed commentaries on Sahih al-Bukhari, following Al-Khattabi's A'lam al-Sunan. The commentary combines hadith analysis with Maliki jurisprudence, addressing legal reasoning, philology, historical context, ethical guidance, and preserving material from sources that are now lost, including reports from the Companions of the Prophet, the Successors, and later generations.
- Umdat al-Qari is a classical commentary on Sahih al-Bukhari by the Hanafi scholar Badr al-Din al-Ayni. Al-Ayni worked on the book for over twenty years, starting in 1418 CE and finishing in 1443 CE.

=== Sahih Muslim ===
Ṣaḥīḥ Muslim
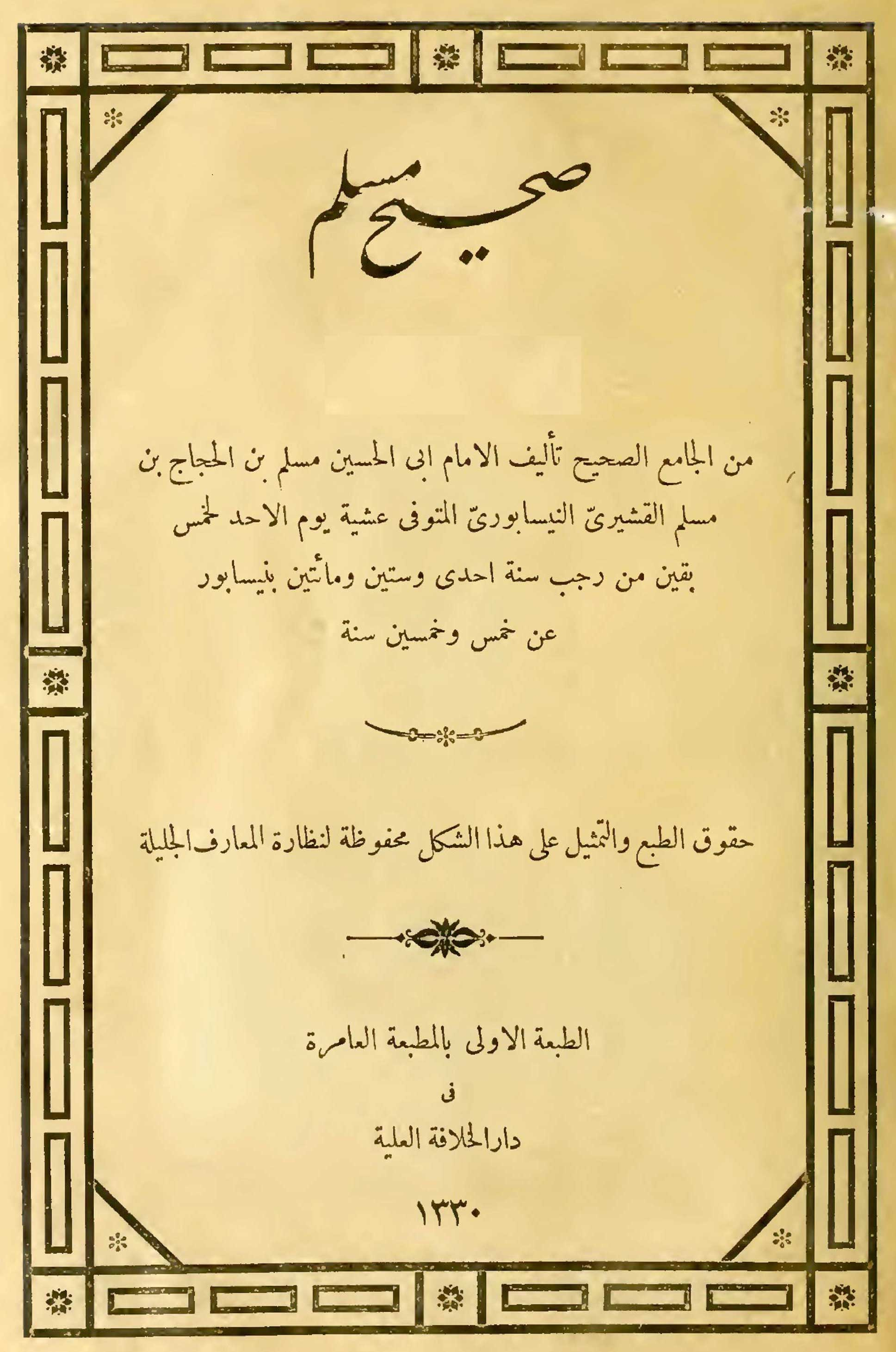
- copy of Sahih Muslim from 1910
- Author: Muslim ibn al-Ḥajjāj (c. 822–875)
- Language: Arabic, Persian
- Series: Kutub al-Sittah
- Genre: Hadith collection
- Published: 9th century
- Original text: Ṣaḥīḥ Muslim at Arabic Wikisource

Sahih Muslim is the second hadith collection of the Six Books of Sunni Islam. Compiled by Muslim ibn al-Hajjaj (d. 875) in the musannaf format, the work is valued by Sunnis, alongside Sahih al-Bukhari (see section above), as the most important sources for Muslims after the Quran.

Sahih Muslim contains approximately 5,500 - 7,500 hadith reports in its introduction and 56 "books". Kâtip Çelebi (died 1657) and Siddiq Hasan Khan (died 1890) both counted 7,275 reports in the text. Muhammad Fuad Abdul Baqi wrote that there are 3,033 reports without considering repetitions. Mashhur ibn Hasan Al Salman, a student of Albanian scholar Al-Albani (died 1999), counted 7,385 total reports, which, combined with the ten in the introduction, add up to a total of 7,395. Muslim wrote an introduction to his collection of hadith, wherein he clarified the reasoning behind choosing the hadith he chose to include in his Sahih.

There have been more than twenty commentaries on Sahih Muslim, of which the two most notable are listed below.

- Siyanah Sahih Muslim – an explanation of Sahih Muslim written by Ibn al-Salah, of which only the first segment is available, and which al-Nawawi referred to in his own explanation.
- Fath al-Mulhim is a three-volume Arabic commentary on Sahih Muslim, written by Shabbir Ahmad Usmani before 1916. Usmani commenced the writing of the book in 1914 due to the absence of commentaries on Sahih Muslim, unlike Sahih al-Bukhari, which had commentaries according to the Hanafi school. He dedicated himself to bridging this gap and continued his work until his demise. He was only able to complete three volumes of the book before his passing. The first and second volumes were published in 1933 and 1935 respectively, while the third volume was published in 1939. Taqi Usmani later took up the task of completing the remaining portions of the book in 1976, ultimately finishing it in 1994 in six volumes known as Takmilah Fath al-Mulhim bi-Sharh Sahih al-Imam Muslim (see below).
- Takmilah Fath al-Mulhim is a six-volume Arabic commentary on Sahih Muslim, authored by Taqi Usmani. It serves as a supplement to Fath al-Mulhim bi-Sharh Sahih al-Imam Muslim (see above), a work initially written by Shabbir Ahmad Usmani, who completed three volumes before his demise. Taqi Usmani commenced writing this scholarly work in 1976, inspired by his father, Shafi Usmani, to carry on and complete the unfinished endeavor. After an 18-year journey, he finalized the book in 1994, earning widespread recognition for its quality. The commentary covers essential topics, including fiqh, justice, politics, economics, social policy, morality, virtues, and other aspects of Islamic teachings. Taqi Usmani's work is particularly known for its analysis, incorporation of diverse languages, inclusion of biographies, fiqh methodologies, and relevant fiqh rulings, making it a reference for both students and scholars alike.

=== Sunan Abi Dawud ===
Sunan Abi Dawud
- Seven-volume collection of Sunan Abi Dawud
- Author: Abu Dawud al-Sijistani
- Original title: سنن أبي داود
- Language: Arabic
- Series: Kutub al-Sitta
- Genre: Hadith collection

Sunan Abi Dawud is the third hadith collection of the Six Books of Sunni Islam. It was compiled by Abu Dawud al-Sijistani (d. 889).

- Badhl al-Majhud is an Arabic commentary on Sunan Abi Dawud, authored by Khalil Ahmad Saharanpuri. Widely acclaimed as the foremost work of its kind, it is esteemed by Islamic scholars worldwide. Completed over a decade in Medina, this book is an indispensable resource for those seeking to understand the nuances of Sunan Abu Dawood. In addition to providing clarification on Sunan Abi Dawud, Saharanpuri's commentary scrutinises and analyses narrations and traditions from other hadith collections, making it an invaluable reference work. Saharanpuri's commentary is characterized by impartiality and balance, presenting both sides of controversial issues with clarity and objectivity. The author supports his arguments with evidence, without showing any bias towards either perspective, making it a fair and comprehensive analysis of Sunan Abi Dawud and related traditions. Initially, Saharanpuri completed the commentary in five volumes, after which he dictated it to his student Zakariyya Kandhlawi due to his advancing age and tremors. Kandhlawi subsequently published a revised edition spanning 20 volumes, which has been hailed as a seminal contribution to Islamic scholarship.
- Sharh Sunan Abi Dawud is a 20-volume commentary on Sunan Abi Dawud. It was authored by the 9th-century AH (15th-century CE) Sunni scholar Ibn Raslān. This work is one of the most comprehensive and authoritative commentaries on this pivotal hadith collection. It thoroughly examines the hadiths, analyzes their chains of narration and textual meanings, and provides extensive interpretations and legal applications firmly grounded in the Shafi'i school of Islamic jurisprudence. The commentary is celebrated for its clarity and systematic presentation, making complex hadith accessible to a wide audience of students and scholars.

=== Sunan al-Tirmidhi ===
Sahih al-Tirmidhi
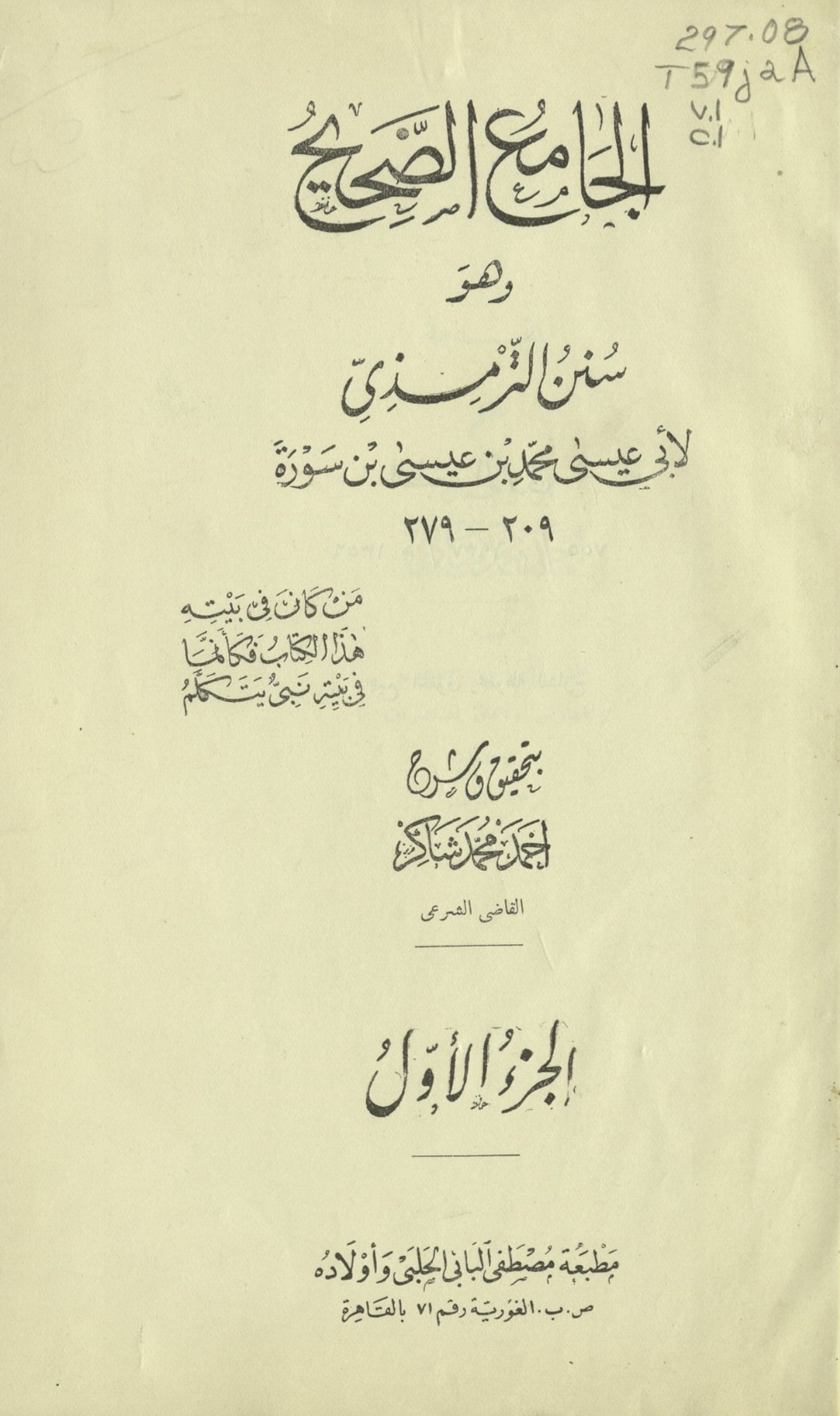
- Author: Al-Tirmidhi
- Language: Arabic
- Series: Kutub al-Sittah
- Genre: Hadith collection
- Published: 9th century

Sunan al-Tirmidhi is the fourth hadith collection of the Six Books of Sunni Islam. It was compiled by al-Tirmidhi in c. 864–884 (250–270 AH).

- Al-Arf al-Shadhi is a multi-volume Arabic commentary on Sunan al-Tirmidhi attributed to Muhammad Chiragh Punjabi, was crafted by synthesizing the annotations and teachings of Anwar Shah Kashmiri during his teaching career. Its initial publication dates back to 1919. Notably aligned with the Hanafi school of thought, the purpose of Kashmiri, as reflected in this work, extended beyond the clarification of ideas and grammatical intricacies; it predominantly aimed at establishing Abu Hanifa's elevated stature in the realm of jurisprudence. In 1968, Yusuf Banuri introduced Maarif al-Sunan (see below) across six volumes to address any identified discrepancies within Al-Arf al-Shadhi.
- Al-Kawakib al-Durri is a multi-volume commentary on Sahih al-Tirmidhi, which is based on the teachings of Rashid Ahmad Gangohi. The lessons were originally recorded in Arabic by his student, Yahya Kandhlawi, and later expanded upon with extensive footnotes by Yahya's son, Zakariyya Kandhlawi. The initial version, consisting of two volumes, was published in India in 1933 and 1934, while the subsequent version, including additional footnotes by Zakariyya Kandhlawi, was published in four volumes.
- Maarif al-Sunan is a six-volume Arabic commentary authored by Yusuf Banuri, who compiled the work based on the teachings and lectures of Anwar Shah Kashmiri. Published in 1968, the commentary aimed to address errors found in the older commentary called Al-Arf al-Shadhi (see above in this section), which was also based on the teachings of Anwar Shah Kashmiri.

=== Al-Muwatta ===
Muwatta Imam Malik
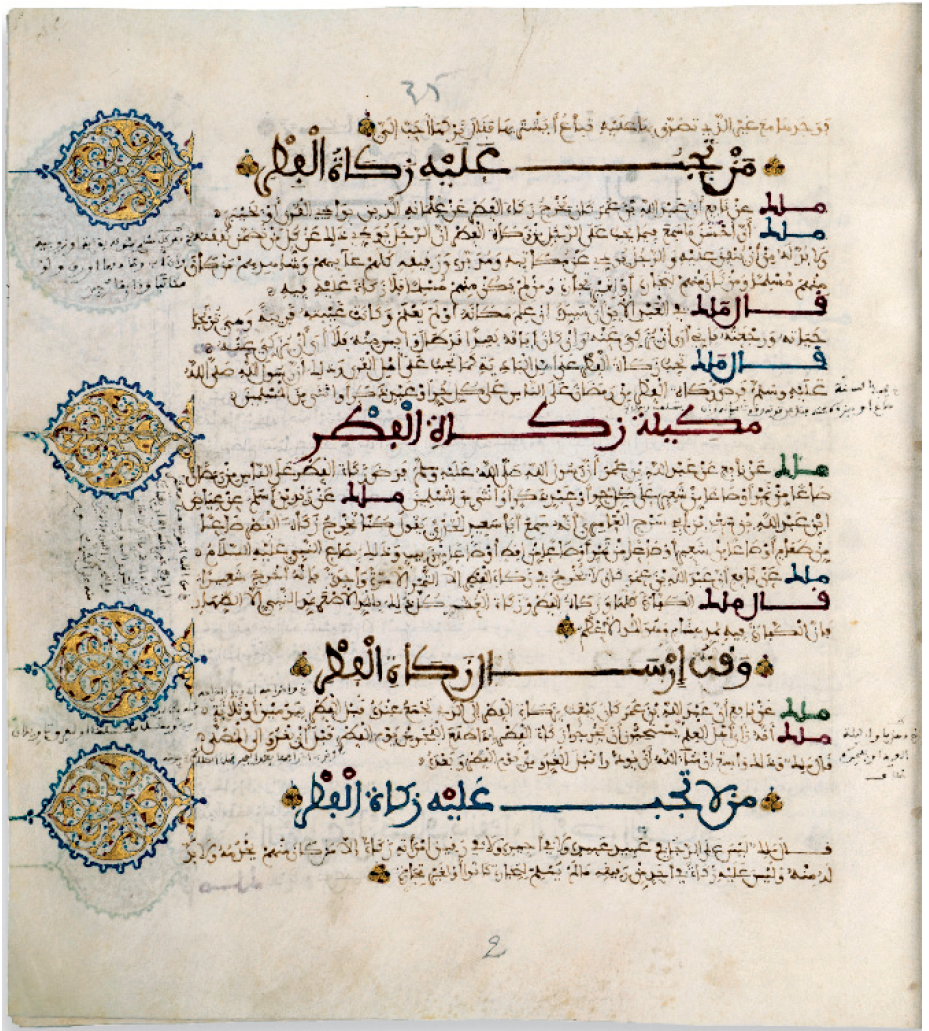
- Marinid manuscript of the Muwatta, dated 1326 CE
- Author: Imam Malik ibn Anas
- Original title: موطأ الإمام مالك
- Language: Arabic
- Genre: Hadith collection

Al-Muwatta is the sixth Hadith collection and was written by Malik ibn Anas (711–795) in the 8th century. It is also the earliest extant example of a musannaf, a genre of hadith compilation that arranges hadith topically. Al-Muwatta, was also the first legal work to incorporate and combine hadith and fiqh.

- Awjaz al-Masalik is an 18-volume Arabic commentary written by Zakariyya Kandhlawi. This work presents a detailed analysis of the Muwatta, including its various narrations, sources, and discussions on the legal rulings derived from the hadith, according to the four schools of thought. It covers not only the sources of the Maliki school but also evidence from the Hanafi school, making it one of the most important works of hadith commentary in the Hanafi school of Islamic jurisprudence. Its impact on Islamic scholarship has been profound.

Kandhlawi based his work on the commentary of Muhammad al-Zurqani. The first edition, published in India, consists of six volumes, while the second edition, printed in Cairo and Beirut, comprises fifteen volumes. The significance of this work lies not only in its academic rigor and scholarly insights but also in its accessibility to a wider audience, making it a popular reference for scholars and students of Islamic law alike.

=== Others ===
- Al-Isabah fi tamyiz al Sahabah is a multivolume commentary by Ibn Hajar Al Asqalani. The book is acclaimed for chronicling the accounts of the Companions of the Prophet, individuals who lived during the age of Muhammad. The work includes the biography of Muhammad, his companions' biographies, his wives' biographies, and the biographies of the tābiʿūn, the generation of believers who studied under the Companions.
- Al-Taleeq al-Sabeeh is a multi-volume commentary on the hadith collection known as Mishkat al-Masabih. It was written by Idris Kandhlawi in Arabic and first published in Damascus in 1935. The commentary aims to assist readers in studying and comprehending the hadiths in a scholarly manner. It covers various topics related to hadith sciences, such as the classification of hadiths, principles of hadith criticism, the reliability of narrators, and the criteria for accepting a hadith as authentic.
- Amani al-Ahbar is a 4-volume Arabic commentary on Sharh Ma'ani al-Athar, authored by Yusuf Kandhlawi. Due to the author's passing, he was unable to complete this commentary. He did manage to finish commenting on the final section of the chapters related to Witr. The first volume was finalized in 1959, followed by the second volume in 1962. After a hiatus caused by his teaching responsibilities, he later returned to the project, but it remained incomplete. The first two volumes were published in 1962, and the third and fourth volumes, in manuscript form, were brought to light by Zakariyya Kandhlawi in 1974.
- Fayd al-Qadir is a multi-volume commentary on al-Jāmiʿ al-Ṣaghīr, a collection of hadith compiled by Jalāl al-Dīn al-Suyūṭī. Authored by ʿAbd al-Raʾūf al-Munāwī (d. 1622), the work is regarded as his most renowned contribution to hadith scholarship. It provides an exhaustive explanation of al-Suyūṭī's compilation and remains widely studied among Sunni scholars and students.
- Hajjat al-Wada wa Umrat al-Nabi is a book written by Zakariyya Kandhlawi. It focuses on the Farewell Pilgrimage of Muhammad and provides a detailed account of the pilgrimage and its outcomes. It was written in a span of one day and one and a half nights in 1924. The book delves into the historical details and significance of the farewell pilgrimage, covering various aspects such as the rituals, legal rulings, historical events, scientific benefits, and hadith research related to both Hajj and Umrah. It aims to provide a deep understanding of the subject matter and serves as a resource for those interested in studying and exploring the Farewell Pilgrimage of Muhammad.
- I'la al-Sunan is a work that aims to clarify the role and importance of hadiths in the Hanafi school of Islamic thought, particularly in response to criticisms from the Ahl-i Hadith movement in India. Zafar Ahmad Usmani, the author, dedicated over twenty years to crafting the book, which includes more than 6,100 hadiths and their sources, along with evaluations of their chain of transmission and text. Ashraf Ali Thanwi, Usmani's teacher, entrusted him with the task of writing the book. In addition to its scholarly value, I'la al-Sunan also addresses contemporary issues and opposes certain movements, such as the Qadiani movement and efforts to make interest halal. The book has received praise for its objective evaluation of the opinions of the schools of Islamic law.

The first eleven volumes of I'la al-Sunan were published in Thana Bhawan from 1922 onwards, with the remaining volumes published in Karachi. Organized according to the chapters of Islamic jurisprudence, the book covers a broad range of topics, from purification and prayer to ethics and spirituality. The hadiths and statements of the Companions that support Hanafi views are cited with their sources at the top of the page, and weak narrations are included to support authentic narrations. The bottom of the page contains critiques of the narrations and their legal aspects, along with quotations from the reliable books of the Hanafi school where there are differences of opinion.

- Khasa'il Nabawi is an Urdu translation and commentary on the Ash-Shama'il al-Muhammadiyya. It was authored by Zakariyya Kandhlawi, who compiled and offered explanations for the narrations found within this book. This work marks Zakariyya Kandhlawi's debut composition, published in 1926 when he was 29 years old. It explores diverse aspects of the Prophet's physical attributes, character, habits, clothing, and other details that present a depiction of his life and teachings.
- Sharh al-'Aqa'id al-Nasafiyya
- Sharh al-Mawahib al-Ladunniyyah
- Sharh Ma'ani al-Athar
- Sharh Mushkil al-Athar

== Shia commentaries ==
=== Kitab al-Kafi ===
Kitāb al-Kāfī
- Arabic: ٱلْكَافِي
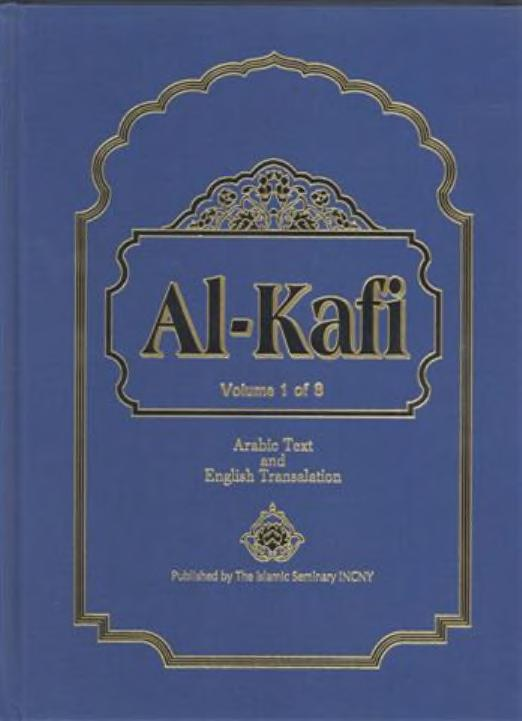
- Cover of the first volume of a modern edition of Al-Kafi

Information
- Religion: Islam (Twelver Shī‘ah)
- Author: Muḥammad ibn Yaʿqūb al-Kulaynī
- Language: Arabic
- Chapters: 35 (in 3 sections)

Kitab al-Kafi is a hadith collection, one of the Four Books of the Twelver Shīa tradition, compiled in the first half of the 10th century CE (early 4th century AH) by Muḥammad ibn Yaʿqūb al-Kulaynī (c. 868–941).

It is divided into three sections: Uṣūl al-Kāfī, dealing with epistemology, theology, history, ethics, supplication, and the Qurʾān; Furūʿ al-Kāfī, which is concerned with practical and legal issues; and Rawdat (or Rawḍat al-Kāfī), which includes miscellaneous traditions, many of which are lengthy letters and speeches transmitted from the imams. In total, al-Kāfī comprises 16,199 narrations. It reportedly took him twenty years to finish the book.

- Sharh Uṣul al-Kāfi, a commentary on Uṣul al-Kāfi by Mohammad Salih al-Mazandarani (17th century CE)
- Mir'at al-Uqul ('Mirror of the Mind'), a commentary on al-Kāfi by Mohammad-Baqer Majlesi (17th century CE)
- Sharh Uṣul al-Kāfi by Mulla Sadra (17th century CE)
- Șaḥīḥ al-Kāfi by Muhammad Baqir al-Behbudi (20th century CE)

=== Al-Istibsar ===
Al-Istibsar is the fourth hadith collection of the Four Books of Shia Islam. it was compiled by Persian scholar al-Tusi It includes the same subjects as Tahdhib al-Ahkam (Rectification of the Statutes) but in a shorter form.

- Jame'ul-Akhbar Fi Eizah-il-Istibsar by Sheikh Abdul-Latif ibn Ahmad ibn Abi Jam'e Harethi Shami Ameli.
- Nukatul-Irshad (Points of Guidance) by Muhammad Jamaluddin al-Makki al-Amili.
- Sharh-e-Istibsar (Explanations of Istibsar) by Sayyid Mirza Hasan ibn Abdul-Rasool Husseini Zonoozi Khu'ei (1172-1223 AH).
- Sharh-e-Istibsar (Explanations of Istibsar) by Amir Muhammad ibn Amir Abdul-Wassi' Khatoon Abadi (d.1116 AH).
- Sharh-e-Istibsar (Explanations of Istibsar) by Sheykh Abdul-Reza Tufaili Najafi.
- Explanations of Istibsar by Ibne Alwandi, Faqihe Kazemi, Qasim son of Muhammad Jawad.
- Explanations of Istibsar by Allamah Sayyid Muhsin ibn Hasan A'arji Kazemi (d.1127 AH).

== See also ==
- Tafsir (commentaries on the Quran)
- List of Biblical commentaries
- Jewish commentaries on the Bible
