= Habibur Rahman Azami =

Hadith scholar (1901–1992)

Muhaddith Habibur Rahman Azami
- Title: "The Greatest Scholar of The Islamic World"

Personal life
- Born: 1900 Mau, Uttar Pradesh, India
- Died: 1992 (aged 90–91) Mau, Uttar Pradesh, India
- Notable work(s): Nusrat al-hadith, Insab wa kifa'at ki sharai haisiyat,Tahqeeq e Ahle Hadith, Rakat e Traweeh, Ta'deel Rajjal e Bukhari, Beema aur uski Shara i Ahmiyat, Husn e Adab aur uski Ahmiyat, Sir Syed Ahmed Khan Ka Nazariya Hujjiyat e Hadees, Maqalat e Abul Maasir.
- Education: Darul Uloom Mau, Darul Uloom Deoband
- Pen name: Abul Ma'sir

Religious life
- Religion: Islam
- Movement: Deobandi
- Profession: Muhaddith Faqih

Muslim leader
- Students: Sheikh Muhammad Awwamah, Zafeeruddin Miftahi, Abd al-Fattah Abu Ghudda, Sa'id al-Afghani, Nizamuddin Asir Adrawi, Habibur Rahman Azami, Abul Qasim Nomani

Habibur Rahman Azami was an Indian Islamic scholar and a researcher of Hadith. His works include the restoration of Musannaf of Abd al-Razzaq.

== Early life ==
A'zami was born in Maunath Bhanjan , Mau district (Uttar Pradesh), India. He completed his formal education in Mau in 1922 Darul Uloom Mau and began teaching. He is known for his scholarly work on Hadith and Fiqh.

== Services ==
A'zami's works are divided in three categories comprising Editing of Hadith manuscripts, his own original works, and those related to Polemic. He helped to bring the Musannaf of Abd al-Razzaq al-San'ani back to attention within the Muslim world. His works include:

- Kitab al-Zuhd wa al-Raqaiq of ‘Abd-Allah ibn Mubarak (d.181 A.H.)
- Sunan of Sa’id ibn Mansur (d. 227 A.H.)
- Musnad of Imam Humaydi (d. 219 A.H.)
- Musannaf of ‘Abd al-Razzaq (d. 211 A.H.)
- Musannaf of Ibn Abi Shaybah (d. 235 A.H.)
- al-Matalib al’Aliyah of Ibn Hajar Al-‘Asqalani (d.752 A.H.)
- Majma ‘Bihar-al-Anwar of Tahir Patni (d. 986 A.H.)
- al-Targhib wat-Tarhib by Mundhiri (d. 656 A.H.)
- Raka’at al-Tarawih, A’lam Marfu’ah and Shari’ Haqiqi.
- A’yan al-Hujjaj in two volumes, provides crisp and insightful accounts of scholar-pilgrims.
- Dastakar Ahl-i Sharaf (published in 1406 A.H.) deals with the biographies of men of eminence distinction who were weavers by profession.

== Legacy ==
Although various research scholars have made Habib al-Rahman the title of their thesis, one thesis of M.Phil. standard has been written about him. Masood Ahmad Azmi wrote ‘‘Hayat abul Ma'asir Allama Habib al-Rahman al-Azmi (حیات ابو المآثر علامہ حبیب الرحمن الاعظمی)’’ in two volumes. It has been published by Madrassa Mirqatul Uloom, Mau. It is over and about 1500 pages and discusses various aspects of the life of Maulana Azmi. Abdel-Halim Mahmoud gave him the title of "The Greatest Scholar of The Islamic World" ("اکبر علماء العالم الاسلامی").

6-7 July 2019: Institute of Objective Studies' two-day national conference on the life and contributions of Allama Habib al-Rahman al-A'zami in the Speaker Hall, Constitution Club of India, New Delhi.

== See also ==
- List of Deobandis
