= Habibur Rahman Azami (disambiguation) =

Habibur Rahman Azami may refer to:

- Habibur Rahman Azami (1900 – 1992), known for Musannaf Abd al-Razzaq restoration
- Habibur Rahman Azami (scholar, born 1941), editor-in-chief of Monthly Darul Uloom
