= Fayd al-Qadir =

16th-century commentary on al-Jāmiʿ al-Ṣaghīr'

- Author: Al-Munawi
- Original title: فيض القدير
- Language: Arabic (originally)
- Subject: Al-Jami' al-Saghir
- Genre: Sharh
- Publisher: Dar al-Usul al-Ilmiyya
- Publication place: Istanbul, Turkey

Fayd al-Qadir Sharh al-Jami al-Saghir (Arabic: فيض القدير شرح الجامع الصغير, lit. 'The Bountiful Outpouring: Commentary on al-Jāmiʿ al-Ṣaghīr') is a multi-volume commentary on al-Jāmiʿ al-Ṣaghīr, a collection of hadith compiled by Jalāl al-Dīn al-Suyūṭī. Authored by ʿAbd al-Raʾūf al-Munāwī (d. 1622), the work is regarded as his most renowned contribution to hadith scholarship. It provides an exhaustive explanation of al-Suyūṭī's compilation and remains widely studied among Sunni scholars and students.

== Methodology ==
Al-Suyūṭī compiled al-Jāmiʿ al-Ṣaghīr by selecting concise prophetic traditions (ahadiths) and arranging them alphabetically. In Fayḍ al-Qadīr, al-Munāwī followed the same organizational structure while providing detailed explanations of each hadith. His commentary is primarily characterized by takhrīj (citation tracing), through which he identified the sources of the hadiths, discussed their chains of transmission, and offered remarks on the narrators. In his interpretive sections, al-Munāwī frequently cited earlier scholars, supplementing their assessments with his own observations where necessary.

An analysis of Fayḍ al-Qadīr indicates that al-Munāwī paid close attention to lexical and grammatical analysis, clarified meanings in both linguistic and customary contexts, and addressed the legal implications derived from the hadiths. He notes textual variants, omissions, and additions, thereby providing a comprehensive and critical exposition of the material. The author also emphasizes the extraction of theological insights, providing guidance on matters of ʿaqīdah.

The manuscripts utilized by al-Munāwī in composing Fayḍ al-Qadīr can be identified based on the information he records within the work. He occasionally employed multiple copies of the same text and referred to manuscripts of other hadith compilations. These included original drafts, authorial copies, and later derivatives. Several of the manuscripts cited by al-Munāwī hold particular importance, as some of them are no longer extant. Evidence within Fayḍ al-Qadīr suggests that al-Munāwī had access to both the original and various derivative copies of al-Jāmiʿ al-Ṣaghīr, though the fate of the author's original manuscript remains unknown.

== Features ==
Fayḍ al-Qadīr is a detailed and comprehensive commentary on Imām al-Suyūṭī's al-Jāmiʿ al-Ṣaghīr, in which al-Munāwī provides an extensive exposition of the text. The work demonstrates his expertise in ḥadīth science and his proficiency in jurisprudence and legal interpretation. A close examination of the commentary reveals several key features that characterize al-Munāwī's methodological approach:

1. The author employs an integrative style, blending the original text seamlessly into his commentary.
2. Throughout his explanation, he includes useful notes, remarks, poetic quotations, and proverbial sayings.
3. He follows the wording of each ḥadīth text closely, explaining it concisely, though this sometimes leads to lengthiness — for which he often apologizes.
4. When interpreting ḥadīths related to legal rulings, he outlines points of juristic disagreement and cites evidences but refrains from excessive detail, explaining that full discussions belong to the books of furūʿ (subsidiary jurisprudence).
5. He reconciles ḥadīths that appear contradictory and explains one ḥadīth in light of another.
6. He provides brief biographical notes about the narrators and compilers of the ḥadīths, sometimes noting subtleties in their chains of transmission.
7. He identifies textual corruptions found in some manuscripts of al-Jāmiʿ al-Ṣaghīr, correcting them by reference to an autograph copy written by al-Suyūṭī himself, and notes that any variations contrary to it have no basis or authenticity.

== Al-Munawi's judgments on the Hadiths of al-Jami al-Saghir ==
Al-Manāwī comments on the ḥadīths cited by al-Suyūṭī in al-Jāmiʿ al-Ṣaghīr, passing his own judgments on them in accordance with what he believes correct, usually supporting his assessment with references to scholars of the ḥadīth discipline. His evaluations can be summarized as follows:

- Disagreement over authenticity: He disagrees with al-Suyūṭī's grading of certain ḥadīths as authentic. For example, regarding the ḥadīth “Gabriel came to me at the beginning of revelation and taught me ablution and prayer”, al-Manāwī writes: “The author marked it as authentic, but this is incorrect. Ibn al-Jawzī listed it in al-ʿIlal via two chains from Usāmah from his father, one through Ibn Lahīʿah and the other through Rushdīn — both weak. Al-Dāraqutnī also declared it weak for this reason. However, as some scholars noted, it is strengthened by a narration in Ibn Mājah conveying the same meaning, and similar reports exist from al-Barāʾ and Ibn ʿAbbās — though not concerning the prayer part.”
- Disagreement over grading as fair (ḥasan): For example, concerning the ḥadīth “Gabriel came to me and said: When you perform ablution, run your fingers through your beard,” al-Manāwī says: “He (al-Suyūṭī) marked it as fair (ḥasan), and this is an error. Ibn Ḥajar, after citing it from Ibn Abī Shaybah, Ibn Mājah, and Ibn al ʿAdī, stated that its chain is very weak.”
- Disagreement over limiting the judgment: At times al-Manāwī believes al-Suyūṭī underrated or overrated a ḥadīth. For instance, regarding the ḥadīth “An angel came to me with a message from God, the Exalted,” al-Manāwī says: “The author marked it as weak, which is an understatement; it deserves to be marked as fair. Although the chain includes Ṣadaqah ibn ʿAbd Allāh al-Dimashqī, whom many weakened, Ibn Maʿīn and Duhīm — among others — deemed him trustworthy. It is thus better than many ḥadīths al-Suyūṭī graded as fair.”
- Identification of fabricated ḥadīths: Al-Manāwī points out fabricated reports that al-Suyūṭī included in al-Jāmiʿ al-Ṣaghīr without comment, even though al-Suyūṭī stated in his introduction that he had excluded any ḥadīth transmitted only by known liars or fabricators. Al-Manāwī exposes these spurious reports which al-Suyūṭī either overlooked or failed to label as fabricated — even though al-Suyūṭī himself declared some of them fabricated in other works. Some scholars explained this by suggesting either that al-Suyūṭī later revised his judgment or simply overlooked it due to forgetfulness.
- At times, al-Manāwī himself judges a ḥadīth to be fabricated, citing authoritative statements to support his view — for example, concerning the ḥadīth “A good intention leads its possessor to Paradise.” He writes: “It contains ʿAbd al-Raḥīm al-Fārābī, whom al-Dhahabī listed among the weak and accused of fabrication, and Ismāʿīl ibn Yaḥyā ibn ʿUbayd Allāh, whom al-Dhahabī called a notorious liar.”
- Explaining al-Suyūṭī's reasoning: In some cases, al-Manāwī clarifies al-Suyūṭī's purpose in grading a ḥadīth. For example, regarding the ḥadīth “The last words spoken by Abraham when he was thrown into the fire were: ‘God is sufficient for me, and He is the best disposer of affairs,’” al-Suyūṭī marked it as gharīb (rare) from al-Khaṭīb's narration from Abū Hurayrah, adding that the sound version is a mawqūf report from Ibn ʿAbbās. Al-Manāwī explains: “His term gharīb means that it was transmitted by a single reliable narrator. It was also narrated by al-Daylamī in the same way. His statement ‘the sound version is mawqūf from Ibn ʿAbbās’ means that according to hadith scholars, it is authentically reported from Ibn ʿAbbās as his own statement, not as a Prophetic one — but since such words could not have been said by mere opinion, it holds the same ruling as a Prophetic ḥadīth. This mawqūf version is sound, for al-Bukhārī recorded it in his Ṣaḥīḥ with the wording: ‘The last words of Abraham when he was thrown into the fire were…’.”

== Abridgement ==
Al-Munāwī later authored another commentary on al-Jāmiʿ al-Ṣaghīr, entitled al-Taysīr bi-Sharḥ al-Jāmiʿ al-Ṣaghīr. He stated that some envious contemporaries sought to produce a work comparable to his earlier commentary, Fayḍ al-Qadīr. Upon failing to do so, they began to criticize Fayḍ al-Qadīr for being overly lengthy and filled with excessive discussion. In response to such criticisms, some individuals requested that al-Munāwī prepare an abridged version of Fayḍ al-Qadīr. Concerned, however, that an abridgment would result in the loss of numerous valuable insights contained in the original, he instead composed a separate commentary, al-Taysīr.

== Influence ==
Al-Munāwī's works were widely read and valued for their scholarly depth and utility. Some of his writings became standard reference sources for later scholars. Among the most significant of these are his commentaries on al-Suyūṭī's al-Jāmiʿ al-Ṣaghīr were Fayḍ al-Qadīr and al-Taysīr. These two works are regarded as foundational for understanding al-Suyūṭī's compilation and served as important references for subsequent commentators. Several later works on al-Jāmiʿ al-Ṣaghīr were composed with substantial reliance on al-Munāwī's analyses, evaluation, and interpretations.

== See also ==
- List of Sunni books
- List of hadith books
