= Ibn Khuzayma =

9th and 10th-century Sunni scholar

Abu Bakr Muhammad ibn Ishaq ibn Khuzaymah al-Nishapuri

Personal life
- Born: Safar 223 AH/January 838 Nishapur
- Died: Dhu al-Qa'dah 311/February 924
- Children: Abu al-Nasr
- Region: Khurasan
- Main interest(s): Hadith; Fiqh Aqidah
- Notable work: Sahih Ibn Khuzaymah

Religious life
- Religion: Islam
- Denomination: Sunni
- Jurisprudence: Shafi'i

Abu Bakr Muhammad ibn Ishaq ibn Khuzaymah al-Nishapuri (Arabic:محمد بن إسحق بن خزيمة النيسابوري) (Persian: محمد بن اسحاق بن خزیمه نیشاپوری) (born 838 CE (223 AH); died 924 CE (311 AH)) was a prominent Persian Muslim muhaddith scholar and Shafi'i jurist. He is best known for his hadith collection, Sahih Ibn Khuzaymah.

== Biography ==
He was born in Nishapur a year earlier than Ibn Jarir al-Tabari and outlived him by one year. In Nishapur, he studied under its scholars, including Ishaq Ibn Rahwayh (died 238 AH/853 CE), the muhaddith of Khorasan at the time, as well as with al-Bukhari and Muslim.

== Works ==
Al-Hakim recorded that Ibn Khuzaymah wrote more than 140 books. Little of what he wrote survives today:

- Saheeh ibn Khuzaymah: mukhtaṣar al-Mukhtaṣar min al-musnad al-Ṣaḥīḥ (Arabic: صحيح بن خزيمة : مختصر المختصر من المسند الصحيح): It is a collection of hadiths, covering prayer, fasting, pilgrimage, and the zakāt tithe. Among the Sahih collections after Sahih Bukhari and Sahih Muslim, it is regarded highly along with Sahih Ibn Hibbaan and Sahih Abi 'Awana. It has been edited by Muhammad Mustafa Al-A'zami and published by al-Maktab al-Islami in Beirut.
- Kitāb al-Tawḥīd wa-ithbāt ṣifāt al-Rabb ’azza wa-jall (Arabic: کتاب التوحيد وإثبات صفات الرب عز وجل, lit. 'The Book of the Affirmation of Divine Unity and the Affirmation of the Attributes of the Lord') – OCLC 54295822, 499842253 Recently, an English translation of the work has been initiated which is being publish piecemeal on https://kitabaltawhidenglish.blogspot.com/.
- Sha’n al-du‘ā’ wa-tafsīr al-ad‘īyah al-ma’thūrah (Arabic: شأن الدعاء وتفسير الأدعية المأثورة)
- Fawāʼid al-Fawāʼid (Arabic: فوائد الفوائد لابن خزيمة)

== See also ==
- Asas al-Taqdis
