= Fath al-Bari =

15th-century commentary on Sahih al-Bukhari

Fatḥ al-Bārī
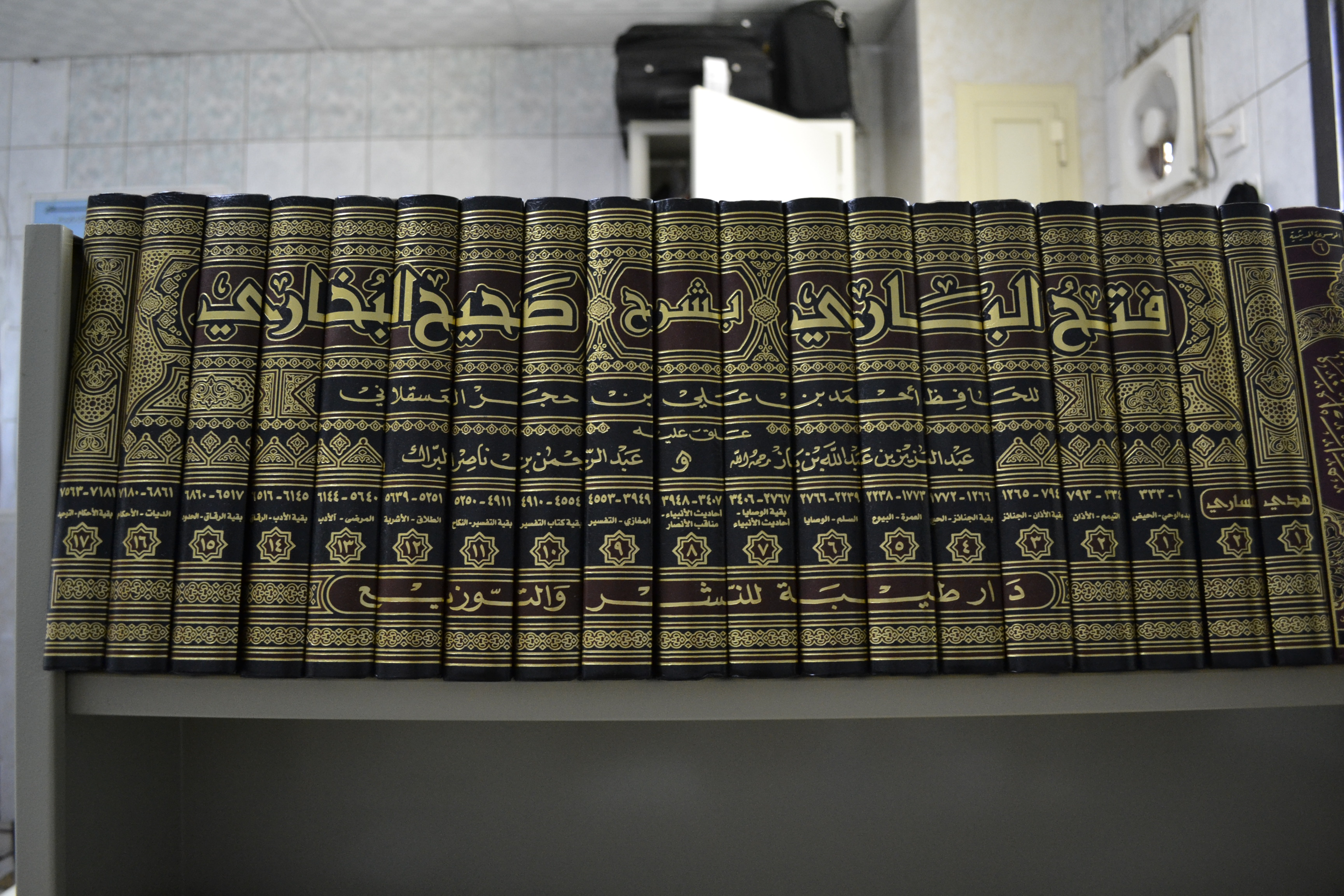
- Complete volume of Fath al-Bari
- Author: Ibn Hajar al-'Asqalani
- Original title: فتح الباري
- Language: Arabic (originally)
- Subject: Hadith, Aqidah, Fiqih
- Genre: Sharh
- Publication date: 15th century
- Publication place: Egypt

Fath al-Bari (Arabic: فتح الباري, romanized: Fatḥ al-Bārī, lit. 'Grant of the Creator') is a commentary on Sahih al-Bukhari, the first of the Six Books of Sunni Islam, authored by Egyptian Islamic scholar Ibn Hajar al-Asqalani. Considered his magnum opus, it is a widely celebrated hadith commentary.

== Reception ==
Abd al-Hayy ibn Abd al-Kabir al-Kattani said: “When the author of al-Hittah quoted Ibn Khaldun as saying that the explanation of Sahih al-Bukhari is a debt upon the Muslim nation, he said, ‘This debt has been fulfilled by the explanation of al-Hafith Ibn Hajar.’ For that reason, when it was suggested to Muhammad ibn ‘Ali al-Shawkani, that he write an explanation of al-Jami’ al-Sahih by al-Bukhari just as others have, he responded, ‘There is no migration after al-Fath,’ referring to Fath al-Bari".

Abd al-Hakim Murad said of Fath al-Bari in the introduction to the translation of Ibn Hajar al-Asqalani's commentary on selected hadith (published as a booklet by the Muslim Academic Trust): "The importance of this literature may be gauged by the fact that at least seventy full commentaries have been written on Imam al-Bukhari’s great Sahih... the most celebrated [of which] is without question the magnificent Fath al-Bari (Victory of the Creator) by Imam Ibn Hajar al-‘Asqalani, a work which was the crown both of its genre and of the Imam’s academic career. It is appreciated by the ulema for the doctrinal soundness of its author, for its complete coverage of Bukhari’s material, its mastery of the relevant Arabic sciences, the wisdom it shows in drawing lessons (fawa’id) from the hadiths it expounds, and its skill in resolving complex disputes over variant readings."

Islamicist Norman Calder described Ibn Hajar's work as "the most magnificent achievement of exegetical discourse".

== Editions ==
Editions include one from the Egyptian Press of Mustafa Al-Babi Al-Halabi, 1959 (1378 A.H.).
