= Salman Bijnori =

Indian Islamic scholar, teacher and editor

Maulana Muhammad Salman Bijnori مولانا محمد سلمان بجنوری
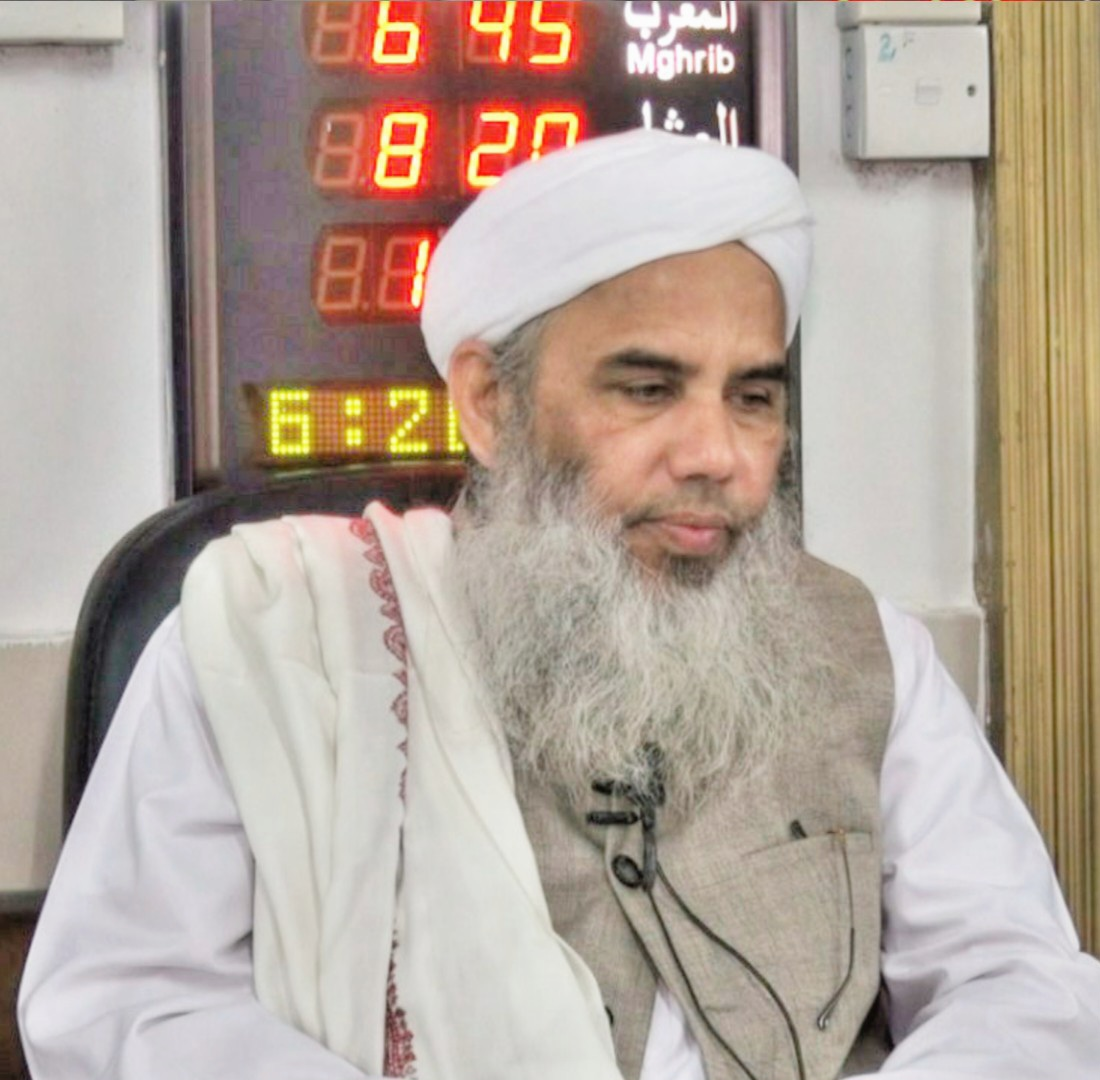

Vice-President of Jamiat Ulama-e-Hind (M)
- Incumbent
- Assumed office May 2022

Editor-in-chief of Monthly Darul Uloom
- Incumbent
- Assumed office December 2016
- Preceded by: Habibur Rahman Azami

Personal details
- Profession: Teacher of Darul Uloom Deoband

Personal life
- Born: Muhammad Salman; 14 April 1969 (age 57) Sahaspur, Bijnor district, Uttar Pradesh, India
- Education: Jamia Ashraful Uloom Rashīdi, Gangoh; Darul Uloom Deoband
- Occupation: Islamic scholar, teacher, writer, Sufi spiritual guide

Religious life
- Religion: Islam
- Denomination: Sunni
- Jurisprudence: Hanafi
- Tariqa: Naqshbandi
- Creed: Maturidi
- Movement: Deobandi

Muslim leader
- Teacher: Naseer Ahmad Khan; Abdul Haq Azmi; Nematullah Azmi; Qamruddin Ahmad Gorakhpuri; Saeed Ahmad Palanpuri; Arshad Madani; Muhammad Hussain Bihari; Riyasat Ali Zafar Bijnori; Zubair Ahmad Deobandi
- Disciple of: Zulfiqar Ahmad Naqshbandi

YouTube information
- Channel: Salman Bijnori
- Years active: 2019–present
- Genre: Islamic
- Subscribers: 42.7 thousand
- Views: 2.88 million
- Last updated: 1 January 2026

Salman Bijnori (born 14 April 1969), also known as Maulana Salman Bijnori, is an Indian Islamic scholar, senior teacher at Darul Uloom Deoband, and editor-in-chief of its monthly journal Darul Uloom. Affiliated with the Naqshbandi Sufi order, he is an authorised disciple of Zulfiqar Ahmad Naqshbandi. He also serves as the Vice President of Jamiat Ulama-e-Hind (M).

== Early life and education ==
Salman Bijnori was born on 14 April 1969 in Sahaspur, Bijnor district, Uttar Pradesh, into a family of scholars. His father, Saeed Ahmad Qasmi Sahaspuri, was a graduate of Darul Uloom Deoband and a student of Hussain Ahmad Madani.

He memorized the Quran at the age of seven under his father’s guidance and completed foundational Arabic and Islamic studies at home. In 1981, he enrolled at Jamia Ashraf-ul-Uloom, Gangoh, where he studied until his graduation in 1987. He then enrolled at Darul Uloom Deoband in 1987 and completed the Dawra-e-Hadith in 1988. His teachers at Darul Uloom Deoband included Naseer Ahmad Khan, Abdul Haq Azmi, Nematullah Azmi, Qamruddin Ahmad Gorakhpuri, Saeed Ahmad Palanpuri, Muhammad Hussain Bihari, Arshad Madani, Riyasat Ali Zafar Bijnori, and Zubair Ahmad Deobandi.

Following his graduation, he pursued a specialization in Arabic literature ('Takmil al-Adab al-Arabi') at Darul Uloom Deoband, where he studied under Wahiduzzaman Kairanawi, Usman Mansoorpuri, and Noor Alam Khalil Amini, earning first position in his exams.

== Career ==
After completing his education, Bijnori was appointed as an assistant teacher at Darul Uloom Deoband in Dhu al-Qadah 1409 AH (June 1989). He served in this capacity for two years before moving to Madrasa Faiz-e-Hidayat Rahimi in Raipur, Saharanpur district, where he taught for a year from Shawwal 1411 AH (April 1991) to Sha'ban 1412 AH (February 1992). He later taught at Madrasa Shahi in Moradabad in the Arabic language and literature department from Shawwal 1412 AH to Sha'ban 1414 AH (April 1992 to January 1994). During this time, he also supervised the biweekly wall magazine Al-Balagh, published by the department's students.

In 1994 (1414 AH), he was appointed as a permanent faculty member at Darul Uloom Deoband. Later, in 2019 (1440 AH), he was promoted to the position of senior faculty member in the institution. Currently, he teaches advanced Islamic texts such as Sunan Ibn Mājah, Mishkat al-Masabih, Diwan al-Hamasa, and Sab'a Mu'allaqat.

Since 2016, he has served as the editor-in-chief of Darul Uloom, the official Urdu monthly journal of Darul Uloom Deoband, succeeding Habibur Rahman Azami.

In 2022, he was elected Vice President of Jamiat Ulama-e-Hind (M), where he contributes to the organization’s socio-religious initiatives.

He is an authorized disciple of Zulfiqar Ahmad Naqshbandi in the Naqshbandi Sufi order.

== Political views ==
Bijnori expressed his views on the role of madrasas, stating that the purpose of madrasas is to train scholars, not to produce doctors or engineers. He urged the government to support Muslim schools that provide non-religious education but refrain from interfering with the traditional role of madrasas. He also opposed the chanting of "Vande Mataram," stating that while Islam teaches Muslims to love their homeland, it does not permit the worship of any country.

== See also ==
- List of Deobandis
- Salman Mansoorpuri
