= Muhammad ibn Abi Muhammad al-Ansari =

Muḥammad ibn Abī Muḥammad al-Anṣārī (Arabic: محمد بن أبي محمد الأنصاري) was a freed slave of Zayd ibn Thabit, a companion of the Islamic Prophet Muhammad. He is known as a Hadith narrator. However, he is considered Majhul (unknown) by most scholars.

== Biography ==
Little is known about Muhammad ibn Abi Muhammad. It is known that he was a freed slave of Zayd ibn Thabit, a famous companion of the Prophet Muhammad. He is known as a Hadith narrator, but only Ibn Ishaq is known to have narrated from him. (Note: • د - محمد بن أبي محمد الأنصاري، مولى زيد بن ثابت مدني. Muhammad ibn Abi Muhammad al-Ansari, the client of Zayd ibn Thabit al-Madani محمد بن أبي محمد مولى زيد بن ثابت Muhammad ibn Abi Muhammad, the client of Zayd ibn Thabit)

He is not to be confused with Muhammad ibn Ka'b al-Qurazi, who is sometimes also called Muhammad ibn Abi Muhammad al-Madani. (Note: تمييز محمد بن أبي محمد "Differentiation from Muhammad ibn Abi Muhammad")

== Ruling ==
The general ruling on Muhammad is that he is Majhul, meaning unknown.

- Al-Dhahabi: Unknown (Majhul) (Note: ٣٥٣٩ — محمد بن أبي محمد عن عوف بن مالك: مجهول "3959 — Muhammad ibn Abi Muhammad, who narrates from Awf ibn Malik; He is unknown")
- Ibn Hajar al-Asqalani: Unknown (Majhul) (Note: قلت: وقال الذهبي: لا يعرف. "I (Ibn Hajar) and al-Dhahabi say: Unknown")
- Ibn Hibban: Trustworthy (Thiqah) (Note: ذكره ابن حبان في الثقات "Ibn Hibban mentions him among the trustworthy")
  However, Ibn Hibban considered all narrators that are unknown to be trustworthy, as long as a trustworthy person narrates from him. (Note: وقد أشار إلى هذه الحقيقة ابن حبان نفسه؛ حيث قال في بعض"ضعفائه"(١/ ٣٢٧ - ٣٢٨):"والشيخ إذا لم يرو عنه ثقة؛ فهو مجهول، لا يجوز الاحتجاج به، لأن رواية الضعيف لا تخرج من ليس بعدل عن حد المجهولين إلى جملة أهل العدالة؛ لأن ما روى الضعيف وما لم يرو في الحكم سواء"(٢).ونحوه قوله فيه(٢/ ١٩٣)."وأما المجاهيل الذين لم يرو عنهم إلا الضعفاء؛ فهم متروكون على الأحوال كلها". Ibn Hibban himself pointed to this fact; where he said in some of his "Duafaa" (1/327–328): "And if a shaykh is not narrated from by a trustworthy person, then he is unknown, and it is not permissible to use him as proof, because the narration of the weak does not move one who is not upright from the category of the unknowns into the group of the people of uprightness; for what a weak narrator transmits and what he does not transmit are equal in ruling." And similar is his statement in it (2/193): "As for the unknowns whom only the weak have narrated from, they are abandoned in every case.")

== List of narrated Hadith ==
Many of Muhammad's narrations can be found in Ibn Ishaqs Sirat Rasul Allah. Among others, some Hadith narrated by Muhammad ibn Abi Muhammad are:

- Narrated by Ibn Abbas:

When the Apostle of Allah had victory over Quraish in the Battle of Badr and came to Medina he gathered the Jews in the market of Banu Qainuqa and said “O community of Jews embrace Islam before you suffer an injury as the Quraish suffered.” They said “Muhammad, you should not deceive yourself (taking pride) that you had killed a few persons of the Quariash who were inexperienced and did not know how to fight. Had you fought with us, you would have known us. You have never met people like us.” Allah Most High revealed about this the following verse: “Say to those who reject faith, soon will ye be vanished... one army was fighting in the cause of Allah, the other resisting Allah". (Note: Q. Surat Ali Imran 3:12–13; This narration is mentioned in the following works: Ibn Ishaq (1967). سيرة رسول الله [The Life of Muhammad]. p. 363.; Sunan Abi Dawud 3001)

- Narrated by Ibn Abbas:

Salam bin Mishkam, Nuaman bin Awfa, Shas bin Qays, and Malik bin al-Sayf came to the Messenger of Allah, peace and blessings be upon him, and said: "How can we follow you, when you have abandoned our qiblah, and you do not claim that Uzair is the son of Allah?” So Allah revealed about their statement: "The Jews said that Uzair is the son of Allah and the Christians said that the Messiah is the son of Allah" up to: "How are they deluded?" (Note: Quran Surat al-Tawbah 9:30; The Hadith is mentioned by Al-Tabari in his Tafsir on 9:30 of the Quran (Surat al-Tawbah))

Both of these Hadith have the following chain:
Ibn Abbas → Sa'id ibn Jubayr (or Ikrimah al-Barbari) → Muhammad ibn Abi Muhammad → Ibn Ishaq.

== Sources ==
=== Bibliography ===
- Q. Surat Al Imran 3:12–13
- Sunan Abi Dawud 3001
- Q. Surat al-Tawbah 9:30
- Tafsir al-Tabari on Q. 9:30 (in Arabic)
- Ibn Ishaq (1967). سيرة رسول الله [The Life of Muhammad]. Karachi: Oxford University Press. p. 363.
- Ibn Hajar al-Asqalani (2014). تهذيب التهذيب [Refinement of the refinement] (in Arabic). Vol. 3. Beirut: مؤسسة الرسالة. p. 690.
- Al-Shatibi (1997). الموافقات [The Agreements] (in Arabic). Vol. 6. دار ابن عفان. p. 345.
- Al-Dhahabi (1967). ديوان الضعفاء والمتروكين [Collection of weak and abandoned narrators] (in Arabic). Mecca: مكتبة النهضة الحديثة. p. 373.
- Al-Albani (2002). صحيح موارد الظمآن إلى زوائد ابن حبان [The Authentic Sources of the Thirsty: Additions to Ibn Hibban] (in Arabic). Vol. 1. Riyadh: دار الصميعي للنشر والتوزيع. p. 24.
