= Ma'mar ibn Rashid =

8th-century Persian Hadith scholar

- معمر بن راشد

Personal life
- Born: 95 AH/713 CE Basra, Umayyad Caliphate
- Died: 153 AH/770 CE Sanaa, Abbasid Caliphate
- Era: Islamic golden age
- Main interest(s): Hadith, Prophetic biography
- Notable work: The Book of Expeditions

Religious life
- Religion: Islam

Muslim leader
- Students: ʽAbd al-Razzaq al-Sanʽani, Hisham ibn Yusuf al-Sanʽani
- Influenced by: Ibn Shihab al-Zuhri, Hasan al-Basri, Qatada ibn Di'amah

Ma'mar ibn Rashid (Arabic: معمر بن راشد, romanized: Maʿmar ibn Rāshid) was an eighth-century hadith scholar. A Persian mawla ("freedman"), he is cited as an authority in all six of the canonical Sunni hadith collections. He was a student of and is considered one of the most important sources for Ibn Shihab al-Zuhri.

Ma'mar is the author of the Kitāb al-Maghāzi (The Expeditions), one of the earliest surviving prophetic biographies in Islamic literature, alongside that of Ibn Ishaq. Ma'mar's work survives through a recension produced by his student, Abd al-Razzaq (d. 211/827). In 2015, an English translation of it was published by Sean Anthony.

Ma'mar also wrote the al-Jāmiʿ, which has also come down through the transmission of Abd al-Razzaq, as an appendix of his Musannaf. This was one of the earliest, if not the earliest, thematic compilation of hadith about Muhammad. One chapter of it is the earliest known systematic exposition of what was to become the dalāʾil al-nubūwa ("proofs of prophethood") literature.

== Life ==
Ma'mar ibn Rashid was born in 96 AH/714 CE in Basra. He was a Persian mawla ("freedman") of the Huddan clan of Azd, trading cloth and other luxuries on their behalf. Despite this, he was able to study under the Basran scholars Hasan al-Basri and Qatada ibn Di'ama.

While on a journey to trade wares at Hisham ibn Abd al-Malik's court in Resafa, he encountered and became pupil to the elderly scholar Ibn Shihab al-Zuhri. Ma'mar learned and transmitted a large body of traditions from al-Zuhri through audition, public recitation and writing, making his narrations coveted by other hadith scholars.

Ma'mar remained in Resafa after al-Zuhri's death, and witnessed the removal of his late teacher's manuscripts from the Umayyad court following the assassination of al-Walid II. Amid the turbulence of the civil wars that followed, Ma'mar departed for Yemen where he spent the last twenty years of his life. There he married a local woman and taught several students, transmitting hadith to many individuals that would become major scholars. The most prominent of these was ʽAbd al-Razzaq al-Sanʽani, who he taught for the final seven to eight years of his life. ʽAbd al-Razzaq preserved Ma'mar's traditions in his own musannaf, notably arranging those concerning Muhammad's life into The Book of Expeditions (Arabic: كتاب المغازي, romanized: Kitāb al-Maghāzī), which has survived as one of the earliest extant works of sira-maghazi literature. Also preserved is ʽAbd al-Razzaq's recension of Ma'mar's hadith collection, al-Jāmi'.

== Works ==
=== Kitab al-Maghāzi ===
Ma'mar's Kitab al-Maghazi (Military Expeditions) belongs to a subgenre of prophetic biography that focuses on the military raids conducted during the lifetime of Muhammad. Specifically, it focuses on the key battles and raids, as well as their location, conducted under the rule of Muhammad. In tradition, the material originates from the lectures of Ibn Shihab al-Zuhri as presented to his student, Ma'mar. Ma'mar, in turn, transmitted his version of these stories and lectures to his own pupil, Abd al-Razzaq, through whom the extant version of the text was written down and is known. Therefore, Ma'mar is not the author of the Kitab al-Maghazi in a conventional sense of authorship, but is labelled as such by historian Sean Anthony, who believes that he was the pivotal figure for the arrangement of the form and content of the text that has reached us today. This situation is not unusual, as all Arabic historical writings of the second Islamic century only survive through the recensions of later authors. The Kitab al-Maghazi is not chronologically ordered, although material is arranged under some chapter headings. There is thematic overlap between some of the chapters, but this was for the purpose of dividing material Ma'mar obtained from al-Zuhri, and from figures other than al-Zuhri.

=== Al-Jamiʿ ===
The al-Jāmiʿ of Ma'mar is one of the earliest thematic compilations of hadith. It has come down through a recension produced by Ma'mar's foremost student, Abd al-Razzaq, specifically as an appendix to another one of his works, the Musannaf. One chapter of the Jāmiʿ called the “Bāb al-nubūwa” is the earliest known collection of reports concerned with offering proofs for the prophetic status of Muhammad. It is not known the degree to which Ma'mar himself, or his student Abd al-Razzaq, shaped the extant form of this chapter. The chapter contains six reports. (Later works in this genre would contain a massively expanded list of such reports.) The first four concerned miraculous acts of creating water in times of need. The first two are the same story, though with a different isnad each. The story is that one of Muhammad's Companions was looking for water to perform an ablution. Muhammad put his hand on a vessel with only a little water in it, and water gushed forth between his fingers, enough for seventy people. In a third report, a woman is asked to provide water from her water skins into a vessel. After a series of water transfers, the women notices that her original water skin was bulkier than before, and Muhammad declared that God had miraculously provided. This was followed by the conversion of the women, who also converts her kinsmen on account of this episode. In a fourth account, a man is asked to pass around his bowl of water for seventy-two men to perform water ablutions. After it returns to the original man, it turns out that the water level of the bowl was unchanged. In a fifth account, Abd Allah ibn Jahsh tells Muhammad, during the Battle of Uhud, that he had lost his sword. Muhammad gives the man a branch from a tree, and the branch miraculously transforms into a new sword. In the sixth account, a Companion of Muhammad reports having seen a special sign (ʿalāma) between Muhammad's shoulders that is a special physical marker of a prophet.

== See also ==
- Ibn Jurayj
- Ata ibn Abi Rabah

== Bibliography ==
- Rāshid, Maʿmar ibn, et al. The Expeditions: An Early Biography of Muhammad. Edited by Sean W. Anthony, NYU Press, 2015. ISBN 9781479816828
