= Zulfiqar Ahmad Naqshbandi =

Pakistani Islamic scholar and Sufi (1953–2025)

- ذوالفقار احمد نقشبندی

Emir of Mahad-ul-Faqeer Al-Islami, Jhang
- In office 1988–2025

Personal life
- Born: 1 April 1953 Jhang, Punjab, West Pakistan
- Died: 14 December 2025 (aged 72) Jhang, Punjab, Pakistan
- Main interest: Sufism
- Education: University of Engineering and Technology, Lahore
- Occupation: Sufi, Islamic scholar

Religious life
- Religion: Islam
- Denomination: Sunni
- Jurisprudence: Hanafi
- Tariqa: Naqshbandi
- Movement: Deobandi

Muslim leader
- Disciples: A F M Khalid Hossain, Mufti Muhammad Ayoub Naqshbandi, Sajjad Nomani, Rahmatullah Mir Qasmi, Salman Bijnori, Obaidullah Hamzah

Zulfiqar Ahmad Naqshbandi (Urdu: ذوالفقار احمد نقشبندی; 1 April 1953 – 14 December 2025) was a Pakistani Islamic scholar and a Sufi shaykh of the Naqshbandi mystic order. Naqshbandi was listed among The 500 Most Influential Muslims for 2013–2014.

Naqshbandi was the founder of Mahadul-Faqir Al-Islami, Jhang and was known for his association with the Deobandi school of thought. Naqshbandi delivered religious addresses in Pakistan and abroad, including India, where he spoke at institutions such as Darul Uloom Deoband and Darul Uloom Waqf, Deoband.

He was widely regarded as a credible elder of the Naqshbandi order and maintained theological positions aligned with mainstream Deobandi scholars and was noted for his extensive literary output at a time when Sufi scholarly production was considered to be in decline. He authored over one hundred books on Islamic jurisprudence, spirituality, ethics, and social issues.

Naqshbandi died on 14 December 2025 at the age of 72.

== Biography ==
In 2011, Zulfiqar Ahmad Naqshbandi travelled to India and addressed in few organized programs at Eidgah Bilali Mansab tank and Chanchalguda Junior College in Hyderabad. He also spoke at programs in the Masjid Rasheed of Darul Uloom Deoband and at Darul Uloom Waqf, Deoband.

In December 2018, Zulfiqar Ahmad Naqshbandi said that conspiracies against the belief of Finality of Prophethood are a matter of concern for Muslims. Ahmadis and Qadyanis must be made to follow the law of the country, and they should be removed from the key posts.

A question asked at the Darul Ifta of Darul Uloom Deoband about Naqshbandi's reliability was answered as "Zulfiqar Ahmad Naqshbandi is a credible elderly figure of the Naqshbandi order and follows the same track as of the scholars of Deoband".

Naqshbandi was among the world's The 500 Most Influential Muslims during 2013–2014.

Even though Sufi intellectual output has fallen in modern times, Naqshbandi remained an exception and has published widely.

== Death ==
Zulfiqar Naqshbandi died on the morning of 14 December 2025, at the age of 72.

== Literary works ==
According to Worldcat.org Naqshbandi was the author of 118 books, including:

- Fiqh ke buniyādī uṣūl
- Zād-i ḥaram
- Nurturing the budding rose : a complete guide to the upbringing of children
- K̲h̲avātīn-i Islām ke kārnāme
- Ḥayāʼ aur pākdāminī
- Ahle Dil Kay Tarpa Dainay Walay Waqiat
- Ilm e-Nafe
- Gunahoon Say Toba Kijiyay
- Quran-e-Majeed kay Adbi Israr o-Ramooz
- Tasawwuf wa Sulook
- Hayaat-E-Habib (A biography of Peer Ghulam Habib Nashbandi R.A)
- Ishq-E-Ilahi (Urdu)/ Love for Allah (English)
