= Musannaf Abd al-Razzaq =

Early hadith collection by 'Abd ar-Razzaq as-San'ani

Muṣannaf ʿAbd al-Razzāq al-Sanʿānī
- Author: ʽAbd al-Razzaq al-Sanʽani
- Language: Arabic
- Subjects: Hadith, fiqh, sira
- Genre: Musannaf hadith collection
- Published: 8th century CE
- Original text: Muṣannaf ʿAbd al-Razzāq al-Sanʿānī at Arabic Wikisource

Musannaf Abd al-Razzaq al-Sanʿani (Arabic: مصنف عبد الرزاق الصنعاني, romanized: Muṣannaf ʿAbd al-Razzāq al-Sanʿānī) is an early hadith collection compiled by the Yemeni hadith scholar ʽAbd al-Razzaq al-Sanʽani (744–827). As a collection of the musannaf genre, it contains over 18,000 traditions arranged in topical order.

== History ==
=== Compilation ===
Abd al-Razzaq al-Sanʿani likely compiled the musannaf in the second half of the second Hijri century after studying under Ma'mar ibn Rashid, Ibn Jurayj and Sufyan al-Thawri during their respective visits to Yemen. In a sample of 3,810 traditions analysed by Harald Motzki, the majority were largely transmitted from the three. As these three had compiled their own individual written hadith collections, al-Sanʿani's musannaf is considered to be a collation of older works. There are also relatively small numbers of traditions from Sufyan ibn ʽUyaynah, Abu Hanifa and Malik ibn Anas, among many others.

=== Textual history and reconstruction ===
The musannaf was considered lost until its manuscripts were rediscovered, edited and published by Habib al-Rahman al-'Azmi in 1972. The extant work is compiled from manuscripts hailing from different paths of transmission (riwayāt), although approximately 90% of the material can be traced back to a transmitter named Ishaq ibn Ibrahim al-Dabari. Ishaq likely received the musannaf in written form from his father, a student of Abd al-Razzaq, but ostensibly omitted him from the riwaya as he was awarded an ijazah directly from Abd al-Razzaq after attending his lectures as a child. Abd al-Razzaq included his recension of Ma'mar ibn Rashid's Book of Expeditions (Arabic: كتاب المغازي, romanized: Kitāb al-Maghāzī) in the musannaf, which has been reconstructed using a partial manuscript in Ishaq's riwaya dated to 747.

== Reliability ==
In an article published in the Journal of Near Eastern Studies, Motzki argues that the musannaf is a source of authentic traditions from the first Hijri century, stating that the wholesale rejection of hadith literature "deprives the historical study of early Islam of an important and useful type of source." However, he added that the musannaf "cannot be regarded as completely truthful. This even Muslims themselves did not claim."

== Publications ==
- Rāshid, Maʿmar ibn, et al. The Expeditions: An Early Biography of Muhammad. Edited and translated by Sean Anthony, NYU Press, 2015.
- al-Sanʿānī, ʿAbd al-Razzāq, al-Muṣannaf. Edited by Habib al-Rahman al-'Azmi, Beirut, 1970–1972.

== See also ==
- List of Sunni books
- Kutub al-Sittah
- Musannaf Ibn Abi Shaybah
