= Musnad Abi Ya'la =

Hadith book by Imam Abu Yaʽla al-Mawsili

Musnad Abu Yaʽla
- Author: Abu Yaʽla al-Mawsili
- Original title: مسند أبي يعلى
- Language: Arabic
- Genre: Hadith collection

Musnad Abu Yaʽla, or Musnad Abu Yala (Arabic: مسند أبي يعلى), is a Hadith book, and was written by Imam Abu Yaʽla al-Mawsili (210 – 307 AH).

== Commentaries ==
Among those who have written commentaries on this hadith collection are:

- Musnad Abi Yaʽla (307H) (مسند أبي يعلى الموصلي), Commentary by Saeed bin Muhammad As-Sinari (10 Volumes): Published: Darul Hadith

== Published Editions ==
The book has been published by many publishers across the globe:

- Musnad Abi Ya'la. Edited by Hussein Salim Asad. Damascus: Dar Al-Ma'mun for Heritage, 1st edition, 1404 AH / 1984 CE, 13 volumes.
- Musnad Abi Ya'la al-Mawsili. Accompanied by Rahmat al-Mala al-A'la bi-Takhrij Musnad Abi Ya'la (Verification and Commentary by Sa'id ibn Muhammad al-Sanari). Cairo: Dar al-Hadith, 1st edition, 1434 AH / 2013 CE, 10 volumes.
- Musnad Abī Yaʿlā al-Mawṣilī (al-Musnad al-Ṣaghīr). By Abī Yaʿlā al-Mawṣilī. Cairo: Dār al-Taʾṣīl, 2017, 6 volumes.

== See also ==
- List of Sunni books
- Kutub al-Sittah
- Sahih Muslim
- Sahih al-Tirmidhi
- Sunan Abu Dawood
- Either: Sunan ibn Majah, Muwatta Malik
