= Abu Hatim Muhammad ibn Idris al-Razi =

9th-century Persian hadith scholar

Abū Ḥātim Muḥammad ibn Idrīs ibn al-Mundhir al-Rāzī

Personal life
- Born: 811 C.E/ 195 A.H Ray, Iran
- Died: 890 C.E/ 277 A.H
- Occupation: Muhaddith

Religious life
- Religion: Islam
- Denomination: Sunni
- Creed: Athari

Abu Hatim Muhammad ibn Idris al-Razi (811–890) was a notable hadith scholar and Athari theologian born in Ray. He was the father of Ibn Abi Hatim.

== Life ==
His full name was Abū Ḥātim Muḥammad ibn Idrīs ibn al-Mundhir ibn Dāwūd ibn Mihrān al-Rāzī al-Ḥanẓalī al-Ghaṭafānī. Some sources suggest that he was originally from Isfahan and was a mawla of the Ghatafan tribe. Other sources suggest that he acquired his nisba from a street of Ray called "Darb Ḥanẓalah". He died in the month of Sha’bân in the year 277H/890 CE.

== Abū Ḥātim's teachers of Hadith ==
The better known narrators Abū Ḥātim narrated from:

- He narrated from many, such that al-Khalili said, “Abu Hatim al-Labban al-Ḥāfiẓ said to me, ‘I had gathered [those] who Abu Hatim ar-Razi narrated from; they reached close to 3,000.’”

The better known of these were:

- Abū Nuʿaym al-Faḍl ibn Dukayn
- Zuhayr ibn ʿAbbād
- Yaḥyá ibn Bukayr
- ʿUbayd Allāh ibn Mūsá
- Ādam ibn Abī Iyās
- `Abd Allāh ibn Ṣāliḥ al-ʿIjlī
- ʿAbd Allāh ibn Ṣāliḥ al-Kātib
- Muḥammad ibn ʿAbd Allāh al-Anṣārī

== Some of Abū Ḥātim's early students ==
The better known narrators who narrated from Abū Ḥātim:

- Abū Zurʿah al-Rāzī
- Yūnus ibn ʿAbd al-Aʿlá
- Abū Bakr ibn Abī al-Dunyā
- Mūsá ibn Isḥāq al-Anṣārī
- Abū Dāwūd
- Al-Nasāʾī
- Abū ʿAwānah al-Isfarāʾinī
- Abū al-Ḥasan al-Qaṭṭān
- Abū Bishr al-Dūlābī

== Praise ==
The Scholars’ and Imams’ commendations of him:

- Abū Zur’ah told Abū Ḥātim, “I have not seen [anyone] more intent on seeking the hadîth than you.”
- Yūnus ibn ʿAbd al-Aʿlá said, “Abu Zur’ah and Abū Hâtim are the two Imams of Khurasan.” He supplicated for them both and said, “Their continuance is an improvement for the Muslims.”
- ʿAbd al-Raḥmān ibn Abī Ḥātim said, “I heard Mūsâ bin Is·hâq al-Qâdî saying, ‘I have not seen [anyone] who memorised more hadith than your father,’ and he had met Abū Bakr Ibn Abi Shaybah, Ibn Numayr, Yahya ibn Ma'in, and Yahya al-Himmani.”
- Ahmad ibn Salamah an-Naisâbūrî said, “I have not seen after Ishaq and Muhammad ibn Yahya [anyone] more preserving of the hadîth or more knowledgeable of its meanings than Abi Hatim ar-Razi.”
- Uthman ibn Khurrazad said, “The most preserving of those I saw are four: Muhammad ibn al-Minhal ad-Darir, Ibrâhîm ibn ‘Ar’arah, Abu Zur’ah ar-Razi, and Abu Hatim.”
- Al-Khalili said, Abū Hâtim was a scholar of the Companions’ differences [of opinion] and the jurisprudence of the Followers and [those] after them. I heard my grandfather and a group [who] heard ‘Ali ibn Ibrahim al-Qattan saying, “I have not seen the like of Abu Hatim.” So we told him, “[But] you had seen Ibrâhîm al-Harbî and Isma’il al-Qadi.” He said, “I have not seen [anyone] more complete or more virtuous than Abu Hatim.”
- Abu al-Qasim al-Lalaka’i said, “Abū Hâtim was an imam, a ḥāfiẓ, a verifier.”
- Al-Khatib al-Baghdadi said, “Abū Hâtim was one of the credible, ḥāfiẓ imams.”
- Al-Dhahabi said, “He was among the oceans of knowledge. He travelled about the countries and excelled in the text and the chain [of transmission]. He gathered and compiled, disparaged and accredited, authenticated and deemed defective.” He said, “He was one of the notables and from the formidable imams of the People of the Relic … he was a neighbour in the arena of his comrade and relative, the ḥāfiẓ Abu Zur’ah.”

Jonathan A. C. Brown identifies him as one of the three most important hadith critics of his generation, alongside al-Bukhārī and Abū Zurʿah al-Rāzī (Hadith, 81).
