= Al-Munawi =

15th-century Islamic scholar

Imam Al-Munāwi
- المناوي
- Title: Zain al-Din; Al-Ḥāfiẓ

Personal life
- Born: (952 AH/1545 AD) Cairo, Ottoman Empire
- Died: (1031 AH/1621 AD) (aged 76) Cairo, Ottoman Empire
- Era: Late Middle Ages
- Region: Egypt
- Main interest(s): Islamic jurisprudence, Hadith sciences, History, Tasawwuf
- Notable work: Fayd al-Qadir
- Education: Al-Azhar University
- Occupation: Scholar, Traditionist, Jurist, Historian, Sufi

Religious life
- Religion: Islam
- Denomination: Sunni
- Jurisprudence: Shafi'i
- Creed: Ash'ari

Muslim leader
- Influenced by: Al-Shafi'i Abu Hasan al-Ash'ari Al-Suyuti Al-Sha'rani Shams al-Din al-Ramli

Muhammad 'Abd al-Ra'uf al-Munāwi (Arabic: محمد عبد الرؤوف المناوي), also known as Al-Munāwi (Arabic: المناوي) was an Egyptian Islamic scholar of the Ottoman period. He was a prominent Shafi'i jurist, hadith specialist, historian, and sufi mystic. He is considered one of the most greatest Sunni scholars and prolific writers of his time. His most celebrated work, Fayd al-Qadir, stands as a cornerstone of classical Islamic scholarship. He was the paternal great-grandson of Sharaf al-Din al-Munawi and was the famous disciple of Al-Sha'rani.

== Name and origin ==
The title "Al-Munawi" originated from the village of Munayt or Munāw, an area of Egypt where his ancestors settled around the 7th or 12th century after their departure from Tunisia.”

== Life ==
Al-Munawī was born in the city of Cairo in the year of 952 AH/1545 CE and was a member of was a member of prestigious family well known for their knowledge and piety. Both through his maternal great-grandfather Sharaf al-Din al-Munāwī and his father Tāj al-ʿĀrifīn. From a young age, he was devoted to the pursuit of knowledge. His first teacher was his father, under whose care he memorized the Quran before reaching puberty and also studied with him certain aspects of Arabic linguistics. Before entering puberty, he memorised the Qur'an as well as other valuable texts in Shafi'i Fiqh, Hadith, Arabic grammar, and Seerah.

Al-Munāwī did not leave any field of study from the scholars of his time without learning from them. Among his prominent teachers were Shams al-Dīn al-Ramlī (d. 1004/1596), Naṣīr al-Dīn al-Ṭablāwī (d. 1014/1606), Nūr al-Dīn ʿAlī ibn Ghānim al-Maqdisī (d. 1004/1596), Abū’l-Makārim Muḥammad al-Bakrī (d. 994/1586), Muḥammad ibn ʿAlī al-Samarqandī (d. 981/1573), and ʿAbd al-Wahhāb ibn Aḥmad al-Shaʿrānī (d. 973/1565).

He made a few religious services until he withdrew from society to compose. Then he went back to the outside world to teach at the University of Aliyya, where his extremely high calibre of instruction attracted the most illustrious academics of the day and caused some to make him so envious that he was certainly poisoned. He managed to get away, but he soon gave up teaching and began dictating his works to one of his sons, Taj al-Din Muhammad, who was now too frail to write them down.

Among his students were his two sons Zayn al-ʿĀbidīn ibn ʿAbd al-Raʾūf (d. 1026/1617) and Tāj al-Dīn Muḥammad ibn ʿAbd al-Raʾūf (d. ?), as well as notable scholars such as Sulaymān al-Bābilī (d. 1026/1617), Aḥmad ibn Muḥammad al-Maqqarī (d. 1041/1632), and ʿAlī ibn Muḥammad al-ʿUchūrī (d. 1066/1656), all of whom studied under his tutelage.

Al-Munāwī passed away in Cairo in 1031 AH / 1622 CE. He was buried in the place known today in Egypt as Zāwiyat al-Munāwī. Upon his death, it was said: “The Shāfiʿī of the age has died.” Elegies were composed in his memory.

== Reception ==
Since his childhood, al-Munāwī was occupied with the pursuit of knowledge. It was said about him: “There was no branch of knowledge into which he did not dip his bucket.” Likewise, al-Ziriklī stated that he was among the great scholars in both the religious and scientific fields, while al-Muḥibbī said that he had encompassed within himself the various branches of knowledge, and that no one was like him in this regard.

== Works ==
Al-Munāwī composed numerous works across various disciplines. Research indicates that he authored more than a hundred works. Among these are those that were completed or left unfinished, those that have survived to the present day, and others known only by name. Some of al-Munāwī's writings had already spread to different regions while he was still alive. He was careful, in authoring his works, to consider the needs of the public. Indeed, some of his books were written in response to the insistent requests of those around him.

Al-Munāwī became famous primarily for the commentaries (shurūḥ) he wrote. One of the greatest features of his commentaries is that he gathered scattered information from various sources and presented it as an integrated whole. His method was so admired that it was said of him: “He blended the commentary with the text as life is blended with the soul.” It is not possible here to discuss each of al-Munāwī's works individually. However, a brief overview of his writings in the field of ḥadīth may be given as follows:

1. Fayd al-Qadir Sharh al-Jami` al-Saghir – Considered his magnum opus, it is one of the best commentaries on Al-Jami' al-Saghir by al-Suyuti.
2. Bughyat al-Ṭālibīn li-Maʿrifat Iṣṭilāḥ al-Muḥaddithīn – A work on the principles of ḥadīth (ʿilm al-ḥadīth), consisting of an introduction and four sections.
3. Al-Jāmiʿ al-Azhar min Ḥadīth al-Nabiyy al-Anwar – Al-Munāwī authored this book to include the ḥadīths that are not found in al-Suyūṭī's al-Jāmiʿ al-Kabīr.
4. Al-Adʿiyat al-Mabrūra bi’l-Aḥādīth al-Maʾthūra – A work written by al-Munāwī on transmitted (maʾthūr) supplications.
5. Al-Yawāqīt wa’l-Durar Sharḥ Sharḥ Nukhbat al-Fikar – A gloss (ḥāshiya) on Nuzhat al-Naẓar, the commentary authored by Ibn Ḥajar (d. 852/1449) on his own Nukhbat al-Fikar.
6. Sharh al-Tirmidhi – A commentary of Sunan al-Tirmidhi by Al-Tirmidhi
7. Futuhat Subhaniyyah fi Sharh al-Alfiyyah al-Iraqi – A commentary of Alfiyya of al-Iraqi by Zain al-Din al-'Iraqi.
8. 'Al-Majmūʿ al-Fāʾiq min Ḥadīth Khātimat Rusul al-Khalāʾiq – A compilation of brief prophetic traditions (ḥadīths) selected by al-Munāwī from various sources.
9. Al-Fatḥ al-Samāwī bi-Takhrīj Aḥādīth Tafsīr al-Qāḍī al-Bayḍāwī – Written as a study of al-Bayḍāwī's (d. 685/1286) Qurʾānic commentary Anwār al-Tanzīl, in which al-Munāwī traced and authenticated the ḥadīths cited therein.
10. Al-Ithāfāt al-Saniyya bi’l-Aḥādīth al-Qudsiyya – A collection of ḥadīths qudsiyya (divine sayings), arranged alphabetically, containing a total of 272 narrations.
11. Sharḥ al-Arbaʿīn – A commentary on al-Nawawī's Arbaʿīn (Forty Ḥadīths). The manuscript is preserved in the Süleymaniye Library under the title Sharḥ al-Aḥādīth al-Nabawiyya li’l-Nawawī.
12. Sharḥ Risālat al-Bakrī fī Faḍl Laylat al-Niṣf min Shaʿbān – As the title indicates, this is a commentary on a treatise by his teacher Abū’l-Makārim Muḥammad al-Bakrī, titled al-Nubdha, concerning the merits of the night of mid-Shaʿbān (the Night of Barāʾa).
13. Al-Maṭālib al-ʿAliyya – Another work by al-Munāwī concerning supplications (duʿāʾ).
14. Rafʿ al-Niqāb ʿan Kitāb al-Shihāb – A commentary on Shihāb al-Akhbār, a collection of concise ḥadīths compiled by al-Qudāʿī (d. 454/1062).
15. Isʿāf al-Ṭullāb bi-Sharḥ Tartīb al-Shihāb – Another commentary written on Shihāb al-Akhbār.
16. Kunūz al-Ḥaqāʾiq min Ḥadīth Khayr al-Khalāʾiq – A compilation of short prophetic traditions selected by al-Munāwī, arranged so that each page of the book contains one hundred ḥadīths.

His other known works include:

- Al-Kawakib al-Durriyya fi Tarajim al-Sufiyya ("The Glittering Stars in the Biographies of the Sufis"), a biographical dictionary on Sufis.
- Al-Nukhbat fi Fadayil Ahl al-Bayt ("The Elite in the Virtues of Ahl al-Bayt")
- Al-Lali al-Jawhariat fi Sharh Hikam al-'Ata'iyah, an explanation of Hikam al-'Ata'iyah by Ibn Ata Allah al-Iskandari

== See also ==
- List of Ash'aris
- List of Sufis
