= Abu Yaʽla al-Mawsili =

Ninth century Muslim hadith scholar

Abu Yaʽla al-Mawsili أبو يعلى أحمد بن علي بن المثنى الموصلي

Personal life
- Born: 210 A.H. (825 CE) Mosul, Iraq
- Died: 307 A.H. (919 CE)
- Main interest: Hadith studies
- Notable work: Musnad Abu Yaʽla
- Occupation: Muhaddith, Hadith compiler, Islamic scholar

Religious life
- Religion: Islam
- Denomination: Sunni

Muslim leader
- Influenced by: Abu Bakr ibn Abi Shaybah, Ali ibn al-Madini, Yahya ibn Ma'in
- Influenced: Ibn Hibban, Al-Tabarani

Abū Yaʽlā Ahmad ibn ʿAli ibn al - Muthanna al - Mawṣilī ( Arabic: أبو يعلى أحمد بن علي بن المثنى الموصلي) (210 AH/825 CE - 307 AH/919 CE) was a prominent Islamic scholar and traditionist known for his contributions to the collection and transmission of hadith (prophetic traditions). he is often associated with the city of Mosul (al-Mawṣil) in present day Iraq, where he was born and lived.

Abu Yaʽla is best known for his Musnad (collection of hadith), often referred to as Musnad Abu Yaʽla. His work follows the Musnad format, arranging hadiths by the names of the companions of the Prophet Muhammad who narrated them. It is a valuable source for hadith scholars and serves as a complement to other Musnad works like that of Ahmad ibn Hanbal. He was considered a reliable hadith compiler, although some critics have raised questions about the authenticity of specific narrations in his Musnad. Despite this, his work remains widely referenced in the field of hadith studies.

He studied under leading scholars of his time, including Abu Bakr ibn Abi Shaybah, Ali ibn al-Madini, Yahya ibn Ma'in and others, among his prominent students were Ibn Hibban and Al-Tabarani.
