= Habibur Rahman Azami (scholar, born 1941) =

Indian Hadith scholar (1941–2021)

Mawlana Habibur Rahman Azami

Editor-in-chief of Monthly Darul Uloom
- In office 1985 – November 2016
- Preceded by: Riyasat Ali Zafar Bijnori
- Succeeded by: Salman Bijnori

Personal life
- Born: 1941 Jagdishpur, Azamgarh district, United Provinces, British India
- Died: 12 May 2021 (aged 79–80) Jagdishpur, Azamgarh district, Uttar Pradesh, India
- Main interest(s): Hadith studies, Hadith terminology, biographical evaluation, biography
- Education: Darul Uloom Mau; Darul Uloom Deoband
- Occupation: Islamic Hadith scholar, writer

Religious life
- Religion: Islam
- Denomination: Sunni
- Jurisprudence: Hanafi
- Movement: Deobandi

Muslim leader
- Teacher: Syed Fakhruddin Ahmad; Ibrahim Balyawi; Muhammad Tayyib Qasmi; Sharif Hasan Deobandi; Habib al-Rahman al-A'zami
- Disciple of: Mahmood Saharanpuri

Habibur Rahman Azami (1941–12 May 2021), also written as Habibur Rahman Qasmi Azmi, was an Indian Islamic scholar, writer, and expert in the field of biographical evaluation of hadith narrators. He served as a professor of hadith at Darul Uloom Deoband. He served as the 6th editor-in-chief of Monthly Darul Uloom. He authored several books, including Shuyukh al-Imam Abi Dawud al-Sijistani fī Kitab al-Sunan (The Teachers of Imam Abu Dawud in His Sunan), Tazkirah Ulama-e-Azamgarh (A Memoir of Islamic slars of Azamgarh), Ajodhya ke Islami Aathar (Islamic Heritage of Ayodhya), and Babri Masjid: Haqaiq aur Afsanay (Babri Mosque: Facts and Myths).

== Early life and education ==
Habibur Rahman Azami was born in 1361 AH (1941 CE) in Jagdishpur, Azamgarh district, British India.

He began his early education with Nazra (recitation) of the Qur'an and basic Persian books in his village and later in a nearby village, Baraipur. He then attended Madrasa Rauzatul Uloom in Phulpur, where he studied some introductory Arabic and Persian texts, including Gulistan of Saadi with Abdul Ghani Phulpuri.

Afterward, he went to Madrasa Bayt al-Uloom in Sarai Mir, where he completed his middle grades in Arabic studies. He then pursued higher studies in Arabic until the seventh grade at Darul Uloom Mau. In 1962, he enrolled in Darul Uloom Deoband to complete his advanced Islamic studies, graduating in 1384 AH (1964 CE) after completing the Dawra-e-Hadith (final year of Dars-i Nizami).

His teachers of hadith at Darul Uloom Deoband included Syed Fakhruddin Ahmad, Ibrahim Balyawi, Muhammad Tayyib Qasmi, Bashir Ahmed Khan Balundshahri, Fakhrul Hasan Muradabadi, Sharif Hasan Deobandi, Islamul Haq Azmi, and Abdul Ahad Deobandi.

He received permission (Ijazah) in Hadith from Habib al-Rahman al-A'zami.

== Career ==
After graduating, he briefly joined the preaching department of Madrasa Rauzatul Uloom in Phulpur. He then began his teaching career at Madrasa Ashraf al-Madaris in Ghosi, where he served as Sadr-ul-Mudarrisīn (Principal). Later, he moved to Madrasa Islamia in Reori Talab, Varanasi, and subsequently taught for eight months at Madrasah Qurania in Jaunpur and for a year at Madrasa Islamia in Mangrawan, Azamgarh. He eventually returned to Madrasa Islamia in Rewri Talab, Varanasi, where he taught until 1980.

In 1980, upon the request of Mu’tamar-e-Fudala-e-Darul Uloom Deoband (transl. Conference of Alumni of Darul Uloom Deoband), particularly Asad Madani, he moved to Deoband to oversee an international conference and edit its monthly journal, Al-Qasim. In 1402 AH (1982 CE), he was appointed a teacher at Darul Uloom Deoband, and in 1985, he became the editor-in-chief of Monthly Darul Uloom, a position he held until November 2016.

In 1982–83, he was appointed as a member of the executive committee of Jamiat Ulama-e-Hind, where he served until his death. In 1420 AH, he was appointed the supervisor and later the head of the Committee for Refutation of Christianity at Darul Uloom, a position he held until 1438 AH.

At Darul Uloom, he taught important texts like Sunan Abu Dawud, Mishkat al-Masabih, Nukhbat al-Fikr, and Muqaddimah Ibn al-Salah. After the demise of Saeed Ahmad Palanpuri, he was also assigned parts of Sahih al-Bukhari, but due to the nationwide lockdown beginning on 24 March 2020, the madrasas were closed.

He pledged allegiance to Zakariyya Kandhlawi. After the demise of Kandhlawi, he was authorized by Mahmood Saharanpuri, an authorized disciple of Hussain Ahmad Madani.

== Literary works ==
His works include:

- Shuyukh al-Imam Abi Dawud al-Sijistani fi Kitab al-Sunan
- Shajarat al-Tayyibah (Biography of Sheikh Tayyib Banarsi)
- Maqalat-e-Habib (a collection of his articles in three volumes)
- Tazkirah Ulama-e-Azamgarh (a memoir of Azamgarh's Islamic scholars)
- Sharh Urdu Muqaddimah Shaykh Abdul Haq (a commentary on the foreword later written by Abd al-Haqq al-Dehlawi for Mishkat al-Masabih)
- Intiqā-u-Kitab al-Akhlaq
- Hindustan mein Imarat-e-Shariah ka nizaam aur Jamiat Ulama-e-Hind ki jidd-o-jahd (the System of Imarat-e-Shariah in India and the Struggles of Jamiat Ulama-e-Hind)
- Islam mein Tasawwur-e-Imārat (the Concept of Leadership in Islam)
- Mutahida Qaumiyat Ulama-e-Islam ki Nazar Mein (United Nationalism in the View of Islamic Scholars)
- Khumainiyat Asr-e-Haazir ka Azeem Fitna (Khomeinism: The Great Fitnah of Our Times)
- Firqah Asna Ashriyah Fuqaha-e-Islam ki Nazar Mein (The Twelver Shia Sect in the View of Islamic Jurists)
- Khalifa Mehdi Sahih Ahadith ki Roshni Mein (The Mahdi in the Light of Authentic Hadiths)
- Talaq-e-Thalath Sahih Makhaz ki Roshni Mein (Triple Talaq in the Light of Authentic Sources)
- Imam ke Peechay Muqtadi ki Qirat ka Hukm (The Ruling on Recitation Behind the Imam)
- Tahqeeq Masla Raf'ul Yadain Research on the Issue of Raf'ul Yadain (Raising the Hands During Salah)
- Masail-e-Namaz (Issues of Salah)
- Khawateen-e-Islam ki Behtareen Masjid (The Best Mosque for Muslim Women)
- Ilm-e-Hadith Mein Imam Abu Hanifa ka Maqam o Martaba (The Status of Imam Abu Hanifa in the Science of Hadith)
- Ayodhya ke Islami Asaar (Islamic Heritage of Ayodhya)
- Babri Masjid Haqaiq aur Afsanay (Babri Mosque: Facts and Myths)

== Death ==
He died on 30 Ramadan 1442 AH (12 May 2021 CE), a Thursday, at around 12:15 PM, following a brief illness. He was buried in his ancestral graveyard in Jagdishpur, Azamgarh.

== See also ==
- List of Deobandis
