= Abu Zurʽa al-Razi =

9th-century Persian Muslim scholar

Abū Zur'a Ubaydullah ibn 'Abd al-Karim al-Rāzī

Personal life
- Born: 809 C.E/ 193 A.H or 815 C.E/199 A.H Ray, Iran
- Died: 878 C.E/ 264 A.H
- Occupation: Muhaddith

Religious life
- Religion: Islam
- Denomination: Sunni
- Jurisprudence: Mujtahid (formerly Hanafi)
- Creed: Athari

Abu Zurʽa Ubaydullah ibn Abdul-Karim ibn Yazid ibn Faruh (أبو زرعة الرازي, 815/816 or 809/810, in Rey, Iran – 878, in Rey) was a Muslim scholar, Muhaddith from Rey (northern Iran). Zurʽa al-Razi was a relative of another famous Muhaddith Abu Hatim al-Razi (Muhammad ibn Idris).

Not to be confused with Abu Zurʽa Ahmad ibn Husayn al-Razi (al-Razi al-Mutawassit or al-Saghir).
