= Sunan Sa'id ibn Mansur =

- Author: Sa'id ibn Mansur
- Original title: سنن سعيد ابن منصور
- Language: Arabic
- Genre: Hadith collection

Sunan Sa'id ibn Mansur, or Sunan Sa'id bin Mansur or Sunan Sayeed bin Mansur (Arabic: سنن سعيد ابن منصور), is one of the Hadith book compiled in third century of the Muslim calendar. It was written by Imam Sa'id ibn Mansur (died in 227 AH).

== Description ==
It contains almost three thousand (3000) hadiths according to Al-Maktaba Al-Shamela. It is one of the oldest Musnad (a kind of Hadith book) written. It is written in third century of Islamic calendar and written before the Sahihain: (Sahih al-Bukhari and Sahih Muslim). The book was famous among the scholars.

== Publications ==
The book has been published by many organizations around the world:

- Sunan Sa‘īd ibn Manṣūr (8 v.)by Sa‘īd ibn Manṣūr : Published: al-Riyāḍ : Dār al-Ṣumay‘ī lil-Nashr wa-al-Tawzī‘, 1993–2012.

== See also ==
- List of Sunni books
- Kutub al-Sittah
- Sahih Muslim
- Jami al-Tirmidhi
- Sunan Abu Dawood
- Jami' at-Tirmidhi
- Either: Sunan ibn Majah, Muwatta Malik
