= Sahih Ibn Hibban =

Book by Ibn Hibban

Sahih Ibn Hibbaan
- Author: Muhammad ibn Hibban ibn Ahmad al-Tamimi al-Busti
- Language: Arabic
- Subject: hadith

Ṣaḥīḥ Ibn Ḥibbān (صحيح ابن حبان) is a collection of hadith by Sunni scholar Ibn Hibban. It has the distinction of being one of small number of collections intended by the respective authors to contain only authentic hadith. The author of this Sahih is Abu Hatim Muhammad ibn Hibban ibn Ahmad al-Tamimi al-Busti, from Bust in Khorasan in present-day southern Afghanistan (former name of Helmand province capital was bost or bust, its new name is Lashkargah). He was a prominent Shafi'i hadith specialist and prolific author who died in 965 CE.

== Overview ==
The actual name of this collection is al Musnad al Sahih al-Taqasim wa al-Anwa`, however, it is commonly referred to as Sahih ibn Hibban. The author utilized an innovative method in the arrangement of this work as it is not arranged in topical chapters nor is it based upon a musnad arrangement and is therefore difficult to navigate. Instead, it was arranged first by bab, or chapter, and then under each chapter, by naw`, or type. The book opens with a lengthy introduction.

The Sahih remains in its entirety as of the late Nineteenth Century or early Twentieth Century, according to al-Kattani, who died in 1926.

== Description ==
The book contains almost seven and a half thousand (7500) hadiths according to Al-Maktaba Al-Shamela.

== Authenticity ==
According to al-Kattani, "it has been said that Ibn Hibban, after ibn Khuzaymah, authored the most authentic hadith collection, after Sahih Bukhari and Sahih Muslim". However, al-Suyuti spoke more definitively when saying that Sahih Ibn Khuzaymah was the most authentic collection after Sahih Bukhari and Sahih Muslim, followed by Sahih Ibn Hibban which, in turn, was more authentic than Al-Mustadrak alaa al-Sahihain, making Sahih Ibn Hibban the fourth most authentic hadith collection in Suyuti's view.

== Derivative Works ==
Al-Ihsan: Ali ibn Balban (d. 739/1339) rearranged the hadith chapters of Sahih Ibn Hibban according to the topics of jurisprudence and published them as al-Ihsan fi Taqrib Sahih Ibn Hibban.

Mawarid al-Zam'an : The unique hadith it contains, those not found in either Sahih Bukhari or Sahih Muslim, are arranged in the order of jurisprudence headings in the book Mawarid al-Zam'an ila Zawa'id Ibn Hibban by Ali ibn Abu Bakr al-Haythami (d. 807/1405).

== Publications ==
The book has been published by various publishers around the globe:

- Sahih ibn HIbban (صحيح ابن حبان) : Published:Dare ibn Hizm (دار ابن حزم)
- Sahih Ibn Hibban (8 vol) صحيح ابن حبان: Published: Dar Ibn Hazm, Beirut, 2012
- Sahih Ibn Hibban By Abu Hatim Muhammad Ibn Hibban (Arabic): Published: Dar Ibn Hazm
