= Sahih Ibn Khuzaymah =

Ninth-century collection of hadith

- Author: Abu Bakr Muhammad ibn Ishaq ibn Khuzaymah
- Language: Arabic
- Genre: Hadith collection
- Original text: Sahih Ibn Khuzaymah at Arabic Wikisource

Sahih Ibn Khuzaymah (Arabic: صحيح ابن خزيمة, romanized: Ṣaḥīḥ Ibn Khuzaymah) is a hadith collection compiled by the ninth-century scholar Ibn Khuzaymah (837 CE/223 AH – 923 CE/311 AH).

== Description ==
The book contains almost three thousand (3000) hadiths according to Maktaba Shamila. His work is commonly known as Ṣaḥiḥ Ibn Khuzaymah. According to Ibn Ḥajar, the actual title of the book is Kitâb Al-Ṣaḥîḥ, The Authentic Book. Its virtue, according to Ibn Ḥajar, is that every narration in it is supported by a continuous linkage of upright narrators without any breaks in the chain or any narrators that have been deemed unreliable.

== The Methodology of the Book ==
- The author organized the narrations into chapters and sub-chapters in accordance with the prominent organization of ḥadîth books during his time. Hence, he begins with the chapter of wudû’(ablution), followed by ṣalah, and so forth. In the chapter (kitâb al-wudû’), he nests subchapters known as “abwâb,” literally “doors” or “gates.”
- The Hadiths of his book are supported by chains of narrators that go from him back to the Islamic prophet, Muhammad. If a ḥadîth has more than one narration, he mentions them all.
- The author generally follows up the narration with a short, scholarly discussion about the chain of narrators (sanad) and the Text (matn). He pays meticulous attention to the wording of the Text, to the degree that he makes sure to distinguish the short vowels of a word (in an undiacriticized Text) that he deems to require emphasis or greater clarify. Clarifying the unwritten vowels is known among scholars as “ḍabt al-alfâ·.” It is not achieved by applying the diacritical marks to the Text, such as by adding fat ḥa and ḍammah, because these marks are highly subject to error during transcription. Rather, scholars wrote out in their explications, for example, such and such letter of such and such word has a ḍamma on it, or such and such letter has two dots over it.
- If there are varying narrations of the same ḥadith, the author takes care to make clear the variations and distinguish between them.
- The author often begins his explanatory discussions that follow the ḥadîth with the phrase: “Ibn Khuzaymah said….”
- Most of the time, he mentions his fiqhi (juristic) opinions about an issue in the form of a subtitle preceding the ḥadîth that has elicited from him his opinion—as is common in other ḥadith.

== Publications ==
The book has been published by many organizations around the world:

- Sahih Ibn Khuzaymah(3 Volumes) by Ibn Khuzaymah : Published: Dar al-Nawadir | Syria-Lebanon-Kuwait
- Sahih Ibn Khuzaymah (صحيح ابن خزيمة): Published: المكتب الإسلامي
- Sahih Ibn Khuzaymah; Arabic, 3 Vol.: Published: Dar Al-Kotob Al-Ilmiyyah, Bei

== See also ==
- List of Sunni books
- Kutub al-Sittah
- Sahih Muslim
- Jami al-Tirmidhi
- Sunan Abu Dawood
- Jami' at-Tirmidhi
- Either: Sunan ibn Majah, Muwatta Malik
