= Musnad Abu Awanah =

Musnad Abu Awaanah
- Author: Abu Awaanah al-Isfaraʼini
- Original title: مسند ابي عوانه
- Language: Arabic
- Genre: Hadith collection

Musnad Abi ʽAwanah is a collection of hadith compiled by the Islamic scholar Abu ʽAwaanah al-Isfaraʼini. It is also known as Mustakhraj Abi ʽAwanah.

== Description ==
It is written in fourth century of Islamic calendar. The musnad are collections of hadiths which are classified by narrators, and therefore by sahabas (companions of the Islamic prophet Muhammad). It was compiled by Imam Abu ʽAwaanah al-Isfaraʼini in the late third century and early fourth century of the Islamic Calendar. He claimed all hadith in it were authentic according to the conditions of Sahih Muslim.

== Publications ==
The book has been published by many organizations around the world:

- Musnad Abi ʽAwanah 1/5 - Islam - Hadith - Early Work by Abu ʽAwaanah al-Isfaraʼini: Published: Dar al-Marefeh, 2008 | UK
- Musnad / Abu ʽAwanah Yaʽqub ibn Ishaq Isfaraʼini. : Published: Daral-Maʽarifah lil-Talaʽah wa al-Mashr, [198-] | Libraries Australia

== See also ==
- List of Sunni books
- Kutub al-Sittah
- Sahih Muslim
- Jami al-Tirmidhi
- Sunan Abu Dawood
- Jami' at-Tirmidhi
- Either: Sunan ibn Majah, Muwatta Malik
