= Musannaf Ibn Abi Shaybah =

Compilation of hadiths

- Author: Ibn Abi Shaybah
- Original title: مصنف ابن أبي شىيبة
- Language: Arabic
- Genre: Hadith collection

Musannaf Ibn Abi Shaybah (Arabic: مصنف ابن ابي شىيبة) is the second largest hadith collection ever compiled and one of the most known musannaf compiled by Ibn Abi Shaybah (159H-235H / 775–849 CE). He curated reports of Prophet Muhammad, his predecessors and companions. Since the loss of imam Baqi ibn Makhlad's Musnad after the Spanish Reconquista, Musannaf Ibn Abi Shaybah remained the world's biggest hadith compilation.

== Description ==
It is the second largest compilations of Hadiths, including more than thirty seven thousand (37,000) Hadiths. He listed 125 Hadiths which Abu Hanifa contradicted

Ibn Abi Shaybah narrated reports from predecessors about each subject area, including the controversial topics of discussions between Muslims, like the Battle of Siffin, the Battle of the Camel, the Battle of Nahrawan and the death of the 3rd Caliph, Uthman. It includes Ahadeeth classified as Sahih (sound), marfoo‘ (attributed to Muhammad), mawqoof (attributed to the Companions), and munqaṭiʻ (with discontinuity in chain of transmission).

Multiple manuscripts have been preserved (some printed more recently in Delhi, India and volumes of much more earlier manuscripts also exist) and some may differ.

== See also ==
- List of Sunni books
- Kutub al-Sittah
- Sahih Muslim
- Jami al-Tirmidhi
- Sunan Abu Dawood
- Either: Sunan ibn Majah, Muwatta Malik
