= Ibn Abi Shaybah =

Muslim hadith scholar

Imam Abu Bakr Ibn Abi Shaybah امام أبو بكر ابن أبي شيبة
- Title: Imam

Personal life
- Born: 159 A.H. (775 CE) Kufa, Iraq
- Died: 235 A.H. (849 CE)
- Main interest(s): Hadith studies
- Notable work(s): Musannaf Ibn Abi Shaybah
- Occupation: Muhaddith, Hadith compiler, Islamic scholar

Religious life
- Religion: Islam
- Denomination: Sunni

Muslim leader
- Influenced: Al-Bukhari

Ibn Abī Shaybah or Imām Abū Bakr Ibn Abī Shaybah or Abū Bakr ʿAbd Allāh ibn Muḥammad Ibn Abī Shaybah Ibrāhīm ibn ʿUthmān al-ʿAbsī al-Kūfī (Arabic: امام أبو بكر عبد الله بن محمد بن أبي شيبة إبراهيم بن عثمان العبسي الكوفي) (159H – 235H / 775–849 CE) was Muslim jurist and scholar of hadith. He authored a musannaf work commonly known as Musannaf Ibn Abi Shaybah, the second largest hadith compilation ever and one of the earliest extant works in that genre. Alongside Ahmad ibn Hanbal, Ali ibn al-Madini and Yahya ibn Ma'in, Ibn Abi Shaybah has been considered by many Muslim specialists in hadith to be one of the four most significant authors in the field.

== Biography ==
He was born in Kufa, Iraq in 159H. He was the author of large voluminous works such as Musannaf Ibn Abi Shaybah, Al-Musnad and others. He heard from a large group of the scholars from the reliable and trustworthy Imams, such as Sufyan ibn 'Uyaynah, 'Abd Allah ibn Al-Mubarak and 'Abd al-Rahman ibn Mahdi. Imam Ahmad ibn Hanbal and his son, 'Abd Allah, reported on his authority and he is from the shuyukh (teachers) of the famous Imams: Al-Bukhari, Muslim, Abu Dawud and Ibn Majah. Abu 'Ubayd Al-Qasim ibn Salam said: "The leading scholars of Hadith are four: The most knowledgeable of them of the Halal and the Haram (Lawful and Unlawful) is Ahmad ibn Hanbal. The best at listing hadeeth and placing them in the right context is Ali ibn al-Madini. The best at writing a book is Ibn Abi Shaybah. And the most knowledgeable of which hadith are authentic and which are weak is Yahya ibn Ma'in." He added that: "(Knowledge of) the Hadeeth ultimately goes back to four (people): to Abu Bakr Ibn Abi Shaybah, Ahmad ibn Hanbal, Yahya ibn Ma'in and 'Ali ibn al-Madini. So Abu Bakr (Ibn Abi Shaybah) is the best among them at presenting it (i.e. the hadith). Ahmad is the one with the most Fiqh (understanding) of it among them. Yahya is best among them at gathering and collecting it. And 'Ali is the most knowledgeable amongst them of it." Al-'Ijli said: "He is reliable (thiqqah) and a Hafiz." Al-Khatib al-Baghdadi said: "He was precise in his narration (mutqin), memorized many ahadith (hafiz), and produced many works (mukthir). He wrote the books Al-Musnad, Al-Ahkam, and At-Tafsir." Al-Hafiz Al-Dhahabi described him as: "The Grand and unique Hafiz, and the one who is reliable (in narration)." He died at the age of 76 (235H).

== Writings ==
Below is a summary of the discussion of Imam Ibn Abi Shaybah available works in Maktabah al-Shamilah and published in Beirut, Lebanon.

- Musannaf Ibn Abi Shaybah
- Musnad Ibn Abi Shaybah
- Adab le Ibn Abi Shaybah
