= Al-Waqidi =

Muslim historian and biographer of Muhammad (c. 747–823)

Abu Abd Allah Muhammad ibn Umar ibn Waqid al-Aslami
- أبو عبد الله محمد بن عمر بن واقد الاسلمي
- Title: Al-Waqidi

Personal life
- Born: c. 130AH / AD 747 Medina
- Died: 207AH / AD 823
- Era: Islamic golden age
- Main interest: History of Islam
- Notable work(s): Kitab al-Tarikh wa al-Maghazi ("Book of History and Campaigns")

Religious life
- Religion: Islam

Muslim leader
- Influenced: Ibn Sa'd

Abu Abd Allah Muhammad ibn Umar ibn Waqid al-Aslami (Arabic: أبو عبد الله محمد بن عمر بن واقد الاسلمي, romanized: Abū ʿAbd Allāh Muḥammad ibn ʿUmar ibn Wāqid al-Aslamī) (c. 130 – 207 AH; commonly referred to as al-Waqidi (Arabic: الواقدي; c. 747 – 823 AD) was an early Arab Muslim historian and biographer of the Islamic prophet Muhammad, specializing in his military campaigns. His surname is derived from his grandfather's name Waqid, and thus he became famous as al-Imam al-Waqidi. He served as a judge (qadi) for the Abbasid caliph al-Ma'mun. Several of al-Waqidi's works are known through his scribe and student (in the field of the al-maghazi genre), Ibn Sa'd.

== Biography ==
Al-Waqidi was born in Medina around 748 AD (130 AH). He was the mawla (client) of ‘Abd Allah ibn Burayda of the Banu Aslam of Medina. According to Abu Faraj al-Isfahani, al-Waqidi’s mother was the daughter of ‘Isa ibn Ja‘far ibn Sa’ib Khathir, a Persian, and the great-granddaughter of Sa’ib, who introduced music to Medina. Amongst his prominent teachers were Ibn Abi Thahab Ma'mar bin Rashid, Malik ibn Anas and Sufyan al-Thawri. He lived in Medina at the time of Abu Hanifa and Ja'far al-Sadiq and studied in Al-Masjid an-Nabawi as a student of Malik ibn Anas. Al-Waqidi also had access to the grandchildren of Muhammad's companions. Al-Waqidi originally earned a living as a wheat trader, but when a calamity struck at the age of 50, he migrated to Iraq during the reign of Harun ar-Rashid. He was appointed a judge of eastern Baghdad, and Harun ar-Rashid's heir al-Ma'mun later appointed him the qadi of a military camp at Resafa.

Al-Waqidi concentrated on history, and was acknowledged as a master of the genre by many of his peers. His books on the early Islamic expeditions and conquests predate much of the Sunni and Shia literature of the later Abbasid period. His works regarding the battles of Muhammad and his companions were considered reliable by most early Islamic scholars. While still regarded as an important source for early Islamic history, later authors debated the reliability of his works. Western orientalists who enjoyed his writings include Martin Lings and Tilman Nagel.

== Works ==
Al-Waqidi is primarily known for his Kitab al-Tarikh wa al-Maghazi (Arabic: كتاب التاريخ والمغازي, "Book of History and Campaigns"), which is the only part of his corpus that has been fully preserved. It describes the battles fought by Muhammad, as well as Muhammad's life in the city of Medina. The work draws upon the earlier sira of Ibn Ishaq, though it includes details not found in Ibn Ishaq's text.

A number of works chronicling the Islamic conquests have been attributed to al-Waqidi, though most of these attributions are now believed to be mistaken. Futuh al-Sham (Arabic: كتاب فتوح الشام, "Book of the Conquests of Syria"), a novelization of the Islamic army's conquests of Byzantine Syria, has traditionally been ascribed to al-Waqidi. Modern scholars generally classify Futuh al-Sham as a falsely-attributed later work, dating it to around the time of the Crusades, though some scholars believe a small portion of the text may be traced back to al-Waqidi. In addition to depicting the battles of the Islamic armies, the work also details the valor of various Muslim women, including Hind bint Utbah, Khawlah bint al-Azwar, and Asma bint Abi Bakr.

According to Ibn al-Nadim, al-Waqidi authored a book detailing the death of Husayn ibn Ali, though this work has not survived. Other lost texts attributed to al-Waqidi include a book chronicling the last days of Muhammad's life. The works of al-Waqidi's student Ibn Sa'd may contain some excerpts from these texts.

== Published editions ==
=== English ===
- Translated, edited by Rizwi Faizer and published in the USA and Canada by Routledge 270 Madison Avenue, New York.online link

== Islamic criticism ==
Waqidi has faced criticism regarding his scholarly reliability from many later Sunni Islamic scholars, including:

- al-Shafi’i (150–204 A.H.) said "All the books of al-Waqidi are lies. In Medina there were seven men who used to fabricate authorities, one of which was al-Waqidi."
- Yahya ibn Ma'in (158–233 A.H.) said "He is weak. He is nothing. Not reliable!"
- Ali ibn al-Madini (161–241 A.H.) said "He fabricates Hadith"
- Ishaq ibn Rahwayh (161–238 A.H.) said "According to my view, he is one of those who fabricate Hadith"
- Ahmad ibn Hanbal (164–241 A.H.) said "He is a liar, makes alternations in the traditions"
- Abu Zur’a al-Razi (193–264 A.H.) said "(Waqidi's writing) Abandoned, Weak"
- Al-Bukhari (194–256 A.H.) said "al-Waqidi has been abandoned in hadith. He fabricates hadith"
- Abu Hatim Muhammad ibn Idris al-Razi (195–277 A.H.) said "He fabricates hadith. We have abandoned his hadith"
- Abu Dawood (202–275 A.H.) said "I do not write his hadith and I do not report (hadith) on his authority. I have no doubt that he used to make up hadith"
- al-Baladhuri (207–278 A.H.) said "al-Waqidi is matruk (known as a liar).
- Al-Nasa’i (214–303 A.H.) said "The liars known for fabricating the hadith of the Messenger of Allah are four. They are: Ibn Abi Yahya in Medina, al-Waqidi in Baghdad, Muqatil ibn Sulayman in Khurasan and Muhammad ibn Sa'id in Syria."
- Ibn ‘Adi (277–365 A.H.) said "His traditions are not safe and there is danger from him (in accepting his traditions)"
- Al-Daraqutni (306–385 A.H.) said "There is weakness in him (in his reporting)"
- Al-Nawawi (631–676 A.H.): said "Their (muhaddithin scholars) consensus is that al-Waqidi is weak"
- Al-Dhahabi (675–748 A.H.) said "Consensus has taken place on the weakness of al-Waqidi"
- Ibn Hajar al-Asqalani (773–852 A.H.) said "He has been abandoned in spite of vastness of his knowledge"
- Muhammad Nasiruddin al-Albani (1914–1999 C.E.) said that al-Waqidi is a liar.

Even among those who questioned his authenticity many still considered him a pillar in history and accepted his narrations in this regard. Ibn Hajar Asqalani records: "He is acceptable in the narrations of the battles according to our companions and Allah knows the best."

Some of his criticisms are written in books written centuries later even though the claimed criticisms are made by people who were born around his time.

== Western criticism ==
Patricia Crone gives al-Waqidi as an example of the phenomenon whereby the farther an Islamic commentary on Muhammad's life was removed in time from his life and the events in the Quran, the more information it provided.

If one storyteller should happen to mention a raid, the next storyteller would know the date of this raid, while the third would know everything that an audience might wish to hear about.

This was despite the fact later commentaries depended on the earlier sources for their content, which suggested that if later commentaries differed in length from earlier work they should be briefer as some facts about the early days were lost or forgotten. (Crone attributed the phenomenon to storytellers' embellishment.) Commentary works of Al-Waqidi were much larger than those of the oldest prophetic biography Ibn Ishaq (died 767) despite the fact that al-Waqidi's later works covered a shorter period of time (only Muhammad's period in Medina).

Waqidi will always give precise dates, locations, names, where Ibn Ishaq has none, accounts of what triggered the expedition, miscellaneous information to lend color to the event ... But given that this information was all unknown to Ibn Ishaq, its value is doubtful in the extreme. And if spurious information accumulated at this rate in the two generations between Ibn Ishaq and al-Waqidi, it is hard to avoid the conclusion that even more must have accumulated in the three generations between the Prophet and Ibn Ishaq.

Historian Michael Cook gives an example of the difference in accounts of the death of Muhammad's father Abdullah ibn Abd al-Muttalib. Ibn Ishaq relates that some say he died while Muhammad's mother was pregnant with Muhammad was born and some while Muhammad was 28 months old; another commentator (Ma'mar ibn Rashid) says that he died in Yathrib after being sent there to lay stores of dates. About a half a century later al-Waqidi relates that

'Abdallah had gone to Gaza on business, had fallen ill on the way back, and died in Yathrib after leaving the caravan he was with to be nursed by relations there. Waqidi was further able to specify Abdallah's age at death and the exact place of his burial. ...[that the death] took place ... while Muhammad was still in the womb,

and that while there were "other accounts of the matter" his was the best.

== Early Islamic scholars ==
Early Islamic scholars

Muhammad, The final Messenger of God (570–632) the Constitution of Medina, taught the Quran, and advised his companions
Abdullah ibn Masud (died 653) taught	Ali (607–661) fourth caliph taught	Aisha, Muhammad's wife and Abu Bakr's daughter taught	Abd Allah ibn Abbas (618–687) taught	Zayd ibn Thabit (610–660) taught	Umar (579–644) second caliph taught	Abu Hurairah (603–681) taught
Alqama ibn Qays (died 681) taught	Husayn ibn Ali (626–680) taught	Qasim ibn Muhammad ibn Abi Bakr (657–725) taught and raised by Aisha	Urwah ibn Zubayr (died 713) taught by Aisha, he then taught	Said ibn al-Musayyib (637–715) taught	Abdullah ibn Umar (614–693) taught	Abd Allah ibn al-Zubayr (624–692) taught by Aisha, he then taught
Ibrahim al-Nakha’i taught	Ali ibn Husayn Zayn al-Abidin (659–712) taught	Hisham ibn Urwah (667–772) taught	Ibn Shihab al-Zuhri (died 741) taught	Salim ibn Abd-Allah ibn Umar taught	Umar ibn Abdul Aziz (682–720) raised and taught by Abdullah ibn Umar
Hammad ibn Abi Sulayman taught	Muhammad al-Baqir (676–733) taught	Farwah bint al-Qasim Jafar's mother
Abu Hanifa (699–767) wrote Al Fiqh Al Akbar and Kitab Al-Athar, jurisprudence followed by Sunni, Sunni Sufi, Barelvi, Deobandi, Zaidiyyah and originally by the Fatimid and taught	Zayd ibn Ali (695–740)	Ja'far bin Muhammad Al-Baqir (702–765) Muhammad and Ali's great great grand son, jurisprudence followed by Shia, he taught	Malik ibn Anas (711–795) wrote Muwatta, jurisprudence from early Medina period now mostly followed by Maliki Sunnis in North Africa, and taught	Al-Waqidi (748–822) wrote history books like Kitab al-Tarikh wa al-Maghazi, student of Malik ibn Anas	Abu Muhammad Abdullah ibn Abdul Hakam (died 829) wrote biographies and history books, student of Malik ibn Anas
Abu Yusuf (729–798) wrote Usul al-fiqh	Muhammad al-Shaybani (749–805)	al-Shafi‘i (767–820) wrote Al-Risala, jurisprudence followed by Shafi'i Sunnis and Sufis, and taught	Ismail ibn Ibrahim	Ali ibn al-Madini (778–849) wrote The Book of Knowledge of the Companions	Ibn Hisham (died 833) wrote early history and As-Sirah an-Nabawiyyah, Muhammad's biography
Isma'il ibn Ja'far (719–775)	Musa al-Kadhim (745–799)	Ahmad ibn Hanbal (780–855) wrote Musnad Ahmad ibn Hanbal jurisprudence followed by Hanbali Sunnis and Sufis	Muhammad al-Bukhari (810–870) wrote Sahih al-Bukhari hadith books	Muslim ibn al-Hajjaj (815–875) wrote Sahih Muslim hadith books	Dawud al-Zahiri (815–883/4) founded the Zahiri school	Muhammad ibn Isa at-Tirmidhi (824–892) wrote Jami` at-Tirmidhi hadith books	Al-Baladhuri (died 892) wrote early history Futuh al-Buldan, Genealogies of the Nobles
Ibn Majah (824–887) wrote Sunan ibn Majah hadith book	Abu Dawood (817–889) wrote Sunan Abu Dawood Hadith Book
Muhammad ibn Ya'qub al-Kulayni (864- 941) wrote Kitab al-Kafi hadith book followed by Twelver Shia	Muhammad ibn Jarir al-Tabari (838–923) wrote History of the Prophets and Kings, Tafsir al-Tabari	Abu al-Hasan al-Ash'ari (874–936) wrote Maqālāt al-islāmīyīn, Kitāb al-luma, Kitāb al-ibāna 'an usūl al-diyāna
Ibn Babawayh (923–991) wrote Man La Yahduruhu al-Faqih jurisprudence followed by Twelver Shia	Sharif Razi (930–977) wrote Nahj al-Balagha followed by Twelver Shia	Nasir al-Din al-Tusi (1201–1274) wrote jurisprudence books followed by Ismaili and Twelver Shia	Al-Ghazali (1058–1111) wrote The Niche for Lights, The Incoherence of the Philosophers, The Alchemy of Happiness on Sufism	Rumi (1207–1273) wrote Masnavi, Diwan-e Shams-e Tabrizi on Sufism
Key: Some of Muhammad's Companions	Key: Taught in Medina	Key: Taught in Iraq	Key: Worked in Syria	Key: Travelled extensively collecting the sayings of Muhammad and compiled books of hadith	Key: Worked in Persia

== See also ==
- List of biographies of Muhammad
