= Malik ibn Anas =

Muslim scholar and namesake of the Maliki school (711–795)

Imam Malik ibn Anas
- مَالِك بْن أَنَس
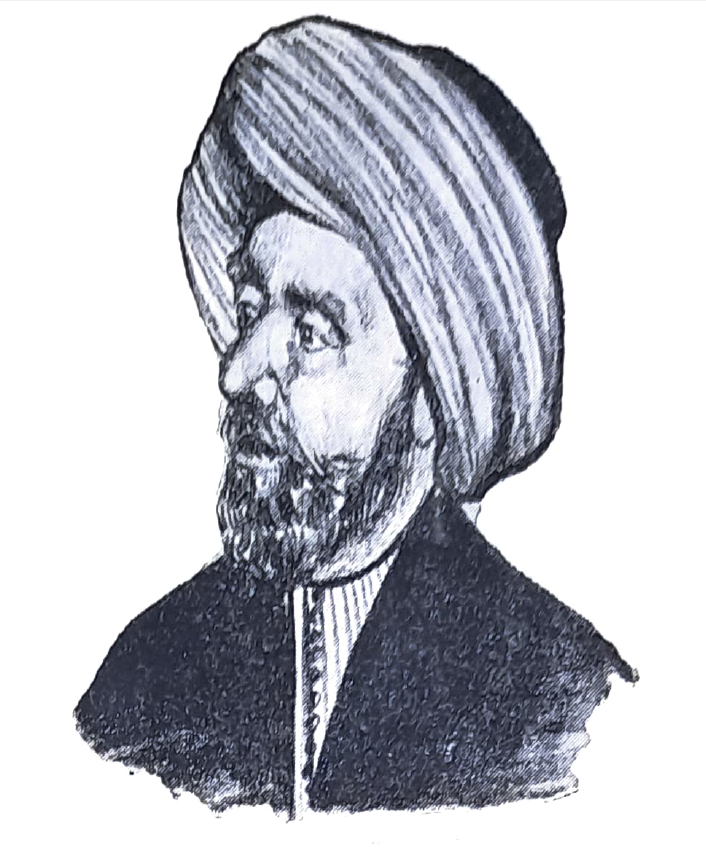
- A sketch representing Malik ibn Anas from a book entitled Sayr mulhimah: min al-Sharq wa-al-Gharb by unknown author, 1961
- Title: Shaykh al-Islam ('Shaykh of Islam'); Imām al-Aʾimmah (‘The Imam of Imams’); Dalīl al-Jamāʿah ('Proof of the Community'); Imām Ahl al-Madīnah ('Imam of Medina'); Amīr al-Muʾminin fi al-Hadīth (Imam of the Believers in Hadith); Imām Dār al-Hijrah ('Imam of the Abode of Emigration'); ʿĀlim al-Madīnah ('Knowledgeable Scholar of Medina')
- Official name: Mālik bin Anas bin Mālik bin Abī ʿĀmir bin ʿAmr bin Al-Ḥārith bin Ghaymān bin Khuthayn bin ʿAmr bin Al-Ḥārith al-Aṣbaḥī al-Ḥumyarī al-Madanī

Personal life
- Born: 711 CE (93 AH) Medina, Hejaz, Umayyad Caliphate (present-day Saudi Arabia)
- Died: 795 CE (179 AH; aged 83–84) Medina, Hejaz, Abbasid Caliphate (present-day Saudi Arabia)
- Resting place: Al-Baqi Cemetery, Medina, Hejaz, Saudi Arabia; 24°28′01″N 39°36′59″E
- Parents: Anas ibn Malik (not to be confused with Anas ibn Malik) (father); Aaliyah bint Shurayk al-Azdiyya (mother)
- Era: Late Umayyad – early Abbasid (Tabi' al-Tabi'in)
- Region: Hejaz, Arabia
- Main interests: Jurisprudence; Hadith; Theology
- Notable ideas: Maliki school; ʿAmal Ahl al-Madīnah (The practice of the people of Madinah)
- Notable work: Al-Muwatta'
- Occupation: Scholar; Jurist; Muhaddith

Religious life
- Religion: Islam
- Denomination: Sunni
- Jurisprudence: Independent (eponym of the Maliki school)

Muslim leader
- Influenced by: Ali ibn Husayn Zayn al-Abidin; Said ibn al-Musayyib; al-Nafi' al-Madani; Hisham ibn Urwa; Ibn Shihab al-Zuhri; The Seven Fuqaha of Medina; Rabee'ah al-Ra'y
- Influenced: Ibn Wahb; Ibn al-Qasim; Yahya ibn Yahya; Muhammad al-Shaybani; Abu Yusuf; Sahnun; Ibn Abi Zayd; Yusuf ibn abd al-Barr; Qadi Iyad; Al-Qurtubi; Shihab al-Din al-Qarafi; Al-Shafi’i; All Malikis
- Arabic name
- Personal (Ism): Mālik مَالِك
- Patronymic (Nasab): Ibn Anas ibn Mālik ibn Abī ʿĀmir ٱبْن أَنَس ٱبْن مَالِك ٱبْن أَبِي عَامِر
- Teknonymic (Kunya): Abū ʿAbdillāh أَبُو عَبْدِ ٱللَّٰه
- Toponymic (Nisba): Al-Asbahī al-Madanī ٱلْأَصْبَحِيّ ٱلْمَدَنِيّ

Malik ibn Anas (Arabic: مَالِك بْن أَنَس, romanized: Mālik ibn ʾAnas; c. 711–795) was a Muslim scholar, jurist, muhaddith and traditionalist who is the eponym of the Maliki school, one of the four schools of Islamic jurisprudence in Sunni Islam.

Born in Medina into the clan of Humayr which belonged to the Banu Taym of Quraysh, Malik studied under Hisham ibn Urwa, Ibn Shihab al-Zuhri, Ja'far al-Sadiq, Nafi ibn Sarjis and others. He rose to become the premier scholar of hadith in his day, Referred to as the Imam of Medina by his contemporaries, his views in matters of jurisprudence became highly cherished both in his own life and afterward, becoming the eponym of the Maliki school, one of the four major schools of Islamic jurisprudence. His school became the normative rite for Sunni practice in much of North Africa, al-Andalus (until the expulsion of medieval native Iberian Muslims), a vast portion of Egypt, some parts of Syria, Yemen, Sudan, Iraq, and Khorasan, and the prominent orders in Sufism, the Shadili and Tijani.

Perhaps Malik's most famous accomplishment in the annals of Islamic history is, however, his compilation of al-Muwatta', one of the oldest and most revered Sunni hadith collections and one of "the earliest surviving Muslim law-book[s]," in which Malik attempted to "give a survey of law and justice; ritual and practice of religion according to the consensus of Islam in Medina, according to the sunna usual in Medina; and to create a theoretical standard for matters which were not settled from the point of view of consensus and sunna." Composed in the early days of the Abbasid caliphate, during which time there was a burgeoning "recognition and appreciation of the canon law" of the ruling party, Malik's work aimed to trace out a "smoothed path" (which is what al-muwaṭṭaʾ literally means) through "the farreaching differences of opinion even on the most elementary questions." Hailed as "the soundest book on earth after the Quran" by al-Shafi'i, the compilation of al-Muwatta' led to Malik being bestowed with such reverential epithets as Shaykh al-Islam, Proof of the Community, Imam of the Believers in Hadith, Imam of the Abode of Emigration, and Knowledgeable Scholar of Medina in later Sunni tradition.

According to classical Sunni tradition, the Islamic prophet Muhammad foretold the birth of Malik, saying: "Very soon will people beat the flanks of camels in search of knowledge and they shall find no one more expert than the knowledgeable scholar of Medina," and, in another tradition, "The people ... shall set forth from East and West without finding a sage other than the sage of the people in Medina." While some later scholars, such as Ibn Hazm and al-Tahawi, did cast doubt on identifying the mysterious wise man of both these traditions with Malik, the most widespread interpretation nevertheless continued to be that which held the personage to be Malik. Throughout Islamic history, Malik has been venerated as an exemplary figure in all the traditional schools of Sunni thought, both by the exoteric ulema and by the mystics, with the latter often designating him as a saint in their hagiographies. Malik's most notable student, ash-Shafi'i (who would himself become the founder of another of the four orthodox legal schools of Sunni law), later said of his teacher: "No one constitutes as great a favor to me in the religion of God as Malik ... when the scholars of knowledge are mentioned, Malik is the star."

== Biography ==
Malik was born as the son of Anas ibn Malik (not the Sahabi with the same name) and Aaliyah bint Shurayk al-Azdiyya in Medina, c. 711. His family was originally from the al-Asbahi tribe of Yemen, but his great grandfather Abu 'Amir relocated the family to Medina after converting to Islam in the second year of the Hijri calendar, or 623 CE. His grandfather Malik ibn Abi Amir was a student of the second Caliph of Islam Umar and was one of those involved in the collection of the parchments upon which Quranic texts were originally written when those were collected during the Caliph Uthman era.

=== Teachers ===
Early Islamic scholars

Muhammad, The final Messenger of God (570–632) the Constitution of Medina, taught the Quran, and advised his companions
Abdullah ibn Masud (died 653) taught	Ali (607–661) fourth caliph taught	Aisha, Muhammad's wife and Abu Bakr's daughter taught	Abd Allah ibn Abbas (618–687) taught	Zayd ibn Thabit (610–660) taught	Umar (579–644) second caliph taught	Abu Hurairah (603–681) taught
Alqama ibn Qays (died 681) taught	Husayn ibn Ali (626–680) taught	Qasim ibn Muhammad ibn Abi Bakr (657–725) taught and raised by Aisha	Urwah ibn Zubayr (died 713) taught by Aisha, he then taught	Said ibn al-Musayyib (637–715) taught	Abdullah ibn Umar (614–693) taught	Abd Allah ibn al-Zubayr (624–692) taught by Aisha, he then taught
Ibrahim al-Nakha’i taught	Ali ibn Husayn Zayn al-Abidin (659–712) taught	Hisham ibn Urwah (667–772) taught	Ibn Shihab al-Zuhri (died 741) taught	Salim ibn Abd-Allah ibn Umar taught	Umar ibn Abdul Aziz (682–720) raised and taught by Abdullah ibn Umar
Hammad ibn Abi Sulayman taught	Muhammad al-Baqir (676–733) taught	Farwah bint al-Qasim Jafar's mother
Abu Hanifa (699–767) wrote Al Fiqh Al Akbar and Kitab Al-Athar, jurisprudence followed by Sunni, Sunni Sufi, Barelvi, Deobandi, Zaidiyyah and originally by the Fatimid and taught	Zayd ibn Ali (695–740)	Ja'far bin Muhammad Al-Baqir (702–765) Muhammad and Ali's great great grand son, jurisprudence followed by Shia, he taught	Malik ibn Anas (711–795) wrote Muwatta, jurisprudence from early Medina period now mostly followed by Maliki Sunnis in North Africa, and taught	Al-Waqidi (748–822) wrote history books like Kitab al-Tarikh wa al-Maghazi, student of Malik ibn Anas	Abu Muhammad Abdullah ibn Abdul Hakam (died 829) wrote biographies and history books, student of Malik ibn Anas
Abu Yusuf (729–798) wrote Usul al-fiqh	Muhammad al-Shaybani (749–805)	al-Shafi‘i (767–820) wrote Al-Risala, jurisprudence followed by Shafi'i Sunnis and Sufis, and taught	Ismail ibn Ibrahim	Ali ibn al-Madini (778–849) wrote The Book of Knowledge of the Companions	Ibn Hisham (died 833) wrote early history and As-Sirah an-Nabawiyyah, Muhammad's biography
Isma'il ibn Ja'far (719–775)	Musa al-Kadhim (745–799)	Ahmad ibn Hanbal (780–855) wrote Musnad Ahmad ibn Hanbal jurisprudence followed by Hanbali Sunnis and Sufis	Muhammad al-Bukhari (810–870) wrote Sahih al-Bukhari hadith books	Muslim ibn al-Hajjaj (815–875) wrote Sahih Muslim hadith books	Dawud al-Zahiri (815–883/4) founded the Zahiri school	Muhammad ibn Isa at-Tirmidhi (824–892) wrote Jami` at-Tirmidhi hadith books	Al-Baladhuri (died 892) wrote early history Futuh al-Buldan, Genealogies of the Nobles
Ibn Majah (824–887) wrote Sunan ibn Majah hadith book	Abu Dawood (817–889) wrote Sunan Abu Dawood Hadith Book
Muhammad ibn Ya'qub al-Kulayni (864- 941) wrote Kitab al-Kafi hadith book followed by Twelver Shia	Muhammad ibn Jarir al-Tabari (838–923) wrote History of the Prophets and Kings, Tafsir al-Tabari	Abu al-Hasan al-Ash'ari (874–936) wrote Maqālāt al-islāmīyīn, Kitāb al-luma, Kitāb al-ibāna 'an usūl al-diyāna
Ibn Babawayh (923–991) wrote Man La Yahduruhu al-Faqih jurisprudence followed by Twelver Shia	Sharif Razi (930–977) wrote Nahj al-Balagha followed by Twelver Shia	Nasir al-Din al-Tusi (1201–1274) wrote jurisprudence books followed by Ismaili and Twelver Shia	Al-Ghazali (1058–1111) wrote The Niche for Lights, The Incoherence of the Philosophers, The Alchemy of Happiness on Sufism	Rumi (1207–1273) wrote Masnavi, Diwan-e Shams-e Tabrizi on Sufism
Key: Some of Muhammad's Companions	Key: Taught in Medina	Key: Taught in Iraq	Key: Worked in Syria	Key: Travelled extensively collecting the sayings of Muhammad and compiled books of hadith	Key: Worked in Persia

Living in Medina gave Malik access to some of the most learned minds of early Islam. He memorized the Quran in his youth, learning recitation from Abu Suhail Nafi' ibn 'Abd ar-Rahman, from whom he also received his Ijazah, or certification and permission to teach others. He studied under various famed scholars including Hisham ibn Urwah and Ibn Shihab al-Zuhri as well as the famed Imam Jafar al-Sadiq.

Both Malik and al Zuhri were student to Nafi Mawla Ibn Umar, prestigious Tabi'un Imam and freed slave of Abdullah ibn Umar.

Imam Malik, studied also with Imam Jafar a well-known scholar of his time, although primarily influenced by other Fuqaha, like Nafi’.

Imam Malik was a teacher of Imam Shafi, who in turn was a teacher of Imam Ahmad ibn Hanbal.

Imam Malik inherited his knowledge from the seven jurists of Madinah, known as Fuqahā’ al-Sab‘ah:

1. Ubaydullah ibn 'Abdullah ibn 'Utbah ibn Mas'ud
2. 'Urwah ibn al-Zubayr
3. Al-Qasim ibn Muhammad ibn 'Abi Bakr al-Siddiq
4. Sa-id ibn al-Mussayib
5. Abū Bakr ibn ʿAbd al-Raḥmān ibn al-Ḥārith ibn Hishām
6. Sulaymān ibn Yasār
7. Khārijah ibn Zayd ibn Thābit

=== Golden Chain of Narration ===
Malik's chain of narrators was considered the most authentic and called Silsilat al-Dhahab or "The Golden Chain of Narrators" by notable hadith scholars including Muhammad al-Bukhari. The 'Golden Chain' of narration (i.e., that considered by the scholars of Hadith to be the most authentic) consists of Malik, who narrated from Nafi‘ Mawla ibn ‘Umar, who narrated from Ibn Umar, who narrated from Muhammad.

== Views ==
=== Theology ===
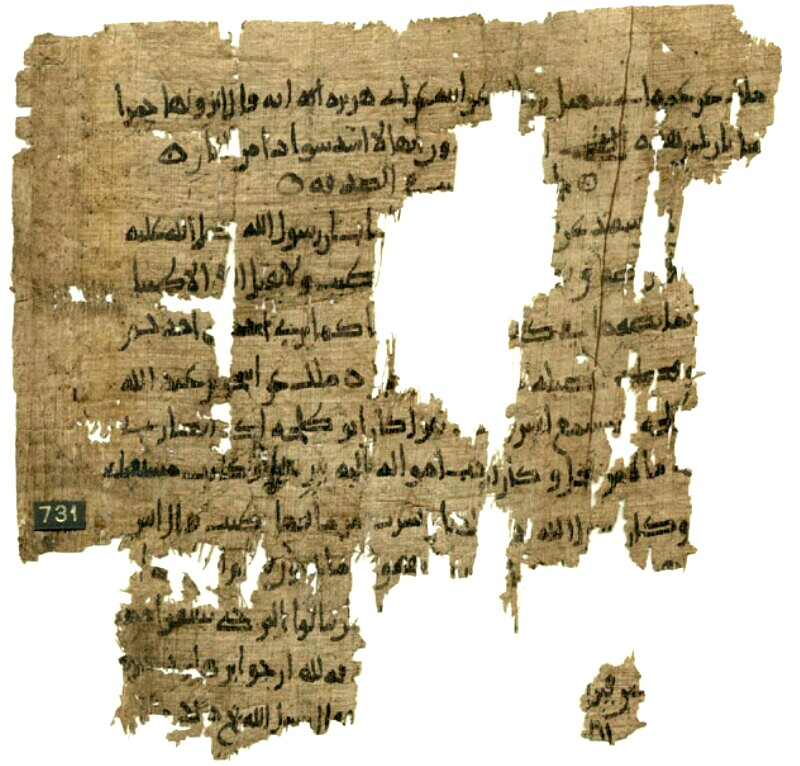
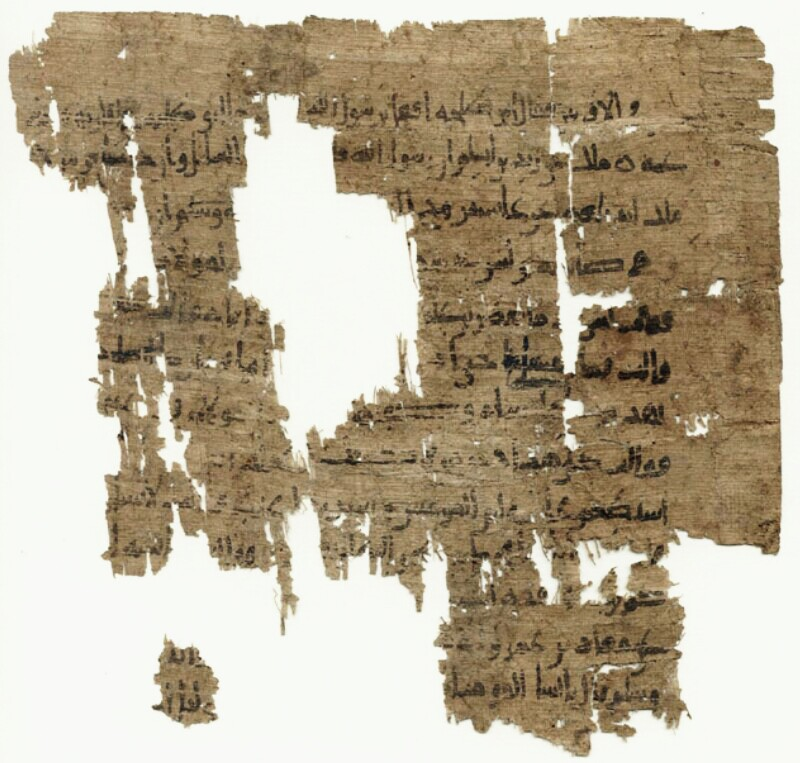
PERF No. 731, the earliest manuscript of Mālik's Muwaṭṭaʾ, dated to his own time. Recto (left) has the contents of Bāb al-Targib fī-Sadaqah, 795 AD.

Abdul-Ghani Ad-Daqr wrote that Malik was 'the furthest of all people' from dialectic theology who was the most knowledgeable of their discussions without accepting their views. G.F. Haddad, on the other hand, argued that Malik was not completely averse to the idea of dialectic theology; on the contrary, Haddad points to Malik having studied 'at the feet of Ibn Hurmuz', a master in dialectic theology, for 'thirteen to sixteen years'.

==== Anthropomorphism ====
Malik's unique contributions to the field of theology specifically is that he was a strict opponent of anthropomorphism, and deemed it absurd to compare the attributes of God, with those of man. For example, when a man asked Malik about the meaning of Quran 20:5, "The Merciful made istiwa over the Throne," it is related that "nothing affected Malik so much as that man's question," and the jurist fervently responded: "The 'how' of it is unknown; the istiwa part is acknowledged; belief in it is obligatory; asking about it is an innovation."

==== Beatific vision ====
Malik was a supporter of the orthodox Sunni doctrine of the beatific vision, and he is said to have cited Quran 75:22-23 ("That day will faces be resplendent, looking toward their Lord,") and 83:15 ("Nay! Verily, from their Lord, that day, shall they [the transgressors] be veiled,") as proof of his belief.

==== Faith's nature ====
When he was asked about the nature of faith, Malik defined it as "speech and works" (qawlun wa-'amal), which shows that Malik was averse to the rigorous separation of faith and works.

==== Intercession ====
Malik seems to have been a proponent of intercession in personal supplication. For example, it is related that when the Abbasid caliph al-Mansur asked Malik about whether it was preferable to face the Prophet's tomb or the qibla whilst doing the personal prayer or dua, Malik responded: "Why should you not face him when he is your means (wasīla) to God and that of your father Adam on the Day of Resurrection?" Regarding this tradition, the thirteenth-century hadith master Ibn Jamāʿa said: "The report is related by the two hadith masters Ibn Bashkuwāl and al-Qāḍī ʿIyāḍ in al-Shifā, and no attention is paid to the words of those who claim that it is forged purely on the basis of their idle desires." Historically, it is known that Malik's statements on the validity of intercession remained a core doctrine of the Maliki school, and practically all Maliki thinkers of the classical era accepted the idea of the Prophet's intercession. It is also known, moreover, that the classical "books of the Mālikīs are replete with the stipulation that du'ā [personal supplication] be made while facing the grave."

==== Mysticism ====
On the basis of several early traditions, it is evident that Malik held the early Sufis and their practices in high regard. It is related, moreover, that Malik was a strong proponent of combining the "inward science" ('ilm al-bātin) of mystical knowledge with the "outward science" of jurisprudence. For example, the famous twelfth-century Maliki jurist and judge Qadi Iyad, later venerated as a saint throughout the Iberian Peninsula, narrated a tradition in which a man asked Malik "about something in the inward science," to which Malik replied: "Truly none knows the inward science except those who know the outward science! When he knows the outward science and puts it into practice, God shall open for him the inward science - and that will not take place except by the opening of his heart and its enlightenment." While there are a few traditions relating that Malik, while not an opponent of mysticism as a whole, was nonetheless adverse specifically to the practice of group dhikr, such traditions have been graded as being munkar or "weak" in their chain of transmission. Furthermore, it has been argued that none of these reports - all of which relate Malik's disapproving amusement at being told about an instance of group dhikr happening nearby - explicitly display any disapproval of the act as such, but rather serve as a criticism of "some people who passed for Sufis in his time [who] apparently committed certain excesses or breaches of the sacred law." As both their chains of transmission are weak and not consistent with what is related of Malik elsewhere, the traditions are rejected by many scholars, although latter-day critics of Sufism do occasionally cite them in support of their position.

=== Relics ===
Malik was a supporter of tabarruk or the "seeking of blessing through [the veneration of] relics." This is evident, for example, in the fact that Malik approvingly related the tradition of Atā' ibn Abī Rabāh, whom he saw "enter the [Prophet's] Mosque, then take hold of the pommel of the Pulpit, after which he faced the qibla [to pray]," thereby supporting the holding of the pommel for its blessings (baraka) by virtue of its having touched Muhammad. Furthermore, it is also recorded that "when one of the caliphs manifested his intention to replace the wooden pulpit of the Prophet with a pulpit of silver and jewels," Malik exclaimed: "I do not consider it good that people be deprived of the relics of the Messenger of God!" (Lā arā yuḥrama al-nāsu āthāra rasūlillāh).

=== Sunnah of Muhammad ===
Malik considered following the sunnah of Muhammad to be of capital importance for every Muslim. It is reported that he said: "The sunnah is Noah's Ark. Whoever boards it is saved, and whoever remains away from it perishes."

=== Ethics ===
==== Differences of opinion ====
Accounts of Malik's life demonstrate that the scholar cherished differences of opinion amongst the ulema as a mercy from God to the Islamic community. Even "in Malik's time there were those who forwarded the idea of a unified madhhab and the ostensive removal of all differences between the Sunni schools of law," with "three successive caliphs" having sought to "impose the Muwatta and Malik's school upon the entire Islamic world of their time," but "Malik refused to allow it every time ... [for he held that the differences in opinion among the jurists]" were a "mercy" for the people. When the second Abbasid caliph al-Mansur said to Malik: "I want to unify this knowledge. I shall write to the leaders of the armies and to the rulers so that they make it law, and whoever contravenes it shall be put to death," Malik is said to have responded: "Commander of the Believers, there is another way. Truly, the Prophet was present in this community, he used to send out troops or set forth in person, and he did not conquer many lands until God took back his soul. Then Abu Bakr arose and he also did not conquer many lands. Then Umar arose after the two of them and many lands were conquered at his hands. As a result, he faced the necessity of sending out the companions of Muhammad as teachers and people did not cease to take from them, notable scholars from notable scholars until our time. If you now go and change them from what they know to what they do not know they shall deem it disbelief (kufr). Rather, confirm the people of each land with regard to whatever knowledge is there, and take this knowledge to yourself."

According to another narration, al-Mansur, after hearing Malik's answers to certain important questions, said: "I have resolved to give the order that your writings be copied and disseminated to every Muslim region on earth, so that they be put in practice exclusively of any other rulings. They will leave aside innovations and keep only this knowledge. For I consider that the source of knowledge is the narrative tradition of Medina and the knowledge of its scholars." To this, Malik is said to have replied: "Commander of the Believers, do not! For people have already heard different positions, heard hadith, and related narrations. Every group has taken whatever came to them and put it into practice, conforming to it while other people differed. To take them away from what they have been professing will cause a disaster. Therefore, leave people with whatever school they follow and whatever the people of each country chose for themselves."

==== Knowing the limits of knowledge ====
Malik is famous for declaring: "The shield of the 'alim is: 'I do not know.' If he neglects it, he will receive a mortal blow." Elsewhere, a certain Khālid ibn Khidāsh related: "I travelled all the way from Iraq to see Mālik about forty questions. He did not answer me except on five. Then he said: ʿIbn ʿIjlān used to say: If the 'alim bypasses 'I do not know,' he will receive a mortal blow." Likewise, al-Haytham ibn Jamīl said: "I saw Mālik ibn Anas being asked forty-eight questions, and he replied to thirty-two of them: 'I do not know.'" Later on, Malik's disciple, Ibn Wahb, related: "I heard ʿAbd Allāh ibn Yazīd ibn Hurmuz say: 'The 'ulema must instill in those who sit with him the phrase 'I do not know' until it becomes a foundational principle (asl) before them and they seek refuge in it from danger."

==== Religious disputation ====
Malik is said to have detested disputing in matters of religion, saying: "Disputation (al-jidāl) in the religion fosters self-display, does away with the light of the heart and hardens it, and produces aimless wandering." Needless argument, therefore, was disapproved of by Malik, and he also chose to keep silent about religious matters in general unless he felt obliged to speak in fear of "the spread of misguidance or some similar danger."

=== Social ===
==== Shaving the moustache ====
Elsewhere, it is written that he "detested and condemned" shaving of the mustache and, furthermore, "disliked inordinate length for the beard." While several other scholars held both the clipping (qass) and the removal (ihfā') of the mustache to be sunnah,

== Physical appearance ==
The available physical descriptions of Malik relate that he "was tall, heavy-set, imposing of stature, very fair, with white beard ... [and] bald ... [with] blue eyes." Furthermore, it is also related that "he always wore beautiful clothes, especially [those that were] white."

== Death ==
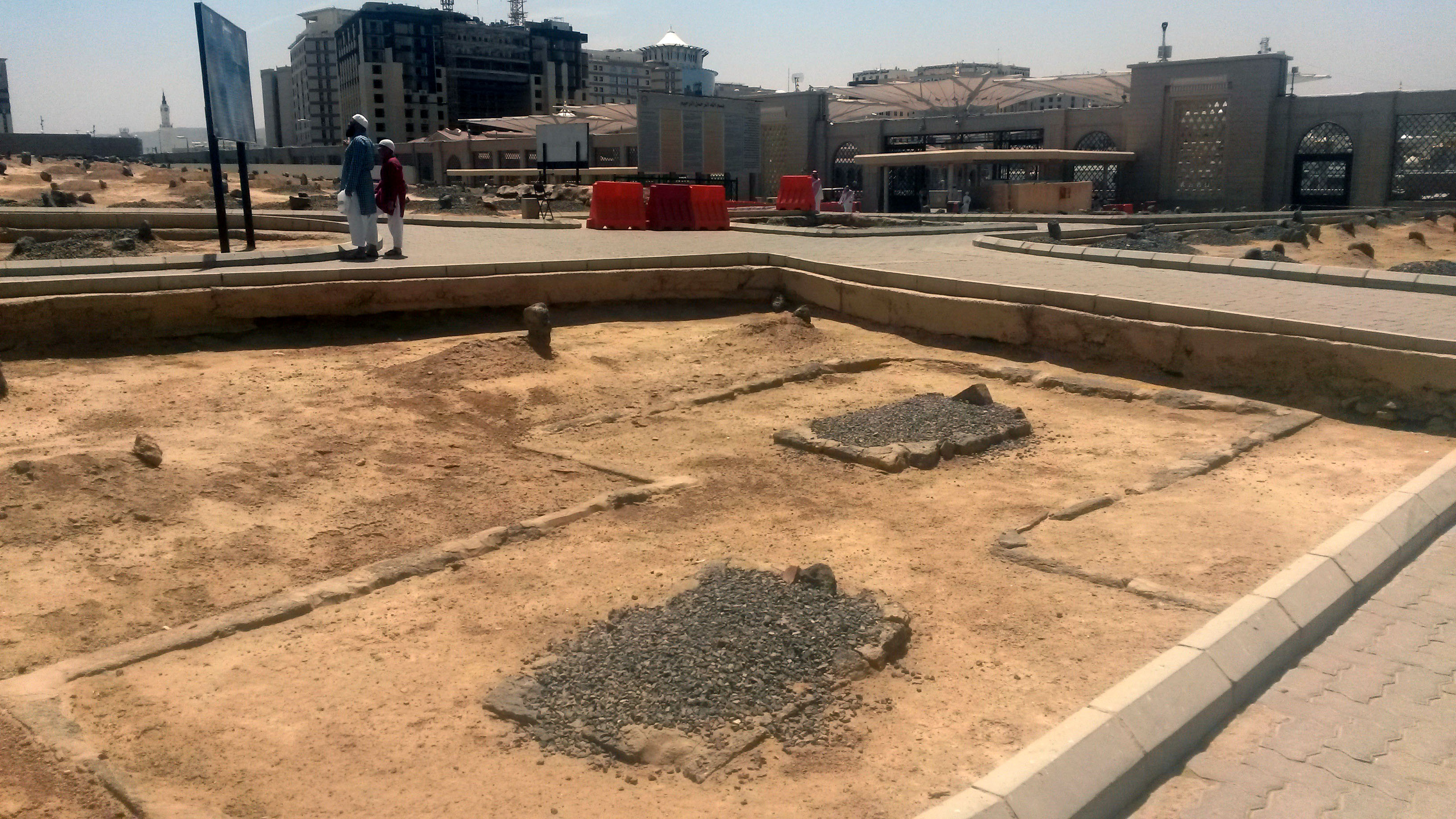
Final resting place of Malik at Al-Baqi Cemetery, Medina

Imam Malik Ibn Anas died at the age of 83 or 84 in Medina in 795 CE, and is buried in the cemetery of Al-Baqi', across from the Mosque of the Prophet. Although there was a small shrine constructed around his grave during the late medieval period, with many Muslims visiting it to pay their respects, the construction was razed to the ground by the Kingdom of Saudi Arabia during their campaign of demolishing many of the traditional Islamic heritage sites after the kingdom's establishment in 1932.

Malik's last words were related to one Isma'il ibn Abi Uways who said, "Malik became sick, so I asked some of our people about what he said at the time of his death. They said, "He recited the testification of faith and then he recited:

To Allah belongs the command [i.e., decree] before and after.

Abbasid governor of Mecca and Medina, Abdallah al-Zaynabi led the prayers at the funeral of Malik ibn Anas in 795.

== Works ==
Imam Malik wrote:

- Al-Muwatta, one of the earlier Hadith collections.
- Al-Mudawwana al-Kubra, written down by Sahnun ibn Sa'id ibn Habib at-Tanukhi (c. 776-7 – 854–5) after the death of Malik ibn Anas.

== See also ==
- Salaf
  - Tabi' al-Tabi'in
- The Seven Fuqaha of Medina

== Bibliography ==
- Ibn Anas, Malik (2008). Al-Muwatta Of Iman Malik Ibn Anas. Taylor and francis. pp. 3, 4, 10, 14, 16, 17, 27, 29, 32, 37, 38, 49, 51, 58, 61, 67, 68, 74, 78, 87, 92, 93, 108, 114, 124, 128, 138, 139, 151, 156, 161, 171, 196, 210, 239, 245, 253, 312, 349, 410, 412. ISBN 9781136150982. 9789791142199.
- Khallikan, Ibnu (1843). Kitab Wafayat Ala'yan. Ibn Khallikan's Biographical Dictionary. Vol. 3. Translated by Bn Mac-Gluckin de Slane. Paris: Benjamin Duprat.
- Yarshater, Ehsan, ed. (1985–2007). The History of al-Ṭabarī (40 vols). SUNY Series in Near Eastern Studies. Albany, New York: State University of New York Press. ISBN 978-0-7914-7249-1.
