= Al-Tirmidhi =

Islamic hadith scholar (824–892)

Imam Al-Tirmidhi
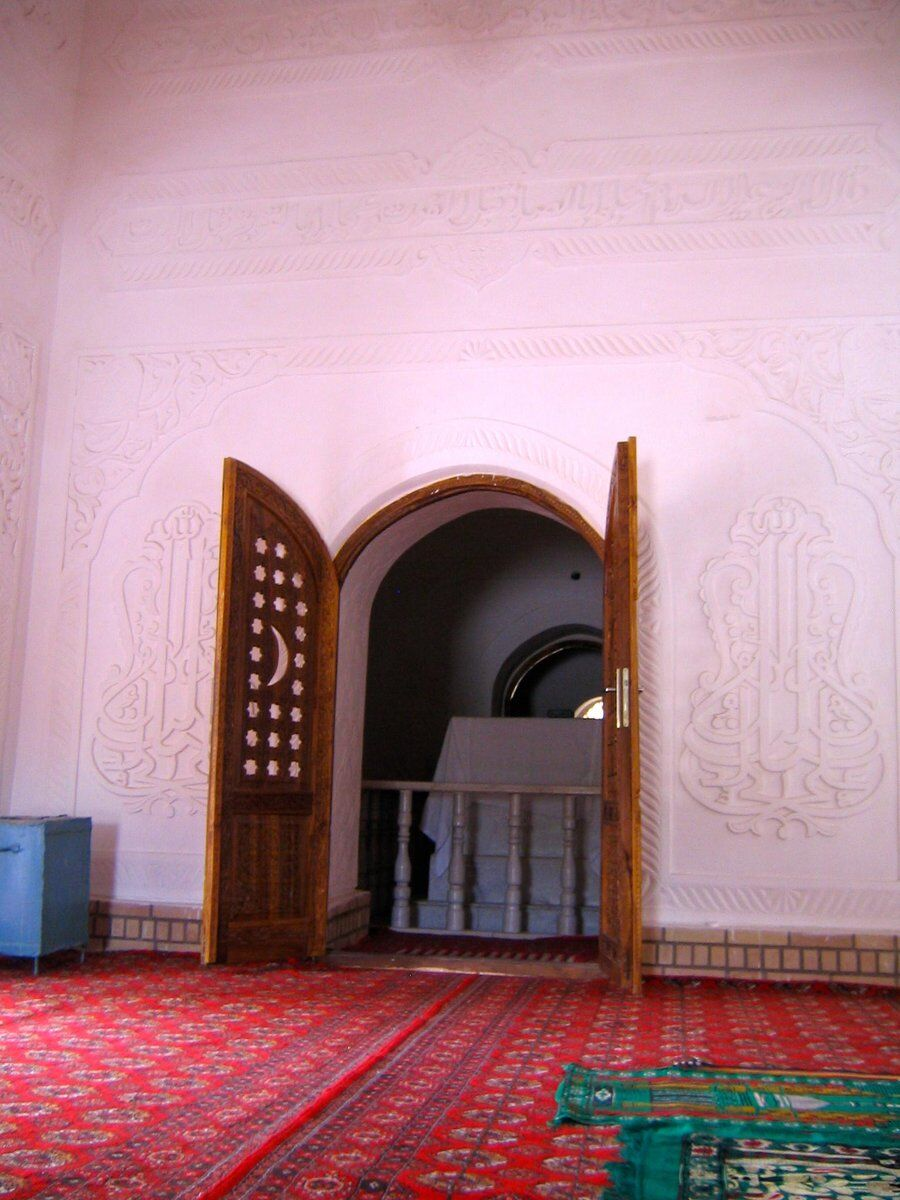
- Grave of Isa al-Tirmidhi inside his Tomb, near Amu Darya River, Termez, Uzbekistan

Personal life
- Born: 824 / 209 AH Termez, Abbasid Caliphate
- Died: 9 October 892/ 13 Rajab 279 AH (aged 70) Termez, Abbasid Caliphate
- Era: Islamic golden age
- Region: Abbasid Caliphate
- Main interest: Hadith
- Notable work(s): Jami at-Tirmidhi; Shama'il Muhammadiyah

Religious life
- Religion: Islam
- Denomination: Sunni
- Lineage: Banu Sulaym
- Creed: Athari

Muslim leader
- Influenced by: Muhammad al-Bukhari

Muhammad ibn Isa al-Tirmidhi (Arabic: محمد بن عيسى الترمذي, romanized: Muḥammad ibn ʿĪsā al-Tirmidhī; 824 – 9 October 892 CE / 209–279 AH), commonly known as Imam al-Tirmidhi or Abū ʿĪsā al-Tirmidhī, was a Muslim scholar and hadith collector from Termez in historical Greater Khorasan, in present-day Uzbekistan. He is principally known as the compiler of al-Jāmiʿ al-Ṣaḥīḥ, more commonly called Jāmiʿ al-Tirmidhī, one of the six canonical hadith collections of Sunni Islam.

Al-Tirmidhi's Jāmiʿ, sometimes also designated a Ṣaḥīḥ, contains traditions concerning Islamic law as well as substantial material on religion and theology. In compiling it, he paid particular attention both to the reliability of the isnād, or chain of transmission, and to the content of individual traditions. Consequently, the collection is shorter and less repetitive than the corresponding collections of al-Bukhārī and Muslim. He also wrote the Shamāʾil al-Muḥammadiyya, commonly known as Shamāʾil al-Tirmidhī, a collection of hadith concerning the person and character of the Islamic prophet Muhammad.

Al-Tirmidhi was also well versed in Arabic grammar and preferred the grammatical school of Kufa to that of Basra, in part because the Kufan tradition preserved Arabic poetry as a primary linguistic source. Very little is otherwise known about his life, except that he was either born blind or became blind later in life.

== Biography ==
=== Name and lineage ===
Al-Tirmidhi's given name (ism) was "Muhammad" while his kunya was "Abu `Isa" ("father of `Isa"). His genealogy is uncertain; his nasab (patronymic) has variously been given as:

- Muḥammad ibn ‛Īsá ibn Sawrah (محمد بن عيسى بن سورة)
- Muḥammad ibn ‛Īsá ibn Sawrah ibn Mūsá ibn aḍ-Ḍaḥḥāk (محمد بن عيسى بن سورة بن موسى بن الضحاك)
- Muḥammad ibn ‛Īsá ibn Sawrah ibn Shaddād (محمد بن عيسى بن سورة بن شداد)
- Muḥammad ibn ‛Īsá ibn Sawrah ibn Shaddād ibn aḍ-Ḍaḥḥāk (محمد بن عيسى بن سورة بن شداد بن الضحاك)
- Muḥammad ibn ‛Īsá ibn Sawrah ibn Shaddād ibn ‛Īsá (محمد بن عيسى بن سورة بن شداد بن عيسى)
- Muḥammad ibn ‛Īsá ibn Yazīd ibn Sawrah ibn as-Sakan (محمد بن عيسى بن يزيد بن سورة بن السكن)
- Muḥammad ibn ‛Īsá ibn Sahl (محمد بن عيسى بن سهل)
- Muḥammad ibn ‛Īsá ibn Sahl ibn Sawrah (محمد بن عيسى بن سهل بن سورة)
- Muhammad ibn 'Isa ibn Sawra ibn Shaddad ibn al-Dahhak al-Sulami al-Bughi al-Tirmidhi

He was also known by the laqab "ad-Darir" ("the Blind"). It has been said that he was born blind, but the majority of scholars agree that he became blind later in his life.

At-Tirmidhi's grandfather was originally from Marw (Persian: Merv), but moved to Tirmidh. According to Britannica Online, he was an Arab. According to S.H. Nasr and M. Mutahhari in The Cambridge History of Iran, Al-Tirmidhi was of Persian ethnicity. His uncle was the famous Sufi Abu Bakr al-Warraq. Al-Warraq was the teacher of Al-Hakim al-Samarqandi, a known associate of the famous theologian Abu Mansur Al-Maturidi.

=== Birth ===
Muhammad ibn `Isa at-Tirmidhi was born during the reign of the Abbasid caliph al-Ma'mun. His year of birth has been reported as 209 AH (824/825). Adh-Dhahabi only states that at-Tirmidhi was born near the year 210 AH (825/826), thus some sources give his year of birth as 210 AH. Some sources indicate that he was born in Mecca (Siddiqi says he was born in Mecca in 206 AH (821/822)) while others say he was born in Tirmidh (Persian: Termez), in what is now southern Uzbekistan. The stronger opinion is that he was born in Tirmidh. Specifically, he was born in one of its suburbs, the village of Bugh (hence the nisbats "at-Tirmidhi" and "al-Bughi").

=== Hadith studies ===
At-Tirmidhi began the study of hadith at the age of 20. From the year 235 AH (849/850) he traveled widely in Khurasan, Iraq, and the Hijaz in order to collect hadith. His teachers and those he narrated from included:

- al-Bukhari
- Abū Rajā’ Qutaybah ibn Sa‘īd al-Balkhī al-Baghlāni
- ‘Alī ibn Ḥujr ibn Iyās as-Sa‘dī al-Marwazī
- Muḥammad ibn Bashshār al-Baṣrī
- ‘Abd Allāh ibn Mu‘āwiyah al-Jumaḥī al-Baṣrī
- Abū Muṣ‘ab az-Zuhrī al-Madanī
- Muḥammad ibn ‘Abd al-Mālik ibn Abī ash-Shawārib al-Umawī al-Baṣrī
- Ismā‘īl ibn Mūsá al-Fazārī al-Kūfi
- Muḥammad ibn Abī Ma‘shar as-Sindī al-Madanī
- Abū Kurayb Muḥammad ibn al-‘Alā’ al-Kūfī
- Hanād ibn al-Sarī al-Kūfī
- Ibrāhīm ibn ‘Abd Allāh al-Harawī
- Suwayd ibn Naṣr ibn Suwayd al-Marwazī
- Muḥammad ibn Mūsā al-Baṣrī
- Zayd ibn Akhzam al-Baṣrī
- al-‘Abbās al-‘Anbarī al-Baṣrī
- Muḥammad ibn al-Muthanná al-Baṣrī
- Muḥammad ibn Ma‘mar al-Baṣrī
- ad-Darimi
- Muslim
- Abu Dawud

At the time, Khurasan, at-Tirmidhi's native land, was a major center of learning, being home to a large number of muhaddiths. Other major centers of learning visited by at-Tirmidhi were the Iraqi cities of Kufa and Basra. At-Tirmidhi reported hadith from 42 Kufan teachers. In his Jami`, he used more reports from Kufan teachers than from teachers of any other town.

At-Tirmidhi was a pupil of al-Bukhari, who was based in Khurasan. Adh-Dhahabi wrote, "His knowledge of hadith came from al-Bukhari." At-Tirmidhi mentioned al-Bukhari's name 114 times in his Jami`. He used al-Bukhari's Kitab at-Tarikh as a source when mentioning discrepancies in the text of a hadith or its transmitters, and praised al-Bukhari as being the most knowledgeable person in Iraq or Khurasan in the science of discrepancies of hadith. When mentioning the rulings of jurists, he followed al-Bukhari's practice of not mentioning the name of Abu Hanifah. Because he never received a reliable chain of narrators to mention Abu Hanifa's decrees, he would instead attribute them to "some people of Kufa." Al-Bukhari held at-Tirmidhi in high regard as well. He is reported to have told at-Tirmidhi, "I have profited more from you than you have from me," and in his Sahih he narrated two hadith from at-Tirmidhi.

At-Tirmidhi also narrated some hadiths from Abu Dawud, and one from Muslim. Muslim also narrated one hadith from at-Tirmidhi in his own Sahih.

A.J. Wensinck mentions Ahmad ibn Hanbal as among at-Tirmidhi's teachers. However, Hoosen states that according to the most reliable sources, at-Tirmidhi never went to Baghdad, nor did he attend any lectures of Ahmad ibn Hanbal. Furthermore, at-Tirmidhi never directly narrates from Ahmad ibn Hanbal in his Jami`.

Several of at-Tirmidhi's teachers also taught al-Bukhari, Muslim, Abu Dawud, Ibn Majah, and an-Nasa'i.

=== Writings ===
- Al-Jami' al-Mukhtasar min as-Sunan 'an Rasul Allah, known as Jami' at-Tirmidhi
- Al-'Ilal as-Sughra
- Az-Zuhd
- Al-'Ilal al-Kubra
- Ash-Shama'il an-Nabawiyya wa'l-Fada'il al-Mustafawiyya
- Al-Asma' wa'l-Kuna
- Kitab at-Tarikh

He is also reported to have a work on Islamic history and an exegesis of the Qur’an, but these are extinct.

== Accusation of heresy ==
It is argued that al-Tirmidhi was accused of being a Jahmi heretic and was harshly criticized by some Hanbali followers, including Abu Bakr al-Khallal (d. 311/923) in his Kitab al-Sunna (Book of the Prophetic Tradition), because he rejected a narration attributed to Mujahid ibn Jabr concerning the explanation of the verse 79 from Surat al-Isra' in the Qur'an about the praiseworthy station of Muhammad known as "al-Maqam al-Mahmud", describing it as a historical example of fanaticism.

The verse is: "And from [part of] the night, pray (Note: Literally, "arise from sleep for prayer.") with it [i.e., recitation of the Qur’ān] as additional [worship] for you; it is expected that (Note: This is a promise from Allāh to Muhammad.) your Lord will resurrect you to a praised station." (Note: The position of intercession by permission of Allāh and the highest degree in Paradise.)^{[Quran 17:79 -Sahih International]}

The Hanbalites interpreted the Praiseworthy Station as the seating of Muhammad on the Throne next to Allah, despite the controversy between those who render it weak and those who render it reliable.

However, the context of the historical sources of the incident allow for the possibility that this was not the author of the Sunan al-Tirmidhi; rather, he was another person who lived in Baghdad, sharing the same nisba (as many others, like al-Hakim al-Tirmidhi), based on the distinct attributes mentioned, such as obscurity in name and scholarship history, his abuse of the teachers of the author of the Sunan al-Tirmidhi and the hadith narrators, and his different theology, which seem to contradict with his traits.

== Death ==
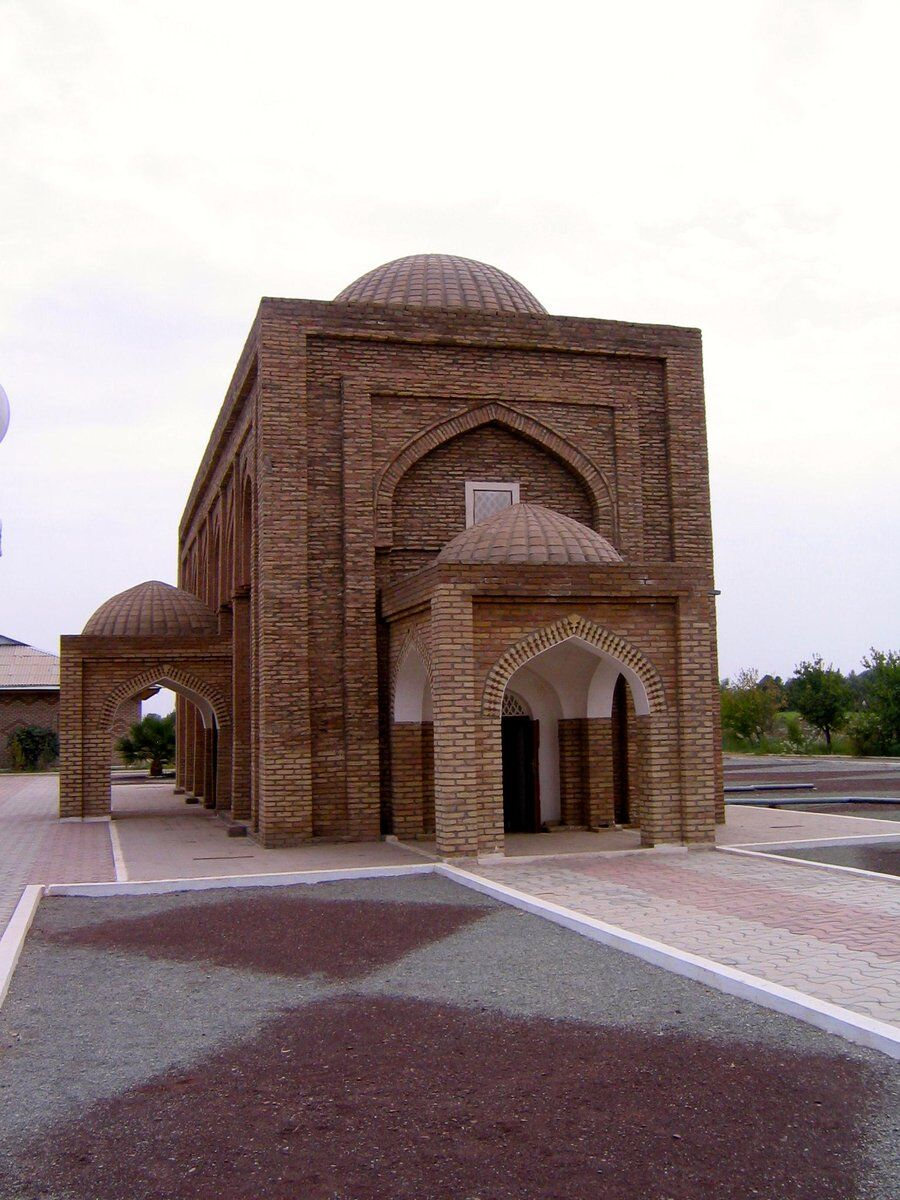
Tomb of Abu Isa al-Tirmidhi, near Amu Darya River, Termez, Uzbekistan. (2006)

At-Tirmidhi became blind in the last two years of his life, according to adh-Dhahabi. His blindness is said to have been the consequence of excessive weeping, either due to fear of God or over the death of al-Bukhari.

He died on Monday night, 13 Rajab 279 AH (Sunday night, 8 October 892) (Note: In the Islamic calendar, the weekday begins at sunset.) in Bugh.

At-Tirmidhi is buried on the outskirts of Sherobod, 60 kilometers north of Termez in Uzbekistan. In Termez he is locally known as Abu Isa at-Termezi or "Termez Ota" ("Father of Termez").

== See also ==
- Al-Tabari

== Early Islam scholars ==
Early Islamic scholars

Muhammad, The final Messenger of God (570–632) the Constitution of Medina, taught the Quran, and advised his companions
Abdullah ibn Masud (died 653) taught	Ali (607–661) fourth caliph taught	Aisha, Muhammad's wife and Abu Bakr's daughter taught	Abd Allah ibn Abbas (618–687) taught	Zayd ibn Thabit (610–660) taught	Umar (579–644) second caliph taught	Abu Hurairah (603–681) taught
Alqama ibn Qays (died 681) taught	Husayn ibn Ali (626–680) taught	Qasim ibn Muhammad ibn Abi Bakr (657–725) taught and raised by Aisha	Urwah ibn Zubayr (died 713) taught by Aisha, he then taught	Said ibn al-Musayyib (637–715) taught	Abdullah ibn Umar (614–693) taught	Abd Allah ibn al-Zubayr (624–692) taught by Aisha, he then taught
Ibrahim al-Nakha’i taught	Ali ibn Husayn Zayn al-Abidin (659–712) taught	Hisham ibn Urwah (667–772) taught	Ibn Shihab al-Zuhri (died 741) taught	Salim ibn Abd-Allah ibn Umar taught	Umar ibn Abdul Aziz (682–720) raised and taught by Abdullah ibn Umar
Hammad ibn Abi Sulayman taught	Muhammad al-Baqir (676–733) taught	Farwah bint al-Qasim Jafar's mother
Abu Hanifa (699–767) wrote Al Fiqh Al Akbar and Kitab Al-Athar, jurisprudence followed by Sunni, Sunni Sufi, Barelvi, Deobandi, Zaidiyyah and originally by the Fatimid and taught	Zayd ibn Ali (695–740)	Ja'far bin Muhammad Al-Baqir (702–765) Muhammad and Ali's great great grand son, jurisprudence followed by Shia, he taught	Malik ibn Anas (711–795) wrote Muwatta, jurisprudence from early Medina period now mostly followed by Maliki Sunnis in North Africa, and taught	Al-Waqidi (748–822) wrote history books like Kitab al-Tarikh wa al-Maghazi, student of Malik ibn Anas	Abu Muhammad Abdullah ibn Abdul Hakam (died 829) wrote biographies and history books, student of Malik ibn Anas
Abu Yusuf (729–798) wrote Usul al-fiqh	Muhammad al-Shaybani (749–805)	al-Shafi‘i (767–820) wrote Al-Risala, jurisprudence followed by Shafi'i Sunnis and Sufis, and taught	Ismail ibn Ibrahim	Ali ibn al-Madini (778–849) wrote The Book of Knowledge of the Companions	Ibn Hisham (died 833) wrote early history and As-Sirah an-Nabawiyyah, Muhammad's biography
Isma'il ibn Ja'far (719–775)	Musa al-Kadhim (745–799)	Ahmad ibn Hanbal (780–855) wrote Musnad Ahmad ibn Hanbal jurisprudence followed by Hanbali Sunnis and Sufis	Muhammad al-Bukhari (810–870) wrote Sahih al-Bukhari hadith books	Muslim ibn al-Hajjaj (815–875) wrote Sahih Muslim hadith books	Dawud al-Zahiri (815–883/4) founded the Zahiri school	Muhammad ibn Isa at-Tirmidhi (824–892) wrote Jami` at-Tirmidhi hadith books	Al-Baladhuri (died 892) wrote early history Futuh al-Buldan, Genealogies of the Nobles
Ibn Majah (824–887) wrote Sunan ibn Majah hadith book	Abu Dawood (817–889) wrote Sunan Abu Dawood Hadith Book
Muhammad ibn Ya'qub al-Kulayni (864- 941) wrote Kitab al-Kafi hadith book followed by Twelver Shia	Muhammad ibn Jarir al-Tabari (838–923) wrote History of the Prophets and Kings, Tafsir al-Tabari	Abu al-Hasan al-Ash'ari (874–936) wrote Maqālāt al-islāmīyīn, Kitāb al-luma, Kitāb al-ibāna 'an usūl al-diyāna
Ibn Babawayh (923–991) wrote Man La Yahduruhu al-Faqih jurisprudence followed by Twelver Shia	Sharif Razi (930–977) wrote Nahj al-Balagha followed by Twelver Shia	Nasir al-Din al-Tusi (1201–1274) wrote jurisprudence books followed by Ismaili and Twelver Shia	Al-Ghazali (1058–1111) wrote The Niche for Lights, The Incoherence of the Philosophers, The Alchemy of Happiness on Sufism	Rumi (1207–1273) wrote Masnavi, Diwan-e Shams-e Tabrizi on Sufism
Key: Some of Muhammad's Companions	Key: Taught in Medina	Key: Taught in Iraq	Key: Worked in Syria	Key: Travelled extensively collecting the sayings of Muhammad and compiled books of hadith	Key: Worked in Persia
