= Muslim ibn al-Hajjaj =

Arab Muslim hadith scholar (815–875)

Imam Muslim ibn al-Ḥajjāj مسلم بن الحجاج
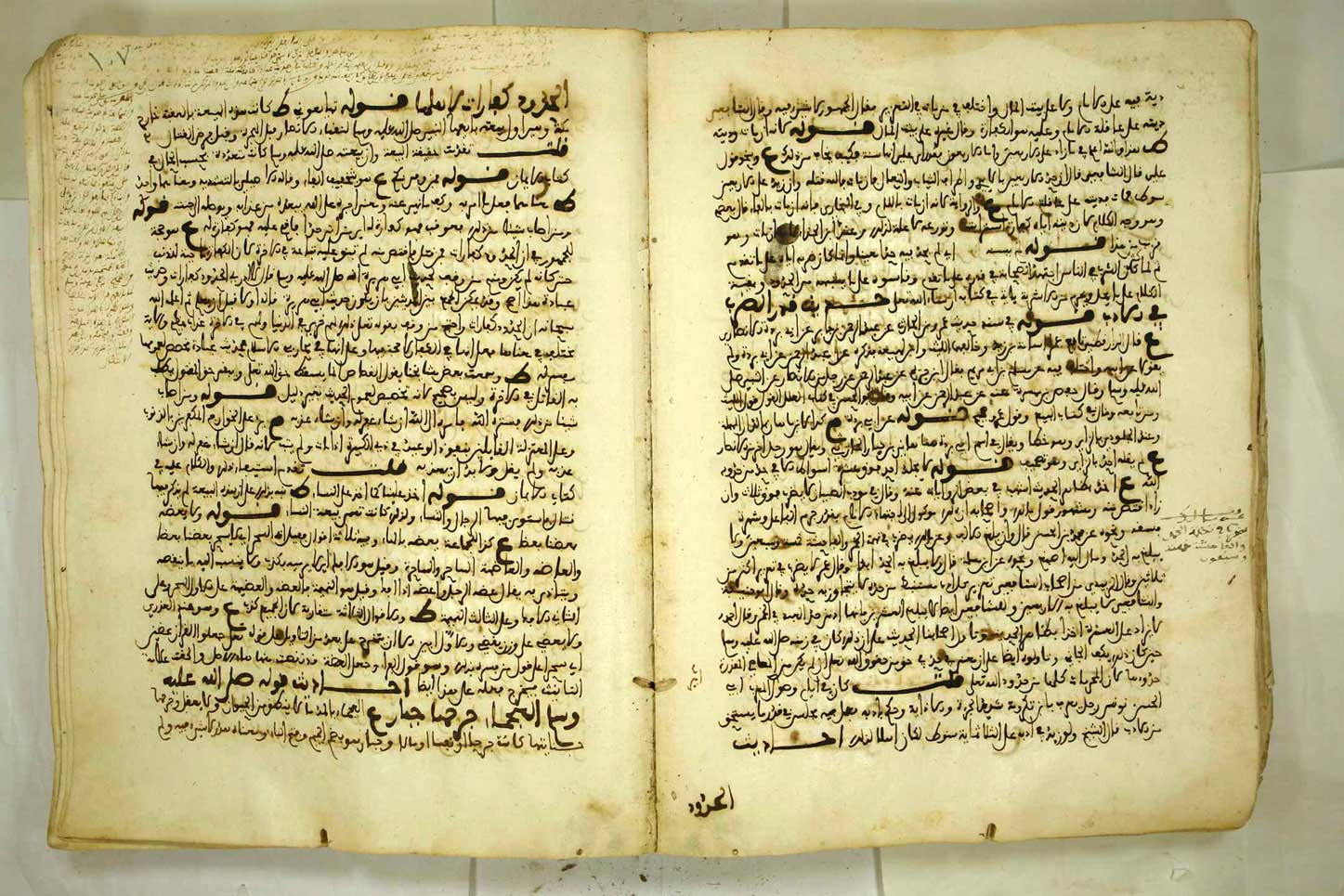
- Old manuscript of Sahih Muslim
- Title: Imām Muslim

Personal life
- Born: after c. 815 Nishapur, Abbasid Caliphate
- Died: May c. 875 Nasarabad, Abbasid Caliphate
- Resting place: Nasarabad
- Era: Islamic Golden Age (Abbasid era)
- Region: Abbasid Caliphate
- Main interest: Hadith Aqidah
- Notable work: Sahih Muslim
- Occupation: Islamic scholar, Muhaddith

Religious life
- Religion: Islam
- Denomination: Sunni

Muslim leader
- Influenced by: Ishaq Ibn Rahwayh, Muhammad al-Bukhari
- Influenced: All Sunni Scholars
- Arabic name
- Personal (Ism): Muslim مُسْلِم
- Patronymic (Nasab): Ibn al-Ḥajjāj ibn Muslim ibn Ward ibn Kushādh ٱبْن ٱلْحَجَّاج ٱبْن مُسْلِم ٱبْن وَرْد ٱبْن كُشَاذ
- Teknonymic (Kunya): Abū al-Ḥusayn أَبُو ٱلْحُسَيْن
- Toponymic (Nisba): Al-Qushayrī al-Naysābūrī ٱلْقُشَيْرِيّ ٱلنَّيْسَابُورِيّ

Abū al-Ḥusayn Muslim ibn al-Ḥajjāj ibn Muslim ibn Ward al-Qushayrī an-Naysābūrī (Note: The name of his father has sometimes been given as حجاج (Ḥajjāj) instead of الحجاج (al-Ḥajjāj). The name of his great-great-grandfather has variously been given as كوشاذ (Kūshādh or Kawshādh), كرشان (Kirshān, Kurshān, or Karshān), or كوشان (Kūshān or Kawshān).) (Arabic: أبو الحسين مسلم بن الحجاج بن مسلم بن وَرْد القشيري النيسابوري; after 815 – May 875 CE / 206 – 261 AH), commonly known as Imam Muslim, was an Islamic scholar from the city of Nishapur, particularly known as a muhaddith (scholar of hadith). His hadith collection, known as Sahih Muslim, is one of the six major hadith collections in Sunni Islam and is regarded as one of the two most authentic (sahih) collections, alongside Sahih al-Bukhari.

== Biography ==
Muslim ibn al-Hajjaj was born in the town of Nishapur in the Abbasid province of Khorasan, in what is now northeastern Iran. Historians differ as to his date of birth, though it is usually given as 202 AH (817/818), 204 AH (819/820), or 206 AH (821/822).

Al-Dhahabi said, "It is said that he was born in the year 204 AH," though he also said, "But I think he was born before that."

Ibn Khallikan could find no report of Muslim's date of birth or age at death by any of the ḥuffāẓ "hadith masters", except their agreement that he was born after 200 AH (815/816). Ibn Khallikan cites ibn al-Salah, who cites al-Hakim al-Nishapuri's Kitab ʿUlama al-Amsar, in the claim that Muslim was 55 years old when he died on 25 Rajab, 261 AH (May 875) and therefore his year of birth must have been 206 AH (821/822).

Ibn al-Bayyiʿ reports that he was buried in Nasarabad, a suburb of Nishapur.

According to scholars, he was of Arab origin. The nisba "al-Qushayri" signifies he belonged to the Arab tribe of Banu Qushayr, members of which migrated to the newly conquered Persian territory during the expansion of the Rashidun Caliphate. According to two scholars, ibn al-Athīr and ibn al-Salāh, he was a member of that tribe. His family had migrated to Persia nearly two centuries earlier following the conquest.

The author's teachers included Harmala ibn Yahya, Sa'id ibn Mansur, Abd-Allah ibn Maslamah al-Qa'nabi, al-Dhuhali, al-Bukhari, ibn Ma'in, Yahya ibn Yahya al-Nishaburi al-Tamimi, and others. Among his students were al-Tirmidhi, ibn Abi Hatim al-Razi, and Ibn Khuzayma, each of whom also wrote works on hadith. After his studies throughout the Arabian Peninsula, Egypt, Iraq and Syria, he settled in his hometown of Nishapur, where he met, and became a lifelong friend of al-Bukhari.

=== Sources ===
Several sources became prominent loci for learning about the biography of Muslim. The History of Baghdad by al-Khatib al-Baghdadi, produced in the 11th century, formed the basis of all subsequent descriptions of his life in Islamic sources. For example, the complete biography of Muslim in the History of Islam by al-Dhahabi contains 27 reports, 11 of which (41%) come from Al-Baghdadi's History. The second most important source for information about Muslim's life, was the History of Nishapur of al-Hakim al-Nishapuri. The History of Baghdad itself, which contains 14 reports about Muslim, took half of them (7) from the History of Nishapur.

== Sahih Muslim ==
In the mid-9th century, Muslim composed a collection of what he considered entirely sahih hadith, now known as Sahih Muslim. Today, it is considered one of the six canonical books of hadith in Sunni Islam. In particular, it along with Sahih al-Bukhari are considered the two pre-eminent collections in this canon; together they are called the Sahihayn. Figures on the number of hadiths in this book vary from three to twelve thousand, depending on whether duplicates are included, or only the text is. Muslim's collection has a substantial overlap with Sahih al-Bukhari: according to Al-Jawzaqi, 2,326 traditions are shared between the two. The collections also roughly share 2,400 narrators; only 430 of the narrators in Sahih al-Bukhari are not found in Sahih Muslim, and only 620 narrators in Sahih Muslim are not found in Sahih al-Bukhari.

== Legacy ==
The scholar of Ahlus-Sunnah, Ishaq Ibn Rahwayh was first to recommend Muslim's work.

Ishaq's contemporaries did not at first accept this; Abu Zur‘a al-Razi objected that Muslim had omitted too much material which Muslim himself recognised as authentic and that he included transmitters who were weak.

Ibn Abi Hatim (d. 327/938) later accepted Muslim as "trustworthy, one of the hadith masters with knowledge of hadith"; but this contrasts with much more fulsome praise of Abu Zur‘a and also his father Abu Hatim. It is similar with Ibn al-Nadim.

Muslim's book gradually increased in stature such that it is considered among Ahlus-Sunnah the most authentic collections of hadith, second only to Sahih Bukhari.

== Works ==
- Sahih Muslim: his collection of authentic hadith

Al-Kuna wa al-Asma: his collections of narrator's names and kunyas Al-Tamyiz: His work on the hidden defects in hadith (illal)

== Notes ==
Early Islamic scholars

Muhammad, The final Messenger of God (570–632) the Constitution of Medina, taught the Quran, and advised his companions
Abdullah ibn Masud (died 653) taught	Ali (607–661) fourth caliph taught	Aisha, Muhammad's wife and Abu Bakr's daughter taught	Abd Allah ibn Abbas (618–687) taught	Zayd ibn Thabit (610–660) taught	Umar (579–644) second caliph taught	Abu Hurairah (603–681) taught
Alqama ibn Qays (died 681) taught	Husayn ibn Ali (626–680) taught	Qasim ibn Muhammad ibn Abi Bakr (657–725) taught and raised by Aisha	Urwah ibn Zubayr (died 713) taught by Aisha, he then taught	Said ibn al-Musayyib (637–715) taught	Abdullah ibn Umar (614–693) taught	Abd Allah ibn al-Zubayr (624–692) taught by Aisha, he then taught
Ibrahim al-Nakha’i taught	Ali ibn Husayn Zayn al-Abidin (659–712) taught	Hisham ibn Urwah (667–772) taught	Ibn Shihab al-Zuhri (died 741) taught	Salim ibn Abd-Allah ibn Umar taught	Umar ibn Abdul Aziz (682–720) raised and taught by Abdullah ibn Umar
Hammad ibn Abi Sulayman taught	Muhammad al-Baqir (676–733) taught	Farwah bint al-Qasim Jafar's mother
Abu Hanifa (699–767) wrote Al Fiqh Al Akbar and Kitab Al-Athar, jurisprudence followed by Sunni, Sunni Sufi, Barelvi, Deobandi, Zaidiyyah and originally by the Fatimid and taught	Zayd ibn Ali (695–740)	Ja'far bin Muhammad Al-Baqir (702–765) Muhammad and Ali's great great grand son, jurisprudence followed by Shia, he taught	Malik ibn Anas (711–795) wrote Muwatta, jurisprudence from early Medina period now mostly followed by Maliki Sunnis in North Africa, and taught	Al-Waqidi (748–822) wrote history books like Kitab al-Tarikh wa al-Maghazi, student of Malik ibn Anas	Abu Muhammad Abdullah ibn Abdul Hakam (died 829) wrote biographies and history books, student of Malik ibn Anas
Abu Yusuf (729–798) wrote Usul al-fiqh	Muhammad al-Shaybani (749–805)	al-Shafi‘i (767–820) wrote Al-Risala, jurisprudence followed by Shafi'i Sunnis and Sufis, and taught	Ismail ibn Ibrahim	Ali ibn al-Madini (778–849) wrote The Book of Knowledge of the Companions	Ibn Hisham (died 833) wrote early history and As-Sirah an-Nabawiyyah, Muhammad's biography
Isma'il ibn Ja'far (719–775)	Musa al-Kadhim (745–799)	Ahmad ibn Hanbal (780–855) wrote Musnad Ahmad ibn Hanbal jurisprudence followed by Hanbali Sunnis and Sufis	Muhammad al-Bukhari (810–870) wrote Sahih al-Bukhari hadith books	Muslim ibn al-Hajjaj (815–875) wrote Sahih Muslim hadith books	Dawud al-Zahiri (815–883/4) founded the Zahiri school	Muhammad ibn Isa at-Tirmidhi (824–892) wrote Jami` at-Tirmidhi hadith books	Al-Baladhuri (died 892) wrote early history Futuh al-Buldan, Genealogies of the Nobles
Ibn Majah (824–887) wrote Sunan ibn Majah hadith book	Abu Dawood (817–889) wrote Sunan Abu Dawood Hadith Book
Muhammad ibn Ya'qub al-Kulayni (864- 941) wrote Kitab al-Kafi hadith book followed by Twelver Shia	Muhammad ibn Jarir al-Tabari (838–923) wrote History of the Prophets and Kings, Tafsir al-Tabari	Abu al-Hasan al-Ash'ari (874–936) wrote Maqālāt al-islāmīyīn, Kitāb al-luma, Kitāb al-ibāna 'an usūl al-diyāna
Ibn Babawayh (923–991) wrote Man La Yahduruhu al-Faqih jurisprudence followed by Twelver Shia	Sharif Razi (930–977) wrote Nahj al-Balagha followed by Twelver Shia	Nasir al-Din al-Tusi (1201–1274) wrote jurisprudence books followed by Ismaili and Twelver Shia	Al-Ghazali (1058–1111) wrote The Niche for Lights, The Incoherence of the Philosophers, The Alchemy of Happiness on Sufism	Rumi (1207–1273) wrote Masnavi, Diwan-e Shams-e Tabrizi on Sufism
Key: Some of Muhammad's Companions	Key: Taught in Medina	Key: Taught in Iraq	Key: Worked in Syria	Key: Travelled extensively collecting the sayings of Muhammad and compiled books of hadith	Key: Worked in Persia
