= Qasim ibn Muhammad ibn Abi Bakr =

Grandson of Caliph Abu Bakr (660/662 – 728/730)

Al-Qasim ibn Muhammad ibn Abi Bakr
- القاسِم إبِن مُحمّد إبِن أبي بَكَر

Personal life
- Born: 660 or 662
- Died: 738 (aged 68–69), 108 AH
- Spouse: Asma bint Abd al-Rahman ibn Abi Bakr
- Children: Umm Farwa bint al-Qasim; Abd al-Rahman ibn al-Qasim
- Parent: Muhammad ibn Abi Bakr (father)
- Era: Islamic Golden Age
- Region: Muslim scholar
- Main interest(s): Sunnah, Hadith, fiqh and tafsir

Religious life
- Religion: Islam

Muslim leader
- Influenced by: Ibn Abbas
- Influenced: Abu l-Zinad 'Abd Allah ibn Dhakwan

Al-Qāsim ibn Muḥammad ibn Abī Bakr (Arabic: قاسم إبن محمد) (born 36 or 38 AH and died 106 AH or 108 AH; corresponding to c. 660/662 and 728/730) was a jurist in early Islam.

In the Naqshbandi Sufi order (originated in the 14th century) he is regarded as a link in the Golden Chain, in which he was purportedly succeeded by his maternal grandson Ja'far al-Sadiq.

== Biography ==
Al-Qāsim ibn Muhammad ibn Abī Bakr was born on a Thursday, in the month of Ramadan, on 36 / 38 AH (approximately).

=== Family ===
Al-Qāsim's father was Muhammad, son of the first Rashidun Caliph, Abu Bakr. His paternal aunt was Aisha, one of the wives of the Islamic prophet Muhammad. Some traditions state that Al-Qāsim's mother was a daughter of Yazdegerd III and a sister of Shahrbanu, the mother of fourth Shi'a Imam, Ali ibn Husayn.

Al-Qāsim married Asma, a daughter of his paternal uncle Abdul-Rahman ibn Abi Bakr. They were the parents of a daughter, Umm Farwah. The latter later married Ali's son Muhammad al-Baqir and became the mother of the sixth Shi'a Imam, Ja'far as-Sadiq. Al-Qāsim also had a son named Abdur-Rahman.

=== Life ===
Aisha lived until old age and taught her nephew Qasim ibn Muhammad ibn Abi Bakr. Many Hadith are quoted through Qasim.

He learned hadith and fiqh from his aunt and from Ibn Abbas. He was a transmitter of hadith.

He was among The Seven Fuqaha of Medina who were largely responsible for the transmission of knowledge from Medina and were the source of much of the information of Islam and the Sunnah available today.

He left and went to al-Qudayd, a place between Makkah and Madinah on the 9th of Muharram, where he died. The year was 108 (or 109) AH/730 or 731 CE, and he was seventy years old.

== Early Islam scholars ==
Early Islamic scholars

Muhammad, The final Messenger of God (570–632) the Constitution of Medina, taught the Quran, and advised his companions
Abdullah ibn Masud (died 653) taught	Ali (607–661) fourth caliph taught	Aisha, Muhammad's wife and Abu Bakr's daughter taught	Abd Allah ibn Abbas (618–687) taught	Zayd ibn Thabit (610–660) taught	Umar (579–644) second caliph taught	Abu Hurairah (603–681) taught
Alqama ibn Qays (died 681) taught	Husayn ibn Ali (626–680) taught	Qasim ibn Muhammad ibn Abi Bakr (657–725) taught and raised by Aisha	Urwah ibn Zubayr (died 713) taught by Aisha, he then taught	Said ibn al-Musayyib (637–715) taught	Abdullah ibn Umar (614–693) taught	Abd Allah ibn al-Zubayr (624–692) taught by Aisha, he then taught
Ibrahim al-Nakha’i taught	Ali ibn Husayn Zayn al-Abidin (659–712) taught	Hisham ibn Urwah (667–772) taught	Ibn Shihab al-Zuhri (died 741) taught	Salim ibn Abd-Allah ibn Umar taught	Umar ibn Abdul Aziz (682–720) raised and taught by Abdullah ibn Umar
Hammad ibn Abi Sulayman taught	Muhammad al-Baqir (676–733) taught	Farwah bint al-Qasim Jafar's mother
Abu Hanifa (699–767) wrote Al Fiqh Al Akbar and Kitab Al-Athar, jurisprudence followed by Sunni, Sunni Sufi, Barelvi, Deobandi, Zaidiyyah and originally by the Fatimid and taught	Zayd ibn Ali (695–740)	Ja'far bin Muhammad Al-Baqir (702–765) Muhammad and Ali's great great grand son, jurisprudence followed by Shia, he taught	Malik ibn Anas (711–795) wrote Muwatta, jurisprudence from early Medina period now mostly followed by Maliki Sunnis in North Africa, and taught	Al-Waqidi (748–822) wrote history books like Kitab al-Tarikh wa al-Maghazi, student of Malik ibn Anas	Abu Muhammad Abdullah ibn Abdul Hakam (died 829) wrote biographies and history books, student of Malik ibn Anas
Abu Yusuf (729–798) wrote Usul al-fiqh	Muhammad al-Shaybani (749–805)	al-Shafi‘i (767–820) wrote Al-Risala, jurisprudence followed by Shafi'i Sunnis and Sufis, and taught	Ismail ibn Ibrahim	Ali ibn al-Madini (778–849) wrote The Book of Knowledge of the Companions	Ibn Hisham (died 833) wrote early history and As-Sirah an-Nabawiyyah, Muhammad's biography
Isma'il ibn Ja'far (719–775)	Musa al-Kadhim (745–799)	Ahmad ibn Hanbal (780–855) wrote Musnad Ahmad ibn Hanbal jurisprudence followed by Hanbali Sunnis and Sufis	Muhammad al-Bukhari (810–870) wrote Sahih al-Bukhari hadith books	Muslim ibn al-Hajjaj (815–875) wrote Sahih Muslim hadith books	Dawud al-Zahiri (815–883/4) founded the Zahiri school	Muhammad ibn Isa at-Tirmidhi (824–892) wrote Jami` at-Tirmidhi hadith books	Al-Baladhuri (died 892) wrote early history Futuh al-Buldan, Genealogies of the Nobles
Ibn Majah (824–887) wrote Sunan ibn Majah hadith book	Abu Dawood (817–889) wrote Sunan Abu Dawood Hadith Book
Muhammad ibn Ya'qub al-Kulayni (864- 941) wrote Kitab al-Kafi hadith book followed by Twelver Shia	Muhammad ibn Jarir al-Tabari (838–923) wrote History of the Prophets and Kings, Tafsir al-Tabari	Abu al-Hasan al-Ash'ari (874–936) wrote Maqālāt al-islāmīyīn, Kitāb al-luma, Kitāb al-ibāna 'an usūl al-diyāna
Ibn Babawayh (923–991) wrote Man La Yahduruhu al-Faqih jurisprudence followed by Twelver Shia	Sharif Razi (930–977) wrote Nahj al-Balagha followed by Twelver Shia	Nasir al-Din al-Tusi (1201–1274) wrote jurisprudence books followed by Ismaili and Twelver Shia	Al-Ghazali (1058–1111) wrote The Niche for Lights, The Incoherence of the Philosophers, The Alchemy of Happiness on Sufism	Rumi (1207–1273) wrote Masnavi, Diwan-e Shams-e Tabrizi on Sufism
Key: Some of Muhammad's Companions	Key: Taught in Medina	Key: Taught in Iraq	Key: Worked in Syria	Key: Travelled extensively collecting the sayings of Muhammad and compiled books of hadith	Key: Worked in Persia

== See also ==
- Salaf
- The Seven Fuqaha of Medina
- Naqshbandi Haqqani Sufi Order
