= Ibn Misk Al-Sakhawi =

ibn Misk Al-Sakhawi
- Born: 1616
- Died: 1711 (94–95 years old)
- Occupations: Scholar and poet

Zain Al-Din Abdulrahman bin Ahmad bin Abdulrahman Al-Sakhawi Al-Ansari Al-Shafi’i Al-Burhani, known as ibn Misk (Arabic: زين الدين عبدالرحمن بن أحمد السَّخاوي الأنصاري الشافعي البرهاني المعروف بابن مسك).

(1616 – 1711 AD) (1025 – 1123 AH), was an Egyptian Shafi’i jurisprudent, author and poet from the seventeenth century AD/11 AH. He summarized his biography by mentioning his writings. He wrote many books about jurisprudence, literature and language. He also had a collection of poems.

== His career ==
He is Abdulrahman ibn Misk Abdulrahman ibn Ahmad ibn Abdulrahman ibn Ahmad ibn Ahmad ibn Muhammad ibn Misk Al-Sakhawi Al-Ansari Al-Shafi’i Al-Burhani. He was born in 1025 AH / 1616 AD and died in 1123 AH / 1711 AD. He was mentioned by Omar Rida Kahhalah in "Authors' dictionary" (Arabic title:Mu'jam al-Mu'allifin), who said about him, "Abdulrahman bin Ahmad bin Abdulrahman bin Misk Al-Sakhawi, al-Shafi’i, known as Ibn Misk (Zain al-Din) was a scholar and a writer. His writings included Al-Ajweba; Tanweeq Al-Nataqa fe Elm Al-Waraqah; Al-Dur Al-Nafis fe Al-jam' bayna Al-Tadsis wa Al-Takhmis fe Qasidet Al-Burdah; three poetic collections about love, praise, and judgement; a letter in Al-Zij; and an explanation of Al-Maqsura Al-Duraidiyyah". Ismail Pasha Al-Baghdadi said about him in "The gift of those who know" (Arabic title:Hadeyyat Al-Arifeen), "Ibn Misk Al-Sakhawi – Abdulrahman ibn Ahmad al-Shafi’I, who was a writer, known as Ibn Misk Al-Sakhawi was born in 1025 AD and died in 1123 AD. Among his works were Al-Ajweba Al-Mustanbatah ala Al-Aselah Al-Multaqatah, Ershad Al-Ghawi fe Esa'ad Al-Taleb Al- Rawi, Al-Estitan fima Yu'tasam men Al-Shaitan, Tanweeq Al-Waraqah fe Elm Al-Nataqah, Al-Dur Al-Nafis fe Al-jam' bayna Al-Tadsis wa Al-Takhmis fe Qasidet Al-Burdah, a collection of poems, a letter in Al-Zij, Rawnaq Al-Mahakem fima Yuzawwaj fih Al-Hakem, an explanation of Al-Maqsura Al-Duraidiyyah, Dharb Al-Targhib fe Fadl Al-Salat ala Al-Habib, Ghali Al-Esnad fe Madh Al-Nabi (pbuh), Al-Wudueyyah poem and its explanation.

== His works ==
- (Arabic title:Al-Ajweba Al-Mustanbatah ala Al-As'elah Al-Multaqatah), in Al-Shafi'I law.
- (Arabic title:Dharb Al-Targhib fe Fadl Al-Salat ala Al-Habib) or (Arabic title:Dharuret Al-Targhib fe Fadl Al-Salat ala Al-Habib: about Prophet Muhammad and his family).
- (Arabic title:Al-Dur Al-Nafis fe Al-jam' bayna Al-Tadsis wa Al-Takhmis fe Qasidet Al-Burdah), which starts with "Praise be to Allah who removed the dot of Ghain in ain etc. He mentioned that he made Al-Burdah into sixths, halves, fifths. He made it into halves by asking some of his beloved ones."
- (Poetic collections) which included collections about love, praise and judgment.
- (Arabic title: gali Al'esnad min 'Aly Al-es'aad fe mad'h Al-Nabi).
- (Arabic title: Al-Lama'a Al-Mekeyya ala Al-Maqsura Al-Duraidiyyah).
- (Arabic title: Muthalath) ibn Misk: It's an organized linguistic triangle like Qutrub's triangle.
- (Arabic title: Aqd Al-Jamman fe Fada'el Laylatu Nesf Shaaban), which starts with " Praise be to Allah who deserves to be thanked and praised the most".
- (Arabic title: Umdatu Al-Aref and Udatu Al-Ma'aref): the science of Tasawwuf. It starts with " When Allah Almighty favored me with taking the path and entering the paths of the people of investigation at the hands of my sheikh, the knowledgeable, the guide, Saleh Abd Al-Qadir" .
- (Arabic title: Rawnaq Al-Mahakem le sharh Al-masael al-lati Yuzawwaj fiha Al-Hakem or Rawnaq Al-Mahakem fima Yuzawwaj fih Al-Hakem: in Shafi'I law). It starts with "Someone I like his approval and I don't like his disapprovals asked me to explain to him the verses organized by Jalal Al-Suyuti Al-Shafi’i"
- (Arabic title: Mandhumet Maqased Al-Estitan fima Yu'tasam men Al-Shaitan).
- (Arabic title:Tanweeq Al-Waraqah fe Elm Al-Nataqah) The book is lost and nothing of it is known other than the title.
- (Arabic title:Resalah fe Al-Zij).
