= Al-Shafi'i =

Muslim scholar, jurist, and traditionist (767–820)

Imam Al-Shafi'i
- الشافعيّ
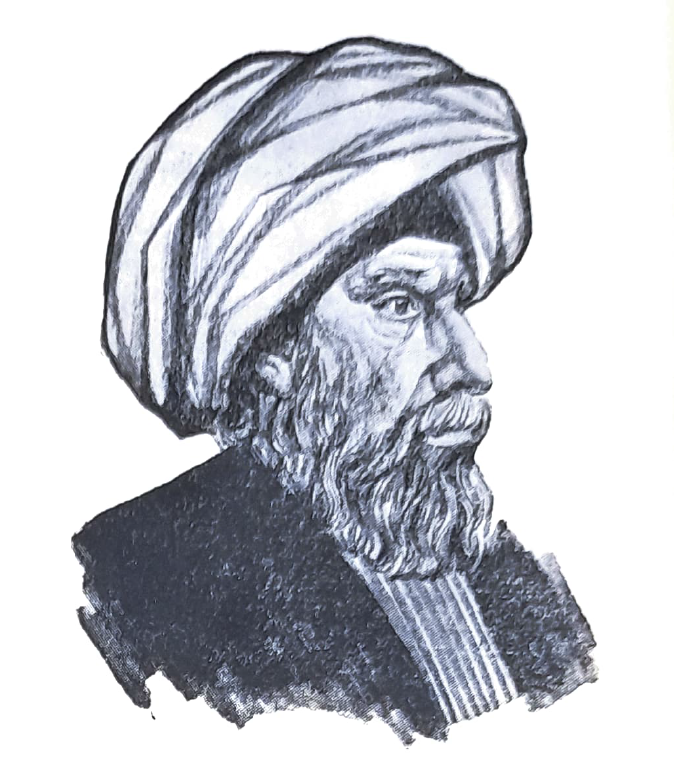
- A sketch representing Al-Shafi'i from a book entitled Sayr mulhimah: min al-Sharq wa-al-Gharb by unknown author, 1961
- Title: Shaykh al-Islām; Offspring of the House of the Prophet; Peerless One; Scrupulously Pious Ascetic; Friend of God

Personal life
- Born: Muḥammad ibn Idrīs ibn al-ʿAbbās al-Shāfiʿī al-Ḥijāzī al-Qurashī al-Hāshimī al-Muṭṭalibī; 767 CE (150 AH) Gaza, Palestine, Abbasid Caliphate
- Died: 820 CE (204 AH; aged 53–54) Fustat, Egypt, Abbasid Caliphate
- Resting place: Mausoleum of Imam al-Shafi'i, Cairo
- Era: Islamic Golden Age (early Abbasid)
- Main interests: Jurisprudence; hadith; theology; asceticism
- Notable ideas: Shafi'i school; Principles of Islamic jurisprudence
- Notable works: Al-Risala; Al-Umm; Al-Musnad
- Occupation: Scholar; jurist; traditionist; theologian

Religious life
- Religion: Islam
- Denomination: Sunni
- Jurisprudence: Independent (eponym of the Shafi'i school)

Muslim leader
- Influenced by: Ja'far al-Sadiq; Muhammad al-Shaybani; Malik ibn Anas; Sufyan ibn Uyayna; al-Layth ibn Sa'd; al-Sayyida Nafisa
- Influenced: All subsequent Sunni Scholars
- Arabic name
- Personal (Ism): Muḥammad مُحَمَّد
- Patronymic (Nasab): Ibn Idrīs ibn al-ʿAbbās ٱبْن إِدْرِيس بْن ٱلْعَبَّاس
- Teknonymic (Kunya): Abū ʿAbd Allāh أَبُو عَبْد ٱللَّٰه
- Toponymic (Nisba): Al-Shāfiʿī al-Ḥijāzī al-Qurashī al-Muṭṭalibī ٱلشَّافِعِيّ ٱلْحِجَازِيّ ٱلْقُرَشِيّ ٱلْمُطَّلِبِيّ

Al-Shafi'i (Note: Full name Abū ʿAbd Allāh Muḥammad ibn Idrīs ibn al-ʿAbbās al-Shāfiʿī al-Ḥijāzī al-Qurashī al-Hāshimī al-Muṭṭalibī (Arabic: أَبُو عَبْد ٱللَّٰه مُحَمَّد بْن إِدْرِيس بْن ٱلْعَبَّاس ٱلشَّافِعِيّ ٱلْحِجَازِيّ ٱلْقُرَشِيّ ٱلْهَاشِمِيّ ٱلْمُطَّلِبِيّ). He is also known by the titles Shaykh al-Islam, Offspring of the House of the Prophet, Peerless One, Scrupulously Pious Ascetic, and Friend of God.) (Arabic: الشَّافِعِيّ, romanized: al-Shāfiʿī; IPA: [a(l) ʃaːfiʕiː]; 767–820 CE; d. AH 204) was a Muslim scholar, jurist, muhaddith, traditionist, theologian, and ascetic, and the founder and eponym of the Shāfiʿī school of Sunni Islamic jurisprudence. He played a formative role in the systematization of the principles of Islamic jurisprudence (uṣūl al-fiqh) and is regarded as its founder. His al-Risāla was among the earliest works devoted to the subject and gave Islamic legal theory a systematic form, thereby "fundamentally influencing the succeeding generations which are under his direct and obvious impact," and "beginning a new phase of the development of legal theory."

Al-Shafi'i was born in Gaza, Palestine, into the Banu Muttalib clan of the Quraysh tribe. At the age of two he was taken to Mecca, where he was raised. He subsequently lived in Medina, Yemen, Baghdad, and Egypt, and for a period served as a judge in Najran.

Among his numerous teachers was Mālik ibn Anas, from whom al-Shafi'i nevertheless differed by giving particular attention to the methods by which the Qur'an and sunna were to be applied in jurisprudence. He sought to formulate rules governing the use of qiyās (analogical reasoning), and, having subjected analogy to methodological rules, employed it to establish a middle course between conservative traditionalism and legal innovation. His treatment of legal method and the sources of law marked a new phase in the development of Islamic legal theory and became a major influence on later jurisprudence.

== Introduction ==
The biography of al-Shafi'i is difficult to trace. It was said Dawud al-Zahiri (d. 884 CE) was the first to write one, but the work has been lost. The oldest surviving biography goes back to Ibn Abi Hatim al-Razi (d. 938/939 CE), but is only a collection of anecdotes, some of them fantastical. Similarly, a biographical sketch written by Zakariyya ibn Yahya al-Saji was later reproduced, but even then, a great deal of legend had already crept into the story of al-Shafi'i's life. The first real biography was written by al-Bayhaqi (d. 1065/1066 CE), but is filled with what a modernist eye would qualify as pious legends. The following is what seems to be a sensible reading, according to a modern reductionist perspective.

== Biography ==
=== Ancestry ===
Al-Shafi'i belonged to the Qurayshi clan of Banu Muttalib, which was the sister clan of the Banu Hashim, to which Muhammad and the Abbasid caliphs belonged. This lineage may have given him prestige, arising from his belonging to the tribe of Muhammad, and his great-grandfather's kinship to him. However, he grew up in poverty, in spite of his connections to the highest social circles.

=== Early life ===
Born in Gaza, Palestine, near the town of Ashkelon in 767/768 CE/150 AH. His father died in Sham while he was still a child. Fearing the waste of his sharif lineage, his mother decided to move to Mecca when he was about two years old. Furthermore, his maternal family roots were from Yemen, and there were more members of his family in Mecca, where his mother believed he would better be taken care of. Little is known about al-Shafi'i's early life in Mecca, except that he was brought up in poor circumstances and that from his youth he was devoted to learning. An account states that his mother could not afford to buy his paper, so he would write his lessons on bones, particularly shoulder-bones. He studied under Muslim ibn Khalid al-Zanji, the then-judge of Mecca, who is thus considered to be his first teacher. By the age of seven, al-Shafi'i had memorised the Quran. At ten, he had committed Malik ibn Anas's Muwatta to heart, at which time his teacher would deputise him to teach in his absence. Al-Shafi'i was authorised to issue rulings at the age of fifteen.

Modern accounts also report that, while living in Mecca in modest circumstances, al-Shāfiʿī became strongly interested in poetry and archery, activities associated with Arabic tribal aristocratic culture. Later biographical traditions link his early eloquence to time spent among the Hudhayl, a tribe famed for the purity of its Arabic, and describe him as a highly skilled archer. Some sources also attribute to him a short treatise on archery, later cited in connection with Kitāb al-Umm.

=== Apprenticeship under Malik ibn Anas ===
Al-Shafi'i moved to Medina in desire for further legal training, as was the tradition of acquiring knowledge. Accounts differ on the age in which he set out to Medina; an account placed his age at thirteen, while another stated that he was in his twenties. According to Ibn Abī Ḥātim al-Rāzī, while still in Mecca al-S̲h̲āfiʿī obtained a copy of the Muwaṭṭaʾ—the principal work of Mālik—and learned it by heart before introducing himself to Mālik in persistently asking his permission to recite it to him. There, he was taught for many years by the famous Malik ibn Anas, who was impressed with his memory, knowledge, and intelligence. By the time of Malik's death in 179 AH (795 CE), al-Shafi'i had already gained a reputation as a brilliant jurist. Even though he would later disagree with some of the views of Malik, al-Shafi'i accorded the deepest respect to him by always referring to him as the "Teacher".

=== Political turmoil in Yemen ===
At the age of thirty, al-Shafi'i was appointed as the Abbasid governor in the Yemeni city of Najran. He proved to be a just administrator but soon became entangled with factional jealousies. In 803 CE, al-Shafi'i was accused of aiding the Alids in a revolt, and was thus summoned in chains with a number of Alids to the caliph Harun al-Rashid at Raqqa. Whilst other conspirators were put to death, al-Shafi'i's own eloquent defence convinced the caliph to dismiss the charge. Other accounts state that the famous Hanafi jurist, Muhammad al-Shaybani, was present at the court and defended al-Shafi'i as a well-known student of the sacred law. What was certain was that the incident brought al-Shafi'i in close contact with al-Shaybani, who would soon become his teacher. It was also postulated that this incident impelled him to devote the rest of his career to legal studies, never again to seek government service.

=== Apprenticeship under al-Shaybani, and exposure to Hanafi jurists ===
Al-Shafi'i traveled to Baghdad to study with Abu Hanifah's acolyte al-Shaybani and others. Here he developed his first school, influenced by the teachings of both Abu Hanifah and Malik. His work thus became known as "al-madhhab al-qadim li-l-imam al-shafi'i", or the "old school of al-Shafi'i".

It was here that al-Shafi'i actively participated in legal arguments with the Hanafi jurists, strenuously defending the Maliki school of thought. Some authorities stress the difficulties encountered by him in his arguments. Al-Shafi'i eventually left Baghdad for Mecca in 804 CE, possibly because of complaints by Hanafi followers to al-Shaybani that al-Shafi'i had become somewhat critical of al-Shaybani's position during their disputes. As a result, al-Shafi'i reportedly participated in a debate with al-Shaybani over their differences, though who won the debate is disputed.

In Mecca, al-Shafi'i began to lecture at the Sacred Mosque, leaving a deep impression on many students of jurisprudence, including the founder of the Hanbali school, Ahmad ibn Hanbal. Al-Shafi'i's legal reasoning began to mature, as he started to appreciate the strength in the legal reasoning of the Hanafi jurists, and became aware of the weaknesses inherent in both the Maliki and Hanafi schools of thought.

=== Departure to Baghdad and Egypt ===
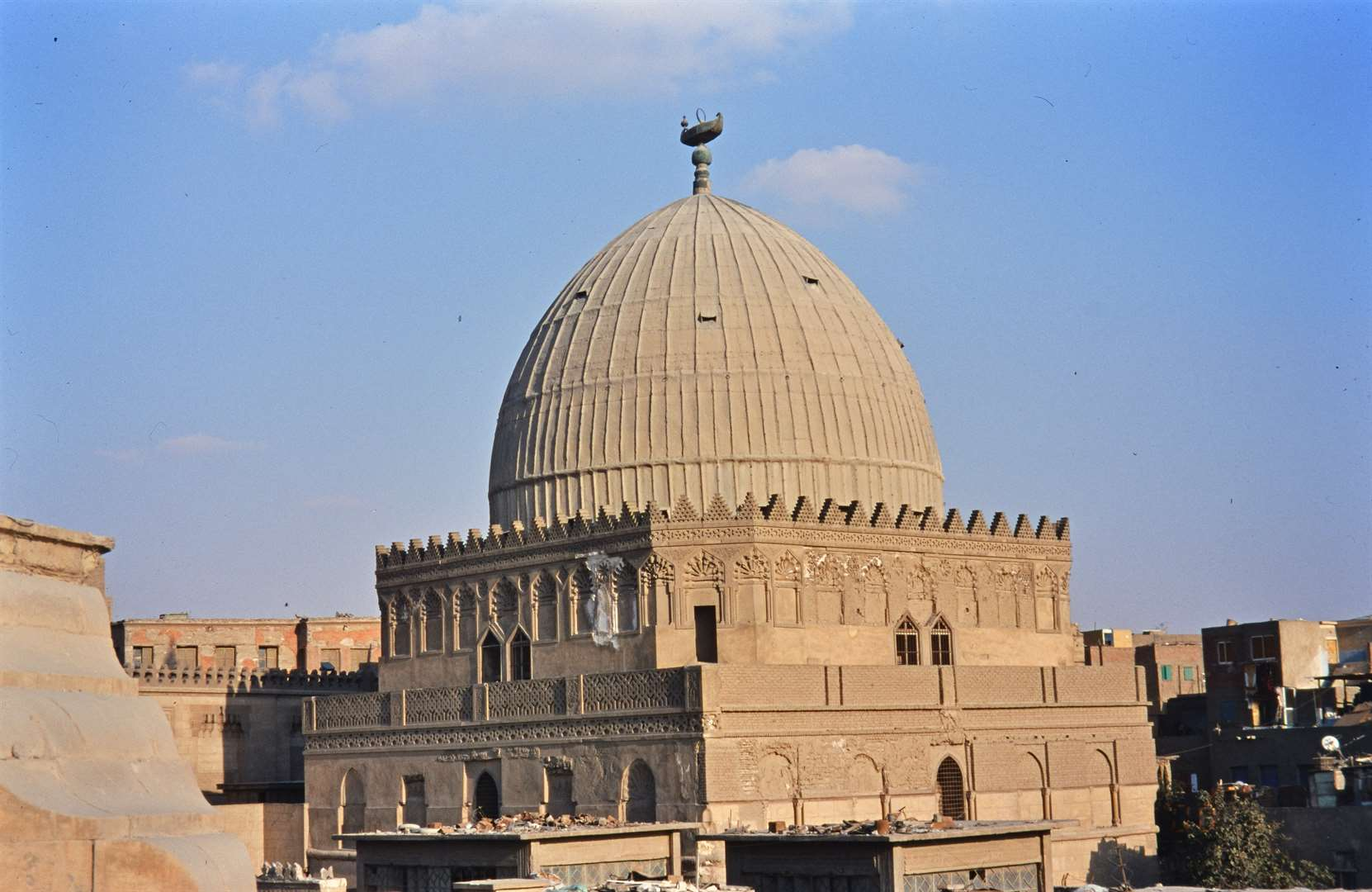
The Imam al-Shafi'i Mausoleum in Cairo, Egypt

Al-Shafi'i eventually returned to Baghdad in 810 CE. By this time, his stature as a jurist had grown sufficiently to permit him to establish an independent line of legal speculation. The caliph al-Ma'mun is said to have offered al-Shafi'i a position as a judge, but he declined the offer.

It was however in Egypt—he lectured in the mosque of ʿAmr—that al-S̲h̲āfiʿī's teaching had its greatest impact; his principal disciples were Egyptians and subsequently S̲h̲āfiʿism completed successfully with Mālikism for supremacy in Egypt . It was here that al-S̲h̲āfiʿī composed the new version of his Risāla (the one which has survived) and the majority of the texts collected in the K. al-Umm.

Modern scholarship notes that al-Shāfiʿī's final settlement in Egypt likely reflected both intellectual and social pressures encountered in the Ḥijāz and Baghdad, where Mālikī and Ḥanafī circles predominated. In Fusṭāṭ, he was able to articulate what later Shāfiʿī scholars termed his "new doctrine" (al-madhhab al-jadīd), revising aspects of his earlier legal positions developed in Iraq and consolidating his mature legal methodology.

==== Connection with the family of Muhammad ====
In 814 CE, al-Shafi'i decided to leave Baghdad for Egypt. The precise reasons for his departure from Iraq are uncertain, but it was in Egypt that he would meet another tutor, al-Sayyidah Nafisah, who would also financially support his studies, and where he would dictate his life's works to students. Several of his leading disciples would write down what al-Shafi'i said, who would then have them read it back aloud so that corrections could be made. Al-Shafi'i biographers all agree the legacy of works under his name are the result of those sessions with his disciples.

Through Muhammad's grandson Hasan ibn Ali, Nafisah was a descendant of Muhammad, and she married another descendant of Muhammad, Ishaq al-Mu'tamin. Ishaq was the son of Ja'far al-Sadiq, a teacher of al-Shafi'i's teachers Malik ibn Anas, as well as Abu Hanifah. Thus, all of the four major imams of Sunni jurisprudence—Abu Hanifah, Malik, his student al-Shafi'i, and his student Ahmad—are connected to Ja'far al-Sadiq, who was from the household of Muhammad, whether directly or indirectly.

=== Death ===
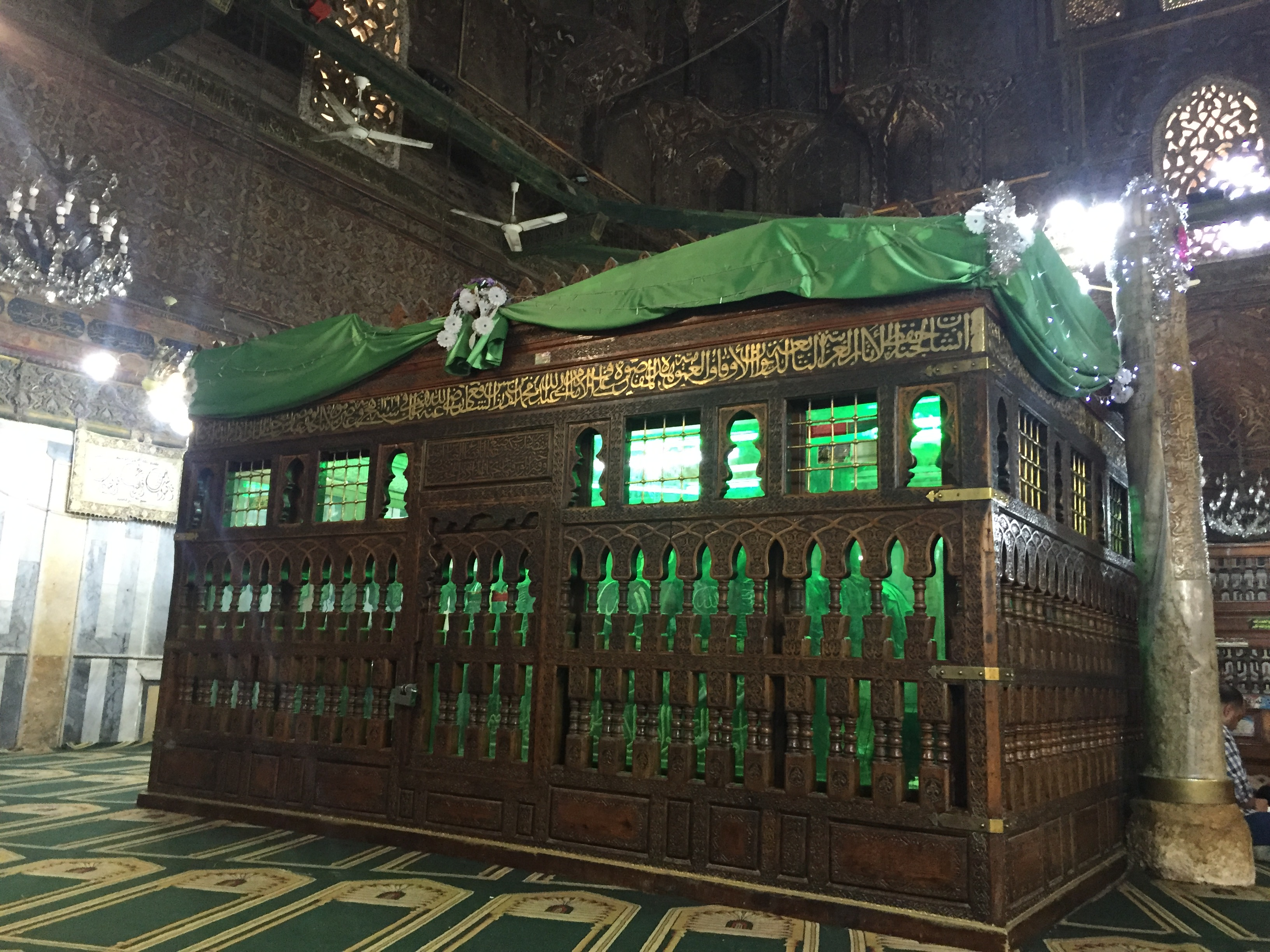
Al-Shafi'i's tomb in Cairo, Egypt

At least one authority states that al-Shafi'i died as a result of injuries sustained from an attack by supporters of a Maliki follower named Fityan. The story goes that al-Shafi'i triumphed in the argument over Fityan, who, being intemperate, resorted to abuse. The then-governor of Egypt, with whom al-Shafi'i had good relations, ordered Fityan punished by having him paraded through the streets of the city carrying a plank and stating the reason for his punishment. Fityan's supporters were enraged by this treatment and attacked al-Shafi'i in retaliation after one of his lectures, causing him to die a few days later. However, Ibn Hajar al-Asqalani casts doubt on this story, claiming it is not "from a reliable source". Al-Shafi'i was also known to have suffered from a painful intestinal illness and hemorrhoids, which kept him frail and ailing during the later years of his life. Thus, the precise cause of his death is unknown.

Al-Shafi'i died at the age of 54 on 20 January 820 CE/30 Rajab 204 AH, in al-Fustat, Egypt. He was buried in the vault of the Banu Abd al-Hakam, City of the Dead near Mokattam. The dome was built in 1212 CE/608 AH by the Ayyubid sultan al-Kamil. Al-Shafi'i's mausoleum remains an important site today.

== Legacy ==
The Shafi'i school, one of the four Sunni schools of Islamic jurisprudence, known as madhhabs, is named for Al-Shāfi'ī, who is also credited setting up the framework of Islamic jurisprudence by establishing the relative importance order of its different sources as follows:

1. The Qur'an;
2. Hadith. i.e. collections of the words, actions, and silent approval of Muhammad. (Together with the Qur'an these make up "revealed sources");
3. Ijma. i.e. the consensus of the (pure traditional) Muslim community;
4. Qiyas. i.e. the method of analogy.

Scholar John Burton goes farther, crediting Al-Shafi'i not just with establishing the science of fiqh in Islam, but its importance to the religion. "Where his contemporaries and their predecessors had engaged in defining Islam as a social and historical phenomenon, Shafi'i sought to define a revealed Law."

Al-Shāfi‘ī emphasized the final authority of a hadith of Muhammad so that even the Qur'an was "to be interpreted in the light of traditions (i.e. hadith), and not vice versa." While traditionally the Quran is considered above the Sunna in authority, Al-Shafi'i "forcefully argued" that the sunna stands "on equal footing with the Quran", (according to scholar Daniel Brown) for – as Al-Shafi'i put it – "the command of the Prophet is the command of Almighty Allah."

The focus by the Muslim community on ahadith of Muhammad and disinterest in ahadith of Muhammad's companions (whose ahadith were commonly used before Al-Shāfi‘ī since most of whom survived him and spread his teachings after his death) is thought (by scholar Joseph Schacht) to reflect the success of Al-Shāfi‘ī's doctrine.

Al-Shāfi‘ī influence was such that he changed the use of the term Sunnah, "until it invariably meant only the Sunnah of the Prophet" (according to John Burton this was his "principle achievement"). While earlier, sunnah had been used to refer to tribal manners and customs, (and while Al-Shāfi‘ī distinguished between the non-authoritative "sunnah of the Muslims" that was followed in practice, and the "Sunnah of the Prophet" that Muslims should follow), sunnah came to mean the Sunnah of Muhammad.

In the Islamic sciences, Burton credits him with "the imposition of a formal theoretical distinction" between 'the Sunnah of the Prophet and the Quran, "especially where the two fundamental sources appeared to clash".

In later legal theory, al-Shāfiʿī is especially associated with a more explicit ranking of legal proofs and a critique of freer reasoning not tightly anchored to scriptural evidence. In particular, he objected to approaches attributed to some early jurists that relied on raʾy and istiḥsān (personal judgment and juristic preference) as methods less closely tied to revealed sources, urging instead a return to demonstrable legal proof (dalīl).

Mu'tazalites

Al-Shāfi‘ī was part of those early traditionalist theologians who strongly opposed i'tizal and criticized the speculative theologians for abandoning the Qur'an and sunnah through their adoption of Greek philosophy in metaphysics.

Structures

Saladin built a madrasa and a shrine on the site of his tomb. Saladin's brother Afdal built a mausoleum for him in 1211 after the defeat of the Fatimids. It remains a site where people petition for justice.

Followers

Among the followers of Imam al-Shāfi‘ī's school were:

- Bayhaqi
- Al-Suyuti
- Al-Dhahabi
- Al-Ghazali
- Ibn Hajar Asqalani
- Ibn Kathir
- Yahya ibn Sharaf al-Nawawi
- Al-Mawardi
- Al Muzani

=== Works ===
He authored more than 100 books, but few survived to this day. The extant works of his which are accessible today are:

- Al-Risala – The best-known book by al-Shafi'i in which he examined principles of jurisprudence. The book has been translated into English.
- Kitab al-Umm – his main surviving text on Shafi'i fiqh
- Musnad al-Shafi'i (on hadith) – it is available with arrangement, Arabic 'Tartib', by Ahmad ibn Abd ar-Rahman al-Banna
- Ikhtilaf al-Hadith
- Al-Sunan al-Ma'thour
- Jima' al-'Ilm

In addition to this, Al-Shāfi‘ī was an eloquent poet, who composed many short poems aimed at addressing morals and behaviour. The most famous of which is his Al-Diwan.

=== Anecdotal stories ===
Ahmad ibn Hanbal considered al-Shafi'i to be the "imam most faithful to tradition, who led the people of tradition (ahl al-ḥadīth), who emphasized transmitted reports, to victory against the exponents of ra'y (independent legal reasoning). In the words of Ibn Hanbal, "at no time was there anyone of importance in learning who erred less, and who followed more closely the sunnah of the Prophet than Al-Shāfi‘ī." Shah Waliullah Dehlawi, an 18th century Sunni Islamic scholar stated: "A mujaddid appears at the end of every century: the mujaddid of the 1st century was the imam of ahl al-sunna, Umar ibn Abd al-Aziz; the mujaddid of the 2nd century was Muhammad ibn Idris Al-Shāfi‘ī; the mujaddid of the 3rd century was Abu al-Hasan al-Ash'ari; the mujaddid of the 4th century was al-Hakim al-Nishapuri."

=== Quotations ===
- He who seeks pearls immerses himself in the sea.
- He said to the effect that no knowledge of Islam can be gained from books of kalam, as it "is not from knowledge" and that "it is better for a man to spend his whole life doing whatever Allah has prohibited—besides shirk with Allah—rather than spending his whole life involved in kalam." (Note: Siyar A'lam Nubala recorded the words of al-Shafi'i as following: Do not be preoccupied with Kalam, since I (have) learned that the Kalam scholars inclined to Ta'thil(rejection of Names of God in Islam) [sic])
- If a hadith is authenticated as coming from the Prophet, we have to resign ourselves to it, and your talk and the talk of others about why and how, is a mistake.

== Islamic scholars ==
Early Islamic scholars

Muhammad, The final Messenger of God (570–632) the Constitution of Medina, taught the Quran, and advised his companions
Abdullah ibn Masud (died 653) taught	Ali (607–661) fourth caliph taught	Aisha, Muhammad's wife and Abu Bakr's daughter taught	Abd Allah ibn Abbas (618–687) taught	Zayd ibn Thabit (610–660) taught	Umar (579–644) second caliph taught	Abu Hurairah (603–681) taught
Alqama ibn Qays (died 681) taught	Husayn ibn Ali (626–680) taught	Qasim ibn Muhammad ibn Abi Bakr (657–725) taught and raised by Aisha	Urwah ibn Zubayr (died 713) taught by Aisha, he then taught	Said ibn al-Musayyib (637–715) taught	Abdullah ibn Umar (614–693) taught	Abd Allah ibn al-Zubayr (624–692) taught by Aisha, he then taught
Ibrahim al-Nakha’i taught	Ali ibn Husayn Zayn al-Abidin (659–712) taught	Hisham ibn Urwah (667–772) taught	Ibn Shihab al-Zuhri (died 741) taught	Salim ibn Abd-Allah ibn Umar taught	Umar ibn Abdul Aziz (682–720) raised and taught by Abdullah ibn Umar
Hammad ibn Abi Sulayman taught	Muhammad al-Baqir (676–733) taught	Farwah bint al-Qasim Jafar's mother
Abu Hanifa (699–767) wrote Al Fiqh Al Akbar and Kitab Al-Athar, jurisprudence followed by Sunni, Sunni Sufi, Barelvi, Deobandi, Zaidiyyah and originally by the Fatimid and taught	Zayd ibn Ali (695–740)	Ja'far bin Muhammad Al-Baqir (702–765) Muhammad and Ali's great great grand son, jurisprudence followed by Shia, he taught	Malik ibn Anas (711–795) wrote Muwatta, jurisprudence from early Medina period now mostly followed by Maliki Sunnis in North Africa, and taught	Al-Waqidi (748–822) wrote history books like Kitab al-Tarikh wa al-Maghazi, student of Malik ibn Anas	Abu Muhammad Abdullah ibn Abdul Hakam (died 829) wrote biographies and history books, student of Malik ibn Anas
Abu Yusuf (729–798) wrote Usul al-fiqh	Muhammad al-Shaybani (749–805)	al-Shafi‘i (767–820) wrote Al-Risala, jurisprudence followed by Shafi'i Sunnis and Sufis, and taught	Ismail ibn Ibrahim	Ali ibn al-Madini (778–849) wrote The Book of Knowledge of the Companions	Ibn Hisham (died 833) wrote early history and As-Sirah an-Nabawiyyah, Muhammad's biography
Isma'il ibn Ja'far (719–775)	Musa al-Kadhim (745–799)	Ahmad ibn Hanbal (780–855) wrote Musnad Ahmad ibn Hanbal jurisprudence followed by Hanbali Sunnis and Sufis	Muhammad al-Bukhari (810–870) wrote Sahih al-Bukhari hadith books	Muslim ibn al-Hajjaj (815–875) wrote Sahih Muslim hadith books	Dawud al-Zahiri (815–883/4) founded the Zahiri school	Muhammad ibn Isa at-Tirmidhi (824–892) wrote Jami` at-Tirmidhi hadith books	Al-Baladhuri (died 892) wrote early history Futuh al-Buldan, Genealogies of the Nobles
Ibn Majah (824–887) wrote Sunan ibn Majah hadith book	Abu Dawood (817–889) wrote Sunan Abu Dawood Hadith Book
Muhammad ibn Ya'qub al-Kulayni (864- 941) wrote Kitab al-Kafi hadith book followed by Twelver Shia	Muhammad ibn Jarir al-Tabari (838–923) wrote History of the Prophets and Kings, Tafsir al-Tabari	Abu al-Hasan al-Ash'ari (874–936) wrote Maqālāt al-islāmīyīn, Kitāb al-luma, Kitāb al-ibāna 'an usūl al-diyāna
Ibn Babawayh (923–991) wrote Man La Yahduruhu al-Faqih jurisprudence followed by Twelver Shia	Sharif Razi (930–977) wrote Nahj al-Balagha followed by Twelver Shia	Nasir al-Din al-Tusi (1201–1274) wrote jurisprudence books followed by Ismaili and Twelver Shia	Al-Ghazali (1058–1111) wrote The Niche for Lights, The Incoherence of the Philosophers, The Alchemy of Happiness on Sufism	Rumi (1207–1273) wrote Masnavi, Diwan-e Shams-e Tabrizi on Sufism
Key: Some of Muhammad's Companions	Key: Taught in Medina	Key: Taught in Iraq	Key: Worked in Syria	Key: Travelled extensively collecting the sayings of Muhammad and compiled books of hadith	Key: Worked in Persia

== See also ==
- Fiqh
- Mujaddid
- Shafi'i
- Mausoleum of Imam al-Shafi'i
