= The Seven Fuqaha of Medina =

Seven Great Islamic scholars of all Time

The Seven Fuqaha of Medina (Arabic: فقهاء المدينة السبعة), commonly referred to as The Seven Fuqaha (Arabic: الفقهاء السبعة), are seven experts in Islamic jurisprudence who lived around the same time in the Islamic holy city of Medina. These seven religious scholars were also muftis and were among the largest contributors to the transmission of hadith in the second generation following the Islamic prophet Muhammad, known as the tabi'un.

The six who are agreed upon as being part of this designation are Sa'id ibn al-Musayyib, Urwa ibn al-Zubayr, Qasim ibn Muhammad ibn Abi Bakr, Ubayd Allah ibn Abd Allah ibn Utbah ibn Mas'ud, Kharija ibn Zayd, and Sulayman ibn Yasar. The identity of the seventh is debated between three persons: Abu Salama ibn Abd al-Rahman ibn Awf, Salim ibn Abd Allah ibn Umar, and Abu Bakr ibn Abd al-Rahman ibn al-Harith ibn Hisham al-Makhzumi. The most popular opinion, voiced by Ibn al-Salah and cited by him as the opinion of most scholars of the Hejaz, is that the seventh faqih in this group is Abu Salama ibn Abd al-Rahman. However, early Islamic scholar Abd Allah ibn al-Mubarak opined that the seventh was Salim ibn Abd Allah. Still, Abu al-Zinad, a tabi' al-tabi'in (member of the generation succeeding the tabi'un) and early hadith narrator viewed the seventh as Abu Bakr ibn Abd al-Rahman al-Makhzumi. This opinion was also voiced by 14th century Islamic scholar Ibn Qayyim al-Jawziyya.

== See also ==
- The Four Companions
- The Seven People of the Cave
- Jafar al Sadiq
