= Tabi' al-Tabi'in =

Successors of the Successors of the Companions of Muhammad

The Tābiʿū al-Tābʿīn (Arabic: تَابِعُو ٱلتَّابِعِينَ, singular Tābiʿ al-Tābʿīn تَابِعُ ٱلتَّابِعِينَ) is the generation of Muslims after the Tābi‘ūn in Islam.

The view of the Sunnis and the Salafis is that the first generation of Muslims are called the companions of Muhammad. The second generation of Muslims are called tābi‘ūn "Successors". The third generation are called tabi‘ū al-tabi‘īn "successors of the Successors". The three generations make up the Salaf-us-Saalih the "Pious Predecessors", of Islam.

== Definition according to the mainstream scholars ==
According to Ahlus Sunnah wal Jamah and mainstream Salafi ulema, person is classified as one of the Tābiʿ al-Tābiʿīn when the following conditions are fulfilled:

1. He was a Muslim.
2. He lived after the generation of the Ṣaḥābah.
3. He personally met at least one recognized Tābiʿī.
4. He learned from, narrated from, or accompanied a Tābiʿī.
5. He did not personally meet the Prophet Muhammad ﷺ.
6. He did not meet any Ṣaḥābī according to the stronger classification used by hadith scholars.
7. His meeting with the Tābiʿī is historically verified through reliable chains, biographical works, or accepted reports.
8. He belonged chronologically to the third virtuous generation (al-qurūn al-mufaḍḍalah).
9. Hadith and rijāl scholars recognized him as being from the generation of the Tābiʿ al-Tābiʿīn.

The Sahih Bukhari, the most authentic collection of Hadiths in Islam, asserts that Muhammad said, "The best people are those living in my generation, then those coming after them, and then those coming after."

== List of Tābiʿ al-Tābʿīn ==
- Sufyan al-Thawri
- Sufyan ibn ʽUyaynah
- Malik ibn Anas
- Abu Yusuf
- Muhammad al-Shaybani
- Abd al-Rahman al-Awza'i
- Abd Allah ibn al-Mubarak
- Al-Shafi'i
- Zayd ibn Ali
- Al-Layth ibn Sa'd
- Hammad bin Zayd
- Makki ibn Ibrahim
- Al-Fudayl ibn 'Iyad
- Dawud al-Ta'i
- Sari al-Saqati
- Abdullah Shah Ghazi
- Muhammad al-Bukhari
- Ahmad ibn Hanbal
- Yahya ibn Ma'in
- Ishaq ibn Rahwayh
- Ahmad ibn Hanbal

== See also ==
- Ahl al-Bayt
- Sahaba
- Tabi'un
