= Sa'ib Khathir =

Persian musician (died 683)

- Died: 683
- Occupation: Musician
- Years active: Early days of the Umayyad Caliphate (661–750)
- Known for: Introducing music to Medina

Sa'ib Khathir (died 683) was an influential Persian musician in the early days of the Umayyad Caliphate (661–750). A freedman (mawla), Sa'ib was responsible for introducing music to Medina. He was killed during the Battle of al-Harra.

== Sources ==
- Faizer, Rizwi (2006). Meri, Josef W. (ed.). Medieval Islamic Civilization: An Encyclopedia (Vol. 1, A-K, Index). Routledge. ISBN 978-1135455965.
- Meyers Sawa, Suzanne M. (2013). "ʿAzza al-Maylāʾ". In Fleet, Kate; Krämer, Gudrun; Matringe, Denis; Nawas, John; Rowson, Everett (eds.). Encyclopaedia of Islam (3rd ed.). Brill Online. ISSN 1873-9830.
- Wright, O. (1995). "Ṣāʾib K̲h̲āt̲h̲ir". In Bosworth, C. E.; van Donzel, E.; Heinrichs, W. P. & Lecomte, G. (eds.). The Encyclopaedia of Islam, Second Edition. Volume VIII: Ned–Sam. Leiden: E. J. Brill. ISBN 978-90-04-09834-3.
- Zelli, Bijan (2017). "Zaryab: The Cultural Meeting of East and West". In Grajter, Małgorzata (ed.). The Orient in Music - Music of the Orient. Cambridge Scholars Publishing. ISBN 978-1527510265.
