= Said ibn al-Musayyib =

Medina-based Muslim scholar (637–715)

Personal life
- Born: 637 CE Hejaz, Arabia (present day KSA)
- Died: 715 (aged 77–78)
- Parent: Al-Musayyib ibn Hazn al-Makhzumi (father)
- Era: Rashidun Era, Umayyad Era
- Region: Medina
- Main interest(s): Fiqh; tafsir, hadith (his students)
- Notable work: oral only

Religious life
- Religion: Islam
- Jurisprudence: His fiqh transmitted by the Syrian and Medinan schools

Muslim leader
- Influenced: al-Zuhri, Malik ibn Anas, Yahya ibn Sa‘id al-Ansari, Umar II

Abu Muhammad Sa'id ibn al-Musayyib ibn Hazn al-Makhzumi (Arabic: سعید بن المسیب, romanized: Saʿīd ibn al-Musayyib; 637–715) was one of the foremost authorities of jurisprudence (fiqh) among the taba'een (generation succeeding the companions of Muhammad who are referred to as the sahaba). He was based in Medina. He is the only tabi whose all hadith narration are acceptionally trustworthy despite being mursal. In Shia sources, he is counted among the close companions of Ali al-Sajjad, and was reportedly praised by the latter.

== Life and contribution to Islamic learning ==
Sa'id was born in 637, the son of al-Musayyib ibn Hazn of the Banu Makhzum clan of the Quraysh tribe. He was born during the caliphate of Umar (r. 634–644) and met most of the sahaba, including Umar's successors Uthman (r. 644–656) and Ali (r. 656–661). Sa'id was well known for his piety, righteousness and profound devotion to Allah; as for his stature among Sunni Muslims, he is renowned as the most eminent of The Seven Fuqaha of Medina. He began, as did Hasan al-Basri in Basra, to give opinions and deliver verdicts on legal matters when he was around twenty years of age. The Companions admired him greatly. On one occasion, Abdullah ibn Umar remarked, "If [Muhammad] had seen that young man, he would have been very pleased with him."

Sa'id married the daughter of Abu Hurayrah in order to be closer to him and to learn better the hadiths (traditions of the Islamic prophet Muhammad and his companions) that he narrated. The two had a daughter. Sa'id had her play not with dolls, but with drums; later she learnt to cook.

During the Battle of al-Harra and the subsequent takeover of Medina by the Syrian troops of the Umayyad caliph Yazid I in 683, Sa'id was the one Medinese who prayed in the Prophet's mosque. After Yazid died, he refused to take the oath of allegiance to the Mecca-based, anti-Umayyad caliph Abd Allah ibn al-Zubayr. After the Umayyad Abd al-Malik had reconquered the Caliphate, including Medina, he requested Sa'id marry his daughter (born of his marriage to Abu Hurayra's daughter) to Abd al-Malik's son and future caliph Hisham. Sa'id refused and, in the face of increasing pressures and threats, he offered her to Ibn Abi Wada', who stayed in the madrasa. In 705, Abd al-Malik commanded his governors to enforce the oath of allegiance to his son al-Walid I as his successor. Sa'id refused. Hisham ibn Isma'il al-Makhzumi, the governor of Medina, gaoled him and had him beaten daily until the stick was broken, but he did not yield. When his friends, such as Masruq ibn al-Ajda' and Tawus, advised him to consent to al-Walid's caliphate to spare himself further torture, he answered: "People follow us in acting. If we consent, how will we be able to explain this to them?" Hisham's successor Umar II (a maternal grandson of Umar), who governed Medina in 706–712, on the other hand consulted Sa'id in all of his executive decisions.

=== Hadith ===
Those who received Islamic rulings and Traditions from Sa'id include Umar II, Qatadah, al-Zuhri and Yahya ibn Sa'id al-Ansari, among others.

Sa'id was from Ahle Hadith School of thought Qur'an. He did not treat the hadith as a science with isnads (chains of transmission) in the way of those after him (especially al-Zuhri). As a result, many of his rulings have been equipped with spurious isnads and converted into hadiths. It is similar with tafsir (Qur'anic interpretation): Sa'id argued his points from the Qur'an, but refused to expound on verses for their own context or meaning. To the extent a "tafsir of Ibn al-Musayyib" ever existed it was compiled by his students based on his rulings.

The leading jurisprudents Malik ibn Anas and al-Shafi'i took as unquestionably authentic the hadiths that Sa'id narrated from Umar or Muhammad as authentic, without mentioning from whom he received them. In their view, Sa'id was of the same rank as the sahaba in knowledge and narration of hadiths.

== See also ==
- Salaf
