= Al-Risala (al-Shafi'i book) =

Fiqh book by ash-Shafi'i

Arabic-language cover of the Risāla (Library of Arabic Literature, 2013)

See Risala (disambiguation) for other books known as "Ar-Risala".

The Risāla by al-Shafi'i (d. 820), full title Kitab ar-Risāla fī Uṣūl al-Fiqh (Arabic: كتاب الرسالة في أصول الفقه, "The Book of the Treatise on the Principles of Jurisprudence"), is a seminal text on the principles of Islamic jurisprudence.

The word risāla in Arabic means a "message" or "letter". Shafi'i's treatise received its name owing to a traditional, though unverified, story that Shafi'i composed the work in response to a request from a leading traditionist in Basra, ‘Abd al-Raḥmān bin Mahdī; the story goes that Ibn Mahdī wanted Shafi'i to explain the legal significance of the Quran and the sunna, and the Risāla was Shafi'i's response.

In this work, al-Shafi'i is said to have outlined four sources of Islamic law, though this division based on four has been attributed to later commentators on the work rather than to Shafi'i himself.

== Contents ==
1. Introduction
2. On al-Bayān (Perspicuous Declaration)
3. On Legal Knowledge
4. On the Book of God
5. On the Obligation of Man to Accept the Authority of the Prophet
6. On the Abrogation of Divine Legislation
7. On Duties
8. On the Nature of God's Orders of Prohibition and the Prophet's Orders of Prohibition
9. On Traditions
10. On Single-Individual Traditions
11. On Consensus (Ijmā‘)
12. On Analogy (Qiyās)
13. On Personal Reasoning (Ijtihād)
14. On Juristic Preference (Istiḥsān)
15. On Disagreement (Ikhtilaf)

The above list of contents follows Khadduri's translation. However, Khadduri rearranged the treatise in two places. Khadduri's chapters 8 and 3 (in that order) both follow Shafi'i's chapter on Traditions in the original. Khadduri rearranged those chapters because they did "not appear to fit into the logical order of the book." Therefore, if one wishes to read Khadduri's translation while following Shafi'i's original arrangement, one can read the chapters in the following order: 1, 2, 4, 5, 6, 7, 9, 8, 3, 10, 11, 12, 13, 14, 15.

== Sources of law in Al-Risāla ==
The primary sources of law attributed to Shafi'is book are the Qur'an and the prophetic tradition. Most Muslim commentators have also referred to Shafi'is sections on consensus and analogical reason as comprising legal sources.

On the question of consensus, Shafi'i obligated affirmation of all living Muslims - both the learned and the laymen - in order to declare a true consensus. Later followers of his school considered this to be practically impossible, and thus expanded upon the definition.

== Translations ==
An English translation of the Risāla by Joseph E. Lowry was published in 2013 by the Library of Arabic Literature, printed alongside an Arabic edition of the text in a facing-page translation, under the title The Epistle on Legal Theory.
