= Umm Farwa =

Grand-daughter of Muhammad ibn Abi Bakr

Umm Farwa أم فروة
- Born: Medina, Umayyad Caliphate
- Died: Medina, Umayyad Caliphate
- Burial place: Al-Baqi', Medina, Saudi Arabia
- Era: Umayyad Era
- Spouse: Muhammad al-Baqir
- Children: Ja'far; Abd Allah
- Parents: Al-Qāsim ibn Muhammad ibn Abi Bakr (father); Asma bint Abd al-Rahman ibn Abi Bakr (mother)
- Family: Family of Abu Bakr (by birth); Family of Ali (by marriage)

Fāṭima bint al-Qāsim (Arabic: فاطمة بنت القاسم), commonly known by her kunya Umm Farwa (Arabic: أم فروة), was the wife of the fifth Imam Muhammad al-Baqir and the mother of his successor, Ja'far al-Sadiq. She was also the great-granddaughter of the Rashidun caliph Abu Bakr.

== Family ==
Umm Farwa's father was the Islamic jurist Al-Qasim, son of Muhammad ibn Abi Bakr. Her mother was Asma, daughter of Abd al-Rahman ibn Abi Bakr. Umm Farwa was therefore a great-granddaughter of Abu Bakr, the first Rashidun Caliph, twice-over. She also had another son named Abd Allah ibn Muhammad al-Baqir.

== Knowledge ==
She is a notable woman for her knowledge in Islamic history. She is among the Imamiyyat (the women of the Ahl al-Bayt and the companions of the Imams) narrators of the hadith and narrated on the authority of Imam Ali al-Sajjad.

== Ancestry ==
Ancestors of Umm Farwa

8. Abu Bakr (= 12)
4. Muhammad ibn Abi Bakr
9. Asma bint Umais
2. Al-Qasim ibn Muhammad
1. Umm Farwa
12. Abu Bakr (= 8)
6. Abd al-Rahman ibn Abi Bakr
13. Umm Ruman bint Amir
3. Asma bint Abd al-Rahman
