= Genealogies of the Nobles =

Book on the history and genealogy of Arabs by Ahmad Ibn Yahya al-Baladhuri

- Author: Ahmad Ibn Yahya al-Baladhuri
- Original title: أنساب الأشراف
- Language: Arabic
- Subject: History, Genealogy
- Genre: Non-fiction
- Publisher: Various (modern editions include Dar al-Yaqazah)
- Publication date: 9th century
- Publication place: Abbasid Caliphate
- Media type: Manuscript, Print

Genealogies of the Nobles (Arabic: أنساب الأشراف; transliterated: Ansab al-Ashraf) is a book on the history and genealogy of Arabs, authored by Ahmad Ibn Yahya al-Baladhuri (d. 892 CE). The book includes stories about pre-Islamic Arabian kings, poets, and warriors, as well as the history of Rashidun, Umayyad, and Abbasid Caliphs.

== Overview ==
This was the second great historical work of al-Baladhuri, of which he is said to have written forty parts when he died. Of this work the eleventh book has been published by Wilhelm Ahlwardt (Greifswald, 1883), and another part is known in manuscript (see Journal of the German Oriental Society [Zeitschrift der Deutschen Morgenländischen Gesellschaft], vol. xxxviii, pp. 382–406).

The modern publication history of the 'Ansab' is a complicated one; several teams of editors have worked on separate, rival editions. The only complete edition is the new Damascus one (Dar al-Yaqazah, 1996-), published in 25 volumes.

== See also ==
- Tribes of Arabia
