= Ismail ibn Ibrahim =

Father of Imam Bukhari (756 – 810)

- Born: December 9, 756 CE
- Died: December 26, 810 CE (aged 54)
- Children: Muhammad al-Bukhari

Ismail Ibn Ibrahim (Arabic: اسماعيل بن ابراهيم) (756 – 810) was most notable for being the father of Muhammad al-Bukhari. Ismail ibn Ibrahim died in 810, when Bukhari was only an infant, not yet 1 year old.

== Biography ==
=== Ancestry ===
Ismail's ancestry can be traced to a farmer named Bardizbah who lived in the vicinity of Bukhara. Bardizbah's had a son named al-Mugheerah who accepted Islam.

Mugheerah eventually had a son named Ibrahim, the father of Ismail Ibn Ibrahim.

=== Life ===
Ismail Ibn Ibrahim became a known scholar of Hadith, praised by Muslims as a man of great piety and sound reputation. Scrupulous in his habits, he is said to have mentioned on his deathbed that in all he possessed there was not a penny which had not been earned by his own honest labour.

Ismael also married and had two sons, Ahmad and Muhammad. Muhammad would later be known as Imam Bukhari, the most prominent Sunni hadith collector.

=== Death ===
When Imam Bukhari was only an infant, Ismail died at the age of 54. He left a considerable fortune to his widow and two sons.
