= Muhammad al-Bukhari =

Islamic hadith scholar (810–870)

Imam Al-Bukhari
- البخاري
- A sketch representing Muhammad al-Bukhari from a book entitled Sayr mulhimah: min al-Sharq wa-al-Gharb by unknown author, 1961
- Title: Amir al-Mu'minin fi al-Hadith

Personal life
- Born: 21 July 810 C.E; 13 Shawwal 194 AH Bukhara, Abbasid Caliphate
- Died: 1 September 870 (aged 60); 1 Shawwal 256 AH Khartank, Samarkand, Abbasid Caliphate
- Resting place: Memorial Complex of Imam al-Bukhari in Samarkand, Uzbekistan
- Era: Islamic Golden Age (Abbasid era)
- Region: Abbasid Caliphate
- Main interest(s): Hadith, Aqidah
- Notable work(s): Sahih al-Bukhari al-Adab al-Mufrad al-Tarikh al-Kabir; Juz Rafa Ul Yadain

Religious life
- Religion: Islam
- Denomination: Sunni
- School: Mujtahid
- Creed: See School of Law and Theology

Muslim leader
- Influenced by: Al-Shafi'i; Ahmad ibn Hanbal; Ishaq ibn Rahwayh; Yahya ibn Ma'in; Ali ibn al-Madini; Naim ibn Hammad; Ibn Abi Shaybah
- Influenced: Muslim ibn al-Hajjaj; Ibn Khuzayma; Al-Nasa'i; Al-Tirmidhi; Ibn Abi al-Dunya; Ibn Abi Asim
- Arabic name
- Personal (Ism): Muḥammad مُحَمَّد
- Patronymic (Nasab): Ibn Ismāʿīl ibn Ibrāhīm ibn al-Mughīrah ibn Bardizbah ٱبْن إِسْمَاعِيل ٱبْن إِبْرَاهِيم ٱبْن ٱلْمُغِيرَة ٱبْن بَرْدِزْبَه
- Teknonymic (Kunya): Abū ʿAbdillāh أَبُو عَبْدِ ٱللَّه
- Toponymic (Nisba): Al-Bukhārī al-Juʿfī ٱلْبُخَارِيّ ٱلْجُعْفِيّ

Abū ʿAbd Allāh Muḥammad ibn Ismāʿīl ibn Ibrāhīm al-Juʿfī al-Bukhārī (Arabic: أبو عبد الله محمد بن إسماعيل بن إبرهيم الجعفي البخاري; 21 July 810 C.E – 1 September 870; AH 194–256), commonly known as al-Bukhārī, was a Persian Tajik 9th-century Muslim muhaddith and one of the foremost authorities on hadith, widely regarded as the most important hadith scholar in the history of Sunni Islam.

Born in Bukhara, in present-day Uzbekistan, he began studying hadith at the age of ten and became noted for his exceptional memory. He travelled extensively throughout the Abbasid Caliphate in search of traditions and studied under numerous influential contemporary scholars. He is said to have interviewed about a thousand shaykhs and examined more than 200,000 hadiths, rejecting many after careful scrutiny at a time when numerous spurious traditions were in circulation.

Al-Bukhārī memorized thousands of hadith narrations and compiled his principal collection, the Ṣaḥīḥ al-Bukhārī, in 846 C.E. The work selected 7563 narrations including repetitions, from over 600,000 narrations, but fewer than 3,000 when repeated material is excluded; its contents are arranged principally by subject for ease of reference in ninety-seven "books", subdivided into 3,450 chapters. He spent the remainder of his life teaching the traditions he had collected. Near the end of his life he was exiled from Nishapur and subsequently moved to Khartank, near Samarkand.

The Ṣaḥīḥ al-Bukhārī became the most highly revered hadith collection in Sunni Islam. Together with the Ṣaḥīḥ of al-Bukhārī's student Muslim ibn al-Hajjaj (d. 875; AH 261), it is known collectively as the Ṣaḥīḥayn (Arabic: صحيحين, romanized: Saḥiḥayn). The two collections are regarded by Sunnis as the principal definitive compilations of reliable hadith and, after the Qurʾān, as authoritative sources for principles of legislation and religious practice. Ṣaḥīḥ al-Bukhārī is also one of the Kutub al-Sittah, the six most highly regarded Sunni hadith collections. Among al-Bukhārī's other extant works are al-Tarikh al-Kabir and al-Adab al-Mufrad.

== Sources of biography ==
Al-Bukhari's life is reconstructed primarily from contemporary accounts and biographical compendia written in the 3rd–4th centuries AH (9th–10th centuries CE).

The single most important source is Shamāʾil al-Bukhārī, a now-lost monograph by his personal scribe Abū Jaʿfar al-Warrāq, documenting al-Bukhari's life. Al-Warrāq's association with him spanned two periods: before 239 AH until al-Bukhari's second journey to Iraq (~243 AH), and from his return to Bukhara in 253 AH until shortly before his death in 256 AH. The work combined al-Warrāq's eyewitness accounts with external reports of events from other people, and circulated in two successive recensions, the second containing substantial additions.

Other early contemporary notices include Aḥmad ibn Sayyār al-Marwazī's (d. 268 AH) lost history of Khurasan, the earliest mention of al-Bukhari, and Ibn Abī Ḥātim's Al-Jarḥ wa-al-Taʿdīl (d. 327 AH), the earliest surviving notice, covering his stay in Rayy and the theological dispute over recitation of the Quran. Specialized narrator compendia of his biography include Ibn ʿAdī's (d. 365 AH) Mashāyikh al-Bukhārī, alongside notices by al-Nasāʾī (d. 303 AH), Ibn Yūnus al-Miṣrī (d. 347 AH), Ibn Ḥibbān (d. 354 AH), Ibn al-Nadīm (d. 385 AH), and Abū Aḥmad al-Ḥākim (d. 378 AH).

Though lost today, the Shamāʾil was extensively cited in the major biographic compendia of al-Khaṭīb al-Baghdādī (d. 463 AH), Ibn ʿAsākir (d. 571 AH), and al-Samʿānī. Both recensions were utilized by al-Dhahabī (d. 748 AH) across his historical works, and served as Ibn Ḥajar's main source for the biographical introduction of Hady al-Sari.

== Life ==
=== Ancestry and early life ===
Muhammad ibn Ismail al-Bukhari al-Ju'fi was born after the Friday prayer on Friday, 21 July 810 (13 Shawwal 194 AH) in the city of Bukhara in Greater Khorasan in present-day Uzbekistan. He was of Persian descent and his father was Ismail ibn Ibrahim, a scholar of hadith and a student of Malik ibn Anas, Abd Allah ibn al-Mubarak, and Hammad ibn Salamah. Ismail died while Al-Bukhari was an infant. Al-Bukhari's great-grandfather, Al-Mughirah, settled in Bukhara after accepting Islam at the hands of Bukhara's governor, Yaman al-Ju'fi. As was the custom, he became a mawla of Yaman, and his family continued to carry the nisba "al-Ju'fi."

Al-Mughirah's father, Bardizbah (Persian: بردزبه), is the earliest known ancestor of Al-Bukhari according to most scholars and historians. Bardizbah was a Zoroastrian Magi. Taqi al-Din al-Subki is the only scholar to name Bardizbah's father, who he says was named Bazzabah (Persian: بذذبه). Little is known of both of them except that they were Persian and followed the religion of their people. Historians have also not come across any information on Al-Bukhari's grandfather, Ibrahim ibn al-Mughirah (Arabic: إبراهيم ابن المغيرة, romanized: Ibrāhīm ibn al-Mughīrā).

=== Travels and education ===
According to contemporary hadith scholar and historian Al-Dhahabi, al-Bukhari began studying hadith in the Hijri year 821 CE. He memorized the works of Abd Allah ibn al-Mubarak while still a child and began writing and narrating hadith while still an adolescent. In the Hijri year 826 CE, at the age of sixteen, Al-Bukhari performed the Hajj with his elder brother and widowed mother. Al-Bukhari stayed in Mecca for two years, before moving to Medina where he wrote Qadhāyas-Sahābah wa at-Tābi'īn, a book about the companions of Muhammad and the tabi'un. He also wrote Al-Tārīkh al-Kabīr during his time in Medina.

Al-Bukhari is known to have travelled to most of the important Islamic learning centres of his time, including Syria, Kufa, Basra, Egypt, Yemen, and Baghdad. He studied under prominent Islamic scholars including Ahmad ibn Hanbal, Ali ibn al-Madini, Yahya ibn Ma'in and Ishaq ibn Rahwayh. Al-Bukhari is known to have memorized over 600,000 hadith narrations.

=== Mihna, later years and death ===
“The Qur'an is God’s speech, uncreated, and the acts of men are created."

— Al-Bukhari

According to Jonathan Brown, following Ibn Hanbal, Al-Bukhari had reportedly declared that 'reciting the Quran is an element of createdness’. Through this assertion, Al-Bukhari had sought an alternative response to the doctrines of Mu'tazilites and declared that the element of creation is applied only to humans, not the Word of God. His statements were received negatively by prominent hadith scholars and he was driven out of Nishapur. Al-Bukhari, however, had only referred to the human action of reading the Qur’an, when he reportedly stated "My recitation of the Quran is created" (Arabic: لفظي بالقرآن مخلوق, romanized: Lafẓī bil-Qur'āni Makhlūq) Al-Dhahabi and Taj al-Din al-Subki asserted that Al-Bukhari was expelled due to the jealousy of certain scholars of Nishapur. Al-Bukhari spent the last twenty-four years of his life teaching the hadith he had collected. During the mihna, he fled to Khartank, a village near Samarkand, where he then also died on Friday, 1 September 870. Today his tomb lies within the Imam Bukhari Mausoleum in Hartang, Uzbekistan, 25 kilometers from Samarkand. It was restored in 1998 after centuries of neglect and dilapidation. The mausoleum complex consists of Al-Bukhari's tomb, a mosque, a madrasa, library, and a small collection of Qurans. The modern ground-level mausoleum tombstone of Al-Bukhari is only a cenotaph, the actual grave lies within a small crypt below the structure.

== Works ==
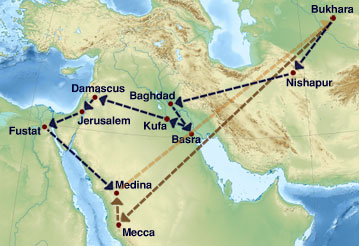
Al-Bukhari's travels seeking and studying hadith.

Sahih al-Bukhari is considered Al-Bukhari's magnum opus. It is a collection of approximately 7,563 hadith narrations across 97 chapters creating a basis for a complete system of jurisprudence without the use of speculative law. The book is highly regarded among Sunni Muslims, and most Sunni scholars consider it second only to the Quran in terms of authenticity. It is considered one of the most authentic collection of hadith, even ahead of Muwatta Imam Malik and Sahih Muslim. Alongside the latter, Sahih al-Bukhari is known as one of the 'Sahihayn (Two Sahihs)' and they are together part of the Kutub al-Sittah.

Al-Bukhari wrote multiple works discussing narrators of hadith. His major biographical compendium is Al-Tārīkh al-Kabīr, alongside an abridged chronological history known as Al-Mukhtaṣar min al-Tārīkh (also known as Al-Tārīkh al-Awsaṭ and Al-Tārīkh al-Ṣaghīr). Al-Dhahabi quotes Al-Bukhari as having said, “When I turned eighteen years old, I began writing about the companions and the tabi'un and their statements. [...] At that time I also authored a book of history at the grave of the Prophet at night during a full moon." The books being referred to here were Qadāyā al-Ṣaḥābah wa al-Tābiʿīn and Al-Tārīkh al-Kabīr. Al-Bukhari also authored Kitāb al-Kunā on patronymics, and Al-Ḍuʿafāʾ al-Ṣaghīr on weak narrators. Al-Adab al-Mufrad is his dedicated collection of hadith narrations on ethics and manners.

In response to the accusations levied against him during his mihna, Al-Bukhari compiled the treatise Khalq Afʿāl al-ʿIbād, the earliest traditionalist representation of the position taken by Ahmad ibn Hanbal, in which Al-Bukhari explains that the Quran is God's uncreated speech, while maintaining that God creates human actions, as the Sunnis had insisted in their attacks on the free-will position of Qadariyah. The first section of the book reports narrations from earlier scholars such as Sufyan al-Thawri that affirmed the Sunni doctrine of the uncreated nature of the Quran and condemned anyone who held the contrary position as a Jahmi or Kāfir. The second section asserts that the acts of men are created, relying on Qur'anic verses and reports from earlier traditionalist scholars like Yahya ibn Sa'id al-Qattan. In the last part of his treatise, Al-Bukhari harshly condemned the Muʿtazilites, defending the belief that the sound of the Qur'an being recited is created. Al-Bukhari cited Ahmad Ibn Hanbal as evidence for his position, re-affirming the latter's legacy and the former's allegiance to the Ahl al-Hadith.

== List of Works ==
The following is a list of Al-Bukhari's works:

=== Extant works ===
- Al-Adab al-Mufrad (The Singular Book of Manners, also known as Al-Adab).

Al-Bukhari published it in Bukhara after leaving Nishapur. It was transmitted from him by Abū al-Khayr Aḥmad ibn Muḥammad ibn al-Jalīl al-ʿAbsī al-Karminī al-Bukhārī.

- Al-Jāmiʿ al-Ṣaḥīḥ (The Authentic Comprehensive Collection).

Referred to by the author as Al-Jāmiʿ and Al-Ṣaḥīḥ. Al-Bukhari published it first in Firabr after leaving Nishapur, and once again in Nasaf after his expulsion from Bukhara in Ramaḍān 256 AH. Its principal transmitters, in chronological order, are:

1. Muḥammad ibn Yūsuf al-Firabrī (extant recension).
2. Ibrāhīm ibn Maʿqil al-Nasafī.
3. Ḥammād ibn Shākir al-Nasafī.
- Khalq Afʿāl al-ʿIbād (The Creation of the Acts of Servants).

Published in Bukhara in 256 AH. It was transmitted from him by al-Firabrī (extant) and Ibn Rayḥān (lost).

- Rafʿ al-Yadayn fī al-Ṣalāh (Raising the Hands in Prayer).

Published in Bukhara after leaving Nishapur. Transmitted from him by Abū Isḥāq Maḥmūd ibn Isḥāq al-Qawwās al-Khuzāʿī al-Bukhārī.

- Al-Qirāʾah Khalf al-Imām (Recitation Behind the Prayer Leader).

Published in Bukhara after leaving Nishapur. Transmitted from him by Abū Isḥāq Maḥmūd ibn Isḥāq al-Qawwās al-Khuzāʿī al-Bukhārī.

- Iʿtiqād al-Bukhārī (The Creed of al-Bukhārī).

A short doctrinal treatise preserved via transmission. Dictated or written by Al-Bukhari and transmitted by ʿAbd al-Raḥmān ibn Muḥammad ibn ʿAbd al-Raḥmān al-Bukhārī, who heard it in 256 AH.

- Birr al-Wālidayn (Dutifulness to Parents).

Published in Nishapur during his residence there. Transmitted from him by Abū Bakr Muḥammad ibn Aḥmad ibn Dalwayh al-Daqqāq al-Naysābūrī.

- Al-Tārīkh al-Kabīr (The Large History, also known simply as Al-Tārīkh).

Arranged alphabetically. Composed in Medina in 212 AH at the age of eighteen, and examined by Isḥāq ibn Rāhawayh around 224 AH. Its transmitters, in chronological order, are:

Transmitter	Location	Date	Status
Abū ʿĪsā al-Tirmidhī	Bukhara	Before 241 AH	Cited in his Sunan and ʿIlal
Faḍlak al-Rāzī	Near Baghdad	c. 243 AH	Cited in works of Rāzī scholars
Ibn Sahl	Basra	246 AH	Extant (with some lacunae)
Yaḥyā ibn Ṣāʿid	Baghdad	248–250 AH	Lost
Ibn Fāris and others	Nishapur	250–252 AH	Partially extant
ʿAbd al-Raḥmān ibn al-Faḍl al-Fasawī	Firabr or Bukhara	253–256 AH	Partially extant
Musabbiḥ ibn Saʿīd al-Bukhārī	Bukhara	253–256 AH	Fully extant
Muḥammad ibn Wāṣil al-Baykandī	Baykand	253–256 AH	Cited by al-Ḥākim, and possibly al-Kalābādhī and Mughulṭāy

- Kitāb al-Kunā (The Book of Patronymics).

A complementary companion work to Al-Tārīkh al-Kabīr. Its transmitters are:

Transmitter	Location	Date	Status
Faḍlak al-Rāzī (transmitted alongside Al-Tārīkh)	Near Baghdad	c. 243 AH	Cited in works of Rāzī scholars
Ibn Sahl (transmitted alongside Al-Tārīkh)	Basra	246 AH	Cited by Ibn al-ʿAdīm
Muḥammad ibn Ibrāhīm al-Ghāzī (standalone recension)	Basra (approx.)	246–247 AH	Extant

- Al-Mukhtaṣar min al-Tārīkh (The Abridgement of the History, also known as Al-Tārīkh al-Awsaṭ and Al-Tārīkh al-Ṣaghīr).

Its full title is Al-Mukhtaṣar min Tārīkh Hijrat Rasūlillāh ﷺ wa al-Muhājirīn wa al-Anṣār, wa Ṭabaqāt al-Tābiʿīn bi-Iḥsān wa man Baʿdahum wa Wafātihim wa Baʿḍ Nasabihim wa Kunāhum wa man Yurghab ʿan Ḥadīthih. Arranged by generations and years. Published successively in Basra, Baghdad, Nishapur, and Bukhara. Its transmitters, in chronological order, are:

Transmitter	Location	Date	Status
Ibn Sahl	Basra	243–247 AH	Cited by Ḥamzah al-Sahmī
Ibn al-Ashqar	Baghdad	248 AH	Cited by al-Khaṭīb al-Baghdādī, Ibn ʿAsākir, and others
Al-Khaffāf	Nishapur	250 AH	Extant
Zanjawayh	Nishapur	251 AH	Extant
Ibn Fāris and others	Nishapur	250–252 AH	Cited by Abū Aḥmad al-Ḥākim
Ibn al-Faḍl al-Fasawī	Firabr or Bukhara	253–256 AH	Cited by Mughulṭāy
Jaʿfar ibn Nadhīr al-Karminī	Bukhara	253–256 AH	Possibly cited by al-Kalābādhī

- Al-Ḍuʿafāʾ al-Ṣaghīr (The Small Book of Weak Narrators).

The smaller of two treatises Al-Bukhari authored on weak narrators. Its transmitters, in chronological order, are:

Transmitter	Location	Date	Status
Muḥammad ibn Ibrāhīm ibn Shuʿayb al-Ghāzī	Basra (approx.)	246–247 AH	Cited by Abū Aḥmad al-Ḥākim and al-Khaṭīb al-Baghdādī
Ādam ibn Mūsā al-Khawārī	Khawār al-Rayy	250 AH	Extant
Muḥammad ibn Muḥammad al-Rāwsānī al-Naysābūrī	Nishapur	250–252 AH	Cited by al-Bayhaqī
Musabbiḥ ibn Saʿīd al-Bukhārī	Bukhara	253–256 AH	Partially extant

=== Lost works ===
- Al-Ḍuʿafāʾ al-Kabīr (The Large Book of Weak Narrators).

The lost, larger compilation on weak narrators. Its transmissions include:

Transmitter	Location	Date	Status
Al-Dawlābī	Baghdad (approx.)	248–250 AH	Cited by Ibn ʿAdī
Ādam ibn Mūsā al-Khawārī	Khawār al-Rayy	250 AH	Cited by al-ʿUqaylī
Unknown	—	—	Cited by al-Mizzī, al-Dhahabī, and others

- Al-Ashribah (Beverages).

Mentioned and quoted by al-Dāraquṭnī. Likely a standalone thematic work modeled on Al-Adab al-Mufrad.

- Aṣḥāb al-Nabī ﷺ (The Companions of the Prophet ﷺ, also known as Asāmī al-Ṣaḥābah, Al-Wuḥdān min al-Ṣaḥābah, and Man Laysa lahu illā Ḥadīthun Wāḥid min al-Ṣaḥābah).

Published in Baghdad, where it was transmitted by Abū Bakr ibn Ṣadaqah al-Baghdādī and Abū Bishr ibn Ḥammād al-Dawlābī; and in Nishapur, where it was transmitted by Abū Aḥmad ibn Fāris. Quoted by al-Baghawī, al-Ṭabarānī, Abū Nuʿaym, and others.

- Al-Iʿtiṣām (Holding Fast, also cited as Kitāb al-Iʿtiṣām bi-al-Sunnah by al-Ḥākim).

Referenced by Al-Bukhari in his Ṣaḥīḥ (no. 7271): "Refer to the original copy of Kitāb al-Iʿtiṣām." Ibn Ḥajar noted that Al-Bukhari composed it as a standalone work and only transcribed selected narrations meeting his stricter criteria into the Ṣaḥīḥ.

- Intiqāʾ al-Bukhārī min Ḥadīthihi li-Ahl Baghdād (Al-Bukhārī's Selection from His Hadiths for the People of Baghdad).

Produced in Nishapur. Transmitted by Abū Muḥammad ʿAbdullāh ibn Muḥammad ibn al-Sharqī al-Naysābūrī.

- Al-Tafsīr (Quranic Commentary).

Likely a work resembling Al-Adab al-Mufrad.

- Al-ʿIlal (Concealed Defects [in Hadith]).

Produced in Nishapur and transmitted by Abū Muḥammad ʿAbdullāh ibn Muḥammad ibn al-Sharqī al-Naysābūrī.

- Al-Fawāʾid (Beneficial [Hadith Notes]).

Mentioned by al-Tirmidhī in his Sunan (no. 3742).

- Ṣaḥīfat Ismāʿīl ibn Abī Uways (The Sahifah of Ismāʿīl ibn Abī Uways).

Cited by Ibn Ḥibbān. Contained eighty hadiths narrated via the chain: Al-Bukhari $\rightarrow$ Ismāʿīl ibn Abī Uways $\rightarrow$ his brother $\rightarrow$ Sulaymān ibn Bilāl $\rightarrow$ Yaḥyā ibn Saʿīd al-Anṣārī $\rightarrow$ al-Zuhrī.

- Al-Mabsūṭ (The Expansive Compilation).

Published in Bukhara after leaving Nishapur. Transmitted solely by Muhayb ibn Sulaym al-Karminī. Ibn Ṭāhir stated that Al-Bukhari composed it before Al-Jāmiʿ al-Ṣaḥīḥ, and that several of his standalone thematic works were likely separated from it.

- Al-Hibah (Gifts).

Recorded by his copyist, who reported Al-Bukhari stating: "In Wakīʿ's book on gifts there are only two or three musnad hadiths, and in ʿAbdullāh ibn al-Mubārak's book there are five or thereabouts, whereas in this book of mine there are five hundred hadiths or more."

- Qadāyā al-Ṣaḥābah wa al-Tābiʿīn wa-Aqāwīluhum (The Legal Cases and Opinions of the Companions and Successors).

Composed in Medina in 212 AH when Al-Bukhari was eighteen; recognized as his earliest authored work. He likely never publicly transmitted it.

=== Other lost works ===
Al-Khalīlī noted that Muhayb ibn Sulaym al-Karminī "transmitted extensively from Muḥammad ibn Ismāʿīl al-Bukhārī, transmitting from him Al-Mabsūṭ and other books that no one else transmitted." These unidentified works were authored in Bukhara between 253 and 256 AH.

=== Works of uncertain attribution ===
- Al-Jāmiʿ al-Kabīr (The Large Comprehensive Collection).

Mentioned by Ibn Ṭāhir without describing its contents. Possibly one of the unique works transmitted solely by Muhayb ibn Sulaym.

- Al-Sunan fī al-Fiqh (The Sunan in Jurisprudence).

Mentioned by Ibn al-Nadīm in Al-Fihrist. Likely an alternative title for one of Al-Bukhari's known legal works, or one of the texts transmitted by Muhayb ibn Sulaym.

- Al-Musnad al-Kabīr (The Large Musnad).

Mentioned by al-Firabrī. Highly likely to be the same work as Al-Mabsūṭ.

- Mashyakhat al-Bukhārī (Al-Bukhārī's Catalogue of Teachers).

Mentioned by al-Dhahabī. It is likely the treatise on the creed of his teachers transmitted by Ghunjār.

== School of law ==
In terms of law, scholars like Jonathan Brown assert that al-Bukhari was of the Ahl al-Hadith, an adherent of Ahmad ibn Hanbal's traditionalist school in law (fiqh), but fell victim to its most radical wing due to misunderstandings. This claim is supported by Hanbalis, although members of the Shafi'i and Ẓāhirī schools levy this claim as well. Scott Lucas argues that al-Bukhari's legal positions were similar to those of the Ẓāhirīs and Hanbalis of his time, suggesting al-Bukhari rejected qiyas and other forms of ra'y completely. Many are of the opinion that Al-Bukhari was a mujtahid with his own madhhab. Munir Ahmad asserts that historically most jurists considered him to be a muhaddith (scholar of hadith) and not a faqīh (jurist), and that as a muhaddith, he followed the Shafi'i school. The Harvard historian Ahmed el-Shamsy also asserts this, as he states that he was a student of the Shafi'i scholar al-Karabisi (d. 245/859).

A significant number of scholars, both historical and contemporary, maintain that al-Bukhari was an independent mujtahid and did not adhere to any of the four famous madhhabs. Al-Dhahabi said that: Imam Bukhari was a mujtahid, a scholar capable of making his own ijtihad without following any Islamic school of jurisprudence in particular.

== Theology ==
According to some scholars, such as Christopher Melchert, and also Ash'ari theologians, including Ibn Hajar al-'Asqalani and al-Bayhaqi, al-Bukhari was a follower of the Kullabi school of Sunni theology due to his position on the utterance of the Quran being created. Other Kullabis, such as al-Harith al-Muhasibi, were harassed and made to relocate, a similar situation al-Bukhari found himself towards the latter years of his life by other Hanbalis. He was also known to be a student of al-Karabisi (d. 245/859), who was a direct student of Imam al-Shafi'i from his period in Iraq. Al-Karabisi was also known to have associated himself directly with Ibn Kullab and the Kullabi school of thought.

=== Interpretation of God's attributes ===
According to Namira Nahouza in her work 'Wahhabism and the Rise of the New Salafists', al-Bukhari in his Sahih, in the book entitled "Tafsir al-Qur'an wa 'ibaratih" [i.e., Exegesis of the Qur'an and its expressions], surat al-Qasas, verse 88: "kullu shay'in halikun illa Wajhah" [the literal meaning of which is "everything will perish except His Face"], he said the term [illa Wajhah] means: "except His Sovereignty/Dominance". And there is [in this same chapter] other than that in terms of ta'wil (metaphorical interpretation), like the term 'dahk' (Arabic: ضحك, lit. 'laughter') which is narrated in a hadith, [which is interpreted by] His Mercy.

=== Views on predestination ===
Al-Bukhari also rebuked those who rejected of qadar (predestination) in Sahih al-Bukhari by quoting a verse of the Qur'an implying that God had precisely determined all human acts. According to Ibn Hajar al-'Asqalani, al-Bukhari signified that if someone was to accept autonomy in creating his acts, he would be assumed to be playing God's role and so would subsequently be declared a Mushrik, similar to the later Ash'ari view of kasb (acquisition, occasionalism, and causality, which link human action with divine omnipotence). In another chapter, al-Bukhari refutes the creeds of the Kharijites. According to Badr al-Din al-'Ayni, the heading of that chapter was designed not only to refute the Kharijites but any who held similar beliefs.

== See also ==
- Sahih al-Bukhari
- Al-Tarikh al-Kabir
- Al-Adab al-Mufrad

== Notes and references ==
=== Sources ===
- Bukhari, Imam (194-256H) الإمام البُخاري; An educational Encyclopedia of Islam; Syed Iqbal Zaheer
- Abdul Qadir Muhammad Jalal et al., "Elevating Imam Al Bukhari: Affirming the Status of Imam Al Bukhari and His Sahih by Dispelling the Misconceptions Surrounding them", Lagos 2021

Early Islamic scholars

Muhammad, The final Messenger of God (570–632) the Constitution of Medina, taught the Quran, and advised his companions
Abdullah ibn Masud (died 653) taught	Ali (607–661) fourth caliph taught	Aisha, Muhammad's wife and Abu Bakr's daughter taught	Abd Allah ibn Abbas (618–687) taught	Zayd ibn Thabit (610–660) taught	Umar (579–644) second caliph taught	Abu Hurairah (603–681) taught
Alqama ibn Qays (died 681) taught	Husayn ibn Ali (626–680) taught	Qasim ibn Muhammad ibn Abi Bakr (657–725) taught and raised by Aisha	Urwah ibn Zubayr (died 713) taught by Aisha, he then taught	Said ibn al-Musayyib (637–715) taught	Abdullah ibn Umar (614–693) taught	Abd Allah ibn al-Zubayr (624–692) taught by Aisha, he then taught
Ibrahim al-Nakha’i taught	Ali ibn Husayn Zayn al-Abidin (659–712) taught	Hisham ibn Urwah (667–772) taught	Ibn Shihab al-Zuhri (died 741) taught	Salim ibn Abd-Allah ibn Umar taught	Umar ibn Abdul Aziz (682–720) raised and taught by Abdullah ibn Umar
Hammad ibn Abi Sulayman taught	Muhammad al-Baqir (676–733) taught	Farwah bint al-Qasim Jafar's mother
Abu Hanifa (699–767) wrote Al Fiqh Al Akbar and Kitab Al-Athar, jurisprudence followed by Sunni, Sunni Sufi, Barelvi, Deobandi, Zaidiyyah and originally by the Fatimid and taught	Zayd ibn Ali (695–740)	Ja'far bin Muhammad Al-Baqir (702–765) Muhammad and Ali's great great grand son, jurisprudence followed by Shia, he taught	Malik ibn Anas (711–795) wrote Muwatta, jurisprudence from early Medina period now mostly followed by Maliki Sunnis in North Africa, and taught	Al-Waqidi (748–822) wrote history books like Kitab al-Tarikh wa al-Maghazi, student of Malik ibn Anas	Abu Muhammad Abdullah ibn Abdul Hakam (died 829) wrote biographies and history books, student of Malik ibn Anas
Abu Yusuf (729–798) wrote Usul al-fiqh	Muhammad al-Shaybani (749–805)	al-Shafi‘i (767–820) wrote Al-Risala, jurisprudence followed by Shafi'i Sunnis and Sufis, and taught	Ismail ibn Ibrahim	Ali ibn al-Madini (778–849) wrote The Book of Knowledge of the Companions	Ibn Hisham (died 833) wrote early history and As-Sirah an-Nabawiyyah, Muhammad's biography
Isma'il ibn Ja'far (719–775)	Musa al-Kadhim (745–799)	Ahmad ibn Hanbal (780–855) wrote Musnad Ahmad ibn Hanbal jurisprudence followed by Hanbali Sunnis and Sufis	Muhammad al-Bukhari (810–870) wrote Sahih al-Bukhari hadith books	Muslim ibn al-Hajjaj (815–875) wrote Sahih Muslim hadith books	Dawud al-Zahiri (815–883/4) founded the Zahiri school	Muhammad ibn Isa at-Tirmidhi (824–892) wrote Jami` at-Tirmidhi hadith books	Al-Baladhuri (died 892) wrote early history Futuh al-Buldan, Genealogies of the Nobles
Ibn Majah (824–887) wrote Sunan ibn Majah hadith book	Abu Dawood (817–889) wrote Sunan Abu Dawood Hadith Book
Muhammad ibn Ya'qub al-Kulayni (864- 941) wrote Kitab al-Kafi hadith book followed by Twelver Shia	Muhammad ibn Jarir al-Tabari (838–923) wrote History of the Prophets and Kings, Tafsir al-Tabari	Abu al-Hasan al-Ash'ari (874–936) wrote Maqālāt al-islāmīyīn, Kitāb al-luma, Kitāb al-ibāna 'an usūl al-diyāna
Ibn Babawayh (923–991) wrote Man La Yahduruhu al-Faqih jurisprudence followed by Twelver Shia	Sharif Razi (930–977) wrote Nahj al-Balagha followed by Twelver Shia	Nasir al-Din al-Tusi (1201–1274) wrote jurisprudence books followed by Ismaili and Twelver Shia	Al-Ghazali (1058–1111) wrote The Niche for Lights, The Incoherence of the Philosophers, The Alchemy of Happiness on Sufism	Rumi (1207–1273) wrote Masnavi, Diwan-e Shams-e Tabrizi on Sufism
Key: Some of Muhammad's Companions	Key: Taught in Medina	Key: Taught in Iraq	Key: Worked in Syria	Key: Travelled extensively collecting the sayings of Muhammad and compiled books of hadith	Key: Worked in Persia
