= Ibn Kullab =

9th-century Arab Muslim scholar

Ibn Kullāb ابن كُلاَّب

Personal life
- Born: Unknown
- Died: 240 A.H. = 854 A.D. 241 A.H. = 855 A.D.
- Era: Islamic Golden Age
- Region: Abbasid Caliphate
- Main interest(s): Aqidah, Kalam (Islamic theology)
- Notable work: Al-Radd 'ala al-Hashwiyya

Religious life
- Religion: Islam
- Denomination: Sunni
- Jurisprudence: Shafi'i
- Creed: Ahl al-Hadith

Muslim leader
- Influenced by: Al-Salaf al-Salih (the pious scholars of early Islam)
- Influenced: Dawud al-Zahiri Harith al-Muhasibi Junayd of Baghdad Muhammad al-Bukhari Abu al-Hasan al-Ash'ari Ibn Hibban Abu al-Abbas al-Qalanisi Al Karibisi
- Arabic name
- Personal (Ism): ʿAbd Allāh عبد الله
- Patronymic (Nasab): ibn Saʿīd ibn Muḥammad ibn Kullāb al-Qaṭṭān بن سعيد بن محمد بن كُلَّاب القطان
- Teknonymic (Kunya): Abū Muḥammad أبو محمد
- Toponymic (Nisba): al-Tamīmī al-Baṣrī التميمي البصري

Ibn Kullāb (Arabic: ابن كُلاَّب; d. ca. 241/855) was an early Sunni theologian (mutakallim) in Basra and Baghdad in the first half of the 9th century during the time of the Mihna and belonged, according to Ibn al-Nadim, to the traditionalist group of the Nawabit. (Note: According to Benjamin Jokisch, those who converted to Islam became known as Nawabit (Neophytes) and formed the fundament of the traditionalist opposition in Baghdad. However it was also used by scholars such as al-Jahiz as a term for a group he and other Mu'tazilites grew increasingly worried at for they were seen as more intellectually able than them and had advanced in Kalam. Al-Jahiz confesses that they have been building up a type of solidarity against the Mu'tazila and have become aggressive against them, claiming to have on their side, "the masses, the recluses, the jurists, the hadith people and the ascetics". Wadad al-Qadi notes that all of those who wrote on them, aside from one, were Mu'tazilites or Mu'tazilite sympathisers and that he finds it curious that none of the Muslim heresiographers mention them as a sect, aside from Ibn al-Nadim, who Wadad would hesitate to call a heresiographer. Wadad concludes, "Indeed, under different names, they are still with us today.") His movement, also called Kullabiyya, (Note: The Kullabiyya, a moderate traditionalist movement, which was intended to revive the early Sunni Islam and later on turned into the Ash'ariyya.) merged and developed into Ash'arism, which, along with Maturidism and Atharism (practically: Hanbalism), (Note: In contrast, J. Halverson notes: 'Conversely, when we look at Hanbalism too, we can see quite clearly that it is incorrect to consider Hanbalism and “Atharism” to be synonymous. The works of Hanbalite scholars such as Ibn 'Aqil (d. 1119 CE), Ibn al-Jawzi (d. 1201 CE), and Najm al-Din al-Tufi (d. 1316 CE), among a few others, reveal instances of distinctly theological ideas occurring within Hanbalism, making it a far more diverse tradition than one may otherwise suspect. However, the overwhelming majority of Hanbalites did indeed fall firmly within the Athari camp with its unyielding rejection of theology. . . The Atharis can thus be described as a school or movement led by a contingent of scholars (ulama), typically Hanbalite or even Shafi'ite, that retained influence, or at the very least a shared sentiment and conception of piety, well beyond the limited range of Hanbalite communities. This body of scholars continued to reject theology in favour of strict textualism well after Ash'arism had infiltrated the Sunni schools of law. It is for these reasons that we must delineate the existence of a distinctly traditionalist, anti-theological movement, which defies strict identification with any particular madhhab, and therefore cannot be described as Hanbalite.') forms the theological basis of Sunni Islam.

Ibn Kullab headed a group made up of mainly direct and second generation students of Al-Shafi that included Al-Karibisi, Al-Qalanisi, Al-Muhasibi, Al-Bukhari, Abu Thawr and Dawud-al Zahiri. They were known for their extreme criticism of Jahmis, Mu'tazilis, and Anthropomorphists by using rationalistic methods (Kalam) to defend orthodox creedal points of Sunni Islam. They contradicted the Mu'tazili doctrine of Khalq al-Qur'an (Createdness of the Qur'an) by introducing a distinction between the words of God (Kalam Allah) and its pronunciation.

He was praised by several famous scholars, including Ibn 'Asakir, Taj al-Din al-Subki, Ibn Hajar al-'Asqalani, Ibn Khaldun, Ibn Abi Zayd al-Qayrawani, Ibn Qadi Shuhba, Jamal al-Din al-Isnawi, Kamal al-Din al-Bayadi in his Isharat al-Maram, Abu Mansur al-Baghdadi in his work Kitab Usul al-Din, al-Shahrastani in al-Milal wa al-Nihal, and al-Kawthari.

== Name ==
His full name has been given as Abū Muḥammad ʿAbd Allāh ibn Sāʿīd ibn Muḥammad ibn Kullāb al-Qaṭṭān al-Tamīmī al-Baṣrī. Muslim biographers differed on both the meaning of and reading of his name. They differed between Kullāb and Kilāb with the majority reading it as Kullāb and interpreting the meaning to also be indicative of a theological programme. The Arabic word kullāb means "hook" so the name Ibn Kullāb was interpreted to indicate his attempt at winning over theological opponents. The sobriquet al-Qattān suggests he was a cotton merchant, however, it is possibly a family name and he was potentially related to the Basran traditionalist Yaḥyā ibn Saʿīd al-Qaṭṭān al-Tamīmī.

== Life ==
Nothing is known about his life. He belonged to the generation of Ahmad ibn Hanbal and Ishaq ibn Rahwayh. His precise year of birth is unknown, but he lived in the period of the 'Abbasid caliph al-Ma'mun.

== Students ==
It has been said that Dawud al-Zahiri, al-Bukhari and al-Harith al-Muhasibi learned kalam from him, according to al-Dhahabi in his Siyar A'lam Al-Nubala'. It has been reported also that al-Junayd al-Baghdadi was one of his students.

== Death ==
He died in 240 AH, or according to some in 241 AH. b

== Books ==
He has a number of works that are documented such as:

- Kitab al-Radd 'ala al-Hashwiyya (meaning the 'crammers,' a term also used for the deviant misguided Anthropomorphists).
- Kitab al-Radd 'ala al-Mu'tazila.
- Kitab al-Sifat (Book of Divine Attributes).
- Kitab in al-Tawhid (Book of Islamic Monotheism).
- Kitab Khalq al-Af'al (Book of the Creation of Human Acts).

These books are lost, however remnants of them can be found in other works such as Maqalat al-Islamiyyin of Abu al-Hasan al-Ash'ari. He was also quoted by the early Ash'ari scholars such as Ibn Furak (d. 406H).

== See also ==
- Ahmad ibn Hanbal
- Muhammad ibn Jarir al-Tabari

== Notes ==
Early Islamic scholars

Muhammad, The final Messenger of God (570–632) the Constitution of Medina, taught the Quran, and advised his companions
Abdullah ibn Masud (died 653) taught	Ali (607–661) fourth caliph taught	Aisha, Muhammad's wife and Abu Bakr's daughter taught	Abd Allah ibn Abbas (618–687) taught	Zayd ibn Thabit (610–660) taught	Umar (579–644) second caliph taught	Abu Hurairah (603–681) taught
Alqama ibn Qays (died 681) taught	Husayn ibn Ali (626–680) taught	Qasim ibn Muhammad ibn Abi Bakr (657–725) taught and raised by Aisha	Urwah ibn Zubayr (died 713) taught by Aisha, he then taught	Said ibn al-Musayyib (637–715) taught	Abdullah ibn Umar (614–693) taught	Abd Allah ibn al-Zubayr (624–692) taught by Aisha, he then taught
Ibrahim al-Nakha’i taught	Ali ibn Husayn Zayn al-Abidin (659–712) taught	Hisham ibn Urwah (667–772) taught	Ibn Shihab al-Zuhri (died 741) taught	Salim ibn Abd-Allah ibn Umar taught	Umar ibn Abdul Aziz (682–720) raised and taught by Abdullah ibn Umar
Hammad ibn Abi Sulayman taught	Muhammad al-Baqir (676–733) taught	Farwah bint al-Qasim Jafar's mother
Abu Hanifa (699–767) wrote Al Fiqh Al Akbar and Kitab Al-Athar, jurisprudence followed by Sunni, Sunni Sufi, Barelvi, Deobandi, Zaidiyyah and originally by the Fatimid and taught	Zayd ibn Ali (695–740)	Ja'far bin Muhammad Al-Baqir (702–765) Muhammad and Ali's great great grand son, jurisprudence followed by Shia, he taught	Malik ibn Anas (711–795) wrote Muwatta, jurisprudence from early Medina period now mostly followed by Maliki Sunnis in North Africa, and taught	Al-Waqidi (748–822) wrote history books like Kitab al-Tarikh wa al-Maghazi, student of Malik ibn Anas	Abu Muhammad Abdullah ibn Abdul Hakam (died 829) wrote biographies and history books, student of Malik ibn Anas
Abu Yusuf (729–798) wrote Usul al-fiqh	Muhammad al-Shaybani (749–805)	al-Shafi‘i (767–820) wrote Al-Risala, jurisprudence followed by Shafi'i Sunnis and Sufis, and taught	Ismail ibn Ibrahim	Ali ibn al-Madini (778–849) wrote The Book of Knowledge of the Companions	Ibn Hisham (died 833) wrote early history and As-Sirah an-Nabawiyyah, Muhammad's biography
Isma'il ibn Ja'far (719–775)	Musa al-Kadhim (745–799)	Ahmad ibn Hanbal (780–855) wrote Musnad Ahmad ibn Hanbal jurisprudence followed by Hanbali Sunnis and Sufis	Muhammad al-Bukhari (810–870) wrote Sahih al-Bukhari hadith books	Muslim ibn al-Hajjaj (815–875) wrote Sahih Muslim hadith books	Dawud al-Zahiri (815–883/4) founded the Zahiri school	Muhammad ibn Isa at-Tirmidhi (824–892) wrote Jami` at-Tirmidhi hadith books	Al-Baladhuri (died 892) wrote early history Futuh al-Buldan, Genealogies of the Nobles
Ibn Majah (824–887) wrote Sunan ibn Majah hadith book	Abu Dawood (817–889) wrote Sunan Abu Dawood Hadith Book
Muhammad ibn Ya'qub al-Kulayni (864- 941) wrote Kitab al-Kafi hadith book followed by Twelver Shia	Muhammad ibn Jarir al-Tabari (838–923) wrote History of the Prophets and Kings, Tafsir al-Tabari	Abu al-Hasan al-Ash'ari (874–936) wrote Maqālāt al-islāmīyīn, Kitāb al-luma, Kitāb al-ibāna 'an usūl al-diyāna
Ibn Babawayh (923–991) wrote Man La Yahduruhu al-Faqih jurisprudence followed by Twelver Shia	Sharif Razi (930–977) wrote Nahj al-Balagha followed by Twelver Shia	Nasir al-Din al-Tusi (1201–1274) wrote jurisprudence books followed by Ismaili and Twelver Shia	Al-Ghazali (1058–1111) wrote The Niche for Lights, The Incoherence of the Philosophers, The Alchemy of Happiness on Sufism	Rumi (1207–1273) wrote Masnavi, Diwan-e Shams-e Tabrizi on Sufism
Key: Some of Muhammad's Companions	Key: Taught in Medina	Key: Taught in Iraq	Key: Worked in Syria	Key: Travelled extensively collecting the sayings of Muhammad and compiled books of hadith	Key: Worked in Persia
