= Dawud al-Zahiri =

Muslim scholar, jurist, and theologian (815–883)

Imam Dawud al-Zahiri
- دَاوُد الظَّاهِرِيُّ
- Title: Imām ahl al-Ẓāhir

Personal life
- Born: c. 815 Kufa, Abbasid Caliphate
- Died: c. 883–884 (age approx. 68) Baghdad, Abbasid Caliphate
- Home town: Kashan, Isfahan
- Era: Islamic Golden Age (Abbasid era)
- Region: Mesopotamia
- Main interest: Fiqh

Religious life
- Religion: Islam
- Denomination: Sunnī
- Jurisprudence: Independent (eponym of the Ẓāhirī school)
- Creed: Ẓāhirī-Atharī

Muslim leader
- Influenced by: Al-Shafi'i, Ahmad ibn Hanbal, Ibn Kullab, Ishaq Ibn Rahwayh, Abu Thawr, Yahya ibn Ma'in
- Influenced: Niftawayh, Muhammad bin Dawud al-Zahiri, al-Tabari, Ruwaym, Abd Allah al-Qaysi, Ibn Hazm, Ibn Tumart

Dāwūd ibn ʿAlī ibn Khalaf al-Ẓāhirī (Arabic: دَاوُدُ بنُ عَلِيِّ بنِ خَلَفٍ الظَّاهِرِيُّ; 815–883 CE / 199–269 AH) was Sunni Muslim scholar, jurist, and theologian during the Islamic Golden Age, specialized in the study of Islamic law (sharīʿa) and the fields of hermeneutics, biographical evaluation, and historiography of early Islam. He was the eponymous founder of the Ẓāhirī school of thought (madhhab), the fifth school of thought in Sunnī Islam, characterized by its strict adherence to literalism and reliance on the outward (ẓāhir) meaning of expressions in the Qur'an and ḥadīth literature; the consensus (ijmāʿ) of the first generation of companions of the Prophet (ṣaḥāba), for sources of Islamic law (sharīʿa); and rejection of analogical deduction (qiyās) and societal custom or knowledge (urf), used by other schools of Islamic jurisprudence. He was a celebrated, if not controversial, figure during his time, being referred to in Islamic historiographical texts as "the scholar of the era."

== Biography ==
=== Early life and family ===
Dāwūd al-Ẓāhirī's exact place of birth is not entirely clear to Muslim historians. It is disputed if he was from Kufa or Isfahan. He himself has been described as a Persian. Some attribute his origin to the Iranian city of Isfahan, and he has also been referred to as "Dāwūd al-Aṣbahānī". The Muslim historians and scholars Ibn Ḥazm and al-Dhahabī, as well as the modern American scholar of Islamic studies Christopher Melchert and others, however, held that this attribution was due to the fact that al-Ẓāhirī's mother was a native of Isfahan, and that he was actually from Iraq, having been born in the city of Kufa. The Hungarian scholar of Islamic studies Ignác Goldziher agreed that al-Ẓāhirī was born in Kufa, but attributed the confusion regarding his place of birth due to his father's role in the civil service of the Abbasid caliph al-Maʿmūn in Kashan, a smaller city near Isfahan.

=== Education ===
Early Islamic scholars

Muhammad, The final Messenger of God (570–632) the Constitution of Medina, taught the Quran, and advised his companions
Abdullah ibn Masud (died 653) taught	Ali (607–661) fourth caliph taught	Aisha, Muhammad's wife and Abu Bakr's daughter taught	Abd Allah ibn Abbas (618–687) taught	Zayd ibn Thabit (610–660) taught	Umar (579–644) second caliph taught	Abu Hurairah (603–681) taught
Alqama ibn Qays (died 681) taught	Husayn ibn Ali (626–680) taught	Qasim ibn Muhammad ibn Abi Bakr (657–725) taught and raised by Aisha	Urwah ibn Zubayr (died 713) taught by Aisha, he then taught	Said ibn al-Musayyib (637–715) taught	Abdullah ibn Umar (614–693) taught	Abd Allah ibn al-Zubayr (624–692) taught by Aisha, he then taught
Ibrahim al-Nakha’i taught	Ali ibn Husayn Zayn al-Abidin (659–712) taught	Hisham ibn Urwah (667–772) taught	Ibn Shihab al-Zuhri (died 741) taught	Salim ibn Abd-Allah ibn Umar taught	Umar ibn Abdul Aziz (682–720) raised and taught by Abdullah ibn Umar
Hammad ibn Abi Sulayman taught	Muhammad al-Baqir (676–733) taught	Farwah bint al-Qasim Jafar's mother
Abu Hanifa (699–767) wrote Al Fiqh Al Akbar and Kitab Al-Athar, jurisprudence followed by Sunni, Sunni Sufi, Barelvi, Deobandi, Zaidiyyah and originally by the Fatimid and taught	Zayd ibn Ali (695–740)	Ja'far bin Muhammad Al-Baqir (702–765) Muhammad and Ali's great great grand son, jurisprudence followed by Shia, he taught	Malik ibn Anas (711–795) wrote Muwatta, jurisprudence from early Medina period now mostly followed by Maliki Sunnis in North Africa, and taught	Al-Waqidi (748–822) wrote history books like Kitab al-Tarikh wa al-Maghazi, student of Malik ibn Anas	Abu Muhammad Abdullah ibn Abdul Hakam (died 829) wrote biographies and history books, student of Malik ibn Anas
Abu Yusuf (729–798) wrote Usul al-fiqh	Muhammad al-Shaybani (749–805)	al-Shafi‘i (767–820) wrote Al-Risala, jurisprudence followed by Shafi'i Sunnis and Sufis, and taught	Ismail ibn Ibrahim	Ali ibn al-Madini (778–849) wrote The Book of Knowledge of the Companions	Ibn Hisham (died 833) wrote early history and As-Sirah an-Nabawiyyah, Muhammad's biography
Isma'il ibn Ja'far (719–775)	Musa al-Kadhim (745–799)	Ahmad ibn Hanbal (780–855) wrote Musnad Ahmad ibn Hanbal jurisprudence followed by Hanbali Sunnis and Sufis	Muhammad al-Bukhari (810–870) wrote Sahih al-Bukhari hadith books	Muslim ibn al-Hajjaj (815–875) wrote Sahih Muslim hadith books	Dawud al-Zahiri (815–883/4) founded the Zahiri school	Muhammad ibn Isa at-Tirmidhi (824–892) wrote Jami` at-Tirmidhi hadith books	Al-Baladhuri (died 892) wrote early history Futuh al-Buldan, Genealogies of the Nobles
Ibn Majah (824–887) wrote Sunan ibn Majah hadith book	Abu Dawood (817–889) wrote Sunan Abu Dawood Hadith Book
Muhammad ibn Ya'qub al-Kulayni (864- 941) wrote Kitab al-Kafi hadith book followed by Twelver Shia	Muhammad ibn Jarir al-Tabari (838–923) wrote History of the Prophets and Kings, Tafsir al-Tabari	Abu al-Hasan al-Ash'ari (874–936) wrote Maqālāt al-islāmīyīn, Kitāb al-luma, Kitāb al-ibāna 'an usūl al-diyāna
Ibn Babawayh (923–991) wrote Man La Yahduruhu al-Faqih jurisprudence followed by Twelver Shia	Sharif Razi (930–977) wrote Nahj al-Balagha followed by Twelver Shia	Nasir al-Din al-Tusi (1201–1274) wrote jurisprudence books followed by Ismaili and Twelver Shia	Al-Ghazali (1058–1111) wrote The Niche for Lights, The Incoherence of the Philosophers, The Alchemy of Happiness on Sufism	Rumi (1207–1273) wrote Masnavi, Diwan-e Shams-e Tabrizi on Sufism
Key: Some of Muhammad's Companions	Key: Taught in Medina	Key: Taught in Iraq	Key: Worked in Syria	Key: Travelled extensively collecting the sayings of Muhammad and compiled books of hadith	Key: Worked in Persia

During his formative years, al-Ẓāhirī relocated from Kufa to Baghdad and studied the prophetic traditions (ḥadīth) and Quranic exegesis (tafsīr) with a number of notable Muslim scholars of the time, including Abū Thawr, Yaḥyā ibn Maʻīn, and Aḥmad ibn Ḥanbal. His study under renowned figures of traditionalist theology (Atharī) was in contrast to the views of his father, who was a follower of the less orthodox Ḥanafī school. Indian Muslim reformist Chiragh Ali has suggested that Ẓāhirī's school was, like that of Ibn Ḥanbal, actually a direct reaction to the Ḥanafī system of jurisprudence.

Toward the end of his education, al-Ẓāhirī traveled to Nishapur in Khorasan in order to complete his studies with Isḥāq ibn Rāhwayh, at the time considered a champion of the traditionalist Sunnī philosophy. Ibn al-Jawzī noted that when studying with Ibn Rāhwayh, considered one of the most knowledgeable scholars in the history of Islam, al-Ẓāhirī was willing to debate with Ibn Rāhwayh on religious topics, something no one else had ever dared to do. Ibn Rāhwayh criticized Muḥammad ibn Idrīs al-Shāfiʿī, founder of the Shāfiʿī school, during one of his lessons; a debate ensued in which al-Ẓāhirī alleged that Ibn Rāhwayh didn't understand al-Shāfiʿī 's point on the topic of discussion, although Aḥmad ibn Ḥanbal, who was physically present for the debate, declared Ibn Rāhwayh to be the winner.

Al-Ẓāhirī was initially a follower of al-Shāfiʿī in matters of jurisprudence, later branching off in terms of his principles, likely due to the influence of Ibn Rāhwayh. Describing him as "fanatical" both in his adherence to al-Shāfiʿī and to his own school later on, the Encyclopaedia of Islam describes the Ẓāhirīte school as a one-sided elaboration of Shāfiʿī te doctrine, taking the latter's rejection of juristic discretion as a principle in formulating law and applying it to all forms of human reasoning.

=== Teaching ===
After completing his studies in Nishapur, al-Ẓāhirī returned to Baghdad and began delivering his own lessons. While historians differ regarding his exact number of students, it is agreed that his following was large, with most estimates ranging between four and five hundred students who would regularly attend his majlis. His reputation spread outside of Baghdad, and even high-level scholars from elsewhere in the Muslim world began seeking al-Ẓāhirī's advice on religious topics of study. While his views were not universally accepted in his time, no attempts were made by his contemporaries to prevent him from granting religious verdicts, nor were they opposed to his teaching position. His most well-known students were his son Abū Bakr Muḥammad ibn Dāwūd al-Iṣfahānī; ʿAbdullah, the son of Aḥmad ibn Ḥanbal; and al-Ṭabarī, Nifṭawayh, and Ruwaym. Al-Ẓāhirī was also the teacher of the Sunnī Muslim jurist ʿAbd Allāh al-Qaysī, who was responsible for spreading the Ẓāhirīte school in al-Andalus.

=== Death ===
Al-Ẓāhirī died during the month of Ramaḍān in Baghdad, where he was buried. The exact year in which he died according to the Gregorian calendar is a matter of some dispute, with historians having stated both 883 CE and 884 CE.

== Views ==
=== Creed ===
Al-Dhahabī states that al-Ẓāhirī learnt kalām (dialectical theology) from Ibn Kullāb. Similarly to other Muslim scholars who were accused of sharing Ibn Kullāb's creed (ʿaqīdah), such as Ḥārit̲h̲ al-Muḥāsibī and Muḥammad al-Bukhārī, al-Ẓāhirī was repudiated by certain factions of ḥadīth authorities of his era, which accused him of holding particular creedal views relating to God's speech.

Al-Ẓāhirī's understanding of the Islamic faith was described by al-Dhahabī's teacher, the Syrian Muslim historian and scholar Ibn Taymiyyah, as having been based upon the Atharī ‘aqīdah, affirming the attributes of God without delving into their fundamental nature. Muḥammad ibn ʿAbd al-Karīm al-Shahrastānī, a 12th-century Persian Muslim historian of religion and Ashʿarī theologian, classified al-Ẓāhirī along with Mālik ibn Anas (founder of the Mālikī school), Aḥmad ibn Ḥanbal, and Sufyān al-Thawrī as early Sunnī Muslim scholars who rejected both esoteric and anthropotheistic interpretations of God, but both Ibn Taymiyyah and al-Shahrastānī considered al-Ẓāhirī and his students, along with Mālik ibn Anas, al-Shāfiʿī, Ibn Ḥanbal, al-Thawrī, Abū Thawr, al-Māwardī, and their students to be the Ahl al-Ḥadīth ("people of the tradition"), as opposed to the Ahl al-Ra'y ("people of logic").

=== Analogical reasoning ===
This creed of not delving into the fundamental nature of the texts likely affected al-Ẓāhirī's views on literalism as well. While all the major figures of Islam were united upon the Qur'an and sunnah being the foremost sources of Islamic law (sharīʿa), al-Ẓāhirī held that these two sources must also be taken at the literal meanings and only applied in the particular circumstances which they described.

Al-Ẓāhirī rejected the principle of qiyās, otherwise known as "analogical reasoning", as a method of deducing rulings in Islamic jurisprudence, regarding it as a form of bidʻah, which means "innovation" within the Islamic religion, which the Islamic prophet Muhammad had not allowed.

There are conflicting views regarding al-Ẓāhirī's position when the specific causality of a command or prohibition within the Quran or prophetic example was stated, due to different Muslim historians recording opposing statements. Some take the view that al-Ẓāhirī restricted the ruling to the incident or condition in which the causality arose, seeing that the causality provides a concrete law; others take the view that he would instead form a general principle in the event of a stated causality.

=== Consensus ===
Al-Ẓāhirī considered the scholarly consensus (ijmāʿ) to consist only of the opinions of the first generation of Muhammad's closest companions (ṣaḥāba), excluding all other generations after them from this definition.

=== Nature of the Quran ===
While al-Ẓāhirī at one time studied the ḥadīth literature under Aḥmad ibn Ḥanbal, he was later barred from study due to a dispute regarding the nature of the Qur'an; al-Ẓāhirī stated that the Qur'an was muhdath or "recently occurring", a stance of which Ibn Ḥanbal strongly disapproved. Even before that time, Ibn Ḥanbal had actually cut off contact with anyone who would study with or consult al-Ẓāhirī regarding religious matters, a habit which Ibn Ḥanbal started after witnessing Ẓāhirī's defense of al-Shāfiʿī against the attacks of Ibn Rāhwayh. The rumor regarding al-Ẓāhirī's statement about the Quran only added more fuel to the fire. The Syrian Muslim historian and scholar Ibn Taymiyyah said that the dispute was semantic in nature, arising from a confusion of al-Ẓāhirī's intended meaning—that God is unique and existent without peers (tawḥīd)—and the intended meaning of the Jahmite and Muʿtazilite schools—that the Qur'an was created (makhlūq).

Thus al-Ẓāhirī, Ibn Ḥanbal, al-Shāfiʿī, Mālik ibn Anas, al-Thawrī, Ibn Rāhwayh, al-Ṭabarī, Abū Ḥanīfa al-Nuʿmān, ʿAbd al-Raḥmān al-Awzāʿī, Ibn Khuzaymah, ʿAbdullah ibn Mubārak, al-Dārimī, and Muḥammad al-Bukhārī—described by Ibn Taymiyyah as the leading figures of Islam at the time—all agreed that the Quran was uncreated, but a semantic misunderstanding arose when al-Ẓāhirī, al-Bukhārī, Muslim bin al-Ḥajjāj, and others used the phrase "recently occurring" to establish that God and the Quran, believed by Muslims to be the literal speech of God, are not the same thing, but rather that God's speech is an attribute.

Modern-day scholarship has suggested, in light of the weakness in the chains of narration connecting the phrase "the Quran is recently occurring" to al-Ẓāhirī that he may have never made such a statement or held such a belief at all. Due to al-Ẓāhirī's denial of analogical reasoning and blind following—cornerstones in the other main Sunnī schools of thought—the students of those schools may have forged the statement and attributed it to al-Ẓāhirī as a means of pushing the common people away from him and his eponymous school of thought. Abū ʿUbaida further supported his point by noting that al-Ẓāhirī and his students were actually severer in their opposition to the Muʿtazilite school and their belief that the Quran was created than Ibn Ḥanbal was, using harsh language in their written responses to such beliefs.

=== Usury ===
Al-Ẓāhirī held the view that regarding in-kind exchanges of goods, the forbidden type of usury applies only to the six commodities specified by the Islamic prophet Muhammad: gold, silver, wheat, barley, dates, and salt. Because al-Ẓāhirī rejected the use of analogical reasoning in jurisprudence, he disagreed with the majority view that the prohibition on excess gain in in-kind exchanges of all commodities, and did not consider such gains to be a form of interest. Had Muhammad intended to include commodities other than the above six, he could have done so; because he specified that usury was only prohibited in these six commodities and that Muslims were free to deal in other commodities as they liked, al-Ẓāhirī saw no basis for making an analogy to any other commodities.

=== Female dress ===
According to Muḥammad ash-Shawkānī, al-Ẓāhirī regarded the Muslim face veil to be recommended (mustaḥabb) rather than obligatory (wajīb) or mandatory (fard), which was the majority opinion of most contemporary Hanafi and Hanbali scholars during his time. He considered that a woman's face could be uncovered in public, but that all other body parts must be covered.

=== Traveling ===
If a Muslim begins traveling while fasting (ṣawm) during the month of Ramaḍān, al-Ẓāhirī saw that the individual should break their fast on the day which they started their journey, a view upon which both Ibn Ḥanbal and Ibn Rāhwayh agreed. This was due to the Quranic verse allowing the traveler to skip the Ramaḍān fast and make it up when they complete their journey. If a Muslim did fast while traveling, they would still have to make up the days the skipped according to al-Ẓāhirī's view, as the verse wasn't merely an allowance for breaking the fast, but a command.

Most Muslims shorten the length of their prayers while traveling as well. This "traveling" by which the Muslim shortens his prayers and breaks the fast is a topic of discussion among jurists as to its distance and duration. Al-Ẓāhirī saw that any form of traveling, regardless of distance or duration, allowed the individual to shorten their prayers.

== Works ==
Al-Ẓāhirī was known as being a prolific author, and the Arab-Persian Muslim historian and bibliographer Ibn al-Nadīm was able to personally record the names of at least 157 of his written works, the majority on topics within Islamic studies. Some of these works were very long, and they covered both legal theory and all branches of positive law. He was also considered to be the first person to have written a biography of his former teacher, al-Shāfiʿī. Melchert cites Ibn al-Nadīm and Ibn ʿAbd al-Barr for his claim that Ẓāhirī's biography of al-Shāfiʿī was the not just the first biography about al-Shāfiʿī but the first major biography of any Muslim jurist ever written. None of these works have survived to the modern era in their entirety.

Ibn al-Nadīm also mentions that after al-Shāfiʿī's treatise al-Risala, Ibn Ḥanbal and al-Ẓāhirī were the next major Sunnī Muslim scholars to author works on the principles of Islamic jurisprudence (Uṣūl al-Fiqh), with al-Ẓāhirī producing a number of works on various topics, including his rejection of blindly following the Islamic clergymen, the difference between general and specific verses of the Quran, the difference between succinct and detailed commands in the Islamic religion, and his views on and experiences with his former teacher, al-Shāfiʿī. Modern scholarship has pieced together chapter headings for al-Ẓāhirī's work on juristic principles from other early works in the following order: binding consensus, invalidity of blindly following the clergy, invalidity of analogical reasoning, traditions transmitted by single authorities, traditions which provide certainty, incontrovertible proof, particular vs. general scriptural texts, and specified vs. unspecified texts. The chapters—and perhaps even the information contained therein—have primarily been preserved in the Fāṭimid-era works of the Ismāʿīlī Shīʿite jurist Qāḍī al-Nuʿmān, in addition to the passages preserved in the treatise al-Muhalla of the Sunnī Muslim historian Ibn Ḥazm, an adherent of the Ẓāhirīte school.

== Contemporary evaluation ==
Although al-Ẓāhirī's theological views were and are considered controversial, his character and religious piety carry universal acclaim. The Muslim scholars al-Khaṭīb al-Baghdādī, al-Dhahabī, al-Ṭabarī, al-Nawāwī, al-Suyūṭī, and al-Albānī all attested to his morality, humility, and personal ethics.

=== Sunnī views ===
While the Ẓāhirīte or "Dāwūdi" school, as they were known during the early history of Islam, is not as numerous today as the other four major Sunnī schools of thought, it was once a major school and encompassed Mesopotamia, the Iberian Peninsula, the Balearic Islands, North Africa, and Southern Iran. Even his contemporary critics conceded to his intellect and level of knowledge, even while rejecting his beliefs. He has been described as "the scholar of the era" by al-Dhahabī, and the hierarchy of religious knowledge in Baghdad was considered to have ended with al-Ẓāhirī at the top. When al-Ṭabarī was asked regarding the books of Ibn Qutaybah, he answered that Ibn Qutaybah's work was "nothing", and recommended the books of the "people of jurisprudence", mentioning al-Shāfiʿī and al-Ẓāhirī by name, then "their contemporaries".

Members of other schools have often criticized al-Ẓāhirī for his rejection of analogical reasoning. The early followers of al-Shāfiʿī in general held negative views of their former classmate, and the followers of the Shāfiʿīte school, al-Juwāynī in particular, were harsh upon al-Ẓāhirī himself. This is not universal, and many followers of the Shāfiʿī school have taken more accommodating views of al-Ẓāhirī's legal rulings. Al-Dhahabī defended al-Ẓāhirī and his followers, stating that just as al-Juwāynī had arrived to his views by the process of scholarly discourse, so had al-Ẓāhirī. Likewise, Ibn al-Ṣalāḥ also defended the legitimacy of al-Ẓāhirī's views and his school, listing a number of figures from the other Sunnī schools of thought who considered al-Ẓāhirī's opinions in scholarly discourse.

=== Shīʿa views ===
Shīʿa Muslims have taken a dimmer view of al-Ẓāhirī and his school. In the 1970s, Twelver Shīʿīte scholar Abdul Kareem Mushtaq accused al-Ẓāhirī of having held anthropotheistic beliefs regarding God, citing the Persian Sunnī historian and theologian al-Shahrastānī as his source. Nearly four decades later, the section of al-Shahrastānī's work was translated into English, demonstrating that al-Shahrastānī had actually stated that al-Ẓāhirī didn't hold anthropotheistic beliefs about God. al-Shahrastani had stated:

"As for Aĥmad ibn Ĥanbal, Dāwūd ibn 'Alī al-Işfahānī and a group of Imāms from the predecessors, they took the methodological course of the early predecessors from the people of narrations—such as Mālik ibn Anas and Muqātil ibn Sulaymān—and followed the safe path.

They said: 'We believe in whatever is mentioned in the Book and the Sunna, and we do not come to grips with the interpretation; after we certainly know that Allāh, the Powerful and Exalted, does not resemble anything from the creation and that all what is portrayed in imagination is created and foreordained.'

And they used to guard themselves from anthropomorphism to such a degree, that they said: 'Whosoever moved his hand during the recitation of His statement: '…I created with My hands?' or pointed with his two fingers during his narration: 'The heart of the believer is between two fingers of the Merciful,' his hand should be cut and his two fingers removed."

Ismāʿīlī Shīʿas have, perhaps, been more accurate in that for which they criticized al-Ẓāhirī. The Ismāʿīlī Shīʿīte jurist Qāḍī al-Nuʿmān was particularly critical of al-Ẓāhirī for rejecting analogical reasoning yet at the same time accepting inference as a valid means of logical deduction, a position for which he also criticized al-Zahiri's son and school in general.

=== Muʿtazilite views ===
Being steeped in esoteric philosophy, the Muʿtazila school were quite hostile towards al-Ẓāhirī and his school. Although some prominent figures of this school, such as the Muʿtazilite theologian Ibrāhīm al-Naẓẓām, denied the validity of analogical reasoning as al-Ẓāhirī did, they also denied literalism and the validity of consensus, and most of them found al-Ẓāhirī's ideas to be ridiculous.

== See also ==
- Ibn Kullab
- Ibn Hazm
- Ibn Tumart
