= Great History =

Great History may refer to:

- The Great History, a 9th-century Arabic book by Muhammad al-Bukhari
- Lushi (book), a 12th-century Chinese book by Luo Mi (Luo Bi)
