= Ibn Abi Asim =

9th century Iraqi Sunni scholar

Ibn Abi Asim ابن أبي عاصم
- Title: Imam, Qadi

Personal life
- Born: 206 AH (821/2 AD) Basra
- Died: 287 AH (900 AD) Isfahan
- Era: Islamic golden age
- Region: Iraq
- Main interest(s): Hadith, Fiqh
- Occupation: Muhaddith, Islamic Scholar, Muslim jurist

Religious life
- Religion: Islam
- Denomination: Sunni

Muslim leader
- Influenced by: Dawud al-Zahiri, Al-Bukhari, Abu Hatim Muhammad ibn Idris al-Razi
- Influenced: Muhammad Nasiruddin al-Albani, Muqbil bin Hadi al-Wadi'i

Abu Bakr Ahmad bin `Amr ad-Dahhak bin Makhlad ash-Shaibani (Arabic: أبو بكرأحمد بن عمرو بن الضحاك بن مخلد الشيباني), widely known as Ibn Abi Asim (Arabic: ابن أبي عاصم), was an Iraqi Sunni scholar of the 9th century. He is most famous for his work in the field of hadith science.

== Biography ==
=== Family and early life ===
Ibn Abi Asim was born in Basra, Iraq in 822. He grew up in an academic household, as both his father and his grandfather were scholars of Prophetic traditions in their own right. Due to his family's scholarly background, he was educated in the religious sciences at an early age. While religious learning was often begun in a madrasa or masjid starting in the early teens, Ibn Abi Asim had a head start relative to his time period.

=== Career ===
Eventually, Ibn Abi Asim left Basra for the city of Isfahan, further to the east. Late in life, he was granted a position as a judge at his new city of residence.

=== Death ===
Ibn Abi Asim died in Isfahan in the year 900. He was 81 years old and at the time of his death, he was still holding his position as a judge. According to Iranian historian Abu Nu`aym, Ibn Abi Asim was buried in Isfahan's Doshabaz cemetery.

== Legacy ==
=== Works ===
Ibn Abi Asim compiled numerous Prophetic traditions into two volumes, organized into chapters based on different theological and creed-related topics. He had also written about the first-generation Muslim and Umayyad caliph, Mu'awiya, though the work is now lost. Likewise, the exact topic has eluded historians, with Al-Suyuti claiming it was a book on Mu'awiya's dreams, while Ibn Hajar referred to it as a book on Mu'awiya's virtues. It is not known whether the topic Ibn Abi Asim's essay was actually disputed, or if he had simply written about both topics.

=== Sunni Muslim evaluation ===
Historians Abu al-Abbas al-Niswi and Abu Nu`aym both reported Ibn Abi Asim as having been a Zahiri. Although he has become an important figure for the Zahiri school in the modern day, few of his works in jurisprudence have survived to the modern era.

== See also ==
- Al-Dahhak ibn Makhlad
