= Al Rahbi Park =

Park in Baghdad, Iraq

- حديقة الرحبي
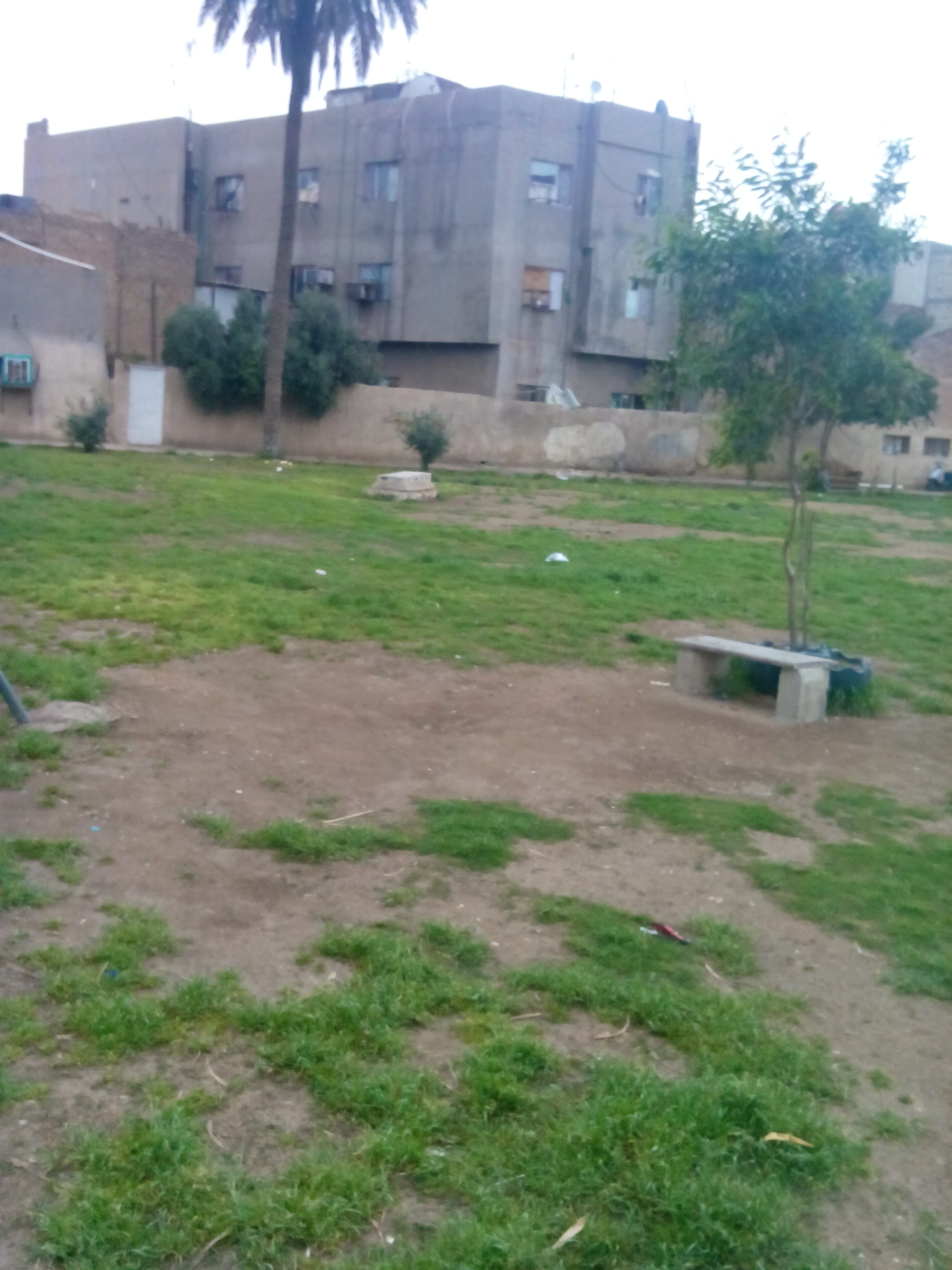
- The park in 2017

- Location within Iraq

General information
- Status: Active
- Location: Adhamiyah, Baghdad, Iraq
- Coordinates: 33.3746423°N 44.3631162°E

Design and construction
- Known for: Containing the tomb of the renowned Muslim scholar Muhammad ibn Jarir al-Tabari

Al Rahbi Park (Arabic: حديقة الرحبي) is a park located in the Adhamiyah district of Baghdad, Iraq. The park is known for containing the tomb of the famous Muslim scholar, Muhammad ibn Jarir al-Tabari (839–923 CE), the author of the Tarikh al-Tabari historical chronicle and the famed Tafsir al-Tabari exegesis of the Qur'an.

== Tomb of Al-Tabari ==
The tomb of the famous Muslim jurist and scholar, Al-Tabari, is located at a far corner of Al Rahbi Park. The tomb, which had been forgotten for years, was rediscovered in 2002 when several old houses were demolished to expand the area of the park. Archaeologists and historians including Imad Abd al-Salam Rauf subsequently identified the tomb as belonging to Al-Tabari, and the place was made into a heritage site.

In late 2017, locals reported that the tomb was in a state of neglect and filthy, with rubbish being dumped on it. Subsequent pictures showed the grave in a dilapidated and filthy condition, with litter strewn everywhere. Locals were unsatisfied with the condition of the tomb, and went online to voice the matter of the government's lack of interest in preserving the tomb.

In 2018, the Sunni Endowment Office announced that a new mausoleum structure, or shrine, would be built around the pre-existing grave of Al-Tabari, headed by Abdul Latif Hamim under the supervision of Saad Mahmoud Al Qaisi, the current Director General of the Department of Religious Shrines.

=== Gallery ===
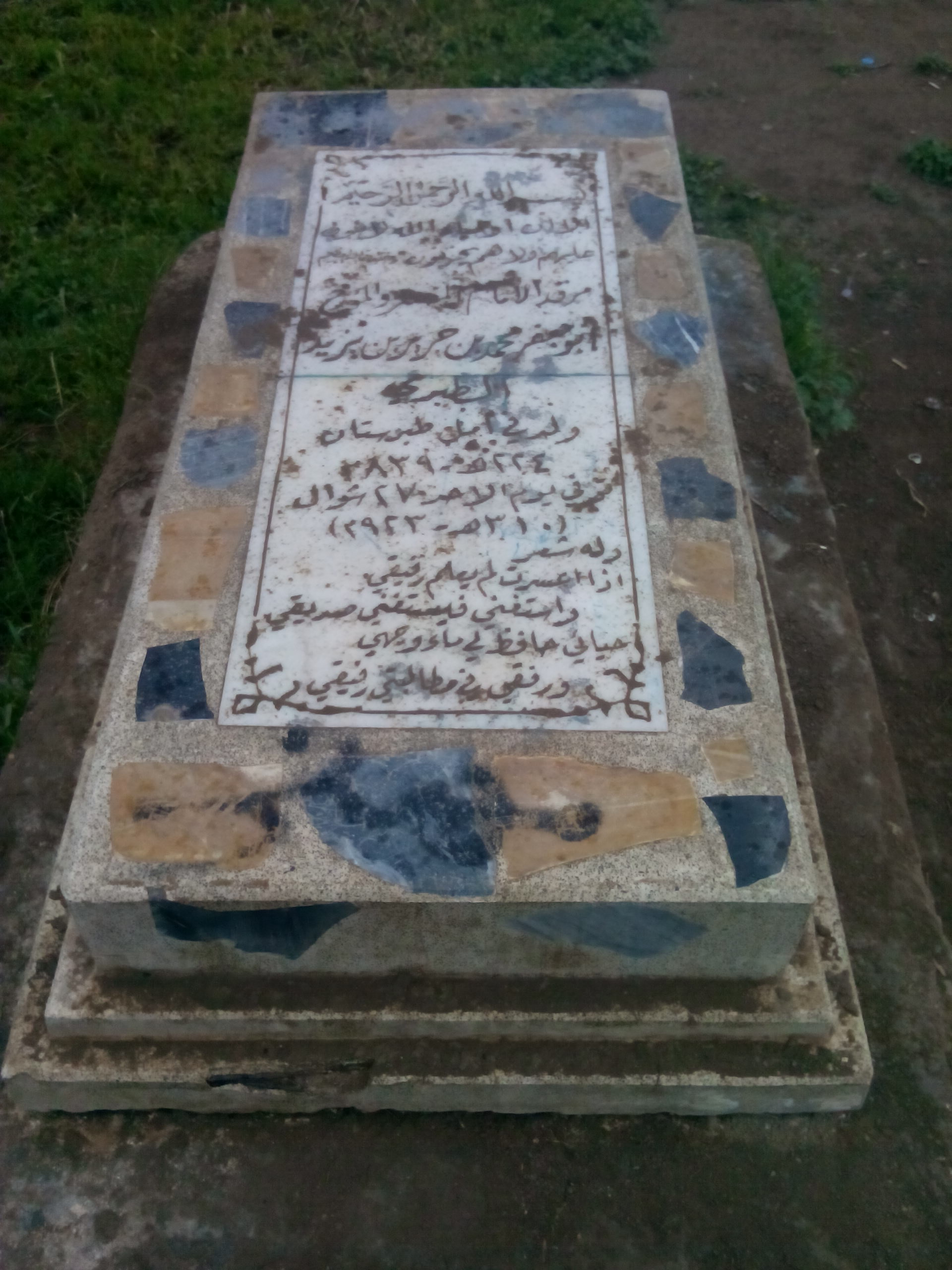
The tombstone of Al-Tabari, which reads: Abū Jaʿfar Muḥammad ibn Jarīr ibn Yazīd al-Ṭabarī was born in Tabaristan, Shawwal 270 (224–310 AH). His poetry says, “If I live long, my Lord does not know, and I become self-sufficient, so my friend becomes self-sufficient, my life, the protector of my face, my prosperity, my demand, my companion.”

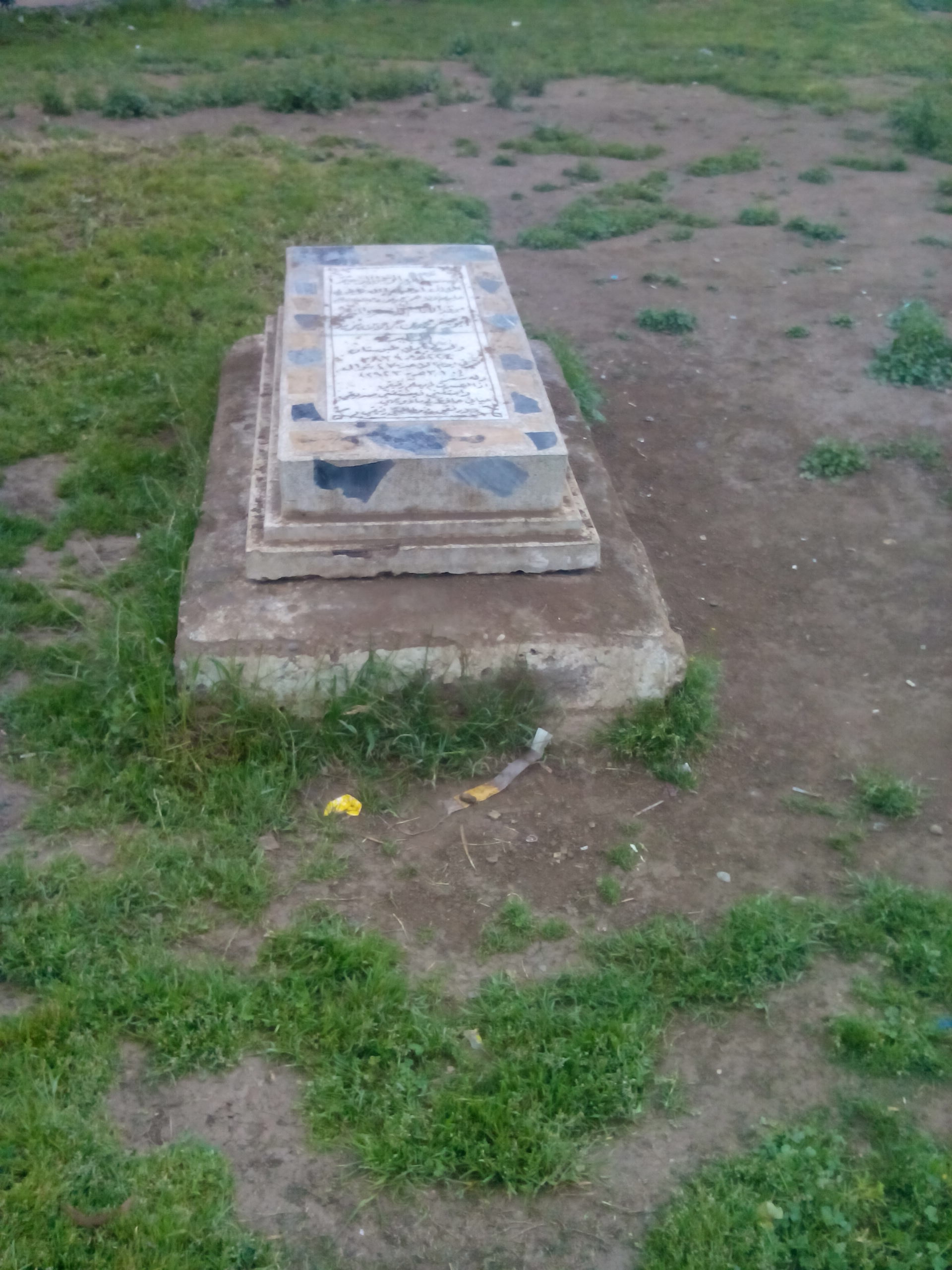
The tomb in 2017

== See also ==
- Garden of Ridván, Baghdad
- Sami Abdulrahman Park
