= Al-Adab al-Mufrad =

Book by Al-Bukhari

- Author: Muhammad al-Bukhari
- Original title: الأدب المفرد
- Language: Arabic
- Genre: Topical Hadith collection

Al-Adab al-Mufrad (Arabic: الأدب المفرد) is a topical book of hadiths collected by Muhammad al-Bukhari addressing the question of perfecting Muslim manners.

== Description ==
The book has hadith about the manners of Islamic prophet Muhammad. It has 1,322 hadiths. This book is overshadowed by Imam al-Bukhari's other book, the classic collection of hadiths, al-Jami' al-Sahih.

Although al-Adab al-Mufrad was also a significant work of his, Imam al-Bukhari did not make it a requirement that the hadiths within al-Adab al-Mufrad meet the very strict and stringent conditions of authenticity which he laid down for his al-Jami' al-Sahih. However, based on the writings of later scholars who explained, commented and/or traced and classified the chains of narration within al-Adab al-Mufrad, most of the narrations within it were ruled to be authentic or at the least sound.

== Contents ==
1. Parents
2. Ties of Kinship
3. Mawlas
4. Looking After Girls
5. Looking After Children
6. Neighbours
7. Generosity and Orphans
8. Children Dying
9. Being a Master
10. Responsibility
11. Correctness
12. Dealing with people cheerfully
13. Consultation
14. Dealings with people and good character
15. Cursing and Defamation
16. Praising People
17. Visiting and Guests
18. The Elderly
19. Children
20. Mercy
21. Social Behaviour
22. Separation
23. Advice
24. Defamation
25. Extravagance in Building
26. Compassion
27. Attending to this world
28. Injustice
29. Illness and Visiting those who are ill
30. General Behaviour
31. Supplication
32. Guests and Spending
33. Speech
34. Names
35. Kunyas
36. Poetry
37. Words
38. General Behaviour
39. Omens
40. Sneezing and Yawning
41. Gestures
42. Greeting
43. Asking Permission to Enter
44. People of the Book
45. Letters and greetings
46. Gatherings
47. Humor
48. Sitting and lying down
49. Mornings and evenings
50. Sleeping and going to bed
51. Animals
52. Midday Naps
53. Circumcision
54. Betting and similar pastimes
55. Various
56. Aspects of Behavior
57. Anger
