= Al-Dahhak ibn Makhlad =

Hadith narrator (740–828)

- Title: Abu Asim al-Nabil

Personal life
- Born: Al-Dahhak ibn Makhlad ibn Al-Dahhak ibn Muslim ibn Al-Dahhak; 740/123 AH Basra
- Died: 828/14th Dhu'l-Hijja, 212 AH Basra
- Parent: Mukhlid bin Al-Dahhak bin Muslim Al-Shaibani (father)
- Era: 8th-9th centuries
- Region: Basra, Shaybani tribe
- Main interest(s): Hadith, Fiqh
- Notable work(s): Narrations in Sahih Al-Bukhari, Sunan ibn Majah
- Occupation: Hadith scholar

Religious life
- Religion: Islam
- Creed: Sunni

Senior posting
- Influenced by: Ibn Jurayj, Ata ibn Abi Rabah, Ibn `Abbas
- Influenced: Subsequent generations of hadith scholars

Al-Dahhak ibn Makhlad (الضحاك بن مخلد; 123 AH - 212 AH), also known as Abu Asim al-Nabil (Arabic: أبو عاصم النبيل), was an Islamic scholar and hadith narrator. Known for his reliability and scholarly contributions, he played a significant role in the preservation and transmission of hadiths. His works are frequently cited in prominent hadith collections, reflecting his esteemed position among the scholars of his time. Al-Dahhak's legacy continues to influence Islamic scholarship, particularly in the fields of hadith and fiqh. He died in Basra in 212 AH during the caliphate of Al-Ma'mun.

== Early life ==
Al-Dahhak ibn Makhlad, also known as Abu Asim al-Nabil, was born in 123 AH. His full name was Al-Dahhak ibn Makhlad ibn Al-Dahhak ibn Muslim ibn Al-Dahhak (Arabic: الضَّحاك بن مَخلَد بن الضحاك بن مسلم بن الضحاك). He was renowned for his association with the Shaybani and Basri regions.

== Hadith contributions ==
Al-Dahhak ibn Makhlad was a notable figure in the study and narration of hadiths. He narrated several hadiths through prominent chains of narration. For instance, he narrated from Ibn Jurayj via Ata ibn Abi Rabah via Ibn Abbas.

Another significant chain of narration includes Al-Abbas ibn Abd Al-Azim Al-Anbari via Al-Dahhak ibn Makhlad via Muhammad ibn Rifa'ah via Suhayl ibn Abi-Salih via his father via Abu Hurayrah. This narration is recorded in Sunan ibn Majah.

== Scholarly recognition ==
Al-Dahhak was recognized as a reliable and learned faqih. His dedication to the study of hadith and fiqh earned him a respected position among scholars of his time. His works and narrations are referenced in various hadith collections.

== Death and legacy ==
Al-Dahhak ibn Makhlad died in Basra on Thursday night, the 14th of Dhu'l-Hijja, 212 AH, during the caliphate of Al-Ma'mun. His contributions to hadith studies have been acknowledged by numerous scholars. He is remembered for his piety, scholarly dedication, and the high regard in which he was held by his contemporaries.

== See also ==
- Ibn Abi Asim
