= Fatima bint Mundhir =

Hadith scholar from Medina (668–763)

Fatima bint al-Mundhir ibn Zubayr
- فاطمة بنت المنذر بن الزبير

Personal life
- Born: 668; Medina, Rashidun Caliphate
- Died: 763; Medina
- Spouse: Hisham ibn Urwah

Religious life
- Religion: Islam

Fatima bint al-Mundhir ibn al-Zubayr (Arabic: فاطمة بنت المنذر بن الزبير) (668–763) was a hadith scholar from Medina, who belonged to the generation of tabi'un. She is a prominent Hadith narrator within Sunni Hadiths.

== Education ==
Fatima bint Mundhir obtained her knowledge on hadiths from Asma bint Abu Bakr and Umm Salamah. As an evidence of the transmission of the knowledge from them in the chain of transmitters in the six collections of the hadiths, the name of Fatima bint Mundhir occupies the second place.

== Contribution to the six main collections of the hadiths ==
There are 21 hadiths in Sahih Bukhari where her name is mentioned, in two it goes directly: in the hadith 922, in the book 11, and in the hadith 5783, in the book 76.

In Sahih Muslim there are 9 hadiths, where in the hadith 5740 in the book 39 Fatima bint Muhdhir appeared together with her daughter Urwa bint Zubair.

In the following collections Sunan Abu Dawood there are 5 hadiths, in Jami' at-Tirmidhi there are 3 hadiths, the same number in Al-Sunan al-Sughra and in Sunan ibn Majah there are 4 hadiths.

== Legacy ==
Fatima bint Mundhir was married to her cousin Hisham ibn ‘Urwah ibn al-Zubayr, who was a known scholar in hadiths and memorized many hadiths from his aunt Aisha. Interestingly enough, she memorized the bigger number of the hadiths than her husband, due her learning from Asma bint Abu Bakr. Despite being a hadith scholar, she became one of the great female representatives of the tabi'un generation, she achieved the title of faqih (jurist).
