= Francis Clark Murgotten =

Francis Clark Murgotten (1880–1960) was an Episcopal minister and a scholar of languages, best known for his 1924 translation of part of the 9th-century historian Al-Baladhuri's account of the Arab conquests, Futuh al-Buldan.

== Life ==
Murgotten was born in San Jose, California, February 14, 1880. He studied at Stanford University, graduating Bachelor of Arts in 1901 and Master of Arts in 1908, the same year that he was ordained an Episcopal minister. From 1908 to 1918, he served as minister at various Episcopal churches in California while also teaching language and literature of the Old Testament at Church Divinity School of the Pacific. He obtained a doctorate in philosophy from Columbia University in 1924, with a thesis on Al-Baladhuri's Futuh al-Buldan, and taught at the University of Nevada, Reno, 1922–1950. He also acted as chaplain to chapters of the American Legion and the Benevolent and Protective Order of Elks. He died in Berkeley, California, August 11, 1960, and was buried at Oak Hill Memorial Park.

== Works ==
- The Origins of the Islamic State, vol. 2 (New York, 1924); reprinted 1968
