= Abu Thawr =

Islamic scholar of Abbasid era

Abu Thawr al-Baghdadi
- أبو ثور البغدادي

Personal life
- Born: 147 H/ 764 CE
- Died: 240 H/ 854 CE
- Era: Abbasid era
- Region: Abbasid Caliphate

Religious life
- Religion: Islam
- Denomination: Sunni
- School: Shafi‘i/Ijtihad
- Lineage: al-Kalbi
- Profession: Faqih, scholar

Muslim leader
- Teacher: Al-Shafi'i
- Students: Junayd of Baghdad

Ibrahim ibn Khalid al-Kalbi al-Baghdadi (764–854) better known as Abu Thawr (Arabic: أَبُو ثَوْر) was an early Arab scholar of Islam. He was born in 170 AH.

Abu Thawr was a student of Al-Shafi. A personal school was built by the followers of Abu Thawr which disappeared by the 4th century Hijra. Abu Thawr was asked, "Who are the Qadariyyah?" and he replied:

"The Qadariyyah are those who say Allaah did not create the actions of the servants and that Allah did not decree acts of disobedience for the servants and that He did not create them (the acts of disobedience). Therefore these Qadariyyah are not be prayed behind, nor are their sick to be visited and nor are their funerals to be attended. Their repentance from this saying should be sought. If they repent (then so) and if not then their necks are to be struck."

== Views ==
Abu Thawr, Al-Karrabisi, Dawud al-Zahiri, and their followers adhered to Ibn kullab, and they held that the Qur’an, as it is the speech of God and one of His attributes, should not be considered created. They argued that reciting or speaking the Qur’an does not constitute a creation; rather, it is a narration of God’s speech and not the Qur’an itself.

In jurisprudence, Abu Thawr followed the Hanafi school. When Al-Shafi‘i arrived in Baghdad, he followed him, studied his books, and disseminated his knowledge. He was counted among the ranks of Al-Shafi‘i’s companions, but he reached the level of independent ijtihad, thus establishing his own jurisprudential school.

== Sources ==
- Wael B. Hallaq. The Origins and Evolution of Islamic Law. (Cambridge: Cambridge University Press, 2005) p. 168
- Ahmed el-Shamsy. "Canonization beyond the Shāfiʿī School", The Canonization of Islamic Law, Cambridge University Press, pp. 194–220
- "The Adversaries of Aḥmad Ibn Ḥanbal", 1997 Christopher Melchert.
