= Al-Muhasibi =

Arab theologian and scholar (781–857)

al-Ḥārith al-Muhāsibī المحاسبي

Personal life
- Born: 781 CE; 170 AH; Basra, Abbasid Caliphate (now Basra, Basra Governorate, Iraq)
- Died: 857 CE (aged 73); 243 AH; Baghdad, Abbasid Caliphate
- Era: Islamic Golden Age
- Region: Abbasid Caliphate
- Main interest(s): Sufism, Aqidah, Kalam (Islamic Theology)
- Notable idea(s): Baghdad School of Islamic philosophy, Muhasabah
- Notable work(s): Kitab al-Khalwa, Kitab al-Ri`aya li-huquq Allah, Kitab al-Wasaya

Religious life
- Religion: Islam
- Denomination: Sunni
- Jurisprudence: Shafi'i
- Creed: Kullabi

Muslim leader
- Influenced by: Al-Shafi'i, al-Hasan al-Basri, Ibn Kullab al-Karibisi
- Influenced: Sirri Saqti, Junayd al-Baghdadi, al-Ghazali

Al-Muḥāsibī (Arabic: المحاسبي; full name Abū ʿAbd Allāh Ḥārith ibn Asad ibn ʿAbd Allāh al-ʿAnizī al-Baṣrī; c. 781–857 CE; AH 165–243) was an Arab Shāfiʿī theologian, philosopher, ascetic, and early Sufi mystic. Born in Basra and belonging to the Arab Anazzah tribe, he turned to ascetic renunciation and moral purification and is regarded as the first Sunni mystic to formulate a theologically systematic approach to God. He is also considered a founder of the Baghdad school of Islamic thought that combined kalam with Sufism, and was a teacher of the Sufi masters Junayd al-Baghdadi and Sirri Saqti. His approach became formative for what later developed into mainstream Sufi doctrine and influenced subsequent theologians, including Al-Ghazali.

The name al-Muḥāsibī, meaning "he who examines his conscience", derives from muḥāsaba, self-examination or spiritual accounting, a practice that occupied a central place in his teaching. He emphasized ascetic discipline and moral purification, and gave particular importance to the Day of Judgement, while balancing this with a vision of the glory of the heavenly reward.

Al-Muḥāsibī was a prolific author, with approximately 200 works attributed to him. His writings treated both theology and taṣawwuf and included Kitāb al-Khalwa and Kitāb al-riʿāya li-ḥuqūq Allāh ("The Book of Observance of That Which Is Owed to God", also rendered "Obeying God's Permits"). The latter is a work of spiritual counsel that gives particular prominence to muḥāsaba, the disciplined examination of one's own conscience and conduct.

== Life ==
Al-Muhasibi was born in Basra, and his parents later moved to Baghdad, which had become the Abbasid capital. His father accumulated considerable wealth, which al-Muhasibi is reported to have rejected due to theological disagreements concerning his father’s views on the createdness of the Qur'an. Despite this background, al-Muhasibi adopted an ascetic lifestyle and was influenced by the teachings of al-Hasan al-Basri.

Al-Muhasibi wrote extensively on ethical self-discipline and spiritual introspection. He addressed contemporary Sufi practices such as wearing woolen garments, night recitation of the Qur'an, and dietary restraint, arguing that while such practices could aid in controlling the passions, they could also foster hypocrisy or pride if they became outward displays of piety rather than expressions of inner reform. He emphasised the importance of continual self-examination in preparation for the Day of Judgement as a means of purifying the inner self.

He studied jurisprudence under al-Shafi'i before later associating with a group of theologians led by Abdullah ibn Kullāb. This circle opposed the doctrines of the Jahmis, Mu'tazilis, and anthropomorphist theologians. Ibn Kullab argued against the Mu'tazilite position that the Qur'an was created, introducing a distinction between God’s eternal speech and its temporal expression.

In 848 (or possibly 851), the Abbasid caliph al-Mutawakkil formally ended the Mihna, the inquisition enforcing Mu'tazilite doctrine, and subsequently prohibited Mu'tazilite theology.

In his work al-Khalwa, al-Muhasibi discussed the themes of fear and hope, advocating renunciation of worldly attachment as a prerequisite for spiritual discipline:

Know that the first thing that corrects you and helps you correct others is renouncing this world. For renunciation is attained by realisation, and consideration is attained by reflection...

== See also ==
- List of Sufis
