= Ar-Rabi' ibn Sulayman al-Muradi =

Egyptian Shafi'i jurist and hadith transmitter

Al-Rabiʿ ibn Sulayman al-Muradi
- أَبُو مُحَمَّدٍ ٱلرَّبِيعُ بْنُ سُلَيْمَانَ ٱلْمُرَادِيُّ

Personal life
- Born: c. 790 or 791 CE Egypt
- Died: 884 CE Egypt
- Era: Abbasid Caliphate
- Main interest(s): Fiqh, Hadith

Religious life
- Religion: Islam
- Denomination: Sunni
- Jurisprudence: Shafi'i

Muslim leader
- Influenced by: Al-Shafi'i
- Influenced: Shafi'i scholars of Egypt

Abū Muḥammad al-Rabīʿ ibn Sulaymān al-Murādī (c. 790–884 CE) was an Egyptian Muslim jurist, hadith scholar, and one of the foremost transmitters of the works and teachings of Imam al-Shāfiʿī. He is considered among the most important early authorities of the Shafi'i school because much of al-Shāfiʿī's later doctrine was preserved through his narrations.

== Life ==
Al-Rabīʿ was born in Egypt. He became a close student of Imam al-Shāfiʿī during the latter's final years after the imam settled in Egypt. He carefully transmitted al-Shāfiʿī's teachings, legal opinions, and books and became one of the principal authorities through whom the Egyptian recension of Shāfiʿī doctrine was preserved.

Biographical scholars describe him as reliable, precise in transmission, and devoted to scholarship.

== Role in transmitting al-Shafiʿi’s works ==
Al-Rabīʿ is especially known as a primary narrator of:

- Al-Umm — al-Shāfiʿī's major legal compendium
- al-Risāla — foundational treatise on legal theory

Many surviving manuscripts and chains of transmission of these works pass through him, which made his narrations central to the formation of later Shāfiʿī jurisprudence.

== Students ==
Among those who transmitted from or studied with him were Egyptian jurists and hadith scholars who continued spreading Shāfiʿī doctrine after the first generation of the school.

== Legacy ==
Within the Shāfiʿī tradition, al-Rabīʿ is regarded as one of the most trustworthy transmitters of the school's foundational texts. Later jurists frequently relied on his narrations when determining the authentic positions of al-Shāfiʿī.
