= Al-Tabari =

Muslim scholar, historian, and Quranic exegete (839–923)

- ٱلطَّبَرِيّ
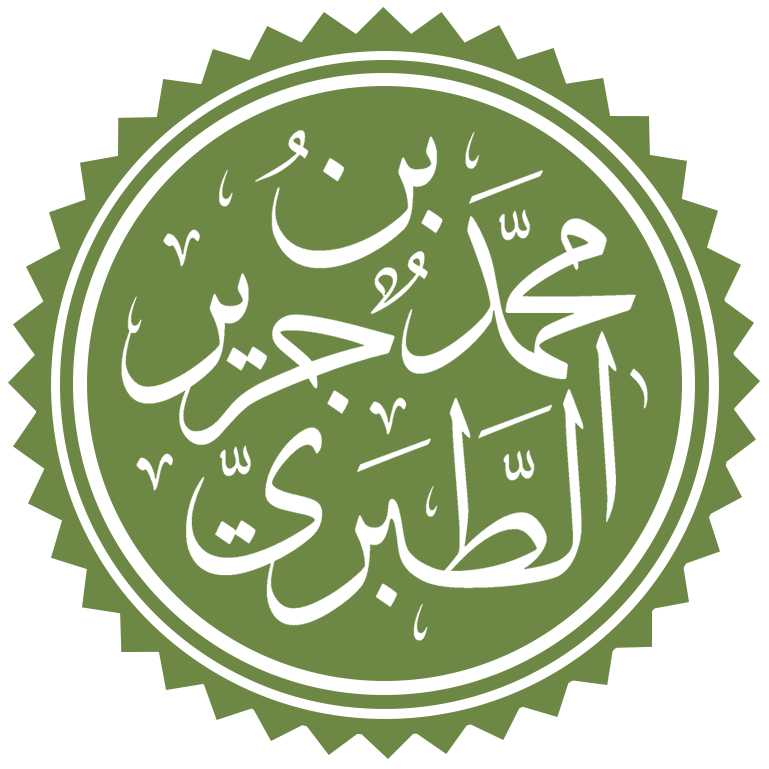
- Title: Imam

Personal life
- Born: 839 CE / 224 AH Amol, Tabaristan, Abbasid Caliphate (present-day Iran)
- Died: 923 CE / 310 AH (aged 84) Baghdad, Abbasid Caliphate (present-day Iraq)
- Resting place: Al-Rahbi Park, Baghdad, Iraq
- Era: Islamic Golden Age
- Region: Abbasid Caliphate
- Main interests: History; exegesis; jurisprudence; creed
- Notable works: Tafsir al-Tabari; Tarikh al-Tabari; Tahdhib al-Athar; Ikhtilaf al-Fuqaha'
- Occupation: Scholar; historian; exegete; jurist; theologian

Religious life
- Religion: Islam
- Denomination: Sunni
- Jurisprudence: Mujtahid (eponym of the Jariri school)
- Creed: Athari

Muslim leader
- Influenced by: Dawud al-Zahiri; Ar-Rabi‘ ibn Sulayman al-Muradi
- Influenced: Al-Suyuti; Ibn Kathir
- Arabic name
- Personal (Ism): Muḥammad مُحَمَّد
- Patronymic (Nasab): Ibn Jarīr Ibn Yazīd ٱبْن جَرِير ٱبْن يَزِيد
- Teknonymic (Kunya): Abū Jaʿfar أَبُو جَعْفَر
- Toponymic (Nisba): Al-Ṭabarī ٱلطَّبَرِيّ

Abū Jaʿfar Muḥammad ibn Jarīr ibn Yazīd al-Ṭabarī (Arabic: أَبُو جَعْفَر مُحَمَّد بْن جَرِير بْن يَزِيد ٱلطَّبَرِيّ; 839–923 CE; 224–310 AH), commonly known as al-Ṭabarī (Arabic: ٱلطَّبَرِيّ), was a prominent Sunni Muslim scholar, polymath, historian, Quranic exegete, jurist, and theologian from Amol, Tabaristan, in present-day Iran. One of the prominent scholars of the Islamic Golden Age, he was particularly renowned for his works on world history and Quranic exegesis and has been described as "an impressively prolific polymath". His writings included history, law, theology, poetry, lexicography, grammar, ethics, mathematics, and medicine.

Al-Tabari's two most famous and influential works were his universal chronicle Taʾrīkh al-Rusul wa-l-Mulūk ("Chronicle of the Apostles and Kings") and his extensive Quranic commentary, Tafsir al-Tabari. The latter assembled earlier exegetical traditions on a vast scale and became a standard work of reference for later Quranic commentators, remaining in use into the modern period.

In jurisprudence, al-Tabari followed the Shafi'i school for nearly a decade before developing an independent interpretation of Islamic law. His juridical thought remained sophisticated and fluid, and he continued to develop his views on legal questions throughout his life. He consequently founded an independent school of sharīʿa, commonly known as the Jariri school. Although closely related to the Shafi'i tradition, it developed a distinct following and "flourished among Sunni ulama for two centuries after his death" before eventually becoming extinct.

== Biography ==
Tabari was born in Amol, Tabaristan (some 20 km south of the Caspian Sea) in the winter of 838–39. He has been described as either of Persian or Arab origin. He memorized the Qur'an at seven, was a qualified prayer leader at eight, and began to study the prophetic traditions at nine. He left home to study in 236 AH (850/1 AD), when he was twelve. He retained close ties to his hometown. He returned at least twice, the second time in 290 AH (903 AD), when his outspokenness caused some uneasiness and led to his quick departure.

He first went to Ray (Rhages), where he remained for some five years. A major teacher in Rayy was Abu Abdullah Muhammad ibn Humayd al-Razi, who had earlier taught in Baghdad, but was now in his seventies While in Ray, he also studied Muslim jurisprudence according to the Hanafi school. Among other material, ibn Humayd taught Jarir Tabari the historical works of ibn Ishaq, especially al-Sirah, the life of Muhammad. Tabari was thus introduced in youth to pre-Islamic and early Islamic history. Tabari quotes ibn Humayd frequently, but little is known about Tabari's other teachers in Rayy.

Tabari then travelled to study in Baghdad under Ahmad ibn Hanbal, who, however, had recently died (in late 855 or early 856). Tabari possibly made a pilgrimage prior to his first arrival in Baghdad. He left Baghdad probably in 242 AH (856/7 AD) to travel through the southern cities of Basra, Kufah and Wasit. There, he met a number of eminent and venerable scholars. In addition to his previous study of Hanafi law, Tabari also studied the Shafi'i, Maliki and Zahiri rites. Tabari's study of the latter school was with the founder, Dawud al-Zahiri, and Tabari hand-copied and transmitted many of his teacher's works. Tabari was then well-versed in four of the five remaining Sunni legal schools, before founding his own independent, yet eventually extinct, school. His debates with his former teachers and classmates were known, and served as a demonstration of said independence. Notably missing from this list is the Hanbali school, the fourth largest legal school within Sunni Islam in the present era. Tabari's view of Ibn Hanbal, the school's founder, became decidedly negative later in life. Tabari did not give Ibn Hanbal's dissenting opinion any weight at all when considering the various views of jurists, stating that Ibn Hanbal had not even been a jurist at all but merely a recorder of Hadith.

On his return to Baghdad, he took a tutoring position from the vizier, Ubaydallah ibn Yahya ibn Khaqan. This would have been before A.H. 244 (858), since the vizier was out of office and in exile from 244 to 248 (858–9 to 862). There is an anecdote telling that Tabari had agreed to tutor for ten dinars a month, but his teaching was so effective and the boy's writing so impressive that the teacher was offered a tray of dinars and dirhams. The ever-ethical Tabari declined the offer, saying he had undertaken to do his work at the specified amount, and could not honorably take more. That is one of a number of narratives about him declining gifts or giving gifts of equal or greater amount in return.

In his late twenties, he travelled to Syria, Palestine, India and Egypt. In Beirut, he made the highly significant connection of al-Abbas ibn al-Walid ibn Mazyad al-'Udhri al-Bayruti (c. 169–270/785–86 to 883–84). Al-Abbas instructed Tabari in the Syrian school's variant readings of the Qur'an and transmitted through his father al-Walid the legal views of al-Awza'i, Beirut's prominent jurist from a century earlier.

Tabari arrived in Egypt in 253 AH (867 AD), and some time after 256/870, he returned to Baghdad, possibly making a pilgrimage on the way. If so, he did not stay long in the Hijaz. Tabari had a private income from his father while he was still living, and then the inheritance. He took money for teaching. Among Tabari's students was Ibn al-Mughallis, who was also a student of Tabari's own teacher Muhammad bin Dawud al-Zahiri; Ibn al-Mughallis lavished Tabari with almost excessive praise. He never took a government or a judicial position.

Tabari was some fifty years old when al-Mu'tadid became caliph. He was well past seventy in the year his History was published. During the intervening years, he was a famous (if somewhat controversial) personality. Among the figures of his age, he had access to sources of information equal to anyone, except, perhaps, those who were directly connected with decision making within the government. Most, if not all, the materials for the histories of al-Mu'tadid, al-Muktafi, and the early years of al-Muqtadir, were collected by him about the time the reported events took place. His accounts are as authentic as one can expect from that period. Tabari final years were marked by conflict with the Hanbalite followers of Al-Hasan ibn 'Ali al-Barbahari, a student of the students of Ibn Hanbal. Tabari was known for his view that Hanbalism was not a legitimate school of thought, as Ibn Hanbal was a compiler of traditions and not a proper jurist. The Hanbalites of Baghdad would often stone Tabari's house, escalating the persecution to the point where Abbasid authorities had to subdue them by force. The Baghdad chief of police tried to organize a debate between Tabari and the Hanbalites to settle their differences. While Tabari accepted, the Hanbalites did not show up, but instead came later to pelt his house with stones again. The constant threat of violence from the Hanbalites hung over Tabari's head for the rest of his life.

Tabari died on 17 February 923. Some sources suggest that Abbasid authorities buried Tabari at night in secret as they feared mob violence by the Hanbalites, but these reports are uncertain, and other sources agree that he was buried in the morning after his death. Ibn Khallikān reports that a grave in al-Qarāfah al-Ṣughrā in Egypt was at times attributed to al-Ṭabarī, and that some visitors identified it as the tomb of the historian. However, Ibn Khallikān rejects this attribution and affirms that al-Ṭabarī died and was buried in Baghdad. He further cites Ibn Yūnus in his Tārīkh Miṣr (History of Egypt), who also records that al-Ṭabarī died in Baghdad, reinforcing the view that the Egyptian attribution is erroneous. Regardless, Tabari was remembered positively by contemporaries such as Ibn Duraid, and the Hanbalites were condemned by Abbasid authorities in their entirety for persecuting opponents, roughly a decade later. They even prevented people from meeting with him, and Ibn Jarir remained trapped in his home until he died. The period in which Tabari lived was full of religious differences and political unrest, which was characterized by the stigmatization and accusation of individuals.

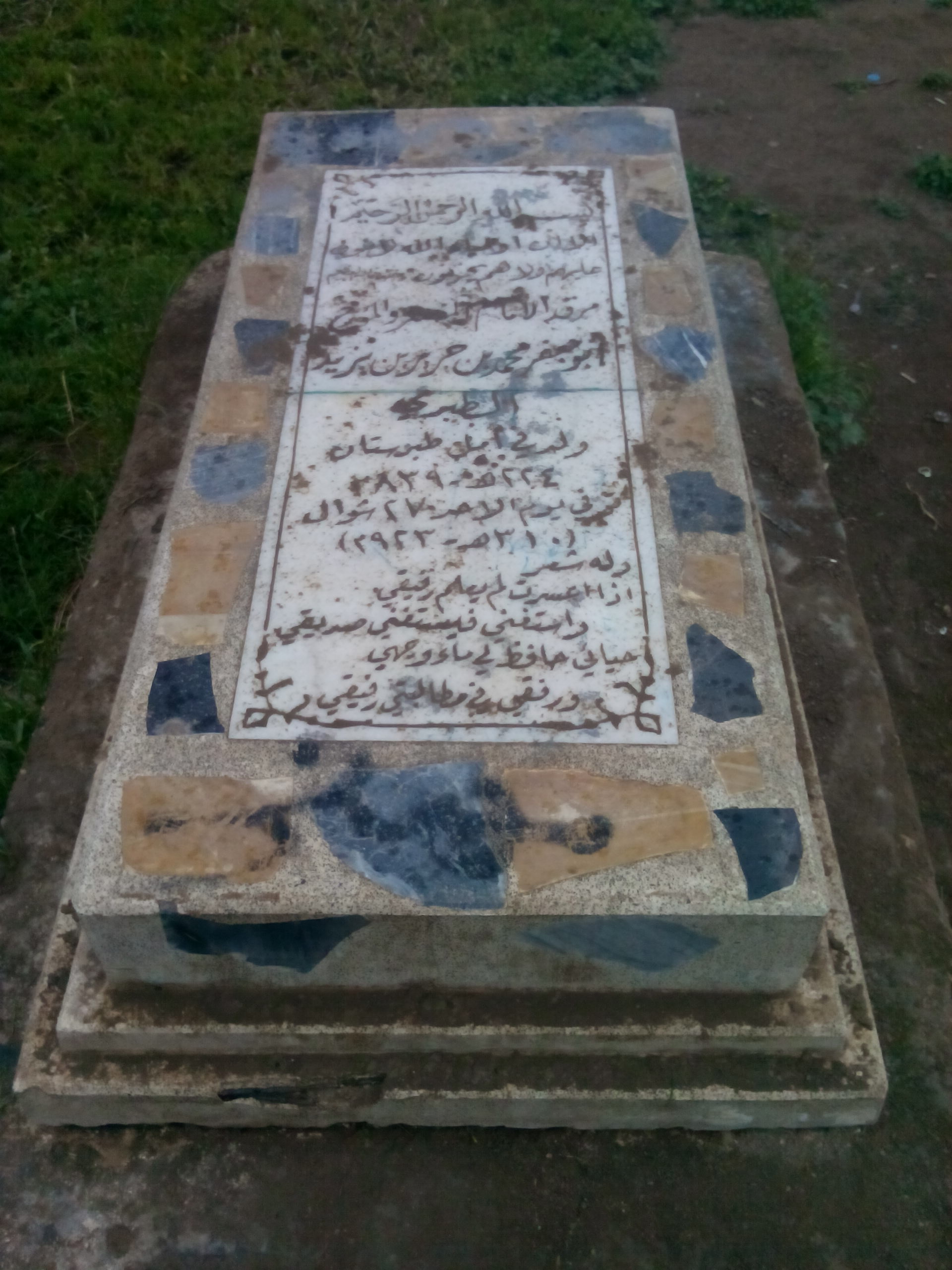
Tomb of al-Tabari in Baghdad, Iraq

== Personal characteristics ==
He is described as having a dark complexion, large eyes and a long beard. He was tall and slender and his hair and beard remained black until he was very old. He was attentive to his health, avoiding red meat, fats, and other foods he deemed unhealthy. He was seldom sick before his last decade, when he suffered from bouts of pleurisy. When he was ill, he treated himself (to the disapproval of physicians). He had a sense of humor, though serious subjects he treated seriously. He had studied poetry when young and enjoyed writing, reciting and participating in poetic exchanges. It is said that he was asked in Egypt about al-Tirimmah, and was able to recite this 7th century poet's work for Egyptians who had merely heard al-Tirimmah's name. Ali ibn al-Athir, in his memoirs, confirmed these features. He was witty and urbane, clean, and well mannered. He avoided coarse speech, instead displaying refined eloquence. He had a good grounding in grammar, lexicography, and philology. Such were considered essential for Qur'anic commentary. He knew Persian and was acquainted with the origins of various foreign loan words in Arabic from a number of other languages.

He died in Baghdad on 17 February 923.

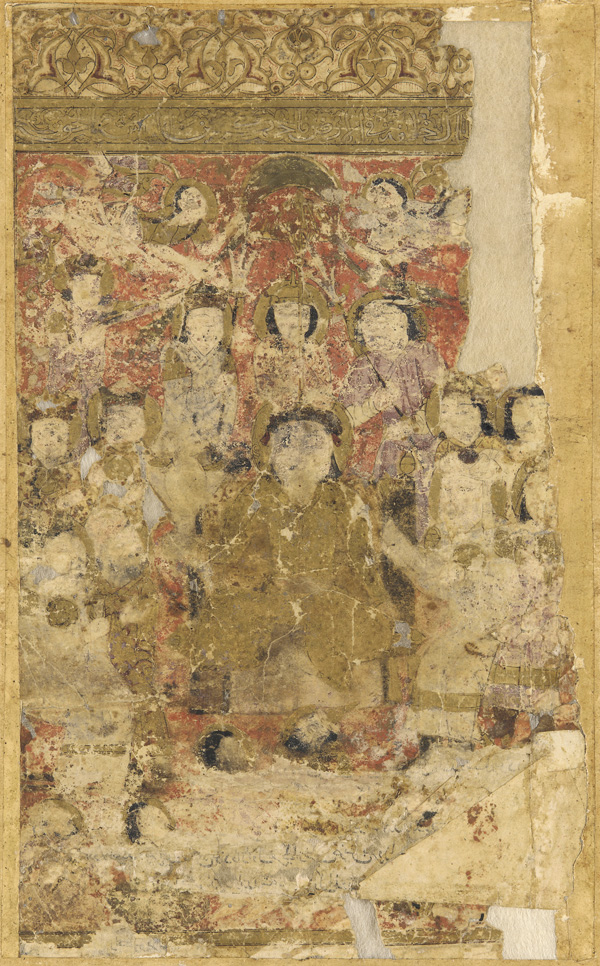
Bal'ami's 14th century Persian version of Universal History by Tabari

== Tabari's ordeal with Hanbalites ==
His ijtihad (independent judgement) led to criticism from the Zahiri and some Hanbali followers. Though his conflict with the leaders of the Zahiri school was resolved, his disagreements with the Hanbalis were more deep-set, leading to a violent altercation in which he was besieged in his own home. The disagreement was mainly jurisprudential -- al-Tabari did not seem to think much of ibn Hanbal as a jurist, but mainly saw him as a scholar of hadith. Al-Tabari was also accused of being a Jahmite heretic, while his respect for 'Ali ibn Abi Talib exposed him to accusations of Shi'ite sympathies. At the same time, he incurred the wrath of the Shi'ites by defending the previous three caliphs.

In Baghdad, three Hanbalites (who do not seem further identifiable) asked al-Tabari about his views on a tradition attributed to Mujahid ibn Jabr, concerning the explanation of the verse 79 from Surat al-Isra' in the Qur'an about the Praiseworthy Station of Muhammad, known as "al-Maqam al-Mahmud".

The verse is: And rise at ˹the last˺ part of the night, offering additional prayers, so your Lord may raise you to a station of praise.^{[Quran 17:79]}

In the books of Tafsir (interpretation of the Qur'an), authors said that the Praiseworthy Station (al-Maqam al-Mahmud) said in the above verse is the most highest place in Paradise, which will be granted to Muhammad and none else, and the position of intercession (Shafa'a) will be giving to him by permission of God on behalf of the believers on the Day of Judgment. Muhammad will intercede on their behalf, so that God will relieve them of the suffering of such a situation. However, the Hanbalites interpreted the Praiseworthy Station as the seat of Muhammad by God on the Throne, despite the overall weakness of the narrations supporting it.

Al-Tabari is said to have declared bluntly that it was absurd. Moreover, he recited:

ولا له في عرشه جليس	سبحان من ليس له أنيس

Glory to Him (God), Who has no comrade	nor companion sitting on His Throne

Upon hearing this, the fanatic Hanbali followers attacked him fiercely, and stoned his residence and caused a serious disturbance which had to be subdued by force. Trouble with the Hanbalites that took a similar form was also reported at the time of al-Tabari's death. In connection with it, Nazuk is mentioned as chief of police. He was appointed to this position only in 310/922, the year al-Tabari died, but he appears to have held high positions in the police before, and may already have been in charge of al-Tabari's protection against potential Hanbalite violence. In 309/921, the wazir 'Ali b. 'Isa had offered al-Tabari the opportunity to debate the matter with the Hanbalites in his residence. Al-Tabari agreed, but the Hanbalites did not show up. However, shortly before his death, Hanbalite rioters supposedly pelted his house with stones so numerous that they formed a large wall in front of it.

According to Franz Rosenthal, "The role of Hanbalite hostility, though real, seems to have been exaggerated in connection with his death as it was in his life." He further adds that "Those who knew Tabari best always played down the inconveniences he suffered from the Hanbalites."

== Works ==
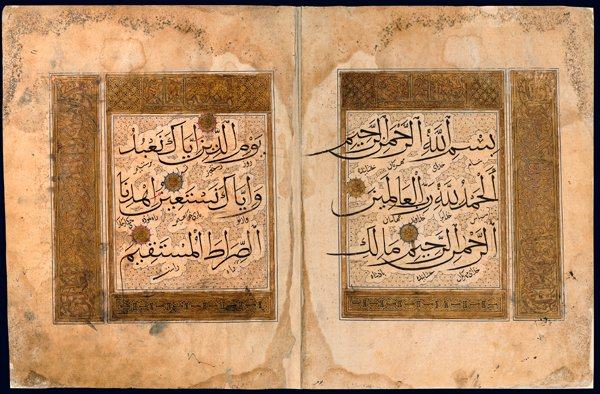
Opening lines of the Quran from a Persian translation of Tabari's commentary

Al-Tabari wrote history, theology and Qur'anic commentary. His principal and most influential works were:

- Tafsir al-Tabari ('Commentary of al-Tabari'); Qur'anic commentary (tafsir).
- Tarikh al-Rusul wa al-Muluk (History of the Prophets and Kings), historical chronicle, often referred to as Tarikh al-Tabari.

His legal texts, commentaries and Qur'anic exegesis, and history, produced respectively, were published throughout his lifetime. Biographers stress his reverence for scholarship, objectivity, and independent judgement (ijtihad). He rates the credibility of his sources from a theological rather than an historical standpoint, yet he opposed religious innovation. In one anecdote, Abu Kamil suggested him when he was near death, to forgive his enemies, which he agreed to, apart from one who called him an innovator. Tabari was generally conciliatory, moderate, and affable.

Initially, Tabari belonged to the Shafi'ite madhhab (school) of fiqh (Islamic law), and was welcomed by them. He established his own madhhab, usually designated the Jariri madhhab after his patronymic. His school failed to endure in the competitive atmosphere of the times. As a youth in Baghdad, he had applied to the Hanbalite's but received a hostile rejection.

Al-Tabari's jurisprudence belongs to a type which Christopher Melchert has called "Rationalism", largely associated with the Shafi'i madhhab. It was characterized by strong scripturalist tendencies. He appears, like Dawud al-Zahiri, to restrict consensus historically, defining it as the transmission by many authorities of reports on which the Sahaba agreed unanimously. Like Dawud al-Zahiri, he also held that consensus must be tied to a text and cannot be based on legal analogy.

While we still lack a scholarly biography of this scholar, interested readers now have access to well-annotated translation of the sections from al-Tabari's chronicle, which constitute the most important primary source for the history of his reign. Anyone familiar with al-Tabari's chronicle knows what a challenge it poses for a translator, especially for one attempting to make it accessible to an audience that includes non-specialists. There is first of all the obstacle of al-Tabari's Arabic prose, which varies greatly in style and complexity, according to the source he is using (and apparently quoting verbatim). The sections in the McAuliffe translation, drawn mostly from al-Mada'ini and Umar ibn Shabba, do not represent the most obscure passages to be found in al-Tabari, but they are nonetheless full of linguistic ambiguities and difficulties for the translator.

He wrote extensively; his voluminous corpus containing three main titles:

- History of the Prophets and Kings – (Tarikh al-Rusul wa al-Muluk, commonly called Tarikh al-Tabari)

The first of the two large works, generally known as the Annals (Arabic Tarikh al-Tabari). This is a universal history from the time of Qur'anic Creation to 915, and is renowned for its detail and accuracy concerning Muslim and Middle Eastern history. Tabari's work is one of the major primary sources for historians. The History commenced with the Creation, followed by accounts regarding the patriarchs, prophets, and rulers of antiquity. The history of the Sasanian Empire came next. For the period of Muhammad's life, al-Ṭabarī drew upon the extensive researches of 8th-century Medinan scholars. Although pre-Islamic influences are evident in their works, the Medinan perspective of Muslim history evolved as a theocentric (god-centred) universal history of prophecy, culminating in the career of Muhammad and not as a continuum of tribal wars and values. The sources for al-Ṭabarī's History covering the years from the Prophet’s death to the fall of the Umayyad dynasty (661–750 CE) were short monographs, each treating a major event or the circumstances attending the death of an important person. Al-Ṭabarī supplemented this material with historical reports embodied in works on genealogy, poetry, and tribal affairs. Further, details of the early ʿAbbāsid period were available to him in a few histories of the caliphs that unfortunately have come down only in the fragments preserved by al-Ṭabarī. Almost all of these accounts reflected an Iraqi perspective of the community; coupled with this is al-Ṭabarī’s scant attention to affairs in Egypt, North Africa, and Muslim Spain, so that his History does not have the secular “universal” outlook sometimes attributed to it. From the beginning of the Muslim era (dated from 622, the date of the hijrah—the Prophet Muhammad’s migration from Mecca to Medina), the History is arranged as a set of annals according to the years after the hijrah. It terminates in the year 915.

- The Commentary on the Qur'an – (Commentary al-Tabari)

His second great work was the commentary on the Qur'an, (Arabic Tafsir al-Tabari), which was marked by the same fullness of detail as the Annals. Abul-Qaasim Ibn 'Aqil Al-Warraq says: " Imām Ibn Jarir once said to his students: “Are you all ready to write down my lesson on the commentary of the entire Holy Quran?" They enquired as to how lengthy it would be. "30 000 pages"! he replied. They said: "This would take a long time and cannot be completed in one lifetime. He therefore made it concise and kept it to 3000 pages (note, this was in reference to the old days when they used ink and hard-paper which was a bit long format today). It took him seven years to finish it from the year 283 until 290.

- Tahdhīb al-Athār was begun by Tabari. This was on the traditions transmitted from the Companions of Muhammad. It was not, however, completed.

A perusal of Tabari shows that he in fact relied on a variety of historians and other authors, such as Abu Mikhnaf, Sayf b. 'Umar, Ibn al-Kalbi, 'Awana ibn al-Hakam, Nasr b. Muzahim, al-Mada'ini, 'Urwa b. al-Zubayr, al-Zuhri, Ibn Ishaq, Waqidi, Wahb b. Munabbih, Ka'b al-Ahbar, Ibn al-Matni, al Hajjaj b. al-Minhal, Hisham b. 'Urwa, al-Zubayr b. Bakkar and so forth, in addition to oral accounts that were circulating at the time. In recounting his history, Tabari used numerous channels to give accounts. These are both channels that are given by the same author in a work, such as for example three different accounts that start with the isnad al-Harita.

Although no subject in history, recitation of the Quran and its interpretation, poetry, grammar and vocabulary, ethics, mathematics, and theology remained untouched by Tabari, he is primarily known as the author and author of history.

== Translations of Tabari's book ==
Theodor Nöldeke, the German orientalist in 1878 has also translated the Sassanid section of Tabari's history into German, and has since been reprinted several times.

Dutch orientalist Michael Jan de Goeje, in several volumes, translated Tabari's history book into Dutch, The book was later translated into English and republished in 1998 by State University of New York Press and Paris Diderot University. Hermann Zotenberg published the history of Tabari in French Language in four volumes in Paris. His book on the nativities and history was translated into Latin by Giovanni da Siviglia and published in Venice in 1503. Franz Rosenthal translated in 1989 Tabari history book of three volumes, with title "History of the Middle East".

Clifford Edmund Bosworth, published the book History of Tabari in three volumes with an introduction by Ehsan Yarshater in 1999 in the United States, Albania and France. Planning for the translation of this great chronicle book into English in forty volumes began in 1971, led by Ehsan Yarshater as General Editor and assisted by an Editorial Board Ihsan Abbas, American University of Beirut, Clifford Edmund Bosworth University of Manchester, Jacob Lassner Wayne State University, as Supervising Editor, and Franz Rosenthal in Yale University. Estelle Whelan at the Columbia Center for Iranian Studies served as Editorial Coordinator.

Ignác Goldziher Hungarian scholar, wrote in 1920 a book focusing on Tabari, titled in German as "Die Richtungen der islamischen Koranauslegung", and it was published by Brill Publishers. Brockhaus and Efron Encyclopedic Dictionary also published the complete History of the Prophets and Kings in 17 volumes in his center. W. Montgomery Watt researched the history of Tabari, and from 1987 to 1999 published the book History of Tabari entitled "Muhammad at Mecca". Also Manuscripts Tabari history, Tabari interpretation and translation of Tabari history stored in Central Library of Astan Quds Razavi.

Moshe Pearlman, Ismail Poonawala, Fred Donner, Hugh N. Kennedy, Khalid Yahya Blankinship, R. Stephen Humphreys, Michael G. Morony, G. R. Hawting, Martin Hinds, Carole Hillenbrand, George Saliba, and Yohanan Friedmann authors and researchers were prominent, they published a collection of books on the history of Tabari with different titles.

== Texts relating to al-Tabari ==
Al-Azdi was an extremely early witness to the reception of al-Tabari's text - indeed, much earlier than the sources that are customarily used to improve our understanding of the Tarikh al-rusul wa-l-muluk, e.g., Miskawayh, Ibn Asakir, Ibn al-Athir, and Ibn Khallikan. Second, since al-Azdi was writing in the decades following al-Tabari, his Tarikh can say something about the reception of al-Tabari Tarikh among those who immediately followed the great master. That al-Tabari's history was immensely significant we can all agree; but as to precisely how he became so significant there is no clear consensus. Returning to Forand's insight, al-Azdi frequently drew on the same authorities tapped by al-Tabari, but whose works are for the most part now lost, such as Abu Ma'shar (170/786), Abu Mikhnaf (157/774), al-Haytham ibn 'Adi (207/822), al-Madaini (around 228/843), and 'Umar ibn Shabba (262/878).

Realistic depictions alternate with formalized and archetypal narrative. Tabari is careful to give his reports of these conquests a religious frame (expressions such as "Nu'aym wrote to 'Umar about the victory that God had given him" [pp. 25–26] abound), though it is worth noting that Tabari describes the initiation of the campaign in pragmatic rather than ideological terms. He states that 'Umar's decision to invade came as a result of his realization Yazdegerd was making war on him every year, and when it was suggested to him that he would continue to do this until he was driven out of his kingdom" (p. 2). The religious frame in Tabari's account is therefore not inflexible or exclusive.

== Reception ==
In 2015, a statue of Jarir Tabari, along with another Iranian scientist, Muhammad ibn Zakariya al-Razi, was erected in the courtyard of the National Library of Tajikistan. There are streets and schools named after him in Riyadh, Doha, Amol, Qazvin, Khobar, Aqaba, Madaba, Beirut, Dhahran, Heliopolis, Kuwait, Homs, Hama and Baghdad.

Abdolhossein Zarrinkoob and Lefebvre Lucidio in a speech at the Oxford Centre for Islamic Studies, founded the Tabari History Research Structure Institute. The Jarir Tabari first international commemoration in 1989, with a suggestion by Mohammad Ebrahim Bastani Parizi was held by Kayhan magazine at Mazandaran University. In 1987, The ERTU (Egyptian Radio and Television Union) produced the first TV series that presented the life of Jarir Tabari under the name “Imam al-Tabari”, it was directed by Magdy Abou Emira starring Ezzat El Alaili. In addition to Egypt, the biographical series was shown on Arabic channels in other countries.

== See also ==
- List of biographies of Muhammad
- al-Tirmidhi
- Ibn Kullab
- Islamic scholars
- List of Persian scientists and scholars
- List of Muslim historians
- Bal'ami
