= Muhasaba =

Muhasaba (Arabic: المحاسبة) is an Arabic term that means self-reflection, self-criticism, or taking account of one's own actions. In Islamic terminology, Muhasaba refers to the spiritual practice of holding oneself accountable for daily words, deeds, and intentions, and seeking correction (Islah) through repentance for mistakes. It is considered a vital means of achieving purification of the soul (Tazkiyah) and attaining the pleasure of Allah.

== Etymology and concept ==
The word Muhasaba is derived from the Arabic root h-s-b (حسب), which relates to counting, calculating, or accounting. In a theological context, it implies a systematic audit of one's spiritual state. It is closely linked to the concept of the "self-reproaching soul" (An-Nafs al-Lawwama) mentioned in the Quran (75:2), which constantly monitors and critiques its own failings.

In Sufism and Islamic ethics (Akhlaq), Muhasaba is the third stage of spiritual struggle (Mujahada), following Musharata (setting conditions for the soul) and Muraqaba (watchfulness or mindfulness). Scholars like Al-Ghazali and Ibn al-Qayyim have emphasized that without regular accounting, the soul becomes prone to negligence (Ghafla) and spiritual decay.

== Key aspects ==
Regular Muhasaba leads an individual to the ultimate stages of spiritual development and helps in abstaining from sins. Its primary aspects include:

- Self-criticism: Verifying whether one's actions align with the Sharia and the principles of sincerity (Ikhlas).
- Remorse for sins: Feeling genuine regret and seeking forgiveness (Tawba) from Allah for mistakes, whether they are major sins or minor lapses in character.
- Expressing gratitude: Offering thanks (Shukr) to Allah for the ability to perform righteous deeds, acknowledging that good actions are a result of divine grace rather than personal merit.
- Future planning: Correcting oneself (Islah) with the aim of improving life in the Hereafter and setting specific goals for spiritual growth.

== Methodology ==
According to Islamic scholars, the method of Muhasaba is analogous to a businessman's accounting. Just as a conscious businessman keeps track of his capital, profit, and loss to ensure the survival of his enterprise, a believer must account for their deeds to ensure spiritual salvation:

1. Capital (Fard and Wajib): Sitting in solitude at the end of the day to check if the obligatory and necessary acts were performed correctly. Any deficiency should be compensated through making up the prayers (Qada) or through voluntary (Nafil) worship.
2. Additional Profit (Nafil): Evaluating whether there was any negligence regarding voluntary acts of worship, such as Dhikr, charity, or extra prayers, which serve to elevate one's rank in the eyes of God.
3. Loss (Sins): Checking if one was involved in any forbidden (Haram) or prohibited acts, including sins of the tongue (lying, backbiting) or heart (envy, pride). If so, immediate repentance (Tawba) and seeking forgiveness (Istighfar) should be performed, followed by good deeds to compensate for the transgression.

Ibn al-Qayyim suggested that Muhasaba should occur twice: once before the action (to check the intention) and once after the action (to check for shortcomings).

== Quran and Sunnah ==
There are instructions regarding the importance of Muhasaba in the primary sources of Islam:

- Al-Quran: Allah says, "O you who have believed, fear Allah. And let every soul look to what it has put forth for tomorrow and fear Allah. Indeed, Allah is Acquainted with what you do." (Surah Al-Hashr, Verse: 18) This verse is considered the foundational evidence for the obligation of self-reflection.
- Al-Hadith: The Messenger of Allah said, "The wise person is the one who takes account of himself and works for what comes after death; and the weak person is the one who follows his own desires and then places his hopes in Allah." (Tirmidhi, Hadith No: 2459)
- Repentance: The Messenger of Allah also said, "(Sometimes) my heart is clouded, and I seek forgiveness from Allah one hundred times a day." (Sahih Muslim, Hadith No: 7033) This highlights that even the most righteous individuals must engage in constant self-audit.

== Examples from the Salaf ==
In Islamic history, the Sahaba and the righteous predecessors (Salaf) practiced Muhasaba with extreme diligence:

- Umar ibn al-Khattab (RA): The second Caliph famously said, "Bring yourselves to account before you are brought to account, and weigh your deeds before they are weighed for you." It is reported that at night, he would strike his feet with a stick and ask himself, "What have you done today?"
- Abu Talha (RA): Once, while praying in a garden, a bird distracted him for a moment. To rectify his perceived lack of focus, he donated that entire portion of the garden as charity in the way of Allah to compensate for the distraction.
- Ahnaf ibn Qays: A famous Tabi'un, he would hold his finger over a lamp's flame until he felt the pain of the heat, then say to himself, "O Hunayf! What prompted you to do what you did on such and such a day?" as a reminder of the punishment of the afterlife.
- Maimun ibn Mahran: He stated, "A pious person is more stringent in accounting for himself than a stingy partner is with his business associate."
