= The Great History =

- Author: Muhammad al-Bukhari
- Original title: al-Tārīkh al-Kabīr
- Language: Arabic
- Genre: Biographical evaluation
- Published: Da'rah al-Ma‘arif al- ‘Uthmaniyyah

The Great History (Arabic: التاريخ الكبير, romanized: al-Tārīkh al-Kabīr) is a book by ninth-century Islamic scholar Muhammad ibn Ismail al-Bukhari in the field of biographical evaluation (ʿilm ar-rijāl).

== Overview ==
Bukhari's Great History focuses on reconstructing the full network of transmitters of hadith, but does not take up an interest in describing the full names or biographies of these transmitters. As such, Bukhari only comments on the reliability of as few as 6% of the hadith reports he mentions and almost never comments on the reliability of transmitters themselves. A typical biographical entry in this work runs as follows:

Ad'ham al-Sadusi, Abui Bishr. Hajjaj al-Aʿwar quoted Shuʿbah, "He was client to Shaqiq ibn Thawr." He heard ʿAbd Allah ibn Buraydah. There related (hadith) from him Shucbah and Hushaym. His hadith is among the Basrans.

According to Firabri, Bukhari composed this text as a young man in Mecca, long before composing his Sahih. Several manuscripts of the text are known from the 9th century, and the tradition is known through the transmission of Abū al-Ḥasan Muḥammad ibn Sahl ibn ʿAbl Allāh, a reciter and grammarian of the Quran from Basra, who is only known for his transmission of his text. Extant manuscripts of this text contain biographies of 12,300 individuals, none of whom are women. While Al-Ḥākim claims that according to Abū ʿAlī al-Husayn al-Māsarjisī, the text contained roughly 40,000 biographical entries of both men and women, Melchert has argued that the evidence consisted of Bukhari having assembled the Great History roughly in the form it exists today, although having undergone some editing and rearrangement.

Some entries in Bukhari's Great History are dedicated to polemicizing against other scholars he is critical of. For example, his entry on the jurist Abu Hanifa claims that he was part of the Murji'ah, a sect al-Bukhari deemed to be heretical. In addition, he asserts that the scholarly community had renounced Abu Hanifa and his "speculative" jurisprudence.

== Reception ==
Bukhari's Great History was quickly received, and it gained fame much earlier than the work that Bukhari is more famous for today, Sahih al-Bukhari. The first mention of someone narrating from the Great History is a century earlier than that of his Sahih, and it becomes used as a model for another biographical work nearly seventy years before another figure uses the Sahih as a template for their hadith collection.

Ibn Abi Hatim wrote the first response to any part of Bukhari's works, specifically by responding to his Great History, though his book was aimed at detecting errors in it. However, he would soon enter a dispute regarding having plagiarized from the Great History. A student replied, however, that Ibn Abi Hatim had considered the work so impressive that he along with his students were using it as the basis of a new work.

Al-Hakim al-Nishapuri used the Great History to support his contention, against other scholars, that many authentic and reliable hadith that had not yet been written down continued to exist and be passed on during his day. Having calculated the number of transmitters in the Great History as roughly 40,000, the number of transmitters among them mentioned in Sahih al-Bukhari as about 2,000, and the number of weak transmitters according to the Kitāb al-ḍuʿafāʾ as about 700, he subtracted both of these numbers from 40,000 and concluded that there was a large reservoir of untapped reliable transmitters (over thirty thousand) that could have continued to transmit reliable hadith.

== Related works ==
Bukhari also authored two other books of history, titled The Medium History (al-Tarikh al-Awsat) and The Small History (al-Tarikh al-Saghir ). The latter is lost.
