= Futuh al-Buldan =

History book by Al-Baladhuri (9th century CE)

- Author: Al-Baladhuri
- Original title: فتوح البلدان
- Language: Arabic
- Subject: Islamic history, Conquests
- Genre: Non-fiction
- Media type: Print (Hardcover & Paperback)

Futūh al-Buldān (Arabic: فتوح البلدان, lit. 'Conquest of (the) countries'), or Kitāb Futūḥ al-Buldān ("Book of the Conquest of the Countries/Lands"), is the best known work by the 9th century Muslim historian Ahmad Ibn Yahya al-Baladhuri of Abbasid-era Baghdad.

Written in Arabic, the Kitāb Futūḥ al-Buldān is a digest of a larger lost work of geographical history of the Caliphate empire, the political histories and events leading to the inclusion of the locations within it, including accounts of the early conquests of the Islamic prophet Muhammad and the early caliphs'.

Al-Baladhuri travelled widely in regions of northern Syria and Mesopotamia, collecting traditions for material to include in his book. He also translated some Persian texts into Arabic.

== Editions ==
Futūḥ al-Buldān was edited by M. J. de Goeje as Liber expugnationis regionum (Leiden, 1870; Cairo, 1901).

An English edition with the title "The Origins of the Islamic State" was published in two parts by Columbia University Press; vol. 1, translated by Philip Khuri Hitti (1916) and vol. 2, translated by Francis Clark Murgotten (1924). Second English edition was published by I.B. Tauris with translation and annotations by Hugh N. Kennedy.
