= Al-Baladhuri =

Abbasid-era Muslim historian (820–892)

Ahmad Ibn Yahya ibn Jabir al-Baladhuri
- أحمد بن يحيى بن جابر البلاذري
- Title: Al-Baladhuri

Personal life
- Died: 892 or 893 Baghdad, Abbasid Caliphate
- Era: Islamic golden age (Abbasid Era)
- Region: Mesopotamia
- Main interest: History
- Notable work(s): Kitab Futuh al-Buldan and Ansab al-Ashraf

Religious life
- Religion: Islam
- Jurisprudence: Sunni

ʾAḥmad ibn Yaḥyā ibn Jābir al-Balādhurī (Arabic: أحمد بن يحيى بن جابر البلاذري; died 892 or 893) was a 9th-century Muslim historian. A West Asian historian, he spent most of his life in Baghdad and was at the court of the caliph al-Mutawakkil. He travelled in Syria and Iraq, compiling information for his major works.

His name is also found in the variant forms Ahmad Bin Yahya Bin Jabir Al-Baladhuri, Balazry Ahmad Bin Yahya Bin Jabir Abul Hasan and Abi al-Hassan Baladhuri.

== Biography ==
Ibn Nadim said Al Baladhuri was Persian. Some scholars have said that he was of Arab descent and he spent most of his life in Baghdad. Baladhuri spoke Persian and translated Middle Persian works to Arabic. Masudi refers to one of his works in which he refutes non-Arab nationalism Shu'ubiyya.

He lived at the court of the caliphs al-Mutawakkil and Al-Musta'in and was tutor to the son of al-Mutazz. He died in 892 as the result of a drug called baladhur (hence his name). (Baladhur is Semecarpus anacardium, known as the "marking nut"; medieval Arabic and Jewish writers describe it as a memory-enhancer).

== Works ==
His chief extant work, a condensation of a longer history, is Kitab Futuh al-Buldan (فتوح البلدان), "Book of the Conquests of Lands", which tells of the 7th-century wars and conquests of the Arabs, and the terms made with the residents of the conquered territories. It covers the conquests of lands from Arabia west to Egypt, North Africa, and Spain, and east to Iraq, Iran, and Sind. An English translation in two volumes by Phillip Hitti (1916) and Francis Clark Murgotten (1924) was published as The Origins of the Islamic State.

Al-Baladhuri's history, in turn, was much used by later writers. Ansab al-Ashraf (أنساب الأشراف, "Lineage of the Nobles"), also extant, is a biographical work in genealogical order devoted to the Arab aristocracy, from Muhammad and his contemporaries to the Umayyad and Abbāsid caliphs. It contains histories of the reigns of rulers.

His discussions of the rise and fall of powerful dynasties provide a political moral. His commentaries on methodology are sparse, other than assertions of accuracy.

== See also ==
- Al-Haytham ibn 'Adi
- List of Islamic scholars
