= Abu Hurayra =

Companion of Muhammad (c. 603–679)

- أبُو هُرَيْرَة

Personal life
- Born: c. 603 Al-Jabur, Arabia (present-day Al Bahah, Saudi Arabia)
- Died: 679 (aged 75–76) Medina, Umayyad Caliphate (present-day Saudi Arabia)
- Resting place: Al-Baqi Cemetery, Medina, Saudi Arabia
- Era: Islamic Medina; Rashidun Caliphate; Umayyad Caliphate
- Main interest: Hadith
- Known for: Narrating the highest number of hadith
- Occupation: Scholar; hadith narrator; governor; soldier
- Relations: Banu Daws clan, Zahran tribe

Religious life
- Religion: Islam

Muslim leader
- Influenced by: Muhammad
- Military career
- Allegiance: Muhammad; Rashidun Caliphate
- Branch: Rashidun army
- Commands: Governor of Bahrain
- Arabic name
- Personal (Ism): ʿAbd al-Raḥmān عَبْد ٱلرَّحْمَٰن
- Patronymic (Nasab): Ibn Ṣakhr ٱبْن صَخْر
- Teknonymic (Kunya): Abū Hurayra أبُو هُرَيْرَة
- Toponymic (Nisba): Al-Dawsī al-Zahrānī ٱلدَّوْسِيّ ٱلزَّهْرَانِيّ

Abū Hurayra ʿAbd al-Raḥmān ibn Ṣakhr al-Dawsī al-Zahrānī (Arabic: أبُو هُرَيْرَة عَبْد ٱلرَّحْمَٰن بْن صَخْر ٱلدَّوْسِيّ ٱلزَّهْرَانِيّ; c. 603–679), commonly known as Abu Hurayra (Arabic: أبُو هُرَيْرَة; lit. 'father of a kitten'), was a companion of the Islamic prophet Muhammad and is considered the most prolific hadith narrator.

Born in al-Jabur in Arabia into the Banu Daws clan of the Zahran tribe, Abu Hurayra was a comparatively late convert to Islam, embracing the faith around 7 AH (c. 629 CE), following the Battle of Khaybar. He migrated to Medina, became a member of the Suffah, and lived in Muhammad's house. Muhammad is said to have recognized his powerful memory and intelligence and to have given him permission to record hadith in both written and oral form.

Under Muhammad, Abu Hurayra was sent as a muezzin to al-Ala ibn al-Hadhrami in Bahrain. During the early Muslim conquests he is said to have refused administrative positions and preferred to live as a private citizen in Medina, although during the reign of the Rashidun caliph Umar (r. 634–644) he briefly served as governor of Bahrain.

Abu Hurayra is said to have memorized more than 5,000 hadiths, while nearly 3,500 traditions have come down from him. These transmissions subsequently produced more than 500,000 narrator chains, and his activity as a transmitter became an important model for later Sunni hadith scholarship. Hadiths transmitted by him have been employed by all four major Sunni madhahib in significant jurisprudential decisions. His reliability has, however, been questioned by some non-Sunni scholars, including some Shia scholars.

== Life ==
=== Ancestry ===
Abu Hurairah's personal name (ism) is unknown, and so is his father's. (Note: While there is uncertainty surrounding Abu Hurairah and his father's personal name, most Islamic scholars including Al-Dhahabi and Ibn Hajar al-Asqalani are of the opinion that Abdurrahman was his personal name, while Sakhr was his father's.) The most popular opinion, voiced by Al-Dhahabi and Ibn Hajar al-Asqalani, is that it was 'Abd al-Raḥmān ibn Ṣakhr (عبد الرحمن بن صخر). According to Al-Dhahabi, Abu Hurairah hailed from the prominent Banu Daws clan of the Arab tribe of Zahran, and was born in the region of Al-Bahah. Ibn Hajar al-Asqalani traced the lineage of the Banu Daws to Azd, a Nabatean ancestor of the southern Arabs, through Zahran. Al-Qalqashandi reported the Zahran as a descendant of Khalid ibn Nasr, while Ibn Hazm reported Zahran was a descendant of Malik ibn Nasr, a Qahtanite. One hadith records Muhammad as having a favorable view of the Banu Daws, viewing them as on par with his tribe, the Quraysh, the Ansar of Medina, and Banu Thaqif.

=== Conversion to Islam and life in Medina ===
Abu Hurairah embraced Islam through Tufayl ibn 'Amr, the chieftain of his tribe in 629, 7AH. Tufayl had returned to his village after meeting Muhammad in Mecca and converting to Islam in its early years. Abu Hurairah was one of the first to accept Islam from his tribe, unlike the majority of Tufayl's tribesmen who embraced Islam later. Abu Hurairah accompanied Tufayl to Madina to meet Muhammad who renamed him Abdurrahman. It was said that he found a stray kitten, so he took it in his sleeve, which is the reason he was named Abu Hurairah (father of the kitten).

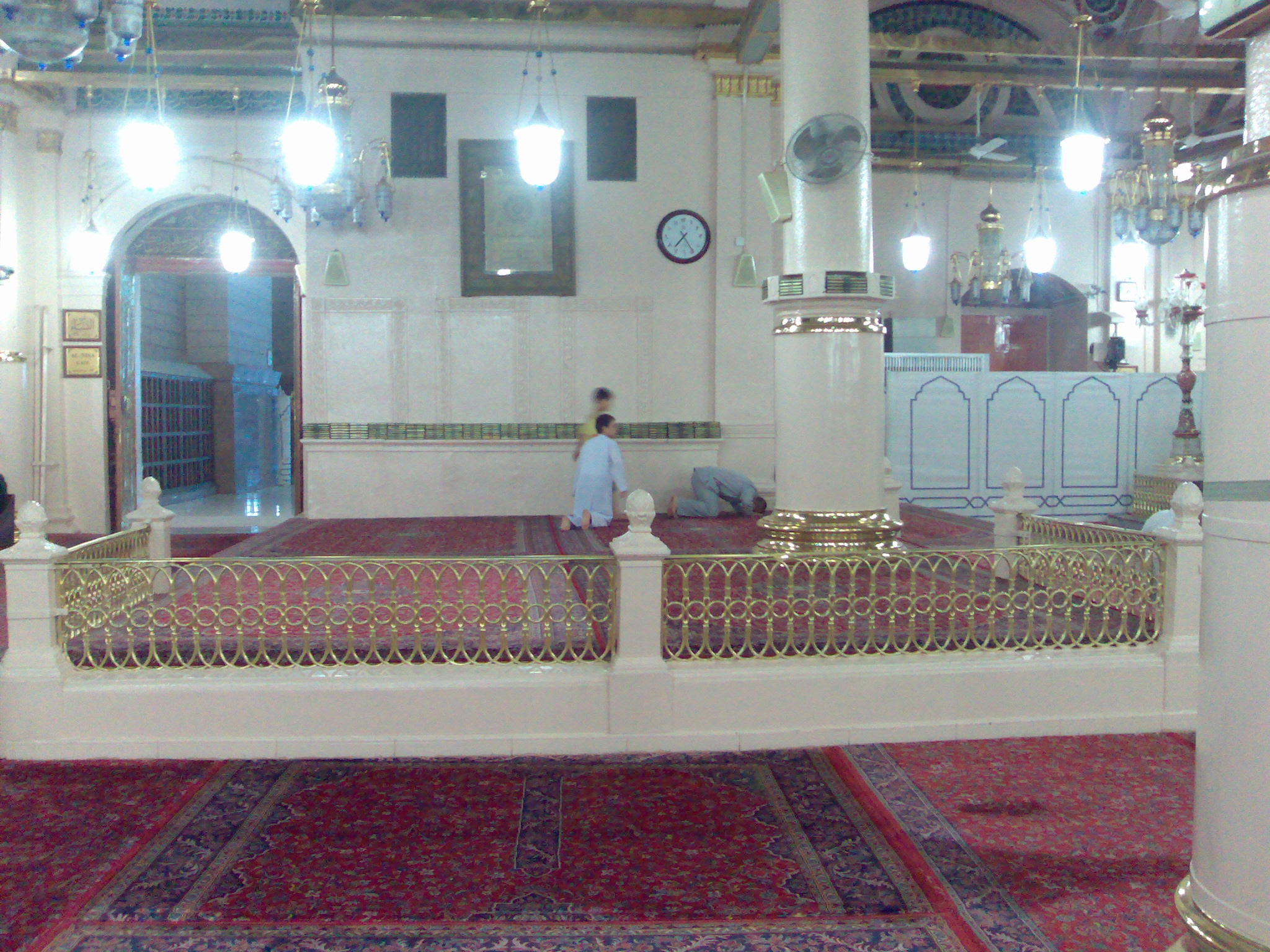
The Dikkat al-Aghawāt, commonly identified with the Suffah

After the hijrah (migration to Medina), Abu Hurairah became one of the inhabitants of the Suffah. Abu Hurairah stuck closely to Muhammad, and went on expeditions and journeys with him. Abu Hurairah was recorded as having participated in the Expedition of Dhat al-Riqa, which took place in Najd in the year 4 AH or 5 AH. The consensus of Muslim scholars considers Abu Hurairah's military career as having begun after the Battle of Khaybar, after which he was present in the Battle of Mu'tah, during the Conquest of Mecca, at Hunayn, and in the Expedition of Tabuk. Later, Abu Hurairah was sent as a muezzin to al-Ala al-Hadhrami in Bahrayn.

Abu Hurairah was father-in-law of the prominent tabi' (pl. tabi'un) Said ibn al-Musayyib (d. 715), who confessed that he had married Abu Hurairah's daughter in order to get closer with her father and learn the hadith he possessed. Hammam ibn Munabbih (d. 748), another prominent tabi' and disciple of Abu Hurairah compiled the hadith narrated to him by Abu Hurairah in his hadith collection Sahifah Hammam ibn Munabbih, one of the earliest hadith collections in history. There is little mention of the family of Abu Huraira, but it is known that he had a wife named Basra bint Ghazwan.

=== After Muhammad, later years and death ===
According to Ahmad ibn Hanbal, after the death of Muhammad, Abu Hurairah participated in the Ridda Wars under the first Rashidun caliph, Abu Bakr. After Abu Bakr's death, during Umar's reign, Abu Hurairah actively participated in the Muslim conquest of Persia. Later, he became governor of Bahrayn. During this time, Abu Hurairah is noted to have become wealthy, amassing close to 10,000 gold dinars through breeding horses and spoils of war, which he brought to Medina. This raised Umar's suspicion, who accused him of corruption. Abu Hurairah was later found innocent and Umar asked him again to govern Bahrayn once again, an offer he turned down. After leaving the governorship, Abu Hurairah returned to Medina and worked as a qadi (judge), issuing fatāwā (sing. fatwa). Abu Hurairah was one of the defenders of the third Rashidun caliph, Uthman, during his assassination. Abu Hurairah continued to work as mufti after Uthman's death. In the early Umayyad era, Abu Hurairah was tasked with assessing the authenticity of the hadith circulated within the caliphate.

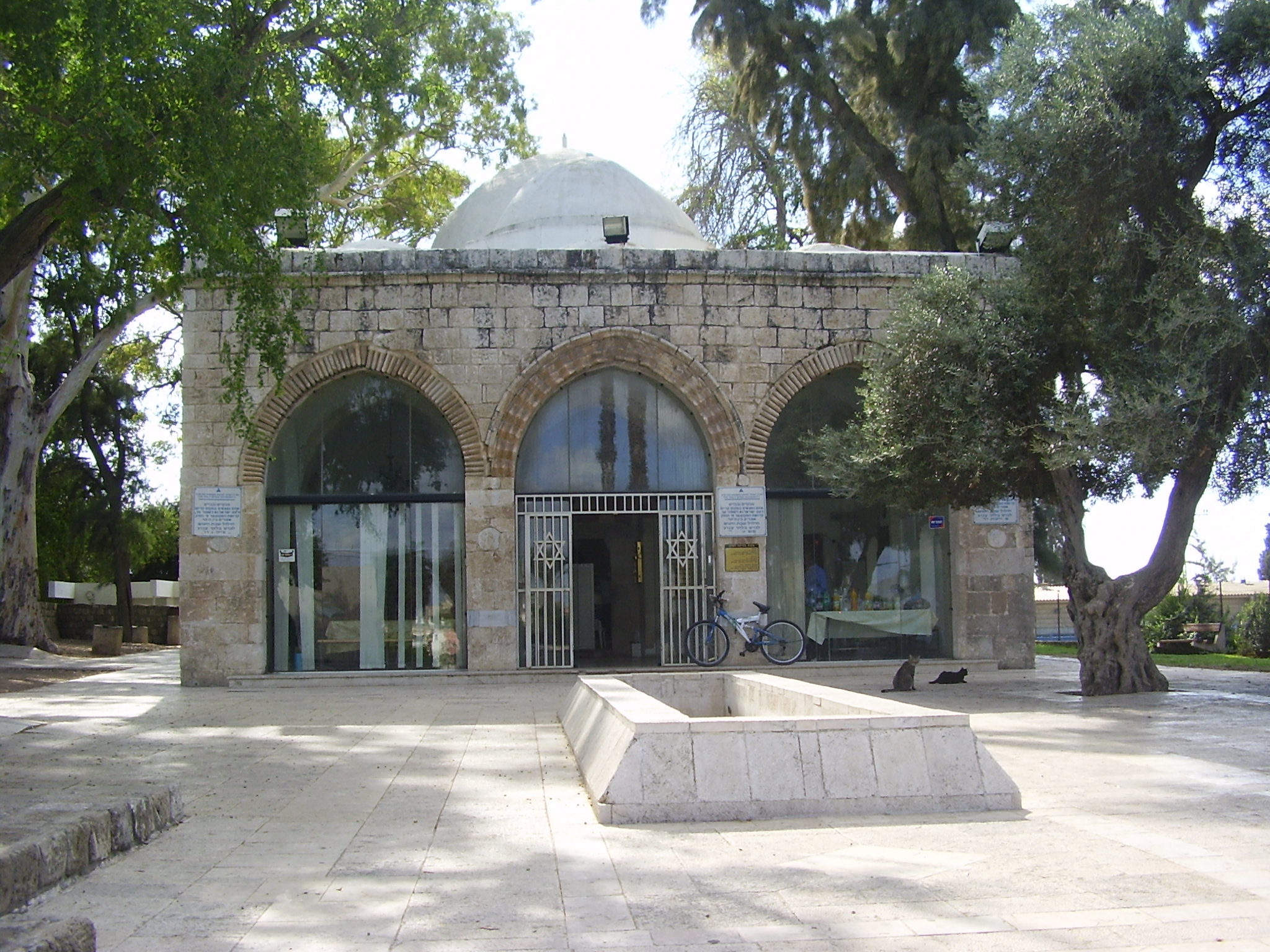
The Mausoleum of Abu Hurairah in the HaSanhedrin Park in Yavne

Abu Hurairah died in the year 679 (59 AH) at the age of 76 and was buried at al-Baqi'. His funeral prayer was led by Al-Walid ibn Utba, who was the governor of Medina, and was attended by Abd Allah ibn Umar and Abu Sa'id al Khudri. Al-Walid wrote to Mu'awiya I about his death, who made a concession of 10,000 dirhams to Abu Hurairah's heirs and commanded Al-Walid to take care of them. In 1274 (673 AH) the Mausoleum of Abu Hurairah was constructed in Yibna, at the order of the Mamluk Sultan Baibars. The mausoleum has been described as "one of the finest domed mausoleums in Palestine." Following the 1948 Arab–Israeli War, the mausoleum was designated a shrine for Jews dedicated to Gamaliel II by the Israeli government, although neither Abu Hurairah nor Gamaliel II are likely to have been buried in the tomb.

== Legacy and influence ==
The hadith reported by Abu Hurairah are diverse, being used by Islamic scholars specializing in hadith, 'aqīdah, fiqh (Islamic jurisprudence), ijtihād, tafsīr (Quranic exegesis), and Islamic eschatology.

In his Kitab al-Iman, a book on 'aqīdah, Ibn Taymiyyah (d. 1328) uses hadith narrations from Abu Hurairah to study tawḥīd. Ibn Kathir uses Abu Hurairah's narrations in Al-Nihāyah fī al-Fitan wa al-Malaḥim, a work on Islamic eschatology. References to Abu Hurairah's narrations can be found in Al-Tabari's Tafsir al-Tabari, Ibn Kathir's Tafsir Ibn Kathir, Al-Mahalli and al-Suyuti's collaborative Tafsir al-Jalalayn, and Al-Qurtubi's Tafsir al-Qurtubi, all of which are works of tafsīr, or Quranic exegesis. They also refer to Abu Hurairah's ijtihād and the resulting fatāwā as their resources.

Abu Hurairah was among the few companions of Muhammad who issued jurisprudential rulings or fatāwā (sing. fatwa), and he was personally requested by his contemporary companion Ibn Abbas to do so. As the Sunni madhahib (sing. madhhab, schools of jurisprudence) were structurally based on the rulings or narrations from companions of Muhammad, the ruling jurisprudence for the four main Sunni madhahib heavily relied on Abu Hurairah's fatāwā and his numerous narrations. Taqi al-Din al-Subki compiled the fatāwā of Abu Hurairah in his book, Fatawa Abu Hurairah. Abu Hurairah was one of the six prominent companions of Muhammad involved in jurisprudential rulings during the Rashidun era, the others being Ali, Sa'd ibn Abi Waqqas, Abu Darda, Saʽid al-Khudri, and Abu Shafiah. Abd al-Rahman Jaziri, a professor at Al-Azhar University, has concluded that on certain issues, the four madhahib reached ijmā' (consensus) on Abu Hurairah's ruling.

The four major Sunni madhahib, have all used hadith narrated by Abu Hurairah in major jurisprudential decisions. Muwatta Imam Malik, the hadith collection of the founder of the Maliki madhhab, Malik ibn Anas, contains various hadiths narrated by Abu Hurairah wherein they form the basis for jurisprudential rulings. Bulugh al-Maram, a hadith collection by Ibn Hajar al-Asqalani pertaining to the Shafi'i madhhab also contains many hadith narrated by Abu Hurairah. Al-Nawawi's Al-Arba'ūn an-Nawawiyyah also contain narrations from Abu Hurairah. According to Muhammad ibn al-Uthaymeen in his commentary of Al-Nawawi's Riyāḍ as-Ṣaliḥīn, Abu Hurairah's ijtihad formed the basis for Al-Nawawi's rulings of wudu.

Bilal Philips, a Salafi preacher from Canada who was known for his preaching activity to three thousand US army veteran of the first Gulf War after the successful victory of Saudi-US coalition, also listed several quotations from Abu Hurairah in his earlier work, Salvation Through of Repentance , regarding various matters of Islamic teaching, included Qadr Night and Friday prayers.

Meanwhile, Ministry of Religious Affairs (Indonesia) and Indonesian Ulema Council has issued a ruling for the cleansing protocol to manage COVID-19 pandemic Muslim victims dead bodies based on the fatwa verdict of Abu Hurairah when managing dead bodies of plague victims. The same council worked together with Ministry of Health to issue joint formal decrees of the obligation for Hajj pilgrims to undergo Meningitis vaccination, on the basis of their ruling from Hadith of Abu Hurairah.

Saleh al-Fawzan, Grand Mufti of Saudi Arabia and one of its most senior scholars has listed most of his thoughts regarding Fiqh jurisprudence based on hadiths narrated by Abu Hurairah.

=== Hadith ===
Abu Hurairah is credited with narrating at least 5,374 hadith. Abu Hurairah continued collecting hadith after the death of Muhammad from Abu Bakr, Umar, Aisha, Fadl ibn Abbas, Usama ibn Zayd, Ubayy ibn Ka'b, and Ka'b al-Ahbar. It is said by Abu Hurairah himself the only one who surpassed him regarding hadith were Abd Allah ibn Amr ibn al-As, another companion who serve as writer assistant of Muhammad and author of "Al-Sahifah al-Sadiqah", the first Hadith book in history. However, according to his own admission, Abu Hurairah said that Abd Allah ibn Amr ibn al-As possessed a greater number of narrations than himself, since Abd Allah diligently wrote every hadith he heard, while Abu Hurairah relied on his extraordinary memory.

Muhammad Sa'id Mursi recorded around 800 companions of Muhammad and tabi'un who learnt hadith from Abu Hurairah. According to the records from Ibn Hajar and ad-Dhahabi, Abu Hurairah fellow Sahabah and Tabi'un who narrated hadiths from him were Abd Allah ibn Umar ibn al-Khattab, Ibn Abbas, Jabir ibn Abd Allah, Anas ibn Malik, Said ibn al-Musayyib, Urwah ibn Zubayr, Amr ibn Dinar, Ibn Sirin, Ata ibn Abi Rabah, Isa ibn Talha al-Taymi, Hammam ibn Munabbih, Hasan al-Basri, Tawus ibn Kaysan, Qasim ibn Muhammad ibn Abi Bakr, among others.

==== Abu Hurairah's narrative chains ====
According to Ali Ahmad as-Salus, Abu Hurairah possessed more asnād (sing. sanad, Arabic: سَنَد, lit. 'chain') than Ibn Abbas, Aisha, Abd Allah ibn Umar, and Abdullah ibn Masud. According to Al-Dhahabi, the healthiest and most authentic asnād of narrators beginning at Abu Hurairah were:

- Abu Hurairah → Ibn Sirin → Ayyub al-Sakhtiani
- Abu Hurairah → Ibn Sirin → Abd Allah ibn Awn
- Abu Hurairah → Abdul Rahman bin Hormuz → Abdullah ibn Dhakwan
- Abu Hurairah → Said ibn al-Musayyib → Ibn Shihab al-Zuhri

According to Al-Khatib al-Baghdadi, Ali ibn al-Madini (d. 849) considered the most authentic chain that begin with Abu Hurairah as being Abu Hurairah → Ibn Sirin → Ayyub al-Sakhtiani → Hammad ibn Zaid.

According to Ahmad Muhammad Shakir (d. 1958), a hadith scholar from Al-Azhar University, the most authentic asnād that came from Abu Hurayrah were:

- Abu Hurairah → Said ibn al-Musayyib → Ibn Shihab al-Zuhri → Malik ibn Anas
- Abu Hurairah → Said ibn al-Musayyib → Ibn Shihab al-Zuhri → Ma'mar ibn Rashid
- Abu Hurairah → Said ibn al-Musayyib → Ibn Shihab al-Zuhri → Sufyan ibn ʽUyaynah
- Abu Hurairah → Ibn Sirin → Ayyub al-Sakhtiani → Hammad ibn Zaid
- Abu Hurairah → Ubaidah ibn Sufyan al Hadhrami → Ismail ibn Al-Hakim
- Abu Hurairah → Hammam ibn Munabbih → Ma'mar ibn Rashid

According to Al-Albani in his book, Silsalat al-Hadith ad-Da'ifah, the madhhab of Abu Hurairah was taken as a guideline for hadith scholars to evaluate the validity of a hadith.

=== Criticism ===
The reliability of Abu Hurayra as a hadith narrator has been a subject of debate among certain Islamic sects and modern scholars. Several Shia scholars, such as Ja'far al-Iskafi, have historically regarded Abu Hurayra as unreliable, questioning the authenticity of his narrations. In the modern era, Egyptian writer Mahmud Abu Rayyah (d. 1970) raised significant doubts about Abu Hurayra in his book Aḍwā alā al-sunna al-Muhammadiyya (Illuminations on the Sunnah of Muḥammad). Critics often point to the vast volume of hadiths attributed to him despite his relatively short period of companionship with Muhammad (approximately three years). Furthermore, academics like Abdullah Saeed note that writers such as Abu Rayyah cite traditions where Caliph Umar is said to have threatened Abu Hurayra with serious consequences due to his frequent narrations.

In contrast, the Sunni scholarly community, both classical and modern, universally regards Abu Hurayra as highly trustworthy. Traditional Sunni scholars, such as Al-Dhahabi and Ibn Hajar al-Asqalani, attribute his prolific output to his constant companionship with Muhammad as a member of the Suffah, his dedicated focus on memorization, and his longevity, which allowed him to transmit traditions long after other prominent companions had passed away. Sunni scholars generally dismiss criticisms of Abu Hurayra's reliability, arguing that the entire generation of the Sahabah is considered upright and exempt from the strict biographical evaluation (Jarh wa Ta'dil) applied to later narrators.

Sunni academics and traditionalists have also extensively rebutted modern critics like Abu Rayyah. Scholars such as Mustafa al-Siba'i, Abdur-Rahman al-Mu'allimee al-Yamani and Shu'ayb al-Arna'ut argue that modern critics often rely on weak reports, biased interpretations, or the methodologies of Western orientalists like Ignác Goldziher, rather than classical Islamic hadith sciences. Furthermore, Sunni scholars dispute the narratives of Umar threatening Abu Hurayra, pointing out that Umar later entrusted Abu Hurayra with the governorship of Bahrayn and judicial duties in Medina, which they argue demonstrates the Caliph's continued trust in him.

== See also ==
- List of battles of Muhammad
- List of Sahabah

== Bibliography ==
- Philips, Bilal (1990). The Evolution of Fiqh. International Islamic Publishing House. pp. 44–45, 103–104, 114–117. ISBN 81-7231-355-1.
- Tarmizi, Erwandi (2017). Haram Wealth in Contemporary Muamalah (MBA). PT Erwandi Tarmizi Konsultan. p. 125. ISBN 9786021974209.
