= Wahb ibn Munabbih =

7th/8th-century Yemeni Muslim scholar

- وهب بن منبه
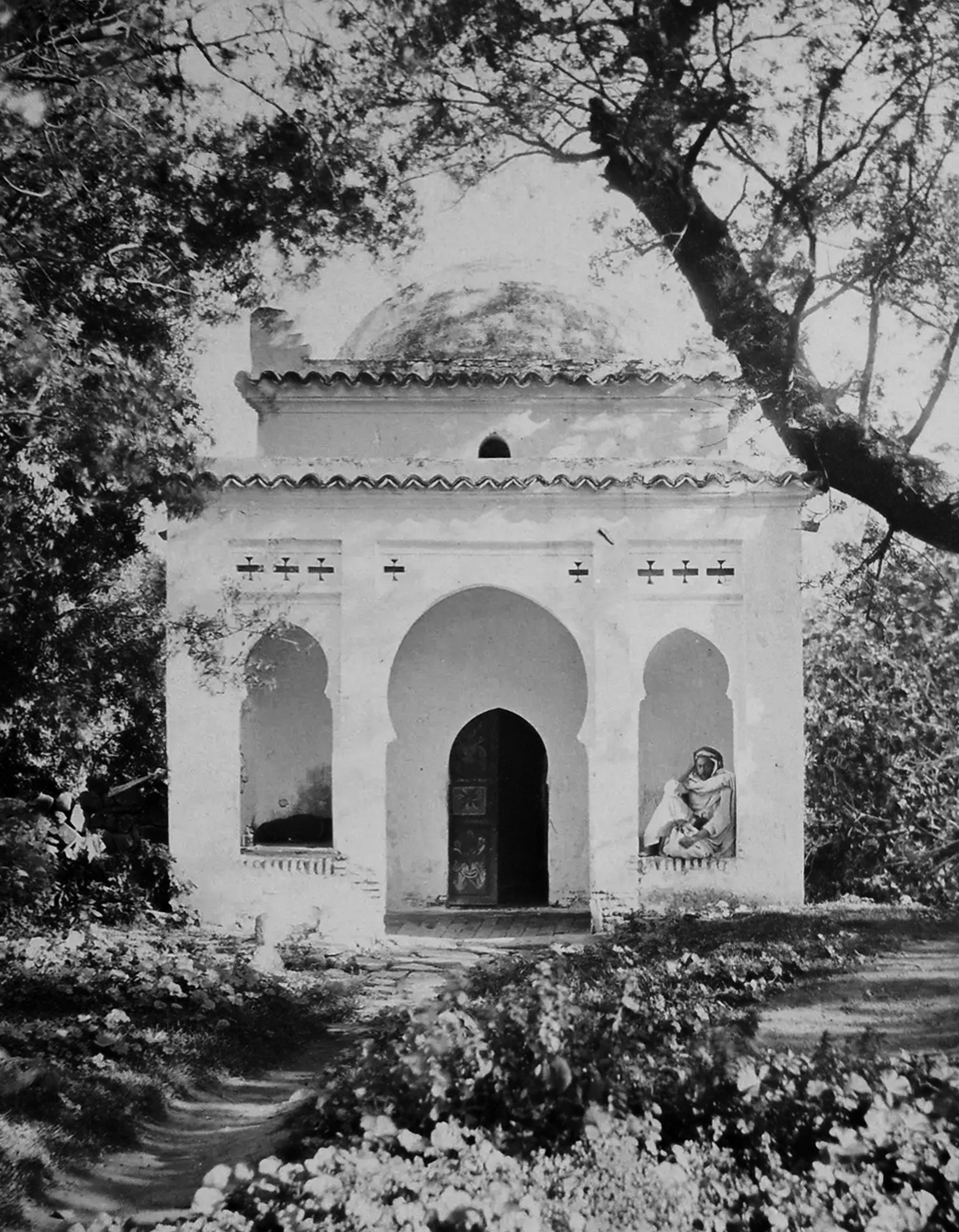
- Mausoleum of "Sidi Wahb" in Tlemcen, Algeria, sometimes falsely attributed to Wahb ibn Munabbih

Personal life
- Born: 34 AH / 654–655 CE Dhamar, Yemen, Rashidun Caliphate
- Died: 110 AH / 728–729 CE or 114 AH / 732–733 CE (aged 72–74 or 76–78) Yemen, Umayyad Caliphate
- Cause of death: Flogging
- Home town: Dhamar
- Children: Bin Wahb bin Munbah, 'Abdullah bin Wahb
- Parent: Munabbih ibn Kamil (father)
- Era: Umayyad period
- Main interest(s): Israʼiliyyat, Qisas al-Anbiya, Sīrah, Hadith, Tafsir
- Notable works: Kitāb al-Mubtada' wa Qiṣaṣ al-Anbiyā'; Maghāzī Rasūl Allāh; Ḥadīth Dāwūd
- Relatives: Hammam ibn Munabbih (Elder Brother)

Religious life
- Religion: Islam
- Profession: Judge

Muslim leader
- Teacher: Abu Hurayra, Abd Allah ibn Amr ibn al-As, Ibn Abbas, Jabir ibn Abd Allah, Ibn Umar, Abu Sa'īd al-Khūdrī, Anas ibn Malik, Hammam ibn Munabbih
- Students: Amr ibn Dinar
- Influenced by: Abd Allah ibn Salam, Ka'b al-Ahbar
- Arabic name
- Personal (Ism): Wahb وهب
- Patronymic (Nasab): ibn Munabbih ibn Kāmil ibn Sayj ibn Sayḥān بن منبه بن كامل بن سيج بن سيحان
- Teknonymic (Kunya): Abū ʿAbd Allāh أَبُو عَبْدِ ٱللّٰه
- Toponymic (Nisba): al-Ṣanʿānī al-Yamanī ٱلصَّنْعَانِيّ ٱلْيَمَنِيّ

Wahb ibn Munabbih ibn Kāmil ibn Sayj ibn Sayḥān (Arabic: وهب بن منبه بن كامل بن سيج بن سيحان), commonly known as Wahb ibn Munabbih, was a Yemeni traditionist, Muslim scholar, historian and judge of Persian descent, renowned for his ascetic lifestyle and for transmitting Judaeo-Christian traditions in early Islam. He is widely recognized for his contributions to ''isrā'īliyyāt'' and as one of the earliest collectors of prophetic Sīrah and pre-Islamic Arabian lore.

== Biography ==
=== Early life and background ===
Wahb was known by his kunya, Abū 'Abd Allāh. He was born in 34 AH / 654–655 CE in Dhamar, a town near Sanaa in Yemen. Of Persian origin, his father was a Companion of the Prophet, described as a Persian knight who had been expelled from Herat during the reign of Khosrow I (r. 531–579). His mother was Himyarite. Wahb had four brothers: Hammām, Ghaylān, 'Aqīl, and Ma'qil. He is reported to have traveled frequently to Herat.

Wahb is said to have inherited religious knowledge from early Jewish converts to Islam, particularly Kaʿb al-Aḥbār and ʿAbd Allāh ibn Salām.

=== Judicial career ===
Wahb served as a qāḍī (judge) in Sanaa during the governorship of ʿUrwa ibn Muḥammad. On one occasion, in response to public grievances, he beat an official ('āmil) with a stick until he drew blood.

Wahb also reportedly knew the ancient Himyaritic language. Al-Mas'ūdī recounts that the Umayyad caliph al-Walīd I (r. 705–715) once sent him an inscription discovered in Damascus to decipher.

=== Imprisonment and death ===
Later in life, Wahb was imprisoned and flogged by the Umayyad governor of Yemen, Yūsuf ibn ʿUmar al-Thaqafī. The reason for this punishment is unknown, though R.G. Khoury suggests it may have been related to Wahb's theological views or his associations with the People of the Book. He reportedly died as a result of the flogging. His death is dated variously to 110 AH / 728–729 CE or 114 AH / 732–733 CE.

== Doctrinal views ==
Wahb is said to have initially support Qadarite views, advocating the doctrine of qadar (free will). He later renounced this position, considering it incompatible with divine revelation. He is reported to have authored a treatise titled Kitāb al-Qadar, which he subsequently regretted and, according to some reports, even denied having written.

== Works ==
Wahb's reputation as a transmitter of biblical, historical, and moral narratives led to numerous works being attributed to him. While the extent of his direct authorship is uncertain, his legacy was preserved by students and family, especially his grandson 'Abd al-Mun'im ibn Idrīs.

- Kitāb al-Mubtada' wa Qiṣaṣ al-Anbiyā' (كتاب المبتدأ وقصص الأنبياء)

A foundational narrative containing the beginning of creation and encompasses the history of the prophets, from Adam to the arrival of the Prophet of Islam. It is frequently cited by Al-Tabari, Ibn Qutayba, and others. Currently, it only survives partially in a papyrus dated 229 AH / 844 CE, which is now housed in the University of Heidelberg’s collection (Heidelberg, UB, Papyrus Arab 23).

- Kitāb al-Mulūk al-Mutawwadjīn min Ḥimyar (كتاب الملوك المتوجين من حمير)

A historical-legendary work written by Wahb that narrates the legends, genealogies, poetry, burial sites, and exploits of the crowned kings of the ancient Yemeni kingdom of Ḥimyar. Although it has not survived, substantial portions of its content are preserved in Ibn Hisham's Kitāb al-Tījān fī Mulūk Ḥimyar, where Wahb is cited as the principal authority, primarily through the transmission of his grandson and the traditionist Asad ibn Mūsā. The opening chapters, in which Wahb is the exclusive source, contains genealogical and chronological detail linking the biblical world to the Yemeni past. In the latter sections of it, the presence of Wahb as a cited authority diminishes significantly, eventually disappearing altogether. This shift suggests that the earliest parts of the book, rich in genealogical and biblical content, relied heavily on Wahb, while the later parts drew from other sources or traditions. The Tījān is notable for its strongly biblical tone, echoing the worldview and narrative style of the Isrā'īliyyāt.

- Maghāzī Rasūl Allāh (مغازي رسول الله)

Wahb wrote one of the earliest Sīrah books, Maghāzī Rasūl Allāh, a narrative containing Sirah military campaigns. Currently, the only surviving portion is a papyrus fragment written in 228 AH / 842 CE preserved in Schott-Reinhardt collection, founded by Carl Becker and first published by R.G. Khoury in 1972 along with a German translation. Despite Wahb's influence on biblical-Isrā'īliyyāt material, his contributions in the Islamic field were notably neglected by Medinan scholars, particularly by Ibn Isḥāq, possibly due to Wahb's marginal status outside the Medinan hadith schools. The surviving maghāzī material includes early Islamic events including the conversion of Zurāra ibn As'ad and his son As'ad ibn Zurara, the pledge at al-'Aqabah, the Quraysh council at Dār al-Nadwa, the Hijrah to Medina, and Ali's campaign against the tribe of Khath'am. A few additional reports on the Prophet's life are also attributed to him, albeit sparsely.

- Kitāb al-Isrā'īliyyāt (كتاب الإسرائيليات)

A compendium of Israelite stories, attributed to Wahb. Though there is no attestion of it in the first century of Islam and is likely posthumous. Many of these stories were incorporated by a Jewish compiler into the Arabian Nights.

- Kitāb Zabūr Dāwūd (كتاب زبور داود)

An Islamicized adaptation of the Psalms of David, popularizing its moral themes. Rather than a direct translation, it popularized Davidic wisdom in a format resonant with early Islamic spirituality.

- Ḥikmat Wahb, Ḥikmat Luqmān, and Maw'iẓat Wahb (حكمة وهب ,حكمة لقمان ,موعظة وهب)

Collections or titles associated with Wahb's wisdom literature, drawing on Judeo-Christian and Islamic traditions. These works containing ḥikam (wisdom) and mawā'iẓ (admonitions) attributed to David and Luqmān. Many of them are cited by Abū Bakr Muḥammad ibn Khayr with a complete isnād (Chain) tracing back to Wahb's nephew.

- Kitāb al-Qadar (كتاب القدر)

A theological treatise later written on Qadar by Wahb. This may be the first ever book written in Qadar. He later retracted his position on Qadariyah. He regretted writing this book and according to Abu Nu'aym al-Isfahani, he even denied writing it.

Futūḥ al-Khulafā' / Ta'rīkh al-Khulafā' (فتوح الخلفاء / تاريخ الخلفاء)

Chronicles of the early caliphs attributed to him by Kâtip Çelebi, through there is no evidence of its existence.

- Tafsīr Wahb (تفسير وهب)

A Qur'anic exegesis attributed to him by Kâtip Çelebi, through there is no evidence of its existence.

- Ḥadīth Dāwūd (حديث داود)

A historical work called Ḥadīt̲h̲ Dāwūd ('The History of David'). Currently, only a papyrus survives written in 229 AH / 843 CE in Heidelberg which is badly damaged by age and insects. It was first published by R.G. Khoury in 1972 along with a German translation. It was almost completely restored using a parallel version of the text in Kitāb Bad' al-Khalq wa Qiṣaṣ al-Anbiyā' by Umara ibn Wathima (d. 289 AH / 901-2CE) who made a copy of this work and also of others from a more or less original version by Wahb, transmitted by his grandson Idrīs b. Sinān, and by his son 'Abd al-Mun'im b. Idrīs (d. 288 AH / 842 CE). Although, only the second part is preserved, from Moses to the arrival of the Prophet of Islam.

== Reception ==
Although Muslims generally regarded him as a reliable authority in his accounts, some of them, such as Ibn Khaldun, declared that in his other writings he simply lied.

== See also ==
- Wahb (name)
- Hammam ibn Munabbih
- Munabbih ibn Kamil
- Israʼiliyyat
- Ka'b al-Ahbar
- Abd Allah ibn Salam

=== Bibliography ===
- Jawad Ali (2019). Sejarah Arab Sebelum Islam–Buku 4: Kondisi Sosial - Budaya [Arab History Before Islam–Book 4: Social - Cultural Conditions] (in Indonesian). Pustaka Alvabet. ISBN 9786232200616.
