= Religious significance of Jerusalem =

Religious ties to a specific geography

The city of Jerusalem is sacred to many religious traditions, including the Abrahamic religions of Judaism, Christianity and Islam which consider it a holy city. Some of the most sacred places for each of these religions are found in Jerusalem, including the Temple Mount/Haram Al-Sharif and the Church of the Holy Sepulchre.

== In Judaism ==
Jerusalem has been the holiest city in Judaism and the spiritual land of the Jewish people since the 10th century BC. During classical antiquity, Jerusalem was considered the center of the world, where God resided.

The city of Jerusalem is given special status in Jewish religious law. In particular, Jews outside Jerusalem pray facing its direction, and the maaser sheni, revai and First Fruits must be eaten in Jerusalem. Any expansion of the city for these purposes must be approved by the Sanhedrin. When the Temple in Jerusalem was standing, Jerusalem also observed special laws regarding the Four Species on Sukkot, and the Shofar on Rosh Hashanah.

And God said: "Take now thy son, thine only son, whom thou lovest, Isaac, and go to the land of Moriah [Jerusalem]; and offer him there for a burnt-offering upon one of the mountains [Temple Mount] which I will tell thee of."

— Genesis 22:2

Jerusalem has long been embedded into Jewish religious consciousness. Jews have studied and personalized the struggle by King David to capture Jerusalem and his desire to build the Jewish temple there, as described in the Book of Samuel and the Book of Psalms. Many of King David's yearnings about Jerusalem have been adapted into popular prayers and songs.

Jerusalem appears in the Tanakh (Hebrew Bible) 669 times and Zion (a symbolic mention of Jerusalem and sometimes of the Land of Israel as a whole) appears 154 times. The first section, the Torah, only mentions Moriah, the mountain range believed to be the location of the binding of Isaac and the Temple Mount in Jerusalem, and in later parts of the Tanakh the city is written explicitly. The Tanakh (or Old Testament), is a text sacred to both Judaism and Christianity. In Judaism it is considered the Written Law, the basis for the Oral Law (Mishnah, Talmud and Shulkhan Arukh) studied, practiced and treasured by Jews and Judaism for three millennia. The Talmud elaborates in great depth the Jewish connection with the city.

According to the Hebrew Bible, the First Temple, at the site known as the Temple Mount today, was built by King Solomon and finished in 930 BC, and Mount Moriah is where Abraham almost sacrificed his son and talked to God. When the Babylonians captured the city in 587/6 BC, they destroyed the temple and sent the Jews into exile; as all worshiping was practiced in the temple and only the temple, from the time of Babylonian capture, Judaism was codified. The Tanakh (Old Testament) laid the foundation for both Christianity and Islam.

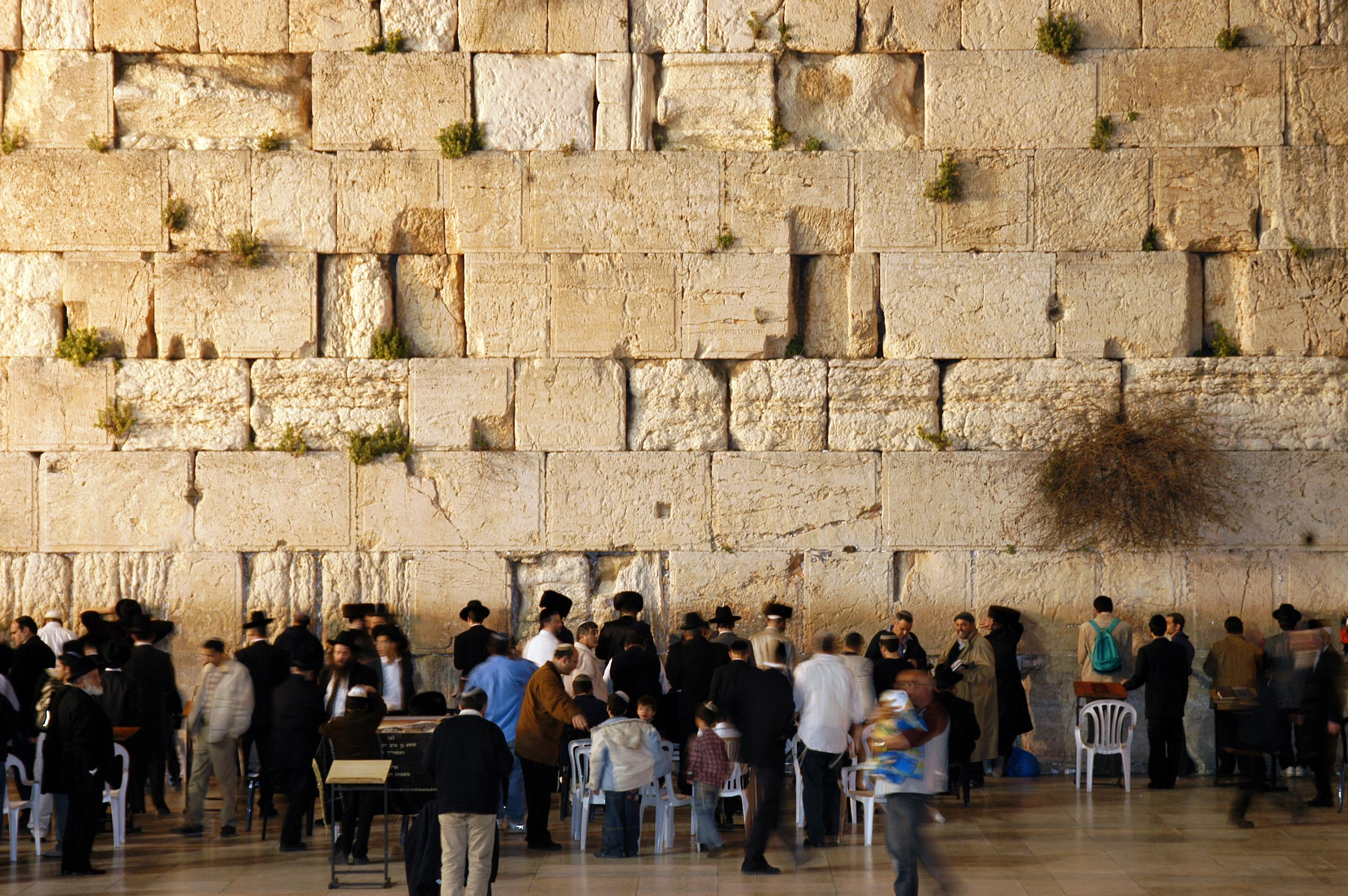
Jews worship at the Western Wall

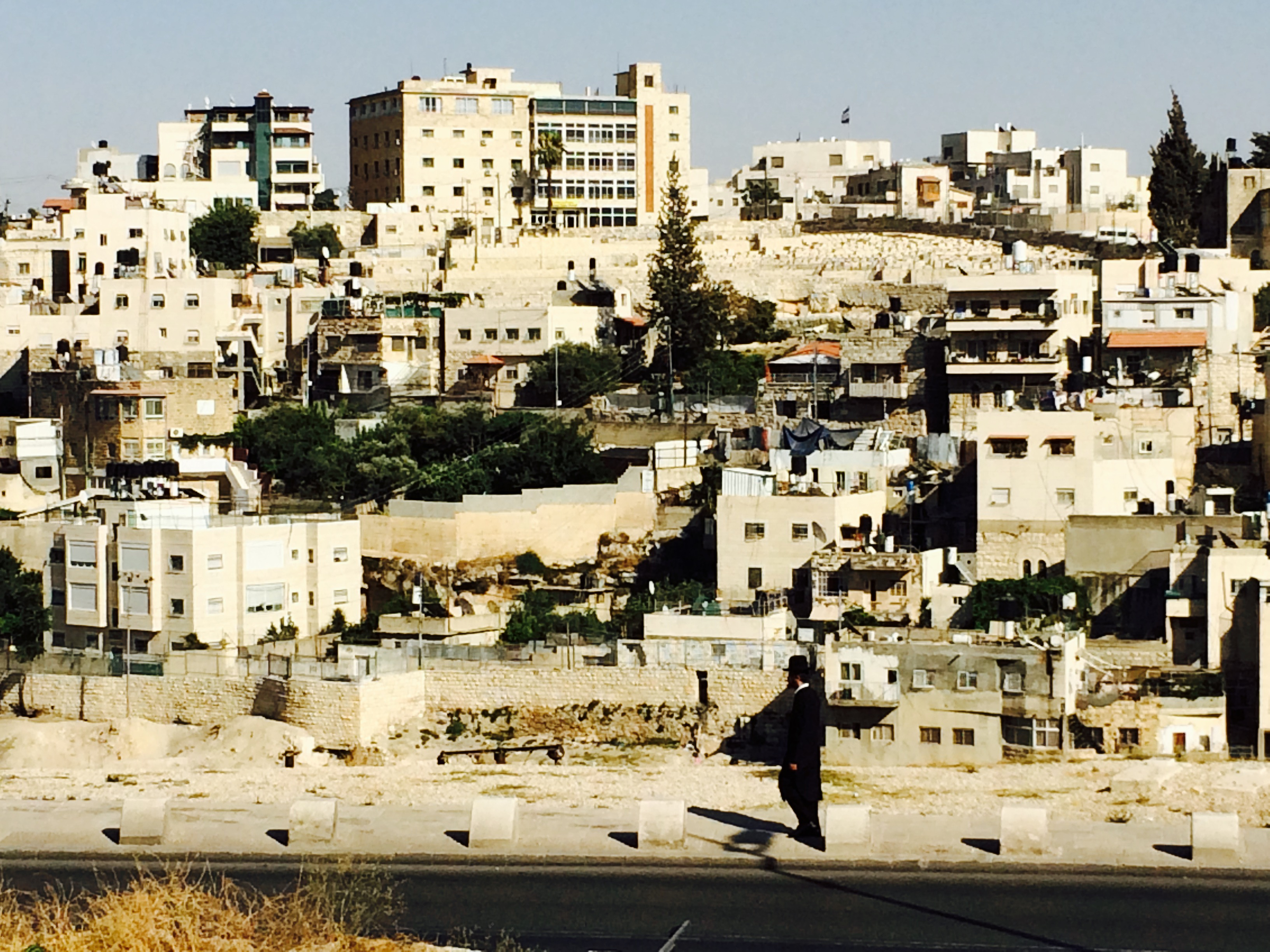
Member of the ultra-Orthodox Jewish community walking in front of Silwan. Many members of the ultra-Orthodox community travel to and live in Jerusalem

== In Christianity ==
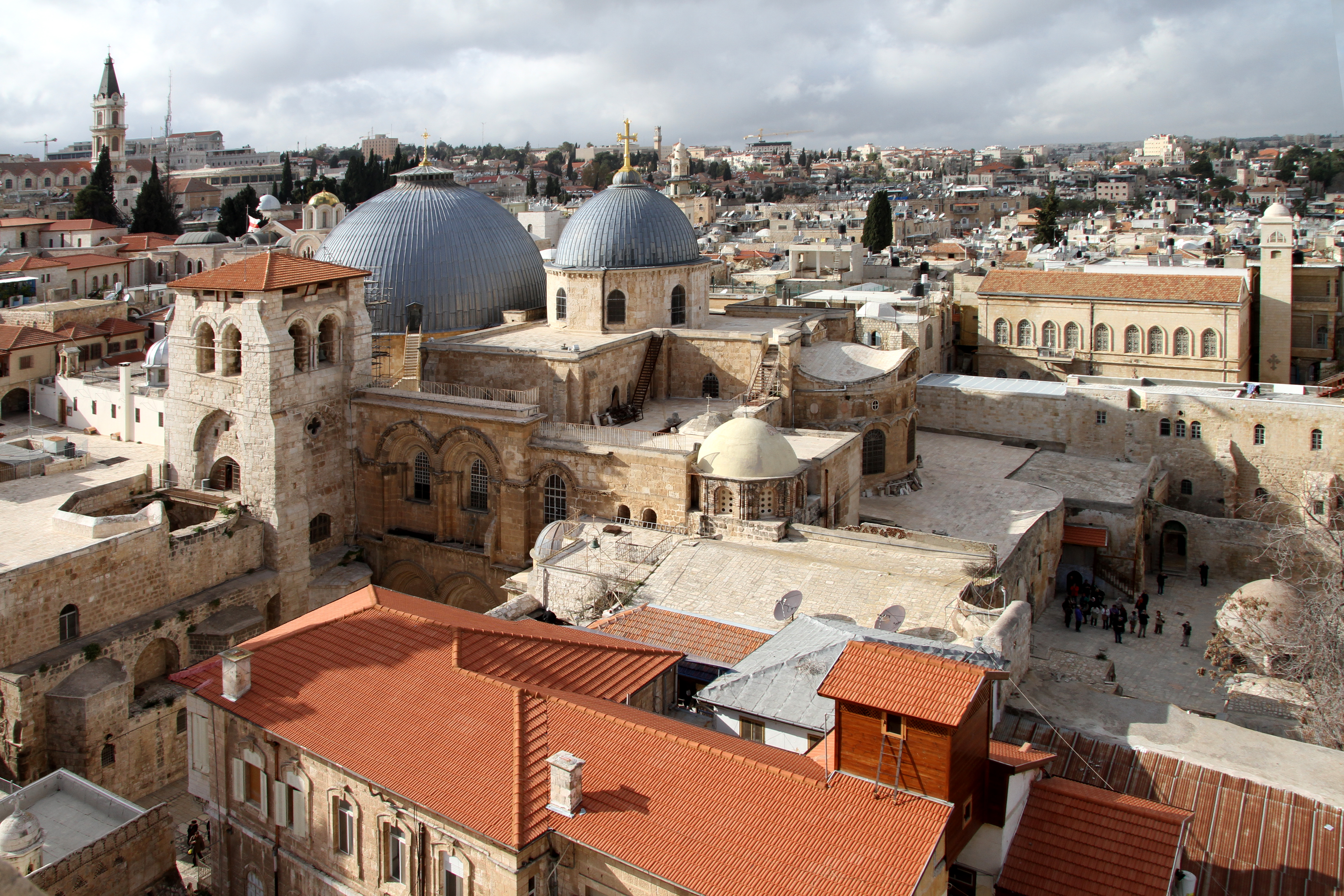
Church of the Holy Sepulchre: Jerusalem is generally considered the cradle of Christianity.

In Christianity, Jerusalem's place in the life of Jesus gives it great importance, in addition to its place in the Old Testament. Jerusalem is the place where Jesus was brought as a child, to be "presented" at the Temple (Luke 2:22) and to attend festivals (Luke 2:41). According to the gospels, Jesus preached and healed in Jerusalem, especially in the Temple courts. There is also an account of Jesus' "cleansing" of the Temple, chasing various traders out of the sacred precincts (Mark 11:15). At the end of each of the gospels, there are accounts of Jesus' Last Supper in an "upper room" in Jerusalem, his arrest in Gethsemane, his trial, his crucifixion at Golgotha, his burial nearby and his resurrection and ascension. Jerusalem is generally considered the cradle of Christianity.

The earliest Christians were outcast and used the Ichthys fish symbol as a way to know if someone was Christian. This would prevent prosecution or death from the Romans. Christianity became more popular over time, but made a huge expansion when the Roman Emperor Constantine claimed Christianity as his religion and thus the religion of the Roman Empire. Jerusalem is mostly important to Christianity because it is where Jesus was brought occasionally as a child, preached to the poor in his adult life, crucified at the end of his life, and resurrected by God. The Church of the Holy Sepulchre is said to have been built over the location where Jesus was crucified and where the tomb was buried. The Church of the Holy Sepulchre is generally considered the most important church in Christendom.

In Christianity, the Jewish connection with the city is considered as the account of God's relationship with his chosen people—the original covenant—and the essential prelude to the events narrated in the New Testament, including both universal commandments (e.g. the Ten Commandments) and obsolete or Judaism-specific ones. In medieval times, Christians thought Jerusalem was the center of the world (Latin: umbilicus mundi, Greek: omphalos), and was so represented in the so-called T and O maps. Byzantine hymns speak of the Cross being "planted in the center of the earth," and the imagery is tied to the concept of the Death and resurrection of Jesus being for the benefit of all mankind. Medieval maps of Europe usually placed the east ("orient")—Jerusalem—at the top, and this arrangement led to the use of the term "to orient" to mean to align a map with actual compass directions.

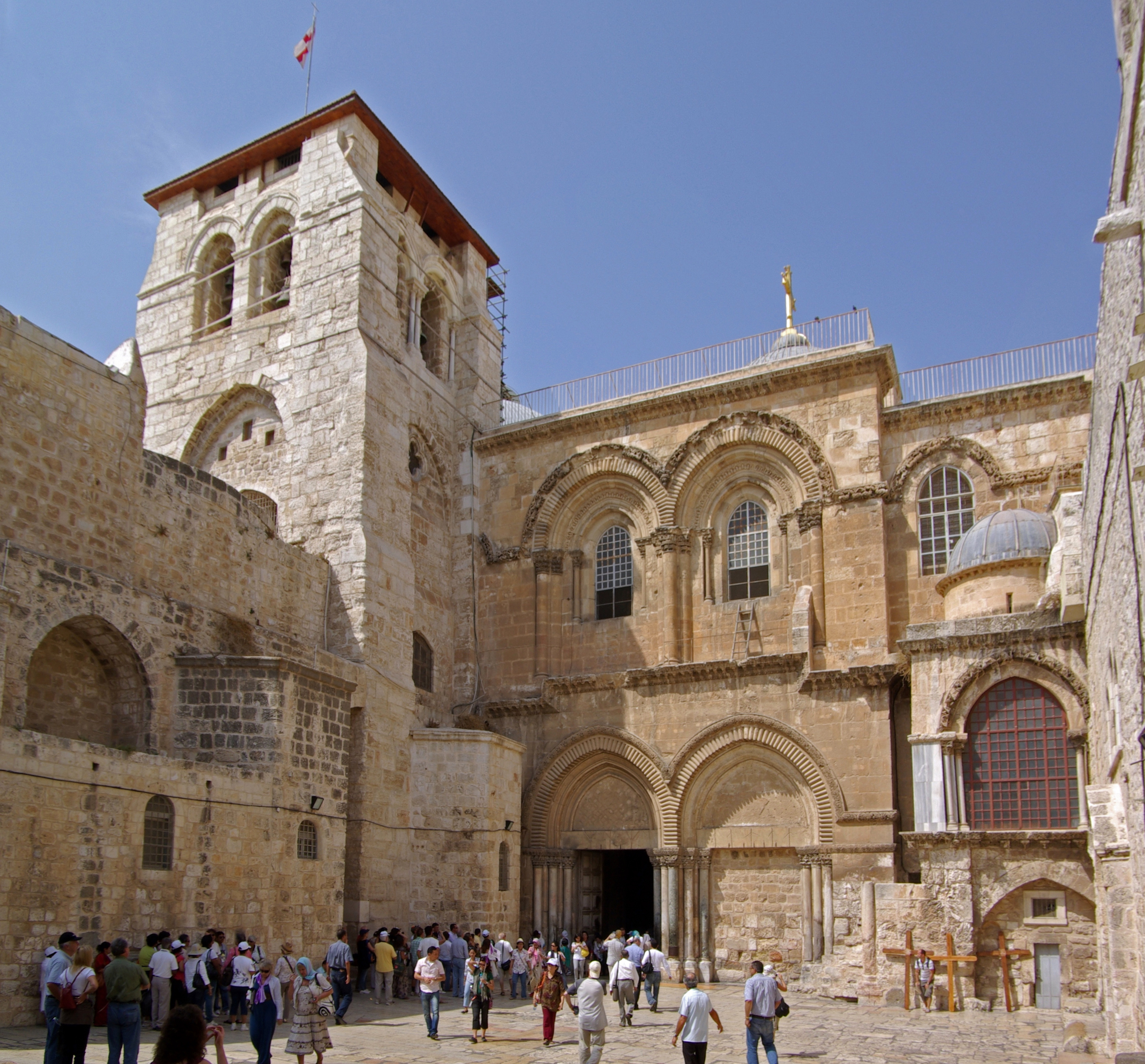
Main entrance to the Church of the Holy Sepulchre; the church is generally considered the most important church in Christendom.

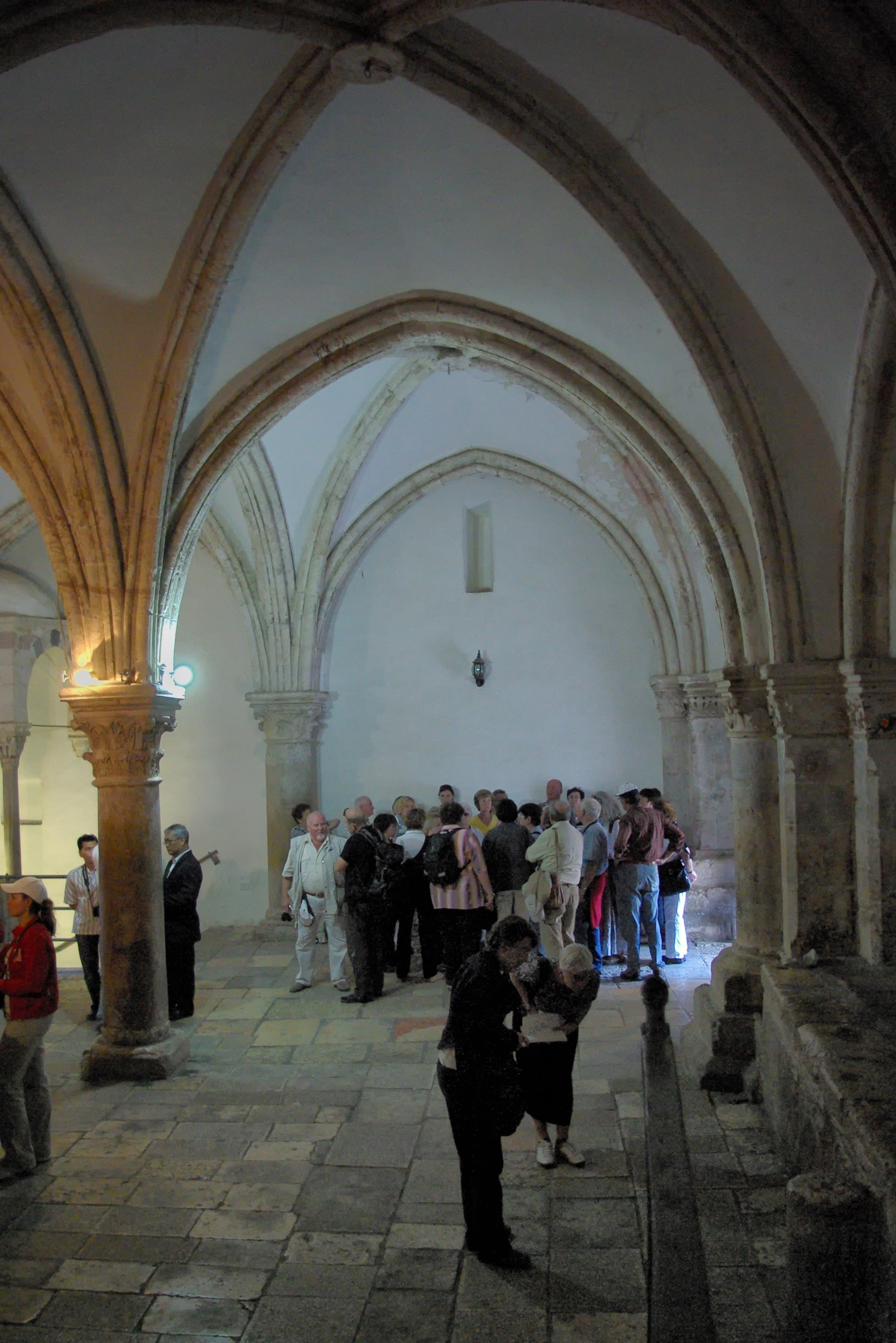
The Cenacle on Mount Zion, claimed to be the location of the Last Supper and Pentecost. Bargil Pixner claims the original Church of the Apostles is located under the current structure.

== In Islam ==
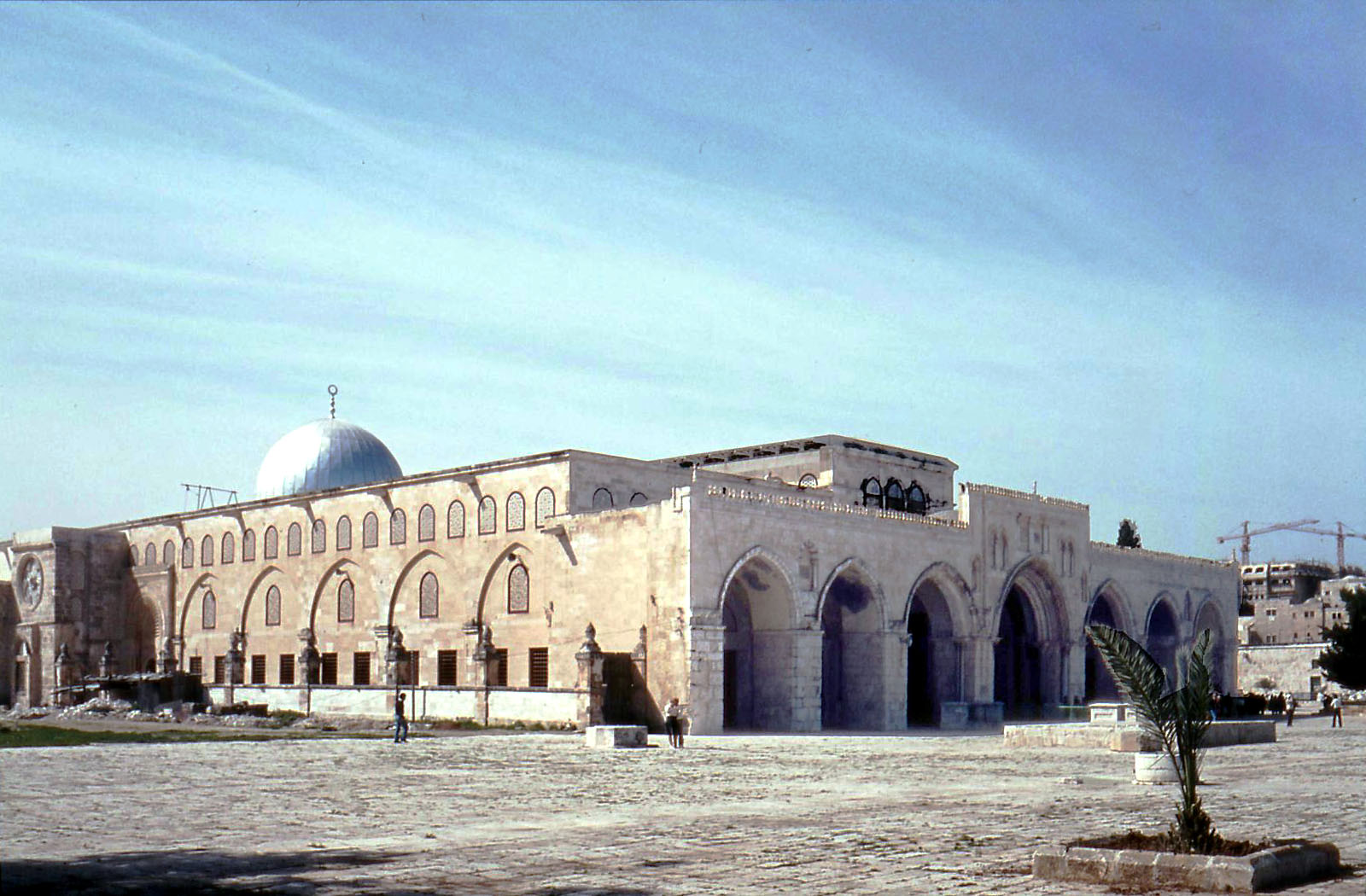
Al-Aqsa Mosque

In Sunni Islam, Jerusalem is the third-holiest city after Mecca and Medina. Muslims believe that Muhammad was transported to Jerusalem during his Night Journey. The Qur'an describes how the prophet was taken by the miraculous steed Buraq from the Great Mosque of Mecca to Al-Aqsa ("the farthest place of prayer") where he prayed, and then to visit heaven in a single night in the year 621.

Glory be to the One Who took His servant ˹Muḥammad˺ by night from the Sacred Mosque to the Farthest Mosque whose surroundings We have blessed, so that We may show him some of Our signs. Indeed, He alone is the All-Hearing, All-Seeing.

— Quran 17:1

Although the city of Jerusalem is not mentioned by any of its names in the Qur'an, it is mentioned in later Islamic literature as the place of Muhammad's Night Journey. The story of Muhammad's ascension from Al-Aqsa Mosque was understood as relating to the Temple in Jerusalem (referred to as Bayt Al-Maqdis). The Al-Aqsa Mosque is specified of being in Jerusalem in numerous hadith (prophetic traditions):

When the people of Quraish did not believe me (i.e. the story of my Night Journey), I stood up in Al-Hijr and Allah displayed Jerusalem in front of me, and I began describing it to them while I was looking at it.

— Sahih al-Bukhari 3886

The most holy spot [al-quds] on earth is Syria; the most holy spot in Syria is Palestine; the most holy spot in Palestine is Jerusalem [Bayt al-maqdis]; the most holy spot in Jerusalem is the Mountain; the most holy spot in Jerusalem is the place of worship [al-masjid], and the most holy spot in the place of worship is the Dome

— Thawr ibn Yazid, c. 770

Zayd ibn Thabit reports that the Prophet said, "How blessed is al-Sham! The Companions around asked: "Why is that?" The Messenger replied, "I see the angels of Allah spread their wings over al-Sham". lbn Abbas added, "and the Prophets lived in it. There is not a single inch in al-Quds (Jerusalem) where a Prophet has not prayed or an angel not stood".

— Tirmidhi hadith (compiled between 864/5-884)

The spiritual importance of Jerusalem in Islam is further emphasized due to its status as the first Qibla (direction of prayer). Islamic tradition holds that Muhammad led prayers towards Jerusalem until the 16th or 17th month after his migration from Mecca to Medina, when Allah directed him to instead turn towards the Kaaba in Mecca.^{[Quran 2:142-151]} Another part of Jerusalem's significance and holiness to Muslims derives from its strong association with Abraham, David, Solomon, and Jesus. They are all regarded as Prophets of Islam and their stories are mentioned in the Qur'an.

Today, the Temple Mount is dominated by three monumental structures from the early Umayyad period – the Dome of the Rock (691 CE), the Dome of the Chain (691–692 CE) and the al-Aqsa Mosque (705–715 CE).

== In Mandaeism ==
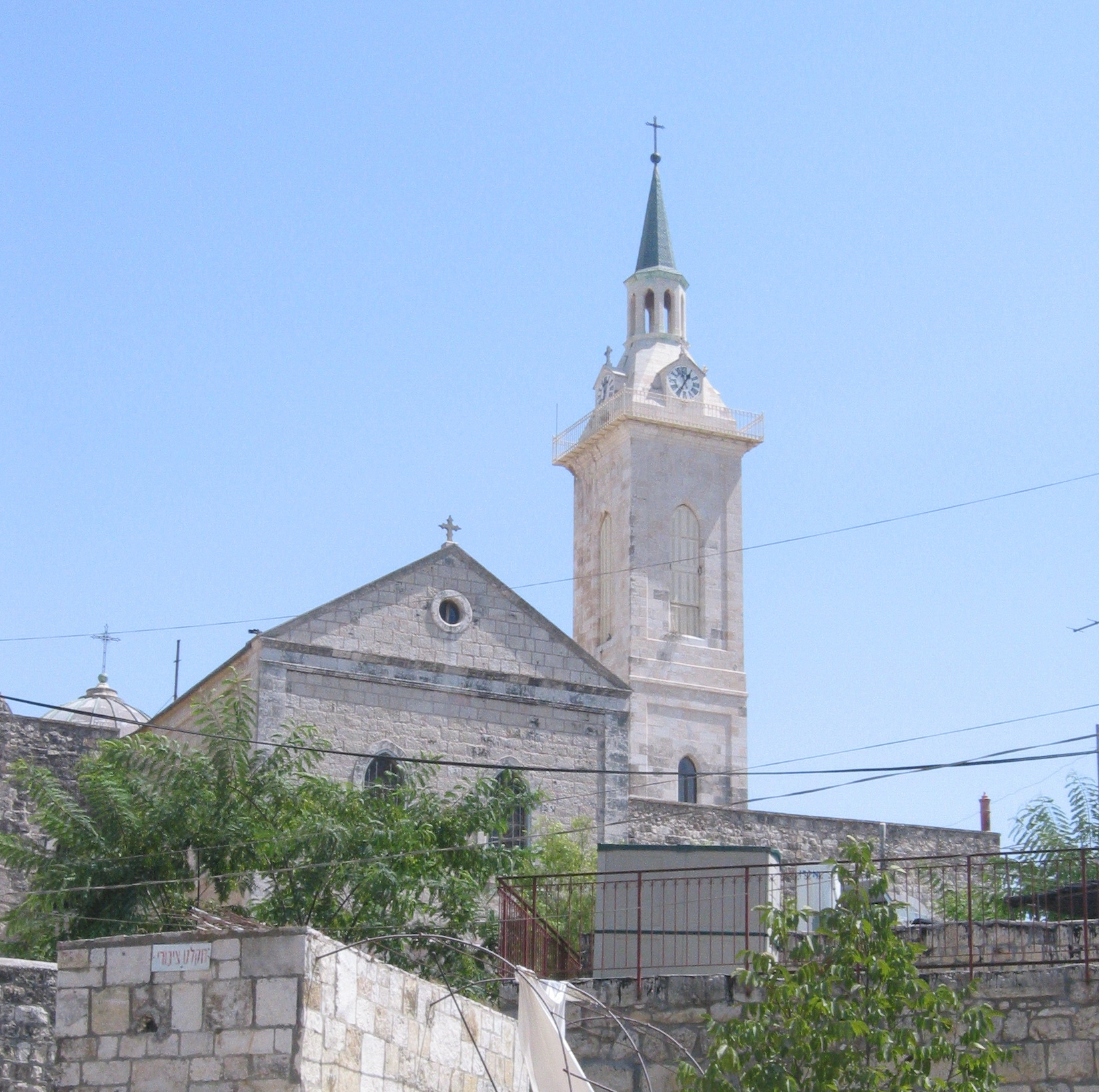
Church of Saint John the Baptist, Ein Kerem, Jerusalem

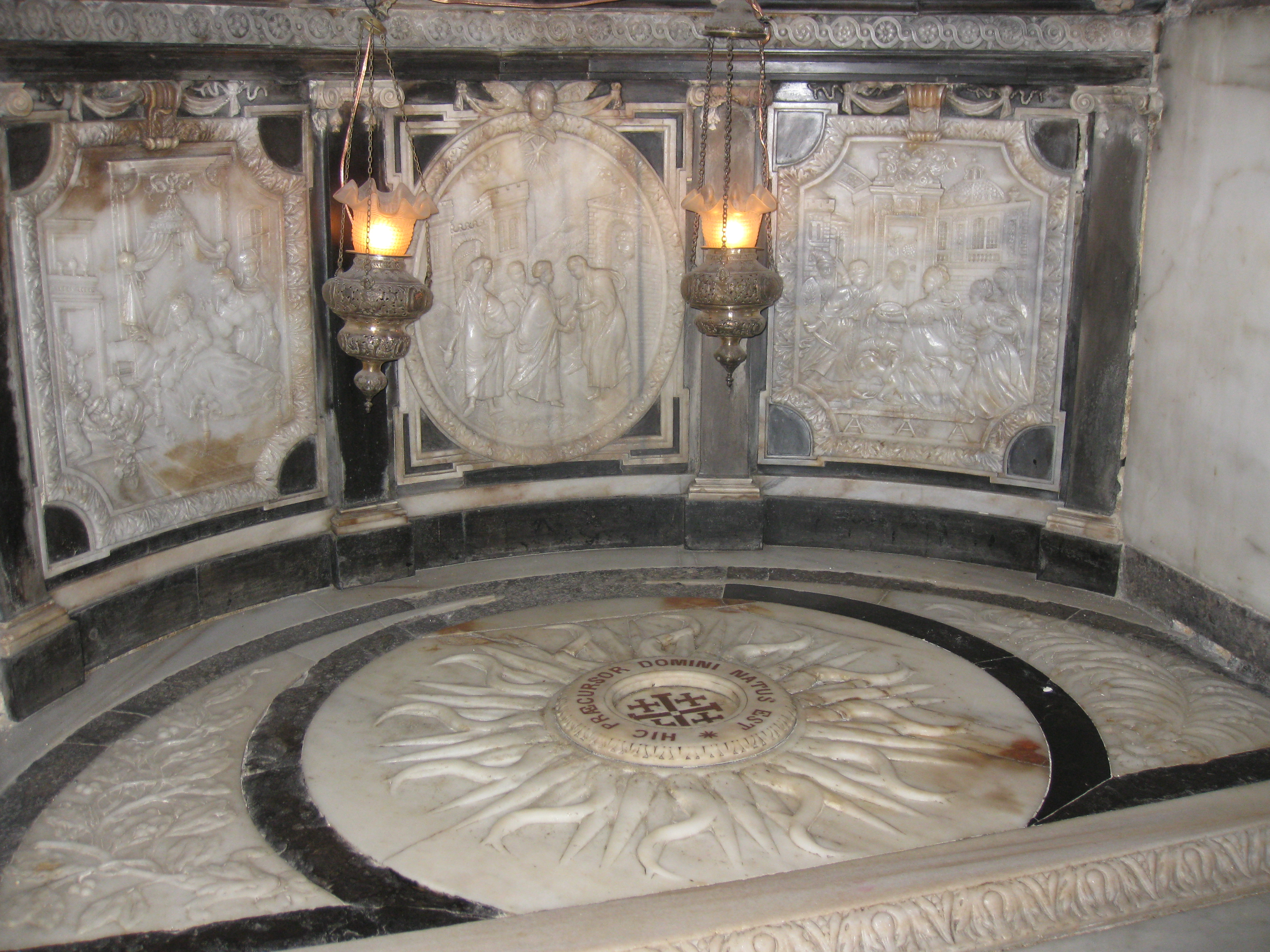
Traditional spot of John the Baptist's birth, inside Church of Saint John the Baptist, Ein Kerem, Jerusalem

According to Jorunn J. Buckley, Mandaeans see themselves to be former Judeans based in Jerusalem and she believes Mandaeism to be of Judean or Israelite origin. Mandaeans believe their chief prophet, John the Baptist, was born in Jerusalem. According to the Haran Gawaita, the Mandaeans loved the Lord Adonai until the birth of Jesus and had to flee Jerusalem due to persecution in the 1st century CE.

James F. McGrath counts 45 mentions of Jerusalem in the Ginza Rabba and 84 in the Mandaean Book of John, noting that this is a higher frequency of mentions per page than the 274 mentions in the longer Babylonian Talmud. Accounts about Jerusalem mention John the Baptist, Miriai, Jacob and Benjamin, and visits by the uthras Anush Uthra and Hibil Ziwa. McGrath notes that the accounts of the destruction of Jerusalem in the Right Ginza portray it as justice for the persecution of Mandaeans, and suggests this to be evidence for a coherent proto-Mandaean community in Jerusalem prior to its destruction. This is similar to the Christian account that viewed the destruction of Jerusalem as vengeance for the persecution of Jesus and his followers. McGrath also adds that no other city in Mandaean literature is given as much attention as Jerusalem.

== See also ==
- Religious significance of the Syrian region
- Holy Land
- Timeline of Jerusalem
- Temple Denial
