= Al-Bidaya wa l-Nihaya =

World history book based on Islamic themes

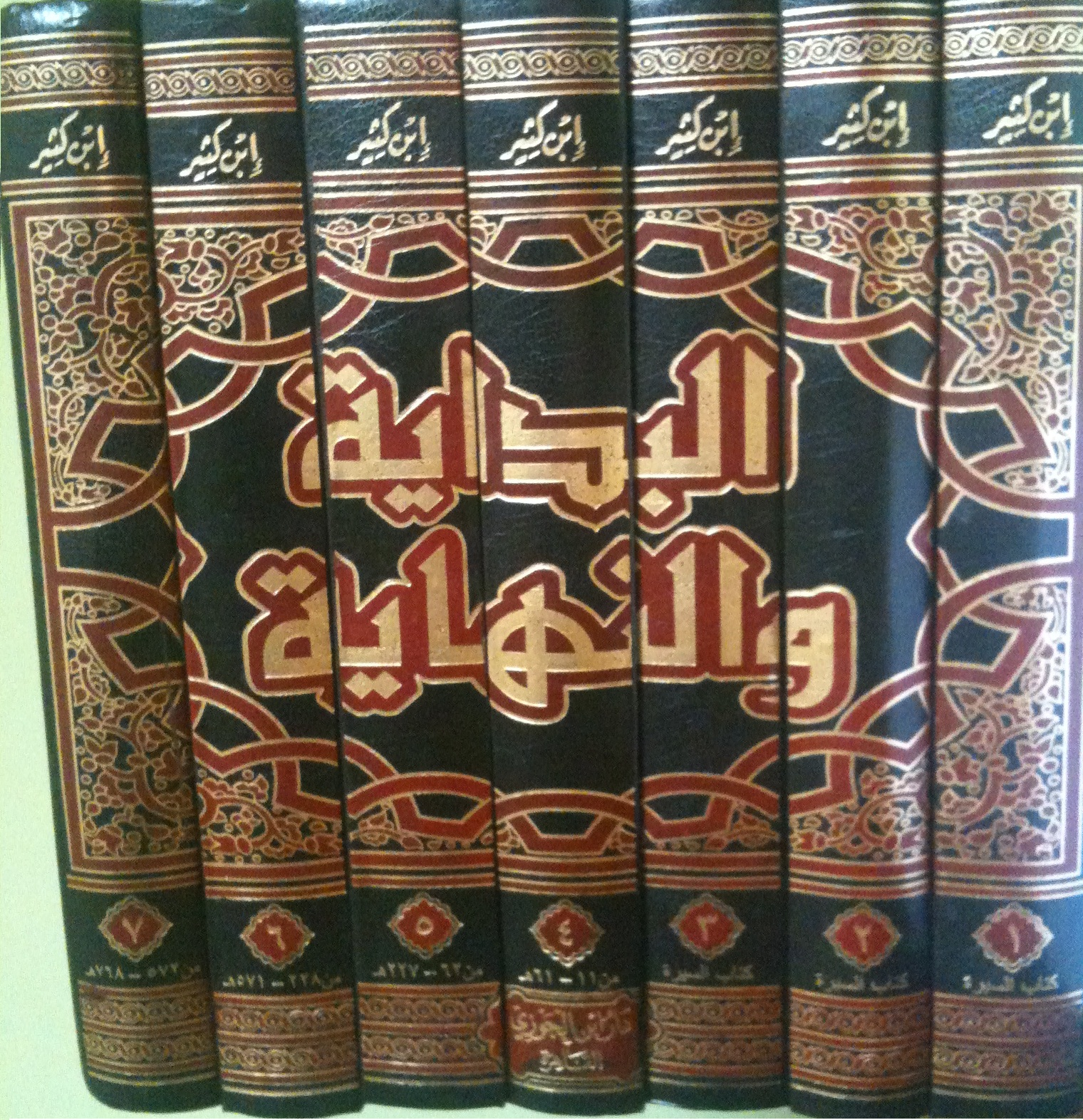
- Cover photo of al-Bidaya wa-l-Nihaya
- Author: Ibn Kathir
- Language: Arabic
- Genre: Islamic History
- Publication date: 14th century (original),
- Publication place: Mamluk Sultanate
- Pages: 10125 pages (14 volumes)
- ISBN: 978-9953520841

Al-Bidāya wa l-Nihāya (Arabic: البداية والنهاية, The Beginning and the End), sometimes also known as the Tārīkh Ibn Kathīr, is a work on Islamic history by the Sunni Muslim scholar Ibn Kathir (d. 1373).

== Overview ==
The different volumes of the book cover the beginning of creation and the sending of humankind to Earth, the lives of the prophets, and the lives of the companions of Muhammad. The final volume records predictions of future events, including the signs of the Day of Judgment, such as the appearance of al-Mahdi and the return of Jesus (ʿĪsā). It also discusses the Qiyama, when, according to Islamic belief, people will enter Jannah (heaven) or Jahannam (hell).

== See also ==
- List of Sunni books
- Tafsir Ibn Kathir
- al‑Sira al‑Nabawiyya
