= Israʼiliyyat =

Narratives assumed to be foreign or from the Israelites in Islamic hadith literature

ʾIsrāʾīliyyāt (Arabic: إسرائيليات, lit. 'Israelite traditions') is a sub-genre of Tafsīr and Ḥadīth which supplements Quranic narratives. Isra'iliyyat may derive from Judaic sources. In the early years, Isra'iliyyat were widely accepted. Only by the time of Ibn Taymiyyah and Ibn Kathīr, the term Isra'iliyyat began to denote content considered dubious or as un-Islamic. In modern times, Turkish commentators of the Qur'an still allow for usage of Isra'iliyyat, while they are rejected by half of the Arab commentators.

The Qiṣaṣ al-Anbiyāʾ (Arabic: قِصَص الْأَنـۢبِيَاء, lit. 'Stories of the Prophets') usually contain the same materials, but avoided criticism of foreign import. Whether the Qiṣaṣ al-Anbiyāʾ is a subdivision of Isra'iliyyat or the other way around, remains a scholarly debate.

Isra'iliyyat frequently appear in Qur'anic commentaries, Sufi narratives and Islamic literature. They are used to offer more detailed information regarding earlier prophets mentioned in the Bible and the Qur'an.

== History ==
The first known use of the term Isra'iliyyat is in a writing of the 10th-century historian and geographer al-Masudi (d. 345/946), in his Murūğ al-ḏahab, as he discusses traditions concerning the creation of the world. In this context, al-Masudi states that he is relying on stories from Israelites, or Isra'iliyyat. Al-Masudi often cites Wahb ibn Munabbih when discussing biblical history and prophetic narratives. Al-Masudi's usage

clearly indicates that the term Isrāʾīliyyāt was known in the IV/X sec. and that it was used to refer to a genre of prodigious stories about cosmogony and Biblical history of questionable reliability.

The next known usage is in the writings of Ibn al-Murağğā, in a text written around 430/1040, also in the context of narratives sourced from Wahb. In this case, Ibn al-Murağğā was directly citing a book of Wahb's entitled the Kītāb al-Isrāʾīliyyāt (Book of Israelite traditions). Al-Ghazali also uses the term in relation to the name of a book, but one that is not connected to Wahb's name. Whether Wahb composed a document by such a name is disputed (others instead attribute a similar text to Hammad ibn Salama (d. 783)). In addition to these, a few initial occurrences of the term can also be found in the works of Abu Bakr al-Turtushi, Abu Bakr ibn al-Arabi (a pupil of Turtushi), Ibn al-Jawzi, and some others. What these usages indicate is that before the 13th and 14th centuries, usage of the term was not systematic (though well-attested), that the term was used in a few different senses (especially in terms of a book name, or as references to unreliable traditions about cosmogony or prophets originating among the Israelites).

Until the 14th century, the term Isra'iliyyat did not play a significant role and was not systematically used. It was only until Ibn Taymiyya (d. 1328) that the Isrā'īlīyyāt came to be understood as a collection of unreliable traditions of supposed Jewish origin, related to earlier narrators, such as Wahb ibn Munabbih and Ka'b al-Ahbar, whose authority was still retained by earlier Sunni scholars, such as Al-Tabari.

Nevertheless, it was Ibn Taymiyya's student Ibn Kathīr who first systematically used the term for traditions that he vehemently rejected. He treats not only the traditions themselves, but also the narrators, such as ʿAbdallāh ibn ʿAbbās, disparagingly. But it was not until the 20th century that the systematic use of Isrā'īlīyyāt became established. They are often criticized, especially today in the Arab world, and viewed as “un-Islamic”. Only in the Turkish regions are Isrā'īlīyyāt occasionally used and tolerated. However, Arabic contemporary exegesis generally sees them as foreign to Islam and believes that elements such as the perspectives on prophetic figures, contradict or appear to contradict certain theological beliefs. The strong criticism of this literature is a modern phenomenon and stands in contrast to the intensive use of these texts in pre-modern times. For that reason, political rather than traditional motivations have been proposed as a motivator for the contemporary usage of the label Isrā'īlīyyāt.

== Transmission into Islamic sources ==
There is no clear evidence regarding the exact manner by which Biblical, Talmudic, or other religious themes might have entered Islamic literature. Muslim sources indicate a number of individuals who converted to Islam from Judaism among the first generations of Muslims and were transmitters of Isrā'īlīyyāt. These include such names as Ka’b al-Ahbar and Abd Allah b. Salam. Some sources also suggest that “Muslims studied with practicing Jews,” though the nature and extent of such coeducation is not clear. Biblical events and exegetical commentaries of Jewish origin may also have entered Islamic tradition via educated Christians of Eastern churches such as those of Abyssinia and/or through various local populations of Jews in the Yemen and the Arabian Peninsula.

== List of notable transmitters ==
Notable individuals to whom the transmission of stories of Isra'iliyyat are:

- Kaʽb al-Akhbār (d. 652)
- Abu al-Darda (d. 652).
- Tamim al-Dari (d. 661).
- Abdullah ibn Salam (d. 663), described as a rabbi before his conversion to Islam.
- Ibn ‘Abbas (d. 687 CE), a cousin and young companion (Sahaba) of Muhammad. He is regarded as one of the greatest authorities on the Qur’an in general and especially the place of Isra’iliyyat in its interpretation.
- Wahb b. Munabbih (d. 732), who was born in the generation after the Sahaba, and who is cited as a trustworthy source for many oral accounts linked to Jewish and Christian traditions.
