= Banu Daws =

Ancient Arabian tribe

Map of the Arabian Peninsula in 600 CE, showing the various Arab tribes and their areas of settlement. The Lakhmids (yellow) formed an Arab monarchy as clients of the Sasanian Empire, while the Ghassanids (red) formed an Arab monarchy as clients of the Roman Empire A map published by the British academic Harold Dixon during World War I, showing the presence of the Arab tribes in West Asia, 1914

The Banu Daws (Arabic: بنو دوس) was one of the clans of Arabia during Muhammad's era. Located south of Mecca, it is a branch of the Zahran tribe, among its leaders was Tufayl ibn Amr, one of Muhammad's companions. Abu Hurayra, another companion, also hails from the Daws tribe.

== Islamic prophecy ==
There are Islamic prophecies with regard to the end times (یوم القيامة) that have quoted the tribe; a well-known one is narrated by Abu Hurayra, documented in Sahih al-Bukhari:

أَبُو هُرَيْرَةَ ـ رضى الله عنه ـ أَنَّ رَسُولَ اللَّهِ صلى الله عليه وسلمقَالَ "لاَ تَقُومُ السَّاعَةُ حَتَّى تَضْطَرِبَ أَلَيَاتُ نِسَاءِ دَوْسٍ عَلَى ذِي الْخَلَصَةِ". وَذُو الْخَلَصَةَ طَاغِيَةُ دَوْسٍ الَّتِي كَانُوا يَعْبُدُونَ فِي الْجَاهِلِيَّةِ.

Translation:

Narrated Abu Huraira: Allah's Messenger (ﷺ) said, "The Hour will not be established till the buttocks of the women of the tribe of Daws move while going round Dhu'l-Khalasa." Dhu'l-Khalasa was the idol of the Daws tribe which they used to worship in the Pre-Islamic Period of ignorance.

== People ==
- Tufayl ibn Amr — Chief
- Abu Hurayra

== See also ==
- Islam
- Quraysh — tribe of the Islamic Prophet Muhammad
- Banu Hashim — clan of the Quraysh and Muhammad
