= Abd Allah ibn Awn =

Islamic scholar and ḥadīth transmitter (685–768 CE)

ʿAbd Allāh ibn ʿAwn

Personal life
- Born: 685 CE/66 AH
- Died: 768 CE/151 AH Baṣra
- Main interest: Hadith studies Fiqh

Religious life
- Religion: Islam

ʿAbd Allāh bin ʿAwn bin Arṭabān al-Muzanī al-Ḥāfiẓ ( Arabic: عَبْد الَّلَه بِن عَوْن بِن أَرْطَبَان المُزَنِي الحَافِظ) was a ḥadīth transmitter from Baṣra who was a part of a core group of proto-Sunnī intellectuals. He is alleged to have studied with the likes of Ḥasan al-Baṣrī, Makḥūl, and Ibn Sīrīn, among others, and many later ḥadīth transmitters narrated from him.

== Biography ==
ʿAbd Allāh bin ʿAwn was a mawla of Ibn Barza al-Muzanī, hence the nisba al-Muzanī, and early sources state that his mother was Khurāsānī. He studied in Kūfa and Baṣra and was said to have collected upwards of 7,000 ḥadīth after travelling throughout the region of Syria and the Hijaz. From his home base in Baṣra, ʿAbd Allāh bin ʿAwn supported the Umayyads after the death of ʿUthmān, and strongly condemned the stances of both the Muʿtazila and the Qadariyya (not to be confused with the Qadiriyya). Aside from his status as an early intellectual, ʿAbd Allāh bin ʿAwn was regarded as a devoted Muslim, known for his humility and rejection of wealth. There are many anecdotes that highlight his use of lamentation, abstinence from careless speech, fasting, refraining from joking around, and avoidance of doing harm, be it to a king or to a chicken. In addition, he is said to have gone out to Greater Syria (al-Shām) in order to fight against non-Muslims on the Byzantine frontier. This point is notable as it represents the multifaceted nature of the devotion of early Muslims, which contains elements of learning, humility, and warfare. In this regard ʿAbd Allāh bin ʿAwn was similar to ʿAbd Allāh bin Mubārak and Haywa bin Shurayḥ.
