= Munabbih ibn Kamil =

Companion of Muhammad

Munabbih ibn Kamil ibn Sij ibn Dhi Kibar Abu-Abdullah al-Yamani al-San'ani was a companion (Arabic: Sahaba) of the Islamic prophet Muhammad.

He converted to Islam during the lifetime of Muhammad. He was a Persian knight, and was married to a Himyarite. He had two sons, Wahb ibn Munabbih and Hammam ibn Munabbih. He came from Herat in Khorasan to Yemen.

== See also ==
- List of non-Arab Sahaba
- Sunni view of the Sahaba
- Al-Abna'
