= Sahifat Hammam ibn Munabbih =

One of the earliest hadith collections

Ṣaḥīfat Hammām ibn Munabbih صحيفة همام بن منبه
- Author: Hammam ibn Munabbih
- Language: Arabic
- Genre: Hadith collection

Ṣaḥīfat Hammām ibn Munabbih (Arabic: صحيفة همام بن منبه), lit. 'The Book of Hammam ibn Munabbih', is a hadith collection compiled by the Yemeni Islamic scholar Hammam ibn Munabbih (d. 101 AH / 719 CE or 130 AH / 748 CE). It is sometimes quoted as one of the earliest surviving works of its kind.

The Sahifat exists in three somewhat variant recensions, one of which is in Ahmad ibn Hanbal's Musnad.

== Discovery and publication ==
It is one of the oldest surviving collections of hadith; it exists in various manuscript collections, and printed versions are widely available. The original manuscript of the text has been lost, but it survives through secondary copies. It was first discovered and published in the 20th century by Muhammad Hamidullah. This publication was a collation of two manuscript copies of Sahifa Hammam ibn Munabbih, one found in a library in Damascus and the other in a library in Berlin. The collection contains 138 hadith.

== Sources ==
According to Ahmad ibn Hanbal, Hammam ibn Munabbih was a disciple of Abu Hurairah. Abu Hurairah is the authority from whom he relates the narrations comprising the sahifah in their isnads (chains of narration), noting "this is what Abū Ḥurayra told us, on the authority of Muhammad the Messenger of God, peace and blessings be upon him".

One issue in the study of Hammam's sources is the plausibility of the age at which Hammam could have transferred his traditions from Abu Hurairah. It is typically accepted that Hammam's death date of 749/750 is more plausible than that of 719, in which case Hammam's death date is 73 years after that of Abu Hurairah. In this scenario, Hammam may have had to learn his narrations at the age of fifteen from Abu Hurairah when the latter was at a considerably advanced age.

== Literature ==
R. Marston Speight has studied the variation in the wording between equivalent hadith found across the collections in the Sahifat, that of the Musnad of Ahmad ibn Hanbal, as well as Sahih al-Bukhari and Sahih Muslim.

== Editions ==
- Ṣaḥı̄fat Hammām ibn Munabbih. 1st ed., edited by Rifʿat Fawzı̄ ʿAbd al‐Muṭṭalib. Cairo: Maktabat al‐Khānjı̄. (1985)
- Sahifah Hammam ibn Munabbih : the earliest extant work on the Hadith Muhammad Hamidullah tr. Muhammad Rahimuddin, Centre culturel islamique (Paris, France); 1979

== See also ==
- List of Sunni books
- The Great History
