= Makhul al-Shami =

Makḥūl al-Shāmī was an early 8th-century Muslim jurist, muhaddith and tābiʿī based in Damascus, Syria. His teachers included Anas ibn Mālik and Ṭāwūs ibn Kaysān while a number of other prominent scholars studied under him, such as ʿAbd al-Raḥmān al-Awzāʿī, ʿAbd al-Raḥmān ibn Yazīd ibn Jābir, Yazīd ibn Yazīd ibn Jābir, Muḥammad ibn Isḥāq, Thawr ibn Yazīd, and ʿIkrima ibn ʿAmmār.

Makhul was of Sindī origins; reports Ibn Qutaybah on the authority of Ibn ʿĀʾisha. He was taken as a war captive during a raid on Kabul, then under the Kabul Shahis. Being a native of Sind, he used to speak Arabic with a strong accent. He was freed in Egypt and later settled in Damascus, where he became one of the leading jurists. He died in 118 AH/736 CE.

== See also ==
- Ibn al-A'rabi
- Ibn 'Ulayya
- Kushajim
