= Hammam ibn Munabbih =

Islamic scholar (died 719)

Philosophical work
- Era: Medieval era

Hammam ibn Munabbih (Arabic: همام بن منبه) was an Islamic scholar, from among the Tabi‘in and one of the narrators of hadith.

== Biography ==
=== Family ===
Hammam was the son of Munabbih ibn Kamil and brother of Wahb ibn Munabbih.

=== Students ===
According to the Siyar A'lam al-Nubala' of Al-Dhahabi, Hammam would teach one of his main students, Ma'mar ibn Rashid, about the traditions of Abu Hurayra in Medina. Subsequently, Ma'mar travelled to and lived out the rest of his life in Sanaa. Later, Mam'ar's traditions were transmitted to ʽAbd al-Razzaq al-Sanʽani, Abdullah b. al-Mubarak, and others.

=== Death ===
There is disagreement among scholars on the date of Hammam's death. Two conflicting clusters of dates exist for Hummam's death in biographical dictionaries. The first cluster being 101 or 102AH/719-720, the second being 131 or 132AH/749-750. The more common death date in the sources is 749/750, and Harald Motzki has proposed that the alternative date may have been a product of a copying error.

== Sahifah ==
Hammam was one of the 9 students of Abu Hurairah. Abu Hurairah used to narrate the hadith he heard from the Prophet to his nine students. Of all nine, only the Sahifah Hammam ibn Munabbih, composed by Hammam, is quoted by extant sources. The first quote is in the Musannaf Ibn Abi Shaybah. The entire text is also copied into the Musnad of Ahmad ibn Hanbal.

== See also ==
- List of Islamic scholars
