= Ka'b al-Ahbar =

7th-century Muslim scholar

Abū Isḥāq Kaʿb ibn Maniʿ al-Ḥimyarī
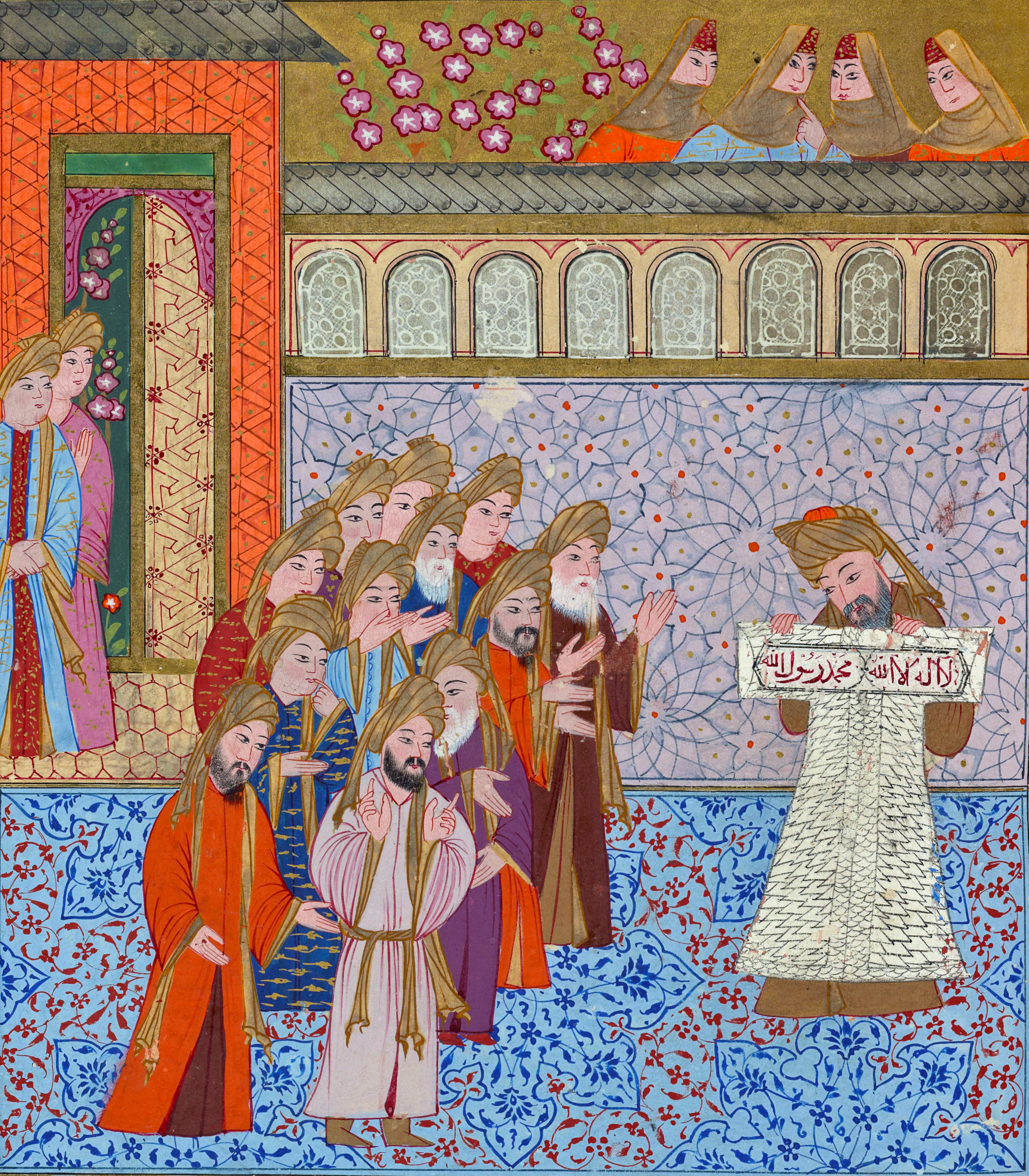
- Islamic miniature depicting Ka'b al-Ahbar watching the Shahada appear miraculously on Yahya's talismanic shirt after being cut out once
- Died: 652/656; Hims

Philosophical work
- Era: Early Muslim period
- Region: Rashidun Caliphate
- Main interests: Israʼiliyyat

Kaʿb al-Aḥbār (Arabic: كعب الأحبار, full name Abū Isḥāq Kaʿb ibn Maniʿ al-Ḥimyarī (Arabic: ابو اسحاق كعب بن مانع الحميري) was a 7th-century Yemenite Jew from the Arab tribe of "Dhī Raʿīn" (Arabic: ذي رعين) who converted to Islam. He was considered to be the earliest authority on Israʾiliyyat and South Arabian lore. According to Islamic tradition, he accompanied ʿUmar in his trip from Medina to Jerusalem, and afterwards, became a supporter of ʿUthman. He died in Hims around 652-56.

== Name ==
The epithet al-Aḥbār (الأحبار) is the Arabic broken plural of ḥabr or ḥibr (حبر, "scribe" or "scholar", attested in the Qurʾan in 5:44, 5:63, 9:31, and 9:34), a loanword derived from the Hebrew and Aramaic title ḥāḇēr (חָבֵר, lit. "fellow" or "associate"). In Talmudic usage, ḥāḇēr denoted both a scholar ranked immediately below an ordained Rabbi and a member of a fellowship (ḥaḇūrā) strictly observing ritual purity laws; Kaʿb al-Ḥabr thus means "Kaʿb the Scholar", while Kaʿb al-Aḥbār signifies "Kaʿb of the Scholars".

== Biography ==
Little is known about Ka‘b, but according to tradition, he came to Medina during the reign of ‘Umar. He then accompanied ‘Umar in his voyage to Jerusalem. It is reported that when ‘Umar marched into Jerusalem with an army, he asked Ka‘b: "Where do you advise me to build a place of worship?" Ka‘b indicated the Temple Rock, now a gigantic heap of ruins from the temple of Jupiter. The Jews, Ka‘b explained, had briefly won back their old capital a quarter of a century before (when Persians overran Syria), but they had not had time to clear the site of the Temple, for the Byzantines (Rūm) had recaptured the city. It was then that ‘Umar ordered the rubbish on the Temple Rock to be removed by the Nabataeans, and after three showers of heavy rain had cleansed the Rock, he instituted prayers there. ‘Umar is said to have fenced it and, some years later, the Umayyad caliph ʿAbd al-Malik built the Dome of the Rock over the site as an integral part of the Aqsa compound. Until this day, the place is known as al-Qubbat as-Ṣakhra (the Dome of the Rock).

According to the fuller account preserved by al-Tabari (via Raja ibn Haywa) and Abu ʿUbayd al-Qasim ibn Sallam, when Kaʿb advised placing the Muslim prayer site (muṣallā) north of the Rock so as to combine the Jewish and Muslim qiblas, ʿUmar rebuked him for imitating Judaism after seeing him remove his sandals, and instead ordered the mosque to be built at the southern edge of the platform (the site of the Al-Aqsa Mosque). While historians such as Heribert Busse and Andreas Kaplony view the dispute over the northern versus southern qibla as a later Umayyad-era etiological legend explaining why worshippers in the southern mosque pray with their backs to the Rock, they note that Kaʿb's removal of his sandals reflects rabbinic halakha (Mishnah Berakhot 9:5), and that the southern site—located on the Herodian extension (the former Court of the Gentiles)—lay outside the inner sanctuary precinct forbidden to Jews in a state of corpse impurity (ṭumʾat met).

According to tradition, Ka‘b believed that "Every event that has taken place or will take place on any foot of the earth, is written in the Tawrat (Torah), which God revealed to his Prophet Moses". He is said to have predicted the death of ‘Umar using the Torah. According to one narration, Ka‘b told ‘Umar "you ought to write your will because you will die in three days." ‘Umar responded "I do not feel any pain or sickness". Abu Lulu assassinated ‘Umar two days later.

After ‘Umar's death, Ka‘b vigorously supported ‘ʿUthman. Subsequently, governor Muʿawiya asked Ka‘b to become his counsel in Damascus, but he most likely chose to withdraw to Hims, where he died in AD 652-56, according to various accounts. His burial place is disputed. A son named Tubai survived him.

According to Shiʿa sources Ka‘b was a Jewish rabbi, who moved from Yemen to Bilad al-Sham (Syria). He was of the clan of Dhu Ra'in or Dhu al-Kila. Ka‘b came to Medina during the time of ʿUmar where he converted to Islam. He lived there until ʿUthman's era.

== Disputed views: Rashidun period ==
ʿAbd Allah Ibn ʿAbbas, a cousin of the Islamic prophet Muhammad, disputed a view attributed to Ka‘b that "on the day of the judgement the sun and the moon will be brought forth like two stupefied bulls and thrown to hell". According to Al-Tabari, Ibn Abbas responded "Ka‘b has uttered an untruth!" three times, quoting the Qurʾan that the sun and moon are obedient to Allah. He accused Ka‘b of trying to introduce Jewish myths into Islam. As demonstrated by David J. Halperin and Gordon D. Newby, this motif ("two castrated bulls", thawrāni ʿaqīrān) and related cosmological traditions attributed to Kaʿb derive not from the Babylonian Talmud, but from pre-Islamic Yemenite Jewish apocalypticism closely linked to 1 Enoch and Merkaba mysticism.

== Sunni view ==
Ibn Hajar ʿAsqalani, a 14th-century Sunni Shafiʿi scholar, wrote,

Ka`b Ibn Mati` al-Himyari, Abu Ishaq, known as Ka`b al-Ahbar, is trustworthy (thiqah). He belongs to the 2nd [tabaqah]. He lived during both Jahiliyyah and Islam. He lived in Yemen before he moved to Sham [~Syria]. He died during the Caliphate of `Uthman exceeding 100 years of age. None of his reports are in al-Bukhari. He has one narration in Muslim from Abu Huraira from him on the authority of al-A`mash from Abu Salih.

Al-Tabari quoted intensively about Ka'b in his History of the Prophets and Kings. Other Sunni authors also mention Ka‘b and his stories with Caliphs ‘Umar, ‘Uthman and Mu‘awiya.

=== Mention in hadith canons ===
Ka‘b al-Ahbar is mentioned in some hadith canons such as Sahih Muslim and Muwatta Malik etc. A Hadith reports that the Caliph ‘Umar Ibn al-Khattab appointed him personally an Amir over Muslims.

== Twelver Shiʿa view ==
Within the Shi‘a tradition Ka‘b is seen as an unreliable figure. Muhammad al-Tijani a 20th-century Sh‘'a scholar writes that "He was a Jew from Yemen who pretended to have embraced Islam then went to Medina during the reign of ‘Umar ibn al-Khattab." Mohamad Jawad Chirri writes, after having quoted a hadith, "This dialogue should alert us to the deceptive and successful attempt on the part of Ka‘b to influence future events by satanic suggestions. It contains a great deal of deception which produced many harmful results to Islam and the Muslims." Ka‘b's influence is deprecated within the Shi‘a tradition of Islam.

== Jewish and Christian view: Jewish influence on Islam ==
Ka‘b is intensively mentioned within Jewish sources as a rabbi who had influence over early Sunni Islam. Liran Yadgar of Yale University stated in 2017 that "Christians and Jews adopted Ka‘b into their legends on the emergence of Islam, wishing to refute the credibility of the Qur’ān by referring to Jewish converts such as Ka‘b as those who corrupted Muḥammad's scripture from within." See also #Twelver Shi'a view.

According to geographer and Holy Land explorer, Rabbi Joseph Schwarz (1804-1865), Ka‘b is associated with the development of the Sunni "tradition", i.e. hadith. R. Gottheil and H. Hirschfeld write in the 1906 Jewish Encyclopedia that Ka‘b belongs to the initiators of Muslim "tradition", and is among those who provided it with both "the method as well as many details of the Jewish Midrash", i.e. lore, as opposed to legalistic exegesis, much like ʿAbd Allah Ibn Salam, another even earlier Jewish convert. Together, write Gottheil and Hirschfel, the two created the base for "the legends which glorify Mohammed's youth and prophetic call."

Ka‘b has stated that "the world will last six thousand years", a statement known from the Tractate Sanhedrin of the Babylonian Talmud ("R. Kattina said: Six thousand years shall the world exist", and "The Tanna debe Eliyyahu teaches: The world is to exist six thousand years.")

== Historicity ==
It has been argued that Ka‘b may be more of a legendary figure and accounts of his life and influence on Islam have been referred to as myths.

== Kaʿb's sayings ==
In the book Asceticism and Tenderness, Ka‘b al-Ahbar said ''While the Children of Israel were praying in the Temple of Jerusalem, two men came. One of them entered and the other did not. He stood outside at the gates of the mosque and said: I am entering the House of God. No one like me enters the House of God. I have done such and such and such. And he began to weep but did not enter. Ka‘b said: So it was written the next day that he was a truthful man''

In the book Comprehensive remembrance of the doctrines of the jurists of the countries; It was reported to him that ‘Umar bin Al-Khattab wanted to go to Iraq, so Ka‘b al-Ahbar said to him: Do not go there, O Commander of the Faithful, for there is nine-tenths of magic, and there are wicked Jinn, and there is a fatal disease.

In several sayings, he referred to Egypt being superior to other countries.

== See also ==
- ‘Abd Allah Ibn Saba’, 7th-century Yemenite Jewish convert to Islam
