= Darussalam Publishers =

Saudi and Pakistani based global Islamic publishing house

Darussalam International Publishing & Distribution (also known as Dar-us-Salam in the U.S.) is a Saudi Arabian and Pakistan-based, multilingual international publishing house which operates in 35 countries, but mainly printing in Sheikhupura, Pakistan. As of November 2020, it was the second-largest publisher of translations of the Islamic scripture (Qur'ān and Hadith collections) in the world after the King Fahd Complex for the Printing of the Holy Quran publishing house.

== History ==
The printing house is recognized as one of the largest privately owned entities in the world for Islamic scripture-related printing and distribution. It was founded in 1986 by the Mecca-based Pakistani Islamic scholar Abdul Malik Mujahid. According to its website, the publishing house commercially launched as a single retail outlet in Saudi Arabia, eventually expanding operations to over 35 countries, including 32 physical stores and a worldwide distribution network. As of March 2017, the company has published over 1,500 Islamic books in various languages. Its catalogue includes more than 64 books on the life of the Muslim prophet Muhammad, as well as translations and interpretations of the Qur’an and other Islamic literature in 29 languages. It also completed a translation of the six Sahih Hadith books into English, which comprises 38 volumes and a total of 20,780 pages.

In promotional literature, the organisation declares its adherence to Italian and Lebanese printing standards, with their production primarily based in Lebanon, Saudi Arabia, Italy, and China.

== Output and recognition ==
The publishing claims to have issued the first-of-its-kind English-language book series on Islamic studies, intended for grade school students and based on the syllabus developed by the UAE Ministry of Education.

D&B estimated that the Darussalam International bookstore for publishing and distribution has $1.43 million annual revenue and nearly 500 employees.

In March 2012, it reportedly published the first ever English-language prophetic biography (sirah) of Muhammad as an 11-volume Encyclopedia.

In November 2020, after launching the Punjabi language translation it became the second-largest publisher of translations of Islamic scripture in the world.

In 2021, it became the first foreign owned private publishing company to have a partnership agreement with the government of Dubai's official media organization (Dubai Media Incorporated) to make the Qurʼān and other Islamic scripture available in more than 30 languages.

== Sections and major works ==
Darussalam's product offerings primarily consist of copies of the Quran and books on Islamic beliefs and teachings. On its U.S, English-language website, it offers books according to thematic categories that include:

- Qur'an and Mushaf
- Hadith
- Fiqh and Aqidah
- Islamic Living
- Health Supplements
- Islamic Education
- Children's Books
- History
- Gifts

Among the key published works offered by the printing house are as follows:

- Islamic Studies – (Grades 1-12) – ISBN 978-9960500140
- Dictionary of Islamic Terms (English–Arabic/Arabic–English) – ISBN 978-9693051407
- Arabic Course (3 Volume) – ISBN 978-9960986067
- Tafsir Ibn Kathir – English (10 Volume) – ISBN 978-1591440208
- Sahih Al-Bukhari – English (9 Volume) – ISBN 978-9960717326
- The Noble Life Of The Prophet (3 volume) – ISBN 978-9960967875
- Fathul Bari Sharh Sahih Al-Bukhari (15 Vol Set) – ISBN 9782987466116
- The Sealed Nectar (Ar Raheeq Al Makhtoum) – Color 1 7x24 – ISBN 9786035001106
- Stories of the Prophets in English – ISBN 9789960892269
- The Last World – ISBN 9786035003834
- Zakah according to Quran and Sunnah - Eng. – ISBN 9786035001540
- An Inspiration to the World – ISBN 9786039177234

=== Digital Books and Specialised Learning ===
Along with printed books it also publishes digital eBooks, audiobooks on platforms such as Amazon Kindle and Apple Books, and digital education apps. In 2016, Darussalam reported that it had begun digitising its book collection, organising an eBook library in collaboration with Bilal Philips' Islamic Online University. Darussalam maintained that it was the first Islamic publishing house in the Muslim world to digitise its previously published books in print, as well as the first to provide digital learning materials. For the digitisation effort, the company established a dedicate IT and digital media subsidiary named “Dtech Systems”.

In a 2012 profile of the publishing house by Arab News, Founder and General Manager Abdul Malik Mujahid emphasised its digital educational devices for Islamic learning and resources for students. Mujahid elaborated on the more than 100 publications that it offered, specifically kid-friendly "easy-to-learn" books in "attractive and colorful formats." The general manager also described the English-language Islamic studies series covering all school grades 1 to 12. It claims to be the only institute producing electronic devices and toys for children to learn about Islam. These include a "Pen Qur’an," to learn to recite the Qur'an easy and recite it without the need of an assistant and "Salatee" ("My Prayer") to learn how pray the five daily prayers properly.

Darussalam provides educational devices to learn Qur’anic teachings through computer technology, most notably "Baba Salam", a mini-laptop (MLP) intended for children to utilise in learning the Quran, Supplications and other Islamic knowledge. As of 2015, the publishing house reported offer more than 30 such devices, stating the most popular were the Digital Qur’an, The Teacher and Al Bayaan.

Darussalam established its own studio in 2015, at which time it possessed more than 500 audio cassettes and CDs in English and Urdu. In that year, it also reported possessing several books and packages specifically designed for the new Muslims and non-Muslims for the purpose of propagating Islam (dawah).
