= The four Sunni Imams =

Namesake for main Sunni madhhabs

The four Sunni Imams were the namesakes of the four main madhhabs recognized in Sunni Islam. While they agree on the foundational principles of fiqh according to the Sunni narrative, their interpretations of certain legal and practical matters differ, which led to the development of the four distinct madhhab. These differences reflect variations in legal methodology and reasoning, but all are considered valid within the broader framework of fiqh.

Imam Abu Hanifa is the first of the four imams and the only tabi'i among them. He also had the opportunity to meet a number of the companions of the Prophet. Imam Malik ibn Anas was a sheikh of Imam Shafi'i. Imam Muhammad ibn Idris al-Shafi'i was a student of Imam Malik and a sheikh of Imam Ibn Hanbal. Imam Ahmad ibn Hanbal was a student of Imam al-Shafi'i.

== Madhhab ==
- Hanafi school of thought was founded in Kufa, Iraq, by Imam Abu Hanifa al-Nu'man (80 AH/699 AD - 150 AH/767 AD).
- Maliki school of thought was founded in the Medina, Hejaz. by Imam Malik ibn Anas (93 AH/715 AD - 179 AH/796 AD).
- Shafi'i school of thought was founded in al-Fustat, Egypt by Imam Muhammad ibn Idris al-Shafi'i (150 AH/766 AD - 204 AH/820 AD) and subsequently expanded in Egypt.
- Hanbali school of thought was founded in Baghdad, Iraq by Imam Ahmad ibn Hanbal (164 AH/780 AD - 241 AH/855 AD).
