= Ibn Kathir =

Arab Islamic exegete, historian and scholar (c. 1300–1373)

- اِبْنُ كَثِيرٍ
- Title: Imam

Personal life
- Born: Abu al-Fida Ismail ibn Umar ibn Kathir al-Dimashqi c. 1300 (700 AH) Bosra, Sham, Mamluk Sultanate
- Died: 27 February 1373 (774 AH) Damascus, Mamluk Sultanate (now Syria)
- Era: Medieval Era (Middle Ages)
- Region: Sham
- Main interests: History; exegesis; jurisprudence; creed
- Notable work(s): Tafsir Ibn Kathir; Tarikh Ibn Kathir; Kitab al-Jami' al-Sira al-Nabawiyya
- Occupation: Scholar; historian; exegete; jurist; theologian

Religious life
- Religion: Islam
- Denomination: Sunni
- Jurisprudence: Shafi'i
- Creed: Athari

Muslim leader
- Influenced by: Al-Tabari, Ibn Asakir, al-Nawawi, Ibn Taymiyya, Al-Dhahabi, Ibn al-Qayyim
- Influenced: Ibn Abi al-Izz, Al-Zarkashi, Ibn al-Jazari
- Arabic name
- Personal (Ism): Ismāʿīl إسماعيل
- Patronymic (Nasab): ibn ʿUmar ibn Kaṯīr بن عمر بن كثير
- Teknonymic (Kunya): Abū al-Fidāʾ أبو الفداء
- Epithet (Laqab): ʿImād al-Dīn عماد الدين "pillar of the faith"
- Toponymic (Nisba): Al-Dimashqi; Al-Qurashi; Al-Busrawi

Imad al-Din Abu al-Fida Ismail ibn Umar ibn Kathir al-Dimashqi (Arabic: أبو الفداء إسماعيل بن عمر بن كثير الدمشقي, romanized: Abū al-Fidā' Ismā'īl ibn 'Umar ibn Kathīr al-Dimashqī; c. 1300–1373), often known simply as Ibn Kathir, was an Arab Islamic exegete, historian and scholar. An expert on tafsir (Quranic exegesis), tarikh (history) and fiqh (Islamic jurisprudence), he is considered a leading authority on Sunni Islam.

Born in Bostra, Mamluk Sultanate, located in modern-day Syria. Ibn Kathir's teachers include Ibn Taymiyya and al-Dhahabi. He wrote several books, including a fourteen-volume universal history titled al-Bidaya wa'l-Nihaya (Arabic: البداية والنهاية).

His renowned tafsir, Tafsir Ibn Kathir, is recognized for its critical approach to Israʼiliyyat, (stories from non-Muslim backgrounds such as Jewish, Christian or Zoroastrian sources), especially among Western Muslims and Wahhabi scholars. His methodology largely derives from his teacher Ibn Taymiyya and differs from that of other earlier renowned exegetes such as al-Tabari to some extent. He adhered to the Athari school of Islamic theology which rejected rationalistic theology in favor of strict textualism in the interpretation of the Quran and the hadith.

== Biography ==
His full name was Abū l-Fidāʾ Ismāʿīl ibn ʿUmar ibn Kaṯīr (أبو الفداء إسماعيل بن عمر بن كثير) and had the laqab (epithet) of ʿImād ad-Dīn (عماد الدين, 'pillar of the faith'). His family traces its lineage back to the tribe of Quraysh. He was born in Mijdal, a village on the outskirts of the city of Busra, in the east of Damascus, Syria, around about AH 701 (AD 1300/1). He lost his father at the age of three, in AH 703 / AD 1303. He received his first lessons of Islamic jurisprudence from his elder brother, Kamal al-Din abd al-wahhab. He was taught by Ibn Taymiyya and Al-Dhahabi.

Upon completion of his studies he obtained his first official appointment in 1341, when he joined an inquisitorial commission formed to determine certain questions of heresy.

He married the daughter of Al-Mizzi, one of the foremost Syrian scholars of the period, (he was the head of the Dār al-Ḥadīth al-Ashrafiyya, a leading ḥadīth academy in Damascus, became the greatest `Ilm al-rijāl (عِلْمُ الرِّجال) scholar of the Muslim world and an expert grammarian and philologist of Arabic) which gave him access to the scholarly elite. In 1345 he was made preacher (khatib) at a newly built mosque in Mizza which is a great honor at the time, the hometown of his father-in-law. In 1366, he rose to a professorial position at the Great Mosque of Damascus.

In later life, he became blind. He attributes his blindness to working late at night on the Musnad of Ahmad Ibn Hanbal in an attempt to rearrange it topically rather than by narrator. He died in February 1373 (AH 774) in Damascus. He was buried next to his teacher Ibn Taymiyya.

== Creed ==
The records from modern researchers such as Taha Jabir Alalwani, Yazid Abdu al Qadir al-Jawas, and Barbara Stowasser has demonstrated important similarities between Ibn Kathir and his influential master Taqi al-Din Ibn Taymiyyah, (a Sunni Muslim scholar, jurist, Mujtahid, traditionist, Qadiri Sufi, proto-Salafi theologian and iconoclast). such as rejecting logical exegesis of Qur'an, advocating a militant jihad and adhering to the renewal of one singular Islamic ummah. In contemporary scholarship, Ibn Kathir is widely regarded as an anti-rationalistic, hadith oriented scholar who adhered to the Athari creed, much like his mentor Ibn Taymiyya. According to Jane McAuliffe in regards of Qur'anic exegesis, Ibn Kathir uses methods contrary to former Sunni scholars, and followed largely the methodology of Ibn Taymiyyah. Barbara Freyer contends that this anti-rationalistic, traditionalistic and hadith oriented approaches held by Ibn Kathir were shared not only by Ibn Taymiyyah, but also by Ibn Hazm, Bukhari independent Madhhab, and also scholars from Jariri, and Zahiri Maddhabs. According to Christian Lange, although he was a Shafi, he was closely aligned with Damascene Hanbalism. David L. Johnston described him as "the traditionist and Ash'arite Ibn Kathir".

Taha Jabir Alalwani, Professor and President of Cordoba University in Ashburn, Virginia maintains that these traditionalistic views of Ibn Kathir claimed by Salafists were rooted further to the generation of Sahaba Salaf, where Zubayr ibn al-Awwam, one of The ten to whom Paradise was promised also taught this view. Contemporary researchers notes that these anti rationalistic, anti Ash'arite methods of Ibn Kathir shared with his teacher Ibn Taimiyyah; were proven in his tafseer regarding the Day of Resurrection and Hypocrisy in Qur'an.

Ibn Kathir states:

"People have said a great deal on this topic and this is not the place to expound on what they have said. On this matter, we follow the early Muslims (salaf): Malik, Awza'i, Thawri, Layth ibn Sa'd, Shafi'i, Ahmad ibn Hanbal, Ishaq Ibn Rahwayh, and others among the Imams of the Muslims, both ancient and modern that is, to let (the verse in question) pass as it has come, without saying how it is (min ghayr takyif), without likening it to created things (wa la tashbih), and without nullifying it (wa la ta'til): The literal meaning (zahir) that occurs to the minds of anthropomorphists (al-mushabbihin) is negated of Allah, for nothing from His creation resembles Him: "There is nothing whatsoever like unto Him, and He is the All-Hearing, the All-Seeing" Rather this affair is like what the Grand Shaykh of Imam Bukhari Shaykh Naeem ibn Hamaad Khazaa'i said "Whosoever likens Allah to his Creation has done Kufr (disbelieved) and whosoever negates what Allah describes Himself with has also done Kufr (Disbelieved) There is nothing with what Allah describes Himself with nor his Prophet describes Allah with from likening Allah to his Creation (tashbeeh). Whosoever affirms for Allah what has reached Us from the Truthful Ayahs (verses) and Correct Hadeeth (Prophetic narrations) on the way that is befitting the Majesty of Allah while negating from Allah all defects indeed He has traveled the way of guidance." (Tafsir Ibn Kathir 7:54)

These words from Ibn Kathir were argued by Athari scholarship as proof of Ibn Kathir not being Ash'arite. According to Salafi Muslims, since Ibn Kathir does not use logical rationale to reject anthropomorphism, he believed the attributes of God cannot be likened to creatures, while simultaneously affirming the verses and hadith about God's Attributes such as residence above His Throne and His Exaltation above all creatures. Salafis rebut Ash'arite claims as Formal fallacy regarding Ibn Kathir tafsir, and other claims such as four madhhab schools as supporting Ash'ari and Maturidites are fabrications. For this, they employ the reports from Ahmad ibn Hanbal who rejected the views of those who were allegedly deemed as proto Asharites and Maturidites, the Mutakallim, and deems them as not in Ahl as Sunnah teaching. According to Livnat Holtzman, historically the school of Ahl al-Hadith championed by none other than Ibn Kathir's master, Ibn Taymiyyah, had successfully crushed the interrogation and accusation from Ash'arite rational (Kalam) argumentations during the 13th AD century. while modern scholars such as Marzuq at Tarifi, and Sa'id Musfir al-Qahtani further posited that Abu al-Hasan al-Ashʿari, the eponym of Asharite school, himself was not fond of his "Asharite followers" and pointed out on his book, al-ibāna, that Abu al Hasan was teaching the method similar to Ahmad ibn Hanbal, Ibn Taymiyyah, Ibn Kathir, and rejected the Ahl al Kalam and Maturidites such as Al-Razi.

In summary, Jon Hoover outlined that Ibn Kathir stance according to scholars were orthodox traditionists and rejected the view of Mutakallims, just like the view of Salafi Muslims and their predecessor Ahl al-Hadith school.

=== View of some Ash'arite scholars ===
In the modern times, Ibn Kathir's creed have sometimes been raised as a subject of disagreement between the Ash'arites, successor of Ahl al-Ra'y rationalist school and the Salafis, theorized by Jon Hoover as successor of Ahl al-Hadith traditionist school. Some Ash'arite theologians have claimed Ibn Kathir as an Ash'ari, pointing out some of his beliefs and sayings reported from his works, and to the fact that:

- He belonged to the Shafi'i school of Islamic jurisprudence and was a professor of Hadith at the House of Hadith known as "Dar al-Hadith al-Ashrafiyya" which was exclusively established for those aligned to the Ash'ari school of creed, as mentioned by Taj al-Din al-Subki (d. 771/1370) in his Tabaqat al-Shafi`iyya al-Kubra (Comprehensive Biographical dictionary of Shafi'ites) that a condition to teach at the al-Ashrafiyya was to be Ash'ari in 'aqida.
- Ibn Hajar al-'Asqalani (d. 852/1449) reported in his al-Durar al-Kaminah (The Hidden Pearls: on the Notables of the Eighth Islamic Century), that a dispute between Ibn Kathir and the son of Ibn al-Qayyim al-Jawziyya broke out over teaching position. It seems Ibn Kathir implied that the dislike for him is due to his Ash'ari roots, and once Ibn al-Qayyim's son confronted him about this and said that even if Ibn Kathir swore to high heavens that he wasn't upon the creed of Ibn Taymiyya, people wouldn't believe him, because his sheikh (teacher) is Ibn Taymiyya.

== Works ==
=== Tafsir ===
Ibn Kathir wrote a famous commentary on the Qur'an named Tafsīr al-Qurʾān al-ʿAẓīm better known as Tafsir Ibn Kathir which linked certain Hadith, or sayings of Muhammad, and sayings of the sahaba to verses of the Qur'an, in explanation and avoided the use of Isra'iliyyats. Many modern Sunni Muslims hold his commentary as the best after Tafsir al-Tabari and Tafsir al-Qurtubi and it is highly regarded especially among Salafi school of thought. Although Ibn Kathir claimed to rely on at-Tabari, he introduced new methods and differs in content, in attempt to clear Islam from that he evaluates as Isra'iliyyat. His suspicion on Isra'iliyyat possibly derived from Ibn Taimiyya's influence, who discounted much of the exegetical tradition since then. Deviating from the methods of his teacher however, Ibn Kathir also supplements the exegetical material with his own commentary.

While his tafsir had only marginal impact in the premodern period, it gained widespread popularity in modern times, especially among Western Muslims, probably due to his straightforward approach, but also due to lack of alternative translations of traditional tafsirs. Ibn Kathir's Tafsir work has played major impact in the contemporary movements of Islamic reform. Salafi reformer Jamal al-Din Qasimi's Qurʾānic exegsis Maḥāsin al-taʾwīl was greatly influenced by Ibn Taymiyya and Ibn Kathīr, which is evident from its emphasis on ḥadīth, Scripturalist approaches, the rejection of Isrāʾīliyyāt, and a polemical attitudes against the Ahl al-raʾy. From the 1920s onwards, Wahhabi scholars also contributed immensely to popularisation of ḥadīth-oriented hermeneutics and exegeses, such as Ibn Kathīr's and al-Baghawī's Qurʾān commentaries and Ibn Taymiyya's al-Muqaddima fī uṣūl al-tafsīr, through printing press. The Wahhābī promotion of Ibn Taymiyya's and Ibn Kathīr's works through print publishing during the early twentieth century emerged instrumental in making these two scholars popular in the contemporary period and imparted a robust impact on modern exegetical works.

==== In Western academic discourse ====
Tafsīr al-Qurʾān al-ʿAẓīm is controversial in western academic circles. Henri Laoust regards it primary as a philological work and "very elementary". Norman Calder describes it as narrow-minded, dogmatic, and skeptical against the intellectual achievements of former exegetes. His concern is limited to rate the Quran by the corpus of Hadith and is the first, who flatly rates Jewish sources as unreliable, while simultaneously using them, just as prophetic hadith, selectively to support his prefabricated opinion. Otherwise, Jane Dammen McAuliffe regards this tafsir as "deliberately and carefully selected, whose interpretation is unique to his own judgment to preserve, that he regards as best among his traditions."

==== Unabridged English translations ====
1. Exegesis of the Grand Holy Qur'an (4 volumes) by Dr. Muhammad Mahdi Al-Sharif. It was published in 2006 by Darul Kutub Al-'Ilmiyyah in Lebanon.
2. Another translation by Mawlana Muhammad Ameen Khaulwadiyah, the director of Darul Qasim in Glendale Heights, Chicago, Illinois is in progress. Only 2 volumes have been published so far.

==== History ====
One of Ibn Kathirs most renowned and significant works was his historical record, al-Bidaya wa’n-Nihaya. It is known for its detailed and consistent account of Islamic history. It begins from the time of the creation of the world, the section referred to as "al-bidaya" ("the beginning"). The work covers the biography of Muhammad and continues through the history of Muslims according to the caliphates all the way to the 767 AH. The book covers political affairs, foreign relations, famines, epidemics and short biographies.

=== Hadith ===
- Al-Jāmiʿ (الجامع) is a grand collection of Hadith texts intended for encyclopedic use. It is an alphabetical listing of the Companions of the Prophet and the sayings that each transmitted, thus reconstructing the chain of authority for each hadith.
- al-Takmil which was a catalogue of the first Muslim traditionalists, using the Tahdhib al-Mizzī and the work of al-Dhahabi.

== See also ==
- Ibn Taymiyya
- Ibn Sufi
- Al-Tabari
- Al-Qurtubi
