= Tufayl ibn Amr =

Chief of the Banu Daws tribe (died 633 CE)

Al-Ṭufayl ibn ʿAmr al-Dawsī (Arabic: الطفيل بن عمرو الدوسي) (died 633) was the chief of the Banu Daws tribe from Tihama in pre-Islamic times.

== Career ==
He accepted Islam around four years before the hijra in 622 CE and helped spread Islam among his fellow tribesmen. During the Ridda wars, he led a contingent of his people against the impostor Mosailima. In the Battle of Yamama, Tufayl ibn Amr fell as a martyr.

It is narrated in the books of hadiths that when he traveled to Makkah for Hajj, as usual, he was warned by Makkans not to approach or listen to Mohammad. They told him Mohammad was a magician. Tufail was so worried that he put cotton wool in his ears in order to avoid hearing Mohammad. Tufail was doing tawaf when he saw Mohammad reciting a part of the Quran. Tufail was curious and thought that he was the head of his tribe and a smart man and therefore how would a magician take over him so he removed the cotton wool from his ears and came close to Mohammad and listened to the Quran.
