= Tafsir Ibn Kathir =

Qur'anic exegesis book by Ibn Kathir

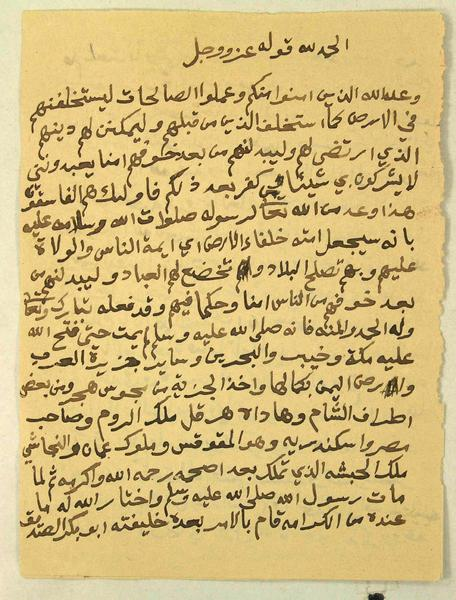
- A page from an Arabic manuscript of Tafsir Ibn Kathir
- Author: Ibn Kathir
- Language: Arabic
- Genre: Tafsir
- Publication date: 14th Century
- Publication place: Mamluk Sultanate
- English publication date: 2006
- Original text: Tafsir Ibn Kathir at Arabic Wikisource

Tafsir al-Qur'an al-Azim (Arabic: تفسير القرءان العظيم, romanized: Tafsīr al-Qurʾān al-ʿAẓīm), commonly known as Tafsir Ibn Kathir (Arabic: تفسير ابن كثير, romanized: Tafsīr Ibn Kathīr), is a 14th Century Qur'anic exegesis (tafsir) by Ibn Kathir. It is one of the most famous Islamic books concerned with the science of interpretation of the Quran.

It also includes jurisprudential rulings, and takes care of the hadiths and is famous for being almost devoid of Israʼiliyyat. It is the most followed tafsir by Salafists.

== Background ==
Ibn Kathir did not specify the date of his beginning in commentary, nor the date of its completion, but some deduce the era in which he composed it based on a number of evidence; Of which

- That he composed more than half of the exegesis in the life of his sheikh al-Mazzi (died 742 AH), based on the fact that he mentioned when interpreting Surat al-Anbiya his sheikh al-Mazzi and prayed for him for a long life.
- Abdullah Al-Zayla’i (died 762 AH) quoted him in his book Takhreej Ahadith al-Kashshaf, which indicates that it was spread before the year 762 AH.
- It is likely that he finished his exegesis on Friday, 10 Jumada al-Thani 759 AH (1358 AD), when it came in the Meccan version, which is considered the oldest copy.

=== The status of the exegesis and opinions of scholars ===
- Al-Suyuti said: “He (i.e. Ibn Katheer) has an exegesis that was not composed according to his style.”
- Muhammad bin Ali Al-Shawkani said: “He has the famous exegesis, and it is in volumes, and it was collected in Va’i and transmitted the schools of thought, stories and traditions, and spoke the best and most authentic speech, and it is one of the best exegeses.
- Ahmed Muhammad Shakir said: “After that, the exegesis of Al-Hafiz Ibn Kathir is the best of the exegeses that we have seen, and the best and most accurate after the exegesis of the Imam of the commentators Abi Jaafar Al-Tabari.”
- Muhammad bin Jaafar al-Kitani said: “It is loaded with hadiths and narrations with the chains of transmission of their narrators, while discussing them with authenticity and weakness.”
- Abd al-Aziz bin Baz said: ““The exegesis of Ibn Katheer is a great exegesis, an exegesis of the Salaf according to the methodology of Ahl al-Sunnah wal-Jama’ah, and the hadiths are taken care of, in collecting their transmissions, as well as authentication and attribution, I know of no equal to it.”

== Description ==
=== By Darussalam Publications ===
According Darussalam Publications, this tafsir divided in 10 volume with 30 parts. Each volume is 9x6" Hardback and has around 650 pages. those are below.

- Volume 1: Parts 1 and 2(Surah Al-Fatihah to Verse 252 of Surah Al-Baqarah)
- Volume 2: Parts 3, 4 & 5 (Surah Al-Baqarah, Verse 253 to Surah An-Nisa, Verse 147)
- Volume 3: Parts 6, 7 & 8 (Surah An-Nisa, Verse 148 to the end of Surat Al-An'am)
- Volume 4: ~ Parts 8 to 11 (Surah Al-A'raf to the end of Surah Yunus)
- Volume 5: ~Parts 11 to 15 (Surah Hud to Surah Al-Isra' Verse 38)
- Volume 6: ~Parts 15 to 18 (Surat Al-Isra', Verse 39 to the end of Surat Al-Mu'minun)
- Volume 7: ~Parts 18 to 22 (Surat An-Nur to Surat Al-Ahzab, Verse 50)
- Volume 8: ~Parts 22 to 25 (Surat Al-Ahzab Verse 51 to Surat Ad-Dukhan)
- Volume 9: ~Parts 25 to 28 (Surah Al-Jathiyah to Surat Al-Munafiqun)
- Volume 10: ~Parts 28 to 30 (Surah At-Taghabun to end of the Quran)

== Edition ==
Edition History
Year	Language	Translator	Publication	Type
2000	English (Abridged 10 volumes)	Ṣafī al-Raḥmān Mubarakpuri	Darussalam, Riyadh	Print Book
2003	English (Abridged 10 volumes)	Ṣafīur-Raḥmān Mubarakpuri	Darussalam, Riyadh	eBook
2006	English (Unabridged 4 volumes)	Dr. Muhammad Mahdi Al-Sharif	Darul Kutub Al-Ilmiyyah, Beirut	Print Book
2000	Arabic	Ṣafīur-Raḥmān Mubārakfūri	Darussalam, Riyadh	Print Book
2009	Urdu			Print Book
2010	Kurdish	Ali Haji Abdullah Press	Nawandi Roshnber, Sulaymaniyah	Print Book
2019	Telugu			Print Book
2022	Bangla/Bengali	Dr. Muhammad Mujibur Rahman	Tafseer Publication Committee	Print Book
