= Thawr ibn Yazid =

Abu Khalid Thawr ibn Yazid ibn Ziyad al-Kula'i (Arabic: أبو خالد ثور بن يزيد بن زياد الكلائي) died 775 AD, was an Islamic scholar of the 8th century. He lived in Jerusalem after being forced out of Homs because of his opinions. He was in conflict with Malik ibn Anas and had been accused of belonging to the Qadariyya school.

His tomb is in Tripoli, Lebanon.

== External references ==
- Gil, Moshe (1997) [1983]. A History of Palestine, 634–1099. Translated by Ethel Broido. Cambridge: Cambridge University Press. pp. 281–282. ISBN 0-521-59984-9.
