= Abd Allah ibn Salam =

Companion (Sahaba) of Muhammad

ʿAbdullah Ibn Salam
- Islamic miniature depicting Abd Allah Ibn Salam arguing to the Jews that the Tawrat foretells the coming of Muhammad

Theologian, Disciple of Muhammad, Servant of Peace
- Born: al-Ḥuṣayn Ibn Salam c. 550 C.E. (disputed); Yathrib, Hejaz
- Died: 663 C.E. Medina, Umayyad Caliphate
- Venerated in: Islam
- Influences: Moses, Muhammad, Aaron, Hebrew prophets
- Influenced: Commentators on the Qur'an, especially Tafsir al Qurtubi and Ibn Ishaq

ʿAbd Allāh Bin Salām (Arabic: عَبْدُ اللَّه بِن سَلَام, Hebrew: עבד אלוה בן שלום, ʿEbed Elôh Ben Šalōm), born al-Ḥuṣayn Bin Salam (Arabic: حصين; Hebrew: חצין, Ḥoṣēn) was a companion of the Islamic prophet Muhammad, and a Jew who converted to Islam. He participated in the conquest of Syria and Palestine, but died in Medina.

== Biography ==
=== Early years ===
Abdullah Ibn Salam was a Jew in Medina (known as Yathrib at the time), who belonged to the Banu Qaynuqa tribe, claiming descent from the Tribe of Joseph. He was widely respected and honored by the people of the city, including those who were not Jewish. He was known for his piety and goodness, his upright conduct, and his truthfulness.

Abdullah Ibn Salam lived a peaceful life but was serious, purposeful and organized in the way he spent his time. For a fixed period each day, he would worship, teach and preach in the synagogue.

Then he would spend some time in his orchard, looking after date palms, pruning and pollinating. Thereafter, to increase his understanding and knowledge of his religion, he would devote himself to the study of the Torah.

In his study, it is said he was particularly struck by some verses of the Torah which dealt with the coming of a prophet who would complete the message of previous prophets. Abdullah ibn Salam therefore took an immediate and keen interest when he heard reports of the appearance of a prophet in Mecca. He used to stop at certain passages in the Torah and ponder a long time upon the news therein of the prophet who was to appear to complete the Message of all the prophets before him. The more he read the more he became convinced that the foretold prophet was Muhammad who appeared among his people in Mecca.

=== Conversion of Abd Allah ===
In 622, Muhammad left Mecca for Medina. When he reached Medina and stopped at Quba, a man came rushing into the city, calling out to people and announcing the arrival of Muhammad and supposedly told his aunt, who was sitting nearby: "Aunt, he is really the brother of Moses, by God, and follows his religion". Tradition recounts Abdullah's early life in his own words:

When I heard of the appearance of the Messenger of God (peace be upon him) I began to make enquiries about his name, his genealogy, his characteristics, his time and place and I began to compare this information with what is contained in our books. From these enquiries, I became convinced about the authenticity of his prophethood and I affirmed the truth of his mission. However, I concealed my conclusions from the Jews. I held my tongue.

Then came the day when the Prophet, peace be upon him, left Makkah and headed for Yathrib. When he reached Yathrib and stopped at Quba, a man came rushing into the city, calling out to people and announcing the arrival of the Prophet.

At that moment, I was at the top of a palm tree doing some work. My aunt, Khalidah bint Al-Harith, was sitting under the tree. On hearing the news, I shouted: Allahu Akbar! Allahu Akbar! (God is Great! God is Great!
When my aunt heard me, she remonstrated with me: May God frustrate you... By God, if you had heard that Moses was coming you would not have been more enthusiastic.

Auntie, by God, he is really the brother of Moses, and follows his religion. He was sent with the same mission as Moses. She was silent for a while and then said: Is he the Prophet about whom you spoke to us who would be sent to confirm the truth preached by previous (Prophets) and complete the message of his Lord?

Yes, I replied. Without any delay or hesitation, [I] went out to meet the Prophet. [I] saw crowds of people at his door. I moved about in the crowds until I reached close to him. The first words I heard him say were: 'O people! Spread peace...Share food...Pray during the night while people sleep... and you will enter Paradise in peace...' I looked at him closely. I scrutinized him and was convinced that his face was not that of an imposter. I went closer to him and made the declaration of faith that there is no god but God and that Muhammad is the Messenger of God. The Prophet turned to me and asked: 'What is your name?' 'Al-Husayn ibn Salam,' I replied. 'Instead, it is (now) Abdullah ibn Salam,' he said (giving me a new name). 'Yes,' I agreed. 'Abdullah ibn Salam (it shall be). By Him who has sent you with the Truth, I do not wish to have another name after this day.' I returned home and introduced Islam to my wife, my children and the rest of my household.

=== In the Qur'an ===
Reportedly the Qur'an implicitly mentions Abdullah ibn Salam, "Say, 'Have you considered: if the Qur'an was from Allah, and you disbelieved in it while a witness from the Children of Israel has testified to something similar and believed while you were arrogant?' Indeed, Allah does not guide the wrongdoing people" (Qur'an, 46:10). Tafsir al-Jalalayn mentions in its exegesis of this verse that the "witness" in the verse refers to Abdullah ibn Salam.

=== Promise to Abd Allah ===
Abdullah ibn Salam was the first Muslim that was promised Paradise while he was still alive. In a Hadith, it was reported that one day while Muhammad was sitting with the best of his companions, he said "Do you want to see a man walking on Earth and in Paradise?" Each one of the companions looked in silence towards Muhammad hoping he would mention their name. Muhammad pointed in the distance and the companions saw he was looking towards Abd Allah ibn Salam.

During the end of Caliph Uthman, Abdullah tried to protect Uthman and gave advice to the rebels who surrounded Uthman's house but was ignored by the rebels.

=== Death ===
He died in 663 in Medina.

== Non-Muslim view ==
Although Muslim sources generally state that he converted immediately after Muhammad’s arrival to Medina, some non-Muslim scholars give more credence to other Muslim sources that allegedly indicate 630 as the year of Ibn Salam’s conversion.

== See also ==
- Masa'il Abdallah ibn Salam
- Salaf
- Banu Abd-Shams – Sub-tribe of the Quraysh tribe
- Sahaba
- List of non-Arab Sahaba
- Sunni view of the Sahaba
- Jewish tribes of Arabia
