= Jami' al-Usul =

Hadith collection by Majd ad-Dīn Ibn Athir

Jami' al-Usul fi Ahadith al-Rasul
- Editor: Abdul-Qadir al-Arna'ut
- Author: Majd ad-Dīn Ibn Athir
- Original title: جامع الأصول في أحاديث الرسول
- Language: Arabic
- Genre: Hadith collection
- Publisher: Dar Ibn Kathir
- Publication date: 2016
- Publication place: Damascus, Syria
- Pages: 13 volumes
- ISBN: 978-9953-520-85-8

Jāmiʿ al-Uṣūl fī Aḥādīth al-Rasūl (Arabic: جامع الأصول في أحاديث الرسول, lit. 'The Compendium of the Foundations in the Hadiths of the Messenger') is a multi-volume hadith collection compiled by the Islamic scholar Majd ad-Dīn Ibn Athir. It gathers and reorganizes narrations from the six canonical Sunni hadith collections, as well as other sources like the Muwatta Malik, organizing them thematically for ease of study and reference. This work is considered a cornerstone for hadith studies.

== Background ==
The idea of compiling the Kutub al-Sitta together was first realized by the Andalusian traditionist Razīn b. Muʿāwiya al-Sarakustī (d. 535/1140), who replaced Ibn Mājah's Sunan with Mālik's al-Muwaṭṭaʾ and gathered the six canonical collections without commentary in his al-Jamʿ bayna’l-uṣūl al-sitta. Ibn al-Athīr later revised and expanded this compilation, correcting omissions and reorganizing the material alphabetically, producing Jāmiʿ al-Uṣūl min Aḥādīth al-Rasūl.

== Methodology and structure ==
Jāmiʿ al-Uṣūl fī Aḥādīth al-Rasūl is regarded as Ibn al-Athīr’s most important and influential work. Modelled on, yet improving upon, Rāzīn's Kitāb al-Tajrīd (d. 525 AH), it represents a major contribution to the corpus of hadith literature. The compilation brings together traditions from Mālik's Muwaṭṭaʾ, the Ṣaḥīḥayn of al-Bukhārī and Muslim, the Sunan of Abū Dāwūd and al-Nasāʾī, and the Jāmiʿ of al-Tirmidhī. Following Rāzīn’s approach, Ibn al-Athīr abbreviated the isnād (chain of transmission) by retaining only the name of the first transmitter namely, the Companion in the case of hadith or the Successor (tabi'in) in the case of āthār. This method made the work more accessible by allowing readers to focus on the text of the tradition without the lengthy sequence of narrators.

His principal innovation, however, lay in arranging the hadiths thematically by subject matter. This organization represented a significant methodological advancement, enabling readers to locate relevant narrations within the canonical collections more easily. To identify the source of each hadith, Ibn al-Athīr employed a system of abbreviations for instance, “خ” for al-Bukhārī, “م” for Muslim, and “ط” for Mālik’s Muwaṭṭaʾ and listed all applicable symbols when a report appeared in multiple works. Recognizing the importance of asmāʾ al-rijāl (biographical study of transmitters), he also appended a supplementary section containing concise biographical notices of narrators.

The work is divided into three major parts (rukn): al-Mabādiʾ, which summarizes principles of hadith methodology; al-Maqāṣid, containing the texts of the hadiths; and Kitāb al-Lawāḥiq, comprising narrations that did not fit into specific categories. In the introduction, he outlines his motivation for compiling the work: to make hadith easier to reference and search. He also discusses the methodology of the muḥaddithīn (hadith scholars) in determining authenticity, as well as the techniques of collection and codification. The latter sections of the book serve as a guide to navigating the text, with the third part functioning as an index or key to the hadiths, providing a highly detailed and systematic table of contents to facilitate study and reference.

A distinctive feature of the work is Ibn al-Athīr's added linguistic explanatory glosses on difficult or rare (gharīb) expressions, provided at the end of each alphabetic section under titles such as “Sharḥ gharīb al-alif” or “Sharḥ gharīb al-nūn.” The compilation arranges topics alphabetically but preserves thematic unity, sometimes placing related subjects together under one heading.

== Commentaries and abridgements ==
Due to its scholarly precision and comprehensiveness, Jāmiʿ al-Uṣūl became a central reference for hadith studies. Numerous commentaries and abridgements were produced based on it:

1. Tajrīd Jāmiʿ al-Uṣūl min Aḥādīth al-Rasūl by Ibn al-Bārizī Hibat Allāh (d. 738/1338).
2. Tahdhīb al-uṣūl fī aḥādīth al-Rasūl by Ṣalāḥ al-Dīn Khalīl b. Kaykaldī al-ʿAlāʾī (d. 761 A.H.)
3. Tashīl Ṭarīq al-Wuṣūl ilā al-Aḥādīth az-Zāʾida ʿalā Jāmiʿ al-Uṣūl by Majd al-Dīn al-Fīrūzābādī (d. 817/1415).
4. Taysīr al-Wuṣūl ilā Jāmiʿ al-Uṣūl min Ḥadīth al-Rasūl by ʿAbd al-Raḥmān Ibn al-Daybaʿ al-Shaybānī (d. 950/1543).
5. Al-Fuṣūl by al-Muttaqī al-Hindī.
6. Mukhtaṣar by Abū Jaʿfar Muḥammad al-Marāzī.
7. Mukhtaṣar by Aḥmad b. Rizq Allāh al-Anṣārī al-Ḥanafī.

== Editions ==
Jāmiʿ al-Uṣūl has appeared in multiple editions. It was first printed in India (Meerut, 1346 A.H.), followed by a thirteen-volume edition by Muḥammad Ḥāmid al-Fiqī (Cairo, 1368–1375/1949–1955) and a fifteen-volume edition by ʿAbd al-Qādir al-Arna'ūṭ (Damascus, 1389–1412/1969–1991). Based on the latter, Yūsuf Muḥammad al-Biqāʿī prepared a two-volume index (Beirut, 1405/1984).

According to Fiqī's edition, the work contains 9,483 hadiths, while Arna'ūṭ's edition lists 9,523, a difference likely due to numbering discrepancies. In Arna'ūṭ's version, the explanations of gharīb words appear directly beneath the corresponding hadiths.

== See also ==
- List of Sunni books
- List of hadith books
