= Musnad Ishaq ibn Rahwayh =

Hadith book compiled by Imam Ishaq Ibn Rahwayh

- Author: Ishaq ibn Rahwayh
- Original title: مسند إسحاق بن راهويه
- Language: Arabic
- Subject: Islamic traditions
- Genre: Hadith collection
- Publication place: Abbasid Caliphate

Musnad Ishaq ibn Rahwayh (Arabic: مسند إسحاق بن راهويه) is one of the oldest hadith books and was compiled by Ishaq ibn Rahwayh, who is the teacher of the famous hadith scholars Muhammad al-Bukhari, Muslim ibn al-Hajjaj, al-Tirmidhi, and al-Nasa'i.

== Description ==
The book contains two thousand four hundred & twenty five (2425) hadiths according to Maktaba Shamila. It is one of the oldest Musnad (a kind of Hadith book arranged according to narrators) written. It is written in first century of Islamic Calendar and written before the most authentic book of Hadiths (narrations of the Islamic prophet, Muhammad) that are Sahihain (Sahih al-Bukhari & Sahih Muslim). The Musnad (مسند) are collections of Hadiths which are classified by narrators, and therefore by Sahabas (companions of Muhammad). The books contain both Authentic and weak narrations.

== Publications ==
The book has been published by many organizations around the world:

- Musnad Ishaq Ibn Rahwayh (مسند إسحاق بن راهويه) by Ishaq Ibn Rahwayh: Published: Dar al-Kitab al-Arabi, Beirut, 2002
- Musnad Isḥāq ibn Rāhwayh: Published: al-Madīnah : Tawzīʻ Maktabat al-Īmān, 1990-1991. (Beirut, Lebanon)

== See also ==
- List of Sunni books
- Kutub al-Sittah
- Sahih Muslim
- Jami al-Tirmidhi
- Sunan Abu Dawood
- Jami' at-Tirmidhi
- Either: Sunan ibn Majah, Muwatta Malik
