= Ibn Tahir =

Muslim historian and traditionist (c. 1057–1113)

Ibn Tahir ابن طاهر
- Title: Hafiz

Personal life
- Born: Jerusalem, Fatimid Caliphate
- Died: September 1113 Baghdad, Abbasid Caliphate
- Resting place: The Old Cemetery, west bank of the Tigris
- Era: Islamic Golden Age (Later Abbasid era)

Religious life
- Religion: Islam
- Denomination: Sunni
- Jurisprudence: Zahiri
- Movement: Sufism

Abu al-Fadl Muhammad ibn Tahir ibn Ali al-Qaysarani (Arabic: أبو الفضل محمد ابن طاهر ابن علي القيساراني, romanized: Abū al-Faḍl Muḥammad ibn Ṭāhir ibn ʿAlī al-Qaysarānī; 1057–September 1113), known simply as Ibn Tahir, was an Islamic scholar, historian and traditionist. He is largely credited with being the first to delineate and define the Six Books of Sunni Islam after the Qur'an, and the first person to include Sunan Ibn Maja as a canonical work.

== Biography ==
Ibn Tahir was born in Jerusalem in about 1057 to an Arab family originally from Caesarea, hence his name. Because of the Arabic name for Jerusalem being "Bait al-Maqdis," he was often nicknamed "Maqdisi" or the man from Jerusalem instead. His birth date is recorded by Ibn Khallikan as 6 Shawwal in 448 on the Islamic calendar, which William McGuckin de Slane reckoned as December 1056 on the Gregorian calendar.

Ibn Tahir traveled extensively in search of hadith, or narrations and reports, from the Islamic prophet Muhammad. He began learning hadith at the age of twelve and moved to Baghdad at the age of nineteen; after spending some time in Iraq, he returned to his hometown briefly before proceeding to perform the Muslim pilgrimage at Mecca. Eventually, he would travel and study throughout the Tihamah, the Hijaz, Syria, Egypt, Mesopotamia, Persia and Khorasan. He spent much of his life in Hamedan, in present-day Iran, where he wrote a number of respected works in his chosen field of study and gained wide renown for his scholarship and contributions. During his time in the East, he worked as a paid copyist for his hand-written editions of the collections of al-Bukhari, Muslim ibn al-Hajjaj, Abu Dawud and Ibn Majah.

Ibn Tahir died in Baghdad on a Friday while returning from another pilgrimage at Mecca, which he had performed multiple times during his life. Ibn Khallikan records the date as 28 Rabi al-awwal in the Hijri year 507, reckoned by de Slane as September 1113 Gregorian.

== Works ==
Ibn Tahir is widely regarded as the first person to index the six canonical books of Sunni tradition: Sahih al-Bukhari, Sahih Muslim, Sunan Abi Dawud, Sunan al-Tirmidhi, Sunan al-Nasa'i, and the aforementioned Sunan Ibn Maja. Despite their importance to the Muslim faith, no one had undertaken such a task prior to his work, and there was no way to search any of these books based on key words or important terms. Ibn Tahir was also noted for his work in bibliographic indexing and biographical dictionaries, fields in which he is considered an important early figure.

It was also due to Ibn Tahir's indexing efforts that Ibn Maja's collection was allotted the same respect as the other five main canonical Sunni works. Prior to Ibn Tahir's inclusion of Ibn Majah's collection in his indexing of the Sunni cannon, major hadith scholars such as Ibn al-Salah didn't actually hold Ibn Majah's work in the high esteem it would later enjoy. Ibn Tahir's index was also the first instance of formally organizing the Sunni cannon based around specific books of hadith. Given that his index predates Ali ibn al-Athir's The Complete History and Abd al-Ghani al-Maqdisi's Al-Kamal fi Asma' al-Rijal by at least a century, modern scholarship has credited Ibn Tahir with the establishment of the foundation for the Sunni Muslim cannon.

Ibn Tahir was a Zahirite, or literalist, in terms of Muslim jurisprudence. Having also been a practitioner of Sufism, Ibn Tahir wrote about the subject in both prose and poetry. He was criticized by theologians for his defense of Islamic music and dancing, which his detractors alleged were the precursors to Sufi whirling. Despite the respect accorded Ibn Tahir as a historian and traditionist, he was often criticized for the many grammatical errors in his books as well.

=== Edited works ===
- Homonyma inter nomina relativa. Trns. Peter De Jong. Lugduni Batavorum, 1865. Latin. OCLC 715731207

=== Original works ===
- Al-Mu'talif wa-l-mukhtalaf fi-l-ansab. Dar al-Kotb al-Ilmieh, 1991. Arabic. 225 pages. Amazon Standard Identification Number B004C2LSEO
