= As-Sunan al-Kubra =

Hadith book

- Author: Al-Nasa'i
- Original title: السنن الكبرى
- Language: Arabic
- Genre: Hadith collection

As-Sunan al-Kubra, (Arabic: سنن الكبرى), is a hadith book collected by Imam Al-Nasa'i (214 – 303 AH), not to be confused with the same titled book by Imam Al-Bayhaqi.

== Description ==
As-Sunan al-Kubra is the larger collection of the Sunan al-Nasa'i, having almost twelve thousand (12000) hadiths compared to the almost six thousand (6000) hadiths in the summarised version. The shorter collection is considered the next most authentic book of hadith (narrations of Muhammad) after the Sahihain (Sahih al-Bukhari & Sahih Muslim) within the six books, by most scholars of hadith.

== Commentaries ==
Among those who have written commentaries on this hadith collection are:

- Kitab al-Sunan al-Kubra al-Nasa'i 12 Volumes (كِتَابُ السُّنَن الكُبْرَى النَّسَائي) Commentary by Shaykh Shuaib Al Arna'ut & Shaykh al-Turki: Published: al-Risalah al-'Alamiyyah | Damascus/Beirut, Syria/Lebanon in 2011

== See also ==
- List of Sunni books
- Kutub al-Sittah
  - Sahih Bukhari
  - Sahih Muslim
  - Jami al-Tirmidhi
  - Sunan Abu Dawood
  - Either: Sunan ibn Majah, or Muwatta Malik
