= Abu al-Qasim al-Baghawi =

Jurist of Abbasid era (b. 829– d. 929)

Abū al-Qāsim al-Baghawī
- أبو القاسم البغوي
- Born: 829; Baghdād, Irāq
- Died: 929
- Other names: Abū al-Qāsim al-Baghawī, Abd Allāh ibn Muḥammad ibn 'Abd Allāh al-'Azīz al-Baghawī, (أبو القاسم عبد الله بن محمد بن عبد العزيز البغوي), kunya Ibn Bint Munī' (ابن بنت منيع)

Academic work
- Era: Abbasid Caliphate
- Main interests: jurist

Abū al-Qāsim, Abd Allāh ibn Muḥammad ibn 'Abd Allāh al-'Azīz al-Baghawī (829CE - 929CE) (kunya: Ibn Bint Munī') was a jurist in Baghdad. Al-Marzubānī was his pupil.

== Works ==
Among his books were:

- Kitāb al-Mu’jam (كتاب المعجم) ‘Large Alphabetical Book’;
- Kitāb al-Mu’jam aṣ-Saghīīr (كتاب المعجم الصغير) ‘Small Alphabetical Book’; (Note: Mu‘jam (“alphabetical”) may refer to an alphabetical dictionary arrangement, or to consonants marked with diacritical points. Editor Dodge in his English translation of Al-Fihrist note that these probably refer to two legal compilations. However editor De Slane in his translation to Ibn Khallikān’s Wafayāt notes this was a catalogue of the Companions of Muḥammad.)
- Kitāb al-Musnad (كتاب المسند); (Note: Musnad term related to isnad that refers to a ‘supported’, or ‘authenticated’, text according to Arab and Islāmic literary tradition.)
- Kitāb as-Sann ‘alā madhahib al-fiqha (كتاب السنن على مذاهب الفقهآء) The Ordinances According to the Legal Systems of the Jurists.

== Bibliography ==
- Ḥajar (Ibn), Abū al-Faḍl Aḥmad ibn 'Alī al-Asqalānī. Lisān al-Mīzān. Vol. 5 parts. Hyderabad: Dā'irat al-Ma'ārif al-Niẓāmīyah.
- Khallikān (Ibn), Aḥmad ibn Muḥammad (1843). Wafayāt al-A'yān wa-Anbā' Abnā' al-Zamān (The Obituaries of Eminent Men). Vol. I. Translated by McGuckin de Slane, William. Paris: Oriental Translation Fund of Great Britain and Ireland. p. 323, n.6.
- Nadīm (al), Abū al-Faraj Muḥammad ibn Isḥāq Abū Ya'qūb al-Warrāq (1970). Dodge, Bayard (ed.). The Fihrist of al-Nadim; a tenth-century survey of Muslim culture. New York & London: Columbia University Press.
- Nadīm (al-), Abū al-Faraj Muḥammad ibn Isḥāq (1872). Flügel, Gustav (ed.). Kitāb al-Fihrist (in Arabic). Leipzig: F.C.W. Vogel. p. 233 (489).
- Nawawī (al-), Abū Zakarīyā' Yaḥyā (1847) [1842]. Wüstenfeld, Ferdinand (ed.). Tahdhīb al-asmāʼ wa-al-lughāt (Biographical Dictionary of Illustrious Men) (in Arabic). Göttingen: London Society for the Publication of the Oriental Texts. p. 765.

== See also ==
- List of Arab scientists and scholars
