= Muhaddith =

Specialist who profoundly knows and narrates hadith

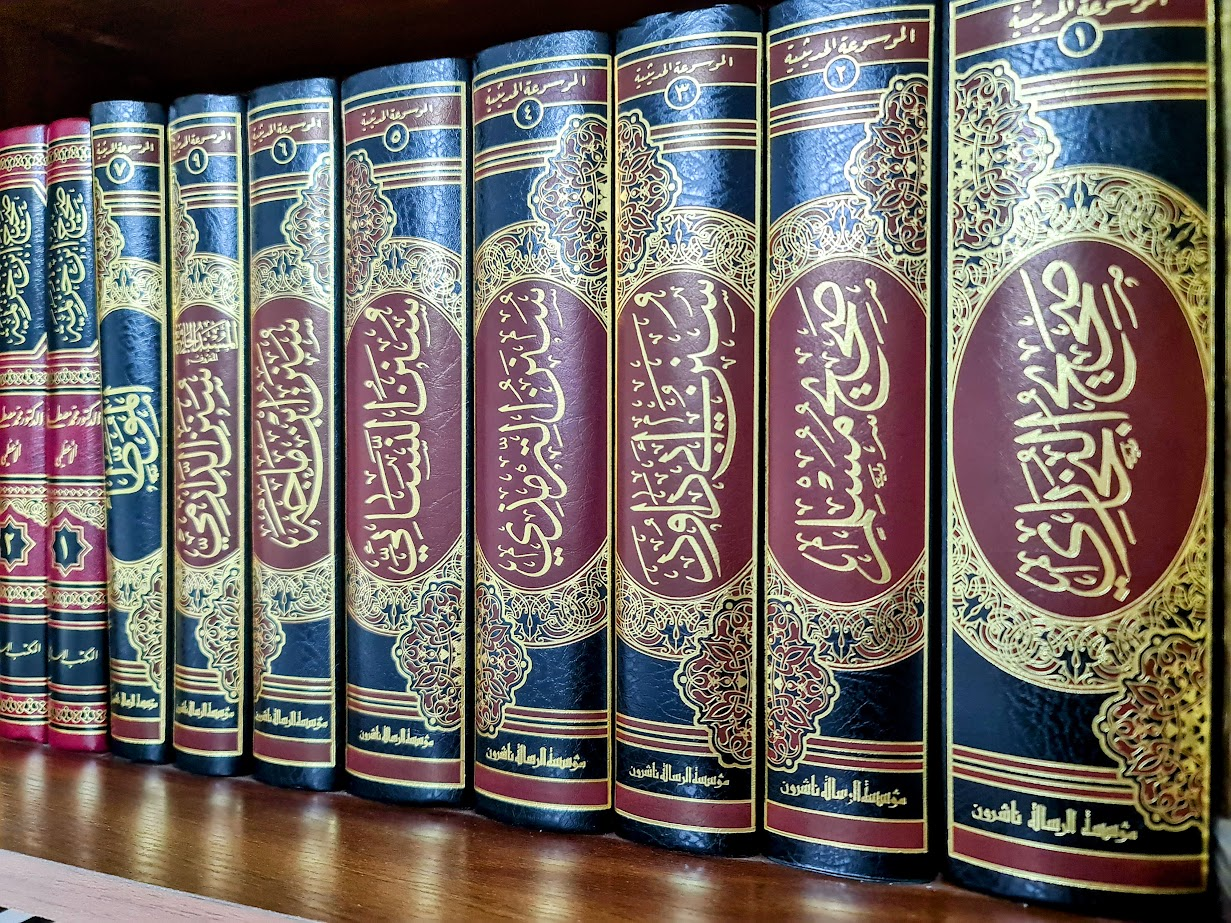
Books of the people of the Sunnah and the community.

A muhaddith (Arabic: ْمُحَدِّث) is a scholar specialized in the study, collection, and interpretation of hadiths, which are the recorded sayings, actions, and approvals of the Prophet Muhammad. The role of a muhaddith is central to the science of hadith (ʻilm al-ḥadīth), a key field for understanding and preserving Islamic teachings and laws. A Muhaddith can either disseminate the hadiths or compile them into an ahadith.

== Definition and requirements ==
A muhaddith is a narrator of hadith, expert in the chains of narration (isnad) and the content of hadith (matn). They are responsible for verifying the authenticity of these narrations through rigorous methods, including the evaluation of the reliability of transmitters and the continuity of the chains of transmission.

== Historical context ==
The tradition of collecting hadiths began soon after the death of Prophet Muhammad. Early efforts to compile these sayings into organized collections were undertaken by notable figures like Umar ibn al-Khattab and Umar ibn Abd al-Aziz. These efforts laid the groundwork for subsequent scholars, leading to the creation of the major hadith collections.

== Famous collections and compilers ==
Some of the most renowned hadith collections include:

=== Sunni ===
- Al-Muwatta — by Malik ibn Anas (died 179 AH)
- Musnad Ahmad — by Ahmad ibn Hanbal (died 241 AH)
- Sahih al-Bukhari — by Imam Bukhari (died 256 AH)
- Sahih Muslim — by Imam Muslim (died 261 AH)
- Sunan Abu Dawood — by Abu Dawood (died 275 AH)
- Sunan al-Tirmidhi — by Imam Tirmidhi (died 279 AH)
- Sunan an-Nasa'i — by Al Nasa'i (died 303 AH)
- Sunan Ibn Majah — by Ibn Majah (died 273 AH)

=== Shia ===
- Kitab al-Kafi — by Al Kulayni (died 329 AH)
- Man La Yahduruhu al-Faqih — by Ibn Babawayh (died 380 AH)
- Tahdhib al-Ahkam — by Shaykh Tusi (died 460 AH)
- Al-Istibsar — by Shaykh Tusi

These collections are highly regarded in Islamic scholarship and are used extensively in the derivation of Islamic law (Sharia) and theology.

== Scholarly views ==
Prominent scholars have outlined the qualifications and duties of a muhaddith. For example, Taj al-Din al-Subki emphasized the extensive knowledge required in the chains of narration, the defects of hadith, and the biographies of narrators. Al Zarkashi highlighted the need for comprehensive knowledge in the science of hadith and memorization of a significant number of hadiths and their chains.

== Importance in Islamic tradition ==
The role of muhaddithin is considered a blessing for the Muslim ummah (community), as they ensure the authenticity and preservation of the Prophet's teachings. This meticulous work allows Muslims to distinguish between genuine hadiths and those that are fabricated, maintaining the integrity of Islamic teachings.

== See also ==
- Kutub al-Sittah
- List of hadith books
