= Khasais of Amir Al Momenin =

Book by Al-Nasa'i

Khasais of Amir Al Mu'minin
- Author: Al-Nasa'i
- Language: Arabic
- Genre: Hadith, History of Islam
- Media type: Print book

Khasais of Amir Al Mu'minin (Arabic: خصائص أمير المؤمنين) (Characters of the commander of the faithful) or Khasais Ali (Arabic: خصائص علي) is a book on virtues and moral characters of the fourth Rashidun caliph and Imam Ali, who was the cousin, son-in-law, and the close companion of the Islamic prophet Muhammad. The book was written by Imam al-Nasa'i (died 303 AH). He was concerned in the book with the place of Ali and his relation to the Muhammad.

== Author ==
He was born (215 AH) in Nisa, Turkmenistan, located in Greater Khorasan in ancient times. Nesaei counted as one of the six confident narrators among Sunni in Islam religion. The book of Sunnah (Traditions) written by him, counted as one of the Sihah Settah (Six sources books) among Sunni. Zahabi says that: Nisai is more skillful than other narrators like Termadhi and Moslem.

== Motive of writing ==
Nisai traveled to Damascus in the last years of his life. He thought that Ali was abused, so he wrote the Khasa'is Ali, to tell people of the virtues of Ali ibn Abi Talib and his standing with Muhammad. This angered the 'Nasibis' (the term used for the people dislike Ali), who asked him to write a similar book about the virtues of Muawiya ibn Abi Sufyan. He refused, saying that there are no virtues reported about him (and this is the consensus among the scholars of hadith). But the Nasibis said that there are narrations, so he said "Only if you mean the Hadith "May Allah not fill his belly!" a hadith in which Muhammad cursed Muawiyah (a few Sunni scholars interpret this hadith as a blessing). This angered the Nasibis, so they beat him unconscious. He was transferred to Mecca, where he died reportedly because of the injuries of beatings.

== Content ==
Nisai reported nearly 188 narrations on the character of Imam Ali.

== Translation ==
The book has been translated into the Persian, Indian, Azeri and Urdu languages. Some of them are as follows:

- Translation to Persian by Lahouri: "Haqaeq Ladonni in explaining about the features of Alavi Characters"
- Translation by Najjar Zadegan

Recently Muhammad Kazim Mahmoudi has improved the book by adding more Sunni references.

== Publications ==
The book has been published by various publisher across the globe in different languages. The original book is in Arabic Language.

- Khasais-e-Ali by Imam Nasai, Published by: Book corner (2016)
- Khasais-E-Ali by Imam Nasai (Urdu Translation), Published by: Darussalam (2007)
