= Ibn al-Dayba' =

Yemeni Arab Muslim scholar (1461–1537)

Imam Ibn al-Dayba'
- ابن الدَيْبَع
- Title: Amir al-Mu'minin fī al-Hadith; Shaykh al-Islām; Hafiz al-Asr

Personal life
- Born: 1461 Zabid, Tahirid Sultanate
- Died: 1537 (aged 75–76) Zabid, Yemen Eyalet
- Era: Late Middle Ages
- Region: Yemen
- Main interest(s): Hadith, History, Genealogy, Islamic jurisprudence, Poetry
- Notable work(s): Taysīr al-Wuṣūl ilā Jāmiʿ al-Uṣūl; Bughyat al-Mustafīd fī Akhbār Madīnat Zabīd; Mawlid al-Dayba'i
- Occupation: Scholar, Jurist, Traditionist, Historian, Genealogist, Poet

Religious life
- Religion: Islam
- Denomination: Sunni
- Jurisprudence: Shafi'i
- Creed: Ash'ari

Muslim leader
- Influenced by: Al-Shafi'i Abu Hasan al-Ash'ari Al-Sakhawi
- Influenced: Murtada al-Zabidi Muhammad 'Alawi al-Maliki

ʿAbd al-Raḥmān ibn ʿAlī ibn Muḥammad ibn ʿUmar ibn ʿAlī al-Shaybānī al-ʿAbdarī al-Zabīdī al-Shāfiʿī, (Arabic: عبد الرحمن بن علي بن محمد بن عمر بن علي الشيباني العبدري الزبيدي الشافعي), commonly known as Ibn al-Daybaʿ (Arabic: اابن الديبع; 866–944 AH/ 1462–1537 CE) was a was a Yemeni Sunni scholar, hadith specialist, historian, genealogist, poet, and a jurist of the Shafi'i school. He was one of the leading hadith scholars of his time, he was regarded as Amīr al-Muʾminīn fī al-Ḥadīth ("Commander of the Faithful in Ḥadīth") and Khātimat al-Muḥaqqiqīn ("The Seal of the Verifiers"). His other known honorific epithets goes by Shaykh al-Islām and Hafiz al-Asr ("Hadīth Master of his Age"). He authored important works in history and prophetic traditions, most notably Taysīr al-Wuṣūl ilā Jāmiʿ al-Uṣūl and Bughyat al-Mustafīd fī Akhbār Madīnat Zabīd.

== Name and lineage ==
His full name and patronymic was 'Abd al-Rahman ibn Ali al-Shaybani al-Zabidi which indicated that he was from the Banu Shayban tribe. Hence, he is a descendant of the Arabian patriarch Adnan through Rabi'a ibn Nizar.

The nickname "Ibn al-Dayba'" was given to him by his grandfather Ali ibn Yusuf. Dayba' was a slang word founded by the local Ethiopians in Yemen that was used to describe a fair-skinned Ethiopian.

== Early life ==
He was born in Zabīd, Yemen, in 866 AH (1461 CE). His father died in India before his birth, so the young ʿAbd al-Raḥmān was raised under the care of his maternal grandfather, who ensured he received a proper upbringing.

=== Education ===
From childhood, he showed a strong aptitude for learning. He memorized the Qurʾān at an early age, mastering not only the text but also the seven canonical recitations. Alongside his Qurʾānic studies, he delved into mathematics (including arithmetic, algebra, and geometry), Islamic jurisprudence, and Arabic grammar, laying a foundation for both religious and rational sciences.

He undertook multiple pilgrimages (ḥajj) to Mecca, during which he also spent time in Medina, visiting the Prophet's Mosque and meeting prominent scholars of the Hijaz. These travels allowed him to study, exchange transmissions, and expand his scholarly network, further strengthening his standing as a muḥaddith (hadith scholar). He also engaged with visiting scholars and Sufis in Zabīd.

=== Teachers ===
His pursuit of knowledge soon focused on hadith, the sayings of the Islamic prophet Muhammad. He studied under some of the most prominent scholars of his time, both in Yemen and during his travels to the Hijaz. Among his notable teachers were:

- Shams al-Dīn al-Sakhāwī, his most important teacher in hadith and history.
- Zayn al-Din al-Zabidi
- Jamāl al-Dīn Muḥammad al-Ṭayyib ibn Ismāʿīl,
- Abū Ḥafṣ ʿUmar ibn Muḥammad ibn Maʿībīd al-Sirāj,

== Scholarly life ==
=== Career ===
Upon his return to Yemen, he rapidly established a reputation as a ḥāfiẓ, having memorized more than 100,000 ḥadīths along with their complete chains of transmission (asānīd). He became known as Amīr al-Muʾminīn fī al-Ḥadīth ("Prince of the Believers in Hadith"), a rare title reserved for the most eminent hadith authorities. The ruling Sultan ʿĀmir ibn ʿAbd al-Wahhāb held Ibn al-Daybaʿ in high esteem, appointing him professor of ḥadīth at the Great Mosque of Zabīd, where he taught publicly from the minbar, a position of considerable prestige. The sultan also granted him a residence in one of the city's most desirable quarters and fertile lands as an iqṭāʿ (land grant).

=== Students ===
Among his own students were:

- Abū al-Ḍiyāʾ ʿAbd al-Raḥmān al-Ghaythī,
- Muḥammad ibn Aḥmad al-Nahrūwī,
- Shaykh ibn ʿAbd Allāh ibn Shaykh al-ʿIdrūs,
- Aḥmad ibn ʿAlī al-Mazāji.

== Death ==
After a lifetime dedicated to teaching, writing, and guiding students, Ibn al-Dayba' died in Zabīd in 944 AH (1537 CE) at the age of 78. He was buried in his hometown, remembered as one of Yemen's greatest hadith masters and historians in history.

== Reception ==
Al-ʿAydarūs said concerning him:

“The Imām, the Ḥāfiẓ, the authoritative proof, the precise master scholar, Shaykh al-Islām, the foremost scholar of mankind, the brilliant master, the Musnid of the world, the Commander of the Faithful in the ḥadīth of the Chief of Messengers, the seal of the verifiers, and the shaykh of our most distinguished teachers. He was trustworthy, righteous, a preserver of reports and traditions, humble, and the leadership of scholarly travel in the science of ḥadīth ended with him. Students came to him from all regions of the earth.”

Al-Shawkani said:

“He studied in Mecca under al-Sakhāwī, then excelled, particularly in the field of ḥadīth. His fame spread far and wide. He authored numerous works, among them Taysīr al-Wuṣūl ilā Jāmiʿ al-Uṣūl, which he abridged in an excellent manner. Students circulated it and benefited from it.”

== Works ==
Ibn al-Daybaʿ was a prolific author whose writings span ḥadīth sciences, history, Sīrah, jurisprudence, poetry and Islamic related fields. His following works include:

=== Hadith ===
- Taysīr al-Wuṣūl ilā Jāmiʿ al-Uṣūl min Ḥadīth al-Rasūl — A well-known and widely read summary of Majd ad-Dīn Ibn Athīr's Jāmiʿ al-Uṣūl fī Aḥādīth al-Rasūl (d. 606/1209). That collection brought together hadith from the six canonical sources: Ṣaḥīḥ al-Bukhārī, Ṣaḥīḥ Muslim, al-Muwaṭṭaʾ of Mālik, Sunan Abī Dāwūd, Sunan al-Tirmidhī, and Sunan al-Nasāʾī. Earlier scholars such as Ibn al-Barīzī (d. 738/1337) also produced abridgments, but Ibn al-Daybaʿ distinguished his by reorganizing the material for easier use. The book was printed and spread globally, with a well-known revised edition by Muḥammad Ḥāmid al-Faqī of al-Azhar.
- Tamyīz al-Ṭayyib min al-Khabīth mimmā yadūr ʿalā al-alsinah min al-ḥadīth — Abridgment of his teacher al-Sakhāwī's al-Maqāṣid al-Ḥasanah. He produced this summary to make the complex content more accessible to students and the general public. Additionally, in his treatise "Tamyīz al-Ṭayyib min al-Khabīth", Ibn al-Dayba' aimed to provide a verification text that clarifies and sifts out sayings wrongfully attributed to the Prophet.
- Miṣbāḥ Mishkāt al-Anwār min Ṣiḥāḥ Aḥādīth al-Nabī al-Mukhtār — A condensation of al-Khaṭīb al-Tabrīzī's Mishkāt al-Maṣābīḥ, itself is an expanded and revised version of al-Baghawī's Maṣābīḥ as-Sunnah. It was published with critical editing by Dr. ʿAlī Ḥasan al-Bawwāb.
- Tanqīḥ al-Wuṣūl wa-Jāmiʿ al-Uṣūl li-Aḥādīth al-Rasūl — Mentioned by Ismāʿīl Pasha in Hidāyat al-ʿĀrifīn as Ibn al-Daybaʿ's work, though not confirmed in earlier biographies. It may have been another summary of Taysīr al-Wuṣūl. No known manuscript has yet surfaced.
- Al-Aḥādīth al-Qudsiyyah — A collection of about 80 hadith qudsī, transmitted without chains or indications of authenticity. Later scholars such as Dr. Yūsuf Ṣādiq attempted takhrīj on some of them. Manuscripts exist in the Great Mosque Library of Ṣanʿāʾ (997 AH) and in the Ahqāf Library of Tarīm.
- Ghāyat al-Maṭlūb wa-Aʿẓam al-Minah fīmā yaghfir Allāh bihi al-dhunūb wa-yūjib al-Jannah — Written during the lifetime of his teacher, Zayn al-Dīn Aḥmad ibn ʿAbd al-Laṭīf al-Sharjī, who trained him in writing and composition. Edited by Dr. Riḍā Muḥammad Ṣafī al-Dīn al-Sanūsī and published in Beirut (1998).
- Kitāb al-Awāʾil — A compilation of “first” hadith reports, which scholars traditionally recited to teachers at the beginning of study to establish isnād connections. Survives only in manuscript form.
- Al-Taʾyīd Mukhtaṣar al-Taqyīd fī Ruwāt al-Sunan wa'l-Masānīd — Cited by the Yemeni bibliographer ʿAbd Allāh al-Ḥabshī. Appears to be a shortened version of works on narrators of the Sunan and Musnads.
- Asānīd al-Daybaʿ ʿan Shaykhihi al-Sharjī ʿan Nafīs al-Dīn al-ʿAlawī — A ten-folio collection of isnāds, half relating to the Kitāb al-Sunnah. A manuscript is preserved in the Western Library of Ṣanʿāʾ.
- Tashīl al-Murtaqā li-tanāwul al-Muntaqā — Mentioned by al-Ḥabshī, apparently an abridgment of Ibn Taymiyyah's al-Muntaqā fī Aḥādīth al-Aḥkām.
- Muʿjam al-Ḥāfiẓ ʿAbd al-Raḥmān Ibn al-Daybaʿ — Listed by al-Ḥabshī, possibly identical with his Asānīd collection noted above. Needs further study to determine if they are separate works.
- Tuhfat al-Zamān bi Faḍāʾil al-Yaman wa Ahluh — A short treatise in three chapters compiling Prophetic traditions on the virtues of Yemen and its people. It was published in Beirut (Dar al-Kotob al-'Ilmiyya, 1992), edited by Sayyid Kasrawī Ḥasan under the title Tuhfat al-Zamān fī Faḍāʾil Ahl al-Yaman.

=== History ===
- Bughyat al-Mustafīd fī Akhbār Madīnat Zabīd, also known as Tarikh al-Zabid — His most famous history work, focused on the city of Zabīd. This work is especially valuable for the information on the architecture, noble figures and scholars.
- Al-Faḍl al-Mazīd ʿalā Bughyat al-Mustafīd — A continuation of the above, recording events and deaths of scholars from 1495–1517 CE, covering the end of the Ṭāhirid dynasty and Mamlūk entry into Yemen. Published in multiple editions, including Yemen (1993) and Kuwait.
- Qurrat al-ʿUyūn bi-Akhbār al-Yaman al-Maymūn — A general history of Yemen from the early Islamic period through his own time. Based on al-Khazrajī’s al-ʿIqd al-Masbūk, with additions on the Rasūlid and Ṭāhirid dynasties. Published in several editions, including one by Muḥammad ʿAlī al-Akwaʿ.
- Al-ʿIqd al-Bāhir fī Tārīkh Dawlat Banī Ṭāhir — A focused account of the Ṭāhirid rulers, prepared for Sultan ʿĀmir ibn ʿAbd al-Wahhāb. Considered a lost work, though al-Ḥabshī reported a manuscript in the Great Mosque Library of Ṣanʿāʾ (no. 115).
- Tārīkh al-Dawlatayn al-Nāṣiriyyah wa’l-Ẓāhiriyyah wa-mā baynahumā — Covers the reigns of Yemeni rulers al-Nāṣir ibn al-Ashraf (1400–1423), al-Manṣūr II (1423–1426), al-Ashrāf III Ismāʿīl (1426–1427), and al-Ẓāhir Yaḥyā ibn al-Ashrāf II (1427–1438).
- Mukhtaṣar al-ʿAṭāyā al-Sunniyyah — A condensed version of al-ʿAṭāyā al-Sunniyyah wa al-Mawāhib al-Haniyyah fī al-Manāqib al-Yamaniyyah by al-Malik al-Afḍal ʿAbbās ibn ʿAlī ibn Dāwūd al-Mujāhid al-Rasūlī (764–778H / 1363–1376M). Ibn al-Daybaʿ's summary preserves accounts of companions, scholars, saints, and ministers who came to Yemen. The work is organized alphabetically for easier reference.

=== Sīrah ===
- Mawlid al-Dayba'i — Abd al-Rahman al-Zabidi famously compiled Mawlid al-Dayba'i, a work of poetry that eulogizes and praises (Salawat) the Islamic prophet Muhammad. The poem begins with the birth of Muhammad and continues into describing exemplary events in his life, with other figures like Husayn ibn Ali occasionally being mentioned. The Mawlid al-Dayba'i is usually recited aloud during celebrations of Milad Nabi in the Islamic month of Rabi' al-Awwal. The Mawlid al-Dayba'i is popular in Southeast Asian countries such as Indonesia. It has also become a tradition in Masjid Al-Abdul Razak, a Singaporean mosque.
- Ithāf al-Labīb bi-Isrāʾ al-Ḥabīb, also known called Kitāb al-Miʿrāj — This short treatise covers the Prophet's Night Journey (isrāʾ) and Ascension (miʿrāj). Qāṭin records the title as Ithāf al-Labīb bi-Isrāʾ al-Ḥabīb, whereas al-ʿAydarūs and Ibn al-ʿImād refer to it as Kitāb al-Miʿrāj. According to ʿAbd Allāh ibn Muḥammad al-Ḥabshī, a manuscript copy exists in the Maktabah al-Gharbiyyah in |Ṣanʿāʾ, although it has not yet been published.
- Tuhfat al-Azkiyāʾ li-Mawlid Khātam al-Anbiyāʾ — Mentioned by the Yemeni researcher ʿAbd Allāh ibn Muḥammad al-Ḥabshī, this work commemorates the birth of the Prophet Muhammad (Mawlid), highlighting its religious significance.
- Al-Tuhfah al-Laṭīfah fī ḥādithat al-biʿthah al-sharīfah — A short didactic poem recounting the major events of the Prophet's life, preserved in manuscripts and printed in a critical edition by Dār al-Bashāʾir (2006).

=== Other literary works ===
- Kashf al-Kurbah fī Sharḥ Duʿāʾ al-Imām Abī Hirbah — This is a commentary on the khatm al-Qurʾān supplication composed by Imām Muḥammad ibn Yaʿqūb Abī Hirbah. Ibn al-Daybaʿ stated that he wrote it after returning from his third pilgrimage in 896H/1491M. Radhi Daghfus listed it among his lost works, but this was incorrect. Manuscripts of the book survive in the Library of al-Aḥqāf (Tarim, Ḥaḍramawt) and in the private collection of Aḥmad ʿAbd al-Jalīl al-Ghāzī (Zabīd).
- Ghāyat al-Waṭar fī Adhkār al-Safar — Cited by Dr. Aḥmad ʿAwwād al-Kubaysī, who listed it among Ibn al-Daybaʿ's works. It parallels Tuhfat al-Ikhwān of Shaykh Aḥmad Muḥammad Qāṭin.
- Muntaqā al-Durar al-Maknūn fī Gharāʾib al-Funūn — Mentioned by Yemeni researcher ʿAbd Allāh ibn Muḥammad al-Ḥabshī, though he provided no source. No surviving copy has been identified.
- Shifāʾ al-Fuʾād bi Sharḥ Banāt Suʿād — Also noted by al-Ḥabshī without citing a source. No manuscript has been located.
- Bughyat al-Irbah fī Maʿrifat Aḥkām al-Ḥisbah — A treatise on ḥisbah and comparative jurisprudence, drawing on the methods of al-Ghazālī and al-Māwardī. Edited by Dr. Ṭalāl ibn Jamīl al-Rifāʿī (Umm al-Qura University), who confirmed the manuscript dates to the 10th century AH and is in Ibn al-Daybaʿ’s own hand. It comprises eight folios, each with 25 lines. The work was published in 1423H/2002. Al-Rifāʿī noted the need for further investigation to confirm attribution and to search for additional copies.
- Mukhtaṣar Muntaqā al-ʿAsjād fī Ḥurūf Abjad — Briefly mentioned by al-Kubaysī in his study of Ibn al-Daybaʿ's al-Tuhfat al-Laṭīfah. Its content remains unknown.
- Al-Nuẓm al-Shāmil fī Aḥkām al-Manāzil fī ʿIlm al-Falak — Also cited by al-Kubaysī, who reported that a single folio is preserved in the Library of al-Ashāʿir (Zabīd, Yemen).

== See also ==
- List of Ash'aris

== Bibliography ==
- Askarov Abdurashid Murodjonovich (1 March 1984). "The Tāhirid Sultans of the Yemen (858–923/1454–1517) and their Historian Ibn al-Dayba". Journal of Semitic Studies. 29 (1). Oxford University Press: 141–154. doi:10.1093/jss/XXIX.1.141.
