= Sunan al-Daraqutni =

10th-century Islamic hadith collection

- Author: Al-Daraqutni
- Original title: سنن الدارقطني
- Language: Arabic
- Genre: Hadith collection

Sunan al-Daraqutni, (Arabic: سنن الدارقطني), is a book of Hadith (narrations of the Islamic Muhammad) collected by the Muhaddith (Hadith collector) Imam Al-Daraqutni (306 – 385 AH).

== Description ==
The reason for the collection of the book being under the category of Sunan was to collect practices of the Prophet Muhammad. The total number of Ahadith in this book are 4836 according to Al-Maktaba Al-Shamela. In this book al-Daraqutni collected Moudu (fabricated) and Da'if (weak in Narration) Hadiths, as well as Sahih (authentic traditions).

== Criticism ==
Many Hadiths collected by Imam al-Daraqutni in his book are Moudu' (Fabricated) and Da'if (weak in Narration). Muhadditheen (Hadith Collectors) agree that the mention of a hadith in a book doesn’t mean that it is allowed to be relied on it.

Comtemporary scholars mention opposing scholarly views regarding this book of Ahadith. Ibn Abd al-Hadi said the book recorded: "Weak and fabricated traditions", the opposing side argued that the book is a Sunan (collection of practices of the Prophet Muhammad) rather than a Sahih (collection of authentic ahadith), therefore it may include authentic, weak, or fabricated traditions. Imam Daraqutni's book is also mentioned among the rank of Ahadith books right under the rank of Kutub al-Sitta (six canonical books of Ahadith), while some scholars include this Sunan among the list of the six canonical books of Ahadith.

== Commentaries ==
Among those who have written commentaries on this hadith collection are:

- Sunan al-Daraqutni 6 VOLUMES (سُنَن الْدَّارَقُطْنِي + التَّعْلِيقْ المُغْنِي عَلَى الْدَّارَقُطْنِي) Commentary by Muhammad al-'Azim al-Abadi: Published: Mu'assassat al-Risalah ISBN 9782745109446| Beirut, Lebanon | Damascus/Beirut, in 2004

== See also ==
- List of Sunni books
- Kutub al-Sittah
