= Ibrahim ibn Ya'qub al-Juzajani =

9th-century Muslim hadith scholar

Al-Juzajani
- Title: Al-Hafiz

Personal life
- Born: around 796 CE/180 AH; Jowzjan
- Died: 872 CE/259 AH; Damascus
- Region: Middle Eastern Scholar
- Main interest: Hadith

Religious life
- Religion: Islam
- Denomination: Sunni
- Jurisprudence: Hanbali
- Creed: Athari

Muslim leader
- Influenced by: Ibn Ma'in, Ahmad ibn Hanbal, Ali ibn al-Madini, Ishaq Ibn Rahwayh
- Influenced: Abu Dawood, al-Tirmidhi, al-Nasa'i, Abu Hatim al-Razi

Abu Ishaq Ibrahim ibn Ya'qub ibn Ishaq al-Sa'di al-Juzajani (Arabic: أبو إسحاق إبراهيم بن يعقوب بن إسحاق السعدي الجوزجاني, born around 796 CE/180 AH – died 872 CE/259 AH) was a Muslim hadith scholar, one of the imams of al-jarh wa al-ta'deel and a student of Ahmad ibn Hanbal. Some of the hadith scholars who transmitted his narrations include Abu Dawood, al-Tirmidhi and al-Nasa'i.

== Biography ==
He was born and raised in Jowzjan (now a province in Afghanistan) but moved to Damascus where he lived until his death.

=== Teachers ===
Some of his notable teachers were: Ibn Ma'in, Ahmad ibn Hanbal, Ali ibn al-Madini, Ishaq Ibn Rahwayh, Abu Thawr al-Kalbi, Hafs ibn ‘Umar al-Hawdi, Husayn ibn ‘Ali al-Ju'fi, Sa'id ibn Abi Maryam, Sa'id ibn Mansoor, Musadad ibn Masrahad and Yazid ibn Haroon.

=== Students ===
The well-known students who took knowledge from him were: Abu Dawood, al-Tirmidhi, al-Nasa'i, Abu Hatim al-Razi, Abu Zur'ah al-Razi, Abu Zur'ah al-Dimashqi and al-Dulabi.

== Works ==
The following is a list of works by al-Juzajani:

- Aḥwāl al-rijāl (أحوال الرجال) also known as Al-Shajarah fī Aḥwāl al-rijāl (الشجرة في أحوال الرجال): Modern editors of Al-Juzajani's works believe that this book was also called Al-jarḥ wa-al-taʻdīl (الجرح والتعديل), Al-ḍuʻafāʼ (الضعفاء), Maʻrifat al-rijāl (معرفة الرجال ) or Al-mutarjam (المترجم) by early Islamic scholars.
- Imārāt al-Nubūwah (أمارت النبوة)
- Masāʼil al-Imām Aḥmad (مسائل الإمام أحمد)
- Al-Tārīkh (التاريخ)
