= Ishaq ibn Rahwayh =

Muslim jurist and theologian (c. 777–852)

Imam Ishaq ibn Rahuyah
- إِسْحَاق بْن رَاهُوْيَه
- Title: Shaykh al-Mashriq ('Shaykh of the East') - Sayyid al-Huffaz ('master of Memorizers') - Shāhanshāh al-Hadith ('King of Hadith')

Personal life
- Born: 161 AH / 777–778 CE Merv, Khorasan, Abbasid Caliphate
- Died: 14 Sha'ban 238 AH / 29 January 853 CE (aged 74-75) Nishapur, Khorasan, Tahirid Dynasty (De jure governate of Abbasid Caliphate)
- Children: Yaqub Ibn Ishaq; Muhammad Ibn Ishaq; Ali Ibn Ishaq
- Era: early Abbasid era
- Region: Khorasan
- Main interests: Jurisprudence; hadith; exegesis; theology
- Notable work: Al-Musnad

Religious life
- Religion: Islam
- Denomination: Sunni
- Jurisprudence: Independent
- Creed: Athari

Muslim leader
- Influenced by: Yahya ibn Sa'id al-Qattan; Abd Allah ibn al-Mubarak; Sufyan ibn Uyayna; al-Shafi'i
- Influenced: Muhammad al-Bukhari; Muslim ibn al-Hajjaj; Ibn Khuzayma; al-Darimi; al-Nasa'i; Dawud al-Zahiri
- Arabic name
- Personal (Ism): Isḥāq إسحاق
- Patronymic (Nasab): bin Ibrahim bin Makhlad bin Rahwayh بن إبراهيم بن مخلد بن راهويه
- Teknonymic (Kunya): Abū Yaʿqūb أَبُو يَعْقُوب
- Toponymic (Nisba): Al-Ḥanẓalī al-Marwazi ٱلْحَنْظَلِيّ المَرْوَزِيّ

Ishaq bin Ibrahim bin Makhlad bin Rahwayh Abu Ya'qub al-Hanzali al-Marwazi (Arabic: إسحاق بن إبراهيم بن مخلد بن راهويه أبو يعقوب الهَنْظَليّ المَرْوَزِيّ, 777-778 - 855 CE) commonly known as Ishaq ibn Rahwayh (Note: Can be pronounced as [/ʔɪsˤħaːq bɪn raːhuːjːah/] or [/ʔɪsˤħaːq bɪn raːhwijah/].) (romanizated: Ishāq ibn Rāhawayh) was a Sunni Muslim scholar, jurist, muhaddith, exegete, and theologian. A close friend of Ahmad ibn Hanbal, he accompanied him on his travels to seek knowledge, and he was also a teacher of Bukhari and inspired him to compile the Sahih al-Bukhari. Among his only surviving work is al-Musnad, a hadith collection arranged by Companion narrators.

== Lineage ==
Ishaq belonged to the Adnanite tribe of Banu Tamim. His full lineage is recorded as:

Isḥāq ibn Abī al-Ḥasan Ibrāhīm ibn Mukhlad ibn Ibrāhīm ibn ʿAbd Allāh ibn Maṭar ibn ʿUbayd Allāh ibn Ghālib ibn ʿAbd al-Wārith ibn ʿUbayd Allāh ibn ʿAṭiyyah ibn Murrah ibn Kaʿb ibn Hammām ibn Asad ibn Murrah ibn ʿAmr ibn Ḥanẓalah ibn Mālik ibn Zayd Manāt ibn Tamīm ibn Murrah al-Ḥanẓalī al-Marwazī.

== Origins of the name ==
There has long been confusion surrounding his name. Ibn al-Sam'ani stated that his name should read as 'Rahuwayh', but that he was called 'Rahawayh', seemingly because of the difficulty of the ḍammah on the letter ha’. Ibn Khallikan, on the other hand, proposes 'Rahwayh' and 'Rahuya'.

Various stories also surround the origins of his name. In a report, the Tahirid governor Abdallah ibn Tahir demanded an explanation from Ishaq about the genesis of his name. Ishaq went on to explain that his father was born whilst travelling and this is how he came to acquire the epithet 'Rahuwi'.

Ibn Khallikan gives a different version of a similar story. Ishaq's father was born on the road to Mecca. In Persian, the word for road is "rāh", and "wayh" means to find, thus it means 'the one found on the road'. "Ibn Rāhwayh" remained a laqab of his descendants.

== Biography ==
Ishaq ibn Rahwayh was born in Merv, present-day Mary, Turkmenistan, in the year 161 AH / 777–778 CE. He began his studies in Khorasan and then set off on his journey at the age of thirteen. He is reported to have studied in the Hijaz, Yemen, Syria, and reached Iraq in 800 CE. He frequently travelled to Baghdad before settling permanently in Nishapur, where he spent the rest of his life until his death.

Among his most notable teachers are the traditionists Abd Allah ibn al-Mubarak (d. 797) in Khorasan, Ibn 'Ulayya (d. 809) and Sufyan ibn ʽUyaynah (d. 814) in the Hijaz, and Waki' ibn al-Jarrah (d. 812) and Yahya ibn Adam (d. 818) in Iraq. He was also a contemporary and close colleague of Ahmad Ibn Hanbal and a teacher of Bukhari, Muslim, Abu Dawud, Tirmidhi, and Nasa'i.

Ibn Rāhwayh was regarded as one of the foremost scholars of his era. He also used to issue Fatwas (legal verdicts). During his residence in Iraq, he became one of Ahmad Ibn Hanbal's closest companions. He reportedly memorized seventy thousand hadith by heart. His teachings developed into a Sunni legal school, which doesn't survive today.

Being a traditionalist, he was hostile to Ahl al-Ra'y. According to Ibn Qutaybah, Ishaq believed that the Ahl al-Ra'y "abandoned the Quran and Prophetic Sunnah and adhered to qiyas (analogy)," which led them to contradictions and absurdities.

== Appearance ==
He is reported to dye his beard with Henna.

== Influence ==
Ishaq arguably became the most influential of all Bukhari's teachers and influenced him to compile Sahih al-Bukhari.

Bukhari narrates:

"We were with Ishaq Ibn Rahwayh, who said, "If only you would compile a book of only authentic narrations of the Prophet." This suggestion remained in my heart, so I began compiling the Sahih."

== Works ==
The following works are listed in Ibn al-Nadim's Fihrist:

- Al-Musnad (كتاب المسند) – A hadith collection arranged in Musnad format ( by the names of Companions).
- The Book of Sunan in Fiqh (كتاب السنن في الفقه) – A legal work on jurisprudence; now lost.
- The Book of Tafsir (كتاب التفسير) – A Quranic exegesis; also lost.

== Death ==
He died on 14th of Sha'ban 238 AH / 29 January 853 CE. Many people wrote Elegies to mourn for his death. His grave was known and visited until at least 10th century.

== Sources ==
- Melchert, Christopher (1997). "Chapter 1: The Traditionalists of Iraq". The Formation of the Sunni Schools of Law, 9th-10th Centuries C.E. Koninklijke Brill, Leiden, The Netherlands: Brill Publishers. ISBN 90-04-10952-8.
- Ibn Khallikān (1994). Wafayāt al-Aʿyān wa-Anbāʾ Abnāʾ al-Zamān (in Arabic). Vol. 1. Beirut: Dār Ṣādir.
- Khan, Ahmad (2023). Heresy and the Formation of Medieval Islamic Orthodoxy: The Making of Sunnism, from the Eighth to the Eleventh Century. Cambridge University Press.
- Thomann, Johannes (2020). "From Serial Access to Random Access: Tables of Contents, Chapter Headings and Hierarchical Text Structures in Fourth/Tenth-century Scientific Books". Journal of Abbasid Studies. 7 (2): 207–228. doi:10.1163/22142371-12340056.
- al-Dhahabi (2006). Siyar Aʿlām al-Nubalāʾ (in Arabic). Vol. 9. Cairo, Egypt: Dār al-Ḥadīth.
- Ṣiddīq Ḥasan Khān (2007). al-Tāj al-Mukallal min Jawāhir Maʾāthir al-Ṭirāz al-Ākhir wa-al-Awwal (in Arabic) (1st ed.). Qatar: Ministry of Endowments and Islamic Affairs.
- Spectorsky, Susan (2001). "Ḥadīth in the Responses of Isḥāq b. Rāhwayh". Islamic Law and Society. 8 (3). Leiden: Brill. doi:10.1163/156851901317230648. JSTOR 3399451.
- Schacht, Joseph (2012). "Ibn Rāhwayh". In P. Bearman (ed.). Encyclopaedia of Islam, Second Edition. Brill. doi:10.1163/1573-3912_islam_SIM_3329.
- Lucas, Scott C. (2011). "Sunnism, Sunnis". In J. Mbiti (ed.). The Encyclopedia of Christianity. Brill. doi:10.1163/2211-2685_eco_SI.100.
- Osman, Amr (2014). The Ẓāhirī Madhhab (3rd/9th-10th/16th Century). Studies in Islamic Law and Society, Volume: 38. Leiden, Netherlands: Brill. doi:10.1163/9789004279650_005. ISBN 9789004279650. OCLC 893668889.
- Pakatchi, Ahmad; Gholami, Rahim (2021). "al-Bukhārī, Muḥammad". In W. Madelung and F. Daftary (ed.). Encyclopaedia Islamica. Brill. doi:10.1163/1875-9831_isla_COM_05000023.
- Fadel, Mohammad (1995). "Ibn Ḥajar's Hady al-Sārī: A Medieval Interpretation of the Structure of al-Bukhārī's al-Jāmiʿ al-Ṣaḥīḥ: Introduction and Translation". Journal of Near Eastern Studies. 54 (3). The University of Chicago Press: 161–197. doi:10.1086/373755. JSTOR 546299.
- Ibn Ḥajar al-ʿAsqalānī (1996). Tahdhīb al-Tahdhīb (in Arabic). Vol. 1 (1st ed.). Beirut, Lebanon: Dār al-Maʿrifah.
- al-Nadīm (2014). Al-Fihrist (in Arabic). Vol. 2 (2nd ed.). London: Al-Furqan Islamic Heritage Foundation.
- Ibn Hibban (1973). al-Thiqāt (in Arabic). Vol. 8 (1st ed.). Hyderabad Deccan, India: Dāʾirat al-Maʿārif al-ʿUthmānīyah.
