= Masjid Al-Abdul Razak =

Mosque located in Kembangan, Singapore

- Jawi: مسجد العبد الرزاق
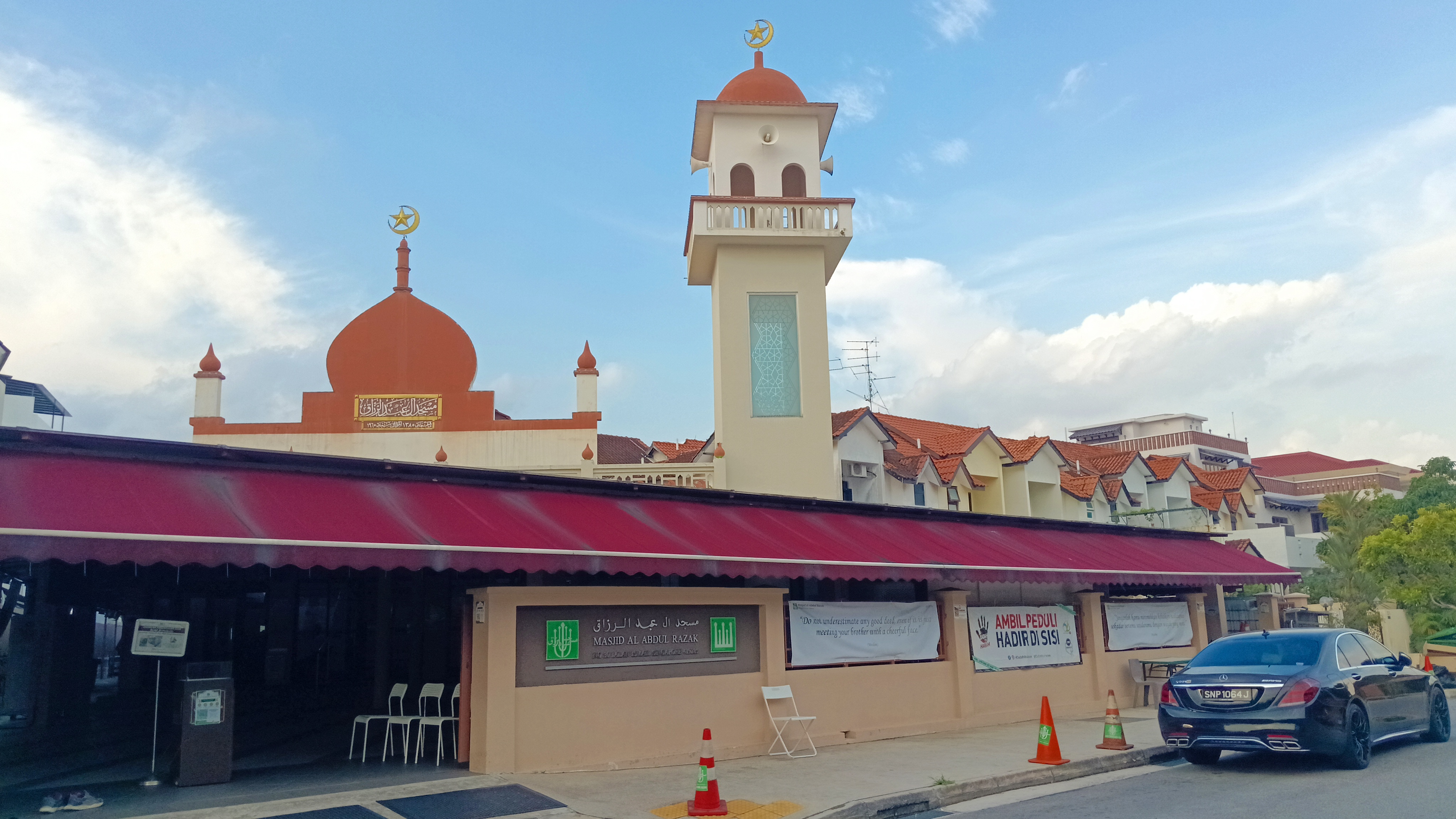

- Location in Singapore

Religion
- Affiliation: Sunni Islam

Location
- Location: 30 Jalan Ismail, Singapore 419285
- Country: Singapore
- Interactive map of Masjid Al-Abdul Razak
- Coordinates: 1.3233071°N 103.9072963°E

Architecture
- Type: Mosque
- Style: Islamic architecture
- Founder: Yūsuf al-ʿAbdulrazāk
- Completed: 1965
- Minaret: 1

Masjid Al-Abdul Razak is a mosque located in Kembangan, Singapore. Built in 1965, it is situated along the Jalan Ismail road within the residential enclave of landed properties in Kembangan. It was formerly a male-only mosque due to its limited capacity until it was expanded in 2000, with a further reconstruction following up in 2009.

== History ==
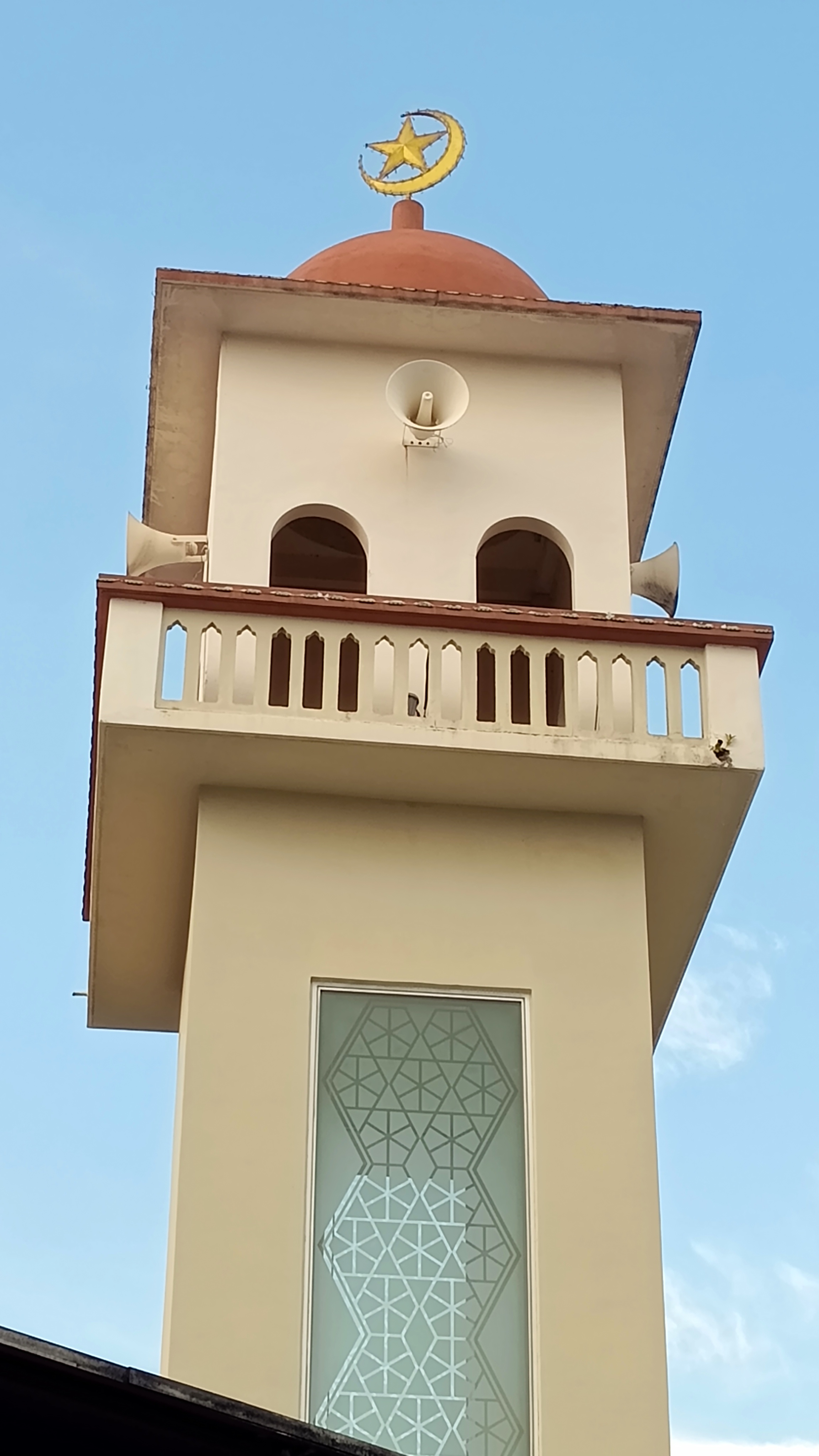
The minaret of Masjid Al-Abdul Razak, a rectangular pillar with a dome atop it.

The mosque was built in 1965 by Yūsuf ibn ʿAbd al-Laṭīf al-ʿAbdulrazāk, an Arab businessman from Kuwait who had settled temporarily in Singapore. Yusof Ishak, the first President of Singapore, officially declared the mosque to be open at its inauguration ceremony on 31 March 1966. By 1972, the ownership and management of the mosque fell under the purview of the Majlis Ugama Islam Singapura (MUIS). Scholars from Yemen, especially from the Ba'alawi clan, would give lectures and sermons at the mosque, which led to the mosque being nicknamed Masjid Pillihan Ulama (Malay for "Mosque Chosen by Scholars") in advertisements and promotional materials.

The mosque was formerly exclusively open to only male worshippers, due to a lack of space for female worshippers, until 2000 when a small musalla and female sanitary facilities were added to the back of the mosque. A further renovation campaign to expand the main prayer hall was also announced on 18 February 2008. The mosque was reinaugurated on 27 June 2009 after extensive reconstruction works had been carried out in the main building.

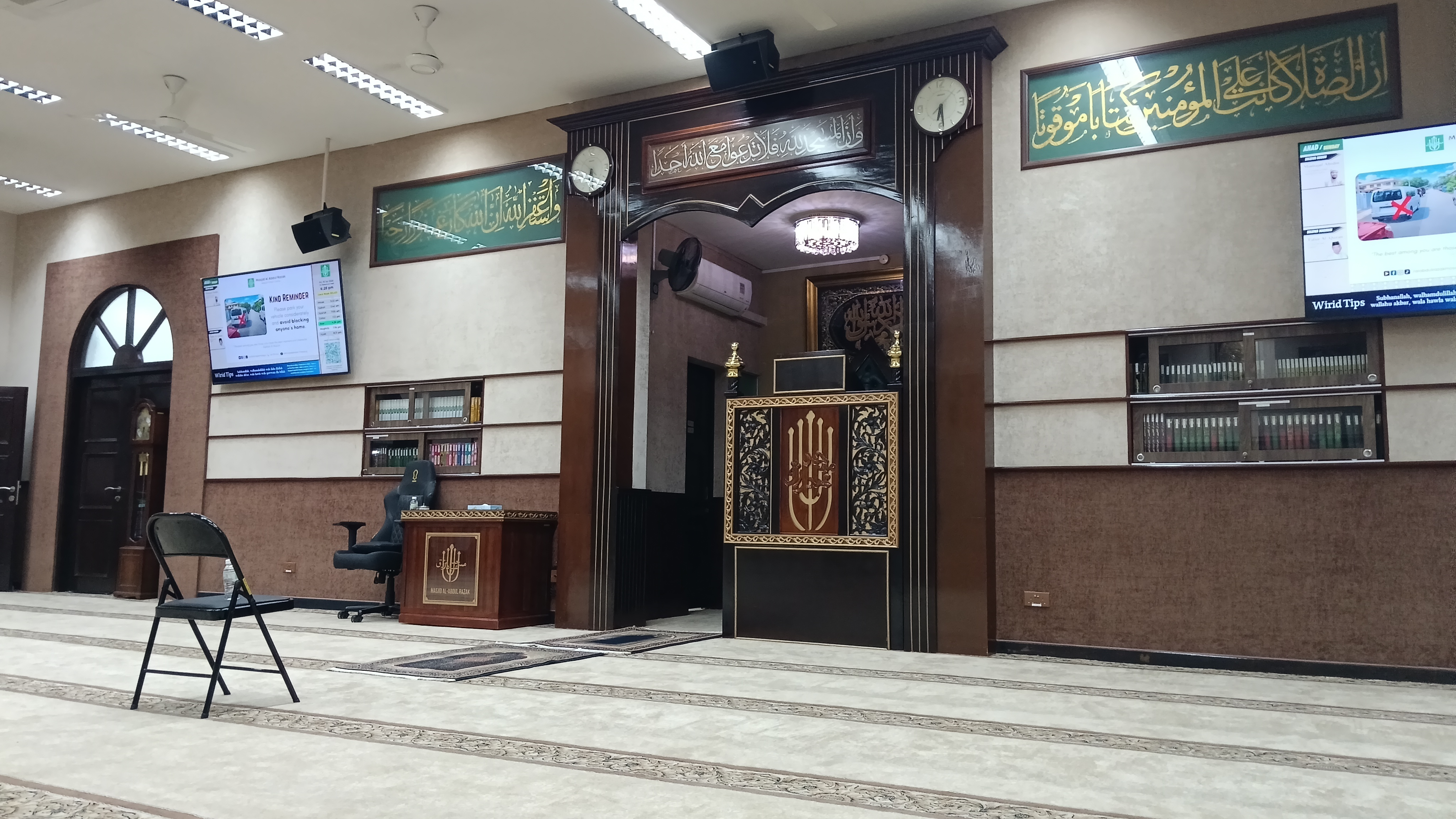
Interior of the mosque.

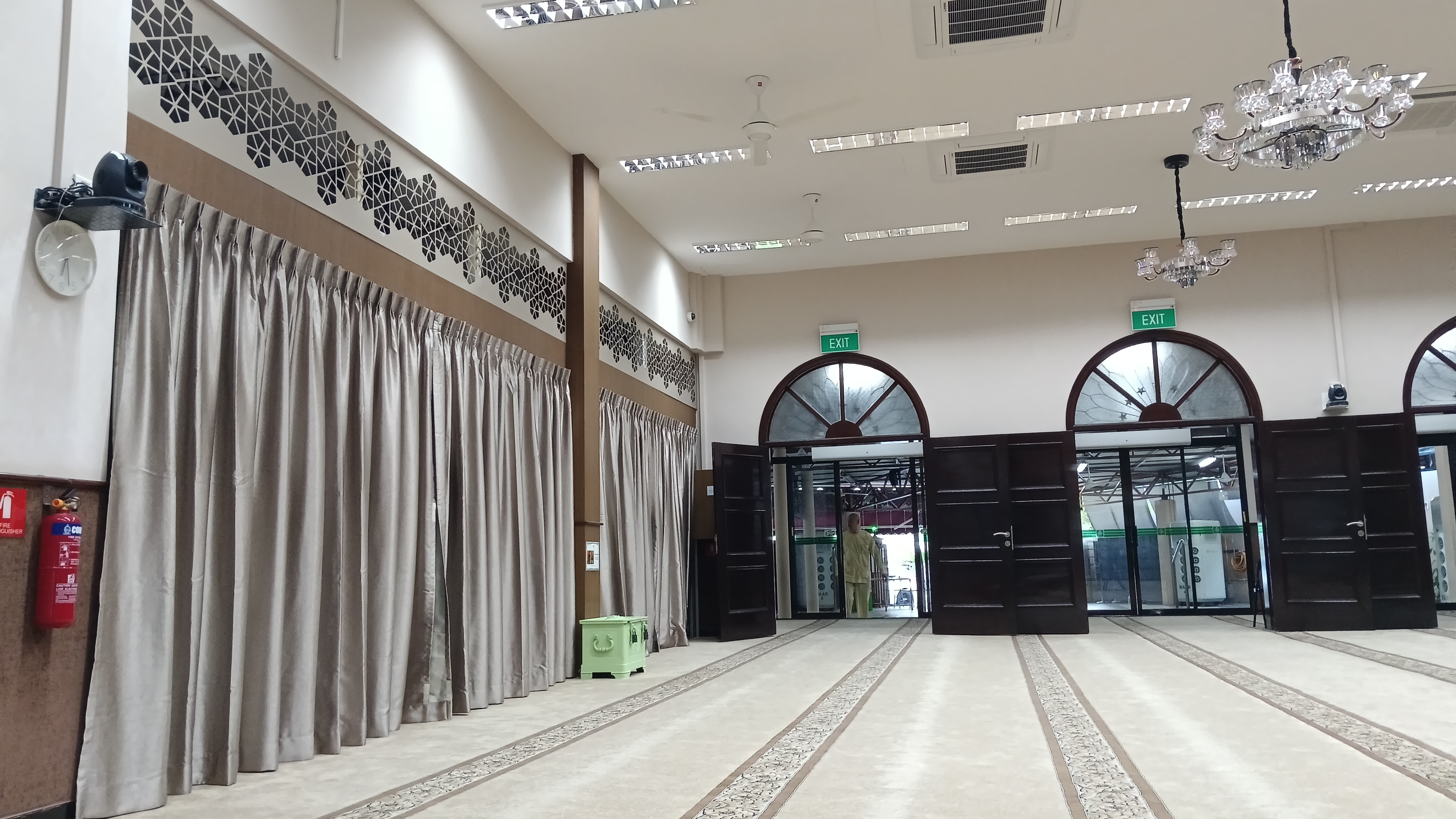
The women's section in the mosque was only added in the year 2000.

Volunteers from Shinnyo-en assisted in helping to divert the heavy traffic outside the mosque during the Eid al-Fitr prayers in 2019, allowing for worshippers to pray on the road when the mosque had reached its maximum capacity. Later in 2023, the video and audio systems in the mosque were upgraded by local video company, Datavideo.

== Cultural significance ==
The mosque holds cultural and religious significance in the country for its tradition of hosting recitals of Mawlid al-Dayba'i. This form of Mawlid is a poetry composed by the Yemeni scholar, Ibn al-Dayba', which details the life of the Islamic prophet Muhammad and includes praises of his companions, as well as praises dedicated to his family members such as al-Husayn ibn Ali. The topic of Mawlid itself is a heavily disputed topic, with Islamic scholars such as Anwar Shah Kashmiri discouraging it, and others such as Muhammad al-Alawi al-Maliki permitting it. Regardless, the festival of Mawlid is a commonly celebrated event in Singapore.

== Transportation ==
The nearest form of transport to Masjid Al-Abdul Razak is the bus stop for Eunos Crescent Block 16. The nearest MRT station to Masjid Al-Abdul Razak is the Eunos MRT station on the East–West MRT line.

== See also ==
- Islam in Singapore
- List of mosques in Singapore
