= Ibn 'Ulayya =

8th-century Islamic scholar

- Title: Al-Hafiz

Personal life
- Born: c. 729 CE; Basra, Umayyad caliphate (present-day Iraq)
- Died: c. 809 CE; Baghdad, Abbasid caliphate (present-day Iraq)
- Era: Islamic Golden Age
- Main interest(s): Hadith, Faqih

Religious life
- Religion: Sunni Islam

Senior posting
- Influenced: Ishaq Ibn Rahwayh

Abu Bishr Isma'il ibn Ibrahim ibn Muqsim (Arabic: أبو بشر إسماعيل بن إبراهيم بن مِقْسَم ;729 – 809 CE), commonly known as Ibn 'Ulayya (Arabic: ابن عُليَّة), was a hadith scholar, faqih and a mufti from Basra. During the reign of Harun ar-Rashid, he was tax collector and later judge in Basra, where he died in 193 H (809 AD).

== Background ==
Ibn Ulayya belonged to a family of scholars, all of whom were known as Ibn Ulayya. His grandfather, Muqsim, was a Zutt from the Kingdom of Kaikan in what is Balochistan, and was a mawali of Abdur Rehman ibn Qutba al-Asdi. His father, Ibrahim ibn Muqsim, was a merchant in Kufa. He had married Ulayya bint Hasan, who was a wise and learned lady from Basra. Due to her piety, her descendants came to be known by her name. Ibn Ulayya was born to Ibrahim in 110 H (729 AD).

== Career ==
One of the most eminent Basran scholars, Ibn Ulayya was hailed by every traditionist who knew him. His pupil included such prominent scholars as al-Shafi'i, Shu'ba Ibn al-Ḥajjāj, Yahya ibn Ma'in and Ali ibn al-Madini. Imam Ahmad ibn Hanbal too attended his lectures during last ten years of his life, whenever Ibn Hunbal was in Baghdad. However, Ibn Ulayya was one of the theologians (ashāb al-ra'y) instead of the traditionists (ashāb al-sunna), and he is reported to have expressed negative views about the traditionists.

His son, Ibrahim ibn Ulayya (died 833), was also a famous scholar. He eventually settled in Egypt, where his ideas remained prominent throughout 9th century. Although Ibrahim ibn Ulayya was a rationalist, he did not display any clear relation with then dominant Mu'tazalite thought. He held the view that Qur'an was created and is considered one of the earliest proponents of the theory of consent (known as ijma) in Islam.
