= Abdul-Qadir al-Arna'ut =

Albanian Islamic cleric (1928–2004)

- عبد القادر الأرناؤوط
- Born: 1928; Istog, Kosovo
- Died: November 26, 2004 (aged 75–76); Damascus, Syria
- Occupation: Islamic scholar

Abdul-Qadir al-Arna'ut (Arabic: عبد القادر الأرناؤوط Albanian: Abdul Kadër Arnauti, 1928–26 November 2004), born Kadri Sokoli was an Albanian Islamic scholar who specialised in the fields of hadith and fiqh.

== Biography ==
Born into a Muslim Albanian family in Istog on the year 1928, which was a part of Yugoslavia but now is located in modern day Kosovo. His family spoke in the local Gheg dialect of the Albanian language. His family migrated to Syria after his birth due to persecution from the Yugoslavian government. His known name as Arnaout comes from the Turkish word for Albanian which is used all over the Middle East. Arnaout received his initial religious training with Hanafi scholars, before breaking with them to continue his quest for knowledge through self-teaching.

The Ba'ath government banned al-Arna'ut from giving lectures and teaching. Al-Arna'ut died on 26 November 2004 in Damascus under quasi-house arrest and without leaving a successor. His funeral prayer was held after the Jumu'ah prayer at the Zayn al-'Abidin mosque in al-Maydan, Damascus, and was attended by tens of thousands of people. He was 76 years old.

== Works ==
One of his most significant projects was editing and verifying Jami' al-Usul, a massive Hadith compendium authored by Majd al-Dīn ibn al-Athir.

== See also ==
- Al-Albani
- Shu'ayb al-Arna'ut
