= Sahih Muslim =

Second hadith collection of the Six Books of Sunni Islam

Ṣaḥīḥ Muslim
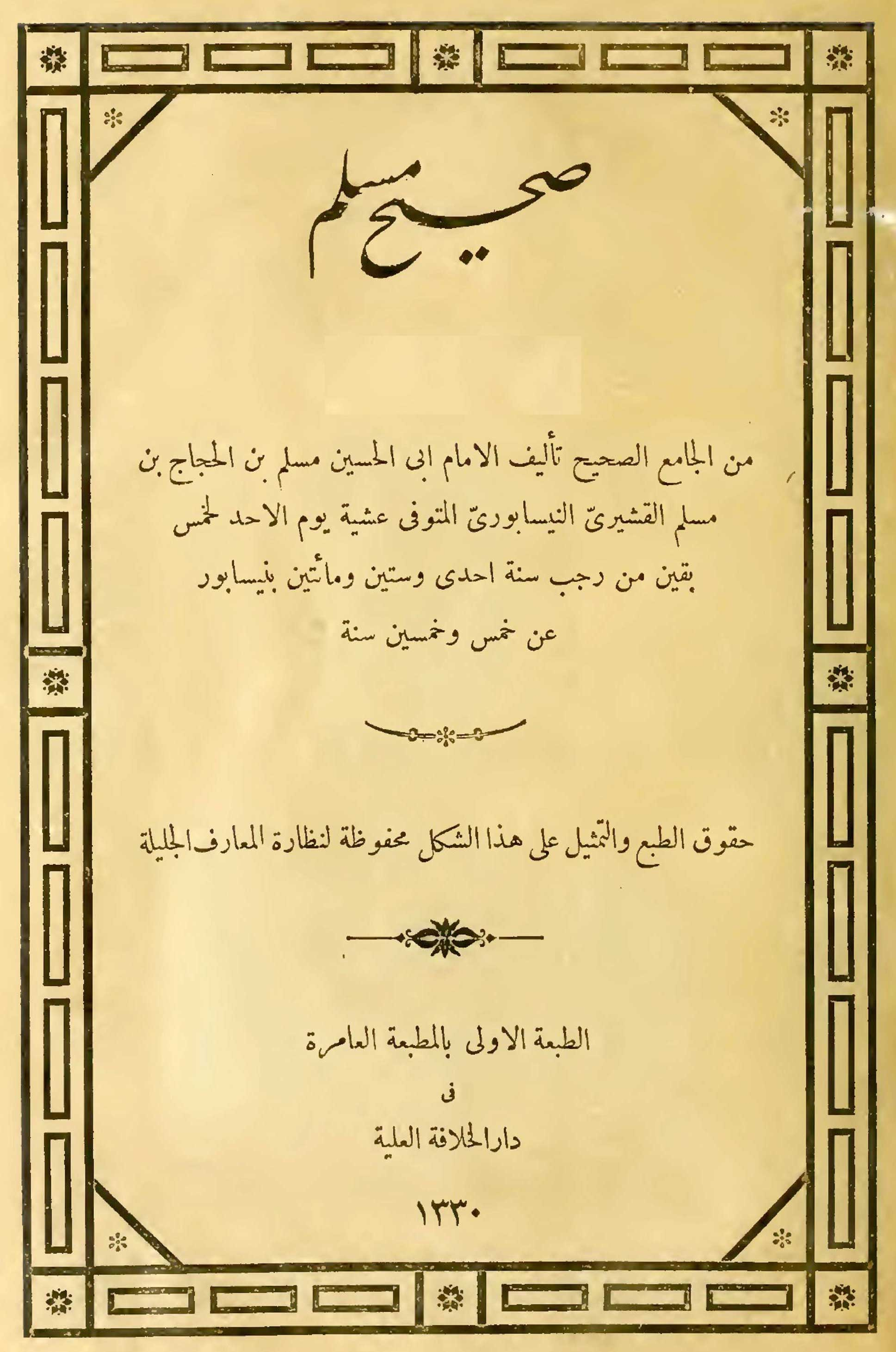
- copy of Sahih Muslim from 1910
- Author: Muslim ibn al-Ḥajjāj (c. 822–875)
- Language: Arabic, Persian
- Series: Kutub al-Sittah
- Genre: Hadith collection
- Published: 9th century
- Original text: Ṣaḥīḥ Muslim at Arabic Wikisource

Sahih Muslim (Arabic: صحيح مسلم, romanized: Ṣaḥīḥ Muslim) is the second hadith collection of the Six Books of Sunni Islam. Compiled by Islamic scholar Muslim ibn al-Ḥajjāj (d. 875) in the musannaf format, the work is valued by Sunnis, alongside Sahih al-Bukhari, as the most important source for Islamic religion after the Qur'an.

Sahih Muslim contains approximately 5,500 - 7,500 hadith narrations in its introduction and 56 books. Kâtip Çelebi (died 1657) and Siddiq Hasan Khan (died 1890) both counted 7,275 narrations. Muhammad Fuad Abdul Baqi wrote that there are 3,033 narrations without considering repetitions. Mashhur ibn Hasan Al Salman, a student of Albanian Islamic scholar Al-Albani (died 1999), counted 7,385 total narrations, which, combined with the ten in the introduction, add up to a total of 7,395. Muslim wrote an introduction to his collection of hadith, wherein he clarified the reasoning behind choosing the hadith he chose to include in his Sahih.

== Development ==
According to Al-Khatib al-Baghdadi, Muslim began writing the Sahih for Ahmad ibn Salamah an-Naysaburi. He was also compelled to write the Sahih for what he observed to be the poor character of his contemporary hadith scholars, and their unreluctant willingness to spread daʻīf (weak) narrations. Muslim collected 12,000 narrations and chose 4,000 to be included in his book.

He divided narrators of hadith into three tiers based on their memory and character:

- those who possessed authentic memory and were of perfect character, honest and trustworthy.
- those of slightly weaker memory and perfection, trustworthy, knowledgeable and honest.
- those whose honesty was disputed or was a subject of discussion.

Muslim did not include hadith which were narrated by those who belonged to the last tier. Moreover, Muslim only recorded hadith that were narrated to him by an unbroken isnad (chain) of narrators through two reliable tabi'un, each of which had to be narrated through two companions of Muhammad.

== Reception ==
Sunni Muslims regard Sahih Muslim as the second most important book of the Kutub al-Sittah. Sahih Muslim and Sahih al-Bukhari are together referred to as the Sahihayn (The Two Sahihs). In the Introduction to the Science of Hadith, Ibn al-Salah wrote: "The first to author a Sahih was Bukhari [...]", followed by Abū al-Ḥusayn Muslim ibn al-Ḥajjāj an-Naysābūrī al-Qushayrī, who was his student, sharing many of the same teachers. These two books are the most authentic books after the Quran. As for the statement of al-Shafi'i, who said, "I do not know of a book containing knowledge more correct than Malik's book [Muwatta Imam Malik]", [...] he said this before the books of Bukhari and Muslim. The book of Bukhari is the more authentic of the two and more useful.

Al-Nawawi wrote about Sahih al-Bukhari, "The scholars, may God have mercy on them, have agreed that the most authentic book after the dear Quran are the two Sahihs of Bukhari and Muslim." Siddiq Hasan Khan (died 1890) wrote, "All of the Salaf and Khalaf assert that the most authentic book after the book of Allah is Sahih al-Bukhari and then Sahih Muslim." This sentiment is echoed by both contemporary and past Islamic scholars, including Ibn Taymiyya (died 1328), Al-Maziri (died 1141), and Al-Juwayni (died 1085). Amin Ahsan Islahi praised the scientific arrangement of the narrations in Sahih Muslim. He also praised Muslim's particularity in highlighting differences in wording between two narrations, even when it came to a single letter that held no semantic significance, or if they differed about any facts relating to a narrator in the isnad.

Despite the book's reputation and the consensus of scholars that it is the second most authentic collection of hadith after Sahih al-Bukhari, it is agreed upon that this does not mean that every hadith in Sahih al-Bukhari is more valid than every hadith in Sahih Muslim, but that the total of what is contained in Sahih al-Bukhari is more valid than the total of what is contained in Sahih Muslim.

== Derived works ==
=== Commentaries ===
More than 60 commentaries have been written on Sahih Muslim, some of which are Siyānah Sahīh Muslim by Ibn al-Salah, of which only the beginning segment remains, Al-Mu'allim bi Fawā'id Muslim by Al-Maziri, Al Minhāj Sharḥ Sahīḥ Muslim by Al-Nawawi, Fath al-Mulhim bi-Sharh Sahih al-Imam Muslim by Shabbir Ahmad Usmani, Takmilah Fath al-Mulhim bi-Sharh Sahih al-Imam Muslim by Taqi Usmani, and Tafsir al-Gharīb mā fi al-Sahīhayn by Al-Humaydī. Translations of commentaries of Sahih Muslims are available in numerous languages.

== See also ==
- Muslim ibn al-Hajjaj – author of Sahih Muslim
- Sahih al-Bukhari – another Sahih collection of hadith narrations and the other of the Sahihayn
- Muhammad al-Bukhari – another hadith scholar, one of Muslim's teachers, and the author of Sahih al-Bukhari
- Kutub al-Sittah – six most highly-regarded collections of hadith in Sunni Islam, including Sahih al-Bukhari, Sahih Muslim, and:
  - Sahih al-Tirmidhi – compiled by Al-Tirmidhi (824–892)
  - Sunan ibn Majah – compiled by Ibn Majah (824–887)
  - Sunan Abu Dawood – compiled by Abu Dawud al-Sijistani (died 889)
  - Al-Sunan al-Sughra, also known as Sunan an-Nasa'i – compiled by Al-Nasa'i (829–915)
