= Al-Sunan al-Sughra =

9th-century collection of hadith by al-Nasa'i

Sunan al-Ṣughrā
- Author: Al-Nasa'i
- Original title: السنن الصغرى
- Language: Arabic
- Series: Kutub al-Sittah
- Genre: Hadith collection

Al-Sunan al-Sughra (Arabic: سنن الصغرى, romanized: Sunan al-Ṣughrā, lit. 'The Smaller [Collection] of Sunnahs'), also known as Sunan al-Nasa'i (Arabic: سنن النسائي, romanized: Sunan al-Nasāʾī), is one of the Kutub al-Sittah (six major hadith collections), and was collected by al-Nasa'i (214 – 303 AH; c. 829 – 915 CE).

== Description ==
Sunnis regard this collection as the third most important of their six major collections. Al-Mujtaba (English: the selected) has 5,758 hadiths, including repeated narrations, which the author selected from his larger work, As-Sunan al-Kubra. Within Kutub al-Sittah, it is considered the most authentic book of hadith (narrations of Muhammad) after the Sahihayn (Sahih al-Bukhari & Sahih Muslim) by most scholars of hadith.

== Views ==
According to al-Haafiz Ibn Hajar, the book of Sunan an-Nasa'i contains the fewest da‘eef (weak) hadiths and majrooh narrators among the six books after the Saheehain (Sahih al-Bukhari & Sahih Muslim), and there is not a single mawdhoo (fabricated) hadith in it.

It is claimed Sunan al-Sughra is "politically biased" towards Ali.

== Contents ==
Editor, Sayyid Kasrawī Hasan's 1991, Beirut publication, in 6 volumes, provides the standard topical classification of the hadith Arabic text.

The book contains 52 chapters.

1. Purification
2. Water
3. Menstruation and Istihadah
4. Ghusl and Tayammum
5. Salah
6. the Times (of Prayer)
7. the Adhan (The Call to Prayer)
8. the Masjids
9. the Qiblah
10. Leading the Prayer (Al-Imamah)
11. the Commencement of the Prayer
12. The At-Tatbiq (Clasping One's Hands Together)
13. Forgetfulness (In Prayer)
14. Jumu'ah (Friday Prayer)
15. Shortening the Prayer When Traveling
16. Eclipses
17. Praying for Rain (Al-Istisqa')
18. the Fear Prayer
19. the Prayer for the Two 'Eids
20. Qiyam Al-Lail (The Night Prayer) and Voluntary Prayers During the Day
21. Funerals
22. Fasting
23. Zakah
24. Hajj
25. Jihad
26. Marriage
27. Divorce
28. Horses, Races and Shooting
29. Endowments
30. Wills
31. Presents
32. Gifts
33. ar-Ruqba
34. 'Umra
35. Oaths and Vows
36. Agriculture
37. the Kind Treatment of Women
38. Fighting [The Prohibition of Bloodshed]
39. Distributionof Al-Fay'
40. al-Bay'ah
41. al-'Aqiqah
42. al-Fara' andal-'Atirah
43. Hunting and Slaughtering
44. ad-Dahaya (Sacrifices)
45. Financial Transactions
46. Oaths (qasamah), Retaliation and Blood Money
47. Cutting off the Hand of the Thief
48. Faith and its Signs
49. Adornment
50. the Etiquette of Judges
51. Seeking Refuge with Allah
52. Drinks

== Commentaries and translations ==
The book and its commentaries have been published by different publishers around the world :

- Kitab al-Sunan al-Kubra al-Nasa'i by Shaykh Shuaib Al Arna'ut & Shaykh al-Turki: Published by: al-Risalah al-'Alamiyyah | Damascus/Beirut, Syria/Lebanon in 2011.
- English Translation of Sunan An-Nasa'i (6 Books), Published by: Darussalam (2007)
- Sunan al-Nasa'i (6 vol Med) Arabic-English, Published by: Darussalam (2007)

=== Arabic commentaries & annotations ===
- Al-Imʿān fī Sharḥ an-Nasāʾī Abī ʿAbd ar-Raḥmān, by ʿAlī ibn ʿAbdillāh ibn Khalaf ibn Muḥammad ibn an-Niʿmah. Imām Dhahabī remarked, ‘He expanded it to the furthest extent.
- At-Taʿlīqāt as-Salafiyyah ʿalā Sunan an-Nasāʾī, by Shaykh Muḥammad ʿAṭāʾ Allah Ḥanīf al-Fūjyānī (d. 1407 AH). The author used four ḥawāshī (commentaries) on the Sunan: the ḥāshiyah (commentary) of Imām Suyūṭī and Imām Sindī, and the two newer ḥawāshī of Shaykh Finjābī and Shaykh Shāhjahānpūrī. It also includes the footnotes of Shaykh Ḥusayn al-Anṣārī. It was first published in Pakistan in one big volume, and later it was published in five volumes in 1418 AH/1997 CE. It is available online.
- Taysīr al-Yusrā bi Sharḥ al-Mujtabā min as-Sunan al-Kubrā, by ʿAbd ar-Raḥmān ibn Aḥmad al-Bahkalī al-Yamānī (d. 1248 AH). One manuscript of this work is available in the library of al-Jāmiʿ al-Kabīr in Ṣanʿā, Yemen. It contains four volumes starting from the Bāb Kayfa Furiḍat aṣ-Ṣalāh, until Bāb aṣ-Ṣawm. The numbers of the manuscripts of the four volumes are 287, 404, 280, and 243 qāf, respectively.
- At-Taqrīrāt ar-Rāʾiʿah ʿalā Sunan an-Nasāʾī, by Mawlānā Muḥammad Ḥamd Allāh at-Thanwī. It was published in India in 1319 AH in one huge volume.
- The taqrīrāt (oral commentary) of Shaykh Muḥammad ibn Jaʿfar al-Kattāni (d. 1345 AH). He has commented on most of the Six Books, and it includes Sunan an-Nasāʾī.
- The taʿlīqāt (footnotes) of Shaykh Ḥusayn ibn Muḥsin al-Anṣārī al-Yamānī (d. 1327 AH).
- Al-Ḥāshiyah al-Muḥammadiyyah ʿalā ’l-Akhbār an-Nasāʾiyyah, by Shaykh Muḥammad ibn Ḥamd Allāh at-Thānwī (d. 1296 AH). It has been published twice.
- The Ḥāshiyah of ʿAllāmah Sindī (d. 1138 AH).
- The Ḥāshiyah of ʿAllāmah Sindī published with the title, Ḥāshiyat as-Sindī ʿalā ’n-Nasāʾī, by Maktabah Maṭbūʿāt al-Islāmiyyah in Aleppo, Syria, in 1986 CE.
- The Ḥāshiyah of Imām Suyūṭī and Imām Sindī have also been compiled together by Abū ʿAbd ar-Raḥmān Muḥammad Panjābī and Muḥammad ʿAbd al-Laṭīf. It was published in Delhi in 1898 CE.
- Al-Ḥawāshī al-Jadīdah ʿalā Sunan an-Nasāʾī, by Shaykh Muḥammad al-Fanjābī ad-Dihlawī (d. 1315 AH) and Shaykh Muḥammad ibn Kifāyatullāh ash-Shāhjahānpūrī (d. 1338 AH).
- Dhakhīrat al-ʿUqbā fī Sharḥ al-Mujtabā, by Shaykh Muḥammad ibn ʿAlī ibn Ādam al-Ithyūbī (d. 1442 AH/2020 CE). This 42-volume collection is the most comprehensive commentary on the Sunan. It is useful from an ʿilal, ḥadīth, and lughah perspective. The profiles of narrators, which have lengthened the volume of the book, serve as a useful reference, generally removing the need to consult Tahdhīb al-Kamāl, Tahdhīb al-Tahdhīb, or Taqrīb al-Tahdhīb. The author quotes extensively from earlier sources which is useful, but this makes it a long read. This book is available online.
- Zahr ar-Rubāʾ ʿalā ’l-Mujtabā, by Imām Abū Bakr Jalāl ad-Dīn as-Suyūṭī (d. 911 AH). It is published with the title, Sharḥ as-Suyūṭī ʿalā Sunan an-Nasāʾī, by Maktabah Maṭbūʿāt al-Islāmiyyah in Aleppo, Syria in 1986 CE. It is usually found published as marginal notes in the Sunan.
- Rawḍ ar-Rubā ʿan Tarjamat al-Mujtabā, by Mawlānā Wahīd ad-Dīn al-Lacknawī. It was published in Lahore in 1886 CE with his translation in Hindi-Urdu.
- Sharḥ Sunan an-Nasāʾī, by Abū ’l-ʿAbbās Aḥmad ibn ʿAlī al-Walīd ibn Rushd (d. 563 AH).
- Sharḥ an-Nasāʾī, by Abū ’l-Ḥasan Muḥammad ibn ʿAlī al-Ḥusaynī. Hāfiẓ Ibn Ḥajar remarked, “I read with the writing of our Shaykh al-ʿIrāqī that he — al-Ḥusaynī — commenced in the writing of a commentary on Sunan an-Nasāʾī.’ I am unaware whether the author completed this work or not, and I have not come across its published version.”
- Sharḥ Sunan an-Nasāʾī, by Muḥammad ibn Aḥmad ibn Ayyūb al-Ḥimṣī al-ʿIṣyātī ash-Shāfiʿī (d. 834 AH).
- Sharḥ Sunan an-Nasāʾī, by Yaḥyā ibn al-Muṭahhir ibn Ismāʿīl al-Yamānī (d. 1268 AH). The author is from among the students of Imām Shawkānī.
- Sharḥ Sunan an-Nasāʾī, by Aḥmad ibn Zayd ibn ʿAbdillāh al-Kibsī al-Yamānī (d. 1271 AH).
- Sharḥ Sunan an-Nasāʾī, by Shaykh Muḥammad ibn ʿAbd ar-Raḥmān ibn Ḥasan al-Ahdal (d. 1352 AH).
- Sharḥ Sunan an-Nasāʾī, by Shaykh Muḥammad al-Mukhtār ibn Sīdī al-Jaknī ash-Shanqīṭī (d. 1405 AH). It was not completed so only five volumes of this work have been published.
- Sharḥ Zawāʾid Sunan an-Nasāʾī, by Imām Abū Ḥafṣ Sirāj ad-Dīn ʿUmar ibn ʿAlī, famously known as Ibn al-Mulaqqin (d. 804 AH). It is a commentary on the additional ḥadīths of Sunan an-Nasāʾī that are not present in the ṣaḥīḥayn. The author has also written commentaries on the rest of the Sunan compilations, and all of them are compiled in one volume. Hāfiẓ Ibn Ḥajar mentioned this in al-Majmaʿ al-Muʾassas Inbāʾ al-Ghumar and Dhayl ad-Durar al-Kāminah.
- ʿArf Zahr ar-Rubāʾ ʿalā ’l-Mujtabā, by ʿAlī ibn Sulayman ad-Dimantī al-Bujumʿawī al-Maghribī (d. 1306 AH). It is an abridgment of Imām Suyūṭī’s Zahr ar-Rubāʾ and it was published in Cairo, Egypt in 1299 AH.
- Al-Fayḍ as-Samāʾī ʿalā Sunan al-Nasāʾī, by Mawlānā Rashīd Aḥmad Gangôhī (d. 1323 AH), with additions from Shaykh al-Ḥadīth Mawlānā Muḥammad Zakariyyā Kāndhelwī (d. 1402 AH). It is published by Maktabah Khalīliyyah Saharanpur in three volumes with some footnotes by Shaykh al-Ḥadīth Mawlāna Muḥammad ʿĀqil (b. 1356 AH).
- Kitābāt ʿalā Kutub as-Sittah, by Aḥmad ibn Zīnī Daḥlān al-Makkī (d. 1304 AH).
- Al-Mujtabā min al-Mujtanā fī Rijāl Kitāb Abī ʿAbd ar-Raḥmān an-Nasāʾī fī Sunan al-Maʾthūrah wa Sharḥ Gharībih, by Muḥammad ibn Aḥmad Abū al-Muẓaffar al-Abyūrdī (d. 507 AH).
- Al-Muktafā bi Ḥal al-Mujtabā, by Shaykh Abū Muḥammad Aḥmad Ḥusain al-Maẓāhirī al-Hindī. Only one volume of this commentary has been published on Kitāb Ṭahārah (purity).
- The incomplete Sharḥ by Shaykh ʿAbd al-Qādir ibn Badrān ad-Dūmī al-Hanbalī (d. 1342 AH).

=== Urdu commentaries & annotations ===
- Sharḥ Sunan Nasāʾī Sharīf, by ʿAllāmah Muḥammad Liyāqat ʿAlī Riḍwī. It is published by Shabbir Brothers in six volumes and is available online.
- Al-Fuyūḍ az-Zāhī fī Sharḥ Sunan an-Nasāʾī, by Dr. Muftī Muḥammad Karīm Khān. It is published by Progress Books in ten volumes.
- Sunan an-Nasāʾī Sharḥ, by Hāfiẓ Muḥammad Amīn. Although this is mainly a translation, it nevertheless contains quite a lot of commentary and benefits. It is published by Dār al-ʿIlm, Mumbai, in seven volumes with the taḥqīq (research) and takhrīj (citation of ḥadīth) of Hāfiẓ Abū Ṭāhir Zubayr ʿAlīzai.

== See also ==
- List of Sunni books
- Sahih al-Tirmidhi
- Sunan Abu Dawood
- Either: Sunan ibn Majah, Muwatta Imam Malik
