= Nawawi =

The Arabic attributive title Nawawi (Arabic: النووي), denoting an origin from Nawa, Syria, may refer to:

- Al-Nawawi (1233–1277), Sunni Muslim author on Fiqh and hadith
- Aznil Nawawi (born 1962), Malaysian actor
- Mirnawan Nawawi (born 1971), Malaysian field hockey player
- Nawawi Ahmad, Malaysian politician
- Nik Zul Aziz Nawawi (born 1987), Malaysian footballer
- Uston Nawawi (born 1978), Indonesian footballer
