= Shu'ayb al-Arna'ut =

Syrian-Albanian scholar of hadith (1928–2016)

Sheikh Shu'ayb al-Arna'ut
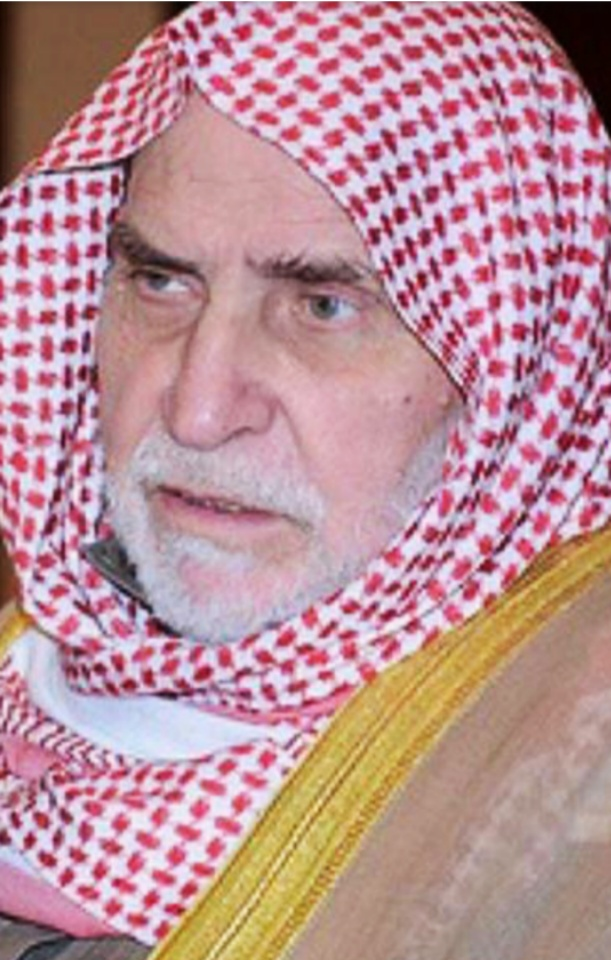

Personal life
- Born: Shu'ayb ibn Muharram al-Albani al-Arna'ut; 1928 Damascus, Syria
- Died: October 27, 2016 (aged 87–88) Amman, Jordan
- Occupation: Cleric

Religious life
- Religion: Islam
- Denomination: Sunni
- Jurisprudence: Hanafi
- Creed: Athari

Shu'ayb ibn Muharram al-Albani al-Arna'ut (Arabic: شعيب بن محرم الألباني الأرناؤوطي) (1928–2016) was a well known Albanian scholar of Hadith in the Islamic World. He was famous for his works on Hadith Methodology, Manuscript Investigation and Research and Hadith Criticism. His Kunya is Abu Usama.

== Biography ==
He was born in Damascus, Syria in the year 1928. His family were originally Muslim Albanians from Shkodër in North Albania, which spoke in the Gheg dialect of the Albanian language. His family immigrated to Syria before his birth, in 1926 in search of a better life. Al-Arna'ut followed the Hanafi school of Jurisprudence. Although he is most well known for his work on Hadith Literature, al-Arna'ut was a strong proponent of Sunni Orthodoxy and following the four Madhhabs. He died on October 27, 2016.

== Works ==
His most notable work was as chief editor of a 45 volume work on the Musnad of Ahmad Ibn Hanbal in which he investigated various manuscripts, cross-referenced with other Hadith books and critiqued over 28,000 Hadiths. His 16 volume work on Tahawi Sharh mushkil al-athar (The Explanation of Problematic Hadiths) and on Ibn Qayyim al-Jawziyya's Zad al-Ma'ad (Provisions of the Afterlife). Beyond those, he wrote several less known works on Hadith Methodology, Manuscript Investigation and Hadith Criticism.

== See also ==
- Al-Albani
- Abdul-Qadir al-Arna'ut
