= Al-Nasa'i =

Persian Islamic hadith scholar (829–915)

Imam Al-Nasa'i النسائي

Personal life
- Born: c. 829 AD (214 AH) Nasā, Khorasan, Abbasid Caliphate
- Died: c. 915 (303 AH) (aged 85–56) Damascus during Abbasid Caliphate
- Era: Islamic golden age (Abbasid era)
- Region: Abbasid Caliphate
- Main interest(s): Hadith and fiqh
- Notable work(s): Sunan al-Nasa'i; As-Sunan al-Kubra; Khasais of Amir Al Momenin

Religious life
- Religion: Islam
- Denomination: Sunni
- Jurisprudence: Shafi‘i

Muslim leader
- Influenced by: Ibn Rahwayh; Muhammad al-Bukhari; Abu Dawood; al-Juzajani; Qutayba ibn Sa'id

Al-Nasāʾī (215–303 AH; c. 830–915 CE), full name Abū ʿAbd al-Raḥmān Aḥmad ibn Shuʿayb ibn ʿAlī ibn Sinān ibn Baḥr ibn Dīnar al-Khurasānī al-Nasāʾī (Arabic: أبو عبد الرحمن أحمد بن شعيب النَّسائي), was a Muslim scholar and noted hadith collector from Nasa in historical Khorasan, in present-day Turkmenistan. He lived first in Egypt and later in Damascus.

Al-Nasāʾī compiled As-Sunan, which became one of the six canonical hadith collections recognized by Sunni Muslims. His collection was particularly concerned with details in the application of Islamic law and was especially admired by adherents of the Shāfiʿī school. From his larger collection, As-Sunan al-Kubrā ("The Large Sunan"), he produced an abridged version known as Al-Mujtabā or Sunan al-Sughra ("The Concise Sunan"). Of the fifteen works attributed to him, six deal specifically with the science of hadith.

== Biography ==
Of Persian origin, Al-Nasa'i himself states he was born in the year 830 (215 h.) - although some say it was in 829 or 869 (214 or 255 h.) - in the city of Nasa in present-day Turkmenistan - part of Khorasan, a region in Western Asia and Central Asia known for its many centres of Islamic learning. There he attended the gatherings and circles of knowledge, known as "halaqat". His fascination with knowledge began at an early age. In the year 230 AH, at about 15 years old, he began his travels with his first journey to Qutaibah b. Saʿīd where he stayed in the city of Baghlan for a year and two months. He covered the whole Arabian Peninsula seeking knowledge from scholars in Iraq, Kufa, the Hijaz, Syria and Egypt, where he eventually settled and where scholars would travel to to visit him. He was an unparalleled scholar of his time. A habit of his was to fast every other day, as this was a habit of Dawud.

He had a radiant face, well into his old age. He came from a wealthy background and would often wear Nubian clocks. Imam Dhahabī narrates a story about Imam Nasāʾi of when he went to the circle of al-Hārith b. Miskīn and he refused to let Imam Nasāʾi enter fearing he was a government spy due to his elevated apparel uncommon for students of Islamic knowledge of the time. Imam Nasāʾi then sat behind a door and listened to al-Hārith b. Miskīn read hadith.

=== Death ===
In 302 AH/915 AD, he stopped by in the city of Damascus in between his long journey from Cairo to Mecca just as a stopping point. Near the time of his death, he had become a renowned scholar in the Islamic world and decided to give a speech in the Umayyad Mosque as a scholar of his repute tends to do. The lecture he did was on the virtues of the companions of Muhammad, specifically throughout the lecture he recited the virtues of Ali that he had heard of throughout his life. His narrating the virtues of Ali railed up the crowd due to the anti-Alid sentiments in Damascus. In opposition, the crowd felt that there was nothing about Mu'awiya I in the lecture and asked him to narrate something related to the Umayyad caliph. He responded back by saying the only narration that he had heard about him about Mu'awiya by Muhammed was when Muhammed prayed to Allah saying "May Allah not fill his stomach" which he meant as a praise as is narrated by Imam Muslim. The crowd took this angrily leading the crowd to beat him. Those anti-Alid Syrians crushed Imam an-Nasa'i's testicles and cut open his stomach because of which Imam got martyred. It is said he was buried between Safā and Marwā or in Palestine.

=== Teachers ===
According to the hafiz Ibn Hajr Alaih, al-Nasa'i's teachers were too numerous to name, but included:

- Ishaq Ibn Rahwayh
- Imam Abu Daud Al-Sijistani (author of Sunan Abu Dawood)
- Qutayba ibn Sa'id

Hafiz ibn Hajr and others claimed that Imam Bukhari was among his teachers. However Al-Mizzi, refutes that the Imam ever met him. As-Sakhawi gives the reasons in great detail for al-Mizzi's claim that they never met, but argues these must apply also to his claim that An-Nasa'i heard from Abu Dawud. Moreover, Ibn Mundah narrates the following: We were informed by Hamzah, that an-Nasa'i, Abu Abd-ur-Rahman informed us saying, 'I heard Muhammad Ibn Isma'il Al-Bukhari...' Ibrahim ibn Ya'qub al-Juzajani was also an influence.

In Egypt an-Nasa'i began to lecture, mostly narrating ahadith (hadith plural) to the extent that he became known by the title "Hafizul Hadeeth". His lectures were well attended and among his many students were the scholars:

- Imam Abul Qasim Tabrani
- Imam Abu Bakr Ahmed ibn Muhammad, also known as Allamah ibn Sunni
- Sheikh Ali, the son of the Muhaddith, Imam Tahawi.

=== School of Thought ===
Imam An-Nasa'i was a follower of the Shafi'i fiqh (jurisprudence) according to Allamah as-Subki, Shah Waliullah, Shah Abdulaziz and many other scholars. The renowned scholars, Allamah Anwar Shah Kashmiri and Ibn Taymiyyah consider him a Hanbali.

=== Family ===
Imam an-Nasa'i had four wives but historians mention only one son, Abdul Kareem, a narrator of the Sunan of his father.

=== Books ===
Selected works:

- As-Sunan al-Kubra
- Sunan Al-Sugra/ Al-Mujtana/ Al-Mujtaba
- Amal Yawmi Wallaylah
- Kitab Ad-Du’afaa'i wal Matrookeen
- Khasais of Amir Al Momenin
- Al-Jurhu wa Ta'adeel
- Sunan An-Nasa'i
- Qasayis e Murtazavi
- Kitāb An-Nu'ūt
