= Abu Dawud al-Sijistani =

Islamic hadith scholar (c. 817 – 889)

Imam Abu Dawud al-Sijistani
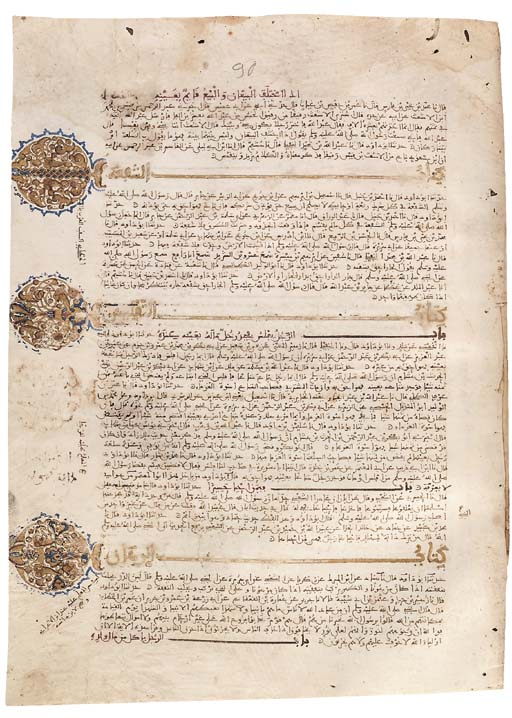
- Manuscript of al-Sijistani's Kitab al-sunan, probably created in Al-Andalus, dated 13th century

Personal life
- Born: 817–18 CE / 202 AH Sistan, Abbasid Caliphate
- Died: 889 CE / 275 AH Basra, Abbasid Caliphate
- Era: Islamic golden age (Abbasid era)
- Main interest(s): ḥadīth and fiqh
- Notable work: Sunan Abī Dāwūd
- Occupation: muhaddith

Religious life
- Religion: Islam
- Denomination: Sunni

Muslim leader
- Influenced by: Ibrahim ibn Ya'qub al-Juzajani, Ahmad ibn Hanbal, Ali ibn al-Madini, Ishaq Ibn Rahwayh, Yahya ibn Ma'in
- Influenced: Tirmidhi, Al-Nasa'i

Abū Dāwūd (Dā’ūd) Sulaymān ibn al-Ash‘ath ibn Isḥāq al-Azdī al-Sijistānī (Arabic: أبو داود سليمان بن الأشعث الأزدي السجستاني; 817–889), commonly known as Abū Dāwūd al-Sijistānī, was a Muslim scholar of prophetic hadith and compiler of the Sunan Abū Dāwūd, the third of the six "canonical" hadith collections recognized by Sunni Muslims.

Abū Dāwūd is said to have learned 500,000 traditions, of which he selected 4,800 for his Sunan. Ibn Ḥanbal, who taught him, is said to have approved of the work, and it was also said that possession of the Qurʾān and Abū Dāwūd's Sunan rendered anything further unnecessary. The traditions collected in the work are principally concerned with judicial matters.

== Biography ==
A Persian of Arab descent, Abū Dā’ūd was born in Sistan and died in 889 in Basra. He travelled widely collecting ḥadīth (traditions) from scholars in numerous locations including Iraq, Egypt, Syria, Hijaz, Tihamah, Nishapur and Merv. His focus on legal ḥadīth arose from a particular interest in fiqh (law). His collection included 4,800 ḥadīth, selected from some 500,000. His son, Abū Bakr ‘Abd Allāh ibn Abī Dawud (died 928/929), was a well known ḥāfiẓ and author of Kitāb al-Masābīh, whose famous pupil was Abū 'Abd Allāh al-Marzubānī.

== School of thought and Quotes ==
Abu Dawud has stated: "From this book of mine four Hadith are sufficient for an intelligent and insightful person. They are:

- Deeds are to be judged only by intentions.
- Part of a man's good observance of Islam is that he leaves alone that which does not concern him.
- None of you can be a believer unless you love for your brother that which you love for yourself.
- The permitted (halal) is clear, and the forbidden (haram) is clear, between these two are doubtful matters. Whosoever abstains from these doubtful matters has saved his religion."

== Works ==
Principal among his twenty-one works are:

- Sunan Abu Dāwūd: contains 4,800 hadith – mostly sahih (authenticated), some marked ḍaʿīf (unauthenticated) – usually numbered after the edition of Muhammad Muhyi al-Din `Abd al-Hamid (Cairo: Matba`at Mustafa Muhammad, 1354 AH/1935 CE), where 5,274 are distinguished. Islamic scholar Ibn Hajar al-Asqalani, and some others, believe a number of the unmarked hadith are ḍaʿīf.
- Kitab al-Marāsīl lists 600 extensively investigated sahih mursal hadith.
- Risālat Abu Dāwūd ilā Ahli Makkah: letter to the people of Makkah describing his Sunan Abu Dāwūd collection.

== See also ==
- Kutub al-Sittah
- Sunan Abu Dawood

== Bibliography ==
- Baghdādī (al-), Al-Khaṭīb Abū Bakr Aḥmad ibn ‘Alī (2001). Ta'rīkh Madīnat al-Salām (Ta'rīkh Baghdād) (in Arabic). Vol. X, §4591. Beirut: Dār al-Gharib al-Islāmī. p. 75.
- Khallikān (Ibn), Aḥmad ibn Muḥammad (1843). Wafayāt al-A'yān wa-Anbā' Abnā' al-Zamān (The Obituaries of Eminent Men). Vol. I. Translated by McGuckin de Slane, William. Paris: Oriental Translation Fund of Great Britain and Ireland. pp. 590–91.
- Nadīm (al), Abū al-Faraj Muḥammad ibn Isḥāq Abū Ya’qūb al-Warrāq (1970). Dodge, Bayard (ed.). The Fihrist of al-Nadim; a tenth-century survey of Muslim culture. New York & London: Columbia University Press. ISBN 9780231029254.
- Nawawī (al-), Abū Zakarīyā’ Yaḥyā (1847) [1842]. Wüstenfeld, Ferdinand (ed.). Kitāb Tahdhīb al-Asmā' (Biographical Dictionary of Illustrious Men) (in Arabic). Göttingen: London Society for the Publication of the Oriental Texts. p. 708 Arabic.
