= Sunan Abi Dawud =

Third hadith collection of the Six Books of Sunni Islam

- Seven-volume collection of Sunan Abi Dawud
- Author: Abu Dawud al-Sijistani
- Original title: سنن أبي داود
- Language: Arabic
- Series: Kutub al-Sitta
- Genre: Hadith collection

Sunan Abi Dawud (Arabic: سنن أبي داود, romanized: Sunan Abī Dāwūd) is the third hadith collection of the Six Books of Sunni Islam. It was compiled by scholar Abu Dawud al-Sijistani (d. 889).

== Introduction ==
Abu Dawood compiled twenty-one books related to Hadith and preferred those Ahadith (plural of "Hadith") which were supported by the example of the companions of Muhammad. As for the contradictory Ahadith, he states under the heading of 'Meat acquired by hunting for a pilgrim': "if there are two contradictory reports from the Prophet (SAW), an investigation should be made to establish what his companions have adopted". He wrote in his letter to the people of Mecca: "I have disclosed wherever there was too much weakness in regard to any tradition in my collection. But if I happen to leave a Hadith without any comment, it should be considered as sound, albeit some of them are more authentic than others". The Mursal Hadith (a tradition in which a companion is omitted and a successor narrates directly from Muhammad) has also been a matter of discussion among the traditionists. Abu Dawood states in his letter to the people of Mecca: "If a Musnad Hadith (uninterrupted tradition) is not contrary to a Mursal [Hadith], or a Musnad Hadith is not found, then the Mursal Hadith will be accepted though it would not be considered as strong as a Muttasil Hadith (uninterrupted chain)".

The traditions in Sunan Abu Dawood are divided in three categories. The first category consists of those of the traditions that are mentioned by Bukhari and/or Muslim. The second type of traditions are those which fulfil the conditions of Bukhari or Muslim. At this juncture, it should be remembered that Bukhari said, "I only included in my book Sahih Bukhari authentic traditions, and left out many more authentic ones than these to avoid unnecessary length".

== Description ==
Abu Dawood collected 500,000 hadith, but included only 4,800 in this collection. Sunnis regard this collection as fourth in strength of their six major hadith collections. It took Abu Dawod 20 years to collect the hadiths. He made a series of journeys to meet most of the foremost traditionists of his time and acquired from them the most reliable hadiths, quoting sources through which it reached him. Since the author collected hadiths which no one had ever assembled together, his sunan has been accepted as a standard work by scholars from many parts of the Islamic world, especially after Ibn al-Qaisarani's inclusion of it in the formal canonization of the six major collections.

Abu Dawood started traveling and collecting ahadeeth at a young age. He traveled to many places in the middle east, including Egypt, Iraq, and Syria. Abu Dawood also studied under Imam Ahmad Ibn Hanbal.

== Contents ==
Editor, Muhammad Muhyiddin Abd al-Hamid's 1935, Cairo publication, in 4 volumes, provides the standard topical classification of the hadith Arabic text. Sunan Abu Dawood is divided into 43 'books'.

1. purification (kitab al-taharah)
2. prayer (kitab al-salat)
3. the book of the prayer for rain (kitab al-istisqa)
4. prayer (kitab al-salat): detailed rules of law about the prayer during journey
5. prayer (kitab al-salat): voluntary prayers
6. prayer (kitab al-salat): detailed injunctions about ramadan
7. prayer (kitab al-salat): prostration while reciting the qur'an
8. prayer (kitab al-salat): detailed injunctions about witr
9. zakat (kitab al-zakat)
10. the book of lost and found items
11. the rites of hajj (kitab al-manasik wa'l-hajj)
12. marriage (kitab al-nikah)
13. divorce (kitab al-talaq)
14. fasting (kitab al-siyam)
15. jihad (kitab al-jihad)
16. sacrifice (kitab al-dahaya)
17. game (kitab al-said)
18. wills (kitab al-wasaya)
19. shares of inheritance (kitab al-fara'id)
20. tribute, spoils, and rulership (kitab al-kharaj, wal-fai' wal-imarah)
21. funerals (kitab al-jana'iz)
22. oaths and vows (kitab al-aiman wa al-nudhur)
23. commercial transactions (kitab al-buyu)
24. wages (kitab al-ijarah)
25. the office of the judge (kitab al-aqdiyah)
26. knowledge (kitab al-ilm)
27. drinks (kitab al-ashribah)
28. foods (kitab al-at'imah)
29. medicine (kitab al-tibb)
30. divination and omens (kitab al-kahanah wa al-tatayyur)
31. the book of manumission of slaves
32. dialects and readings of the qur'an (kitab al-huruf wa al-qira'at)
33. hot baths (kitab al-hammam)
34. clothing (kitab al-libas)
35. combing the hair (kitab al-tarajjul)
36. signet-rings (kitab al-khatam)
37. trials and fierce battles (kitab al-fitan wa al-malahim)
38. the promised deliverer (kitab al-mahdi)
39. battles (kitab al-malahim)
40. prescribed punishments (kitab al-hudud)
41. types of blood-wit (kitab al-diyat)
42. model behavior of the prophet (kitab al-sunnah)
43. general behavior (kitab al-adab)

== Translations ==
Sunan Abu Dawood has been translated into numerous languages. The Australian Islamic Library has collected 11 commentaries on this book in Arabic, Urdu and Indonesian.

== Arabic commentaries & annotations ==
1. Maʿālim as-Sunan Sharḥ Sunan Abī Dāwūd, by Imām Abū Sulaymān Ḥamd ibn Muḥammad al-Khaṭṭābī (d. 388 AH). It is published by Muʾassasat ar-Risālah Nāshirūn in four volumes with the taḥqīq (research) of Saʿd ibn Najdat ʿUmar.
2. At-Tawassuṭ al-Maḥmūd fī Sharḥ Sunan Abī Dāwūd, by Imām Walī ad-Dīn Ibn al-Irāqī (d. 826 AH). It was recently published by Muʾassasah ʿIlm li Iḥyā ’t-Turāth in two volumes with the taḥqīq (research) of ʿAbd al-ʿĀṭī Muḥyī ash-Sharqāwī .
3. Sharḥ Sunan Abī Dāwūd by Imām Shihāb ad-Dīn Abū ’l-ʿAbbās Aḥmad ibn Ḥusayn ibn Raslān (d. 844 AH). It is published by Dār al-Falāḥ in twenty volumes.
4. Sharḥ Sunan Abī Dāwūd, by Imām Maḥmūd ibn Aḥmad Badr ad-Dīn al-ʿAynī (d. 855 AH). It is published by Maktabat ar-Rushd in four volumes with the taḥqīq (research) of Abū ’l-Mundhir Khālid ibn Ibrāhīm al-Misrī.
5. Fatḥ al-Wadūd bi Sharḥ Sunan Abī Dāwūd, by Imām Abū ’l-Ḥasan Muḥammad ibn ʿAbd al-Hādī as-Sindī (d. 1138 AH). It is published by Jāʾizah Dubai ad-Dawliyyah li ’l-Qurʾān al-Karīm in eight volumes with the taḥqīq (research) of Aḥmad Jāsim al-Muḥammad.
6. Mirqāt as-Ṣuʿūd ilā Sunan Abī Dāwūd, by Imām Jalāl ad-Dīn as-Suyūṭī (d. 911 AH). It is published by Dār Ibn-Ḥazm in three volumes.
7. Badhl Al-Majhud Fi Hall Abi Dawud by Khalil Ahmad Saharanpuri (d. 1346 AH). It is published by Dār al-Bashāʾir al-Islāmiyyah in fourteen volumes, with the annotations of Mawlānā Zakariyyā Kandhlawī and the taḥqīq (research) of Dr. Taqi ad-Dīn an-Nadwī.

== Urdu commentaries & annotations ==
1. Inʿām al-Maʿbūd li Ṭālibāt Sunan Abī Dāwūd, by Mawlānā Maḥbūb Aḥmad. It is published by Maktabat al-ʿIlm and is available online.
2. Khayr al-Maʿbūd Sharḥ Sunan Abī Dāwūd, by Mawlānā Ṣūfī Muhammad Sarwar. It is published by Idārah Taʾlifāt Ashrafiyyah and is available online.
3. Ad-Durr al-Manḍūd ʿalā Sunan Abī Dāwūd, by Mawlānā Muḥammad ʿĀqil. It is published by Maktabat ash-Shaykh in six volumes and is available online.
4. As-Samḥ al-Maḥmūd fī Ḥal Sunan Abī Dāwūd, by Muftī Muḥammad ʿAbd ar-Razzāq Qāsmī. It is published by Zakariyyā Book Depot and is available online.
5. Falāḥ wa Behbūd Sharḥ Abū Dāwūd, by Mawlānā Muḥammad Ḥanīf Gangohī. It is published by Maktabah Imdādiyyah, Multan, in two volumes and is available online.

== See also ==
- Sahih al-Bukhari
- Sahih Muslim
- Sahih al-Tirmidhi
- Sunan al-Nasa'i
- Either: Sunan ibn Majah, Muwatta Imam Malik
