= Ibn Majah =

Persian Islamic hadith scholar (824–887)

Imam Abū ʿAbd Allāh Muḥammad ibn Yazīd Ibn Mājah al-Rabʿī al-Qazwīnī
- Title: Ibn Mājah

Personal life
- Born: c. 824 CE Qazvin, Persia, Abbasid Caliphate (present-day Iran)
- Died: c. 887 CE Qazvin, Persia, Abbasid Caliphate
- Era: Islamic golden age
- Main interest(s): Hadith, Fiqh
- Notable work(s): Sunan Ibn Mājah, Kitāb at-Tafsīr and Kitāb at-Tārīkh

Religious life
- Religion: Islam
- Denomination: Sunni

Abū ʿAbd Allāh Muḥammad ibn Yazīd Ibn Mājah al-Rabʿī al-Qazwīnī (Arabic: ابو عبد الله محمد بن يزيد بن ماجه الربعي القزويني; (b. 209/824, d. 273/887) commonly known as Ibn Mājah, was a medieval scholar of hadith of Persian origin. He compiled the last of Sunni Islam's six canonical hadith collections, Sunan Ibn Mājah.

== Biography ==
Qazwin (red), where Ibn Mājah was born and died, on a map of modern Iran

Ibn Mājah was born in Qazwin, the modern-day Iranian province of Qazvin, in 824 CE/209 AH to a family who were members (mawla) of the Rabīʻah tribe. Mājah was the nickname of his father, and not that of his grandfather nor was it his mother's name, contrary to those claiming this. The hāʼ at the end is un-voweled whether in stopping upon its pronunciation or continuing because it a non-Arabic name.

He left his hometown to travel the Islamic world visiting Iraq, Makkah, the Levant and Egypt. He studied under Ibn Abi Shaybah (through whom came over a quarter of al-Sunan), Muḥammad ibn ʻAbdillāh ibn Numayr, Jubārah ibn al-Mughallis, Ibrāhīm ibn al-Mundhir al-Ḥizāmī, ʻAbdullāh ibn Muʻāwiyah, Hishām ibn ʻAmmār, Muḥammad ibn Rumḥ, Dāwūd ibn Rashīd and others from their era. Abū Yaʻlā al-Khalīlī praised Ibn Mājah as "reliable (thiqah), prominent, agreed upon, a religious authority, possessing knowledge and the capability to memorize."

According to al-Dhahabī, Ibn Mājah died on approximately February 19, 887 CE/with eight days remaining of the month of Ramadan, 273 AH, or, according to al-Kattānī, in either 887/273 or 889/275. He died in Qazwin.

What he compiled/did Al-Dhahabī mentioned the following of Ibn Mājah's works:

- Sunan Ibn Mājah: one of the six canonical collections of hadith
- Kitāb al-Tafsīr: a book of Qur'an exegesis
- Kitāb al-Tārīkh: a book of history or, more likely, a listing of hadith transmitters

The last two, though praised by scholars, have been lost.

=== The Sunan ===
The Sunan consists of 1,500 chapters and about 4,000 hadith. Upon completing it, he read it to Abu Zur’a al-Razi, a hadith authority of his time, who commented, "I think that were people to get their hands on this, the other collections, or most of them, would be rendered obsolete."
