= Kitab al-Zuhd wa al-Raqaiq =

Classical Arabic anthology attributed to Abd Allah ibn al-Mubarak

- Leipzig University Library Manuscripts
- Author: Abd Allah ibn al-Mubarak
- Original title: كتاب الزهد والرقائق
- Language: Arabic
- Subject: Islamic ethics
- Genre: Asceticism
- Media type: Print

'Kitab al-Zuhd wa al-Raqaiq (Arabic: كتاب الزهد والرقائق) is a Classical Arabic anthology attributed to Abd Allah ibn al-Mubarak (118–181 AH / 736–797 CE). In its English translation of the 2022 Turath edition, the work contains 1,158 numbered reports arranged under 48 topical sections. Ibn al-Mubarak was from Merv in Khurasan and lived through the establishment and early decades of the Abbasid Caliphate. It contains hadith, traditions, and other transmitted akhbār. The collection is a part of Classical Arabic literature and early Abbasid literary culture. There are two transmissions of this book: one of Marwazī and the other of Nuʿaym ibn Ḥammād .

Turath edition introduces the collection within a wider literature of works about the Islamic asceticism zuhd and raqāʾiq. The Indian Deobandi scholar Habib al-Rahman al-Azami edited the al-Marwazi manuscript. Some additions are from Yaḥyā ibn Ṣāʿid of Baghdad and Marwazī, but not of Ibn al-Mubārak. With a total number of narrations of 1,627. Al-Azami added the Zuhd version of Nu'aym ibn Hammad to Marwazī's. The English book removes such additions in an attempt, as editor said, to make the work “purely Ibn al-Mubārak’s.”

== Overview ==
Salem said that raqāʾiq derives from riqqa, meaning “a softness or ‘brittleness’ of the heart that is derived from its purification.” The anthology includes reports attributed to the Prophet Muhammad, the Companions, the Followers, later scholars, and earlier Israelite prophets such as Dāwūd.

Shaykh Tusi attributes a Kitāb al-Zuhd to the Shiʿi scholar Abū Ḥamza al-Thumālī (d. 150/767), writing, “He had a Kitāb al-Nawādir and a Kitāb al-Zuhd.” Fuat Sezgin likewise calls Abū Ḥamza's work “the earliest book known to us,” but identifies Ibn al-Mubārak's as “the earliest book from that period that has reached us.”

Ibn Taymiyya said, “Those who collected hadiths on zuhd and raqāʾiq mention what was narrated on this subject, and among the best and rarest works written on it is the Kitāb al-Zuhd of ʿAbd Allāh ibn al-Mubārak. It contains weak hadiths, as do the Kitāb al-Zuhd of Hannād ibn al-Sarī, Asad ibn Mūsā, and others. The best work composed on the subject is the Zuhd of Imam Ahmad, but it is arranged according to names, whereas Ibn al-Mubārak's Zuhd is arranged according to sections. These books mention the asceticism of the prophets, the Companions, and the Followers.”

== Tradition ==
The transmitters were not contemporaries of Ibn al-Mubārak's. Yaḥyā ibn Ṣāʿid was born in the year 228/843 and passed away in 318/930. Abū ʿUmar ibn passed away in Rabīʿ al-Ākhir in the year 382/992 at 87 years. Abū Bakr al-Warrāq passed away in the year 378/988 at 85 years al-Ḥusayn ibn al-Ḥasan Ḥarb al-Sulamī al-Marwazī lived and taught in Makkah. Ibn Ḥibbān and others considered him reliable. He passed away in the year 246/860. Yaḥyā ibn Ṣāʿid was a Hafiz born in the year 228/843 and passed away in 318/930. The book is recorded by a dated 6 person chain from 11th and 12th-century Abu Ghalib Ahmad, from his father Abu Ali ibn al-Banna to Ibn al-Mubārak alognsiding his companion Faḍl ibn Mūsā. There is a 1073 CE manuscript saved in the Qarawiyyin Library in Fez and transmitted through Abū Ismāʿīl Muḥammad ibn Ismāʿīl al-Tirmidhī from Nu'aym ibn Hammad from Ibn al-Mubārak. Ibn Ṣāʿid's isnad is dated Thursday, 24 Rabīʿ al-Awwal 315 AH (927–928 CE), while al-Marwazī isnad dated 245 AH (860 CE). This isnād spans at least 70 years between these two stages. The chain moves from Merv through Baghdad to Mecca, and Damascus. The Turath edition removes the extra narrations added by the narrators of Ibn al-Mubārak’s Zuhd and it does not contain Nuʿaym ibn Ḥammād’s Zuhd. It has 1,158 entries, 469 fewer than the al-Marwazī copy. Removes asānīd, repetitions, but it adds some brief commentaries.

== Contents ==
Counting the headings in the 2022 edition, the anthology is divided into 48 ascetic topic sections, varying in size. Sections range from 3 entries as in “The Earth Boasting” to 294 as in “Excellence of the Remembrance of Allah”. The final section alone therefore is 25% of the 1,158 reports. Other sections include Greed, religious ignorance, mercy , and the lowliness of the Dunya. Smaller sections include “The Earth Boasting”, “Fearing Death Because of Leaving Types of Worship”, and “Lying in Speech to Amuse People”. The book ranges from worship, death and reflection to wealth, charity, Islamic eschatology, social conduct, knowledge and remembrance.

Material attributed to many Islamic figures mostly al-Ḥasan al-Baṣrī, ʿAbd Allāh ibn Masʿūd, Abū al-Dardāʾ, Sufyān al-Thawrī, Fuḍayl ibn ʿIyāḍ, and ʿUmar ibn ʿAbd al-ʿAzīz. The corpus by groups by ascetic theme forms of hadith, akhbār, tafsir, dialogue, and poetry as short units.

Many akhbār are dialogic, written in the form of questions, responas, exchanges, and admonitions. Poetry appears in reports or directly by Ibn al-Mubarak. Poems include mourning, solitude, praise, and admonition.

Sections from 43 to 46 are case-specific and written around individuals. Whome are Uways al-Qaranī, Ṣunābiḥī, ʿĀmir ibn ʿAbd Qays, Ṣilah ibn Ashyam, Abū Rayḥānah, and ʿUmar ibn ʿAbd al-ʿAzīz.

== Other Editions ==
Fuat Sezgin records seven manuscripts of Kitāb al-Zuhd wa-l-Raqāʾiq, including copies at Leipzig, al-Qarawiyyin in Fez, Alexandria, the Jar Allah collection in Istanbul, the Zahiriyya Library in Damascus, and the Chester Beatty Library. Ḥabīb al-Raḥmān al-Aʿẓamī prepared the 1966 edition, commissioned to undertake the critical editing of the book and annotate it. Al-Aʿẓamī relied on “three copies”: the Jar Allah manuscript in Istanbul, the Alexandria manuscript, and the Zahiriyya manuscript in Damascus. His recensions added mainly those of al-Marwazī or ibn Sa'id in the first and Nuʿaym ibn Ḥammād in the second. professor Muhammad Said al-Bukhari states that al-Ḥusayn al-Marwazī's recension contained 1,627 reports: 358 attributed directly to the Prophet, 186 with incomplete chains to the Prophet, 498 sayings of the Companions, 583 sayings of the Followers and their students, and four reports with broken chains of isnad. He adds that 411 were reports by others than Ibn al-Mubarak. He also recorded 436 additions from Nuʿaym: 110 prophetic reports, 132 sayings of the Companions, and 194 sayings of the Followers and their students.

== See also ==
- List of Sunni books
- List of hadith books
