= Abu Muslim al-Khawlani =

Religious leader (died 684)

- Died: 684 CE

Philosophical work
- Era: Medieval era
- Region: Syria

Abu Muslim Al-Khawlani (Arabic: أبو مسلم الخولاني) (died 684) was a well-known tabi'i (plural: taba'een) and a prominent religious figure in Damascus, Syria. He was one of the 'Eight Ascetics,' who also included Amir ibn Abd al-Qays, Uways al-Qarani, Al-Rabi ibn Khuthaym, al-Aswad ibn Yazid, Masruq ibn al-Ajda', Sufyan al-Thawri ibn Said and Hasan al-Basri.

== Stories of his life ==
Sheikh 'Aa'id Abdullah al-Qarni said that Al Aswad al `Ansi, a man in Yemen who claimed prophethood, asked Abu Muslim to believe in him and testify that he is a messenger. Abu Muslim told him: "I can't hear a thing." Al Aswad al `Ansi prepared firewood and threw him in fire. Abu Muslim said: "Hasbuna'Llah wa ni`mal wakeel ("Allah is sufficient for us and He is the best Protector", words that Muslims believe Ibrahim (Abraham) said when he was thrown in fire, so God made the fire cool and safe for him. Al-‘Ansi’s advisors told him that if he did not banish Abu Muslim from Yemen, he would be a source of Fitnah for his followers. So, Abu Muslim was ordered to leave the land. He travelled to Al-Madeenah and upon arriving there, he dismounted from his camel and entered the Masjid to perform prayer. ‘Umar saw him, so he approached this stranger and said, “Where are you from?” Abu Muslim said, “Yemen.” ‘Umar inquired, "Tell me about the man whom the liar threw into the fire?" Abu Muslim said, “His name is ‘Abdullaah ibn Thawb.” ‘Umar said, “Tell me, by Allaah, are you him?” He replied, “By Allaah, yes!” ‘Umar embraced him with tearful eyes then seated him between him and Abu Bakr and said, “Praise be to Allaah who did not take my soul until I saw a man from the nation of Muhammad to whom was done what was done to Ibraaheem Al-Khaleel.’”

=== During the campaigns against the Byzantines ===
Historian of Islam David Cook cites another story:

"We [the Muslim troops] came from the land of the Byzantines returning [from battle]; when we had left Homs going towards Damascus we passed by a cultivated place which is near Homs—about four miles—at the end of the night. When the monk who was in the cell heard our speech, he came up to us and said: 'Who are you all?' We said: 'People from Damascus, coming from the land of the Byzantines.' He said: 'Do you know Abu Muslim al-Khawlani?' We said: 'Yes.' He said: 'When you come to him, greet him with the peace, and inform him that we find him in the Holy Books as a companion of Jesus son of Mary'."

Cook says that the Christian monk saw a spiritual kinship with the Muslim, Abu Muslim al-Khawlani said that when Jesus returns Abu Muslim will be a follower of Jesus.

Abu Muslim al-Khawlani died during the reign of Muawiya II in an expedition against the Byzantines. His last request to his commander was: "Put me in charge of the Muslims who died fighting with you, and tie for me a banner of military command over them, and make my grave the furthest of all graves [and the nearest] to the enemy, since I wish to arrive on Resurrection Day carrying their banner."

== See also ==
- Taba'een
