= Muslim scholars of the 1st century AH =

This article lists Muslim scholars of the 1st century AH. During the 1st century AH (622 – 719 CE), Mecca and Medina were the centers of knowledge. The Sahaba were the primary narrators of hadith during this period.

== List ==
- Ubay ibn Ka'b (? – 22 AH)
- Ibn Mas'ud (? – 32 AH)
- Ka'ab al-Ahbar (? – 32 AH)
- Wahb ibn Munabbih (? – 34 AH)
- Ali (23 BH – 40 AH)
- Abdullah ibn Sailam (? – 43 AH)
- Ahmad ibn Tawoos (? – 53 AH?)
- Abu Hurairah (? – 57 AH)
- Masruq ibn al-Ajda' (? – 62 AH?)
- Alqama ibn Qays (? – 62 AH?)
- Ibn Abbas (-3 AH – 68 AH)
- Sulaym ibn Qays (? – 70 AH)
- Ibn Umar (8 BH? – 74 AH)
- Aswad ibn Yazid (? – 75 AH)
- Ma'bad al-Juhani (? – 80 AH)
- Sahl ibn Sa'd (? – 91 AH)
- Urwah ibn Zubayr (? – 94 AH)
- Said ibn Al-Musayyib (? – 94 AH)
- Raja Ibn Haywah (? – ?)
- Ali ibn Abu Talha (? – ?)
- Uqbah ibn Amir (? – ?)
