= Tomb of Khajeh Rabie =

Telver Shi'ite mausoleum in Mashhad, Iran

- آرامگاه خواجه ربیع
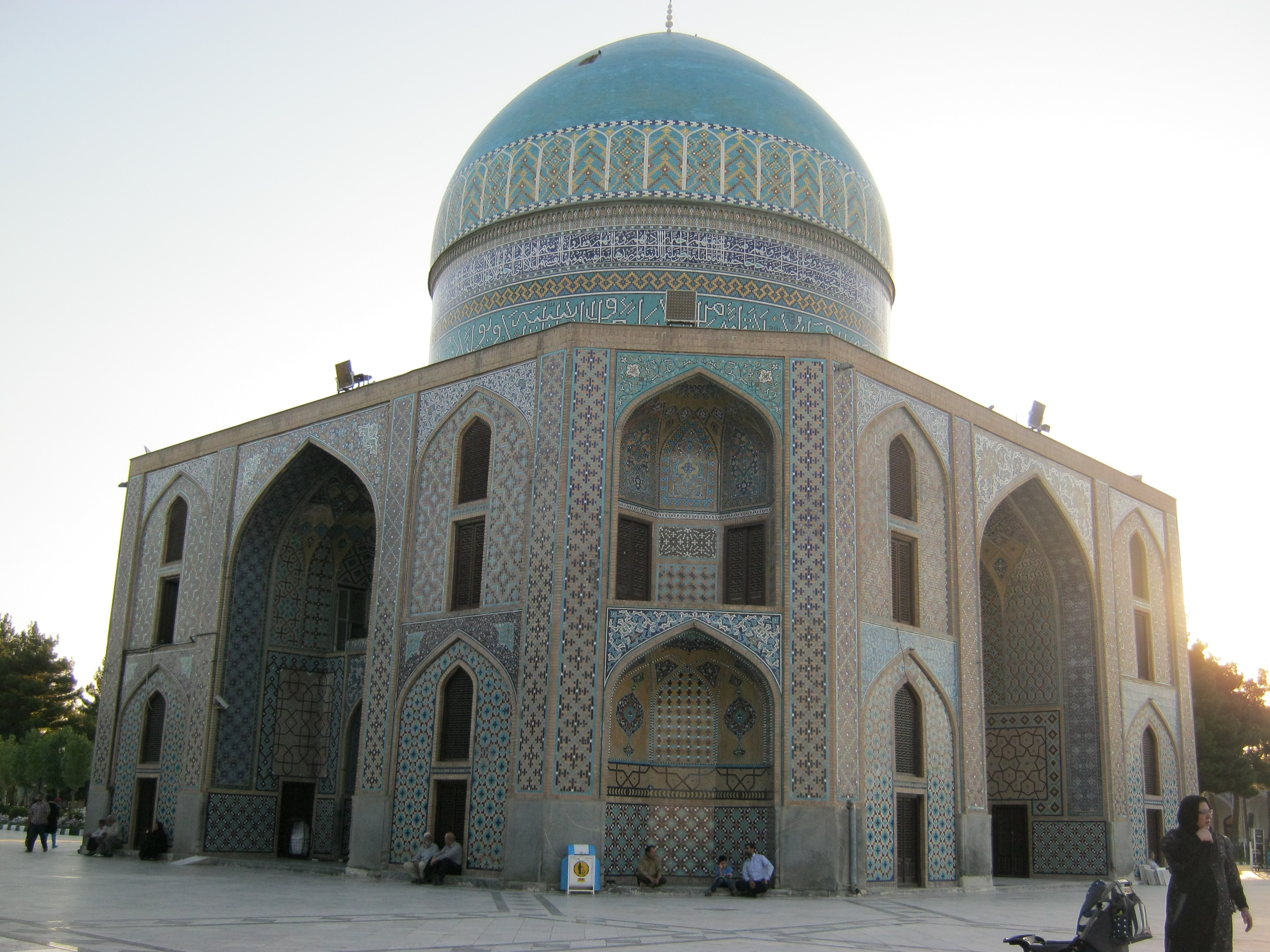
- The mausoleum complex in

- Location of the complex in Iran

Religion
- Affiliation: Shia (Twelver)
- Ecclesiastical or organisational status: Mausoleum and shrine
- Status: Active

Location
- Location: Mashhad, Razavi Khorasan province
- Country: Iran
- Interactive map of Tomb of Khajeh Rabie
- Coordinates: 36°20′32″N 59°37′46″E

Architecture
- Type: Islamic architecture
- Style: Safavid
- Completed: 1617 CE

Specifications
- Dome: One
- Dome height (outer): 18 m (59 ft)
- Shrine: One: Khajeh Rabie
- Materials: Bricks; mortar; tiles
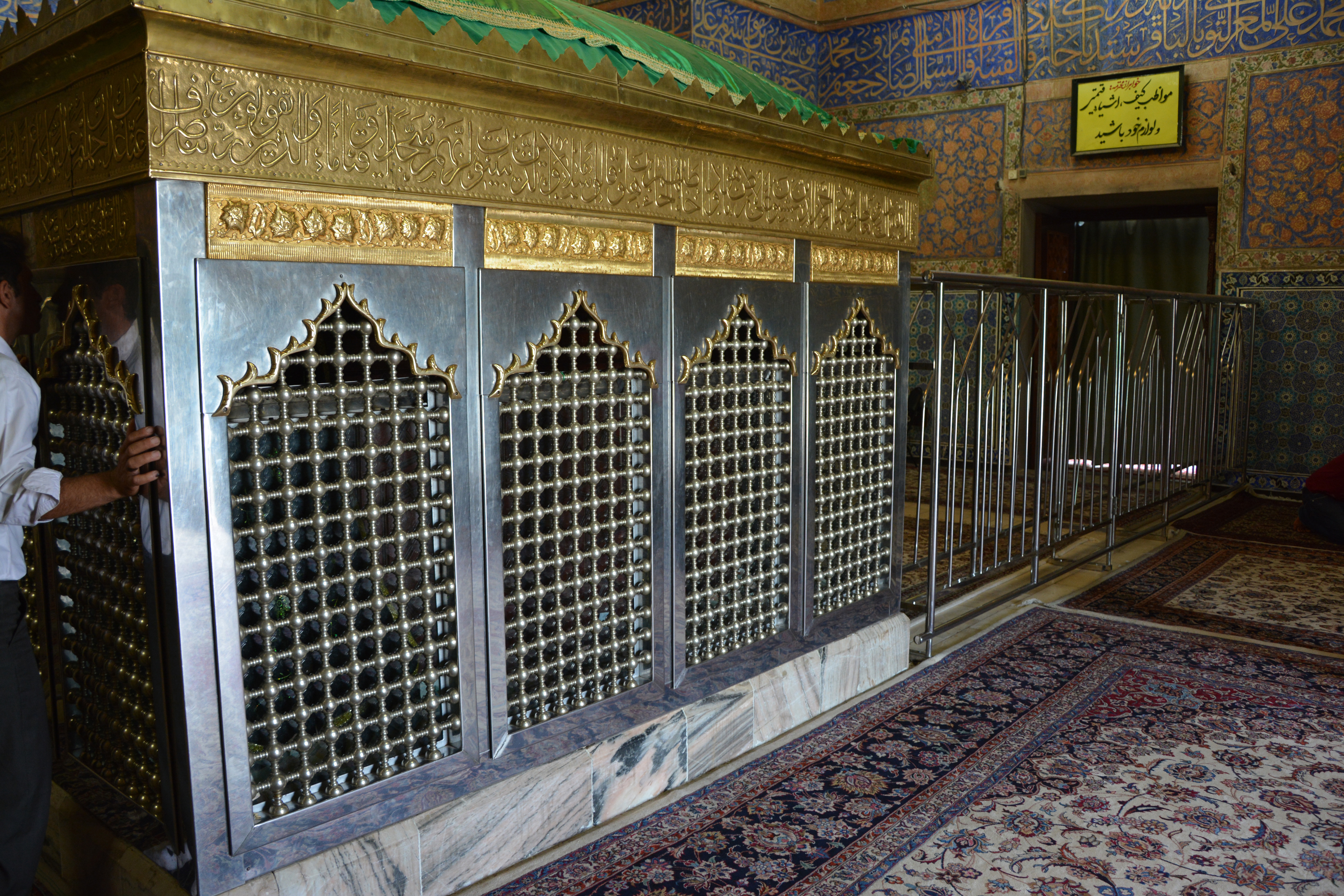
- The tomb of Al-Rabi ibn Khuthaym inside the mausoleum

Iran National Heritage List
- Official name: Mausoleum of Khwajeh Rabie
- Type: Mausoleum
- Designated: 1932
- Reference no.: 142
- Conservation organization: Cultural Heritage, Handicrafts and Tourism Organization of Iran

The Tomb of Khajeh Rabie (Persian: آرامگاه خواجه ربیع) is a Twelver Shi'ite mausoleum complex, located in Mashhad, in the province of Razavi Khorasan, Iran. The mausoleum was completed in 1617 CE and contains the tomb of Al-Rabi ibn Khuthaym, one of the early Tabi'een and a companion of Ali ibn Abi Talib.

The complex was added to the Iran National Heritage List on 6 January 1932, administered by the Cultural Heritage, Handicrafts and Tourism Organization of Iran.

== History ==
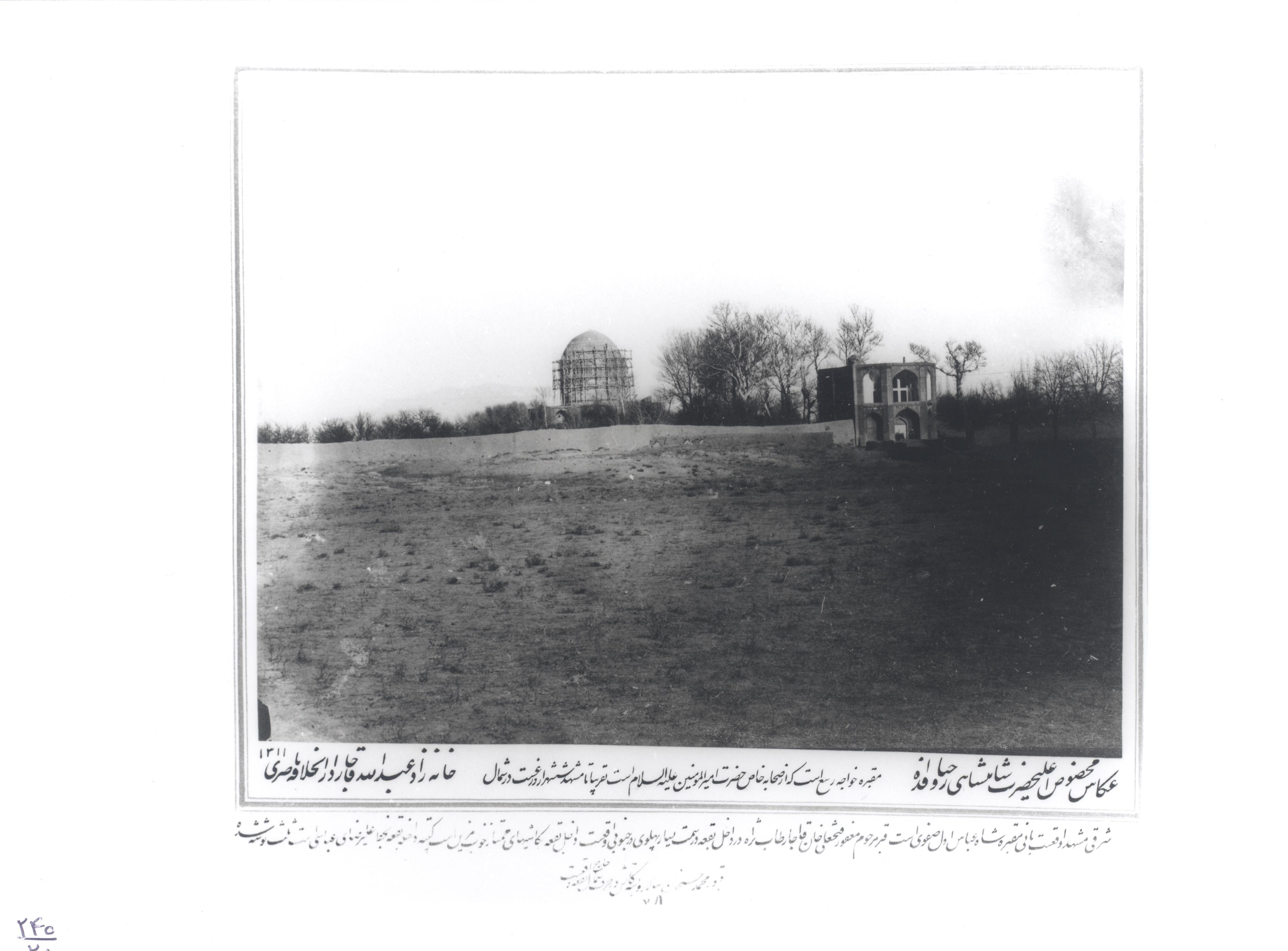
Distant view of the tomb, by Abdollah Mirza Qajar, 1894

The tomb of Al-Rabi already existed at the site after his death, and it was also visited by the eighth Imam, Ali ibn Musa al-Ridha. The current mausoleum was completed in 1617 CE under the reign of Shah Abbas I. He ordered the construction of the mausoleum to be carried out under the recommendation and advice of the Shi'ite cleric Baha al-Din al-Amili. Later in 1726, the former Safavid governor of Astarabad, Fath-Ali Khan Qajar, was buried outside the mausoleum.

== Architecture ==
The mausoleum building is octagonal in shape. Four large iwans are on the middle of each side on the exterior. Surrounding the mausoleum is a large garden.

An 18-metre (59 ft) dome, covered in turquoise tiles, tops the mausoleum. The tile work around the building is of matching colours. Inside the mausoleum, the tomb of Al-Rabi ibn Khuthaym is located underneath the large dome. There are also inscriptions written by calligraphers from the Safavid era, in the Thuluth and Bannai styles, located within the building.

== Gallery ==
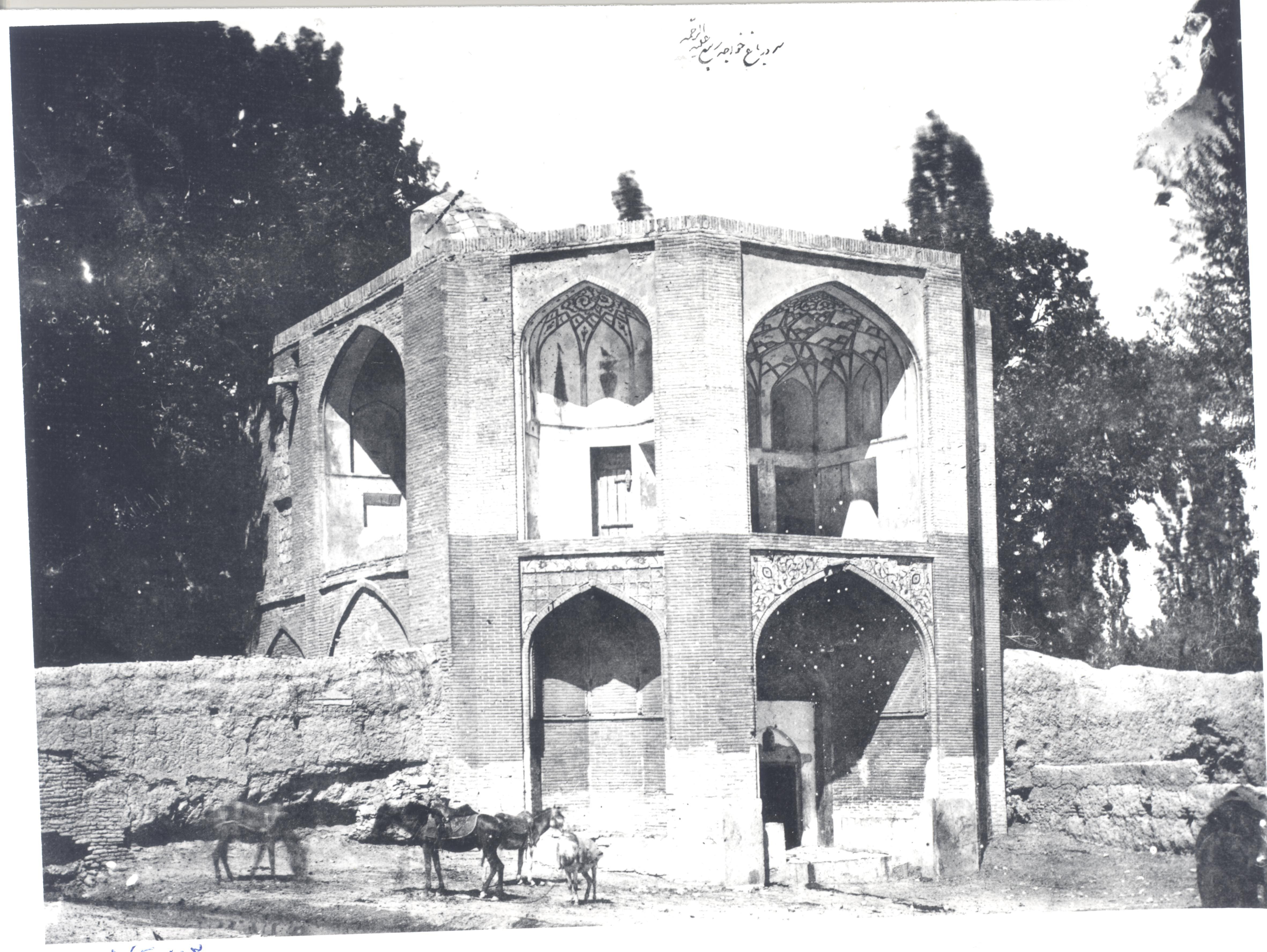
The gate to the tomb's garden, by Aqa Reza Akasbashi, late 19th century

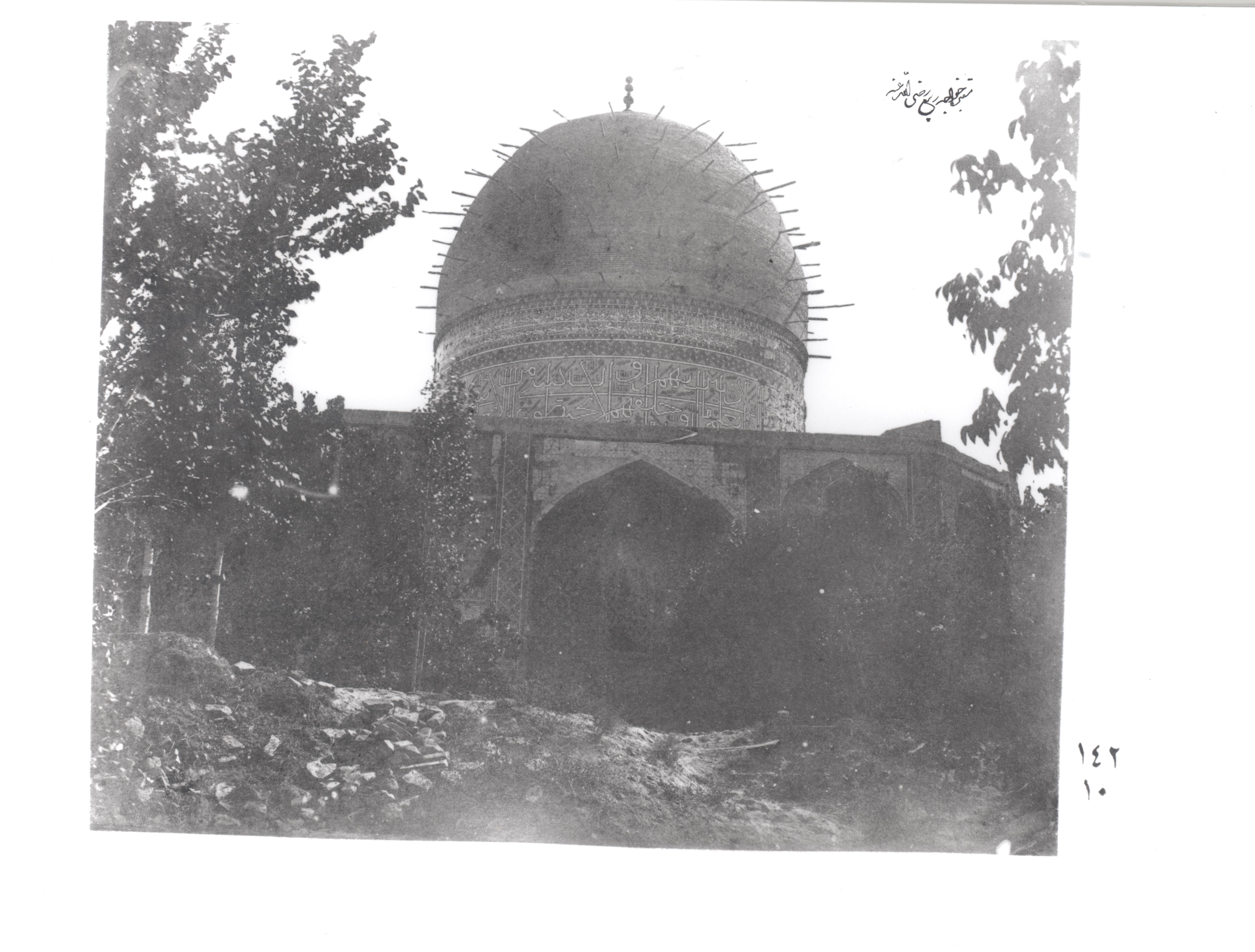
The tomb, by Aqa Reza Akasbashi, late 19th century

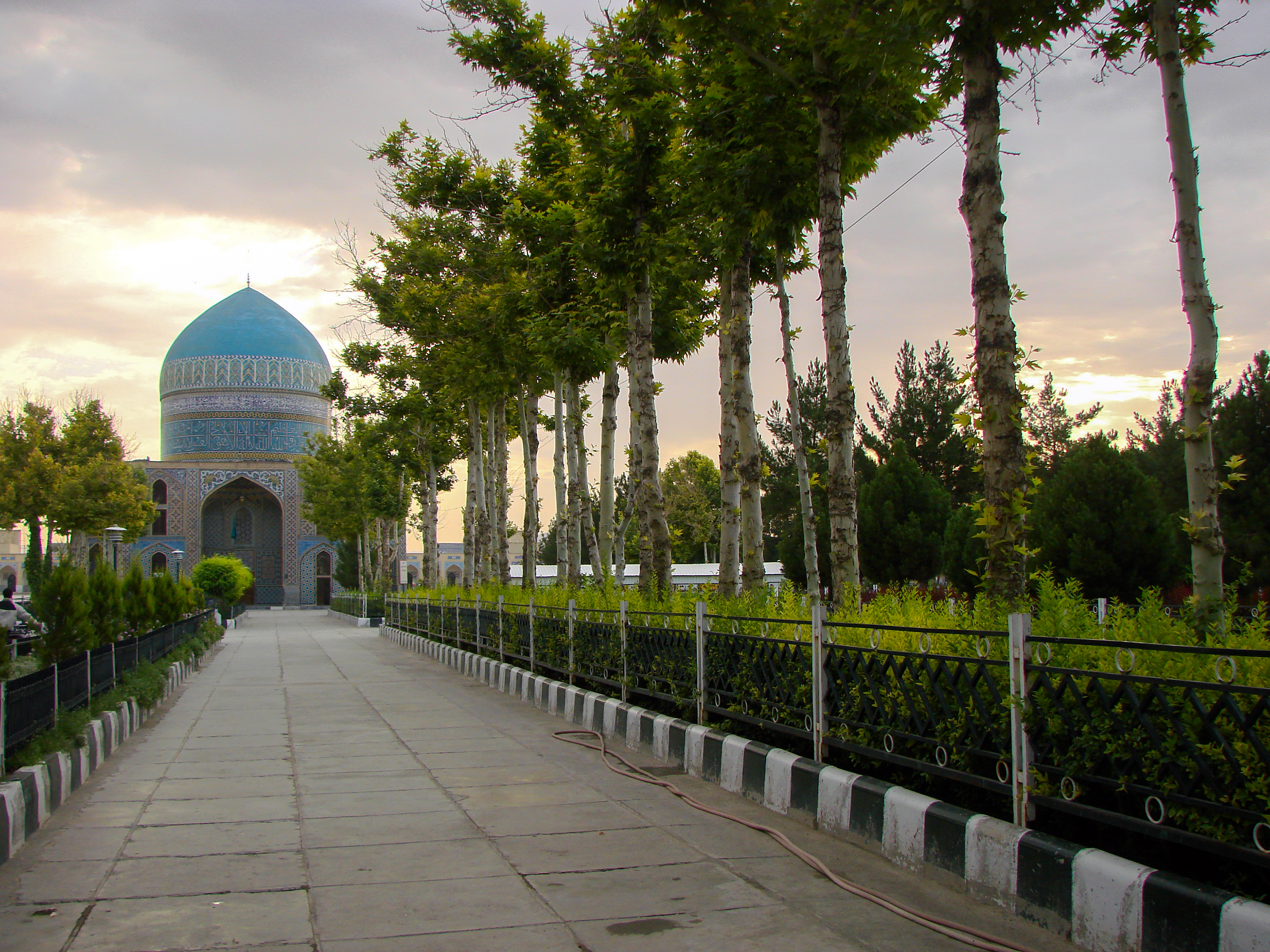

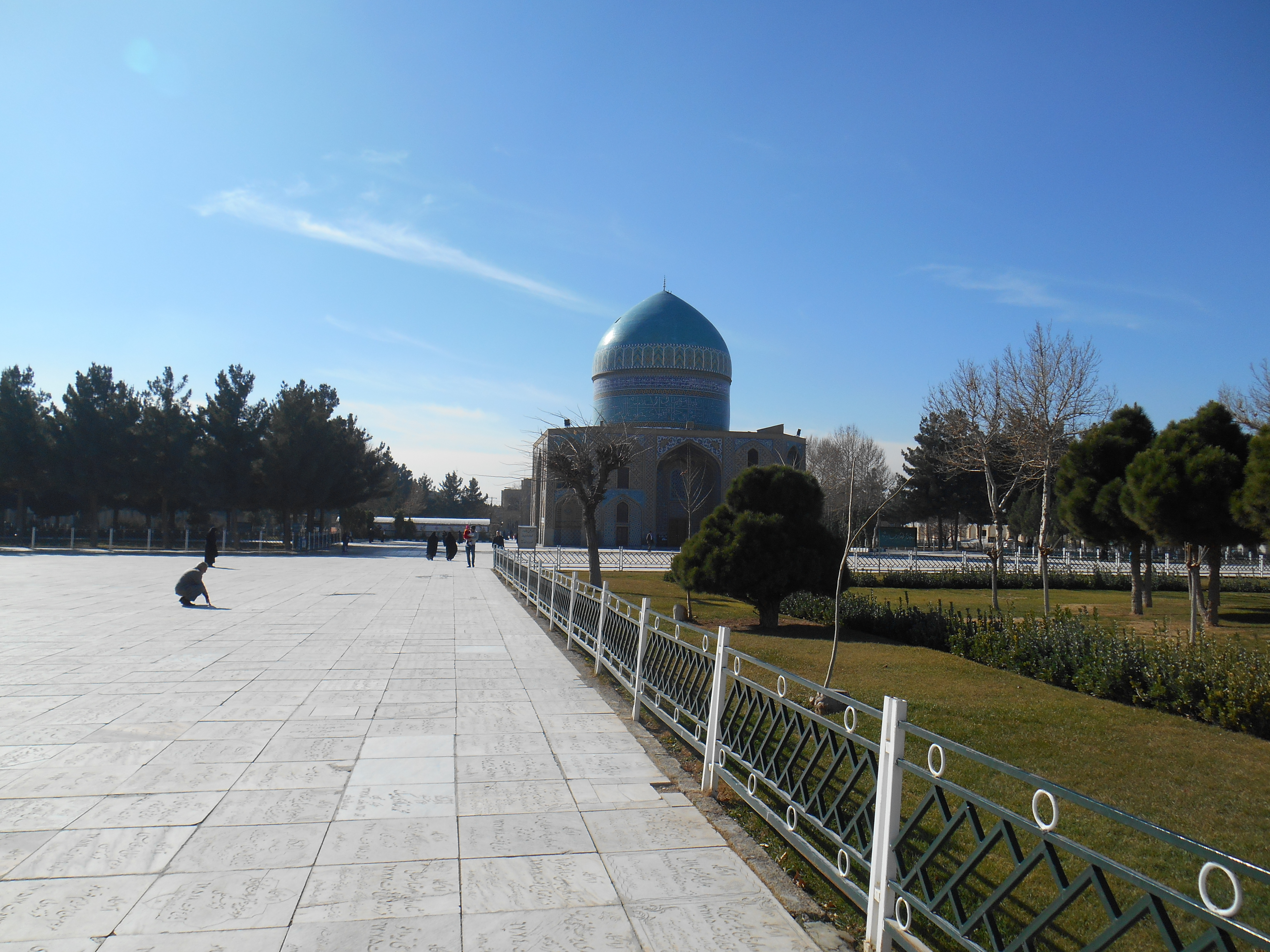

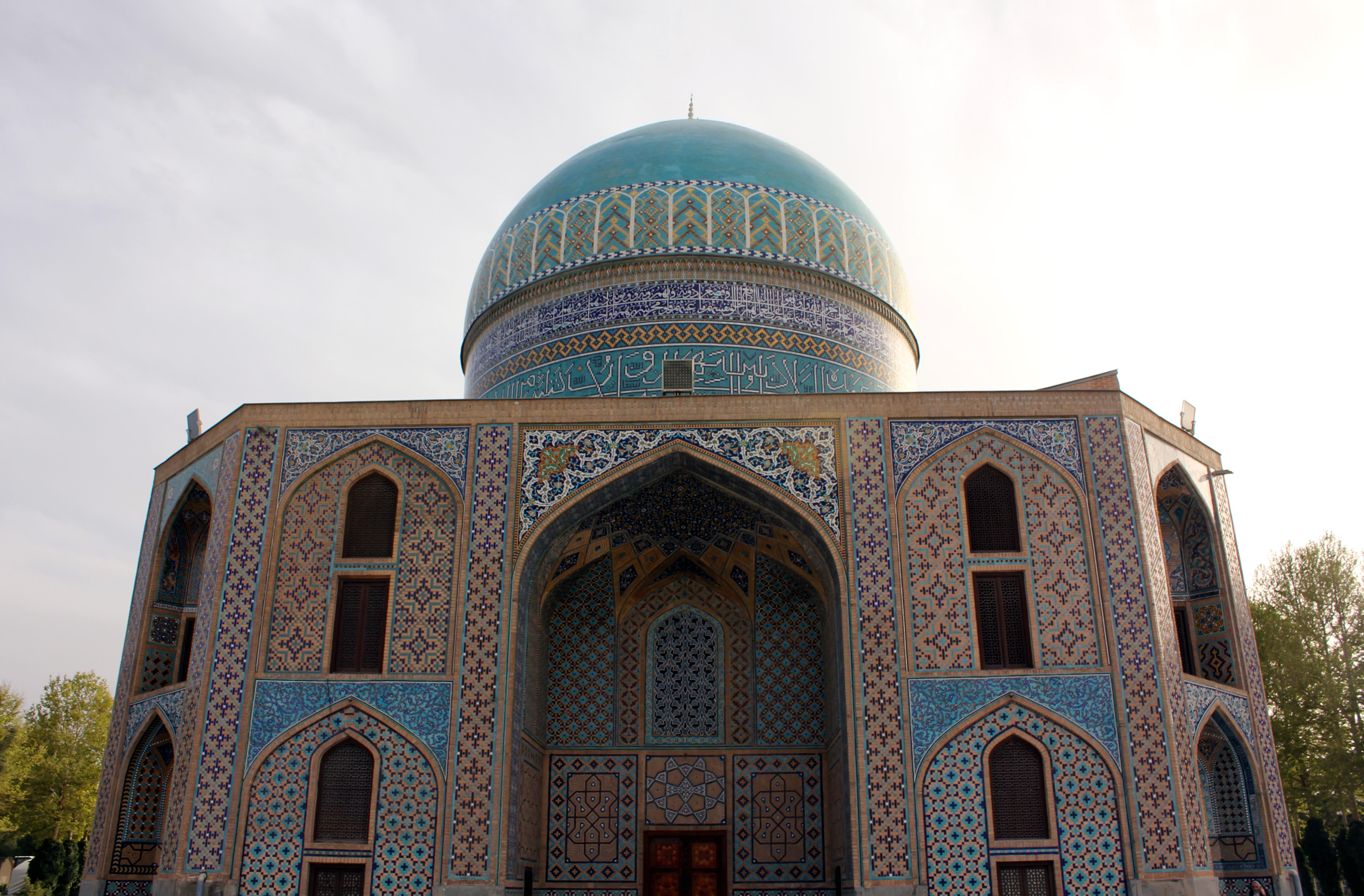

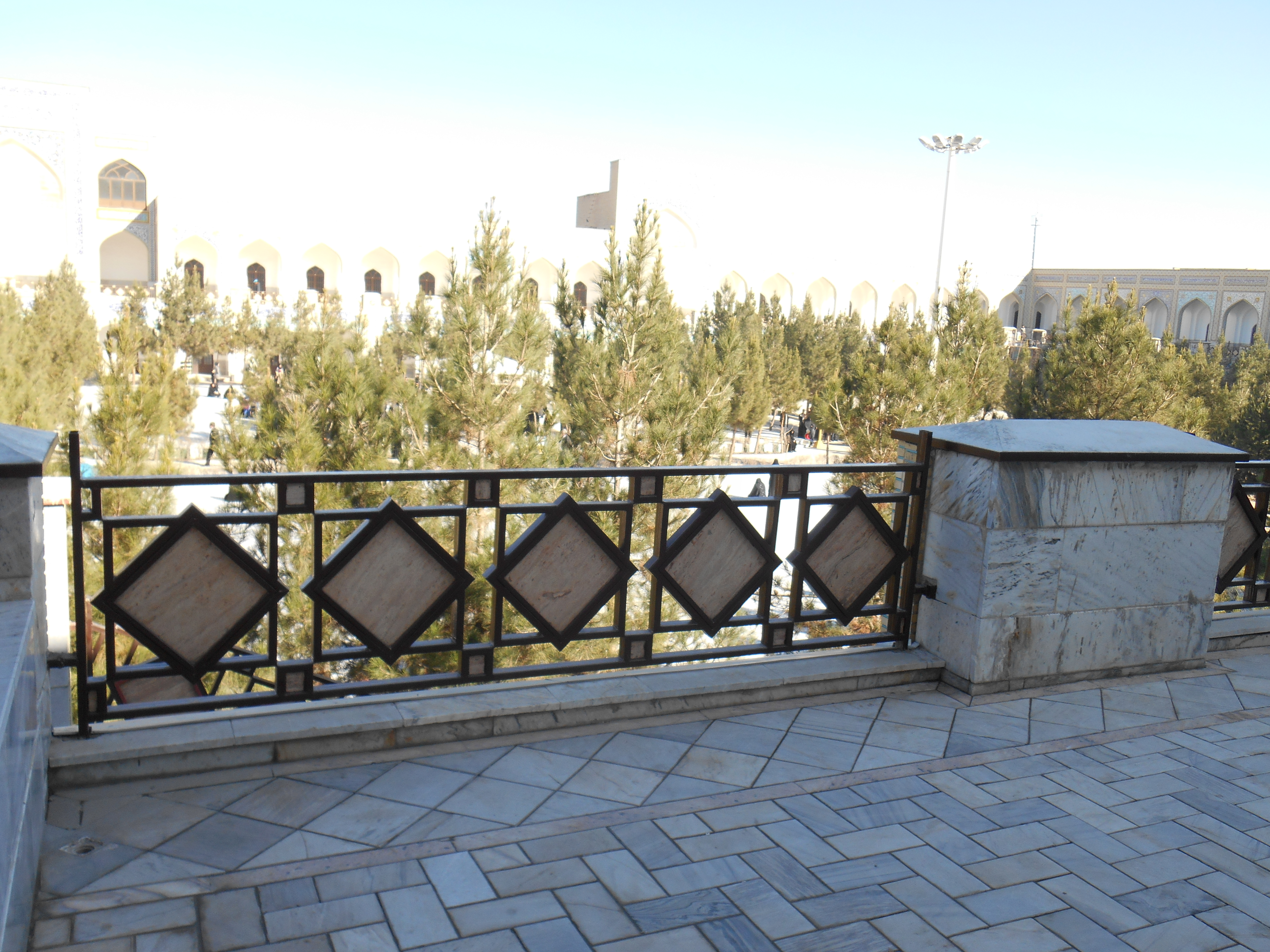

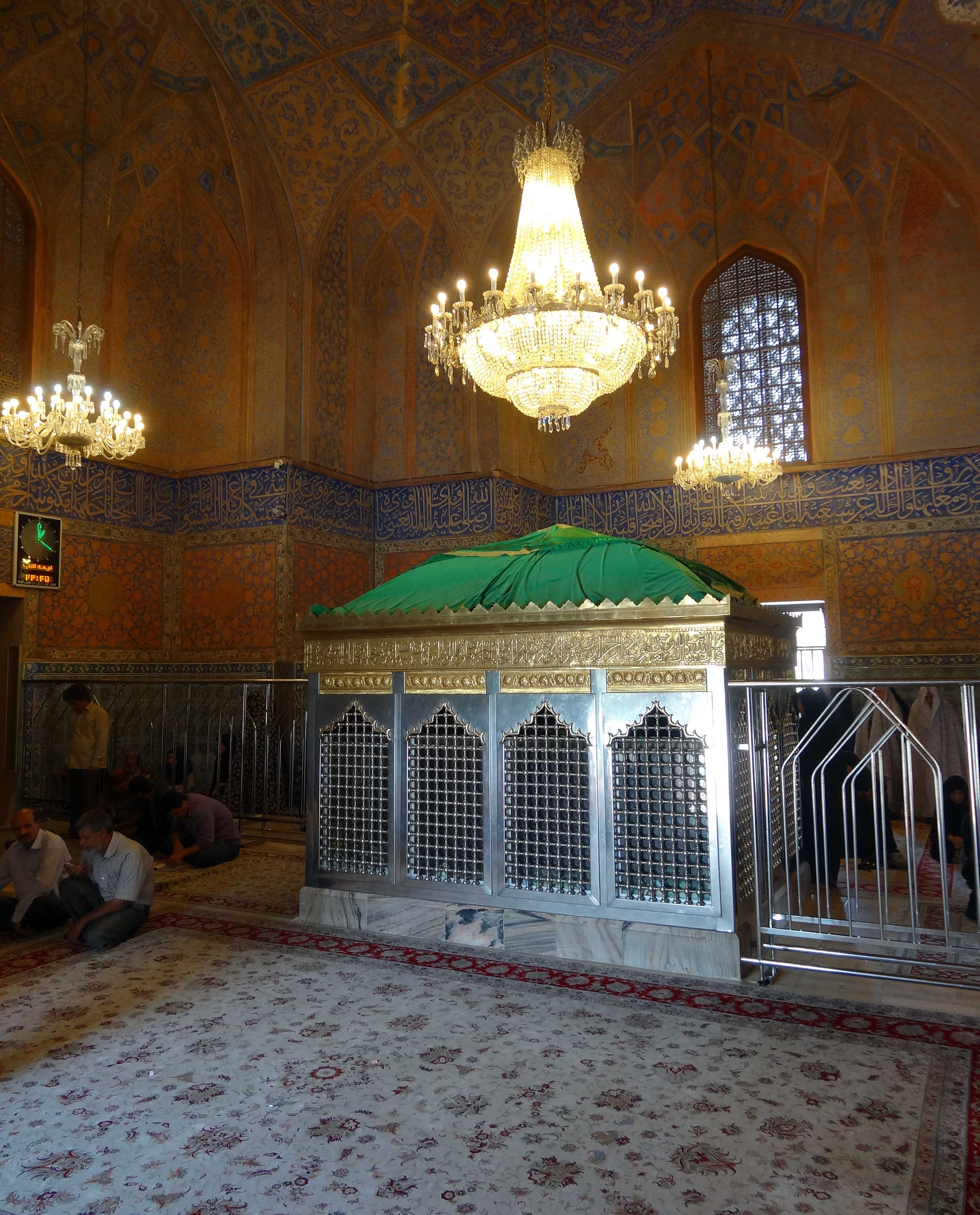

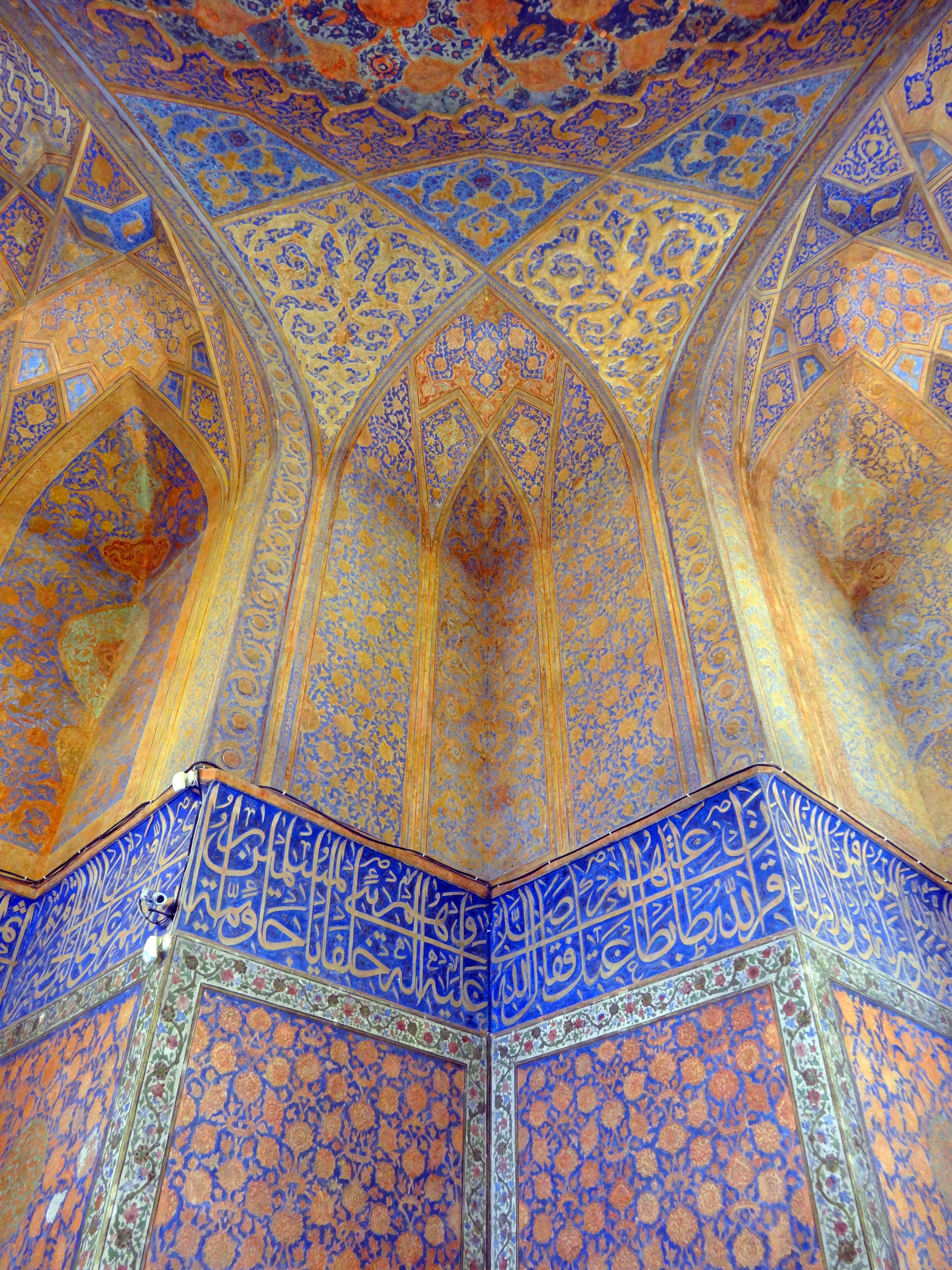

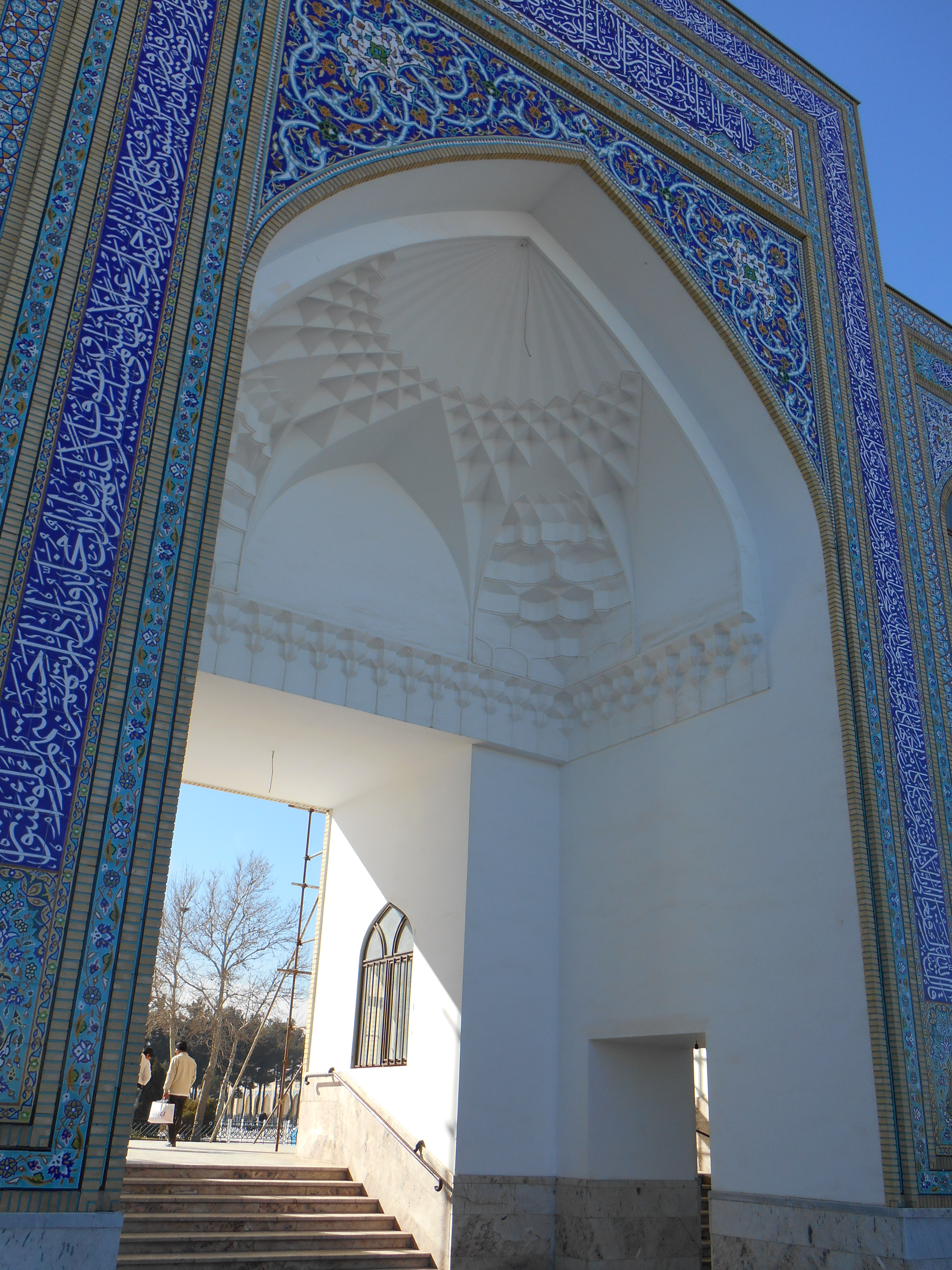

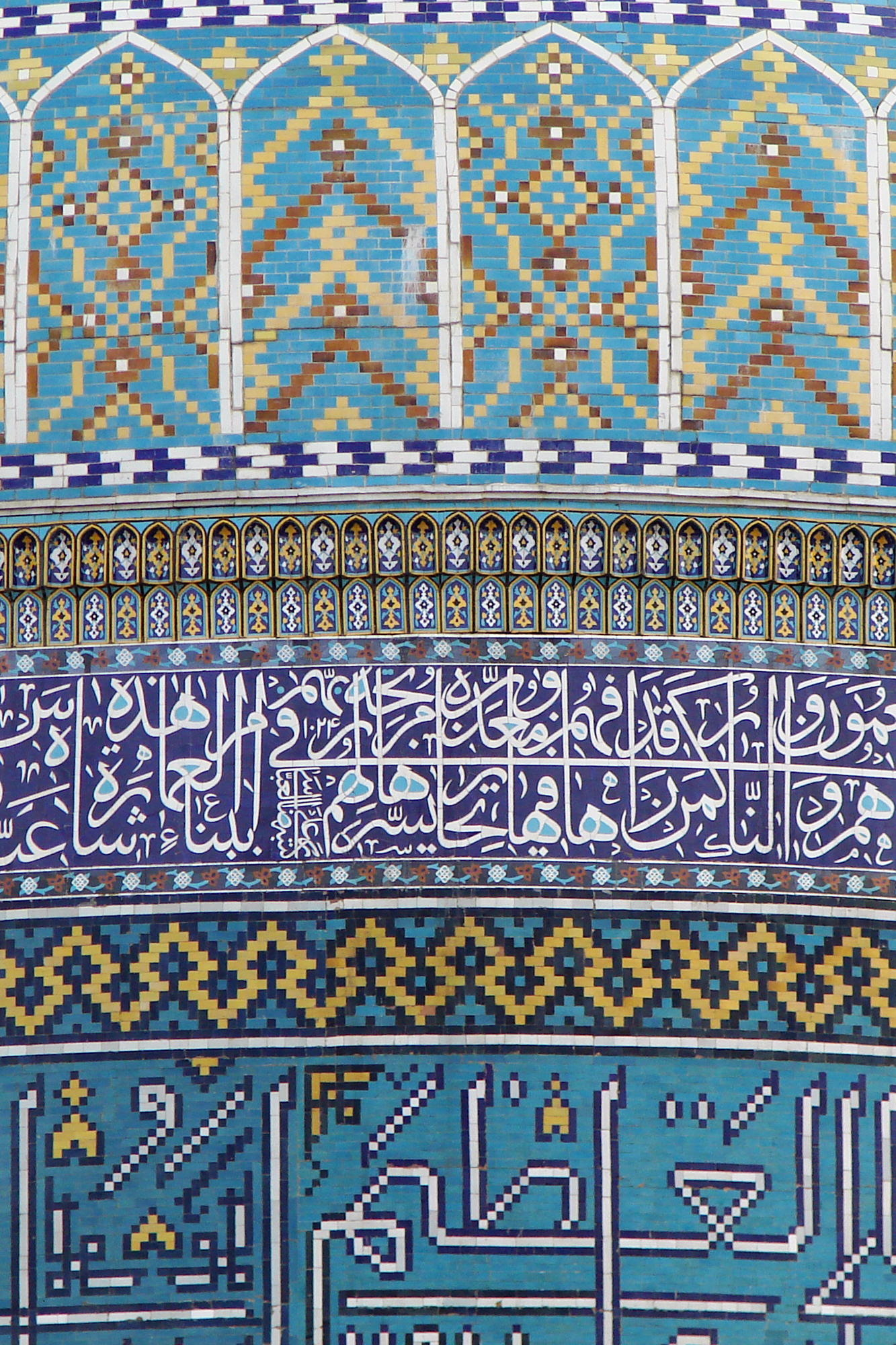

== See also ==
- List of mausoleums in Iran
- Shia Islam in Iran
