= Sufyan al-Thawri =

Muslim scholar, jurist, and ascetic (716–778)

- سُفْيَان ٱلثَّوْرِيّ
- Title: Shaykh of Islam; Imam

Personal life
- Born: 716 CE / 97 AH Khorasan, Umayyad Caliphate
- Died: 778 CE (aged 61–62) / 161 AH (aged 63–64) Basra, Abbasid Caliphate
- Era: Islamic Golden Age
- Region: Kufa
- Main interests: Jurisprudence; asceticism; creed; hadith
- Occupation: Scholar; jurist; theologian; traditionist

Religious life
- Religion: Islam
- Denomination: Sunni
- Jurisprudence: Independent; Founder of the Thawri school

Muslim leader
- Influenced by: Ayyub al-Sikhtiyani; Shu'ba ibn al-Hajjaj; Ja'far al-Sadiq; Malik ibn Anas; Abu Hanifa
- Influenced: Abu Sulayman al-Darani; Ibn al-Mubarak; Sufyan ibn Uyayna; Abd al-Razzaq al-San'ani
- Arabic name
- Personal (Ism): Sufyān سُفْيَان
- Patronymic (Nasab): Ibn Saʿīd ibn Masrūq ibn Ḥamza ibn Ḥabīb ibn Mawhiba ibn Naṣr ibn Thaʿlaba ibn Malakān ibn Thawr ٱبْن سَعِيد بْن مَسْرُوق بْن حَمْزَة بْن حَبِيب بْن مَوْهِبَة بْن نَصْر بْن ثَعْلَبَة بْن مَلَكَان بْن ثَوْر
- Teknonymic (Kunya): Abū ʿAbd Allāh أَبُو عَبْد ٱللَّٰه
- Toponymic (Nisba): Al-Thawrī al-Rabābī al-Tamīmī al-Muḍarī al-Kūfī ٱلثَّوْرِيّ ٱلرَّبَابِيّ ٱلتَّمِيمِيّ ٱلْمُضَرِيّ ٱلْكُوفِيّ

Abū ʿAbd Allāh Sufyān ibn Saʿīd ibn Masrūq ibn Ḥamza al-Thawrī al-Muḍarī al-Kūfī (Arabic: أَبُو عَبْد ٱللَّٰه سُفْيَان بْن سَعِيد بْن مَسْرُوق بْن حَمْزَة ٱلثَّوْرِيّ ٱلْمُضَرِيّ ٱلْكُوفِيّ; 716–778 CE / 97–161 AH), commonly known as Sufyān al-Thawrī (Arabic: سُفْيَان ٱلثَّوْرِيّ), was a Sunni Muslim scholar, jurist, ascetic, traditionist, and eponymous founder of the Thawri school of Islamic jurisprudence, considered one of the Eight Ascetics.

== Biography ==
Sufyan al-Thawri was born in Khorosan. His nisba, al-Thawri, is derived from his ancestor Thawr ibn Abd Manah. He moved to Kufa for his education, and in his youth supported the family of Ali ibn Abi Talib against the Umayyad Caliphate. By 748, he had moved to Basra, where he met Abd Allah ibn Awn and Ayyub al-Sikhtiyani. He also learned some aspects of Shiasm, which he later abandoned. According to Imam al-Dhahabī, he studied with approximately 600 teachers, most of whom narrated from Abū Hurayrah, Jābir, Ibn ʿAbbās and their contemporaries. He also had many students. Abū al-Faraj ibn al-Jawzī mentioned that there were more than 20,000, though al-Dhahabī notes this is exaggerated and unrealistic. al-Thawrī formally studied the Qur'an under Ḥamzah al-Zayyāt and recited it to him in full four times.

It is said the Umayyad authorities offered him high office positions; however, he consistently declined. It is narrated he refused to give to the caliphs moral and religious advice, and when asked why, he responded: "When the sea overflows, who can dam it up?" He was also quoted to have said to a companion of his, "Beware of drawing close and associating with the rulers; do not be deceived by being told that you can drive inequity away. All of this is the deceit of the Devil, which the wicked reciters have taken as a ladder [to self promotion]."

Al-Thawri's jurisprudential thought (usul al-fiqh), after his move to Basra, became more closely aligned to that of the Umayyads and of al-Awza'i.

Ath-Thawri was one of the 'Eight Ascetics,' who included (usual list) Amir ibn Abd al-Qays, Abu Muslim al-Khawlani, Uways al-Qarani, al-Rabi ibn Khuthaym, al-Aswad ibn Yazid, Masruq ibn al-Ajda', and Hasan al-Basri.

Ibn Qayyim al-Jawziyya relates in Madarij al-salikin, and Ibn al-Jawzi in the chapter entitled "Abu Hashim al-Zahid" in his Sifat al-safwa after the early hadith master Abu Nu`aym in his Hilyat al-awliya, that Sufyan al-Thawri said:

"If it were not for Abu Hashim al-Sufi (d. 115) I would have never perceived the presence of the subtlest forms of hypocrisy in the self... Among the best of people is the Sufi learned in jurisprudence."

Ibn al-Jawzi also narrates the following:

Abu Hashim al-Zahid said: "Allah has stamped alienation upon the world in order that the friendly company of the murideen (seekers) consist solely in being with Him and not with the world, and in order that those who obey Him come to Him by means of avoiding the world. The People of Knowledge of Allah (ahl al-ma`rifa billah) are strangers in the world and long for the hereafter."

He spent the last year of his life hiding after a dispute between him and the caliph al-Mahdi. On his death the Thawri madhhab was taken up by his students, including Yahya ibn Sa'id al-Qattan. There are sporadic references to his school in the two centuries after his death; however, it never reached the institutional strength as the four major Sunni schools. His school did not survive, but his juridical thought and especially hadith transmission are highly regarded in Islam, and have influenced all the major schools.

Stories of Sufyan ath-Thawri were also collected in Fariduddin Attar's Tadhkirat al-Awliya, a collection of Sufi hagiographies compiled in the twelfth/thirteenth century.

== Full name ==
His full name is Abū ʿAbd Allāh Sufyān ibn Saʿīd ibn Masrūq ibn Ḥamza ibn Ḥabīb ibn Mawhiba ibn Naṣr ibn Thaʿlaba ibn Malakān ibn Thawr al-Thawrī al-Rabābī al-Tamīmī al-Muḍarī al-Kūfī (أَبُو عَبْد ٱللَّٰه سُفْيَان بْن سَعِيد بْن مَسْرُوق بْن حَمْزَة بْن حَبِيب بْن مَوْهِبَة بْن نَصْر بْن ثَعْلَبَة بْن مَلَكَان بْن ثَوْر ٱلثَّوْرِيّ ٱلرَّبَابِيّ ٱلتَّمِيمِيّ ٱلْمُضَرِيّ ٱلْكُوفِيّ).

== Works ==
Of his books, perhaps best known is his Tafsir of the Qur'an, one of the earliest in the genre. An Indian MSS preserves it up to Q. 52:13, as published by Imtiyâz ʿAlî ʿArshî in 1965; also Tabari's tafsir quotes extensively from the whole text. He also preserved the books of his Umayyad predecessors.

He is also known for writing al-Jāmiʿ al-Kabīr, a compilation of the legal opinions of the Companions, the Tābiʿūn, and the Tābiʿal-Tābiʿīn jurists and it likely included al-Thawrī’s own ijtihād and preference. It is widely compared to the Muwaṭṭaʾ of Malik ibn Anas and is considered one of the earliest examples of the sunan and muṣannaf compilations. Though the book quickly became well known through his students, there is no information indicating that it has survived.

== See also ==
- List of Sufis
- Abu Sulayman al-Darani
