= Al-Masih ad-Dajjal =

Islamic eschatological figure

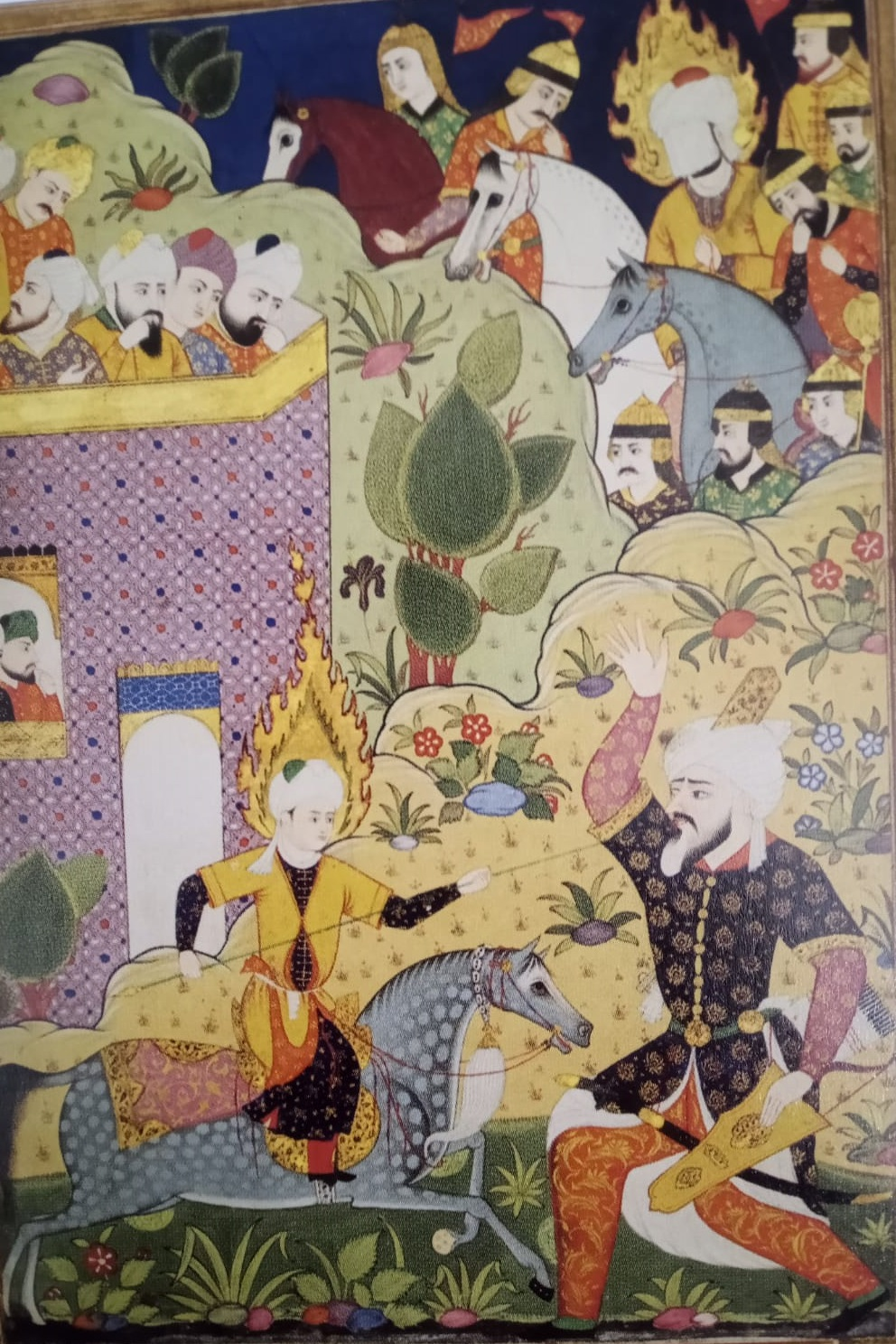
An image from a Falname made in India around 1610–1630 depicts Jesus fighting the Dajjal (right). Behind, the Mahdi with a veiled face.

Al-Masih ad-Dajjal (Arabic: الْمَسِيحُ الدَّجَّالُ, romanized: Al-Masih ad-Dajjal, lit. 'the Deceitful Messiah'), otherwise referred to simply as the Dajjal, is an antagonistic figure in Islamic eschatology who will pretend to be the promised Messiah and later claim to be God, appearing before the Day of Judgment. He will also be one of the 10 major signs according to the Islamic eschatological narrative. The Dajjal is not mentioned in the Quran but is mentioned and described in the Hadith. Corresponding to the Antichrist in Christianity, the Dajjal is said to emerge out in the East although the specific location varies among the various sources.

The Dajjal will imitate the miracles performed by Jesus, such as healing the sick and raising the dead, the latter with the aid of demons. He will deceive many people such as weavers, magicians, and children of fornication.

== Etymology ==
Dajjāl (Arabic: دجّال) is the characteristic noun form of the root word dajl, meaning "lie" or "deception". It also appears in the Syriac (daggāl, ܕܓܠ, 'false, deceitful; spurious'). The compound al-Masīḥ ad-Dajjāl, with the definite article al- ('the'), refers to "the deceiving Messiah", a specific end-time deceiver and is linguistically equivalent to Syriac Christianity's mšīḥā d-daggālūtā (ܡܫܝܚܐ ܕܕܓܠܘܬܐ, 'pseudo-Christ, false Messiah'). This Dajjāl is an evil being who will seek to impersonate the true Messiah (Jesus).

== History ==
In the Quran, the Dajjal and similar figures are absent, but they appear in hadith that are considered sound by Islamic scholarship.

Other apocalyptic narratives were not composed until 150–200 years later; the extensive usage of Hebrew and Syriac vocabulary in those Islamic apocalyptic writings suggests that apocalyptic narratives were adapted from other religious traditions. Much apocalyptic material is attributed to Ka'b al-Ahbar, and other transmitters indicate a Christian background. The first known complete Islamic apocalyptic work is the Kitāb al-Fitan ('Book of Tribulations') by Naim ibn Hammad.

Stories regarding the Dajjal were probably adapted from Eastern Christianity. Many characteristics of the Dajjal, such as anti-Jewish sentiments, are possible remainings of Christian polemic against Jews that were later integrated into Islamic apocalyptic thought. There are additional descriptions of the Dajjal invoking Christian imagery; for example, in one narration the Dajjal is said to be chained in the West, similar to the Beast in the Book of Revelation. As pointed out by David Cook, the popularity of apocalyptic stories then required Muslim authorities to integrate them into the Islamic tradition to retain notability, as the apocalyptic literature competed with the Quran.

Later Islamic apocalyptic narratives were expanded and developed by Islamic authors, notably al-Ghazali, Ibn Arabi, al-Qurtubi, Ibn Kathir and as-Suyuti) and also from the Shia author al-Shaykh al-Mufid. The authors list various signs as meanings of the arrivals of the apocalypse, including extra-Quranic figures such as the Dajjāl and the Mahdi.

== Overview ==
A number of locations are associated with the emergence of the Dajjal, but he is usually said to come from the East. He is usually described as blind in his right eye, with his left eye being green; true believers are said to be able to read the word كافر (Arabic for 'disbeliever') on his forehead. It is believed that many will be deceived by him and join his ranks, among them Jews, Bedouins, weavers, magicians, and children of fornication. Furthermore, he will be assisted by an army of devils (shayāṭīn). Nevertheless, the most reliable supporters will be the Jews, to whom he will be the incarnation of God.

The Dajjal performs miracles, which resemble those performed by ʿĪsā (Jesus) such as healing the sick, raising the dead, causing the earth to grow vegetation, causing livestock to prosper and to die and stopping the sun's movement. The Dajjal is finally defeated and killed by Isa when the latter simply looks at him and, according to some narrations, puts a sword through him.

Dajjal's nature is ambiguous. Although the nature of his birth indicates that the first generations of Muslim apocalyptists regarded him as human, he is also identified in Islamic tradition rather as a devil in human form.

The characteristical one eye is believed to symbolize spiritual blindness. Thus, Dajjal, blind to the immanent aspect of God, can comprehend only the transcendent aspect of God's wrath. Hadiths describe Dajjal as twisting paradise and hell as he will bring his own paradise and hell with him, but his hell will be paradise and his paradise hell.

== Muslim eschatology ==
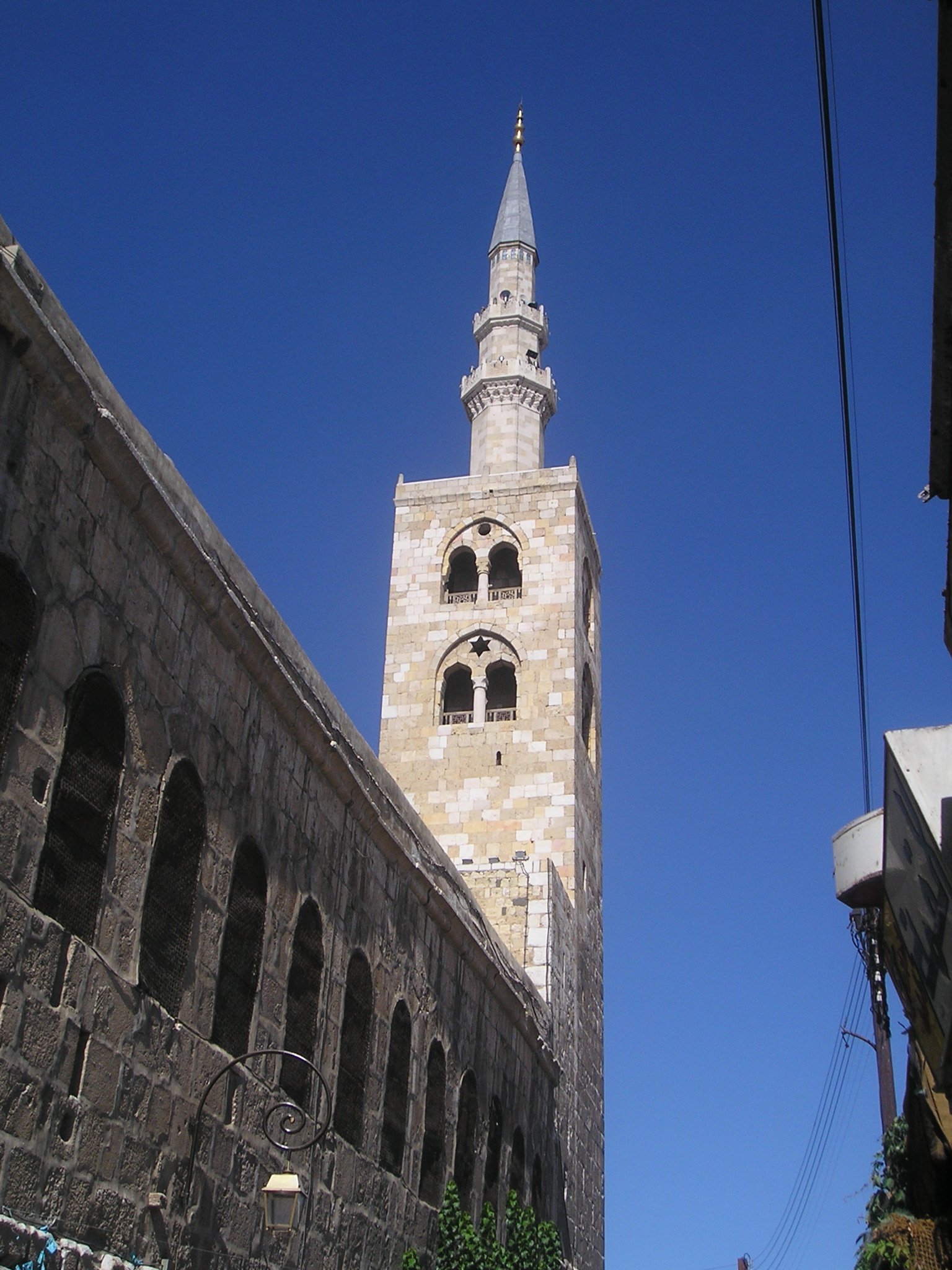
Minaret of Isa on the Umayyad Mosque, in Damascus, Syria, which is thought to be one of the possible places to which ʿĪsā will descend.

=== Sunni eschatology ===
Sunni Islam affirms that Dajjal is an individual man. When he appears, he will stay for 40 days. The first day will be like a year, the second like a month, the third like a week and the rest like normal days.

Sometime after the appearance of Dajjal, ʿĪsā will descend on a white minaret to the east of Damascus, which is thought to be the Minaret of Isa of the Umayyad Mosque, in Damascus, Syria. He will descend from the heavens wearing two garments lightly dyed with saffron and his hands resting on the shoulders of two angels. When he lowers his head, it will seem as if water is flowing from his hair, and when he raises his head, it will appear as if his hair is beaded with silvery pearls. Every disbeliever who smells his odour will die.

According to the Sunni ḥadīth, Dajjal will then be chased to the gate of Lod, where he will be captured and killed by ʿĪsā. ʿĪsā will then break the Christian cross, kill all pigs, abolish the jizya and establish peace among all nations.

==== Ḥadīth literature ====
The following account describes one of the signs of Dajjal's arrival in Sunni eschatology:

Narrated Mu'adh ibn Jabal: The Prophet (ﷺ) said: The flourishing state of Jerusalem will be when Yathrib is in ruins, the ruined state of Yathrib will be when the great war comes, the outbreak of the great war will be at the conquest of Constantinople and the conquest of Constantinople when the Dajjal (Antichrist) comes forth. He (the Prophet) struck his thigh or his shoulder with his hand and said: This is as true as you are here or as you are sitting (meaning Mu'adh ibn Jabal).

Thawban ibn Kaidad narrated that Prophet Muhammad said:

There will be 30 dajjals among my Ummah. Each one will claim that he is a prophet; but I am the last of the Prophets (Seal of the Prophets), and there will be no Prophet after me.

— Related by Ahmad ibn Hanbal as a sound hâdith.

Abu Hurairah narrated that Muhammad said:

The Hour will not be established until two big groups fight each other whereupon there will be a great number of casualties on both sides and they will be following one and the same religious doctrine, until about 30 dajjals appear, and each of them will claim that he is Allah's Apostle...

— Sahih al-Bukhari, Volume 9, Book 88: Afflictions and the End of the World, Hâdith Number 237.

Rasulullah also stated that the last of the dajjals will be the Islamic Antichrist, al-Masih ad-Dajjal (lit. 'the Deceitful Messiah'). The Dajjal is never mentioned in the Quran, but he is mentioned and described in the ḥadīth literature. Like in Christianity, Dajjal is said to emerge out in the East although the specific location varies among the various sources. Dajjal will imitate the miracles performed by ʿĪsā, such as healing the sick and raising the dead, the latter done with the aid of demons (Shayāṭīn). He will deceive many people such as weavers, magicians, half-castes, and children of prostitutes, but most his followers will be Jews. According to the Islamic eschatological narrative, the events related to the final battle before the Day of Judgment will proceed in the following order:

11 Hadith also report on the "Greater Signs" of the end, which include the appearance of the Antichrist (Dajjal) and the reappearance of the prophet Jesus to join in battle with him at Dabbiq in Syria, as well as the arrival of the Mahdī, the "guided one". As another hadith attributed to Alī ibn Abī Talib puts it, "Most of the Dajjal's followers are Jews and children of fornication; God will kill him in Syria, at a pass called the Pass of Afiq, after three hours are gone from the day, at the hand of Jesus".

Jews are prophesied to be followers of the Dajjal, as narrated by Anas bin Malik:

Seventy thousand of the Jews of Isbahan will follow the Dajjal, wearing Tayalisahs.

— Sahih Muslim 2944

Samra ibn Jundab reported that Prophet Muhammad, while delivering a ceremonial speech at an occasion of a solar eclipse, once said:

Verily by Allah, the Last Hour will not come until 30 dajjals will appear and the final one will be the One-eyed False Messiah.

— Related by Imam Ahmed and Imam Tabarani as a sound hâdith.

Anas ibn Malik narrated that Muhammad said:

There is never a prophet who has not warned the Ummah of that one-eyed liar; behold he is one-eyed and your Lord is not one-eyed. Dajjal is blind of one eye On his forehead are the letters k. f. r. (Kafir) between the eyes of the Dajjal which every Muslim would be able to read.

— Sahih Muslim, Book 41: The Book Pertaining to the Turmoil and Portents of the Last Hour, Chapter 7: The Turmoil Would Go Like The Mounting Waves of the Ocean, Ahâdith 7007–7009.

The Mahdi (lit. 'the rightly guided one') is the Redeemer in Islam. Just like the Dajjal, the Mahdi is never mentioned in the Quran, but his description can be found in the ḥadīth literature; according to the Islamic eschatological narrative, he will appear on Earth before the Day of Judgment. At the time of the Second Coming of Christ, the prophet ʿĪsā shall return to defeat and kill al-Masih ad-Dajjal. Muslims believe that both ʿĪsā and the Mahdi will rid the world of wrongdoing, injustice and tyranny and ensure peace and tranquility. Eventually, Dajjal will be killed by the Mahdi and ʿĪsā at the gate of Lod and dissolved slowly like salt in water.

Since the 1980s, popular Islamic writers such as Said Ayyub of Egypt have blamed the forces of Dajjal for the overtaking of the Islamic world by the Western world.

=== Twelver Shīʿa eschatology ===
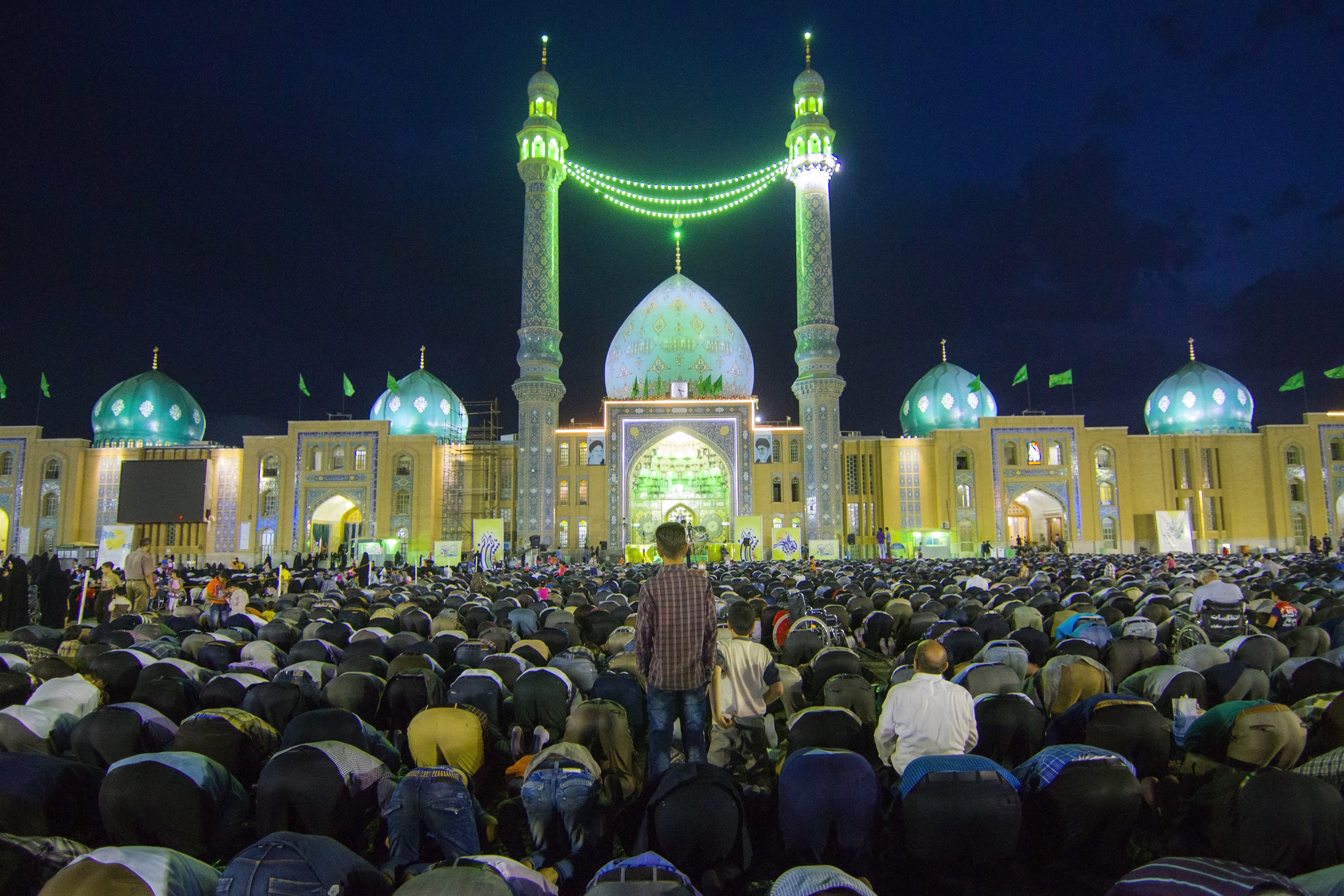
Jamkaran Mosque in Qom, Iran, is a popular pilgrimage site for Shīʿa Muslims. Local belief holds that the twelfth Shīʿīte Imam, the promised Mahdi according to Twelvers, once appeared and offered prayers at Jamkaran.

In the Twelver denomination of Shīʿa Islam, one of the signs of the reappearance of the Mahdi, whom Twelvers consider to be their twelfth Imam from the Ahl al-Bayt ("People of the Household"), is the advent of the Dajjal.

"Whoever denies al-Mahdi has denied God, and whoever accepts al-Dajjal has denied God (turned an infidel)". That Shīʿīte ḥadīth is attributed to Muhammad and strongly emphasises both the return of Dajjal and the reappearance of the Mahdi.

==== Ḥadīth literature ====
The following is a Twelver Shīʿīte ḥadīth on the topic of Dajjal in an excerpt from a longer sermon by ʿAlī ibn Abī Ṭālib:

Narrated Abu Ja'far Muhammad ibn 'Ali ibn Babawayh al-Qummi in Kamal al-din wa tamam al-ni'mah Vol 2, Ch 47, Hadith 1:

Narrated to us Muhammad bin Ibrahim bin Ishaq that he said: Narrated to us Abdul Aziz bin Yahya Jaludi in Basra: Narrated to us Husain bin Maaz: Narrated to us Qais bin Hafs: Narrated to us Yunus bin Arqam from Abi Yasar Shaibani from Zahhak bin Muzahim from Nazaal bin Sabra that he said:

Asbagh bin Nubatah stood up and said: "O Maula! Who would be the Dajjal?" He (Imam Ali) replied: "The name of Dajjal is Saeed bin Saeed. Thus one who supports him is unfortunate. And fortunate are those who deny him. He shall emerge from Yahoodiya village of Isfahan. On his forehead would be inscribed: 'Kafir' (disbeliever) which would readable to the literate as well as the illiterate.

He shall jump into the seas. The Sun will follow him. A mountain of smoke will precede him and a white mountain will follow him, which in times of famine will be mistaken to be a mountain of food (bread). He shall be mounted on a white ash. One step of that ash will be of one mile. Whichever spring or well he reaches, will dry up forever. He will call out aloud which shall be audible to all in the east and the west from the jinns, humans, and satans".

He will tell his followers that he is their Lord. He will be a one-eyed man with human needs, and God has no needs or eyes. Muhammad strongly warned his companions and believers about the deceiving claim. According to a tradition, "Al-Dajjal will verily be given birth by his mother in Qous in Egypt, and there will be thirty years separating between his birth and appearance. Shia reports regarding Isa state that he will descend at the Damascus east gate then he will appear in the East where he will be granted caliphate". A narration by Nu'aym bin Hammad according to the hadith of Jassasah is that "it is reported that he is confined in an abbey or a palace at an island in the Shaam or the Sea of Yemen. Some hadith reports that he will emerge from Khorasan whereas some say that he will appear in a place between the Shaam and Iraq".

People will be deceived by his magic and sorcery for which he will be falsely claimed as the messiah. On the first day of his appearance, 70,000 Jews will follow him. They will be wearing green cap. They consider him as their promised savior, the one who is described in their holy books. The actual cause of their faith will be their animosity with the Muslims. Ja'far al-Sadiq narrates from the Prophet Muhammad that, most of Dajjal's followers will be people from illegitimate relationships, habitual drinkers, singers, musicians, bedouins and women. He will travel all around the world except Mecca and Medina. The earth will be under his control to such an extent that even ruins will turn into treasures, and the earth will sprout vegetation on his command.

As soon as Dajjal descends, he will order a river to flow, return and dry up. The river will follow his command. Even the mountains, clouds and wind will be controlled by him. His followers will thus gradually increase, which will eventually make him proclaim himself as God. A hadith from the Prophet indicates the condition of the world: "Five years prior to the advent of Dajjal there shall be drought and nothing shall be cultivated. Such that all the hoofed animals shall perish". After Dajjal's emergence, the world will be facing acute famine. He will have food and water with him, and many people will accept his claim just for some food and water. He will spread oppression and tyranny all over the world. His main aims will be mischief and testing the people. The one who follows him will be expelled from Islam, and the one who denies him will be the believer.

When the Mahdi reappears, he will appoint Isa (Jesus) as his representative. Isa would attack him and catch him at the gate of Ludd (now Lod, near Tel Aviv, in Israel) According to the narrations of Ali, when the Mahdi returns, he will lead the prayers and Isa will follow him. As soon as Dajjal sees Isa, Dajjal will melt like lead. Ali mentions Dajjal's defeat in one of his sermons and says that Dajjal will set out toward the Hijaz, and Isa will intercept him at the passage of Harsha. Isa will direct a horrible shout at him and strike him a decisive blow. Muhammad al-Baqir narrated that when Dajjal arises, the people will not know about God, which will make it easy for Dajjal to claim himself as God.

=== Ahmadiyya eschatology ===
Prophecies concerning the emergence of Dajjal are interpreted in the Ahmadiyya movement's teachings as designating a specific group of nations centered upon a false theology (or Christology), instead of an individual, with reference to the Dajjal in the singular, which indicates its unity as a system, rather than its personal individuality. In particular, the Ahmadis identify the Dajjal collectively with the missionary expansion and colonial dominance of European Christianity throughout the world, a development that had begun soon after the Muslim conquest of Constantinople during the 15th-century Age of Discovery and accelerated by the Industrial Revolution. As with other eschatological themes, Mirza Ghulam Ahmad, the Ahmadiyya founder, wrote extensively on the topic.

The identification of the Dajjal, principally with colonial missionaries, was drawn by Ghulam Ahmad by linking the hadith traditions about him with certain Quranic passages such as the description in the hadith of the emergence of the Dajjal as the greatest tribulation since the creation of Adam, which was taken in conjunction with the Quran's description of the deification of Jesus as the greatest abomination; the warning only against the putative lapses of the Jews and Christians in al-Fatiha (the principal Islamic prayer) and its absence of any warning specifically against the Dajjal; a prophetic hadith that prescribed the recitation of the opening and closing ten verses of chapter 18 of the Quran, (al-Kahf) as a safeguard against the mischief of the Dajjal, the former of which speak of a people "who assign a son to God" and the latter of those whose lives are entirely given to the pursuit and manufacture of material goods; and descriptions of the period of Dajjal's reign as coinciding with the dominance of Christianity. The attributes of Dajjal as described in the hadith literature are thus taken as symbolic representations and interpreted in a way that would make them compatible with Quranic readings and not compromise God's inimitable attributes in Islam. Dajjal's being blind in his right eye while being sharp and oversized in his left, for example, is indicative of being devoid of religious insight and spiritual understanding but excellent in material and scientific attainment. Similarly, Dajjal's not entering Mecca and Medina is interpreted with reference to the failure of colonial missionaries in reaching both places.

==== Defeat ====
The defeat of Dajjal in Ahmadi Muslim eschatology is to occur by force of argument and the warding off of its mischief through the very advent of the Messiah, rather than through physical warfare, with Dajjal's power and influence gradually disintegrating and ultimately allowing for the recognition and the worship of God, along with Islamic ideals to prevail throughout the world in a period similar to the period of time it took for nascent Christianity to rise through the Roman Empire (see Seven Sleepers). In particular, the teaching that Jesus was a mortal man who survived crucifixion and died a natural death, as propounded by Ghulam Ahmad, has been seen by some scholars as a move to neutralise Christian soteriologies of Jesus and to project the superior rationality of Islam. The 'gate of Lud' (Bāb al-Ludd) spoken of in the hadith literature as the site that Dajjal is to be slain (or captured) is understood in that context as indicating the confutation of Christian proclaimants by way of disputative engagement in light of the Quran (19:97). The hadith has also been exteriorly linked with Ludgate, London, the westernmost point that Paul of Tarsus, who is widely believed by Muslims to be the principal corrupter of Jesus' original teachings, is thought to have preached according to the Sonnini Manuscript of the Acts of the Apostles and other ecclesiastical works predating its discovery. Upon his arrival in London in 1924, Ghulam Ahmad's son and second Successor, Mirza Bashir-ud-Din Mahmud proceeded directly to the site and led a lengthy prayer outside the entrance of St Paul's Cathedral before he laid the foundation for a mosque in London.

== See also ==
- Saf ibn Sayyad
- Hadith of Najd
- Sufyani
- Djall
- Antichrist
- Armilus
- Davidic line – Lineage of the Israelite king David
