= Mujahid ibn Jabr =

Islamic scholar (642-722)

- Born: c. 642; Mecca, Rashidun Caliphate
- Died: c. 722 (aged 79-80); Mecca, Umayyad Caliphate

Philosophical work
- Era: Medieval era

Abū l-Ḥajjāj Mujāhid ibn Jabr al-Qāriʾ (Arabic: مُجَاهِدُ بْنُ جَبْرٍ) (642–722 CE) was a Tabi' and one of the major early Islamic scholars.

According to some sources, Mujahid wrote a tafsīr of the Qur'an (exegesis/commentary), although it is likely that a written work from his time never existed. The text that is called Tafsir Mujahid today was first compiled by Ādam ibn Abī Iyās (d. 836–837 CE), and Adam transmits traditions to Mujahid through the intermediary chain of transmission Warqāʾ — Ibn Abī Najīḥ. Adam's collection also does not survive, but rather, Ibn Shādhān's (d. after 1033 CE) recension of ʿAbd al-Raḥmān's recension of Ibrāhīm's recension of Adam’s collection is what survives. Up to seven other versions of traditions attributed to Mujahid survive, some of which vary substantially with the Tafsir Mujahid.

== Biography ==
His full nickname is often written as "Mujahid bin Jabir, Maula As-Saib bin Abi As-Saib, Al-Makhzumi, Al-Quraysh". The Nisba of al-Makhzumi were because he was a servant (mawla) of someone from the Banu Makhzum tribe.

Mujahid is said to have studied under Amir al-Mu'minin 'Ali ibn Abi Talib until his martyrdom. At that point, he began to study under Ibn Abbas, a companion of Muhammad known as the father of Qur'anic exegesis. Mujahid ibn Jabr was known to be willing to go to great lengths to discover the true meaning of a verse in the Qur'an, and was considered to be a well-travelled man. However, there is no evidence he ever journeyed outside of the Arabian Peninsula.

== Works ==
It is related by Ibn Sa'd in the Tabaqat (6:9) and elsewhere that he went over the explanation of the Qur'an together with Ibn 'Abbas thirty times.

Mujahid ibn Jabr is said to be relied upon in terms of tafsir according to Sufyan al-Thawri, who said: "If you get Mujahid's tafsir, it is enough for you."

His exegesis in general followed these four principles:

1. That the Qur'an can be explained by other parts of the Qur'an. For example, in his interpretation of Q 29:13, he refers to Q 16:25,
2. Interpretation according to traditions,
3. Reason,
4. Literary comments.

Al-Tabari's Jami' al-bayan attributes a significant amount of exegetical material to Mujahid.

== Legacy ==
=== The view of Islamic Scholarship ===
He has been classed as a Thiqah (i.e. very reliable) hadith narrator.

Al-A'mash said:

Mujahid was like someone who carried a treasure: whenever he spoke, pearls came out of his mouth.

After praising him in similar terms al-Dhahabi said: "The Ummah is unanimous on Mujahid being an Imam who is worthy in Ihtijaj.

== See also ==
- Qira'at
- Ahruf
- Ten recitations
- Seven readers
