= Aswad (disambiguation) =

Aswad may refer to:

- Aswad, a British reggae group
- Aswad (name), a male Arabic given name that means "black"
- Hajarul Aswad, the black stone in the center of the Grand Mosque in Mecca
- Tell Aswad, an archaeological site near Damascus in Syria
- Association for the Study of the Worldwide African Diaspora (ASWAD)
