= Tafsir Mujahid =

7th-century Quranic study by Mujahid ibn Jabr

- Author: Mujahid ibn Jabr
- Original title: تفسير مجاهد
- Language: Arabic
- Subject: Quranic exegesis
- Genre: Islamic theology
- Publication date: 7th century
- Publication place: Mekkah

Tafsir Mujahid (Arabic: تفسير مجاهد) is a Sunni tafsir by the Tabi' Mujahid ibn Jabr, and is among the earliest and most significant works of Qur'anic interpretation (tafsir).

Mujahid was a prominent student of Abdullah ibn Abbas, the renowned companion of the Islamic prophet Muhammad and an authority in Qur'anic exegesis. Mujahid reportedly reviewed the Qur'an and its meanings with Ibn Abbas multiple times, which cemented his position as one of the foremost scholars of tafsir in the early Islamic period. For this reason, his interpretation was relied upon by scholars such as Al-Shafi'i and Al-Bukhari, among others. In the Book of Tafsir from Sahih al-Bukhari, we find that Al-Bukhari frequently cites tafsir from Mujahid. The statements of the early generations Salaf have widely affirmed that Mujahid was one of the most knowledgeable of the Tabi'in in interpreting the Quran.

The book follows the order of the chapters (surahs) and verses of the Qur'an. However, it does not provide any interpretation for Surah Al-Fatiha or Al-Kafirun. At first glance, it becomes apparent that the tafsir is not comprehensive in scope. Instead, it offers linguistic clarification of the meanings of certain verses using concise expressions, along with references to some legal deductions (fiqh) that were later adopted by jurists in their respective schools of thought. It also touches on some theological discussions that subsequently became foundational for certain scholars in their theological discourse.

== See also ==
- List of Sunni books
- List of tafsir works
