= Aswad (name) =

- Gender: Male
- Language: Arabic

Origin
- Meaning: black

Aswad is a masculine Arabic given name and surname that means "black" (also used for people of black complexion). Notable people with the name include:

== Given name ==
- Al-Aswad al-Ansi (died 632), Arab tribal leader
- Aswad Thomas (born 1989), English footballer
- Aswad ibn Yazid, narrator of hadith

== Surname ==
- Abdulrazzaq Aswad (1918–2002), Iraqi military leader and governor
- Abu al-Aswad ad-Du'ali (603–688/89), Arab grammarian
- Ali Aswad al-Jiburi (died 2016), Iraqi ISIS commander
- Bill Aswad (1922–2015), American politician
- Evelyn Aswad, American legal scholar
- Fatima bint Al-Aswad, companion of the Islamic prophet Muhammad
- Isa ibn Mazyad al-Aswad (died 772), Arab ruler
- Kamil Al-Aswad (born 1994), Bahraini footballer
- Khashkhash Ibn Saeed Ibn Aswad, Andalusian navigator
- Mahmoud Al Aswad (born 2003), Syrian footballer
- Miqdad ibn Aswad, companion of the Islamic prophet Muhammad
- Omar Al-Aswad, Libyan politician
- Radwa El Aswad (born 1974), Egyptian writer
- Wathiq Aswad (born 1957), Iraqi footballer
- Ziad Abderrazzak Mohammad Aswad (born 1952), former government minister in Iraq

== Other uses ==
Other uses of the word include:

- Al-Abd Al-Aswad, a form of torture noted in Syria
- Hajarul Aswad, the Black Stone at the Kaaba in Mecca
- Aswad, British reggae group
- Association for the Study of the Worldwide African Diaspora (ASWAD)
- أيلول الأسود (aylūl al-aswad), Black September.

== See also ==
- Arabic name
