= Shaikh Habib Al-Raee =

7th-century Sufi Shaikh

Habib Al-Raee

Personal life
- Born: Euphrates, Syria
- Died: Euphrates, Syria
- Flourished: 7th-century
- Children: Suffi Haleem Al-Raee (son)
- Parent: Saleem Al-Raee (father)

Religious life
- Religion: Islam
- Denomination: Sufism

Muslim leader
- Based in: Euphrates, Syria, present-day Iraq
- Predecessor: Salman Farsi

Suffi Habib Al-Raee (Urdu: حبیب الراعی) was an elevated Sufi saint. He was a companion to Salman Farsi. His father, Suffi Saleem Al-Raee, was the founder and the chief ancestor of the Arain tribe. He related that Muhammad said, “The believer’s intentions are better than his acts.” He had flocks of sheep and his home was on the bank of the Euphrates. His religious path was retirement from this world.

== Miracles ==
A certain suffi relates as follows, “Once I passed by him and found him praying, while a wolf looked after his sheep. I resolved to pay him a visit since he appeared to me to have the marks of greatness. When we had exchanged greetings, I said,”O Suffi ! I see the wolf in accord with the sheep.” He replied, “That is because the shepherd is in accord with God.” With those words he held a wooden bowl under a rock and two fountains gushed from the rock: one of milk and the other of honey. ‘O Suffi!’ I cried, as he bade me drink, ‘how hast thou attained to this degree?’He answered,”By obedience to Muhammad, the Apostle of God. O my son! The rock gave water to the people of Moses, although they disobeyed him, and although Moses is not equal in rank to Muhammad: why should not the rock give milk and honey to me, inasmuch as I am obedient to Muhammad, who is superior to Moses?’ I said, “Give me a word of counsel.” He said, “Do not make your heart a coffer of covetousness and your belly a vessel of unlawful things.”

== Spiritual Lineage ==
Shaikh Habib Al-Raee was a Tabieen i.e. he was a follower of the Companions of Muhammad.

1. Muhammad
2. Suleman Farsi
3. Shaikh Habib Al-Raee

== Ancestral Lineage ==
The ancestral lineage of Shaikh Habib Al-Raee is as follows:

1. Fehr Quraysh/Fihr ibn Malik
2. Ghalib (patronymic Abu Teem-name Aamir)
3. Loee
4. Qais
5. Umar
6. Mugheera
7. Abdul Dar
8. Haris
9. Shaikh Saleem Al-Raee
10. Shaikh Habib Al-Raee

Shaikh Haleem Al-Raee was the son of Shaikh Habib Al-Raee and migrated with Muhammad bin Qasim in his campaign in Sindh, setting the basis of settlement in South Asia of the Jericho Arabs from which the Arain tribe of Punjab originates.

== See also ==
- Tabieen
- Taba al-Tabi‘in
- Sahaba
