= Al-Darani =

Basil of the Hearts Abu Sulayman al-Darani
- Born: 140 AH = 757 AD; Wasit or Darayya
- Hometown: Wasit
- Residence: Damascus
- Died: 205 AH = 820 AD; 215 AH = 830 AD; Buried in Darayya
- Venerated in: Sunni Islam
- Influences: Sufyan al-Thawri, 'Abd al-Wahid ibn Zaid
- Influenced: Al-Junayd

Abū Sulaymān al-Dārānī (Arabic: أبو سليمان الداراني) was an ascetic sage of the 2nd–3rd/8th–9th century and one of the earliest theoreticians of formal mysticism in Islam.

He was held in honour by the Sufis and was called the "Sweet Basil of Hearts" (Rayhān al-Qulūb). He is distinguished by his austerities and acts of self-mortification. He spoke in subtle terms concerning the practice of devotion. He developed the doctrine of gnosis (ma'rifa), and he was also the first to preach the science of 'time' (waqt) as essential for preserving one's state (hal) and allow hope to predominate over fear.

== Name ==
'Abd al-Rahman b. Ahmad, or 'Abd al-Rahman b. 'Atiyya al-Ansari al-Darani. He was called al-Ansari due to his connection with the Banū Anas ibn Malik, a tribe from Yemen.

== Birth ==
He was born around 140/757 in a village in Damascus called Darayya, and hence he was known as al-Dārānī. Ibn Kathir praised him in his al-Bidaya wa al-Nihaya, and said he was originally from Wasit, but travelled and lived in Damascus.

== Death ==
He died in 205/820 or 215/830 and was buried in the village of Darayya in Damascus.

== Quotes ==
Many of his sayings are purely mystical in spirit and expression. Among his sayings are:

- "Rather, there is on my heart a conceit from the conceits of the people of those days, and nothing will turn my heart [away from such issues] except through two just testimonies: the book [of God] and the Sunnah [of the prophet Muḥammad].”
- "None refrains from the lusts of this world save him in whose heart there is a light that keeps him always busied with the next world."
- "Whenever a man on account of his actions is in despair of his future welfare, that despair shows him the way to salvation and happiness and Divine mercy. It opens to him the door of joy, purges away sensual corruption from his heart, and reveals to it Divine mysteries."
- "Whoever fills his stomach will have seven diseases: losing the sweetness of invocation, being unable to memorize the wisdom, losing sympathy with the creatures, if he is full he thinks that everybody else is, heaviness to worship, increase in lusts, and that while the rest of the believers go to the mosques, the full people go around the garbage dumpsters."
- "The origin of every good in this world and the Hereafter is fear of Allah; the key to the dunya is satiety; and the key to the Hereafter is hunger."
- "Never does fear part ways with a heart except that the heart is ruined."
- "Someone saw Abu Sulayman al-Darani in a dream and asked him: “What did God do to you?” He answered: “He pardoned me. Nothing did more harm to me than the allegorical allusions of the Sufis!”

== See also ==
- List of Sufis
