= Hadith of pen and paper =

Event shortly before Muhammad's death

The hadith of pen and paper (Arabic: حديث القلم والورقة, romanized: hadīth al-qalam wa'l-waraqa) was when the Islamic prophet Muhammad wished to issue a written statement, shortly before his death, but was prevented from doing so. Muhammad's intentions are debated, though it is commonly believed that the statement would have formally designated his successor. Possibly because of its ramifications throughout the history of Islam, some have referred to this incident as the Calamity of Thursday (Note: Named such as it possibly occurred on a Thursday.) (Arabic: رزية يوم الخميس, romanized: raziyat yawm al-khamīs).

== Narration ==
=== Muhammad's request ===
Muhammad became ill in 11 AH (632 CE). His condition worsened reportedly on a Thursday, when he asked for writing materials so that he would "write something, after which you will not be led into error," as related on the authority of Ibn Abbas in the canonical Sunni hadith collection Sahih al-Bukhari.

=== Umar's objection ===
In Sahih al-Bukhari, the account continues that one of Muhammad's companion, Umar, protested, "The illness has overwhelmed the prophet. We have the book of God [Quran] and that is enough for us." According to Miskinzoda, in another report by the Sunni Ibn Sa'd (d. 230/845), Umar instead told those present that Muhammad was raving, as noted also by Madelung. In another report by Ibn Sa'd, transmitted similarly by the Sunni al-Tabari (d. 310/923), Muhammad was told he was delirious. However, this second report is silent about who made this comment. The Sunni Ibn Kathir (d. 774/1373) removes Umar from his report altogether, possibly fearing a negative portrayal of Umar, suggests Miskinzoda.

=== Quarrel ===
The Sahih al-Bukhari's report says a quarrel then broke out at Muhammad's bedside. According to Ibn Sa'd, in his most detailed report, some suggested that his orders should be followed, while others sided with Umar in disregarding the prophet's request. As the noise and quarrel increased, Muhammad asked them to leave, and did not write anything. In one of Ibn Sa'd's reports, Muhammad's wives demand that his request be fulfilled, but are silenced by Umar. Another report of him identifies Muhammad's wife, Zaynab bint Jahsh, as the one making this demand. Ibn Abbas is quoted in the Sahih al-Bukhari as saying, "The greatest of all calamities is what intervened between the Apostle and his writing." Some reports instead attribute similar words to Ubayd Allah ibn Abd Allah. The phrase 'al-raziyya kull al-raziyya' is sometimes used in reference to this event.

=== Muhammad's reaction ===
Al-Bukhari (d. 256/870) and Ibn Sa'd both mention that Muhammad was saddened by the quarrel (wa ghammu rasul Allah), while the Sunni al-Diyarbakri (d. c. 960s/1550s) suppresses this matter in his report but retains Umar's name. In one of Ibn Sa'd's reports, Muhammad reprimanded, "They [the women] are better than you are," after Umar silenced Muhammad's wives who were asking the men to fulfill the prophet's wish.

=== Muhammad's recommendations ===
Some reports add that Muhammad left three oral instructions in place of a written statement, though they have been recorded differently by various authors. One report by Ibn Sa'd lists two of these instructions as driving out the polytheists from Arabia and accepting delegations in the same manner as Muhammad had done. The third recommendation is absent, possibly forgotten by his source. The Shia Tabarsi (d. 548/1153) reports that the third (missing) instruction was about Muhammad's family, the Ahl al-Bayt (lit. 'people of the house'). In his account, Muhammad was later asked if he still wished to write something and he replied:

No, not after what you have said! Rather, keep well my memory through kindness to the people of my household. Treat with kindness the people of dhimmah [namely, Jews and Christians], and feed the poor and ma malakat aymanukum [slaves].

Yet another report by Ibn Sa'd on the authority of Muhammad's cousin and son-in-law Ali lists the three instructions as prayer, zakat (Islamic alms), and (kindness to) ma malakat aymanukum (slaves).

== Debates ==
There is no absence of speculation among scholars about what Muhammad intended to write. Shia scholars suggest that it would have been a formal appointment of Ali as the new leader, while Sunni authorities have advanced various alternatives.

=== Disobedience ===
Noting that it was Umar who prevented Muhammad from writing his will, the Sunni Ibn Hazm (d. 456/1064) suggests that he only meant good (arada bi-ha al-khayr). He also claims that others present agreed with Umar and that the prophet's will must have had no religious significance. Otherwise, he says, Muhammad would have insisted on writing it. The Sunni al-Halabi (d. 1044/1635) similarly suggests that Umar only wanted to ease the prophet's task (innama qala dhalika takhfifan ala rasul Allah).

=== Designation of Abu Bakr ===
Beginning with al-Baladhuri (d. 892), many Sunni authors have presented the first caliph Abu Bakr as the designated successor, which Muhammad intended to put into writing on his deathbed. In one of al-Baladhuri's reports, Muhammad clearly says so, adding that his writing would prevent discord among Muslims. There is also no mention of Umar and Ali in al-Baladhuri's reports and the focus is on Abu Bakr and his daughter Aisha.

The accounts of al-Halabi and Ibn Hazm are similar to that of al-Baladhuri. Al-Halabi relates from Aisha with no further chain of transmission, while Ibn Hazm also expresses his regret about this missed opportunity to designate Abu Bakr, which would have prevented so much bloodshed after Muhammad, in his view.

Ibn Kathir goes further and presents a highly polemic account of Muhammad's death, adding that he designated Abu Bakr as his successor in his last sermon, an important announcement for which he had to purify himself first. The general Sunni belief today is that Muhammad did not appoint a successor. Al-Tabari only quotes two short reports about the pen and paper incident.

=== Designation of Ali ===
In Shia sources, the incident is viewed as a calamity and a missed opportunity to designate Ali as the successor. For instance, the report of al-Mufid (d. 413/1022) emphasizes Umar's disobedience and that it displeased Muhammad, who verbally reiterated Ali's rights on his deathbed. His account matches the Sunni narrative, according to Miskinzoda, except for the part about Ali.

Madelung quotes an exchange between Ibn Abbas and Umar in which the latter claimed that Muhammad intended to name Ali as his successor and that he prevented this out of the conviction that Arabs would revolt against Ali. A tradition to this effect is also cited by the Shia Tababatai (d. 1981). This view has been echoed by Hazleton.

=== Community politics ===
In Sunni Islam, this hadith has also been linked to the rise of the community politics that followed Muhammad's death. By not leaving a will, it is argued, Muhammad had implicitly accepted how the Muslim community (umma) would function after his death. This hadith has thus been linked to the emergence of the Sunni tradition, "My umma will never agree on an error," an idea perpetuated by the Sunni theologians Ibn Hazm and Ibn Sayyid al-Nas (d. 734/1334), among others. Madelung alternatively argues that the Quran advises the faithful to settle some matters by consultation, but the succession of prophets is not one of them. That matter is settled by divine selection for the past prophets in the Quran, he writes.

=== Muhammad's authority ===
For Miskinzoda, the focal point of the story is the question of Muhammad's religious authority, exemplified by Umar's statement, "You have the Quran, the book of God is sufficient for us." In her view, these traditions imply that the Quran is sufficient for the guidance of Muslims after Muhammad. In contrast, Hazleton notes that the Quran has been supplemented by the prophetic practice (Sunna). Shia Muslims add to these the practice of their Imams, citing the widely-reported Hadith al-Thaqalayn, in which Muhammad asks Muslims to seek guidance after him from the Quran and his family, the Ahl al-Bayt.

== See also ==
- Succession to Muhammad
- Saqifah
- Hadith of the Twelve Successors

== Bibliography ==
- Hazleton, Lesley (2009). After the Prophet: The epic story of the Shia-Sunni split in Islam. Knopf Doubleday Publishing Group. ISBN 9780385532099.
- Madelung, Wilferd (1997). The succession to Muhammad: A study of the early caliphate. Cambridge University Press. p. 41. ISBN 9780521646963.
- Miskinzoda, Gurdofarid (2014). "The Story of Pen and Paper and its interpretation in Muslim Literary and Historical Tradition". In Farhad Daftary (ed.). The Study of Shiʿi Islam: History, Theology and Law. The Study of Shi‘i Islam: History, Theology and Law. I.B.Tauris. ISBN 978-0-85773-529-4.
- Campo, Juan Eduardo (2009). Encyclopedia of Islam. Infobase Publishing. ISBN 9781438126968.
- Mavani, Hamid (2013). Religious Authority and Political Thought in Twelver Shi'ism: From Ali to Post-Khomeini. Routledge. ISBN 9780415624404.
- Momen, Moojan (1985). An introduction to Shi'i Islam. Yale University Press. ISBN 9780300035315.
- Abbas, Hassan (2021). The Prophet's Heir: The Life of Ali ibn Abi Talib. Yale University Press. ISBN 9780300252057.
- Tabatabai, Sayyid Mohammad Hosayn (1975). Shi'ite Islam. Translated by Sayyid Hossein Nasr. State University of New York Press. ISBN 0-87395-390-8.
- Keaney, Heather N. (2009). "caliph (Arabic: khalifa, deputy, vicegerent)". In Campo, Juan E. (ed.). Encyclopedia of Islam. Facts On File. pp. 125–6. ISBN 978-0-8160-5454-1.
