= Abd Allah ibn al-Mubarak =

Islamic hadith scholar and jurist (726–797)

Amir al-Mu'minin fi al-Hadith; Abd Allah Ibn al-Mubarak
- عَبْد اللَّه ٱبْن الْمُبَارَك

Personal life
- Born: c. 726 Merv Umayyad Caliphate
- Died: 797 (aged 70–71) Hit, Abbasid Caliphate
- Era: Islamic Golden Age
- Region: Caliphate
- Notable work: Kitab al-Zuhd wa al-Raqaiq

Religious life
- Religion: Islam
- Jurisprudence: Hanafi

Muslim leader
- Teacher: Abu Hanifa; Sufyan al-Thawri

Abū ʿAbd al-Raḥmān Abd Allah ibn al-Mubarak (Arabic: عَبْد اللَّه ٱبْن الْمُبَارَك, romanized: ʿAbd Allāh ibn al-Mubārak; c. 726–797) was an 8th-century traditionalist Sunni Muslim scholar and Hanafi jurist. Known by the title Amir al-Mu'minin fi al-Hadith, he is considered a pious Muslim known for his memory and zeal for knowledge who was a muhaddith and was remembered for his asceticism.

== Life ==
His father, named Mubarak, was of Indian or Turkic descent from Khurasan and became a Mawla or "client" of an Arab trader from the tribe of Banī Hanẓala in the city of Hamadhān. His mother was said to have been from Khwārizm. Mubarak later married Hind, a trader's daughter. Ibn al-Mubarak was born during the reign of Umayyad caliph Hisham ibn Abd al-Malik.

It is said that ʿAbdullāh left his hometown of Merv, and while living in Hamadhān, went on to visit and speak often in Baghdad. Ahmad ibn Hanbal commented that there was no one more eager to travel to seek knowledge than Abdullah ibn Mubarak. His teachers included Sufyān al-Thawrī and Abū Hanīfa. He wrote Kitāb al-Jihād, a collection of hadīth and sayings of the early Muslims on war, and Kitāb al-Zuhd wa al-Rāqa’iq, a book on asceticism. Ibn al-Mubarak is also one of the leading poets of his era. His poems are rather about zuhd, jihad, and the life of the religious elders. He was also known as a mutaṭawwiʿ defending Islamic borders on the frontiers of Tarsus and al-Massisah. He was born at Marw in the year 118 (A.D. 736). He died in 797 at Hīt, near the Euphrates, during the reign of Harun al-Rashid. He studied jurisprudence under Sufyān al-Thawrī, and Malik Ibn Anas from whom he learned by heart the Muwatta, and then taught it to others. He was the first scholar to give the hadiths in the Khorasan region, where many great scholars grew up, especially in Merv, is one of the reasons that increase the fame of Ibn al-Mubarak.

== Works ==
Described as a prolific writer, his works, most are now lost, include:

- Kitab al-Arba'een – كتاب اﻷرﺑﻌﻴﻦ
- Kitab al-Jihad – كتاب الجهاد
- Kitab al-Isti'dhan – كتاب الإستئذان
- Kitab al-Birr & al-Silah – كتاب البر والصلة (Book on the virtues of piety, etiquettes and keeping ties)
- Kitab al-Tarikh – كتاب اﻟﺘﺎرﻳﺦ (Book on History)
- Kitab al-Daqa'iq fi al-Raqa'iq – كتاب الدﻗﺎﺋﻖ في اﻟﺮﻗﺎﺋﻖ (Book on the heart-softeners)
- Kitab Riqa' al-Fatawa – كتاب رقاع اﻟﻔﺘﺎوى (Book on Islamic verdicts)
- Kitab al-Zuhd wa al-Raqaiq – كتاب اﻟﺰهﺪ واﻟﺮﻗﺎﻖ
- Kitab al-Sunan fil-Fiqh – كتاب اﻟﺴﻨﻦ ﻓﻲ اﻟﻔﻘﻪ
- Kitab al-Musnad – كتاب المسند
- Kitab Tafsir al-Qur'an – كتاب تفسير القرآن
