= Yahya ibn Sa'd =

Yahya ibn Sa'd (Arabic: يحيى بن سعد) is one of the more prominent Tabi'een.

He has narrated the Hadith of the door to knowledge.
