= Abd al-Wahid ibn Zaid =

Iraqi Sufi saint (died 711)

Abdul Wahid

Personal life
- Died: AH 177/794 CE Basra, Iraq
- Resting place: Iraq
- Flourished: Islamic golden age

Religious life
- Religion: Islam
- Denomination: Sunni
- School: Hanafi

Muslim leader
- Predecessor: Hasan al-Basri
- Successor: Al-Fuḍayl ibn ‘Iyāḍ
- Influenced: Abu Sulayman al-Darani

'Abd al-Wahid ibn Zaid (Arabic عبد الواحد بن زید) also known as Abdul Wahid bin Zayd, has been quoted in Fazail-e-Sadaqat as great early Sufi Sheikh. He is also reported to have received education from Imam Abu Hanifah, before being initiated full-time as a Sufi by Hasan al-Basri. It is narrated that Abdulwahid ibn Zayd died in 170 or 177 AH. Since he was a student of Hasan-i Basri, Zehebi says that Abdulwahid ibn Zayd died before these dates. According to him, the person who died in 177 was Abdulwahid ibn Ziyad and due to the similarity of names, it is narrated that Abdulwahid ibn Zayd also died in this date. According to Zehebi, Abdulwahid ibn Zayd died after 155. In order for someone who died in 177 to benefit from Basri, who died in 110, he had to live a long life. It is not stated in the sources that Abdulwahid lived a life longer than the average human life. Therefore, Zehebi seems to be right and it seems more consistent that Abdulvahid b. Zeyd died in 155-160.. His shrine is in Basrah, Iraq.

== Biography ==
He is known by the titles of Shaykh al-Ubbad (Shaykh of servants of God) and Shaykh al-Sufiyya (Shaykh of the Sufis). He is famous for his legends about zuhd. It is rumored that he met Hasan-i Basri and that he was his student. Although Attar of Nishapur mentions Abdul Wahid to be a contemporary of Yusuf bin Husayn al-Razi (d. 304 AH/916 AD) and states that he repented in his assembly, this does not seem to be true.

Abdul Wahid is one of the "weeping ascetics" of Basra. It is reported in the sources that because of Malik bin Dinar's loud cry while listening to his sermon, the people next to him could not follow the sermon, passed out while crying, and those in his assembly fell into ecstasy in the same way. There were even those who died from ecstasy. Wazzan says that he felt plenty of sadness for all the people of Basra. It is rumored that he constantly talked about love and affection, that he is amongst a group that greatly emphasized love, that a community with this understanding had formed around him, and that he had proposed to Rabia al-Adawiyya. He says, "Love is the highest degree". However, he says that contentment (rida) is superior to that. Ibn Taymiyya says that Abdul Wahid said, referring to one of the prophets, "God is in love with me and I am in love with God" - a phrase usually attributed to Abu al-Husayn al-Nuri, and that the first Sufi lodge (dergah) was founded by one of his disciples.

Abdul Wahid is mentioned in the chain of succession of the Alewiyya and Kummaliyya Sufi orders (tariqas), has many words and legends attributed to him especially in al-Yafii's Rawd al-Rayahin, in the manaqib and in the Sufi tabaqat books. It has been claimed that he was from the Mu'tazila due to reasons such as his inclination to the view on kasb (earning) and his inability to reconcile the verse of the Quran "Allah (if He wills) misleads the servants" with Allah's omnipotence. Yet according to the sources, he also met with Amr bin Ubayd, one of the founders of Mutazila, and cut off ties with him due to his mutazilite views. He narrated hadiths from Hasan al-Basri and Ata bin Abu Rahab, and scholars such as Waqi', Ibn al-Sammak and Darani narrated from him. However, hadith critics consider him an abandoned narrator (matruk) and the hadiths he narrated as munkar.

== See also ==
- Abu Sulayman al-Darani
- List of Sufis
- Chishti Order
