= Ubayd Allah ibn Abd Allah =

Medinian scholar of the Banu Taym

- عبيد الله بن عبد الله

Personal life
- Born: Medina, Rashidun Caliphate
- Died: 700s Umayyad Caliphate
- Era: Islamic golden age
- Known for: Tabi‘in and one of the Hadith school

Religious life
- Religion: Islam

Ubayd Allah ibn Abd Allah ibn Zuhayr ibn Abd Allah ibn Jud'an al-Taymi (Arabic: عبيد الله ابن عبد الله ابن زهير عبد الله ابن جدعان التيمي, romanized: Ubayd Allāh ibn ʿAbd Allāh ibn Zuhayr ibn Abd Allāh ibn Jud'ān al-Taymī) was a Medinian hadith narrator. He was possibly the qadi of Ta'if for caliph Abd Allah ibn al-Zubayr (r. 683–692). He retold the event of the pen and paper as he heard from Ibn Abbas.

== See also ==
- Urwa ibn al-Zubayr
