= Ahmad ibn Tawoos =

Ahmad ibn Tawoos (Arabic: أحمد بن طاووس), also known as "Tawoos" or "al-Taus" (died 673), was one of the Tabi‘in, and one of the narrators of hadith.
