= Salih Ibn Ashyam Al-Adawi =

Salih Ibn Ashyam Al-Adawi (d.ca.695) was a Muslim tabi'i of Basra, in modern-day Iraq. During the reign of Umayyad caliph Abd al-Malik ibn Marwan (r.685–705) he participated in the conquest of Sijistan and Ghazna (Afghanistan), where he was killed. It is said that he was known for his gentle sermons and advice (naseeha).
