= Wuhayb ibn al-Ward =

Wuhayb ibn al-Ward al-Makki (died c. 770) was a tabi'i Islamic scholar of hadith. Born and raised in Mecca (modern-day Saudi Arabia), it is said that he spent his life in mortification and worship (ibadah), and a number of miracles are attributed to him. He taught Ibn `Uyayna and Ibn al-Mubarak, and a few ahadith are given on his authority in Sahih Muslim and by al-Tirmidhi.
