= Thawri school =

Legal school in Sunni Islam

The Thawri school (Arabic: الثورية) was a short-lived school of fiqh. Its founder was Sufyan al-Thawri, an 8th century scholar, jurist and hadith compiler.

== History ==
Sufyan al-Thawri was born in Kufa in 719, and became the main scholar of fiqh of the city's hadith school. He held similar views to that of his contemporary, Abu Hanifa, founder of the Hanafi school of fiqh, though he opposed Abu Hanifa's use of qiyas and istihsan.

After al-Thawri's move to Basra later in his life, his jurisprudential thought (usul) became more closely aligned to that of the Umayyads and of al-Awza'i.

He spent the last year of his life hiding after a dispute between him and the Abbasid Caliph Muhammad ibn Mansur al-Mahdi. The Caliph had sent a letter to al-Thawri requesting him to accept the post of judge of Kufa on the condition that he did not make any judgment or ruling in opposition to the state policy. Al-Thawri tore this letter up and threw it into the Tigris river in disgust. After his death, the Thawri school was taken up by his students, including notably Yahya al-Qattan. However, his school did not survive, but his jurisprudential thought and especially hadith transmission are highly regarded in Islam, and have influenced all the major schools, although not in the form of organized school like other madhhabs.

== Disappearance ==
The disappearance of al-Thawri's school can be attributed to two factors. The first of these is that he spent the greater part of his life in hiding due to his differences with the state. Unable to cultivate a large following because of this, no major group of students could carry on his work. The second of these reasons is that despite having created fairly extensive compilations of hadith and their interpretations, al-Thawri instructed his principal student, Ammar ibn Sayf, to destroy and burn all of his works. This was carried out by his student, but many of his ideas were recorded by students of other imams, so they have survived until today, though not in any organized form.
