= Fatima bint Al-Aswad =

7th-century Muslim thief

Fatima bint Al-Aswad (Arabic: فاطمة بنت الأسود) was a contemporary of the Islamic prophet Muhammad. She was the first Muslim to undergo the hudud penalty for theft; her hand was cut off by order of Muhammad himself.

== Early life ==
Fatima was from the Makhzum clan of the Quraysh tribe in Mecca. She was also known as Umm Amr bint Sufyan; since Sufyan was the son of Al-Aswad ibn Abd al-Asad, it appears that Al-Aswad was actually her grandfather. His brother Abu Salama was therefore her grand-uncle.

Fatima's mother was Fatima bint Abd al-Uzza ibn Abi Qays from the Amir ibn Luayy clan, making Huwaytib ibn Abd al-Uzza her maternal uncle. Fatima had two brothers, Habbar and Abd Allah, who were early converts to Islam.

In March 624 Al-Aswad ibn Abd al-Asad fought on the side of the pagans at the Battle of Badr. He was killed there by Muhammad's uncle Hamza.

Fatima became a Muslim and gave allegiance to Muhammad. It is not stated whether she did this at the Conquest of Mecca or earlier.

== The Legal Case ==
=== The Crime ===
Both the date and the nature of Fatima's crime are disputed. It was either during the Conquest of Mecca in January 630 or during the Farewell Hajj in March 632.

According to Aisha, she used to borrow items and then deny that she had them. Another tradition describes the stolen items as “jewellery”. In a third version, she went out in the night and, having met a camp of travellers, she took one of their bags. But she was caught red-handed, and the travellers seized her and tied her up.

=== The Judgment ===
In the morning, she was brought before Muhammad. He decreed that her hand should be cut off.

The Quraysh became very worried about her, and looked for an intercessor to mitigate the penalty. More than one person interceded with Muhammad for her. Fatima's relatives felt that the only person who would dare to approach Muhammad, and the only one likely to have any influence over him, was his adopted grandson, Usama ibn Zayd, who was high in his favour. The family spoke to Usama, who in his turn approached Muhammad.

Usama spoke on Fatima's behalf, but Muhammad's face changed colour, and he asked him: “Are you interceding to violate one of Allah’s laws? Usama, do not speak to me. When the hudud are violated, there is no alternative. If my own daughter had stolen, I would have cut off her hand.” Usama replied, “Messenger of Allah, seek forgiveness for me!”

Fatima then sought refuge with Umm Salama, who was one of Muhammad's wives and a member of her own clan. But Muhammad ordered his wife to release her, repeating that he would not even spare his own daughter the penalty for theft.

At dusk Muhammad stood up to preach to the people. He praised Allah, then continued: “Now to our topic. O People, the nations before you went astray and were destroyed because if a noble person committed theft, they used to spare him, but if a weak person among them committed theft, they used to inflict the prescribed punishment upon him. By Him in whose hand is my life, even if Fatima bint Muhammad committed theft, I would have her hand cut off.”

After this announcement, he ordered that the sentence be carried out. In general, he taught that: “The hand should be cut off for stealing something that is worth a quarter of a dinar or more.”

=== The Punishment ===
Her hand was cut off, “and she left with her hand dripping with blood.”

Fatima went to the Abd al-Ashhal clan, where the wife of Usayd ibn Hudayr recognised her, invited her in and cooked her a meal. When Usayd, who was chief of the clan, returned from the mosque, he asked his wife before he had even entered the house if she had heard the news about Fatima. She replied, “Yes, she is here with me.” Usayd returned to the mosque to consult Muhammad, who told him: “She has had mercy on her. May Allah have mercy on you!”

When Fatima returned to her father, he instructed her to go to live with her maternal relatives because she “resembled” them. He did not enlarge on whether this resemblance was in appearance or in behaviour. Her maternal uncle, Huwaytib ibn Abd al-Uzza, took her in.

== Later life ==
Muhammad's wife Aisha asserted that Fatima “truly repented”. When she was in need, she would visit Aisha, who used to pass on her requests to Muhammad.

Fatima was married in Muhammad's lifetime. Her kunya Umm Amr indicates that she had a son named Amr.
