= Al-Fudayl ibn Iyad =

8th-century Islamic scholar

Al-Fudayl ibn Iyad الفضيل بن عياض

Personal life
- Died: 803 CE Mecca
- Resting place: Baghdad

Religious life
- Religion: Islam

Muslim leader
- Influenced by: Abdul Wahid bin Zaid Ja'far as-Sadiq Abu Hanifa
- Influenced: Ibrahim ibn Adham

Al-Fudayl ibn 'Iyad (Arabic: الفضيل بن عياض); fully Al-Fudayl ibn 'Iyad ibn Mas'ud al-Tamimi (died 803 CE / 187 AH), also known as Abu 'Ali, was an early Arab Muslim ascetic, scholar, and prominent figure in early Islamic mysticism. Born in Khurasan, he later migrated to Mecca where he became renowned for his profound piety, strict adherence to the Sunnah, and teachings on zuhd (asceticism).

== Early life ==
Fuḍayl was born into the Arab tribe of Banu Tamim in the region of Khurasan. Historical sources differ on his exact birthplace, variously attributing it to Samarkand, Merv, Mosul, or Balkh.

Prior to his conversion, Fuḍayl led a group of bandits, or highwayman, in Syria and Khorasan, raiding caravans and robbing travelers. Even during this time, he was a Muslim, keeping his five daily salat prayers, fasting as required and forbidding his men to uncover any women found among the victims. During this time, he was deeply in love with a woman, and would often send her tokens from his stolen treasures.

One story of his banditry has a rich merchant, fearful of running into bandits, mistake Fuḍayl for an honest man and ask him to hide the majority of his wealth lest bandits find him. As the merchant continued on his way, he was robbed of his remaining wealth by Fuḍayl's men. When the merchant returned to Fuḍayl to recover the majority of his wealth, he was dismayed to find the bandits who had robbed him there surrounding the man he had trusted; however Fuḍayl indicated that he was a god-fearing man, and would not betray his trust, therefore motioning the merchant to reclaim the wealth he had left in trust with him.

Fuḍayl was climbing a wall simply watching a passing caravan; when Fuḍayl heard someone reciting the Quranic chapter of Al-Hadid, and when he heard 57:16, which reads "Has not the Time arrived for the Believers that their hearts in all humility should engage in the remembrance of Allah and of the Truth which has been revealed (to them), and that they should not become like those to whom was given Revelation aforetime, but long ages passed over them and their hearts grew hard? For many among them are rebellious transgressors", he realised that he was a hypocrite to claim both submission to God, and banditry.

With his new found piety, Fuḍayl left his criminal ways and wandered through the desert where he found a caravan camping - and overheard two men warning each other to be wary lest the bandit Fuḍayl ibn Iyad find them. Fuḍayl stepped out and introduced himself, acknowledging that he had repented and was no longer a danger.

After this, Fuḍayl tried to visit each of his known victims to repay them what he had stolen from them, and when he ran out of available goods, he visited them to beg their forgiveness. However one Jew refused to forgive him until he had been repaid, and ordered Fuḍayl to move a pile of dirt in front of his house to work off his debt. After several days of work, a hurricane blew away the pile of dirt, and Fuḍayl explained to the Jew that God had aided him. The Jew then placed a bag of dirt on his bed and asked Fuḍayl to bring it to him, and remarked upon discovering that the dirt had turned to gold that he now believed in the religion of Fuḍayl, and asked to become a Muslim.

== Later life ==
The world is like an asylum and its inmates like insane people. Insane people are always kept imprisoned.

— Fuḍayl ibn Iyad

After his conversion, Fuḍayl moved to Kufa, in modern-day Iraq, and studied under Ja'far al-Sadiq and Abdul Wahid Bin Zaid. and taught Ibrahim ibn Adham, Bishr the Barefoot and Sari al-Saqati. When Fuḍayl determined to make the Hajj pilgrimage to Mecca, he approached his wife and told her that he had to leave on the long and dangerous journey, but that he was willing to grant her a divorce if she wished to remarry in his absence. She refused, and said she would prefer to accompany him on the trip. He remained in Mecca for a long time, and studied under Abu Hanifa. He had at least one son, named Ali, and two daughters.

Fuḍayl was noted for his asocial nature, and many examples exist of this. When crowds began to gather around his Meccan home, eager for the chance to see him, he would often dissuade them, one time standing on his roof to thank them all and tell them that he prayed God would give them meaningful employment for their time. He was rather noted for his preference for solitude, at one point saying he wished he would become ill so that he did not have meet people and could avoid going out to public prayers. Another quote that survives from him is that "I am grateful to a man who does not greet me when he sees me and does not visit me when I am sick".

Fuḍayl's son suffered from a urinary tract infection, which was cured when Fuḍayl relied on prayer and faith alone.

When Fuḍayl understood that his death may be near, he told his wife to take his daughters to Mount Abu Qais, in Mecca, and tell God that Fuḍayl had cared for them all his life and now they were in God's hands.

He died during his salat prayers, early in the year 187AH, with some scholars suggesting it was the third day of Rabi' al-awwal.

Following his wishes, his widow took their two daughters to Mount Abu Qais, where they were greeted by a leader of Yemen who was travelling with his two sons, and two marriages were thus arranged.

A shrine was built in his honor in Baghdad.

== Sayings ==
"He put all evil in a house and made his key to love the world, and he put all goodness in a house And his key was to make asceticism in this world."

== See also ==
- List of Sufis
