= Abdulrazzaq Aswad =

Iraqi military leader and governor

- Born: December 20, 1918; Alfadhil, Baghdad
- Died: January 30, 2002 (aged 83); Zayona, Baghdad
- Known for: Iraqi military leader and governor

Brigadier-General Abdulrazzaq Muhammad Aswad (December 20, 1918 – January 30, 2002) was an Iraqi military leader and governor.

== Military life ==
Abdulrazzaq Aswad joined the Military School in 1938 and eventually graduated as a Second lieutenant. He rose through military rankings until he reached "Brigadier-General".

He was given retirement in 1960. After the Revolution of February 1963, Aswad was re-inaugurated as Brigadier-General in Baghdad. Later that year, he was appointed as the Governor of Hilla (South of Baghdad), and held the position until 1966 when he submitted his resignation to Abdulrahman Arif, the President of Iraq. Abdulrahman Arif was assigned the Presidency after the death of his brother, Abdulsalam Arif.

== Life as an author ==
In the late 1970s and 1980s, he wrote 3 encyclopedias:

- Palestinian Encyclopedia, 5 Volumes. Published by Arab Encyclopedia House, Beirut - Baghdad
- The Political Encyclopedia of Iraq, 5 Volumes. Published by Arab Encyclopedia House, Beirut - Baghdad
- The Encyclopedia of Iraq-Iran War, 10 Volumes. Published by Arab Encyclopedia House, Beirut - Baghdad

In the same period, he also wrote the following:

- An Intro to the study of Religions and Ideologies, 3 Volumes. Published by Arab Encyclopedia House, Beirut - Baghdad
- The Life of the Al Mustafa, published by Arab Encyclopedia House, Beirut, Baghdad
