= Al-Aswad ibn Yazid =

Hadith narrator

Al-Aswad ibn Yazid (Arabic: الأسود بن يزيد) (d. 74 AH or 75 AH) was a well-known scholar from among the taba'een and pupil of Abd-Allah ibn Mas'ud.

He was one of the narrators of hadith.

== See also ==
- Aswad (name)
