= Al-Rabi ibn Khuthaym =

Al-Rabi ibn Khuthaym al-Thawri (d.ca 682) was a pupil of Abdullah ibn Masud and a famous tabi'i ascetic of Kufa. Constantly ill with a form of palsy, in later generations he became a symbol of endurance in the face of suffering. He emphasized the importance of silence, scrupulousness in religious observance, and the fear of Hell. Many traditions in the collection of Sahih Bukhari are given on his authority.
