= Naim ibn Hammad =

Hadith compiler (died 843)

Arabic name
- Personal (Ism): Nu‘aym نعيم
- Patronymic (Nasab): Ibn Ḥammād ابن حماد
- Teknonymic (Kunya): Abū ‘Abd Allāh أبو عبد الله
- Toponymic (Nisba): al-Marwazī المروزي

Abū ‘Abd Allāh Nu‘aym bin Ḥammād al-Khuzā‘ī al-Marwazī (Arabic: أبو عبد الله نعيم بن حماد الخزاعي المروزي; d. 13 Jumada al-Awwal 228 AH / 18 February 843 CE in Samarra) was a traditionist from Marw al-Rudh who was later based in Egypt and Baghdad. He was nicknamed Farid or Faradi due to his reputation in the field of succession law (farā’iḍ).

== Life ==
Allamah Dhahabi states, "Nu’aym was a senior in knowledge, however I am not inclined to his narrations [being reliable]."

Hafiz Ibn Rajab Al Hanbali writes: "Nu’aym (rahimahullah), although some have declared him reliable, [they did this, due to them] having good thoughts regarding him on account of his firmness on Sunnah and his rigidness on refuting the innovators. They [The Muhaddithun] have said that he would [unintentionally] err [when narrating Hadiths]. When the Muhaddithun realised that he has erred in many Hadiths, they declared him weak."

His scientific work as a collector of hadith falls within the period before the drafting of the first major canonical collections . He was followed by, among others, al-Bukhari in hadith. Nu'aym ibn Hammad studied and taught first in Basra, then moved to Egypt, where he lived for forty years. In theological questions he followed the mainstream Islamic theology.

Consequently, he refused during the Mihna the createdness of the Qur'an, al-Khalq Qur'an (خلق القرآن) and other teachings that the Mu'tazilah recognized and therefore he was exiled from Egypt to Baghdad. He died in prison in Samarra in Baghdad.

== Works ==
His magnum opus is Kitab al-Fitan, a comprehensive work on the signs preceding the Day of Qiyamah. It is the earliest complete surviving Muslim apocalyptic text. The work was translated into English by Dr. David Cook as The Book of Tribulations: The Syrian Muslim Apocalyptic Tradition. Cook describes Kitab al-Fitan as the earliest complete surviving Muslim apocalyptic text and highlights its significance as a primary source for early Islamic history, particularly for its accounts of tribal conflicts, relations between the early Muslim community, the Christian population, the Byzantine wars, Umayyad and Abbasid apocalyptic and messianic traditions.

=== Translation ===
- David Cook (trans.), The Book of Tribulations: The Syrian Muslim Apocalyptic Tradition. Edinburgh: Edinburgh University Press, 2017.
