= Amir ibn Abd al-Qays =

Amir ibn Abd al-Qays (Arabic: عامر بن عبد قيس; died c. 661–680) was a tabi`i of Basra who died at Damascus, where he had become famous within the Muslim community for his austere and eloquent speeches. Numerous miracles are recorded of him; it is said that he lived in the desert where wild beasts came tamely to him. He was also known for his charity towards orphans. These and other aspects of his life are often cited by the Sufis.

During the reign of the caliph Uthman (d. 656), the text of the Quran was standardized, and he despatched a qari along with each copy of the Quran to various cities, so as to demonstrate the correct reading to the people. Amir ibn Abd al-Qays was responsible for this important order in Basrah.

A Hebrew translation of his saying, "words that leave the heart, enter the heart" has been commonly quoted in Jewish texts since Moses ibn Ezra.
