= Masruq ibn al-Ajda' =

Islamic scholar and jurist (died 682)

Masruq ibn al-Ajda

Personal life
- Died: 682
- Era: Islamic golden age
- Region: Muslim scholar
- Main interest(s): Hadith and Fiqh

Religious life
- Religion: Islam

Muslim leader
- Influenced by: Abd Allah ibn Mas'ud

Masruq ibn al-Ajda' (Arabic مَسْرُوقْ بِنْ اَلْأَجْدَع, died 682) was a well-known and respected tabi'i (from taba'een), jurist and muĥaddith (transmitter of Prophetic traditions or hadith). Chiefly a resident of Kufa (Iraq) he was among the many students of Abdullah ibn Mas'ud. Masruq would later become a popular teacher in his own right including future Islamic scholars such as Ibrahim al-Nakha'i and others as his pupils. He is said to have fought on the side of caliph Ali ibn Abi Talib (died 661) against the Kharijites in 658.

Al-Dhahabi included Masruq in his book Siyar A'lam al-Nubala among those who are to be imitated (al-muqalladûn) in character and ibadah by following Muslim generations. It is said that Masruq worshipped Allah very earnestly and that he used to sleep in sajdah (prostration) before the Kaaba. When people suggested him repose in his last illness, he answered: ‘I swear by God that if someone appeared and told me that God would not punish me at all, still I would continue to pray to Him with the same earnestness as before.’
