= Tabi'un =

Successors of the Sahaba in Islam

The tābiʿūn (Arabic: اَلتَّابِعُونَ, 'followers' or 'successors', also accusative or genitive tābiʿīn اَلتَّابِعِينَ, singular tābiʿ تَابِعٌ) are the generation of Muslims who followed the companions (ṣaḥāba) of the Islamic prophet Muhammad, and thus received their teachings secondhand. A tābiʿ knew at least one ṣaḥābī. As such, they played an important part in the development of Islamic thought and knowledge, and in the political development of the early caliphate.

The next generation of Muslims after the tabiʿūn are called the tābiʿ at-tābiʿīn تَابِعُو ٱلتَّابِعِينَ. The first three generations of Muhammad's followers make up the salaf سَلَفُ of Islam.

== Sunni definition ==
Muslims from the Sunni branch of Islam define a tābiʿ as a Muslim who:

1. Saw at least one of the companions of Muhammad
2. Was rightly-guided (ar-rāšidūn)
3. One who died in that state. The Khawarij are therefore not referred to as tābiʿūn even though they saw many of Muhammad's companions.

Sunni Muslims also regard the tābiʿūn as the best generation after the companions. According to Sunni Muslims, Muhammad said: "The best people are those living in my generation, then those coming after them, and then those coming after (the second generation)"

The tābiʿūn are divided by most Muslim scholars into three classes:

1. The students of companions who accepted Islam before the conquest of Mecca
2. The students of companions who accepted Islam after the conquest of Mecca
3. The students of companions who were not yet adults at the time of Muhammad's passing

== List of tābiʿūn ==
The first tābiʿ to die was Zayd ibn Ma'mar ibn Zayd, 30 years after the hijra, and the last to die was Khalaf ibn Khalifa, who died in 180 AH. Alternatively, since the status of Khalaf ibn Khalifa as a tābiʿ is strongly challenged by reputed scholars, the last to die from amongst them may have been Jarir bin Haazim in 170 AH. Therefore, many of the tābiʿūn were tasked with the preservation of Islamic traditions from the era of the companions to later Muslims.

- Aban ibn Uthman
- Abbad ibn Abd Allah az-Zubair
- Abd Allah ibn Muhammad ibn al-Hanafiyyah
- Abd al-Rahman al-Awza'i
- Abd al-Rahman ibn Abi Layla al-Kindi (d. 701), transmitter of traditions on Ali and the companions, joined the uprising of Ibn al-Ash'ath and killed at the Battle of Dayr al-Jamajim.
- Abu Muslim al-Khawlani
- Abu Hanifa (80 - 150 A.H.)
- Ahnaf ibn Qais
- Ali ibn Husayn Zayn al-Abidin
- Alqama ibn Qays
- Amr ibn Uthman
- Amir al-Sha'bi
- Ata ibn Abi Rabah (d. 106 A.H.)
- Hammam ibn Munabbih
- Hasan ibn Muhammad ibn al-Hanafiyyah (d. 100 A.H.)
- Hasan al-Basri (21 - 110 A.H.)
- Ibn Jurayj
- Ibn Kathir al-Makki
- Ibn Shihab al-Zuhri (d. 124 A.H.)
- Ibn Sirin
- Ja'far al-Sadiq
- Malik Dinar
- Masruq ibn al-Ajda' (d. 103 A.H.)
- Musa ibn ʿUqba
- Muhammad ibn Abi Bakr
- Muhammad al-Baqir
- Mujahid ibn Jabr
- Nafi Mawla Ibn Umar
- Qasim ibn Muhammad ibn Abi Bakr (d. 103 A.H.)
- Said ibn al-Musayyib (d. 93 A.H.)
- Sa'id ibn Jubayr
- Salim ibn Abd-Allah
- Shaikh Habib Al-Raee
- Sulaym ibn Qays
- Sulaiman al-Aʽmash
- Tawus ibn Kaysan
- Ubayd-Allah ibn Abd-Allah (d. 98 A.H.)
- Umar II
- Urwah ibn Zubayr (d. 94 A.H.)
- Uwais al-Qarani
- Wahb ibn Munabbih
- Wuhayb ibn al-Ward
- Yahya ibn Sa'd (d. 143 A.H.)
- Zayd ibn Ali (d. 740 C.E. (122 A.H. ?))
- Al-Nakhai (d.714) Al-Nakhai

== See also ==
- List of Sahaba
