= Islamic primary rulings =

First tranche of Islamic commandments

Islamic primary rulings (Persian:احکام اولیه) from the perspective of shia Islam religion. Based on the divisions that have been made by religious scholars, God's commandments are divided into two categories provisions of primary and secondary rules. The primary rulings constitute all Islamic duties and obligations deduced and inferred by jurists from the four sources consisting of the Quran, the Sunnah, consensus and reason, and are communicated to all Muslims. The primary rulings constitute the duties of all responsible (mukallaf) Muslim men and women.

These rulings are fixed and therefore they are not set forth for consultation, such as rulings pertaining to the acts of worship (like ritual prayer, fasting, pilgrimage to Mecca) and rulings pertaining to the commercial dealings, punishments (hudud), compensation (diyah, blood money or indemnity for bodily injury), and yet others relate to the process of trial, testimony and litigation, and so on.

The general definition for this category is that these rulings are those which, being based on the Quran, sunnah, ijma' and 'aql, with due consideration of the physical and spiritual nature of man and its proneness to various deviations and defects, and with a view to various things which are to its benefit and advantage, are not subject to any form of change whatsoever; although they are subject to modulation, depending on the varying states and conditions of a mukallaf (a responsible Muslim). These varying conditions of a mukallaf may be such as travelling, presence in one's home‑town, compulsion, exigency, or any other ordinary or extraordinary condition.""." Secondary rules, rules that are specific to the presentations some cases, the situation will become.

== Government Sentences ==
The governmental regulations governing community-based sentences that anticipated legal requirements and in accordance with the general interest of the Muslim community to maintain peace and good relations between the organization, regulation and cultural issues, training, taxation and so forth it is.
