= Intellectual proofs in Shia jurisprudence =

Among the Islamic schools of thought, intellect as a source for deriving jurisprudential rulings is usually mentioned by Shia Islam, the others like the Sunni school of thought suggest Comparison, Discretion, and other speculative arguments.

== Definition ==
'Aql literally is used in wisdom, maturity, knowledge, contemplation in opposition to asininity and idiotism. Technically, it is used for a faculty discovering good and evil and instigating good and avoiding evil. Man's sayings, behaviors, and judgments of things are through this reasoning that helps analyze the data received and choose the best one. Thus, the intellectual proof here is any certain intellectual ruling that leads to a Sharia ruling. Intellect can be classified according to its object into:

First: theoretical intellect that is used when intellect cognizes what is subject to knowledge and is non-relevant to practice like the impossibility of the conjunction of the opposites or two plus two is four.

Second is the practical intellect; that is when intellect cognizes what is relevant to practice like an evil being of injustice or goodness of hospitality. What we mean here, as the intellectual proof is the practical one.

== Literature review ==
The first Usūlīs have not declared intellect as a source of Sharia; for example, Sheikh Mufīd (413 A.H) considers the Quran and Sunnah as Sharia sources and regarded the intellect as one of the ways to reach to the Quran and Sunnah. Sheikh Tūsī (460 A.H) only mentions that intellect finds out the obligation of appreciating the kindness of others and that justice is good, and injustice is evil, without counting intellect as a separate source of Sharia. Maybe Sayed Sharif Murtadhā (436 A.H) was the first one to name intellect as an independent source for Sharia rulings. According to him, when there is not a ruling for an issue in the three other sources (the book, Sunnah, and consensus), the jurist has to refer to intellect, and then, the ruling of intellect will be the ruling of Allah. Ibn Idrīs Hillī (598. A.H) declares this issue later without explaining it more. Later, Muhaqqiq Hillī (676 A.H) and Shahid Awwal (786 A.H)came to explain intellect as a source. Then, recent scholars like Mīrzāye Qummī and Sahib Al-Fusūl delivered more accurate and detailed discussions concerning intellect. On the contrary, Akhbārīs do not consider intellect as a source of Sharia.

== Types of intellectual rulings/proofs ==
Intellect as an independent source for deducing Sharia rulings may be of two types:

=== 1)Independent intellectual proofs ===
It is when intellect deduces a Sharia ruling without appealing to any Sharia premise. In logic, any Syllogism is made of two premises (minor and major premises) and a conclusion. If both premises are intellectual then it is an independent intellectual proof. For example:

- Justice is rationally good.

- Whatever is good rationally is obligatory according to Sharia

*Therefore, Justice is obligatory according to Sharia

Another example:

- Injustice is rationally evil.

- Whatever is evil rationally is prohibited according to Sharia.

*Therefore, Injustice is prohibited according to Sharia.

Studying the views of Usūlīs here shows that the only Independent intellectual ruling is the issue of essential intellectual good and evil. In these arguments, the minor premise deals with the goodness or evil being of things and the major premise is the co-implication between the ruling of Sharia and that of intellect. Thus, there are two points to be explained:

==== a)Meaning of good and evil ====
Being good and evil might be interpreted in different ways:

A. what is counted as perfection and positive characteristic for man can be called good and contrary to it what is regarded imperfection is considered evil. For example, knowledge, bravery, kindness is good and ignorance, forgery, betrayal is evil. All scholars agree that intellect can specify this kind of good and evil.

B. what causes pleasure or is to the interest of man is considered by intellect to be good and what is unpleasing or is disadvantageous is taken to be evil. For example, exercising is good and drinking is evil. The scholars agree that intellect can specify this kind of good and evil as well.

C. those deeds that are befitting and admired by the intellect are considered to be good and their doers deserve rewards for doing them, like justice. On the contrary, the disagreeable, unappealing, inappropriate conducts are considered evil that their doers are to be blamed and punished such as injustice. Good and evil by this meaning are the subjects of debate here.

==== b)The meaning of essential good and evil ====
Man's conducts in regard to their being essentially good or evil are of three types:

A. Some acts are essentially good or evil so that they are fixed under any circumstances. For example, justice is always good and injustice is always evil.

B. Some of the actions are demanding and require goodness or evil in normal conditions but they can lose this character under a specific condition, like truthfulness or lying. It means that truthfulness is good by itself but on some occasions, it might be evil, like a condition that telling truth may lead to the death of someone. This type of act is called accidental good and evil.

C. Some actions are neutral in normal conditions and under specific conditions may be good or bad, like walking. Walking is not good or bad by itself. However, if one walks to go and help people, it turns good and if it is for hurting others, it becomes evil.

As it is seen, the first meaning of good and evil is the matter of discussion here and the debate revolves around answering two questions:

-regardless of Sharia statements, are there essential good and evil in man's conduct?

-assuming the existence of essential good and evil in man's conduct, is the intellect capable to discover them?

Shia, Muʿtazila, and some Ashʿarī scholars believe in the essential good and evil in man's conduct, regardless of the Shari rulings. On the other hand, the majority of Ashʿarīs believe that the deeds of man have no value other than what Sharia ascribes to them. Thus, what Sharia considers to be good is good and what it regards as evil is evil.

The first group appeals to man's conscience-based-based cognition from any religion or thought to find justice good and injustice evil. So that it is beyond the teachings of religions. Besides, without essential good and evil, even one cannot prove the truthfulness of prophets and they cannot be trusted, because if we deny essential good and evil, then it is not evil to lie, and also injustice is not evil. Therefore, the person who claims to be a prophet can lie and Allah can give miracles to liars and this injustice and misguidance are not evil. Then, how can we trust prophets and follow them?

Concerning the second question, Shia Usūlīs believe that man can discern essential good and evil through the intellect without referring to the statement of Sharia.

==== c)Co-implication between the ruling of intellect and Sharia ====
We first need to clarify the meaning of co-implication and then suggest proof for it.

1. To understand the meaning of this co-implication look at the example one more time:

- Justice is rationally good.

- Whatever is good rationally is obligatory according to Sharia

Therefore:Justice is obligatory according to Sharia

In the major premise, it has been claimed that what intellect deduces is implied by Sharia so there is an implication or co-implication between the ruling of intellect and Sharia. Thus, deduction of the Shari ruling out of intellect depends on accepting this implication.

2. The proof for the co-implication is rational as well. When intellect finds certain expediency and goodness in doing an action or when it is certain on evil being of another action and had a certain ruling for necessity of performing or abandoning that action, then the intellect will have another ruling beside it; that is to say: any rational and wise law-giver has to find this action obligatory or prohibited as well.

=== 2)Dependent intellectual proofs ===
It is when intellect deduces a Sharia ruling by appealing to some Sharia premises. So that some of the premises are Sharia and some of them are intellectual. For instance:

-Allah has commanded to perform Salāt in the Quran (Sharia)

- The command of Allah denotes obligation (intellectual rule)

Therefore: Salāt is obligatory.

Another example:

- Salāt is obligatory (Shari)

- Whatever is obligatory then its preliminaries (Muqaddamāt) are obligatory too. (Intellectual)

Therefore: The preliminaries of Salāt are obligatory according to Sharia

Concerning dependent intellectual proofs, Usūlīs discuss the following issues separately:

- The problem of preliminary of the mandatory act
- Implication of invalidity by prohibition (Iqtidhā' Al-Nahy li-lfisād)
- The problem of the opposite (Dhid)
- Conjunction of command and prohibition
- Replacement/ Sufficiency (Ijzā)

== See also ==
- Independent legal reasoning in Islamic law
- Fiqh
- Jafar jurisprudence
- Glossary of Islam
- Mizan, a comprehensive treatise on the contents of Islam written by Javed Ahmed Ghamidi.
- Sources of Islamic law
- List of Shia books
- Shia view of the Quran
