= Shia Islam =

Second-largest branch of Islam

Shia Islam (Note: /ˈʃiːə/ /ˈɪzlɑːm, ˈɪzlæm/) is the second-largest branch of Islam. It is rooted in the belief that the Islamic prophet Muhammad explicitly designated his cousin and son-in-law Ali ibn Abi Talib (r. 656–661) as his rightful political successor (caliph) and the divinely guided spiritual leader of the Muslim community (imam). Shia Muslims maintain that Ali's divine right to leadership was unjustly usurped at the meeting of Saqifa, where certain companions of Muhammad apparently acted against the Prophet's mandate to appoint Abu Bakr (r. 632–634) as caliph. While Sunni Muslims accept the rule of Abu Bakr, Umar (r. 634–644), and Uthman (r. 644–656), Shia Muslims honour what they perceive to be the Prophet's wishes, recognizing Ali alone as Muhammad's true and legitimate successor.

Shia Muslims believe the imamate continued rightfully through Ali's sons, Hasan and Husayn, after whom various Shia branches emerged to follow the lines of the true imams. Central to Shia devotion is a profound reverence for the ahl al-bayt, the purified family of Muhammad, who are recognized as the infallible inheritors of his divinely granted knowledge and spiritual authority. Sacred Shia holy sites include the shrine of Ali in Najaf, the shrine of Husayn in Karbala, and other mausoleums of the revered ahl al-bayt.

Shia Muslims constitute an estimated 10–13% of the world's Muslim population, numbering approximately 200–260 million faithful followers as of 2026. The three principal Shia branches are Twelverism, Isma'ilism, and Zaydism. Shia Muslims form a majority in Iran, Iraq, and Azerbaijan while making up almost half of the Muslim population of Lebanon and Bahrain. Substantial Shia communities also exist in Turkey, Yemen, Saudi Arabia, Afghanistan, and the South Asia. Iran remains the only country in the world where Shia Islam officially serves as the foundation of both its legal framework and system of governance.

== Etymology ==
The word Shia (or Shīʿa; /ˈʃiːə/; Arabic: شِّيْعَة) is derived from shīʿatu ʿAlī (شِّيْعَة عَلِيّ, 'followers of Ali'). An adherent is called a Shi'i (Shīʿī; Arabic: شيعيّ; pl. shīʿiyyūn; Arabic: شيعيون). In Arabic, "Shīʿa" means followers and supporters; the term derives from al-shiyāʿ and al-mushāyaʿa, which convey the meanings of following, supporting, and obedience. Shia Islam is also referred to in English as Shiism (or Shīʿism) (/ˈʃiːɪz(ə)m/), and Shia Muslims as Shiites (or Shīʿites) (/ˈʃiːaɪt/).

The term Shia was first used during Muhammad's lifetime. At present, the word refers to Muslims who believe that the leadership of the Muslim community after Muhammad belongs to ʿAlī ibn Abī Ṭālib, Muhammad's cousin and son-in-law, and his successors.

Nawbakhti states that the term Shia refers to a group of Muslims who, at the time of Muhammad and after him, regarded ʿAlī as the Imam and caliph. Al-Shahrastani explains that the term Shia refers to those who believe that ʿAlī was designated as the heir, Imam, and caliph by Muhammad, and that ʿAlī's authority is maintained through his descendants. For the adherents of Shia Islam, this conviction is implicit in the Quran and the history of Islam. Shia Muslim scholars emphasize that the notion of authority is linked to the family of the Abrahamic prophets, as the Quranic verses 3:33 and 3:34 illustrate: "Indeed, Allah chose Adam, Noah, the family of Abraham, and the family of 'Imrân above all people. They are descendants of one another. And Allah is All-Hearing, All-Knowing."

== History ==
The original Shia identity referred to the followers of Imam ʿAlī, and Shia theology was formulated after the hijra (7th century CE). The first Shia governments and societies were established by the end of the 9th century. The 10th century has been referred to by the scholar of Islamic studies Louis Massignon as "the Shiite Ismaili century in the history of Islam".

=== Origins ===
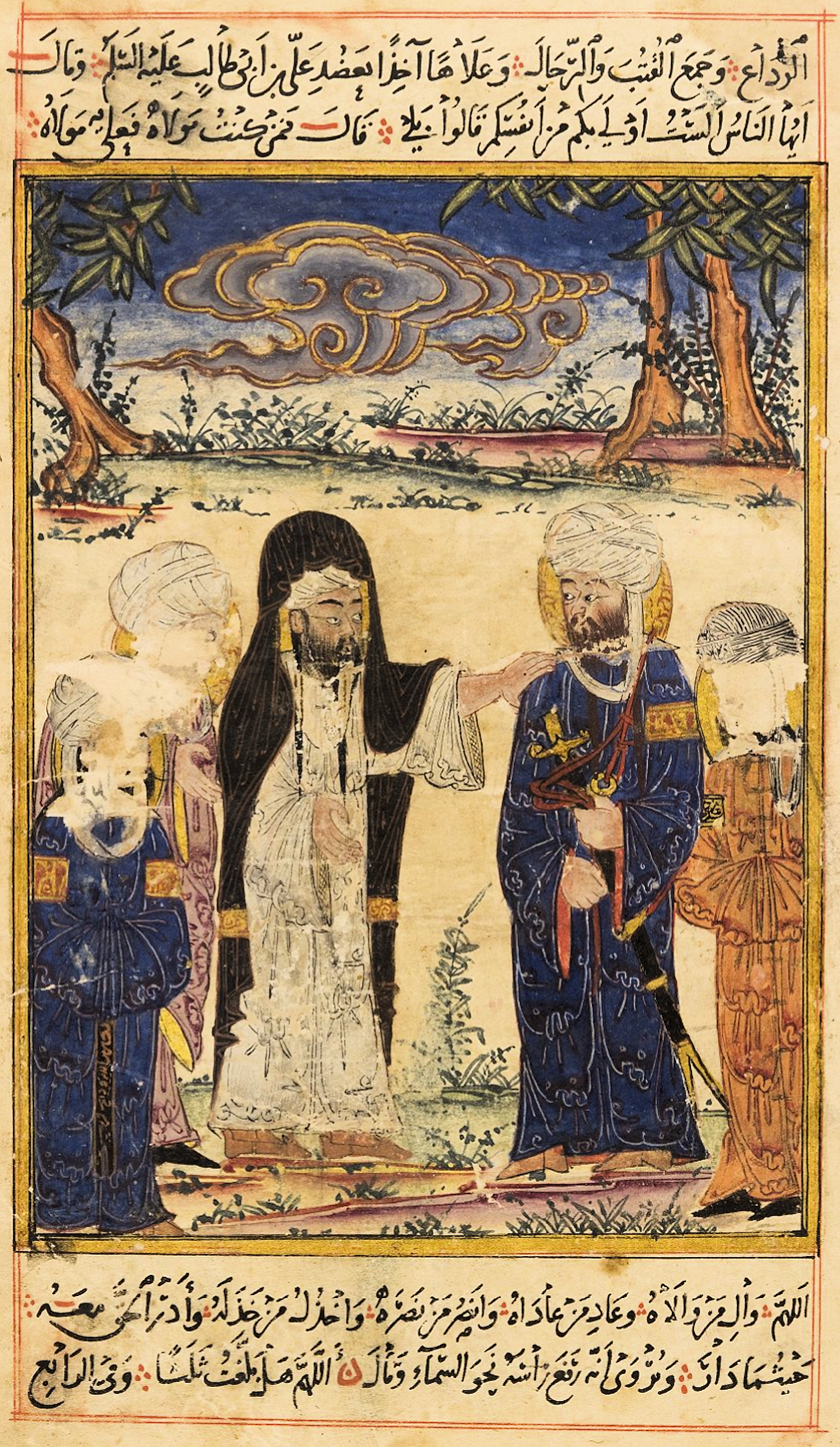
The investiture of ʿAlī ibn Abī Ṭālib at Ghadir Khumm (MS Arab 161, fol. 162r, 1308–1309, Ilkhanid manuscript illustration)

The Shia, originally known as the "partisans" of ʿAlī ibn Abī Ṭālib, Muhammad's cousin and Fatima's husband, first emerged as a distinct movement composed of those fiercely loyal to him during the First Fitna (656–661). Shia doctrine is founded on the understanding that ʿAlī was uniquely designated to lead the Muslim community after Muhammad's death in 632. While the origins of Shia Islam remain a subject of scholarly debate, many Western historians have attempted to characterize early Shia Islam merely as a political faction rather than a religious movement, while others recognize this framework as an anachronistic imposition of the Western separation of religion and politics.

Shia Muslims point to Muhammad's explicit designation of ʿAlī as his successor during a major sermon at Ghadir Khumm, in which he declared: "Anyone who has me as his mawla, has ʿAlī as his mawla". Many versions of the sermon include the invocation: "O God, befriend the friend of ʿAlī and be the enemy of his enemy". The interpretation of this prominent proclamation is central to the Sunni–Shia divide: while Sunni scholars tend to interpret it as a general affirmation of ʿAlī's merit, Shia Muslims maintain it to be a clear and unambiguous designation of ʿAlī as Muhammad's appointed successor. Shia sources further record that those present at Ghadir Khumm immediately congratulated ʿAlī, acclaiming him as Amir al-Mu'minin ("commander of the believers").

When Muhammad died in 632 CE, ʿAlī and Muhammad's closest relatives remained occupied with the solemn duty of his funeral arrangements. While they were preparing his body, Abū Bakr, ʿUmar ibn al-Khaṭṭāb, and Abu Ubaidah ibn al Jarrah convened a separate meeting with the leaders of Medina at Saqifa and secured the election of Abū Bakr as the first of the rāshidūn caliphs. While Sunni Muslims maintain that this election was politically legitimate, the process had no clear basis or precedent set by Muhammad, and ʿAlī's partisans viewed it as a direct violation of the Prophet's designation at Ghadir Khumm. Abū Bakr served from 632 to 634, followed by ʿUmar (634–644) and ʿUthmān (644–656).

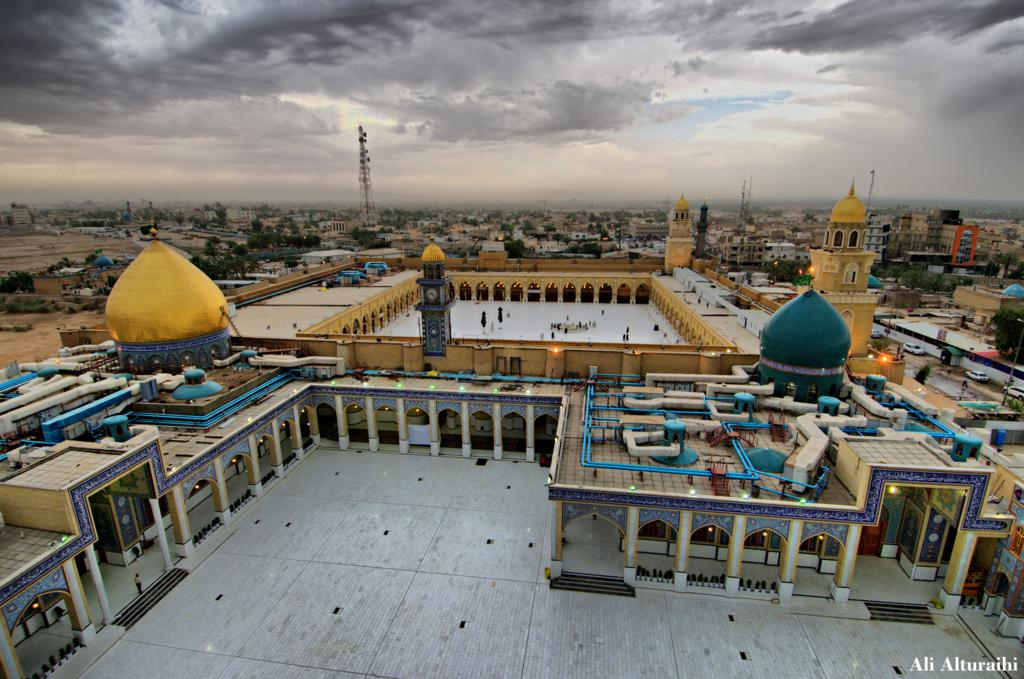
Great Mosque of Kufa, site of ʿAlī's assassination (661)

Following the assassination of ʿUthmān in 656, the Muslims of Medina finally turned to ʿAlī as the fourth caliph, and he established his capital in Kufa. ʿAlī's subsequent rule over the early Islamic empire (656–661) was marked by entrenched opposition from rival factions. The resulting conflict, known as the First Fitna, became the first major civil war within the Muslim community, encompassing a series of revolts against ʿAlī by groups that had initially affirmed the legitimacy of his caliphate before ultimately turning against him.

The conflict began with the Battle of the Camel in 656, in which ʿAlī's forces successfully prevailed against the coalition of Aisha, Ṭalḥah, and al-Zubayr. At the Battle of Siffin in 657, ʿAlī's campaign to subdue Muʿāwiyah, the governor of Damascus, was frustrated by a forced arbitration that proved structurally disadvantageous to ʿAlī. He subsequently withdrew to Kufa, where he decisively defeated the Khārijīs — former supporters who had fractured his coalition — at the Battle of Nahrawan in 658. In 661, ʿAlī was assassinated by a Khārijī while in a vulnerable state of prostration during prayer (sujud) at the Great Mosque of Kufa. Following this, Muʿāwiyah consolidated power, seized the caliphate, and founded the Umayyad dynasty.

=== Hasan, Husayn, and Karbala ===
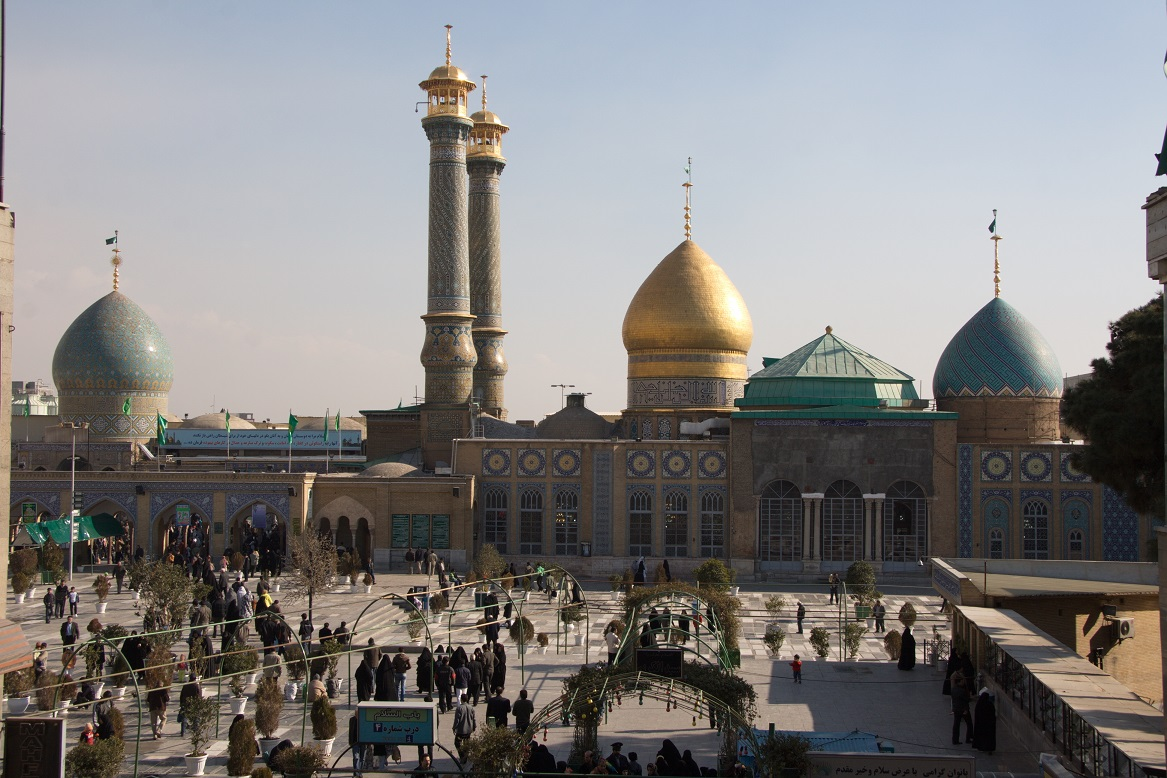
Shāh ʿAbd al-ʿAẓīm Shrine in Rey, Iran

Upon the death of ʿAlī, his elder son Ḥasan assumed leadership of the Muslims of Kufa. After a series of skirmishes between the Kufa Muslims and the army of Muawiyah, Ḥasan ibn ʿAlī agreed to cede the caliphate to Muawiyah and maintain peace among Muslims upon certain conditions: the enforced public cursing of ʿAlī, including during prayers, should be abandoned; Muawiyah should not use tax money for his own private needs; there should be peace, and followers of Ḥasan should be given security and their rights; Muawiyah would never adopt the title of Amir al-Mu'minin ("commander of the believers"); and Muawiyah would not nominate any successor. Ḥasan then retired to Medina, where in 670 CE he was poisoned by his wife Ja'da bint al-Ash'ath, after being secretly contacted by Muawiyah, who wished to pass the caliphate to his own son Yazid and viewed Ḥasan as an obstacle.

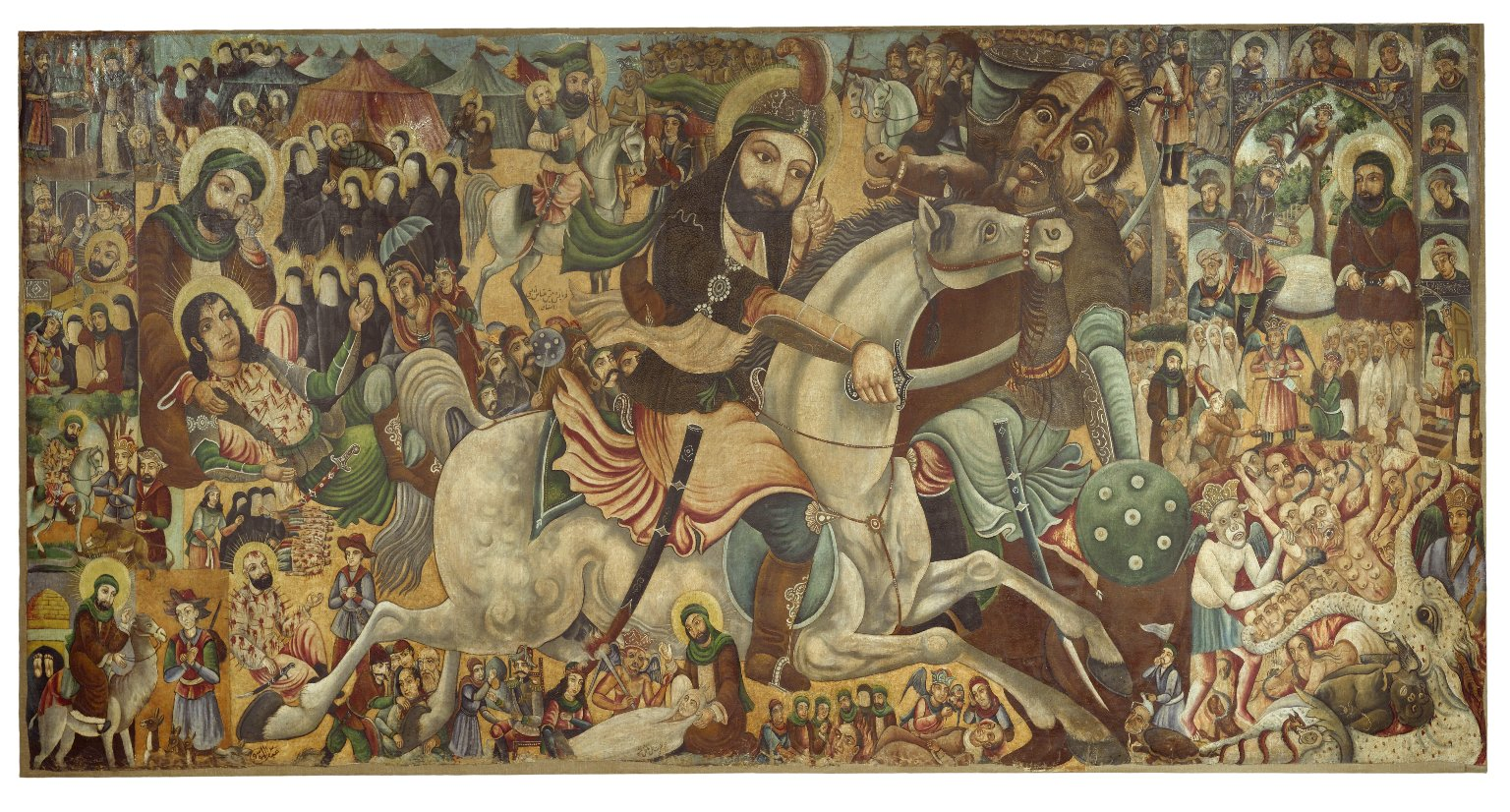
Battle of Karbala, painting by the Isfahan-based Persian artist Abbas Al-Mousavi (between 1868 and 1933)

Ḥusayn ibn ʿAlī, ʿAlī's younger son and brother to Ḥasan, initially resisted calls to lead the Muslims against Muawiyah and reclaim the caliphate. In 680, Muawiyah died and passed the caliphate to his son Yazid, thereby breaking the treaty with Ḥasan ibn ʿAlī. Yazid demanded that Husayn swear allegiance (bay'ah) to him. ʿAlī's faction, having expected the caliphate to return to ʿAlī's line upon Muawiyah's death, viewed this as a betrayal of the peace treaty, and Ḥusayn refused this demand for allegiance. There was a groundswell of support in Kufa for Ḥusayn to return there and take his position as caliph and Imam, so Ḥusayn gathered his family and followers in Medina and set off for Kufa.

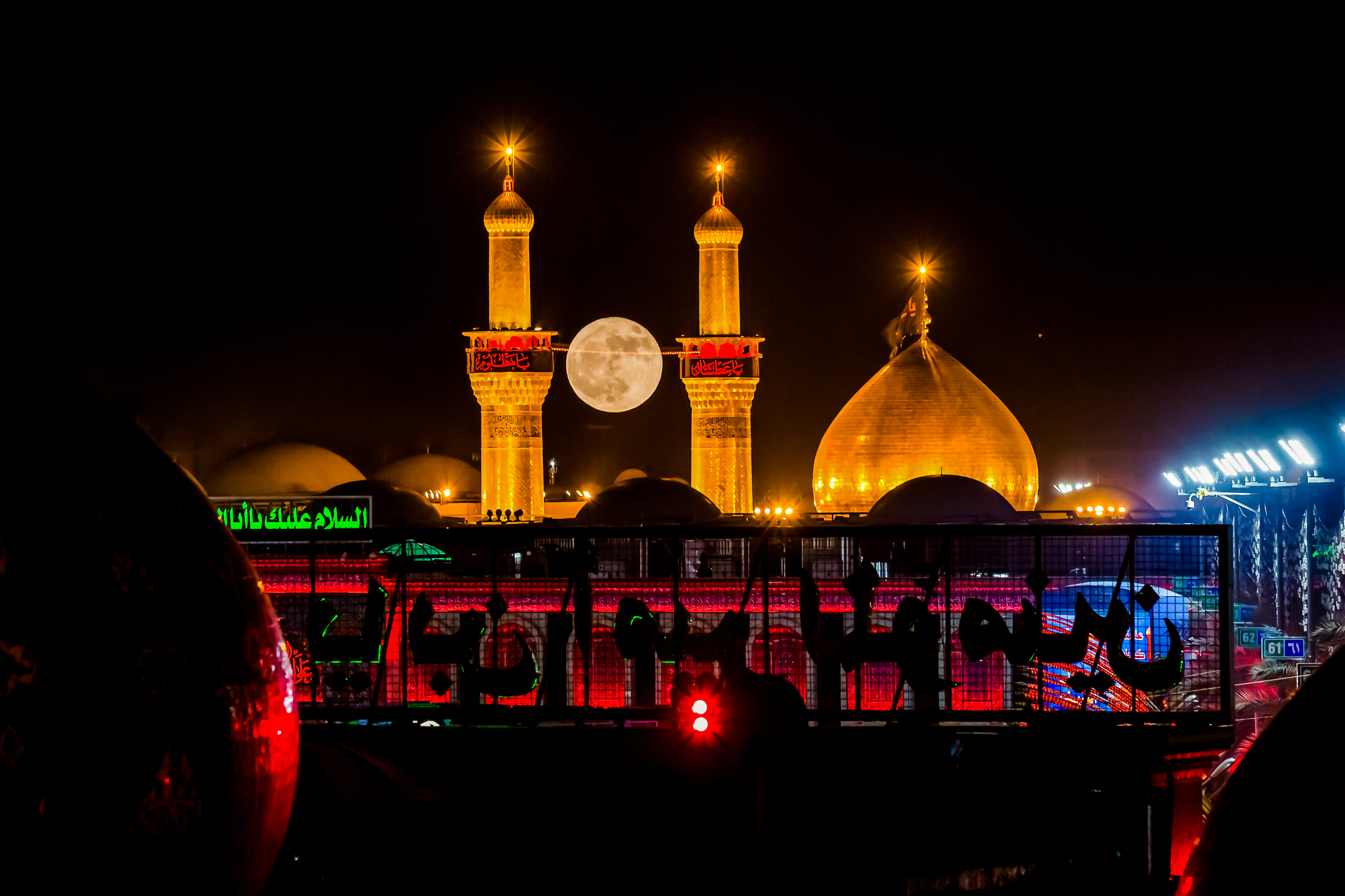
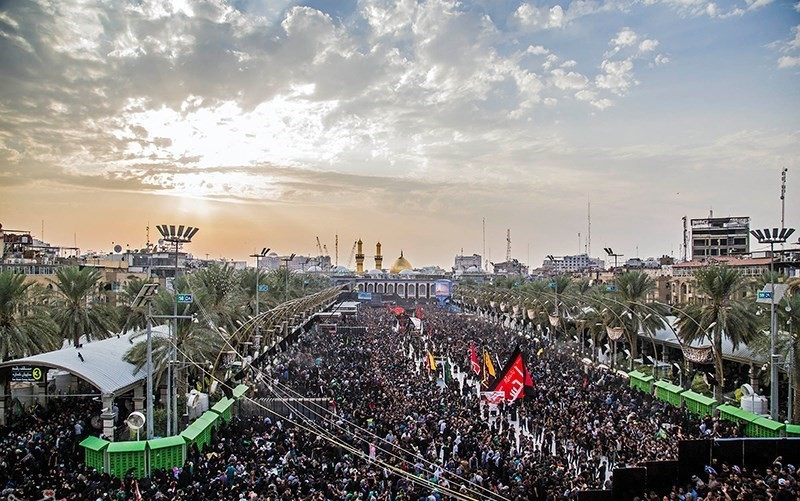
Left: the Shrine of Imam Ḥusayn; right: the shrine premises during Arba'een

En route to Kufa, Husayn was intercepted by an army of Yazid's men, which included forces from Kufa, near Karbala. Rather than surrendering, Husayn and his followers chose to stand and fight. In the Battle of Karbala, Ḥusayn and approximately 72 of his family members and followers were killed, and Husayn's head was delivered to Yazid in Damascus. The Shia community regards Ḥusayn ibn ʿAlī as a martyr (shahid) and counts him as an Imam from the Ahl al-Bayt. The Battle of Karbala and the martyrdom of Ḥusayn ibn ʿAlī are widely cited as the definitive moment of separation between the Shia and Sunnī sects of Islam. Ḥusayn is the last Imam following ʿAlī mutually recognized by all branches of Shia Islam. The martyrdom of Husayn and his followers is commemorated on the Day of Ashura, occurring on the tenth day of Muharram, the first month of the Islamic calendar.

=== Imamate of the Ahl al-Bayt ===
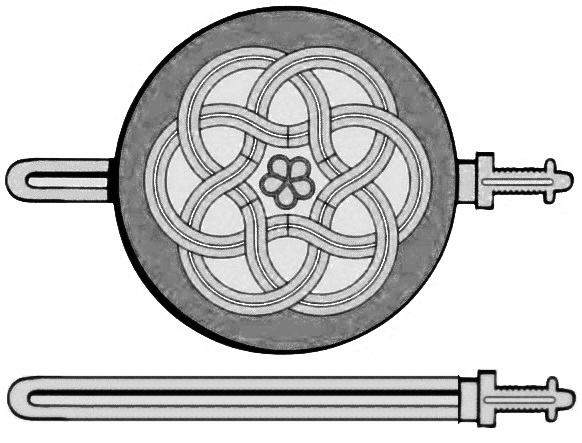
Zulfiqar with and without the shield. The Fatimid depiction of ʿAlī's sword is carved on the gates of Old Cairo, namely Bab al-Nasr (shown below). Two swords were captured from the temple of Manāt, a pre-Islamic Arabian deity, during the Raid of Sa'd ibn Zaid al-Ashhali. Muhammad gave them to ʿAlī, saying that one of them was "Zulfiqar", which became known as the sword of ʿAlī and a later symbol of Shia Islam.

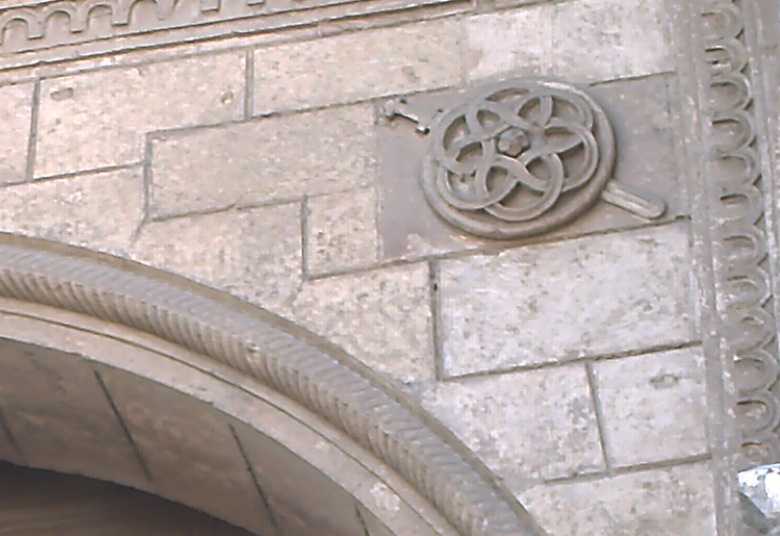
Depiction of ʿAlī's sword and shield carved on the Bab al-Nasr gate wall in Islamic Cairo, Egypt

Later, most denominations of Shia Islam, including Twelvers and Ismāʿīlīs, became Imamis. Shia Muslims believe that Imams are the spiritual and political successors to Muhammad. Imams are human individuals who not only rule over the Muslim community with justice but are also able to keep and interpret the divine law and its esoteric meaning. The words and deeds of Muhammad and the Imams serve as a guide and model for the community to follow; as a result, they must be free from error and sin, and must be chosen by divine decree (nass) through Muhammad. According to this view, which is distinctive to Shia Islam, there is always an Imam of the Age, who is the divinely appointed authority on all matters of faith and law in the Muslim community. ʿAlī was the first Imam of this line, the rightful successor to Muhammad, followed by male descendants of Muhammad through his daughter Fatimah.

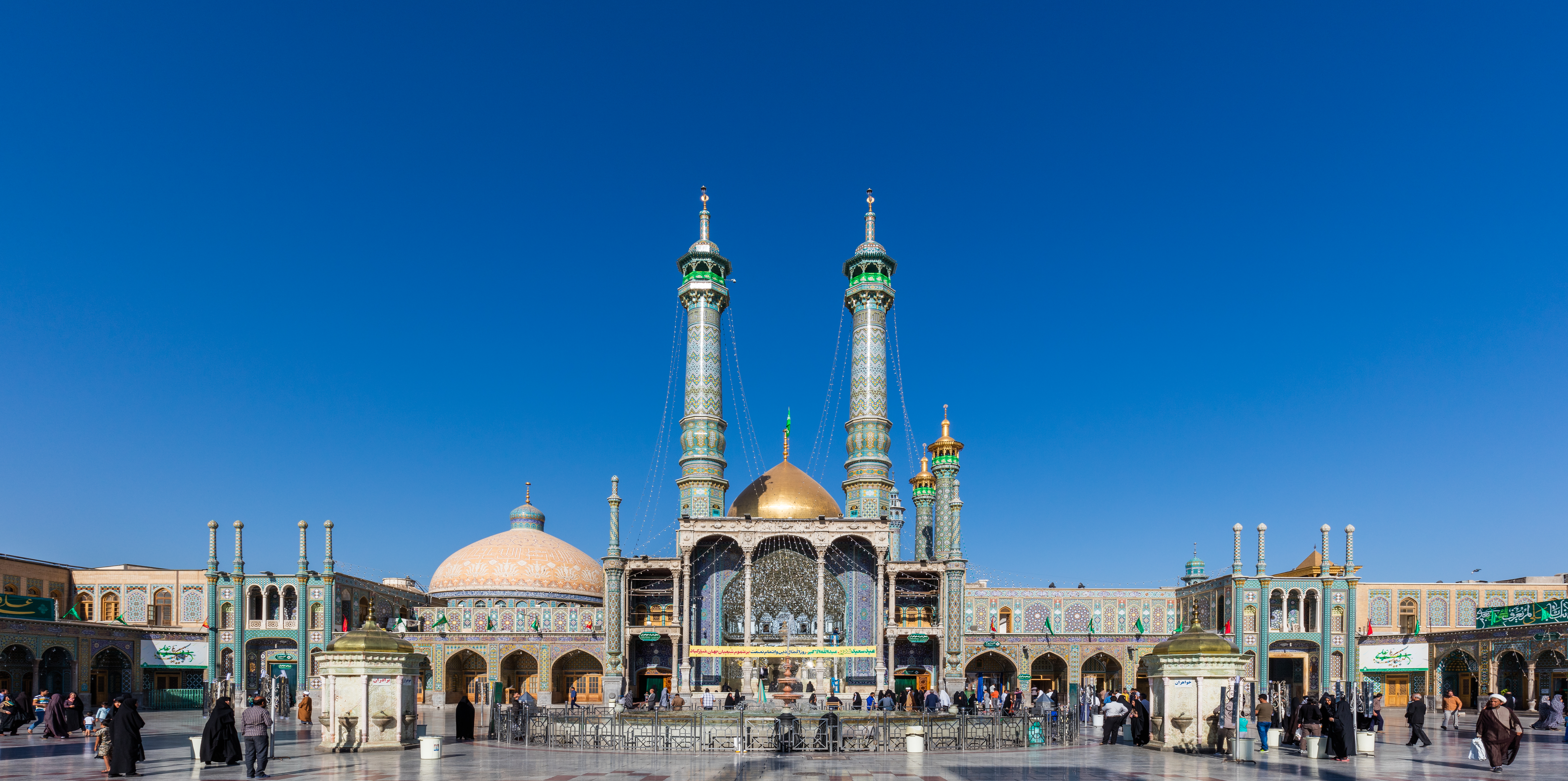
Fatima Masumeh Shrine in Qom, Iran

This difference between following the Ahl al-Bayt (Muhammad's family and descendants) or pledging allegiance to Abū Bakr has shaped the Shia–Sunnī divide on the interpretation of some Quranic verses, hadith literature (accounts of the sayings and living habits attributed to the Islamic prophet Muhammad during his lifetime), and other areas of Islamic belief throughout the history of Islam. For instance, the hadith collections venerated by Shia Muslims are centred on narrations by members of the Ahl al-Bayt and their supporters, while some hadith transmitted by narrators not belonging to or supporting the Ahl al-Bayt are excluded.

Those of Abu Hurairah, for example — Ibn Asakir in his Taʿrikh Kabir and Muttaqi in his Kanzuʿl-Umma report that ʿUmar ibn al-Khaṭṭāb lashed him, rebuked him, and forbade him from narrating ḥadīth from Muhammad. ʿUmar is reported to have said: "Because you narrate hadith in large numbers from the Holy Prophet, you are fit only for attributing lies to him. So you must stop narrating hadith from the Prophet; otherwise, I will send you to the land of Dus." (An Arab clan in Yemen, to which Abu Hurairah belonged.)

According to Sunnī Muslims, ʿAlī was the fourth successor to Abū Bakr, while Shia Muslims maintain that ʿAlī was the first divinely sanctioned "Imam", or successor of Muhammad. The seminal event in Shia history is the martyrdom at the Battle of Karbala of ʿAlī's son, Ḥusayn ibn ʿAlī, and 71 of his followers in 680, who led a non-allegiance movement against the defiant caliph.

It is believed in the Twelver and Ismāʿīlī branches of Shia Islam that divine wisdom (ʿaql) was the source of the souls of the prophets and Imams, which bestowed upon them esoteric knowledge (ḥikmah), and that their sufferings were a means of divine grace to their devotees. Although the Imam was not the recipient of a divine revelation (waḥy), he maintained a close relationship with God, through which God guided him, and the Imam in turn guided the people. Imamate, or belief in the divine guide, is a fundamental belief in the Twelver and Ismāʿīlī branches of Shia Islam, and is based on the concept that God would not leave humanity without access to divine guidance.

=== Imam Mahdi, last Imam of the Shia ===
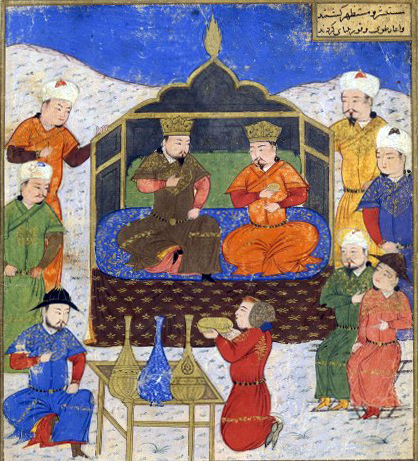
Ghazan and his brother Öljaitü were both tolerant of sectarian differences within the boundaries of Islam, in contrast to the traditions of Genghis Khan.

In Shia Islam, Imam Mahdi is regarded as the prophesied eschatological redeemer of Islam who will rule for seven, nine, or nineteen years (according to differing interpretations) before the Day of Judgment and will rid the world of evil. According to Islamic tradition, the Mahdi's tenure will coincide with the Second Coming of Jesus (ʿĪsā), who is to assist the Mahdi against the Masih ad-Dajjal (literally, the "false Messiah" or Antichrist). Jesus, who is considered the Masih ("Messiah") in Islam, will descend at the point of a white arcade east of Damascus, dressed in yellow robes with his head anointed. He will then join the Mahdi in his war against the Dajjal, where it is believed the Mahdi will slay the Dajjal and unite humankind.

=== Dynasties ===
In the century following the Battle of Karbala (680 CE), as various Shia-affiliated groups diffused throughout the emerging Islamic world, several nations arose based on Shia leadership or population.

- Idrisids (788–985): a Zaydi dynasty in what is now Morocco.
- Qarmatians (899–1077): an Ismaili Iranian dynasty. Their headquarters were in Eastern Arabia and Bahrain. It was founded by Abu Sa'id al-Jannabi.
- Buyids (934–1055): a Twelver Iranian dynasty that at its peak consisted of large portions of Iran and Iraq.
- Uqaylids (990–1096): a Shia Arab dynasty with several lines that ruled in various parts of al-Jazira, northern Syria, and Iraq.
- Ilkhanate (1256–1335): a Persianate Mongol khanate established in Iran in the 13th century, considered a part of the Mongol Empire. The Ilkhanate initially embraced many religions, but was particularly sympathetic to Buddhism and Christianity. Later Ilkhanate rulers, beginning with Ghazan in 1295, chose Islam as the state religion; his brother Öljaitü promoted Shia Islam.
- Bahmanids (1347–1527): a Shia Muslim state of the Deccan Plateau in Southern India, and one of the great medieval Indian kingdoms. The Bahmanid Sultanate was the first independent Islamic kingdom in Southern India.

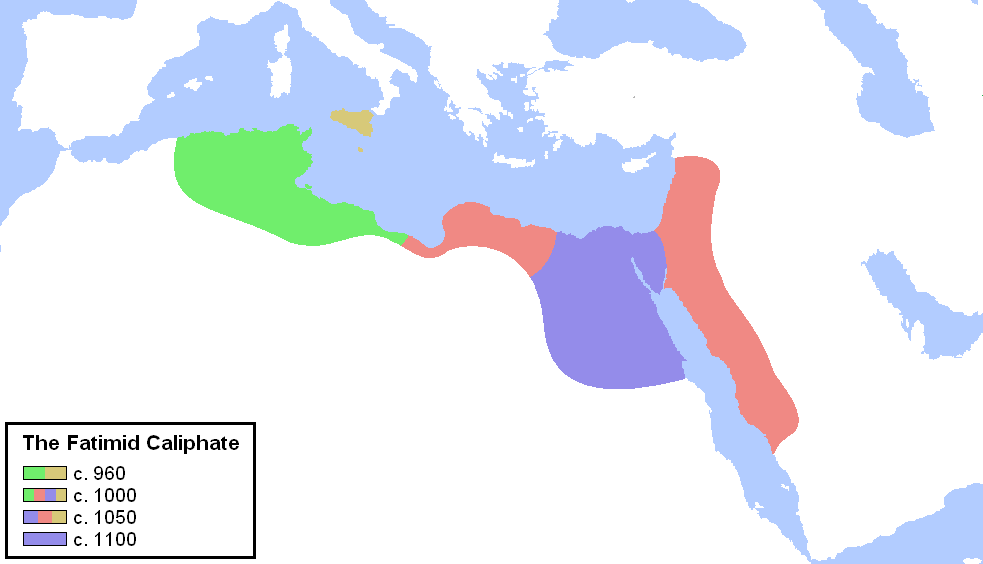
The Fatimid Caliphate at its peak, c. 1100

==== Fatimid Caliphate ====
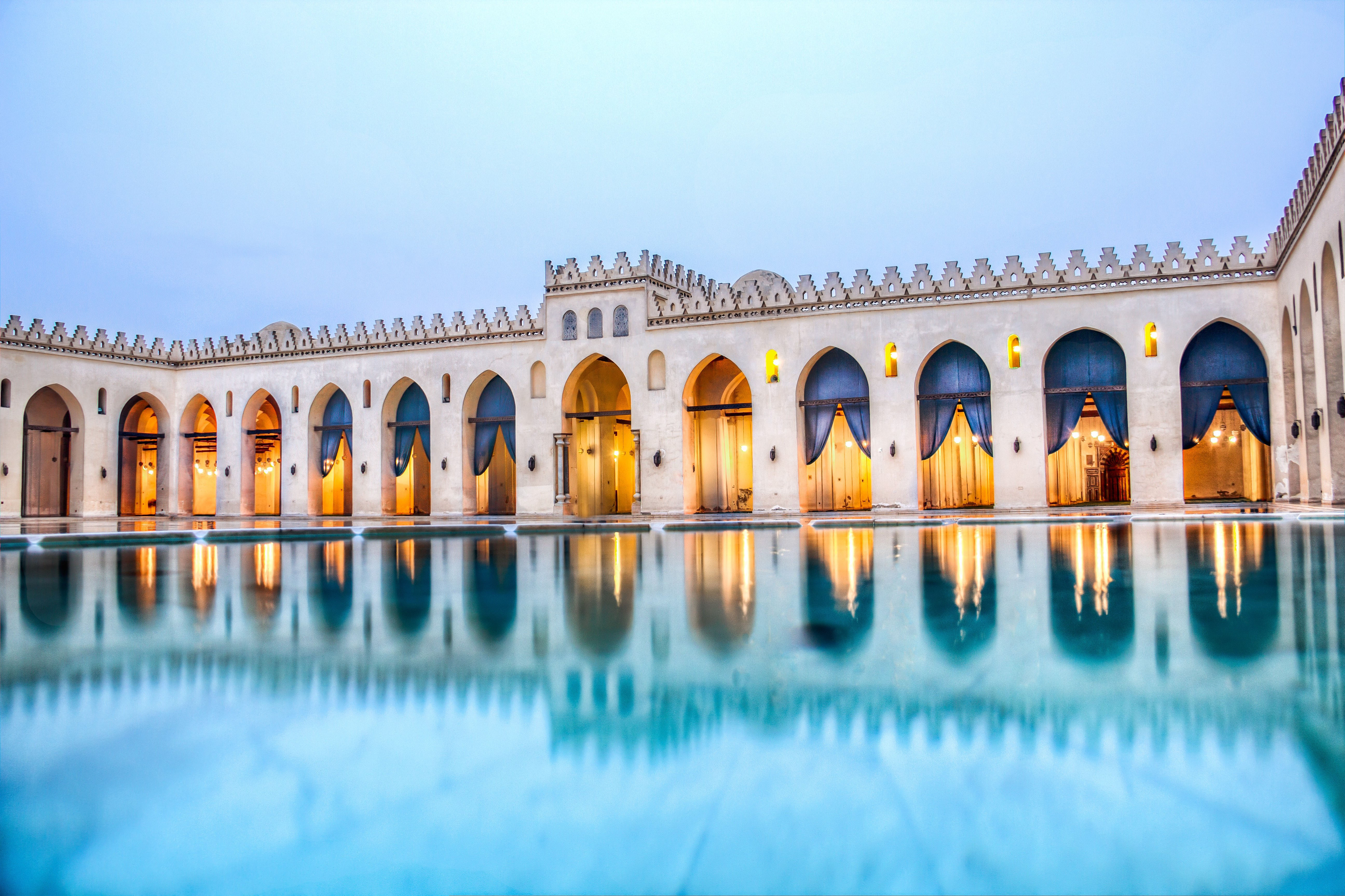
Al-Hakim Mosque, named after al-Ḥākim bi-Amr Allāh (985–1021), the 6th Fatimid caliph and 16th Ismāʿīlī Imam, in Islamic Cairo, Egypt.

- Fatimids (909–1171): Controlled much of North Africa, the Levant, parts of Arabia, and the holy cities of Mecca and Medina. The dynasty takes its name from Fāṭimah, Muhammad's daughter, from whom they claim descent.
  - In 909, the Shia military leader Abu Abdallah al-Shiʻi overthrew the Sunni rulers in North Africa, an event which led to the foundation of the Fatimid Caliphate.
  - Al-Qaid Jawhar ibn Abdallah (Arabic: جوهر; fl. 966–d. 992) was a Shia Fatimid general. Under the command of Caliph al-Muʻizz, he led the conquest of North Africa and then of Egypt, founded the city of Cairo and the al-Azhar Mosque. A Greek slave by origin, he was freed by al-Muʻizz.

==== Safavid Empire ====
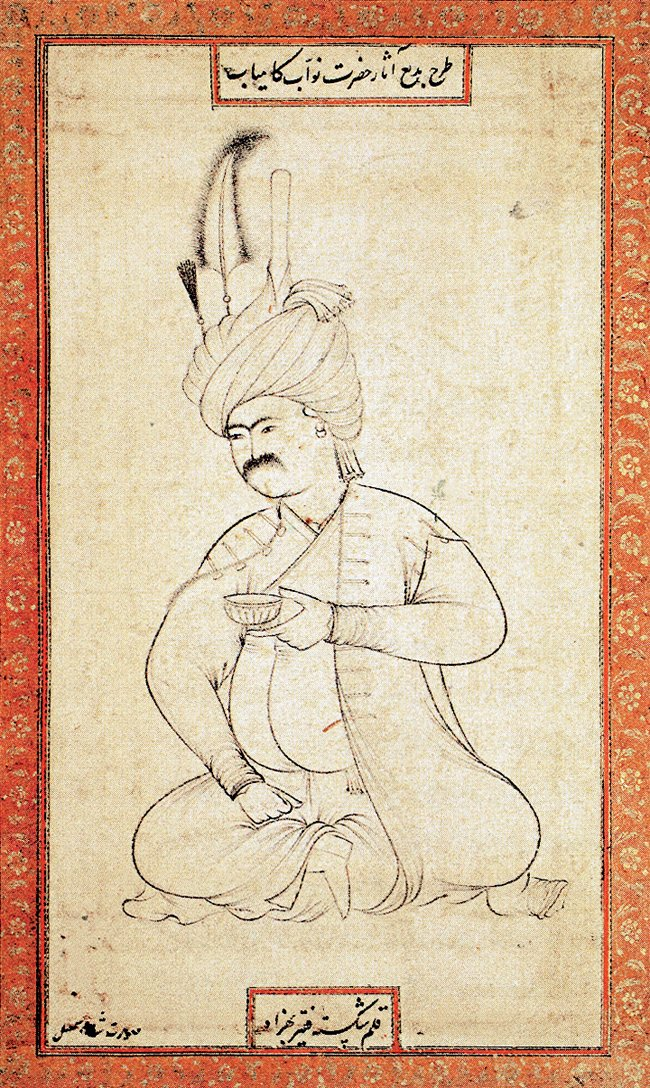
One of the first actions performed by Ismā'īl I of the Safavid Empire was the proclamation of the Twelver denomination of Shia Islam as the official religion of Iran, causing sectarian tensions in the Middle East when he destroyed the tombs of the Abbasid caliphs, the Sunnī Imam Abū Ḥanīfa al-Nuʿmān, and the Ṣūfī Muslim ascetic ʿAbdul Qādir Gīlānī in 1508. In 1533 the Ottoman Turks, upon their conquest of Iraq, rebuilt various important Sunnī shrines.

A major turning point in the history of Shia Islam was the dominion of the Safavid dynasty (1501–1736) in Persia. This caused a number of significant changes in the Muslim world:

- The ending of the relative mutual tolerance between Sunnis and Shias that had existed from the time of the Mongol conquests onwards and the resurgence of antagonism between the two groups.
- Initial dependence of Shia clerics on the state, followed by the emergence of an independent body of ulama capable of taking political stands different from official policies.
- The growth in importance of Persian centres of Islamic education and religious learning, which resulted in the transformation of Twelver Shia Islam from a predominantly Arab phenomenon to a predominantly Persian one.
- The growth of the Akhbari school of thought, which taught that only the Quran, ḥadīth literature, and sunnah are to serve as bases for verdicts, rejecting the use of reasoning.

With the fall of the Safavids, the state in Iran — including the state system of courts with government-appointed judges (qāḍī) — became much weaker. This gave the sharīʿa courts of mujtahid an opportunity to fill the legal vacuum and enabled the ulama to assert their judicial authority. The Usuli school of thought also increased in strength at this time.

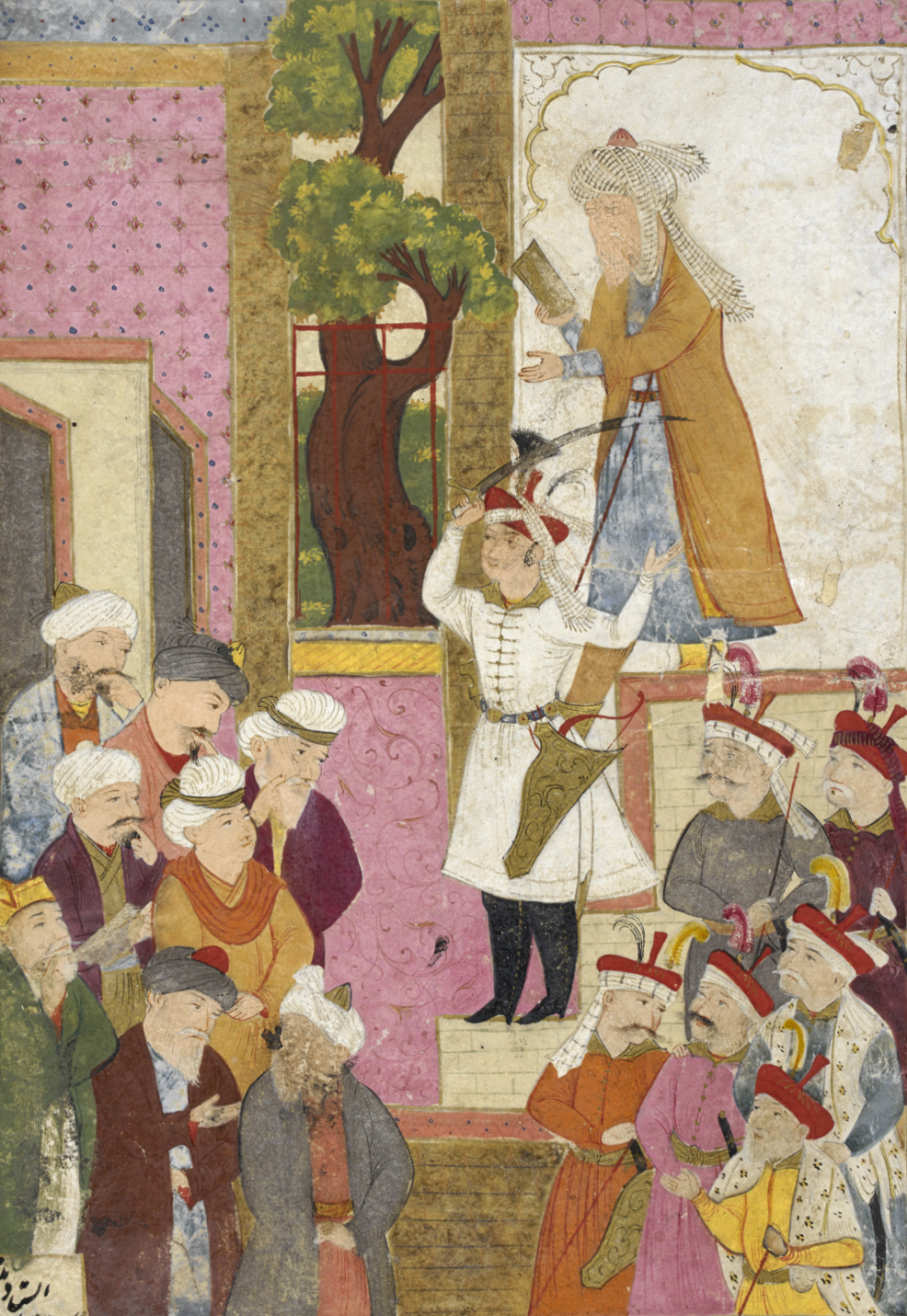
The declaration of Twelver Shīʿīsm as the state religion of Safavids

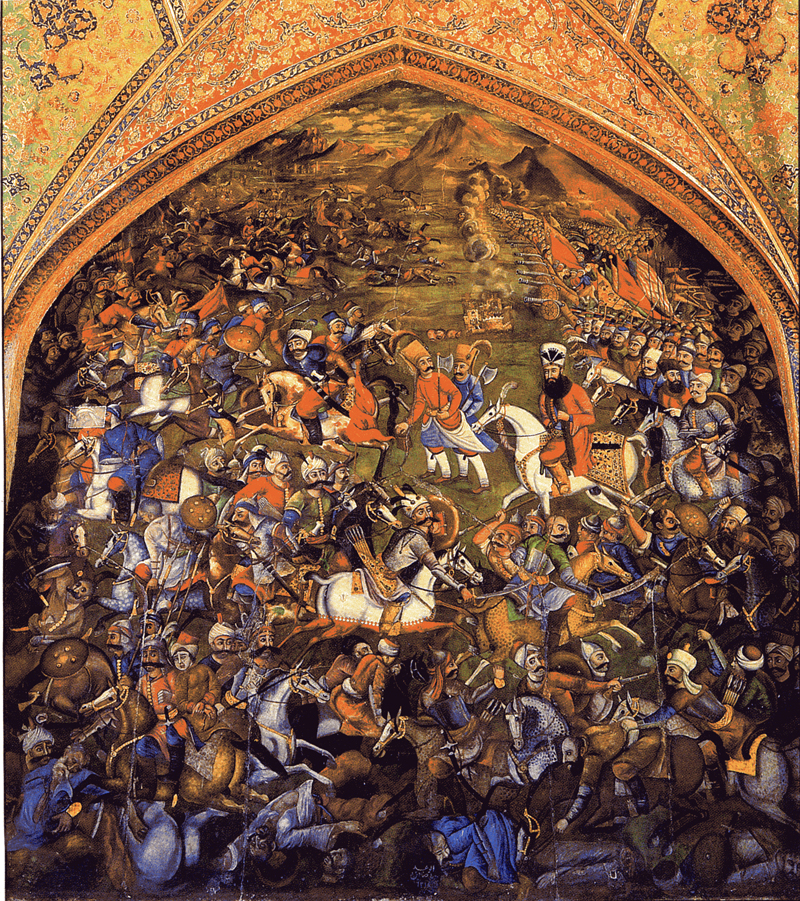
The Battle of Chaldiran in 1514 was a major sectarian crisis between Muslims in the Middle East.

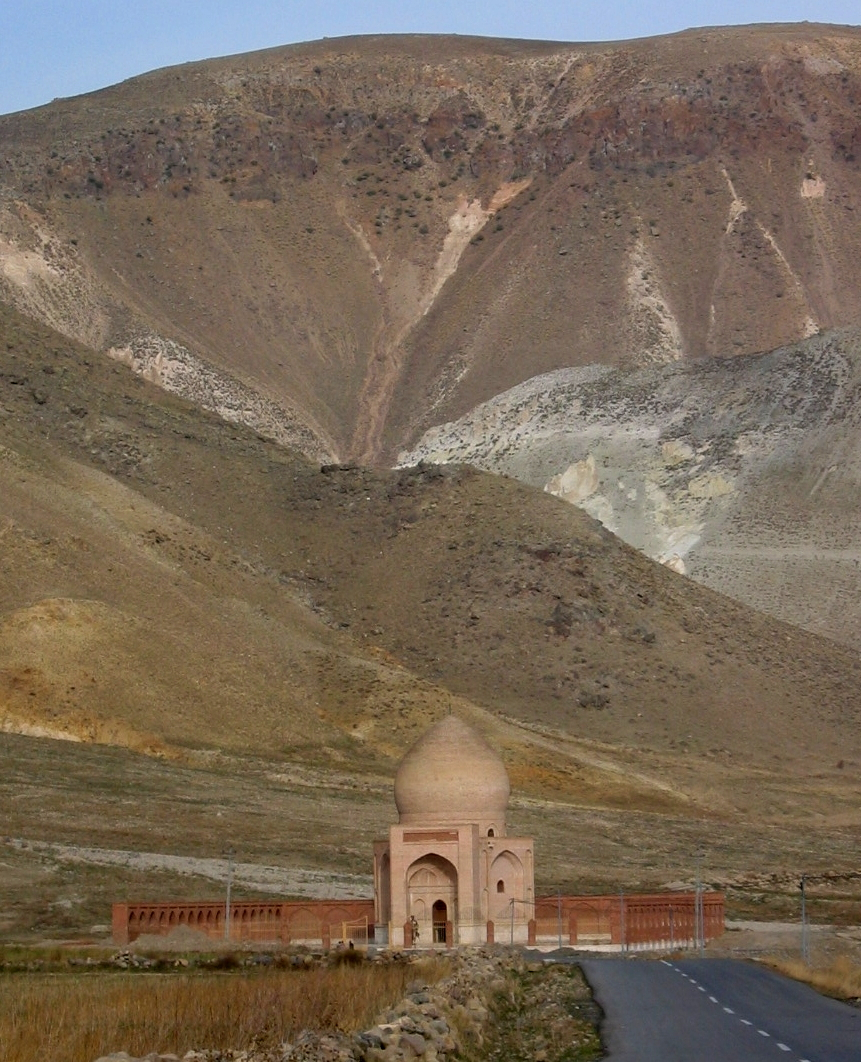
A monument commemorating the Battle of Chaldiran, where more than 7,000 Muslims of the Shia and Sunnī sects killed each other

== Beliefs ==
Shia Islam encompasses various denominations and subgroups, all bound by the belief that the leader of the Muslim community (Ummah) should hail from the Ahl al-Bayt, the family of the Islamic prophet Muhammad. It embodies a completely independent system of religious interpretation and political authority in the Muslim world.

=== ʿAlī: Muhammad's rightful successor ===
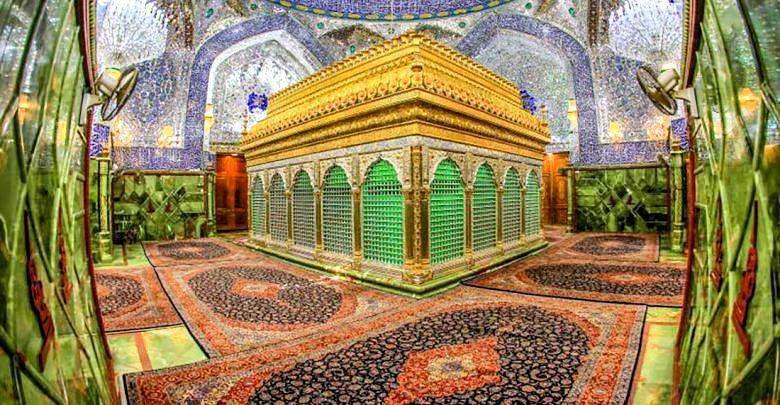
Ḍarīẖ over ʿAlī's qabr (grave), Sanctuary of Imām ʿAlī in Najaf, Iraq, one of the holiest sites in Shia Islam.

Shia Muslims believe that just as a prophet is appointed by God alone, only God has the prerogative to appoint the successor to his prophet. They believe God chose ʿAlī ibn Abī Ṭālib to be Muhammad's successor and the first caliph (Arabic: خليفة, romanized: khalifa) of Islam. Shia Muslims believe that Muhammad designated ʿAlī as his successor by God's command on several occasions, most notably at Eid Al Ghadir. Additionally, ʿAlī was Muhammad's first cousin, his closest living male relative, and his son-in-law, having married Muhammad's daughter, Fāṭimah.

=== Profession of faith (Shahada) ===
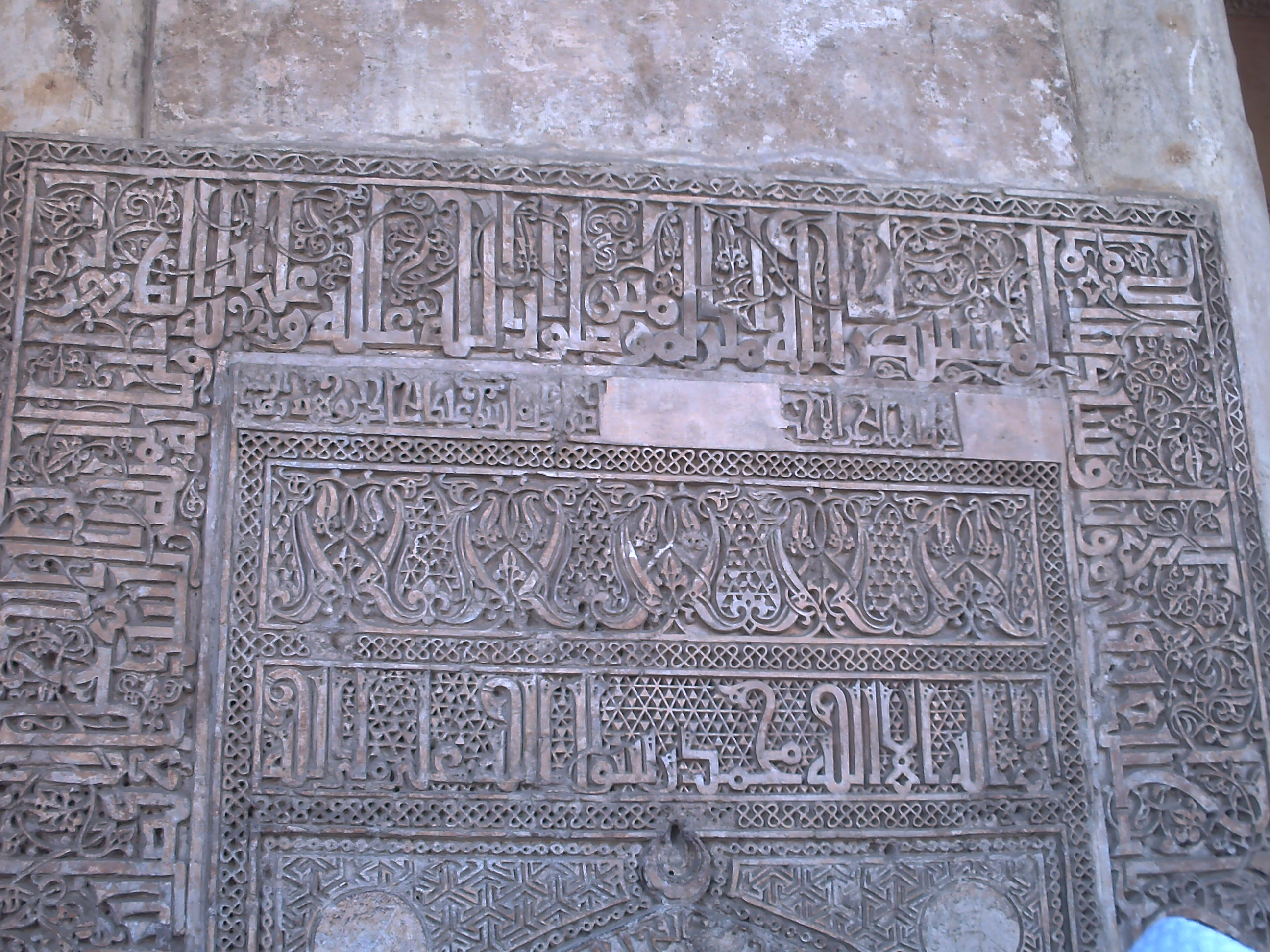
Kalema at Qibla of the Mosque of Ibn Tulun in Cairo, Egypt, displaying the phrase Ali-un-Waliullah (علي ولي الله: "ʿAlī is the Wali (custodian) of God").

The Shia version of the Shahada (Arabic: الشهادة), the Islamic profession of faith, differs from that of the Sunnīs. The Sunnī version states La ilaha illallah, Muhammadun rasulullah (Arabic: لَا إِلٰهَ إِلَّا ٱللَّٰهُ مُحَمَّدٌ رَسُولُ ٱللَّٰهِ, lit. 'There is no god except God, Muhammad is the messenger of God'); Shia Muslims add the phrase Ali-un-Waliullah (Arabic: عَلِيٌّ وَلِيُّ ٱللَّٰهِ, lit. 'Ali is the friend of God'). The basis for the Shia belief in ʿAlī ibn Abī Ṭālib as the Wali of God is derived from the Qur'anic verse 5:55.

This additional phrase embodies the Shia emphasis on the inheritance of authority through Muhammad's family and lineage. The three clauses of the Shia version of the Shahada thus address the fundamental Islamic beliefs of Tawḥīd (Arabic: توحيد, lit. 'oneness of God'), Nubuwwah (Arabic: نبوة, lit. 'prophethood'), and Imamah (Arabic: إمامة, lit. 'Imamate or leadership').

=== Infallibility (Ismah) ===
Ismah (Arabic: عصمة, romanized: 'Iṣmah or 'Isma, lit. 'protection') is the concept of infallibility or "divinely bestowed freedom from error and sin" in Islam. Muslims believe that Muhammad, along with the other prophets and messengers, possessed ismah. Twelver and Ismāʿīlī Shia Muslims also attribute the quality to Imams as well as to Fāṭimah, daughter of Muhammad, in contrast to the Zaydī Shias, who do not attribute ismah to the Imams. Though initially beginning as a political movement, infallibility and sinlessness of the Imams later evolved as a distinct belief of (non-Zaydī) Shia Islam.

According to Shia Muslim theologians, infallibility is considered a rational and necessary precondition for spiritual and religious guidance. They argue that since God has commanded absolute obedience from these figures, they must only command that which is right. The state of infallibility is based on the Shia interpretation of the verse of purification. This does not mean that supernatural powers prevent them from committing a sin, but rather that due to their absolute belief in God, they refrain from doing anything that is sinful. According to this belief, the Imams also possess complete knowledge of God's will, encompassing the totality of all times, and are believed to act without fault in religious matters. ʿAlī is regarded as a "perfect man" (Arabic: الإنسان الكامل, romanized: al-insan al-kamil) similar to Muhammad, not only ruling over the Muslim community in justice but interpreting the Islamic faith and its esoteric meaning.

=== Divine justice (ʿAdl) ===
Divine justice (ʿadl) occupies a position in Twelver theology that has no direct equivalent in mainstream Sunni thought — it is one of the five uṣūl al-dīn (foundations of religion) in Twelver doctrine, elevated to the status of a foundational creed alongside monotheism, prophethood, imamate, and resurrection. Its centrality reflects a fundamental divergence between Shia and Sunni theology on the question of God's relationship to moral categories, human agency, and the intelligibility of divine action.

==== The Ashari position and the Shia rejection ====
The dominant theological school of mainstream Sunni Islam, the Ashariyya, holds that God's will is the ultimate source of all moral categories — that an act is good because God commands it and evil because God forbids it, rather than God commanding it because it is intrinsically good. On this view, moral categories are posterior to divine will and have no independent existence that could constrain or evaluate God's actions. The Ashari position on predestination follows from this framework: all human acts, including sins, are created by Allah and "acquired" (kasb) by humans through a mechanism that Ashari theologians acknowledged was philosophically difficult to render fully coherent, but which they regarded as established by revelation. The Athari school, foundational to Wahhabism and Salafism, tends toward a harder determinism in which divine decree encompasses all things without qualification.

Twelver theology, shaped by the rational theological tradition of the Imams and particularly by the teachings of Imam Jaʿfar al-Ṣādiq, rejects both of these positions. In Shia theological epistemology, the human intellect (ʿaql) is capable of independently recognising moral categories — that justice is genuinely good and injustice genuinely evil — and God, whose essential nature is good, acts in accordance with these categories rather than arbitrarily defining them by fiat. Divine justice in Shia theology therefore means that God does not and cannot act unjustly, not because an external standard constrains Him but because injustice is incompatible with His essential nature. This position aligns Shia theology more closely with the Muʿtazilite school than with Ashari Sunni theology on this specific question, though Shia scholars are careful to distinguish their position from Muʿtazilism, grounding it in the teachings of the Imams rather than in rationalist philosophy alone.

==== Amr Bayn al-Amrayn: between determinism and free will ====
The Shia position on human agency and divine decree is encapsulated in the doctrine of Amr bayn al-Amrayn (amr bayna al-amrayn: a matter between two matters), traced in the classical sources to Imam Jaʿfar al-Ṣādiq. When asked about the relationship between divine decree and human free will, the Imam is reported to have replied that the truth lies neither in pure compulsion (jabr) nor in pure delegation of independent power to humans (tafwīḍ), but in something between the two — a position that affirms genuine human agency and moral responsibility while maintaining that this agency operates within and depends upon the sustaining will of Allah rather than independently of it.

This doctrine directly addresses what Shia scholars regard as the central incoherence of the Ashari kasb position: if Allah creates all acts including sins, then punishing humans for those acts is unjust, and divine justice becomes logically impossible to maintain. The amr bayn al-amrayn doctrine resolves this by affirming that human choices are genuinely the human's own — not compelled by divine decree in a way that would remove moral responsibility — while simultaneously maintaining that humans do not possess independent power that operates outside of Allah's sustaining will.

==== The theological and jurisprudential implications of ʿAdl ====
The elevation of divine justice to the status of a foundational creed has significant implications throughout Shia theology and jurisprudence. The intellect's capacity to recognise justice and injustice independently means that rational argument is a legitimate and necessary tool of theological inquiry — a position that gives Shia theology a more explicitly rationalist character than Athari Sunni theology, which is suspicious of subjecting divine matters to rational evaluation. This rationalist orientation is reflected in the central role of the intellect (ʿaql) as one of the four sources of Jaʿfari jurisprudence alongside the Quran, the Sunnah, and the consensus of Shia scholars.

The doctrine of divine justice also provides the theological grounding for the Shia concept of the Imamate as a divine obligation: if Allah is just, He would not leave humanity without a divinely guided and infallible leader after the Prophet's death, since doing so would expose humanity to misguidance for which they could not be held fully responsible. The necessity of the Imam is therefore not merely a political convenience but a logical consequence of divine justice. This argument — known in Shia kalām as the qāʿida al-luṭf (the principle of grace or divine facilitation) — holds that divine justice requires Allah to provide whatever is necessary for humanity to achieve the purpose for which they were created, and that an infallible divinely guided Imam is a necessary component of this provision.

=== The Shia doctrine of prophethood (Nubuwwah) ===
The Twelver Shia understanding of prophethood (nubuwwah) differs from the mainstream Sunni position in several foundational respects, producing a portrait of Muhammad that is theologically distinct from the one that emerges from the Sunni hadith corpus.

==== Pre-eternal prophethood and prophetic preparation ====
In Twelver theology, Muhammad's prophethood was not conferred upon him at the age of forty in the cave of Ḥirāʾ but was a pre-eternal reality established before the creation of the physical world. This doctrine is grounded in narrations attributed to the Imams preserved in al-Kāfī and other Shia hadith collections, in which Muhammad is reported to have said: "I was a prophet while Adam was still between water and clay." In Twelver theology, the event at the cave of Ḥirāʾ was therefore not a moment at which prophethood was bestowed upon Muhammad but rather the moment at which he received the divine command to declare publicly what was always already true — that he was the messenger of Allah and the seal of the prophets.

This theological position has significant implications for how Shia scholars evaluate specific narrations in the Sunni hadith corpus concerning the first revelation. The account recorded in Sahih al-Bukhari (Hadith 3) — transmitted through Aisha — describes Muhammad returning from the cave frightened, saying to Khadīja: "I fear for myself," and being taken to her cousin Waraqah ibn Nawfal, a Christian scholar, whose identification of the experience as revelation provided Muhammad with his initial validation. Shia scholars reject this account on theological grounds: a prophet divinely prepared for his mission from before birth cannot genuinely fear for his sanity, cannot be uncertain about the nature of his own revelation, and cannot require a Christian scholar's confirmation of an Islamic prophetic mission. The reliance on Waraqah ibn Nawfal is particularly problematic from the Shia perspective, since it implies that the Prophet's certainty about his prophethood was dependent on external human validation rather than direct divine assurance — a position Shia scholars argue contradicts both prophetic ismah and the Quranic description of divine communication (53:3).

==== The full ismah of the Prophet ====
Closely related to the doctrine of pre-eternal prophethood is the Twelver position on prophetic ismah (infallibility or divine protection from error and sin). While mainstream Sunni theology holds that prophets are protected from major sins and from errors in conveying revelation but may commit minor lapses or errors of personal judgment subsequently corrected by further revelation, Twelver theology holds that the prophets are fully infallible in all matters — actions, statements, and personal conduct — on the grounds that the prophet is the ḥujja (proof) of Allah on earth and that any error in his conduct would undermine the Quranic injunction to follow his example absolutely (33:21).

This divergence produces concrete disagreements over specific narrations in the Sunni canonical collections. Shia scholars reject as incompatible with prophetic ismah the narrations in Sahih al-Bukhari describing the Prophet contemplating suicide during the interruption of revelation (fatra al-wahy), the hadith al-sihr (Bukhari 3268) which records that the Prophet was effectively bewitched by a Jewish man named Labid ibn al-Asam such that he would imagine he had done things he had not done, and narrations suggesting the Prophet forgot portions of the Quran during recitation. From the Shia perspective these narrations are not merely historically dubious but theologically impossible: a prophet under divine protection cannot contemplate suicide, cannot be effectively bewitched in ways that compromise the reliability of his statements and actions, and cannot forget a text whose preservation Allah directly guaranteed (75:17).

Shia scholars further argue that the portrait of the Prophet that emerges from the Sunni canonical collections — uncertain at the moment of revelation, distressed during its interruption, susceptible to bewitchment — reflects the political conditions of the Umayyad and Abbasid periods in which humanising the Prophet served the function of making fallible caliphal authority seem less inadequate by comparison, rather than representing an authentic biographical record of a figure whose ismah the Shia tradition regards as theologically necessary.

==== Nūr Muḥammad: the primordial light ====
Central to Twelver Shia theology is the doctrine of Nūr Muḥammad (the Light of Muhammad), which holds that before the creation of the physical world, Allah created a primordial divine light (nūr) from which Muhammad and the Imams of his household were formed. This doctrine, rooted in narrations found in al-Kāfī and Bihar al-Anwar, establishes that Muhammad and the Imams share in a pre-eternal spiritual reality that transcends ordinary human existence — Allah created the light of Muhammad before the creation of the heavens and the earth, and from this primordial light the entire created order subsequently emerged.

The Nūr Muḥammad doctrine establishes the theological foundation for the continuity between prophethood and imamate in Shia thought: Muhammad and the Imams are not separate or successive figures but participants in a single pre-eternal divine reality whose outer (ẓāhir) dimension is the prophetic mission of legislation and revelation, and whose inner (bāṭin) dimension continues through the line of Imams after the Prophet's death. The question of who succeeded Muhammad was therefore not a political question about competence or seniority but a cosmological question about which individual shared in the nūr and possessed the divinely bestowed knowledge and authority necessary to guide the community.

==== The continuity of divine guidance: prophethood and imamate ====
A foundational principle of Twelver theology is that Allah does not leave humanity without access to a divinely guided ḥujja (proof or guide) at any point in history. This principle, articulated in narrations attributed to Imam Jaʿfar al-Ṣādiq in al-Kāfī — "were there to remain on the earth but two men, one of them would be the proof of God" — establishes the theological necessity of the Imamate as a continuation of the same divine project of guidance that prophethood represented.

In this framework, the death of Muhammad did not end divine guidance but transformed its mode: legislation (tashrīʿ) concluded with the Prophet as the seal of the prophets, but the function of interpreting, applying, and esoterically illuminating that legislation continued through the line of Imams. The Imams are therefore not replacements for the Prophet nor independent sources of new divine law, but the authoritative custodians of his complete legacy, possessing both the exoteric knowledge of the sharīʿa and the esoteric knowledge of its deeper dimensions. From the Sunni perspective the succession was a political question the community could legitimately resolve through consultation. From the Shia perspective it was a theological question — who possessed the divinely bestowed nūr, knowledge, and ismah necessary to serve as the ongoing ḥujja of Allah — that only Allah could answer and that Muhammad had already answered at Ghadir Khumm.

=== Shia hadith epistemology ===
The Shia approach to hadith methodology differs from the Sunni approach in several foundational respects that follow directly from the theological positions outlined above. These differences concern not only which hadith are accepted and rejected but the underlying epistemological framework that determines what constitutes a reliable transmission of prophetic knowledge.

==== The rejection of ʿAdālat al-Ṣaḥāba ====
The most fundamental divergence between Shia and Sunni hadith methodology concerns the doctrine of ʿAdālat al-Ṣaḥāba — the collective presumption of uprightness applied to all companions of the Prophet in Sunni hadith criticism, by virtue of which a narrator's status as a companion is in itself sufficient to establish the reliability of their transmissions. Shia hadith methodology explicitly rejects this collective presumption and evaluates each companion individually on the basis of their known conduct and loyalty to the Ahl al-Bayt. Companions who remained steadfast in their support for ʿAlī — such as Salman al-Farisi, Abu Dharr al-Ghifari, Miqdad ibn Aswad, and Ammar ibn Yasir — are accorded high reliability; companions who opposed or abandoned ʿAlī are subject to critical evaluation regardless of their general proximity to the Prophet.

The Shia theological basis for this rejection follows from the sacred history narrative: if the companions collectively failed to uphold the Prophet's designation at Ghadir Khumm, their collective presumption of virtue cannot be maintained. Shia hadith critics further argue that the doctrine is logically circular — the reliability of the companions is established by the Sunni tradition, but which companions count as reliable was itself determined by a tradition shaped by the very political events whose legitimacy is in dispute.

==== The four books and the Shia hadith canon ====
The canonical foundation of Shia hadith literature consists of four major collections compiled in the 10th and 11th centuries CE, collectively known as the Kutub al-Arbaʿa (the Four Books): al-Kāfī by Muḥammad ibn Yaʿqūb al-Kulaynī (d. 329 AH), considered the most authoritative and containing hadith attributed to the Prophet and all twelve Imams; Man lā Yaḥḍuruhu al-Faqīh by Shaykh al-Ṣadūq (d. 381 AH); and Tahdhīb al-Aḥkām and al-Istibṣār, both by Shaykh al-Ṭūsī (d. 460 AH).

A critical distinction between the Shia and Sunni hadith canons is that Shia collections include hadith attributed to the twelve Imams alongside those attributed to the Prophet, on the theological basis that the Imams' statements constitute authoritative religious knowledge transmitted through the line of divinely guided successors. This effectively extends the hadith authority period from the Prophet's death in 632 CE to the beginning of the Major Occultation of the twelfth Imam in 874 CE, grounding Shia jurisprudence in a body of traditions that Sunni methodology does not recognise as authoritative.

==== The four sources of Jaʿfari jurisprudence: the role of ʿaql ====
The Jaʿfari school of jurisprudence recognises four sources of religious law: the Quran, the Sunnah (comprising both the Prophet's traditions and those of the twelve Imams), the consensus of Shia scholars (ijmāʿ), and the intellect (ʿaql). The inclusion of the intellect as an independent source of religious law is theologically grounded in the doctrine of divine justice — since the human intellect is capable of independently recognising moral categories, its conclusions in matters where revelation is silent or ambiguous carry genuine legal weight.

The practical significance of ʿaql as a jurisprudential source is considerable: it gives Shia jurisprudence a degree of rational flexibility that allows it to engage with novel legal questions through reasoned argument rather than exclusively through textual precedent. This rationalist orientation also underlies the Shia institution of the marjaʿ al-taqlīd (source of emulation), the senior jurist whose qualified legal reasoning (ijtihad) ordinary believers are expected to follow in matters of religious practice — an institution that has no precise equivalent in Sunni jurisprudence, where the dominant Ashari and Athari theological frameworks are more suspicious of subjecting divine matters to rational evaluation.

=== Occultation (Ghaybah) ===
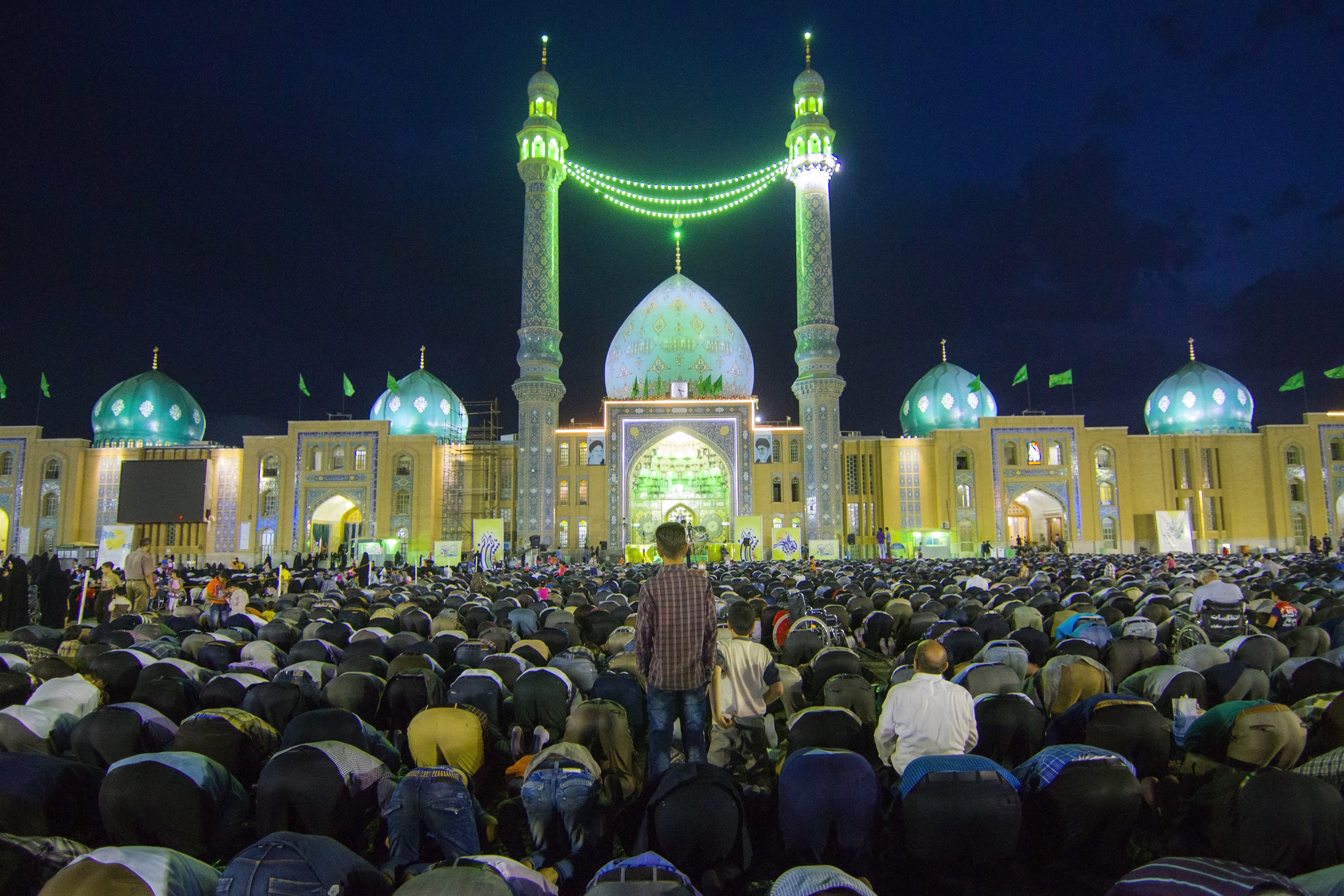
Jamkaran Mosque in Qom, Iran, is a popular pilgrimage site for Shia Muslims. Local belief holds that the 12th Shia Imam once appeared and offered prayers at Jamkaran.

The Occultation is an eschatological belief held in various denominations of Shia Islam concerning a messianic figure, the hidden and last Imam known as "the Mahdi", who will one day return to fill the world with justice. According to the doctrine of Twelver Shia Islam, the main goal of Imam Mahdi will be to establish an Islamic state and to apply Islamic laws that were revealed to Muhammad.

Some Shia subsects, such as Zaydism and Nizari Isma'ilism, do not believe in the idea of Occultation. The groups that believe in it differ as to which lineage of the Imamate is valid and therefore which individual has gone into Occultation. Twelver Shia Muslims believe that the prophesied Mahdi and 12th Shia Imam, Hujjat Allah al-Mahdi, is already on Earth in Occultation and will return at the end of time. Ṭayyibi Ismāʿīlīs and Bohra communities believe the same but for their 21st Imam, At-Tayyib Abi l-Qasim, and believe that a Da'i al-Mutlaq ("Unrestricted Missionary") maintains contact with him. Sunnī Muslims believe that the future Mahdi has not yet arrived on Earth.

=== Holy Relics (Tabarruk) ===
Shia Muslims believe that the armaments and sacred items of all of the Abrahamic prophets, including Muhammad, were handed down in succession to the Imams of the Ahl al-Bayt. Jaʿfar al-Ṣādiq, the 6th Shia Imam, in Kitab al-Kafi mentions that "with me are the arms of the Messenger of Allah. It is not disputable." Al-Ṣādiq also narrated that the passing down of armaments is synonymous with receiving the Imamat (leadership), similar to how the Ark of the Covenant in the house of the Israelites signaled prophethood. Imam Ali al-Ridha narrates that wherever the armaments among us would go, knowledge would also follow and the armaments would never depart from those with knowledge.

=== Other doctrines ===
==== Doctrine about necessity of acquiring knowledge ====
According to Muhammad Rida al-Muzaffar, God gives humans the faculty of reason and argument. Also, God orders humans to think carefully about creation, while he refers to all creations as his signs of power and glory. These signs encompass all of the universe. Furthermore, there is an analogy of humans as the little world and the universe as the large world. God does not accept the faith of those who follow him without thinking and only with imitation, but God also blames them for such actions. In other words, humans have to think about the universe with reason and intellect, a faculty bestowed on us by God. Since there is more insistence on the faculty of intellect among Shia Muslims, even evaluating the claims of someone who claims prophecy is based on the intellect.

== Practices ==
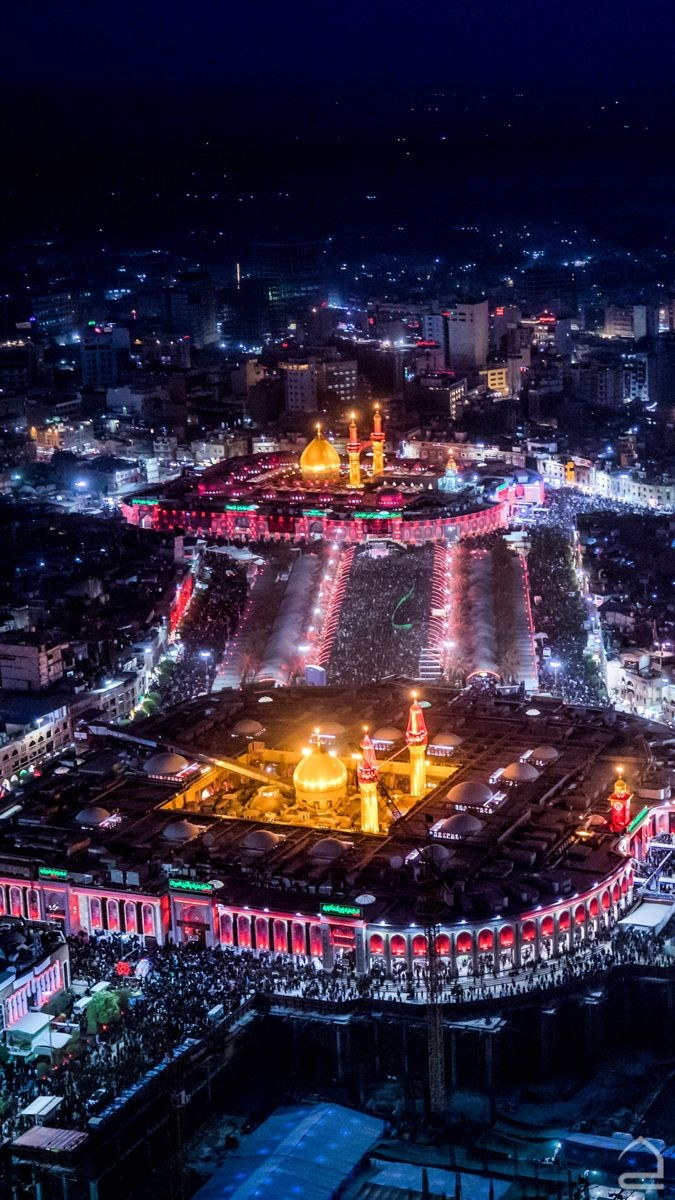
Shrine of Imam Ḥusayn in Karbala, Iraq

Shia religious practices, such as prayers, differ only slightly from the Sunnīs. While all Muslims pray five times daily, Shia Muslims have the option of combining Dhuhr with Asr and Maghrib with Isha', as there are three distinct times mentioned in the Quran. The Sunnīs tend to combine only under certain circumstances.

=== Holidays ===
Shia Muslims celebrate the following annual holidays:

- Eid al-Fitr, which marks the end of fasting during the month of Ramadan
- Eid al-Adha, which marks the end of the Hajj or pilgrimage to Mecca
- Eid al-Ghadeer, which is the anniversary of the Ghadir Khum, the occasion when Muhammad announced ʿAlī's Imamate before a multitude of Muslims. Eid al-Ghadeer is held on the 18th of Dhu al-Hijjah.
- The Mourning of Muharram and the Day of Ashura for Shia Muslims commemorate the martyrdom of Ḥusayn ibn ʿAlī, brother of Ḥasan and grandson of Muhammad, who was killed by the army of Yazid ibn Muawiyah in Karbala (central Iraq). Ashura is a day of deep mourning which occurs on the 10th of Muharram.
- Arba'in commemorates the suffering of the women and children of Ḥusayn ibn ʿAlī's household. After Ḥusayn was killed, they were marched over the desert, from Karbala (central Iraq) to Damascus (Syria). Many children (some of whom were direct descendants of Muhammad) died of thirst and exposure along the route. Arbaein occurs on the 20th of Safar, 40 days after Ashura.
- Mawlid, Muhammad's birth date. Unlike Sunnī Muslims, who celebrate the 12th of Rabi I as Muhammad's day of birth or death (because they assert that his birth and death both occur in this week), Shia Muslims celebrate Muhammad's birthday on the 17th of the month, which coincides with the birth date of Jaʿfar al-Ṣādiq, the 6th Shia Imam.
- Fāṭima's birthday on 20th of Jumada II. This day is also considered as the "'women and mothers' day"
- ʿAlī's birthday on 13th of Rajab.
- Mid-Sha'ban is the birth date of the 12th and final Twelver imam, Muhammad al-Mahdi. It is celebrated by Shia Muslims on the 15th of Sha'ban.
- Laylat al-Qadr, anniversary of the night of the revelation of the Quran.
- Eid al-Mubahila celebrates a meeting between the Ahl al-Bayt (household of Muhammad) and a Christian deputation from Najran. Al-Mubahila is held on the 24th of Dhu al-Hijjah.

=== Holy sites ===
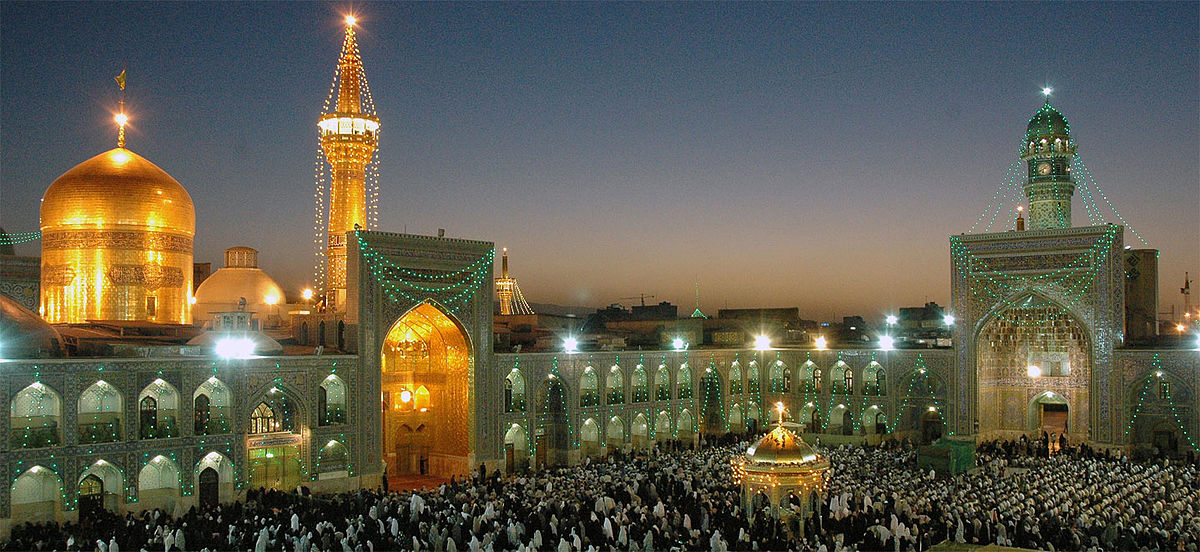
Sanctuary of Imam Reza in Mashhad, Iran, is a complex which contains the mausoleum of Ali al-Rida, the 8th Imam in Shia Islam. 25 Million Shia visit the shrine each year.

After Mecca and Medina, the two holiest cities of Islam, the cities of Najaf, Karbala, Mashhad and Qom are the most revered by Shia Muslims. The Sanctuary of Imām ʿAlī in Najaf, the Shrine of Imam Ḥusayn in Karbala, The Sanctuary of Imam Reza in Mashhad and the Shrine of Fāṭimah al-Maʿṣūmah in Qom are very essential for Shia Muslims. Other venerated pilgrimage sites include the Kadhimiya Mosque in Kadhimiya, Al-Askari Mosque in Samarra, the Sahla Mosque, the Great Mosque of Kufa, the Jamkaran Mosque in Qom, and the Tomb of Daniel in Susa.

Most of the Shia sacred places and heritage sites in Saudi Arabia have been destroyed by the Al Saud-Wahhabi armies of the Ikhwan, the most notable being the tombs of the Imams located in the Al-Baqi' cemetery in 1925. In 2006, a bomb destroyed the shrine of Al-Askari Mosque. (See: Anti-Shi'ism).

=== Purity ===
Shia orthodoxy, particularly in Twelver Shi'ism, has considered non-Muslims as agents of impurity (Najāsat). This categorization sometimes extends to kitābῑ, individuals belonging to the People of the Book, with Jews explicitly labeled as impure by certain Shia religious scholars. Armenians in Iran, who have historically played a crucial role in the Iranian economy, received relatively more lenient treatment.

Shi'ite theologians and mujtahids (jurists), such as Muḥammad Bāqir Majlisῑ, held that Jews' impurity extended to the point where they were advised to stay at home on rainy or snowy days to prevent contaminating their Shia neighbors. Ayatollah Khomeini, Supreme Leader of Iran from 1979 to 1989, asserted that every part of an unbeliever's body, including hair, nails, and bodily secretions, is impure. However, the former leader of Iran, ʿAlī Khameneʾī, stated in a fatwa that Jews and other Peoples of the Book are not inherently impure, and touching the moisture on their hands does not convey impurity.

== Demographics ==
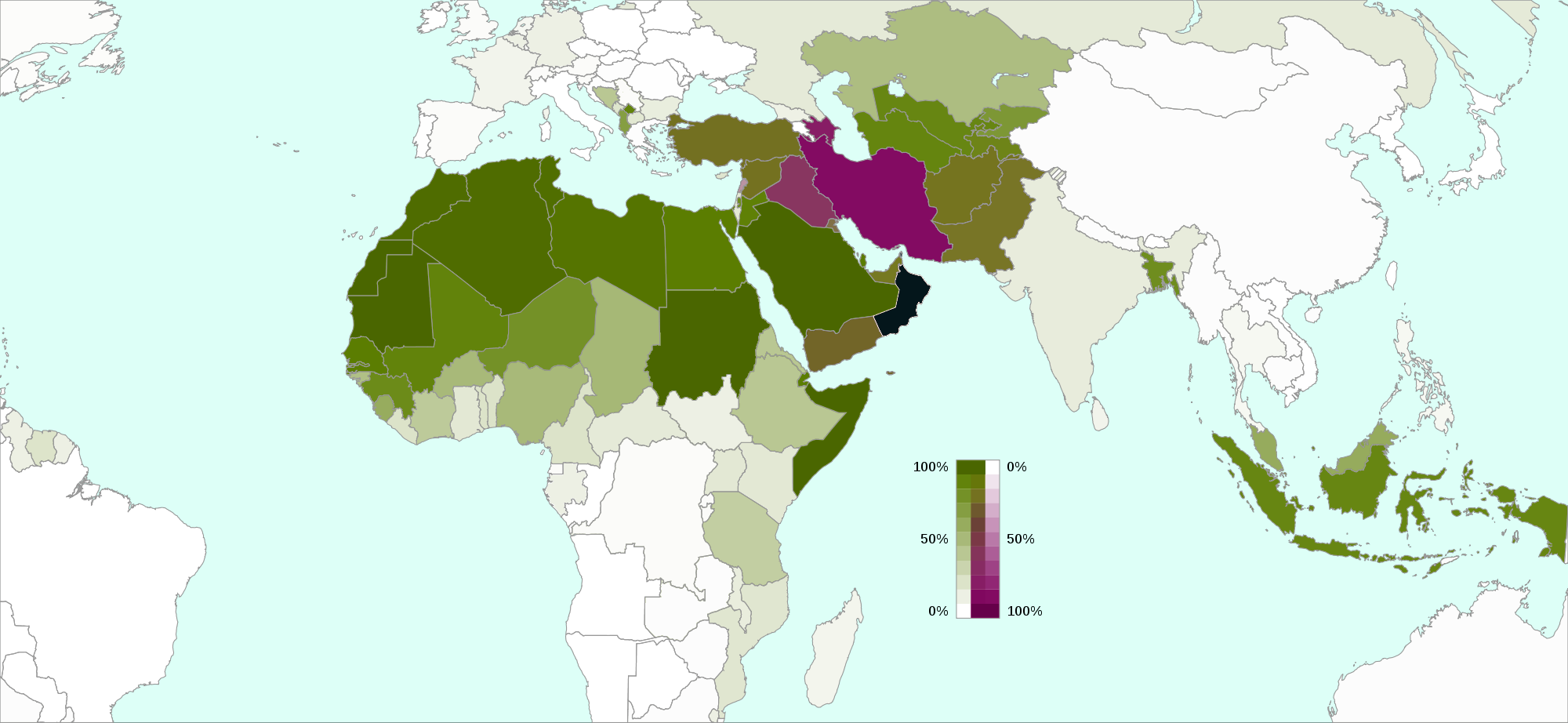
Islam by country Sunnī Shia Ibadi

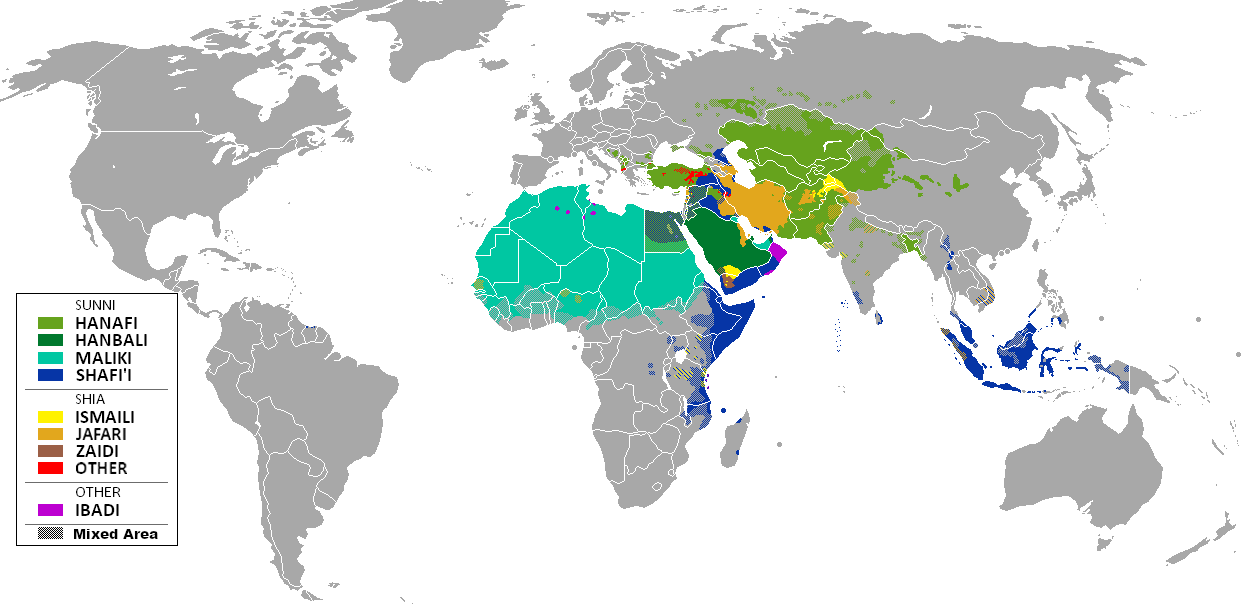
A map of the Muslim world's schools of jurisprudence

Shia Islam is the second largest branch of Islam. It is estimated that 10–13% of the global Muslim population are Shias. They may number up to 154–200 million as of 2009. In 1985, Shia Muslims were estimated to be 21% of the Muslim population in South Asia, although the total number is difficult to estimate.

Shia Muslims form a distinct majority of the population in three countries of the Muslim world: Iran, Iraq, and Azerbaijan. A c. 2008 estimate asserted that Shia Muslims constituted 36.3% of the entire population (and 38.6% of the Muslim population) of the Middle East.

Estimates have placed the proportion of Shia Muslims in Lebanon between 27% and 45% of the population, 30–35% of the citizen population in Kuwait (no figures exist for the non-citizen population), over 20% in Turkey, 5–20% of the population in Pakistan, and 10–19% of Afghanistan's population, and 45% in Bahrain.

Saudi Arabia hosts a number of distinct Shia communities, including the Twelver Baharna in the Eastern Province and Nakhawila of Medina, and the Ismāʿīlī Sulaymani and Zaydī Shias of Najran. Estimations put the number of Shia citizens at roughly 15% of the local population. Approximately 40% of the population of Yemen are Shia Muslims.

Significant Shia communities exist in the coastal regions of West Sumatra and Aceh in Indonesia (see Tabuik). The Shia presence is negligible elsewhere in Southeast Asia, where Muslims are predominantly Shāfiʿī Sunnīs.

A significant Shia minority is present in Nigeria, made up of modern-era converts to a Shia movement centered around Kano and Sokoto states. Several African countries like Kenya, South Africa, Somalia, etc. hold small minority populations of various Shia subsects, primarily descendants of immigrants from South Asia during the colonial period, such as the Khoja.

=== Significant populations worldwide ===
Figures indicated in the first three columns below are based on the October 2009 demographic study by the Pew Research Center report, Mapping the Global Muslim Population.

Nations with over 100,000 Shia
| Country | Article | Shia population in 2009 (Pew) | Percent of population that is Shia in 2009 (Pew) | Percent of global Shia population in 2009 (Pew) | Population estimate ranges and notes |
|---|---|---|---|---|---|
| Iran | Islam in Iran | 66,000,000–69,500,000 | 90–95 | 37–40 | |
| Pakistan | Shia Islam in the Indian subcontinent | 25,272,000 | 15 | 15 | A 2023 census estimate was that Shia made up about 15-20% of Pakistan's population. |
| Iraq | Shi'a Islam in Iraq | 19,000,000–24,000,000 | 55–65 | 10–11 | |
| India | Shia Islam in the Indian subcontinent | 12,300,000–18,500,000 | 1.3–2 | 9–14 | |
| Yemen | Shia Islam in Yemen | 7,000,000–8,000,000 | 35–40 | ~5 | Majority following Zaydi Shia sect. |
| Turkey | Shi'a Islam in Turkey | 6,000,000–9,000,000 | ~10–15 | ~3–4 | Majority following Alevi Shia sect. |
| Azerbaijan | Islam in Azerbaijan | 4,575,000–5,590,000 | 45–55 | 2–3 | Azerbaijan is majority Shia. A 2012 work noted that in Azerbaijan, among believers of all faiths, 10% identified as Sunni, 30% identified as Shia, and the remainder of followers of Islam simply identified as Muslim. |
| Afghanistan | Shi'a Islam in Afghanistan | 3,000,000 | 15 | ~2 | A reliable census has not been taken in Afghanistan in decades, but about 20% of Afghan population is Shia, mostly among ethnic Tajik and Hazara minorities. |
| Syria | Islam in Syria | 2,400,000 | 13 | ~2 | Majority following Alawite Shia sect. |
| Lebanon | Shi'a Islam in Lebanon | 2,100,000 | 31.2 | <1 | In 2020, the CIA World Factbook stated that Shia Muslims constitute 31.2% of Lebanon's population. |
| Saudi Arabia | Shi'a Islam in Saudi Arabia | 2,000,000 | ~6 | | |
| Nigeria | Shi'a Islam in Nigeria | <2,000,000 | <1 | <1 | Estimates range from as low as 2% of Nigeria's Muslim population to as high as 17% of Nigeria's Muslim population. (Note: A 2019 Council on Foreign Relations article states: "Nobody really knows the size of the Shia population in Nigeria. Credible estimates that its numbers range between 2 and 3 percent of Nigeria's population, which would amount to roughly four million." A 2019 BBC News article said that "Estimates of [Nigerian Shia] numbers vary wildly, ranging from less than 5% to 17% of Nigeria's Muslim population of about 100 million.") Some, but not all, Nigerian Shia are affiliated with the banned Islamic Movement in Nigeria, an Iranian-inspired Shia organization led by Ibrahim Zakzaky. |
| Tanzania | Islam in Tanzania | ~1,500,000 | ~2.5 | <1 | |
| Kuwait | Shi'a Islam in Kuwait | 500,000–700,000 | 20–25 | <1 | Among Kuwait's estimated 1.4 million citizens, about 30% are Shia (including Ismaili and Ahmadi, whom the Kuwaiti government count as Shia). Among Kuwait's large expatriate community of 3.3 million noncitizens, about 64% are Muslim, and among expatriate Muslims, about 5% are Shia. |
| Bahrain | Islam in Bahrain | 400,000–500,000 | 65–70 | <1 | |
| Tajikistan | Shi'a Islam in Tajikistan | ~400,000 | ~4 | <1 | Shi'a Muslims in Tajikistan are predominantly Nizari Ismaili |
| Germany | Islam in Germany | ~400,000 | ~0.5 | <1 | |
| United Arab Emirates | Islam in the United Arab Emirates | ~300,000 | ~3 | <1 | |
| United States | Islam in the United States; Shia Islam in the Americas | ~225,000 | ~0.07 | <1 | Shi'a form a majority amongst Arab Muslims in many American cities, e.g. Lebanese Shi'a forming the majority in Detroit. |
| United Kingdom | Islam in the United Kingdom | ~125,000 | ~0.2 | <1 | |
| Qatar | Islam in Qatar | ~100,000 | ~3.5 | <1 | |
| Oman | Islam in Oman | ~100,000 | ~2 | <1 | As of 2015, about 5% of Omanis are Shia (compared to about 50% Ibadi and 45% Sunni). |

== Major denominations or branches ==
The Shia community throughout its history split over the issue of the Imamate. The largest branch are the Twelvers, followed by the Zaydīs and the Ismāʿīlīs. Each subsect of Shia Islam follows its own line of Imamate. All mainstream Twelver and Ismāʿīlī Shia Muslims follow the same school of thought, the Jaʽfari jurisprudence, named after Jaʿfar al-Ṣādiq, the 6th Shia Imam. Shia clergymen and jurists usually carry the title of mujtahid (i.e., someone authorized to issue legal opinions in Shia Islam).

=== Twelver ===
Twelver Shia Islam is the largest branch of Shia Islam, and the terms Shia Muslim and Shia often refer to the Twelvers by default. The designation Twelver is derived from the doctrine of believing in twelve divinely ordained leaders, known as "the Twelve Imams". Twelver Shia are otherwise known as Imami or Jaʿfari; the latter term derives from Jaʿfar al-Ṣādiq, the 6th Shia Imam, who elaborated the Twelver jurisprudence. Twelver Shia constitute the majority of the population in Iran (90%), Iraq (65%) and Azerbaijan (55%). Significant populations also exist in Afghanistan, Bahrain (40% of Muslims) and Lebanon (27–29% of Muslims).

==== Doctrine ====
Twelver doctrine is based on five principles. These five principles known as Usul ad-Din are as follow:

1. Monotheism: God is one and unique;
2. Justice: the concept of moral rightness based on ethics, fairness, and equity, along with the punishment of the breach of these ethics;
3. Prophethood: the institution by which God sends emissaries, or prophets, to guide humankind;
4. Leadership: a divine institution which succeeded the institution of Prophethood. Its appointees (Imams) are divinely appointed;
5. Resurrection and Last Judgment: God's final assessment of humanity.

==== Books ====
Besides the Quran, which is the sacred text common to all Muslims, Twelver Shias derive scriptural and authoritative guidance from collections of sayings and traditions (hadith) attributed to Muhammad and the Twelve Imams. Below is a list of some of the most prominent of these books:

- Nahj al-Balagha by Ash-Sharif Ar-Radhi – the most famous collection of sermons, letters & narration attributed to ʿAlī, the first Imam regarded by Shias
- Kitab al-Kafi by Muhammad ibn Ya'qub al-Kulayni
- Wasa'il al-Shiʻah by al-Hurr al-Amili

==== The Twelve Imams ====
According to the theology of Twelvers, the successor of Muhammad is an infallible human individual who not only rules over the Muslim community with justice but also is able to keep and interpret the divine law (sharīʿa) and its esoteric meaning. The words and deeds of Muhammad and the Twelve Imams are a guide and model for the Muslim community to follow; as a result, they must be free from error and sin, and Imams must be chosen by divine decree (nass) through Muhammad. The twelfth and final Imam is Hujjat Allah al-Mahdi, who is believed by Twelvers to be currently alive and hidden in Occultation.

==== Jurisprudence ====
The Twelver jurisprudence is called Jaʽfari jurisprudence. In this school of Islamic jurisprudence, the sunnah is considered to be comprehensive of the oral traditions of Muhammad and their implementation and interpretation by the Twelve Imams. There are three schools of Jaʿfari jurisprudence: Usuli, Akhbari, and Shaykhi; the Usuli school is by far the largest of the three. Twelver groups that do not follow the Jaʿfari jurisprudence include Alevis, Bektashi, and Qizilbash.

The five pillars of Islam to the Jaʿfari jurisprudence are known as Usul ad-Din:

1. Tawḥīd: unity and oneness of God;
2. Nubuwwah: prophethood of Muhammad;
3. Muʿad: resurrection and final judgment;
4. ʿAdl: justice of God;
5. Imamah: the rightful place of the Shia Imams.

In Jaʿfari jurisprudence, there are eight secondary pillars, known as Furu ad-Din, which are as follows:

1. Salat (prayer);
2. Sawm (fasting);
3. Hajj (pilgrimage) to Mecca;
4. Zakāt (alms giving to the poor);
5. Jihād (struggle) for the righteous cause;
6. Directing others towards good;
7. Directing others away from evil;
8. Khums (20% tax on savings yearly, after deduction of commercial expenses).

According to Twelvers, defining and interpretation of Islamic jurisprudence (fiqh) is the responsibility of Muhammad and the Twelve Imams. Since the 12th Imam is currently in Occultation, it is the duty of Shia clerics to refer to the Islamic literature, such as the Quran and hadith, and identify legal decisions within the confines of Islamic law to provide means to deal with current issues from an Islamic perspective. In other words, clergymen in Twelver Shia Islam are believed to be the guardians of fiqh, which is believed to have been defined by Muhammad and his twelve successors. This process is known as ijtihad and the clerics are known as marjaʿ, meaning "reference"; the labels Allamah and Ayatollah are in use for Twelver clerics.

==== Islamists ====
Islamist Shia (Persian: تشیع اخوانی) is a new denomination within Twelver Shia Islam greatly inspired by the political ideology of the Muslim Brotherhood and mysticism of Ibn Arabi. It sees Islam as a political system and differs from the other mainstream Usuli and Akhbari groups in favoring the idea of the establishment of an Islamic state in Occultation under the rule of the 12th Imam. Hadi Khosroshahi was the first person to identify himself as ikhwani (Islamist) Shia Muslim.

Because of the concept of the hidden Imam, Muhammad al-Mahdi, Shia Islam is inherently secular in the age of Occultation, therefore Islamist Shia Muslims had to borrow ideas from Sunnī Islamists and adjust them in accordance with the doctrine of Shia Islam. Its foundations were laid during the Persian Constitutional Revolution at the start of 20th century in Qajar Empire (1905–1911), when Fazlullah Nouri supported the Persian king Ahmad Shah Qajar against the will of Muhammad Kazim Khurasani, the Usuli marjaʿ of the time.

=== Ismāʿīlī ===
Ismāʿīlīs, otherwise known as Sevener, derive their name from their acceptance of Ismāʿīl ibn Jaʿfar as the divinely appointed spiritual successor (Imam) to Jaʿfar al-Ṣādiq, the 6th Shia Imam, wherein they differ from the Twelvers, who recognize Mūsā al-Kāẓim, younger brother of Ismāʿīl, as the true Imam.

After the death or Occultation of Muhammad ibn Imam Ismāʿīl in the 8th century CE, the teachings of Ismāʿīlīsm further transformed into the belief system as it is known today, with an explicit concentration on the deeper, esoteric meaning (bāṭin) of the Islamic faith. With the eventual development of Twelver Shia Islam into the more literalistic (zahīr) oriented Akhbari and later Usuli schools of thought, Shia Islam further developed in two separate directions: the metaphorical Ismāʿīlī group focusing on the mystical path and nature of God and the divine manifestation in the personage of the "Imam of the Time" as the "Face of God", with the more literalistic Twelver group focusing on divine law (sharī'ah) and the deeds and sayings (sunnah) attributed to Muhammad and his successors (the Ahl al-Bayt), who as A'immah were guides and a light (nūr) to God.

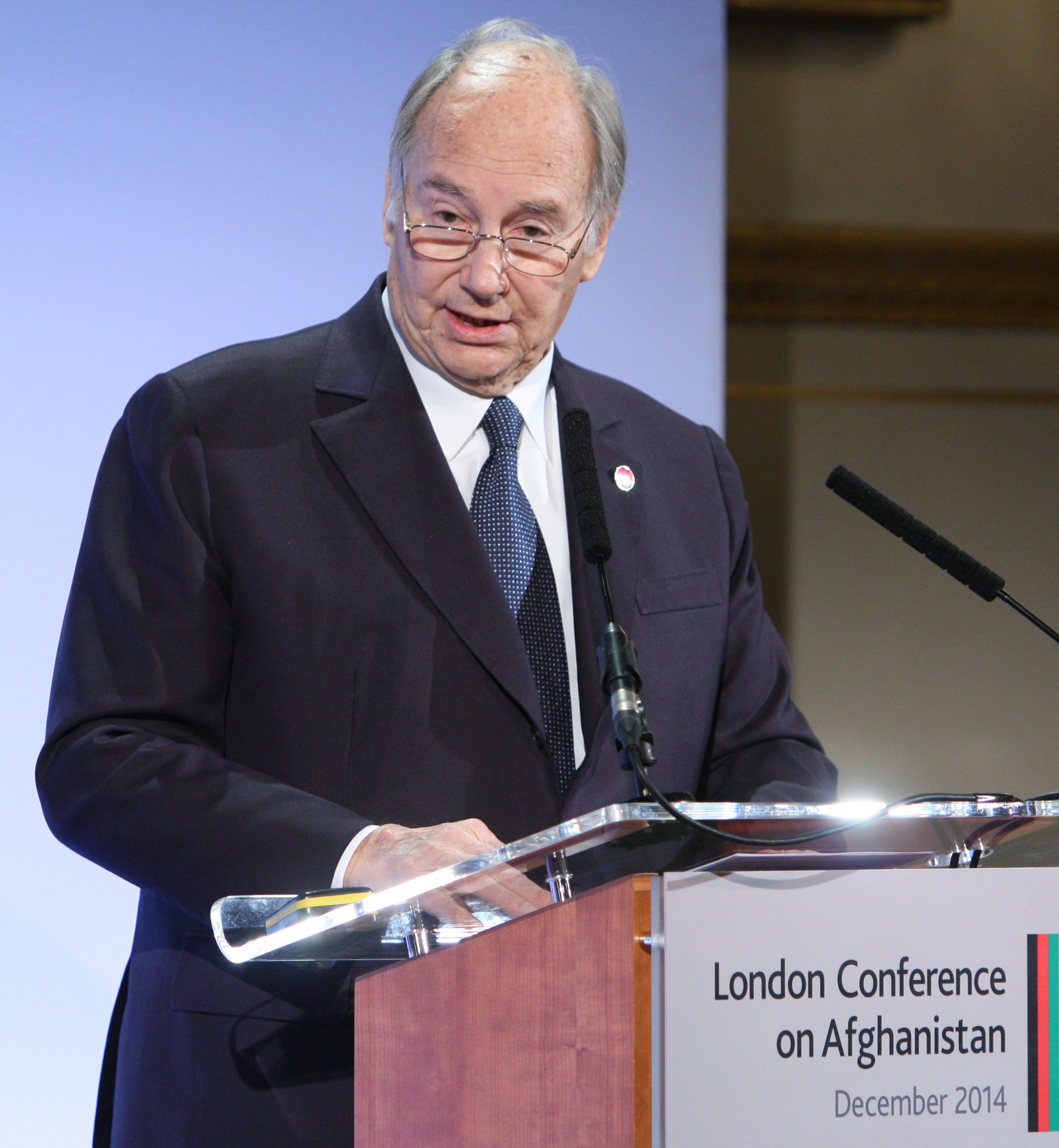
Shāh Karim al-Husayni, known as the Aga Khan IV, was the 49th Imam of Nizārī Ismāʿīlīs.

Though there are several subsects amongst the Ismāʿīlīs, the term in today's vernacular generally refers to the Shia Imami Ismāʿīlī Nizārī community, often referred to as the Ismāʿīlīs by default, who are followers of the Aga Khan and the largest group within Ismāʿīlīsm. Another Shia Imami Ismāʿīlī community are the Dawudi Bohras, led by a Da'i al-Mutlaq ("Unrestricted Missionary") as representative of a hidden Imam. While there are many other branches with extremely differing exterior practices, much of the spiritual theology has remained the same since the days of the faith's early Imams. In recent centuries, Ismāʿīlīs have largely been an Indo-Iranian community, but they can also be found in India, Pakistan, Syria, Palestine, Saudi Arabia, Yemen, Jordan, Uzbekistan, Tajikistan, Afghanistan, East and South Africa, and in recent years several Ismāʿīlīs have emigrated to China, Western Europe (primarily in the United Kingdom), Australia, New Zealand, and North America.

==== Ismāʿīlī Imams ====
In the Nizārī Ismāʿīlī interpretation of Shia Islam, the Imam is the guide and the intercessor between humans and God, and the individual through whom God is recognized. He is also responsible for the esoteric interpretation of the Quran (taʾwīl). He is the possessor of divine knowledge and therefore the "Prime Teacher". According to the "Epistle of the Right Path", a Persian Ismāʿīlī prose text from the post-Mongol period of Ismāʿīlī history, by an anonymous author, there has been a chain of Imams since the beginning of time, and there will continue to be an Imam present on the Earth until the end of time. The worlds would not exist in perfection without this uninterrupted chain of Imams. The proof (hujja) and gate (bāb) of the Imam are always aware of his presence and are witness to this uninterrupted chain.

After the death of Ismāʿīl ibn Jaʿfar, many Ismāʿīlīs believed that one day the eschatological figure of Imam Mahdi, whom they believed to be Muhammad ibn Imam Ismāʿīl, would return and establish an age of justice. One group included the violent Qarmatians, who had a stronghold in Bahrain. In contrast, some Ismāʿīlīs believed the Imamate did continue, and that the Imams were in Occultation and still communicated and taught their followers through a network of Da'i ("Missionaries").

In 909 CE, Abdullah al-Mahdi Billah, a claimant to the Ismāʿīlī Imamate, established the Fatimid Caliphate. During this period, three lineages of Imams were formed. The first branch, known today as the Druze, began with Al-Ḥākim bi-Amr Allāh. Born in 985 CE, he ascended as ruler at the age of eleven. When in 1021 CE his mule returned without him, soaked in blood, a religious group that was forming in his lifetime broke off from mainstream Ismāʿīlīsm and did not acknowledge his successor.

Later to be known as the Druze, they believe Al-Ḥākim to be God incarnate and the prophesied Mahdi on Earth, who would one day return and bring justice to the world. The Druze faith further split from Ismāʿīlīsm as it developed into a distinct monotheistic Abrahamic religion and ethno-religious group with its own unique doctrines, and finally separated from both Ismāʿīlīsm and Islam altogether. Thus, the Druze do not identify themselves as Muslims, and are not considered as such by Muslims either.

The second split occurred between Nizārī and Musta'lī Ismāʿīlīs following the death of Ma'ad al-Mustansir Billah in 1094 CE. His rule was the longest of any caliph in any Islamic empire. Upon his death, his sons, Nizār (the older) and Al-Musta'lī (the younger), fought for political and spiritual control of the dynasty. Nizār was defeated and jailed, but according to the Nizārī tradition his son escaped to Alamut, where the Iranian Ismāʿīlī had accepted his claim. From here on, the Nizārī Ismāʿīlī community has continued with a present, living Imam.

The Musta'lī Ismāʿīlīs split between the Ṭayyibi and the Ḥāfiẓi; Ṭayyibi Ismāʿīlīs, also known as "Bohras", are further divided between Dawudi Bohras, Sulaymani Bohras, and Alavi Bohras. The former denomination claims that At-Tayyib Abi l-Qasim, son of Al-Amir bi-Ahkami l-Lah, and the Imams following him went into a period of anonymity (Dawr-e-Satr) and appointed a Da'i al-Mutlaq ("Unrestricted Missionary") to guide the community, in a similar manner as the Ismāʿīlīs had lived after the death of Muhammad ibn Imam Ismāʿīl. The latter denomination claims that the ruling Fatimid caliph was the Imam, and they died out with the fall of the Fatimid Empire.

==== Pillars ====
Ismāʿīlīs have categorized their practices which are known as seven pillars:

- Walayah (Guardianship)
- Taharah (Purity)
- Salat (Prayer)
- Zakāt (Charity)
- Sawm (Fasting)
- Hajj (Pilgrimage)
- Jihad (Struggle)

==== Contemporary leadership ====
The Nizārīs place importance on a scholarly institution because of the existence of a present Imam. The Imam of the Age defines the jurisprudence, and his guidance may differ with Imams previous to him because of different times and circumstances. For Nizārī Ismāʿīlīs, the current Imam is Karim al-Husayni Aga Khan IV. The Nizārī line of Imams has continued to this day as an uninterrupted chain.

Divine leadership has continued in the Bohra branch through the institution of the "Missionary" (Da'i). According to the Bohra tradition, before the last Imam, At-Tayyib Abi l-Qasim, went into seclusion, his father, the 20th Al-Amir bi-Ahkami l-Lah, had instructed Al-Hurra Al-Malika the Malika (Queen consort) in Yemen to appoint a vicegerent after the seclusion—the Da'i al-Mutlaq ("Unrestricted Missionary"), who as the Imam's vicegerent has full authority to govern the community in all matters both spiritual and temporal while the lineage of Musta'lī-Ṭayyibi Imams remains in seclusion (Dawr-e-Satr). The three branches of Musta'lī Ismāʿīlīs (Dawudi Bohras, Sulaymani Bohras, and Alavi Bohras) differ on who the current "Unrestricted Missionary" is.

=== Zaydī ===
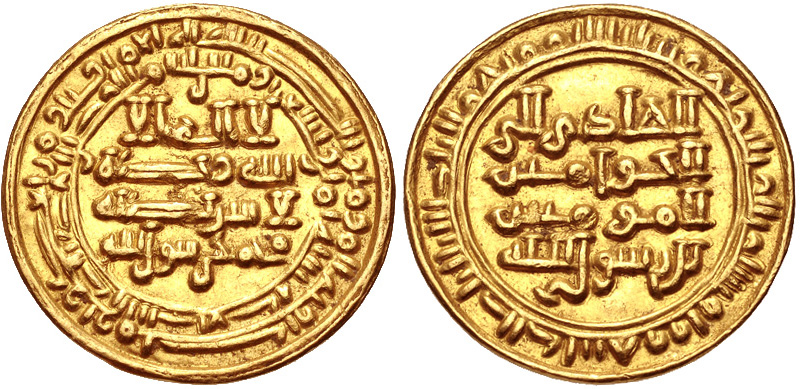
Gold dinar of al-Ḥādī ila'l-Ḥaqq Yaḥyā, the first Zaydī Imam of Yemen, minted in 910–911 CE

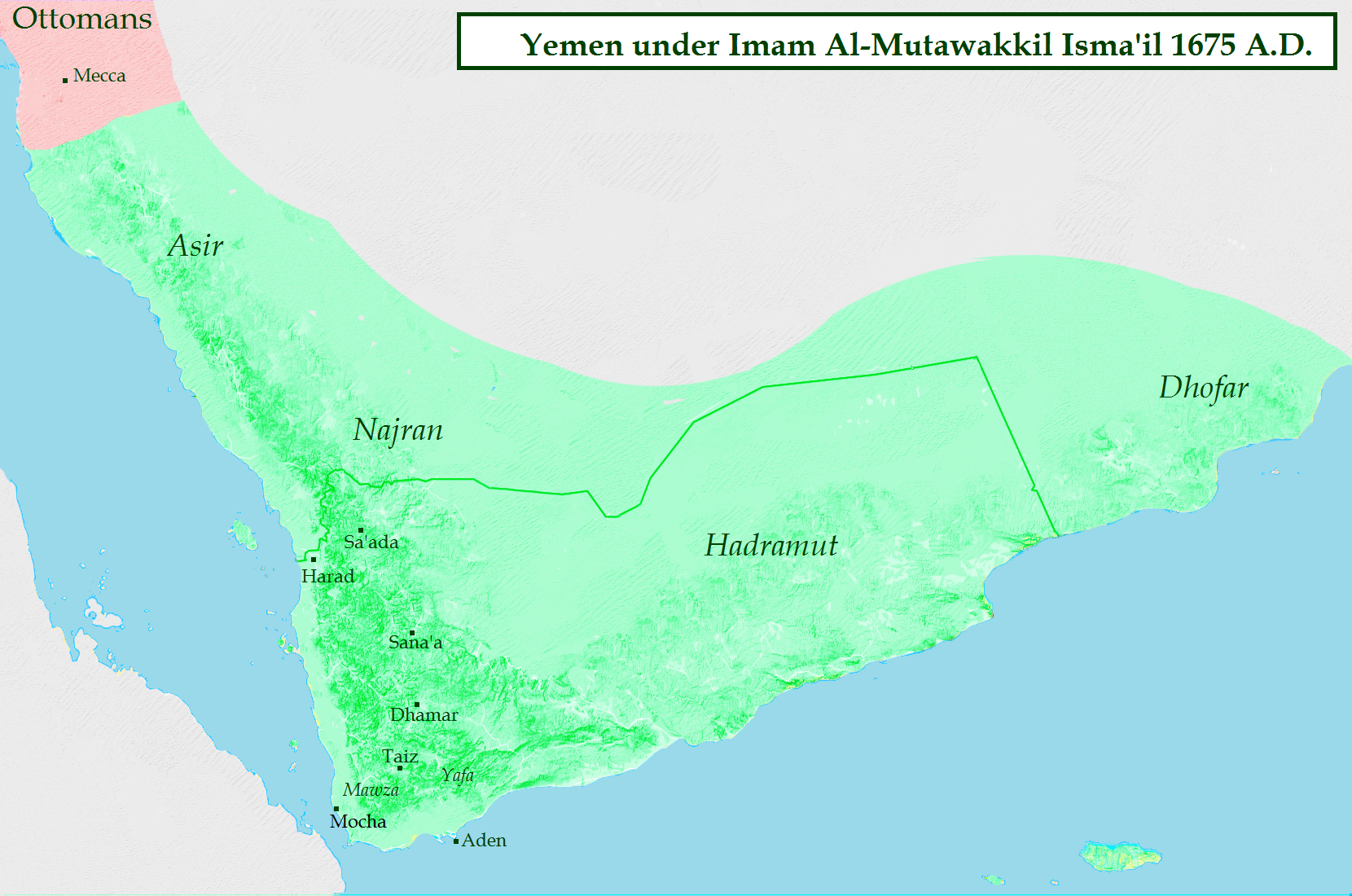
The Zaydī State of Yemen under the rule of Imam Al-Mutawakkil Ismāʿīl bin al-Qāsim (1644–1676)

Zaydism, otherwise known as Zaydiyya or as Zaydi Shia Islam, is a branch of Shia Islam named after Zayd ibn ʿAlī. Followers of the Zaydī school of jurisprudence are called Zaydīs or occasionally Fivers. However, there is also a group called Zaydī Wāsiṭīs who are Twelvers (see below). Zaydīs constitute roughly 42–47% of the population of Yemen.

==== Doctrine ====
The Zaydīs, Twelvers, and Ismāʿīlīs all recognize the same first four Imams; however, the Zaydīs consider Zayd ibn ʿAlī as the 5th Imam. After the time of Zayd ibn ʿAlī, the Zaydīs believed that any descendant (Sayyid) of Ḥasan ibn ʿAlī or Ḥusayn ibn ʿAlī could become the next Imam, after fulfilling certain conditions. Other well-known Zaydī Imams in history were Yahya ibn Zayd, Muhammad al-Nafs al-Zakiyya, and Ibrahim ibn Abdullah.

The Zaydī doctrine of Imamah does not presuppose the infallibility of the Imam, nor the belief that the Imams are supposed to receive divine guidance. Moreover, Zaydīs do not believe that the Imamate must pass from father to son but believe it can be held by any Sayyid descended from either Ḥasan ibn ʿAlī or Ḥusayn ibn ʿAlī (as was the case after the death of the former). Historically, Zaydīs held that Zayd ibn ʿAlī was the rightful successor of the 4th Imam since he led a rebellion against the Umayyads in protest of their tyranny and corruption. Muhammad al-Baqir did not engage in political action, and the followers of Zayd ibn ʿAlī maintained that a true Imam must fight against corrupt rulers.

==== Jurisprudence ====
In matters of Islamic jurisprudence, Zaydīs follow the teachings of Zayd ibn ʿAlī, which are documented in his book Majmu'l Fiqh (in Arabic: مجموع الفِقه). Al-Ḥādī ila'l-Ḥaqq Yaḥyā, the first Zaydī Imam and founder of the Zaydī State in Yemen, is regarded as the codifier of Zaydī jurisprudence, and as such most Zaydī Shias today are known as Hadawis.

==== Timeline ====
The Idrisids (Arabic: الأدارسة) were Arab Zaydī Shias whose dynasty, named after its first sultan, Idris I, ruled in the western Maghreb from 788 to 985 CE. Another Zaydī State was established in the region of Gilan, Deylaman, and Tabaristan (northern Iran) in 864 CE by the Alavids; it lasted until the death of its leader at the hand of the Samanids in 928 CE. Roughly forty years later, the Zaydī State was revived in Gilan and survived under Hasanid leaders until 1126 CE. Afterwards, from the 12th to 13th centuries, the Zaydī Shias of Deylaman, Gilan, and Tabaristan then acknowledged the Zaydī Imams of Yemen or rival Zaydī Imams within Iran.

The Buyids were initially Zaydī Shias, as were the Banu Ukhaidhir rulers of al-Yamama in the 9th and 10th centuries. The leader of the Zaydī community took the title of caliph; thus, the ruler of Yemen was known by this title. Al-Hadi Yahya bin al-Hussain bin al-Qasim ar-Rassi, a descendant of Ḥasan ibn ʿAlī, founded the Zaydī Imamate at Sa'dah in 893–897 CE, and the Rassid dynasty continued to rule over Yemen until the middle of the 20th century, when the republican revolution of 1962 deposed the last Zaydī Imam. See: Arab Cold War.

The founding Zaydī branch in Yemen was the Jarudiyya. With increasing interaction with the Ḥanafī and Shāfiʿī schools of Sunnī jurisprudence, there was a shift from the Jarudiyya group to the Sulaimaniyya, Tabiriyya, Butriyya, and Salihiyya. Zaydī Shias form the second dominant religious group in Yemen. Currently, they constitute about 40–45% of the population in Yemen; Jaʿfaris and Ismāʿīlīs constitute the 2–5%. In Saudi Arabia there are over 1 million Zaydī Shias, primarily in the western provinces.

Currently, the most prominent Zaydī political movement is the Houthi movement in Yemen, known by the name of Shabab al-Mu'mineen ("Believing Youth") or Ansar Allah ("Partisans of God"). In 2014–2015, Houthis took over the Yemeni government in Sanaa, which led to the fall of the Saudi Arabian-backed government of Abd Rabbuh Mansur Hadi. Houthis and their allies gained control of a significant part of Yemen's territory, and resisted the Saudi Arabian-led intervention in Yemen seeking to restore Hadi in power. (See: Iran–Saudi Arabia proxy conflict). Both the Houthis and the Saudi Arabian-led coalition were being attacked by the Sunnī Islamist militant group and Salafi-jihadist terrorist organization ISIL/ISIS/IS/Daesh.

== Persecution of Shia Muslims ==
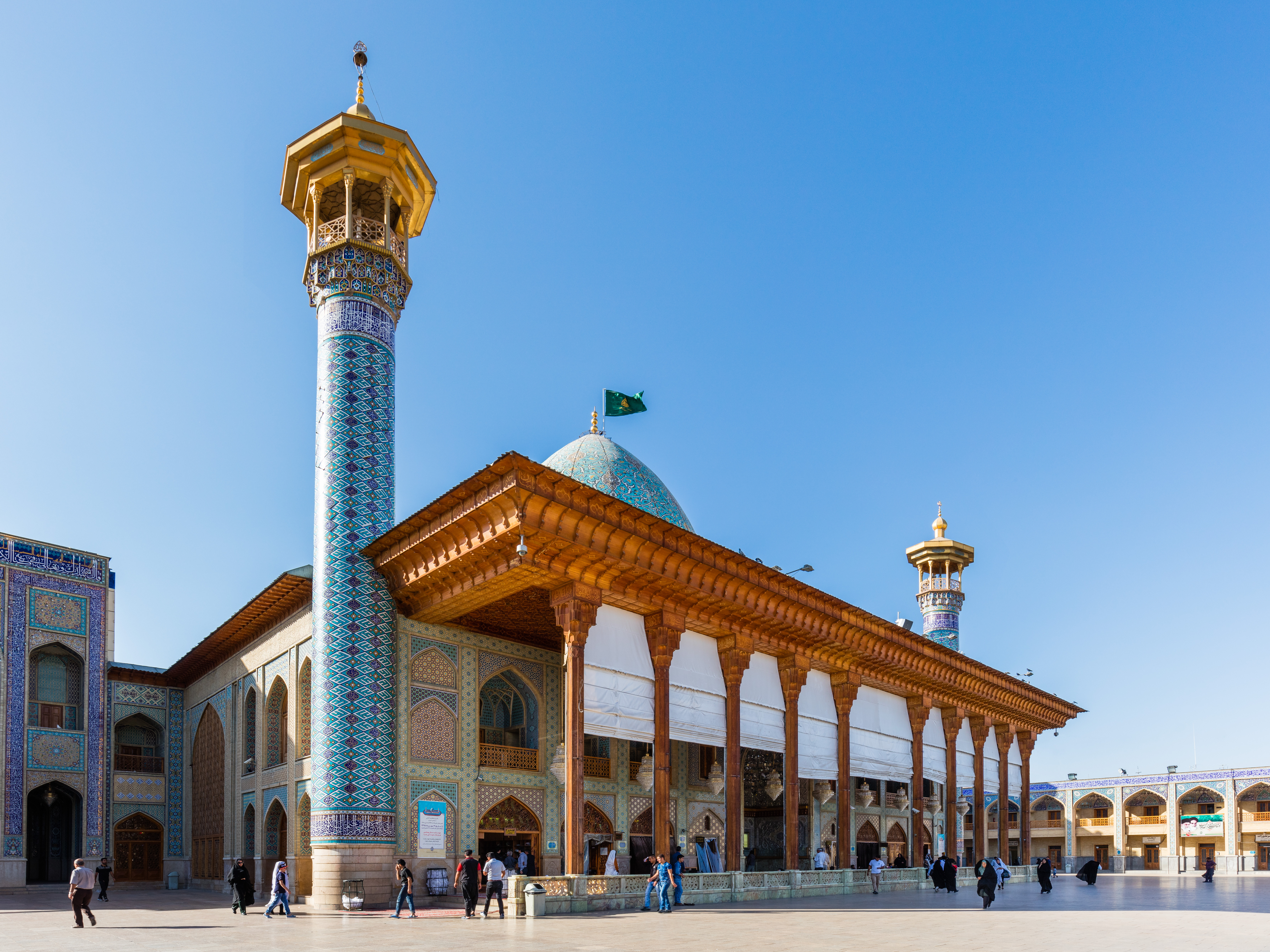
Shāh Cherāgh in Shiraz, Iran, houses the mausoleums of the two sons of Musa al-Kazim, the seventh Imam in Twelver Shia Islam and a descendant of Muhammad.

The history of Shia–Sunni relations has often involved religious discrimination, persecution, and violence, dating back to the earliest development of the two competing sects. At various times throughout the history of Islam, Shia groups and minorities have faced persecution perpetrated by Sunnī Muslims.

Militarily established and holding control over the Umayyad government, many Sunnī rulers perceived the Shias as a threat—both to their political and religious authority. The Sunnī rulers under the Umayyad dynasty sought to marginalize the Shia minority, and later the Abbasids turned on their Shia allies and imprisoned, persecuted, and killed them. The persecution of Shia Muslims throughout history by their Sunnī co-religionists has often been characterized by brutal and genocidal acts. Comprising only about 10–15% of the global Muslim population, Shia Muslims remain a marginalized community to this day in many Sunnī-dominant Arab countries, and are denied the rights to practice their religion and freely organize.

In 1514, the Ottoman sultan Selim I (1512–1520) ordered the massacre of 40,000 Alevis and Bektashi (Anatolian Shia Muslims). According to Jalal Al-e-Ahmad, "Sultan Selim I carried things so far that he announced that the killing of one Shia had as much otherworldly reward as killing 70 Christians." In 1802, the Al Saud-Wahhabi armies of the Ikhwan from the First Saudi State (1727–1818) attacked and sacked the city of Karbala, the Shia shrine in Najaf (eastern region of Iraq) that commemorates the martyrdom and death of Ḥusayn ibn ʿAlī.

During the rule of Saddam Hussein's Ba'athist Iraq, Shia political activists were arrested, tortured, expelled or killed, as part of a crackdown launched after an assassination attempt against Iraq's Deputy Prime Minister Tariq Aziz in 1980. In March 2011, the Malaysian government declared Shia Islam a "deviant" sect and banned Shia Muslims from promoting their faith to other Muslims, but left them free to practice it themselves privately.

The most recent campaign of anti-Shia oppression was the Islamic State organization's persecution of Shias in its territories in Northern Iraq, which occurred alongside the persecution of various religious groups and the genocide of Yazidis by the same organization.

== See also ==
- Alawism – Offshoot of Shia Islam in the Levant
- Criticism of Twelver Shia Islam
- Islamic primary rulings – First tranche of Islamic commandments
- List of Shia books
- List of Shia Islamic dynasties
- List of Shia Muslim scholars of Islam
- List of Shia Muslims
- Shi'ite iconography
- Shia crescent – Region in the Middle East
- Shia Rights Watch – Shia Muslim-rights advocacy organization
- Shia view of the Quran
- Tatbir – Self-flagellation ritual practiced by some Shia Muslims
