= Islamic secondary rulings =

Islamic secondary rulings (Persian:احکام ثانویه) from the Shia perspective the perspective of Islam religion, are those deduced by a fully qualified jurist with due consideration for the circumstances and conditions of an individual or society. An example of this category of laws is the fatwa issued by Mirza Mohammed Hassan Husseini Shirazi forbidding the use of Tobacco Protest.""""

== The difference between the primary and secondary rulings ==
The difference between the primary and secondary rulings can be explained as follows:""""

- An important point to note in connection with the secondary rulings is that they relate to the category of actions and affairs that are generally considered mubāh or neutral. The primary rulings, on the other hand, are not changeable on any account.
- The primary rulings which are suspended in case of idtirār (exigency), ijbār (coercion), or karāhiyyah (reprehensibility) should not be confused with the secondary rulings (al‑ahkam al‑thanawiyyah). For instance, in case of insecurity of roads and sea routes the faqih may suspend the obligation of the hajj. This is not a secondary ruling because the duty of hajj is suspended, since 'ilm (knowledge), ikhtiyār (freedom) and qudrah (power) are the fundamental requirements for the application of an obligatory duty.
- With the disappearance of the cause and motive behind the secondary rulings, their validity expires and the domain of its application returns to the sphere of primary rulings.
