= Administrative policies of Ali =

Period of Islamic rule

Administrative policies of Ali ibn Abi Talib highlights the policies of Ali, the son-in-law and cousin of the Islamic prophet Muhammad (d. 632). Ali is recognized as the first Shia imam and the fourth Rashidun caliph. He was acclaimed as the caliph in 656 CE after the assassination of his predecessor Uthman, who was killed by Egyptian rebels amidst widespread accusations of nepotism, injustice, and corruption. Ali undertook radical changes upon accession and his strictly egalitarian policies garnered him the support of underprivileged groups while alienating the powerful Quraysh tribe, some of whom revolted against Ali under the pretext of revenge for Uthman in the Battle of the Camel (656) and the protracted Battle of Siffin (657). The latter fight ended in arbitration and led to the creation of the Kharijites, a member of whom is thought to be responsible for the assassination of Ali in 661. For some, the brief caliphate of Ali was characterized by his honesty, his unbending devotion to Islam, his equal treatment of the supporters, and his magnanimity towards his defeated enemies, while others criticize his policies for idealism and lack of political expediency.

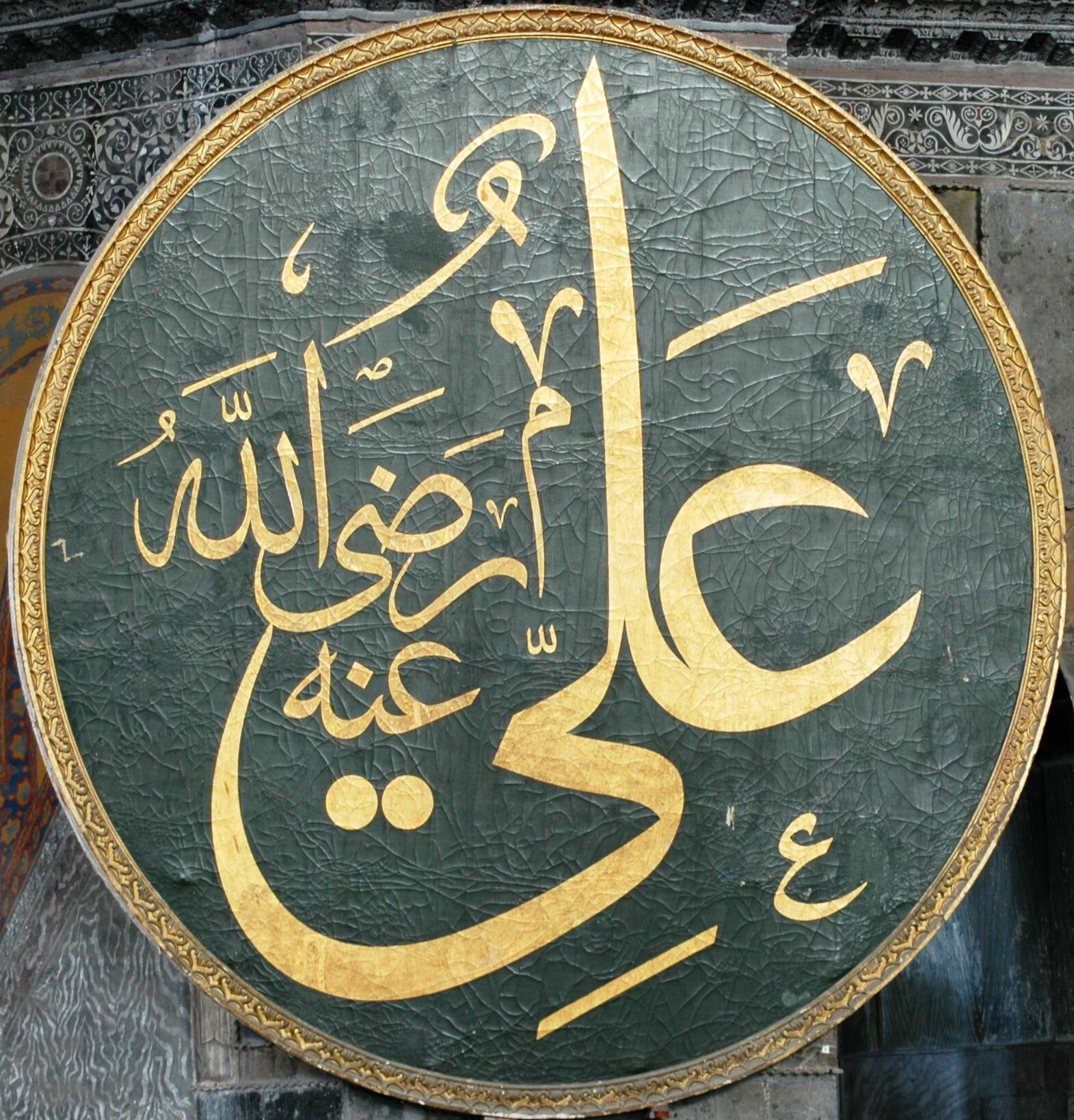
Ali may have been the first male to profess Islam.

Territories of the Rashidun empire under the four caliphs. The divided phase corresponds to the caliphate of Ali. Strongholds of the Rashidun Caliphate Vassal states of the Rashidun Caliphate Territories controlled by Mu'awiya I during the civil war (656–661) Territories controlled by Amr ibn al-As during civil war (658–661)

== Justice ==
The Islamicist Laura Veccia Vaglieri (d. 1989) describes Ali as deeply devoted to the cause of Islam, and her view is echoed by some others. The brief caliphate of Ali was thus characterized by his strict justice, as suggested by some authors, including Reza Shah-Kazemi, Wilferd Madelung, Moojan Momen, Mahmoud M. Ayoub (d. 2021), John Esposito, and Hassan Abbas, among others. In his inaugural speech, Ali rebuked Muslims for straying from the straight path after Muhammad, and stressed the need to bring forth the virtuous and send back the unworthy. He also promised there to repossess the public lands gifted by Uthman during his caliphate.

Intent on restoring his vision of the prophetic governance, Ali thus undertook radical policies during his caliphate, which the Shia scholar Muhammad H. Tabatabai (d. 1981) describes as "revolutionary." The caliph immediately dismissed nearly all the governors who had served Uthman, explaining that the likes of those men should not be appointed to any office. He replaced them with men whom he considered pious, largely from the Ansar and the Banu Hashim. Ali also distributed the treasury funds equally among Muslims, apparently following the practice of Muhammad. He is said to have shown zero tolerance for corruption, as apparent from his instructions for his commander Malik al-Ashtar (d. 657), and also from his letters of admonition to his official Ziyad ibn Abihi, and his cousin Ibn Abbas.

=== Modern views ===
It was perhaps these radical policies of Ali which compelled the disgruntled to revolt under the pretext of revenge for Uthman, notable among them Mu'awiya, the former governor of Syria under Uthman. Veccia Vaglieri thus criticizes Ali for his "excessive rigorism," adding that he lacked political flexibility. Madelung similarly views the above policies of Ali as an indication of his political naivety and his unwillingness to compromise his principles for political expediency. Mahmoud M. Ayoub (d. 2021) says that Ali was not politically naive but idealistic, adding that the uncompromising uprightness of Ali and his strictly egalitarian policies alienated the Arabs and the powerful Quraysh tribe, in particular. Both authors, however, concede that these qualities of Ali also turned him into a paragon of Islamic virtues for his followers. In his defense, Tabatabai and Ayoub propound that Ali ruled with righteousness rather than political expediency.

Yet Ayoub also suggests that political flexibility was a quality of Muhammad, though this is rejected by Tabatabai, who asserts that Islam never allows for compromising on a just cause, quoting verse 68:9, "They wish that thou might compromise and that they might compromise." To support his view, Tabatabai notes that Muhammad repeatedly rejected calls for peace from his enemies in return for leaving their gods alone. In this vein, Shah-Kazemi writes that Muhammad indeed appointed some of his erstwhile enemies to leadership positions, but only to give them an opportunity to redeem themselves after accepting Islam, without compromising his principles. In contrast, confirming those whom Ali dismissed would have been tantamount to overlooking their corruption and undermining the moral basis of his caliphate. Alternatively, Ali Bahramian proposes that replacing the governors was the only available course of action for Ali, both on principle and in practice. He writes that injustice was the main grievance of the provincial rebels and they would have turned against Ali had he confirmed Uthman's governors. This is echoed by Shah-Kazemi, who adds that the equal distribution of the state wealth by Ali was a necessary change to address the inevitable societal impacts of the gross inequalities created under Umar and Uthman.

== Religious authority ==
Ali viewed himself not only as the temporal leader of the Muslim community but also as its exclusive religious authority. This is evident in his inaugural speech as the caliph, writes Madelung, while the historian Hugh N. Kennedy adds that Ali saw the ruler as a charismatic figure who guides the Islamic community. Ali thus laid claim to the religious authority to interpret the Quran and Sunnah, and particularly the esoteric message of the script. He is reported by al-Tabari to have said, "We fought against them on the exoteric (zahir) content of the revelation and today we are fighting them for its esoteric (batin) message." This claim of Ali distinguished him from his predecessors who have been viewed as merely the administrators of the divine law.

In return, some supporters of Ali indeed held him as their divinely-guided leader who demanded the same type of loyalty that Muhammad did. These felt an absolute and all-encompassing bond of spiritual loyalty (walaya) to Ali that transcended politics. The existence of this group is evidenced by Sunni and Shia reports from the Battle of Siffin (657) and some literary works dating to the First Fitna (656-661). Indeed, when the Kharijites broke with Ali after this battle, some forty-thousand of his supporters offered him a second bay'ah and pledged to be friends to the friends of Ali and enemies to his enemies. The ranks of these devoted supporters likely included the Ansar and the tribes from southern Arabia. These supporters may have justified their absolute loyalty to Ali on the basis of his merits, precedent in Islam, his kinship with Muhammad, and also the announcement by the latter at the Ghadir Khumm shortly before his death in 632. It is also probable that many of these supporters viewed Ali as the legatee (wasi) of Muhammad and thus his rightful successor after his death, as evidenced in the poetry from the period. The word wasi also appears in Malik's address at the inauguration of Ali in Tarikh al-Ya'qubi. There is, however, a report by the Sunni historian al-Tabari (d. 923) that links the notion of Ali as the wasi of Muhammad to the legendary figure of Abd Allah ibn Saba. In turn, such a link is rejected by the Islamicist Maria M. Dakake, who believes that the term was widely used among the supporters of Ali by the time of the Battle of Siffin. Her view is close to that offered by Husain M. Jafri (d. 2019), another expert. At the same time, the Shia representation of Abu Bakr and Umar as usurpers of Ali's rights is absent in the (Sunni) historical discourse from that period.

== Fiscal policies ==
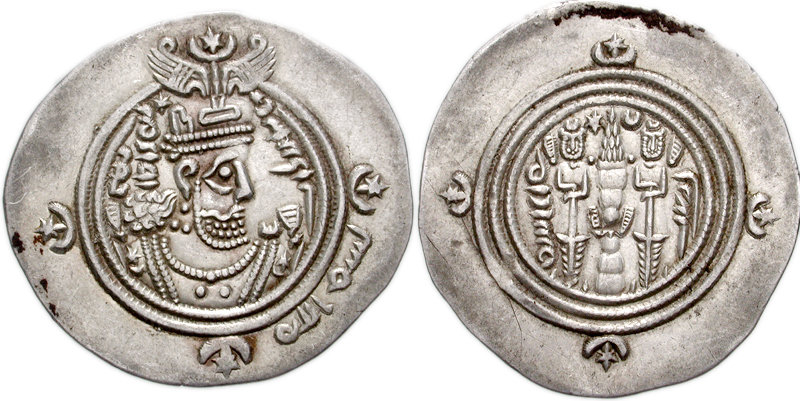
Coin minted under Ali's Caliphate in Bishapur, 36 AH/656CE

Ali opposed centralized control over provincial revenues. He also equally distributed the taxes and booty amongst Muslims, following the precedent of Muhammad. Ayoub and Jafri write that Ali distributed the content of the treasury of Kufa every Friday. This practice may indicate the egalitarian views of Ali, who thus attempted to unravel the social order established under his predecessors: Umar distributed the state revenues according to perceived Islamic merit and precedence, which nevertheless led to class differences in the Islamic community, placing the Quraysh above the rest of Arabs, and Arabs above non-Arabs. Umar apparently later came to regret this system, which replaced the Quranic principle of equality among the faithful. In turn, Uthman was widely accused of nepotism and corruption. During his caliphate, the tribal elites returned to power at the cost of the early Muslims.

The departure of Ali from the status quo on the distribution of revenues particularly appealed to the late immigrants to Iraq, among whom were the non-Arab converts in Kufa, for whom Ali championed a universalist vision of Islam which offered them equal rights. More generally, the egalitarian policies of Ali earned him the support of nearly all underprivileged groups, including the Ansar, who were sidelined after Muhammad by the Qurayshite leadership, and the qurra (lit. 'Quran readers'), who sought pious Islamic leadership. This latter group of early Muslims were interested in restoring the social order of Umar and saw Ali as their best hope for achieving that. In contrast, Talha and Zubayr were both Qurayshite companions of Muhammad who had amassed immense wealth under Uthman. They both revolted against Ali after the caliph refused to grant them favors. Some other figures among the Quraysh also turned against Ali for the same reason, write Ayoub and John McHugo. Ali is said to have even rejected a request by his brother Aqil for public funds, whereas Mu'awiya readily offered all of them bribes. By comparison, Ali continued to pay the Kharijites their shares from the treasury after they rose against him. Regarding taxation, Ali instructed his officials to collect payments on a voluntary basis and without harassment, and to prioritize the poor when distributing the funds. Ali was concerned with agriculture, suggests Ann Lambton, and instructed Malik al-Ashtar in a letter to pay more attention to land development than short-term taxation.

== Islamic sciences ==
Tabatabai contends that the Islamic sciences were largely overlooked during the Muslim conquests, with the immense material wealth they brought. He adds that it was also forbidden after Muhammad to commit his sayings (hadiths) to writing, citing the Sunni al-Tabari and Ibn Sa'd (d. 845). In contrast, Ali used his rule to disseminate Islamic sciences, writes Tabatabai, pioneering Arabic grammar and Islamic metaphysics. Shah-Kazemi suggests that the public sermons attributed to Ali in Nahj al-balagha go beyond addressing the basic ethical and religious needs of the Muslim community, for they are replete with higher esoteric teachings. To show the dedication of Ali to knowledge (ilm), Shah-Kazemi highlights his answer during the Battle of the Camel (656) to a question about the oneness of God (tawhid), "That which has no second (God) does not enter into the category of number." Ali also trained students, among whom are the first scholars in jurisprudence, theology, Quranic exegesis and recitation, and also the forefathers of Sufism, including Uways al-Qarani, Kumayl ibn Ziyad, Maytham al-Tammar, Roshaid al-Hajari, Hasan al-Basri, and al-Rabi' ibn Khaytham.

== Rules of war ==
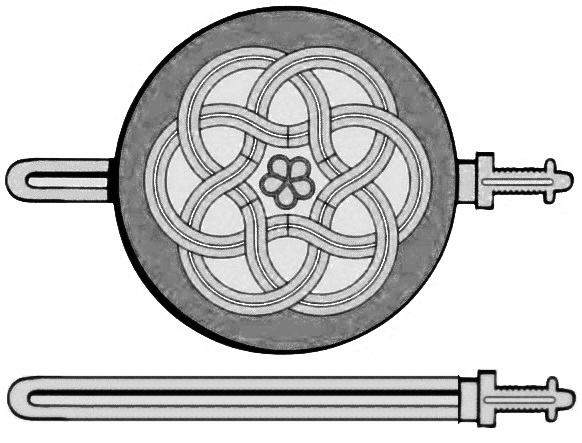
Zulfiqar with and without the shield. The Fatimid depiction of Ali's sword as carved on the Gates of the Old Cairo, Bab al-Nasr.

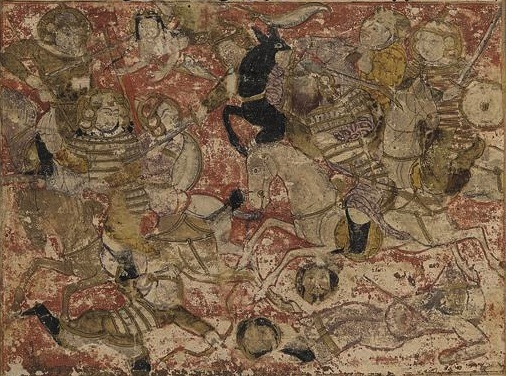
Combat between the forces of Ali and Mu'awiya during the Battle of Siffin, from Tarikhnama

Ali is regarded as an authority on the rules of intra-Muslim war in Islamic jurisprudence. He forbade Muslim fighters from looting, and instead equally distributed the taxes as salaries among his soldiers. This ruling probably became a subject of dispute between Ali and those who later formed the Kharijites. Before the Battle of the Camel (656), Ali also forbade chasing the fugitives, killing the prisoners, and dispatching the wounded. With these rulings, Ali thus recognized the rebels' rights as Muslims, even though they were considered a threat to order. Ali also pardoned them in victory, and these practices were soon enshrined in the Islamic law, for instance in the rulings of the prominent Sunni jurist Muhammad al-Shaybani (d. 805) about rebellions.

Beyond these measures, Ali has often been noted for his magnanimity to his defeated foes, preventing the enslavement of women and children in victory, even though some protested. He advised al-Ashtar not to reject any call to peace and not to violate any agreements, warned him against unlawful shedding of blood, urged him to resort to war only when negotiations failed, and to avoid commencing hostilities, which Ali himself observed. He forbade his commanders from disturbing the civilians except when lost or in dire need of food, and barred his troops from killing the wounded and those who flee, mutilating the dead, entering homes without permission, looting, and harming the women. Prior to the Battle of Siffin (657), Ali did not deprive the Syrians of drinking water, even though they had earlier done so to his troops. In the opinion of Kelsay, the texts attributed to Ali and his practices indicate that he saw reconciliation as the final aim of intra-Muslim warfare, in line with verses 49:9-10 of the Quran.

== Austerity ==
Ali lived an austere life, and strictly separated his public and private spending. Hassan Abbas writes that Ali had a simple diet and mended his own things. In a letter to Uthman ibn Hunayf attributed to Ali, the governor of Basra is admonished for accepting an invitation to a banquet, asking how he could go to bed with his belly full, while there were people around him who are hungry. Also ascribed to Ali is the saying, "God has made it incumbent on true leaders to make themselves commensurable with the weakest people over whom they rule, so that the poverty of the poor will not engender covetousness." When he relocated to Kufa, as the new de-facto capital, Ali refused to reside in the governor's castle, says Madelung, calling it qasr al-khabal (lit. 'castle of corruption'). Instead, he stayed with his nephew Ja'da ibn Hubayra, or in a small house next to the mosque. According to al-Ya'qubi (d. 897-8), "Ali never wore a new garment, never acquired a state, never set his heart on wealth, and used his assets for giving alms to the needy people." The view of Shah-Kazemi is that Ali respected private property rights but did not allow the rich to add to their wealth at the expense of the poor. To justify this policy, Shah-Kazemi cites verse 59:7, which warns Muslims about their wealth "circulating only among the rich."

== Minorities ==
Shah-Kazemi believes that Ali upheld the freedom of speech in his tolerance of the Kharijites as long as their protests remained peaceful. When some encouraged him to punish the Kharijites, Ali said that he would defend himself with his words as long they attacked him with words, with his hands if they attacked him with their hands, and with his sword only if they attacked him with their swords. A similar report is given by al-Shaybani, who also adds another report: Sawwar al-Manquri was brought to Ali for publicly cursing and threatening to kill him, Ali released the former. When the narrator apparently objected to this, Ali explained, "Shall I kill him even though he has not [yet] killed me?" The narrator then added that Sawwar had cursed the caliph, to which Ali replied that the former should then curse Sawwar or leave him alone. These reports set the precedent in Islamic law for a commensurate response to opposition, writes Kelsay. Unless the rebel party actually resorts to violence, the caliph must refrain from use of force. It is not even enough to know that the rebels intend to attack. There are indications that Ali considered the religious minorities (ahl al-dhimma) legally equal to Muslims, reputedly setting the same blood money for all citizens, regardless of their faith. For their tax (jizya), letters attributed to Ali forbade his officials from pressing the ahl al-dhimma for payments.

== Welfare state ==
Ali took some early measures toward the establishment of a welfare state. In his letter to al-Ashtar, he urged his commander to prioritize the needy, the afflicted, and the disabled, to assign a deputy to oversee their needs, and to attend to them personally. The Shia jurist Hossein Noori Hamedani cites an encounter between an old beggar and Ali, who reputedly gave the man a regular stipend from the treasury after reprimanding the man's neighbors, "You have employed him to the point where he is old and infirm, and now you refuse to help him."

== Praise ==
The Sunni scholar Ahmad ibn Hanbal (d. 855) famously said that Ali adorned the caliphate. Linda Jones holds the caliphate of Ali as a model for socio-political and religious righteousness that defies worldly corruption and social injustice. John Esposito has a similar view. Madelung writes that the caliphate of Ali was characterized by his honesty, his unbending devotion to Islam, his equal treatment of the supporters, and his magnanimity towards his defeated enemies. Moojan Momen and Veccia Vaglieri share similar opinions. The latter adds that Ali fought against those whom he perceived as erring Muslims as a matter of duty, in order to uphold Islam. Shah-Kazemi says that Ali strived for justice and compassion for all, regardless of their religion. Ismail Poonawala writes that the sources are unanimous about the devotion of Ali to the cause of Islam and the rule of justice in accordance with the Quran and the Sunnah. Muhammad al-Buraey views the instructions of Ali for his governor of Egypt as a model for just Islamic governance, "where justice and mercy is shown to human beings irrespective of class, creed and color, where poverty is neither a stigma or disqualification and where justice is not tarred with nepotism, favoritism, provincialism or religious fanaticism." A similar view is voiced by Shah-Kazemi.

== Popular accounts ==
There are popular accounts and anecdotes about the caliphate of Ali and his character, some of which are summarized below:

- Ibn Abi'l-Hadid (d. 1258) quotes Sa'sa'a ibn Suhan, a companion of Ali, as saying, "He [Ali] was among us as one of our own, of gentle disposition (lin janib), intense humility, leading with a light touch (suhulat qiyad), even though we were in awe of him with the kind of awe that a bound prisoner has before one who holds a sword over his head."
- Uthman ibn Hunayf warned Ali that the equal distribution of the state revenues would alienate Arab nobles, who might turn to Mu'awiya, while the poor, the disabled, the widows, and the slaves, who benefited from the new policy, would not bring Ali any political advantage. Ali is reported to have responded that he was happy about the deserters (implying that those who prioritized material gains did not belong to his camp). As for the poor, Ali said his aim was to serve them by upholding their rights rather than benefit from them politically.
- When Ali was visited by private guests one evening at work, he turned off the candle and lit another one. When asked about it, he explained that the first candle was paid for by public funds while the latter was his own.
- A sermon attributed to him in Nahj al-balagha mentions how Ali spared the life of Amr ibn al-As, the top enemy commander, when the latter exposed himself to Ali on the battlefield of Siffin in an attempt to save his life.

== See also ==
- First Fitna
- Kharijite Rebellions against Ali
