= Election of Uthman =

Appointment of the third Rashidun caliph

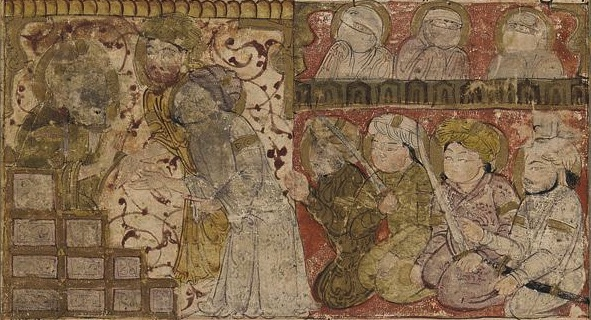
- The election of Uthman, from Balami's Tarikhnama
- Date: November 644
- Location: Medina, Rashidun Caliphate
- Participants: Uthman ibn Affan; Ali ibn Abi Talib; Abd al-Rahman ibn Awf; Sa'd ibn Abi Waqqas; Zubayr ibn al-Awwam; Talha ibn Ubaydallah
- Outcome: Uthman became caliph

The Election of Uthman was the appointment of Uthman ibn Affan as the third caliph by a committee (shura), which was assembled by the dying caliph Umar in 23 AH (643-4 CE). The committee likely consisted of six early Muslims from the Quraysh tribe, including the prophet Muhammad's second cousin and son-in-law Uthman and Muhammad's first cousin and son-in-law Ali ibn Abi Talib. The deciding vote was given to Uthman's Brother-in-law Abd al-Rahman ibn Awf, who appointed the former as the next caliph after the deliberations stalled. The choice of the wealthy Uthman is sometimes explained as an intention to guard the interests of the Quraysh and to follow the practices of the first two caliphs, namely, Abu Bakr and Umar. The committee has been criticized for its alleged bias towards Uthman and for its exclusion of the Ansar.

== Committee ==
The committee was convened in Medina by the second caliph Umar (r. 634–644) after he was stabbed in 23/644 by Abu Lu'lu'a Firuz, a Persian slave. On his deathbed, Umar tasked the committee with choosing the next caliph among themselves. This committee is also often referred to as a shura or electorate body by Sunni theologians. Early Sunni sources unanimously approve of Umar's committee, though they often regard it as the second-best solution because Umar reputedly did not know whom to appoint directly. For instance, the Sunni al-Tabari (d. 310/923) quotes Umar as saying that he would have designated his advisor Abu Ubayda ibn al-Jarrah or Salim ibn Ma'qil, the mawla of Abu Hudhayfa ibn Utba, both of whom predeceased the second caliph. Elsewhere, Umar would have selected Abu Ubayda, Mu'adh ibn Jabal, or Khalid ibn al-Walld, as reported in al-Imama wa al-siyasa and also by al-Tabari. Mahmoud M. Ayoub (d. 2021) suggests that Umar also did not want to be directly involved with this appointment, fearing dissension afterward. This fear is also noted by Husain M. Jafri (d. 2019).

=== Members ===
Umar nominated six men to this committee in most sources, all from the Muhajirun (early Meccan converts). The committee consisted of Muhammad's cousin and son-in-law Ali ibn Abi Talib, Muhammad's son-in-law Uthman ibn Affan, Uthman's brother-in-law and Umar's key advisor Abd al-Rahman ibn Awf, Ibn Awf's cousin Sa'd ibn Abi Waqqas, Ali's cousin Zubayr ibn al-Awwam, and Talha ibn Ubaydullah.

A few sources add to this list Sa'id ibn Zayd, a companion of Muhammad, while a report by al-Tabari says Ibn Zayd was excluded because of his kinship with Umar, who reputedly did not want hereditary succession. On the other hand, some sources do not include Sa'd in the committee. Most sources also say that Talha arrived in Medina after the committee had reached its final decision and was absent from the proceedings. Sa'd formally acted as his proxy by some accounts. The Sunni historian Ibn Sa'd (d. 168/784-5) and some other Sunni sources also list Umar's son Abd Allah in the capacity of an advisor to the committee. Alternatively, the Sunni al-Imama wa al-siyasa reports that Hasan ibn Ali served as a witness in the committee.

=== Configuration ===
Jafri believes that Umar did not consult the Muslim community before appointing this committee, while Patricia Crone (d. 2015) says that this matter is unclear in most sources except the Sunni al-Jahiz (d. 869), according to whom Umar chose the committee members with help from early Muslims. Early Sunni sources defend the configuration of the committee, quoting Umar as saying that these were the best or the most entitled to the caliphate or those over whom the community would split.

==== Uthman ====
The aging Uthman was a wealthy merchant from the powerful Banu Umayyad clan of the Quraysh. He nevertheless lacked leadership or military experience, unlike the rest of the committee. Not much is known about him during the reigns of Abu Bakr and Umar, and some have thus found it peculiar that Uthman was nominated. An early convert and Muhammad's son-in-law, Wilferd Madelung and Sean Anthony suggest that Umar nominated Uthman as the only available strong counter-candidate to Ali, the much younger figurehead of Muhammad's clan, the Banu Hashim. If Uthman had not been nominated, observes Madelung, the Umayyads would have inevitably supported their distant relative Ali in the committee. While all nominees belonged to the Quraysh, the rest were from obscure clans, unlike Ali and Uthman.

==== Umar's views ====
Umar is shown in early Sunni sources as concerned that the disagreements in the committee would split the community, and he reportedly warned Ali, Uthman, and possibly also Ibn Awf about favoring their kin if they are elected. On this basis, Madelung suggests that Umar considered these three as the serious contenders for the caliphate in the committee. Among these three, Madelung suggests that Ibn Awf and Ali were Umar's most and least preferred candidates, respectively. Alternatively, Jafri and Ayoub consider it likely that Umar saw Ali and Uthman as the strongest candidates. Umar also remarked elsewhere about the "foolishness" (du'aba) of Ali, but nevertheless considered him worthy of the caliphate and predicted the nepotism of Uthman. Madelung is confident that this Sunni account is fabricated, which is also what Ayoub suggests.

Some early reports indicate that Umar vocally opposed the combination of the prophethood and the caliphate in the Banu Hashim, and he thus prevented Muhammad from dictating his will on his deathbed, possibly fearing that he might expressly designate Ali as his successor. In this vein, Farhad Daftary believes that Ali was deliberately excluded from any position of importance during the caliphates of Umar and his predecessor, while Anthony regards Ali's disenfranchisement as self-imposed and a sign of his disapproval of the first two caliphs, even though he offered his (at times critical) advice to the caliphs. Considering all this, Jafri suggests that Umar nevertheless included Ali in the committee because of his high political standing, which made it impossible for Umar to exclude Ali. Ayoub extends this attitude of Umar to other government posts, basing his conclusion on a report by al-Mas'udi (d. 956) in which the caliph hesitated to install the Hashemite Ibn Abbas (d. c. 687) as the governor of Homs, saying that Muhammad had not given the Banu Hashim any share in the power.

=== Rules ===
The committee was reportedly threatened with death to reach an agreement in three days, possibly reflecting an anxiety to avoid civil unrest and discord, something that later became the anathema to Sunni Islam. Umar also stipulated some rules for the committee, who were to meet in closed caucus to prevent outside influence, according to some reports by al-Tabari. Other reports, including one by al-Tabari, indicate that the Meccan and Medinan leaders and the garrison commanders lobbied Ibn Awf. Another report by the Mu'tazilite Ibn Abi'l-Hadid (d. 1258) describes how Ibn Awf solicited advice from the public during the deliberations. The Ansari Abu Talha and his men were reportedly ordered by Umar to stand guard and enforce these rules:

- The new caliph must belong to the committee, elected by a majority of its members.
- In case of a tie, Ibn Awf would elect the next caliph. This might be plausible because Ibn Awf was Umar's closest advisor after the death of Abu Ubayda in 639, and belonged to a small clan of the Quraysh. Jafri, Momen, Ayoub, and Abbas favor this account. In other reports, Ibn Awf took himself out of the competition in return for being recognized as the arbitrator. Madelung, Crone, and Keshk prefer this account, while Keaney is undecided, commenting that Umar probably avoided stacking the committee so obviously against Ali. Jafri disagrees, citing Ali's own account of the proceedings in the Shia Nahj al-balagha, and adding that Umar meant to block Ali but could have not simply excluded him from the proceedings. A report by al-Tabari reads that Ali objected to Ibn Awf's deciding vote to no avail. Alternatively, some sources give the arbitration role to Umar's son, Abd Allah.
- Those members who would not endorse the final decision (or those who would oppose Ibn Awf's pick in case of a tie) were to be slain.

=== Criticism ===
==== Ansar ====
The Ansar (early Medinan converts) were absent from this committee, either because of their pro-Ali sympathies at the Saqifa after Muhammad's death in 632, as suggested by Jafri and Abbas, or to keep the caliphate within the Quraysh, as implied by others. Whatever the reason, the absence of the Ansar is believed to have helped Uthman defeat Ali. Some contemporary authors have criticized Umar's exclusion of the Ansar and others from decision making.

==== Voting bloc ====
Sa'd was inclined to support his cousin Ibn Awf, who was in turn likely to align himself with his brother-in-law, Uthman. This voting bloc of three would have formed the majority within the committee if Talha was absent and Sa'd thus cast two votes. Ibn Awf was given the tie-breaker and this voting bloc would have therefore dictated the outcome even if Talha was present during the deliberations. That the arrangement of the committee blocked the chances of Ali is also the view of Ayoub, who adds that Umar might have done so unknowingly. Jafri disagrees, saying that Umar meant to block Ali but could have not simply excluded him from the proceedings.

==== Ali's grievances ====
Possibly with the same calculations, Ali is shown as reluctant in the version of the events in which Ibn Awf proposed to cast the deciding vote in return for giving up his claims to the caliphate. Ali later referred to this voting bloc, complaining that the committee was stacked against him, as reported by the Sunni al-Baladhuri (d. 892) and al-Tabari, among others, and also in the Shia Nahj al-balagha. Jafri suggests that Umar deliberately blocked the chances of Ali by granting the chairmanship of the committee to Ibn Awf, possibly fearing discord and civil unrest. In Jafri's view, the inclusion of Ali in the committee simultaneously recognized his claims, blocked his chances, and removed his freedom to independently seek the caliphate. The last item is a reference to an exchange to this effect between Ali and Muhammad's uncle Abbas, reported by al-Baladhuri and al-Tabari.

===== Coercion =====
Perhaps aware of his minority position within the committee, a reluctant Ali was compelled to participate in the committee, threatened by fear of arms, according to some reports by al-Baladhuri and al-Tabari. Alternatively, Ayoub surmises that Ali participated in the committee to save the community from dissension, even though he was aware that the committee was biased towards Uthman. When asked why he accepted the offer by al-Ma'mun (r. 813–833) to be his heir apparent, the Shia Imam Ali al-Rida (d. 818) is reported to have responded, "The same thing which forced my grandfather the Commander of the Faithful [Ali] to join the arbitration council [assembled by Umar]." This "same thing" might have been coercion based on another statement by al-Rida, "I was also forced to accept (the succession to the throne) even though I did not like to. I unwillingly accepted it when I was about to be killed," as reported in the Shia source Uyun akhbar al-Rida.

== Deliberations ==
The candidates could not reach an agreement and the decision was soon in the hands of Ibn Awf, who had the deciding vote, and ultimately played a key role in the accession of his brother-in-law, Uthman. A report by al-Tabari reads that Ali initially objected to this arrangement but relented when Ibn Awf swore to be impartial. Ibn Awf then reportedly asked each candidate privately whom they would vote for if they were out of the race. In that case, Uthman said he would support Ali, while Ali, Sa'd, and Zubayr supported Uthman. Keaney finds it odd that Ali supported Uthman in this report, noting that the former thought the committee was stacked against him. Some reports by al-Tabari suggest that Sa'd and Zubayr did not press their own or Talha's claims and thus the choice soon narrowed down to Uthman and Ali. Alternatively, Ibn Ishaq (d. 150/767) and al-Tabari include reports in which Talha was present and withdrew in favor of Uthman, Zubayr for Ali, and Sa'd for Ibn Awf. This account evidently contradicts the version in which Ibn Awf has the deciding vote.

=== Ali ===
By some accounts, Ali successfully appealed to Zubayr and Sa'd, and the two reportedly changed sides to Ali, but this would have given Ali the majority if Talha was still away and Sa'd thus had two votes. Madelung mentions this account about Sa'd but calls it "soft support at best," suggesting that "Ali had virtually no support" in the committee. Madelung and Jafri also believe that Zubayr supported Uthman, even though the former had earlier advocated for Ali against Abu Bakr after Muhammad's death. Despite his family ties with Ali, Jafri suggests, Zubayr this time withheld his support from the pious Ali with an eye on the financial opportunities that had opened up after the conquests of the Byzantine and Persian empires. He observes that Zubayr, Talha, Sa'd, and Ibn Awf all accumulated tremendous wealth under Uthman.

=== External influence ===
Ibn Awf also consulted the notable figures from Mecca, Medina, and the garrison towns, who were present in Medina. In particular, the Quraysh elite strongly supported Uthman, writes Madelung. The Makhzumite leader Abd Allah ibn Abi Rabi'a of the Quraysh reportedly warned Ibn Awf, "If you pledge allegiance to Ali, we shall hear and disobey, but if you pledge allegiance to Uthman, we shall hear and obey. So fear God, Ibn Awf." Ali was vocal about the divine and exclusive right of Muhammad's descendants to leadership, which would have jeopardized the future ambitions of other Qurayshites for leadership.

== Decision ==
Following the instructions of Umar, Ibn Awf spent three days after Umar's passing engaged in prayer, supplication, and seeking divine guidance (Istikhara), while also consulting with men of wisdom to select the next Caliph. The most common tradition here is that Ibn Awf publicly offered the caliphate to Ali on two conditions: First, he should follow the Quran and the Sunna (Muhammad's precedent), and second, he should follow the example of the first two caliphs, namely, Abu Bakr and Umar. Ali accepted the first condition but declined the second one, adding that he would rely only on his judgment in the absence of any precedent from the Quran and the Sunna. Ibn Awf then presented the same conditions to Uthman who readily accepted them. This is also the version preferred by Mavani, Kennedy, Afsaruddin, Shaban, Shah-Kazemi, and Aslan. Alternatively, Crone and Keaney present another (Sunni) version in which Ali replies that he would follow Abu Bakr and Umar to the best of his ability, whereas Uthman simply answered affirmatively and received the mandate from Ibn Awf. This second account suggests a clear preference for Uthman by Ibn Awf.

At any rate, Ibn Awf then pledged his allegiance to Uthman as the next caliph and everyone else reportedly followed suit. Even though Ali did not seriously challenged it, the appointment of Uthman was not received well by some quarters of the Muslim community and likely contributed toward the first civil war (fitna). Uthman's reign as the third caliph was widely accused with nepotism and departure from Islamic piety. He was assassinated by discontented rebels in his residence in 656.

=== Reaction of Ali ===
Ali opposed the decision of the committee, and objected to what he viewed as Ibn Awf's partiality, but reportedly did not challenge the outcome. There are contradictory Sunni accounts about the reaction of Ali to the appointment of Uthman though they all end with his pledge to the new caliph. The ninth-century sources of Keaney are thus willing to include the disagreements between the companions but present them and the community united behind the new caliph in the end. As the reverence for companions gradually became a Sunni dogma, such reports were later dismissed as pro-Alid and largely censored by Sunni authors, even though the authors of these accounts reject the Shia claims and support their Abbasid caliphs.

The Shia Nahj al-balagha reports that Ali agreed to go along with the committee's decision "so long as the affairs of [the] Muslims remain intact and there is no oppression in it save on myself." Reza Shah-Kazemi interprets this statement as Ali's tacit approval of the rules of Abu Bakr and Umar, adding that he nevertheless viewed himself as the rightful successor to Muhammad, and gave up his claims to the caliphate for the unity of Islam. In contrast, Hamid Mavani and Maria M. Dakake suggest that Ali viewed the succession of Abu Bakr as a digression which turned into a full-blown deviation with the rebellion of Mu'awiya during his own caliphate. This is also the Shia view, as represented by the Shia jurist Ruhollah Khomeini (d. 1989). Ali's refusal to follow the precedent of the first two caliphs also became the hallmark of Shia jurisprudence and led to the later development of their independent schools of law.

=== Status quo ===
Laura Veccia Vaglieri (d. 1989) suggests that the caliphate of Ali would have endangered certain well-established interests because he did not view Abu Bakr and Umar as entirely aligned with the Quran and the Sunna. Aslan has a similar opinion, while McHugo adds that Ali would have opened the leadership to the Ansar and others, thus ending the privileged status of the Quraysh. Along these lines, Anthony views Ali's refusal to follow the first two caliphs as evidence of his censure of their rule. Shaban notes that Ali's refusal made him a rallying point for the opposition movement, adding that the wealthy Uthman was possibly selected to guard the Meccan interests. Likewise, Kennedy suggests that Ali refused to follow the precedent of Abu Bakr and Umar because he might have realized that the Quraysh's domination was dividing the community and wished to open the leadership for other groups, especially the Ansar, with whom he had links. Uthman, in contrast, was a wealthy Meccan merchant with good ties with the Quraysh elite. Some contemporary authors go further, suggesting that Ibn Awf's question was designed to weed out Ali, as he was well aware of Ali's disagreements with the past two caliphs and that he would have inevitably rejected the second condition. For Afsaruddin, however, the (Sunni) accounts of Uthman's appointment convey that the third caliph was expected at the time to follow Abu Bakr and Umar.

=== Motivations of Ibn Awf ===
According to Jafri, Uthman is often portrayed as a weak-minded man, and he suggests that Ibn Awf and the committee (except Ali) hoped that he would serve their interests, as representatives of the Quraysh aristocracy. Keaney and Ayoub include a report by al-Tabari that quotes Ali as saying, "You [Ibn Awf] have appointed Uthman so that the rule will come back to you." The view of Wellhausen is similar. Still, Madelung disagrees with it, saying that Uthman was actually put forward because he was the only available strong counter-candidate to Ali. His view is echoed by McHugo.

== Historicity ==
The earliest sources are akhbari accounts written more than a century after Uthman, all of which are polemical, written also with the benefit of hindsight. That is, the authors knew about Uthman's nepotism, Ali's caliphate, the civil war, and the Umayyad and the Abbasid dynasties. Cateani (d. 1935) thus rejects Umar's committee altogether as a later fabrication to justify the prevailing practice of the Abbasids, whereas Jafri, Madelung, and Keaney defend the credibility of the accounts in this regard.

Jafri further argues that the accounts of Umar's committee are essentially authentic, adding that the accounts of the early historians al-Baladhuri, al-Ya'qubi (d. 284/897-8), al-Tabari, and al-Mas'udi are similar to each other and to that of the much earlier Ibn Ishaq (d. 150/767). Nevertheless, he admits that it is difficult to ascertain the committee's deliberations. Alternatively, Madelung believes that the related historical accounts are partly contradictory and fictional, though he contends that some conclusions can be made from them with reasonable certainty.

== See also ==
- Caliph
- Succession to Muhammad
- Islamic democracy
