= Ghurar al-hikam =

Collection of aphorisms

Ghurar al-ḥikam wa durar al-kalim (Arabic: غرر الحکم و درر الکلم, lit. 'exalted aphorisms and pearls of speech') is a large collection of aphorisms attributed to Ali ibn Abi Talib (d. 661), the fourth Rashidun caliph (r. 656–661), the first Shia imam, and the cousin and son-in-law of the Islamic prophet Muhammad. This work was compiled by the Muslim scholar Abd al-Wahid al-Amidi (d. 1116).

== Compiler ==
Ghurar al-hikam was compiled by Abd al-Wahid al-Amidi (d. 1116), who has been described as either a Shafi'i jurist or a Twelver Shia scholar. He was a student of the Sufi scholar Ahmad al-Ghazali (d. 1123), and a teacher to Ibn Shahrashub (d. 1192), a prominent Twelver scholar.

== Contents ==
Ghurar al-hikam is a collection of over ten thousand pietistic and ethical sayings attributed to Ali, taken from various sources, including Nahj al-balagha by the Twelver theologian Sharif al-Radi (d. 1015), Mi'a kalema (lit. 'hundred sayings [of Ali]') by the Abbasid-era scholar al-Jahiz (d. 869), Tuhuf al-uqul by the Shia traditionist Ibn Shu'ba al-Harrani, and Dustur ma'alim al-hikam by the Shafi'i jurist al-Quda'i (d. 1062). The oldest extant manuscript of Ghurar al-hikam dates to 1123 CE. The aphorisms in Ghurar al-hikam and other works attributed to Ali are said to have exerted considerable influence on the Islamic mysticism throughout its history.

== Passages ==
- Consider not who said [it], rather, look at what he said.
- If your aspiration ascends to the reforming of the people, [then] begin with yourself, for your pursuit of the reform of others, when your own soul is corrupt, is the greatest of faults.
- Action–all action–is dust, except what is purified [accomplished sincerely] within it.
- Make purely (akhlis) for God your action and your knowledge, your love and your hatred, your talking and your leaving, your speech and your silence.
- Action without knowledge is error.
- The invocation [of God] is not a formality of speech nor a way of thinking; rather, it comes forth firstly from the Invoked [i.e., God], and secondly from the invoker (awwal min al-madhkur wa th'anin min al-dh'akir).
- Where are they whose actions are accomplished purely for God, and who purify their hearts [so that they become] places for the remembrance of God?
- Do not remember God absent-mindedly (s'ahiyan), nor forget Him in distraction; rather, remember Him with perfect remembrance (dhikran k'amilan), a remembrance in which your heart and tongue are in harmony, and what you conceal conforms with what you reveal. But you will not remember Him according to the true reality of the remembrance (haqiqat al-dhikr) until you forget your own soul in your remembrance.
- Perpetuate the dhikr, for truly it illuminates the heart, and it is the most excellent form of worship.
- He who loves a thing dedicates himself fervently to its invocation.
- Whoever invokes God, glorified be He, God enlivens his heart and illuminates his inner substance (lubb).
- He who knows his soul fights it.
- The ultimate battle is that of a man against his own ego.
- The strongest people are those who are strongest against their own egos.
- Struggling against the ego through knowledge—such is the mark of the intellect.

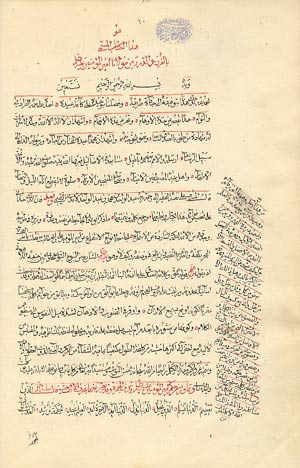
Folio from an old manuscript of Ghurar al-hikam

- The dispensing of mercy brings down [divine] mercy.
- As you grant mercy, so will you be granted mercy.
- I am astounded by the person who hopes for mercy from one above him, while he is not merciful to those beneath him.
- [Divine] knowledge calls out for action; if it is answered [it is of avail], otherwise it departs.
- He attains deliverance whose intellect dominates his caprice.
- The intellect (al-aql) and passion (al-hawa) are opposites. The intellect is strengthened by knowledge, passion by caprice. The soul (al-nafs) is between them, pulled by both. Whichever triumphs has the soul on its side.
- He who knows God integrates himself (tawahhad). He who knows his soul disengages himself (tajarrad). He who knows people isolates himself (tafarrad). He who knows the world withholds himself (tazahhad).
- Acquire [divine] knowledge, and [true] life will acquire you.
- The prophet of a man is the interpreter of his intellect (rasul al-rajul tarjuman aqlihi).
- There is no religion for one who has no intellect.
- Learning and reflecting upon knowledge is the delight of the knowers.
- The excellence of the intellect is in the beauty of things outward and inward (jama'l al-zawahir wa'l-bawatin).

== See also ==
- Nahj al-balagha
- Al-Sahifa al-sajjadiyya
- List of Shia books
- The pious sermon
- Sermon al-Ashbah
