= Sermon al-Ashbah =

The Sermon al-Ashbah is a sermon delivered by Ali ibn Abi Talib in response to a person's request to describe the essence and attributes of God.

== Why it is called al-Ashbah ==
Several explanations have been given for why this sermon is called al-Ashbah. Some of them are:

1: Some scholars suggest that Ashbah refers to angels, as a significant part of the sermon discusses angels, which led to it being called the Ashbah Sermon.

2: Another explanation is that Ashbah is the plural of shabah, meaning skeleton. Since the sermon describes angels and other kinds of beings, it was given the name al-Ashbah.

3: Makarem Shirazi suggests that the word Ashbah may have been part of the original sermon. He says that Sayyid al-Radi may have left out this part because he often included only parts of sermons in Nahj al-Balagha. Makarem suggests that the missing sentence may have been: “How can He be described by bodies, and how can eloquent tongues describe Him?” Shaykh al-Saduq included this sentence in his book Tawhid, in a sermon that is similar to part of the Sermon of al-Ashbah.

4:Makarem Shirazi gives another possible explanation: the sermon may have been called al-Ashbah because it was long. One of the meanings of shabaḥ is length.

== Reason for the Sermon ==
Mas‘adah ibn Ṣadaqah related from Ja‘far ibn Muhammad that one day a man came to Ali and said, “O Commander of the Faithful, describe our Lord to us in such a way that we may imagine seeing Him with our own eyes, so that our love and knowledge of Him may increase.” Ali became angry at this request and called the people to gather in the mosque of Kufa. So many people gathered that the mosque became crowded. Then Ali went to the pulpit while he was still angry and his face had changed color. He praised and thanked God, sent blessings upon the Prophet, and began the sermon.

After this, Makarem Shirazi suggests other possible reasons for Ali's anger. According to him, the way the question was asked showed that the person expected God to have qualities like those of created beings, because he had spoken about seeing God with the eyes. Makarem connects this view to the belief of the Mujassima, a group that believed God had a body. He also suggests that Ali may have been angry because, even though many years had passed since the beginning of Islam and religious teachings had spread, some Muslims still did not have a clear understanding of God's qualities. Another possibility is that Ali was saddened by the 25 years he had stayed away from public life and had been unable to teach people and help them understand religious teachings.

== Structure of the Sermon ==
Ali ibn Abi Talib discusses ten points in the sermon:

1. Describing the qualities of God, including His generosity, providing sustenance, being the First and the Last, and not being seen.
2. Answering the question about God's attributes and explaining that people should only learn about God from what the Qur’an says.
3. The inability of human reason and thought to understand God's nature and greatness.
4. The creation of beings and the signs of God's power and wisdom in creation.
5. The order and perfection of creation and how God guides and manages His creation.
6. The creation and description of the sky, the sun, the moon, and the stars.
7. The creation of angels and their qualities, characteristics, and worship.
8. The creation of the earth, mountains, water, clouds, rain, and plants.
9. The creation of Adam, his coming down to earth, the sending of prophets, and God's knowledge of what is open and hidden.
10. Prayer, praising God, and asking for His mercy, forgiveness, and freedom from needing others.

== Part of the sermon ==
Ali ibn Abi Talib says in part of this sermon:

عَالِمُ السِّرِّ مِنْ ضَمَائِرِ الْمُضْمِرِینَ وَ نَجْوَی الْمُتَخَافِتِینَ وَ خَوَاطِرِ رَجْمِ الظُّنُونِ وَ عُقَدِ عَزِیمَاتِ الْیَقِینِ وَ مَسَارِقِ إِیمَاضِ الْجُفُونِ وَ مَا ضَمِنَتْهُ أَکْنَانُ الْقُلُوبِ وَ غَیَابَاتُ الْغُیُوبِ وَ مَا أَصْغَتْ لِاسْتِرَاقِهِ مَصَائِخُ الْأَسْمَاعِ وَ مَصَایِفُ الذَّرِّ وَ مَشَاتِی الْهَوَامِّ وَ رَجْعِ الْحَنِینِ مِنَ الْمُولَهَاتِ وَ هَمْسِ الْأَقْدَامِ ...

God knows the hidden secrets of people, their quiet whispers, what comes to their minds through thoughts and guesses, the decisions they make with certainty, and the secret glances that pass through their eyelids. God knows what is hidden in people's hearts and what is hidden behind the veil of the unseen. He knows what the ears secretly hear, the inside of ants’ summer nests, the winter homes of insects, the sad cries of grieving women, and the quiet sound of footsteps ...

== Significance of the Sermon ==
The Sermon of Ashbah is regarded as one of the most beautiful sermons in Nahj al-Balagha. Ibn Abi al-Hadid considered it one of the most eloquent and profound sermons, and possibly the most beautiful sermon in the book. The Sermon of Ashbah has also been studied for its linguistic and literary style, including the relationship between its words, sounds, sentence structure, and meaning.

== See also ==
- Nahj al-Balagha
- Shaqshaqiya sermon
- The pious sermon
- Ali ibn Abi Talib
- Islamic ethics
- List of Shia books
- The Sermon of al-Gharra
