= Shaqshaqiya sermon =

Sermon attributed to Ali

The Shaqshiqiyya sermon (Arabic: اَلْخُطْبَةُ اَلشِّقْشِقِيَّةُ, lit. 'roar of the camel') is a text in Nahj al-balagha, the collection of sermons, letters, and sayings of Ali, the cousin and son-in-law of the Islamic prophet Muhammad, the first Shia Imam and the fourth Rashidun caliph. The sermon is highly critical of Abu Bakr, Umar, and Uthman, accusing them of usurping Ali's rightful succession to the prophet.

The sermon also appears in some sources that predate Nahj al-balagha, and a number of Shia authorities have furnished it with multiple chains of transmission, while other Shia scholars accept its authenticity without labeling it as mutawatir, which is the highest level of credibility in the hadith terminology.

== Background ==
=== Saqifa ===
Immediately after the death of the Islamic prophet Muhammad in 632 CE, a group of the Ansar (Medinan Muslims) met at the Saqifa and elected as his successor Abu Bakr, who was a senior companion of the prophet and his father-in-law. The accession of Abu Bakr was met with little resistance in Medina, even though the majority of the Muhajirun (Meccan Muslims) were not present at the Saqifa.

=== Opposition to the Saqifa ===
Also absent from the Saqifa were Muhammad's clan, the Banu Hashim. They and some companions of Muhammad gathered in protest in the residence of his cousin and son-in-law Ali ibn Abi Talib, whom they considered as the rightful successor of Muhammad. This soon led to a violent confrontation with Abu Bakr. According to the Shia, later also followed a violent raid on Ali's house in which his pregnant wife Fatima was badly injured and subsequently miscarried. Most likely, Ali did not pledge his allegiance to Abu Bakr until Fatima died within six months of her father Muhammad.

=== Political views of Ali ===
In contrast with the lifetime of Muhammad, Ali did not play any significant public role during the caliphates of Abu Bakr (r. 632–634) and his successors, namely, Umar (r. 634–644), and Uthman (r. 644–656), That there were disagreements between Ali and the first two caliphs in this period is well-documented, though they are largely downplayed or ignored in Sunni sources. By contrast, these conflicts are often emphasized in Shia sources. Their differences were epitomized during the proceedings of the council convened by Umar to elect his successor in 644, where Ali refused to be bound by the precedence of the first two caliphs. In Shia sources, Ali views the succession of Abu Bakr as a digression which paved the way for a full-blown deviation with the rebellion of Mu'awiya during his own caliphate. By contrast, he mounts only a passing resistance to the caliphate of Abu Bakr (if any at all) in often apologetic Sunni reports. Ali was also highly critical of the conduct of Uthman, and he was joined in this criticism by most senior companions. The controversial policies of Uthman eventually led to a rebellion and his assassination in 656, after which Ali was elected caliph by the Medinans and the dissidents present there.

=== Legitimism ===
Some experts report that Ali shows no inclination to legitimism in Sunni sources, while others point to Shia and some Sunni evidence that Ali considered the caliphate to be his right after Muhammad by virtue of his merits and his kinship with the prophet. There is some evidence that Ali further considered himself as the designated successor of Muhammad, probably a reference to Muhammad's announcement at the Ghadir Khumm. Soon after his death, however, it became clear that Ali did not enjoy popular support, which is perhaps why he resigned himself to the caliphate of Abu Bakr, likely for the sake of the unity of a nascent Islam.

== Authenticity ==
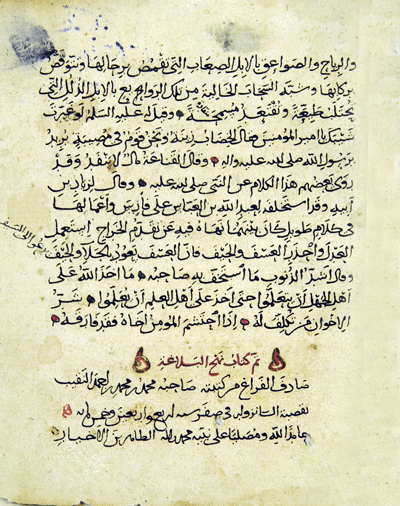
Folio from an old Nahj al-balagha

In view of its sometimes sensitive content, the authenticity of Nahj al-balagha has long been a subject of polemic debates, though recent academic research suggests that most of its contents can indeed be attributed to Ali by tracking the texts in sources that predate its compiler Sharif al-Radi (d. 1015). As for the Shaqshaqiya sermon, Sunni sources reject it as the work of al-Radi, himself a prominent Shia scholar. Their verdict is in line with the Sunni tendency to neutralize the conflicts among the companions after the death of Muhammad. By contrast, among other Shia scholars, the traditionist Abdul Hosein Amini (d. 1970) provided several chains of transmission for this sermon, some of which predate al-Radi. Other Shia authorities accept the authenticity of the Shaqshaqiya sermon but do not claim tawatur, which is the highest level of credibility in hadith terminology. Among this last group is the Shia philosopher al-Bahrani (d. 1299), who also authored a commentary on Nahj al-balagha. This lack of tawatur leaves the possibility that some sensitive words in the sermon were not uttered by Ali, according to the Islamic author Reza Shah-Kazemi. Alternatively, the Islamicist Husain M. Jafri (d. 2019) suggests that the sermon is authentic for it was also quoted in works that predate Nahj al-balagha, including Kitab al-Mahasin by the Shia traditionist Ahmad ibn Muhammad al-Ash'ari (d. 887), Kitab al-Gharat by the Shia historian Ibrahim ibn Muhammad al-Thaqafi (d. 896), and Kitab al-Insaf by the Mu'tazilite theologian Abu al-Qasim al-Balkhi (d. 1108).

== Content ==
Nay, by God, the son of Abi Quhafa [Abu Bakr] had exacted the caliphate for himself while he knew full well that my position in it was like that of the pivot in a mill; the flood waters flow down beneath me and the birds do not soar high up to me; yet I hung up a curtain before it and turned aside from it [the caliphate]. I then started thinking whether I should attack with a severing hand or should watch patiently the blind darkness in which the old man becomes decrepit and the young man old, in which the believer tries his utmost till he meets his Lord, and I came to the conclusion that patience in a situation like this was wiser.
So I adopted patience, although there was a mote rankling in my eye and a bone sticking in my throat on seeing my heritage being plundered, till the first one [Abu Bakr] died and handed over the reins of the caliphate to another person [Umar] after him. [Here Ali quotes a verse from the poet A'sha, which reads] "How vast is the difference between this day of mine when I am on the back of the camel [i.e. suffering from the hardship of a rough journey] and the day of Hayyan, brother of Jabir [ie. when he was comfortably placed under the power and prestige of Hayyan]." How hard did they [Abi Bakr and Umar] squeeze its udders and how they made it [the caliphate] travel on a rugged path, which inflicts deep wounds and is rough to the touch, in which one stumbles frequently and has to offer excuses, so that its rider is like the rider of a difficult mount: if he draws its reins tight, its nose is pierced, and if he relaxes it, he plunges into destruction. And so the people were afflicted, by God, with stumbling, refractoriness, capriciousness, and cross-purposes. But I kept patience in spite of the length of time and the severity of the ordeal, until he [Umar] went his way.

— A passage from the Shaqshaqiya sermon

== See also ==
- Nahj al-balagha
- The pious sermon
- Sermon al-Ashbah
- The Sermon of al-Gharra
