= Ali's letter to Malik al-Ashtar =

Medieval Arabic text

Ali's letter to Malik al-Ashtar refers to a set of instructions and advice addressed to Malik al-Ashtar, the military commander and an ardent supporter of Ali, the cousin and son-in-law of the Islamic prophet Muhammad, the first Shia Imam and the fourth Rashidun caliph. The letter outlines his conception of just and righteous governance, following the appointment of al-Ashtar as the new governor of Egypt circa 657 CE.

Among the earliest extant records about Islamic rule, the letter has received considerable attention throughout the Muslim history as a blueprint for Islamic governance. The theme of the letter can be summarized as justice and compassion for all, regardless of class, creed, and color. Malik was killed en route to Egypt to assume his new post at the instigation of Mu'awiya, the archenemy of Ali.

== Background ==
The controversial policies of the third caliph Uthman resulted in a rebellion that led to his assassination in Medina in 656 CE. Ali ibn Abi Talib, the son-in-law and cousin of the Islamic prophet Muhammad, was subsequently elected caliph by the Medinans and the dissidents present there. While he received a nearly unanimous pledge of allegiance in Medina, Ali found limited support among the powerful Quraysh tribe. Among the Quraysh, the caliphate of Ali was soon challenged by Aisha, a widow of Muhammad, and two of his companions, namely, Talha and Zubayr. Uthman's cousin Mu'awiya also denounced the accession of Ali when he was dismissed from his post as the governor of Syria. He now demanded retribution against Uthman's killers.

Ali defeated the rebellion of Aisha, Talha, and Zubayr in the Battle of the Camel in 656, but the Battle of Siffin against Mu'awiya in 657 resulted in a stalemate when the latter called for arbitration by the Quran to avoid defeat. Soon after Siffin, pro-Uthman and pro-Mu'awiya rebels in Egypt defeated the forces of Muhammad ibn Abi Bakr, the governor of Ali in Egypt at the time. Apparently concerned about his youth and inexperience, Ali sent his commander Malik al-Ashtar to replace Muhammad. However, Malik was poisoned and killed at the instigation of Mu'awiya en route to Egypt in 657, or in 658 or 659. Muhammad was also killed later and Egypt fell in 658 to a large army dispatched by Mu'awiya under the command of Amr ibn al-As.

== Contents ==
The letter reputedly contains some instructions for Malik al-Ashtar issued by Ali, outlining his vision of just and righteous governance. Among the earliest extant records about Islamic rule, the letter is the longest of its kind in Nahj al-balagha, an eleventh-century collection of sermons, letters, and sayings attributed to Ali. The letter has received considerable attention, serving as a blueprint for Islamic governance and complementing the general guidelines enshrined in the Constitution of Medina, attributed to Muhammad.

The theme of the letter can be summarized as justice and compassion for all, regardless of class, creed, and color. The letter opens with an emotional exhortation to Malik to fear God and strictly abide by all divine commands, perhaps as an antidote to the maxim, 'power corrupts'. In the letter, the ruler's obligation to God (ahd) thus transcends and subsumes his duty to the society. The ethos of humility is then stressed in the letter by presenting pride (takabbur) as a war with God. The letter urges Malik to view his rule as a means of encouraging religious awakening and spiritual well-being within the community.

Then there are instructions concerning the specific classes within the society, namely, the army, the scribes, the judiciary, executive officers, tax-collectors, peasants, merchants, artisans, and the destitute. Malik is advised to be a role model for his staff and others, to strive for justice and monitor his staff for its enforcement, and to consult often with his staff. The letter directs Malik to recruit only those known for their trustworthiness and to be wary of others' (often hidden) true nature. Merchants and craftsmen are praised therein for their benefits to the community but Malik is also asked to curb their vices, namely, hoarding, miserliness, and cheating. The destitute are described as those in the greatest need of compassionate justice, and the ruler is warned of divine wrath for neglecting them. To fulfil all these responsibilities, the letter prescribes endless remembrance of God and long hours of worship at nights.

== Authenticity ==
The letter can also be found in some sources that pre-date Nahj al-balagha, and it has been furnished with multiple chains of transmission from the first transmitter of the letter, Asbagh ibn Nubata, who is considered trustworthy in Shia hadith studies, to Sharif al-Radi (d. 1015), the prominent Shia scholar credited with compiling Nahj al-balagha. Another recension of the text exists in Da'a'im al-Islam, the legal compendium authored by the Isma'ili jurist al-Qadi al-Nu'man (d. 974), who attributes his version to Ali or Muhammad, though the latter attribution can be easily ruled out. There are some textual differences between the two versions. For instance, the name of Malik does not appear in the second version. The Islamicist Wadad al-Qadi rejects the attribution of both versions to Ali, while Reza Shah-Kazemi, another Islamic author, criticizes her for ignoring the Twelver evidence for attribution of the text to Ali. Such debates about the authenticity of this text and others attributed to Ali may nevertheless be irrelevant to their value as a source of spiritual and ethical teachings.

== Passages ==
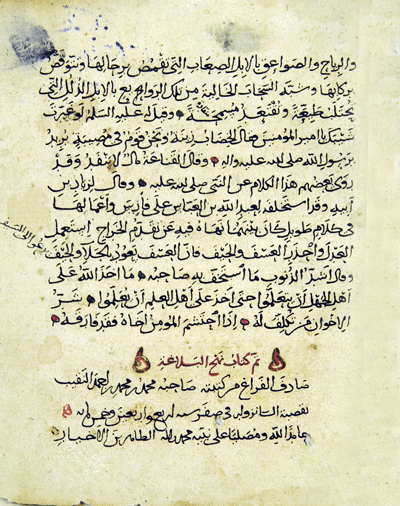
Folio from an old Nahj al-balagha

- Infuse your heart with mercy for the subjects, love for them, and kindness towards them. Be not like a ravenous beast of prey above them, seeking to devour them. For they are of two types: either your brother in religion or one like you in creation.
- Appoint as the commander of your soldiers the person whom you feel deeply is the most sincere in relation to God, the prophet, and your imam, the purest of heart, the one most excellent in forbearance (hilm); who is slow to anger, happy to pardon, kind to the weak, severe with the strong; one who is neither moved by violence nor held back by weakness. Cleave to those of noble descent, belonging to pious families of established name and repute, and to men known for their bravery, courage, generosity, and tolerance.
- Truly, miserliness, cowardice, and avarice are so many diverse inclinations comprised within a bad opinion of God.
- Never reject any call to peace made to you by your enemy... If you and your enemy enter into a solemn agreement, or if he obtains from you the right of protection [dhimma], then faithfully abide by what you have promised, and honorably uphold your obligation of protection.
- Let your concern with the cultivation of the land outweigh your concern with the collection of the tax, for no tax will be collected if there be no cultivation.
- The devastation of the land only comes about through the destitution of its inhabitants, and the destitution of its inhabitants only comes about when the desire to amass wealth controls the souls of the governors, when they have doubts about what endures, and when they profit little from exemplary teachings.
- Then–O God, O God!–[pay particular attention to] the lowest class, those who have no wherewithal, the destitute, the needy, the afflicted, the disabled. Within this class are those who beg, and those whose state of poverty calls out for relief, but they do not beg. Be mindful of God in regard to their rights, for He has entrusted these rights to your care. Assign to them a portion from your public funds, and a portion of the produce of what is taken as booty by the Muslims in every region; for those who are furthest have the same rights as those nearest.
- Apportion a part of your time to those who have special needs, making yourself free to attend to them personally, sitting with them in a public assembly with all due humility before God, your Creator.
- Dominate the zeal of your pride, the vehemence of your castigation, the power of your hand, and the sharpness of your tongue. Guard against these vices by restraining all impulsiveness, and putting off all resort to force until your anger subsides and you regain self-control. But you cannot attain such self-domination without increasing your preoccupation with the remembrance of your return to your Lord.
- Give to God your vital energy in your nights and your days, and perform fully that by which you draw near to Him, doing so perfectly, without becoming dull or deficient, taking your body to its limits.
- This [burden] is onerous for the governors, and [the fulfillment of all rights] is onerous, but God makes it [i.e., this burden of responsibility] light for those who aspire to the hereafter, who restrain their souls in patience, and trust in the truth of that which is promised to them by God.

== See also ==
- Nahj al-balagha
- List of Shia books
- The pious sermon
