= Nahj al-balagha =

Collection of Islamic sayings

Nahj al-Balagha
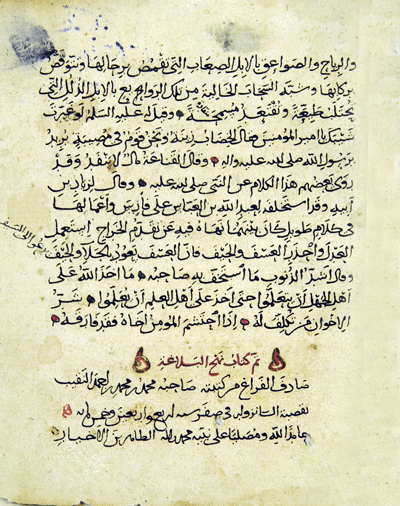
- A handwritten folio from Nahj al-Balagha, dated 1149 AD.
- Editor: Sharif al-Radi
- Language: Arabic
- Published: 10th century

Nahj al-Balagha (Arabic: نهج البلاغة, romanized: Nahj al-Balāgha, lit. 'Peak of Eloquence') is a collection of sermons, letters, and sayings of Ali, the cousin and son-in-law of the Islamic prophet Muhammad, the first Shia Imam and the fourth Rashidun caliph. The collection was compiled by the prominent Shia scholar Sharif al-Radi in the 10th century AD. It is regarded as one of the most important works of Arabic literature and holds a prominent place in Shia Islam.

The book has been the focus of numerous commentaries, translations, and studies by both Sunni and Shia authors. Known for its moral aphorisms and eloquent content, Nahj al-Balagha is widely studied in the Islamic world and has considerably influenced the Arabic literature and rhetoric. Nahj al-Balagha is widely cherished and is commonly found in many Shia households, often kept alongside the Quran.

== Overview ==
Nahj al-balagha is a 10th-century collection of more than two hundred sermons, nearly eighty letters, and almost five-hundred sayings from Ali, the cousin and son-in-law of the Prophet Muhammad, the first Shia Imam, the fourth Rashidun caliph (r. 656–661). The sermons and letters in Nahj al-balagha offer a commentary on the political career of Ali, and have served as an ideological basis for Islamic governance. In particular, the letter of instructions therein addressed to Malik al-Ashtar (d. 657), a commander of Ali, has received special attention as a model for just and righteous governance. The book includes detailed discussions about social responsibilities, emphasizing that greater responsibilities result in greater rights.

Nahj al-balagha contains sensitive material, such as sharp criticism of Abu Bakr, Umar and Uthman, and disapproval of the triumvirate who revolted against Ali in the Battle of the Camel in 656, namely, Talha and Zubayr, who were both companions of Muhammad, and his widow Aisha. The book remains relevant to the ongoing debates about the role and status of women in Islamic societies. Nahj al-balagha contains passages about morality and doctrine, notably about the sovereignty of God and the essence of the Quran and the prophethood. Among them, the letter of life advices addressed to Hasan, the eldest son of Ali, has received considerable attention.

Recognized as an example of the most eloquent Arabic, Nahj al-balagha is said to have significantly influenced the Arabic literature and rhetoric. The book has been the focus of numerous commentaries, translations, and studies by both Sunni and Shia authors. In particular, the comprehensive commentary of the Mu'tazilite scholar Ibn Abil-Hadid (d. 1258) may have amplified the influence of Nahj al-balagha on theological speculation, philosophical thought, and literary scope. In it, he describes Nahj al-balagha as "below the speech of the Creator but above the speech of creatures."

== Authenticity ==
The compilation of Nahj al-balagha is often credited to Sharif al-Radi (d. 1015), a renowned Shia scholar who lived over three hundred years after Ali. A poet of some merit, al-Radi came from a distinguished Shia family in Baghdad and had connections to the Buyids, the Shia dynasty that ruled the area at the time. His intentions in compiling the book are described as "literary, ethical, and spiritual," and he does not provide isnads, that is, chains of transmission for his texts. In view of its sometimes sensitive content, the attribution of this book to Ali or al-Radi has long been a subject of polemic debates, as with the majority of the works about Shia theology.

The authenticity of Nahj al-balagha was first challenged over two centuries after al-Radi, perhaps indicating that his sources were well known during his lifetime but were lost gradually. Indeed, it was the Sunni historian Ibn Khallikan (d. 1282) who first suggested that the book was authored, rather than compiled, by al-Radi or by his brother Sharif al-Murtada (d. 1044), another prominent Shia theologian. Yet elsewhere Ibn Khallikan cited the book without hesitation. The Sunni theologians Ibn Taymiyyah (d. 1328) and al-Dhahabi (d. 1348) have similarly rejected most of Nahj al-balagha, and this has been the prevalent Sunni view to date. Among Western scholars, this view was shared by Carl Brockelmann (d. 1956) and Baron de Slane (d. 1878), who apparently mistook the word 'Murtada' on the manuscript as the name of its author and thus attributed the book to Sharif al-Murtada, probably unaware that Murtada is a well-known epithet of Ali. The Mu'tazilite Ibn Abil-Hadid was nevertheless confident that Nahj al-balagha is the work of Ali, but suspected that its controversial Shaqshaqiya sermon was authored by al-Radi. Alternatively, the Sunni historian Khatib al-Baghdadi (d. 1071) rejected only the eschatological sermons found in the book. By contrast, the Shia regard Nahj al-balagha as authentic.

=== Academic views ===
Much of the content of Nahj al-balagha already exists in earlier historical works, including Waq'at Siffin by the Shia historian Nasr ibn Muzahim (d. 827–828), Tarikh al-Ya'qubi by the Shia-leaning historian al-Ya'qubi (d. 897–898), Tarikh al-Tabari by the Sunni historian al-Tabari (d. 923), al-Bayan wa'l tabyin by the Sunni author al-Jahiz (d. 869), al-Kamil by the Sunni historian al-Mubarrad (d. 898), and al-Ansab by the Sunni historian al-Baladhuri (d. 892). These authors considerably predate al-Radi, which led the Islamicist Husain M. Jafri (d. 2019) to confirm the attribution of Nahj al-balagha to Ali. Similarly, the orientalist Laura Veccia Vaglieri (d. 1989) verified the attribution of 'a large portion' of Nahj al-balagha to Ali. Muktar Djebli, another expert, traced back 'a considerable number of passages' to Ali with their isnads. Some recent Shia works have similarly tracked the passages of the book in earlier sources, including Madarek-e Nahj al-balagha by Ostadi, Masadir Nahj al-balagha wa asaniduh by Abd al-Zahra al-Husayni al-Khatib, and Madarik Nahj al-balagha by Abd-Allah Nima. There are also other collections attributed to Ali that predate Nahj al-balagha, including Khutab Ali by the Sunni historian Ibn al-Kalbi (d. 819), al-Fihrist by the historian Ibn al-Nadim (d. c. 995), and Khutab Ali by al-Mada'ini (d. 843), a Sunni historian.

There is also strong circumstantial evidence that al-Radi was the compiler of the book: It appears that he included fragments of passages as he found them instead of combining them, thus presenting variants of the same sermon. In particular, the passages are not in the correct chronological order. All extant manuscripts of Nahj al-balagha also introduce al-Radi as the compiler of the material from Ali. Another evidence that supports the compilation of the book by ar-Radi is that he refers to his other works in the margins of Nahj al-balagha and vice versa, and discloses some of his sources, namely, al-Bayan, Tarikh al-Tabari, and Jamal by the Sunni historian al-Waqidi (d. 823). Finally, the linguistic style does not seem to change throughout the book, a style that has been highly praised for its eloquence (balagha) and rhetoric by some authorities, including al-Jahiz and the poet Ibn Nubata (d. 1366). Indeed, one argument for the fabrication of Nahj al-balagha is that its rhyming prose is too precise and polished, while the Shia counterargument is that Ali was a gifted orator, known for his saj', that is, improvised speech with rhyming prose. Nevertheless, some parts of Nahj al-balagha were likely copy-edited, and gauging the authenticity of its sensitive passages has proved challenging.

=== Shiqshiqiya sermon ===
As for the Shiqshiqiya sermon, in which the predecessors of Ali are sharply criticized, Sunni authorities reject it as the work of al-Radi, in line with their tendency to neutralize the conflicts among the companions after Muhammad. By contrast, among others, the Shia traditionist Abdul Hosein Amini (d. 1970) provided several chains of transmission for this sermon, some of which predate al-Radi. Other Shia scholars accept the authenticity of this sermon but do not claim tawatur, which is the highest level of credibility in hadith terminology. Among this last group is the Shia philosopher al-Bahrani (d. 1299), who also authored a commentary of Nahj al-balagha. This lack of tawatur leaves the possibility that some sensitive words in the sermon were not uttered by Ali, according to the Islamic author Reza Shah-Kazemi. Alternatively, Jafri suggests that the sermon is authentic for it was also quoted in earlier works, including Kitab al-Mahasin by the Shia traditionist Ahmad ibn Muhammad al-Ash'ari (d. 887), Kitab al-Gharat by the Shia historian Ibrahim ibn Muhammad al-Thaqafi (d. 896), and Kitab al-Insaf by the Mu'tazilite theologian Abu al-Qasim al-Balkhi (d. 1108).

=== Computational verification ===
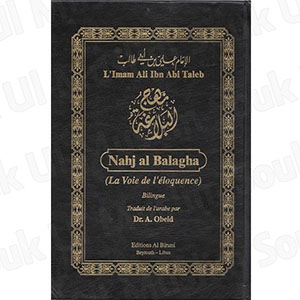
A modern copy of Nahj al-Balagha.

Sarwar and Mohamed recently used computational methods, mainly stylometric analysis and machine learning, to examine the authenticity of Nahj al-balagha by analyzing the 'morphological segmentation' of its text. They compared the book against the works of al-Radi and his brother, and concluded that the book is internally consistent, which suggests that it can be attributed to a single author, that the book was not authored by al-Radi or by his brother, Sharif al-Murtada. The authors thus conclude that the content of Nahj al-balagha can indeed be attributed to Ali.

=== Relevance ===
The debates about the authenticity of Nahj al-balagha may nevertheless be irrelevant to its value as a source of spiritual and ethical teachings, particularly among the Shias. In this vein, when asked to prove the attribution of Nahj al-balagha to Ali, the Shia philosopher Muhammad Husayn Tabatabai (d. 1981) responded, "For us the person who wrote Nahj al-balagha is Ali, even if he lived a century ago." The need for academic research about the book, independent of its authenticity, is a view championed by the philosopher Henry Corbin (d. 1978) and by Shah-Kazemi.

== Political views ==
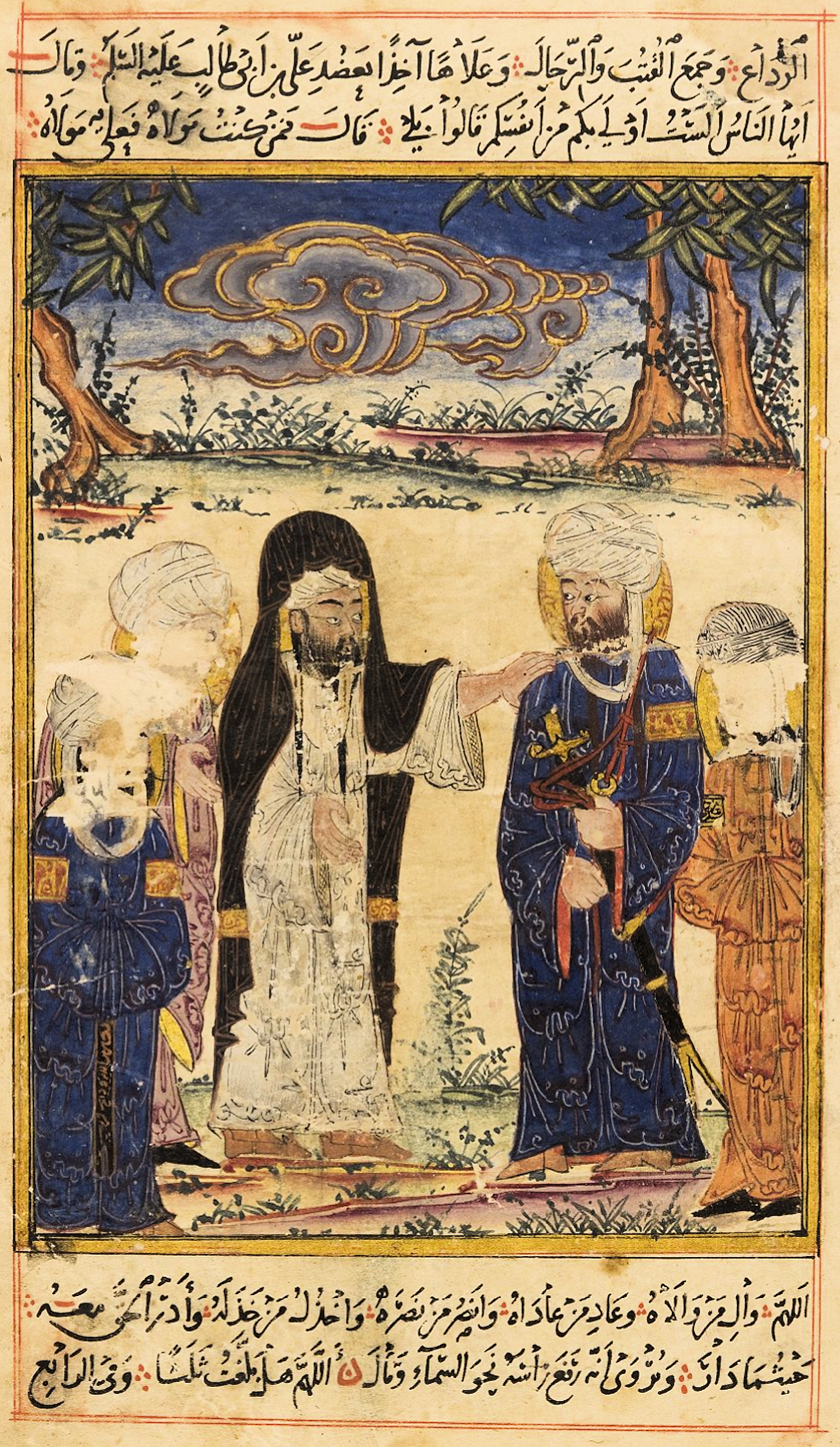
The Investiture of Ali by Muhammad at Ghadir Khumm, 1307 AD Ilkhanid manuscript.

The sermons and letters in Nahj al-balagha offer a commentary on the political career of Ali as the fourth Rashidun caliph, succeeding Uthman (r. 644–656), Umar (r. 634–644), and Abu Bakr (r. 632–634), who established the caliphate after the death of Muhammad in 632. Some sermons outlines the obligations of a leader, perhaps in response to the criticism from the Kharijites, a faction of Ali's army that abandoned him after the inconclusive Battle of Siffin in 657 against his archenemy Mu'awiya.

Through the ruler tax is collected, the enemy is fought, roadways are protected, and the right of the weak is taken from the strong till the virtuous enjoy peace and protection from [the oppression of] the wicked.

Certainly, there is no obligation on the imam except what has been devolved on him from God, namely, to convey warnings, to exert in good advice, to revive the Sunnah, to enforce penalties on those liable to them, and to issue shares to the deserving.

While Veccia Vaglieri wrote that Ali shows no inclination to legitimism in Sunni reports, multiple sermons in Nahj al-balagha suggest instead that he viewed himself as the rightful successor of Muhammad by virtue of his merits and his kinship with the prophet. Other speeches in Nahj al-balagha further indicate that he also saw the leadership as a prerogative of the Ahl al-Bayt, that is, the family of Muhammad. The legitimist view attributed to Ali in Nahj al-balagha, that he unequivocally considered the caliphate to be his right after Muhammad, is corroborated by some experts, including Mahmoud M. Ayoub (d. 2021), Wilferd Madelung (d. 2023), Hamid Mavani, Moojan Momen, and Shah-Kazemi. Some of these authors add that Ali also considered himself as the designated successor of Muhammad, probably referring to Muhammad's announcement at the Ghadir Khumm. Soon after his death, however, it became clear that Ali did not enjoy popular support, which is perhaps why he resigned himself to the caliphate of Abu Bakr, likely for the sake of the unity of a nascent Islam. Mavani and Maria M. Dakake, another Islamicist, nevertheless suggest that Ali viewed the succession of Abu Bakr as a digression which turned into a full-blown deviation with the rebellion of Mu'awiya during his own caliphate. This matches the Shia view, as represented by the Shia jurist Ruhollah Khomeini (d. 1989). By contrast, Ali mounts only a passing resistance to the caliphate of Abu Bakr (if any at all) in Sunni reports, which Ayoub describes as apologetic.

Beware! By God the son of Abu Quhafa [Abu Bakr] dressed himself with it [the caliphate] and he certainly knew that my position in relation to it was the same as the position of the axis in relation to the handmill.

— Shaqshaqiya sermon

By God, it never occurred to me, and I never imagined that after the prophet the Arabs would snatch away the caliphate from his Ahl al-Bayt [the members of the prophet's house], nor that they would take it away from me after him. But I suddenly noticed people surrounding the man [Abu Bakr] to swear him allegiance.

O my God! I beseech You to take revenge on the Quraysh and those who are assisting them, for they have cut asunder my kinship and overturned my cup, and have joined together to contest a right to which I was entitled more than anyone else.

I looked around but found no one to shield me, protect me or help me except the members of my family. I refrained from flinging them into death and therefore closed my eyes despite the dust; [I] kept swallowing saliva despite [the suffocation of] grief, and endured pangs of anger although it was more bitter than colocynth and more grievous than the bite of knives.

So I adopted patience, although there was a mote rankling in my eye and a bone sticking in my throat on seeing my heritage [the caliphate] being plundered, till the first one [Aba Bakr] died and handed over the reins of the caliphate to another person [Umar] after him.

— Shaqshaqiya sermon

You [the council members] are all well aware that I am the most entitled (ahaqqu) to this [the caliphate]. But by God, I shall resign myself [to the caliphate of Uthman] for as long as the affairs of the Muslims are being soundly governed, and for as long as there be no injustice except in relation to me alone. I do this, seeking the reward and the bounty of such a course of action, being detached from that to which you people aspire: the adornments and trappings [of political power].

— Addressed at the council convened by Umar to elect his successor in 644

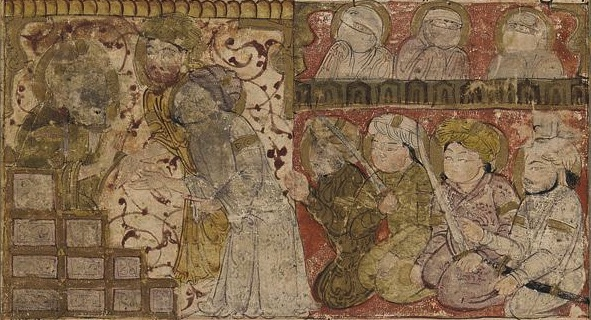
The election of Uthman, from Tarikhnama by the tenth-century historian Abu Ali Bal'ami

Yet there is also evidence in Nahj al-balagha that Ali regarded public endorsement as necessary for a legitimate rule. On this basis, Mavani speculates that Ali would have not sought the title of caliph had Muslims withheld their support from him after the assassination of Uthman in 656. When the Muslim community favored him, however, Ali probably no longer considered the caliphate as his right, but also as his duty.

People swore allegiance to me, not by force or compulsion, but obediently and out of free will.

Your allegiance to me [after the assassination of Uthman] was not without thinking (falta), nor is my and your position the same. I seek you for God's sake, but you seek me for your own benefits.

Let the most beloved of affairs to you be those most centered upon the right, the most comprehensive in justice, and the most inclusive of popular approval, for the disapproval of the common folk undermines the approval of the elite...

== Letter to al-Ashtar ==
The letter of instructions addressed to Malik al-Ashtar, the newly appointed governor of Ali in Egypt, outlines his conception of just and righteous governance. The theme of the letter can be summarized as justice and compassion for all, regardless of class, creed, and color. The letter also advises Malik to view his rule as a means of encouraging religious awakening and spiritual well-being within the community, to be a role model for his staff and others, to strive for justice and monitor his staff for its enforcement, and to consult often with his staff. Malik was killed in 657 at the instigation of Mu'awiya en route to Egypt to assume his post.

Infuse your heart with mercy for the subjects, love for them, and kindness towards them. Be not like a ravenous beast of prey above them, seeking to devour them. For they are of two types: either your brother in religion or one like you in creation.

Appoint as the commander of your soldiers the person whom you feel deeply is the most sincere in relation to God, the prophet, and your imam, the purest of heart, the one most excellent in forbearance (hilm); who is slow to anger, happy to pardon, kind to the weak, severe with the strong; one who is neither moved by violence nor held back by weakness. Cleave to those of noble descent, belonging to pious families of established name and repute, and to men known for their bravery, courage, generosity, and tolerance.

Never reject any call to peace made to you by your enemy... If you and your enemy enter into a solemn agreement, or if he obtains from you the right of protection (dhimma), then faithfully abide by what you have promised, and honorably uphold your obligation of protection.

Then–O God, O God!–[pay particular attention to] the lowest class, those who have no wherewithal, the destitute, the needy, the afflicted, the disabled. Within this class are those who beg, and those whose state of poverty calls out for relief, but they do not beg. Be mindful of God in regard to their rights, for He has entrusted these rights to your care. Assign to them a portion from your public funds, and a portion of the produce of what is taken as booty by the Muslims in every region; for those who are furthest have the same rights as those nearest.

Apportion a part of your time to those who have special needs, making yourself free to attend to them personally, sitting with them in a public assembly with all due humility before God, your Creator.

Dominate the zeal of your pride, the vehemence of your castigation, the power of your hand, and the sharpness of your tongue. Guard against these vices by restraining all impulsiveness, and putting off all resort to force until your anger subsides and you regain self-control. But you cannot attain such self-domination without increasing your preoccupation with the remembrance of your return to your Lord.

== Letter to Ibn Hunayf ==
A letter of admonishment in Nahj al-balagha is addressed to Uthman ibn Hunayf, the governor of Ali in Basra, who is said to have attended a lavish banquet, one which "rudely rebuffed the needy, and warmly embraced the wealthy," the letter adds.

Do you [Uthman ibn Hunayf] not see that, as regards his world, your imam is satisfied with two simple pieces of cloth, and as regards his food, with two loaves of bread? Doubtless, this is beyond your capacity, but at least lend me your help in realizing the virtues of restraint, exertion, modesty, and propriety.

Can I possibly allow myself to be called Commander of the Faithful (Amir al-mu'minin) if I do not share with them [i.e., with the faithful] the adversities of fate, if I do not give them a role-model to emulate when confronted with the hardships of life?

Blessed be the person who discharges his obligations toward God; struggles courageously against all misfortune; abandons sleep at night, until, when slumber overpowers him, lies down on the earth as his bed, using his hand as his pillow, doing so in the company of those whose eyes are rendered sleepless by the awesome anticipation of their return [to God]; whose bodies stay away from their beds [see verse 32:16 of the Quran]; whose lips are ever-humming with the invocation of the name of their Lord; whose sins have been dissolved through prolonged cries for forgiveness. They are the 'partisans of God': "Verily the partisans of God, they are the successful ones!" (verse 58:22 of the Quran).

== Life advices to Hasan ==
A letter of life advices in Nahj al-balagha is addressed to Hasan, the eldest son of Ali.

I admonish you to have constant awareness of God (taqwa), O my son, to abide by His commandments, to fill your heart with His remembrance (dhikrihi), and to cling to the rope He has held out to you [see verse 3:103 of the Quran]; for no protection is greater than that which extends from Him to you–provided you take hold of His rope [with an absolute trust]. Enliven your heart with exhortation (maw'iza), mortify it by renunciation (zahada), empower it with certainty (yaqin), enlighten it with wisdom, humble it by the remembrance of death (dhikr al-mawt), establish it in [constant awareness of] the evanescence (fana') [of all things other than God],...

My dear son, take your soul as the criterion when you want to judge deeds which take place between you and others–then desire for others what you desire for yourself, and help others to avoid what you avoid yourself. Do not be cruel, as you do not want to receive cruelty. Do good to others as you would like others to do good to you. What you consider ugly in others, consider it the same in yourself. What you do not know, do not talk about it even though you know a little. Do not say to others what you would not like to be said about yourself. And know that selfishness is the squander of reason. Give away what you have gained and do not save it for others or yourself. And when you have reached such a stage of life, thank God for these things.

Do not call people to fight; but if you are challenged to fight, then accept. Truly the one who calls others to fight is an oppressive rebel (baghi), and an oppressive rebel is one who will inevitably be laid low.

== Sermons ==
The English translation of Nahj al-balagha by Ali Reza includes more than two-hundred sermons attributed to Ali, listed below after minor edits.

1. Creation of the universe, "God is with everything, but not through association; and other than everything, but not through separation." 2. Age of Ignorance, Household of Muhammad, hypocrites 3. Shaqshaqiya (lit. 'roar of the camel'), in which Ali lays out his claim to the caliphate and his superiority over his predecessors 4. His far-sightedness and his steadfastness in Islam; 5. When Abbas and Abu Sufyan offered to pay allegiance to him for the caliphate after Muhammad's death 6. On being advised not to chase Talha and Zubayr for fighting 7. The hypocrites 8. About Zubayr at a time for which it was appropriate 9. Cowardice of his enemies in the Battle of the Camel; 10. Talha and Zubayr; 11. When he gave the standard of the Battle of the Camel to his son Mohammad; 12. When, after his victory in the Battle of the Camel, one of his comrades said, "I wish my brother had been present and he too would have seen what success and victory God had given you" 13. Condemning the people of Basra; 14. Also in condemnation of the people of Basra; 15. After resuming the land grants made by Uthman; 16. Delivered when the people of Medina swore allegiance to him 17. About those who sit for dispensation of justice among people but are not fit for it 18. In disparagement of contradictory views among Muslim jurists 19. Treachery and hypocrisy of al-Ashath al-Kindi; 20. Death and taking lessons from it 21. Advice to keep light in this world 22. About those who accused him of killing Uthman; 23. Keeping aloof from envy, and good behavior toward kin 24. Exhorting people for jihad 25. When his men were overpowered by Mu'awiya's men 26. People after Muhammad's death, the settlement between Mu'awiya and Amr ibn al-As; 27. Exhorting people for jihad 28. The transient nature of this world and the importance of the next world 29. About those who found pretexts at the time of jihad 30. In connection with Uthman's killing 31. Before the Battle of the Camel, he sent Ibn Abbas to Zubayr to advise him back to obedience 32. Disparagement of the world and categories of people 33. At the time of setting out for the Battle of the Camel; 34. Exhorting people to fight against the people of Syria; 35. After arbitration 36. Warning the people of Nahrawan of their fate 37. His steadfastness and precedence in Islam; 38. In disparagement of those in doubt 39. In disparagement of those who shrink from fighting 40. In response to the slogan of Kharijites: "Judgment belongs to God alone" 41. In condemnation of treason 42. Heart's desires and hopes 43. In response to a suggestion of war 44. When Masqala defected to Syria; 45. The greatness of God and the lowliness of this world 46. When he decided to march toward Syria; 47. Calamities befalling Kufa; 48. At the time of marching toward Syria; 49. God's greatness and sublimity 50. Admixture of right and wrong 51. When his men were prevented from taking water from the Euphrates river 52. Reward and punishment in the next world 53. On the swear of allegiance 54. When his men showed impatience on his delay in giving them permission to fight in Siffin; 55. Steadiness on the battlefield 56. Mu'awiya swallows whatever he gets and craves for what he does not get 57. Addressing the Kharijites; 58. When he was told that the Kharijites had crossed the bridge of Nahrawan; 59. When he was told that the Kharijites had been totally annihilated 60. Do not fight the Kharijites after me!; 61. When he was warned of being killed by deceit 62. Transience of this world 63. Decline and destruction of this world 64. Attributes of God; 65. Ways of fighting 66. On hearing the account of what took place in Saqifah of Bani-Sa'ida; 67. When Muhammad ibn Abi Bakr, governor of Egypt, was overpowered and killed 68. Admonishing his companions for careless behavior 69. In the morning of the day he was fatally struck with a sword 70. In condemnation of the people of Iraq; 71. Praise for Muhammad; 72. When Hasan and Husayn interceded on behalf of Marwan; 73. When the elective committee (shura) decided to swear allegiance to Uthman; 74. When he learned that the Umayyads blamed him for killing Uthman; 75. Preaching and counseling	76. Banu Umayya; 77. One of his supplications 78. Prophecy of astrologers 79. Shortcomings of women 80. Way of preaching and counseling 81. World and its people 82. Al-Gharra (lit. 'the brilliant'), in which Ali enjoined people to piety 83. Amr ibn al-As; 84. Perfection of God and counseling 85. Preparing for the hereafter by following God's commandments 86. Faithful and unfaithful believers 87. Factions of community 88. Holy prophet 89. God's attributes and some advice 90. Al-Ashbaah (lit. 'the skeletons'), in which Ali talked about the creation of the universe 91. When people decided to swear allegiance to him after the murder of Uthman; 92. Annihilation of the Kharijites, mischief mongering of the Umayyads, vastness of his own knowledge 93. God's praise and eulogy of the prophets 94. Age of Ignorance and Muhammad's efforts to disseminate God's message 95. In eulogy of Muhammad; 96. Admonishing his companions 97. Oppression of the Umayyads; 98. Abstinence of the world and vicissitudes of time 99. Muhammad and his descendants 100. Vicissitudes of time 101. Day of Judgement; 102. Abstemiousness and fear of God, attributes of the enlightened 103. Age of Ignorance, Muhammad's efforts to spread God's message 104. In eulogy of Muhammad, the Umayyads, importance of imam 105. Islam: most bright of all paths 106. Describing the days of Siffin; 107. Vicissitudes of time, blaming Muslims; 108. Might of God, Day of Judgement, Muhammad and his descendants 109. Pinnacles of Islam; 110. Caution about this world 111. Angel of Death and the departure of spirit 112. World and people 113. Abstemiousness, fear of God, importance of preparing for the hereafter 114. Seeking rain 115. Troubles which would arise, Day of Judgment; 116. Rebuking misers 117. In praise of his faithful companions 118. When he exhorted people to jihad but was met with silence 119. Household of Muhammad, the laws of Islam; 120. Reasons for objecting to arbitration at first and allowing it later 121. Addressing the Kharijites at their camp when they persisted in their rejection of the arbitration 122. Supporting the weak and the low-spirited on the battlefield of Siffin; 123. Exhorting his followers to fight 124. Kharijites and arbitration 125. In response to the objections to the equal distribution of shares from the treasury 126. Clarifying confusion for the Kharijites; 127. Foretelling the capture of Basra and the Mongol conquest 128. Measures and weights 129. When Abu Dharr was exiled to al-Rabathah; 130. Grounds for accepting the caliphate and the qualities of a ruler 131. Death and counseling 132. On the glory of God, on the Quran and Muhammad; 133. When Umar consulted him about taking part in the march towards the Roman Empire; 134. Addressing al-Mogheera when he wanted to speak in support of Uthman; 135. Take revenge for the oppressed from the oppressor 136. Talha and Zubayr; 137. Foretelling events 138. On the occasion of the elective committee after Umar's death 139. Backbiting and speaking ill of others "Those who do not commit sins and have been gifted with safety (from sins) should take pity on sinners. Gratefulness should be their indulgence and it should prevent them from (finding faults with) others." 140. Against reliance on heresy 141. Misplaced generosity 142. Praying for rain 143. Past prophets, Household of Muhammad; 144. This world, on innovation (bidʻah); 145. When Umar consulted him about taking part in the Battle of Persia; 146. Divine mission of Muhammad and what happens when people go against the Quran; 147. Talha and Zubayr and the people of Basra; 148. His last will 149. Coming events and the hypocrites' activities 150. Advice against disorder, oppression, and unlawful earning 151. God and His vicegerents 152. The negligent, beasts, and carnivores 153. The Household of Muhammad and their enemies 154. Wonderful creation of the bat 155. Malice borne by Aisha and warning the people of Basra; 156. Urging people towards piety 157. Muhammad and the Quran; 158. Good behavior and ignoring people's faults 159. Following the examples of Muhammad and the past prophets 160. Divine mission of Muhammad and lessons from this world 161. Usurpation of the caliphate from him 162. Attributes of God; 163. Dialogue with Uthman; 164. Magnificence of the Creator in birds	165. Observing courtesy and kindness, the autocracy of the Umayyads; 166. Fulfilment of obligations, advice to fear God in all matters, "Fear God in the matter of His creatures and His cities because you will be questioned even about lands and beasts." 167. In response to the demand for avenging Uthman; 168. When the people of Jamal (lit. 'camel') set off for Basra (prior to the Battle of the Camel); 169. In response to Kolayb al-Jarmi who came from Basra to enquire about his position vis-a-vis the people of Jamal; 170. When he decided to fight the enemy face to face at Siffin; 171. Elective committee after Umar, and people of Jamal; 172. On eligibility for the caliphate, the need for sagacity in fighting against Muslims; 173. When he received the news that Talha and Zubayr had left for Basra to fight against him 174. Warning to neglectful people 175. Greatness of the Quran, following the Sunnah and refraining from innovation 176. The two arbiters after the Battle of Siffin; 177. Transience of this world and the causes of decline in God's blessings 178. In reply to a question about seeing God; 179. Condemning his disobedient men 180. The group who decided to join the Kharijites; 181. Learning from history, al-Mahdi; 182. About the importance of the Quran; 183. On hearing a Kharijite raising the slogan, "judgment belongs to God alone" 184. Creation of the universe 185. Oneness of God; 186. Vicissitudes of time 187. Transience of this world 188. Steadfast and transient belief, the challenge: "Ask me before you miss me" 189. Fear of God and love for the Household of Muhammad; 190. World and its people 191. al-Qasi'a (lit. 'the abasement'): Warning about Satan, caution against vanity and other vices, his precedence in Islam; 192. Qualities of the God-fearing; 193. Age of Ignorance, the animosity of Arab tribes, the position of hypocrites 194. Fear of God and details about the Day of Judgement; 195. Age of Ignorance, the transience of this world and the state of its inhabitants 196. His attachment to Muhammad and the performance of his funeral rites 197. Fear of God, praise for Islam, Muhammad, and the Quran; 198. Prayer, Zakat, and fulfillment of obligations 199. Treachery of Mu'awiya; 200. One should not be afraid of the scarcity of those who tread on the right path 201. On the occasion of the burial of his wife, Fatima; 202. Transience of this world, and the importance of preparation for the hereafter 203. Warning about the dangers of the Day of Judgement; 204. In response to Talha and Zubayr's complaint for not consulting them in the affairs 205. On hearing some of his men verbally abusing the Syrians during the Battle of Siffin; 206. About Hasan when Ali saw him proceeding rapidly to fight in the Battle of Siffin; 207. When his army was on the verge of mutiny in connection with the arbitration 208. When he noticed the vastness of his companion's house 209. Causes of difference in the traditions and categories of narrators 210. Greatness of the universe 211. Those who give up supporting the righteous cause 212. Sublimity of God and eulogy of Muhammad; 213. Muhammad's nobility of descent, the characteristics of the virtuous 214. Prayer he often recited 215. Mutual rights of the ruler and the ruled 216. Excesses of the Quraysh, on rebels 217. On passing by the corpses of Talha and another rebel, who were killed in the Battle of the Camel; 218. Qualities of the pious 219. Exegesis of verse 102:1–2 of the Quran; 220. Exegesis of verse 24:36–37; 221. Exegesis of verse 82:6; 222. Keeping aloof from oppression, on the poverty of his brother Aqil; 223. A supplication 224. Transience of the world and the helplessness of those in graves 225. A supplication 226. About a companion who passed away before the occurrence of the troubles 227. Allegiance to him as the caliph 228. An account of those who remain apprehensive of death 229. About Muhammad; 230. When Abd al-God ibn Zam'a asked him for money from the treasury 231. When his nephew was unable to deliver a sermon 232. Causes for differences in the features and traits of people 233. Funeral rites of Muhammad; 234. His immigration to Medina, following Muhammad's; 235. Preparing for the hereafter 236. The two arbitrators after the Battle of Siffin; 237. The Household of Muhammad; 238. When Uthman sent word that Ali should leave for Yanbu; 239. Exhorting his men to jihad

== Letters ==
The English translation of Nahj al-balagha by Ali Reza includes nearly eighty letters attributed to Ali, listed below after minor edits.

1. To the people of Kufa at the time of his march from Medina to Basra; 2. To the people of Kufa after the victory of Basra; 3. To his judge in Kufa; 4. To one of his army officers 5. To the governor of Azerbaijan in Iran; 6. To Mu'awiya; 7. To Mu'awiya; 8. To his messenger to Mu'awiya when his return was delayed 9. To Mu'awiya; 10. To Mu'awiya "You have called me to war. Better to leave the people on one side, come out to me and spare both parties from fighting so that it may be known who of us has a rusted heart and covered eyes." 11. To the commander of a vanguard contingent dispatched to Syria; 12. To a contingent dispatched to engage the enemy 13. To two of his army officers 14. To the army before the Battle of Siffin; 15. Invocation when he faced the enemy 16. Instructions for warriors "By Him who broke open the seed and created living beings, they [the enemy] had not accepted Islam but secured safety (by only verbally professing it) and had hidden their disbelief. When they found helpers for their disbelief, they disclosed it." 17. In response to a letter from Mu'awiya; 18. To his governor in Basra; 19. To one of his officers 20. To the deputy governor of Basra "If I come to know that you have misappropriated the funds of Muslims, small or big, I shall inflict upon you such punishment which will leave you empty-handed, heavy-backed, and humiliated." 21. To the deputy governor of Basra	22. To his governor in Basra "Do not be much pleased on what you secure from this world, nor get extremely grieved over what you miss out of it. Your worry should be about what is to come after death." 23. His will shortly before his death "By God, this sudden death is not an event that I dislike, nor it is an incident that I hate. I am just like a night traveler who reaches the spring or like a seeker who secures. And whatever with God is better for the righteous ones." 24. His will upon his return from Siffin; 25. Instructions for tax collectors 26. Instructions for an officer sent to collect tax 27. Instructions to Muhammad ibn Abi Bakr, upon appointment as the governor of Egypt; 28. In response to Mu'awiya; 29. To the people of Basra; 30. To Mu'awiya; 31. Instructions for Hasan, when returning from Siffin; 32. To Mu'awiya; 33. To the governor of Mecca; 34. To Muhammad ibn Abi Bakr after learning that he had taken over the position of Malik al-Ashtar as the governor of Egypt after the latter died 35. To Ibn Abbas after Muhammad ibn Abi Bakr was killed 36. To his brother Aqil; 37. To Mu'awiya; 38. To Egyptians after the appointment of Malik al-Ashtar as their governor 39. To Amr ibn al-As; 40. To one of his officers 41. To one of his officers	42. To the governor of Bahrain, whom he later removed 43. To the governor of Ardasheer Khorra in Iran; 44. To Ziyad ibn Abin, when Ali learned that Mu'awiya had approached him "You should be on your guard against him [Mu'awiya] because he is (like) the Satan who approaches a believer from the front and from the back, from the right and from the left." 45. To the governor of Basra upon learning that he had accepted an invitation to a lavish banquet 46. To one of his officers "Bend your wings (in humbleness) before the subjects." 47. Last will for Hasan and Husayn "Fear God and keep God in view in the matter of orphans." 48. To Mu'awiya; 49. To Mu'awiya; 50. To the officers of his army 51. To tax collectors "For the collection of tax from the people, do not sell their winter or summer clothes, nor cattle which they work with, nor slaves. Do not whip anyone for the sake of one dirham. Do not touch the property of anyone, be it a Muslim or a protected non-believer." 52. To various governors concerning prayers 53. Instructions for Malik al-Ashtar upon his appointment as the governor of Egypt; 54. To Talha and Zubayr; 55. To Mu'awiya; 56. Instructions to the commander of a vanguard contingent dispatched to Syria; 57. To the people of Kufa when he marched from Medina to Basra; 58. An announcement about what took place in Siffin; 59. To the governor of Holwaan "All the people should be equal in right before you; injustice cannot be a substitute for justice."	60. To the officers through whose jurisdiction the army passed 61. Expressing his displeasure to Kumayl, the governor of Heet, who was unable to prevent enemy raids 62. To Egyptians through Malik al-Ashtar, upon his appointment as their governor 63. To Abu Musa Ash'ari, the governor of Kufa, when Ali learned that he discouraged jihad 64. In response to Mu'awiya; 65. To Mu'awiya; 66. To Ibn Abbas (a different version); 67. To the governor of Mecca; 68. To Salman the Persian, before his caliphate 69. To al-H'arith al-Hamdani; 70. To the governor of Medina about those who had defected to Syria "Do not feel sorry for their numbers, so lost from you, or their help, of which you are deprived. It suffices that they have walked into misguidance and you have been relieved of them." 71. To an administrator accused of misappropriation 72. To Ibn Abbas; 73. To Mu'awiya; 74. Protocol of an agreement between the tribes of Rabi'a and the people of Yemen; 75. To Mu'awiya; 76. Instructions to Ibn Abbas upon his appointment as the governor of Basra; 77. Instructions to Ibn Abbas before talks with the Kharijites; 78. In response to Abu Musa al-Ash'ari's letter about the two arbitrators 79. To the army officers when he was elected as the caliph "Now, what ruined those before you was that they denied people their rights and then they had to purchase them (by bribes)."

== Sayings ==
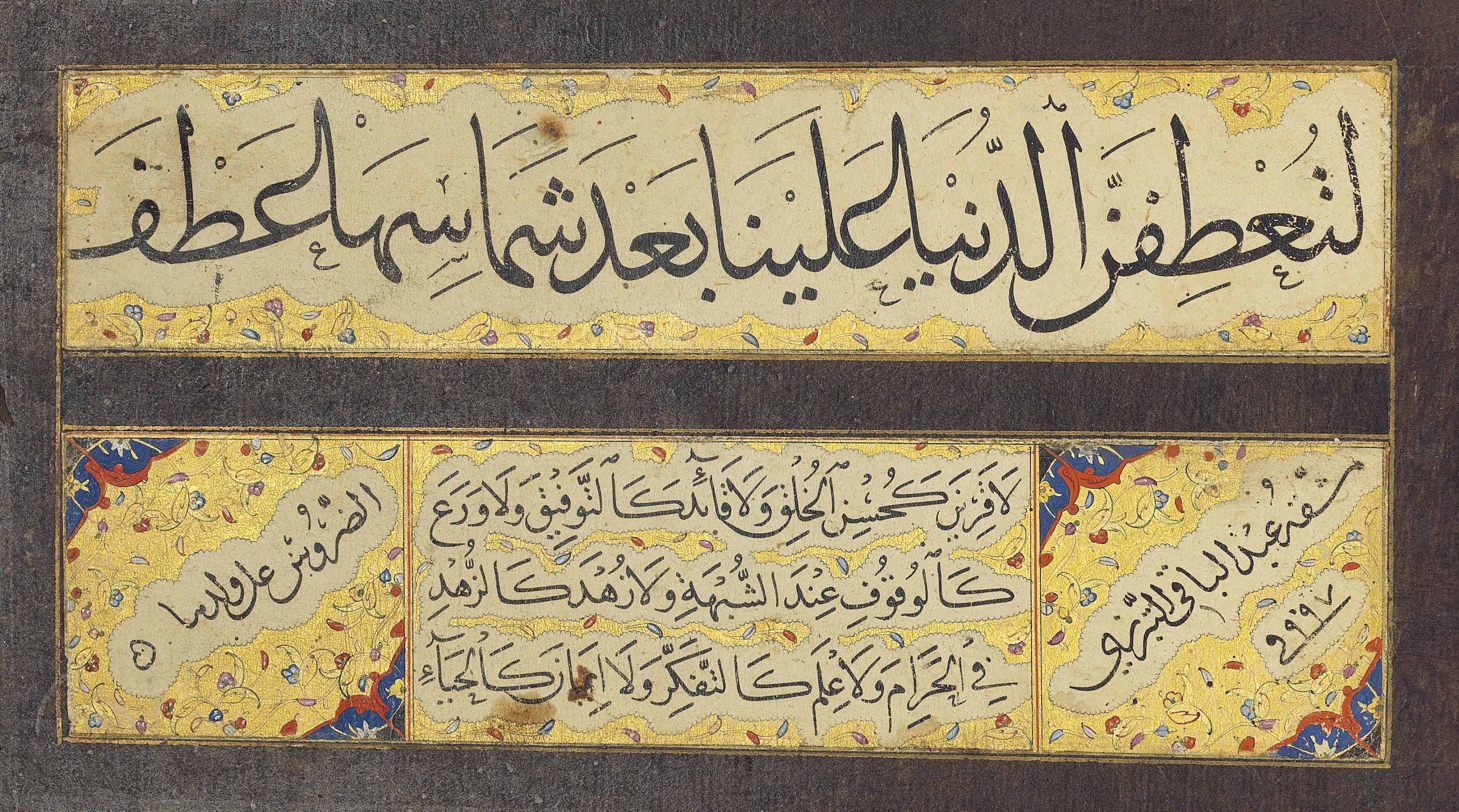
Persian manuscript on card. It contains a ruling from Ali in the Nahj al-Balagha. Safavid Iran, dated 1588.

The English translation of Nahj al-balagha by Ali Reza includes almost five hundred sayings attributed to Ali, a few of which are given below. The rest of the aphorisms below are quoted from Nahj al-balagha by different authors.

- I love the opinion of an old man more than the determination of a young man.
- You will not find an ignorant person but at one extreme or the other.
- If it were so [and we were bound to an unavoidable destiny], there would have been no question of reward or chastisement and there would have been no sense in God's promises or warnings.
- Whoso establishes well-being between himself and God, God establishes well-being between him and mankind.
- Behave yourself with others in such a way that if you die, people will cry for you, and if you stay alive they seek your presence.
- Opportunity is just like a passing cloud. Therefore, take advantage of the right opportunities while they are within sight.
- Victory depends upon thinking ahead, and thinking ahead upon mental resourcefulness and decision on keeping secrecy.
- The one who is a dictator will be killed soon and the one who consults with the people will share their wisdom.
- The one who observes his own deficiencies will overlook another's inadequacy.
- Contentment is a wealth that does not diminish.
- When you overpower your enemy, make your forgiveness of him an expression of gratitude for having prevailed over him.
- There is no goodness in a good thing if it is followed by [hell] fire, and there is no evil in an evil thing if it is followed by the Garden [of heaven]. Every benefit apart from the Garden is negligible, and every tribulation apart from fire is well-being (afiya).
- Do not give up bidding for good and forbidding from evil, lest the mischievous gain positions over you, and then if you pray, the prayer will not be granted.
- He who rules, appropriates.
- The sin that grieves you is better, in the sight of God, than the virtue that makes you proud.
- No act is negligible if it is accompanied by piety.
- He who prays without making an effort is like one who shoots arrows without a bow.
- Justice puts everything in its right place.
- People renounce no part of their religion for the sake of rectifying their world without God opening them up to something worse than it.
- A sleep with certainty is better than a prayer with doubt.

== Translations ==
Nahj al-balagha has been translated from Arabic into many languages. A few of these translations are listed below:

- Nahj al-Balāghah: The Wisdom and Eloquence of ʿAlī. Edited and translated by Qutbuddin, Tahera. Leiden: Brill Academic Publishers. 2024. [OPEN ACCESS]
- Nahjul Balagha - Veltalenhedens Sti (in Danish). Translated by Maanaki, Haydar. Imam al-Mahdi Bogfond. 2013.
- Imaam Ali bin Abi-Taalib's Sermons, Letters & Sayings as Compiled by Sayyid Shareef Ar-Razi in Nahjol-Balaagha, Peak of Eloquence. Translated by Reza, Sayed Ali. World Ognanization for Islamic Services. 1987.
- The Style of Eloquence. Translated by Pazargadi, Alaeddin. Rahnama. 2000.
- La Voie de l'éloquence (in French). Translated by Obeid, A. Dar al-Biruni. 2004.
- La Voie de l'éloquence (in French). Translated by Abul Naga, Sayyid ‘Attia. Ansariyan. 1989.
- Nahdsch-ul-Balagha - Pfad der Eloquenz (in German). Translated by Özoguz, Fatima. m-haditec GmbH & Co. KG. 2007.
- Nahdż al-Balagha (in Polish). Translated by Miernik, Arkadiusz. Instytut al-Mahdi. 2012.
- Nahj al-Balagha - Calea Vorbirii Alese (in Romanian). Translated by Grigore, George. Kriterion. 2008.
- Путь красноречия (in Russian). Translated by Черниенко, Тараса. Казань. 2010.
- La Cumbre de la Elocuencia (in Spanish). Translated by Morales, Muhammad Ali Anzaldua; Arce, Abdul Jabir. Biblioteca Islámica Ahlul Bait. 2010.
- نھج البلاغه (in Persian). Translated by دشتی, محمد. مشهور.
- نھج البلاغہ (in Urdu). Translated by جوادی, علامہ ذیشان حیدر. محفوظ بک ایجنسی.

== Commentaries ==
Though there are numerous commentaries of Nahj al-Balagha in Arabic and Farsi, the only complete commentary in English to date is the recently published work Pinnacle of Eloquence by Dr. Tahir Ridha Jaffer. This is a five volume commentary of the entire text, with two volumes already published and three forthcoming. The commentary is open access and available from the author's website.

== See also ==
- Al-Sahifa al-sajjadiyya
- Ghurar al-hikam
- List of Shia books
- Sharif al-Radi
- The pious sermon
- Sermon al-Ashbah
- The Sermon of al-Gharra
- The Sermon of al-Qāsi'a
- Bibliography of Ali ibn Abi Talib

== Sources ==
- Amir-Moezzi, Mohammad Ali (2014). "Ghadīr Khumm". In Fleet, Kate; Krämer, Gudrun; Matringe, Denis; Nawas, John; Stewart, Devin J. (eds.). Encyclopaedia of Islam (Third ed.). doi:10.1163/1573-3912_ei3_COM_27419. ISBN 9789004269613.
- Ayoub, Mahmoud M. (2014). The Crisis of Muslim History: Religion and Politics in Early Islam. Oneworld Publications. ISBN 9781780746746.
- Al-Buraey, Muhammad (1986). Administrative Development. Routledge. ISBN 9780710300591.
- Bahramian, Ali (2015). "ʿAlī b. Abī Ṭālib 3. Caliphate". In Daftary, Farhad (ed.). Encyclopaedia Islamica. Translated by Melvin-Koushki, Matthew. doi:10.1163/1875-9831_isla_COM_0252.
- Daftary, Farhad (2013). A History of Shi'i Islam. I.B. Tauris. ISBN 9781780768410.
- Dakake, Maria Massi (2007). The Charismatic Community: Shi'ite Identity in Early Islam. State University of New York Press. ISBN 9780791470336.
- Djebli, Moktar (2012). "Nahd̲j̲ al-Balāg̲h̲a". In Bearman, P.; Bianquis, Th.; Bosworth, C.E.; van Donzel, E.; Heinrichs, W.P. (eds.). Encyclopaedia of Islam (Second ed.). doi:10.1163/1573-3912_islam_SIM_5752. ISBN 9789004161214.
- Esposito, John L., ed. (2003). The Oxford Dictionary of Islam. Oxford University Press. ISBN 978-0195125597.
- Glassé, Cyril (2001). "Ali ibn Abi Talib". The New Encyclopedia of Islam. AltaMira Press. p. 39. ISBN 978-0759101890.
- Gleave, Robert M. (2008). "ʿAlī b. Abī Ṭālib". In Fleet, Kate; Krämer, Gudrun; Matringe, Denis; Nawas, John; Stewart, Devin J. (eds.). Encyclopaedia of Islam (Third ed.). doi:10.1163/1573-3912_ei3_COM_26324. ISBN 9789004171374.
- Jafri, S.H.M. (1979). Origins and Early Development of Shia Islam. Longman.
- Lucas, Scott C. (2004). Constructive Critics, Ḥadīth Literature, and the Articulation of Sunnī Islam: The Legacy of the Generation of Ibn Saʻd, Ibn Maʻīn, and Ibn Ḥanbal. Brill. ISBN 9789004133198.
- Madelung, Wilferd (1997). The Succession to Muḥammad: A Study of the Early Caliphate. Cambridge University Press. ISBN 9780521561815.
- Mavani, Hamid (2013). Religious authority and political thought in Twelver Shi'ism: From Ali to post-Khomeini. Routledge. ISBN 9780415624404.
- Modarressi, Hossein (2003). Tradition and Survival: A Bibliographical Survey of Early Shī'ite Literature. Vol. 1. Oneworld Academic. ISBN 9781851683314.
- Momen, Moojan (1985). An Introduction to Shi'i Islam. Yale University Press. ISBN 9780853982005.
- Nasr, Seyyed Hossein; Afsaruddin, Asma (2021). "Ali". Encyclopedia Britannica.
- Pourebrahim, S., Al-Hoseini, S. M. M., & Iranshahi, T. F. The Role of Conceptual Blending in Meaning Constructing of Proverbs in Animal Domain of Nahj al-Balaghah. Journal Researches of Quran and Hadith Sciences, Vol.20, No.1, Serial. 57, Spring 2023.
- Sarwar, Raheem; Mohamed, Emad (2022). "Author Verification of Nahj Al-balagha". Digital Scholarship in the Humanities. 37/4 (4): 1210–1222. doi:10.1093/llc/fqab103. hdl:2436/624435.
- Shah-Kazemi, Reza (2006a). "Ali ibn Abi Talib". In Meri, Josef W. (ed.). Medieval Islamic civilization: An encyclopedia. Routledge. p. 36. ISBN 9780415966900.
- Shah-Kazemi, Reza (2006b). "A Sacred Conception of Justice: Imam 'Ali's Letter to Malik al-Ashtar". In Lakhani, M. Ali (ed.). The Sacred Foundations of Justice in Islam: The Teachings of 'Alī Ibn Abī Ṭālib. World Wisdom. pp. 61–108. ISBN 9781933316260.
- Shah-Kazemi, Reza (2007). Justice and Remembrance: Introducing the Spirituality of Imam 'Ali. I.B. Tauris. ISBN 9781845115265.
- Shah-Kazemi, Reza (2019). Imam 'Ali: Concise History, Timeless Mystery. The Matheson Trust. ISBN 9781908092182.
- Shehabi, Mahmood (1993). "Shi'a". In Morgan, Kenneth W. (ed.). Islam, the Straight Path: Islam Interpreted by Muslims. Motilal Banarsidass. pp. 180–223. ISBN 8120804031.
- Soufi, Denise Louise (1997). The Image of Fatima in Classical Muslim Thought (PhD thesis). Princeton University. ProQuest 304390529.
- Thomas, David (2008). "Nahj al-balagha". In Netton, Ian Richard (ed.). Encyclopedia of Islamic civilisation and religion. Routledge. pp. 477–478. ISBN 9780700715886.
- Veccia Vaglieri, L. (2012). "ʿAlī b. Abī Ṭālib". In Bearman, P.; Bianquis, Th.; Bosworth, C.E.; van Donzel, E.; Heinrichs, W.P. (eds.). Encyclopaedia of Islam (Second ed.). doi:10.1163/1573-3912_islam_COM_0046. ISBN 9789004161214.
