= The Sermon of al-Gharra =

The Sermon of al-Gharra is a sermon in which Ali ibn Abi Talib spoke about this world and the afterlife and urged people to be pious.

== Structure of the sermon ==
Ali begins this sermon by praising God and bearing witness to the prophethood of Muhammad. He continues by urging people to be pious, reminding them of the blessings God has given them, describing this world as a place of trial, and reminding them of death, the grave, the Day of Judgment, and the destruction of the human body and how it becomes food for reptiles. Ali ibn Abi Talib, while continuing to speak about death, life, and the fate of people, talks about the creation of man from the time he was only a drop of semen until his death and explains it in a very clear way. He then warns people about facing God and being held accountable before Him. He then speaks about the hardships of death, separation from loved ones, the punishment of Hell, and the hardships of life after death, and calls on people to seek refuge in God.

The words of Ali ibn Abi Talib in this sermon can be divided into several parts:

- Praise of God and testimony to Muhammad's prophethood
- Advice to be pious
- Warning about the World
- Death and resurrection
- Life, Death, and Accountability
- The importance of piety and reminding
- Reminding people of God's blessings
- Preparation for the Day of Judgment
- Warning about Satan
- The creation of man
- Learning from those who have passed away

== Reason for the Sermon ==
In Hilyat al-Awliya wa Tabaqat al-Asfiya, Abu Nu'aym al-Isfahani narrates a report from Ali in which Ali attended a funeral. When the body was placed in the grave, the family of the deceased cried and wailed. Ali asked them, “Why are you crying?” He then said that if they had seen what the dead person had seen, they would have been so affected by what had happened to him that they would have forgotten about their dead. After that, Ali stood up and delivered a sermon.

== Part of the sermon ==
Ali ibn Abi Talib said in part of this sermon:

فَإِنَّ الدُّنْیَا رَنِقٌ مَشْرَبُهَا رَدِغٌ مَشْرَعُهَا یُونِقُ مَنْظَرُهَا وَ یُوبِقُ مَخْبَرُهَا غُرُورٌ حَائِلٌ وَ ضَوْءٌ آفِلٌ وَ ظِلٌّ زَائِلٌ وَ سِنَادٌ مَائِلٌ حَتَّی إِذَا أَنِسَ نَافِرُهَا وَ اطْمَأَنَّ نَاکِرُهَا قَمَصَتْ بِأَرْجُلِهَا وَ قَنَصَتْ بِأَحْبُلِهَا وَ أَقْصَدَتْ بِأَسْهُمِهَا وَ أَعْلَقَتِ الْمَرْءَ أَوْهَاقَ الْمَنِیَّةِ قَائِدَةً لَهُ إِلَی ضَنْکِ الْمَضْجَعِ وَ وَحْشَةِ الْمَرْجِعِ وَ مُعَایَنَةِ الْمَحَلِّ وَ ثَوَابِ الْعَمَلِ. وَ کَذَلِکَ الْخَلَفُ بِعَقْبِ السَّلَفِ لَا تُقْلِعُ الْمَنِیَّةُ اخْتِرَاماً وَ لَا یَرْعَوِی الْبَاقُونَ اجْتِرَاماً یَحْتَذُونَ مِثَالًا وَ یَمْضُونَ أَرْسَالًا إِلَی غَایَةِ الِانْتِهَاءِ وَ صَیُّورِ الْفَنَاءِ.

Certainly this world is a dirty watering place and a muddy source of drinking. Its appearance is attractive and its inside is destructive. It is a changeable deception, a vanishing reflection and a bent pillar. When its despiser begins to like it and he who is not acquainted with it feels satisfied with it, then it raises and puts down its feet (in joy), entraps him in its trap, makes him the target of its arrows and puts round his neck the rope of death taking him to the narrow grave and fearful abode in order to show him his place of stay and the recompense of his acts. This goes on from generation to generation. Neither death stops from cutting them asunder nor do the survivors keep aloof from committing of sins. They are emulating each other and proceeding in groups towards the final objective and the rendezvous of death

== Significance of the sermon ==
The Sermon of al-Gharra is one of Imam Ali's long sermons and has attracted the attention of commentators and men of letters throughout history because of its eloquence, rhetoric, and content. The sermon has also been the subject of studies examining its themes and purpose.

== See also ==
- Nahj al-Balagha
- The Sermon of al-Qāsi'a
- The pious sermon
- Ali ibn Abi Talib
- Islamic ethics
- List of Shia books
