= The Sermon of al-Qāsi'a =

The Sermon of al-Qāṣiʿa is the longest sermon in Nahj al-Balagha. In this sermon, Ali ibn Abi Talib mainly speaks against moral faults such as prejudice, pride, and arrogance. He also urges people to learn from what happened to Satan and not follow him.

== The reason for the name al-Qāsiʿa ==
There are several explanations for the name al-Qāṣiʿa:

Commentators on Nahj al-Balagha say the name refers to a camel that brings its food back into its mouth, because the warnings and advice in the sermon are repeated from beginning to end. Another says the name refers to the way the sermon humiliates Satan and his followers.

The name al-Qāṣiʿa comes from a word meaning "to humiliate," because in this sermon, Ali humiliated the arrogant.

"Qasaʿa" means "to remove" in Arabic. In this case, "al-Qāṣiʿa" means "the one that removes," because this sermon can remove the pride of an arrogant person.

== Circumstances of the Sermon ==
Arab tribal prejudice was the reason Ali ibn Abi Talib gave this sermon. Kufa was made up of different tribes, and each tribe considered itself better than the others. It was enough for someone from one tribe to enter another tribe's area and have a disagreement with someone there. One of them would then shout, for example, "O tribe of Nakhaʿ!" and call for help from his tribe. Several members of the tribe would come to help him and beat the other person. He would then return to his own tribe and ask for help. In this way, the tribes would draw their swords against each other, leading to the deaths of many people. Ali gave this sermon to prevent such conflicts and unrest.

== Part of the sermon ==
Ali ibn Abi Talib says the following in part of this sermon:

فَاعْتَبِروا بِمَا كَانَ مِنْ فِعْلِ اللهِ بِإِبْلِيسَ، إِذْ أَحْبَطَ عَمَلَهُ الطَّوِيلَ، وَجَهْدَهُ الْجَهِيدَ، وَكَانَ قَدْ عَبَدَ اللهَ سِتَّةَ آلاَفِ سَنَة، لاَ يُدْرَى أمِنْ سِنِي الدُّنْيَا أَمْ مِنْ سِنِي الاْخِرَةِ، عَنْ كِبْرِ سَاعَة وَاحِدَة. فَمَنْ بَعْدَ إِبْلِيسَ يَسْلَمُ عَلَى اللهِ بِمِثْلِ مَعْصِيَتِهِ؟ كَلاَّ، مَا كَانَ اللهُ سُبْحَانَهُ لِيُدْخِلَ الْجَنَّةَ بَشَراً بِأَمْر أَخْرَجَ بِهِ مِنْهَا مَلَكاً، إِنَّ حُكْمَهُ فِي أَهْلِ السَّماءِ وأَهْلِ الاْرْضِ لَوَاحِدٌ، وَمَا بَيْنَ اللهِ وَبَيْنَ أَحَد مِنْ خَلْقِهِ هَوَادَةٌ فِي إِبَاحَةِ حِمىً حَرَّمَهُ عَلَى الْعَالَمينَ.فَاحْذَرُوا عَدُوَّ اللهِ أَنْ يُعْدِيَكُمْ بِدَائِهِ، وَأَنْ يَسْتَفِزَّكُمْ [بِنِدَائِهِ، وَأَنْ يُجْلِبَ عَلَيْكُمْ] بِخَيْلِهِ وَرَجِلِهِ. فَلَعَمْرِي لَقَدْ فَوَّقَ لَكُمْ سَهْمَ الْوَعِيدِ، وَأَغْرَقَ لَكُم بِالنَّزْعِ الشَّدِيدِ، وَرَمَاكُمْ مِنْ مَكَان قَرِيب، و (قَالَ رَبِّ بِمَا أَغْوَيْتَنِي لاَزَيِّنَنَّ لَهُمْ فِي الاْرْضِ وَلاَغْوِيَنَّهُمْ أَجْمَعِينَ)

You should take a lesson from what Allah did with Satan; namely He nullified his great acts and extensive efforts on account of the vanity of one moment, although Satan had worshipped Allah for six thousand years - whether by the reckoning of this world or of the next world is not known. Who now can remain safe from Allah after Satan by committing a similar disobedience? None at all.

Allah, the Glorified, cannot let a human being enter Paradise if he does the same thing for which Allah turned out from it an angel. His command for the inhabitants in the sky and of the earth is the same. There is no friendship between Allah and any individual out of His creation so as to give him license for an undesirable thing which He has held unlawful for all the worlds.

Therefore, you should fear lest the enemy of Allah (Satan) infects you with his disease, or 'leads you astray through his call, or marches on you with his horsemen and footmen', (ref. 17:64) because, by my life, he has put the menacing arrow in the bow for you, has stretched the bow strongly, and has aimed at you from a nearby position, and: He (Satan) said: "My Lord! Because Thou hast left me to stray, certainly will I adorn unto them the path of error, and certainly will I cause them all to go astray." (Qur'an, 15:39)

== See also ==
- Nahj al-Balagha
- Ali ibn Abi Talib
- List of Shia books
