= Mahmoud M. Ayoub =

Lebanese scholar (1935–2021)

- محمود مصطفى أيوب
- Born: 1 June 1935; Ain Qana, French Lebanon
- Died: 31 October 2021 (aged 86)
- Occupations: Professor, writer, board member
- Board member of: Editorial Board, Journal, Islam and Christian Muslim Relations.
- Awards: Kent Doctoral Fellowship; Canada Council Fellowship; Fulbright Exchange of Scholars program for Malaysia (1994 – 1995).; Fulbright Exchange of Scholars program for Egypt and Lebanon (2000).; Fulbright Senior Specialists Program for Malaysia (2003).

Academic background
- Education: Harvard University, History of Religion, (Ph.D. 1975): University of Pennsylvania, Religious Thought, (M.A. 1966); American University of Beirut, Lebanon, Philosophy, (B.A. 1964)
- Thesis: Redemptive Suffering in Islam: A Study of the Devotional Aspects of ‘Ashura’ in Twelver Shi’ism (1975)
- Doctoral advisor: Annemarie Schimmel

Academic work
- Discipline: Professor of Islamic Studies
- Sub-discipline: Christian-Muslim Relations
- Institutions: Editorial Consultant, The Oxford Dictionary of Islam, Oxford University Press.; Visiting Professor, University of Balamand, Tripoli, Lebanon; Research Fellow, Middle East Center, University of Pennsylvania, Philadelphia, PA.; Editorial Consultant, The Muslim World journal, Hartford, CT.
- Main interests: Religious studies; Christian-Islamic relations

Mahmoud Mustafa Ayoub (June 1, 1935 – October 31, 2021) was a Lebanese Islamic scholar and professor of religious and inter-faith studies.

== Early life ==
Mahmoud Ayoub was born into a devout Muslim family on June 1, 1935, at Ain Qana (South Lebanon), a small town with an integrated religious population. His upbringing was socially integrated with events and people from both the Islamic and Christian religious faiths. Mahmoud Ayoub attended a British Presbyterian missionary school for the blind as a child. He described his experience in that school, noting that "the school authorities did not really have an educational program for us, what they wanted to do mainly was to make us Christians, and of course they did, and that created a lot of tension between me and my family, particularly my father." He would later join an American Southern Baptist Church seeking a more zealous approach of reaching others with the Gospel. During his university studies, he would eventually revert to Islam.

== Education ==
After receiving a Bachelor of Arts in philosophy from the American University of Beirut in 1964, he moved to America to complete a Master of Arts in religious thought from the University of Pennsylvania in 1966 and then a doctorate in history of religion from Harvard University in 1975. It was during his studies he resolved to return to Islam as his mother and father had wished for.

== Career ==
Mahmoud Ayoub was the faculty associate of Shi’ite Islam and Christian-Muslim relations and co-director at the Duncan Black MacDonald Center for the Study of Islam and Christian-Muslim relations for Hartford Seminary at Georgetown University.

From 1988 to 2008, he was professor and director of Islamic studies at the Department of Religion at Temple University in Philadelphia, an adjunct professor at Hartford Seminary in Connecticut, a research fellow at the Middle East Center at the University of Pennsylvania and a Tolson visiting professor at the Pacific School of Religion at Berkeley University.

In 1998, Mahmoud Ayoub helped develop and start a graduate Master of Arts-level program in Muslim-Christian relations and comparative religion for the Centre for Christian-Muslim Studies at the University of Balamand in Lebanon. Ayoub has also taught at San Diego State University, the University of Toronto and McGill University.

== Published works ==
Mahmoud Ayoub is the author of various books and publications, some of which are:

- Redemptive Suffering in Islam: A Study of the Devotional Aspects of Ashura in Twelver Shi'ism. Religion and Society. Vol. 10. De Gruyter. 1978. ISBN 978-9027979438.
- The Qur'an and Its Interpreters - Volume I. State University of New York Press. 1984. ISBN 978-0791465226.
- The Qur'an and Its Interpreters - Volume II. State University of New York Press. 1992. ISBN 978-0791409947.
- Islam: Faith and History. Oneworld Publications. 2005. ISBN 978-1851683482.
- Irfan Omar, ed. (2007). A Muslim View of Christianity: Essays on Dialogue By Mahmoud Ayoub. Faith Meets Faith. Orbis Books. ISBN 978-1570756900.
- The Crisis of Muslim History. Oneworld Publications EPZ. 2014. ISBN 978-1851683260.

== Theological position ==
Mahmoud Ayoub promotes a moderate interpretation and understanding of Islamic theology.

In a 2006 article about Muslim cab drivers and their adherence to the various religious rules and keeping the letter of the laws of Islam, when speaking to cab drivers transporting customers having alcoholic products, Ayoub is quoted saying "I know many Muslims who own gas stations [alcohol is prohibited in Islam] and sell ham sandwiches [pork is prohibited in Islam]. They justify it and I think rightly so; that they have to make a living."

In 2013 when responding to questions about ISIS/ISIL, Ayoub dismissed them as contrary to Islam, stating that extremism has always been a problem in the religion, noting that Islam is unique among faiths in that it was founded as both a religion and a state. Mahmoud clarified the ideal dynamic would be a balance between the two with the state remaining in ultimate control. He further stated that from Islam's earliest beginnings, some have challenged that balance and sought to impose brutal theocracies, citing one group early in Islamic history that acted much like ISIS, trying to found a theocracy and killing all those who resisted or disagreed with it. "My view is the action of ISIS is not unique. Extremism appears in every epoch of Islam."

At a lecture in 2013 at Oakwood University in Huntsville, Alabama, Ayoub said at the heart of the Islamic moral system is love, the basis for peace. In quoting a passage from the Hadith (collected sayings of Muhammad): "No one of you will be a true believer until he loves for his brother what he loves for himself."

In a 2014 article in The Jewish Exponent regarding religious observations, Ayoub's words are quoted “Repentance may be regarded as the cornerstone of religious life of both the individual and society.”

As per his interpretation of the hadith, "Jihad may be regarded as a sixth fundamental obligation (faridah) incumbent on every Muslim when social and religious reform is gravely hampered or the community's integrity is threatened. In a situation where the entire Muslim ummah is in danger, jihad becomes an absolute obligation (fard 'ayn). Otherwise it is a limited obligation (fard kifayah), incumbent upon those who are directly involved. These rules apply to armed struggle, or the jihad of the sword."

== In the media ==
In 2009 Mahmoud Ayoub voiced his opinion regarding the idea of a U.S. Muslim college, believing Muslims are better off attending established American schools, saying U.S. Muslims badly need a seminary since there are none in the country: "I don't know that I would send my child to go to a college where they can only learn tradition. Young people have to live, I like mixing people. I don't like ghettos."

On 24 March 2015, the Peace Islands Institute brought together Mahmoud M. Ayoub and Neset Ulusal of Quinnipiac University for a discussion entitled "Muslim Voices Against Extremism".

In a 2015 article Mahmoud Ayoub's work was mentioned as helping develop a scholarly approach to inter-faith relations between Islam and Christianity.

In 2016 Ayoub was mentioned being the “driving force behind establishing the chair and raising money for it” regarding the first academic chair in North America dedicated to Shi’i studies at Hartford to help complement and contrast dialogue balancing the predominant Sunni view of Islamic thought.

== Controversy ==
In 2008, Mahmoud Ayoub was instrumental in persuading the International Institute of Islamic Thought (IIIT) to donate $1.5 million to the Temple University Seminary chair office. This effort was met with warnings from David Horowitz claiming that IIIT had funded terrorism and had terrorist ties. After the university seemed unable to publicly respond with an open acceptance or rejection of the donation, the IIIT withdrew its offer in December of that year. Although IIIT had been investigated by the Federal Bureau of Investigation and the Department of Homeland Security after the domestic terrorist attacks on 11 September 2001, no charges were brought against their organization.

== Awards ==
In 2012, Mahmoud Ayoub received the Distinguished Scholar Award from the International Institute of Islamic Thought (IIIT).

Mahmoud has received a Kent Doctoral Fellowship, a Fulbright scholarship and a Canada Council Fellowship.

== Death ==
Mahmoud M. Ayoub died in Montreal, where he lived for the past several years, on 31 October 2021.
