= Ibn Abi'l-Hadid =

13th-century Muslim scholar

Abu Hamid Abd al-Hamid ibn Hibat-Allah ibn Abi al-Hadid al Mutazili al-Mada'ini
- Title: Glory of the Dīn (Izz al-Dīn) ابو حامد عز الدین

Personal life
- Born: عبدالحمید بن ابی الحُسین ھبۃ اللہ بن محمد بن محمد بن الحُسین بن ابی الحَدِید المَدائنی; 30 December 1190 Al-Mada'in, Ctesiphon, now Salman Pak, Baghdad Governorate, Iraq
- Died: June, 1258 (aged 70)
- Region: Baghdad, Madain
- Main interest(s): History, Hadith
- Notable work: Sharḥ Nahj al-Balāgha

Religious life
- Religion: Islam
- Denomination: Shia
- Jurisprudence: Shafi'i
- Creed: Mu'tazili

Muslim leader
- Influenced by: Abu'l-Khayr Musaddiq ibn Shabib al-Wasiti

‘Izz al-Dīn ‘Abu Hamīd ‘Abd al-Hamīd bin Hībat-Allah ibn Abi al-Hadīd al Mutazilī al-Mada'ini (Arabic: أبو حامد عز الدین عبدالحمید بن أبي الحُسین ھبة الله بن محمد بن محمد بن الحُسین بن أبي الحَدِید المَدائني المعتزلي), also known as Ibn abi'l-Hadid (30 December 1190 – June 1258; 586–656 AH), was a Shi'i Mutazili Shafi'i scholar and writer during the Middle Ages. He studied under Abu'l-Khayr Musaddiq ibn Shabib al-Wasiti (died AD 1208/605 AH) and is best known for his commentary on the Nahj al-Balagha, which he titled Sharh Nahj al-Balagha.

== Birth ==
Ibn Abi'l-Hadid was born on Sunday, 1st Zulhijja, 586 AH/ 30 December 1190 AD in the city of al-Mada'in, now Salman Pak, Baghdad Governorate, Iraq.

== Views ==
Regarding the fabrications of Hadiths, he said that lies had been introduced into the hadith collections of Shias in order to favour their Imam, Ali, or due to their enmity with other religious groups. Regarding the early Caliphate, Al-Hadid explains Ali's position during the early Caliphates in his commentary in his Sharh Nahjul Balagha. According to him Ali did not approve of the Rashidun Caliphate and did not follow them in prayers. He further states that he follows the example of Ali and does not go beyond that, going as far as to curse Muaawiyah.

== Works ==
- Comments on the Peak of Eloquence (Arabic: شرح نهج البلاغة, romanized: Sharḥ Nahj al-Balāghah); a commentary on the Nahj al-Balagha, a collection of traditions attributed to Ali ibn Abi Talib. A 20-volume edition was published by Muhammad Abu l-Fadl Ibrahim (Cairo: 'Isa al-Babi al-Halabi) between 1959 and 1964.

== See also ==
- List of Islamic scholars
