= Sermon of the Pious (Khutbat al-Muttaqin) =

The Pious Sermon, also known as the Sermon of Hammam, is a sermon that Ali ibn Abi Talib gave in response to a request from a man named "Hammam ibn Shurayh" to describe the qualities and characteristics of the pious.

== Reason for the Sermon ==
One day, Hammam ibn Shurayh asked Ali, the first Imam of the Shi'a, to describe the qualities and characteristics of the pious. Considering Hammam's ability to understand it, Ali ibn Abi Talib decided not to give the sermon and only recited a verse from the Quran from Surah al-Nahl. But Hammam insisted and made him swear. Finally, Ali delivered the sermon for him.

Sayyid al-Razi describes Hammam's request to Ali in the book Nahj al-Balagha as follows:

رُوِیَ أَنَّ صَاحِباً لِأَمِیرِ الْمُؤْمِنِینَ (علیه السلام) یُقَالُ لَهُ هَمَّامٌ کَانَ رَجُلًا عَابِداً فَقَالَ لَهُ یَا أَمِیرَ الْمُؤْمِنِینَ صِفْ لِیَ الْمُتَّقِینَ حَتَّی کَأَنِّی أَنْظُرُ إِلَیْهِمْ فَتَثَاقَلَ (علیه السلام) عَنْ جَوَابِهِ ثُمَّ قَالَ یَا هَمَّامُ اتَّقِ اللَّهَ وَ أَحْسِنْ، فَ «إِنَّ اللَّهَ مَعَ الَّذِینَ اتَّقَوْا وَ الَّذِینَ هُمْ مُحْسِنُونَ». فَلَمْ یَقْنَعْ هَمَّامٌ بِهَذَا الْقَوْلِ حَتَّی عَزَمَ عَلَیْهِ. فَحَمِدَ اللَّهَ وَ أَثْنَی عَلَیْهِ وَ صَلَّی عَلَی النَّبِیِّ (صلی الله علیه وآله) ثُمَّ قَالَ (علیه السلام) ...

It is said that one of the Imam's pious companions, named Hammam, said: "O Commander of the Faithful, describe the pious to me in such a way that it is as if I can see them with my own eyes." The Imam paused before answering him and said, "O Hammam, fear God and do good, for God is with the pious and those who do good." But Hammam did not give up and kept insisting, until the Imam decided to describe the qualities of the pious. He then praised and thanked God and sent blessings upon His Prophet, and said ...

== Characteristics of the Pious ==
The qualities and characteristics of the pious in this sermon can be divided into two parts: "social qualities" and "personal qualities."

=== Social qualities ===
- Speaking well
- Moderation
- Humility
- Avoiding what is forbidden
- Listening to useful knowledge
- Eager to seek knowledge
- Patience in hardship
- Forgiving someone who has wronged them
- Avoiding bad words
- Not wasting what has been entrusted to them
- Controlling their anger
- Keeping people safe from their harm
- Hoping for good things from them

=== Personal qualities ===
- Distrusting oneself
- Fear of being praised by others
- Faith with certainty
- Patience
- Hope for the things of the hereafter and not expecting anything from this world

== Part of the sermon ==
Ali ibn Abi Talib says in part of this sermon:

... فَالْمُتَّقُونَ فِیهَا هُمْ أَهْلُ الْفَضَائِلِ مَنْطِقُهُمُ الصَّوَابُ وَ مَلْبَسُهُمُ الِاقْتِصَادُ وَ مَشْیُهُمُ التَّوَاضُعُ غَضُّوا أَبْصَارَهُمْ عَمَّا حَرَّمَ اللَّهُ عَلَیْهِمْ وَ وَقَفُوا أَسْمَاعَهُمْ عَلَی الْعِلْمِ النَّافِعِ لَهُمْ نُزِّلَتْ أَنْفُسُهُمْ مِنْهُمْ فِی الْبَلَاءِ کَالَّتِی نُزِّلَتْ فِی الرَّخَاءِ وَ لَوْ لَا الْأَجَلُ الَّذِی کَتَبَ اللَّهُ عَلَیْهِمْ لَمْ تَسْتَقِرَّ أَرْوَاحُهُمْ فِی أَجْسَادِهِمْ طَرْفَةَ عَیْنٍ …

So the pious are people of virtue in this world. Their speech is right, and they are moderate in their ways. They are humble in their behavior and speech. They keep their eyes away from what God has forbidden them, and they listen to knowledge that benefits them. They live through hardship as if they were in comfort. If they did not have a set time to live...(Translated by: Seyyed Jafar Shahidi)

== Significance of the Sermon ==
The significance of this sermon is such that, even about 1,400 years after it was delivered, it has been repeatedly studied, interpreted, and examined, and has also been the subject of several books, articles, and theses.

== See also ==
- Nahj al-Balagha
- Ali ibn Abi Talib
- The Sermon of al-Qāsi'a
- Shaqshaqiya sermon
- List of Shia books
