= Husain Mohammad Jafri =

Pakistani historian (died 2019)

Syed Husain Mohammad Jafri was a Pakistani historian. He obtained two doctoral degrees in history, the first from the University of Lucknow, and the other from the University of London. He joined Pakistan Study Centre, at the University of Karachi as its founding director in 1983, from where he retired in 1998. He died in January 2019. He was the author of The Origins and Early Development of Shi'a Islam.
