= Arba'in =

Shia religious observance

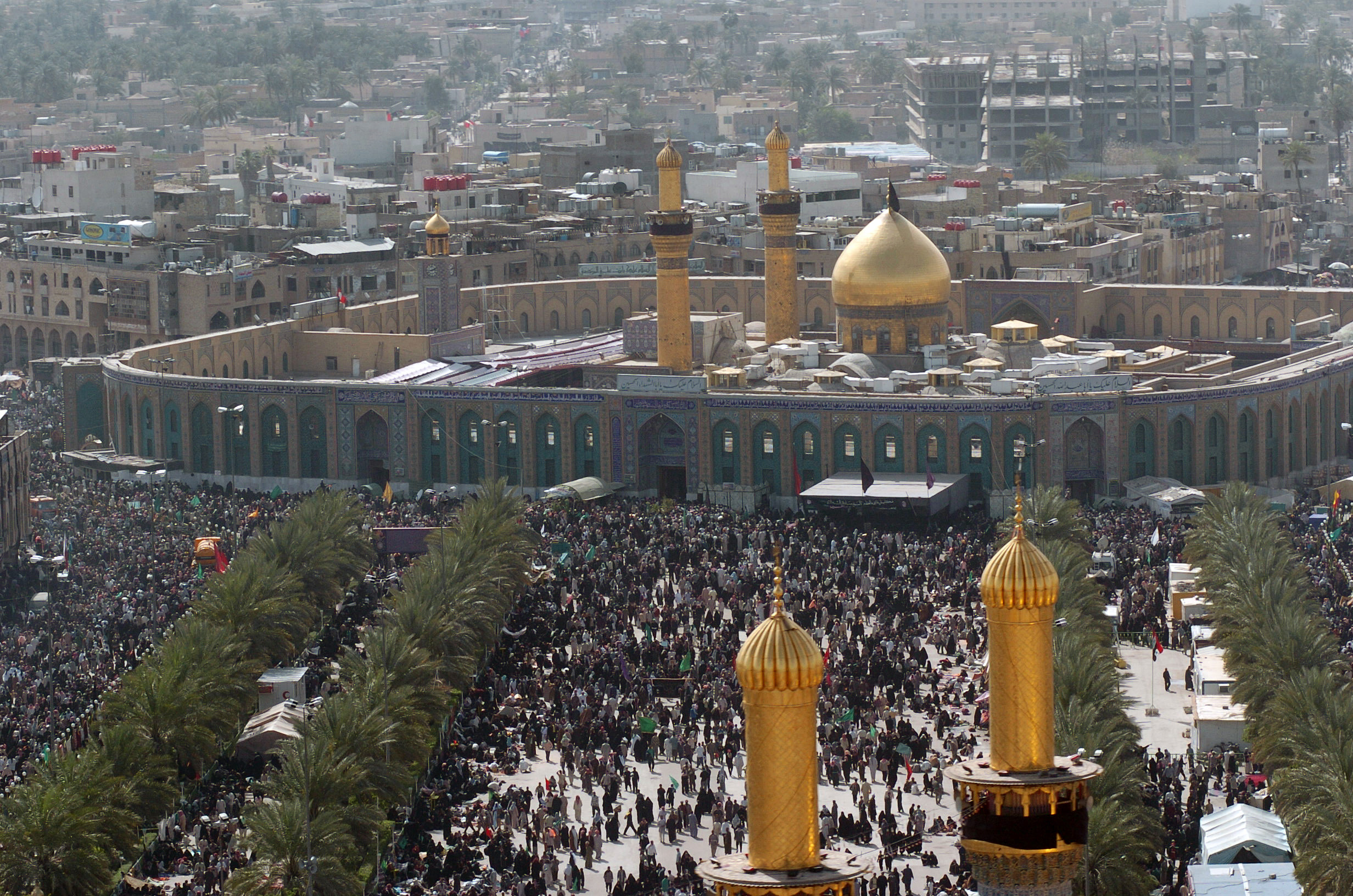
- Congregation of worshippers on Arba'in in the shrine of Husayn ibn Ali, Karbala, Iraq
- Also called: Other languages: Azerbaijani: İmamın Qırxı; Bengali: চল্লিশা, romanized: Chôlliśā; Kurdish: Çilroj; Persian: چهلم, romanized: Chehelom; Sindhi: چاليهو, romanized: Chālīho; Turkish: Erbain; Urdu: چالیسواں, romanized: Chālīsvān
- Observed by: Shia Muslims
- Type: Islamic
- Significance: Forty days after Ashura, the death anniversary of Husayn ibn Ali, grandson of the Islamic prophet Muhammad and the third Shia imam
- Observances: Pilgrimage to the shrine of Husayn ibn Ali in Karbala
- Date: 20 Safar
- Frequency: annual (Islamic year)

In Shia Islam, Arba'in (Arabic: الأربعين, lit. 'fortieth'), also spelled Arba'een, marks forty days after Ashura, which is the martyrdom anniversary of Husayn ibn Ali, grandson of the Islamic prophet Muhammad and the third Shia imam. Husayn was killed, alongside most of his relatives and his small retinue, in the Battle of Karbala on 10 Muharram 61 AH (680 CE) against the army of the Umayyad caliph Yazid ibn Mu'awiya (r. 680–683). The battle followed Husayn's refusal to pledge his allegiance to Yazid, who is often portrayed by Muslim historians as impious and immoral. In Shia Islam, Karbala symbolizes the eternal struggle between good and evil, the pinnacle of self-sacrifice, and the ultimate sabotage of Muhammad's prophetic mission.

Arba'in coincides with the twentieth of Safar, the second month of the Islamic calendar, and its commemoration is rooted in early Islamic funerary traditions. Shia Muslims annually observe the day through mourning gatherings, dramatic reenactments of Karbala narratives, and charitable acts. Arba'in is also a day of pilgrimage to the shrine of Husayn in Karbala, Iraq. Pilgrims arrive there in large numbers, often on foot, and many from the city of Najaf, some eighty kilometers away, home to the shrine of Ali ibn Abi Talib, the first Shia imam. The Arba'in pilgrimage, banned under the Iraqi president Saddam Hussein, has grown after his deposal in 2003 from two million participants in that year to around twenty million in 2014. As with Ashura, Arba'in can be an occasion for violence against Shia Muslims.

== Significance in Shia Islam ==
In the Islamic calendar, twentieth of Safar, known as Arba'in (also spelled Arba'een), marks forty days after Ashura, tenth of Muharram. In turn, Ashura is the death anniversary of Husayn ibn Ali, grandson of the Islamic prophet Muhammad and the third Shia imam. Husayn, alongside most of his male relatives and his small retinue, were killed on 10 Muharram 61 AH (10 October 680 CE) in the Battle of Karbala against the army of the Umayyad caliph Yazid ibn Mu'awiya (r. 680–683), having been surrounded for some days and deprived of the drinking water of the nearby Euphrates river. After the battle, the women and children in Husayn's camp were taken prisoner and marched to the Umayyad capital Damascus in Syria. The battle followed failed negotiations and Husayn's refusal to pledge his allegiance to Yazid, who is often portrayed by Muslim historians as impious and immoral. The fight took place in the desert land of Karbala, en route to the nearby Kufa, whose residents had invited Husayn to lead them against Yazid.

In Shia Islam, Karbala symbolizes the eternal struggle between good and evil, the pinnacle of self-sacrifice, and the ultimate sabotage of Muhammad's prophetic mission. Historically, the event served to crystallize the Shia community into a distinct sect and remains an integral part of their religious identity to date. Ashura to Arba'in is thus a period of mourning for Shia Muslims, particularly the first ten days of Muharram and Arba'in. On the one hand, Shia mourners hope to share in the pain of Husayn to benefit from his intercession on the Day of Judgement. On the other hand, the Shia view mourning for Husayn as an act of protest against oppression, and as such a struggle for God (jihad).

== Arba'in in Shia tradition ==
Forty is a sacred number in Islam, and commemorating the dead forty days after their death is a long-standing Islamic tradition, dating back to the early Islamic period. On the one hand, the fortieth (arba'in, chehellom) signifies the maturation of the soul of a deceased believer. It is thus said that Cain learned on the fortieth of Abel to dispose of his body by burying him, that the ascension of Jesus took place on his fortieth, and that the gates of heaven open for a righteous person forty days after their death. On the other hand, the fortieth marks the end of the period of grief in Islamic tradition. It is thus said that Heaven grieves the death of a righteous person for forty days, that Fatima mourned for forty days the death of her father, the Islamic prophet Muhammad, and that son wept for forty days for John the Baptist, whose head was cut off and placed on a dish.

In Shia Islam, similar traditions are linked to Arba'in, the fortieth of Husayn. Thus the earth and skies are said to have wept for Husayn for forty days after his death, and the sun became unusually red in that period at dawn and dusk. By some accounts, the body of Husayn, who was decapitated, was reunited with his head and buried in Karbala on Arba'in. Yet it is commonly thought that Husayn and his companions were buried by residents of nearby al-Ghadiriyya village when the Umayyad army left Karbala. Probably by combining the accounts available to him, the Shia scholar Ibn Tawus (d. 1266) reports another Karbala narrative, according to which Husayn's relatives chose to return via Karbala to their hometown of Medina when they were freed from captivity in Damascus. Upon arrival in Karbala on Arba'in, they met Jabir ibn Abd Allah (d. 697), a companion of Muhammad, who had learned about the death of Husayn through a divine sign. This story was repeated by many authors after Ibn Tawus, even though several scholars before Ibn Tawus report only the Arba'in pilgrimage of Jabir. The veracity of Ibn Tawus' account has therefore been questioned by some, including the Shia scholar Husain Noori Tabarsi (d. 1902) and the Islamicist Mahmoud M. Ayoub (d. 2021). Ayoub adds that Arba'in is not mentioned in Kamil al-ziyarat, an early and authoritative hadith collection by the Shia traditionist Ibn Qulawayh (d. c. 978). Whatever the case, such narratives may have helped establish Arba'in in Shia culture.

Risking the Umayyads' wrath, commemoration of Karbala was initially small and private. In particular, pilgrimage to Karbala remained limited and precarious in this period. Soon after the Umayyads fell, however, Shia imams worked to institutionalize the Ashura and Arba'in pilgrimages to the tomb of Husayn. This attempt is reflected in some of the traditions ascribed to the imams. For instance, the Shia imam Hasan al-Askari (d. c. 874) is reported to have listed the Arba'in pilgrimage among the five signs of a true believer.

== Arba'in pilgrimage ==
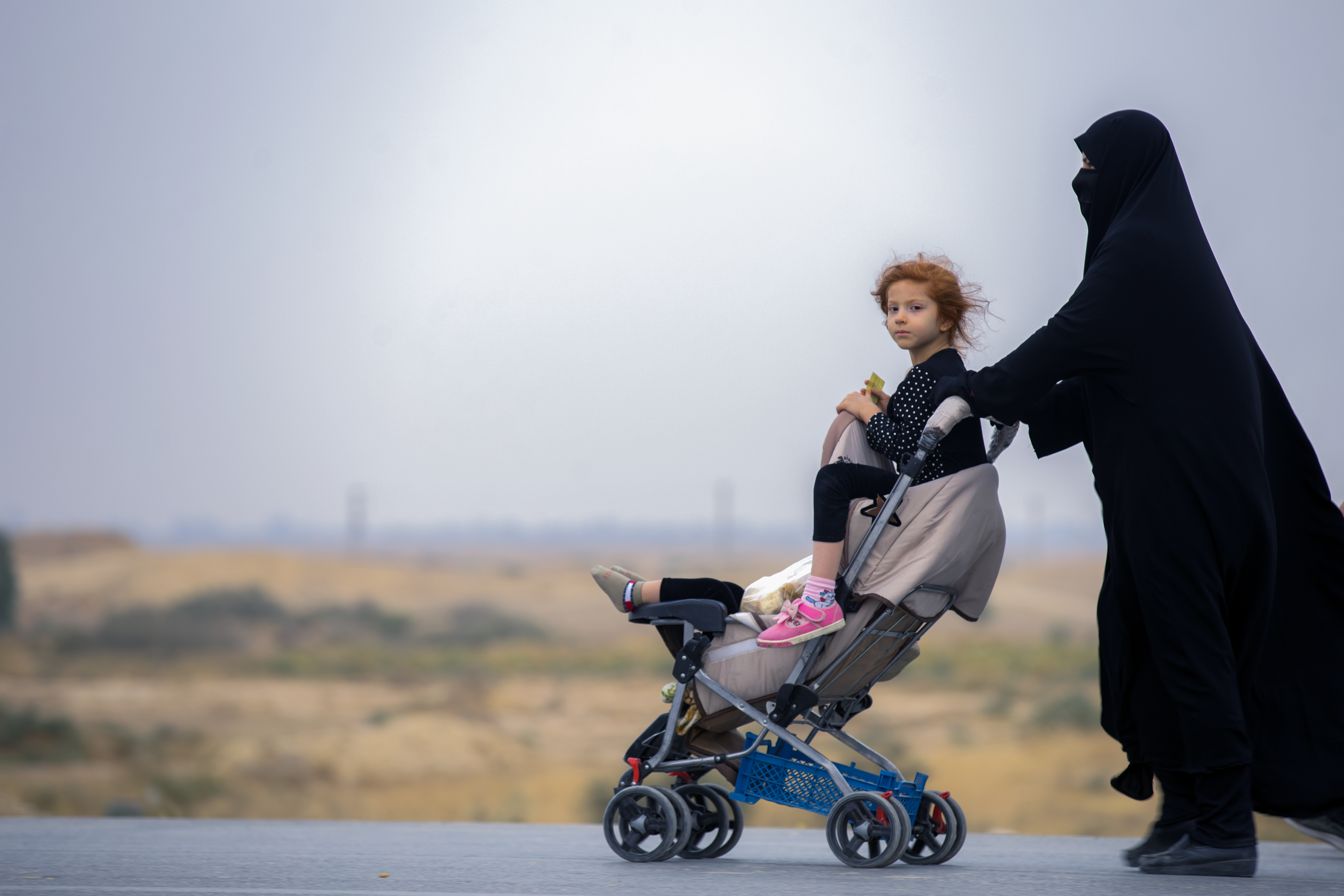
A family on the Arba'in walk in Mehran, Iran

Arba'in is a day of pilgrimage to the shrine of Husayn in Karbala, Iraq. Pilgrims arrive there in large numbers, often on foot. The most popular route is Najaf to Karbala, as many pilgrims first travel to Najaf and then walk from there to Karbala, some eighty kilometers away, which usually takes three days on foot. Along the way, volunteers provide the pilgrims with free meals and services. Indeed, some have considered generosity and hospitality to be the main features of the Arba'in pilgrimage. When they finally reach the shrine of Husayn in Karbala, pilgrims recite the ziyara of Arba'in, a supplication for this occasion. As with other Shia rituals of Karbala, the Arba'in pilgrimage was banned by the Iraqi president Saddam Hussein (r. 1979–2003), who favored the Sunni community there, and viewed large Shia rituals as a political threat. The pilgrimage was revived soon after the deposal of Saddam in 2003, with numbers growing from two million participants in that year to around twenty million in 2014. Arba'in is also commemorated through mourning gatherings, dramatic reenactments of Karbala narratives, and charitable acts. As with Ashura, Arba'in can be an occasion for Sunni violence against Shia Muslims.

== Arba'in in the Gregorian calendar ==
Arba'in, twentieth of Safar in the Islamic calendar, corresponds to a different day every year in the Gregorian calendar.

Islamic calendar	1447	1448	1449
Gregorian calendar	14 August 2025	3 August 2026	24 July 2027

== Al Mawakib ==
Al Mawakib (Arabic: المواكب, singular: mawkib) are volunteer-run service points set up along the routes to Karbala during the Arba'in pilgrimage. These stations—often tents or temporary roadside shelters—are funded and operated by individuals, families, religious groups, or local communities. They offer pilgrims free services such as meals, drinks, medical care, resting spaces, and occasionally lodging, all provided without charge.

The tradition of mawakeb is closely tied to the values of karam (generosity) and diyafa (hospitality), which are central to the pilgrimage. Volunteers treat every traveller like family, offering assistance with no expectation of payment—an expression of solidarity, compassion, and communal responsibility. This culture of giving is often cited by pilgrims as one of the most moving and memorable parts of their spiritual journey.

== Gallery ==
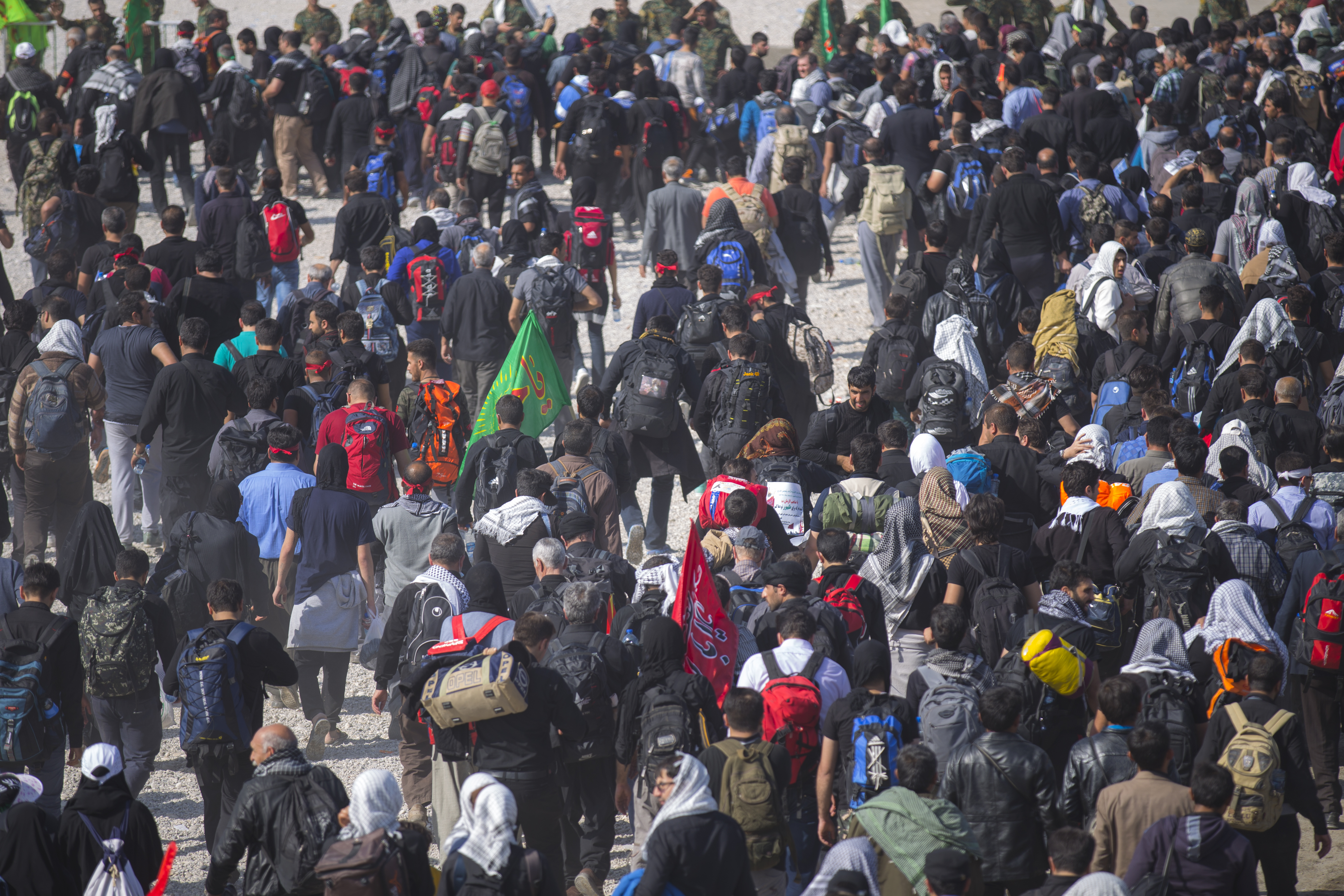
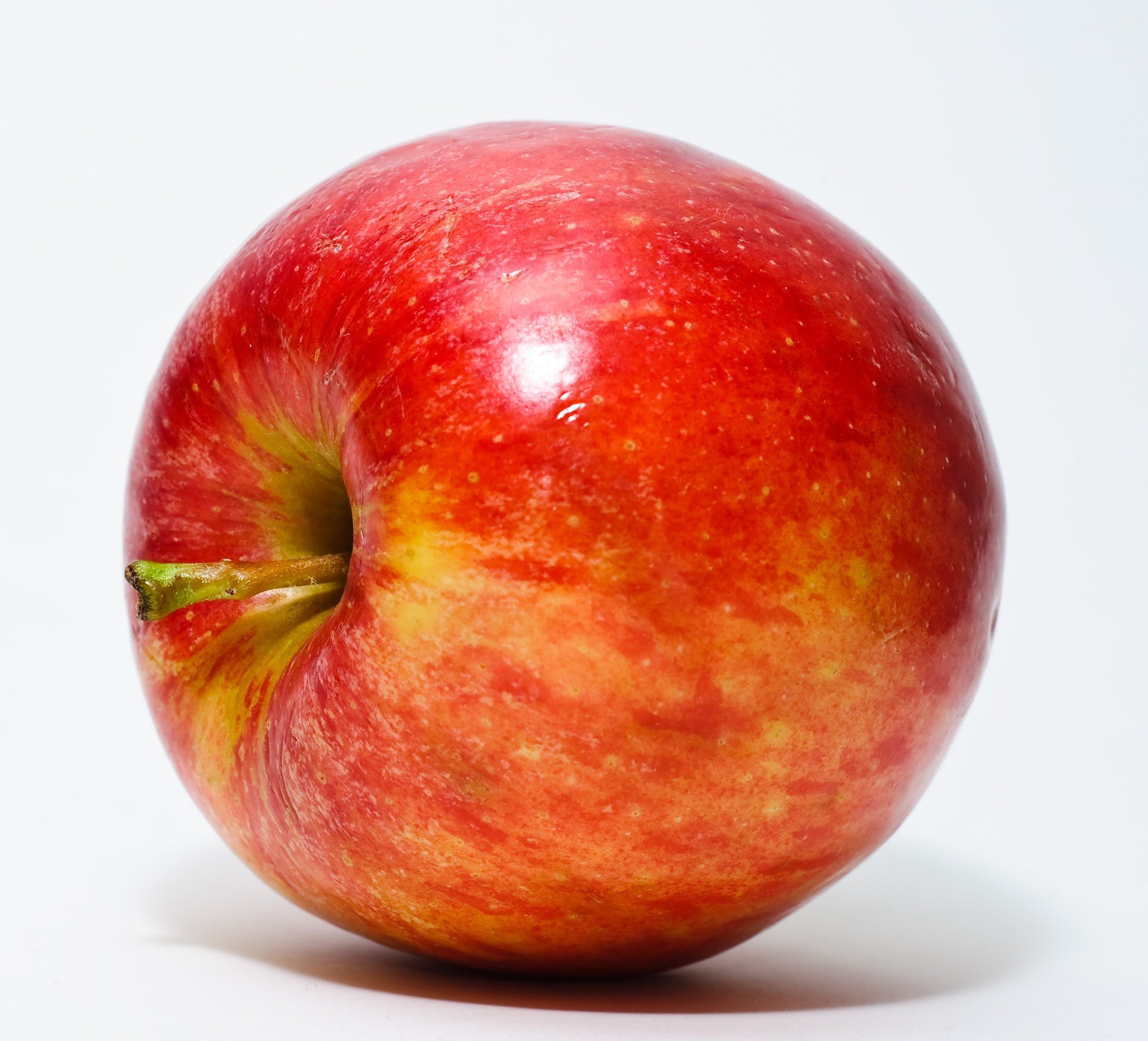
apple
Arba'in pilgrims

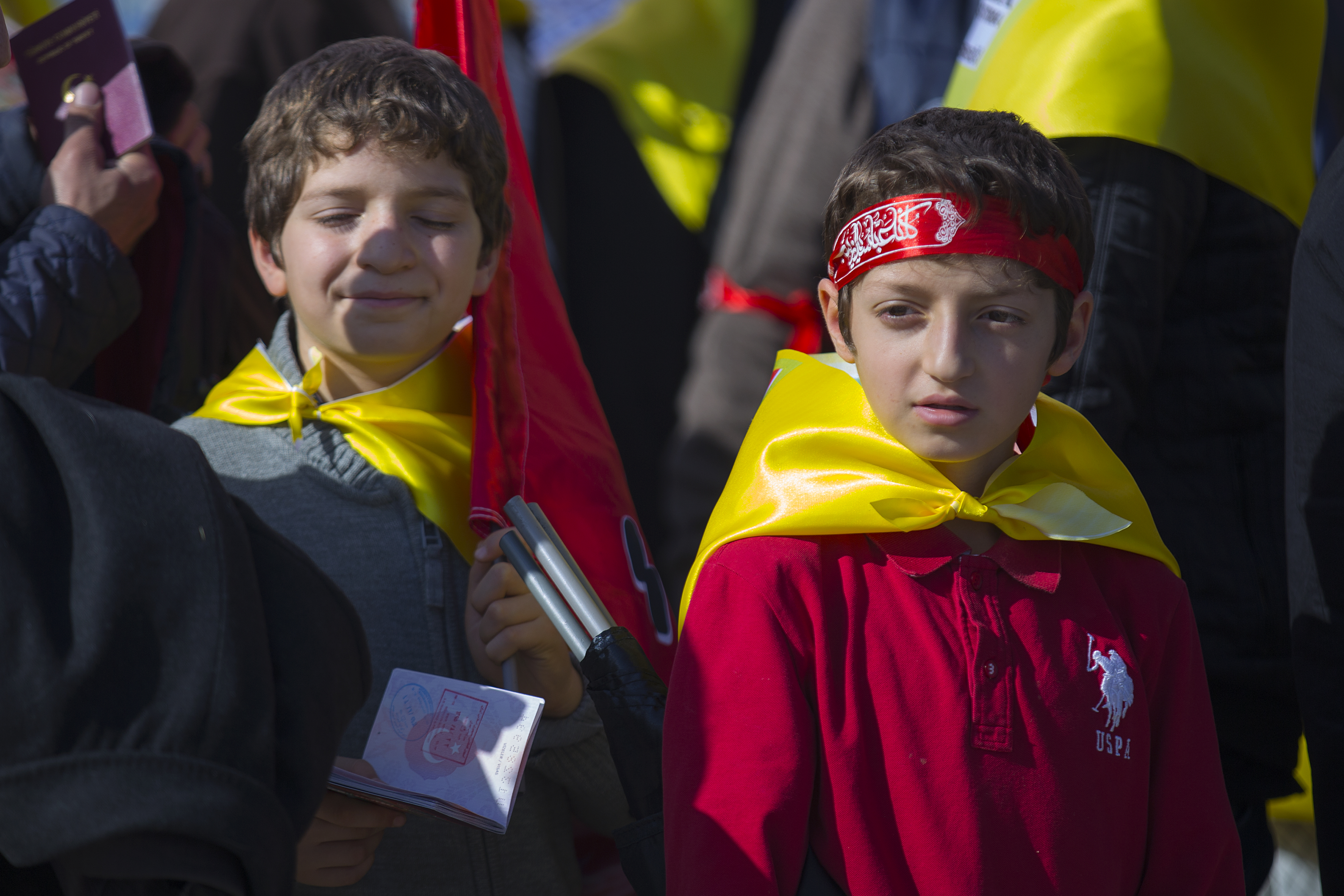

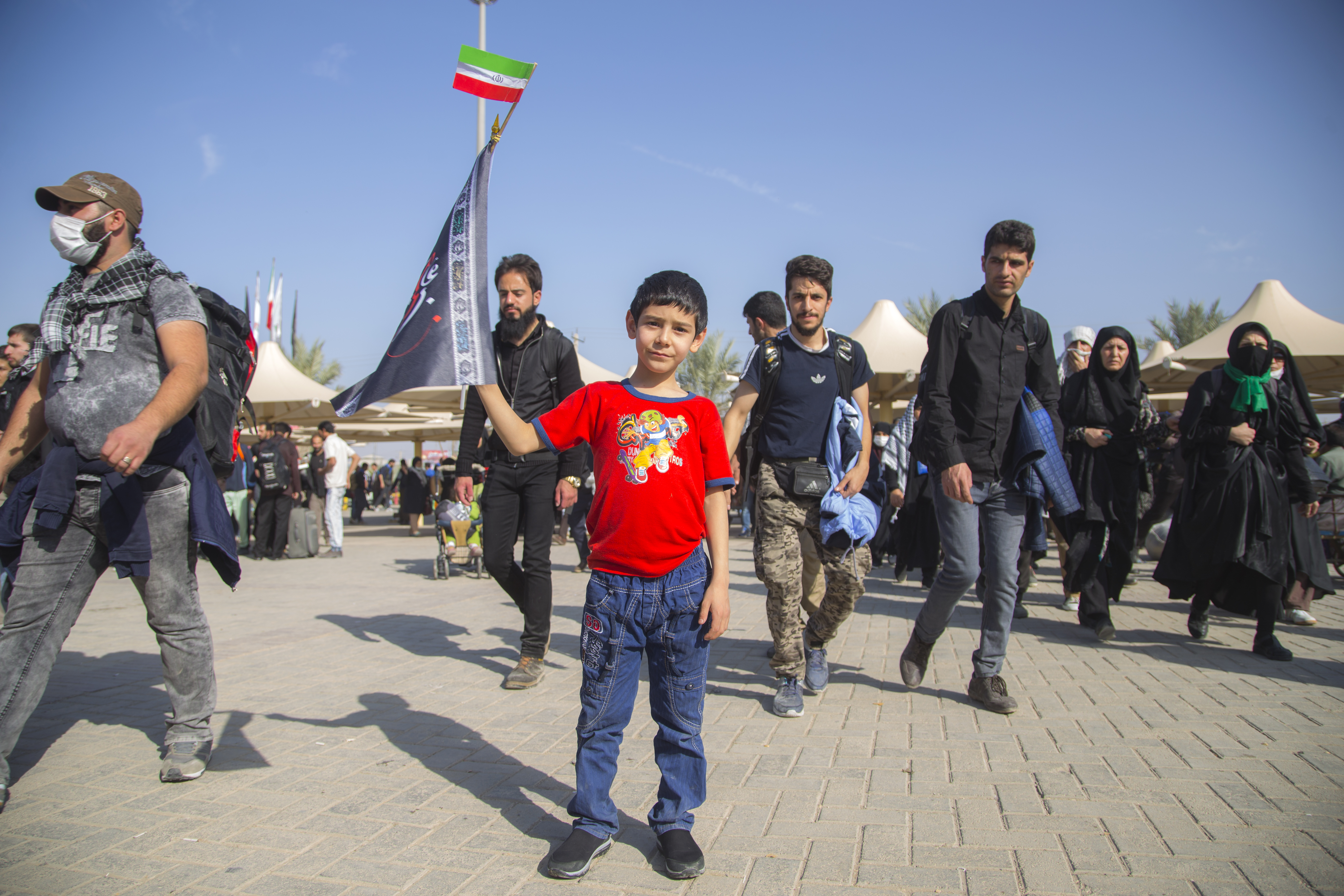

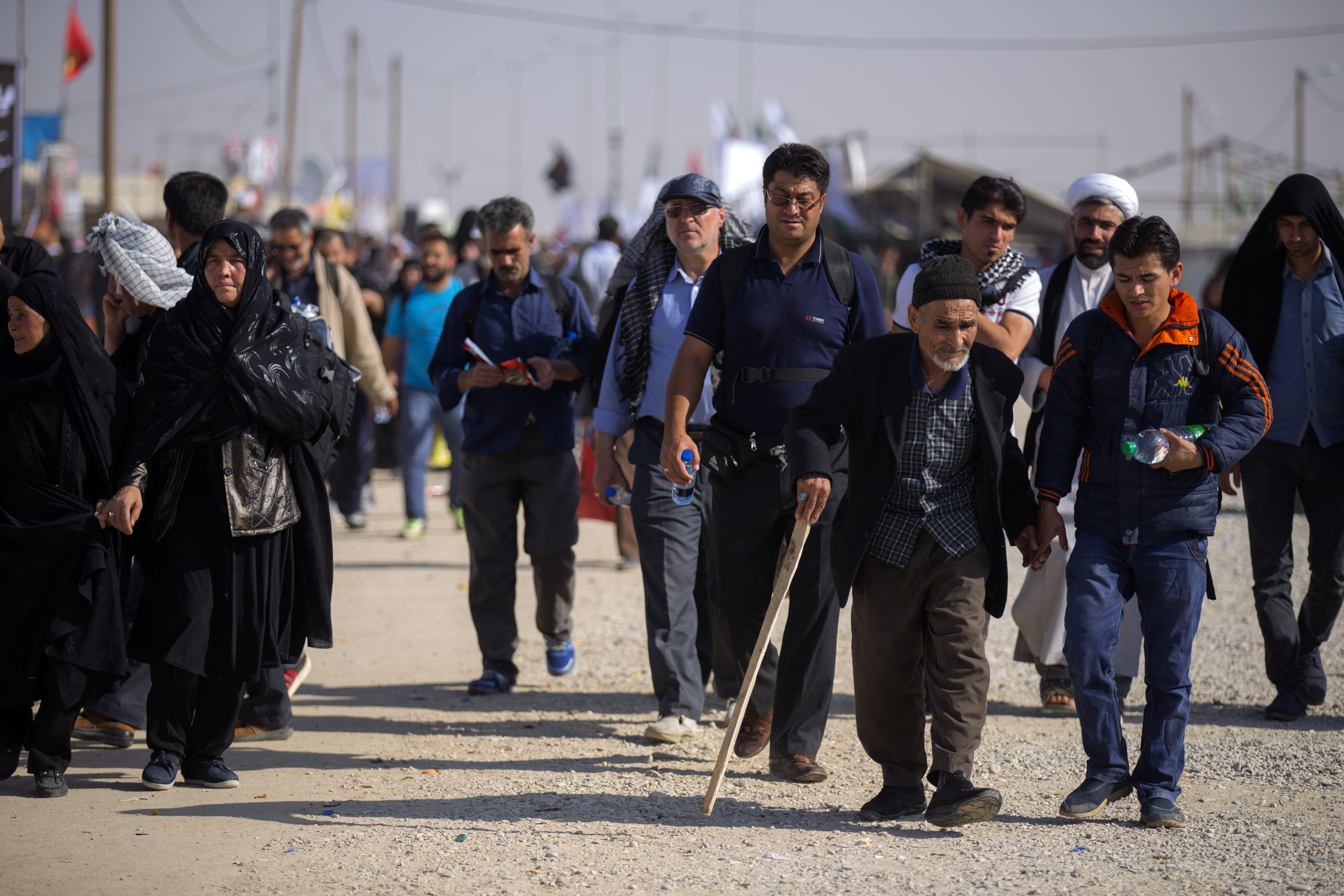

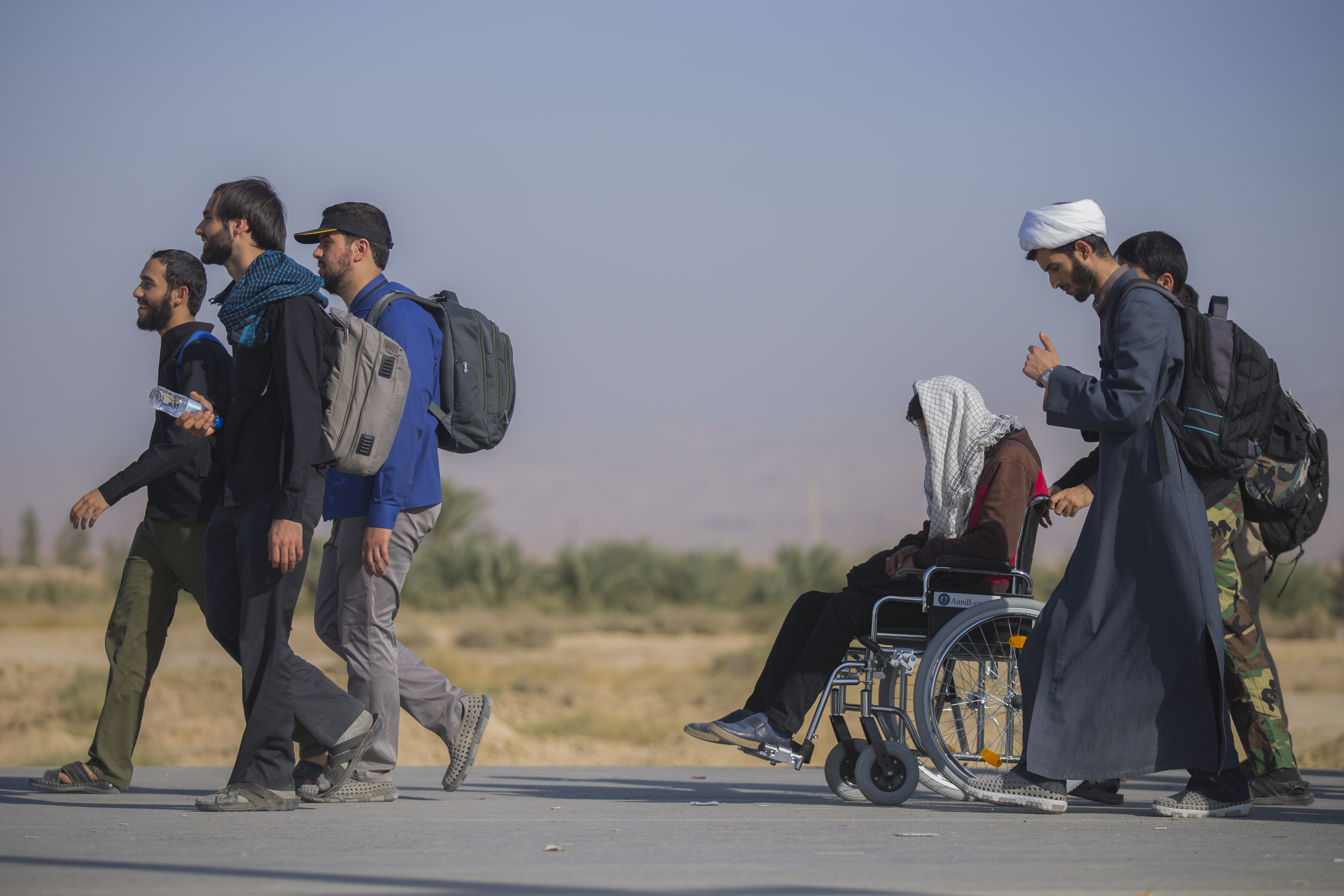

== See also ==
- Ashura
- Tasu'a
- List of largest peaceful gatherings in history
