= Awail Al Maqalat =

Book by Shaykh Mufid

Awail al Maqalat fi Madhahab al Mukhtarah or Principal theses of selected doctrines (Persian: اوائل المقالات), is a Shia doctrinal, theological book written by Shaykh Mufid.

== Author ==
Shaykh Mufid was a prominent Twelver Shi'a theologian. He was the son of Muallim, hence called Ibn Muallim. Taught by Al-Shaykh al-Saduq, Ibn Qulawayh, Abu Abdallah al-Basri and al-Rummani, Sharif al-Murtaza and al-Shaykh al-Tusi were among his students. Only 10 of his 200 works have survived which include Amali, Al-Irshad, Al-Muqni'ah, and Tashih al-Itiqadat.

== Content ==
Mufid tries to distinguish between Shia and Mutazilite by describing the principle creeds of Shia. According to Mufid, the principle belief of Shia is loyalty to Ali and repudiation of other caliphs, namely Osman, Abu Bakr and Omar. The relation between revelation and reason is emphasized, such that there is such a way that the former could help the latter. Contrary to Mutazilizm, who believed in a middle position for someone who is grave sinner, Mufid believed that he is, in spite of being grave sinner, a believer, and that a Shia person will not be punished because of his belief. However, he mentioned some conditions and principles for commanding rights, such as it being indispensable to instruct someone, and that it is known that it is useful and advantageous. Mufid explained the basic beliefs of the Twelver Shia through connecting with concepts such as the unity of God, justice, prophecy, the imam and the Return. but generally these subjects did not constitute the outline of Awail.

== Theological beliefs ==
Mufid believes that being a seer and hearer in case of God finally originated from God. However it is a necessary belief to believe in the presence of an infallible imam in the world as a central belief. According to him, using this reason leads to believing in unity. He also referred to some other attributes of God such as being living, powerful seer, hearer, knowing all things and yet not visible to the eye. Mufid believed in not assigning and names to God other than those which are mentioned in Quran and traditions. Mufid thought that people in next life, whilst not under moral obligation, are commanded in their minds to do what is appropriate. Mufid emphasized in the case of this rule that God's obligation does not originate from the Justice. He says:

"I say that the help which the proponents of the doctrine of lutf make incumbent upon God is so from His generosity and nobility. It is not – as they think- justice that obliges Him, so that He would be unjust were He not to give it."(Awa'il, p. 26.)

== See also ==
- Shia Islam
- Ja'fari jurisprudence
- Shaykh Mufid

== Bibliography ==
- Cook, Michael (2001). Commanding Right and Forbidding Wrong in Islamic Thought. Cambridge University Press. ISBN 978-0-521-13093-6.
- McDermott, Martin J. (1978). The Theology of Al-Shaikh Al-Mufīd. Dar el-Machreq éditeurs. ISBN 978-2-7214-5601-4.
