= Sharif al-Murtada Shrine =

Islamic shrine in Baghdad, Iraq

- مرقد الشريف المرتضى
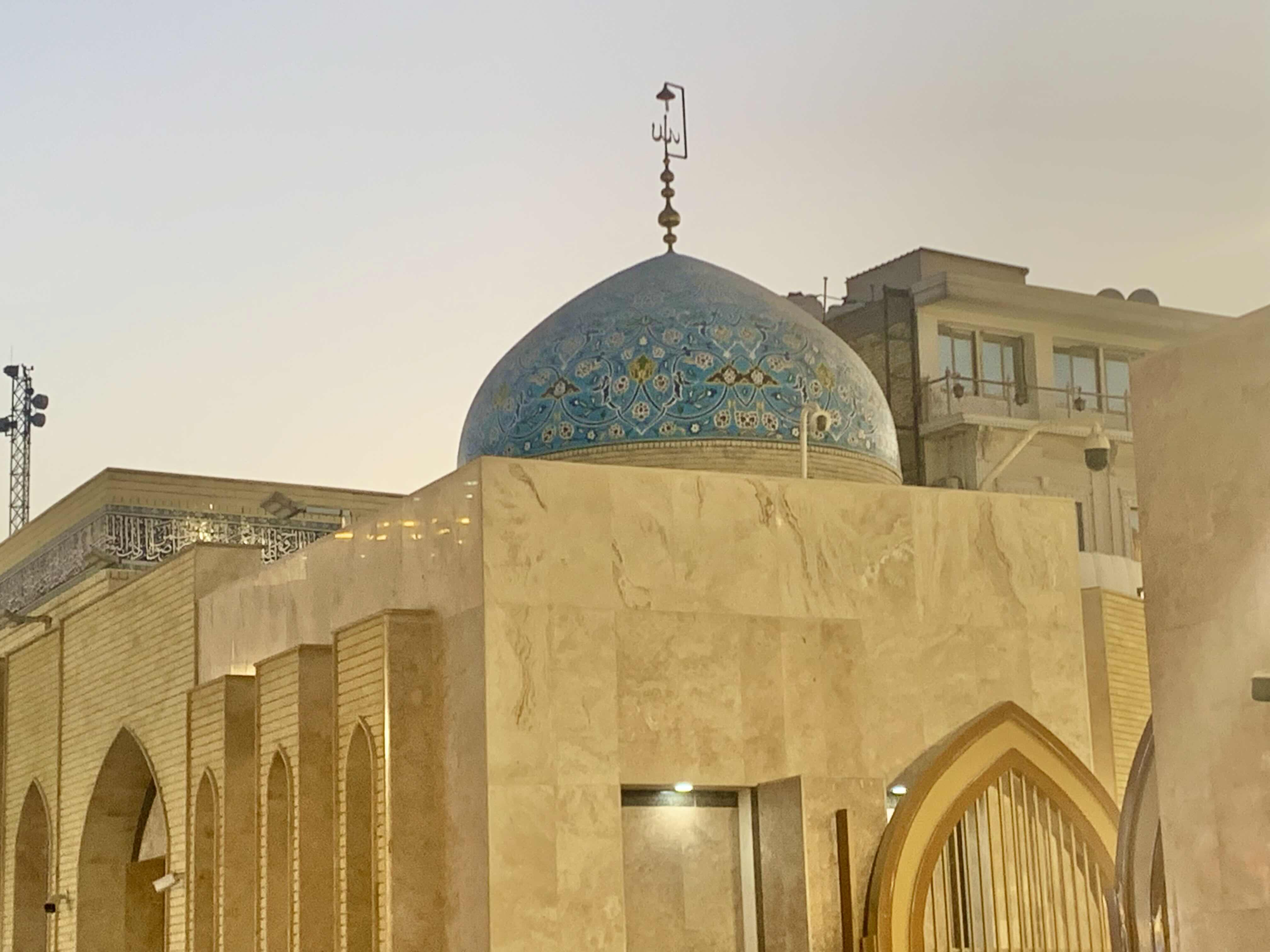
- The new structure of the shrine in 2025

Religion
- Affiliation: Islam
- Rite: Shi'a Islam
- Ecclesiastical or organizational status: Under reconstruction

Location
- Location: Kadhimiyya in Baghdad, Iraq

Architecture
- Established: After 1044; 982 years ago
- Demolished: February 2022

The Sharif al-Murtada Shrine (Arabic: مرقد الشريف المرتضى) is a Shi'i Islamic maqam located in the old area of al-Kadhimiyya in northern Baghdad, Iraq, next to the Kadhmiyya Mosque. The shrine houses the tomb of Sharif al-Murtaza, a Muslim scholar from the era of the Abbasid Caliphate, and the brother of Sharif al-Radi, whose shrine is also located next to his.

== Biography ==
=== Sharif al-Murtada ===
Sharif al-Murtada was a Muslim scholar based in Abbasid Baghdad that descended from the Islamic prophet Muhammad, the brother of Sharif al-Radi, and studied Islamic schools of thought. His father was a 5th descendant of Musa al-Kadhim, the seventh Twelver Imam. He was known for teaching many other Muslim students including Shaykh Tusi, who's believed to have founded the Hawza of Najaf later in his life. Al-Murtada was known for his philosophical work, and authoring around 66 books. Al-Murtada would pass away at the age of 81 on the 25th of Rabi al-Awwal in 436 AH, and was buried in Baghdad. His knowledge and work granted him the recognition as one of the greatest Islamic scholars of his time.

=== Description of the shrine ===
The shrine is located next to the main Kadhimiyya Mosque, and can be found from Bab al-Qibla's entrance of the main mosque's courtyard. The complex is topped by a loft dome decorated with Karbala'i tiles that used to also be decorated with verses from the Qu'ran. The shrine is considered a center for teaching Islamic sciences and is visited by thousands of people from all over Iraq.

=== The Present day ===
In 2022, the Shi'a Endowment Office ordered that the historic shrine be demolished due to claims that the shrine's old structure were dangerous for, under the pretext of rebuilding it. This move caused controversy in Iraq, especially among locals and heritage enthusiasts. Especially because Baghdad is notorious for neglecting its heritage like as other mosques, churches, and houses. At the time, it was also revealed that 3,600 heritage buildings had been demolished in Iraq, including this one. Many criticized the establishments overlooking the demolishment for their move, and hoped that the new building can reflect the old style and architecture of the previous shrine.
