= Al-Amali =

Al-Amali (Arabic: الامالی) means "the dictations", and is the title of more than thirty books by Shia Muslim scholars. The most prominent of these are:

- Al-Amali (Shaykh Mufid)
- Al-Amali (Ibn Babawayh)
