= Al-Amali (Shaykh Mufid) =

Book by Shaykh Mufid

Al-Amali or The Dictations is a theological, religious and historical book written by Shaykh Mufid. This book includes the ethical and theological beliefs among Shia.

== Concept ==
The tradition of writing Amali refers to a particular style in Islamic cultures such as disciplines like jurisprudence, tradition and literature. In other words, this concept designated on writing and arrangement of Hadith by hearers. This custom has three parts:one part is one who hear the hadith or traditions and dictate them as Mostamli. The second part is one who speaks and explains the tradition as Momli and third part is the action of dictation as Imla.

== Author ==
Shaykh Mufid was a prominent Twelver Shi'a theologian. He was son of Muallim, hence called Ibn Muallim.Taught by Al-Shaykh al-Saduq, Ibn Qulawayh, Abu Abdallah al-Basri and al-Rummani, Sharif al-Murtaza and al-Shaykh al-Tusi were among his students. Only 10 of his 200 works have survived which include Amali, Al-Irshad, Al-Muqni'ah, Tashih al-Itiqadat, etc.

== Content ==
Mufid mentioned different courses or Majlis in the book. Mufid's Amali counted as a theological book on Shia's creed. This book considered with kalam and religious subject rather than teaching the traditions. Imamiah and Zaydi Shia had deal with providing many collections of Amali book with theological subjects. The book of Amali considered to subjects like narrating some traditions of Ahle Bayt, some wars during Ali period like Jamal, characters of believers and so on. This book has 42 majlis or parts.
