= Arba'in pilgrimage =

Pilgrimage to Imam Hussein shrine

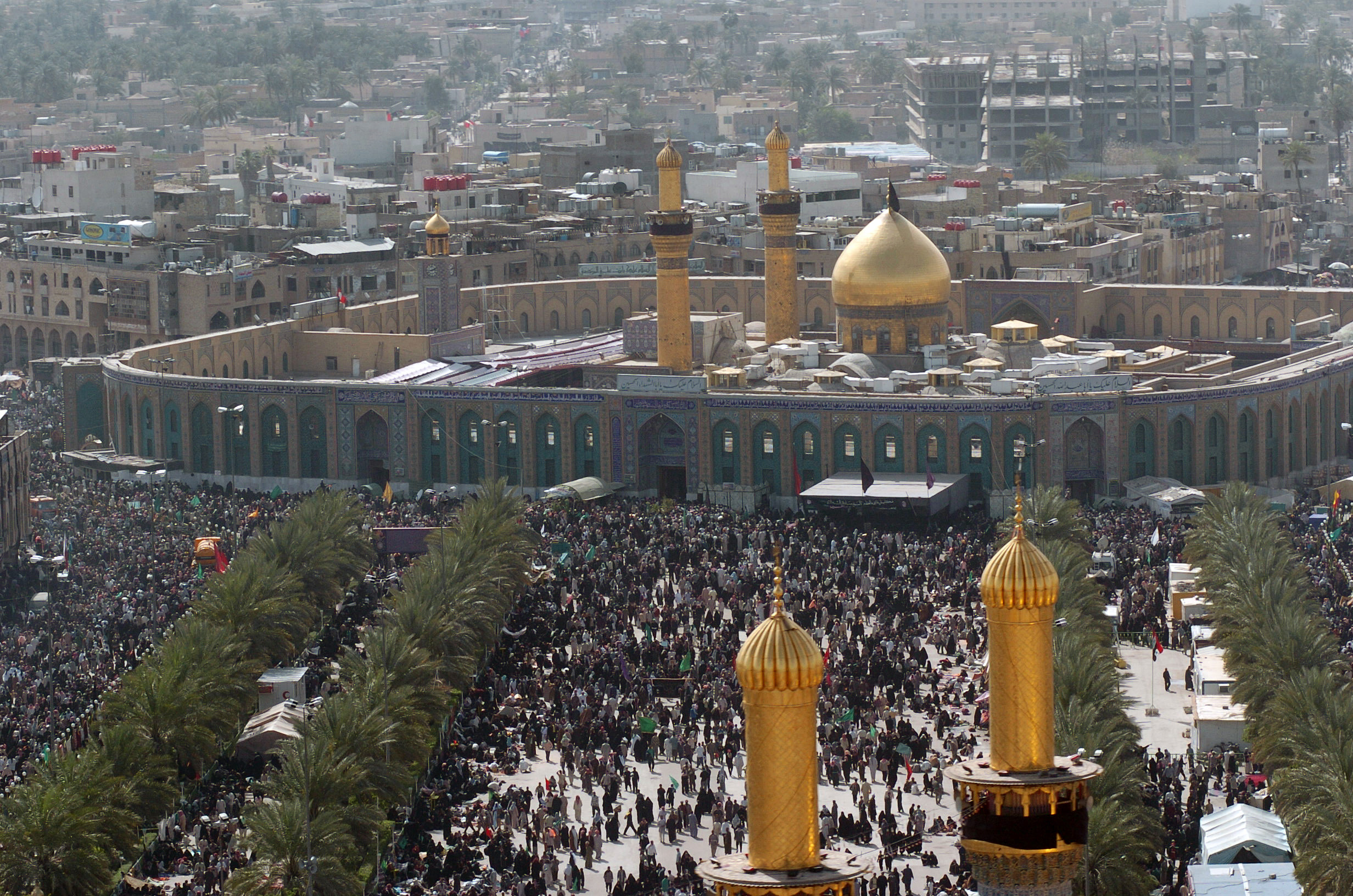
- Arba'in pilgrims near the shrine of Husayn ibn Ali, grandson of the Islamic prophet Muhammad and the third Shia imam
- Status: Active
- Genre: Religious gathering
- Date: Arba'in (twentieth of Safar)
- Frequency: Annually
- Locations: Karbala, Iraq
- Participants: Shia Muslims

The Arba'in pilgrimage is the world's largest annual public gathering. It is a pilgrimage to the shrine of Husayn ibn Ali, grandson of the Islamic prophet Muhammad and the third Shia imam. It is the world's second largest public gathering and occurs annually. Every year, on the twentieth of Safar, also known as Arba'in, millions of pilgrims flock to Karbala, Iraq, often arriving there on foot from the nearby city of Najaf. Arba'in marks forty days after the tenth of Muharram, known as Ashura. On this day in 61 AH (680 CE), Husayn was killed, alongside most of his relatives and his small retinue, in the Battle of Karbala against the army of the Umayyad caliph Yazid ibn Mu'awiya (r. 680–683). The battle followed Husayn's refusal to pledge his allegiance to Yazid, who is often portrayed by Muslim historians as impious and immoral. In Shia Islam, Karbala symbolizes the eternal struggle between good and evil, the pinnacle of self-sacrifice, and the ultimate sabotage of Muhammad's prophetic mission.

It is the second largest human gathering after the Hindu's Kumbh Mela of India. Pilgrims take the 80 kilometer route from Najaf to Karbala on foot over several days.

Forty is a sacred number in Islam, and the Arba'in pilgrimage is an early Shia tradition popularized by the Shia imams. In recent times, the Arba'in pilgrimage was banned by the Iraqi president Saddam Hussein, but rapidly grew after his deposal in 2003 from two million participants that year to around twenty million in 2014. Nevertheless, the voluntary Arba'in pilgrimage remains largely unknown in the West, even though it is far larger than Hajj, the obligatory Muslim pilgrimage. As with Ashura, Arba'in can be an occasion for violence against Shia Muslims. During the pilgrimage, free meals and accommodation are provided by volunteers.

== Significance of Arba'in in Shia Islam ==
In the Islamic calendar, twentieth of Safar is known as Arba'in, which marks forty days after Ashura, tenth of Muharram. In turn, Ashura is the death anniversary of Husayn ibn Ali, grandson of the Islamic prophet Muhammad and the third Shia imam. Husayn was killed on 10 Muharram 61 AH (10 October 680 CE), alongside most of his male relatives and his small retinue, in the Battle of Karbala against the army of the Umayyad caliph Yazid ibn Mu'awiya (r. 680–683), having been surrounded for some days and deprived of the drinking water of the nearby Euphrates river. After the battle, women and children in Husayn's camp were taken prisoner and marched to the Umayyad capital Damascus in Syria. The battle followed failed negotiations and Husayn's refusal to pledge his allegiance to Yazid, who is often portrayed by Muslim historians as impious and immoral. The fight took place in the desert land of Karbala, en route to the nearby Kufa, whose residents had earlier invited Husayn to lead them against Yazid.

In Shia Islam, Karbala symbolizes the eternal struggle between good and evil, the pinnacle of self-sacrifice, and the ultimate sabotage of Muhammad's prophetic mission. Historically, the event served to crystallize the Shia community into a distinct sect and remains an integral part of their religious identity to date. Ashura to Arba'in is thus a period of mourning for Shia Muslims, particularly the first ten days of Muharram and Arba'in. On the one hand, Shia mourners hope to share in the pain of Husayn to benefit from his intercession on the Day of Judgement. On the other, the Shia minority views mourning for Husayn as an act of protest against oppression, and as such a struggle for God (jihad).

== Origins ==
Forty is a sacred number in Islam, and commemorating the dead forty days after their death is a long-standing Islamic tradition, dating back to the early Islamic period. Shia tradition attaches a similar significance to Arba'in, the fortieth of Husayn. Probably by combining the accounts available to him, the Shia scholar Ibn Tawus (d. 1266) reports that Husayn's relatives returned via Karbala to their hometown of Medina when they were freed from captivity in Damascus. Upon arrival in Karbala on Arba'in, they met Jabir ibn Abd Allah (d. 697), a companion of Muhammad, who had learned about the death of Husayn through a divine sign. This origin story was repeated by many authors after Ibn Tawus, even though several scholars before Ibn Tawus report only the Arba'in pilgrimage of Jabir. The veracity of Ibn Tawus' account has therefore been questioned by some, including the Shia scholar Husain Noori Tabarsi (d. 1902) and the Islamicist Mahmoud M. Ayoub (d. 2021). Ayoub adds that Arba'in is not mentioned in Kamil al-ziyarat, an early and authoritative hadith collection by the Shia traditionist Ibn Qulawayh (d. c. 978). Whatever the case, such narratives may have helped establish Arba'in in Shia culture.

Risking the Umayyads' wrath, the commemoration of Karbala was initially small and private. In particular, pilgrimage to Karbala remained limited and precarious during the Umayyad period. Soon after the Umayyads fell, however, Shia imams worked to institutionalize the Ashura and Arba'in pilgrimages to the tomb of Husayn, as reflected in some of the traditions ascribed to the imams. For instance, the Shia imam Hasan al-Askari (d. c. 874) is reported to have listed the Arba'in pilgrimage among the five signs of a true believer.

== Among the largest annual gatherings ==
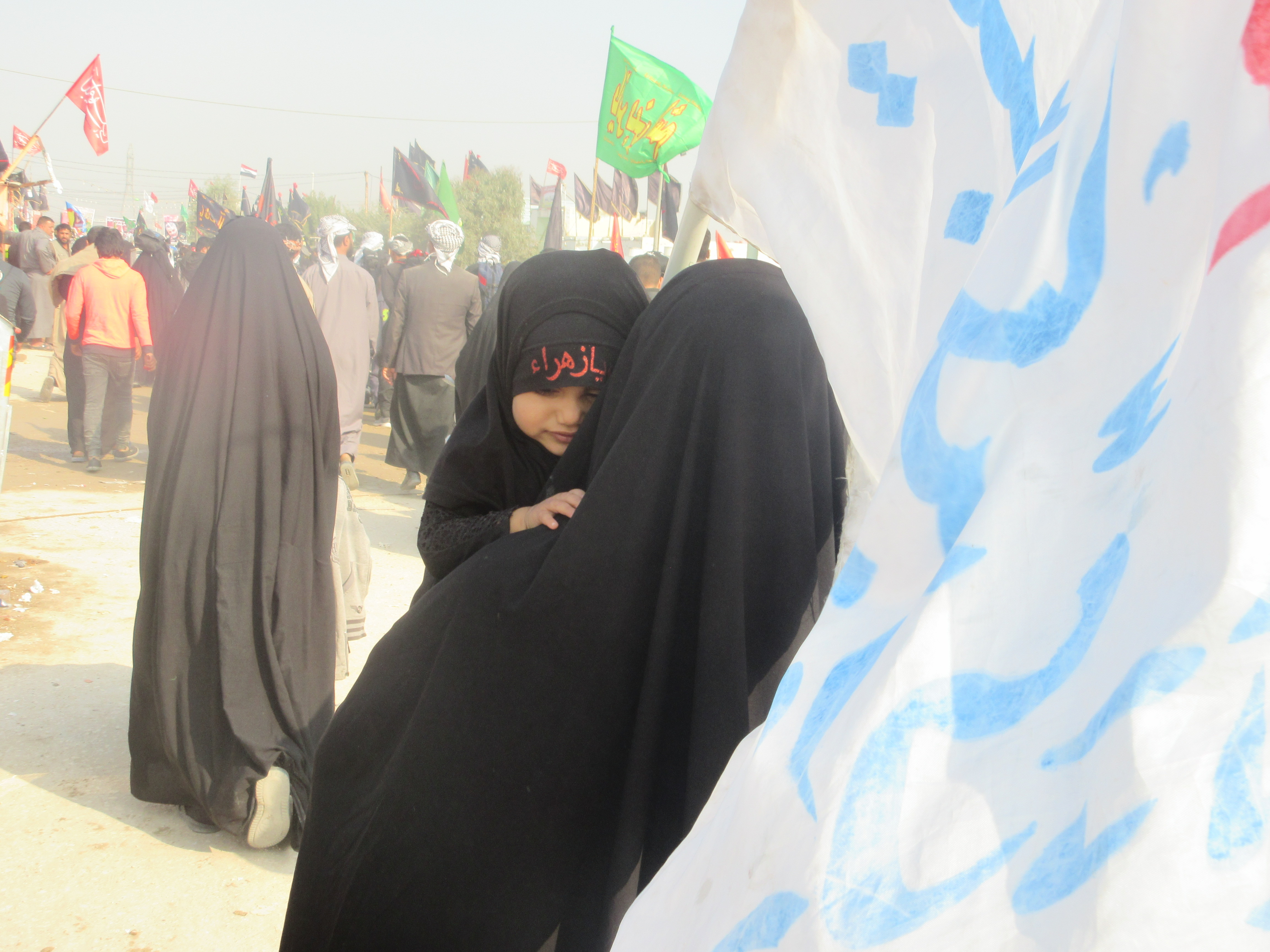
A mother and daughter participating in the 2015 Arba'in pilgrimage.

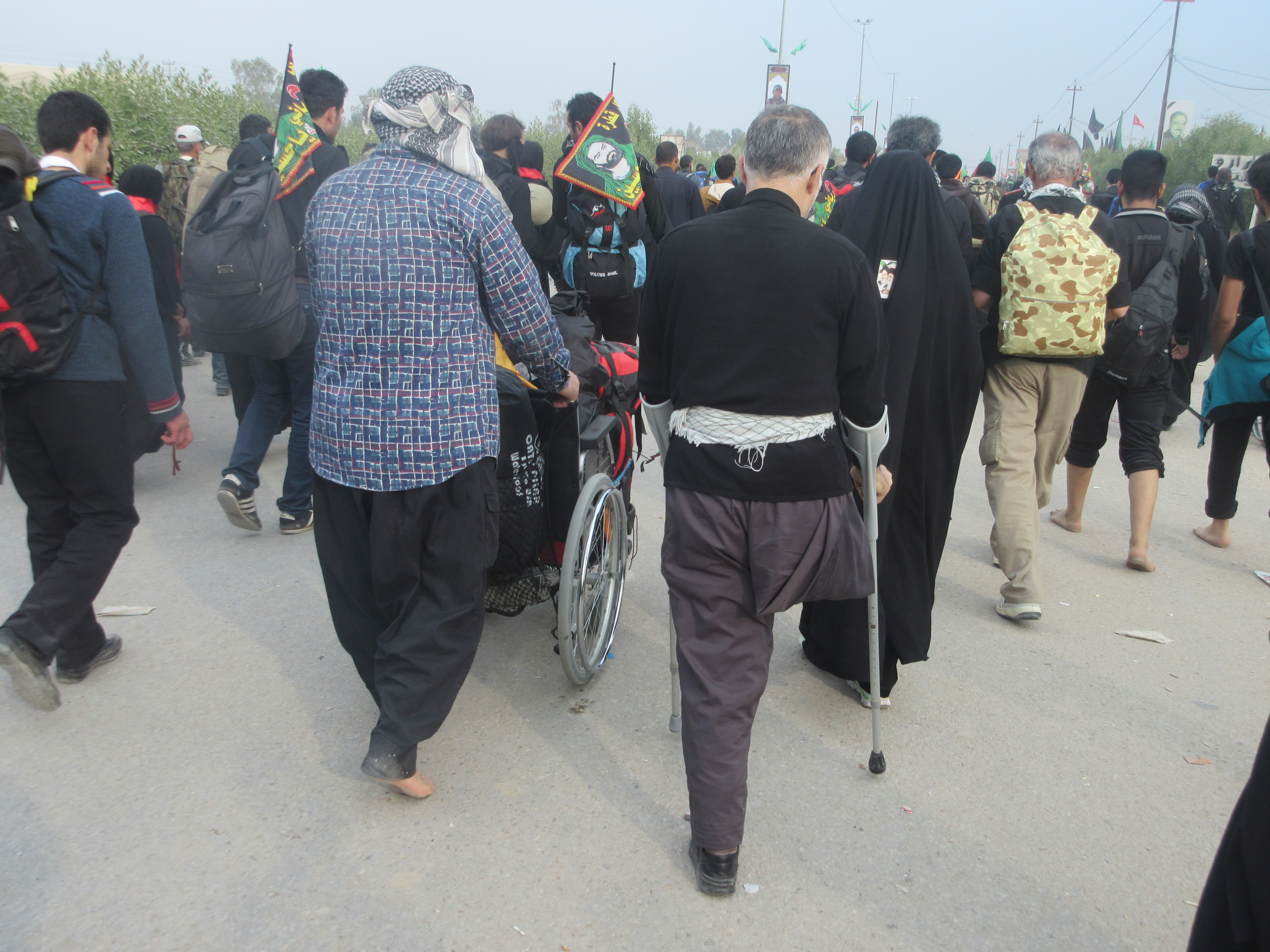
Handicapped men participating in the Arba'in pilgrimage between Najaf and Karbala on foot.

Arba'in is a day of pilgrimage to the shrine of Husayn in Karbala, Iraq. Pilgrims arrive there in large numbers, often on foot. The most popular route is Najaf to Karbala, as many pilgrims first travel to Najaf and then walk from there to Karbala, some eighty kilometers away, which takes about three days on foot. Along the way, volunteers provide the pilgrims with free meals and services. In Karbala alone, seven thousand of such hospitality units (mawakib, sing. mawkib) were set up in 2014. Indeed, this generosity and hospitality are said to characterize the Arba'in pilgrimage. When the pilgrims finally reach the shrine of Husayn in Karbala, they recite the ziyara of Arba'in, a supplication for this occasion.

As with other Shia rituals of Karbala, the Arba'in pilgrimage was banned by the Iraqi president Saddam Hussein (r. 1979–2003), who favored the Sunni community in Iraq, and viewed large Shia rituals as a political threat. The pilgrimage was revived immediately after the deposal of Saddam in 2003, with the total attendance numbers for this multi-day event growing from two million participants in that year to nine million in 2008, and around twenty million in 2014, making that year's pilgrimage the second largest gathering in history. The figure reached twenty-two million in 2015, according to Iraq's state-run media. In 2016, al-Khoei Foundation estimated around twenty-two million pilgrims. Even though the Hindu festival Kumbh Mela draws a larger crowd, it is held once every three years, which makes the Arba'in pilgrimage "the world's largest annual gathering in one place."

=== Comparison to Hajj ===
Unlike the voluntary Arba'in pilgrimage, performing Hajj once is obligatory for every Muslim who can afford it and is physically capable. Nevertheless, tight regulations on Hajj by Saudi authorities have driven up its costs, making pilgrimage to Shia shrines an affordable alternative for Shia Muslims. In recent years, Karbala has consistently received ten to twenty million pilgrims, compared to fewer than three million Hajj pilgrims in 2018.

=== Interfaith participation ===
As Hussein is regarded as a universal, borderless, and meta-religious symbol, the Arba'een pilgrimage, while rooted in Shia Islam, has emerged as a symbol of interfaith engagement. It increasingly attracts participants from various religious backgrounds, including Sunnis, Christians, Jews, and non-Abrahamic faiths such as Hindus, Yazidis, and Zoroastrians, who come to commemorate and mourn the death of Husayn. Each year, millions of participants, including Sunnis and people of other faiths, join the pilgrimage to Karbala, both to attend and to serve the devotees.

=== Free services ===
During the pilgrimage "copious supplies of food, small clinics and even dentists are available for pilgrims and they all work for free. The care of pilgrims is regarded as a religious duty." Along the roads to Karbala, mawakib provide "accommodation, food and beverage and medical services," and practically anything else the pilgrims need for free.

== Security aspects ==
As with Ashura, Arba'in can be an occasion for Sunni violence against Shia Muslims. For instance, a suicide bomber killed at least forty-four Arba'in pilgrims and wounded some seventy others in 2012 near Nasiriya, Iraq. In another attack in 2013, at least twenty pilgrims were killed and another fifty were wounded by a car bomb. The pilgrimage is therefore performed under tightened security, guarded by tens of thousands of Iraqi forces, and supported by Iranian advisers at least in 2015. In the same year, the Iraqi police seized eighteen booby-trapped dolls, stuffed with explosives, which were intended to be scattered on the roads leading to Karbala during the Arba'in pilgrimage.

== Political dimensions ==
As with other Shia rituals of Karbala, the Arba'in pilgrimage was banned by Saddam Hussein, who favored the Sunni minority in Iraq, and viewed Shia rituals as a political threat. The pilgrimage was revived immediately after his deposal in 2003 and that year's march to Karbala thus symbolized Shia defiance of Sunni regional powers. The 2003 pilgrimage also set off a regional wave of Sunni violence against the Shia minority as scores of Shia mourners were killed in multiple bombings in the following Ashura. Later on, as millions of Shias risked their lives by their participation, the Arba'in pilgrimage embodied their protests against the rise of ISIL, a Sunni extremist militant group with aspirations for a hardline Sunni caliphate and responsible for several Shia massacres. In recent years, the participation of non-Iraqi Shias in the Arba'in pilgrimage has fostered a sense of solidarity among Shias. In particular, the unprecedented Iranian attendance in recent pilgrimages could be an indication of Iran's victories against its Sunni regional rivals. Yet the Arba'in pilgrimage also exposes the rivalries between different political currents within the Shia community.

The contemporary scale and political significance of the Arba'in pilgrimage has also become a subject of critical academic inquiry. Iranian sociologist Hossein Solati, employing Foucauldian genealogical method, has analyzed the pilgrimage not as a continuous tradition but as a "constructed" and "re-articulated" cultural phenomenon. Solati argues that the Arba'in walk, as a "new manifestation" of cultural identity, represents a discursive break from earlier identity formations in Iran. His analysis focuses on the interplay of power, knowledge, and truth in shaping this ritual, suggesting that its current form is inseparable from the power relations and political imperatives of post-revolutionary Iran. This genealogical perspective, emphasizing "discontinuity" and the constructed nature of identity, offers a counterpoint to narratives that frame the pilgrimage solely as an expression of timeless faith or unified political will, instead revealing it as a site where contemporary Iranian identity is actively negotiated and produced.

== In the media ==
=== False reports ===
In 2016, Asharq al-Awsat, a Saudi-owned news site, reported from the World Health Organization (WHO) that "unplanned pregnancies and [...] disease" were seen "following the arrival of scores of unregulated Iranians to take part in the annual Shia pilgrimage to Karbala." The article added that 169 unmarried women were impregnated by Iranian pilgrims. These claims later proved to be fabricated. They were rejected by the WHO, which also condemned the use of its name for spreading false news. The Iraqi prime minister Haider al-Abadi and some other Shia leaders similarly condemned the report, which had further described the arrival of Iranian pilgrims as an "incursion against Iraqi sovereignty" and warned that they would spread diseases in Iraq.

== Gallery ==
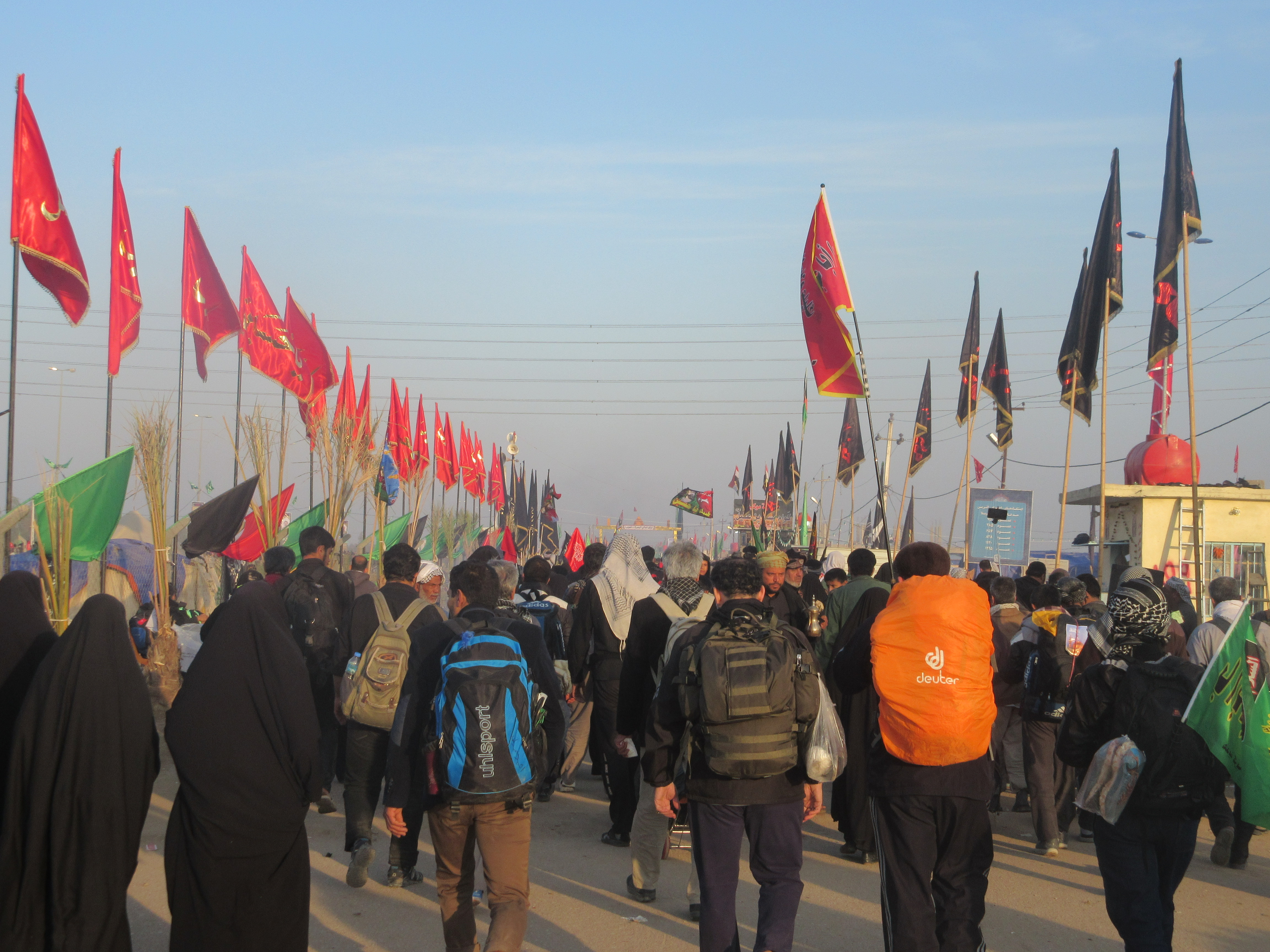
Arba'in pilgrims

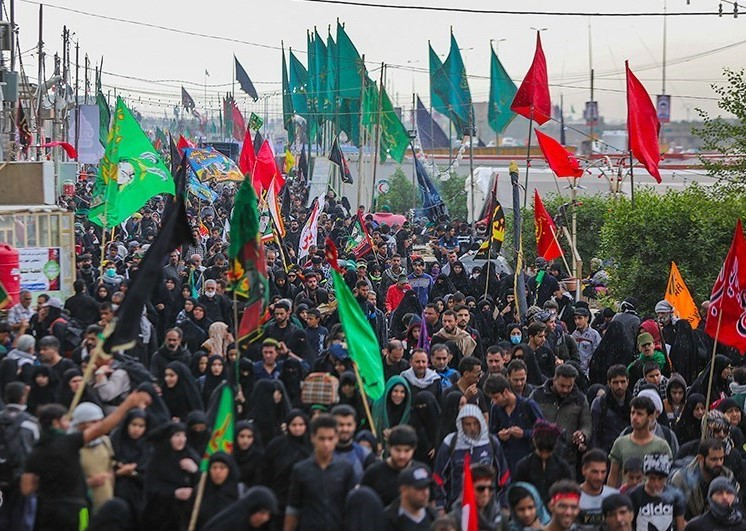

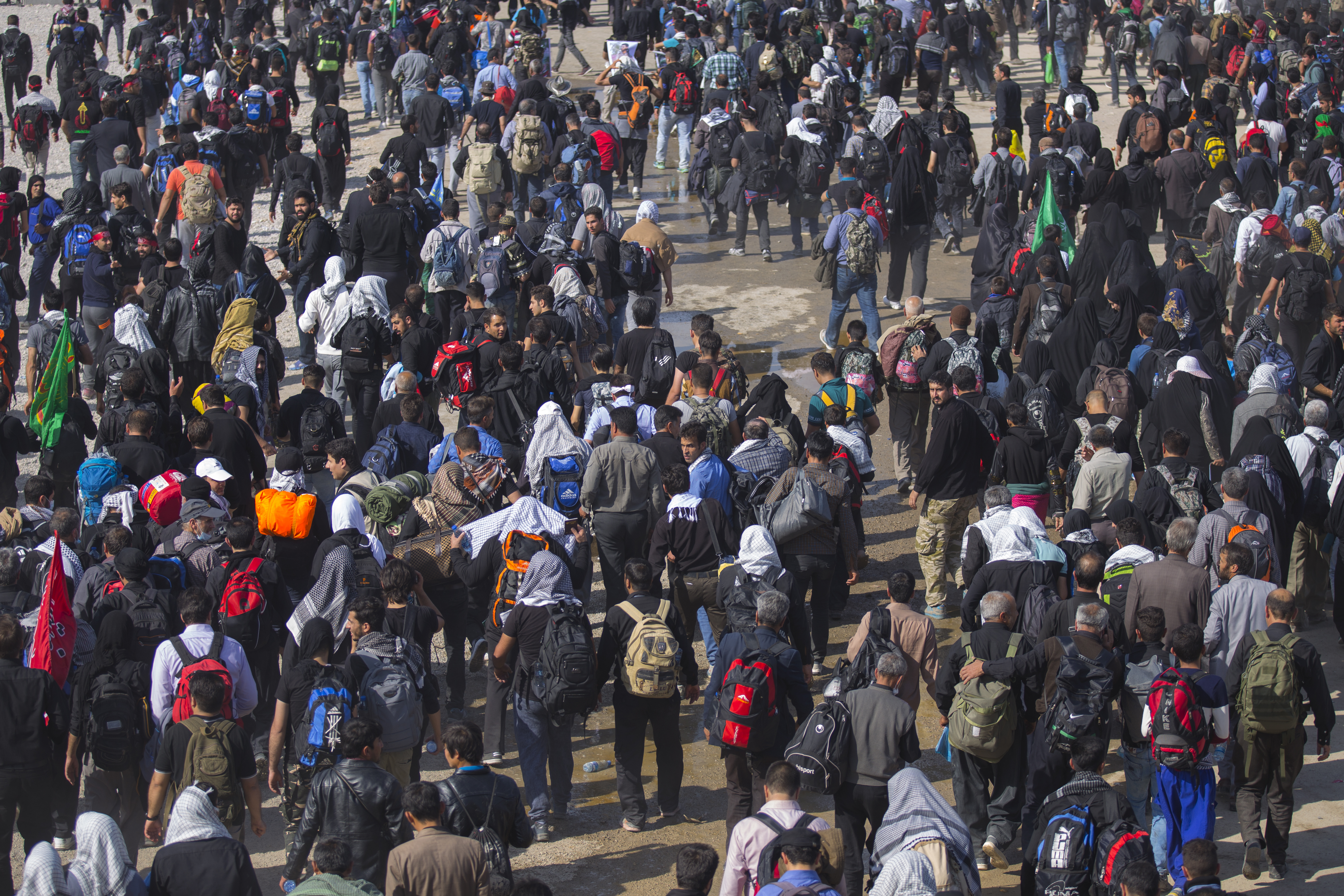

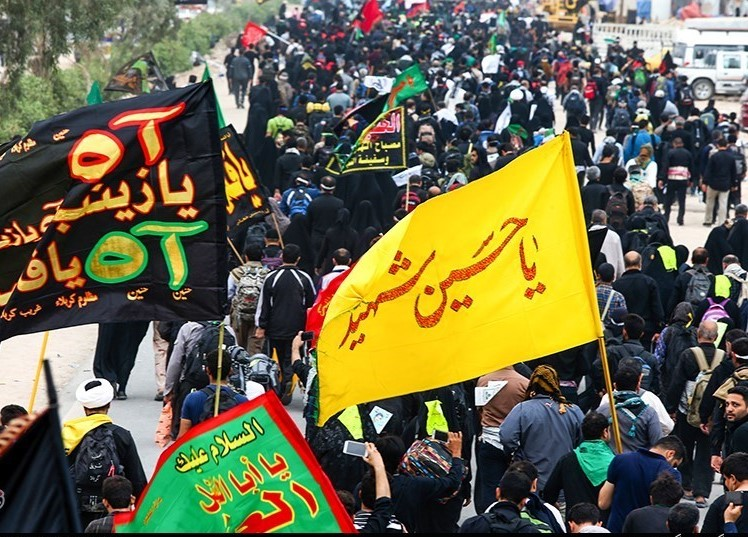

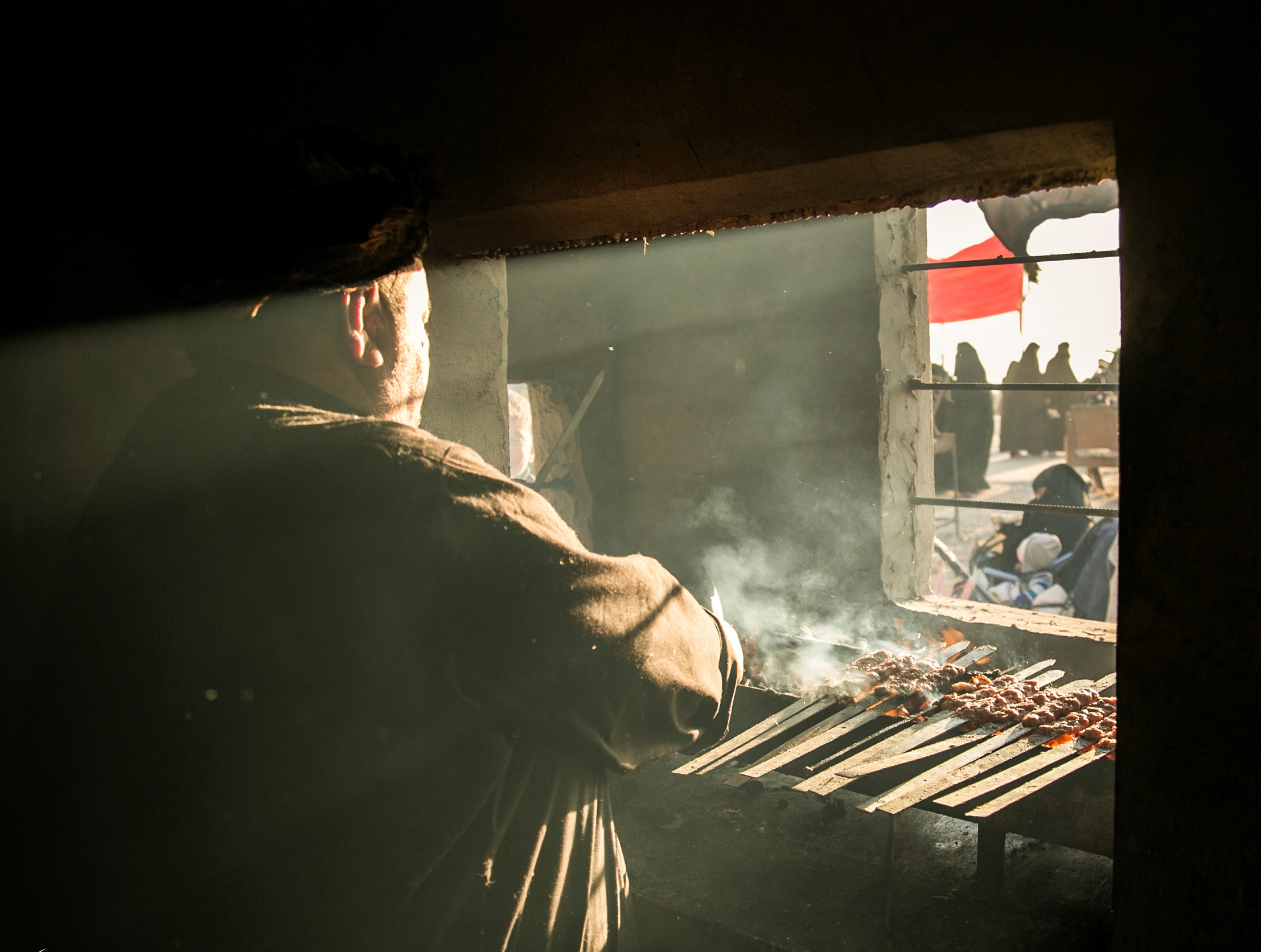
A man grilling meat to serve the Arba'in pilgrims

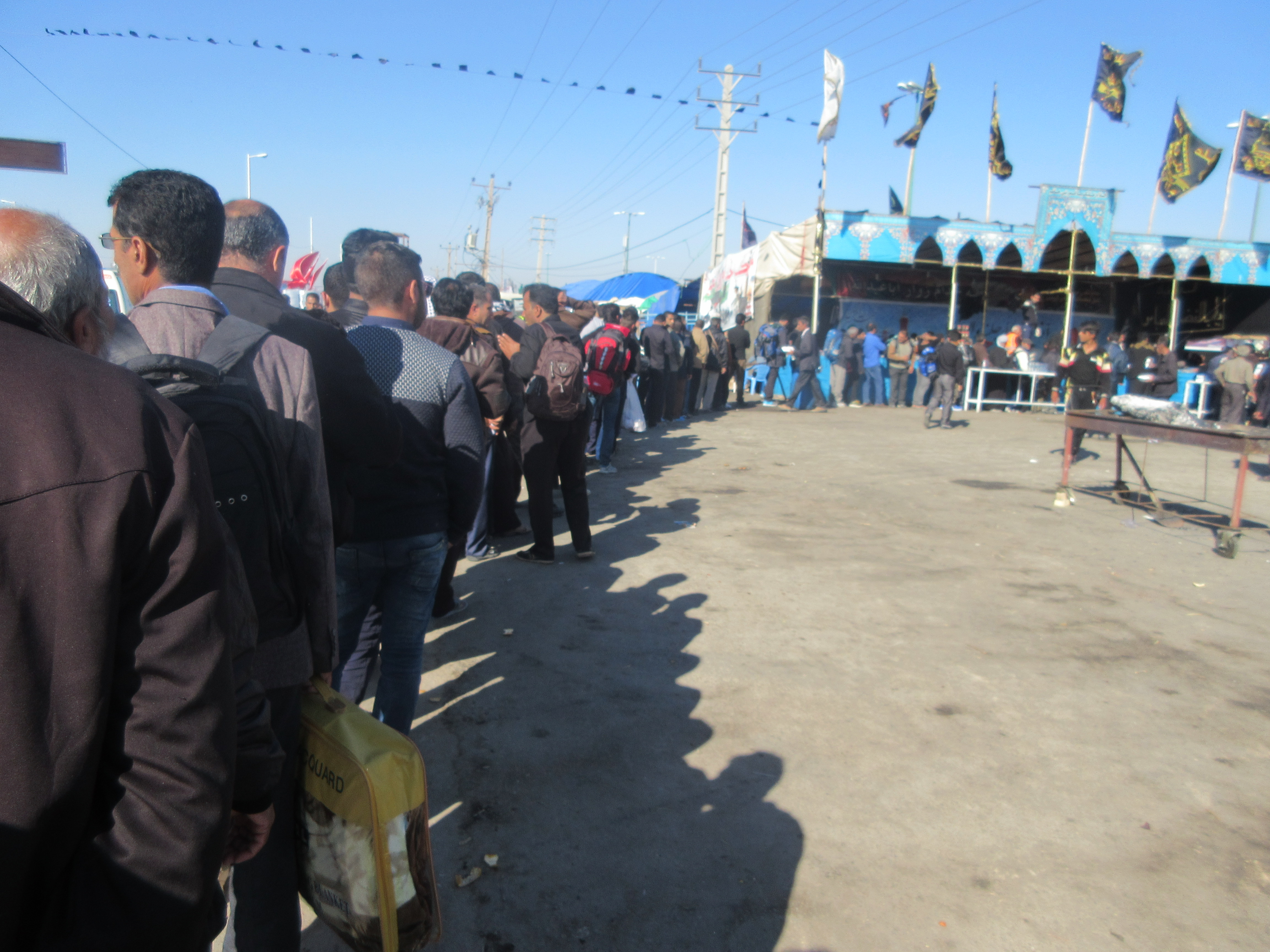
Free meals are distributed by volunteers

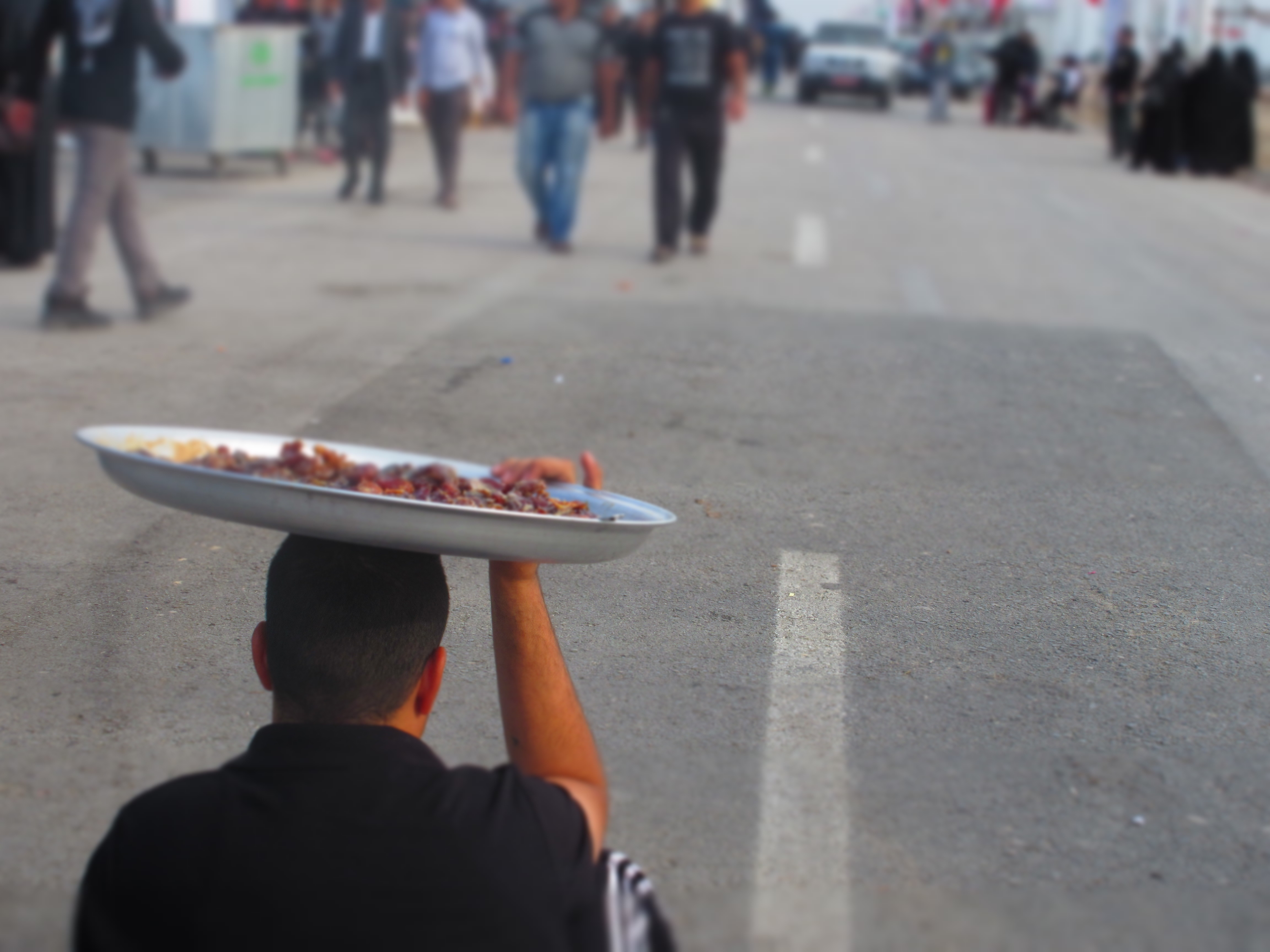
A man holding a tray full of dates for pilgrims

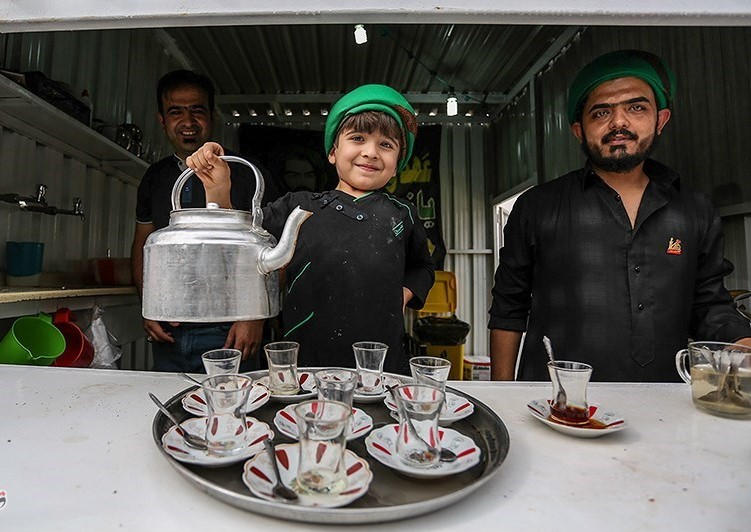
Volunteers that serve the Arba'in pilgrims

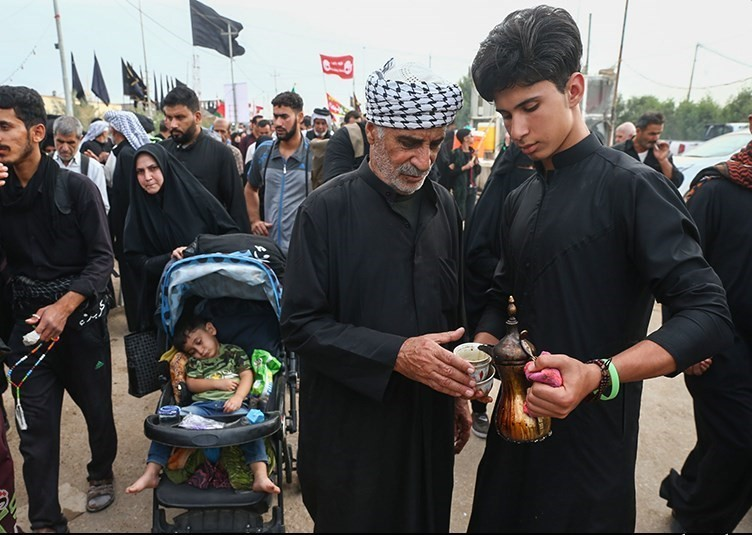

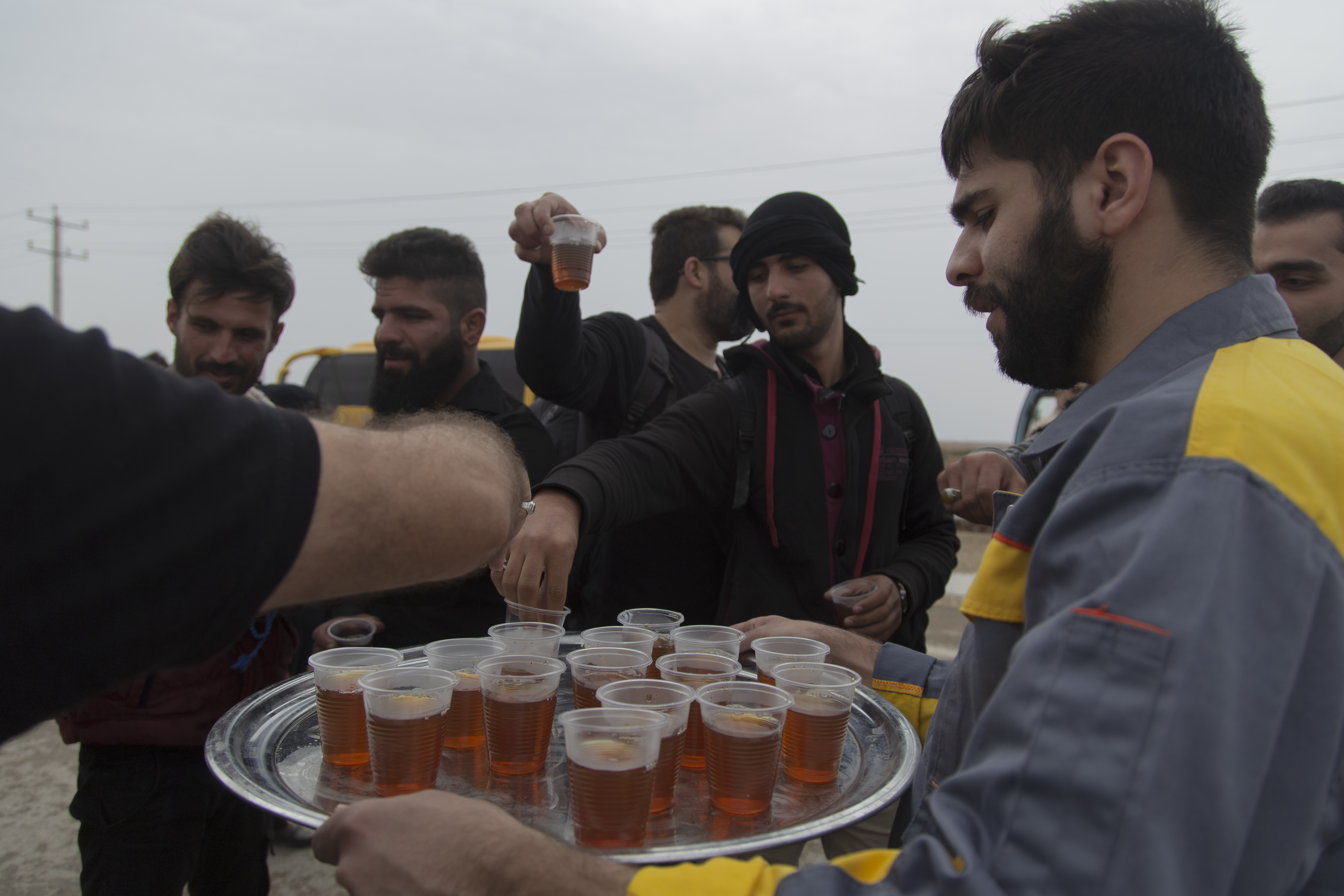
An Iranian volunteer distributing free drinks

== See also ==
- Mourning of Muharram
