= Al-Shaykh al-Mufid =

Iraqi Twelver Shia theologian (c. 948–1022)

Abu 'Abd Allah Muhammad ibn Muhammad ibn al-Nu'man أَبُو عَبْدِ ٱللّٰهِ مُحَمَّدُ بْنُ مُحَمَّدٍ بْنِ ٱلنُّعْمَانِ
- Title: al-Shaykh al-Mufid, Ibn al-Mu'allim

Personal life
- Born: 948 CE Ukbara, Iraq
- Died: 1022 (aged 73–74)
- Era: Islamic golden age
- Main interest(s): Kalam, Hadith, Ilm ar-Rijal, Usul and Fiqh
- Notable work(s): Al-Amali, Awail Al Maqalat and Kitab al-Irshad
- Occupation: Muslim scholar

Religious life
- Religion: Islam
- Denomination: Shia
- Sect: Twelver
- Jurisprudence: Ja'fari

Muslim leader
- Influenced by: Shaykh al-Saduq
- Influenced: Sharif Murtada, Sharif Razi and Shaykh Tusi

Abu 'Abd Allah Muhammad ibn Muhammad ibn al-Nu'man ibn 'Abd al-Salam al-'Ukbari al-Baghdadi (Arabic: أَبُو عَبْدِ ٱللّٰهِ مُحَمَّدُ بْنُ مُحَمَّدٍ بْنِ ٱلنُّعْمَانِ بْنِ عَبْدِ ٱلسَّلَامِ ٱلْحَارِثِيُّ ٱلْعُكْبَرِيُّ ٱلْبَغْدَادِيُّ), known as al-Shaykh al-Mufid (Arabic: الشیخ المفید) and Ibn al-Mu'allim (c. 948–1022 CE), was a prominent Twelver Shia Muslim scholar, jurist (faqīh) and theologian of Iraqi descent. His father was a teacher (mu'allim), hence his nickname Ibn al-Mu'allim ("son of the teacher"). The title "al-Mufid" ("the beneficient [one]") was given to him either by Muhammad al-Mahdi, the twelfth Shia Imam, or by al-Rummani, a Mu'tazilite scholar, after a discussion with him. The leader of the Shia community at his time, he was a staunch mutakallim, theologian, and jurist.

He studied and was taught by the prominent Shia scholars al-Shaykh al-Saduq and Ibn Qulawayh, as well as Mutazilite scholars Abu al-Husayn al-Basri and al-Rummani. His students included Sharif al-Murtaza and Shaykh Tusi, both of whom became important scholars in their own right. Only 10 of his 200 works have survived, among which are Amali, Al-Irshad, Al-Muqni'ah, and Tashih al-Itiqadat.

== Early life and education ==
Al-Mufid was born in 'Ukbara, a small town to the north of Baghdad, on 11th Dhul Qa'dah in 336 Hijra. According to Shaykh Tusi, however, he was born in 338 AH, and later migrated with his father to Baghdad, where the Shia Buwayhids were ruling. He studied with Ibn Babawayh. His family belonged to al-Ḥarithi clan from the tribe of Madhhaj.

Sharif al-Murtaza and Shaykh Tusi were among his students. His career coincided with that of the Mu'tazili theologian and leader of the Bahshamiyya school, 'Abd al-Jabbar. Al-Mufid was often attacked, and his library and school were destroyed.

He was also called Ibn Muallim, meaning "son of the teacher"; Muallim was his father. Among his teachers were the Shia theologian Abu Ali al-Iskafi, Abu Abdallah al-Marzubani, Abu Abdallah al-Basri, Abu al-Hassan, and Ali ibn Isa al-Rummani.

Commonly known as the leader of the Shia, Al-Mufid is regarded as the most famous scholar of the Buyid period and an eminent jurist, mainly due to his contributions in the field of kalam. According to Ibn al-Nadim, who knew al-Mufid personally, he was the head of the Shia Mutekallimun in the field of kalam, and al-Tawhidi, who was also personally familiar with al-Mufid, described him as "eloquent and skillful at dialectic (jadal)". His skill in polemical debate was such that he was said to be capable of convincing his opponents "that a wooden column was actually gold". He was taught the Islamic science of hadith by Al-Shaykh al-Saduq.

=== His nickname "al-Mufid" ===
It is said that al-Mufid earned his name "al-Mufid" as a result of a dispute about the relative merits of two events, the Ghadir Khumm and the Cave. Al-Mufid participated in a lecture given by Isa al-Rummani, where in a response to a question al-Rummani claimed that Ghadir Khum was based merely on riwayah (transmitted tradition), while the story of the Cave was based on diraya (knowledge). After the lecture, al-Mufid visited al-Rummani and asked him about Aisha, Talha, and Zubayr, who had rebelled against Ali, "a legitimate Imam". Al-Rummani responded that they had repented, and al-Mufid claimed that their repenting was merely based on riwaya, whereas the war was based in diraya. Al-Rummani then sent al-Mufid to al-Basri, with a note nicknaming the bearer "al-Mufid" ("the Instructor"). However, according to Ibn Shahr Ashub, in his Ma'alimul Ulamaa, the name was given to him by Muhammad al-Mahdi, the twelfth Shia Imam.

== As a theologian ==
Taught by Abdallah al-Basri, the Mutazili theologian and hanafi jurist, al-Mufid adopted many theological opinions. Macdermott believes that al-Mufid's theology is closer to the old Baghdad school of Mutazilism than to Abdul Jabbar's late Basran system. His methodology is closer to that of the Baghdad school, and he seems to have followed the Baghdad school and Mutazilism in his views concerning such questions as God's unity and justice. However, al-Mufid differs from Mutazilism on the problem of Imamate and the position of grave sin in this life. Al-Mufid tried to defend the role of reason – he described it as Al-Nazar – and also disputed for the truth and put away faults with the help of argument and proofs. Also, al-Mufid believed that the task of a theologian was according to reason and argument. His views were adopted by his pupils, 'Abd al-Jabbar and Sharif al-Murtaza.

=== God's attributes ===
Al-Mufid defined God's unity in this way:

I say that God is one in divinity and eternity. Nothing resembles Him, nor can anything be compared with Him. He alone deserves adoration. He has no second with Him in this, in any respect or connection.

According to al-Mufid, all believers in God's unity, save for "some eccentric anthropomorphists", agree with this. Like Mutazilis, al-Mufid rejected "the simple realism of the Ash'arite theory of attribution". However, al-Mufid and 'Abd al-Jabbar give different explanations of what an attribute is, and whether it is in an object or in the mind.

=== Prophecy ===
According to al-Mufid, there is an absolute necessity for prophets, since in order to know God and moral principles man needs revelation, and he noted that "every apostle (rasul) is a prophet but every prophet (nabi) is not an apostle". Although he took care to make a distinction between an apostle and a prophet as the Quran does, he did not believe that there was a difference in their functions, which enabled him to put the Imams on the level of the prophets and the apostles except in terms of their names.

=== Imamah ===
Al-Mufid defined the Imamiya as those who believe in the necessity of Imamah, Ismah and personal nass, i.e., personal designation. He tended to the belief that the Imams are superior to all the prophets and apostles, with the exception of Muhammad. According to al-Mufid, Imams can "take the place of the prophets in enforcing judgments, seeing to the execution of the legal penalties, safeguarding the Law, and educating mankind", a definition which makes an Imam not only "the head of the community in administrative, judicial, and military matters", but an "authoritative teacher of mankind". This attitude regarding Shia Imam is the basis of other teaching in Mufid theology such as Imam's immunity from sin and error, the necessity of having an imam in all the times and the way the Imam should be designated.

=== His criticisms of Al-Shaykh al-Saduq ===
On a number of occasions al-Mufid was critical of his teacher, Al-Shaykh al-Saduq, and his Tashih al-Itiqadat was a correction of al-Saduq's Risalat al-Itaqadat. Not limiting himself to theological matters, al-Mufid rejected al-Saduq's resort to akhbar al-ahad (single tradition), particularly when a legal statement is to be issued. However, he did not object to al-Saduq's views concerning the extent of the Quran; he only criticized his views on the nature of the Quran. Unlike al-Saduq, al-Mufid accepted "religious and speculative theology". While al-Saduq allowed controversy "only in the form of quoting and explaining the words of God, the Prophet, and the Imams", reporting a tradition from Ja'far al-Sadiq, the sixth Imam of Shia, al-Mufid believed that there were two kinds of disputation – namely, "true" and "vain".

== Works ==
Shaykh al-Mufid is said to have written 200 works, of which only a few more than ten have survived. Some of his works are as follows:

- Al-Amali (of Shaykh Mufid), also known as "Al-Majaalis", traditions recorded by al-Mufid's pupils during the sessions where al-Mufid gave the chain of narration ending up with himself
- Tashih al-Itiqadat, a correction of al-Saduq's Risalat al-Itiqadat
- َAwail Al Maqalat, an elaboration of al-Mufid's theology and "a practical catalogue of Imamite positions on disputed questions"
- Kitab al-Irshad or Al-Irshad fi ma'rifat hujaj Allah 'ala al-'ibad, on the lives of the Shia Imams
- Al-Fusul al-`Ashara fi al-Ghaybah
- Ahkam al-Nisa, on legal obligations regarding women
- Fifth Risalah on Ghaybah
- Al-Muqni'ah (The Legally Sufficient) The commentary on this book by Shaykh Tusi, Tadhhib al-Ahkam fi Sharh al-Muqni'ah, is among the Shia four books.

== Tawqīʿ ==
Al-Mufid received two Tawqīʿs by Muhammad al-Mahdi during major occultation.

== Death ==
Al-Mufid died on the third day of Ramadan in 413 AH. According to the Shia writer Shaykh Tusi, "The day of his death drew the largest crowd ever seen in any funeral, and both friends and foes wept uncontrollably". He remained buried in his own house for two years, after which his body was moved to Al Kadhimiya Mosque and buried next to his teacher, Ibn Qulawayh al-Qummi. His grave is near the feet of two of the Shia Imams, Musa al-Kadhim and his grandson Muhammad al-Jawad.

== In popular culture ==
The ninth day of Azar in Iran's official calendar is the commemoration day of Shaykh al-Mufid. An image of Mofid has been shown as imaginary in a paint.

== See also ==
- Muhammad al-Kulaynī
- Allāmah Majlisī
- Shaykh al-Hur al-Āmilī
- Ja'fari jurisprudence
- Holiest sites in Islam

== Secondary studies ==
- Paul Sander, Zwischen Charisma und Ratio, Berlin, 1994
- Tamima Bayhom-Daou, Shaykh Mufid, Makers of the Muslim World, Oxford, 2005
