= Kitab al-Irshad =

Book by Shaykh Mufid

Al-Irshad (Persian: ارشاد), also called the Book of Guidance into the Lives of the 12 Imams, is a biography of the lives of the 12 Shia Imams. It describes their historical circumstances, miracles and virtues. The book also includes evidence for Imamates among Shia.

== Author ==
Shaykh Mufid was a prominent Twelver Shi'a theologian. He was the son of Muallim, and was called Ibn Muallim. Mufid was taught by Al-Shaykh al-Saduq, Ibn Qulawayh, Abu Abdallah al-Basri and al-Rummani. He passed his teachings to his own students, including Sharif al-Murtaza and al-Shaykh al-Tusi. Only 10 of his 200 works have survived, including Amali, Al-Irshad, Al-Muqni'ah, and Tashih al-Itiqadat.

== Content ==
He described the situation and life of each Imam and the circumstances of each of their deaths. He mentioned the disappearance of the last Muhammad al-Mahdi. The work reflects Mufid's perspective on history and hadith rather than theology or philosophy.

This book begins by praising Allah, prophet Muhammad and Shia's twelve Imams. Nearly half of the book is dedicated to Imam Ali and his characteristics and virtues.

== Translation ==
This book was translated into English by I.K.A. Howard.

The book is available in many languages such as Arabic, Farsi, Urdu, Hindi, Azeri and German.

== See also ==
- Ja'fari jurisprudence
