= Abu Ahmad al-Husayn ibn Musa =

10th-century descendant of Ali

- Title: Naqib al-Ashraf

Personal life
- Born: Abu Ahmad al-Husayn ibn Musa al-Musawi
- Died: 1009/10 CE
- Era: Islamic Golden Age
- Known for: Acting Abbasid Chief Judge from 1003/004 to 1004.
- Occupation: Official for the Buyid Amir al-umara of Baghdad.
- Relatives: Al-Sharif al-Murtaza (son), Al-Sharif al-Radi (son)

Religious life
- Religion: Islam
- Denomination: Shi'ism
- Creed: Twelver (probably)

Abu Ahmad al-Husayn ibn Musa al-Musawi was an Alid who held senior offices for the Buyid Amir al-umara in Baghdad in the late 10th/early 11th century, He also held the office of an acting chief judge for the Abbasid caliph during a short period in 1004 CE. He was notably the father of the Twelver Shi'a scholars al-Sharif al-Murtada and al-Sharif al-Radi.

== Life ==
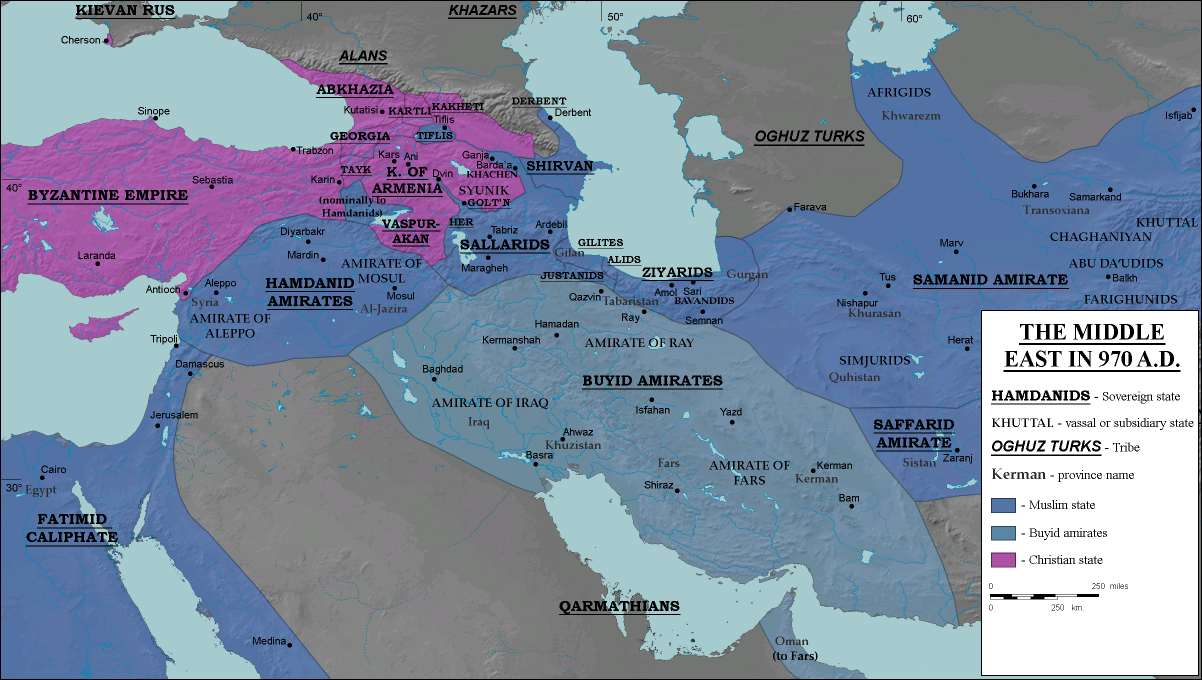
Map of the Middle East c. 970, at the beginning of al-Husayn's career

Al-Husayn was a Musawid, a descendant of the Shi'a imam, Musa al-Kazim (d. 799). He had three sons: Abu Muhammad al-Qasim, Abu'l-Qasim Ali, known as al-Sharif al-Murtada, and Abu'l-Hasan Muhammad, better known as al-Sharif al-Radi.

Al-Husayn was the first member of his family to be appointed as dean of the Alids (naqib al-ashraf) by the Buyid emir of Iraq, Mu'izz al-Dawla (r. 945–967), on 7 June 965. The post also entailed the supervision of the Hajj pilgrim caravans, until 970, when it returned to the responsibility of the Banu Yahya family of Kufa.

As descendants of Musa, al-Husayn and his family were Twelver Shi'a, which caused reactions among some of the Alids, accustomed to be led by a member of the Hasanid line; as a result, some Alids refused to recognize his authority and asked to be exempted from it. Al-Husayn established a good and close relationship with the new emir, Izz al-Dawla (r. 967–978), who kept him in office and assigned him in 968/9 to mediate between the Hamdanid emir of Mosul, Abu Taghlib, and his younger half-brother Abu'l-Muzzafar Hamdan. After riots erupted in Baghdad in 971, al-Husayn was dismissed, but still retained the favour of Izz al-Dawla, who entrusted him with the peace negotiations with the Hamdanids in 972/3.

When Adud al-Dawla (r. 943–983) first seized Baghdad in 975, al-Husayn was restored as naqib al-ashraf in August/September, and retained by Izz al-Dawla after his return to the city, and again by Adud al-Dawla when he finally took control of Iraq in 978. More than that, al-Husayn was appointed to lead the conquest and pacification of formerly Hamdanid Upper Mesopotamia, which he successfully carried out in 978–979. Once Adud al-Dawla's position was secure, however, he did not hesitate to strike against the incumbent elites of Iraq: in August /September 979, al-Husayn was accused of embezzlement and deposed, and exiled along with his brother, Ahmad, to Fars. The Zaydi-leaning Alid Muhammad ibn Umar, and the chief qadi and friend of al-Husayn, Ibn Ma'ruf, also fell victim to this purge, and were banished to Fars. The exiles were released from confinement after the death of Adud al-Dawla in 983, but remained in exile in Fars until 987, when the Buyid emir of Fars, Sharaf al-Dawla (r. 983–988/9), also seized control of Iraq. The 12th-century historian Ibn al-Jawzi claims that al-Husayn was reappointed as naqib al-ashraf, until he resigned in September 989 due to illness, but this is not corroborated in other sources.

Al-Husayn was reappointed as naqib al-ashraf by Baha al-Dawla (r. 988–1012) in May/June 990. In addition he received responsibility for civil courts (mazalim). His two sons, al-Radi and al-Murtada, were appointed as his deputies. At about the same time, a fierce rivalry developed between al-Husayn and his family and the pro-Zaydi Muhammad ibn Umar, who was imprisoned in the ensuing purge. Al-Husayn was high in favour with Baha al-Dawla, who entrusted him with an embassy to the Uqaylids in 992/3, during which he was imprisoned by the Uqaylid emir Muhammad ibn al-Musayyab. In January 994 al-Husayn was the legal guardian (wali) for Baha al-Dawla's daughter during her wedding with Caliph al-Qadir. A change in government however brought another dismissal, as the new Buyid vizier, Shapur, was a partisan of Muhammad ibn Umar, whom he released from imprisonment. In December 994, al-Husayn was replaced in his offices by a Zaydi candidate.

Al-Husayn nevertheless managed to restore his standing, for by 999 he was sent by Baha al-Dawla to accompany his troops during the capture of Shiraz. In 1003/4, after the death of Muhammad ibn Umar, al-Husayn was re-appointed to his previous position. To this was now added the post of chief religious judge (qadi), but his well-known Shi'a leanings and lack of previous service as a qadi in Baghdad aroused the opposition of the Sunni populace and Caliph al-Qadir; the appointment was consequently of short duration.

Al-Husayn died in 1009/10. He was succeeded by his son al-Radi, and after the latter's death in June 1015 by another son, al-Murtada.

== Sources ==
- Busse, Heribert (2004) [1969]. Chalif und Grosskönig – Die Buyiden im Irak (945-1055) [Caliph and Great King – The Buyids in Iraq (945-1055)] (in German). Würzburg: Ergon Verlag. ISBN 3-89913-005-7.
