= Ziyarat of Arba'in =

The ziyarat of Arba'in (Arabic: زیارة الأربعین) is an annual pilgrimage that takes place in the holy city of Karbala in Iraq. It is the world's largest pilgrimage, reaching an estimated number of over 22 million pilgrims in 2023. The pilgrimage seeks to honour the death of the third Shi'ite Imam, Husayn ibn Ali, who was a grandson of Muhammad. Husayn was killed during the Battle of Karbala in 680 AD. In Arabic, "arba'in" means "forty", reverting to the 40th day after Husayn's death, and "ziyarat" means "visit". While the visitation of Husayn is not considered an Islamic obligation, like the Hajj (pilgrimage to Mecca), it plays an integral role in the religious life of Shia Islam.

The culture as stated by a researcher provides ways to express social emotion and from sociological perspective, feelings rules are ″appropriate ways to express internal sensation". The ziyarat is directly or indirectly used to express the mourning of imams.

== Importance of the ziyarat of Arba'in ==
The number 40 holds an important status in the light of Islam. The Quran emphasized the importance of the number 40: "And We made an appointment with Moses for thirty nights and perfected them by [the addition of] ten; so the term of his Lord was completed as forty nights. And Moses said to his brother Aaron, "Take my place among my people, do right [by them], and do not follow the way of the corrupters".

The Hadith had also stated that the earth mourns the death of a believer for forty mornings. According to the teachings of Ahlul Bayt, the ziyarat of Arba'in holds a special spiritual significance. With respect to Imam Hussein, Imam Baqir reported that the heavens wept over Imam Hussein for forty mornings, with the sun rising and setting red.

== Duties of the mourners ==
According to Imam Hasan al-Askari, the signs of a believers are five:

- Performing fifty-one rakats of salaat (prayer) daily,
- Reciting Ziyarah of Arba'in,
- Wearing a ring in the right hand,
- Placing the forehead on dust [during sajda],
- Saying "Bismillah al-rahman al-rahim" aloud in salaat.

There are some duties that mourners have to observe during forty day of Imam Hussein. They are as follow:

- Ziyarat al-Arba'in
- Use the ziyarat to link-up with the Imam and take him as a role model in everything.
- Living in peace with others that are lovers of Imam Hussein
- Rise against the oppression and come to the aid of oppressed.
- Renew our pledge, love and bond with the Ahlul-Bayt.

== See also ==
- Arba'in pilgrimage
- Ziyarat Ashura
- Battle of Karbala
- Rowzeh-khani
- Ashura
- Tasu'a
