= Al-Sharif al-Radi =

Iraqi poet and Shia Muslim scholar (970 – 1015)

Sayyid Muhammad bin al-Husayn bin Musa مُحَمَّدٌ بنُ الحُسَيْنِ بنِ مُوْسَى
- الشَّرِيْفِ الرَّضِيِّ مُحَمَّدٌ بنُ الحُسَيْنِ بنِ مُوْسَى
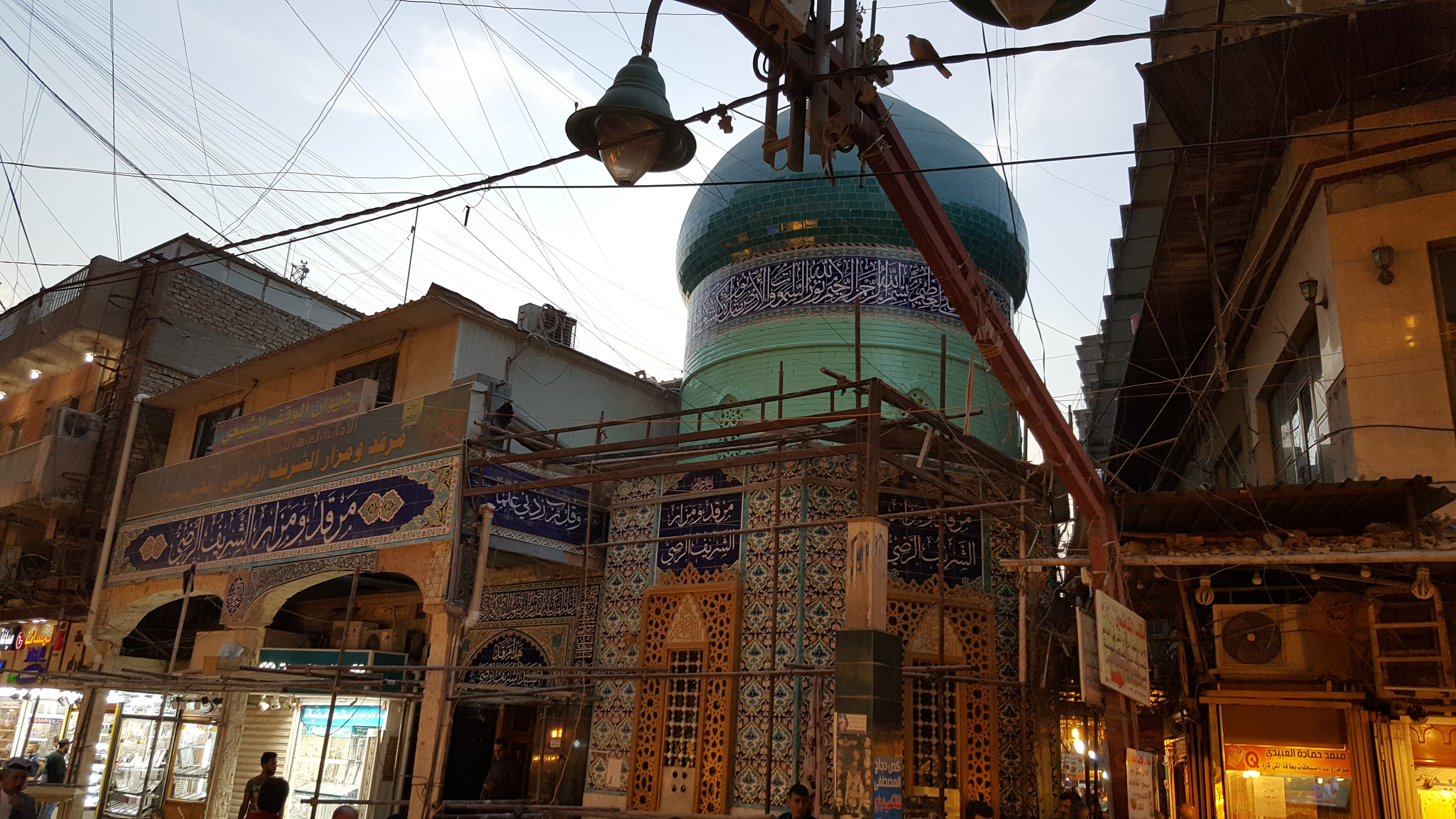
- Tomb of Sayyid al-Radi in Baghdad
- Title: al-Sharif al-Radi الشَّرِيْفِ الرَّضِيِّ

Personal life
- Born: 970 Baghdad, Iraq
- Died: 1015 (aged 44–45) Kadhimiya, Baghdad
- Era: Islamic golden age
- Main interest(s): Tafsir, Arabic literature
- Notable work: Peak of Eloquence (collection of Imam Ali quotations)

Religious life
- Religion: Islam
- Denomination: Shia
- Sect: Twelver
- Jurisprudence: Ja'fari

Muslim leader
- Influenced by: Al-Shaykh Al-Mufid

Abū al-Ḥasan Muḥammad bin al-Ḥusayn bin Mūsā al-Abrash al-Mūsawī al-Qurashi (Arabic: أبُو الحَسَنِ السَّيِّدُ مُحَمَّدٌ بنُ الحُسَيْنِ بنِ مُوْسَى الأبرش المُوسَوِيُّ الهَاشِمِيُّ القُرَشِيُّ; 970 – 1015), also known as al-Sharīf al-Raḍī (Arabic: الشَّرِيْفِ الرَّضِيِّ) was a Shia scholar and poet of Iraqi descent. Al-Radi wrote several books on Islamic issues and interpretation of the Quran. His most well-known book is Nahj al-Balagha.

His elder brother al-Sharif al-Murtada was also a theologian and poet. His work is still published in the universities of Cairo and Beirut, and is part of the course of Arabic literature.

== Pedigree ==
Al-Radi's father, Abu Ahmad al-Husayn ibn Musa, was a descendant of Ibrahim al-Asghar, the son of the seventh Shia imam, Musa al-Kazim. In 965, the Buyid ruler Mu'izz al-Dawla appointed his father naqib al-ashraf, the dean of the Alids in Iraq. There are also claims that he is the descendant of Ibrahim al-Mujab, the grandson of al-Kazim. His mother was the granddaughter of Hasan al-Utrush, a descendant of the fourth Shia imam, Ali Zayn al-Abidin. For this reason, he was also known as thil hasabayn (the possessor of two lineages), since he relates back to the Ahl al-Bayt paternally and maternally.

== Biography ==
Al-Radi was born in 970 in the Abbasid capital, Baghdad, and died in 1015 in his hometown. His grave is located in Kadhimiya, Baghdad. Al-Radi was the third of four children, having two sisters and a brother. After his father's death, he took the post.

Al-Radi's family was affluent, as his mother Fatima inherited a good fortune from her father. She sponsored the family when the property of her husband was confiscated by the Buyid prince 'Adud al-Dawla.

Scholar Abu Ahmad Adnan was his son. There were no grandchildren.

=== Education and teaching ===
Abu Ali al-Farisi taught Al-Redi.

He also founded a school named Dar ul'Ilm (Arabic: دار العلم, literally House of knowledge) in which he trained many students.

=== Works ===
The book is a collection of sermons, precepts, prayers, epistles, and aphorisms of Ali and compiled by al-Radi in the tenth century. A number of his contemporaries wrote commentaries on al-Radi's compilation.

==== Extent and scope of compilation ====
Ali's sermons were compiled, read, and taught before al-Radi was born. The services of al-Radi are now regarded as significant in the philosophy of monotheism.

Collected sermons in the Nahj al-Balagha cover Islam, theology and metaphysics; worship, wisdom, philosophy; piety and the afterlife.

However, critics of the Nahj al-Balagha generally raise two objections: they claim that al-Murtada is one of the authors, and most of the contents are not by Ali.

== See also ==
- Islamic scholars
- List of deceased maraji
