= Sharif al-Murtaza =

Islamic Shiite scholar

Sharif al-Murtaza الشريف المرتضى
- Title: ʿAlam al-Hudā

Personal life
- Born: Abū al-Qāsim ʿAlī ibn al-Ḥusayn al-Sharīf al-Murtaḍā; 355 AH/965 CE Baghdad, Iraq
- Died: 436 AH/1044 CE
- Resting place: Sharif al-Murtada Shrine in Baghdad, Iraq
- Parent(s): Abu Ahmad al-Husayn ibn Musa (father), Fatima (mother)
- Era: Islamic Golden Age
- Main interest(s): Theology, Jurisprudence, Hadith
- Known for: Prominent Shia scholar, theologian, and jurist
- Occupation: Scholar, Theologian, Jurist
- Relatives: Al-Sharif al-Radi (brother)

Religious life
- Religion: Islam
- Denomination: Shia
- Sect: Twelver
- Jurisprudence: Ja'fari

Muslim leader
- Influenced by: Shaykh al-Mufid, Qadi Abd al-Jabbar, Al-Marzubani
- Influenced: Shaykh Tusi

Abū al-Qāsim ʿAlī ibn al-Ḥusayn al-Sharīf al-Murtaḍā (Arabic: أبو القاسم علي بن الحسين الشريف المرتضى; 965–1044 CE) commonly known as Sharīf Murtaḍā or Sayyid Murtaḍā (Murtazā instead of Murtaḍā in non-Arabic languages) and also popular as ʿAlam al-Hudā (Arabic: علم الهدى), was a Shia Muslim scholar, jurist and theologian from Iraq, who was widely considered one of the foremost Shia scholars of his time. He was one of the students of Shaykh al-Mufīd, who taught in Baghdad and later in Najaf. His younger brother is al-Sharif al-Radi, the compiler of Nahj al-Balagha.

Al-Sharif al-Murtada lived during the era of the Shia Buyid dynasty of Daylamite origin, which came to rule over Iraq and parts of Iran in 934–1062, which also coincided with the golden age of Arabic literature, and great poets al-Ma'arri were among his contemporaries. His prominence as a Shiite authority is also evident in the outreach of his letters, which addressed inquiries of Shiite communities (masā'il) in Tiberias, Tripoli, Sidon, Mosul and Aleppo.

== Full name ==
His full name was "Ali ibn al-Husayn ibn Musa ibn Muhammad ibn Musa ibn Ibrahim ibn Musa al-Kazim" (Arabic: علي بن الحسين بن موسی بن محمد بن موسی بن ابراهيم بن موسى الكاظم).

== Lineage ==
Ali ibn al-Husayn was born in Baghdad in Rajab 355 AH (June/July 966 CE) to Abu Ahmad al-Husayn ibn Musa, a fifth generation descendant of seventh Twelver Shia Imam, Musa al-Kazim (745–799). He was the naqib al-ashraf at his time. His mother was Fatima, the great-granddaughter of Zaydi Imam, Hasan al-Utrush, the ruler of Alavid Tabaristan (864–928). She was a pious and noble lady, who was held in high esteem by scholars and other notables. At her request, the great scholar Shaykh al-Mufīd compiled the book "Ahkām al-Nisā'", which contains the fiqhi rules for women.

His father called him Ali, and his nickname was Murtada. His honorific title was 'Alam al-Huda (Arabic: علم الهدى). He was reportedly called as such according to a popular narration by Muhammad ibn Makki, when an Abbasid vizier called Muhammad ibn al-Husayn was told in a dream by Imam Ali to seek 'Alam al-Huda, and when asked on his identity, informed him it's Sharif Murtada.

=== Family tree ===
==== From father's side ====
He is Sayyid Ali al-Sharif al-Murtada, son of:

1. Sayyid Husayn ibn Musa
2. Sayyid Musa ibn Muhammad "al-Abrash"
3. Sayyid Muhammad ibn Musa "al-A'raj"
4. Sayyid Musa ibn Ibrahim "Abu Subha"
5. Sayyid Ibrahim ibn Musa al-Murtada
6. Imam Musa al-Kazim
7. Imam Ja'far al-Sadiq
8. Imam Muhammad al-Baqir
9. Imam Ali Zayn al-Abidin
10. Imam Husayn al-Shahid
11. Imam Ali al-Murtada
12. Prophet Muhammad

==== From mother's side ====
1. Sayyid Ali al-Sharif al-Murtada
2. Sayyida Fatima
3. Sayyid Husayn
4. Sayyid Hasan al-Nasir al-Kabir
5. Sayyid Ali
6. Sayyid Hasan
7. Sayyid Ali
8. Sayyid Umar al-Ashraf
9. Imam Ali Zayn al-Abidin
10. Imam Husayn al-Shahid
11. Imam Ali al-Murtada
12. Prophet Muhammad

== Theology ==
Since he was the pupil of both Qadi Abd al-Jabbar the Mu'tazilite and al-Shaykh al-Mufid, he was influenced by both of them. He even criticised them.

=== Reason and Revelation ===
According to Sharif al-Murtada, the first part of religious duty is the obligation to reason to the knowledge of God. The other duties are dependent on this first duty. Al-Murtada along with the Mu'tazilite starting-point is the claim that man's first duty is to use his reason to arrive at the knowledge of God. Also in Kalam there is proof of the existence of God, he defended the atomist' stance versus that of the Aristotelian notion of substantial change.

=== God's attributes ===
He believed that we must not limit our-selves to applying those names mentioned in Quran.

== Death ==
Sayyid Murtaḍā acquired the epithet of: "ʿAlam al-Hudā" ("The banner of guidance"), and died at the age of 81 years in 1044 (436 AH).

== Work and Contribution ==
He was a multi-dimensional personality. All Shi'ite scholars acknowledge that Sayyid Murtaḍā was the greatest scholar of his era, and groomed many outstanding ulama (scholars), including the famous Shaykh al-Tūsī, the founder of the celebrated theological Center of Najaf. He served as "Naqīb al-Nuqabā'" after the death of his brother.

Sayyid Murtaḍā was deeply interested in fiqh, unlike Sayyid Raḍī, who was more inclined towards politics and literature,. He was considered a master of kalam, fiqh, usul al-fiqh, literature, grammar, poetry and other fields of knowledge. His divan or poetry collection has more than 20,000 verses.

Books authored by Sayyid Murtaḍā include:

- al-Dhakhīra fī Uṣūl al-Fiqh ( الذخيرة )
- al-Ghurar wa al-Durar ( الغرر والدرر )
- al-Intiṣār ( الانتصار )
- al-Shāfī ( الشافي )
- Tanzīh al-Anbiyāʾ ( تنزيه الأنبياء )
- Jumal al-ʿilm Wa al-ʿAmal.

== See also ==
- Fakhr al-Mulk
- Sayyid Raḍī
- Shaykh al-Mufīd
- Shaykh al-Tūsī
- Shaykh al-Sadūq
- Muḥammad al-Kulaynī
- Allāmah Majlisī
- Shaykh al-Ḥurr al-ʿĀmilī
