= Ibn Qulawayh =

Ibn Qulawayh ابن قولويه

Personal life
- Born: Baghdad
- Died: 978–79 AD
- Era: Islamic Golden Age
- Main interest: Hadith

Religious life
- Religion: Islam
- Denomination: Shia
- Creed: Twelver

Abu'l-Qasem Ja'far bin Moḥammad bin Jaʿfar bin Mūsā bin Qūlawayh Qomī Baḡdādī (Arabic: جعفر بن محمد بن جعفر بن موسى بن قولويه القمي البغدادي), also known as Ibn Qūlawayh (Persian: ابن قولویه) (died in Baghdad, 978 or 979 AD) was a Twelver Shia Muslim traditionist and jurist (faqīh). He is considered as one of the authoritative traditionists (transmitters of hadith) among Shia Muslims.

== Life ==
It seems that he began his education in Qom, and Abdullah Ash'ari may have been among his teachers. He traveled to other places to study the Hadith, including Iraq where he resided while he was ill. Many of his teachers also lived in Iraq, such as Ibn Idris Qomi, Ali Ibn Babawayh Qomi, Ibn Valid Qomi, Ibn Oqdah, Abu Omar Kashi, Abdul Aziz Ibn Yahya Jaloudi, Ibn Homam Iskafi and his father Muhammad and his brother Ali.

== Transmitters of Hadith ==
There are some bodies among transmitters of Hadith for Qulawayh like Ibn Abdoon, Ibn Ayyash Johari, Ibn Babawayh, Ibn Shazan Qomi, Ibn Nouh Sirafi, and Haroun Ibn Musa talakbari who are used by Qulawayh. About his reliability, we could say that Shaykh Mofid mentioned him as the reliable transmitter. Also Najasi And Tousi known him as reliable transmitter.

== Works ==
He has many books on the subject of Jurisprudence and Hadith. His most known book is Kamil Al Ziyyarat which is published in Najaf by Abdul Hosein Amini. This book an important source of Imami in Praying. It shows the interest in traditions in that time. Qulawayh narrated many traditions from Muhammad, Imam Kazim and Imam Sadiq and the chains of narrators. Many of his books are not available:

- Al Arbaeen
- History of months and its events
- Praying
- Witness
- Qiyyam Al Layl va Navader

== Death ==
He may be buried in Qom or Kazemayn.

== See also ==
- Shaykh Tusi
- Al-Shaykh Al-Mufid
- Fiqh Jaffaria
