= List of Maturidis =

Abu Mansur al-Maturidi, who was a leading theologian and jurist of his time in Transoxiana (Ma Wara' al-Nahr) in Central Asia, was the founder of the Māturīdiyya theological school. This was one of the two principal Sunni schools of Islamic theology (kalam). Māturīdi based his theological opinions and epistemological perspectives on the teachings of the school's eponymous founder, Abū Ḥanīfa al-Nuʿmān (8th century CE). Therefore, unlike Ash'arism, Māturīdite theology has generally remained associated exclusively with only one Sunni school of law (madhhab), that Hanafites.

According to Māturīdism, belief (ʾīmān) does neither increase nor decrease depending on observation of religious law. Instead, deeds follow from faith. Based on Surah Ṭā Hā (verse 112), if a Muslim does not perform the deeds prescribed by the Islamic law (sharīʿa), he is not considered an apostate as long as he doesn't deny his obligations.

Māturīdism holds that humans are creatures endowed with reason, which differentiates them from animals. The relationship between people and God differs from that of nature and God; humans are endowed with free-will, but due to God's sovereignty, God creates the acts the humans choose, so humans can perform them. Ethics can be understood just by rational thought and don't need prophetic guidance. Al-Māturīdī also considered the ḥadīth to be unreliable when they are at odds with reason. Because of that, Māturīdism has been associated with rationalistic theology.

- Al-Hakim al-Samarqandi (d. 342 AH)
- Abu Bakr al-Kalabadhi (d. 379 AH)
- Abu al-Layth al-Samarqandi (d. 375 AH)
- Abu Zayd al-Dabusi (d. 429 AH)
- Ali Hujwiri (d. 464 AH)
- Yūsuf Balasaguni (d. 469 AH)
- Ali al-Balkhi (d. 485 AH)
- Abu al-Yusr al-Bazdawi (d. 493 AH)
- Abu al-Mu'in al-Nasafi (d. 508 AH)
- Abu Ishaq al-Saffar al-Bukhari (d. 534 AH)
- Yusuf Hamadani (d. 535 AH)
- Sheikh Ahmad-e Jami (d. 536 AH)
- Najm al-Din 'Umar al-Nasafi (d. 537 AH)
- Ahmad Yasawi (d. 561 AH)
- Siraj al-Din al-Ushi (d. 575 AH)
- Nur al-Din al-Sabuni (d. 580 AH)
- Fatima al-Samarqandi (d. 581 AH)
- Al-Kasani (d. 587 AH)
- Jamal al-Din al-Ghaznawi (d. 593 AH)
- Abu al-Thana' al-Lamishi (d. beginning of the sixth century AH)
- Al-Mu'azzam 'Isa (d. 624 AH)
- Qutbuddin Bakhtiar Kaki (d. 632 AH)
- Mu'in al-Din Chishti (d. 633 AH)
- Saif ed-Din al-Boharsi (d. 659 AH)
- Fariduddin Ganjshakar (d. 664 AH)
- Rumi (d. 671 AH)
- Shams al-Din al-Samarqandi (d. after 690 AH)
- Abu al-Barakat al-Nasafi (d. 710 AH)
- Sultan Walad (d. 711 AH)
- Nizamuddin Auliya (d. 725 AH)
- Sadr al-Shari'a al-Asghar (d. 747 AH)
- Akmal al-Din al-Babarti (d. 786 AH)
- Baha' al-Din Naqshband (d. 791 AH)
- Kadi Burhan al-Din (d. 800 AH)
- Bande Nawaz (d. 825 AH)
- Shams al-Din al-Fanari (d. 834 AH)
- 'Ala' al-Din al-Bukhari (d. 841 AH)
- Yaqub al-Charkhi (d. 851 AH)
- Ahmad ibn Arabshah (d. 861 AH)
- Badr al-Din al-'Ayni (d. 855 AH)
- Al-Kamal ibn al-Humam (d. 861 AH)
- Khidr Bey (d. 863 AH)
- Ali al-Bistami (d. 874 AH)
- Khwaja Ahrar (d. 895 AH)
- Ali-Shir Nava'i (d. 906 AH)
- Husayn Kashifi (d. 910 AH)
- Ibn Kemal (d. 940 AH)
- Abdul Quddus Gangohi (d. 943 AH)
- Ibrahim al-Halabi (d. 955 AH)
- Muhammad Birgivi (d. 980 AH)
- Ebussuud Efendi (d. 982 AH)
- Khwaja Baqi Billah (d. 1011 AH)
- 'Ali al-Qari (d. 1014 AH)
- Hasan Kafi al-Aqhisari (d. 1025 AH)
- Ahmad Sirhindi (d. 1034 AH)
- Mahmud Hudayi (d. 1037 AH)
- 'Abd al-Haqq al-Dehlawi (d. 1052 AH)
- 'Abd al-Hakim al-Siyalkoti (d. 1067 AH)
- Wang Daiyu (d. around 1068 AH)
- Kâtip Çelebi (d. 1068 AH)
- Shihab al-Din al-Khafaji (d. 1069 AH)
- Khayr al-Din al-Ramli (d. 1081 AH)
- Ma Zhu (d. around 1123 AH)
- Ismail Haqqi Bursevi (d. 1127 AH)
- Shah Abdur Rahim (d. 1131 AH)
- Liu Zhi of Nanjing (d. 1158 AH, or 1178 AH)
- Nizamuddin Sihalivi (d. 1161 AH)
- Makhdoom Muhammad Hashim Thattvi (d. 1174 AH)
- 'Abd al-Ghani al-Nabulsi (d. 1176 AH)
- İbrahim Hakkı Erzurumi (d. 1193 AH)
- Mirza Mazhar Jan-e-Janaan (d. 1195 AH)
- Gelenbevi Ismail Efendi (d. 1204 AH)
- Murtada al-Zabidi (d. 1205 AH)
- Qadi Thanaullah Panipati (d. 1225 AH)
- Ghabdennasir Qursawi (d. 1226 AH)
- Ghulam Ali Dehlavi (d. 1239 AH)
- Shah Abdul Aziz (d. 1239 AH)
- Syed Ahmad Barelvi (d. 1246 AH)
- Ibn 'Abidin (d. 1252 AH)
- Muhammad 'Abid al-Sindi (d. 1257 AH)
- Mamluk Ali Nanautawi (d. 1267 AH)
- Fazl-e-Haq Khairabadi (d. 1278 AH)
- Yusuf Ma Dexin (d. 1291 AH)
- Muhammad Qasim Nanautavi (d. 1297 AH)
- Naqi Ali Khan (d. 1297 AH)
- 'Abd al-Ghani al-Maydani (d. 1298 AH)
- 'Abd al-Hayy al-Lucknawi (d. 1304 AH)
- Shihab al-Din al-Marjani (d. 1306 AH)
- Rahmatullah al-Kairanawi (d. 1308 AH)
- Ahmed Cevdet Pasha (d. 1312 AH)
- Imdadullah Muhajir Makki (d. 1317 AH)
- Abai Qunanbaiuly (d. 1321 AH)
- Rashid Ahmad Gangohi (d. 1322 AH)
- Ahmad Hasan Amrohi (d. 1330 AH)
- Muhammad Anwaarullah Farooqui (d. 1335 AH)
- Mahmud Hasan Deobandi (d. 1338 AH)
- Ahmed Raza Khan (d. 1340 AH)
- Shakarim Qudayberdiuli (d. 1344 AH)
- Abdul Bari Firangi Mahali (d. 1345 AH)
- Muhammad Ali Mungeri (d. 1346 AH)
- Khalil Ahmad Saharanpuri (d. 1346 AH)
- Anwar Shah Kashmiri (d. 1352 AH)
- Muhammad Bakhit al-Muti'i (d. 1354 AH)
- Fatma Aliye Topuz (d. 1354 AH)
- Meher Ali Shah (d. 1356 AH)
- Muhammed Hamdi Yazır (d. 1361 AH)
- Ashraf Ali Thanwi (d. 1361 AH)
- Hamid Raza Khan (d. 1361 AH)
- Ubaidullah Sindhi (d. 1364 AH)
- Amjad Ali Aazmi (d. 1367)
- Jamaat Ali Shah (d. 1951 CE)
- Naeem-ud-Deen Muradabadi (d. 1367 AH)
- Shabbir Ahmad Usmani (d. 1368 AH)
- Musa Bigiev (d. 1368 AH)
- Muhammad Zahid al-Kawthari (d. 1371 AH)
- Kifayatullah Dehlawi (d. 1371 AH)
- Süleyman Hilmi Tunahan (d. 1378 AH)
- Sardar Ahmad Chishti (d. 1382 AH)
- Mohammad Abdul Ghafoor Hazarvi (d. 1390 AH)
- Abdul Hamid Qadri Badayuni (d. 1390 AH)
- Ömer Nasuhi Bilmen (d. 1391 AH)
- Muhammad Abu Zahra (d. 1394 AH)
- Abdul Majid Daryabadi (d. 1397 AH)
- Muhammad Shafi (d. 1395 AH)
- Abul Wafa Al Afghani (d. 1395 AH)
- Muhammad Shafi (d. 1395 AH)
- Zakariyya Kandhlawi (d. 1402 AH)
- Mustafa Raza Khan (d. 1402 AH)
- Muhammad Tayyib Qasmi (d. 1403 AH)
- Muhammad Muslehuddin Siddiqui (d. 1403 AH)
- Habib al-Rahman al-'Azmi (d. 1412 AH)
- Muhammad Waqaruddin Qadri (d. 1414 AH)
- Muhammad Ayyub Ali (d. 1415 AH)
- Anzar Shah Kashmiri (d. 1428 AH)
- Muhammad Karam Shah al-Azhari (d. 1418 AH)
- Arshadul Qadri (d. 1423 AH)
- Shah Ahmad Noorani (d. 1423 AH)
- Abdul Latif Chowdhury Fultali (d. 1429 AH)
- Shah Turab ul Haq (d. 1438 AH)
- Akhtar Raza Khan (d. 1439 AH)
- Muhammad Salim Qasmi (d. 1439 AH)
- Saeed Ahmad Palanpuri (d. 1441 AH)
- Khadim Hussain Rizvi (d. 1442 AH)
- Muhammad Rafi' Usmani (d. 1443 AH)
- Abdur Rahman (scholar)
- Muhammad Tahir-ul-Qadri
- Taqi Usmani
- Ziaul Mustafa Razvi Qadri
- Muhammad Ilyas Qadri
- Asjad Raza Khan
- A F M Khalid Hossain
- Muzaffar Shah Qadri
- Raza Saqib Mustafai
- Junaid Babunagari
- Kaukab Noorani Okarvi
- Husein Kavazović
- Salah Mezhiev
- Amer Jamil
- Muhammad bin Yahya al-Ninowy

== Maturidi leaders ==
- Seljuq dynasty
- Ottoman dynasty
- Timurid dynasty
- Mughal dynasty
- Durrani Empire
- Alp Arslan (d. 465 AH)
- Nur al-Din Zengi (d. 569 AH)
- Al-Mu'azzam 'Isa (d. 624 AH)
- Mehmed the Conqueror (d. 886 AH)
- Aurangzeb (d. 1118 AH)
- Sultan Sarang Gakhar (d. 953 AH)
- Ottoman sultans
