= Al-Samarqandi =

al-Samarqandi (Arabic: السمرقندي) or Samarqandi (Persian: سمرقندی, Tajik: Самарқандӣ, Uzbek: Samarqandiy) is a nisba meaning "from Samarqand", a city in Central Asia, in modern Uzbekistan. It may refer to:

- Abd Allāh ibn ‘Abd ar-Raḥmān ad-Dārimi as-Samarqandī, known as al-Darimi, 9th-century Muslim scholar and imam
- Abu Bakr al-Samarqandi (died 268/881–2) a Sunni-Hanafi theologian who was polemicising against Ibn Karram's theology
- Abu Mansur al-Maturidi (853–944), also al-Samarqandi, 9th-century Sunni Hanafi jurist, theologian, and scriptural exegete
- Al-Hakim al-Samarqandi (died 342/953), student of al-Maturidi and qadi of Samarqand
- Abu al-Layth al-Samarqandi (died 373/983), Hanafi scholar
- Shams al-Din al-Samarqandi (died 702/1302), Hanafi-Maturidi theologian, astronomer and mathematician, author of al-Saha'if al-Ilahiyyah (Arabic: الصحائف الإلهية)
- Nizami Aruzi Samarqandi (fl. 1110–1161), 12th-century Persian poet and prose writer
- Fatima al-Samarqandi, 12th-century female Muslim scholar and jurist
- Suzani Samarqandi (died 1166), 12th-century Persian poet
- Abd-al-Razzāq Samarqandī (1413–1482), 15th-century Timurid chronicler and Islamic scholar
- Najib ad-Din Samarqandi (died 1222), 13th-century physician
- Athir al-Din al-Abhari, also al-Samaqandi, 13th-century philosopher, astronomer, astrologer and mathematician
- Qāzī Abd as-Salām Samarqandī, a 16-century scholar and father of the Sufi saint Khwaja Baqi Billah
- Sipandi Samarkandi (1829–1909), 19th-century Tajik bilingual poet
- Fitrat Zarduz Samarqandi (born 1657), Tajik poet
