= 'Ala' al-Din al-Bukhari =

Muslim theologian and mystic (b. 1377, d. 1438)

- علاء الدين البخاري
- Title: Sultan al-'Aimmah ("Sultan of the Imams")

Personal life
- Born: 779 A.H. = 1377 A.D. Bukhara
- Died: 841 A.H. = 1438 A.D. Mezzeh, Damascus
- Era: Islamic Golden Age
- Region: Transoxiana
- Main interest(s): Aqidah, Kalam (Islamic theology), Fiqh (Islamic jurisprudence), Usul al-Fiqh (principles of jurisprudence), Tafsir, Sufism, Literature, Rhetoric, Logic, and Dialectic
- Notable work(s): Muljimat al-Mujassima, Fadihat al-Mulhidin wa Nasihat al-Muwahhidin, "Kashful Asrar"

Religious life
- Religion: Islam
- Denomination: Sunni
- Jurisprudence: Hanafi
- Creed: Maturidi

Muslim leader
- Influenced by: Abu Hanifa Abu Mansur al-Maturidi Sa'd al-Din al-Taftazani
- Influenced: Ibn Hajar al-'Asqalani Badr al-Din al-'Ayni 'Abdullah al-Harari

'Ala' al-Din al-Bukhari (Arabic: علاء الدين البخاري), was a Hanafi jurist (faqih), Maturidi theologian, commentator of the Qur'an (mufassir), and a mystic (Sufi).

He is perhaps best known for issuing a fatwa (a legal ruling) whereby anyone that gives Ibn Taymiyya the title "Shaykh al-Islam" is a disbeliever, and authored a book against him entitled "Muljimat al-Mujassima" (Arabic: ملجمة المجسمة, lit. 'Curbing the Anthropomorphists').

Ibn Nasir al-Din al-Dimashqi (d. 846/1438) countered this fatwa by authoring Al-Radd al-Wafir 'ala man Za'am anna man Samma Ibn Taymiyya Shaykh al-Islam Kafir (Arabic: الرد الوافر على من زعم أن من سمى ابن تيمية شيخ الإسلام كافر), in which he listed all the authorities who had ever written in praise of Ibn Taymiyya or called him Shaykh al-Islam.

He was born in Persia in 779 A.H./1377 A.D., and grew up in Bukhara and later travelled extensively to India, Arabia, Egypt and Syria. After involving himself in debates in Cairo between supporters and opponents of Ibn 'Arabi, he moved to Damascus where he composed the "Fadihat al-Mulhidin wa Nasihat al-Muwahhidin" (Arabic: فاضحة الملحدين وناصحة الموحدين, lit. 'The Humiliation of the Heretics and Admonition of the Unitarians') and also proceeded to attack Ibn Taymiyya, to the anger of the city's Hanbalis.

He was praised by some scholars of his time, like Ibn Hajar al-'Asqalani, and Badr al-Din al-'Ayni.

== Life ==
He was born in Bilad al-'Ajam (Persia was often called Bilad al-'Ajam [land of 'Ajam]) and educated in Bukhara, where he studied under Sa'd al-Din al-Taftazani. It was from him that al-Bukhari inherited a profound dislike for monistic philosophy, which he saw as synonymous with Ibn 'Arabi and his followers. Al-Bukhari traveled widely in Iran and Central Asia searching for competent religious. From an early age he excelled in traditional and rational sciences such as the Qur'an, hadith, rhetoric, logic, poetry, and dialectics. He also studied classical Sufi manuals and was seen by many as an accomplished Sufi master. A well-rounded individual with broad intellectual horizons, al-Bukhari for some time resided in India, where his preaching and lectures earned him great popularity among Indian Muslims. Having favorably impressed a local ruler, al-Bukhari was invited to serve as his personal religious tutor and advisor. However, a man of principle, he soon fell out with his Indian patron and left the Subcontinent for Mecca, where he lived for several years until the Mamluk sultan Bars Bay (r. 825/1422-841/1438) invited him to the Egyptian capital. Soon after his arrival, he was embroiled in a vociferous public dispute over Ibn 'Arabi's orthodoxy, in the course of which he clashed with the influential Maliki qadi of Egypt, Muhammad al-Bisati (d. 842/1438), who advised caution in this matter. Following a public altercation with his opponent, an angry al-Bukhari took ostentatious leave of Cairo to the great chagrin of his Egyptian partisans.

In Syria, where he settled after his departure, al-Bukhari kept thinking about his "humiliation" at the hands of al-Bisati and composed a lengthy refutation of Ibn 'Arabi and his school, titled "Fadihat al-Mulhidin wa Nasihat al-Muwahhidin" (Arabic: فاضحة الملحدين وناصحة الموحدين, lit. 'The Humiliation of the Heretics and Admonition of the Unitarians') Or, in another translation: (transl. The Dishonoring of the Infidels and the Counseling of the Champions of God's Oneness). Simultaneously, he got himself involved in another fierce controversy. Ironically, this time his target was Ibn 'Arabi's archenemy, Ibn Taymiyya, whom al-Bukhari accused of certain juridical "innovations." Al-Bukhari's critique caused a great uproar in Syria that was home to many influential followers of Ibn Taymiyya. Unmindful of the wide opposition to his critique among his Syrian colleagues, al-Bukhari boldly demanded that Ibn Taymiyya be divested of his honorific title of shaykh al-Islam, proclaiming everyone who refused to do so an unbeliever. His condemnation of Ibn Taymiyya drew severe criticism and eventually a book-size refutation by the Shafi'i scholar Ibn Nasir al-Din al-Dimashqi (d. 838/1434)27 who sent his opus to Egyptian scholars for approval. As one might expect, upon receipt of this work, Muhammad al-Bisati seized the opportunity to denounce his former prosecutor as an ignoramus and troublemaker. Al-Bukhari's acrimonious polemic with the Syrian supporters of Ibn Taymiyya did not cause him to forget about his hostility to Ibn 'Arabi, whom he continued to accuse of heresy and juridical incompetence.

== See also ==
- Abu Ishaq al-Saffar al-Bukhari
- Abu al-Mu'in al-Nasafi
- Abu al-Yusr al-Bazdawi
- Nur al-Din al-Sabuni
- Muhammad Zahid al-Kawthari
- List of Hanafis
- List of Ash'aris and Maturidis
- List of Muslim theologians
- List of Sufis

Early Islamic scholars

Muhammad, The final Messenger of God (570–632) the Constitution of Medina, taught the Quran, and advised his companions
Abdullah ibn Masud (died 653) taught	Ali (607–661) fourth caliph taught	Aisha, Muhammad's wife and Abu Bakr's daughter taught	Abd Allah ibn Abbas (618–687) taught	Zayd ibn Thabit (610–660) taught	Umar (579–644) second caliph taught	Abu Hurairah (603–681) taught
Alqama ibn Qays (died 681) taught	Husayn ibn Ali (626–680) taught	Qasim ibn Muhammad ibn Abi Bakr (657–725) taught and raised by Aisha	Urwah ibn Zubayr (died 713) taught by Aisha, he then taught	Said ibn al-Musayyib (637–715) taught	Abdullah ibn Umar (614–693) taught	Abd Allah ibn al-Zubayr (624–692) taught by Aisha, he then taught
Ibrahim al-Nakha’i taught	Ali ibn Husayn Zayn al-Abidin (659–712) taught	Hisham ibn Urwah (667–772) taught	Ibn Shihab al-Zuhri (died 741) taught	Salim ibn Abd-Allah ibn Umar taught	Umar ibn Abdul Aziz (682–720) raised and taught by Abdullah ibn Umar
Hammad ibn Abi Sulayman taught	Muhammad al-Baqir (676–733) taught	Farwah bint al-Qasim Jafar's mother
Abu Hanifa (699–767) wrote Al Fiqh Al Akbar and Kitab Al-Athar, jurisprudence followed by Sunni, Sunni Sufi, Barelvi, Deobandi, Zaidiyyah and originally by the Fatimid and taught	Zayd ibn Ali (695–740)	Ja'far bin Muhammad Al-Baqir (702–765) Muhammad and Ali's great great grand son, jurisprudence followed by Shia, he taught	Malik ibn Anas (711–795) wrote Muwatta, jurisprudence from early Medina period now mostly followed by Maliki Sunnis in North Africa, and taught	Al-Waqidi (748–822) wrote history books like Kitab al-Tarikh wa al-Maghazi, student of Malik ibn Anas	Abu Muhammad Abdullah ibn Abdul Hakam (died 829) wrote biographies and history books, student of Malik ibn Anas
Abu Yusuf (729–798) wrote Usul al-fiqh	Muhammad al-Shaybani (749–805)	al-Shafi‘i (767–820) wrote Al-Risala, jurisprudence followed by Shafi'i Sunnis and Sufis, and taught	Ismail ibn Ibrahim	Ali ibn al-Madini (778–849) wrote The Book of Knowledge of the Companions	Ibn Hisham (died 833) wrote early history and As-Sirah an-Nabawiyyah, Muhammad's biography
Isma'il ibn Ja'far (719–775)	Musa al-Kadhim (745–799)	Ahmad ibn Hanbal (780–855) wrote Musnad Ahmad ibn Hanbal jurisprudence followed by Hanbali Sunnis and Sufis	Muhammad al-Bukhari (810–870) wrote Sahih al-Bukhari hadith books	Muslim ibn al-Hajjaj (815–875) wrote Sahih Muslim hadith books	Dawud al-Zahiri (815–883/4) founded the Zahiri school	Muhammad ibn Isa at-Tirmidhi (824–892) wrote Jami` at-Tirmidhi hadith books	Al-Baladhuri (died 892) wrote early history Futuh al-Buldan, Genealogies of the Nobles
Ibn Majah (824–887) wrote Sunan ibn Majah hadith book	Abu Dawood (817–889) wrote Sunan Abu Dawood Hadith Book
Muhammad ibn Ya'qub al-Kulayni (864- 941) wrote Kitab al-Kafi hadith book followed by Twelver Shia	Muhammad ibn Jarir al-Tabari (838–923) wrote History of the Prophets and Kings, Tafsir al-Tabari	Abu al-Hasan al-Ash'ari (874–936) wrote Maqālāt al-islāmīyīn, Kitāb al-luma, Kitāb al-ibāna 'an usūl al-diyāna
Ibn Babawayh (923–991) wrote Man La Yahduruhu al-Faqih jurisprudence followed by Twelver Shia	Sharif Razi (930–977) wrote Nahj al-Balagha followed by Twelver Shia	Nasir al-Din al-Tusi (1201–1274) wrote jurisprudence books followed by Ismaili and Twelver Shia	Al-Ghazali (1058–1111) wrote The Niche for Lights, The Incoherence of the Philosophers, The Alchemy of Happiness on Sufism	Rumi (1207–1273) wrote Masnavi, Diwan-e Shams-e Tabrizi on Sufism
Key: Some of Muhammad's Companions	Key: Taught in Medina	Key: Taught in Iraq	Key: Worked in Syria	Key: Travelled extensively collecting the sayings of Muhammad and compiled books of hadith	Key: Worked in Persia
