= Sharh al-'Aqa'id al-Nasafiyya =

Book by al-Taftazani

- Editor: Mufti Afzal Hoosen Elias
- Authors: Najm al-Din 'Umar al-Nasafi, Sa'd al-Din al-Taftazani
- Original title: شرح العقائد النسفية
- Translator: Muhammad Huzaifah ibn Adam aal-Ebrahim
- Language: Arabic
- Subject: 'Aqidah (Islamic creed), Kalam (Islamic scholastic theology), Usul al-Din (Principles of Religion), Tawhid (Islamic monotheism)
- Publisher: Mustafah Publishers
- Publication date: 2018
- Pages: 342
- ISBN: 9789697520381

Sharh al-'Aqa'id al-Nasafiyya (Arabic: شرح العقائد النسفية) is a commentary written by the Hanafi-Shafi'i scholar al-Taftazani (d. 791/1389 or 792/1390) on the creed of Najm al-Din 'Umar al-Nasafi's Al-Aqaid al-Nasafiyya, an authoritative compendium on Islamic Sunni theology that remained a standard textbook in Ottoman schools. The book is a commentary on al-Nasafi's treatise, in which al-Nasafi systematized Hanafi-Maturidi theology. However, al-Taftazani adopted an Ash'ari perspective in his commentary.

== 'Aqā'id al-Nasafī ==
'Aqā'id al-Nasafi, a short summary of the authentic Muslim beliefs by Najm al-Din 'Umar al-Nasafi. 'Aqā'id is the plural of 'aqidah, which means, religious belief, creed, or theology. This short treatise has gained much popularity and acceptance amongst the Islamic community because of its comprehensive summary of the beliefs of Islam.

In this work, Najm al-Din 'Umar al-Nasafi closely followed Abu al-Mu'in al-Nasafi's formulations in his Tabsirat al-Adilla.

Al-Nasafi compiled and enumerated some 60 points of belief, each one of them being established directly or indirectly by a Qur'anic verse or an authentic Hadith. Although written from the perspective of the Maturidi school of theology, there is a consensus about all the fundamental beliefs mentioned in its pages amongst the Sunni scholars and they have only differed on a few of the subsidiary issues dealt with in this work. Many commentaries have been written on this work differing in size; among them are:

- Al-Durra Sharh 'Aqa'id al-Nasafi (Arabic: الدرة شرح عقائد النسفي) by Ibn al-Nafis (d. 687/1288).
- Sharh al-'Aqa'id al-Nasafiyya (Arabic: شرح العقائد النسفية) by Shams al-Din Abu al-Thana' al-Isfahani (d. 749/1348).
- Al-Qala'id Sharh al-'Aqa'id (Arabic: القلائد شرح العقائد) by Jamal al-Din al-Qunawi (d. 770/1369).

One of the most popular was the commentary written by Sa'd al-Din al-Taftazani (d. 792/1390). Since then, it has been taught in Islamic schools and seminaries throughout the world, particularly in Central and South Asia.

In 1988, Syed Naquib al-Attas put forward the 'Aqā'id al-Nasafi manuscript as the oldest Malay manuscript with the date of authorship established as 1590 CE (998 AH), during the era of Sultan Alauddin Riayat Syah's rule in Aceh (1589–1604). Like most religious manuscripts in the early stages, this manuscript was a translation from Arabic to Malay and this text was written in both languages, with the translated text written below the lines of the original text in Arabic.

== Al-Taftazani's commentary ==
Book cover of Sharh al-'Aqa'id al-Nasafiyya by al-Taftazani (d. 792/1390) with the Takhrij of its Hadiths by Jalal al-Din al-Suyuti (d. 911/1505).

Al-Taftazani started the book by praising Ash'aris after criticizing the Mu'tazilis. Part of his intention when he wrote this commentary was to thoroughly refute the Ahl al-Batil (the people of falsehood), such as the Mu'tazila, the Karramiyya, the Khawarij, the Philosophers, etc. Though his commentary in parts reflects an Ash'ari-Maturidi synthesis, the main framework was Ash'ari theology.

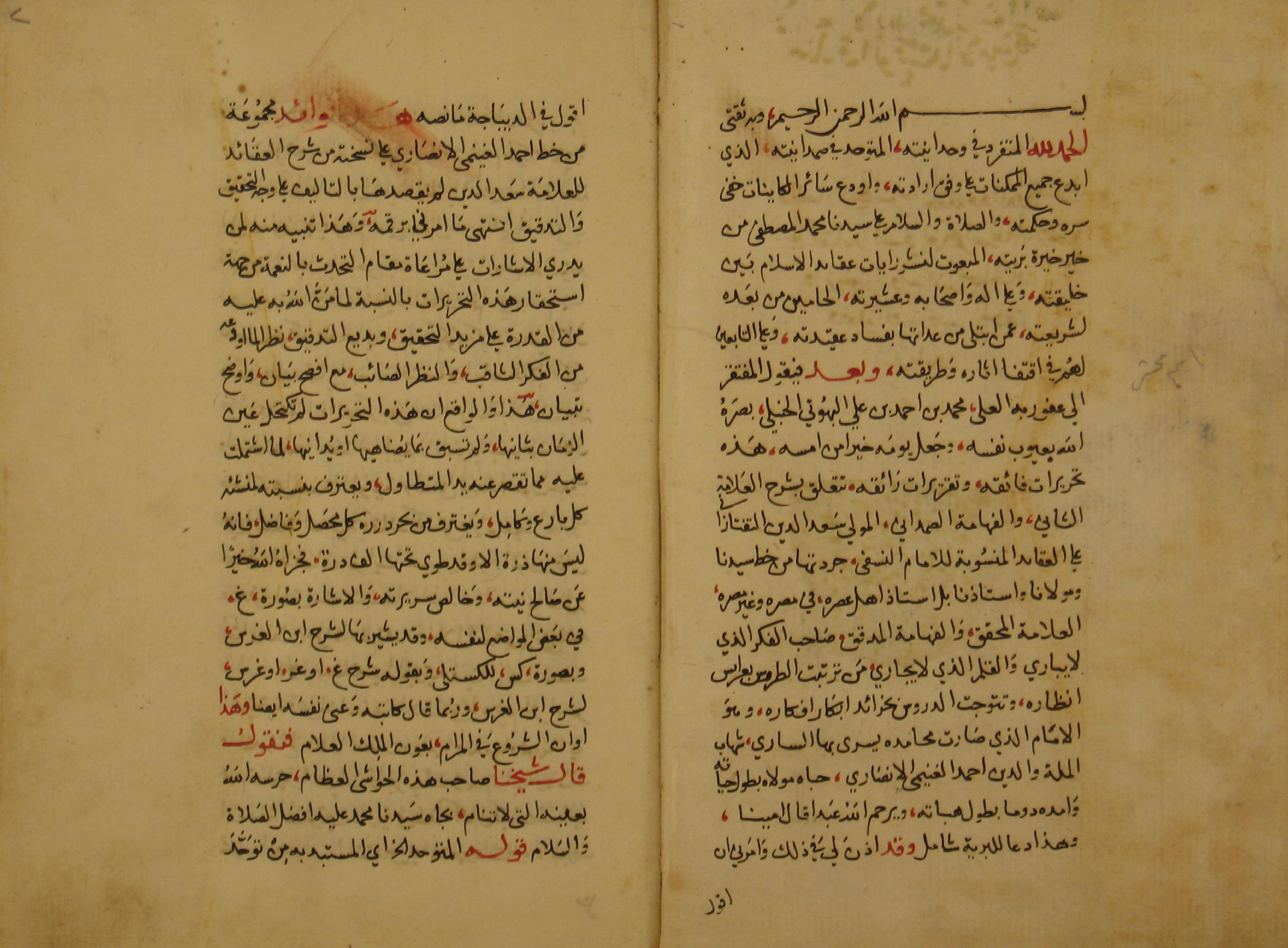
Arabic manuscript of Muhammad b. Ahmad b. 'Ali al-Buhuti al-Hanbali (d. 1088/1678)'s commentary on the Sharh al-'Aqa'id al-Nasafiyya by al-Taftazani (d. 792/1390).

Al-Taftazani's commentary is the oldest manuscript copied on the territory of Macedonia. The scribe Muhammad ibn Sinan mentioned that he had copied it in Skopje, in the madrasa (school) of Isa Bey, in 926/1519.

There have been many scholars and theologians who have written glosses and notes on al-Taftazani's commentary, among them are the following:

- 'Izz al-Din ibn Jama'a (d. 819/1416).
- Ahmad b. Musa al-Khayali (d. after 862/1458).
- Burhan al-Din al-Biqa'i (d. 885/1480), entitled al-Nukat wa al-Fawa'id 'ala Sharh al-'Aqa'id.
- Hasan Chelebi b. Muhammad Shah al-Fanari (d. 886/1481).
- Ibn al-Ghurs (d. 894/1489). He wrote two commentaries, one long and the other short.
- Muslih al-Din al-Qastallani, better known as al-Kastali (d. 901/1495).
- Kamal al-Din ibn Abi Sharif (d. 905/1499-1500), entitled al-Fara'id fi Hall Sharh al-'Aqa'id.
- Ibn Qasim al-Ghazzi (d. 918/1522).
- Shaykh al-Islām Zakariyya al-Ansari (d. 926/1520), entitled Fath al-Ilah al-Majid bi-Idhah Sharh al-'Aqa'id.
- Ramadan Efendi (d. 979/1571).
- 'Isam al-Din al-Isfarayini (d. 943/1536-7 or 951/1543-4).
- Ahmad al-Maqqari (d. 1041/1631), entitled Ida'at al-Dujunna fi 'Aqa'id Ahl al-Sunna.
- Ibrahim al-Laqqani (d. 1041/1631).
- 'Abd al-Hakim al-Siyalkuti (d. 1067/1657).
- Muhammad b. Ahmad b. 'Ali al-Buhuti al-Khalwati al-Hanbali (d. 1088/1678), the student of Mansur al-Buhuti (d. 1051/1641) and also his nephew and son-in-law.
- Ilyas al-Kurani (d. 1138/1726).
- Sulayman ibn 'Umar al-Jamal (d. 1204/1790).
- Muhammad b. Ahmad b. 'Arafa al-Disūqī (d. 1230/1815).
- Muhammad 'Abd al-'Aziz al-Farhari al-Multani (d. 1239/1824).
- Diya' al-Din Khalid al-Baghdadi (d. 1242/1827), the founder of the Khalidi branch of the Naqshbandi order.
- Ibrahim al-Bajuri (d. 1276/1859).
- Hasan b. al-Sayyid 'Abd al-Qadir al-Juri (d. 1322/1909).

The number of glosses (hawashi) on al-Taftazani's commentary on al-Nasafi's creed has reached around 82.

=== Takhrij ===
Ibn Qutlubugha (d. 879/1474), Jalal al-Din al-Suyuti (d. 911/1505), and Mulla 'Ali al-Qari (d. 1014/1606) have performed the Takhrij process of Hadiths (Note: Takhrij al-Hadith is the science of identifying and locating references and origins of Prophetic narrations.) that are mentioned in Sharh al-'Aqa'id al-Nasafiyya to identify its source and status.

== Modern commentators ==
- 'Abdullah al-Harari (d. 1429/2008).
- Abdul-Malik al-Saadi.
- 'Abd al-Salam ibn 'Abd al-Hadi Shannar.
- Nidal Ibrahim Alah Rashi (Arabic: نضال إبراهيم آله رشي).

== Translations ==
=== English ===
- A Commentary on the Creed of Islam: Sa'd al-Din al-Taftazani on the Creed of Najm al-Din al-Nasafi, translated with introduction and notes by Earl Edgar Elder, New York: Columbia University Press, and London: Oxford University Press, 1950.
- Islamic Creeds: A Selection (The New Edinburgh Islamic Surveys). Translated by William Montgomery Watt. Edinburgh: Edinburgh University Press. 1994. ISBN 9780748605224.
- The Five Pillars of Islam: Laying the Foundations of Divine Love and Service to Humanity. Translated by Musharraf Hussain. Leicestershire, UK: Kube Publishing. 2012. ISBN 9781847740540.
- Al-Taftazani (2018). Mufti Afzal Hoosen Elias (ed.). Sharh al-'Aqeedah an-Nasafiyyah (A Commentary on the Creed of Imaam an-Nasafi). Translated by Mufti Muhammad Huzaifah Ibn Adam aal-Ebrahim. Pakistan: Mustafah Publishers. ISBN 9789697520381.

=== German ===
- Abd al-Hafidh Wentzel, ed. (2017). Die Glaubenssätze des Imām al-Nasafī. Translated by Furkan Polat. Warda Publikationen Wentzel. ISBN 9783939191148.

=== Malay ===
- The Malay translation of al-Taftazani's commentary on al-Nasafi's essay on beliefs was written by Nur al-Din al-Raniri (d. 1068/1658) before 1637. It was probably written in Pahang, before his arrival in Aceh. The work is entitled Durrat al-Fara'id bi Sharh al-'Aqa'id (Arabic: درة الفرائض بشرح العقائد).
- Al-Taftazani (2017). Huraian al-Aqaid al-Nasafiyyah. Translated by Mohamad Hilmi Marjunit; Anwar Yusof; Farhan Affandi. Inisiatif Buku Darul Ehsan (IBDE). ISBN 9789671441893.

=== Persian ===
- 'Aqa'id al-Nasafi (Persian: عقائد نسفی), translated into Persian by Muhammad 'Umar Joya.

=== Russian ===
- Толкование акиды «Ан-Насафия» (Шарх ан-насафиййа фи-л-‘акида ал-исламиййа). Книга написана современным иракским ученым, профессором богословия ‘Абд ал-Маликом ас-Са‘ди. Translated from Arabic by Adygamov Ramil Kamilovich, Candidate of Historical Sciences, Associate Professor, Senior Researcher of the Department of History of Religion and Social thought, S. Mardzhani Institute of History of Academy of Sciences of the Republic of Tatarstan.

=== Turkish ===
- Al-Taftazani (1980). Kelâm İlmi ve İslâm Akâidi (Şerhu'l-Akâid). Translated by Süleyman Uludağ. Istanbul: Dergâh Yayınları. ISBN 9789759954376.
- Al-Taftazani (2008). Şerhul Akaid-i Nesefî Tercümesi (Arapça Metin ve İzahat). Translated by Ali Haydar Doğan. Istanbul: Yasin Yayınevi. ISBN 9786054184538.
- Al-Taftazani (2017). Şerhu'l Akâid. Translated by Talha Hakan Alp. Istanbul: Marmara University Faculty of Theology Foundation Publications. ISBN 9789755484204.
- Al-Taftazani (2018). Kelime Manalı, İzahlı Şerh'ül-Akaid Tercümesi. Translated by Hüsamettin Vanlıoğlu; Abdullah Hiçdönmez; Fatih Kalender; Emin Ali Yüksel. Istanbul: Muallim Neşriyat. ISBN 9786054709694.

=== Urdu ===
- Nashr al-Fawa'id Khulasah Sharh al-'Aqa'id, by Ubaidul Haq Jalalabadi.
- Khulasah Sharh al-'Aqa'id, by Ibn Habib al-Faiz.
- Nazm al-'Aqa'id al-Nasafiyya, by Muhammad Salman Faridi al-Misbahi.
- Kashf al-Fara'id li-hal Sharh al-'Aqa'id: a gloss on al-Taftazani's commentary by Mufti Muhammad Aslam Azizi al-Misbahi.

== Gallery ==
Al-Nukat wa al-Fawa'id 'ala Sharh al-'Aqa'id (Arabic: النكت والفوائد على شرح العقائد) by Burhan al-Din al-Biqa'i (d. 885/1480)

Al-Fara'id fi Hall Sharh al-'Aqa'id (Arabic: الفرائد في حل شرح العقائد) by Kamal al-Din ibn Abi Sharif (d. 905/1499-1500)

Fath al-Ilah al-Majid bi-Idhah Sharh al-'Aqa'id (Arabic: فتح الإله الماجد بإيضاح شرح العقائد) by Zakariyya al-Ansari (d. 926/1520)

== See also ==
- Al-Fiqh al-Akbar
- Al-'Aqida al-Tahawiyya
- Kitab al-Tawhid
- Al-Insaf fima Yajib I'tiqaduh
- A Guide to Conclusive Proofs for the Principles of Belief
- The Moderation in Belief
- Asas al-Taqdis
- List of Sunni books
