= Al-Hakim al-Samarqandi =

10th-century Samarkand Sunni-Hanafi scholar, judge and sage

Al-Hakim al-Samarqandi الحكيم السمرقندي
- Title: Al-Hakim (The Wise One)

Personal life
- Born: Unknown [c. 874 A.D.]
- Died: 342 A.H. = 953 A.D. 345 A.H. = 956 A.D. Samarqand
- Era: Islamic Golden Age
- Region: Transoxiana
- Main interest(s): Sufism, Aqidah, Kalam (Islamic theology), Fiqh (Islamic jurisprudence), Tafsir, Hikmah (Wisdom)
- Notable work: al-Sawad al-A'zam

Religious life
- Religion: Islam
- Denomination: Sunni
- Jurisprudence: Hanafi
- Creed: Maturidi

Muslim leader
- Influenced by: Abu Hanifa Abu Mansur al-Maturidi Abu Bakr al-Warraq
- Influenced: Abu al-Mu'in al-Nasafi Abu Sa'd al-Sam'ani

Al-Hakim Abu al-Qasim Ishaq al-Samarqandi (Arabic: الحكيم أبو القاسم إسحاق السمرقندي), was a Sunni-Hanafi scholar, qadi (judge), and sage from Transoxania who studied Sufism in Balkh with Abu Bakr al-Warraq. Some sources describe him as a student of al-Maturidi (d. 333/944-45) in fiqh and kalam.

He was proficient in kalam and authored a Hanafi creedal statement that insists on the need for obedience to any duly appointed ruler. The creed criticizes the harsh asceticism of the Karramiyya (Note: An early Muslim sect accused of anthropomorphism and corporealism.) and accepts traditional views of saintly marvels (karamat).

Abu al-Qasim's life marked a turning-point in the formation of the ascetic doctrines and teachings of Hanafi Sunnis in the east, and his al-Sawad al-A'zam (Arabic: السواد الأعظم) was for a long time a major reference source on doctrine for many Hanafis-Maturidis. Although it is not yet clear whether al-Hakim was a disciple of al-Maturidi, or whether his handbook was a mere traditional document on Hanafite doctrine.

== Name ==
Abu al-Qasim Ishaq b. Muhammad b. Isma'il b. Ibrahim b. Zayd al-Hakim al-Samarqandi.

== Birth ==
His exact date of birth is unknown, although some modern biographers place the date to sometime around 260/874.

== Life ==
Little is known about his life. He lived from the end of the 3rd/9th to the first half of the 4th/10th century.

== Death ==
He died in Samarkand and was buried at Jakardiza (Arabic: جاكرديزه), a place reserved for prominent scholars and persons of nobility. The date of his death is uncertain, some placing it in 340 AH, others in 342 AH, and others in 345 AH. And it was being said in 402 AH.

Abu al-Mu'in al-Nasafi (d. 508/1114) has praised him in his book Tabsirat al-Adilla, and according to him, the date of his death was 335 AH.

== See also ==
- Abu Bakr al-Samarqandi
- Abu al-Layth al-Samarqandi
- Shams al-Din al-Samarqandi
- List of Hanafis
- List of Sufis
- List of Muslim theologians
- List of Maturidis
