= Talkhis al-Adilla =

Sunni theological treatise

- Editor: 'Abd Allah Muhammad 'Abd Allah Isma'il (Note: He holds a PhD from Goethe University Frankfurt in Germany, and the Faculty of Fundamentals of Religion at Al-Azhar University in Cairo, Egypt.)
- Author: Abu Ishaq al-Saffar al-Bukhari
- Original title: تلخيص الأدلة لقواعد التوحيد
- Language: Arabic
- Subject: 'Aqidah (Islamic creed), Kalam (Islamic theology)
- Publisher: Al-Maktaba al-Azhariyya lil-Turath
- Publication date: 2016
- Publication place: Cairo, Egypt
- An important source of the Maturidi school of Sunni theology.

Talkhis al-Adilla li-Qawa'id al-Tawhid (Turkish: Telhisü'l-Edille li-Kavâidi't-Tevhid; Arabic: تلخيص الأدلة لقواعد التوحيد, lit. 'A Summary of the Proofs for the Foundations/Principles of Tawhid [Islamic concept of Monotheism, Oneness of God]'; German: Das Kompendium der Beweise für die Grundlagen des Ein-Gott-Glaubens) is a Sunni theological treatise on the Hanafi scholastic speculative theology (kalam), written by the Maturidi theologian al-Saffar al-Bukhari (d. 534/1139) as a defence of Sunni teachings against heretics, such as the Karramites (Karrāmiyya), Kharijites (Khawarij), Qadarites (Qadariyya), and Jahmites (Jahmiyya).

== Content ==
Al-Saffar explains many issues, particularly those related to the existence, oneness and attributes of Allah, based on more than 175 Divine Names of God (al-Asma' al-Husna).

== See also ==
- Tabsirat al-Adilla
- Kitab al-Tawhid
- Al-Sawad al-A'zam
- List of Sunni books
