= Siraj al-Din al-Ushi =

12th c. Hanafi Sunni theologian

Siraj al-Din al-Ushi سراج الدين الأوشي
- Title: Imam al-Haramayn ("the Imam of the two Sanctuaries")

Personal life
- Born: Osh, Kyrgyzstan
- Died: 575 A.H. = 1179–80 A.D.
- Era: Islamic Golden Age
- Region: Turkestan, Transoxiana (Central Asia)
- Main interest(s): Aqidah, Kalam (Islamic theology), Fiqh (Islamic jurisprudence), Hadith studies
- Notable work(s): Bad' al-Amali, Al-Fatawa al-Sirajiyyah

Religious life
- Religion: Islam
- Denomination: Sunni
- Jurisprudence: Hanafi
- Creed: Maturidi

Muslim leader
- Influenced by: Abu Hanifa Abu Mansur al-Maturidi Najm al-Din 'Umar al-Nasafi
- Influenced: Ali al-Qari 'Izz al-Din ibn Jama'ah Ibn Nujaym Ibn 'Abidin Al-Haskafi Ibn Qutlubgha

Siraj al-Din 'Ali ibn 'Uthman al-Ushi al-Farghani (Arabic: سراج الدين علي بن عثمان الأوشي الفرغاني) was a Hanafi jurist, Maturidi theologian, hadith expert (muhaddith), Chief Judge or Supreme Judge (Qadi al-Qudah or 'Aqda al-Qudah as he was also called), and researcher who has ferreted out facts and established them (muhaqqiq). He is probably best known for his work on a confession of faith in rhyme entitled al-Qasida al-Lamiyya fi al-Tawhid, also called Bad' al-Amali or from the opening words Qasidat Yaqulu al-'Abd.

== Birth ==
He was born or lived in Osh (Ush), by the Ferghana Valley (Ush in today's Kyrgyzstan) and hence his demonym al-Ushi.

== Books ==
His well known writings include:

- Al-Fatawa al-Sirajiyyah (Arabic: الفتاوى السراجية).
- Bad' al-Amali (Arabic: بدء الأمالي).
- Ghurar al-Akhbar wa Durar al-Ash'ar (Arabic: غرر الأخبار ودرر الأشعار), abstract Nisab al-Akhbar li-Tadhkirat al-Akhyar (Arabic: نصاب الأخبار لتذكرة الأخيار), 1000 short traditions in 100 chapters.

== Death ==
He died at the end of the 6th /12th century, after 569 AH (1173/4 AD), specifically in 575/1179–80.

== See also ==
- Abu Hanifa
- Abu Mansur al-Maturidi
- Abu al-Mu'in al-Nasafi
- Abu al-Yusr al-Bazdawi
- Nur al-Din al-Sabuni
- Akmal al-Din al-Babarti
- Badr al-Din al-Ayni
- Ali al-Qari
- Khidr Bey
- Murtada al-Zabidi
- Muhammad Zahid al-Kawthari
- List of Hanafis
- List of Muslim theologians
- List of Ash'aris and Maturidis
