= Abu al-Mu'in al-Nasafi Memorial Complex =

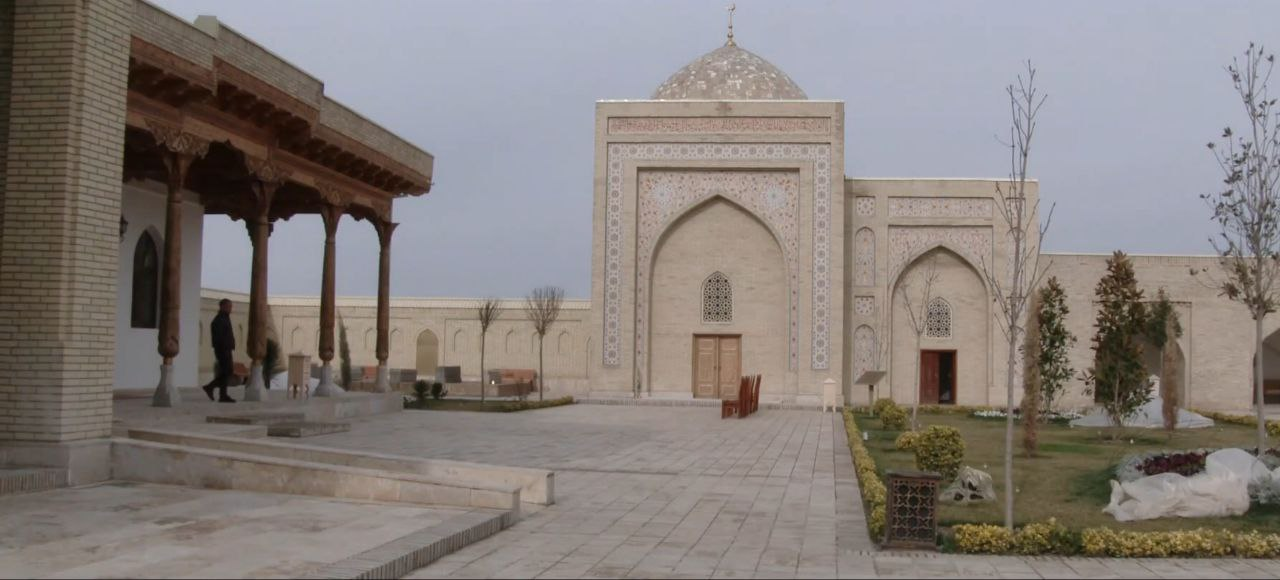

General information
- Location: Kovchin village, Qarshi District, Qashqadaryo Region, Uzbekistan
- Construction started: 10th century
- Completed: 11th century
- Renovated: 2021
- Owner: State Property

Abu al-Mu'in al-Nasafi Memorial Complex is a cultural heritage object in Uzbekistan. This object was completed during the X-XI centuries. The complex is located in Kovchin village, Qarshi District, Qashqadaryo Region. The facility is a state property and is implemented on the basis of operational management rights to the Abu Muin Nasafi Complex Management and Development Directorate. By the decision of the Cabinet of Ministers of the Republic of Uzbekistan on October 4, 2019, it was included in the national list of real estate objects of tangible cultural heritage – received state protection.

== History ==
In the Mu'in al-Nasafi Memorial Complex, there is a well dating back to the 11th century and an old mosque built in the 13th century. Today, a new mosque, a library, an administration building and a museum have been built in the complex. In this museum, the life and works of Abu Mu'in al-Nasafi are presented through multimedia tools. Also, the original copy of the Holy Qur'an written on ancient Samarkand paper and verses woven into fabric are museum exhibits. The Qur'an was written in the Arabic language and Nastaliq script in the 17th century. It was found in 1968 between the walls of the mausoleum. The museum consists of 11 departments. The library was built next to the museum. During the restoration of the mausoleum of Abu Mansur al-Maturidi, the graves of many Islamic scholars were found. Rough stones were used as tombstones for their graves. It is known that most of the identified grave owners lived during the Karakhanids period.

In the area of the mausoleum, researches were conducted by B. Bobojonov, A. Mominov, U. Rudolph, scholars of Islam from the Institute of Archeology of the Academy of Sciences of Uzbekistan. According to the results of research, Chokardiza cemetery was found near the mausoleum. A total of 100 stones were found here.

The complex reopened in October 2021 after reconstruction. A museum has been established in the shrine, where historical monuments from Shahrisabz are kept.

== See also ==
- Abu al-Mu'in al-Nasafi
- Khoja Kurban Madrasah (Qarshi)
- Imam Maturidi International Scientific Research Center
- Abi al-Hasan al-Ash'ari Center for Theological Studies and Research
