= Abu al-Thana' al-Lamishi =

11th-century Uzbekistani Hanafi-Maturidi scholar

أبو الثناء اللامِشي Abu al-Thana' al-Lamishi
- Title: Shaykh al-Islam

Personal life
- Died: early 6th century A.H. = beginning of the 12th century A.D. Samarqand, Uzbekistan
- Era: Islamic Golden Age
- Region: Ma Wara' al-Nahr (the land which lies beyond the river), Transoxiana (Central Asia)
- Main interest(s): Aqidah, Kalam (Islamic theology), Tawhid, Fiqh (Islamic jurisprudence), Usul al-Fiqh, Logic
- Notable work(s): Kitab al-Tamhid li-Qawa'id al-Tawhid, Kitab fi Usul al-Fiqh

Religious life
- Religion: Islam
- Denomination: Sunni
- Jurisprudence: Hanafi
- Creed: Maturidi

Muslim leader
- Influenced by: Abu Hanifa Abu Mansur al-Maturidi Abu al-Mu'in al-Nasafi Al-Hakim al-Tirmidhi

Abu al-Thana' Mahmud b. Zayd al-Lamishi (Arabic: أبو الثناء محمود بن زيد اللامِشي) was a Hanafi-Maturidi scholar from Transoxiana, who was alive in the late 5th and early 6th Islamic centuries.

== Biography ==
Very little is known about his life. Despite the value of his books, is not known for his publications and the books of tabaqat do not give much detail regarding his life. He was from a place called Lamish in Fergana (Uzbekistan), and was known as Shaykh al-Islam.

== Birth ==
His date of birth is unknown, but it was reported that he was alive in 539 AH.

== Teachers ==
It is sometimes assumed that he was a student of Imam Abu al-Mu'in al-Nasafi, though this is not known for sure. He has quoted some sayings from Tabsirat al-Adilla by Abu al-Mu'in al-Nasafi (d. 508/1115).

== Books ==
His published books include:

- Kitab al-Tamhid li-Qawa'id al-Tawhid (Arabic: كتاب التمهيد لقواعد التوحيد, lit. 'Introductory Work for the Rules Concerning Monotheism'), is considered one of the most important books of the Maturidi theology.
- Kitab fi Usul al-Fiqh (Arabic: كتاب في أصول الفقه), is unique amongst works of the usul al-fiqh genre of literature. Unlike other texts, it is arranged more like a glossary and less in accordance with the classic scheme of subject-division in usul books.

== Death ==
His date of death is uncertain, but some reported that he died at the age of 81 during the month of Ramadan 522 A.H. (1128 A.C.). But this is unlikely, because he was alive in 539 AH. Another, more likely, date for his death is given as in the early sixth century A.H./twelfth century C.E., which would make more sense.

== See also ==
- List of Hanafis
- List of Ash'aris and Maturidis
- List of Muslim theologians
