= Tafsir al-Maturidi =

Classic text by Abu Mansur al-Maturidi

Ta'wilat al-Qur'an
- Editor: Ahmet Vanlıoğlu
- Author: Abu Mansur al-Maturidi
- Original title: Ta'wilat al-Qur'an (also Ta'wilat Ahl al-Sunna)
- Translator: Translated into Turkish by Bekir Topaloğlu, Mehmet Erdoğan, İbrahim Tüfekçi, S. Kemal Sandıkçı, Fadıl Ayğan, Yunus Vehbi Yavuz
- Cover artist: Halil Yılmaz
- Language: Arabic, Turkish
- Subject: Tafsir
- Publisher: Mizan Yayınevi, Ensar Neşriyat
- Publication place: Ma Wara' al-Nahr (the land which lies beyond the river), Transoxiana (Central Asia)
- Followed by: Kitab al-Tawhid

Ta'wilat Ahl al-Sunna (Arabic: تأويلات أهل السنة, romanized: Taʾwīlāt ʾAhl al-Sunna, lit. 'Interpretations of the People of the Sunna'), commonly known as Tafsir al-Maturidi (Arabic: تفسير الماتريدي, romanized: Tafsīr al-Māturīdī), is a classical Sunni tafsir (Qur'anic exegesis), written by the famed theologian Abu Mansur al-Maturidi (d. 333/944), who was a contemporary of al-Tabari.

Al-Maturidi prefers to combine the traditional and rational sources. Consequently, it can be identified as the exegesis that amalgamates traditional exegesis (Tafsir bi al-Ma'thur — which is interpretation based on tradition or text) with rational exegesis (Tafsir bi al-Ra'y — which is exegesis based on independent opinion).

Al-Maturidi often indicates what the theological or sectarian issues at stake in debates over the meanings of a given verse or passage of scripture. He defended wisely, reasonably and strongly the doctrinal views of Ahl al-Sunnah wa al-Jama'ah on the valid basis available in the Qur'an.

According to a later commentator on this work, 'Alā' al-Din Ahmad b. Muhammad Abu Bakr al-Samarqandi (d. around 540/1145), al-Maturidi did not write the Ta'wilat himself; rather, it is a compilation of his teachings that was prepared by his students. This is possible, as in some parts of the text the line of argument is rather convoluted and repetitious and does not appear to have been composed by a single author.

== See also ==
- List of tafsir works
- List of Sunni books
