= Al-Sawad al-A'zam =

Book by al-Hakim al-Samarqandi

Al-Radd 'ala Ashab al-Hawa (Arabic: الرد على أصحاب الهوى, Refutation of Those Holding Heretical Views), better known as al-Sawad al-A'zam 'ala Madhhab al-Imam al-A'zam Abi Hanifa (Arabic: السواد الأعظم على مذهب الإمام الأعظم أبى حنيفة, The Vast Majority of People Who Follow the Teaching of the greatest Imam Abu Hanifa), is a book written by al-Hakim al-Samarqandi, and is considered as the oldest theological work in accordance with the Maturidite school, after Kitab at-Tawhid (The Book of Monotheism) by Abu Mansur al-Maturidi. (Note: According to Aiyub Palmer in his book (Sainthood and Authority in Early Islam): al-Sawad al-A'zam shows no signs of al-Maturidi's influence. There is no mention of hikma as an overarching principle, nor does al-Sawad al-A'zam align to the new creedal structure that al-Maturidi inaugurates that distinguished between ilahiyyat (points of doctrine on Godhood), and nubuwwat (doctrines relating to prophecy). If al-Sawad al-A'zam was indeed part of al-Maturidi's School, it would surely have incorporated at least some of these elements. Finally, the date of authorship of al-Sawad al-A'zam suggested by Lewinstein makes it more probably that it was authored either before or at nearly the same time as al-Maturidi's Kitab at-Tawhid. It seems that the motivation to place al-Sawad al-A'zam after Kitab at-Tawhid may derive from the death date of al-Hakim al-Samarqandi falling after that of al-Maturidi; however, death dates are notoriously difficult to prove accurately, especially when dealing with contemporaries or near contemporaries in this time period.)

== Contents ==
In it al-Hakim al-Samarqandi has developed sixty-two credal statements, and states that the failure to observe them means that one cannot be regarded among the majority of Muslims (al-Sawad al-A'zam), an idea which he based on the Hadith containing al-Sawad al-A'zam (the great majority). (Note: Numerous narrations of this hadith are found in the collections of Abu Dawud, al-Tirmidhi, Ibn Majah, al-Hakim Nishapuri, Ahmad ibn Hanbal and others: they vary in being sahih, hasan, or da'if, but the hadith is established. Among those who have authenticated this hadith are al-Tirmidhi, al-Hakim, al-Shatibi, al-Dhahabi, Ibn Kathir, Ibn Hajar and al-'Iraqi. Most narrations mention the splitting-up of the Jews and the Christians into seventy-one or seventy-two sects, all being in the Fire except one, prior to mention of the Muslims dividing even more. In some of the narrations, Muhammad describes the Saved Sect variously as "the Jama'ah (community, congregation, main body)", "al-Sawad al-A'zam (the largest body)" and "that which follows what I and my Companions are upon." The hadith does not mean that the majority of Muslim will be in the Hellfire, for most of them ("the masses") are not involved in intentional, divisive innovation; further, mention of the Fire does not necessarily imply that the seventy-two sects will remain there forever, or that those sects are disbelievers.)

The text is a particularly important work in the development of Hanafi-Maturidi theology, as it attempts to faithfully represent the theological beliefs of Abu Hanifa two centuries after his death to a Persian/Central Asian audience then wrestling with the rise of Mu'tazili thought. The text was well-circulated in the centuries after its composition, both in the original Arabic and a Persian translation, along with a later Turkish translation during the Ottoman era.

Al-Sawad al-A'zam had been commissioned in the early part of the tenth century by Isma'il b. Ahmad (r. 279/892–295/907), the real founder of the Samanid polity in Transoxiana and Khurasan, in order to define the parameters of the Sunni 'orthodoxy' the Samanids were committed to upholding. Blunt in style and authoritarian in tone, al-Sawad al-A'zam was in effect a Hanafite catechism consisting of responses to a large number of doctrinal questions. Like Tafsir al-Tabari, it was translated anonymously, indicating that its contents were not tied to any individual authorial view but rather represented the collective position of the Hanafite theologians of Transoxiana.

According to the introduction, the purpose of al-Sawad al-A'zam was to counter the growth of sectarianism in the Samanid realm by setting out clearly the consensus of the theologians of Central Asia regarding specific points of Hanafite doctrine. In the process of doing so, it condemned the beliefs of groups it deemed heretical. These included not just the usual Isma'ilis – but also Mu'tazilites, Kharijites, Murji'ites, Jabarites, Qadarites, and Karramites.

== Influence and Popularity ==
Kitab al-Sawad al-A'zam (The Book of the Great Masses) enshrined Hanafism in Transoxiana during the reign of the influential Samanids. As a result of the acceptance and influence of this statement of belief, the Turkic tribes north of Transoxiana were converted to Hanafism, including the Oghuz Turks, who would eventually become the Seljuk rulers of Iran, Iraq, Syria, and Anatolia during the 11th to 13th centuries.

== See also ==
- Al-Aqidah al-Tahawiyyah
- Tabsirat al-Adilla
- List of Sunni books
