= Ali al-Balkhi =

11th century scholar and statesman of the Seljuk Empire

ʿAlī ibn Abī Ṭālib al-Balkhī
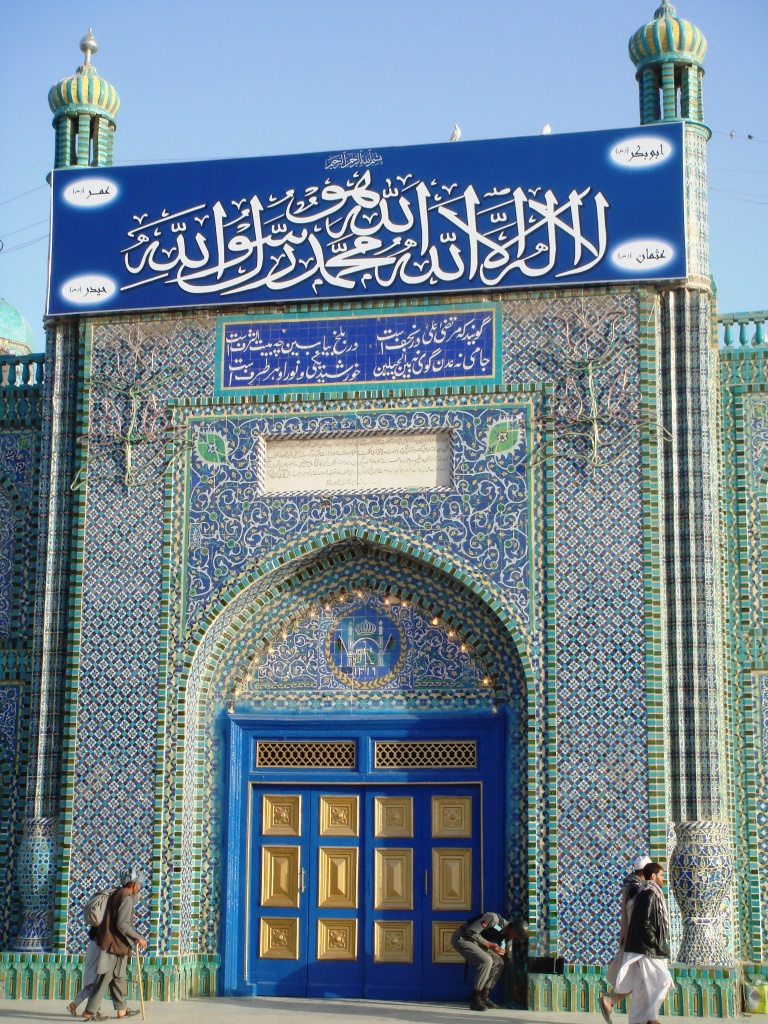
- The Blue Mosque of Mazar-i-Sharif was built over an earlier mosque which was a memorial to Ali al-Balkhi.
- Title: Abū al-Ḥasan

Personal life
- Born: Balkh, Seljuk Empire
- Died: 1092 CE
- Era: Islamic Golden Age

Religious life
- Religion: Islam
- Denomination: Sunni (Ḥanafī)

Abū al-Ḥasan ʿAlī ibn Abī Ṭālib al-Balkhī (Arabic: أبو الحسن علي بن أبي طالب البلخي; died 1092) was a Khorasani Arab Muslim scholar and jurist, belonging to the Hanafi school of thought. He was a nobleman under the Seljuk Empire while maintaining his identity as a devout Sufi ascetic. Al-Balkhi was a Sayyid who claimed descent from Husayn ibn Ali, grandson of the Islamic prophet Muhammad.

== Biography ==
According to the genealogist Ibn 'Inaba, the father of Abu al-Hasan Ali ibn Abi Talib al-Balkhi was a descendant of Husayn ibn Ali, while his mother was a descendant of Muhammad ibn al-Hanafiyyah. Both Husayn and Ibn Hanafiyyah were sons of the fourth Rashidun caliph Ali, hence Al-Balkhi is only a descendant of the Islamic prophet Muhammad on his father's side while he is a descendant of Ali on both father and mother's side. His uncle, Muhammad ibn 'Ubayd Allah, was the head of the al-ʿAlawiyyīn (direct descendants of Ali) in Seljuk-ruled Khorasan.

Al-Balkhi was a scholar and jurist with a nobleman status amongst the Seljuk court. Despite his nobility, he attempted to maintain a status as a devout Sufi ascetic. He was also a religious teacher who became remarkable for his recitation of the Qur'an. A mosque was constructed as a memorial to him, which became erroneously attributed to the actual Rashidun caliph Ali and was eventually replaced by the larger Blue Mosque.

== See also ==
- List of Hanafis
- List of Maturidis
