= Khoja Kurban Madrasah (Qarshi) =

Madrasa in Qashqadaryo, Uzbekistan

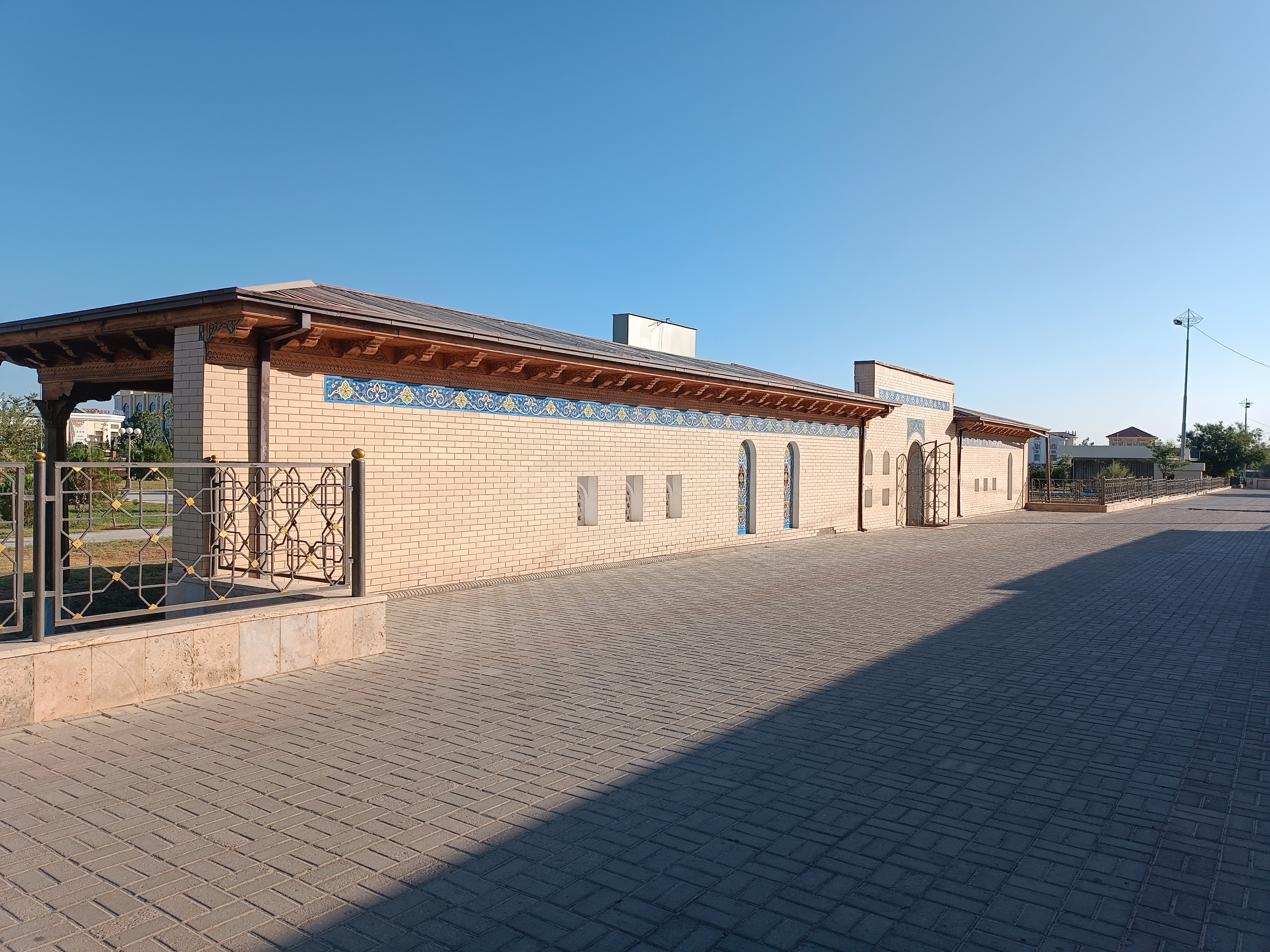

General information
- Architectural style: Central Asian Architecture
- Location: Darvozatutak neighborhood, Qarshi city, Qashqadaryo Region, Uzbekistan
- Owner: State Property

Technical details
- Material: baked brick
- Floor area: 21.25 × 21 m

Khoja Kurban Madrasah is an architectural monument (built in late 19th – early 20th century) located in Darvozatutak neighborhood, Qarshi city, Qashqadaryo Region. The architectural monument was included in the national list of real estate objects of the material and cultural heritage of Uzbekistan in accordance with the decision of the President of the Republic of Uzbekistan dated December 19, 2018.

== History ==
Khoja Kurban madrasah is one floor, the front part faces east, and the west side is connected with residential houses. The authorities used it as a prison in 1925. Even in 1954 its state of preservation was much better. By this time, it was handed over to the city's household services. L. Mankovskaya also gave brief information about the condition of Khoja Kurban madrasa in the 1970s. Even at that time, it was included in the list of well-preserved historical monuments. Only the entrance of madrasah has been completely preserved until now .

== Architecture ==
The base of the madrasa was 21.25 x 21 meters, the top of the cells was closed in the style of a balkhi dome. There was also a small courtyard (10.7 × 9.1 m) of Khoja Kurban madrasah. The madrasah was built of Russian bricks, with a murabba roof, and a pediment. The small courtyard is surrounded by cells; the rooms were square-shaped, sometimes with domes. From pediment, the courtyard can be entered through the miyonsaroy. The madrasah was bordered on one side by a murabba-style classroom (the walls of the classroom were extended by making shelves, the dome rested on shield-shaped beams), and the opposite side of the classroom was occupied by a pair of narrow rooms. The surface of the Khoja Kurban Madrasah was made smooth with polished bricks.

== Gallery ==
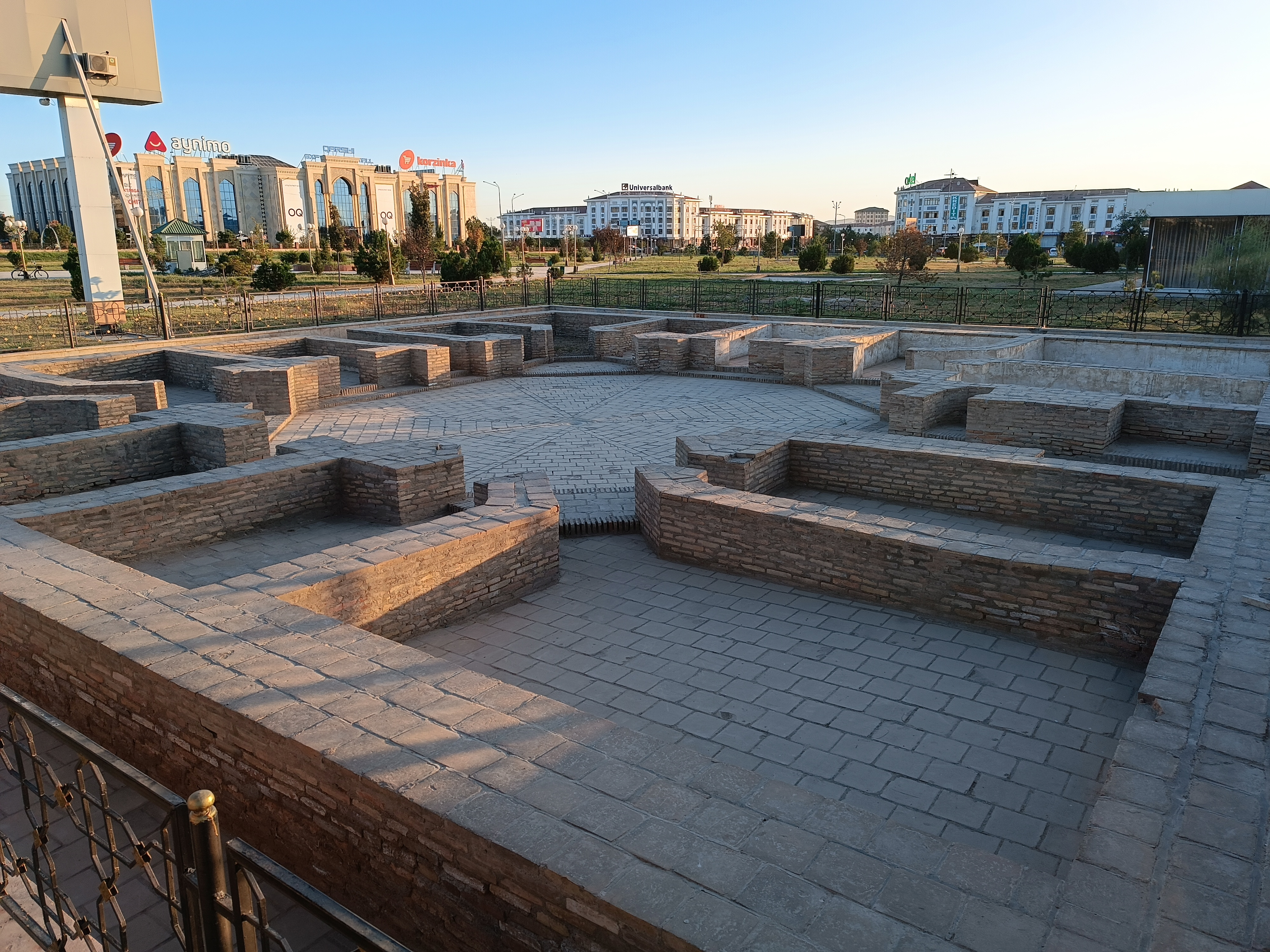
View of the preserved part of Khoja Kurban madrasa from the north-west side

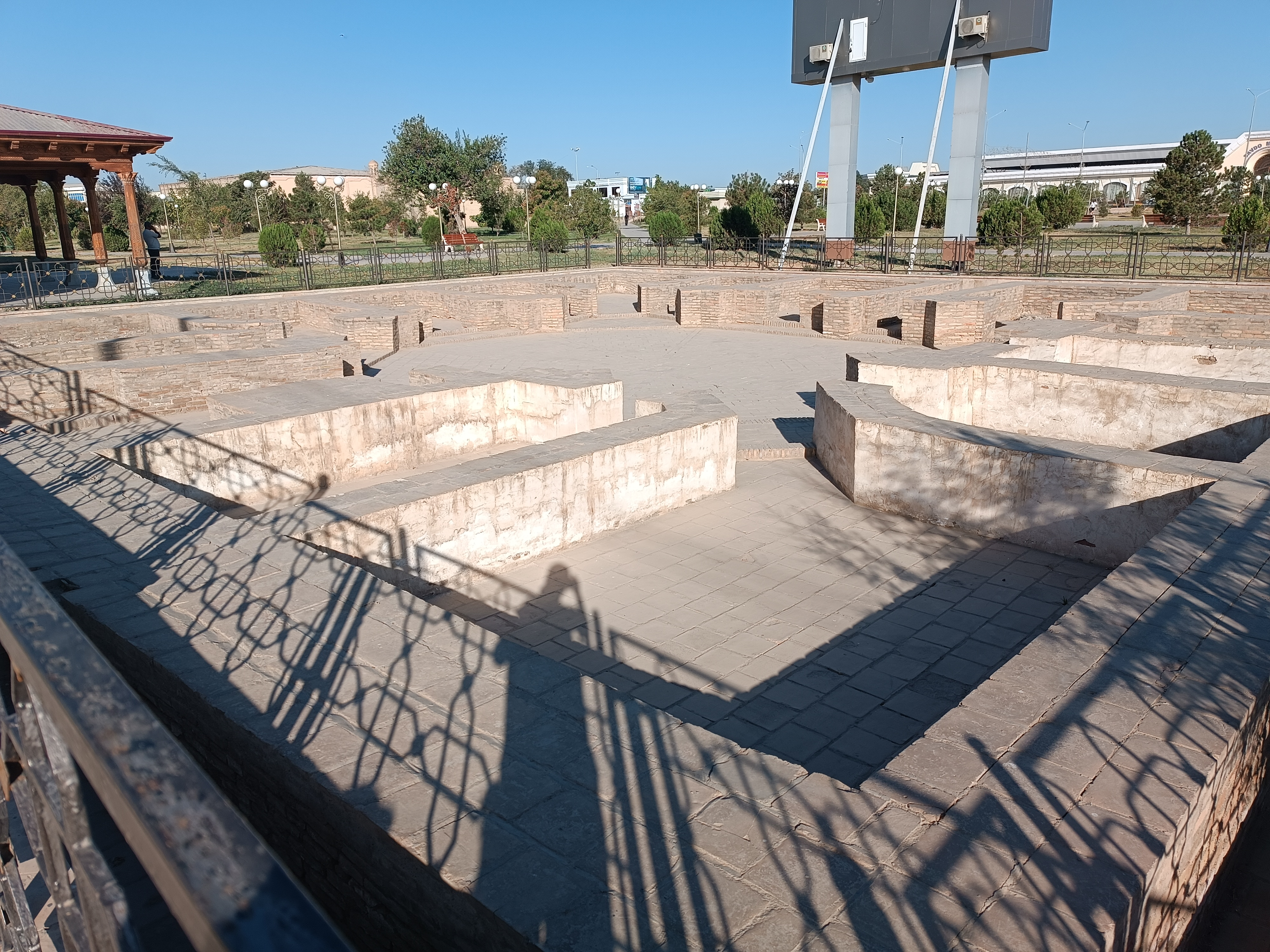
View of the preserved part of Khoja Kurban madrasa from the south-east side

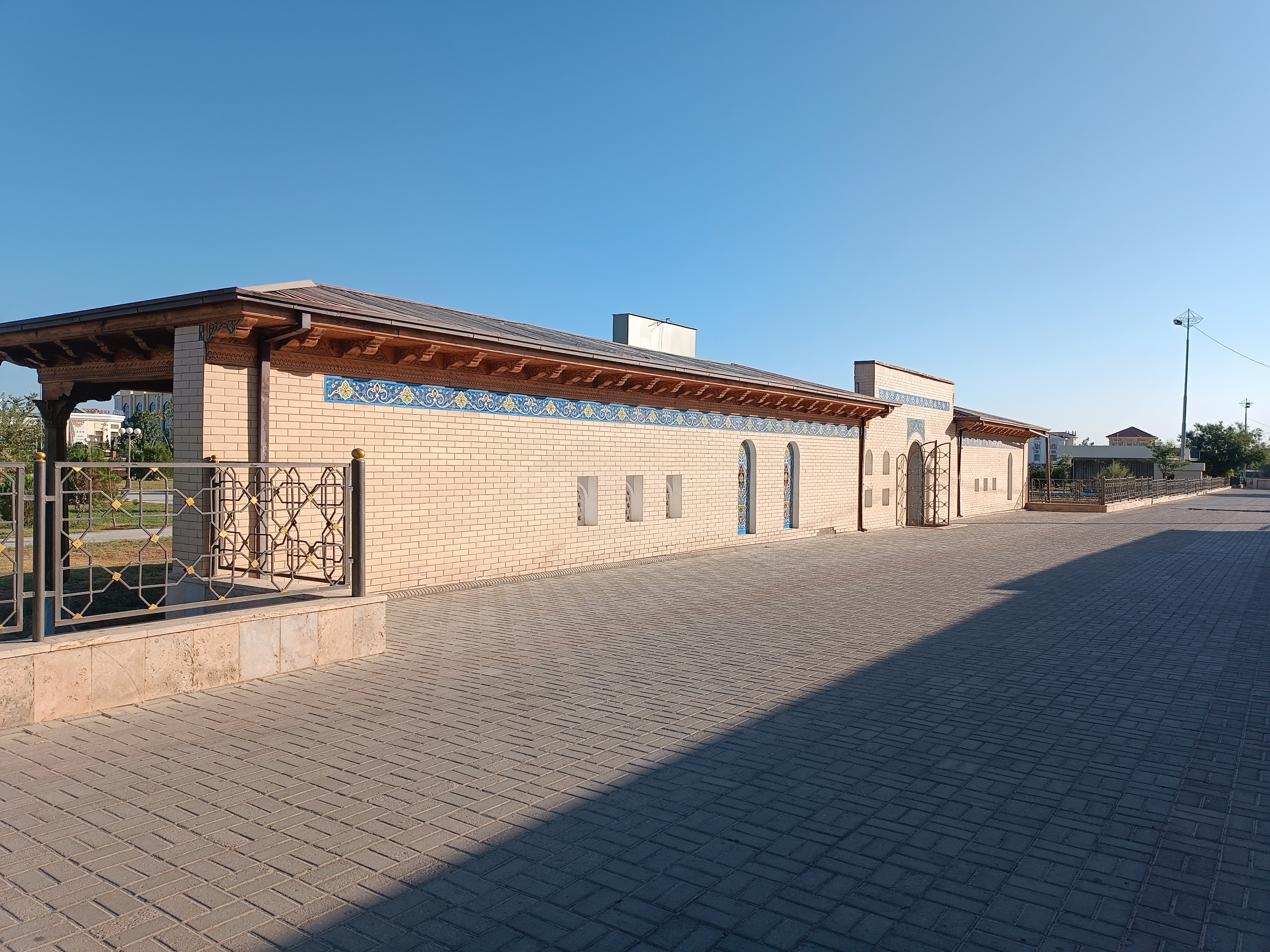
Entrance of Khoja Kurban Madrasah
