= Kitab al-Tawhid (Al-Maturidi) =

Book by Abu Mansur al-Maturidi

The Book of Monotheism
- Author: Abu Mansur al-Maturidi
- Original title: كتاب التوحيد
- Translator: Translated into English by Atabek Shukurov; Translated into Turkish by Bekir Topaloğlu and Muhammed Aruçi; Translated into Russian by Ramil Adigamov
- Language: Arabic
- Subject: Aqidah, Kalam (Islamic theology)
- Publication place: Transoxiana (present-day Uzbekistan)
- ISBN: 9781999377502
- One of the fundamental books of the Maturidiyya, the orthodox Sunnite school of theology.

Kitab al-Tawhid (Arabic: كتاب التوحيد, lit. 'The Book of Monotheism') is a Sunni theological book, and the primary source of the Maturidi school of thought; written by the Hanafi scholar Abu Mansur al-Maturidi (d. 333 AH/944 CE).

Kitab al-Tawhid is monumental work which expounded the tenets and beliefs of the Ahl al-Sunna wa al-Jama'a and countered the stands of opponents such as the Karramites, Mu'tazilites, Qadariyya, Majus, Sophists, Dualists, and Christians.

This work provides a detailed and holistic approach to Islamic theology, while also serving as its earliest extant comprehensive source. Al-Maturidi presents the epistemological foundations of his teaching and provides detailed arguments in defence of Monotheism, including his cosmological doctrines such as proofs for the creation and ontology of the Universe. He also focuses on God, his existence and attributes, analyzing issues related to anthropomorphism and rationalism among others.

== Editions ==
The book was edited by Bekir Topaloğlu and Muhammed Aruçi and published twice by İSAM Publications (2000 and 2003). The third impression was made in Beirut in 2007.

== Awards ==
The book received the 16th World Prize for the "Book of the Year" in the field of Islamic studies from the Ministry of Culture and Islamic Guidance of the Islamic Republic of Iran in 2008. The editors of the book, Bekir Topaloğlu and Muhammed Aruçi, were invited by the Ministry of Culture and Islamic Guidance to Iran on this occasion. On February 7, 2009, the "Book of the Year" prize in Muslim theology was granted to the winners by President Mahmud Ahmadinejad.

== Authenticity ==
Joseph Schacht, in his article announcing the discovery of the Kitab al-Tawhid, described the Cambridge manuscript as an authentic work by al-Maturidi. Since the one surviving manuscript was published by Fathallah Khalif in 1970, research based on it has been conducted by students of Islamic theology and several reviews and studies of it have been published.

== Table of Contents ==
- Arabic Transliteration Key,
- Introduction,
- A Short Biography of Imam Abu Mansur al-Maturidi,
- Chain of Teachers from Imam Abu Hanifa to Imam al-Maturidi,
- Kitab at-Tawhid,
- Notes on Translation,
- 1. Religion Must Not Be Based on Belief in Authority (Taqlid) but Must Be Based on Evidence,
- 2. Knowledge of the Religion Is Acquired Through Transmission (Sam’) & the Intellect (‘Aql),
- 3. Humans Have Essentially Three Means of Acquiring Knowledge:
- a). The Senses,
- b). Transmission,
- c). Intellect,
- 4. Proof for the Created Nature of the Universe;
- The Ontological Structure of the Universe,
- 5. Proof That the Universe Has a Creator,
- 6. The Issue of the Creator of the Universe Being One,
- 7. The Issue of the Creator of the Universe Being One Based on Reason,
- 8. Refutation of Those who Dispute our Teachings on Epistemology,
- 9. Deducing that Which is Present from that Which is Absent,
- 10. The Refutation of those Who Profess the Eternity of the Universe,
- 11. God's Names and Attributes: God may not be Described as Body (Jism),
- 12. God may be Described as a 'Thing' (Shay'),
- 13. Shaykh Abu Mansur was asked About the Meaning of 'The One,'
- 14. God's Essential Attributes: Free Will ('Ikhtiyar),
- 15. Power (Qudra) and Will (Irada),
- 16. Knowledge ('Ilm),
- 17. God's Attribute of Action: Creating (Taqwin),
- 18. Proof of the Existence of the Attributes: Against Equating the Creation with the Created,
- 19. Creating is just as Eternal as Knowledge and Power,
- 20. Presentation and Refutation of al-Ka'bi's Doctrine on the Attributes,
- 21. Speech (Kalam),
- 22. The Correct Understanding of God's Free Will ('Ikhtiyar) in Repudiation of Ka'bi,
- 23. Against those Who Profess an Autonomous Process of Nature,
- 24. Against those Who Profess an Eternal Material Substance (Tina),
- 25. Against The Karramites,
- 26. The Correct Understanding of God's Names (Asma'),
- 27. All Names Apply to God Eternally (with a Critique of Jahm bin Safwan),
- 28. Anthropomorphic Descriptions of God in the Qur'an;
- God's Istawa' on the Throne (Al-Istawa' 'ala al-'Arsh), (Note: According to Ash'aris and Maturidis, "Al-Istawa' 'ala al-'Arsh" should not be taken in the sense of "being seated on the throne". God's "Istawa' 'ala al-'Arsh" means neither sitting on the Throne nor any direction... because the Throne is contingent. And, it does not mean manner or mode or proximity because He is God in heavens as much as He is God on the earth. God is eternal and everlasting while the Throne is not. The eternal God cannot be assigned attributes or described in terms contingent on His creatures for He states in the Qur'an that, "There is nothing whatever like Him" (42:11; 112:4). This short statement emphasizes that God is not of the same kind as those who have been created and, therefore, He is beyond all human concepts of Him. So He has no mates and nothing is like Him, nor does He beget, nor is He begotten. Nothing – neither matter, nor space, nor time – can restrict or contain Him. And this is why His Attributes – His Hearing, Seeing, Knowledge, Will, Power, Creating, and so on – are also beyond anything we can conceive. Therefore attributing to God transmutation, movement, staying at a place, standing, sitting and other items of this nature, is not permitted. Such attributes mark contingency and God transcends such attributes. Likewise God's hands are not "two hands i.e., organs and do not have any form, shape or appearance...," the same applying to other Qur'anic anthropomorphic expressions, underscored by the clause, we do not know the how of them.)
- 29. The Differing Views of the Throne as well as the Possibility of a Localisation of God,
- 30. Summary of Al-Maturidi's Teachings,
- 31. Disputation with Ka'abi and Against the Idea that God is in the Sky Above Us,
- 32. The Meaning of the Terms 'Near' 'Coming' 'Going' and 'Sitting' in Regard to God,
- 33. The Vision of God (Ru'yat Allah) in Paradise,
- 34. Dispute with Muslim Opponents Against the Mu'tazilites;
- Proof that their Main Teachings are Close to the Ideas of Foreign Religions,
- 35. Against the Thesis; That which is Non-Existent (Ma'dum) Has Always Existed,
- 36. Against the Thesis; God has not Eternally been the Creator,
- 37. Against the Thesis; God's Art of Creation is not Different from that Which is Created,
- God's Will is not other than that Which is Willed,
- 38. Against the Thesis; Accidents Function in the Material Universe According to their Own Sets of Laws,
- 39. Against the Thesis; Humans, Based on their Freedom can Act in a Way that God did not know Previously,
- 40. Description of God and Attributing Names to Him does not Entail Anthropomorphism,
- 41. Why did God Create the Universe?
- 42. Dispute with Al-Najjar on God's Wisdom and Providence,
- 43. The Question of Why God Created the World (against Al-Najjar, the Mu'tazilites and Isma'ilis),
- 44. The Definition of Wisdom,
- 45. God's Command and Prohibition (in Agreement with Al-Najjar),
- 46. God's Promise and Threat (in Agreement with Al-Najjar),
- 47. On the Correct Understanding of the Maxim 'Whoever Knows Himself, Knows His Lord,'
- 48. Again; On the Use of the Terms: 'Thing' (Shay'), Body (Jism) and Being (Huwiyyah) with God,
- 49. Again; Is God in a Place (due to His Istawa' on The Throne)?
- 50. On the Application of the Categories; What (ma), How (kayfiyya), When (ayna), and Action (fil) in the Teaching on God's Attributes,
- 51. Theodicy; God's Wisdom and Providence in the Creation of Harmful Beings and Substances,
- 51. The Disagreement of Sects on the Nature of the Universe,
- 52. Refutation of Dualism,
- 53. Refutation of Naturalism,
- 54. Approaches to Monotheism,
- 55. The Views of Muhammad ibn Shabib on the Existence and Attributes of the Creator,
- 56. Defence of the Necessity of Speculative Reasoning (Nazar) in Theology,
- 57. Muhammad ibn Shabib's Argument for the Created Nature of Bodies,
- 58. Refutation of the Teachings of the Dahriyya,
- 59. The Categories of Aristotle,
- 60. Refutation of the Sumaniya's Thesis that the World is with no Beginning and Incessantly Sinks Downward; Al-Nazzam's Argument with a Commentary by Imam al-Maturidi,
- 61. Against the Sophists; Muhammad ibn Shabib's Argument with a Commentary by Imam al-Maturidi,
- 62. On the Teachings of the Manicheans; An Exposition of their Incorrectness,
- 63. On the Teachings of the Daysaniyyah (followers of Bardesanes, i.e., Ibn Daysan); An Exposition of their Incorrectness,
- 64. On the Teachings of the Marcionites; An Exposition of their Incorrectness,
- 65. On the Teachings of the Magians; An Exposition of their Incorrectness.
- Acknowledgements,
- Glossary.

== See also ==
- Al-Fiqh al-Akbar
- Al-'Aqida al-Tahawiyya
- Tabsirat al-Adilla
- Al-Sawad al-A'zam
- Salafi–Sufi relations
- Sharh al-'Aqa'id al-Nasafiyya
- List of Sunni books
- 2016 international conference on Sunni Islam in Grozny
