= Syed Muzaffar Shah Qadri =

Islamic scholar from Pakistan

Allama Syed Muzaffar Shah Qadri

Personal life
- Born: 10 April 1968 (age 58) Karachi, Pakistan
- Parent: Nobat Ali Shah Qadri (father)
- Main interest: Sufism

Religious life
- Religion: Islam
- Denomination: Sunni
- Jurisprudence: Hanafi
- Tariqa: Qadiriyya
- Creed: Maturidi
- Movement: Barelvi
- Website: www.truecolorsofislam.com

Allama Syed Muzaffar Shah Qadri (born 10 April 1968), is a Pakistani Islamic scholar belonging to the Barelvi movement of Sunni Islam. He is the son of Nobat Ali Shah Qadri, a sufi saint. He is a Friday preacher at the Jama Masjid Habibiya. He is the Founder and Chairman of the Jazba Welfare, a non-governmental organisation.

== Barelvi movement ==
Shah supports the Barelvi movement and raises various issues with Barelvi scholars. He claims that the movement is actually a name given to the Sunni majority on the Indian subcontinent, who adhere to the teachings of Ahmed Raza Khan. He delivers video and audio speeches.

== Protest against SIC leader Mehboob's death ==
Muzaffar Shah Qadri and other Sunni leaders asked the Government of Pakistan to investigate Mehboob's death in Pakistan Rangers’ custody.

== Controversies ==
Qadri was banned for preaching Islam in United Kingdom in 2016. He praised Mumtaz Qadri at the Falkirk Central Mosque in Britain, this influenced Tanveer Ahmad, who stabbed Asad Shah, a Ahmadiyya Muslim after he greeted Easter to Christians. Previously Qadri was banned to speak in public by Pakistan Government by branded as Firebrand. Member of Parliament Siobhain McDonagh said that a preacher banned in Karachi is coming and speaking publicly in our country is so shocking.
