= Abu Bakr al-Warraq =

Persian gnostic and Sufi sheikh

Muhammad ibn Umar al-Hakim al-Tirmidhi al-Balkhi, best known as Abu Bakr al-Warraq (died 893), was a noted 9th-century Persian gnostic (ʿārif) and Sufi sheikh. Born in Tirmidh (present-day Termez, Uzbekistan), he lived and worked in Balkh (present-day Afghanistan). His nephew was Abu Isa Muhammad ibn Isa al-Tirmidhi (died 892).
