= Tabsirat al-Adilla =

Book by Abu al-Mu'in al-Nasafi

- Author: Abu al-Mu'in al-Nasafi
- Original title: تبصرة الأدلة في أصول الدين
- Translator: Edited by Claude Salame with a preface in French.
- Language: Arabic
- Subject: Aqidah, Kalam (Islamic theology)
- Publisher: Institut Francais De Damas
- Publication date: 1990
- Publication place: Nasaf, Uzbekistan
- ISBN: 9782351591321
- One of an important classical work of Maturidi creed.

Tabsirat al-Adilla fi Usul al-Din: 'ala Tariqat al-Imam Abi Mansur al-Maturidi (Arabic: تبصرة الأدلة في أصول الدين على طريقة الإمام أبي منصور الماتريدي, lit. 'Exposition of the Proofs in the Basic Principles of Religion on the Basis of the Arguments of Imam Abu Mansur al-Maturidi's Teachings'), better known as Tabsirat al-Adilla (transl. Instruction on Cogent Proofs), is considered as the second most important kalam book of the Maturidi school, after Kitab al-Tawhid of al-Maturidi himself, composed by Abu al-Mu'in al-Nasafi.

Al-Nasafi's presentation of the issues in this work is more systematic and his style is more accessible than that of al-Maturidi. The book is even more appreciated by the experts than “Kitab at-Tawhid” that it gives more perfect and detailed information about the main principles of the science of kalam. It is probably because of this style that Nur al-Din al-Sabuni (d. 580 A.H. / 1184 A.D.), a later representative of Maturidite school, states that al-Nasafi's work was his main source. And perhaps because of this fact that Abu al-Mu'in al-Nasafi was appreciated among the specialists in this field with the honourable title “Sahib at-Tabsira” (The Author of Tabsira) and became famous among the scholars.

The connection between al-Nasafi and al-Maturidi in the Tabsirat al-Adilla is clear and needs no further proof. Because al-Nasafi admires al-Maturidi, he refers to his ideas several times, and he always supports his views against Mu'tazili and Ash'ari thinking. In addition, he gives a list of the scholars of the Hanafi-Maturidi school in Transoxania and their works, which is not available in any other source. Al-Nasafi throughout Tabsirat al-Adilla refers to the views of al-Maturidi mostly as "qala al-Shaikh al-Imam Abu Mansur al-Maturidi", without naming his work.

In his explanations, al-Nasafi follows closely the views of al-Maturidi and sometimes gives direct quotations from him. He also gives the views of his opponents in a fairly objective way. In discussing the issues, al-Nasafi develops a semantic analysis, a method not used or really developed by his followers.

== Summary ==
In the second half of the 11th and the beginning of the 12th centuries when Abu al-Mu'in al-Nasafi lived, the science of kalam reached its peak of development. Therefore, along with the teachings of Imam Abu Mansur al-Maturidi and Imam Abu al-Hasan al-Ash'ari, the works of other authors, their ideas and different views were thoroughly commented on which consequently found their scientific appreciation. Along with the main principles of the science of kalam, the book contains materials dealing with the debates and discussions with th opponents of the school and the refusals given by the author to the claims of the rivals in the science. The book also contains critical analyses and interpretations of the ideas promoted by different parties who tried to oppose the principles declared by the Maturidi school as well as the author of the book.

A large part of this work discusses the ideas of the Mu'tazili school of Islamic thought. Exposition of the Sunni creed, with refutation of heretical doctrines.

== Content ==
The Tabsirat al-Adilla begins with the theory of knowledge. Then al-Nasafi discusses the problem of the creation of the world and goes on to establish the existence of its Creator. The absolute oneness of God and the rejection of opposing views is the next topic. This is followed by the discussion of God's attributes, in particular his speech (kalam) and creative power (takwin). Al-Nasafi goes on to discuss prophecy, the relation of God and humanity, human freedom and responsibility, predetermination, and definition of belief (iman) and finishes with a discussion of rulership.

== Editions and Manuscripts ==
The book is so thick that it consists of two volumes containing more than one thousand pages. The first volume was published in Damascus, the capital city of Syria, in 1990 and the second volume in 1993 by the French Centre of Studying the Arabic Language. Dealing with this matter it is noteworthy to mention the kind service provided by a researcher Claude Salama, who, in fact, performed a huge amount of work by comparing the four manuscripts of the book he had at his disposal and showing their merits and flaws.

The first manuscript consists of 209 pages and it is preserved in the scientific library of Alexandria in Egypt under the code of 779 B. Written in the style of naskh script, “At-Tabsira” was copied by Muhammad ibn Hasan ibn al-Husain in 659/1269 in Bukhara. This version, as is written in its preface, is considered to be the oldest copy of the book.

The second manuscript is also written in naskh script with big letters and contains 490 pages. It is preserved in “Dar al-Kutub al-Misriyya” library in Cairo. However, the year of copying and the name of the scribe is not mentioned in the manuscript. Perhaps the second manuscript was copied from the first one as both of the manuscripts contain the same merits and flaws.

The third manuscript which was used for publication is preserved in al-Azhar University library in Cairo under the code of 1106 (301). It consists of 383 pages and its last page contains a short message written in naskh script that it was copied in 1129/ 1717. The first page of the manuscript says that this book was presented by the owner Ibrahim Chelebi al-Barudi to the students of al-Azhar University by his will.

The researcher used one more manuscript that is preserved in the library “Dar al-Kutub al-Misriyya” under the number “10 m Tawhid”. It was copied by a scribe Abdu-l-Fattah Jad al-Mavla Abu-l-Fath ad-Daliji in naskh script in 1136/1724 and consists of 395 pages. The last page contains the following short message: “This copy was compared with its original version and some corrections were made by the scribe”.

== Authenticity ==
Nur al-Din al-Sabuni in his discussion with Fakhr al-Din al-Razi said that he had not seen any other book more accurate than the Tabsirat al-Adilla. The book has also not been as well known in the history of kalam as it should have been.

The Hanafi scholar Najm al-Din 'Umar al-Nasafi (d. 537/1142-3) who wrote an abridgement of the creed of Islam known as al-'Aqa'id al-Nasafiyyah, closely followed Abu al-Mu'in al-Nasafi's formulations in his Tabsirat al-Adilla.

== See also ==
- Al-Aqaid al-Nasafiyya
- Talkhis al-Adilla
- Al-Sawad al-A'zam
- Al-'Aqida al-Tahawiyya
- List of Sunni books
