= Nur al-Din al-Sabuni =

12th century Maturidite Sunni theologian

Nur al-Din al-Sabuni نور الدين الصابوني
- Title: Nur al-Din (Light of the Religion)

Personal life
- Born: Bukhara
- Died: 580 A.H. = 1184 A.D. Bukhara
- Era: Islamic Golden Age
- Region: Uzbekistan
- Main interest(s): Aqidah, Kalam (Islamic theology), Fiqh (Islamic jurisprudence)
- Notable work: Al-Bidayah min al-Kifayah fi al-Hidayah fi Usul al-Din

Religious life
- Religion: Islam
- Denomination: Sunni
- Jurisprudence: Hanafi
- Creed: Maturidi

Muslim leader
- Influenced by: Abu Hanifa Abu Mansur al-Maturidi Abu al-Mu'in al-Nasafi
- Influenced: Shams al-Aimma Muhammad al-Kardari

Nur al-Din al-Sabuni also written as Nuraddin as-Sabuni (Arabic: نور الدين الصابوني), was a 12th century theologian within the Maturidite school of Sunni Islam, and author of Al-Bidayah min al-Kifayah fi al-Hidayah fi Usul al-Din (Arabic: البداية من الكفاية في الهداية في أصول الدين), a summary of Islamic creed (aqida or kalam) of his more comprehensive work al-Kifayah.

== Name ==
Ahmad b. Mahmud b. Abi Bakr al-Sabuni al-Bukhari, known as Nur al-Din Abu Muhammad.

== Birth and Death ==
He was born in Bukhara probably at the beginning of sixth / twelfth century, and died in the same city on 16 Safar 580 / May 30, 1184, and was buried in the Graveyard of the Seven Judges (Arabic: مقبرة القضاة السبعة).

== Life ==
There is not much information about his life. He seems to have belonged to a respected family in Bukhara, where he spent much of his life. He received his education in the same city and became a leading defender of the Maturidite theology of his time. He had made a trip to Mecca to perform hajj and on his way to Mecca, he visited Khurasan and Iraq and had discussions with the scholars of these regions.

He also had lively discussions with Fakhr al-Din al-Razi, a leading representative of Ash'arite theology of his time. According to al-Razi's report, at the end of these discussions, Sabuni said that all his knowledge of kalam was based on the work of Abu al-Mu'in al-Nasafi; he also admitted to his own weakness in the science but said he was too old to start again.

== Books ==
Al-Sabuni wrote a number of works, some of which are still in manuscript. In his al-Muntaqa min 'ismat al-Anbiya' (Arabic: المنتقى من عصمة الأنبياء, lit. 'Selection from the Infallibility of the Prophets'), he summarizes the work of Muhammad b. Yahya al-Bashaghiri (Arabic: محمد بن يحيى البشاغري) called Kashf al-Ghawamid fi Ahwal al-Anbiya' (Arabic: كشف الغوامض في أحوال الأنبياء) or 'Ismat al-Anbiya' (Arabic: عصمة الأنبياء, lit. 'Impeccability of the Prophets'). It starts by saying God sending a prophet is the result of His wise purpose, that prophets must be human, and that some of them are superior to others. Then after discussing their number and their infallibility, he goes on to discuss each individual prophet, starting with Adam and ending with the last prophet Muhammad.

His al-Kifaya fi al-Hidaya (Arabic: الكفاية في الهداية, lit. 'Sufficient in Guidance') is a longer version of his al-Bidaya fi Usul al-Din (Arabic: البداية في أصول الدين, lit. 'Introduction to the Principles of Religion'). As he states in the introduction of the latter work, some of his friends found al-Kifaya too long and asked him to summarize it, and consequently he wrote al-Bidaya. Through these works, al-Sabuni closely follows and defends the views of al-Maturidi. Al-Bidaya begins with a discussion of the sources of knowledge. Then, al-Sabuni tries to establish first the createdness (huduth) of the world, then the existence of its Creator. This is followed by a discussion of God's attributes. Al-Sabuni also deals with the issues that are controversial between the Ash'arites and the Maturidites, such as the attribute of creating (takwin) and supports the position of al-Maturidi. The discussions of prophecy, degree, predetermination and human actions are followed by other traditional theoretical issues.

== See also ==
- Abu Hanifa
- Abu Mansur al-Maturidi
- Abu al-Yusr al-Bazdawi
- Abu al-Mu'in al-Nasafi
- List of Ash'aris and Maturidis
- List of Muslim theologians
