= Abu al-Mu'in al-Nasafi =

Central Asian Hanafi theologian (1027–1115)

Abu al-Mu'in al-Nasafi أبو المعين النسفي
- Title: His Bahr al-Kalam has had considerable popularity, and on the title-page of the printed edition he is called: "Chief of the People of al-Sunna and al-Jama'a, Sword of the truth and of religion".

Personal life
- Born: 418 A.H. = 1027 A.D. or 438 A.H. = 1046 A.D. Nasaf
- Died: 508 A.H. = 1114-5 A.D. Nasaf
- Era: Islamic Golden Age
- Region: Uzbekistan
- Main interest(s): Aqidah, Kalam (Islamic theology), Fiqh (Islamic jurisprudence), Semantics
- Notable work(s): Tabsirat al-Adillah, Bahr al-Kalam

Religious life
- Religion: Islam
- Denomination: Sunni
- Jurisprudence: Hanafi
- Creed: Maturidi

Muslim leader
- Influenced by: Abu Hanifa Abu Mansur al-Maturidi Al-Hakim al-Samarqandi
- Influenced: Najm al-Din 'Umar al-Nasafi 'Ala' al-Din al-Kasani Abu al-Thana' al-Lamishi Sa'd al-Din al-Taftazani Nur al-Din al-Sabuni

Abu al-Mu'in al-Nasafi (Uzbek: Абул-Муин ан-Насафи; Arabic: أبو المعين النسفي; c.1027 – c.1115 A.D.) was a Central Asian Hanafi scholar who is considered to be the most important theologian in the Maturidi school of Sunni Islam after Imam Abu Mansur al-Maturidi, provided a fairly detailed account of al-Maturidi Central Asian predecessors.

== Name ==
His name was Abu al-Ma'in Maymun b. Muhammad b. Muhammad b. Mu'tamad b. Muhammad Ibn Mak-hul b. al-Fadhl al-Nasafi al-Mak-huli.

== Birth ==
He was born in Nasaf (present Karshi) around 438 A.H. (1046 A.D.) and died in the same city in 508 A.H. (1115 A.D.). It was said that his birth was in 418 A.H. (1027 A.D.) according to Khair al-Din al-Zarkali and Umar Rizo Kahhol, while Qutluwbugha says it was in 438 A.H. (1046 A.D.), based on the age of his death being seventy years in the year of 508 A.H. (1115 A.D.).

== Life ==
Classical sources give no information about his life, but he lived in an age in which Muslim theology was reaching its peak, and he contributed to this development.

He was born in an educated family. His ancestors were respected by society as great scholars of "fiqh" science. His great-grandfather, Makhul Nasafi, was a disciple of Imam al-Maturidi, and his grandfather, Mu’tamid ibn Makhul Nasafi, was famous as a theologian, Hanafi jurist (Faqih), and mystic (Sufi) who was reported to have written a number of works. He received his primary education from his father and grandfather.

== Kalam ==
Abu al-Mu'in al-Nasafi was one of the prominent representatives of "kalam", the science of aqeedah, and played an important role in the wide dissemination of the teachings of Maturidiyya, founded by Abu Mansur al-Maturidi.

== Students ==
Some of his popular students are:

- Najm al-Din 'Umar al-Nasafi (d. 537/1142), the author of al-'Aqa'id al-Nasafiyyah (Arabic: العقائد النسفية).
- 'Ala' al-Din Samarqandi (d. 539/1144), the author of Tuhfat al-Fuqaha' (Arabic: تحفة الفقهاء).
- 'Ala' al-Din al-Kasani (d. 578/1191), the author of Bada'i' al-Sana'i' (Arabic: بدائع الصنائع).
- Sadr al-A'imma Abu al-Ma'ali Ahmad b. Muhammad b. Muhammad b. al-Husain al-Bazdawi (d. 542/1147).

Sometimes it's assumed that Abu al-Thana' al-Lamishi was a student of him, though this is not known for sure.

== Books ==
He wrote many works aimed at clarifying misconceptions about Islam, fighting religious fanaticism. Some of his popular and widely accepted works are as follows:

- Tabsirat al-Adillah (Instructing the Evidences); is considered as the second major work in the Maturidi curriculum, after Imam al-Maturidi's Kitab al-Tawhid.
- Al-Tamhid li-Qawa'id al-Tawhid (Introduction to the Principles of Monotheism); is a summary of Tabsirat al-Adilla (Instructing the Evidences).
- Bahr al-Kalam fi 'Ilm al-Tawhid (Ocean of Discussions on the Science of Monotheism); is one of the main sources of "kalam" science in Maturidism.

== Death ==
It is widely accepted that he died in 508 A.H. (1114 or 1115 A.D.).

His mausoleum, located in the village of Kovchin in Karshi district, is one of the ancient pilgrimage places.

President Shavkat Mirziyoyev, during his visit to Kashkadarya region on 24–25 February 2017, gave recommendations on improvement of his mausoleum, creation of necessary conditions for visitors, organization of a library and translation of his works.

== See also ==
- Abu al-Mu'in al-Nasafi Memorial Complex
- Abu Hanifa
- Al-Hakim al-Samarqandi
- Abu al-Yusr al-Bazdawi
- Abu Ishaq al-Saffar al-Bukhari
- Nur al-Din al-Sabuni
- List of Hanafis
- List of Ash'aris and Maturidis
- List of Muslim theologians

Early Islamic scholars

Muhammad, The final Messenger of God (570–632) the Constitution of Medina, taught the Quran, and advised his companions
Abdullah ibn Masud (died 653) taught	Ali (607–661) fourth caliph taught	Aisha, Muhammad's wife and Abu Bakr's daughter taught	Abd Allah ibn Abbas (618–687) taught	Zayd ibn Thabit (610–660) taught	Umar (579–644) second caliph taught	Abu Hurairah (603–681) taught
Alqama ibn Qays (died 681) taught	Husayn ibn Ali (626–680) taught	Qasim ibn Muhammad ibn Abi Bakr (657–725) taught and raised by Aisha	Urwah ibn Zubayr (died 713) taught by Aisha, he then taught	Said ibn al-Musayyib (637–715) taught	Abdullah ibn Umar (614–693) taught	Abd Allah ibn al-Zubayr (624–692) taught by Aisha, he then taught
Ibrahim al-Nakha’i taught	Ali ibn Husayn Zayn al-Abidin (659–712) taught	Hisham ibn Urwah (667–772) taught	Ibn Shihab al-Zuhri (died 741) taught	Salim ibn Abd-Allah ibn Umar taught	Umar ibn Abdul Aziz (682–720) raised and taught by Abdullah ibn Umar
Hammad ibn Abi Sulayman taught	Muhammad al-Baqir (676–733) taught	Farwah bint al-Qasim Jafar's mother
Abu Hanifa (699–767) wrote Al Fiqh Al Akbar and Kitab Al-Athar, jurisprudence followed by Sunni, Sunni Sufi, Barelvi, Deobandi, Zaidiyyah and originally by the Fatimid and taught	Zayd ibn Ali (695–740)	Ja'far bin Muhammad Al-Baqir (702–765) Muhammad and Ali's great great grand son, jurisprudence followed by Shia, he taught	Malik ibn Anas (711–795) wrote Muwatta, jurisprudence from early Medina period now mostly followed by Maliki Sunnis in North Africa, and taught	Al-Waqidi (748–822) wrote history books like Kitab al-Tarikh wa al-Maghazi, student of Malik ibn Anas	Abu Muhammad Abdullah ibn Abdul Hakam (died 829) wrote biographies and history books, student of Malik ibn Anas
Abu Yusuf (729–798) wrote Usul al-fiqh	Muhammad al-Shaybani (749–805)	al-Shafi‘i (767–820) wrote Al-Risala, jurisprudence followed by Shafi'i Sunnis and Sufis, and taught	Ismail ibn Ibrahim	Ali ibn al-Madini (778–849) wrote The Book of Knowledge of the Companions	Ibn Hisham (died 833) wrote early history and As-Sirah an-Nabawiyyah, Muhammad's biography
Isma'il ibn Ja'far (719–775)	Musa al-Kadhim (745–799)	Ahmad ibn Hanbal (780–855) wrote Musnad Ahmad ibn Hanbal jurisprudence followed by Hanbali Sunnis and Sufis	Muhammad al-Bukhari (810–870) wrote Sahih al-Bukhari hadith books	Muslim ibn al-Hajjaj (815–875) wrote Sahih Muslim hadith books	Dawud al-Zahiri (815–883/4) founded the Zahiri school	Muhammad ibn Isa at-Tirmidhi (824–892) wrote Jami` at-Tirmidhi hadith books	Al-Baladhuri (died 892) wrote early history Futuh al-Buldan, Genealogies of the Nobles
Ibn Majah (824–887) wrote Sunan ibn Majah hadith book	Abu Dawood (817–889) wrote Sunan Abu Dawood Hadith Book
Muhammad ibn Ya'qub al-Kulayni (864- 941) wrote Kitab al-Kafi hadith book followed by Twelver Shia	Muhammad ibn Jarir al-Tabari (838–923) wrote History of the Prophets and Kings, Tafsir al-Tabari	Abu al-Hasan al-Ash'ari (874–936) wrote Maqālāt al-islāmīyīn, Kitāb al-luma, Kitāb al-ibāna 'an usūl al-diyāna
Ibn Babawayh (923–991) wrote Man La Yahduruhu al-Faqih jurisprudence followed by Twelver Shia	Sharif Razi (930–977) wrote Nahj al-Balagha followed by Twelver Shia	Nasir al-Din al-Tusi (1201–1274) wrote jurisprudence books followed by Ismaili and Twelver Shia	Al-Ghazali (1058–1111) wrote The Niche for Lights, The Incoherence of the Philosophers, The Alchemy of Happiness on Sufism	Rumi (1207–1273) wrote Masnavi, Diwan-e Shams-e Tabrizi on Sufism
Key: Some of Muhammad's Companions	Key: Taught in Medina	Key: Taught in Iraq	Key: Worked in Syria	Key: Travelled extensively collecting the sayings of Muhammad and compiled books of hadith	Key: Worked in Persia
