= Shams al-Din al-Samarqandi =

Medieval Islamic astronomer and mathematician

Al-Samarqandi
- شمس الدين سمرقندی

Personal life
- Born: c. 1250 Samarkand
- Died: c. 1310 Samarkand
- Era: Islamic Golden Age
- Main interest(s): Mathematics, astronomy

Religious life
- Religion: Islam
- Denomination: Sunni
- Jurisprudence: Hanafi
- Creed: Maturidi

Shams al-Dīn Muḥammad ibn Ashraf al-Ḥusaynī al-Samarqandī (Persian: شمس الدین سمرقندی; c. 1250 – c. 1310) was a 13th century Islamic theologian, astronomer and mathematician from Samarkand, now in Uzbekistan.

== Life ==
Little is known of al-Samarqandi's life, who composed his most important works during the 13th and 14th centuries. He wrote works on theology, logic, philosophy, mathematics and astronomy which are important in their own right, but also provide information about the works of other astronomers. His treatise, Risala fi adab al-bahth, is a discussion of dialectic reasoning as used by the ancient Greeks. He wrote Synopsis of Astronomy, and produced a star catalogue for the year 1276–1277.

Al-Samarqandi wrote a 20-page work which discussed 35 of Euclid's propositions. In his preparation of the work, al-Samarqandi consulted the works of other Muslim mathematicians such as Ibn al-Haytham, Omar Khayyam, Al-Abbās ibn Said al-Jawharī, Nasir al-Din al-Tusi, and Athīr al-Dīn al-Abharī.

== Sources ==
- Dilgan, Hamid (1970). "Al-Samarqandī, Shams al-Dīn Muḥammad ibn Ashraf al-Ḥusaynī". In Gillispie, Charles Coulston; Holmes, Frederic Lawrence (eds.). Dictionary of Scientific Biography. Vol. 12. New York: Scribner. OCLC 755137603.
- Fazlıoğlu, İhsan (2007). "Samarqandī: Shams al-Dīn Muḥammad ibn Ashraf al-Ḥusaynī al-Samarqandī". In Thomas Hockey; et al. (eds.). The Biographical Encyclopedia of Astronomers. New York: Springer. p. 1008. ISBN 978-0-387-31022-0. (PDF version)
- O'Connor, J.J.; Robertson, E.F. (1999). "Shams al-Din ibn Ashraf Al-Samarqandi". MacTutor. University of St Andrews.
