= List of Muslim theologians =

This is a list of notable Muslim theologians.

== Traditional theologians and philosophers ==
=== Ash'aris and Maturidis ===
- Abu al-Hasan al-Ash'ari
- Abu Mansur al-Maturidi
- Abu al-Yusr al-Bazdawi
- Abu al-Mu'in al-Nasafi
- Ibn Hibban
- Ibn Furak
- Abu Mansur al-Baghdadi
- Abu Ishaq al-Isfara'ini
- Abu al-Walid al-Baji
- Abu Bakr ibn al-Arabi
- Adud al-Din al-Iji
- 'Ala al-Din al-Baji
- Al-Bayhaqi
- Al-Baqillani
- Al-Qushayri
- Al-Shahrastani
- Al-Juwayni
- Ahmad al-Rifa'i
- Al-Ghazali
- Al-Baydawi
- Al-Maziri
- Ali Qushji
- Ali al-Qari
- Al-Sharif al-Jurjani
- Diya' al-Din al-Makki
- Fakhr al-Din al-Razi
- Sayf al-Din al-Amidi
- Izz al-Din ibn 'Abd al-Salam
- Taqi al-Din al-Subki
- Ibrahim al-Desuqi
- Taj al-Din al-Subki
- Jalal al-Din al-Dawani
- Zakariyya al-Ansari
- Ibn Aqil
- Ibn al-Jawzi
- Ibn Khaldun
- Ibn Tumart
- Ibn Arafa
- Ibn Ashir
- 'Illish
- Ibn Abi Zayd
- Qadi Ayyad
- Ibn Hajar al-Haytami
- Shams al-Din al-Samarqandi
- Najm al-Din 'Umar al-Nasafi
- Sa'd al-Din al-Taftazani
- Najm al-Din al-Qazwini al-Katibi
- Shihab al-Din al-Qarafi
- Abu Hayyan al-Gharnati
- Abu Ali al-Hassan al-Yusi
- Abdel Qadir al-Jilani
- Abd al-Rahman al-Thaalbi
- Abd al-Rahman al-Fasi
- Abd al-Ghani al-Nabulsi
- Al-Maqqari al-Tilmisani
- Al-Sha'rani
- Al-Bahūtī
- Al-Maydani
- Ad-Desouki
- Ahmad Sirhindi
- Ahmad al-Dardir
- Ibrahim al-Bajuri
- Abdullah ibn Alawi al-Haddad

- Shah Waliullah Dehlawi
- Ahmad Rida Khan
- Rahmatullah Kairanawi
- Muhammad Zahid al-Kawthari
- Muhammad Mayyara
- Murtada al-Zabidi
- Muhammad Abu Zahra
- Yusuf al-Nabhani
- Muhammad Metwally al-Sha'rawy
- Ahmed Deedat
- Abdullah al-Harari
- Muhammad Said Ramadan al-Bouti
- Muhammad Alawi al-Maliki
- Noah Qudah
- Ali Gomaa

=== Mu'tazilis ===
- Wasil ibn 'Ata'
- Al-Qadi 'Abd al-Jabbar
- Al-Jubba'i
- Al-Jahiz
- Al-Zamakhshari
- Ibrahim al-Nazzam

=== Others ===
- Abu Muslim
- Al-Dinawari
- Al-Farabi
- Sayyid Ali Hamadani
- Al-Kindi
- Ibn Hazm
- Ibn Sina
- Ibn Taymiya
- Ibn al-Qayyim

See also early Muslim philosophy, Islamic philosophy

== Early Sunni theologians and philosophers ==
- Abu Hanifa
- Al-Shafi‘i
- Malik ibn Anas
- Ahmad ibn Hanbal
- Dawud al-Zahiri
- Tahawi
- Junayd of Baghdad
- Harith al-Muhasibi

=== Imams of hadith ===
- Bukhari
- Muslim
- Abu Da'ud
- Tirmidhi
- Nasa'i
- Ibn Maja

== Medieval theologians and philosophers ==
- Al-Biruni
- Al-Battani (Albatenius)
- Al-Buzjani
- Al-Farabi (Alpharabius)
- Al-Farghani
- Al-Ghazali (Algazel)
- Al-Idrisi
- Al-Zarnuji
- Al-Khwarizmi (Algoritmi)
- Al-Kindi (Alkindus)
- Al-Masu'di
- Al-Mawardi
- Ibn al-Baitar
- Ibn al-Haytham (Alhazen)
- Ibn al-Nafis
- Ibn Khaldun
- Ibn Rushd (Averroes)
- Ibn Sina (Avicenna)
- Jalal al-Din Muhammad Rumi
- Kemalpaşazade
- Molla Fenari
- Omar Khayyám
- Sayyid Ali Hamadani (Preacher and traveller)

== Modern theologians ==
- Sa'id Foudah
- A F M Khalid Hossain
- Abdul Baqi Miftah
- Abdolkarim Soroush
- Abdur Rahman Bangladeshi
- Abdul Halim Bukhari
- Abdul Matin Chowdhury
- Abdul Qadeer Khan
- Ahmed Rida Khan
- Allama Khalid Mahmood
- Ashraf Ali Thanwi
- Akhtar Raza Khan
- Ali Shariati
- Alija Izetbegović
- Anwar Shah Kashmiri
- Bilal Philips
- Ebrahim Desai
- Fazlur Rahman
- Hussain Ahmad Madani
- Idries Shah
- Inayat Khan
- Ismail Al-Faruqi
- Israr Ahmed
- Junaid Babunagari
- Khaled Abou Al-Fadl
- Leila Ahmed
- Mahmudul Hasan
- Mamunul Haque
- Mahmud Hasan Deobandi
- Mawlana Muhammad Ilyas
- Mostafa Hosseini Tabatabaei
- Muhammad Abdul Wahhab
- Mohammed Amine Smaili
- Muhammad Asadullah Al-Ghalib
- Muhammad Ilyas al-Kandhlawi
- Rafi Usmani
- Muhammad Shafi
- Taqi Usmani
- Zakariyya Kandhlawi
- Muhammad Tahir-ul-Qadri
- Muzaffer Ozak
- Nurul Islam Olipuri
- Nasiruddin Albani
- Necmettin Erbakan (Millî Görüş)
- Nur Hossain Kasemi
- Nur Uddin Gohorpuri
- Shah Ahmad Shafi
- Shabbir Ahmad Usmani
- Said Nursi
- Sayyid Abul Ala Maududi
- Shams-ul-haq Azeemabadi
- Sherman Jackson
- Seyyed Hossein Nasr
- Siraj Wahaj
- Syed Muhammad Naquib al-Attas
- Syed Nazeer Husain
- Tariq Jameel
- Yusuf Motala
- Ziauddin Sardar

See also modern Islamic philosophy, Islamization of knowledge

== Shi'a imams ==
=== Athnā‘ashariyyah-The Twelve Imams ===
1. Ali ibn Abi Talib
2. Hasan ibn Ali
3. Husayn ibn Ali
4. Ali ibn Husayn Zayn al-Abidin
5. Muhammad al-Baqir
6. Jafar Sadiq
7. Musa al-Kazim
8. Ali al-Rida (Ali Raza)
9. Muhammad al-Taqi
10. Ali al-Hadi (Ali Naqi)
11. Hasan al-Askari
12. Muhammad al-Mahdi

=== Zaidiyyah imams ===
1. Ali ibn Abu Talib
2. Hasan ibn Ali
3. Husayn ibn Ali
4. Ali ibn Husayn Zayn al-Abidin
5. Zayd ibn Ali

=== Isma'ili imams ===
1. Ali ibn Abu Talib (Nizari Isma'ili and Qarmatian-Sevener only; Asās/Wāsīh in Musta'li Isma'ili)
2. Hasan ibn Ali (Qarmatian-Sevener and Musta'li Isma'ili only; Pir in Nizari)
3. Husayn ibn Ali
4. Ali ibn Husayn Zayn al-Abidin
5. Muhammad al-Baqir
6. Jafar Sadiq
7. Ismāʿīl ibn Jaʿfar
8. Maymūn Al-Qaddāḥ (Musta'li and Nizari Isma'ili only)

=== Others ===
- Al-Shaykh Al-Mufid
- Sharif al-Murtaza
- Nasir al-Din al-Tusi
- Al-Hilli
- Zurarah ibn A'yan
- Hisham ibn Hakam
- Agha Zia Addin Araghi
- Ja'far Sobhani

== Historiographers, political scientists, and sociologists ==
- Al-Masudi
- Ibn al-Tiqtaqa
- Ibn Hisham
- Ibn Ishaq
- Ibn Kathir
- Ibn Khaldoun
- Ibn Khallikan
- Mahdi ElMandjra
- Rashid-al-Din Hamadani
- Sayyid Qutb
- Tabari
- Usamah ibn Munqidh

== See also ==
- Kalam
- Aqidah
- List of people by belief
- List of Ash'aris and Maturidis
- List of Muslims
- Western Muslim scholars
