= Karramiyya =

Sect of Islam

Karramiyya (Arabic: كرّاميّه, romanized: Karrāmiyyah) was a Hanafi-Mujassim-Murji'ah sect in Islam which flourished in the central and eastern parts of the Islamic worlds, and especially in the Iranian regions, from the 9th century until the Mongol invasions in the 13th century.

The sect was founded by a Sistani named Muhammad ibn Karram (d. 896) who was a popular preacher in Khurasan in the 9th century in the vicinity of Nishapur. He later emigrated with many of his followers to Jerusalem. According to him, the Karrāmites were also called the "followers of Abū'Abdallāh" (aṣḥāb Abī'Abdallāh). Its main distribution areas were in Greater Khorasan, Transoxiana and eastern peripheral areas of Iran. Early Ghaznavids and the early Ghurid dynasty granted the Karrāmīyan rulership. The most important center of the community remained until the end of the 11th century Nishapur. After its decline, the Karrāmīya survived only in Ghazni and Ghor in the area of today's Afghanistan.

== Doctrine ==
The doctrine of the Karramiyya consisted of literalism and anthropomorphism. Ibn Karram considered that Allah was a substance and that He had a body (jism) finite in certain directions when He comes into contact with the Throne. This belief was rejected by more mainstream Sunni Muslim scholars and groups including: Abu Bakr al-Samarqandi (d. 268/881–2), al-Hakim al-Samarqandi (d. 342/953), 'Abd al-Qahir al-Baghdadi (d. 429/1037–8), the Ash'arites, and Maturidites in general.

Ibn Hajar al-Haytami stated that, "They believe that Allah is a body sitting on the Throne, touching it and resting on it, and then moves down every night during the last third of the night to the heavens, and then goes back to His place at dawn."

They also believed that Munkar and Nakir angels were actually the same as guardian angels on the right and left side of every person.

The Karramiyya also held the view that the world was eternal and that Allah's power was limited.

These beliefs were rejected by many Sunni theologians as heretical and eventually disappeared. The Karramiyya operated centers of worship and propagated asceticism.

Unlike other corporealist groups, the Karramiyya emphasised use of reason to defend their beliefs.

== See also ==
- Asas al-Taqdis
