= Abu Mansur al-Maturidi =

Islamic scholar and theologian (853–944)

Shaykh al-Islam Abu Mansur al-Maturidi Imam
- أبو منصور الماتريدي
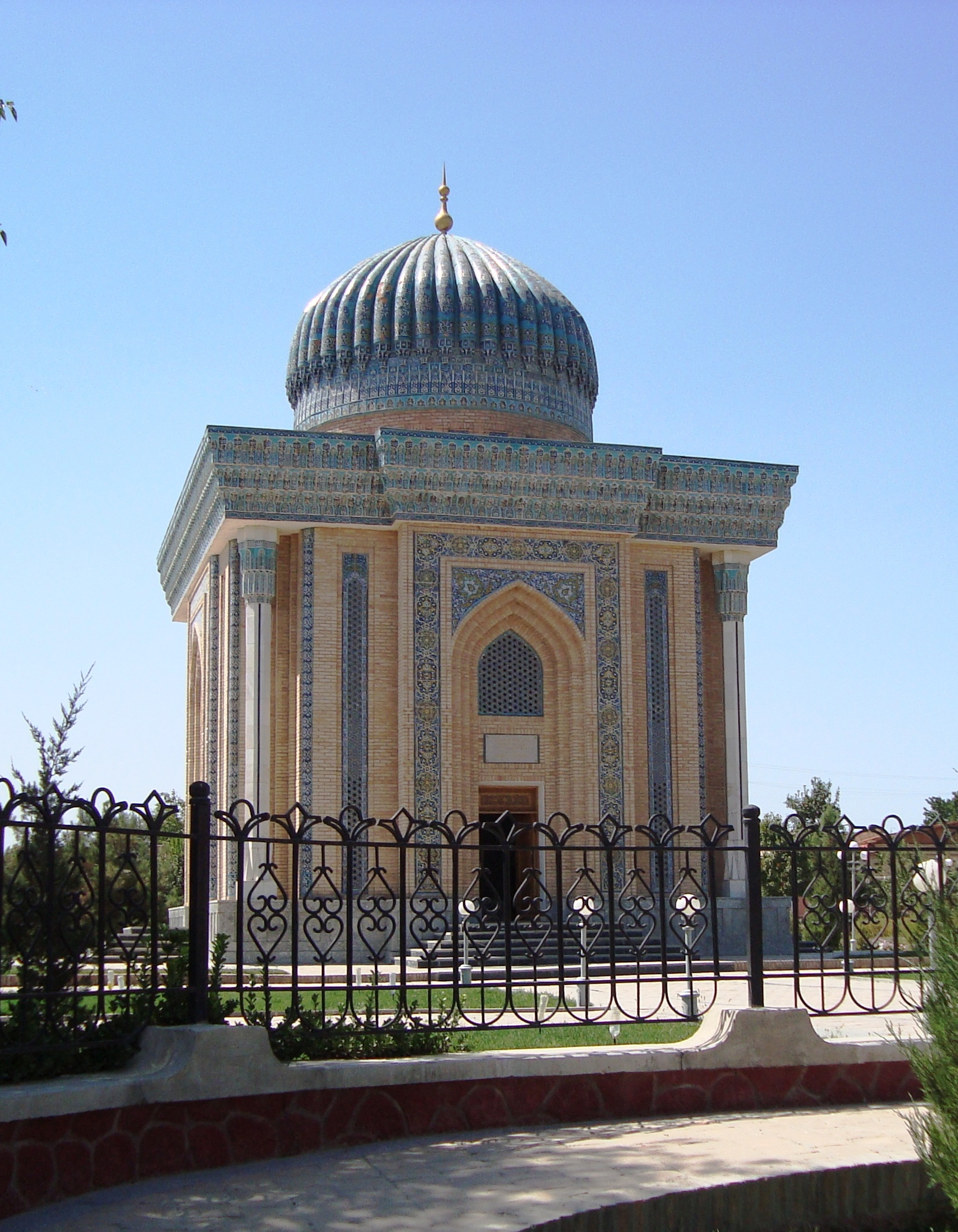
- Tomb of al-Maturidi, Samarkand
- Title: Shaykh al-Islam ('Shaykh of Islam'); Imam al-Huda ('Leader of Guidance')

Personal life
- Born: 852 CE (238 AH) Samarkand, Samanid Empire (modern-day Uzbekistan)
- Died: 944 CE (333 AH; aged 90–91) Samarkand, Samanid Empire (modern-day Uzbekistan)
- Resting place: Chokardiza cemetery, Samarkand, Uzbekistan
- Era: Islamic Golden Age (mid Samanid)
- Region: Samanid Empire
- Main interest(s): Theology; Jurisprudence; Philosophy
- Notable idea: Maturidism
- Notable works: Kitab al-Tawhid; Ta'wilat Ahl al-Sunna
- Occupation: Scholar; Jurist; Theologian

Religious life
- Religion: Sunni Islam
- Denomination: Sunni
- Jurisprudence: Hanafi
- Creed: Independent (eponym of the Maturidi school)

Senior posting
- Influenced by: Abu Hanifa; Abu Bakr al-Samarqandi
- Influenced: All Maturidis
- Arabic name
- Personal (Ism): Muḥammad محمد
- Patronymic (Nasab): ibn Muḥammad ibn Maḥmūd بن محمد بن محمود
- Teknonymic (Kunya): Abū Manṣūr أبو منصور
- Toponymic (Nisba): al-Māturīdī al-Samarqandī الماتريدي السمرقندي

Imam Abu Mansur al-Maturidi (Note: Full name Abū Manṣūr Muḥammad ibn Muḥammad ibn Maḥmūd al-Māturīdī al-Samarqandī (Arabic: أبو منصور محمد بن محمد بن محمود الماتريدي السمرقندي).) (Arabic: أبو منصور الماتريدي, romanized: Abū Manṣūr al-Māturīdī; 853–944; AH 333) was a Hanafi jurist and theologian, and the eponymous founder of the Maturidi school of kalam in Sunni Islam. A contemporary of al-Ashʿarī, he established an important school of orthodox, conservative theology that accorded a significant, though not paramount, role to human reason. His nisba derives from Māturīd, a district of Samarkand. His works include Tafsir al-Maturidi, a classical exegesis of the Qur'an, and Kitāb al-Tawḥīd. The theological school associated with him remains one of the three principal Sunni schools of theology alongside Ash'arism and Atharism.

Al-Maturidi opposed the Muʿtazilites, employing forms of rational argument similar to their own in order to contest their doctrines. The differences between the Ashʿarite and Maturidite schools were traditionally reckoned at thirteen, the most substantial concerning divine and human agency: Ashʿarism emphasized the absolute power of the will of Allah, whereas Maturidism emphasized human freedom and responsibility. In this connection, the Ashʿarites were characterized as saying, "I am a believer if God wills" (in shāʾ Allāh), while the Muʿtazilites could say, "I know with truth [ḥaqqan] that I am a believer". Al-Ashʿarī nevertheless accepted a somewhat different doctrine of acquisition (kasb).

Al-Maturidi affirmed the divine attributes described in the Qur'an, while maintaining that their mode cannot be comprehended by human beings. Thus, in relation to descriptions such as God sitting upon his throne, he accepted the principle of bilā kayf, "without knowing how".

== Name ==
Abū Manṣūr al-Māturīdī's epithet or nisba refers to Māturīd or Māturīt, a locality in Samarkand (today Uzbekistan). His full name was Muḥammad ibn Muḥammad ibn Maḥmūd and he adopted the nisba al-Māturīdī and al-Ḥanafī. he is also known by the titles Shaykh al-Islam ('Shaykh of Islam'), Imam al-Huda ('Imam of Guidance'), and Imam Ahl al-Sunna wa-l-Jama'a ('Imam of the People of the Prophetic Way and Community').

== Teachers ==
He studied under his teachers, Muhammad bin Muqatil al-Razi (d. 248 H/ 662 CE), Abu Nasr al-Ayadi "al-Faqih al-Samarqandi" (d. 260 H?), Nusayr bin Yahya al-Balkhi (d. 268 H/ 881 CE), and Abu Bakr al-Juzjani (d. 250 H?). He narrated all of Abu Hanifa's books such as Kitab al-Alim wa Mut'alim and al-Wasiyya from his teachers in authentic chains which al-Bazdawi mentions in his book Usul al-Dīn.

His chains to Abu Hanifa are given as follows:

1. From Muhammad bin Muqatil al-Razi (d. 248 H), from Muhammad al-Shaybani (d. 189 H), from Abu Hanifa (d. 150 H).
2. From Abu Nasr al-Ayadi (d. 260 H?), Nusayr al-Balkhi (d. 268 H) and Abu Bakr al-Juzjani (d. 250 H?), who all took from Abu Sulayman al-Juzjani (d. 200 H?), who took from both Muhammad al-Shaybani and Abu Yusuf (d. 182 H), who both took from Abu Hanifa.
3. From Muhammad bin Muqatil al-Razi and Nusayr al-Balkhi, who additionally both took from Abu Muti al-Hakam al-Balkhi (d. 199 H) and Abu Muqatil Hafs al-Samarqandi (d. 208 H), who both took from Abu Hanifa.
4. From Abu Nasr al-Ayadi, who took from Abu Ahmad bin Ishaq al-Juzjani (died mid-third century), who took directly from Muhammad al-Shaybani, who took from Abu Hanifa.

== Students ==
Among his students: Ali bin Said Abu al-Hasan al-Rustughfani, Abu Muhammad Abdal-Karim bin Musa bin Isa al-Bazdawi, and Abu al-Qasim al-Hakim al-Samarqandi.

== Life ==
Al‑Māturīdī was born at Maturid, a village or quarter in the neighbourhood of Samarkand. According to one biography, he is known to be a descendant of Abu Ayyub al-Ansari. Relatively little is known about the life of al-Māturīdī, as the sources available "do not read as biographies, but rather as lists of works that have been enlarged upon by brief statements on his personage and a few words of praise." What is evident, however, is that the theologian lived the life of a pure scholar, as "nothing indicates that he held any public office, nor that he possessed more disciples, popularity, or association with the Sāmānid court of Bukhārā than anyone else." It is accepted, moreover, that al-Māturīdī had two principal teachers, namely Abū Bakr al-Jūzjānī and Abū Naṣr Aḥmad b. al-ʿAbbās al-ʿIyāḍī (d. ca. 874–892), both of whom played significant roles in the shaping of al-Māturīdī's theological views. Al-Māturīdī is said to have lived the life of an ascetic (zāhid), and various sources attribute numerous miracles (karāmāt) to him. Although he is not usually considered a mystic, it is nevertheless very possible that al-Māturīdī had some interaction with the Sufis of his area, as "Hanafite theology in the region could not always be sharply separated from mystical tendencies," and many of the most important Hanafi jurists of the area were also Sufi mystics.

== Theology ==
al-Māturīdī defined faith (īmān) as taṣdīḳ bi ’l-ḳalb or "inner assent, expressed by verbal confession (ịḳrār bi ’l-lisān)." According to al-Māturīdī, moreover, Islamic actions (practices or worship) (aʿmāl) are not a part of faith. Additionally, al-Māturīdī held that "faith cannot decrease nor increase in substance, though it may be said to increase through renewal and repetition."

Al-Māturīdī supported using allegorical interpretation with respect to the anthropomorphic expressions in the Quran, though he rejected many of the interpretations the Mutazilites would reach using this method. In other instances, al-Māturīdī espoused using the traditionalist bilā kayf method of reading scripture, which insisted on "unquestioning acceptance of the revealed text." Al-Māturīdī further refuted the Mutazilites in his defense of the Attributes of God "as real and eternally subsisting" in the Essence of God (ḳāʾima bi ’l-d̲h̲āt). His chief theological divergence from Ashʿarī was that he held the attributes of essence and action to be "equally eternal and subsistent in the Divine Essence." Thus, "he insisted that the expressions 'God is eternally the Creator' and 'God has been creating from eternity (lam yazal k̲h̲āliḳan)' are equally valid, even though the created world is temporal." Furthermore, al-Māturīdī staunchly defended the notion of non-theophanic vision of God (ruʾya) against the Mutazilites, and "consistently rejected the possibility of idrāk, which he understood as grasping, of God by the eyes."

Contrary to popular assumption, al-Māturīdī was not a student of al-Ash'ari. The historian al-Bayadi (d. 1078 H) emphasised this saying, "al-Māturīdī is not Ash'ari's follower, as many people would tend to think. He had upheld Sunni Islam long before Ashari, he was a scholar to thoroughly explain and systematically develop Abu Hanifa's and his followers' school".

== Work ==
When al-Māturīdī was growing up there was an emerging reaction against some sects, notably Mu'tazilis, Qarmati, and Shi'a. Al-Māturīdī, with other two preeminent scholars, wrote especially on the creed of Islam, the other two being Abu al-Hasan al-Ash'ari in Iraq, and Ahmad ibn Muhammad al-Tahawi in Egypt.

While al-Ash'ari were Sunni together with al-Māturīdī, he constructed his own theology taking from Abu Hanifa's school and systematized it which differed from his contemporary imam al-Tahawi who affirmed the beliefs of Abu Hanifa. Regardless, both were Hanafi in their creed but with different approaches. Gimaret argued that al-Ash'ari enunciated that God creates the individual's power (qudra), will, and the actual act, which according to Hye, gives way to a fatalist school of theology, which was later put in a consolidated form by Al Ghazali. According to Encyclopædia Britannica however, al-Ashari held the doctrine of Kasb as an explanation for how free will and predestination can be reconciled. Al-Māturīdī, followed in Abu Hanifa's footsteps, and presented the "notion that God was the creator of man's acts, although man possessed his own capacity and will to act." Al-Māturīdī and al-Ash'ari also separated from each other in the issue of the attributes of God, as well as some other minor issues.

Later, with the impact of Turkic society states such as Great Seljuq Empire and Ottoman Empire, Hanafi-Maturidi school spread to greater areas where the Hanafi school of law is prevalent, such as Pakistan, Afghanistan, Central Asia, South Asia, Balkan, Russia, China, Caucasus and Turkey.

Al-Māturīdī had immense knowledge of dualist beliefs (Sanawiyya) and of other old Persian religions. His Kitāb al-Tawḥīd in this way has become a primary source for modern researchers with its rich materials about Iranian Manicheanism (Mâniyya), a group of Brahmans (Barähima), and some controversial personalities such as Ibn al-Rawandi, Abu Isa al-Warraq, and Muhammad b. Shabib.

== Legacy and veneration ==
His school became the dominant Sunni school of Islamic theology in Central Asia, and later enjoyed a preeminent status as the theological school of choice for both the Ottoman Empire and the Mughal Empire.

Al-Māturīdī was known as Shaykh al-Islām and Imām al-Hudā ("Leader of Right Guidance"). He was one of the two foremost Imams of the Sunni Islam in his time, along with Abū al-Ḥasan al-Ashʿarī in matters of theological inquiry. In contrast al-Ashʿarī, who was a Shāfiʿī jurist, al-Māturīdī adhered to the eponymous school of jurisprudence founded by Abū Ḥanīfa al-Nuʿmān, and to his creed (ʿaqīdah) as transmitted and elaborated by the Ḥanafī Muslim theologians of Balkh and Transoxania. It was this theological doctrine which al-Māturīdī codified, systematized, and used to refute not only the opinions of the Muʿtazilites, the Karramites, and other heterodox groups, but also non-Islamic theologies such as those of Chalcedonian Christianity, Miaphysitism, Manichaeanism, Marcionism, and Bardaisanism.

Although there was in the medieval period "a tendency to suppress al-Māturīdī's name and to put Ashʿarī forward as the champion of Islam against all heretics," except in Transoxiana, Maturidism gradually "came to be widely recognised as the second orthodox Sunni theological school" besides Ashʿarīsm. It is evident from the surviving fifteenth-century accounts of al-Māturīdī's tomb in the cemetery of Jākardīza in Samarkand that the theologian's tomb was "visited ... and held in honor for a long time" throughout the medieval period. This veneration of the theologian seems to have arisen out of traditions preserved by several later scholars which detailed al-Māturīdī's wisdom and spiritual abilities. For example, Abul Muīn al-Nasafī (d. 1114) stated that Maturidi's spiritual gifts were "immeasurably plentiful" and that "God singled him out with miracles (kāramāt), gifts of grace (mawāhib), divine assistance (tawfiq), and guidance (irshād, tashdīd)."

Contemporary Salafism and Wahhabism, however, tends to be very critical of al-Māturīdī's legacy in Sunni Islam due to their aversion towards using any rational thought in matters of theology, which they deem to be heretical, despite this antagonism being a position that conflicts with the consensus of Sunnism throughout history. As such, it is often said that mainstream "orthodox Sunnism" constitutes the followers of the theological traditions of al-Māturīdī and Ashʿarī, while Salafism and Wahhabism have often been interpreted by the proponents of the two major schools to be minority splinter theological traditions opposed to the mainstream. Furthermore, the minor theoretical differences between the theological formulations of al-Māturīdī and Ashʿarī are often deemed by their respective followers to be superficial rather than real, whence "the two schools are equally orthodox" in traditional Sunnism. The traditional Sunni point of view is summarized in the words of the twentieth-century Islamic publisher Munīr ʿAbduh Agha, who stated: "There is not much [doctrinal] difference between the Ashʿarīs and Māturīdīs, hence both groups are now called People of the Sunna and the Community."

== Writings ==
- Kitab al-Tawhid ('Book of Monotheism')
- Ta'wilat Ahl al-Sunnah or Ta'wilat al-Qur'an ('Book of the Interpretations of the Quran')
- Kitāb Radd Awa'il al-Adilla, a refutation of a Mu'tazili book
- Radd al-Tahdhib fi al-Jadal, another refutation of a Mu'tazili book
- Kitāb Bayan Awham al-Mu'tazila ('Book of Exposition of the Errors of Mu'tazila)
- Kitāb al-Maqalat
- Ma'akhidh al-Shara'i' in Usul al-Fiqh
- Al-Jadal fi Usul al-Fiqh
- Radd al-Usul al-Khamsa, a refutation of Abu Muhammad al-Bahili's exposition of the Five Principles of the Mu'tazila
- Radd al-Imama, a refutation of the Shi'i conception of the office of Imam;
- Al-Radd 'ala Usul al-Qaramita
- Radd Wa'id al-Fussaq, a refutation of the Mu'tazili doctrine that all grave sinners will be eternally in hell fire.

== See also ==
- Maturidi
- Abu Hanifa
- Abu al-Mu'in al-Nasafi
- Abu Bakr al-Samarqandi
- 2020 International Maturidi Conference
- Imam Maturidi International Scientific Research Center
- List of Maturidis
- List of Muslim theologians
