= Kalam =

Study of Islamic doctrines

Ilm al-kalam (Note: Arabic: عِلْم ٱلْكَلَام, romanized: ʿilm al-kalām, lit. 'science of discourse') or ilm al-lahut, (Note: Arabic: عِلْم ٱللَّاهُوت, romanized: ʿilm al-lāhūt, lit. 'science of theology') often shortened to kalam, is the scholastic, speculative, or rational study of Islamic theology (aqida). It can also be defined as the science that studies the fundamental doctrines of Islamic faith (usul al-din), proving their validity, or refuting doubts regarding them. Kalām was born out of the need to establish and defend the tenets of Islam against philosophical doubters and non-Muslims, and also to defend against heretical and religious innovations (bidʿah). A scholar of kalam is referred to as a mutakallim (plural mutakallimun), a role distinguished from those of Islamic philosophers and jurists.

While traditional Islamic sources attribute the origin of the term kalām primarily to internal disputations over the divine speech (kalām Allāh) and dialectical exchanges (idārat al-kalām), comparative religion and modern scholarship (such as Harry A. Wolfson and Josef van Ess) contextualize the formation of Ilm al-Kalām within the broader Late Antique milieu. The central debates surrounding the uncreated or created nature of the Quran closely mirror the Hellenistic and Patristic evolution of the Logos concept. Just as Christian theology grappled with the divine Word incarnate in Jesus, early Muslim mutakallimūn elevated the divine speech into an ontological and dogmatic status, shaping a unique theological framework where scripture itself assumed the absolute, uncreated authority traditionally ascribed to the Logos.

After its first beginnings in the late Umayyad period, the Kalām experienced its rise in the early Abbasid period, when the Caliph al-Mahdi commissioned Mutakallimūn to write books against the followers of Iranian religions, and the Barmakid vizier Yahya ibn Khalid held Kalām discussions with members of various religions and confessional groups in his house. By the 10th century, the Muʿtazilites were main pioneers of 'Kalam' during the early formative period of Islam. Soon after, two new important Sunni Kalām schools emerged: the Ashʿaris and the Maturidis. They positioned themselves against the growing Neoplatonic and Aristotelian philosophy within the Mu'tazilites and elevated the "Kalām science" (ʿilm al-kalām) as an acceptable ranking science in mainstream Sunni discourse. Some of the arguments of these Mutakallimūn also found their way into Jewish and Christian theological discussions in the Middle Ages. Kalām science by the early modern period was essentially limited to the study of manuals and commentaries, from the late 19th century onwards various reform thinkers appeared in British India and the Ottoman Empire who called for the founding of a "new Kalām".

== Definition ==
=== Definitions of Kalām in chronological order ===
Author with death date	Region	Kalām is...	Arabic or Persian original text
al-Farabi (d. 950)	Syria	"a mental ability through which man can help the established views and actions expressed by the founder of a religion to triumph and can refute everything that contradicts them by statements"	malaka yaqtadir bi-hā al-insān ʿalā nuṣrat al-ārā wa-l-afʿāl al-maḥdūda allatī ṣarraḥa bi-hā wāḍiḥ al-milla wa-tazyīf kull mā ḫālafa-hā bi-l-aqāwīl
Abu al-Hassan al-Amiri (d. 992)	Baghdad, Nishapur	"the linguistic effort to defend religion"	al-muǧāhada ʿan ad-dīn bi-l-lisān
Abu Hayyan al-Tawhidi (d. 1023)	Baghdad, Rayy, Shiraz	"a way of considering the foundations of religion, in which the deliberation is based on reason alone."	bāb min al-iʿtibār fī uṣūl ad-dīn yadūr an-naẓar fīhi ʿalā maḥḍ al-ʿaql
Abu al-Yusr al-Bazdawi (d. 1099)	Transoxiana	"the explanation of those questions which constitute the foundations of religion, which it is an individual duty to learn."	bayān al-masāʾil allatī hiya uṣūl ad-dīn allatī hiya taʿallumuhā farḍ ʿain
Sharaf al-Din Ibn al-Tilimsani al-Fihri (d. 1260)	Egypt	"the knowledge of the evidence of divinity and divine messengership, as well as the things on which their knowledge depends, namely the possibility and temporal origin of the world and the refutation of everything that is incompatible with this"	al-ʿilm bi-ṯubūt al-ilāhīya wa-r-risāla wa-mā yatawaqqaf maʿrifatuhumā ʿalaihi min ǧawāz al-ʿālam wa-ḥudūṯihī wa-ibṭāl mā yunāqiḍ ḏālik
Shams al-Din al-Samarqandi (d. 1303)	Samarkand	"a science that investigates the nature and attributes of God and the states of contingent entities in the beginning and at the return according to the law of Islam"	ʿilm yubḥaṯ fīhi ʿan ḏāt Allāh wa-ṣifātihī wa-aḥwāl al-mumkināt fī l-mubtadaʾ wa-l-maʿād ʿalā qānūn al-islām
Adud al-Din al-Iji (d. 1355)	Īj near Shiraz	"the science by which one can prove religious dogmas by citing arguments and averting doubts"	ʿilm yuqtadar maʿa-hū ʿalā iṯbāt al-ʿaqāʾid ad-dīnīya, bi-īrād al-ḥuǧaǧ wa-dafʿ aš-šubah
al-Taftazani (d. 1390)	Taftazan	"the knowledge of religious dogmas based on certain evidence"	al-ʿilm bi-l-ʿaqāʾid ad-dīnīya ʿan al-adilla al-yaqīnīya
Ibn 'Arafa (d. 1401)	Tunis	"the knowledge of the decrees of divinity, the sending of messengers, their truthfulness in all their communications, and that on which any of them is specifically based, as well as the establishment of their proofs by a skill that is believed to avert doubts and resolve uncertainties"	al-ʿilm bi-aḥkām al-ulūhīya wa-irsāl ar-rusul wa-ṣidqihā fī kull aḫbārihā wa-mā yatawaqqaf šaiʾ min ḏālik ʿalaihi ḫāṣṣan bihī wa-taqrīr adillatihā bi-qūwa hiya maẓinna li-radd aš-šubuhāt
Ibn Khaldun (d. 1406)	Tunis	"a science that involves the disputation of religious dogmas with rational arguments and the refutation of innovators who deviate from the teachings of the ancients and the Sunnis."	ʿilm yataḍamman al-ḥiǧāǧ ʿan al-ʿaqāʾid al-īmānīya bi-l-adilla al-ʿaqlīya wa-r-radd ʿalā l-mubtadiʿa al-munḥarifīn fī l-iʿtiqādāt ʿan maḏāhib as-salaf wa-ahl as-sunna
Ibn al-Humām (d. 1457)	Egypt	"the knowledge of the individual about the dogmas of the Islamic religion that are incumbent upon him through the evidence"	maʿrifat an-nafs mā ʿalaihā min al-ʿaqāʾid al-mansūba ilā dīn al-islām ʿan al-adilla
Taşköprüzade (d. 1561)	Ottoman Empire	"the science of proving religious truths by providing arguments for them and removing doubts from them"	ʿilm yuqtadar maʿa-hū ʿalā iṯbāt al-ḥaqāʾiq ad-dīnīya, bi-īrād al-ḥuǧaǧ ʿalai-hā wa-dafʿ aš-šubah ʿan-hā
Abd al-Razzaq Lahiji (d. 1661)	Iran	"a theoretical skill with which one can prove religious dogmas"	ṣināʿa naẓarīya yuqtadar bi-hā ʿalā iṯbāt al-ʿaqāʾid ad-dīnīya
al-Tahānawī (d. 1745)	North India	"a science by which one can prove religious dogmas to one's fellow men by citing arguments and averting doubts"	ʿilm yuqtadar maʿa-hū ʿalā iṯbāt al-ʿaqāʾid ad-dīnīya ʿalā l-ġair, bi-īrād al-ḥuǧaǧ wa-dafʿ aš-šubah.
Morteza Motahhari (d. 1979)	Iran	"a science that discusses Islamic dogmas, i.e. what one must believe in from an Islamic point of view, in such a way that it explains, proves and defends them"	ʿilmi ast ke darbāre-ye ʿaqāyed-e eslāmī yaʿnī ānče az naẓar-e eslām bāyad bedān moʿtaqed būd va īmān dāšt, baḥs̱ mīkonad be īn naḥw ke ānhā toużīḥ mīdehad va darbāre-ye ānhā estedlāl mīkonad va az ānhā defāʿ mīnamāyad

=== Kalām as apologetics ===
According to several of the definitions given above, kalām has an apologetic function: it serves to defend one's own religious views. This apologetic function is particularly evident in the philosophers al-Farabi (d. 950) and Abu al-Hassan al-Amiri (d. 992). The former sees it as a mental ability through which man can refute everything that contradicts the views and actions established by the founder of the religion, the latter as "the defence of religion with the tongue". In the definitions of the Ashʿarite scholar Adud al-Din al-Iji (d. 1355), the Ottoman scholar Taşköprüzade (d. 1561) and the Indian scholar at-Tahānawī (around 1745), who worked in Iran, kalām has the task of averting doubts from religious dogmas or truths. Against the background of such definitions, the French orientalist Louis Gardet judged that the function of kalām as a defensive "apology" could not be overestimated. The view that the "fundamental character" of the Kalām consists of "defensive apology" is also the declared leitmotif of the French handbook Introduction à la théologie musulmane, co-authored by Gardet and M.M Anawati in 1948.

The Indian scholar ʿAbd an-Nabī al-Ahmadnagarī (d. 1759) even believed that the value of the Kalam was limited to this apologetic function alone. The great Mutakallimūn, he explains in his encyclopedia Dustūr al-ʿulamā, never justified or authenticated their doctrines with arguments from the Kalam, since the sole purpose of the Kalam was to silence the adversary and bring the stubborn to their knees. The great Mutakallimūn, on the other hand, drew their doctrines solely from the "lamp of prophethood". Such statements can also be found in al-Ghazali. Thus, in his work Jawahir al-Qur'an (The Jewels of the Qur'an ), he judged that the purpose of the science of kalam was "to protect the beliefs of the masses from disruption by innovators". On the other hand, this science was never about "revealing the truths".

=== Kalām as the science of religious foundations or dogmas ===
Several Muslim authors defined kalām by its relationship to the "fundamentals of religion" (Uṣūl al-Dīn). For example, Abu Hayyan al-Tawhidi (d. 1023) described the science of kalām as "a way of contemplating the fundamentals of religion in which deliberation is based on reason alone." Abu al-Yusr al-Bazdawi (d. 1099) defined it as "the explanation of those questions which constitute the fundamentals of religion, which it is an individual duty to learn."

Ibn al-Athir (d. 1233) in his book al-Lubāb fī Tahḏīb al-Ansāb was the first to define kalām science as "the science of the foundations of religion" (ʿilm Uṣūl al-Dīn). Ibn Khallikan (d. 1282) and Siraj al-Din Urmavi (d. 1283) even equated kalām science with the foundations of religion itself. The equation of ʿilm al-kalām and ʿilm uṣūl al-dīn is also found in the catalogue of the Ottoman Palace Library from the beginning of the 16th century, where the section containing the books on kalām was entitled "Section of the Books of the Science of the Foundations of Religion, i.e. the Science of Kalām". This classification probably also influenced the Ottoman scholars Taşköprüzade and Saçaklızāde (d. 1732), who also equated kalām science and the "science of the foundations of religion" in their Arabic scientific encyclopedias. At-Tahānawī explains this equation by saying that the Kalām is the basis of the religious legal sciences and that they are based on it.

Some later scholars defined the kalām science of dogmas. For Adud al-Din al-Iji (d. 1355), kalām is "the science of proving religious dogmas by citing arguments and removing doubts." In a slightly modified form, this definition was also adopted by the Ottoman scholar Tashköprüzāde (d. 1561) and the Indian scholar at-Tahānawī (c. 1745). For al-Taftazani (d. 1390), Kalām is "the knowledge of religious dogmas based on certain evidence", for Ibn Khaldun (d. 1406) "a science that includes the disputation of the dogmas of faith with rational arguments" and for Morteza Motahhari (d. 1979) "a science that discusses the Islamic dogmas [...] in such a way that it explains, proves and defends them".

=== Theories about the origin of the term ===
In Arabic, the term Kalām generally means "speech, conversation, debate." There are different theories as to why this term came to be used to describe the discipline that deals with the rational justification of one's own religious doctrines:

- Al-Shahrastani (d. 1153) suggested that the name was coined by the Mu'tazila. They called this science by this name either because the speech of God was the main question around which their disputations and controversies revolved, so that the whole science was called by it.
- Ibn at-Tilimsanī (d. 1260) considered three different possibilities: 1. the name Kalām comes from the fact that the Mutakallimūn began the chapters in their books with the phrase: "Chapter of speech about..." ( bāb al-kalām fī... ); 2. When the Zahirites were asked about one of the problems of this science, they replied: "That is that about which we are forbidden to speak". This happened repeatedly, so that after a time it was called "the science of (forbidden) speech", with the expression "forbidden" eventually being dropped; 3. Science was called ʿilm al-kalām because its learning is one of the most important means of bringing out the intellectual power of speech by which man is distinguished from other living beings.
- Al-Taftazani (d. 1390) gives a total of eight explanations for the name Kalām in his commentary on the confession of an-Nasafī, including the one that this science takes place solely in discussion ( mubāḥaṯa ) and exchange of speech ( idārat al-kalām ) and thus differs from other sciences that can also be practiced in the form of reflection ( taʾammul ) and reading of books ( muṭālaʿat al-kutub ). Another possibility that he discusses is that this science was considered to be speech par excellence because of the strength of its evidence, just as one says of the stronger of two statements: "This is the speech".
- Ibn Khaldun (d. 1406) suggested that the science of kalām was so called either because the fight against innovations did not require action, but was achieved solely through "speech" (kalām).
- Morteza Motahhari (d. 1979) stated the reason why the name originated from the habit of its scholars speaking (kalām), which is the opposite of silence and the Kalām scholars made statements on questions of faith where silence would have been necessary, imitating the Companions of the Prophet and the Muslims of the second generation, who had also remained silent on the matter.

According to Josef van Ess, the many explanations given by Arab scholars "clearly demonstrate the perplexity of native philologists and theologians when faced with the term kalām". As for Western scholarship, Tjitze de Boer and Duncan Black MacDonald suggested that the term kalām was derived from the Greek word logos. Arent Jan Wensinck, on the other hand, rejected the view that the term kalām could have anything to do with logos or its derivatives in 1932, and argued that it had arisen "through the development of Arabic terminology itself". Louis Gardet and M.-M. Anawati considered the first possibility of derivation mentioned by Ibn at-Tilimsānī to be the most likely and suspected that kalām initially meant "speech about..." and then, through antonomasia, became "discourse" per se (about the things of God). W. Montgomery Watt took a similar path of explanation to Ibn Taymiyyah when he wrote about the term mutakalli: "Undoubtedly this was once a derisive name, perhaps creating the image of people 'who talk forever.' Eventually, however, it became accepted as a neutral term."

== History ==
=== The question of origin ===
1. Maimonides (d. 1204) believed that the Kalām was actually of Christian origin and only later became known to Muslims through translations. Franz August Schmölders rejected this theory as implausible as early as 1840 in his Essai sur les écoles philosophiques chez les Arabes.
2. According to Ibn Khaldūn (d. 1406), the science of kalam arose from the fact that disagreements about the details of the doctrines of faith arose in the period after the first Muslims. Most of these disagreements were, in his opinion, caused by ambiguous Quranic verses (Muḥkam and Mutashabih). They led to dispute, disputation and rational argumentation.
3. Mohammed Abed al-Jabri (d. 2010) assumes that the Kalam arose in the middle of the 7th century, immediately after the arbitration that ended the war between Ali ibn Abi Talib and Mu'awiya. During this period, Arab political discourse began to use religion as a mediator. The various parties sought religious legitimacy for their positions, which was the first step in the theoretical formation of what was later called the science of Kalam. Thus, in its historical reality, this science is not just a discourse on the doctrine of faith, but a "practice of politics in religion".

In fact, the origins of the kalām are obscure. This is also due to the fact that the specifically theological meaning of the words kalām and mutakallim was very slow to gain acceptance. Mutakallim initially only referred to a "speaker with a specific function".

In the anonymous Aḫbār al-ʿAbbās wa-waladihī, which dates from the eighth century, it is reported that when Abu Muslim (d. 755) wanted to establish himself in Merv, he sent mutakallimūn from his followers into the city to win the population over to their cause and make it clear to them that they were following the Sunnah and acting according to the truth. Shlomo Pines has concluded that the term originally arose in Abū Muslim's army and referred to political and religious propagandists such as the Dawah.

However, there are reports that indicate that the culture of kalām existed before this. The Arab historian Abu Zakariya al-Azdi (d. 945) cites a report according to which the Umayyad caliph Umar ibn Abd al-Aziz (r. 717–720) is said to have said: "I have argued and spoken with the people. Indeed, I love to speak with the Shia." The fact that the verb kallama is used here for "to speak with", from which the word kalām is derived, is seen by Josef van Ess as an indication that the specifically theological meaning of the kalām concept may have already developed at this time.

According to a report quoted in the Kitab al-Aghani by Abu al-Faraj al-Isfahani (d. 967), there were six representatives of the Kalam (aṣḥāb al-kalām) in Basra: the two Muʿtazilites Amr ibn Ubayd and Wasil ibn Ata, the poet Bashshar ibn Burd, Salih ibn Abd al-Quddus and Abdul Karim bin Abi Al-Awja', and a man from the tribe of Azd who was inclined towards Sumanīya, an Indian doctrine, and who made his house available to the group for their meetings. Since Wāsil died around 748, the Kalām must have existed in the late Umayyad period if this report is authentic.

In two narrations cited by Abdullah Ansari (d. 1089), Amr ibn Ubayd is identified as the one who "invented these innovations of kalām". Abu Hanifa is said to have cursed ʿAmr ibn ʿUbaid for "opening the way for people to speak (kalām) about what it is not their business to speak about." Ibn Taymiyya (d. 1328), on the other hand, believed that the special type of argumentation that characterizes the Kalam first appeared at the beginning of the second Islamic century with Jaʿd ibn Dirham (d. 724) and Jahm bin Safwan (d. 746). From them it then reached Amr ibn Ubayd and Wasil ibn Ata. According to the Ottoman scholar Taşköprüzade (d. 1561), the spread of the Kalam began as early as the year 100 of the Hijra (= 718/19 AD) through the Muʿtazila and the Qadariya, with Wasil ibn Ata again playing the decisive role. However, neither Wasil ibn Ata nor any other persons mentioned here have recorded book titles or sayings that indicate that they themselves used the term kalām as a name for a particular science or knowledge culture.

According to a report quoted by al-Masudi (d. 956) in his work The Meadows of Gold, the Abbasid caliph al-Mahdi (r. 775–785) was the first ruler to commission Mutakallimūn representing Islam to write books against Mulhid from the circle of the Manichaeans, Bardesanites and Marcionites and to refute their arguments. The reason for this was that at that time writings of these groups had spread and were being translated from New Persian and Middle Persian into Arabic.

=== Formative years ===
In early Islam, the Ahl al-Kalām or "Kalamites" essentially referred to the Muʿtazila. Historian Daniel W. Brown describes Ahl al-Kalām as one of three main groups engaged in polemical disputes over sources of authority in Islamic law during the second century of Islam: the Ahl al-Ra'y and Ahl al-Hadith being the other two. (Brown also describes the Muʿtazila as "the later ahl al-Kalām", suggesting the ahl al-Kalām were forerunners of the Muʿtazilites.)

In the times of the Abbasid Caliphate (750–1258 AD), the discipline of Kalām arose in an "attempt to grapple" with several "complex problems" early in the history of Islam, according to historian Majid Fakhry. One was how to rebut arguments "leveled at Islam by pagans, Christians and Jews". Another was how to deal with (what some saw as the conflict between) the predestination of sinners to hell on the one hand and "divine justice" on the other (some asserting that to be punished for what is beyond someone's control is unjust). Also Kalam sought to make "a systematic attempt to bring the conflict in data of revelation (in the Quran and the Traditions) into some internal harmony". Other factors that might have led the establishment of kalam was an effort by some Islamic scholars to oppose the thoughts of Zandaqa in the Islamic world.

Later schools of Kalam like the Kullabis, Asharites and Maturidis representing as Sunni Islam would develop systems that would defend the core orthodox creedal points of Islam completely on rational grounds, and were open to engaging in kalam in accordance to the Quran and Sunnah. This was unlike the Mutazilites, whose kalam instead prioritised reason over revelation to the point where the Quran and hadith would only be accepted if it aligned with their interpretation of rationalism. The Hanbali school and the followers of Ahmad Ibn Hanbal would generally avoid kalam and philosophical talk all together, seeing it as an innovation, and only address it out of necessity. However, Ahmad ibn Hanbal also provided an episode of long feud of Mu'tazila Quran creationism doctrine opposed by the scripturalists (Atharism) doctrine that Quran as sifat (attribution) of God which championed by Ahmad ibn Hanbal, the founder of the Hanbali school. Ibn Battah has recorded in his work, Al-Ibāna , that Ahmad ibn Hanbal has instructed his students of total academic boycott against the scholars of kalam. Furthermore, Ahmad ibn Hanbal also recorded engaged in long debates against the leading Mu'tazilite and qadi of caliphate, Ahmad ibn Abi Du'ad, regarding the said matter about the nature of Quran. The Hanbali scholars and followers of Ahmad ibn Hanbal rarely mention about kalam in their teaching, as they consider it as bid'ah (innovation), and its practitioners are zanādiqa (heretics). After the longtime persecution of Mihna towards the Ahl a-Hadith since the time of his great-grandfather, caliph al-Mutawakkil changed the caliphate policy by restoring them to favor, while abandoning Mu'tazilites led by Ahmad ibn Abi Du'ad. The caliph also attempted to reconcile with Ahmad ibn Hanbal, and finally, in March 852, he ordered that all prisoners held on account of the inquisition against the Sunnis be released.

=== Early Abbasids ===
According to Al-Shahrastani, the golden age of the science of kalam began with the caliphs Harun al-Rashid (r. 786–809), al-Ma'mun (r. 813–833), al-Mu'tasim (r. 833–842), al-Wathiq (r. 842–847) and al-Mutawakkil (r. 847–861) and ended in the time of Sahib ibn Abbad, who served as vizier of the Buyids of Ray from 979 to 995.

One of the most important promoters of kalam discussions in the early Abbasid period was the Barmakid Yahya ibn Khalid, who served as vizier under Harun al-Rashid. Al-Yaʿqūbī (d. after 905) reports that he loved kalam and discussion (Naẓar), and that in his days the mutakallimūn became numerous and they debated with each other and wrote books. Al-Yaʿqūbī cites Hisham ibn al-Hakam and Dirar ibn Amr (d. 815) as examples of mutakallimīn of this period. According to a report quoted by Ibn Babawayh, Yahya ibn Khalid used to hold a discussion group (maǧlis) at his place on Sundays, in which mutakallimūn from every sect (firqa) and religious community (milla) participated, who then debated with each other about their religions and put forward arguments against each other. This discussion group is also mentioned by al-Masʿūdī . According to his report, many Islamic mutakallimūn participated in this discussion, including Muʿtazilites such as Abu l-Hudhail, Ibrahim al-Nazzam and Bishr ibn al-Muʿtamir, Imamites such as Hisham ibn al-Hakam, one Kharijite and one Murjite each, as well as representatives of other worldviews and faiths, including the Mobed of the Zoroastrians.

The Caliph al-Ma'mun also distinguished himself by promoting the Kalam. Al-Yaʿqūbī reports that he openly professed the "People of Monotheism and Justice" (Ahl al-Tawhid wal 'Adl), that is, the Muʿtazila, attracted Mutakallimūn to his court and paid them maintenance so that their numbers increased. Each one, explains al-Yaʿqūbī, wrote books to defend his own doctrine and to refute his opponents.

Al-Jahiz (d. 869), who wrote one of the first treatises on the kalam, praised the art of the kalam as a "precious jewel" (juhar tamīn), as "the treasure that never perishes" (al-kanz allaḏī lā yafnā wa-lā yablā) and as the "companion who does not bore and does not deceive". It is the standard for every other art, the rein for every expression, the scales with which one can clarify the lack or excess of every thing, and the filter with which one can recognize the purity or impurity of every thing. All scholars depend on it, and it is the tool and model for every acquisition. What could be more important than something without which one cannot prove the glory of God or prophethood, and without which one cannot distinguish the true argument from the false argument and the proof from the false proof. The kalam makes it possible to distinguish the community (jama'a) from the sect (firqa) and the Sunnah from the Bid'ah. Al-Jahiz also compares the kalam to a border fortress, the defence of which requires great personal commitment. It is like a border fortress because all people are hostile towards its followers. Whoever gives this science its due can expect a corresponding reward. [ 85 ] Al-Jāhiz praises the Mutakallimūn for remaining loyal to their discipline out of conviction of its high value, despite the rejection that their discipline experiences in society, and for even being willing to accept the sacrifice of poverty and lack of career opportunities as a Qadi.

In another writing, al-Jahiz stated that without the Kalam, there would be no religion for God and no one would be distinguished from the heretics. There would be no difference between falsehood and truth and no separation between a prophet and a mere pretender to prophethood. Argument could not be distinguished from deceit and proof could not be distinguished from apparent proof. The art of the Kalam was preferable to every other art and education, which is why it was made the standard for all philosophical speculation and the basis of every syllogism. It was only held in such high esteem because every scholar needed it and could not do without it.

=== 10th and 11th centuries: Spread from Iraq to the east and west ===
Until the early 10th century, the Kalam was essentially limited to Iraq and Greater Khorasan. A very important center of the Kalam culture was the Muʿtazilite stronghold of ʿAskar Mukram in Khuzistan, the place of work of Al-Jubba'i and his son Abu Hashim al-Jubba'i. The geographer Ibn Hauqal (d. 977) reports that members of the common people also practiced the Kalam method here and achieved such mastery that they could compete with scholars from other cities. Ibn Hawqal reports in his book Surat Al-Ard that he saw two porters in the city who were carrying heavy loads on their heads or backs and at the same time arguing about the interpretation of the Quran and questions of the Kalam.

During the course of the 10th century, the Kalam also spread more widely to the eastern regions of the Islamic Empire. One of the early Kalam scholars representing the Mu'tazila in Khorasan was Abū al-Qāsim al-Balkhī (d. 931). Other Kalam scholars such as Al-Qadi Abd al-Jabbar (d. 1024) settled in Rayy. In the late 10th century, the two renowned Ash'ari Kalam scholars, Ibn Furak and Abu Ishaq al-Isfarayini (d. 1027) having studied in Baghdad arrived to teach in Khurasan at this time. Some of the prominent Shafi'i families in Nishapur took up the cause of Ash'arism and it became well-established in the city, which developed into the main hub of Shafi'ite learning in the East. Ash'arism swiftly proliferated throughout Iran's other Shafi'ite communities. It developed into the mainstream Shafi'ite ideology in the Islamic world during the Seljuk era.

In the Maghreb and al-Andalus, on the other hand, the Kalam was not yet a topic of discussion until the early 11th century. Al-Baqillani a Maliki jurist contributed to the propagation of Ash'arism within the Maliki circles in North Africa. One of his students, Abu Dharr al-Harawi was the first to introduce the Ash'ari doctrine to the Holy Sanctuary of Mecca. Among the hundreds of Andalusi and Maghrebi pupils that Abu Dharr al-Harawi trained to become jurists and judges, and who helped Ash'arism expand to their home countries are Abu al-Walid al-Baji and Abu Imran al-Fasi. However, research shows that his students were not the first to introduce Ash'arism as there were already known Ash'ari presence in the Tunisia such as Ibn Abi Zayd al-Qayrawani and Abu al-Hassan al-Qabisi. In al-Andalus, Ash'arism was flourishing since the time of the theologian-philosopher Ibn Hazm (d. 1064). The theologian Abu Bakr al-Baqillani's works were widely circulated in the region, which helped fostered the growth of Ash'arite theology and sparked debates. Eventually, Mu'tazilite beliefs in the region were subdued. Shortly after, the Ash'ari theology became the mainstream doctrine of the Maliki school.

The Mu'tazila, also known as the Ahl al-Tawhid wal-'Adl, or the "People of Divine Unity and Justice", were originally the dominant school of kalam, but by the tenth century, two madhabs—the Ash'ariyya and the Maturidiyya—rose in fierce opposition to the Mu'tazila. Each school bore the names of its founders, Abu Hasan al-Ash'ari and Abu Mansur al-Maturidi, and represented Ahl al-Sunnah (People of Prophetic ways). In the tenth and eleventh centuries, the Maturidites flourished in Khurasan and Central Asia, while the Ash'arites posed a threat to Mu'tazila hegemony in central Iraq and Iran. Both schools use kalam to defend what we now refer to as "orthodox Islam" or traditionalist Islamic theological doctrine. Mu'tazalism would eventually fall because of this. This is noted by Western historians, who label the Mu'tazila as a heterodox theological movement and extreme rationalists. The group would continue to exist and primarily follow Shia and Ibadi.

=== Post-classical period and "conservatism" ===
The most influential work of the post-classical Kalām was the Kitāb al-Mawāqif by the Iranian Shafi'i theologian Adud al-Din al-Iji (d. 1355). It received a total of five commentaries and 32 supercommentaries and became part of the Dars al-Nizāmī curriculum in the South Asian madrasas. The book also played an important role in Ottoman schools. The Ottoman scholar Sāčaqlızāde recommended it to scholars in the Kalām section of his encyclopedia Tartīb al-ʿulūm, together with the Kitāb al-Maqāṣid by Saʿd ad-Dīn at-Taftāzānī, as a basis for teaching. The work contains an introductory chapter at the beginning in which the author discusses the definition, subject, utility, rank, problems and naming of the science of Kalām.

At the end of the 14th century, Ibn Khaldun believed that the science of Kalam was no longer necessary for students of his time, because the heretics and innovators had since perished and it was sufficient to study what the Sunni imams had written to defend themselves against them. However, the science of Kalam experienced a revival in the 17th and 18th centuries in what is now Mauritania. A particularly zealous follower of the Kalam was the Ash'arite scholar Muhammad ibn 'Umar al-Bartallī (d. 1696) in Walatah. A West African biography collection reports that he was one of the famous Mutakallimūn and was constantly busy reading, copying and teaching Kalam books. The Kalām was also promoted among the Volga-Ural Tatars in Russia. At the end of the 18th century, it became an integral part of madrasa scholarship in villages and small towns, even if it was limited to commentaries and glosses.

However, the early modern period was a phase of "frozen conservatism" for Kalām science, as Louis Gardet writes. Muslim scholars also diagnosed a decline in this discipline. The Ottoman-Turkish scholar İsmail Hakkı İzmirli (d. 1946), for example, complained that in his time there were very few people who really knew the Kalām problems and understood the Kalām riddles. There is hardly a Kalam scholar who understands more than the Kalam questions of a book, and the science of Kalam is limited to the study of the commentary on the ʿAqāʾid of Najm al-Dīn Abū Hafs an-Nasafī (d. 1142) and on the ʿAqāʾid of ʿAdud al-Dīn al-Īji (d. 1355).

=== Modern attempts at revival ===
Mulla Sadra, 17th AD Twelver Shia philosopher and mystic; has felt that he owed to the Greek philosophy, for the development of kalam as Islamic discourse. Modern philosopher Federico Campagna has suspected the similarity between the unique cosmological kalam philosophy taught by Mulla Sadra with Hindu Vedic Upanishads philosophy. In retrospect, Muhammad Kamal from Islamic studies at the Melbourne institute has stated Mulla Sadra philosophy was influenced by Avicenna and Ibn Arabi.

Ruhollah Khomeini, Iranian Islamic revolutionary, politician, religious leader who served as the first Supreme Leader of Iran, founder of modern-day Islamic Republic of Iran and the main leader of the Iranian Revolution; has used kalam to facilitate his socio-religious revival of moral spirit of the masses. As he formulate the revolutionary system on his states building, Khomeini's political thoughts was closely linked with kalam discourse.

== As an Islamic discipline ==
Although seeking knowledge in Islam is considered a religious obligation, the study of kalam is considered by Muslim scholars to fall beyond the category of necessity and is usually the preserve of qualified scholars, eliciting limited interest from the masses or common people.

The early Muslim scholar al-Shafi'i held that there should be a certain number of men trained in kalam to defend and purify the faith, but that it would be a great evil if their arguments should become known to the mass of the people.

Similarly, the Islamic scholar al-Ghazali held the view that the science of kalam is not a personal duty on Muslims but a collective duty. Like al-Shafi'i, he discouraged the masses from studying it and that only the most able do so.

== Criticism ==
Despite the dominance of kalam as an intellectual tradition within Islam, some scholars were critical of its use. For example, the Hanbali school and the followers of Ahmad Ibn Hanbal would generally avoid kalam and philosophical talk all together, seeing it as an innovation. The modern Wahhabi and Salafi movements generally consider kalam to be an innovation and reject its usage.

The Hanbali Sufi, Khwaja Abdullah Ansari wrote a treatise entitled Dhamm al-Kalam where he criticized the use of kalam.

Ibn Qudama, 13th AD Hanbali scholar; harshly criticized kalam as one of the worst of all heresies. He characterized their scholars, the mutakallimūn, as innovators and heretics who had betrayed and deviated from the simple and pious faith of the early Muslims.

Ibn Taymiyya, 14th AD Hanbali scholar; was notable for his bold stance against the doctrines of Mutakallimin in his works such as ar-Radd 'ala al-mantiqiyyın (Refutation of the Rationalists), and bayan muwafaqat al-'aql al-sarih li al-Naql as-Sahiha. Ibn Taymiyya even further criticize Ash'arite rationalists such as al-Ghazali, Fakhr al-Din al-Razi, and al-Shahrastani for their method in discourses by abandoning the scripturalism way. In general, Ibn Taymiyya has detailed his criticism in Ar-Radd 'ala al-Mantiqiyyin. Regarding al-Ghazali in particular, Through the seventh chapter of his book, Mi'yar Al-'Ilm, Ibn Taymiyyah wrote that although he recognized that al-Ghazali's intention are not inherently bad in his attempt to describe the limit of human's mind in metaphysical and esoterical concepts, as it was aimed to oppose the core idea of kalam scholars that everything must be grasped by logic; although he still held that such discourse are moot as it only distract al-Ghazali from the important aspect of literal meanings, while it kept al-Ghazali busy with irrelevant semantic argumentations.

Al-Shawkani, an 18th AD Atharism, Zahiri scholar, early Salafi movement figure, and Muhammad ibn Abd al-Wahhab contemporary; has expressed his view for literal theological interpretation and opposition to kalam (speculative theology).

Siddiq Hasan Khan, 19th AD North Indian Salafi scholar, co-founder of Ahl-i Hadith movement, and also Nawab (viceroy) of Bhopal State; has rejected kalam as he regards it as "full of speculations". It was stated by himself that his opposition towards kalam were influenced by the thoughts of Al-Shawkani, Al-San'ani and Ibn Taymiyya.

Rashid Rida, 19th century AD reformer of Islamics school; in his later years of life has perceived the Athari theology as more rational than Kalam and actively condemning Kalam, as he view the Athari methodology had stronger religious foundations of Islam. Furthermore, he also saw the Ash'arite theology as ineffective against philosophical doubts.

Al-Albani, prominent figure of Salafism and modern era Hadith scholar; considered kalam doctrine as misguided in the Islamic creed due to their Ta'til methodology, which consequently divesting the Names of God in Islam. Al-Albani stated the notable example was the rejection of kalam scholars of the al-ʿAliyy (Most highest) attribute of God.

Manzoor Elahi, 21st century AD Bangladeshi Salafi scholar and academic; has stated in his book "The Importance of Right Aqeedah in Reforming Society" edited by Abubakar Muhammad Zakaria says about Ilmul Kalam,

The Mutaqallimin called the Aqeedah studies "Ilmul Kalam" and the philosophers called "Al-Falsafa al-Islamiyyah" or Islamic philosophy, "Al-Ilahiyat" and "Metaphysics" (supernaturalism). About the latter names, Dr. Nasser al-Aql and many others say that it is not pure to call the Islamic Aqeedah by these names. Explaining the reason, Muhammad Ibrahim Al Hamad said, "Because the source of Ilmul Kalam is human intellect, which is based on Hindu and Greek philosophy. On the other hand, the main source of Tawheed is revelation. Moreover, Ilmul Kalam includes restlessness, imbalance, ignorance and doubt. That is why the Salaf Saleheen condemned Ilmul Kalam. And Tawheed is based on knowledge, conviction and faith,….. Another reason can be said that the foundation of philosophy is based on assumptions, false beliefs, imaginary thoughts and superstitious ideas". Imam Harawi wrote a 5-volume book called ذم الكلام وأهله and Imam Ghazali wrote a book called تهافت الفلاسفة. Besides, Imam Ibn Taymiyyah and Ibn al-Qayyim, among other Muslim scholars have discussed in detail that 'Ilmul Kalam' and 'Falsafa' do not represent the correct Islamic belief.

Similar sentiment were also stated by ʻUthmān ibn Jumʻah Ḍumayrīyah, an Islamic theology professor of University of Sharjah and Umm al-Qura University; that kalam science inherently contradicts the Islamic creed of Surah Al-Burooj (Quran 85:16) regarding the attribute of God's name as omnipotent (al-Jabbār); which contain the attribute of capability to perform any wills (yurīd). ʻUthmān views that kalam's doctrine omitted such attribute by human's logic only.

== Schools ==
=== Sunni kalam schools ===
- Kullabi
- Ashʿari
- Maturidi
- Athari

=== Shia kalam schools ===
- Twelver (Theology of Twelvers)
- Ismāʿīlī
  - Nizari
  - Musta'li
    - Hafizi
    - Tayyibi

== See also ==
- Istihsan al-Khawd fi 'Ilm al-Kalam
- Al-Fiqh al-Akbar
- Apologetics
- Jewish Kalam
- Kalam cosmological argument
- Logic in Islamic philosophy
- Logos (Christianity)
- Mihna
- Qadr (doctrine)
- Scholasticism
- Tawhid

== Appendix ==
=== References ===
==== Primary sources ====
- Al-Jahiz (1979). Risalah fi Sina'ah al-Kalam. Vol. IV. Cairo. pp. 241–250.
- Al-Farabi (1949). Ihsa al-Ulum. Cairo: Dar al-Fikr al-Arabi. pp. 107–113.
- Abu al-Hassan al-Amiri (1988). Al-Ilam bi-Manaqis al-Islam. Riyadh: Dar al-Asala. pp. 107–113.
- Abu al-Yusr al-Bazdawi (1985). Hans-Peter Linss, Ahmad Higazi as-Saqqa [in German] (ed.). Al-Ilam bi-Manaqis al-Islam. Cairo: Al-Azhar Al-Sharif. p. 66.
- Ibn al-Tilimsani (2010). Nizar Ḥamadi (ed.). Sharḥ Maʿalim Usul al-Din. Vol. 1. Amman: Dar al-Fatḥ. pp. 42–44.
- Adud al-Din al-Iji (1966). "Al-Mawaqif fi 'ilm al-Kalam". The Epistemology of Adudaddin al-Iji. Translated by Josef van Ess. Franz Steiner Verlag. pp. 30–60.
- Al-Taftazani (1998). Salih Musa Sharaf (ed.). Sharh al-Maqasid. Vol. 1. Beirut: Alam al-Kutub. pp. 163–187.
- Al-Taftazani (2014). Salih Musa Sharaf (ed.). Sharh al-Aqaʾid al-Nasafiya. Vol. 1. Beirut: Dar Ihya al-Turat al-Arabi. pp. 22–24.
- Ibn 'Arafa (2014). Nizar al-Hamadi (ed.). Al-Muhtasar al-Kalami. Kuwait: Dar al-Diya. p. 78.
- Ibn Khaldun (2001). Ḫalil Sahada, Suhail Zakkar (ed.). Al-Muqaddima. Vol. 1. Beirut: Dar al-Fikr. pp. 580–591.
- Taşköprüzade (1985). Miftah al-Saʿada wa-Misbah al-Siyada. Vol. 2. Beirut: Dar al-Kotob al-'Ilmiyya. pp. 132–161.
- Abd al-Razzaq Lahiji (2011). Akbar Asad Alizada (ed.). Sawariq al-Ilham fi Sharh Tagrid al-Kalam. Qom: Muʾassasat al-Imam al-Sadiq. pp. 41–73.
- al-Tahānawī (2011). Rafiq al-Agam, Ali Daḥrug (ed.). Kitab Kassaf Istilahat al-Funan wa al-Umm. Vol. 1. Beirut: Maktabat Lubnan. pp. 29–31.
- Morteza Motahhari (1991). Rafiq al-Agam, Ali Daḥrug (ed.). Magmuʿa-i Atar. Vol. 3. Tehran: Intisarat-i Sadra. pp. 57–67.
- Al-Dhahabi (1996). al-Arna'ut, Shu'ayb (ed.). Siyar aʿlām an-nubalāʾ (in Arabic). Beirut: Muʾassasat ar-Risāla.

===== Secondary sources =====
- Brown, Daniel W. (1996). Rethinking tradition in modern Islamic thought. Cambridge University Press. ISBN 0-521-57077-8.
- Bulğen, Mehmet (December 2019). "al-Māturīdī and Atomism" (PDF). ULUM: Journal of Religious Inquiries. 2 (2). Ankara: ULUM İslami İlimler Eğitim ve Araştırma Merkezi: 223–264. doi:10.5281/zenodo.3601654. eISSN 2645-9132. Archived from the original on 27 November 2020.
- Caspar, Robert (1998). A Historical Introduction to Islamic Theology: Muḥammad and the Classical Period. Studi arabo-islamici del PISAI. Vol. 11. Rome: Pontifical Institute of Arab and Islamic Studies. ISBN 978-88-85907-10-2. OCLC 42577199.
- Halverson, Jeffry R. (2010). "The Doctrines of Sunni Theology". Theology and Creed in Sunni Islam: The Muslim Brotherhood, Ash'arism, and Political Sunnism. New York: Palgrave Macmillan. pp. 12–31. doi:10.1057/9780230106581_2. ISBN 978-0-230-10658-1.
- Hinds, M. (1993). "Mihna". In Bosworth, C. E.; van Donzel, E.; Heinrichs, W. P. & Pellat, Ch. (eds.). The Encyclopaedia of Islam, Second Edition. Volume VII: Mif–Naz. Leiden: E. J. Brill. pp. 2–6. ISBN 978-90-04-09419-2.
- Kars, Aydogan (2019). Unsaying God: Negative Theology in Medieval Islam. Oxford and New York: Oxford University Press. doi:10.1093/oso/9780190942458.001.0001. ISBN 978-0-19-094245-8. LCCN 2018048099. OCLC 1147875085.
- Hurvitz, Nimrod (2002). The Formation of Hanbalism: Piety into Power. New York: Routledge. ISBN 0-7007-1507-X.
- Ibn Khallikan, Shams al-Din Abu al-Abbas Ahmad ibn Muhammad (1871). Ibn Khallikan's Biographical Dictionary, Vol. I. Trans. Bn. Mac Guckin de Slane. Paris: Oriental Translation Fund of Great Britain and Ireland.
- Madelung, Wilferd; Schmidtke, Sabine, eds. (2016). "Al-Ṣāḥib Ibn ʿAbbād, Promoter of Rational Theology: Two Muʿtazilī kalām texts from the Cairo Geniza". Al-Ṣāḥib Ibn ʿAbbād Promoter of Rational Theology. Islamic History and Civilization. Vol. 132. Leiden and Boston: Brill Publishers. pp. i–102. doi:10.1163/9789004323735_001. ISBN 978-90-04-32373-5. ISSN 0929-2403. OCLC 952470870.
- Mahdi Tourage, Ovamir Anjum, ed. (2017). American Journal of Islamic Social Sciences. Vol. 34. International Institute of Islamic Thought (IIIT). pp. 13–15.
- Melchert, Christopher (1996). "Religious Policies of the Caliphs from al-Mutawakkil to al-Muqtadir: AH 232-295/AD 847-908". Islamic Law and Society. 3 (3): 316–342. doi:10.1163/1568519962599069. JSTOR 3399413.
- el-Omari, Racha (2016). The Theology of Abū l-Qāsim al-Balkhī/al-Kaʿbī (d. 319/931). Islamic Philosophy, Theology and Science: Texts and Studies. Vol. 99. Leiden and Boston: Brill Publishers. doi:10.1163/9789004259683_001. ISBN 978-90-04-25968-3. ISSN 0169-8729. LCCN 2014034960. OCLC 1041077026.
- Patton, Walter M. (1897). Ahmed ibn Hanbal and the Mihna: A Biography of the Imam Including An Account of the Mohammedan Inquisition Called the Mihna, 218-234. Leiden: E. J. Brill.
- Renard, John, ed. (2014). Islamic Theological Themes: A Primary Source Reader. Berkeley and Oakland: University of California Press. ISBN 978-0-520-28189-9. JSTOR 10.1525/j.ctt6wqbpp. LCCN 2014005897.
- Rudolph, Ulrich (2015). Al-Māturīdī and the Development of Sunnī Theology in Samarqand. Islamic History and Civilization. Vol. 100. Translated by Adem, Rodrigo. Leiden and Boston: Brill Publishers. doi:10.1163/9789004261846_001. ISBN 978-90-04-26184-6. ISSN 0929-2403. LCCN 2014034960. OCLC 900892852.
- Sabra, A. I. (January 2009). "The Simple Ontology of Kalām Atomism: An Outline". Early Science and Medicine. 14 (1-3: Evidence and Interpretation: Studies on Early Science and Medicine in Honor of John E. Murdoch). Leiden and Boston: Brill Publishers: 68–78. doi:10.1163/157338209X425506. ISSN 1573-3823. JSTOR 20617778. PMID 19831225.
- al-Salimi, Abdulrahman, ed. (2021). Early Ibadi Theology: New Material on Rational Thought in Islam from the Pen of al-Fazārī (2nd/8th Century). Islamic History and Civilization. Vol. 182. Leiden and Boston: Brill Publishers. doi:10.1163/9789004459571. ISBN 978-90-04-45957-1. ISSN 0929-2403. OCLC 1256592318. S2CID 243595906.
- Thiele, Jan (December 2018). "Recent Scholarship in the Field of kalām". Studia Islamica. 113 (2). Leiden and Boston: Brill Publishers: 223–243. doi:10.1163/19585705-12341378. hdl:10261/173270. ISSN 1958-5705. S2CID 159335485.
- Turner, John P. (2010). "The End of the Mihna". Oriens. 38: 89–106. doi:10.1163/187783710X536671.
- Yarshater, Ehsan, ed. (1985–2007). The History of al-Ṭabarī (40 vols). SUNY Series in Near Eastern Studies. Albany, New York: State University of New York Press. ISBN 978-0-7914-7249-1.
- Zetterstéen, K. V. & Pellat, Ch. (1960). "Ahmad b. Abi Du'ad". In Gibb, H. A. R.; Kramers, J. H.; Lévi-Provençal, E.; Schacht, J.; Lewis, B. & Pellat, Ch. (eds.). The Encyclopaedia of Islam, Second Edition. Volume I: A–B. Leiden: E. J. Brill. p. 271. OCLC 495469456.
