= Abu Hafs Umar al-Nasafi =

Muslim jurist, theologian and historian (1067–1142)

Abu Hafs 'Umar al-Nasafi أبو حفص عمر النسفي
- Title: Shaykh al-Islām, Najm al-Din (The Star of Religion), Mufti al-Thaqalayn

Personal life
- Born: 1067 CE Nakhshab, Uzbekistan
- Died: 1142 (aged 74–75) Samarqand
- Region: Transoxiana and Samarqand
- Main interest(s): Islamic Jurisprudence, Tafsir, Hadith, Theology (Kalam), History
- Notable work(s): Al-Aqaid al-Nasafiyya, At-Taysir fi at-Tafsir, Tafsir-e Nasafi (in Persian)

Religious life
- Religion: Islam
- Denomination: Sunni Islam
- Jurisprudence: Hanafi
- Creed: Maturidi

Muslim leader
- Influenced by: Abu Hanifa Abu Mansur Maturidi Al-Bazdawi Abu al-Mu'in al-Nasafi Al Karkhi
- Influenced: Burhan al-Din al-Marghinani Al-Taftazani Abu al-Barakat al-Nasafi Hussain Kashefi

Najm ad-Dīn Abū Ḥafṣ 'Umar ibn Muḥammad an-Nasafī (Arabic: نجم الدين أبو حفص عمر بن محمد النسفي; 1067–1142) was a Muslim jurist, theologian, mufassir, muhaddith and historian. A Persian scholar born in present-day Uzbekistan, he wrote mostly in Arabic.

== Works ==
He authored around 100 books in Hanafi jurisprudence, theology, Quran exegesis, Hadith and history.

=== Theology ===
- Al-Aqaid al-Nasafiyya (Arabic: العقائد النسفية) or 'Aqa'id al-Nasafi (Arabic: عقائد النسفي) is his most celebrated work in Kalam, which alongside Al-Fiqh Al-Akbar (Arabic: الفقه الأکبر) of Abu Hanifa and Al-'Aqidah al-Tahawiyya (Arabic: العقيدة الطحاوية) of Abu Ja'far al-Tahawi is one of the three seminal works in Sunni Islamic creed. By the 17th-century, more than fifty commentaries were written on this work, of which the most famous is al-Taftazani's commentary named Sharh 'Aqaid al-Nasafi (Arabic: شرح عقائد النسفي).

Abu Hafs an-Nasafi wrote the Al-'Aqaid as a direct summary of Al-Tamhid le Qawa'id al-Tawhid (Arabic: التمهيد لقواعد التوحيد), the famous book by his own teacher Abu al-Mu'in al-Nasafi.

While a few Arabic sources are sceptical about attributing this work to Abu Hafs an-Nasafi, a recently discovered manuscript of the Persian version of the work confirms the authorship of the work for Abu Hafs al-Nasafi. The Persian version of the work, titled Bayan-e Itiqad-e Ahl-e Sunnat wa Jama'at (Persian: بیان اعتقاد اهل سنت و جماعت), is reported on the authority of Al-Nasafi's most famous student, Burhan al-Din al-Marghinani, the author of Al-Hidayah. Al-Marghinani explains in the preface of the treatise that Abu Hafs a-Nasafi wrote this work in response to a request made by Ahmad Sanjar, the Seljuk ruler and Sultan, when he visited Samarqand in 535 AH or 1140 CE.

Al-Marghinani explains that one of Sultan Sanjar's governors who was the governor of Sistan and was accompanying the Sultan, asked the scholars of Samarqand to write a treatise on the creed of Ahl al-Sunnah so that "no one in Sistan could speak against it". Presumably, Sistan was dominated by the Karramiyya sect who were advocating for anthropomorphism. In response to this request, the scholars of Samarqand asked Abu Hafs al-Nasafi to write the treatise, and they all put their signatures at the end of the document. Among the scholars present at the gathering with Sultan Sanjar was Shaikh al-Islam Abd al-Hameed al-Ismandi al-Samarqandi (the author of the published book titled Tariqah al-Khilaf fi al-Fiqh). Al-Marghinani writes in the preface of the manuscript that he took a copy of the treatise and showed it again to An-Nasafi for a final review.

=== Quranic sciences ===
- Al-Taysir fi al-Tafsir (Arabic: التيسير في التفسير) is his most celebrated work in tafsir, which was published in 15 volumes by Darul Lubab in 2019. The work has been widely cited in other leading tafsir works of the Ottoman period, including in Tafsir Ibn Kamal Pasha of Ibn Kemal, Roh al-Bayan of Ismail Haqqi, and Ruh al-Ma'ani of Mahmud al-Alusi. Among the Persian tafsirs, Kamal al-Din Hussain Wa'ez Kashefi extensively cites Al-Taysir in both of his tafsir works, i.e. Jawaher al-Tafsir and Mawaheb-e 'Aliyya.
- Tafsir-e Nasafi (Persian: تفسیر نسفی) is a Persian translation of the Quran in rhymed prose. It is considered to be the third oldest full translation of the Quran in the Persian language, and the only translation of Quran in rhymed prose.
- Al-Akmal al-Atwal fi Tafsir al-Quran (Arabic: الأکمل الأطول في تفسير القرآن) was a voluminous work in tafsir, written prior to Al-Taysir fi al-Tafsir.
- Risalah fi al-Khata' fi Qira'at al-Qur'an (Arabic: رسالة في الخطأ في قراءة القرآن) or Zillah al-Qari (Arabic: زلة القارئ), was published in 2017 by Dar 'Amar.
- Kitāb mā warada min al-aḫbār fī ḏikr miʿrāǧ al-nabī al-muḫtār wa-fawāʾidihi wa-laṭāʾifihi "the Book of what has been reported in memory of the Ascension of the Chosen Prophet and its benefits and subtleties". It is mentioned in Al-Taysir fi al-Tafsir (vol. 9 p. 366) but no copy is known and no edition has been published.

=== Jurisprudence ===
- Manzumah fi al-Khilafyat (Arabic: منظومة في الخلافيات) is a book in the form of poetry, consisting of 2669 verses, explaining the differences in the views of Abu Hanifa and his students, namely Abu Yusuf, Muhammad al-Shaybani and Zufur, on legal rules, as well as the differences between Abu Hanifa and Al-Shafii and Malik ibn Anas. The book was published in 2010 in Beirut.

Over ten commentaries have been written on this work, the most celebrated one being that of Abu al-Barakat al-Nasafi titled Al-Muasaffa, published in 2020 by Dar al-Noor.

- Hasr al-Masa'il wa Qasr al-Dala'il (Arabic: حصر المسائل وقصر الدلائل) is a commentary on Manzumah fi al-Khilafyat with a detailed exposition of the reasons (adillah) for each legal rule. The book was published by Dar al-Fajr in 2020.
- Tilbah al-Talabah fi al-Istilahat al-Fiqhiyya (Arabic: طلبة الطلبة في الإصطلاحات الفقهية) is a textbook used over centuries in Hanafi schools and has been published multiple times in recent years.
- Manzumah al-Jame' al-Saghir (Arabic: منظومة الجامع الصغير) in which Al-Nasafi turned Muhammad Shaibani's seminal work (Al-Jame' Al-Saghir) into poetry consisting of 81 verses.
- Sharh Madar al-Usul (Arabic: شرحُ مَدارِ الأصول) is a commentary on Al-Karkhi's seminal work in Usul al-Fiqh.

=== Biographical history ===
- Al-Qand fi Zikr 'Ulama'e Samarqand (Arabic: القند في ذکر علماء سمرقند) is a biographical encyclopedia of Transoxiana's Islamic scholars.

== Teachers ==
He studied under prominent scholars such as Fakhr al-Islam al-Bazdawi, Abu al-Yusr al-Bazdawi, and Abu al-Mu'in al-Nasafi.

== Students ==
Burhan al-Din al-Marghinani, the author of Al-Hidayah, was his most famous student.

== See also ==
- List of Ash'aris and Maturidis
