= Al Karkhi =

Abū al-Ḥasan al-Karkhī

Personal life
- Born: 260 AH (874 CE) Karkh, Baghdad, Abbasid Caliphate
- Died: 340 AH (951 CE) Baghdad, Abbasid Caliphate
- Era: Islamic Golden Age
- Region: Abbasid Caliphate (Iraq)
- Main interest(s): Fiqh (Islamic jurisprudence), Kalam (theology)
- Notable idea: Hanafi legal maxims
- Notable work: Usul al-fiqh: Uṣūl al-Karkhī

Religious life
- Religion: Islam
- Denomination: Sunni
- Creed: Hanafi

Muslim leader
- Influenced by: Abu Hanifa
- Influenced: Al-Quduri, Abu Hafs Umar al-Nasafi

Abū al-Ḥasan ʿUbayd Allāh ibn al-Ḥusayn al-Karkhī (Arabic: أبو الحسن الكرخي; 260–340 AH / 874–951 CE) was a prominent 10th-century Islamic jurist and scholar of the Hanafi school during the Islamic Golden Age. He is best known for authoring Usul al-fiqh (commonly called Uṣūl al-Karkhī), the earliest surviving Hanafi treatise on legal theory, which distilled thirty-nine key maxims for Hanafi jurisprudence. His work profoundly influenced later Hanafi scholarship.

== Early life ==
Al-Karkhī was born in Karkh, a district of Baghdad, in 260 AH (874 CE). He grew up in a family connected to Abbasid Caliphate scholarly circles. Early on, he displayed interest in both religious studies and Fiqh.

== Career and scholarship ==
Al-Karkhī studied under prominent scholars of the Hanafi school, including the successors of Abu Hanifa. He authored Usul al-fiqh: Uṣūl al-Karkhī, one of the earliest comprehensive works on Hanafi legal theory. His treatise codified Hanafi legal maxims (qawāʿid fiqhiyya), which served as a framework for Islamic jurisprudence and influenced generations of jurists.

== Notable works ==
- Usul al-fiqh: Uṣūl al-Karkhī – foundational Hanafi legal treatise
- Commentaries on Hadith compilations (mostly lost)

== Influence ==
Al-Karkhī's doctrines shaped later Hanafi jurisprudence. His students and followers, including Al-Quduri and Abu Hafs Umar al-Nasafi, transmitted his legal opinions widely. His principles remain influential in Hanafi seminaries.

== See also ==
- Hanafi
- Islamic Golden Age
- Abbasid Caliphate
- Fiqh
