= Bahshamiyya =

Muʿtazilī school of thought

Bahshamiyya (Arabic: البهشمية, also known as "Ba Hashimiyya") was a Mu'tazili-influenced school of thought, rivaling the school of Abd al-Jabbar ibn Ahmad, based primarily on the earlier teaching of Abu Hashim al-Jubba'i, the son of Abu 'Ali Muhammad al-Jubba'i.

== Borne from Mu'tazila ==
Mu'tazila is a school of rationalist Islamic theology known as Kalam. Early practitioners stressed the supremacy of human reason and free-will (similar to Qadariyya) and went on to develop an epistemology, ontology and psychology which provide a basis for explaining the nature of the world, God, man and religion. According to Mu'tazilis, good and evil are easily reconciled through human reason without esoteric methods.

The Mu'tazila school started in the 8th century; its iterative refinement continued from the late 10th century until mid-11th century CE. Mu'tazila was briefly the official theology of the Abbasid caliphs in the 9th century. The impact of Mu'tazila doctrine continues to be felt in primarily three groups: Shi'a (Ismai'li) Islam, Karaite Judaism, and to a much lesser extent Rabbanite Judaism of the Sephardic Rite and Yemenite rite.

=== Two Schools ===
Babylon - Centers of Ancient scholarship

By the end of the 9th century Mu'tazila had split into two schools:

1. the Baghdad school Ikhshīdiyya - followed modifications by Abu Yaqub Yusuf al-Shahham, who adopted the idea of "acquisition" (kasb, iktisab), applied it only to involuntary human actions, God-being, in their view, in no way the "cause" of free human actions; for al-Jubbai, on the contrary, God retains Supreme Power even over the actions which man performs freely. But, unlike the later Ashari notion, Al-Jubba'i refuses to apply the theory of the kasb to free actions; and he calls man the "creator" (Khalik) of his actions, in the sense that man acts, or his actions proceed from him, with a determination (Qadar) which comes from God. Al-Jubbai had two pupils who later became celebrated 1) his son Abu Hashim and 2) Abu'l-Hasan al-Ash'ari who, after breaking away, was to devote himself to refuting Mu'tazila and to become the "founder" of the so-called school of the Ashariyya. The traditions of the ilm al-kalam take pleasure in recounting the dialogue reputed to have brought Al-Ashari and his teacher into conflict on the subject of the fate of the "three brothers"-one pious, one impious and one who died infans. In this issue was posed the problem of the rational justification of the divine Decree. Al-Jubbai was unable to reply with a coherent answer and al-Ashari left him to start his own school.

2. the Basra School Bahshamiyya - see below

=== Bahshamiyya ascendance ===
The Basra school was led by Abū 'Alī al-Jubbā'ī and his son Abū Hāshim. Students and followers of Abû Hâshim formed a sub-school known as the Bahshamiyya. The most noteworthy practitioners were:

1. Abū 'Alī ibn Khallād

2. Abū 'Abd Allāh al-Basrī

3. Abū Ishāq ibn 'Ayyāsh

Abd al-Jabbār al-Hamadānī, a judge, was a student of Abû 'Abd Allâh and Abû Ishâq and a very prolific author of Mu'tazili doctrine. One of 'Abd al-Jabbâr's own students, Abu'l Husayn al-Basrī, was once thought to establish the last creative school of thought among the Mu'tazila - Husayniyya Mu'tazila.

=== Bahshamiyya Mu'tazila and Judaism ===
In Judaism (Rabbanite and Karaite) Bahshamiyya Mu'tazila was adopted in Sura and Pumbeditha Academies of Babylon, in varying degrees, from the 9th century onwards. Jewish Gaonim composed works which reflected Mu'tazila influence as well as translated many of the Arabic Mu'tazila texts into Hebrew (i.e. Yûsuf al-Basîr's al-Kitâb al-Muhtawî and Kitâb al-Tamyîz). The influence of Bahshamiyya Mu'tazila quickly became central to Jewish religious and intellectual life in the East - slowly migrating across North Africa with the Fatmimids and making it way to al-Andalus. Gaonim who embraced Bahshamiyya Mu'tazila included Samuel ben Hofni Gaon who was familiar with the works of Ibn Khallâd and Abû 'Abd Allâh al-Basrî as well as Saadiah Gaon.

Mu'tazilî doctrines and terminology provided a basis for discussion and polemical exchanges between Jewish and Shi'a scholars. Virtually banned from Sunnî Islam, Mu'tazila doctrine remains an integral part of Islamic intellectual history. The rationalistic approach of Mu'tazila towards reasoned theological issues led to the classification of Mu'tazilîs as freethinkers within Islam who had been deeply influenced by Greek philosophical thought and thus practiced apostasy and heresy. A similar attitude was assumed by Tosafists and Kabbalists towards "Jewish Kalam".

=== Discovery in Yemen ===
In the 1950s a number of manuscripts were discovered in the library of the Great Mosque in Sana'a, Yemen. These contained texts by Abû Hâshim al-Jubbâ'î, the Bahshamiyya; they also included 14 of 20 volumes of the encyclopedic Kitâb al-Mughnî fî abwâb al-tawhîd wa-l-'adl of Abd al-Jabbâr al-Hamadhânî. Further writings by followers of the Bahshamiyya School that were found included Ta'lîq sharh al-usûl al-khamsa, a recension of the Sharh usûl al-khamsa of Abd al-Jabbâr by one of his followers, Mânakdîm, as well as al-Kitâb al-Majmû' fî l-muhît bi-l-taklîf, a recension of Abd al-Jabbâr's al-Kitâb al-Muhît bi-l-taklîf by Ibn Mattawayh. However, no texts prior to Abd al-Jabbâr were discovered; the same applies to rival groups to the Bahshamiyya such as the Ikhshîdiyya, or the school of Baghdad, whose doctrines were to a large extent formulated by Abû l-Qâsim al-Ka'bî al-Balkhî.

In the Yemen discovery, the Bahshamiyya School was erroneously believed to have constituted the last innovative and dynamic school within Mu'tazilism; Wilferd Madelung and Martin MacDermott discovered fragments of Rukn al-Din Mahmud ibn Muhammad al-Malâhimî's Kitâb al-Mu'tamad fî usûl al-dîn. Ibn al-Malâhimî was a follower of Abû'l-Husayn al-Basrî. Examination of Kitâb al-Mu'tamad proves that Abû'l-Husayn al-Basrî]s views differed from those of his teacher Qadi Abd al-Jabbar. Ibn al-Malâhimî's Kitâb al-Mu'tamad was published in 1991; Kitâb al-Fâ'iq fî usûl al-Dīn was recently published.

== Opponents of Bahshamiyya Mu'tazila ==
=== Dhammiyya ===
The Dhammiyya Shia was a Ghulat sect of Shia Islam. The name Dhammiyya was derived from the Arabic word dhamm (to blame). Therefore, the Arabic name Dhammiyya is translated as The Blamers. The "Blamers" was used for Dhammiyya Shia because they believed that:

1. Ali was God, and,

2. Muhammad was his Messenger and Prophet, and,

3. Muhammad was to be blamed because he was sent by Ali to call the people to Ali, but called them to himself instead.

Dhammiyya Shia was one of the sects that was considered derived from the Saba'iyya followers of Abdullah Ibn Saba. The sect was also known as the Ulyaniyya or Alya'iyya, named after Ulyan or Alya ibn Dhira al-Asdi, and appear to have been active around 800 CE.

=== Ikhshîdiyya ===
Baghdadi Mu'tazili who fled Sunni Arabia to Egypt for safety under umbra of Shi'a Fatimid protection.

=== Kafuriyya ===
Indigenous North African Fatimids who were good enough to be recruited and die as soldiers yet excluded from Arab culture and society due to their skin-color.

=== Ka'biyya ===
Ka'biyya trace their name and origin to Abu'l-Qasim al-Ka'bi, a native of Baghdad. He refused to accept that Allah is all-hearing, all-seeing, and denied that Allah imposes his will upon man. According to his teaching, the will of Allah, in relation to the action of His servants, is the commandment to perform the act; therefore Allah's will in relation to Allah's own action is Allah's knowledge and the absence of constraint.

Abu'l-Qasim al-Ka'bi also maintained that the entire universe is a composite whole; that anything that moves is no more than the first layer of the physical bodies; that the human being, even if he were greased with oil and seemed to gliding on a sheet of oil, would not be what was actually in motion, since it would only be the oil that was moving.

== See also ==
- Ash'ari
- Jewish Kalam
- Jahm bin Safwan
- Kalam
- Mihna
- Punishment of the Grave
- Islamic schools and branches

A systematic comparison of the doctrines of the Bahshamiyyites (and Abu l-Husayn), was written between 1141 CE and 1276 CE by Taqî al-Dîn al-Bahrânî. This text illustrates the influence of Abû l-Husayn had on theological reasoning of Imâmî Shî'a from the 12th century forward. The study of Jewish Mu'tazilism (Jewish Kalam) began within the last 150 years with the works of Schreiner and Munk. Schreiner and Munk, however, were not aware of the primary sources to be found among the various Genizah materials. Recent studies of Jewish Mu'tazilism were written by Harry Austryn Wolfson in Repercussions of the Kalam in Jewish Philosophy, and Georges Vajda writings regarding Yûsuf al-Basîr. Sarah Stroumsa published the 'Ishrûn Maqâla of the 9th century Jewish mutakallim David Ibn Marwan al-Mukammas . Abd al-Jabbar harmonized some of the Mu'tazili views with Sunni doctrine on the relation of reason and revelation, and came close to the Shi'ite position on the question of leadership (imama). He is also a significant source of information on ancient Iranian and other monotheistic religions. The Bahshamiyya school of thought held that the likeness of essential attributes entailed likeness of the essences themselves.
