= Husayn Kashifi =

Iranian writer, astronomer and mathematician (1436–1504)

Mawlana Husayn Wa'ez Kashifi مولانا حسین واعظ کاشفی
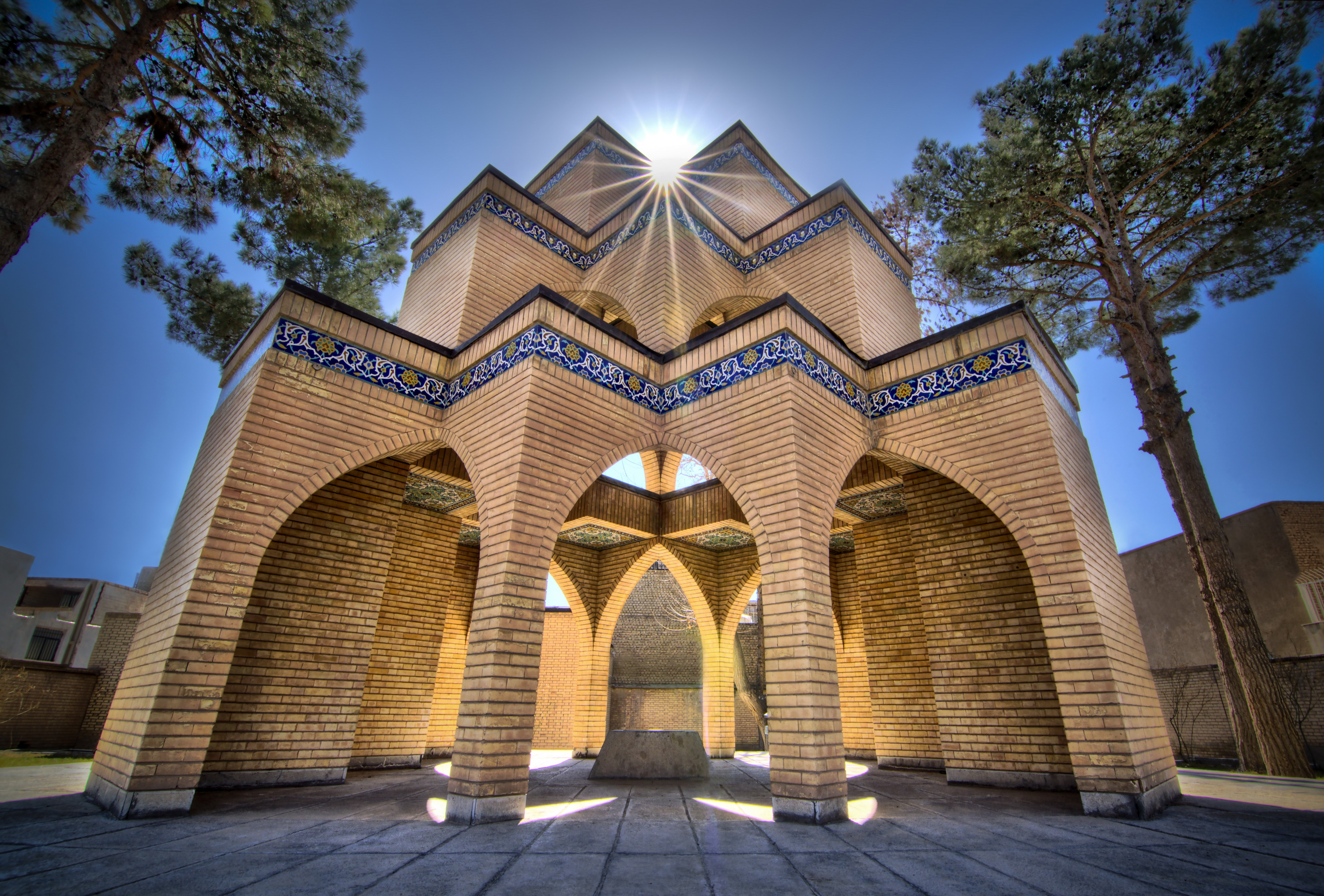
- A memorial in his birthtown, Sabzevar.
- Title: Kamal al-Din

Personal life
- Born: 840 AH = 1436 CE Bayhaq (modern-day Sabzevar, Iran)
- Died: 910 AH = 1504 CE Herat (modern-day Afghanistan)
- Era: Timurid Empire
- Region: Greater Khorasan
- Main interest(s): Tafsir, Persian literature, Sufism, Astronomy
- Notable work(s): Akhlaq-e Mohseni, Anwar-e Sohaili, Jawaher al-Tafsir, Mawaheb-e 'Aliyya
- Occupation: scholar, poet and astronomer

Religious life
- Religion: Islam
- Denomination: Sunni Islam
- Jurisprudence: Hanafi
- Creed: Maturidi

Muslim leader
- Influenced by: Rumi Jami Fakhr al-Din al-Razi Abu Hafs Umar al-Nasafi Sa'd al-Din al-Taftazani Ibn Arabi

Kamāl al-Dīn Ḥusayn ibn ʿAlī Kāshifī, (Note: Also spelled Hussain / Hosayn instead of "Husayn", or Kashefi instead of "Kashifi".) Persian: کمال‌الدین حسین بن علی سبزواری best simply known as Husayn Kashifi, Persian: مولانا حسین واعظ کاشفی was a prolific Persian prose-stylist, a poet, a Quran exegete, a Sufi scholar, and an astronomer of the Timurid era. Kashifi was his pen name, whereas his surname al-Wāʿiẓ ("the preacher") (Note: Also spelled "Wa'ez".) denoted his professional occupation.

He spent most of his career in Herat, where his academic activities were supported by Ali-Shir Nava'i, a senior vizier in the Timurid court during Sultan Husayn Bayqara's rule, hence the reason for Kashifi to dedicate most of his works to Nava'i. He was also very close to the famous Persian poet and Sufi, Nur al-Din 'Abd al-Rahman Jami.

His famous works include Akhlaq-e Mohseni and Anwar-e Sohaili in Persian prose, and Jawaher al-Tafsir and Mawaheb-e 'Aliyya which are Persian tafsirs of the Quran.

== Life ==
Kashifi was born in Sabzevar, a city in the province of Bayhaq. He therefore often calls himself al-Kashifi al-Bayhaqi in some of his books (cf. Jawaher al-Tafsir). "Kashifi" was his pen name (takhallus). He was also known as Mawlānā Wāʿiẓ Kāshifi or simply Mullā Ḥusayn. He moved to Herat in 860/1456, where he got acquainted with Nur al-Din 'Abd al-Rahman Jami, the famous Persian poet of the Timurid era. Through him he was introduced to Ali-Shir Nava'i, a senior official as well as writer and poet in the Timurid court.

Kashifi remained in Herat until his death in 910/1504. He was buried in Herat, in the vicinity of Jami's grave.

== Controversy over his madhhab ==
Over the years, Kashifi has been a source of controversy between the Sunnis and the Shi'as. However, recent consensus both in the Persian and English academic spheres is that Kashifi was Sunni (and Hanafi) in madhhab despite indications of his pious devotion to Shia Imams which is not unusual among pre-Safavid Sunni scholars.

He was occasionally referred to as a Shi'a scholar in some sources for three reasons. First, like many other Sunni scholars of Khorasan up until the end of the Timurid era (for instance, the famous Persian poet and Sufi, Attar Nishapuri, he composed a book in praise of the Ahl al-Bayt who are respected by the Sunnis and Shias alike), Kashifi composed at least two works in praise of the Ahl al-Bayt and some of the Shi'a Imams. Second, his birthplace, Savzevar, was traditionally a Shia center. Third, when the Safavid empire took over Herat, it promoted Kashifi as a Shi'a scholar "in order to justify their adoption of the Rawżat al-šohadāʾ as a quasi-canonical text that served as the standard script used in the performance of the Shiʿite passion play".

In his major tafsir work, Jawaher al-Tafsir, out of around forty tafsirs which he used as reference and which he cites, only three stand out as being Shi'a tafsirs. The remaining sources are Sunni tafsirs.

== Works ==
Around thirty books in prose, poetry, tafsir, astronomy, and Islamic sciences are attributed to Kashifi. The most famous of which are:

- Akhlaq-e Moheseni (Persian: اخلاق محسنی): a treatise on ethics and statecraft in forty chapters, completed in 907/1501-2 and dedicated to Solṭān-Ḥosayn.
- Anwar-e Sohaili (Persian: انوار سهیلی): a prose recension of Abu’l-Maʿāli's popular animal fables, Kalīla wa-Dimna in fourteen chapters, commissioned by and dedicated to the Timurid amir Neẓām-al-Din Sheikh Aḥmad Sohayli.
- Jawaher al-Tafsir le Tohfat al-Amir (Persian: جواهر التفسیر لتحفة الأمیر): A tafsir comprising the first three Surahs of the Quran. Kashifi composed the tafsir using around 40 tafsirs in Arabic and Persian, and around 20 other treatises and books of Islamic scholars, as his reference. Tafsir al-Kabir of Al-Razi and Al-Taysir fi al-Tafsir of Abu Hafs Umar al-Nasafi appear to be the most cited. It is a voluminous work, and when Kashifi noticed that it was taking him too long to finish the book, he abandoned the project when he reached the fourth Surah. Instead he composed an abridged but full tafsir, called Mawaheb-e 'Aliyya.
- Mawaheb-e 'Aliyya (Persian: مواهب علیه): An abridged full tafsir of the Quran. Together with Jawaher al-Tafsir, they have been viewed as popular tafsir works in Afghanistan and the Indian subcontinent over the past five centuries.
- Lobb-e Lobab-e Masnawi (Persian: لب لباب مثنوی): an abridged anthology of selections from the Masnawi of Jalāl al-Din Rumi, compiled in 875/1470-71.
- Rawzat al-Shuhada (Persian: روضة الشهداء): an ʿAlid martyrology in ten chapters and a conclusion, which focuses largely on Imam Ḥosayn and the tragic events at Karbala, composed in 908/1502-3.

== Gallery ==
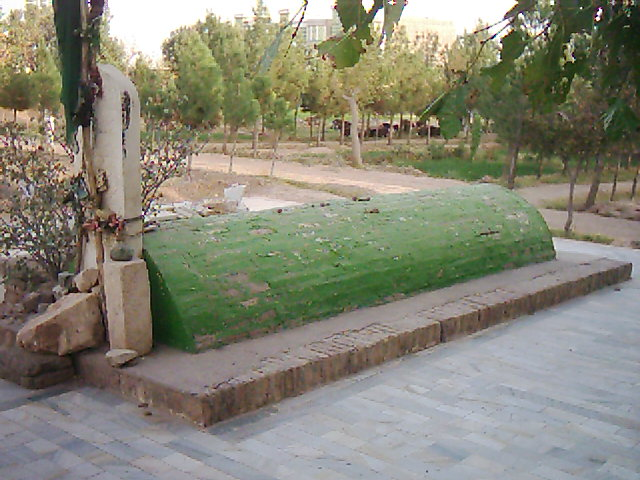
Kashifi's tomb in Herat, Afghanistan.

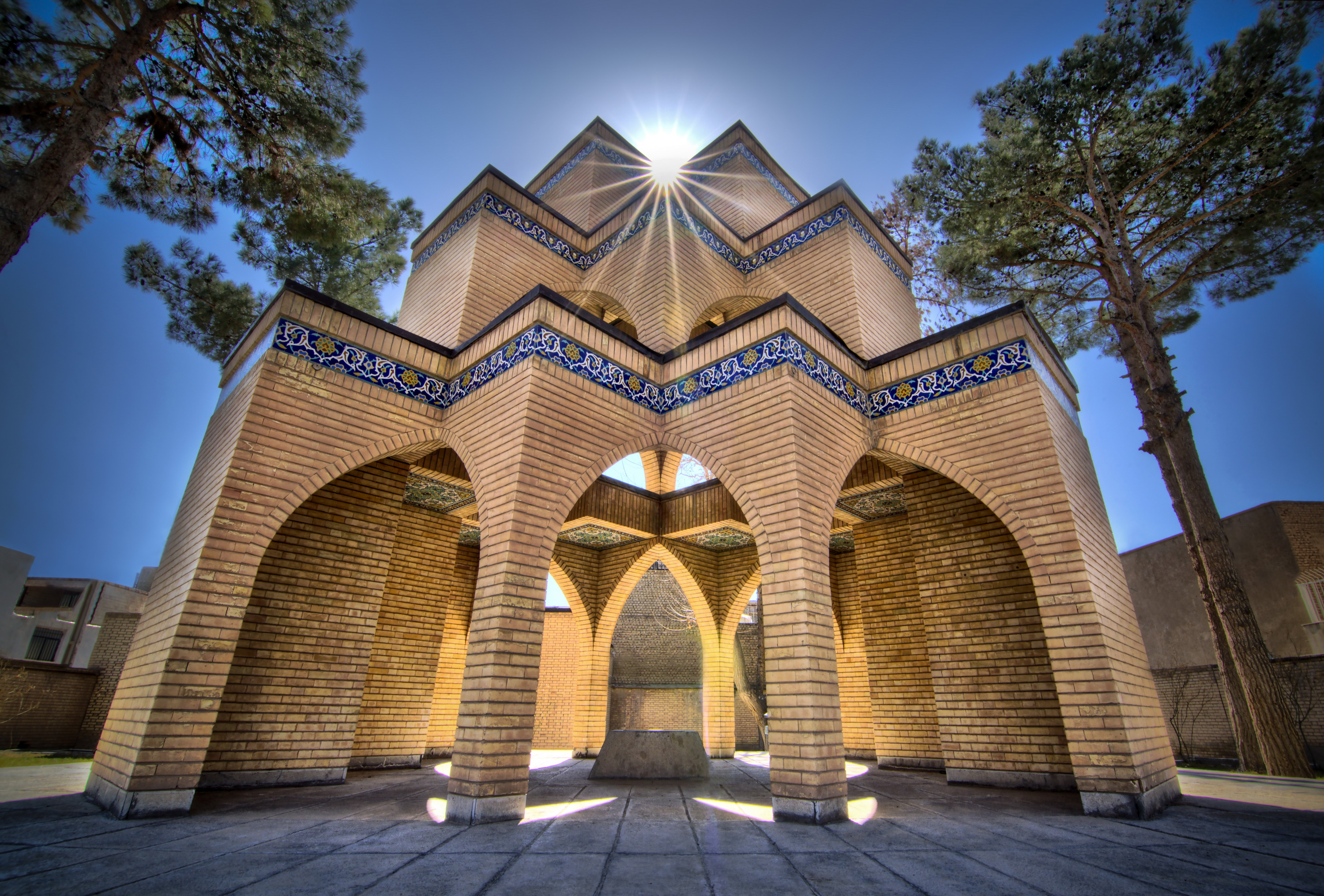
A memorial in his birthtown, Sabzevar, Iran.

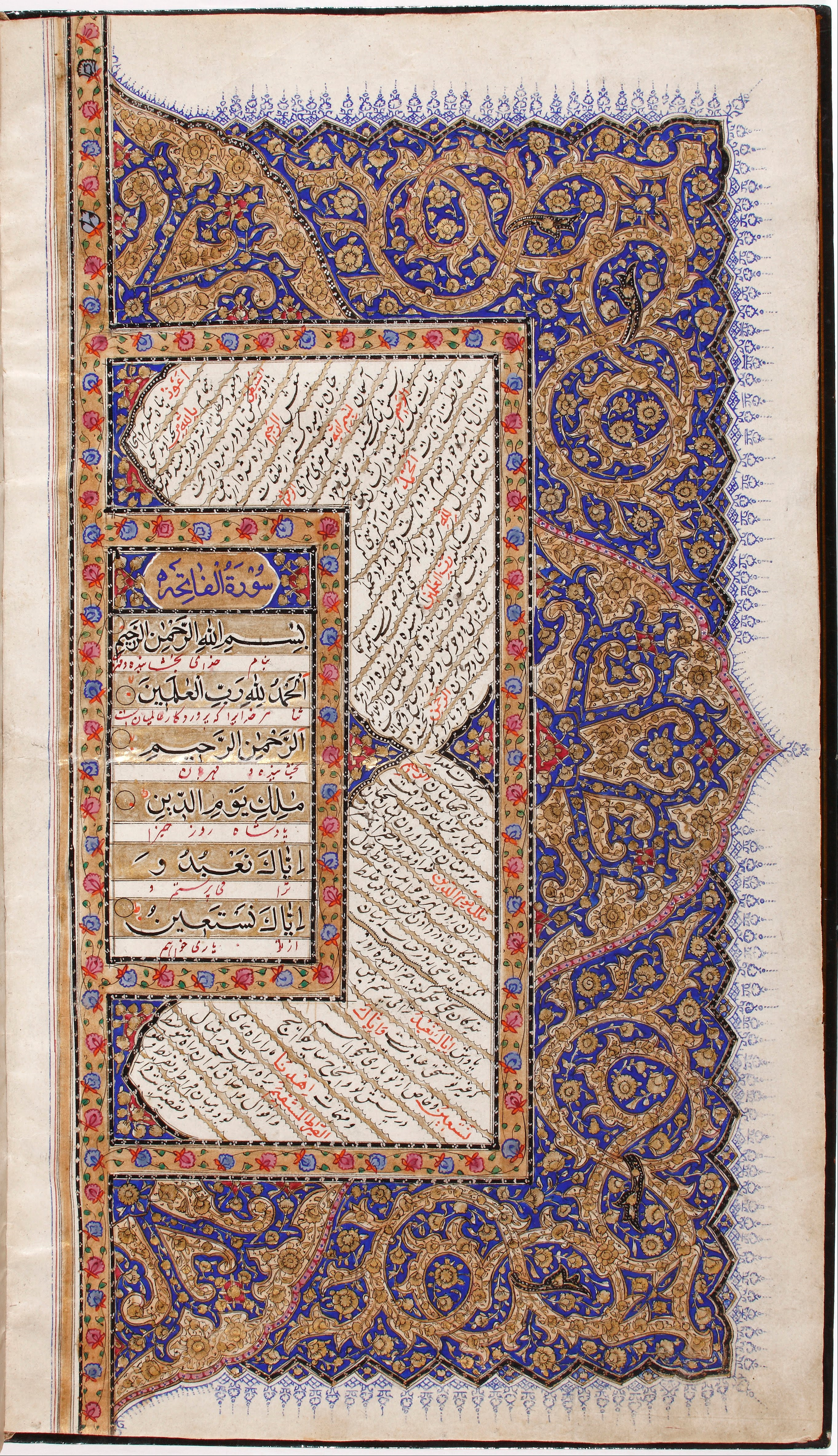
Page from a decorated manuscript of Jawaher al-Tafsir.

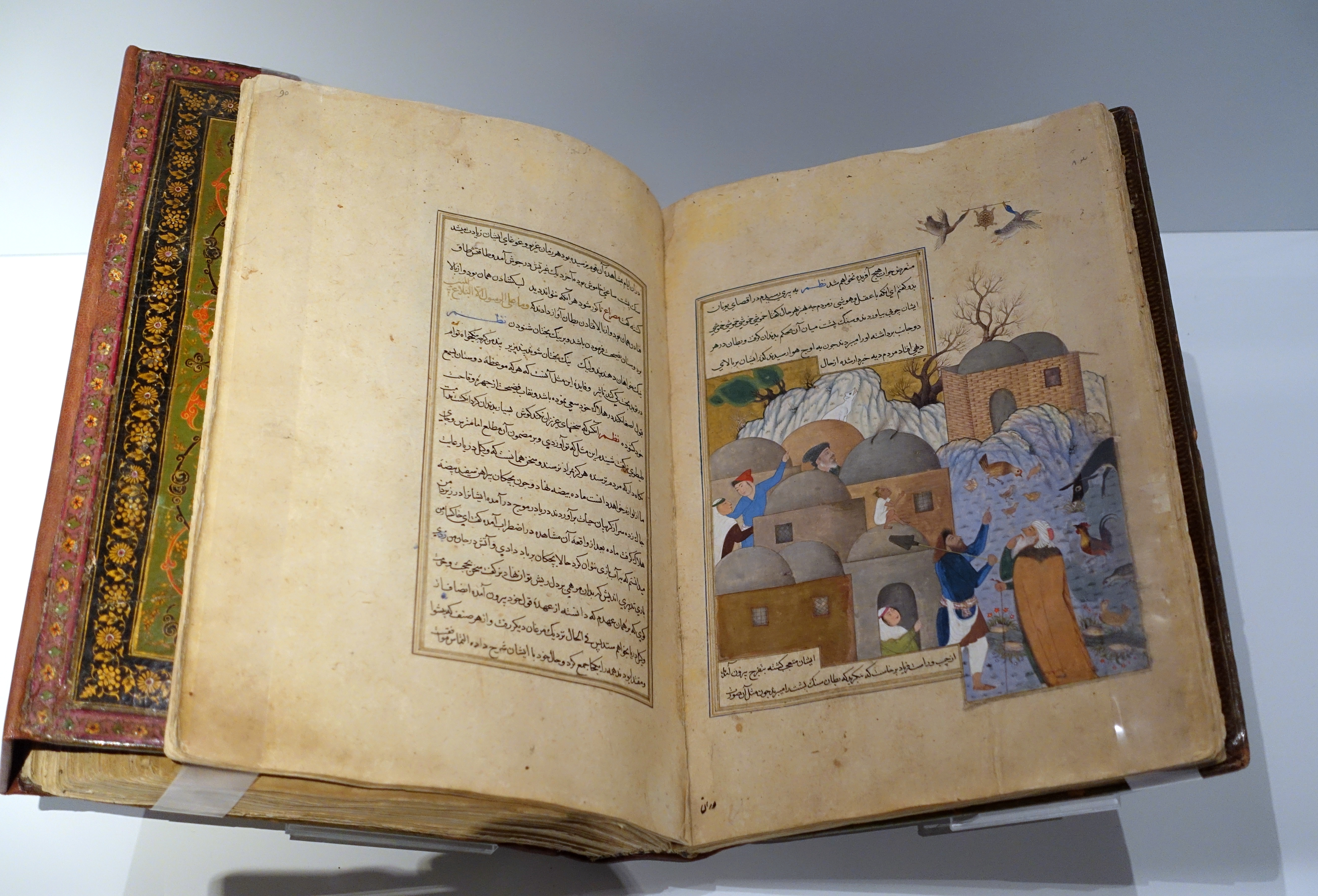
A manuscript of Anwar-e Suhaili on display.

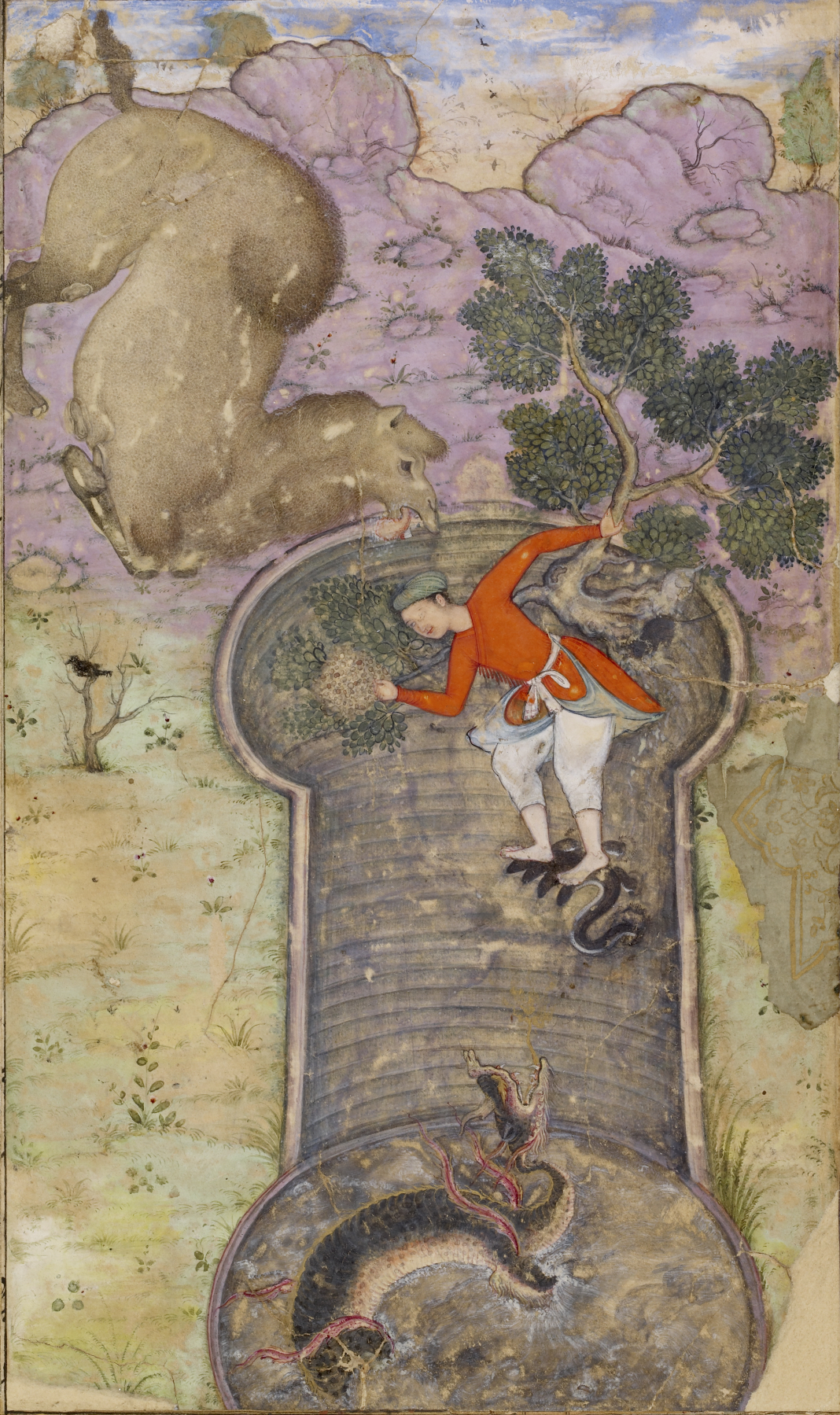
An illustration from Anwar-e Suhaili.

== Sources ==
- Hosein Yousofi, Gholam (1978). "Kās̲h̲ifī". In van Donzel, E.; Lewis, B.; Pellat, Ch. & Bosworth, C. E. (eds.). The Encyclopaedia of Islam, Second Edition. Volume IV: Iran–Kha. Leiden: E. J. Brill. ISBN 978-90-04-05745-6. OCLC 758278456.
