= Al-Bazdawi =

Central Asian Hanafi scholar (c.1010–1089)

Abu al-Hasan al-Bazdawi أبو الحسن البَزدَوي
- Title: Fakhr al-Islam فخر الإسلام

Personal life
- Born: 400 A.H. = c. 1010 A.D. Bazda (40 kilometers from the medieval town of Nasaf, near Bukhara)
- Died: 482 A.H.= 1089 A.D. Samarqand
- Era: Islamic Golden Age
- Region: Transoxiana (Central Asia)
- Main interest(s): Fiqh (Islamic jurisprudence), Usul al-Fiqh
- Notable work(s): Usul al-Bazdawi

Religious life
- Religion: Islam
- Denomination: Sunni
- Jurisprudence: Hanafi
- Creed: Maturidi

Muslim leader
- Influenced by: Abu Hanifa Abu Mansur al-Maturidi Al-Halwani
- Influenced: Abu al-Yusr al-Bazdawi Najm al-Din 'Umar al-Nasafi 'Ala' al-Din al-Bukhari

Abu al-Hasan 'Ali ibn Muhammad al-Bazdawi (Arabic: أبو الحسن علي بن محمد البَزدَوي) (c. 1010-1089 A.D.), known with the honorific title of Fakhr al-Islam (the pride of Islam), was a leading Hanafi scholar in the principles of Islamic jurisprudence. He is author of the acclaimed Kanz al-Wusul ila Ma'refat al-Usul (Arabic: کنز الوصول إلی معرفة الأصول, lit. 'The Treasure of Obtaining in Knowledge of Legal'), popularly known as Usul al-Bazdawi, a seminal work in Hanafi Usul al-Fiqh.

'Abd al-Qadir ibn Abi al-Wafa' al-Qurashi (d. 775/1373) has praised him in his Hanafi biographical dictionary, Al-Jawahir al-Mudiyya fi Tabaqat al-Hanafiyya (Arabic: الجواهر المضية في طبقات الحنفية).

== Works ==
His most famous book is Kanz al-Wusul ila Ma'refat al-Usul (Arabic: کنز الوصول إلی معرفة الأصول), popularly known as Usul al-Bazdawi, which is a seminal book in Hanafi Usul al-Fiqh and was a standard teaching text for centuries.

In this work, he focuses on issues such as rules and methods of determining a variety of sources and methods for making the right decision and discourses on rules of working with texts, and so on. The Uzbek Academy of Sciences has more than a dozen copies of this work.

The book has generated numerous commentaries, the most popular of which being Kashf al-Asrar (Arabic: کشف الأسرار، شرح أصول البزدوي) by 'Abd al-'Aziz al-Bukhari (d. 730/1329).

His other works include:

- Sharh al-Jami' al-Kabeer, and Sharh al-Jami' al-Sagheer (Commentaries on al-Jami' al-Kabeer, and al-Jami' al-Sagheer by Muhammad al-Shaybani).
- Sharh al-Jami' al-Sahih (Commentary on Sahih al-Bukhari).
- Al-Mabsut fi Furu' al-Fiqh (An Extensive Book on Branches of Fiqh).
- Kitab al-Muyassar fi al-Kalam (Elementary Hand-book for Dialectical Theology), a manuscript of which still survives.

He also wrote on Tafsir (Qur'anic exegesis).

== Teachers ==
Al-Bazdawi studied under Shams al-A'imma 'Abd al-'Aziz al-Halwani (d. 456/1064) who was also a teacher to Al-Sarakhsi.

== Students ==
- Sadr al-Islam Abu al-Yusr al-Bazdawi (his younger brother)
- Najm al-Din Abu Hafs Umar al-Nasafi

== See also ==
- List of Hanafis
- List of Ash'aris and Maturidis
