= Ofer Gal =

Historian and philosopher (born 1962)

- Born: 1962 (age 63–64)
- Occupations: Historian, philosopher and author

Academic background
- Education: Tel-Aviv University; University of Pittsburgh

Academic work
- Institutions: University of Sydney

Ofer Gal (born 1962) is an historian, philosopher and author. He is a professor at the University of Sydney.

Gal's research has explored how early modern thinkers reshaped ideas about knowledge, observation, mathematics, the body and the natural world. He is the recipient of the 1996 William James Prize from the American Philosophical Association, the 2010 Selma V. Forkosch Prize and the Silverman Professorship at Tel Aviv University. Moreover, he was a senior fellow of the Dibner Institute, a fellow of the Israel Institute for Advanced Studies, a fellow of the Royal Society of New South Wales (NSW) and a member of the Institute for Advanced Study in Princeton.

== Education ==
Gal earned his B.A. in Humanities in 1988, followed by a M.A. in history and philosophy of Science and Ideas in 1991, both from Tel Aviv University. He went on to complete his Ph.D. in History and Philosophy at the University of Pittsburgh in 1996.

== Career ==
Gal began his career in 1999 as a lecturer at Ben-Gurion University, where he remained until 2003. He joined the University of Sydney as a senior lecturer from 2004 to 2005 and was later appointed associate professor from 2006 to 2014. Since then he has been a full professor. His involvement at the University of Sydney has extended to administrative roles, including his appointment as director of the Unit for History and Philosophy of Science from 2006 to 2011 and director of the Sydney Centre for Foundations of Science from 2013 to 2014, as well as being the founder and co-director of the Sydney Society of Fellows from 2015 to 2021. He was also a visiting professor at the Program for the History of Science at Princeton University in 2012 and the École Normale Supérieure in Paris in 2015. He has been an affiliated scholar of the Max Planck Institute of History of Science.

== Works ==
Gal's work has focused on early modern science and the development of modern scientific thought. His book, Meanest Foundations and Nobler Superstructures: Hooke, Newton, and the Compounding of the Celestiall Motions of the Planetts published in 2005, was an epistemological study of the 17th century creation of the primary challenge of celestial mechanics, which was explaining planetary orbits as "compounds" of motions and forces. Michael Nauenburg critiqued the "puzzling title" of the book, stating that the author "does not explain what relevance it has concerning the main subject of his book". George Smith explained that "The book's title comes from a remark Hooke makes in the preface to his early masterpiece, Micrographia" and called the book "an excellent resource". Niccolò Guicciardini added that it is "based on an extensive reading of published and unpublished works by Hooke and covers a wide range of topics" and that "the pages devoted to horology are particularly original".

Following this, Gal co-edited The Body as Object and Instrument of Knowledge: Embodied Empiricism in Early Modern Science with Charles T. Wolfe in 2010, examining the rise of empirical science in 1660s England from the perspective of the study and the use of the human body. In a review for Early Science and Medicine, Stéphane Schmitt described the volume as "a very valuable tool for every scholar interested in one or another dimension of the history of early modern science", while Ian Stewart noted that it is "intended largely for specialist audiences in the history of science", but regarded its message as "a welcome contribution".

In 2013, Gal collaborated with Raz Chen-Morris to publish Baroque Science, which analyzed seventeenth-century science as a Baroque phenomenon and concentrated on the dilemmas, anxieties and compromises that shaped the New Science. In Isis, José Ramón Marcardia called it a "superb example of analytical dexterity", and writing for Intellectual History Review, John Schuster praised the work as "a total package". Michael Tkacz regarded it as "well-written and accessible", while also observing that there is "something a bit too neat about this history, leaving one to wonder what evidence may have been overlooked". Nicola Davis wrote in The Times Literary Supplement that it is "a fascinating insight ... absorbing ... [and] keenly revealing", while also pointing out that it suffered from "a lack of lucidity". Christoph Lüthy called it a "splendid book, which will undoubtedly be cited for decades to come".

Gal's 2021 book, The Origins of Modern Science: From Antiquity to the Scientific Revolution, was an introduction to the rise of the idea and practices of 'scientific knowledge' from Antiquity to Newton. It explored the history of science as a human endeavor, emphasizing the contingent, cultural and social contexts in which it came to be. Floris Cohen described the explanations as "lengthy, detailed, and somewhat excessively technical". Arpan Banerjee, however, commented that it is an "excellent overview of the early history of science and covers the ideas and personalities of the time in a highly readable format". The book was translated to Korean as 과학혁명의 기원: 고대 그리스 철학부터 뉴턴의 역학까지. Inhye Han (trans.), Seoul: Motivebook Publishing House (2022).

== Awards and honors ==
- 1996 – William James Prize, American Philosophical Association
- 2003 – Senior Fellow, Dibner Institute
- 2007 – Member, Institute for Advanced Study
- 2010 – Selma V. Forkosch Prize, Journal of the History of Ideas
- 2015 – Silverman Professor, Tel Aviv University
- 2021 – Fellow, Israel Institute of Advanced Studies
- 2021 – Fellow, Royal Society of NSW

== Selected books ==
- Gal, Ofer (2002). Meanest Foundations and Nobler Superstructures: Hooke, Newton and the "Compounding of the Celestiall Motions of the Planetts". Springer Netherlands. ISBN 9789048160679.
- Gal, Ofer; Wolfe, Charles, eds. (2010). The Body as Object and Instrument of Knowledge: Embodied Empiricism in Early Modern Science. Springer Verlag. ISBN 9789048136865.
- Gal, Ofer; Chen-Morris, Raz (2013). Baroque Science. The University of Chicago Press. ISBN 9780226923987.
- Gal, Ofer; Zheng, Yi, eds. (2013). Orbits, Routes and Vessels: Motion and Knowledge in the Changing Early Modern World. Springer. ISBN 9789400773837.
- Gal, Ofer; Chen-Morris, Raz, eds. (2013). Science in the Age of Baroque. Springer. ISBN 9789400748071.
- Gal, Ofer (2021). The Origins of Modern Science: From Antiquity to the Scientific Revolution. Cambridge University Press. ISBN 9781316510308.
