= Abu al-Hassan al-Amiri =

Persian theologian and philosopher (died 992)

Abu al-Hassan Muhammad ibn Yusuf al-Amiri (Persian: ابوالحسن محمد بن ابی ذر یوسف عامری نیشابوری, romanized: Abu’l-Ḥasan Muḥammad Ibn Abi Dharr Yūsuf ʻĀmirī Neyshābūrī) (Arabic: أبو الحسن محمد ابن يوسف العامري) (died 992) was a Muslim theologian and philosopher who attempted to reconcile philosophy with religion, and Sufism with conventional Islam. While al-'Amiri believed the revealed truths of Islam were superior to the logical conclusions of philosophy, he argued that the two did not contradict each other. Al-'Amiri consistently sought to find areas of agreement and synthesis between disparate Islamic sects. However, he believed Islam to be morally superior to other religions, specifically Zoroastrianism and Manicheism.

Al-Amiri was the most prominent Muslim philosopher following the tradition of Kindi in Islamic Philosophy. He was a contemporary of Ibn Miskawayh as well as his friend, and lived in the half century between Al-Farabi and Ibn Sina. He was a polymath who wrote on "...logic, physics, psychology, metaphysics, ethics, biology and medicine, different religions, Sufism and interpretation of the Qurʾān, as well as of dreams".

== Life and education ==
Abu'l Hasan Muhammad ibn Yusuf al-'Amiri was born in Nishapur, Khorasan, in modern-day Iran. He began his career studying under Abu Zayd al-Balkhi in Khurasan, before moving to Rey and ultimately Baghdad. It was in Baghdad where he met noted 10th-century intellectuals such as al-Tawhidi and Ibn Miskawayh.

Al 'Amiri retired to Bukhara, where he had access to the Samani library, and died in Nishapur in 992. He believed that philosophy did not contradict the teachings of Islam and tried to focus and base his beliefs on both philosophy and Islam. His views contrasted with other philosophers who believed that philosophy's teachings are very different from Islam's or any other cultures. Al-'Amiri argued that revealed truth must be superior to philosophy. Al-'Amiri believed that the ancient Greeks did not have a final say on philosophy because, as a society, the Greeks lacked a prophet who had a final say in all its forms. Al-'Amiri's sought to defend Islam against forms of philosophy which were regarded as independent of revelation.

== Works ==
- al-I'lam bi manaqib al-Islam (An Exposition on the Merits of Islam)
- Inqadh al-bashar min al jabr wa'l-qadar (Deliverance of Mankind from the Problem of Predestination and Free Will). Here al-'Amiri attempts a resolution of the problem of free will by the application of Aristotelian principles.
- al-Taqrir li-awjuh al-taqdir (The Determination of the Various Aspects of Predestination) al-'Amiri continues to address the problem of free will.
- Kitab al-amad 'ala'l-abad (On the Afterlife).
