= Al-Taftazani =

Persian theologian, literary and philosopher (1322–1390)

- Title: al-ʿAllāmah al-Thānī (The Second Great Scholar)

Personal life
- Born: 1322 Taftazan Khorasan, Iran
- Died: 1390 (aged 67–68) Samarkand
- Region: Sarakhs
- Main interest(s): Linguistics, Theology, Islamic jurisprudence, Rhetoric, Logic
- Notable work(s): Sharh al-'Aqa'id al-Nasafiyya; Sharh al-Maqasid

Religious life
- Religion: Islam
- Denomination: Sunni
- Jurisprudence: Hanafi
- Creed: Ashari

Muslim leader
- Influenced by: Al-Ash'ari Abu Mansur al-Maturidi Abu Hafs Umar al-Nasafi Adud al-Din al-Iji

Sa'ad al-Din Massud b. Fahruddin Omar b. Burhanaddin Abdullah al-Haravi al-Khorasani at-Taftazani al-Hanafi Persian: سعدالدین مسعودبن عمربن عبداللّه هروی خراسانی تفتازانی) also known as Al-Taftazani and Teftazani (1322–1390) was a Muslim Persian polymath.

== Early life and education ==
Al-Taftazani was born in 1322 in Taftazan, Khorasan in Iran, then in the Sarbedaran state. He completed his education in various educational institutions in the cities of Herat, Ghijduvan, Feryumed, Gulistan, Khwarizm, Samarkand and Sarakhs. His most prominent teacher was Adud al-Din al-Iji. He mainly resided in Sarakhs. He was active during the reign of Timur, who noticed him as a promising scientist and supported his scholarship, and was part of his court. Ibn Hajar al-Asqalani famously remarked about him that "science ended with him in the East" and "no one could ever replace him". He died in Samarkand in 1390 and was buried in Sarakhs.

== Career ==
During his lifetime, he wrote treaties on grammar, rhetoric, theology, logic, law and Quran exegesis. His works were used as textbooks for centuries in Ottoman madrasahs and are used in Shia madrasahs to this day. He completed "Sharh-i az-Zanjani" which was his first and one of his most famous works at the age of 16. He also wrote a commentary of the Qur'an in Persian and translated a volume of Sa'adi's poetry from Persian into Turkish. But it was in Arabic that he composed the bulk of his writing.

His treatises, even the commentaries, are "standard books" for students of Islamic theology and his papers have been called a "compendium of the various views regarding the great doctrines of Islam".

== Legacy ==
Ibn Khaldun said of him:

I found in Egypt numerous works on the intellectual sciences composed by the well-known person Sa'd al-Din al-Taftazani, a native of Herat, one of the villages of Khurasan. Some of them are on kalam (speculative theology) and the foundations of fiqh and rhetoric, which show that he had a profound knowledge of these sciences. Their contents demonstrate that he was well versed in the philosophical sciences and far advanced in the rest of the sciences which deal with Reason.

== Works ==
=== Grammar ===
- Sharḥ Taṣrīf al-ʿIzzī (Arabic: شرح تصريف العزي), ca. 738 AH. Taftazani's first work, a commentary on an Arabic morphology primer written by ʿIzz al-Dīn ʿAbd al-Wahhāb b. Ibrāhīm al-Zanjānī (d. after 655/1258). Taftazani brought greater scholarly attention to Zanjani's work, with dozens of commentaries, glosses, and versifications written on both Zanjani's primer and Taftazani's commentary.
- Irshād al-Hādī (Arabic: إرشاد الهادي), ca. 778 AH. A concise work on Arabic grammar modelled after Ibn al-Hajib's al-Kāfiyah.
- al-Niʿam al-Sawābigh fī Sharh al-Nawābigh, a commentary on al-Zamakhshari's al-Kalim al-Nawābigh.

=== Rhetoric ===
- al-Muṭawwal Sharḥ Talkhīṣ al-Miftāḥ (Arabic: المطول شرح تلخيص المفتاح), ca. 747 AH. A long commentary on al-Khaṭīb al-Qazwīnī's (d. 739/1338) Talkhīṣ al-Miftāḥ, itself an abridgement of Siraj al-Din al-Sakaki's Miftāḥ al-ʿUlūm.
- al-Mukhtaṣar Sharḥ Talkhīṣ al-Miftāḥ (Arabic: المختصر شرح تلخيص المفتاح), ca. 756 AH. Better known as Mukhtaṣar al-Maʿānī, this work is an abridgement of Taftazani's earlier written al-Muṭawwal.
- Sharḥ Miftāḥ al-ʿUlūm (Arabic: شرح مفتاح العلوم), ca. 787 AH. A commentary on the third section of al-Sakaki's Miftaḥ al-ʿUlūm, treating the rhetorical subsciences of meaning and elucidation.

=== Logic ===
- Sharḥ al-Risālah al-Shamsiyyah (Arabic: شرح الرسالة الشمسية), ca. 752 AH. Also known as al-Saʿdiyyah, this work is a commentary on Najm al-Din al-Katibi's acclaimed treatise on logic.
- Tahdhīb al-Manṭiq wa-al-Kalām (Arabic: تهذيب المنطق والكلام), ca. 739 AH.

=== Law ===
- at-Talwīḥ fī Kashf al-Haqāʾiq al-Tanqīh (758 AH).
- Ḥāshiyya al-Mukhtaṣar al-Muntahā. (770 AH).
- Miftāḥ al-Fiqh (a.k.a. Al-Miftāḥ). (782 AH).
- Ikhtiṣār al-Sharḥ Talhīs al-Jāmiʿ al-Kabīr. (785 AH).
- Al-Fatāwā al-Hanaffiya. (759 AH). A detailed compilation of his juristical decisions during his juristicaal career.
- Sharḥ al-Farāʾid al-Sirajiyya.

=== Theology ===
- Sharh al-'Aqa'id al-Nasafiyya: This is a commentary on Abu Hafs Umar al-Nasafi's treatise on the creed of Islam. Taftazani's commentary on this work soon became the most acclaimed commentary. By 17th century, there were more than fifty further commentaries that were written on Taftazani's "Sharh 'Aqaid al-Nasafi". He wrote this explanation according to the methodology of the maturidis.
- Sharh al Maqasid. The most advanced comprehensive Ash'ari theology book written until today alongside Sharh al Mawaqif of Al-Sharif al-Jurjani.
- Hashiyye Ala al-Kashshaf. (789 AH). This is an unfinished work of his.
- Al Arbain.
- Sharh ul Hadis ul Erbain en Neveviyye.
- Hashiyat al kashaf (extremely rare work by Taftazani) never finished by the scholar or unknown compiled during his lifetime. There are 3 manuscripts that have shed light on the subject and are known to the public in museums and private collections. One is dated 1147 AH (private Saudi collection and is the oldest dated copy of his work some 357 years after his death), one dated 1209 AH, and one dated 1237 AH.

== See also ==
- List of Ash'aris and Maturidis
- List of Muslim theologians
- List of Iranian scientists and scholars
