= Abu al-Yusr al-Bazdawi =

11th-century Central Asian Hanafi-Maturidi scholar and judge

Abu al-Yusr al-Bazdawi أبو الْيُسر الْبَزْدَوي
- Title: Sadr al-Islam صدر الإسلام

Personal life
- Born: 421 A.H. = c. 1030 A.D.
- Died: 493 A.H. = 1100 A.D. Bukhara
- Era: Islamic Golden Age
- Region: Ma Wara' al-Nahr (the land which lies beyond the river), Transoxiana (Central Asia)
- Main interest(s): Aqidah, Kalam (Islamic theology), Fiqh (Islamic jurisprudence)
- Notable work: Kitab Usul al-Din

Religious life
- Religion: Islam
- Denomination: Sunni
- Jurisprudence: Hanafi
- Creed: Maturidi

Muslim leader
- Influenced by: Abu Hanifa Abu Mansur al-Maturidi Al-Bazdawi
- Influenced: Najm al-Din 'Umar al-Nasafi 'Alla al-Din al-Samarqandi

Abu al-Yusr al-Bazdawi (Arabic: أبو الْيُسر الْبَزْدَوي) (c.1030-c.1100), who was given the honorific title of Sadr al-Islam, was a prominent Central Asian Hanafi-Maturidi scholar and a qadi (judge) in Samarqand in the late eleventh century. He was a teacher to several well-known Hanafi scholars, such as Najm al-Din 'Umar al-Nasafi and 'Ala' al-Din al-Samarqandi (who was a teacher to Al-Kasani).

== Name ==
Abu al-Yusr Muhammad b. Muhammad b. al-Hussein b. 'Abd al-Karim b. Musa b. Mujahid al-Nasafi al-Bazdawi.

The attribution al-Bazdawi indicates that he or his family originated from Bazda or Bazdawa, a small town with a castle on the road between Nasaf and Bukhara.

He was the younger brother of Fakhr al-Islam Abu al-Hassan al-Bazdawi, the author of Kanz al-Wusul, also known as Usul al-Bazdawi.

== Birth ==
He was born around the year 421 A.H. (1030 A.D.) and received his earliest education in Maturidism disciplines from his father. His grandfather Abu Muhammad 'Abd al-Karim b. Musa al-Bazdawi (d. 390 AH/1000–1001 CE), who was a student of al-Maturidi, and his elder brother Fakhr al-Islam 'Ali b. Muhammad al-Bazdawi (d. 482–483 AH/1089–1090 CE) were leading Hanafi scholars and wrote many books.

== Teachers ==
- Shams al-A'imma 'Abd al-'Aziz al-Halwai (d. 456/1064) who was also a teacher to Al-Sarakhsi.
- Fakhr al-Islam al-Bazdawi (d. 482 AH) who was his elder brother.

== Students ==
Some of his well known students were Najm al-Din 'Umar al-Nasafi and 'Ala' al-Din al-Samarqandi (who was a teacher to 'Ala' al-Din al-Kasani).

== Works ==
He was the author of several works on law, including a commentary on the major work of Abu Hanifa, after whom the Hanafi school was named, and a commentary on a work of Abu Hanifa's student Muhammad al-Shaybani, who was one of the founders of the Hanafi school.

The most important of his books which remain is Kitab Usul al-Din (edited with a biographical introduction by Hans-Peter Linss).

Al-Bazdawi's Kitab Usul al-Din, as described by Hans-Peter Linss, comprises:

1. a short review of all literature of the heretics on dogma and theology in Islam;
2. a Hanafi-Sunni orthodoxy defence against the dissenting opinions and teachings of the heretical sects; and
3. a study on the heterodox factions in Islam, their subdivisions and their most important leaders.

Al-Bazdawi was also the author of Ma'rifat al-Hujaj al-Shar'iyya (Arabic: معرفة الحجج الشرعية) in Usul al-Fiqh.

Dr. Haytham Abdul-Hamid Khazna (Arabic: هيثم عبد الحميد خزنة) said in his book Tatawur al-Fikr al-Usuli al-Hanafi (Arabic: تطور الفكر الأصولي الحنفي) that this book should not be attributed to Abu al-Yusr al-Bazdawi, because the books of Tarajim (biographies and bibliographies) didn't mention it, and because the book is weak in style analysis.

== Death ==
After serving for a period of time as a magistrate in Samarqand, he eventually moved to Bukhara and died there in 493 A.H. (1100 A.D.).

== See also ==
- Abu Hanifa
- Abu Mansur al-Maturidi
- Abu al-Mu'in al-Nasafi
- List of Hanafis
- List of Ash'aris and Maturidis
- List of Muslim theologians

Early Islamic scholars

Muhammad, The final Messenger of God (570–632) the Constitution of Medina, taught the Quran, and advised his companions
Abdullah ibn Masud (died 653) taught	Ali (607–661) fourth caliph taught	Aisha, Muhammad's wife and Abu Bakr's daughter taught	Abd Allah ibn Abbas (618–687) taught	Zayd ibn Thabit (610–660) taught	Umar (579–644) second caliph taught	Abu Hurairah (603–681) taught
Alqama ibn Qays (died 681) taught	Husayn ibn Ali (626–680) taught	Qasim ibn Muhammad ibn Abi Bakr (657–725) taught and raised by Aisha	Urwah ibn Zubayr (died 713) taught by Aisha, he then taught	Said ibn al-Musayyib (637–715) taught	Abdullah ibn Umar (614–693) taught	Abd Allah ibn al-Zubayr (624–692) taught by Aisha, he then taught
Ibrahim al-Nakha’i taught	Ali ibn Husayn Zayn al-Abidin (659–712) taught	Hisham ibn Urwah (667–772) taught	Ibn Shihab al-Zuhri (died 741) taught	Salim ibn Abd-Allah ibn Umar taught	Umar ibn Abdul Aziz (682–720) raised and taught by Abdullah ibn Umar
Hammad ibn Abi Sulayman taught	Muhammad al-Baqir (676–733) taught	Farwah bint al-Qasim Jafar's mother
Abu Hanifa (699–767) wrote Al Fiqh Al Akbar and Kitab Al-Athar, jurisprudence followed by Sunni, Sunni Sufi, Barelvi, Deobandi, Zaidiyyah and originally by the Fatimid and taught	Zayd ibn Ali (695–740)	Ja'far bin Muhammad Al-Baqir (702–765) Muhammad and Ali's great great grand son, jurisprudence followed by Shia, he taught	Malik ibn Anas (711–795) wrote Muwatta, jurisprudence from early Medina period now mostly followed by Maliki Sunnis in North Africa, and taught	Al-Waqidi (748–822) wrote history books like Kitab al-Tarikh wa al-Maghazi, student of Malik ibn Anas	Abu Muhammad Abdullah ibn Abdul Hakam (died 829) wrote biographies and history books, student of Malik ibn Anas
Abu Yusuf (729–798) wrote Usul al-fiqh	Muhammad al-Shaybani (749–805)	al-Shafi‘i (767–820) wrote Al-Risala, jurisprudence followed by Shafi'i Sunnis and Sufis, and taught	Ismail ibn Ibrahim	Ali ibn al-Madini (778–849) wrote The Book of Knowledge of the Companions	Ibn Hisham (died 833) wrote early history and As-Sirah an-Nabawiyyah, Muhammad's biography
Isma'il ibn Ja'far (719–775)	Musa al-Kadhim (745–799)	Ahmad ibn Hanbal (780–855) wrote Musnad Ahmad ibn Hanbal jurisprudence followed by Hanbali Sunnis and Sufis	Muhammad al-Bukhari (810–870) wrote Sahih al-Bukhari hadith books	Muslim ibn al-Hajjaj (815–875) wrote Sahih Muslim hadith books	Dawud al-Zahiri (815–883/4) founded the Zahiri school	Muhammad ibn Isa at-Tirmidhi (824–892) wrote Jami` at-Tirmidhi hadith books	Al-Baladhuri (died 892) wrote early history Futuh al-Buldan, Genealogies of the Nobles
Ibn Majah (824–887) wrote Sunan ibn Majah hadith book	Abu Dawood (817–889) wrote Sunan Abu Dawood Hadith Book
Muhammad ibn Ya'qub al-Kulayni (864- 941) wrote Kitab al-Kafi hadith book followed by Twelver Shia	Muhammad ibn Jarir al-Tabari (838–923) wrote History of the Prophets and Kings, Tafsir al-Tabari	Abu al-Hasan al-Ash'ari (874–936) wrote Maqālāt al-islāmīyīn, Kitāb al-luma, Kitāb al-ibāna 'an usūl al-diyāna
Ibn Babawayh (923–991) wrote Man La Yahduruhu al-Faqih jurisprudence followed by Twelver Shia	Sharif Razi (930–977) wrote Nahj al-Balagha followed by Twelver Shia	Nasir al-Din al-Tusi (1201–1274) wrote jurisprudence books followed by Ismaili and Twelver Shia	Al-Ghazali (1058–1111) wrote The Niche for Lights, The Incoherence of the Philosophers, The Alchemy of Happiness on Sufism	Rumi (1207–1273) wrote Masnavi, Diwan-e Shams-e Tabrizi on Sufism
Key: Some of Muhammad's Companions	Key: Taught in Medina	Key: Taught in Iraq	Key: Worked in Syria	Key: Travelled extensively collecting the sayings of Muhammad and compiled books of hadith	Key: Worked in Persia
