= Christoph Lüthy =

Historian of science

Christoph Herbert Lüthy (born Zürich, 1964) is a Swiss-born historian of philosophy and science and professor at Radboud University Nijmegen. His areas of research are the history of early-modern science, the interrelation between philosophy and science, and the development of scientific images and diagrams.

== Career ==
The eldest son of historian Herbert Lüthy, Christoph Lüthy was raised in Basel. He obtained a first-class B.A. hon. with distinction in Philosophy and Modern Languages at Magdalen College, Oxford (1987) as well as a MA and a PhD in the History of Science from Harvard University (1989 and 1995). After postdoctoral postings at the Swiss Institute in Rome and at the Max Planck Institute for the History of Science in Berlin, he moved in 1997 to Radboud University Nijmegen, where he co-founded the Center for the History of Philosophy and Science. Since 1999, he has been editor both of the journal Early Science and Medicine and of the book series Medieval and Early Modern Philosophy and Science. Between 2016 and 2021, he served his university as faculty dean.

In 2013, he was elected to the Netherland Academy of Arts and Sciences. In the same year, he received the Radboud Science Award for his book on David van Goorle. In 2024, he was elected to the Academia Europaea.
