= Jewish Kalam =

Early medieval style of Jewish philosophy

Jewish Kalam was an early medieval style of Jewish philosophy that evolved in response to Kalam in Islam which, in turn, was a reaction against Aristotelianism.

The term "Jewish Kalam" is used by modern historians, but it is not a term by which Jewish thinkers designated themselves. In all likelihood, they were simply known by the Arabic term Mutakallimūn "Kalamists", as referred to by Maimonides and other Jewish writers.

The best known practitioner of Jewish Kalam was Saadia Gaon, and Jewish Kalam represented the philosophical battlefield upon which Saadia attacked the proponents of Karaite Judaism. Maimonides in his The Guide for the Perplexed frequently references and disputes positions of Kalam, both Jewish and Muslim, and in general conveys an opinion of Kalam that is highly uncomplimentary. Judah Halevi also makes reference to Jewish followers of the Kalam but mentions only Karaite Jews.

== Basic principles of Jewish Kalam ==
Some of the basic principles of the Jewish Kalam are as follow. See also Maimonides's characterization of the principles below:

- Observation of the natural world reveals the existence of a Creator
- The world/universe must have been created ex nihilo rather than from preexisting matter
- The Creator is absolutely different from anything in the created world
- The Creator is a perfect unity, with no division

It was also believed (in contrast to Maimonides) that human moral criteria can be applied to God. To say that God is "wise" or "good" is to apply those terms meaningfully, and their meaning is related to the mundane meaning of those terms.

== Maimonides' characterization ==
Maimonides refers repeatedly to the Mutakallimūn (Kalam philosophers) in The Guide for the Perplexed. Some examples of his characterization of Kalamic thought can be found at the end of Book I (Chapters 73–76).

As for that scanty bit of argument [Kalām] regarding the notion of the unity of God and regarding what depends on this notion, which you will find in the writings of some Gaonim and in those of the Qaraites, it should be noted that the subject matter of this argument was taken over by them from the Mutakallimūn of Islam and that this bit is very scanty indeed if compared to what Islam has compiled on this subject. Also it has so happened that Islam first began to take this road owing to a certain sect, namely, the Muʿtazila, from whom our co-religionists took over certain things walking upon the road the Muʿtazila had taken. After a certain time another sect arose in Islam, namely, the Ashʿariyya, among whom other opinions arose. You will not find any of these latter opinions among our co-religionists. This was not because they preferred the first opinion to the second, but because it so happened that they had taken over and adopted the first opinion and considered it a matter proven by demonstration.

— Maimonides

Maimonides continues in that section to provide a history of Kalamic thought, its sources and subsequent development, and then proceeds to condemn a certain laxity of thought to be found in this philosophical school. In particular, Maimonides takes strong issue with the Kalamic proof of God's existence and unity from the Creation of the World in time. While Maimonides himself does regard the world as having been created ex nihilo (rather than being eternally existing, as Aristotle would have it), Maimonides also considers this proposition as being far from obvious, and in all likelihood not susceptible to proof. He thus regards the Kalamic approach as starting from a position of convenience rather than from an irrefutable premise, and their methodology as being entirely tainted by their eagerness to produce certain results which support their prior beliefs.

Additionally he considers their premises to "run counter to the nature of existence that is perceived." He writes that "every one of their premises, with few exceptions, is contradicted by what is perceived of the nature of that which exists, so that doubts come up with regard to them." However, in many cases the Kalamists were indeed more prescient than Maimonides himself in their beliefs regarding the discrete nature of matter, existence of vacuum, and other physical characteristics of the natural world.

=== Principles of Kalam according to Maimonides ===
In Book I Chapter 73, Maimonides presents the 12 premises of the Mutakallimūn, and disputes most of them. The premises are, in brief, as follows:

1. Existence of atoms: The world is composed of small particles which are not divisible, and which have no identifying essential properties (only accidents).
2. Existence of vacuum: There exist certain spaces which are devoid of all substance and material.
3. Time is discrete: Time is made up of fundamental instants which are not themselves subject to further division.
4. Every body is subject to accidents: Any body must have either an accident (non-essential feature) or its opposite. A body cannot be without accidents.
5. These accidents exist in the atom.
6. An atom has one-instant duration: An atom does not persist (its accidents do not persist) more than one moment of time. God must repeatedly create these accidents at each time instant, or they permanently go out of existence.
7. Accidents in bodies also do not persist and must be recreated. This and the previous principle constitute a denial of causality.
8. Only substance and accident exist: Bodies differ only in regard to their accidents.
9. Accidents subsist in a common substratum: An accident cannot subsist in another accident.
10. Any state of affairs which can be imagined is admissible in intellectual argument.
11. All kinds of infinity are impossible.
12. The senses may be in error: The senses should not be trusted in matters of demonstration.

Not all of these principles were elements of the Jewish Kalam as practiced by particular thinkers. For example, atomism was a principle embraced by earlier Karaite Jews but not by the Geonim or later Karaites. Harry Austryn Wolfson, in his study on the Jewish Kalam, considers it doubtful whether any Jewish thinkers ever embraced the denial of causality.

=== Arguments of Kalam according to Maimonides ===
In Book I Chapter 74, Maimonides reproduces the seven methods by which the Mutakallimūn demonstrate that the world is created in time. In Chapter 75, Maimonides reproduces the five methods by which the Mutakallimūn demonstrate the unity of God. In Chapter 76, Maimonides reproduces the three methods by which the Mutakallimūn demonstrate the incorporeality of God. Needless to say, Maimonides finds most of these methods to be philosophically inadequate and naïve.

== Jewish Kalam personalities ==
Among the personalities associated with the Jewish Kalam are the following, many of whom were Karaites:

=== Rabbinites ===
- Saadia Gaon
- Hai ben Sherira
- David ibn Merwan al-Mukkamas
- Samuel ben Hofni

Jewish Kalam was adopted by the Rabbanite academies of Kairouan, Fustat, Lucena, Toledo and Córdoba as the Talmudic academies in Babylonia (Sura, Pumbedita, Basra, and Baghdad) closed and transferred their intellectual and religious heritage to al-Andalus.

=== Karaites ===
- Jacob Qirqisani
- Yefet ben Ali
- Jeshua ben Judah
- Daniel al-Kumisi
- Joseph ben Abraham
- Jeshua ben Judah
- Judah Hadassi

Because the composition of written works was yet uncommon at the time that the Jewish Kalam flourished, there are few surviving books from this era. Instead, what we have are selected quotes and paraphrases such as found in Maimonides and Saadia, but mostly we have what Wolfson calls "mere names," individuals who are identified as prominent Kalamic thinkers but who left no evidence of their work or lives. Wolfson provides a list of some of these "mere names." He also suggests that all the Jewish thinkers of this period were likely referred to as Mutakallimūn, as suggested by references from Moses ibn Ezra and others.

== Legacy of the Kalam ==
Jewish Kalamic thought had influences on many later Jewish philosophers, including Judah Halevi, Joseph ibn Tzaddik, Bahya ibn Paquda, and Maimonides, who criticized it vigorously. Many of the works of the Jewish Kalamists were not translated from Arabic into Mishnaic Hebrew, and so their influence greatly diminished as the Golden Age of Arabic-language Jewish scholarship drew to a close.

== See also ==
- Bahshamiyya

== Bibliography ==
- Pines, Shlomo (1963), Moses Maimonides: The Guide of the Perplexed, Chicago: University of Chicago Press
- Stroumsa, Sarah (2003), "Saadya and Jewish kalam", in Frank, Daniel H.; Leaman, Oliver (eds.), The Cambridge Companion to Medieval Jewish Philosophy, Cambridge: Cambridge University Press, pp. 71–90, ISBN 978-0-521-65207-0
- Wolfson, Harry A. (1967), "The Jewish Kalam", The Jewish Quarterly Review, 57: 544–573, JSTOR 1453517
