= Al-Quduri =

Iraqi Hanafi jurist

Abu al-Hasan Ahmad ibn Muhammad al-Quduri
- ابو الحسن احمد بن محمد القدوري
- Title: Imam of The Hanafis

Personal life
- Born: 362 AH (972/973 CE) Baghdad
- Died: 428 AH (1036/1037 CE) Baghdad
- Era: Islamic golden age
- Main interests: Jurisprudence; Usul al-Fiqh
- Notable work(s): Mukhtasar al-Quduri, Kitab at-Tajrid

Religious life
- Religion: Islam
- Denomination: Sunni
- Jurisprudence: Hanafi

Muslim leader
- Influenced by: Abu Hanifa; Abu Yusuf; Muhammad al-Shaybani; Al-Tahawi; Muhammad b. Yahya al-Jurjani; Al-Jassas; Al Karkhi; Abu Sa’id al Burda’i; Abu Ali al-Daqqaq Musa b. Nasr al-Razi
- Influenced: Al-Khatib al-Baghdadi

Ahmad ibn Muhammad al-Quduri (Arabic: أحمد بن محمد القدوري), full name Abu al-Hasan Ahmad ibn Muhammad ibn Ahmad ibn Ja'far al-Quduri, known commonly as Imam al-Quduri (973–1037/972–1036) was a renowned Iraqi Muslim scholar of the Hanafi school of thought. Although there's no concrete evidence pointing to where his name "Quduri" originated, there are a few opinions regarding the matter. First, that the root letters q-d-r connect to pottery manufacturing and sale. Second, Qudr being a location in Baghdad that his family could have originated from. He is well known for his Mukhtasar al-Quduri, an expository book which is one of the foundations for the Hanafi school's doctrine and jurisprudence.

Imam Quduri was known for his precision, distinction in Islamic jurisprudence (fiqh) and sharp intelligence. He is held to high standard and high regard amongst the officials in Iraq of his time and beyond. His eloquence in speech, sharp insight, mastery of language, and immense knowledge and recitation of the Qur’an is noted by many including Al-Khaṭīb al-Baghdādī who was a student of Imam al-Quduri and even praised his truthfulness in Tārīkh Baghdād which highlights Baghdad's prominent figures.

As head of the Hanafi school in Iraq, Imam al-Quduri's written works as well as his public discussions defending his viewpoints, highlighting strong opinions, and citing direct evidence along with his contemporary S̲h̲āfiʿī Abū Ḥāmid al- Isfarāʾinī contributed greatly to the contributed greatly to the consolidation, intellectual refinement, and public prominence of the Ḥanafī madhhab in Iraq and beyond further into the Islamic world.

While his most known and renowned work is Muk̲h̲k̲h̲taṣar al-Quduri, a concise legal manual highlighting topics ranging from Islamic rituals, spiritual practices, business dealings including contracts, personal status in society, criminal law, and more without sticking to a logical distinct order. It is comparable to the Risāla of al-Ḳayrawānī which could be considered the Maliki equivalent. The book is used as a textbook of Hanafi fiqh taught from the time it was published until today in madrasas, schools, around the world including Qalam Seminary located in Dallas, Texas. Imam al-Quduri also authored various works expanding on various topics including Kitab al-Nikāḥ, Book of Marriage, and his Kitab al-Tad̲j̲rīd which showcases the differences and dives into the points of di of Ḥanafīs and S̲h̲āfiʿīs.

== Biography ==
Al-Quduri was born in Baghdad, Iraq. In his adulthood, he was considered as the leader of the Hanafi school of thought during his time, especially in Iraq. When he died in (362-5 Rad̲j̲aj̲b 428/972-24 April 1037), he was buried in his house on the same day in his house near by to the Hanafi renowned faqih Muhammad ibn Ahmad al-Khwarizmi (Bab Abi Khalaf. b. Muḥammad b. Aḥmad b. D̲j̲aj̲ʿfar b. Ḥamdān al-Bag̲h̲dādī) Among Al-Quduri's most famous students is the historian and scholar, Al-Khatib al-Baghdadi, who narrated hadith from him.

== His works ==
- Mukhtasar al-Quduri
- Kitab at-Tajreed
- Sharh Mukhtasar al-Karkhi
