= Abu Hashim al-Jubba'i =

Personal life
- Born: 888 Basra
- Died: 933 (aged 44–45) Baghdad
- Notable idea(s): Theory of ahwal, Bahshamiyya movement

Religious life
- Religion: Islam
- Denomination: Mu'tazila

Muslim leader
- Influenced by: Abū 'Alī Muḥammad al-Jubbā'ī
- Influenced: Ibn Mattawayh

Abū Hāshīm al-Jubbā'ī was a Mu'tazili theologian. He was born in 888 in Basra, and died in 933 in Baghdad. He was the son of Abū 'Alī Muḥammad al-Jubbā'ī, a prominent Mu'tazila scholar who was also the teacher of Abu al-Hassan al-Ash'ari.

== Biography ==
His main teacher in theology was his own father. After the latter's death in 915, he became the leader of the Mutazilite school of Basra. Around 926, he had to leave for Baghdad because of his poverty. Later his thoughts were known to be associated with the Bahshamiyya movement, a sub-school of Mu'tazilism.

== Doctrine ==
He is known for having introduced the theory of modes (ahwal) into theology. This theory is intended to explain the nature of the divine attributes. It will be taken up by other theologians, not only Mutazilites, but also from the rival Ash'arite school, like Al-Baqillani. Abû 'Alî ibn Khallâd and Abû 'Abdullâh al-Husain ibn 'Alî al-Basrî were his students.
