= Ibn Mattawayh =

Abū Muḥammad al-Ḥasan ibn Aḥmad ibn Mattawayh (fl. 1025) was a Muʿtazilī theologian and philosopher of the Bahshamī school. His dates of birth and death are unknown. He studied in Ray under Qāḍī ʿAbd al-Jabbār, who died in 1025. He is not associated with any place other than Ray. He may be the Muʿtazilī theologian called Sibṭ Mattūya who is mocked in a poem by ʿAbd al-Jabbār's patron, the vizier al-Ṣāḥib ibn ʿAbbād, who died in 995. His datable writings were written not long after ʿAbd al-Jabbār's death.

Ibn Mattawayh's two surviving works are:

- Kitāb al-Majmūʿ fiʾl-muḥīṭ biʾl-taklīf, a paraphrase with commentary and critique of his teacher's Kitāb al-muḥīṭ biʾl-taklīf
- Kitāb al-Tadhkira, a two-volume treatise on philosophy, the first part dealing with accidents, substances and other matters 'physical' and the second part dealing with matters 'biological'

In addition, two lost works by Ibn Mattawayh are known. His Kitāb al-Kifāya, quoted by Ibn Abiʾl-Ḥadīd, argues for the ʿiṣma (impeccability) of ʿAlī and his superiority over Abū Bakr, but stops short of affirming the Shīʿī doctrine of the imāmate. His Kitāb al-Taḥrīr is quoted by Maḥmūd ibn al-Malāḥimī.

There is an anonymous commentary on Ibn Mattawayh's Tadhkira. The surviving manuscript copy indicates that the commentary was completed in 1175. The commentary, which is untitled, is much longer than the original work.

== Bibliography ==
- Madelung, Wilferd (2004). "Ibn Mattawayh". In Bearman, P. J.; Bianquis, Th.; Bosworth, C. E.; van Donzel, E. & Heinrichs, W. P. (eds.). The Encyclopaedia of Islam, Second Edition. Volume XII: Supplement. Leiden: E. J. Brill. p. 393. ISBN 978-90-04-13974-9.
- McDermott, Martin (2013) [1997]. "Ebn Mattawayh, Abū Moḥammad Ḥasan". Encyclopædia Iranica. Vol. VIII, Fasc. 1. p. 39.
- Schmidtke, Sabine (2008). "MS Mahdawi 514: An Anonymous Commentary on Ibn Mattawayh's Kitāb al-Tadhkira". In Anna Akasoy; Wim Raven (eds.). Islamic Thought in the Middle Ages. Brill. pp. 139–162. doi:10.1163/ej.9789004165656.i-711.32.
- Zysow, Aron (2014). "Review of Ibn Mattawayh, al-Tadhkira fī aḥkām al-jawāhir wa-l-aʿrāḍ, ed. Daniel Gimaret (Cairo: IFAO, 2009), 2 vols". Journal of the American Oriental Society. 134 (4): 721–725. JSTOR 10.7817/jameroriesoci.134.4.721.
