= Al-Jubba'i =

Arab philosopher (died c. 915)

- Abu Ali Muhammad Al-Jubba'i
- Died: 915

Religious life
- Religion: Islam
- Denomination: Mu'tazila

Muslim leader
- Influenced by: Wasil ibn Ata, Amr ibn Ubayd, Abu al-Hudhayl al-'Allaf
- Influenced: Abu al-Hasan al-Ash'ari, Abu Hashim Al-Jubba'i, Abu Ali ibn Khallad, Abu Abdullah al-Basri, Abu Ishaq ibn Ayyash

Abū 'Alī Muḥammad al-Jubbā'ī (Arabic: أبو على محمد الجبائي; died c. 915) was an Arab Mu'tazili influenced theologian and philosopher of the 10th century. Born in Khuzistan, he studied in Basra where he trained Abu al-Hasan al-Ash'ari, who went on to found his own theological tradition, and his son Abū Hāshīm al-Jubbā'ī.
