= Early Science and Medicine =

- Discipline: History of science and medicine
- Language: English
- Edited by: Christoph Lüthy

Publication details
- History: 1996-present
- Publisher: Brill Publishers
- Frequency: Bimonthly

Standard abbreviations
- ISO 4: Early Sci. Med.

Indexing
- ISSN: 1383-7427 (print); 1573-3823 (web)

Links
- Journal homepage

Early Science and Medicine is a peer-reviewed academic journal of the history of science and medicine.

The editor-in-chief is Christoph Lüthy of Radboud University, Nijmegen. The journal is published by Brill and indexed in Arts and Humanities Citation Index, Academic Search Complete, PubMed, and Scopus.
