= Abu Hayyan al-Tawhidi =

10th-century Arab Muslim scholar

Ali ibn Mohammed ibn Abbas
- أبو حيان التوحيدي
- Title: Abū Ḥayyān al-Tawḥīdī

Personal life
- Born: 923CE
- Died: 1023CE
- Era: Islamic golden age (4th Islamic century)
- Region: Iraq
- Main interest(s): Literature, and philosophy
- Notable work(s): Al-Imtāʿ wa al-Mu’ānasa (Enjoyment and Conviviality)

Religious life
- Religion: Islam (Shafi'i)

Senior posting
- Influenced by: Al-Jahiz

Abū Ḥayyān al-Tawḥīdī (Arabic: أبو حيان التوحيدي) (923–1023), full name ʿAlī ibn Muḥammad ibn ʿAbbās al-Baghdadi (Arabic: علي بن محمد بن العباس التوحيدي البغدادي), was an Arab intellectual, writer, and philosopher of the 10th century. He is widely regarded as one of the most original and influential thinkers of the Islamic Golden Age. The biographer Yāqūt al-Ḥamawī famously described him as "the philosopher of litterateurs and the litterateur of philosophers." Despite his intellectual stature, al-Tawḥīdī was largely neglected by contemporaneous historians and biographers until Yāqūt documented his life in Muʿjam al-Udabāʾ (معجم الأدباء), relying primarily on al-Tawḥīdī's own autobiographical writings.

== Life ==
The exact details of al-Tawḥīdī's birth and death remain uncertain. According to Tārīkh-i Sistān, he was born in 923 CE in either Baghdad or the region of Fars. A biographical study by Dr. Abd al-Razzaq Muhyi al-Din concludes that al-Tawḥīdī was born in Baghdad and was of Arab descent. This lineage is supported by textual evidence from Al-Risala al-Baghdadiyya, which traces his roots to the Yamani Azd tribe and documents Baghdad as his native city. He experienced a difficult and impoverished upbringing, reportedly raised by an uncle who treated him harshly. His nisbah, "al-Tawḥīdī," is believed to derive from his family's trade in a type of dates known as tawḥīd.

Al-Tawḥīdī pursued a comprehensive education and later worked as a scribe in various administrative and scholarly roles across the Islamic world. His most significant employment was under the vizier Ibn Saʿdān, whom he served from 980 until the latter's execution in 985. During this period, he was associated with a notable intellectual circle led by the philosopher Abū Sulaymān al-Manṭiqī al-Siǰistānī. Most information about this circle comes from al-Tawḥīdī's own writings.

Following the downfall of Ibn Saʿdān, al-Tawḥīdī appears to have struggled financially and lacked stable patronage. He spent the final two decades of his life in poverty, although he continued writing prolifically. He was known to be alive in 1009 CE and is believed to have died in Shiraz around 1023 CE.

== Works ==
Al-Tawḥīdī was deeply self-critical and reportedly burned many of his own writings toward the end of his life. Nonetheless, a number of his works survive and are celebrated for their literary elegance, philosophical depth, and insight into the intellectual life of his time. His writings span adab (belles-lettres), ethics, theology, and sufism, and are considered significant contributions to Arabic literature.

Major works include:

- Al-Baṣā’ir wa al-Dhakhā’ir (Insights and Treasures) – A compendium of philosophical and ethical reflections.
- Al-Hawāmil wa al-Shawāmil (Questions and Answers) – A dialogic work composed with Abū ʿAlī Miskawayh, consisting of philosophical exchanges.
- Al-Imtāʿwa al-Mu’ānasa (The Book of Enjoyment and Bonhomie) – A collection of anecdotes and dialogues, offering rich insights into contemporary thought and culture. It includes a chapter on zoology, possibly influenced by Timotheus of Gaza’s treatise on animals.
- Al-Muqābasāt (Borrowings) – A series of intellectual discussions on diverse topics.
- Al-Sadaqa wa al-Ṣadīq (On Friendship and the Friend) – A treatise exploring the ethics and nature of friendship.
- Al-Ishārāt al-Ilāhiyya (Divine Indications) – A theological and mystical treatise.
- Mathālib al-Wazīrayn (The Vices of the Two Viziers) – A political commentary criticizing the rivalry and corruption of two contemporary viziers.

Despite his complex legacy, al-Tawḥīdī's works continue to be studied for their philosophical richness and literary merit, reflecting the intellectual dynamism of the 10th-century Islamic world.

== Intellectual views ==
Al-Tawḥīdī documented the intellectual and cultural debates of the 10th century, particularly the controversies surrounding the Shu'ubiyya movement. In his work Al-Imtāʿ wa al-Mu’ānasa, he recorded the arguments of anti-Shu'ubi scholars against proponents of Persian cultural supremacy. He cited the debates of figures like Abu Hamid al-Marwarrudhi and Abu Dawud al-Ansari, who criticized historical Persian practices such as consanguineous marriage, contrasting them with the pre-Islamic Arab custom of exogamy.

Furthermore, al-Tawḥīdī directly challenged claims made by Shu'ubi figures—such as the Samanid vizier Al-Jayhani—that Arabs lacked contributions to empirical sciences. He countered this by attributing the historical foundations of specific empirical sciences to Greek, rather than Persian, origins.

== Legacy ==
During his lifetime, al-Tawḥīdī was largely ignored by contemporaneous biographers and struggled with severe poverty and lack of stable patronage. In his later years, frustrated by his public marginalization, he reportedly burned his own books and manuscripts.

His biographical details and literary works were primarily preserved by the 13th-century scholar Yaqut al-Hamawi, who compiled al-Tawḥīdī's life extensively in Mu'jam al-Udaba. Yaqut highly praised his intellectual and literary command, designating him "the philosopher of litterateurs and the litterateur of philosophers" (faylasūf al-udabāʾ wa adīb al-falāsifa).
