= Umm al-Barahin =

Islamic theological treatise

A Refined Explanation of the Sanusi Creed: The Foundational Proofs
- Authors: Muhammad ibn Yusuf al-Sanusi, Sa'id Foudah
- Original title: تهذيب شرح السنوسية (أم البراهين – العقيدة الصغرى)
- Translator: Suraqah Abdul Aziz
- Language: Arabic, English
- Subject: 'Aqida (Islamic creed or faith), Tawhid (Islamic concept of monotheism, the absolute oneness and uniqueness of God), Kalam (Islamic rational or dialectic theology), Usul al-Din (Principles of the Religion)
- Genre: Creed primer
- Publisher: Sunni Publications
- Publication date: 1998 (First edition in Arabic)
- Publication place: Rotterdam, Netherlands
- English publication date: 2013
- Pages: 224
- ISBN: 9789079294275
- OCLC: 900183703
- Original text: تهذيب شرح السنوسية (أم البراهين – العقيدة الصغرى) online
- Website: https://sunnipubs.com/products/the-sanusi-creed

Umm al-Barahin (Arabic: أم البراهين, lit. 'The Mother of Proofs, or The Foundational Proofs'), also known as al-'Aqida al-Sanusiyya al-Sughra (Arabic: العقيدة السنوسية الصغرى, lit. 'The Succinct Sanusi Creed') is a short, systematic methodological treatise on the Ash'ari theology that systematizes the essentials of Sunni belief and their rational justifications. (Note: Ash'arism, or Ash'ari theology, is one of the two primary Sunni rationalist schools of Islamic theology, along with Maturidism. Some notable Ash'ari scholars include al-Baqillani, al-Baji, al-Bayhaqi, al-Isfarayini, al-Qushayri, al-Juwayni, al-Ghazali, al-Mazari, al-Shahristani, al-Razi, al-Rafi'i, al-Āmidi, al-'Iji, al-Jurjani, al-Dawwani, al-Qurtubi, al-Qarafi, al-Baydawi, al-Subki, al-Mundhiri, al-Zarkashi, al-Haythami, and al-Qastallani.) It was authored by the Maghribian (Note: The term "Maghribian" or "Maghrebi" here refers to scholars from the historical region of the Maghreb (Northwest Africa), not exclusively the modern-day Kingdom of Morocco.) Maliki scholar, Muhammad ibn Yusuf al-Sanusi (d. 895/1490). (Note: Al-Sanusi wrote several works on Islamic theology, taught at different levels of learning and so titled. The most advanced is titled al-Kubra, followed by the intermediary, al-Wusta, then the elementary, al-Sughra, then Sughra al-Sughra, then Sughra Sughra al-Sughra known as al-Hafida (i.e., the Granddaughter). These treatises were taught in colleges in the Maghreb as well as in Egypt, Sudan and Mecca.) The work aims to provide a definitive, evidence-based foundation for Islamic creed ('aqidah). Despite its brevity, it's packed with dense theological concepts and has been a core text in Islamic seminaries across the Muslim world for centuries to the present time. Its name, "The Mother of Proofs," stems from its role as the foundational source and most comprehensive collection of rational proofs in Islamic creed.

The work is considered an abridgment of both al-'Aqida al-Wusta (the Middle Creed) and al-'Aqida al-Kubra (the Major Creed) by al-Sanusi. It contains the core tenets found in other major theological works, both long and short. Al-Sanusi explained the creed in a simple manner to make it easily memorized and understood by ordinary students. Due to its clarity and comprehensiveness, the text was adopted as official doctrine across the Malay Peninsula. However, Syed Dawilah says that "though the work of Umm al-Barahin is small in size, the arguments it presents before the reader are far-reaching and highly philosophical."

In his commentary on Umm al-Barahin, al-Sanusi establishes a central feature of the work: the systematic and logical refutation of philosophical and theological groups that deviated from the mainstream Sunni creed. The commentary is structured around positive proof for Sunni beliefs, but each proof inherently serves as a rebuttal to opposing views. His primary targets were:

- The Anthropomorphists (those who ascribe human characteristics to God): He vehemently opposed any interpretation of divine attributes that implied corporeality, direction, or physical location for God. He used rational proofs to affirm that God exists without a place and is not subject to human characteristics.
- The Mu'tazilis (an extreme rationalist theological school): He extensively refuted their core tenets, such as: denying God's eternal attributes (like Knowledge, Power, Will); and their doctrine of Khalq al-Qur'an (the createdness of the Qur'an). For al-Sanusi, affirming these attributes as real and eternal was paramount to upholding divine transcendence and speech.
- The Philosophers (particularly naturalists and Brahmins): He refuted their metaphysical concepts, such as the belief in the world's pre-eternity (qidam al-'alam), a view that directly contradicted the theological doctrines of creation ex nihilo, the divine will and volition, the origination of the world (huduth al-'alam), and the perfection of its design—which constitutes the primary basis for its evidence of a Wise Maker (al-Sani' al-Hakim).

The influence of Umm al-Barahin extended far beyond the Arabic-speaking world. In West Africa, it became the most respected creed among Fulani scholars, who translated it into Fulfulde and considered its memorization essential. Its reach also extended to Southeast Asia, where it was translated into Malay-Jawi script multiple times and formed the basis for the "Sifat Dua Puluh" (Twenty Attributes) doctrine prevalent in the region. Furthermore, it was translated early into European languages, including German (1848), French (1896), Italian (1901), and English (1930), attracting significant academic interest.

== Author ==
Abu 'Abd Allah Muhammad ibn Yusuf al-Sanusi (832 - 895 A.H. / 1428 - 1490 C.E.) was a prominent North African polymath from what is now Algeria. He was a Maliki jurist, Ash'ari theologian, and Sufi scholar and mystic, best known for his foundational contributions to Islamic creed ('aqīdah) and theology (kalām), with his works being highly regarded in Sunni Islam, particularly within the Ash'ari tradition.

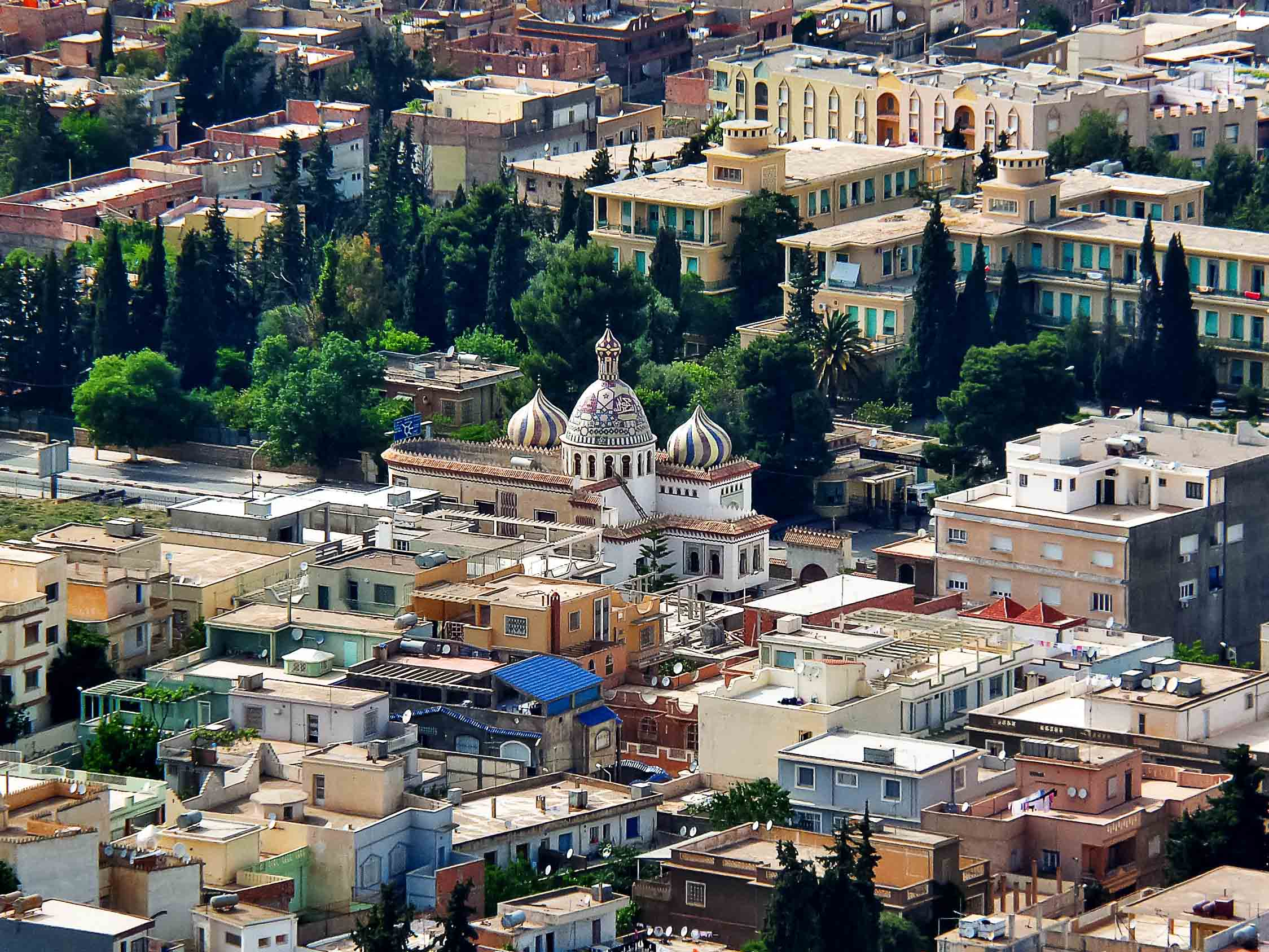
Tlemcen: The birthplace and lifelong home of al-Sanusi

A Javanese transcription of al-Sanusi's gloss on his own primer, Umm al-Barahin, describes the author as "the glory of the sainted muhaqqiqin (researchers)". This description aligns with the assessment of scholars such as the Egyptian professor Ibrahim Madkur, who considered al-Sanusi the most important North African Ash'ari scholar after Ibn Tumart. Madkur notes that al-Sanusi was influenced by al-Ash'ari, al-Baqillani, and al-Juwayni. As a result, al-Sanusi's own work combines the ideas of these earlier thinkers.

Regarding al-Sanusi's personality and scholarly excellence, the Egyptian scholar Ahmad Muhammad al-Suhaymi describes him as follows:

His excellent scholarship in all the sciences made him to be acknowledged by his master. It happened that he was kept far away from the public to save him from envy until he was thirty. There is nothing comparable on the earth to his work in knowing Allah by sound proofs and on the basis of the Sunnah and Qur'an. His treatise was read by the masters every Friday.

== Content and structure ==
The work primarily deals with the core tenets of Islamic belief, particularly focusing on the existence of God (Allah), His oneness and His attributes, prophethood, and other core tenets. The creed follows a balanced methodology, integrating both religious texts and rational proofs. The text is concise but dense, structured in a logical manner with premises and conclusions, making it a key text in traditional Islamic learning curricula, especially in North and West Africa. It's considered a gateway to deeper theological studies, often followed by more advanced commentaries.

=== Epistemology and logical foundations ===
Al-Sanusi organizes rational judgments (Note: The Qur'an promotes the use of reason and rational thinking within a scientific mindset, encouraging reflection and stating that true faith is strengthened by intellectual understanding (Q. 2:164; 3:190; 39:21; 13:3; 30:21; 45:13; 5:100; 22:46; 53:28). Islam also blames those people who do not employ their intellectual faculties of thinking, reasoning, and meditating (Q. 7:179; 8:22; 2:171). In addition, the Qur'an condemns those who follow the traditions of their forefathers blindly, without any critical reflection and logical reasoning (Q. 2:170; 5:104; 31:21; 43:20-24). Furthermore, the Qur'an describes what will happen on the Day of Judgment to those who refused to believe in God: "And they will (regretfully) say: ‘If only we had listened or reasoned/pondered, we would not (now) be among the companions of the Blaze Fire.’" (Q. 67:10). Islam thus makes the function of thinking an Islamic duty. The Qur'an also frequently praises wisdom (Hikmah), and highlights its significance (Q. 62:2; 2:269; 16:125). Moreover, Islam has made sanity (soundness of the mind) as a condition for the validity of acts of worship, because mind is the basis of commissioning in Islam. Accordingly, the insane person is not accountable or responsible for their actions until they regain their sanity.) into three categories:

1. Necessary (Wajib): That whose non-existence (negation) is not rationally conceivable.
2. Impossible (Mustahil): That whose existence (affirmation) is not rationally conceivable.
3. Possible (Ja'iz): That whose existence (affirmation) and non-existence (negation) are equally rationally conceivable.

The opening lines of the text, whereas al-Sanusi defines the three basic logical categories of his argument, go as follows:

Know that rational judgement is confined to three parts: necessity, impossibility, and possibility. The necessary is that of which non-existence is not conceived in the reason. (Note: The meaning of ‘non-existence’ ('adam) here is ‘negation’ (nafi).) The impossible is that of which existence is not conceived in the reason. The possible is that of which existence and non-existence are both acceptable in the reason.

=== Existence of God ===
The text begins by establishing that for every created thing that comes into existence, there must be a pre-existent cause. This logical chain ultimately points to a single, uncaused cause—God (Allah).

Al-Sanusi's argument synthesizes empirical observation—noting the changeability of accidents (a'rād)—with rational deduction, applying principles like concomitance and preponderance (tarjīh) to demonstrate that the universe is contingent and temporally originated (hādith). (Note: This argument employs the principle of concomitance—whatever is inherent to a temporal effect must itself be temporal. Its logic is thus: all physical bodies are, by nature, never in a state of neutrality; they must always exist in a state of either motion or rest. However, both motion and rest are transient attributes with a definite beginning. Since a body cannot exist independently of these attributes—and since the attributes themselves are not eternal but had a beginning—it follows necessarily that the bodies possessing them must also have had a beginning.) This contingency necessarily entails a volitional, necessary creator. (Note: In simple terms, "contingent" means "dependent" or "not necessary." Therefore, a contingent being is something whose existence is not necessary (unlike God), nor is its non-existence necessary (unlike logical impossibilities, like a square circle). It is something that could either exist or not exist, meaning its nature does not dictate its existence or its non-existence. It needs an external cause (a reason) to bring it from a state of mere possibility into actual existence. In the text's argument the entire universe is described as contingent. Before it existed, it was equally possible for it to exist or not to exist. Its actual existence does not come from its own nature, but from an external cause (the Creator). Therefore, anything that has a beginning is necessarily "contingent," because it first did not exist and then came into being. The logical opposite of a "contingent being" is a "Necessary Existent"—a being whose existence is essential, absolute, and independent of any external cause. This, as the argument concludes, is God.) The argument thus affirms God's absolute oneness and perfection, utterly transcendent beyond all comparison.

The argument's structure can be broken down as follows:

1. The Premise of Temporality (Huduth): (Note: In Kalam theology and Islamic philosophy, as represented by al-Ghazali and al-Razi, huduth refers to temporal origination or the coming into being of something after a period of non-existence, contrasting with qidam (eternity). The argument for huduth is known in Western philosophy as the Kalam Cosmological Argument, which posits that because the universe began to exist, it must have a creator.) The observable world consists of bodies (ajsām) invariably characterized by transient accidents, most evidently motion (haraka) and rest (sukun). The constant alteration of these states—from existence to non-existence and vice-versa—proves their contingent and temporal nature. A fundamental principle holds that whatever is eternal (qadīm) cannot be nullified. Since motion and rest are observed to cease, they cannot be eternal and must therefore be temporally originated.
2. The Inseparability of Accidents and Bodies: Crucially, bodies cannot exist independently of these accidents; their very existence entails being in a state of motion or rest. This establishes a logical concomitance. Applying the axiom that "whatever is concomitant with a temporally originated entity is itself temporally originated," it follows that the bodies—and thus the entire universe—must also be temporally originated. The universe, therefore, is not eternal but had a beginning.
3. The Impossibility of Self-Creation: (Note: The Qur'an presents a rational argument for the existence of God by posing a series of rhetorical questions: «Or were they created by nothing (without cause or creator), or are they the creators (of themselves)? Or did they create the heavens and Earth? Rather, they are not certain.» [Q. 52:35–36]. The interrogative "Or were they created by nothing?" is a rhetorical question of denial. It serves to reject the notion of a creation without a creator and to underscore the utter inability of any contingent, perishable being to create ex nihilo (from nothingness without any pre-existing matter)—a power that belongs solely to God, thereby implying that creation has a purpose and was not in vain—as directly affirmed in the Qur'an: «Then did you think that We created you uselessly and that to Us you would not be returned (for reckoning)?» [Q. 23:115]. This pattern of argumentation—using rhetorical questions to direct reflection toward divine creation—is a recurring motif in the Qur'an, found in chapters such as al-Waqi'a (56:57-72) and al-Ghashiya (88:17-20). While the verses specifically questions the origin of humanity, its logic extends to anything that has come into existence. The original Arabic uses the verb khuliqū (meaning to be created, made, or originated), a term that can apply universally to anything that has begun to exist. Therefore, the verses construct an airtight logical proof: since the universe and everything in it had a beginning, it must have a transcendent, uncaused cause who brought it into existence.) Having established the universe's contingent origin, the argument demonstrates its need for an external creator. It posits that for a contingent entity to bring itself into existence would create an irrational logical contradiction. Before any entity exists, the states of being and non-being are two equal potentialities. Actualizing existence requires a pre-existing factor—a preponderator (murajjih). This external agent provides a reason for existence to be chosen over non-existence, thus tipping the balance toward existence, as without such an agent, one would have to accept the impossible combination of two contradictory states: absolute equality between existence and non-existence, alongside a preponderance (tarjīh) without a preponderator.
4. The Necessity of an External Preponderator: This logical impossibility proves that no contingent entity can be self-existent.The mere existence of the universe, with its specific forms, measures, times, and places—all chosen from among infinite, equally possible alternatives—demands an external agent who made that choice. This agent is the Preponderator (al-Murajjih), who must be beyond the chain of contingency—the Necessary Existent (Wājib al-Wujūd).
5. The Rejection of Infinite Regress: The argument implicitly and explicitly rejects an infinite regress of causes (tasalsul). An infinite chain of contingent causes merely postpones the problem without providing an ultimate explanation for existence. The chain must therefore terminate in a first, uncaused cause.

Al-Sanusi's central argument for the existence of God rests on proving the impossibility of self-creation. He begins with the premise that the world is temporal and contingent (hādith), meaning its existence or non-existence was equally possible before it came into being, with no inherent reason for one state to prevail over the other. If the world had brought itself into existence without a creator, it would mean that one of two equal possibilities prevailed over the other for no reason, which is logically impossible.

This principle is illustrated by al-Mallali, a disciple of al-Sanusi, through an analogy of a perfectly balanced scale. He posits two identical scales in a state of equilibrium, where neither side is heavier than the other. In such a scenario, for one side to descend, a specific cause—such as adding a weight to it or removing one from the other—is necessary. To elaborate further, observing from a distance, if one sees the scales tilt one way and the other rise, and then later their positions reverse, the intellect necessarily concludes that an external cause—like a weight being added or removed—even if unseen, must have acted upon them. Therefore, to suggest the movement happened without a cause is rationally untenable.

Al-Mallali applies this to the state of the world: its previous non-existence and subsequent existence are analogous to the two sides of the scale. The transition from one state to its opposite must have a compelling reason, just like the moving scale. Thus, the fact that the world exists instead of not existing necessitates an external, transcendent cause that preferred existence over non-existence. This ultimate "Selector" or "Preferrer" (al-Murajjih) is God.

This foundational argument is supported by detailed logical proofs within the Kalam tradition that further establish the Creator's necessary attributes. The temporality of the world (i.e., it has a beginning), for instance, is rigorously demonstrated through its inherent dependency on transient "accidents" (a'rād), such as motion and rest. These accidents are themselves temporal, not eternal, as they are observed to change constantly from non-existence into existence (like starting to move) and from existence into non-existence (like stopping). If these accidents were eternal, they could never change or cease. Since physical bodies (ajsām) cannot exist independently of these accidents, and because whatever is inseparable from a temporal entity must itself be temporal, the entire physical universe is proven to be temporal and therefore created.

Having established the existence of a Creator, the argument then proves His necessary eternity (qidam). The reasoning is based on the premise that every existent must be either eternal or temporal. If God were temporal, He would require a cause or a creator to bring Him into existence. This creator, if it were also temporal, would in turn need another creator, and so on. This leads to two logical impossibilities:

1. Infinite Regress: An endless chain of creators or temporal causes continues infinitely backwards without a beginning, which is rationally impossible.
2. Circular Argument: A cause ultimately depending on itself for existence, which is absurd. Since a temporal God leads to an infinite regress of causes that ultimately results in the logical absurdity of God being His own creator (i.e., God created Himself), which is an impossible contradiction, as it requires the same entity to be both the creator and the created simultaneously. Since a cause cannot ultimately depend on itself for existence, and both outcomes are impossible (i.e., facing an infinite regress or falling into self-creation), (Note: The two impossible outcomes referred to in the text are: 1. The Infinite Regress of Causes: If God is temporal (i.e., exists within time and has a beginning), He must have a cause for His existence (a prior cause that brought Him into being). This first cause, if it is also temporal, must itself have a cause before it, and so on ad infinitum. Philosophy and logic consider an "infinite regress of actual causes" impossible because it fails to provide a solid foundation for existence. It postpones the answer indefinitely without ever reaching a true starting point or a first cause that explains the existence of the entire chain. 2. God Creating Himself (A Self-Contradiction or Logical Paradox): If we try to avoid the infinite regress, one might think that God is the cause of His own existence (i.e., He created Himself). This leads to a clear contradiction: the same entity being both the creator and the created simultaneously and in the same respect. It is like saying "one's own father," which is logically absurd. Because this assumes that God existed before He existed! In order to create Himself, He must already exist to perform the act of creation. But if He already exists, there is no need for Him to create Himself.) the original assumption that God is temporal is invalid. Therefore, it is necessarily true that God is eternal without a beginning.

Finally, the argument establishes God's necessary permanence (baqā'), meaning non-existence can never occur to Him. If God could cease to exist, His existence would be merely "contingent." However, a contingent existence is, by definition, temporal, which contradicts the already established proof of His eternity. Therefore, non-existence is impossible for Him, and His existence is necessarily permanent. This leads to a comprehensive classification of all existents:

1. God: For whom non-existence is impossible, both prior and posterior.
2. Accidents: For which non-existence is necessary, both before and after their brief existence, as they do not persist for two consecutive moments. (Note: Accidents (in philosophical terminology): These are things or attributes that do not persist in existence but rather require a cause to bring them into being at every single moment. Their existence must be preceded by non-existence, and must be followed by non-existence as well. This means they appear for an instant and then vanish, without persisting for two consecutive moments. Examples of accidents: Movement, change, sounds, shifting colors, fleeting thoughts. For example, when a car moves, its "position" at each moment is an accident that vanishes and is replaced by a new position in the next moment.)
3. Bodies: For which prior non-existence is necessary, but posterior non-existence is possible. These are the bodies (like planets and mountains), which were non-existent and then God gave them existence, and it is possible for them to perish.

Furthermore, the argument extends beyond mere existence to the specific attributes of the universe—its particular time, place, form, and properties. The central point here is that each of these, selected from an infinite set of equally possible alternatives, requires a determining agent. In essence, the text employs rationalist theology to argue that the universe's temporality, intricate design, and very specificity point inevitably toward a single, uncaused, eternal, and permanent Creator.

==== Proof of Divine oneness ====
The proof for God's oneness, as articulated by al-Sanusi, is structured as a logical argument based on the impossibility of multiple necessary beings. It operates as a reductio ad absurdum argument, where the assumption of a second god is shown to lead to a logical contradiction, thereby proving its falsehood.

The argument begins by positing a hypothetical duplicate of God—a being that shares all the attributes ascribed to God, such as absolute power, will, and knowledge.

- Scenario of Agreement: If these two independent, omnipotent beings both tried to create one single, simple thing (like an indivisible particle, known as al-Jawhar al-Fard or the indivisible substance), (Note: In Islamic theology, the concept of al-Jawhar al-Fard refers to the fundamental, indivisible, and inseparable particle regarded as the smallest unit of existence. Unlike the modern atom—which consists of smaller components such as electrons, protons, and neutrons—this concept resembles that of a basic building block of the universe. The comparison between al-Jawhar al-Fard and modern particles (such as quarks, leptons, or electrons) remains limited. This is because the classical kalām concept—with its singular, indivisible nature—does not fully align with the diverse and multiple fundamental particles in modern physics, making a direct correlation challenging.) its existence would be logically and conceptually impossible. The reason is that one single thing can't come from two separate independent sources, precisely because al-Jawhar al-Fard has only one, undivided existence in reality. This is a conceptual impossibility, not a mere failure of power. For it to be the product of two independent, omnipotent wills would mean that one single existence is simultaneously coming from two different sources, which is a fundamental contradiction—it would be like one thing being two things at the same time. Therefore, the creation of such a single entity is impossible.

This conceptual impossibility demonstrates that at least one of the two beings must be incapable of its creation. Since they are postulated as identical, what applies to one must apply to the other. So, both of them would be incapable. If they were both powerless to create one single thing, then they would be powerless to create anything at all, since there's no logical difference between creating one thing or everything. This total powerlessness means that the entire universe, with all its events and creatures, could never exist. However, the world is observed to exist. This means the initial premise of two gods leads to a false and impossible conclusion—namely, a non-existent world. Since this premise is false, it must be rejected. Therefore, the argument concludes that a necessary being must be one in essence, attributes, and actions.

- Scenario of Disagreement: (Note: Muslim theologians (mutakallimūn) often use a specific argument for Divine unity known as Dalil al-Tamanu' or Burhan al-Tamanu', which translates to the "Argument of Antagonism" or the "Proof from Hypothetical Mutual Prevention" or the "Argument from Hypothetical Mutual Hindrance." This argument aims to refute the possibility of two or more gods existing simultaneously. It posits that if there were two gods, the world would not exist, as their wills would inevitably conflict and prevent mutual action. Since an orderly and harmonious world exists, the argument concludes that its creator must be one. This proof finds its basis in Qur'anic verses, such as: Say, ˹O Prophet,˺ “Had there been other gods besides Him—as they claim—then they would have certainly sought a way to ˹challenge˺ the Lord of the Throne.” — Quran 17:42 Had there been other gods besides Allah in the heavens or the earth, both ˹realms˺ would have surely been corrupted. So Glorified is Allah, Lord of the Throne, far above what they claim. — Quran 21:22 Allah has never had ˹any˺ offspring, nor is there any god besides Him. Otherwise, each god would have taken away what he created, and they would have tried to dominate one another. Glorified is Allah above what they claim! — Quran 23:91 As these verses suggest, the argument posits that polytheism is incompatible with the creation and order of the universe. Consequently, it asserts that the existence and excellent order of the universe reflect and prove the existence of God and His oneness, indicating there can be only one transcendent will. If multiple deities existed, each would attempt to overpower the others, leading to inevitable conflicts and clashes. Such gods would desire to be sole lord of the universe, or at least to exert complete control over their spheres of creation and administration. The universe's manifest order contradicts this scenario. For one deity to successfully impose its authority, a restriction limiting the authority of the others would have to be made. For instance, if one god created the Sun and another the Moon, their movements would have to be constrained by a unified physical law to ensure consistency and prevent harm to Earth's inhabitants. Similarly, if one god controlled the wind and another controlled the rain, their conflicting desires could lead to chaos in the weather system. For example, if the god of wind wanted to create a storm and the god of rain wanted to create a drought, their actions would conflict, resulting in unpredictable and harmful weather patterns. This necessary constraint on their actions—that the acts of each god must be limited to function within a coherent system—is considered an attribute unbefitting any true deity. A true deity is sovereign and omnipotent, and any limitation on its actions would contradict its nature as an all-powerful being. Thus, the pursuit of full dominance by each god would likely result in the collapse of physical laws, potentially destroying the system. Another example illustrates this point: If there were one god of creation and one god of destruction, the god of creation could not operate successfully unless the god of destruction were suppressed or incapacitated. Since being limited or suppressed is incompatible with the definition of a sovereign deity, the existence of multiple such beings would lead to a perpetual struggle for power. The argument therefore affirms the existence of only one deity, Allah, as the sole creator and sustainer of the heavens and the earth, as emphasized in Qur'an 7:158, 21:22, and 41:37.) The case for impossibility becomes even clearer in situations of disagreement between divine wills. If one god wants to move a mountain, while another god wants to keep it still and prevent its movement.

In this case, there are only three possible outcomes:

1. The mountain moves. Therefore, the will of the first god is fulfilled, proving that the second god is incapable.
2. The mountain remains still. Consequently, the will of the second god is fulfilled, showing that the first god is incapable.
3. The mountain neither moves nor stays still. This represents a logical impossibility, as it violates the fundamental law of the excluded middle, where a statement must be either true or false.

In all possible scenarios, one of the two gods is proven incapable, and by logical extension, since they are considered equivalent, it reflects an incapacity on both. Incapacity is an imperfection that is unbefitting of a divine being. Since the universe exists and functions in a consistent and orderly manner, and since such contradictions or chaos are not observed, this line of reasoning provides a logical argument for a single, unique divine ruler and sustainer.

=== Attributes of God ===
The treatise details 20 necessary attributes of God, such as existence, oneness, pre-eternality, endlessness, absolute dissimilarity from creation, self-subsistence, and attributes like omnipotence, will, knowledge, and life. It also discusses 20 impossible attributes, which are the opposites of the necessary ones.

These are divided into three categories:

1. The Necessary Attributes: Twenty attributes that must be affirmed for God, as they pertain to His perfection (e.g., Existence, Oneness, Power, Knowledge).
2. The Impossible Attributes: Twenty attributes that are absolutely impossible to ascribe to God, as they denote imperfection, limitation, or creaturely characteristics. These are the direct opposites of the Necessary Attributes.
3. The Permissible Attributes (i.e., those that are rationally and scripturally allowable to ascribe to God): Attributes related to God's actions, which are possible for Him to do or not to do, based on His will (e.g., rewarding or punishing, sending messengers).

However, scholarly commentaries emphasize a critical nuance: this enumeration is not exhaustive, as God's perfections are infinite and boundless—consequently, His attributes are endless, beyond the finite human intellect's ability to fully comprehend or enumerate. Thus, the twenty attributes serve as a pedagogical and cognitive framework, representing the core set that:

1. Are Established by Evidence: Known through definitive rational proofs and textual evidence from the Qur'an and Sunnah.
2. Define a Sound Belief: Knowledge of these specific attributes is considered a religious obligation (taklif) for every morally responsible individual (mukallaf). They provide the necessary minimum for a theologically sound understanding of God.
3. Are Within Human Capacity: God has only obligated humans to know what is within the scope of their intellectual and spiritual capacity.

==== Necessary attributes ====
Twenty Necessary Attributes
One intrinsic attribute:	Existence: The dominant Ash'ari school holds that existence is not an additional attribute separate from God's essence. God's existence is identical to His essence itself. Therefore, it is not considered a distinct attribute. This contrasts with the view of Fakhr al-Din al-Razi, who held that existence is a real attribute additional to God's essence. However, since language necessitates describing His essence as 'existent,' some Ash'ari scholars include it among the attributes for clarity and ease of understanding.
Five negational attributes (i.e., they negate any deficiency):	1. Pre-eternality: He has no beginning.; 2. Everlastingness: His existence has no end. (Note: In Islamic belief, 'Everlastingness' means more than just lasting through time; it is an utter and absolute rejection of non-existence, impermanence, and annihilation.); 3. Transcendence beyond all contingents: He is absolutely unlike all created things.; 4. Self-subsistence: He does not need a place or a specifier.; 5. Oneness: He is absolutely one, singular in essence, unique in attributes, and sovereign in actions.

Seven conceptual attributes: (Note: Sifat al-Ma'ani (the "Conceptual Attributes" or the "Qualitative Attributes") are seven positive, essential qualities that confirm specific concepts about God. Each refers to an affirmative meaning or reality inherent in God's essence. These are Ability (Power), Will, Knowledge, Life, Hearing, Sight, and Speech. These attributes must be understood without implying physicality, limitation, or resemblance to human traits.)	Seven predicative attributes: (Note: There are seven attributes that are connected to the conceptual attributes.: 1. ‘Able’ is paired with divine ability; 2. ‘Willing’ is paired with divine will; 3. ‘All-Knowing’ is paired with divine knowledge; 4. ‘Living’ is paired with divine life; 5. ‘All-Hearing’ is paired with divine hearing; 6. ‘All-Seeing’ is paired with divine sight; and; 7. ‘All-Speaking’ is paired with divine speech.; Each conceptual attribute is paired with a predicative attribute, and reciprocally, each predicative attribute is paired with a conceptual attribute. Conceptual attributes are inseparable from predicative attributes. As predicative attributes are so connected, their evidence is the same as that of the conceptual attributes.)
1. Power: Over all "possible" things. (Note: God's power is absolute. It relates to all possible things (possibilities), meaning He can bring into existence or annihilate any logically possible entity. However, this power does not extend to necessities (such as God's own existence) or logical impossibilities (like a square circle or creating another god). For the attribute of Power to be relevant, its object must be logically possible. Suggesting otherwise would imply an imperfection, which is impossible for God.)	1. Being Powerful: As a result of the attribute of Power.
2. Will: Encompassing all possible things. (Note: God's will is the attribute that determines and specifies the creation of anything that is possible. This means that for any possible thing (like a person being born now or later, tall or short, happy or sad), the will of God is what chooses its specific time, state, and characteristics.)	2. Being Willing: As a result of the attribute of Will.
3. Knowledge: Encompassing all necessary, possible, and impossible matters.	3. Being Knowing: As a result of the attribute of Knowledge.
4. Life: Itself is not related to anything, but is the foundation for other attributes.	4. Being Living: As a result of the attribute of Life.
5. Hearing: Encompassing all existent things.	5. Being Hearing: As a result of the attribute of Hearing.
6. Sight: Encompassing all existent things.	6. Being Seeing: As a result of the attribute of Sight.
7. Speech: It is an eternal and uncreated divine attribute, distinct from human speech. It is not composed of letters, sounds, language, melody, grammatical structure, or any temporal sequence. Rather, it is a profound meaning established in God's essence, through which He reveals His will—as He did when He spoke to Moses. (Note: This eternal Speech relates to all objects of knowledge: the necessary, the possible, and the impossible. The letters of the Qur'an, along with its recitation, writing, and translation, are all created—they are mere expressions of God's uncreated Speech. Similarly, the believer's remembrance of God—such as reciting "Subhanallah" or "Alhamdulillah"—is created, but God Himself, the One being remembered and glorified, is eternal.)	7. Being Speaking: As a result of the attribute of Speech.

In Islamic theology, particularly within the Sunni Ash'ari school, God is understood through unique and eternal attributes that are inseparable from His essence. Among these, Power, Will, Knowledge, and Life are considered fundamental attributes for understanding God's nature and His role as the sole creator and sustainer of the universe.

Ash'ari theology holds that the very existence of the cosmos is contingent upon God possessing these core attributes. The argument follows a logical sequence of dependency:

1. Life: Serves as the foundational precondition. In theological terms, a lifeless entity cannot possess will, knowledge, or power. Therefore, God's eternal Life is seen as the necessary ground for all other active attributes.
2. Knowledge: This is God's eternal and all-encompassing knowledge of everything—what is necessary, possible, and impossible. It constitutes the foundational and archetypal framework of all existence.
3. Will: Following God's eternal knowledge of all possibilities, the Divine Will is the attribute that chooses, specifies, and determines which particular possibility will be actualized from the realm of potential. It decisively answers what will exist, when, how, and in what specific form.
4. Power: Finally, the attribute of Power executes the decree of the Will. It is the creative and effective force that instantly brings the specific possibility chosen by the Will into concrete reality, with no impediment or effort.

Within this framework, the Will acts as the "Specifier", making precise determinations, while Power functions as the "Effector" that actualizes those choices. The classical argument concludes that if any one of these attributes were absent, the chain of creation would be broken, making the existence of the contingent world impossible. Since the world is observed to exist, its existence is considered a rational proof for the necessity of these divine attributes.

This logical reasoning is also extended to other divine attributes, such as Speech. Ash'ari theology holds that God's communication with prophets through revealed scriptures logically requires Him to possess an eternal attribute of Speech. This divine Speech is not composed of sound or letters but is an everlasting attribute of God's essence. It is expressed in creation through the revealed words that humans receive, such as the Qur'an, which is believed to be the uncreated Speech of God.

Furthermore, the divine attributes of Hearing and Sight, like Speech and all of God's attributes, are understood to be eternal, perfect, and beyond any anthropomorphic conception (i.e., human-like qualities). They are entirely without corporeality, physicality, instruments, or organs, and are considered all-encompassing, relating to all things in existence without exception, limitation, or being subject to spatial-temporal constraints.

===== Will and power =====
In Islamic theology, the attributes of Will and Power are intrinsically linked, functioning as the complementary divine mechanisms through which God's decree is manifest in creation. They represent the seamless transition from eternal knowledge to tangible existence.

====== Will ======
God's will is universal and absolute, applying to all possible things. It specifies every aspect of creation, including the existence or non-existence of every entity, its duration, qualities, circumstances, and every event within its lifetime.

This Will operates in perfect harmony with God's eternal knowledge. In the Ash'ari school, everything God knows will happen is precisely what He wills to happen, forming a single, coherent, and predetermined divine plan. This perspective stands in contrast to the Mu'tazili view, which held that God's will is restricted to His command for belief and obedience, and that He does not will disbelief or sin, even though they occur. (Note: The Mu'tazilis emphasized the principle of Divine Justice, arguing that God's actions must conform to what human reason determines to be the "most optimal" or "best" outcome for His creation. They maintained that God only wills good acts (obedience), while humans "create" (i.e., perform or commit) their own evil acts (disobedience) independently of God's will [the Mu'tazili concept of Khalq al-Af'āl (creation of deeds)]. The Ash'ari response to this was: If God did not will disobedience, then something would occur within His dominion against His will. This would imply a deficiency in His sovereignty. Therefore, everything that exists—including all human actions, both righteous and sinful—is ultimately brought into being by divine power and determined by God's will. However, this does not negate human responsibility, as God's will grants the creature a choice, which He then creates [the Ash'ari concept of Kasb (acquisition)].) Sunni theologians argue that if anything happened in creation against God's will, it would imply a deficiency in His sovereignty and omnipotence, which is incompatible with the concept of a perfect deity.

====== Power ======
God's power is limitless and relates to all that is logically possible. He can bring anything into existence or annihilate it, transform states, and alter properties, provided the conceived state is logically coherent.

A fundamental principle, as articulated by al-Sanusi, is that Divine Power does not relate to logical impossibilities, such as "co-equal deity," "divine mortality," or "divine marriage and offspring." The inability to perform logical contradictions is not a deficiency; rather, it affirms both divine perfection and rational consistency. To "will" or "power" an impossibility is a meaningless concept, as it would entail a nonsensical reversal of reality itself.

====== Interplay of will and power ======
Will and Power are the twin pillars of divine action: the Will chooses and specifies, and the Power executes and brings into being. Nothing in the cosmos falls outside their scope. What God wills, His power inevitably brings to pass, and what His power enacts is a direct expression of His will.

This relationship is perfectly illustrated in theological discussions, such as the hypothetical question of whether God could place the entire world inside a needle's eye. Al-Sanusi clarifies the distinction: If it implies the logical absurdity of a large object occupying a small space without any change to their properties, it is not possible, as it falls into the realm of impossibility. However, if it means that God has the power to shrink the world or enlarge the needle's eye to accomplish this, then it is well within His power, and such an act would occur only if He so willed it. This demonstrates how Power actualizes what the Will decrees through logically possible means.

===== Hearing and sight =====
Within Sunni theology, particularly in the Ash'ari school, God's attributes of Hearing and Sight are affirmed through scriptural sources (the Qur'an and authentic Sunnah), rational evidence, and scholarly consensus.

Rational proof holds that if these attributes were absent, their opposites—deafness and blindness—would be implied. These are considered deficiencies incompatible with a perfect and supreme being.

Furthermore, these divine attributes are eternal and perfect, not dependent on physical organs, instruments, or any form of intermediation. While human senses are limited to specific phenomena (e.g., hearing for sounds, sight for colors and shapes), the divine Hearing and Sight encompass all aspects of existence without any limitation.

The Ash'ari theology maintains that any divine attribute must be coextensive with all of existence to avoid incompleteness. If God's hearing were limited to sounds only, it would imply a deficiency, contradicting the Islamic principle of divine perfection. Thus, divine Hearing must necessarily relate to all existents, whether eternal (like God's essence and attributes) or created (like human essences, attributes, and sounds). The attribute of sight follows a parallel theological structure.

These divine attributes relate to and perceive every single thing that exists. This includes:

- All beings: Whether they are eternal (like God's own speech) or created.
- All types: Substances and entities, as well as attributes and accidents.
- All perceptible qualities: Such as colors, sounds, tastes, smells, emotions, and even the inner thoughts or concealed intentions.

In his commentary, the Maliki-Ash'ari scholar al-Mallali provides the proof that divine Hearing is not restricted to sounds but rather encompasses all existents. This is established through both scriptural evidence and rational reasoning:

1. As for the textual evidence, he cites the Qur'anic statement: {And God spoke to Moses directly} [Qur'an 4:164]. (Note: The Qur'an relates that Prophet Moses heard the speech of God (e.g., Qur'an 4:164, 7:143-144).) Al-Mallali explains that this verse is clear proof that Moses heard God's eternal speech, which is not composed of physical letters, sounds, or temporal sequences. If hearing were exclusively limited to perceiving sounds, it would have been impossible for Moses to hear God's speech (because it is not a sound). This invalidates the restriction of hearing to sounds alone and establishes that it must relate to all existing things. Al-Mallali then emphasizes: 'This conclusion applies to the limited created human hearing (of Moses)—so what then can be said about the eternal Hearing of God Himself?!'
2. As for the rational proof, if God's hearing were specific only to sounds, it would require a 'specifier' to limit its scope. Anything that is dependent, limited and needs a specifier is contingent and created. Such dependency is impossible for God, who is perfect and self-sufficient. Therefore, it is rationally necessary that God's hearing must encompass every existing thing, just like His sight.

===== Speech =====
Within Sunni theology, the divine attribute of God's speech, known as Kalam, is understood as an eternal and fundamental aspect of His essence. Unlike human speech, it is not composed of physical letters, sounds, or sequences that occur in time. It does not have parts that begin or end, nor does it involve any form of ordering or succession. This eternal attribute, while one and unified, encompasses and communicates all of God's infinite knowledge.

The Qur'an is regarded as the expressed manifestation of this eternal speech in a human language—specifically, the miraculous Arabic composition that was revealed to the Prophet Muhammad. Therefore, when Muslims refer to the Qur'an as the word of God, it is understood as the literal representation of His eternal speech, without the belief that God's divine attribute itself instantiated or resides within the physical pages or recited sounds.

The ultimate nature of this attribute, like the nature of God Himself, is considered beyond full human comprehension. Ash'ari scholars sometimes used the analogy of "inner, internal speech" or "psychic speech" (the Arabic term al-kalam al-nafsi refers to the unspoken words in a person's mind) to argue against theological groups like the Mu'tazila and the Hashwiyya (Note: The Hashwiyya or Hashawiyya (Arabic: الحشوية) is a pejorative term used in Islamic theology to refer to a heterodox group or sect characterized by an extreme literalist approach to religious texts (the Qur'an and Hadith), leading to anthropomorphism (comparing God to created things). They are described as those who cling to the apparent, literal meanings of ambiguous texts (known as al-mutashabihat) regarding God's attributes, without interpretation (ta'wil) or referring the ultimate meaning to God (tafwid). This literalism is seen by other theological schools (such as the Ash'aris and Maturidis) as resulting in tashbih (likening God to humans) or tajsim (corporealism/attribution of a body to God). They were accused of believing God has a physical form, sits on a throne, or moves from place to place. The word itself is sometimes linked to hashw, meaning "filling" or "stuffing," implying people who stuffed their works with indiscriminate, potentially unsound hadith without critical theological analysis.) who claimed that God's speech is only created sounds and letters. However, this analogy was strictly used to make a logical point about the possibility of non-physical speech and was never meant to suggest that God's speech is similar in its essence to human inner speech, which is itself a created and sequential accident. The core of the doctrine affirms that God's manner of speaking is uniquely eternal and sublime, utterly distinct from all creation.

==== Impossible attributes ====
These attributes are the direct opposites of the 20 "Necessary" or "Obligatory" attributes that define God's perfection. Denying these imperfections maintains the concept of a transcendent, absolutely perfect Creator.

Twenty Impossible Attributes
1. Non-Existence: It is impossible for God not to exist. His existence is necessary.
2. Coming into Existence: It is impossible for God to have a beginning, as He is eternal and uncreated.
3. Perishability: It is impossible for God to cease to exist. He is perpetual and everlasting.
4. Resembling Creatures: It is impossible for God to be like His creation. This includes:
  1. Being a Body: God is not a physical entity that occupies space.
  2. Being an Accident (a quality that depends on a body): He is not a temporary quality that depends on something else (like color depends on an object).
  3. Being in a Direction: God is not "above," "below," or "inside" the universe. He is not confined to any spatial direction.
  4. Having a Direction: He does not possess spatial dimensions like length, width, or depth.
  5. Being Bound by Place or Time: God is not limited by or contained within a specific location or a moment in time.
  6. Change in His Essence: (Note: Having His essence be a site for temporal events.) His eternal essence is not a substrate for temporary events or qualities.
  7. Being Characterized by Smallness or Largeness: He cannot be described by physical size, as this is a property of created things.
5. Not Self-Subsisting: (Note: Having a motive or need behind His actions and judgments.) It is impossible for God to not be self-sufficient. His existence depends neither on a carrier (substratum) nor a cause, and He requires no external agent to specify His actions or define His nature. He is absolutely independent.
6. Not Being One: It is impossible for God not to be absolutely one. This means He cannot be:
  1. Being Composite: God's essence is not a compound or a collection of parts.
  2. Having an Equal or Similar: Nothing is equal or similar to Him in His essence, attributes, or actions.
  3. Having a Partner in Creation: There is no other creator or co-creator alongside Him.

Seven impossible opposites of conceptual attributes:	Seven impossible opposites of predicative attributes:
1. Incapacity: It is impossible for God to be incapable or powerless over anything that is logically possible. His power is absolute and limitless.	1. Being Incapable: It is impossible as the opposite of being Powerful.
2. Compulsion: It is impossible for God to act against His own will. He does not create something while "hating" its existence (i.e., against His will) or being forced to do it. Every act of creation is a deliberate act of His sovereign will.	2. Being Compelled: It is impossible as the opposite of being Willing.
3. Ignorance: It is impossible for God to be ignorant, to learn, to be in doubt, to forget, or to need to figure anything out. His knowledge is all-encompassing—including the past, present, future, and all hypothetical scenarios.	3. Being Ignorant: It is impossible as the opposite of being Knowing.
4. Death: It is impossible for God to die or cease to exist. He is the Ever-Living, the one who grants life and is the source of all life.	4. Being Dead: It is impossible as the opposite of being Living.
5. Deafness: It is impossible for God to be deaf. His hearing is all-encompassing, perceiving everything without the need for sound waves or physical ears.	5. Being Deaf: It is impossible as the opposite of being Hearing.
6. Blindness: It is impossible for God to be blind. His sight encompasses all things, without needing eyes or light.	6. Being Blind: It is impossible as the opposite of being Seeing.
7. Muteness: It is impossible for God to be mute.	7. Being Mute: It is impossible as the opposite of being Speaking.

These 20 impossible attributes serve to protect the Islamic concept of God's absolute transcendence (tanzih). They affirm that the Creator is fundamentally different from His creation—free from all limitations, needs, imperfections, and comparisons. This understanding leads to a pure monotheism where God alone is worthy of worship.

==== Permissible attributes ====
The permissible (al-Ja'iz) in relation to God is defined as "the doing or not doing of every possible thing." This means that for any event or action that is rationally possible (i.e., its existence or non-existence is not logically contradictory), God has the absolute freedom to either bring it into existence or not. Nothing within the realm of possibility is obligatory upon Him, nor is it impossible for Him to do.

In simpler terms, God is not compelled by any external force or internal deficiency to act in a specific way. His actions are a result of His absolute will, wisdom, and grace.

Key examples include:

- Reward and Punishment: God rewarding the obedient with Paradise and punishing the disobedient with Hellfire is a matter of His will. While His justice and promise make it expected, it is not a rational necessity in and of itself.
- Sending Messengers: The sending of prophets and messengers is an act of God's grace and mercy toward humanity. While it is immensely beneficial for guiding creation, it is not something God is obliged to do.
- Doing What is Good and Most Beneficial: God often does what is best for His creation, but this is based on His wisdom and grace, not on a rational obligation. He is the ultimate benefactor, and no one has a "right" over Him to demand a specific action.
- The Beatific Vision: The belief that believers will see God in the Hereafter is considered a possible act that God has graciously willed to occur, as informed by revelation.

From a purely rational perspective, the existence or non-existence of these matters was equally possible prior to divine revelation. However, following revelation, their occurrence is affirmed by religious texts, rendering them certain by divine decree rather than rational necessity.

===== Possibility in relation to God's power =====
Al-Sanusi addresses a core concept concerning the nature of God's power, specifically what is considered "possible" (al-mumkin) for God to do or leave undone. A possible thing is defined as something whose existence and non-existence are equally conceivable; that is, something that may either exist (be created) or not exist (remain in non-existence). For God, performing any such possible action or choosing to refrain from it is equally permissible (ja'iz).

The rational proof for this permissibility:

1. If it were obligatory for God to perform a certain possible action, or if it were impossible for God to perform it (meaning its non-performance was obligatory), the very nature of that "possible" thing would be fundamentally changed.
2. If a possible action became obligatory for God, it would cease to be "possible" and would instead become "necessary" or "obligatory".
3. If a possible action became impossible for God to do, it would cease to be "possible" and would instead become "impossible".

Therefore, the concept of a "possible" thing is defined by the fact that it is neither necessary nor impossible. To compel God to act or to prevent Him from acting in relation to a possible thing would entail a logical contradiction—it would convert a possibility into either an obligation or an impossibility, which fundamentally "flips the realities".

Since such a conceptual reversal is impossible, the conclusion follows: it is permissible for God to perform any possible action or to leave it unperformed. This affirms God's absolute freedom and will concerning all created things, as nothing in creation (which is entirely "possible") can be an obligation or an impossibility for the Creator.

===== Historical and theological context =====
This doctrine was shaped by debates among major Islamic theological schools, primarily the Ash'ari and Maturidi schools, representing mainstream Sunni orthodoxy against the Mu'tazili school.

- The Mu'tazili View: They argued that reason obliges God to do what is best and most beneficial for His creation. They posited that divine justice and wisdom rationally necessitate that God reward the obedient, punish the disobedient, and always act in the most optimal manner for His creatures, as failing to choose the "best" option would contradict His wisdom and justice, rendering it rationally impossible. For instance, they might argue that He must guide everyone if He is just. (Note: Al-Ash'ari, who was originally a Mu'tazili, later rejected their views to emphasize God's absolute freedom.)
- The Ash'ari Rebuttal: The Ash'ari position firmly and fundamentally rejects the Mu'tazili view, arguing that imposing human-derived rational obligations on God's actions constitutes a grave compromise of His absolute freedom, omnipotence, sovereign will, and undisputed majesty. (Note: In the Ash'ari framework, God is the ultimate sovereign who is not subject to any external moral framework or "necessary good"; His will is the very source of what is deemed good and permissible.) In his commentary, al-Sanusi systematically critiques the Mu'tazili stance by referencing observable reality: hardship and tribulation exist, and not everyone is guided, which contradicts their premise of a rationally necessitated optimal world.

This systematic critique is grounded in two realities:

1. The Evidence of Observable Reality: He points to the empirical world, rife with hardships, tribulations, disease, and poverty—phenomena that contradict the Mu'tazili claim of a rationally compelled "principle of the best" (al-aslah). If God were bound by such a principle, these apparent evils and sufferings devoid of obvious benefit would be impossible. Their existence proves that God's will transcends human notions of immediate benefit, invalidating the Mu'tazili premise.
2. The Evidence from Divine Law: Al-Sanusi highlights the nature of religious obligation (taklif) itself, which inherently involves effort, hardship, and renunciation of desires. If God's actions were tied to the easiest path, He would grant rewards without requiring struggle. He counters the Mu'tazili argument of hidden benefits (e.g., future reward) by asserting that God could bestow those rewards directly, without toil. Thus, taklif stems not from rational necessity but from God's grace, wisdom, and sovereign will—purposes that may exceed human comprehension.

==== Negation of anthropomorphism ====
A fundamental aspect of al-Sanusi's belief system is the complete rejection of anthropomorphism (tashbih) and corporalism (tajsim) in relation to God while affirming attributes in a manner befitting divine perfection. This principle, known as tanzih, asserts God's complete transcendence, uniqueness, and otherness from His creation.

For al-Sanusi, any understanding of God that compares Him to His creations—be it in shape, essence, physical attributes, or place—constitutes a serious theological error in direct opposition to the essence of pure monotheism (tawhid).

The methodology for affirming God's attributes is therefore always coupled with this negation. For instance, while the text affirms that God possesses attributes like Life, Power, and Hearing, it immediately clarifies that these attributes are "not like our life, not like our power, and not like our hearing." They are eternal, perfect, and utterly unique, befitting His divine majesty. This applies critically to attributes that might have anthropomorphic connotations, such as God's "Hand", "Face", or "Establishing on the Throne" (istiwā'). Following the mainstream Ash'ari tradition, al-Sanusi upholds the doctrine of bila kayf (without modality).

This means that while these terms are accepted as they appear in the Qur'an, their true nature is not comprehended by human reason, and they must be interpreted metaphorically (ta'wil) in a manner that preserves absolute divine transcendence. The believer affirms the wording while consciously negating any literal or creaturely meaning, entrusting the true meaning to God (tafwid).

This sophisticated approach allows the creed to maintain a balance between scriptural fidelity and rational theological coherence, ensuring that the concept of God remains strictly monotheistic and beyond human imagination.

=== Prophethood ===
It outlines the necessary attributes of prophets, which are: truthfulness, trustworthiness, infallibility from major sins and errors in revelation, and intelligence. The opposites of these attributes (such as lying, betrayal, and foolishness) are deemed impossible for them. However, human contingencies (like ordinary human acts, such as illnesses or forgetfulness in worldly matters) that in no way impugn their perfection or credibility are considered possible.

=== Testimonies of faith ===
The two Islamic testimonies of faith are explicitly mentioned in the final lines of the text. The entire treatise is built to prove the two Shahadas through rational evidences and arguments, making them the implicit core of the text.

=== Afterlife ===
It affirms the resurrection of the body and soul, the final judgment, and the reality of Paradise and Hell.

=== Roots of disbelief and heresies ===
In his commentary, al-Sanusi explains that falling into major errors in Islamic creed ('aqidah) often stems from six fundamental intellectual missteps, which he calls "roots of disbelief". These are not mere minor mistakes but foundational errors that lead to serious deviations in belief. They are primarily concerned with incorrect methodologies for understanding God, His attributes, and His actions.

Al-Sanusi outlines a six fundamental tenets of disbelief
Foundations of Kufr	Definition	Error
1. Intrinsic Necessity	The belief that creation emanates from God by sheer necessity of His essence, without any act of His free will or choice.	This is the fundamental error of certain philosophers. They argued that the universe is a necessary and eternal consequence of God's essence, which leads them to deny God's voluntary attributes like will, power, and choice. Consequently, they wrongly believed the world is eternal (without a beginning), contradicting the established Islamic doctrine that God created the universe in time by His will.
2. Rational Deeming of Good and Evil	This belief holds that human reason alone, independent of divine revelation, can definitively determine what is fundamentally good or evil, and thus dictate what God must do or decree, thereby making God's actions contingent upon purposes and interests (bringing benefits and repelling harms), such that He is obliged – according to their claim – to observe what is most beneficial for His servants.	This is the error of groups like the Mu'tazilis and the Brahmans (a group of philosophers who denied prophethood). They claimed that God is obliged to act in the most beneficial way for His creation and that His laws can be fully deduced by reason. This wrongly imposes human standards of judgment upon God, limits His absolute freedom, and undermines the necessity of prophetic revelation.
3. Blind Imitation	Adhering to unexamined beliefs or practices purely out of tribalism, habit, or the dogmatic and bigoted, blind following of ancestors, without any intellectual effort to seek the truth.	This is the foundational principle of the idolaters' disbelief and others, who, when called to truth, reply: "We found our fathers upon a course (Literally, Ummah: a nation or community following a specific path, tradition, religion, or leadership), and we will certainly follow in their footsteps" [Qur'an 43:23]. It emphasizes that true faith must be based on personal insight and certainty, not mere blind tradition. (Note: In Islam, "al-Baseera" is a profound inner understanding and a firm certainty of the heart. This concept is the foundation of the call to God, as clarified in the Qur'an in the command to the Prophet Muhammad: {Say: "This is my way: I call to God on Baseera (clear evidence and with sure knowledge), I and those who follow me."} [Yusuf: 108]. As such, a call to God based on "baseera" is distinct from merely following tradition. Baseera provides the caller with deep comprehension and a strong argument, enabling them to confront doubts and objections with steadfastness and clarity. Therefore, Islamic scholars emphasize that strong faith must be built upon understanding and insight, not on blind imitation of ancestral practices.)
4. Habitual Association	This is the belief in an intrinsic (natural) connection between apparent causes and their effects. Thus, the ignorant person thinks that fire burns by its own nature and water quenches thirst by its own power, thereby ignoring God as the true and ultimate Cause.	This is the error of naturalists (those who believe in laws of nature independent of God) and even some ignorant believers. For example, they might believe that eating satiates hunger by its own nature, or water quenches thirst by itself, instead of recognizing that these are merely customs established by God, who is the true provider of all effects.
5. Compound Ignorance	This is a dangerous state of being ignorant of something and simultaneously being ignorant of one's own ignorance. In other words, a person holds a false belief (simple ignorance), and then is ignorant of his own ignorance of that thing, thus thinking he is correct. It is compound ignorance because it combines ignorance of the truth and ignorance of that ignorance itself.	The person is misguided but believes they are rightly guided. This makes them resistant to correction. Al-Sanusi gives the example of philosophers who believe in the eternal nature of the celestial spheres; they are not only wrong (first ignorance) but also convinced of their correctness (the compounding second ignorance), which solidifies their error.
6. Rigid Literalism without Rational Insight in Theology	A strictly literal adherence to the apparent meaning (zahir) of the texts describing God, which rejects the necessary use of sound intellectual interpretation (ta'wil), is problematic. It neglects the role of reason in correctly understanding these texts in accordance with linguistic rules and fundamental creedal principles, which are essential for affirming a divine perfection transcendent beyond human attributes (tanzih).	This is the error of the Hashwiyya (anthropomorphists). (Note: According to Taj al-Din al-Subki (d. 771/1370): The Hashwiyya are a group who deviated from the right path in their blindness. They take Allah's verses purely in their literal sense, believing that is their intended meaning. They were named thus because al-Hasan al-Basri found some of them in his circle (halaqa) holding unseemly speech, so he ordered for them to be moved to the bowels or belly (hasha) of the circle. In that sense they are the Hashawiyya or 'Visceralists.' It was also said that they were named thus because they are among, or actually are, the mujassima -- those who ascribe a body to Allah. In that sense they are associated to 'stuffing' (hashw) and are called the Hashwiyya or 'Crammers.') They take verses that mention God's "Hand," "Face," or "Istiwa' on the Throne" in a literal, physical sense, leading to beliefs in anthropomorphism (tashbih) and corporealism (tajsim) for God. (Note: The correct approach, as held by Sunni orthodoxy, is to believe in these attributes without ascribing a manner to them or specifying their modality—a principle known as Bila Kayf. This entails believing in the attributes as revealed while simultaneously denying any physical form or direction for God.) Ultimately, al-Sanusi concluded his speech by citing Qur'anic verse 3:7, which discusses the clear and ambiguous verses.

For al-Sanusi, the path of correct Sunni belief avoids all these extremes. It relies on a balance between sound revelation (Qur'an and Sunnah) and sound intellectual reasoning, understanding that God's attributes are beyond human comprehension, and His acts are the result of His free will, not necessity or compulsion.

== Methodology and significance ==
Al-Sanusi's methodology is a prime example of the science of Kalam (Islamic rational or dialectic theology). (Note: 'Ilm al-Kalam (The Science of Discourse) has various names. Imam Abu Hanifa called it "al-Fiqh al-Akbar" (The Greatest Jurisprudence). It is also known as the science of monotheism ('Ilm al-Tawhid), the science of the foundations of religion (Usul al-Din), and the science of theoretical consideration and deduction ('Ilm al-Nazr wal-Istidlal).) He employs rational deduction (dalil 'aqli) alongside transmitted evidence (dalil naqli) from the Qur'an and Sunnah. The text is not merely a list of beliefs but a structured argument demonstrating that these beliefs are necessarily true from a rational standpoint.

Its significance is as follows:

- Educational Pillar: For centuries, Umm al-Barahin has been a standard introductory text in Islamic curricula, particularly in North and West Africa, teaching students how to approach theology with precision and logic.
- Doctrinal Defense: It served as a powerful bulwark against literalist and anthropomorphic interpretations of God's attributes, as well as against philosophical skepticism.
- Commentarial Tradition: Its conciseness spurred a vast tradition of commentaries, super-commentaries, and poems, expanding on its dense meanings and ensuring its continued relevance.

=== Comparative overview ===
While creedal texts like al-'Aqida al-Tahawiyya are celebrated for their concise, narrative summary of Sunni creed, heavily rooted in transmitted tradition (naql), al-Sanusi's work is fundamentally structured around a meticulous, proof-based framework of rational demonstration ('aql).

A comparison with a major work from the Maturidi school, such as Tabsirat al-Adilla by Abu al-Mu'in al-Nasafi (d. 508/1114)—a massive summa covering a vast array of theological issues in profound detail—reveals a fundamental disparity in scope and scale. While Umm al-Barahin offers a focused, concentrated proof of core tenets designed as a foundational primer for students, Tabsirat al-Adilla represents a comprehensive treatise encompassing extensive details and debates.

In addition, a brief comparison can be made with other similar Islamic creedal texts. For instance, al-'Aqa'id al-Nasafiyya by Najm al-Din 'Umar al-Nasafi (d. 537/1142), like Umm al-Barahin, is a concise text encompassing the fundamentals of belief. As a Maturidi text, it is characterized by its balanced integration of reason and transmitted knowledge, with a focus on establishing creedal tenets through concentrated rational proofs. This makes its educational function similar to that of Umm al-Barahin, despite the difference in their theological schools.

==== Position within the Maghrebi heritage ====
The position of Umm al-Barahin is further clarified when compared to the output of Maghrebi Ash'aris, particularly the work Muqaddimat al-Marashid ila 'Ilm al-'Aqa'id (Introductory Guides to the Science of Doctrines/Beliefs) by the Maliki scholar Ibn Khumayr al-Sibti (d. 614/1217), a text considered one of the most important Maghrebi contributions to theological discourse. If Umm al-Barahin is a model of extreme focus and concision, then Muqaddimat al-Murashid—despite its author's description of it as a "middle ground avoiding verbosity and approaching brevity"—appears, by contemporary comparison, as a voluminous and expansive compendium. It is structured into ten chapters, including introductory preludes and seven major principles of creed, with extensive elaboration across 132 sub-chapters covering refutations of critics of rationalist theology (kalam), the foundations of reason and moral obligation (taklif), as well as proofs for the Creator, His oneness, attributes, prophethood, and transmitted matters (al-sam'iyyat).

This methodological contrast highlights the diversity within the Ash'ari tradition itself, illustrating a spectrum of presentation styles within the same Maliki-Ash'ari tradition of the Maghreb: from the sharp, extreme succinctness of Umm al-Barahin, to the comprehensive, encyclopedic nature of Muqaddimat al-Murashid. Nonetheless, both works—as products of the Maliki-Maghrebi theological heritage—affirm the central importance of rational inquiry in proving creedal matters.

A further comparison within the Maghrebi tradition can be made with Ibn Khaldun's Lubab al-Muhassal. While al-Sanusi's Umm al-Barahin is an original, tightly structured primer of pure rational demonstration for students, Ibn Khaldun's work is a critical digest and summary of the existing theological and philosophical arguments found in Fakhr al-Din al-Razi's al-Muhassal, characterized by its analytical, synoptic overview of the entire tradition. Both, however, affirm the paramount role of rational inquiry.

On the other hand, al-'Aqida al-Murshida (the Guiding Creed) by Ibn Tumart (d. 524/1130), which al-Sanusi himself commented upon, represents another model of concise Maghrebi creedal texts. It focused on affirming divine oneness and attributes while rejecting anthropomorphism within the Ash'ari tradition, differing from Umm al-Barahin in its emphasis on reformist and preaching purposes, adopting a simplified methodology aimed at reaching general learners.

Thus, while these texts serve as concise doctrinal summaries, each carries its own methodological and doctrional particularities, highlighting the rich diversity within the Islamic theological heritage. (Note: Umm al-Barahin can be compared to similar concise doctrinal texts in other religions in terms of structure and function, not doctrinal content. In Christianity, the "Apostles' Creed" or the "Nicene Creed" serves as its functional equivalent. In Judaism, the "Thirteen Principles of Faith" formulated by Maimonides represents the most famous concise text summarizing Jewish beliefs. These texts serve as educational summaries of fundamental tenets, tools for religious identity, and reference frameworks for religious communities. The fundamental difference between them lies in their doctrinal content, which reflects the unique theological concepts of each religion (such as absolute monotheism versus the Trinity, and the concept of prophecy).)

=== The Sanusi-Tha'alibi pedagogical system ===
The methodological framework of al-Sanusi's Umm al-Barahin is elucidated by examining its relationship with the etymological work Haqa'iq al-Tawhid (The Truths of Tawhid) by his teacher, 'Abd al-Rahman al-Tha'alibi (d. 875/1470). This relationship represents more than just a typical author-commentator dynamic, forming instead a cohesive pedagogical system.

While Umm al-Barahin is a model of high concision and rigorous rational demonstration (relying on 'aql, reason), its effectiveness depends on a precise grasp of its specialized logical and theological terminology. This is the critical function served by al-Tha'alibi's Haqa'iq al-Tawhid. It is not a conventional line-by-line exegesis but rather a foundational, propaedeutic work that provides the essential logical and semantic toolkit required to access al-Sanusi's proofs.

Al-Tha'alibi's logical approach sought to "establish the etymological roots" (ta'thil) of the concepts in his student's work. Thus, Haqa'iq al-Tawhid acts as an essential preparatory key, ensuring students first achieve a correct conceptual understanding (tasawwur) of the specialized terms—such as those related to God's attributes and logical proofs—before assenting to the creedal conclusions (tasdiq).

In short, while Umm al-Barahin lays out the foundational beliefs, Haqa'iq al-Tawhid provides the necessary logical tools and definitions to understand them. Together, they form a complete package for understanding Ash'ari creed.

== Commentaries and summaries ==
Umm al-Barahin has been a foundational text in Islamic scholasticism, generating a rich tradition of exegetical works aimed at both elucidating its complexities and making its core tenets accessible to students. This scholarly engagement can be divided into two main categories: commentaries and summaries.

=== Commentaries and glosses ===
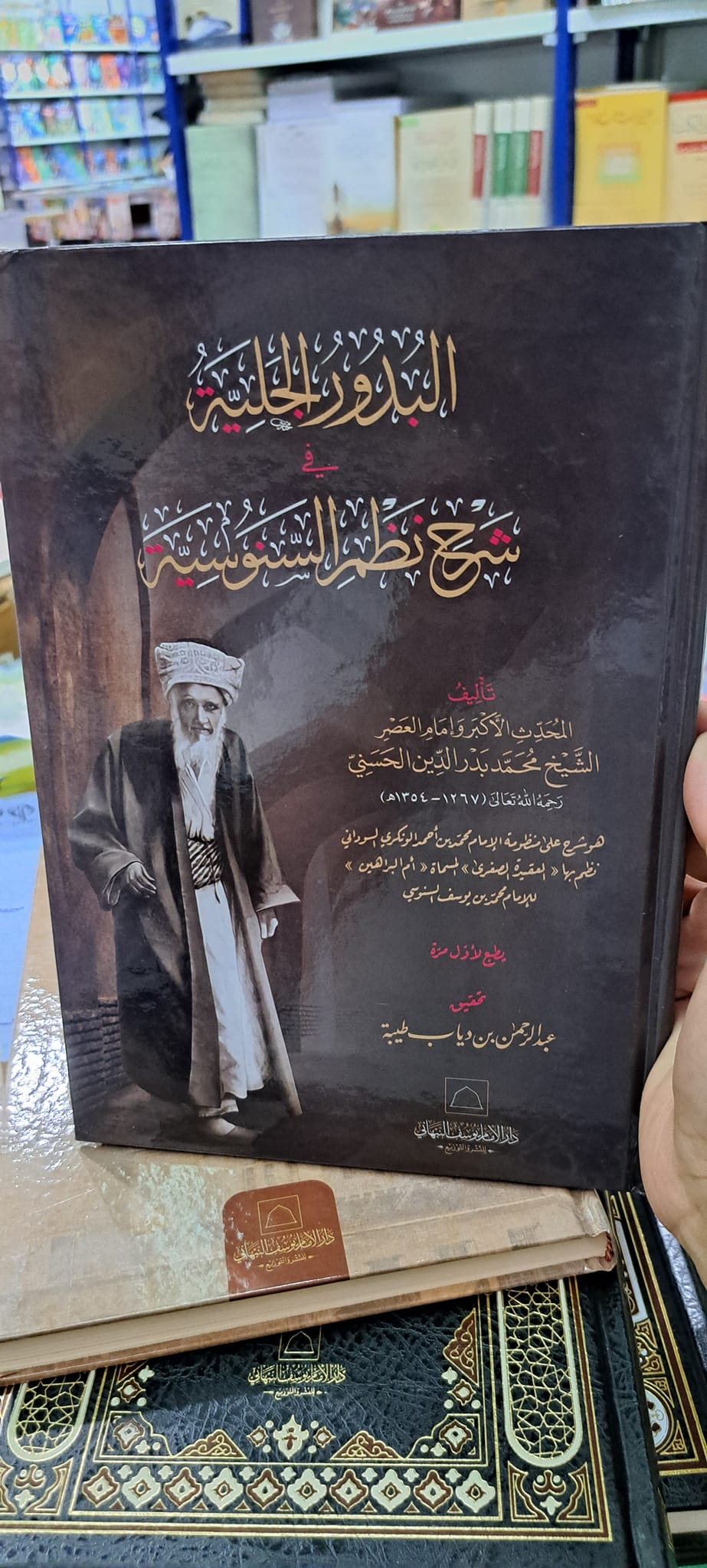
The book al-Budur al-Jaliyya by Badr al-Din al-Hasani is a commentary on the didactic poem of Muhammad b. Ahmad al-Wankari (d. 1066/1655), which itself is a versification of Umm al-Barahin.

A vast collection of commentaries, super-commentaries, and glosses has been written on Umm al-Barahin. The most prominent commentators include:

- Al-Sanusi himself composed a commentary upon the Umm al-Barahin which he called Sharh al-Sughra. He then composed a commentary upon that commentary called Sharh Sughra al-Sughra. His chief disciples Muhammad ibn 'Umar al-Mallali (was alive in 897/1492) and Ahmad ibn Aghadir (dead at the beginning of the 5th decade of the 10th century AH) both composed commentaries upon the Umm al-Barahin.
- Ahmad ibn 'Umar Aqit al-Tumbukti (d. 942/1535), the father of Ahmad Baba. Among his teachers were Jalal al-Din al-Suyuti (d. 911/1505) and Khalid al-Azhari (d. 905/1499).
- Muhammad ibn 'Abd al-Jabbar al-Fajiji (d. 950/1544).
- 'Abd al-Jalil ibn Muhammad ibn 'Uzum al-Qayrawani (d. 960/1553).
- 'Umar al-Wazzan al-Qastantini (d. 960/1553).
- 'Abd al-Rahman al-Akhdari (d. 983/1575), the author of al-Sullam al-Munawraq (the Ornamented Ladder), a renowned 143-line poem on Islamic logic.
- Ahmad al-Manjur (d. 995/1587).
- Ibn 'Ardun (d. 1012/1603).
- Ibn Maryam (d. 1014/1605).
- Al-Hasan ibn Yusuf ibn Mahdi al-Zayati (d. 1023/1613).
- Ahmad Baba al-Timbukti (d. 1036/1627).
- 'Abd al-Rahman ibn Muhammad al-Fasi (d. 1036/1626).
- Muhammad al-Ma'mun al-Hafsi (d. 1037/1627).
- Ahmad al-Maqqari (d. 1041/1632).
- Shihab al-Din Ahmad ibn Muhammad ibn 'Ali al-Ghunaymi (d. 1044/1634).
- Ibn 'Allan (d. 1057/1647), a prolific Hadith scholar who authored two famous commentaries, usually considered the most authoritative on al-Nawawi's Riyadh al-Salihin and al-Adhkar.
- Al-Husayn ibn Muhammad al-Namawi (d. 1060/1650).
- Yasin ibn Zayn al-Din al-Himsi (d.1061/1651), a prominent Shafi'i linguist and grammarian from Homs, whose commentary is preserved in a manuscript at the Austrian National Library.
- 'Isa ibn 'Abd al-Rahman al-Saktani (d. 1062/1651).
- Muhammad ibn Musa ibn Muhammad al-Jammazi al-Husayni (d. 1065/1655), the student of Mar'i al-Karmi (d. 1033/1623).
- 'Abd al-Salam al-Laqqani (d. 1078/1668), the son of Ibrahim al-Laqqani (d. 1041/1631).
- Muhammad ibn Mansur al-Hudhudi (d. 1082/1671). The Vatican Library holds a manuscript of his commentary.
- Yahya al-Shawi (d. 1096/1685).
- Muhammad al-Kharashi (d. 1101/1690).
- Al-Hasan al-Yusi (d. 1102/1691).
- Muhammad ibn 'Abd al-Qadir al-Tawati (d. 1115/1704).
- Mustafa al-Ramasi (d. 1136/1724).
- 'Abd al-Ghani al-Nabulsi (d. 1144/1731).
- 'Abd Allah ibn 'Abd al-Rahman al-Rumi (d. 1164/1750).
- 'Ali ibn Muhammad al-Majduli (d. 1167/1754).
- Muhammad al-Salamuni (d. after 1173/1759).
- Ahmad ibn Muhammad al-Suhaymi (d. 1178/1764).
- Ahmad al-Mallawi (d. 1181/1767).
- Ahmad al-Jawhari (d. 1182/1768).
- 'Ali al-Sa'idi al-'Adawi (d. 1189/1775).
- 'Atiyya al-Ajhuri al-Burhani (d. 1190/1776).
- Al-Husayn al-Wartilani (d. 1193/1779).
- Sulayman ibn Taha al-Akrashi (d. 1199/1785).
- Ahmad al-Dardir (d. 1201/1786).
- Muhammad al-Fayyumi al-'Aqqad (d. 1202/1787).
- Sulayman al-Jamal (d. 1204/1790).
- 'Abdallah al-Sharqawi (d. 1227/1812).
- Muhammad ibn 'Arafa al-Disuqi (d. 1230/1815).
- Ahmad ibn 'Isa al-Ansari (d. 1241/1826).
- Ibrahim al-Bajuri (d. 1277/1861).
- Ibrahim ibn Ahmad al-Marghani (d. 1349/1931).
- Muhammad al-Makki al-Batawri (d. 1355/1936).
- Ahmad ibn Muhammad al-Rahuni (d. 1373/1953).

The text's relevance endures in modern times, with contemporary theologians like Sa'id Foudah endorsing it for ongoing study and promoting its teaching through structured online courses.

=== Abridgments and summaries ===
To enhance the work's clarity and accessibility for students and young learners, several scholars produced concise abridgments. Notable authors of these summaries include:

- Abu al-Hasan 'Ali al-Minufi (d. 939/1532).
- Abu al-Hasan 'Ali al-Nuri (d. 1118/1706).
- Khoja Mirza (Arabic: خوجه ميرزا), a Sunni scholar of Transoxianan origin. This summary was explained by the Hanafi-Sufi scholar Muhammad Hayat al-Sindi (d. 1163/1750), who was a teacher of Muhammad ibn 'Abd al-Wahhab, the founder of the Wahhabi movement.
- Omar Abdullah Kamel (d. 1436/2015).

== Translations ==
Umm al-Barahin has been translated into several different languages, including the following:

=== English ===
The creed has been translated into English by Walter James Skellie and published by Kennedy School of Missions of the Hartford Seminary Foundation in 1930 under the title of "A Translation of As Sanusi's Creed Umm Al Barahin, and a Comparison of it with the Creeds of Al Fadali and An Nasafi". It was also translated by Frederick J. Barny and published in two parts in The Muslim World. The first part appears in Vol. 23, No. 1 (Jan. 1933), pp. 46–55, and the second in Vol. 24, No. 1 (Jan. 1934), pp. 44–48.

=== French ===
Translated into French in 1896 by Jean-Dominique Luciani, titled "Petit Traite de Theologie Musulmane".

=== Fulfulde ===
Umm al-Barahin became the most respected and widely accepted creed in many parts of West Africa, especially among the Fulbe scholars, who even translated it into Fulfulde (Note: The language goes by multiple names, including Fula, Fulani, and Pular.) and considered memorizing it an essential duty for every devout Muslim.

=== German ===
Translated into German by Moritz Wolff (d. 1904), a pupil of the German Arabist and orientalist Heinrich Leberecht Fleischer (d. 1888), and this translation was published in Leipzig in 1848.

=== Indonesian ===
The work has been widely used for education in Javanese pesantrens, and translated into Indonesian by Mas Hasan Biqi Muhammad with the title of "Terjemah Syarah Ummul Barohin".

=== Italian ===
Translated into Italian by Giuseppe Gabrieli (d. 1942) and published in 1901 under the title "Un capitolo di teodicae musulmana ovrero gli attributi divini secondo la Umm al-barāhīn di as-Sunūsī".

=== Malay ===
In the development of Malay kitab literature, there were also certain texts or books that were translated several times by different translators. Umm al-Barahin, written by al-Sanusi (d. 1490) was first translated into Malay in 1757 by Muhammad Zain bin Jalaluddin with the title Bidayat al-Hidayah. In 1886, there was another translation by Muhammad Zainuddin bin Muhammad Badawi al-Sambawi with a new title – Siraj al-Huda. In 1890, a Muslim scholar from Patani, Zainal Abidin bin Muhammad al-Fatani finished translating the same book with the title 'Aqidat al-Najin. From this aspect, it can be concluded that the book Umm al-Barahin was a very popular and useful book. Apart from being translated a few times, this book was also mentioned by Munsyi Abdullah in his book Hikayat Abdullah as religious teaching material in Malacca during the 1820s. Another author, Raja Ali Haji, also mentioned it in his work Tuhfat al-Nafis, as this book was also used in the Riau Archipelago. — Siti Hawa Salleh, Malay Literature of the 19th Century

The term Sifat Dua Puluh (which means the Twenty Attributes of God) is a Malay concept used to teach core Sunni Islamic beliefs in Southeast Asia. This theological framework was developed in the 19th century by Malay scholars studying in Mecca who were influenced by al-Sanusi's seminal work, Umm al-Barahin. These scholars not only translated the source text but also wrote their own explanations and commentaries on it. They embedded the term Sifat Dua Puluh in their writings, which were part of the rich tradition of Kitab Jawi (Malay-language Islamic books in Arabic script). (Note: Kitab Jawi refers to religious texts written by traditional Malay Muslim scholars in the Jawi script, which is a modified form of the Arabic script used for writing the Malay language.) When these printed books were sent back to Southeast Asia, the doctrine of the Twenty Attributes spread widely. This played a pivotal role in establishing the Ash'ari-Maturidi school of Sunni theology as the dominant and orthodox creed in the region. (Note: It is worth mentioning that the influence of the Sanusi creed and similar texts on Tawhid had begun to reach the region earlier through manuscripts and oral transmission. However, the 19th century was indeed the golden age of its spread and its systematic establishment, due to the printing press.)

This theological impact was a direct result of the intensive study and translation of Umm al-Barahin by Malay scholars over more than a century. Ever since the middle of the eighteenth century it has received the attention of several Malay scholars. The first Malay translation of this creed was attempted by Muhammad Zain ibn Jalāl al-Din al-'Āshi in 1757 under the title Bidāyat al-Hidaya (The Beginning of Guidance). In 1817, another translation was done in Mecca by Dawud al-Fatani, entitled "Al-Durr al-Thamin fi 'Aqa'id al-Mu'minin" (The Precious Pearls on the Beliefs of the Believers).

Between 1885 and 1886 a third translation was done by Muhammad Zain al-Din ibn Muhammad Badawi al-Sambawi under the name Sirāj al-Hudā (The Lamp of Guidance). In 1890, a fourth translation was completed by Zain al-'Ābidin Muhammad al-Fatani entitled 'Aqīdat al-Nājīn fi 'Ilm Uṣūl al-Din (The Doctrine of the Saved Ones in the Science of the Fundamentals of Religion).

By the middle of the nineteenth century this text was used for teaching purposes in Malacca as acknowledged by Abdullah bin Abdul Kadir Munshi and in Penyengat on the island of Riau as noted by Raja Ali Haji. It has been translated also by 'Abd al-Qadir ibn 'Abd al-Rahman al-Fatani (d. 1315/1898) under the title Matn Umm al-Barahin.

In twentieth century, this work has become an accepted text for Islamic theology in many Islamic religious schools in Malaysia.

=== Russian ===
In 2012, the work has been translated into Russian by Abu Adam al-Naruiji (Russian: Абу Адам ан-Наруиджи) (Note: Al-Naruiji/al-Narwiji, or al-Norwiji (i.e. “The Norwegian”). He is a convert from Norway who teaches Ash'ari creed and Hanafi fiqh. He has a blog entitled 'Sunni Answers' where he discusses and criticizes anthropomorphism, atheism, and the Wahhabi-Salafi doctrine.) and published under the title «Акыда ас-Санусийя». This translation is approved by the Expert Council of the Spiritual Administration of Muslims of Dagestan.

Recently, it has been translated by Abu 'Ali al-Daghistani (Russian: Абу Али ад-Дагистани), and published by Darul-Fikr (Russian: Даруль-Фикр) under the title of «Базовые доказательства веры (умм аль-барахин)».

=== Serbian-Croatian-Bosnian ===
It has been translated, in part or in whole, into Serbo-Croatian in 2022 by Sami Džeko, titled "Ummu-L-Berahin".

== Reception and influence ==
=== In the Islamic world ===
Umm al-Barahin has received significant attention from both scholars and students alike, and has been widely taught at Sunni Islamic institutions across Africa (al-Qarawiyyin in Morocco and al-Zaytuna in Tunisia), the Middle East (Al-Azhar in Egypt), and Southeast Asia (Malaysia, Indonesia, and Borneo).

In the late 1500s, Ahmad Baba noted that he studied the al-Sughra (Umm al-Barahin) with his teacher, Bagayogo al-Wangari. For centuries, scholars from West Africa have commented on al-Sunusi's treatises, sometimes even using local African languages.

Since the 1600s, several of al-Sanusi's theological treatises have been translated and adapted into Fulfulde for teaching across West Africa. One major adaptation is known as Kabbe tawhidi, (Note: Kabbe is an Islamic theological teaching in Fulfulde inspired by the Umm al-Barahin of al-Sanusi.) which means "People of Tawhid" (referring to the oneness of God). Teachers used it to slowly introduce Fulfulde speakers to Islamic theology, following al-Sanusi's own step-by-step teaching method. Fulfulde religious leaders organized the lessons into three tiers: beginner, intermediate, and advanced. Later, the 17th-century Fulani scholar Muhammad al-Wali wrote an Arabic commentary that analyzed this Kabbe text, which itself was based on the al-Sughra.

Another version of al-Sanusi's theological treatise in Fulfulde is called Maddin, from the Arabic “What is Religion?” It began to be taught in Mali in the early 1900s. Like the Kabbe, its method is gradual, starts by teaching simple, basic Islamic beliefs and practical rituals, such as prayer and purification that most students can easily understand. It ends with complex, esoteric subjects, such as numerology, which are meant only for the most advanced students.

==== Scholarly appraisal ====
The work has been widely praised by Islamic scholars throughout history, including the following:

The most prominent figure to emphasize its importance was al-Sanusi himself. In his commentary on it, he described it as very useful and covering all the principles of monotheism (Tawhid). And he made it clear that no one turns away from it (i.e., avoids and abandons it) after realizing its true nature except those who are deprived (meaning of sound innate guidance). He also said it has no equal, is necessary for important scholarly circles, and is a leader among major creedal texts.

His student, al-Mallali, (Note: "Al-Mallali" (Arabic: المَلَّالي) is a name derived from or related to the city of Beni Mallal.) regarded it as "one of the most exalted doctrines, unparalleled in the creeds of earlier or later scholars."

Muhammad ibn 'Askar listed it among the best works ever written in Islam.

It was reported that 'Abd Allah al-Waryagli (or al-Ouaragli) (Note: "Al-Waryagli" or "al-Ouaragli" (Arabic: الورياجلي) is a name derived from or related to the city of Ouargla. "Warqala" and "Ouargla" are two common English spellings for the city name "ورقلة". Therefore, "al-Waryagli" or "al-Ouaragli" literally means "the one from Warqala/Ouargla".) said: "This speech could only have come from a purified heart," and he vowed to never be without it.

Muhammad Makhluf described it saying: "Nothing equals it among the creeds."

'Imran Musa bin 'Uqda al-Asari would often say – as reported by Muhammad ibn 'Askar – whenever theology was mentioned: "I have never seen anyone in this field like this man," meaning al-Sanusi.

=== In Western academia ===
The works of al-Sanusi (d. 895/1490), particularly his seminal creed Umm al-Barahin, have been a sustained subject of interest in Western academia throughout the 20th and 21st centuries. Scholarly engagement has evolved from broad theological analyses to focused studies on manuscript dissemination, pedagogical adaptation, and the text's resonance across diverse Islamic cultures.

The initial Western academic engagement with al-Sanusi's work situated it within the broader development of Islamic theology. In an early study, A. J. Wensinck (1932) analyzed the evolution of Islamic creed, focusing on al-Sanusi's role in the later systematization of Sunni theology. Wensinck identified Umm al-Barahin as representing the culmination of this systematic development in its mature stages.

This work was followed by more specialized in-depth studies. Joseph P. Kenny (1970), in his PhD thesis, provided a detailed examination of al-Sanusi's al-'Aqida al-Wusta (The Middle Creed). (Note: This thesis pertains specifically to the Middle Creed (al-'Aqida al-Wusta) and is not directly and exclusively related to the Small Creed (al-'Aqida al-Sughra), which is also known as the Mother of Proofs (Umm al-Barahin). Nevertheless, they are connected insofar as the Small Creed (al-'Aqida al-Sughra) is essentially an abridgment of the Middle Creed (al-'Aqida al-Wusta).) His analysis highlighted al-Sanusi's method of expounding the divine attributes and its alignment with core Ash'ari principles. Kenny's work is widely considered one of the first comprehensive Western studies to systematically address al-Sanusi's theology.

In recent decades, scholarly focus has expanded significantly beyond doctrinal analysis. There is a growing interest in the material history of the texts and their adaptation within local pedagogical contexts.

Caitlyn Olson (2020) argued in her work that al-Sanusi's creeds moved beyond Avicennian influences, offering a distinct theological approach that found resonance in regions like Southeast Asia.

Concurrently, scholars have traced the physical dissemination and localization of the text. For instance, Evgeniya Gutova (2011) analyzed a Kabyle Berber manuscript (MS KA 21) of al-Sanusi's creed from Algeria, demonstrating how Islamic theology was localized in North Africa through translation into the vernacular language and culture.

Similarly, Aglaia Iankovskaia (2024) explored this phenomenon in Southeast Asia, examining the use of interlinear translations in Sumatra. Her research illustrated how al-Sanusi's texts were vernacularized for classroom purposes, a practice that facilitated access to complex Arabic theological texts for non-native speakers.

== Gallery ==
=== Manuscripts ===
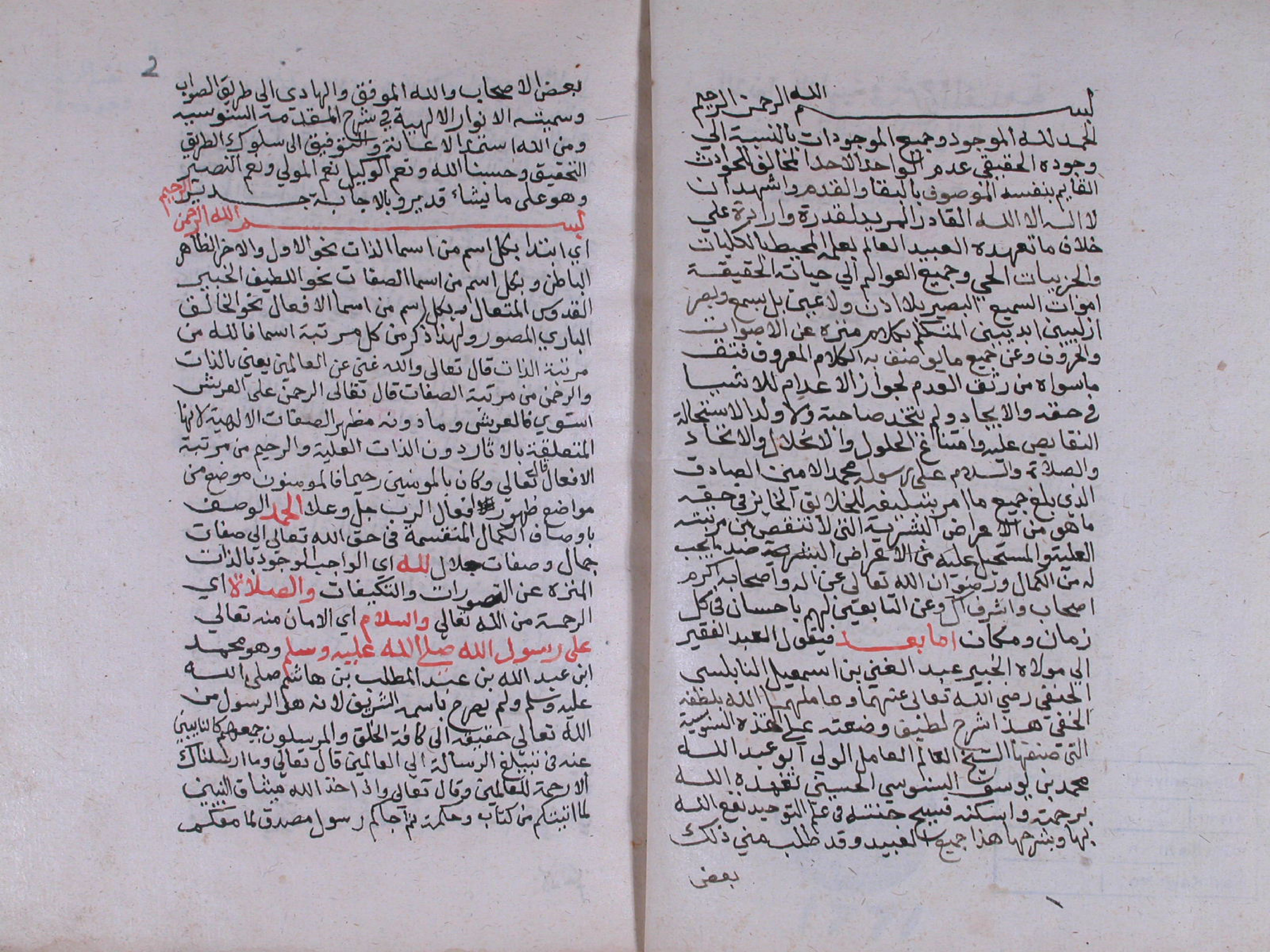
Al-Anwar al-Ilahiyya (Arabic: الأنوار الإلهية في شرح المقدمة السنوسية, lit. 'The Divine Lights on the Sanusi Creed') by 'Abd al-Ghani al-Nabulsi (d. 1143/1731)

== See also ==
- Al-Fiqh al-Akbar
- Al-Luma
- Al-'Aqida al-Tahawiyya
- Sharh al-'Aqa'id al-Nasafiyya
- Talkhis al-Adilla
- Al-Muhannad 'ala al-Mufannad
- Al-Risala al-Qushayriyya
- Jawharat al-Tawhid
- The Moderation in Belief
- A Guide to Conclusive Proofs
- Al-Insaf fima Yajib I'tiqaduh
- Al-Asma' wa al-Sifat
- Asas al-Taqdis
- Lubab al-Muhassal
- Daf' Shubah al-Tashbih
- Al-Murshid al-Mu'een
- The Essentials of the Islamic Faith
- List of Sunni books
