= Sa'id Foudah =

Jordanian Islamic scholar (born 1967)

- سعيد فودة
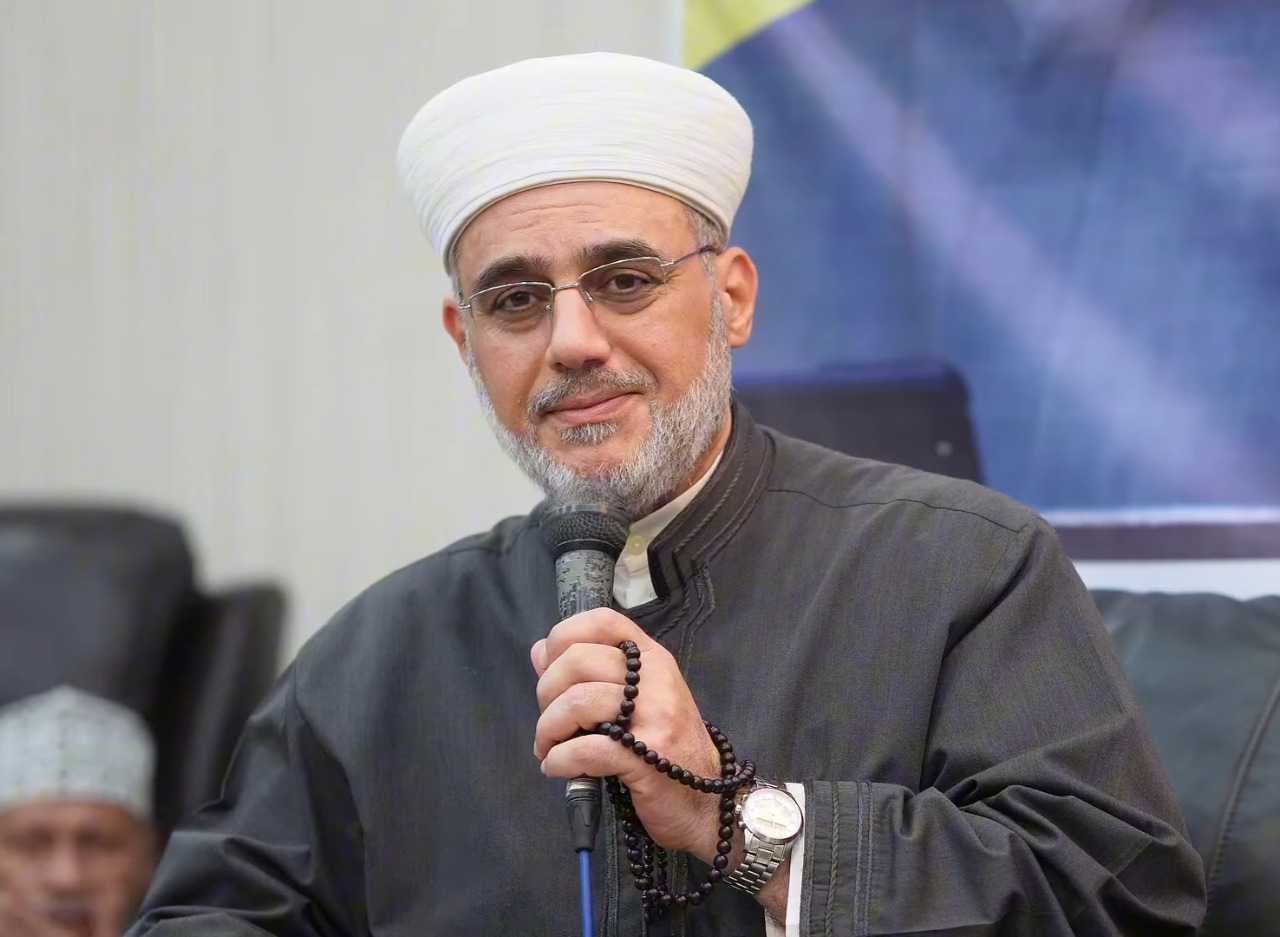

Personal life
- Born: 1967 (age 58–59)
- Main interest(s): 'Aqidah, Kalam, Logic
- Notable work: Al-Kashif al-Saghir 'An 'Aqa'id Ibn Taymiyya
- Education: University of Jordan, Jordan University of Science and Technology, World Islamic Sciences and Education University
- Website: saeedfodeh.org

Religious life
- Religion: Islam
- Denomination: Sunni
- Jurisprudence: Shafi'i
- Tariqa: Shadhili
- Creed: Ash'ari
- Profession: Professor and investigator (muhaqqiq)

Muslim leader
- Teacher: Nuh al-Qudah
- Influenced by: Al-Ash'ari, Fakhr al-Din al-Razi, Al-Kawthari, Al-Tahawi, Al-Baqillani, Al-Juwayni, Al-Ghazali, Al-Baydawi, Al-Shahrastani, Al-Taftazani, Al-'Izz b. 'Abd al-Salam, 'Ala' al-Din al-Bukhari, Baha' al-Din al-Ikhmimi, al-Sanusi, Ahmad al-Dardir, Mustafa Sabri
- Influenced: 'Abd al-Qadir Muhammad al-Husayn

Sa'id 'Abd al-Latif Foudah (Arabic: سعيد عبد اللطيف فودة; born 1967) is a Palestinian-Jordanian Shafi'i-Ash'ari scholar of Islamic theology (kalam), logic (mantiq), legal theory (usul al-fiqh), and the Chief Theology and Philosophy Adviser to the Imam al-Razi Chair at the King Hussein bin Talal Mosque in Amman, Jordan. He is best known for his criticism of the Wahhabi movement, Ibn Taymiyya (d. 728/1328) and his followers.

Sheikh Sa'id Foudah has had a significant influence in combating Salafi (or Taymi) creed. This is despite the fact that he grew up in an environment where criticising some Salafi scholars, such as Ibn Taymiyya or Ibn al-Qayyim, would lead to severe condemnation from the wider scholarly community. His book Al-Kashif al-Saghir sparked considerable controversy; however, it paved the way for others to openly critique Salafi beliefs.

He is also known for his refutations of the Sufi master Ibn Arabi (in particular, wahdat al-wujud) and Aristotelian or Avicennian philosophy.

== Birth ==
He was born in 1967 in the Jordanian town of al-Karameh, but his family originates from the village of Bayt Dajan in Palestine.

== Education ==
He holds bachelor's and master's degrees in 'aqidah (Islamic creed) from the University of Jordan, and a PhD from the World Islamic Sciences and Education University. He also has a bachelor's degree in electrical engineering from the Jordan University of Science and Technology and is fluent in Arabic, English, and Italian.

== Teachers ==
He was trained in the sciences of tafsir, tajwid, tasawwuf, and ilm al-kalam, under scholars throughout the Middle East, including Nuh al-Qudah, 'Ali Gum'a, Sa'id al-'Anbatawi, and Ahmad al-Jamal of the Shadhiliyya tariqa in Jordan, among many others.

== Views ==
In his commentary on the al-'Aqida al-Tahawiyya (the creed of al-Tahawi), he criticizes the Wahhabi scholar Ibn Baz (d. 1420/1999) for an erroneous critique of the “people of kalam.” Foudah asserts: “The sole intention of Ibn Baz... was to oppose the scholars of kalam, even if with falsehood.” Elsewhere in his commentary, Foudah asserts the vital importance of studying the articles of belief in Islam, stating: “'Aqidah is sought after for itself, not only because it is a condition for the validity of actions. Even if an action is not obligatory, 'aqidah is still necessary, for it is the foundation of everything.”

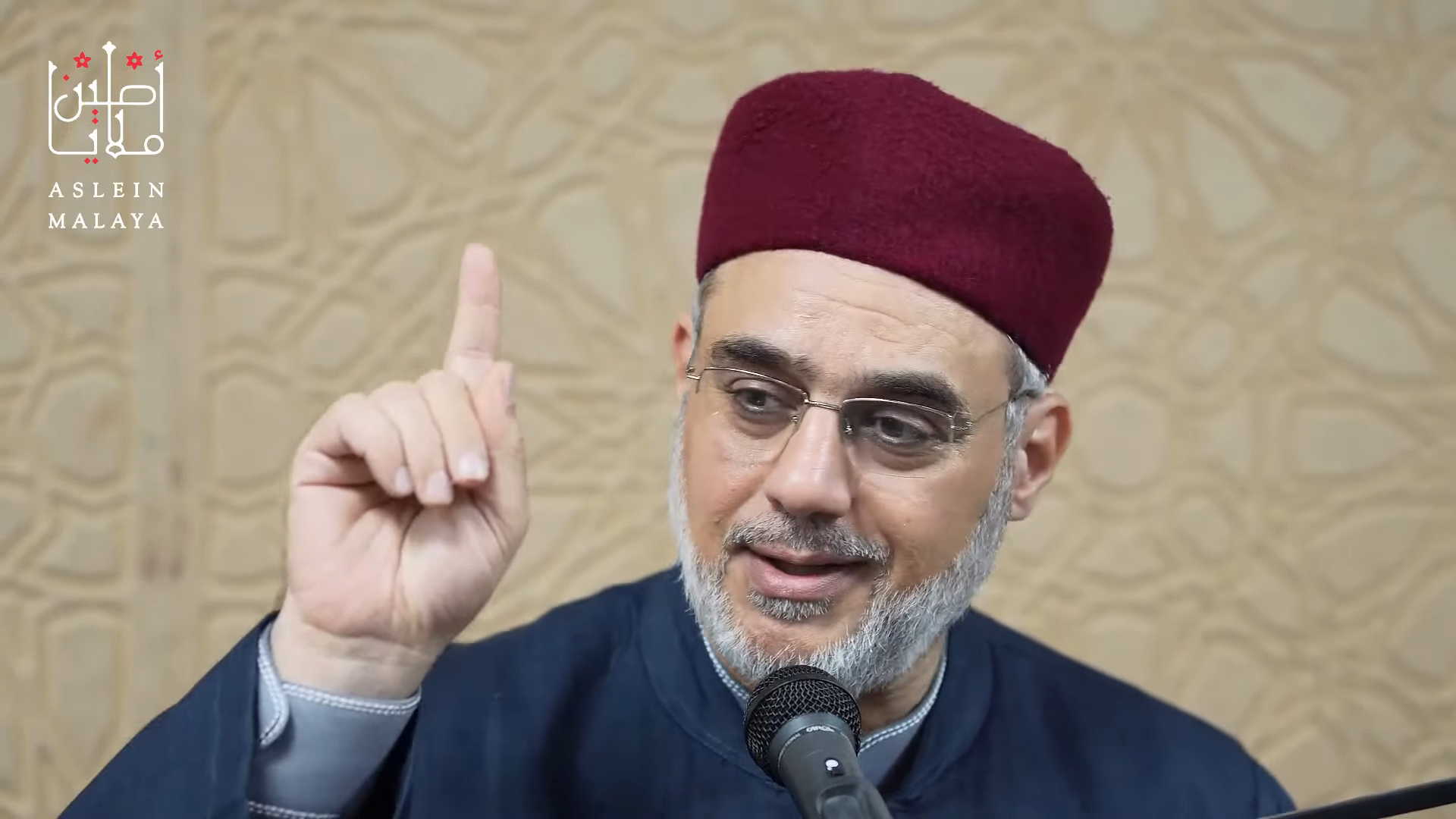
Sheikh Sa'id Foudah

In another treatise entitled “Critiquing A Critique,” Foudah refutes Ibn Taymiyya's claims that the study of logic is forbidden in Islam and defends Imam al-Ghazali's statement that logic is the basis of all sciences. In yet another treatise by Foudah, he responds to the infamous speech on the subject of faith and reason given by Pope Benedict XVI in September 2006. The Pope offended many in the Muslim world by repeating a quote by a medieval Christian scholar that referred to the teachings of the Islamic prophet Muhammad as “evil and inhumane” and being “spread by the sword.” Foudah devoted his treatise to the Pope's remarks regarding Islam's relationship with reason, stating: “The Pope wants to say that the view of the Church in regards to Allah is in conformity with reason, but the view of Muslims with regards to this is contrary to reason! These are words which cause in us shock, laughter and bewilderment.”

According to Jeffry R. Halverson, the Pope's narrow characterization of Islam's conception of God reflects only the Islam of the Atharis, and not at all the theological doctrines of the Ash'aris and Maturidis. This point is not lost on Foudah, who laments the demise of theology and other rational sciences that once flourished in the Islamic world, stating:

Such are the times that they dare say their (incorrect) view is (in keeping with) reason, and then claim that the Muslims contradict reason. By Allah, this shows the degree that the Muslims have deteriorated. This is a man of highest position in their (Catholic) group and he has dared utter something like this. If the people of Islam were grounded in the foundations of their knowledge, as were the previous scholars of Islam from the mutakallimin (theologians) and usuliyin [scholars who devoted themselves to the study of the principles of Islamic jurisprudence (usul al-fiqh)], they would never have dared say such about Islam.

In another treatise entitled “Modern Salafism and its Effect on Muslim Disunity,” Foudah notes the detrimental effects that Salafi thought has had on the Muslim world. He also recounts a series of systematic refutations or polemics against Salafi beliefs, writing:

Let us now take a moment to focus on Wahhabite thought, or Taymite thought (i.e. the followers of Ibn Taymiyya) as I sometimes like to call it. Their view-point can be summed up in the following: the Salaf were upon the true creed and their affair remained for a while. Afterwards their occurred a disconnection and the innovators from other sects became dominant, and that has continued unabated till today—barring the specific time periods in which certain callers to their doctrine appeared. The most important of these callers, according to the Wahhabis, are Ibn Taymiyya and his student Ibn Qayyim al-Jawziyya... [But what they mention to you] are disconnected and disparate individuals in separate times and places; and this, in my view, is one of the biggest proofs demonstrating the falsehood of their ideas, beliefs, and rulings in which they oppose Ahl al-Sunna wa al-Jama'a [i.e., Sunni Islam].

== Works ==
Tahdhib Sharh al-Sanusiyya by Sa'id Foudah

His books and treatises are numerous, most of them in the science of 'aqidah, kalam (Islamic scholastic theology), logic and in response to philosophers and secularists and to those who he considers as mubtadi'a (heretical innovators) such as Ibn Taymiyya and his followers, particularly the Wahhabi movement.

He has authored and edited over eighty books and articles on almost every topic of Islamic systematic theology. Among his notable publications are the following:

- Al-Sharh al-Kabir 'ala al-'Aqida al-Tahawiyya (Arabic: الشرح الكبير على العقيدة الطحاوية), a monumental and large commentary on al-'Aqida al-Tahawiyya in over 1450 pages and 2 volumes.
- Al-Kashif al-Saghir 'An 'Aqa'id Ibn Taymiyya (Arabic: الكاشف الصغير عن عقائد ابن تيمية), regarding the creed of Ibn Taymiyya, he demonstrated the anthropomorphism (Tajsīm) advocated by Ibn Taymiyya by referencing his own works, as well as other beliefs Ibn Taymiyya held, such as the concept of perpetual creation, divine complexity (the idea that God is composed parts), the notion of God being finite and limited in nature, etc. These ideas are widely regarded by Muslims as being a deviancy and contrary to the Qur'an and Sunnah. However, Wahhabis often attempt to deny or downplay these associations. He dedicated this work to Fakhr al-Din al-Razi (d. 606/1210) and Muhammad Zahid al-Kawthari (d. 1371/1951).
- Risala fi al-Radd 'ala Ibn Taymiyya (Arabic: رسالة في الرد على ابن تيمية في مسألة حوادث لا أول لها), commentary on the book of Baha' al-Din al-Ikhmimi, concerning Ibn Taymiyya's belief in infinite regress.
- Naqd al-Risala al-Tadmuriyya (Arabic: نقض الرسالة التدمرية, lit. 'A Critique of the Palmyran Creed: Deconstructing Ibn Taymiyya's Theology of Resemblance'), critique of Ibn Taymiyya's work on creed. Translated into English by Suraqah Abdul Aziz.
- Fatḥ al-Wadūd bi-Sharḥ Risālat al-Sharif al-Jurjani fi Wahdat al-Wujud (Arabic: فتح الودود بشرح رسالة الشريف الجرجاني في وحدة الوجود), a refutation of the teachings of Ibn 'Arabi as contained in the writings of al-Sharif al-Jurjani.
- Risalatan fi Wahdat al-Wujud (Arabic: رسالتان في وحدة الوجود), a refutation of the teachings of Ibn 'Arabi, which expands upon the refutation in "Fatḥ al-Wadūd".
- Munāqashāt wa Rudūd ma'a al-Shaykh 'Abd al-Ghanī al-Nābulsī (Arabic: مناقشات وردود مع الشيخ عبد الغني النابلسي), a refutation of the teachings of Ibn 'Arabi as found in the works of 'Abd al-Ghani al-Nabulsi, which further expands upon the refutation found in Foudah's previous anti-Ibn 'Arabi output.
- Tahdhib Sharh al-Sanusiyya (Arabic: تهذيب شرح السنوسية, lit. 'A Refined Explanation of the Sanusi Creed: The Foundational Proofs'), summary of the explanation of the creed of Muhammad ibn Yusuf al-Sanusi (d. 895/1490). (Note: Umm al-Barahin (Mother of Proofs) of al-Sanusi is one of the foundational works in Islamic theology. Further enhancing the value of this work is the relevant additions of Sa'id Foudah, who presents al-Sanusi's work with the interlineal commentary of Ahmad b. 'Isa al-Ansari and detailed footnotes collated from a variety of famous commentaries, such as those by al-Bajuri, al-Battawi, al-Sawi, al-Marghani, and others, as well as his own comments.) Translated into English by Suraqah Abdul Aziz.
- Tad'im al-Mantiq (Arabic: تدعيم المنطق, lit. 'The Reinforcing of Logic'), in support of the science of logic.
- Misbah al-Arwah fi Usul al-Din (Arabic: مصباح الأرواح في أصول الدين, lit. 'The Lamp of the Souls on the Principles of Religion'), (Note: Misbah al-Arwah (The Lamp of the Souls) is an abridged version of al-Baydawi's own book on theology titled Tawali' al-Anwār min Matali' al-Anzār (The Ascending Lights from Far Horizons of Logical Reasoning).) editing of al-Baydawi's work on scholastic theology.
- Muljimat al-Mujassima (Arabic: مُلجمة المجسمة, lit. 'Curbing the Anthropomorphists'), editing of 'Ala' al-Din al-Bukhari's work against Ibn Taymiyya.
- Masa'il al-Ikhtilaf bayna al-Asha'ira wa al-Maturidiyya (Arabic: مسائل الاختلاف بين الأشاعرة والماتريدية, lit. 'The Differences between the Ash'aris & Maturidis'), commentary on Ibn Kamal Pasha's work about the differences between the Ash'aris and the Maturidis in theology, in which Foudah succinctly explains the causes of the disagreements and their levels. Translated into English by Suraqah Abdul Aziz.

== See also ==
- List of Muslim theologians
- List of Ash'aris and Maturidis
- 2016 international conference on Sunni Islam in Grozny
