= Al-Kharida al-Bahiyya =

- Author: Ahmad al-Dardir
- Original title: الخريدة البهية
- Language: Arabic
- Subject: Islamic theology (Kalam)
- Genre: Ash'ari theology, Creed

Al-Kharida al-Bahiyya (Arabic: الخريدة البهية, romanized: al-Kharida al-Bahiyya, lit. 'The Radiant Pearl') is a didactic poem (arjuzah) authored by the 18th-century Maliki jurist and Ash'ari theologian Ahmad al-Dardir (d. 1201 AH / 1786 CE). It is a foundational text in Sunni theology, specifically within the Ash'ari school of creed (aqidah).

== Overview ==
The poem consists of 71 verses written in the rajaz meter, designed to facilitate the memorization of complex theological concepts. It outlines the necessary, possible, and impossible attributes of Allah and the Prophets. The text is widely taught in traditional Islamic institutions, including Al-Azhar University, as an introductory work for students of Kalam.

== Education and legacy ==
Al-Kharida al-Bahiyya has served as a primary pedagogical text for students of the Ash'ari school for over two centuries. It forms part of the traditional curriculum at Al-Azhar University in Cairo. The poem is valued for its use of the rajaz meter, which historically aided memorization of concise theological texts (matn).

== Commentaries ==
Due to its conciseness, many scholars have written commentaries (shuruh) on the poem:

- Sharh al-Kharida al-Bahiyya: The author's own commentary, providing detailed rational explanations.
- Hashiyat al-Sawi: A well-known super-commentary (hashiya) by Ahmad al-Sawi (d. 1241 AH).
- Hashiyat al-Muti'i: Written by Muhammad Bakhit al-Muti'i, a former Grand Mufti of Egypt.
- Mukhtasar Sharh al-Kharida: A contemporary abridgment by Sa'id Foudah.

== Contents ==
The work is divided into several thematic sections:

- Epistemology: The obligation of rational inquiry and types of legal rulings.
- Divinity (Ilahiyyat): The attributes of God, including Existence (Wujud), Oneness (Wahdaniyya), and Power (Qudra).
- Prophethood (Nubuwwat): The attributes of messengers, such as truthfulness and trustworthiness.
- Eschatology (Sam'iyyat): Matters of the afterlife, including resurrection and intercession.
- Sufism (Tasawwuf): A concluding section on spiritual purification and ethics.

== See also ==
- Al-Aqida al-Tahawiyya
- Umm al-Barahin
