= Al-Akhdari =

Arab writer and scientist

Sayyidi ʻAbd al-Raḥmān ibn Muḥammad Al-Akhdari
- سيدي عبد الرحمن بن محمد الأخضري

Personal life
- Born: 1515 Biskra
- Died: 1575 (aged 59–60)
- Home town: Biskra, Algeria
- Other name: Ibn Al-Akhdari

Religious life
- Religion: Sunni Islam
- Lineage: Dynasty of Al-Akhdari
- Profession: Ulama, astronomer, logician, poet, jurist

Sayyidi ʻAbd al-Raḥmān ibn Muḥammad al-Ṣaghīr ibn Muḥammad ibn Sayyidi ʿĀmir al-Akẖḍarī al-Bīsīkrī (Arabic: سيدي عبد الرحمن بن محمد الصغير بن محمد بن سيدي عمرو الأخضري; 1512–1575), better known as Al-Akẖḍari (Arabic: الأخضري), was an Algerian poet, logician, astronomer and Maliki jurist.

He was the author of the highly popular didactic poem "Al-Sullam al-murawnaq fī ʻilm al-manṭiq" ("The Ornamented Ladder into the Science of Logic"). The 144-line poem, a versification of Al-Abhari's Kitab al-Isaghuji, outlines the principles of Islamic logic and explains how logic could be used to support the Islamic creed ('aqidah) and jurisprudence (fiqh). The work is studied across the Muslim world as a primer on logic and is often read in conjunction with al-Akhdari's own prose commentary.

He is also known to have written another work, "al-Jawhar ul-Maknun" or "Al-Jawahir al-Maknuna fi'l-ma'ni wa'l-bayan wa'l-badi".

== Origin ==
Al-Akẖḍarī was born in Biskra in present-day Algeria, plus an account in an Sherifian Arab family (noble descendant) of the Arab tribe Banu al-Akhdari (Arabic: بنو الأخضري) the region of Ibb in Yemen present in Algeria since the 680s, best known in Morocco, Algeria and Libya as Kābilāt Al-Akḥdārīyyāh (Arabic: قبيلة الأخضرية).

== Works ==
Al-Akhdari wrote many works on several sciences including intellectual, Shari'a, fiqh, linguistics, mathematics, and astronomy.

- Al-Sullam al-munawraq fī ʻilm al-manṭiq ("The Ornamented Ladder into the Science of Logic"; Arabic: السلم المُنَوْرَقِ في علم المنطق): a 144-line poem on Islamic logic. This work was translated by the French orientalist Lucien in 1921 CE and he considered it one of the greatest international books.
- «مختصر الأخضري في العبادات» على مذهب الإمام مالك
- «نظم الجوهر المكنون في ثلاثة فنون: في علم البلاغة والبيان والبديع»
- «حلية اللب المصون على الجواهر المكنون»
- «منظومة الدرة البيضاء في الفرائض والحساب»
- «منظومة الدرة البيضاء في أحسن الفنون والأشياء»
- «نظم السلم المرونق في المنطق»
- «شرح السلم المرونق المذكور»
- «نظم السراج في علم الفلك»
- «نظم منثور ابن آجروم الدرر البهية على نظم الاجرومية»
- «نظم أزهر المطالب في هيئة الأفلاك والكواكب في علم الاسطرلاب»
- «قصيدة مدح النبي خالد بن سنان»
- «شعر القدسية واللامية في التصوف»

== See also ==
- List of Ash'aris and Maturidis
