= Muhammad ibn Yusuf al-Sanusi =

15th-century Islamic theologian

Imam Muhammad ibn Yusuf al-Sanusi
- محمد بن يوسف السنوسي
- Title: Nāṣir al-Sunnah; Muḥyī al-Dīn

Personal life
- Born: 1426 Tlemcen
- Died: 1490 (aged 63–64) Tlemcen
- Era: Tlemcen Kingdom period
- Region: Maghreb
- Main interest(s): Islamic jurisprudence, Islamic theology, Tafsir, Hadith, Arabic grammar, Qur'anic recitation, Medicine, Astronomy, Algebra, Logic
- Notable work: Umm al-Barahin
- Occupation: Scholar, Jurist, Theologian, Mufti, Logician

Religious life
- Religion: Islam
- Denomination: Sunni
- Jurisprudence: Maliki
- Creed: Ash'ari

Muslim leader
- Influenced by: Malik Ibn Anas Abu Hasan al-Ash'ari Al-Baqillani Al-Juwayni Al-Ghazali Adud al-Din al-Iji Abdul-Rahman al-Tha'alibi Abu'l-Hasan ibn Ali al-Qalasadi Ibn 'Arafa
- Influenced: Al-Maghili Ahmad Zarruq Ahmad ibn Abi Jum'ah

Muhammad ibn Yusuf al-Sanusi (Arabic: محمد بن يوسف السنوسي; (Note: full name: Muḥammad bin Abī Yaʿqūb Yūsuf bin ʿUmar bin Shuʿayb, Abū ʿAbd Allāh al-Sanūsī; Arabic: محمد بن أبي يعقوب يوسف بن عمر بن شعيب، أبو عبد الله السنوسي) 895–830 AH/ 1426–1490 AD) was a Maghribi Sunni polymath from what is now Algeria. He was an Ash'arī theologian, Mālikī jurist, Sufi saint and mufti centred in Tlemcen. He is best known for his foundational contributions to Islamic creed ('aqīdah) and theology (kalām), with his works being highly regarded in Sunni Islam, particularly within the Ash'ari tradition. Imam Muhammad ibn Yusuf al-Sanusi is widely credited with systematizing and popularizing an accessible, rationally argued presentation of Sunni kalām, thereby safeguarding orthodox creed against heterodox influences and countering the claims of pseudo-Sufi figures who promoted innovations and spurious forms of asceticism.

== Political and intellectual climate ==
Tlemcen, the capital of the Zayyanid state, endured significant political and social upheaval during the ninth century AH/fifteenth century CE. This instability stemmed from both external and internal pressures, notably the interference of the Hafsids and Marinids, which contributed to political fragmentation and insecurity. Feudal tendencies also emerged, fuelled by the ambitions of sultans and emirs, whose alliances with tribal leaders deepened social disintegration and hindered economic productivity. These adverse conditions had a profound impact on intellectual life, which declined into stagnation and was increasingly marked by ignorance, superstition, and sorcery. The spread of Sufism in the Maghreb further encouraged tendencies toward withdrawal and asceticism, with many followers adhering uncritically to their sheikhs, thereby fostering an atmosphere dominated by distorted beliefs and practices. In response, scholars emphasized the need to guide society toward sound faith and knowledge. Among the most prominent of these figures was the eminent Tlemceni scholar, Imam Muhammad ibn Yusuf al-Sanusi, who dedicated himself to enlightening the people, promoting sound doctrine, and advancing Sunni mysticism. His efforts played a central role in defending monotheism and reviving intellectual and spiritual life in both Tlemcen and the wider Maghreb.

== Family origins and lineage ==
Although born, raised, and died in Tlemcen, his family origins trace back to the Bani Sanus.

Beyond this tribal origin, his genealogical lineage is well-documented, reaching to al-Hasan, the son of 'Ali ibn Abi Talib and Fatima, the daughter of the Islamic prophet Muhammad, thereby connecting him to the Ahl al-Bayt (Muhammad's household).

== Early life ==
=== Birth ===
Al-Sanūsī was born in Tlemcen, the capital of the Kingdom of Tlemcen. Sources disagree on his exact birth year: some modern summaries give 832 AH/1428 CE, while internal reports from his circle imply a birth around 838–839 AH based on an age statement recorded near the end of his life. However, most sources agree he was born in 830 AH/1426 AD.

=== Education ===
He grew up in a religious household, his father being his first teacher and studied a broad curriculum: Arabic sciences, Mālikī law, Hadith, tafsir, kalām, arithmetic, astronomy/astrolabe, logic, and Sufism. He combined formal scholarly study with Sufi training, which shaped both his ethics and his later program of doctrinal reform.

=== Teachers ===
Al-Sanūsī's named teachers include:

- Abū Yaʿqūb Yūsuf, his father.
- Abū Naṣr al-Zawwāwī, a disciple of Ibn Marzūq al-Ḥafīd.
- Muḥammad b. al-Qāsim b. Tunzāt (Tumart), a scholar in obligatory acts and arithmetic.
- Al-Qalaṣādī, the mathematician who licensed his transmissions.
- Al-Ḥabbāk, a scholar in astrolabe.
- Abū al-Ḥasan ʿAlī b. Muḥammad al-Ṭalūtī al-Anṣārī, his maternal brother.
- Abū Zayd ʿAbd al-Raḥmān al-Thaʿālibī, who taught him Hadith including Ṣaḥīḥ al-Bukhārī and Ṣaḥīḥ Muslim.
- Al-Kanabshī, who taught him al-Irshād
- Al-Jallāb (fiqh)
- Ibrahim al-Tazi, a Sufi trainer, (khirqa).

== Scholarly life ==
=== Scholarly terrain ===
Beyond theology, al-Sanusi was a prolific author in an array of disciplines, demonstrating his encyclopedic knowledge. His scholarly output also encompassed Tafsir (Qur'anic exegesis), Qira'at (Qur'anic recitations), Hadith (Prophetic traditions), Nahw (Arabic grammar and syntax), as well as the secular (Note: The term "secular" here is used in its academic sense to mean "non-religious" or "worldly," distinguishing sciences based on reason and observation (like medicine and astronomy) from religious sciences (like theology and law). It does not imply adherence to the modern political ideology of secularism.) fields of medicine, astronomy, algebra and logic.

=== Career ===
Settled in Tlemcen, al-Sanūsī taught extensively in his mosque and home served all levels of students where he issued legal opinions as a Mālikī mufti, defending and clarifying the school's positions (including work on the Mudawwana). He emphasized pedagogy (even arguing against corporal punishment of boys) and set conditions for teachers, notably mastery of Arabic. In fatwā and writing he practiced facilitation where texts allowed, aiming to meet ordinary learners at their level.

Doctrinally, he renewed Asharī kalām for his time: insisting on rational demonstration grounded in Quran and Sunnah, warning beginners against heavily philosophical syntheses, and composing graded creeds (major, middle, minor) to make doctrine both teachable and testable by proof. He coupled this with a Sufi ethic—self-purification, sincerity, humility, and a campaign against popular superstition and counterfeit asceticism then circulating in parts of the Maghrib.

=== Students ===
Noted pupils include:

- Abū ʿAbd Allāh Muḥammad b. ʿUmar al-Malālī al-Tilimsānī (companion for ~35 years; author of al-Mawāhib al-Qudsiyya fī Manāqib al-Sanūsiyya)
- Ibn Jīda al-Wahrānī (d. 951 AH)
- Muḥammad al-Maghīlī (d. 909 AH)
- Muḥammad b. Yaḥyā al-Madiyūnī
- Belqāsim b. Muḥammad al-Zawwāwī (d. 922 AH)
- Muḥammad al-Qalʿī, Aḥmad Zarq al-Baransī (d. 899 AH)
- Aḥmad b. ʿĪsā al-Wārindī
- Abū ʿAbd Allāh al-ʿAbbās al-Tilimsānī
- Muhammad al-Hawdi

== Death ==
Al-Sanūsī died on Sunday, 18 Jumādā II 895 AH (corresponds to 2 May 1490 AD) in Tlemcen, after an illness of roughly ten days, and was buried beside his brother ʿAlī al-Ṭalūtī in the lower ʿAbād cemetery, as reported by his student al-Malālī.

== Legacy ==
Later Maghribi scholars consider al-Sanūsī a Mujaddid and credit him for “renewing” the religion at the head of his century by simplifying and systematizing Ashʿarī creed, multiplying concise manuals and commentaries, and combating blind imitation. His creeds drew extensive commentaries, super-commentaries, and translations across the Islamic world. He advocated a Sunni, ethical Sufism (ihsān, mujahada, remembrance) while opposing superstition, arguing that doctrinal clarity and moral refinement must reinforce each other.

The legacy of al-Sanusi's works was sustained and revived for centuries across Middle East, North, West, and East Africa through a continuous tradition of commentaries, poems, and glosses, ensuring their dominance in African Islamic scholarship. Furthermore, their profound influence extended beyond the continent, reaching as far as Southeast Asia.

=== Educational methodology ===
Al-Sanusi not only authored core texts but also composed his own commentaries on them. By producing both components, he ensured the main text remained concise and clear, while the commentary provided students with the necessary context and detailed explanations. He meticulously designed these works as an integrated curriculum for learning. They start with simple, basic ideas and slowly move to more complicated ones. This step-by-step method shows that al-Sanusi focused on making difficult topics clear and easy to understand at every level of learning. Particularly notable among these works is Umm al-Barahin, a text of enduring significance within the Islamic tradition, as evidenced by the extensive study it has received over centuries and the many commentaries (and even later super-commentaries) it has inspired. Designed to succinctly and accessibly present core theological principles, its precise language and logical structure aim not only to safeguard but also to fortify the beliefs of Muslims—both commoners and scholars—against anthropomorphism and deviant philosophical doctrines.

== Works ==
Al-Sanūsī wrote across theology, law, hadith, tafsīr, logic, language, and even medicine. Highlights include:

=== Theology (ʿAqīda / Kalām) ===
- Al-'Aqida al-Kubra ("The Major/Advanced Creed"), also known as Aqīdat Ahl al-Tawḥīd.
- ʿUmdat Ahl al-Tawfīq ("The Mainstay of the People of Divine Success"), also known as al-ʿUmda, is a commentary for the above.
- Al-'Aqida al-Wusta ("The Intermediate Creed").
- Sharḥ al-ʿAqīda al-Wusṭā ("Commentary on the Intermediate Creed"), a commentary for above.
- Al-'Aqida al-Sughra ("The Lesser/Concise Creed"), which is also often referred to as Umm al-Barahin ("The Mother of Evidences"). This became his most famous primer, circulating widely with glosses and translations.
- Sughra al-Sughra ("The Most Concise Creed") also known as (al-Bint, i.e. the Daughter).
- Sughra Sughra al-Sughra (also known as al-Hafida, i.e. the Granddaughter).
- Al-Mufida ("The Beneficial").
- Al-Muqaddimat ("The Preludes/Preliminaries"). (Note: “Al-Muqaddimat” is a primer and seminal work by al-Sanusi, serving as an introduction to the study of Islamic theology. Several translations of this work are available online, including: The Muqaddimah: An Introductory Summary of Kalâm, translated by Joseph Kenny, O.P., published in Hamdard Islamicus, 23:2 (April-June 2000), 31-40.; The Preludes of Imam al-Sanusi, translated by Shams Tameez.)
- Sharh al-Asmā' al-Husna ("Exposition of the Most Beautiful Divine Names").
- A commentary on the al-'Aqida al-Murshida ("the Guiding Creed") by Ibn Tumart.
- A commentary on Jawahir al-'Ulūm ("the Gems of Sciences"), better known as Jawahir al-Kalam ("the Gems of Kalam") by 'Adud al-Din al-'Iji.
- al-Manhaj al-Sadīd fī Sharḥ Kifāyat al-Murīd ("The Sound Method in Commentary on Kifāyat al-Murīd"), a commentary on a theological poem on Kifayat al-Murid by his teacher Ahmad al-Zawawi.

=== Tafsīr ===
- Tafsīr Sūrat al-Fātiḥa
- Fawātiḥ Sūrat al-Baqarah
- Hawāshī on al-Zamakhsharī's commentary al-Kashshāf.

=== Ḥadīth ===
- Abridged commentary on Ṣaḥīḥ Muslim
- Materials on Ṣaḥīḥ al-Bukhārī and its problematic passages
- A Sīrah epitome from al-Suhaylī's al-Rawḍ al-Unuf

=== Fiqh and Uṣūl ===
- A commentary on the Mudawwana
- A compendium of fiqh rulings
- Summary in uṣūl al-fiqh
- A commentary on al-Waghlīsiyya

=== Logic and Arabic grammar ===
- Commentary on the (Isagoge)
- Commentary on the Ajurrūmiyya

=== Medicine ===
- Commentary on Ibn Sīnā's medical poem entitled Al-Urjuzah Fi Al-Tibb

== See also ==
- List of Ash'aris
- List of Muslim theologians
