= Al-Fiqh al-Akbar =

Book by Imam Abu Hanifa

- English translation cover
- Author: Abu Hanifa
- Translator: Abdur-Rahman Ibn Yusuf (English)
- Language: Arabic
- Subject: Creation History, understanding of the creator & messengers, the hereafter
- Publisher: White Thread Press, USA.
- Publication date: June 2007
- Media type: Print (Hardcover)
- Pages: 240
- ISBN: 978-1-933764-03-0

Al-Fiqh al-Akbar (Arabic: الفقه الأكبر) or "The Greater Knowledge" is a popular early Islamic text attributed to the Muslim jurist Abu Hanifa. It is one of the few surviving works of Abu Hanifa. It outlines the foundational articles of the Sunni faith whilst refuting the beliefs of those groups that were considered to be outside orthodox or mainstream Islam, namely the Muʿtazila, Qadariyah and Khawarij amongst others. It describes the Sunni policy for dealing with the ambiguous Attributes of Allah and delves in detail into how the Qur'an is the eternal speech of Allah .

Two other well known creeds sharing the name were Fiqh Akbar II another book about Sunni faith ascribed to Abu Hanifa (renamed as "al-Fiqh al-Absat", to avoid mixing them up), and Fiqh Akbar III, "representative" of the Shafi'i.

== Content ==
The text begins by outlining the foundational articles of faith, and goes on to discuss the eternal essence (dhat) of Allah, His names and attributes, and the Qur'an as His eternal speech. Thereafter, it elaborates on how one acquires true faith (iman) or enters into a state of unbelief (kufr) after coming into this world. The subject of prophets and messengers is also taken up in some detail, followed by a discussion on the Four Rightly-guided Caliphs and other Companions, and what the attitude of believers should be toward them.

In refuting its theological adversaries—the Muʿtazila, the Kharajites, and others—the text argues that the believer does not leave Islam by committing sins. A discussion of the miracles bestowed by Allah on His various servants is presented, followed by an in-depth analysis of iman (true faith) and Islam (submission) and the extent to which a person's faith increases and decreases. Other issues raised in the text include the generosity and justice of Allah in dealing with His servants, the Ascension (Mi'raj) of Muhammad; and eschatological issues, such as the questioning in the grave, Gog and Magog and other awaited signs of the Last Day. Although the author follows a particular order in the text, he sometimes repeats certain points already mentioned for emphasis; for instance, because of the Qur'an's weighty importance, he asserts several times that the eternal speech of Allah is unlike the created words of human beings.

== Reception & Legacy ==
Al-Fiqh al-Akbar is popular throughout the Muslim world and especially in and around the Indian Sub Continent. Among Hanafis it is considered essential for anyone wanting to study Islamic theology and philosophy. It has been cited by many Muslims and Islamic scholars from around the world since its authorship.

== Translations & Commentaries ==
There have been many commentaries written on Al Fiqh Al Akbar including by Maghnisawi, Ali al-Qari and Abu 'l-Layth al-Samarqandi. In 2007, Abdur-Rahman Ibn Yusuf released a new English translation of this text, Al-Fiqh al-Akbar Explained.

== Fiqh Akbar II ==
According to Alfred Guillaume, an Aqidah known as Fiqh Akbar II was compiled around 1000 CE and is made up of 29 articles. It is "based largely" on the teachings of Abu al-Hasan al-Ash'ari (874–936 CE). Guillaume considers it prominent enough to be "singled out" for special attention over other Aqidah. Some of Guillaume's summary of it goes:

Allah is absolute in his decrees of good and evil. He does not resemble his creatures in any respect. He has existed from eternity with ll his qualities, those belonging to his essence and those pertaining to his activity. The Quran is the speech of Allah written in books, preserved in memories, recited by tongues, revealed to the Prophet. ... The speech of God is uncreate, the speech of Moses and others is created. We speak with organs of speech and letters; God speaks without instruments and letters. ... God has face, hand and soul, but it is not legitimate to inquire how, for these belong to his qualities; God has no body. ...

== See also ==
- Al-'Aqida al-Tahawiyya
- Kitab al-Tawhid
- Sharh al-'Aqa'id al-Nasafiyya
- List of Sunni books
