= The Essentials of the Islamic Faith =

Book by Fethullah Gülen

- Author: Fethullah Gülen
- Audio read by: Lee Crooks
- Original title: İnancın Gölgesinde
- Translator: Ali Ünal
- Subject: Islamic theology
- Publisher: Tughra Books
- Pages: 270
- ISBN: 9781932099850
- Website: Essentials of the Islamic Faith

The Essentials of the Islamic Faith is a theological book written by M. Fethullah Gülen, in which he explains the basic foundations of Islamic belief that are obligatory for Muslims to know.

The work takes up matters related to creation and causality, eschatology, the resurrection of the body, the unseen world of angels, jinn and Satan, and it concludes with a study of prophethood (nubuwwat), the prophethood of Muhammad, and the question of science and religion in relation to the study of the Qur'an.

== Content ==
The work is divided into six thematic chapters, as follows:

1. The Existence and Unity of God.
2. The Invisible Realm of Existence.
3. Divine Decree and Destiny, and Human Free Will.
4. The Resurrection and the Afterlife.
5. Prophethood and Muhammad's Prophethood.
6. The Holy Qur'an.

== Editions and translations ==
=== Turkish ===
Originally published in Turkish as İnancın Gölgesinde (lit. 'In the Shadow of Faith') by Nil Yayınları in 1991.

=== English ===
First edition in English translated by Ali Ünal, and published in 2000.

=== Russian ===
The work was translated into Russian by Farid Bagirov, and published in 2006 under the title Жизнь И Исламская Вера.

=== Spanish ===
The work was translated into Spanish in 2007 by Esteban E. Loustaunou under the title Fundamentos de la fe Islámica.

== See also ==
- List of Sunni books
