= Ahmad al-Dardir =

18th-century Islamic jurist

Ahmad ibn Muhammad al-Dardir
- Title: al-Dardir

Personal life
- Born: 1715 CE (1127 AH)
- Died: 27 Dec 1786 CE (1204 AH)
- Era: Ottoman Era
- Main interest(s): Fiqh, Aqeedah, Kalam and Sufism
- Notable work: al-Sharh al-Kabir

Religious life
- Religion: Islam
- Denomination: Sunni
- Jurisprudence: Maliki
- Tariqa: Khalwati
- Creed: Ash'ari

Ahmad ibn Muhammad ibn Ahmad al-Dardir (1715 – 1786 CE) (AH 1127 – 1204 AH ) known as Imam al-Dardir or Dardir was a prominent late jurist in the Maliki school from Egypt.

His Sharh as-Saghir and Sharh al-Kabir are two of the most important books of fatwa (Islamic legal rulings) in the Maliki school. His al-Kharida al-Bahiyya ("The Radiant Pearl") is a widespread primer on Ash'ari aqida.

== Biography ==
=== Early life and education ===
Ahmad ibn Muhammad ibn Ahmad ibn Abi Hamid al-Umari al-Maliki al-Azhari al-Khalwati was born in 1715 (1127 AH) in the village of Bani Adi in Asyut, Upper Egypt. He belonged to the al-Umari branch of the Quraysh tribe, tracing his lineage back to the second Caliph, Umar ibn al-Khattab. He was nicknamed "al-Dardir" after a pious Arab scholar who had settled in his village.

He moved to Cairo to study at Al-Azhar University, where he memorized the Quran and excelled in religious sciences. He studied under several renowned scholars, most notably:

- Ali al-Sa'idi al-Adawi: From whom he mastered Maliki jurisprudence.
- Shams al-Din Muhammad ibn Salim al-Hifni: Grand Shaykh of al-Azhar, who initiated him into the Khalwati order of Sufism.
- Sheikh al-Malawi and Sheikh al-Jawhari.

=== Career and character ===
Al-Dardir eventually became the head of the Maliki scholars at Al-Azhar and the supervisor of the Upper Egyptian students' quarters (Riwat al-Sa'ayida). He was known for his asceticism and his firm stance against injustice.

A famous anecdote regarding his character involves a visit from an Ottoman governor. When the governor entered Al-Azhar, al-Dardir remained seated, continuing his recitations without standing for the official. When the governor later sent him a bag of money as a gift, al-Dardir refused it, famously stating: "Tell your master, he who stretches out his legs [in prayer] does not stretch out his hand [for money]."

== Works ==
Al-Dardir authored numerous influential works in the fields of law, theology, and spirituality:

- Aqrab al-Masalik limadhhab al-Imam Malik: A primary manual of Maliki jurisprudence that remains a standard textbook.
- Al-Sharh al-Saghir: His own commentary on Aqrab al-Masalik, widely used for issuing legal rulings (fatwas).
- Al-Kharida al-Bahiyya: A celebrated didactic poem on Ash'ari creed (theology).
- Sharh Mukhtasar Khalil: A commentary on the foundational Maliki text by Khalil ibn Ishaq al-Jundi.
- Tuhfat al-Ikhwan: A treatise on the etiquette and practices of Sufism.
- Risala fi al-Mawlid al-Nabawi: A work regarding the celebration of the Prophet Muhammad's birth.
- La croyance en islam, September 2025, Editions i, ISBN 978-2-37650-189-3

== Death ==
Al-Dardir died on 27 December 1786 (6 Rabi' al-Awwal 1201 AH). His funeral was held at Al-Azhar Mosque, attended by a vast multitude of students and scholars. He was buried in the mosque complex he established in Cairo, which still bears his name today.

== See also ==
- List of Ash'aris and Maturidis
- List of Muslim theologians
- List of Islamic scholars
