= Logic in Islamic philosophy =

Early Islamic law placed importance on formulating standards of argument, which gave rise to a "novel approach to logic" (Arabic: منطق manṭiq "speech, eloquence") in Kalam (Islamic scholasticism). However, with the rise of the Mu'tazili philosophers, who highly valued Aristotle's Organon, this approach was displaced by the older ideas from Hellenistic philosophy. The works of al-Farabi, Avicenna, al-Ghazali and other Muslim logicians who often criticized and corrected Aristotelian logic and introduced their own forms of logic, also played a central role in the subsequent development of European logic during the Renaissance. Scholars who have studied Islamic logic include Nicholas Rescher, who in a 1964 work contextualized some 170 Arabic-language logicians, without the book being exhaustive. There have been hundreds of original treatises in the subject as well thousands of later commentaries or supra-commentaries.

According to the Routledge Encyclopedia of Philosophy:

"For the Islamic philosophers, logic included not only the study of formal patterns of inference and their validity but also elements of the philosophy of language and even of epistemology and metaphysics. Because of territorial disputes with the Arabic grammarians, Islamic philosophers were very interested in working out the relationship between logic and language, and they devoted much discussion to the question of the subject matter and aims of logic in relation to reasoning and speech. In the area of formal logical analysis, they elaborated upon the theory of terms, propositions and syllogisms as formulated in Aristotle's Categories, De interpretatione and Prior Analytics. In the spirit of Aristotle, they considered the syllogism to be the form to which all rational argumentation could be reduced, and they regarded syllogistic theory as the focal point of logic. Even poetics was considered as a syllogistic art in some fashion by most of the major Islamic Aristotelians."

Important developments made by Muslim logicians included the development of "Avicennian logic" as a replacement of Aristotelian logic. Avicenna's system of logic was responsible for the introduction of hypothetical syllogism, temporal modal logic and inductive logic. Other important developments in early Islamic philosophy include the development of a strict science of citation, the isnad or "backing", and the development of a scientific method of open inquiry to disprove claims, the ijtihad, which could be generally applied to many types of questions.

== Islamic law and theology ==
Early forms of analogical reasoning, inductive reasoning and categorical syllogism were introduced in Fiqh (Islamic jurisprudence), Sharia (Islamic law) and Kalam (Islamic theology) from the 7th century with the process of Qiyas, before the Arabic translations of Aristotle's works. Later during the Islamic Golden Age, there was a logical debate among Islamic philosophers, logicians and theologians over whether the term Qiyas refers to analogical reasoning, inductive reasoning or categorical syllogism. Some Islamic scholars argued that Qiyas refers to inductive reasoning, which Ibn Hazm (994-1064) disagreed with, arguing that Qiyas does not refer to inductive reasoning, but refers to categorical syllogism in a real sense and analogical reasoning in a metaphorical sense. On the other hand, al-Ghazali (1058–1111) and Ibn Qudamah al-Maqdisi (1147-1223) argued that Qiyas refers to analogical reasoning in a real sense and categorical syllogism in a metaphorical sense. Other Islamic scholars at the time, however, argued that the term Qiyas refers to both analogical reasoning and categorical syllogism in a real sense.

== Aristotelian logic ==
The first original Arabic writings on logic were produced by al-Kindi (Alkindus) (805–873), who produced a summary on earlier logic up to his time. The first writings on logic with non-Aristotelian elements was produced by al-Farabi (Alfarabi) (873–950), who discussed the topics of future contingents, the number and relation of the categories, the relation between logic and grammar, and non-Aristotelian forms of inference. He is also credited for categorizing logic into two separate groups, the first being "idea" and the second being "proof".

Averroes (1126–98) was the last major logician from al-Andalus, who wrote the most elaborate commentaries on Aristotelian logic.

== Avicennian logic ==
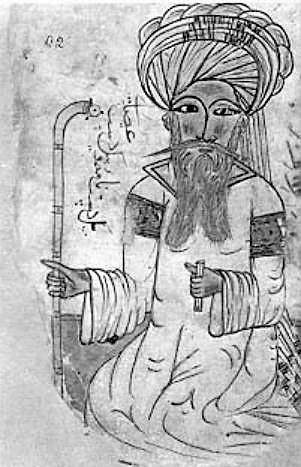
A drawing of Avicenna from 1271

Avicenna (980–1037) developed his own system of logic known as "Avicennian logic" as an alternative to Aristotelian logic. By the 12th century, Avicennian logic had replaced Aristotelian logic as the dominant system of logic in the Islamic world.

The first criticisms of Aristotelian logic were written by Avicenna, who produced independent treatises on logic rather than commentaries. He criticized the logical school of Baghdad for their devotion to Aristotle at the time. He investigated the theory of definition and classification and the quantification of the predicates of categorical propositions, and developed an original theory on "temporal modal" syllogism. Its premises included modifiers such as "at all times", "at most times", and "at some time".

While Avicenna often relied on deductive reasoning in philosophy, he used a different approach in medicine. Avicenna contributed inventively to the development of inductive logic, which he used to pioneer the idea of a syndrome. In his medical writings, Avicenna was the first to describe the methods of agreement, difference and concomitant variation which are critical to inductive logic and the scientific method.

Ibn Hazm (994–1064) wrote the Scope of Logic, in which he stressed on the importance of sense perception as a source of knowledge. Al-Ghazali (Algazel) (1058–1111) had an important influence on the use of logic in theology, making use of Avicennian logic in Kalam.

Fakhr al-Din al-Razi (b. 1149) criticised Aristotle's "first figure" and developed a form of inductive logic, foreshadowing the system of inductive logic developed by John Stuart Mill (1806–1873). Systematic refutations of Greek logic were written by the Illuminationist school, founded by Shahab al-Din Suhrawardi (1155–1191), who developed the idea of "decisive necessity", an important innovation in the history of logical philosophical speculation. Another systematic refutation of Greek logic was written by Ibn Taymiyyah (1263–1328), the Ar-Radd 'ala al-Mantiqiyyin (Refutation of Greek Logicians), where he argued against the usefulness, though not the validity, of the syllogism and in favour of inductive reasoning.

== See also ==
- Early Islamic philosophy
- History of logic
- Qiyas
- Ijtihad

== Bibliography ==
- Rescher, Nicholas 1964. Studies in the History of Arabic Logic, Pittsburgh: University of Pittsburgh Press.
- Rescher, Nicholas (1966). Temporal Modalities in Arabic Logic. Dordrecht: Reidel.
