= Bishriyya =

Sub-sect of the Mu'tazilite school of Islamic theology

The Bishriyya was a sub-sect of the Mu'tazilite school of Islamic theology.

While the Mu'tazilite school generally was founded in Basra by Wasil ibn Ata, the Bishriyya follow the teachings of the Mu'tazili theologian and poet Bishr ibn al-Mu'tamir (d. 210 H / 825 CE).

== Commonly held beliefs ==
While each sect has their own view on certain issues which differentiate them from the Mu'tazila. The following beliefs are some in which generally all Mu'tazila sects agreed:

1. "God is an eternal being and being such, eternity is his special characteristic." Believing in the eternal attributes of God, they still follow the notion that what he says is preceded by his own being and is found in a time and place. They strongly believe in the denial of ascribing God with anthropomorphic characteristics.
2. "Man has power over his good and bad deeds and is also their creator." The general consensus among adherents to both classical Mu'tazila ideology and the adherents of its subsets have the belief that due to the fact that man has control over his own body and actions that he is the one that deserves either the rewards or punishments for his time on Earth.
3. They believe that through repentance and a good lifestyle, upon entering the next life, one will be rewarded for their obedience. However, if one passes on unrepentant, then they will be eternally damned.
4. Finally, Mu'tazilites agree that humans should inherently know the difference between good and evil based on sense of reason. With that sense of reason, man is also expected to have a basic understanding of God.

== Distinction from Mu'tazila ==
Specifically focusing on the Bishriyya school following the thoughts of Bishr ibn al-Mu'tamir, there were six distinctions between them and the general Mu'tazila doctrine.

1. They believed that senses like color, taste, and smell may stem from the secondary effects of man's actions. They've taken this from the naturalists at this time yet they differentiate themselves from these other thinkers by identifying a primary effect as opposed to a secondary effect.
2. "I do not maintain that man acts with this capacity in the first moment nor in the second moment; but I say that man acts, and the act does not take place except in the second moment." This is saying that he believes in order to be judged according to your actions that you must be competent and within your true capacity. He defines capacity in such a way that you must be within full health- physically, mentally, and internally.
3. Bishr believes that although God's abilities to punish a child are well within His rights to use that he will not because in doing so he would be committing an act of injustice which God cannot do. He explains how a child, not being within his or her capacity, is incapable of deserving punishment due to the nature of not being able to make their own valid decisions. Were God to punish a child, He would be therefore punishing a child on the merits of an adult in a way that would be contradictory to the nature of God and the nature of punishment.
4. God's will is a will of His acts. Due to the nature of the Mu'tazili thought of a created Quran and a rationalistic approach to God, the Bishriyya follow a doctrine that God's will is therefore succeeding him in being. In the classic take on God's presence in the Islamic sense, God's word is co-eternal but as a subset of the Mu'tazila school, they believe in God preceding his creations and actions.
5. God's grace is something that would cause everyone to believe in God and therefore act in a way of deserving reward the same as which those who currently believe deserve reward, except even more in this case because of God's grace. While God has grace, God is not required to bestow his grace upon anyone ever. A very interesting aspect to this belief also is that God's goodness is never ending and the bestowment of his grace and goodness is without limit and God must choose. Seeing as there is no limit to how much good God can do, God can always do better and therefore he is not required to do the best because there is no such thing. However, God must provide man with the capacity to believe without inhibitors of belief.
6. The final major distinction of the Bishriyya is that they believed that if you commit a grave sin, repent, and then commit the same grave sin again, that you deserve not only punishment for the grave sin you just committed but also punishment for the first time you committed said sin because when you repented, you were forgiven of that sin on the basis that you would not commit the sin again.

== See also ==
- Islamic schools and branches
