= Schools of Islamic theology =

Set of theological beliefs in the Islamic faith

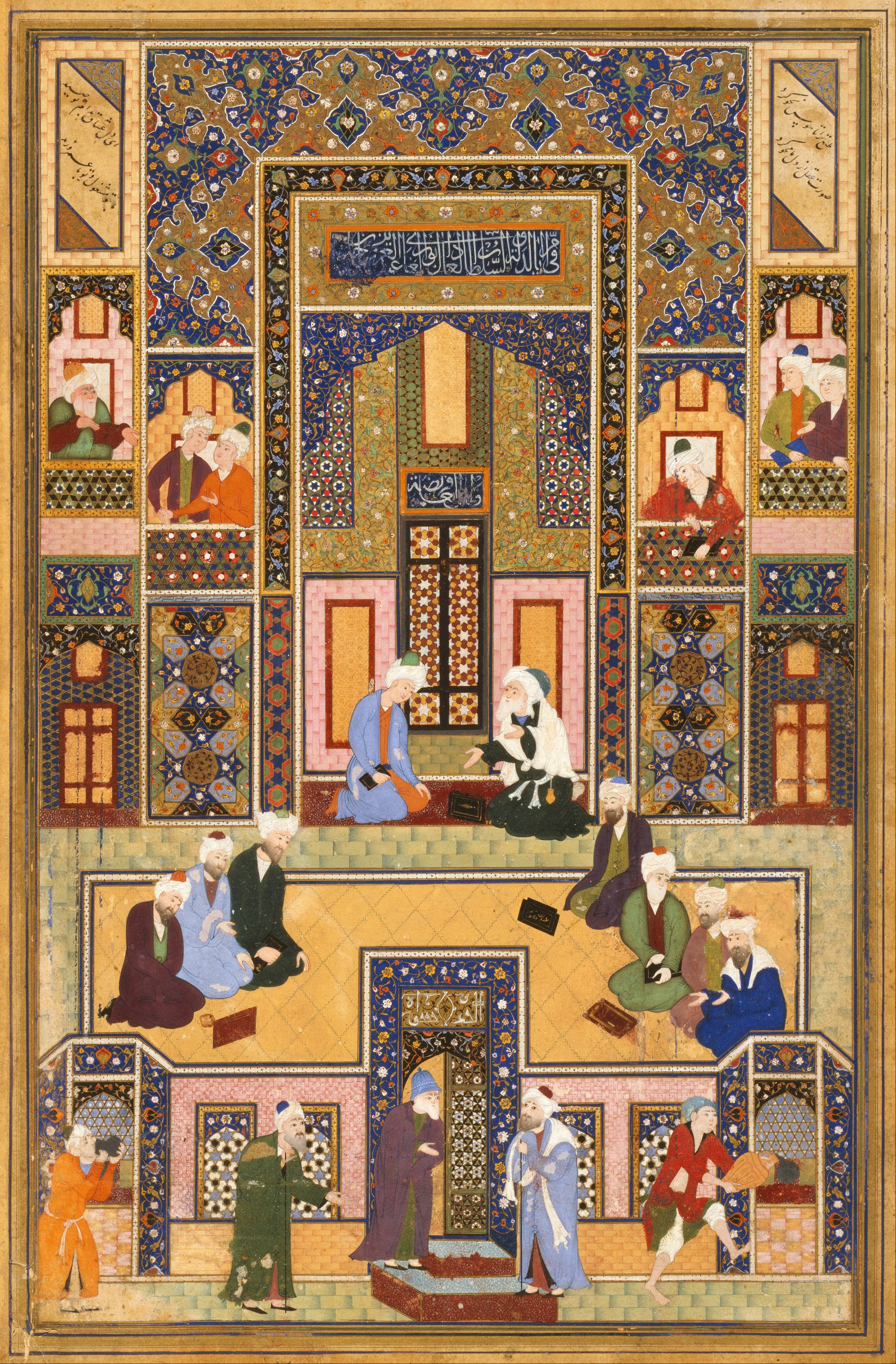
The Meeting of the Theologians, Persian painting by Abd Allah Musawwir (mid-16th century), Nelson-Atkins Museum of Art.

Schools of Islamic theology are various Islamic schools and branches in different schools of thought regarding creed. The main schools of Islamic theology include the extant Mu'tazili, Ash'ari, Maturidi, and Athari schools; the extinct ones include the Qadari, Jahmi, Murji', and Batini schools.

The main schism between Sunni, Shia, and Khariji branches of Islam was initially more political than theological, but theological differences have developed over time throughout the history of Islam.

== Divinity schools in Islamic theology ==
According to the Encyclopaedia of the Qurʾān (2006),

The Qurʾān displays a wide range of theological topics related to the religious thought of late antiquity and through its prophet Muhammad presents a coherent vision of the creator, the cosmos and man. The main issues of Muslim theological dispute prove to be hidden under the wording of the qurʾānic message, which is closely tied to Muḥammad's biography.

Modern scholars of the history of Islam and Islamic studies say that some instances of theological thought were already developed among polytheists in pre-Islamic Arabia, such as the belief in fatalism (ḳadar), which reoccurs in Islamic theology regarding the metaphysical debates on the attributes of God in Islam, predestination, and human free-will. An overview about diverse denominations according to Abu al-Yusr al-Bazdawi:

	Sunnism	Mu'tazilism	Kharijites	Philosophers	Jahmites	Murjites
Nature of God	God is a thing and a self, but not a body. God is in no place.	God is a thing, but not a body. God is in every place by knowledge only.	God is a thing and body	God is not a thing and not a body.	God is not a thing and not a body.	God is a thing and a body.
Attributes of God	God's attributes are eternal. They consist of Knowledge, Life, Power, and Strengh.	God's attributes are not eternal. They consist of Knowledge, Life, and Power.				
God's will of good and evil	All incidents, entities, and actions are by God's will. God can command obedience but will disobedience for his subject, as demonstrated in the case of Satan (Iblis).	Only good actions are by God's desire. God can only command obedience if God wills obedience or else God would be unjust.				
Eternity of the Quran	God's speech (i.e. the Qur'an) is eternal.	God's speech is created.	God's speech is created.		God's speech is created.	God's speech is eternal, but the words are created.
Origin of actions	Good and Evil actions are created by God and acquired by the servant.	Actions are created by the sevants, not by God.	Actions are created by the servant, not by God.		Actions are created by God and also performed by God.	
Faith and afterlife	Disobedient Muslims remain believers and only loss of faith makes an unbeliever as demonstrated in the case of Satan (Iblis). Sinful Muslims will attain paradise after purgatory.	Disobedient Muslims remain Muslims but will join the unbelievers in hell.	Disobedient Muslims become apostates and will join the unbelievers in hell.		God is not obligated to reward or punish: Both believers and unbelievers may go to paradise and both may go to hell.	Disobedient Muslims will join paradise and remain believers.
Resurrection	Bodily resurrection is true, but individually. Questioning of the grave by the angels Munkar and Nakir is affirmed. Paradise and Hell co-exist with the world, are created, but exist eternally henceforth.	Bodily resurrection is true. The questioning of the grave by the angels Munkar and Nakir is denied. Paradise and hell are yet to be created but exist eternally after judgement day.		Denial of bodily resurrection. The good souls ascend to the spiritual world, but evil souls remain in the bodily world and suffer therein.	Paradise and hell are created. Paradise and hell will eventually perish.	
Infallibility of the Prophets	The prophets and messengers are protected from intentional major and minor sins, but not from slips committed through forgetfulness or mistakes.	The prophets and messengers are protected from both major and minor sins.	Prophets and messengers are protected from both major and minor sins.			Prophets and messengers are protected from both major and minor sins.
Angels and Muslims	Muslims are superior to the angels.	Angels are superior to Muslims.				

The original schism between Kharijites, Sunnīs, and Shīʿas among Muslims was a dispute over the political and religious succession to the leadership of the Ummah (Muslim community) after the death of prophet Muhammad. From their essentially political position, the Kharijites developed extreme doctrines that set them apart from both mainstream Sunnī and Shīʿa Muslims. Shīʿas believe ʿAlī ibn Abī Ṭālib is the true successor to Muhammad, while Sunnīs consider Abu Bakr to hold that position. The Kharijites broke away from both the Shīʿas and the Sunnīs during the First Fitna (the first Islamic Civil War); they were particularly noted for adopting a radical approach to takfīr (excommunication), whereby they declared both Sunnī and Shīʿa Muslims to be either infidels (kuffār) or false Muslims (munāfiḳūn), and therefore deemed them worthy of death for their perceived apostasy (ridda).

ʿAqīdah is an Islamic term meaning "creed" or "belief". Any religious belief system, or creed, can be considered an example of ʿaqīdah. This term has taken a significant technical usage in Muslim history and theology, denoting those matters over which Muslims hold conviction. The term is usually translated as "theology". Such traditions are divisions orthogonal to sectarian divisions within Islam, and a Muʿtazilite may, for example, belong to the Jaʿfari, Zaydī, or even Ḥanafī schools of Islamic jurisprudence.

In the history of Islam, one of the earliest systematic schools of Islamic theology to develop were the Muʿtazila in the mid-8th century CE. Muʿtazilite theologians emphasized the use of reason and rational thought, positing that the injunctions of God are accessible through rational thought and inquiry, and affirmed that the Quran was created (makhlūq) rather than co-eternal with God, which would develop into one of the most contentious questions in the history of Islamic theology.

In the 9th–10th century CE, the Ashʿarī school developed as a response to the Muʿtazila, founded by the 10th-century Muslim scholar and theologian Abū al-Ḥasan al-Ashʿarī. Ashʿarītes still taught the use of reason in understanding the Quran, but denied the possibility of deducing moral truths by reasoning. This position was opposed by the Māturīdī school; according to its founder, the 10th-century Muslim scholar and theologian Abū Manṣūr al-Māturīdī, human reason is supposed to acknowledge the existence of a creator deity (bāriʾ) solely based on rational thought and independently from divine revelation. He shared this conviction with his teacher and predecessor Abū Ḥanīfa al-Nuʿmān (8th century CE), whereas al-Ashʿarī never held such a view.

According to the Afghan-American philosopher Sayed Hassan Hussaini, the early schools of Islamic theology and theological beliefs among classical Muslim philosophers are characterized by "a rich color of Deism with a slight disposition toward theism".

Another point of contention was the relative position of imān ("faith") contrasted with taqwā ("piety"). Such schools of Islamic theology are summarized under ʿIlm al-Kalām, or "science of discourse", as opposed to mystical schools who deny that any theological truth may be discovered by means of discourse or reason.

== Sunnī schools of theology ==
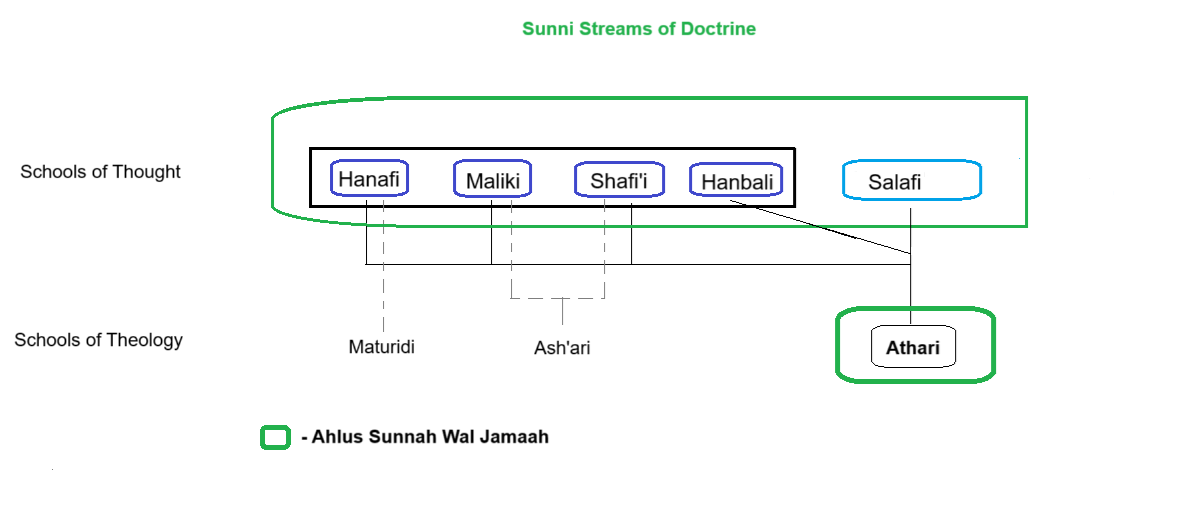
Main schools of thought within Sunni Islam, and other prominent streams.

Most Sunni scholars have adopted the Ash‘ariyya school of theology, but the similar Mātūrīd’iyyah school also has Sunni scholarly adherents. Sunni Muslims are the largest denomination of Islam and are known as 'Ahl as-Sunnah wa’l-Jamā‘h' or simply as 'Ahl as-Sunnah'. The word Sunni comes from the word Sunnah, which means the teachings and actions or examples of the Islamic prophet Muhammad. Therefore, the term "Sunni" refers to those who follow or maintain the Sunnah of Muhammad.

The Sunnis believe that Muhammad did not appoint a successor to lead the Muslim ummah (community) before his death, and after an initial period of confusion, a group of his most prominent companions gathered and elected Abu Bakr, Muhammad's close friend and a father-in-law, as the first 'Caliph 'of Islam. Sunni Muslims regard the first four caliphs (Abu Bakr, `Umar ibn al-Khattāb, Uthman Ibn Affan and Ali ibn Abu Talib) as "al-Khulafā’ur-Rāshidūn" or "The Rightly Guided Caliphs". After the Rashidun, the position turned into a hereditary right and the caliph's role was limited to being a political symbol of Muslim strength and unity.

=== Athari ===
Atharism (Arabic: أثري; textualism) is a movement of Islamic scholars who reject rationalistic Islamic theology (kalam) in favor of strict textualism in interpreting the Quran. The name is derived from the Arabic word athar, literally meaning "remnant" and also referring to a "narrative". It has a minority position amongst the scholars and their disciples are called the Athariyya, or Atharis.

Earliest atharist such as Amir al-Sha'bi denounced the use of Qiyas (analogic deduction), as he strongly relied primarily on scriptural traditions. He also tried to convince other scholars that Qiyās was not a valid argument. Al-Sha'bi was recorded to have said: "Beware of Qiyās. For when you use it, you make what is halal to be haram and what is haram to be halal.".

For followers of the Athari movement, the "clear" meaning of the Qur'an, and especially the prophetic traditions, has sole authority in matters of belief, and to engage in rational disputation (kalam), even if one arrives at the truth, is absolutely forbidden. Atharis engage in an amodal reading of the Quran, as opposed to one engaged in ta'wil (metaphorical interpretation). They do not attempt to conceptualize the meanings of the Quran rationally, and believe that the "real" meaning should be consigned to God alone (tafwid). In essence, the meaning has been accepted without asking "how" or "Bi-la kaifa". In theory, Ahmad ibn Hanbal has stated this means rejecting any attribution of God with creatures; such as the doctrine of the rationalists (Mu'tazilah). thus, Ahmad rejecting the notion of Mu'tazilah that Qur'an was a creation, and instead stated Qur'an is a shifat (attribute) of God.

On the other hand, the famous Hanbali scholar Ibn al-Jawzi states, in Kitab Akhbar as-Sifat, that Ahmad ibn Hanbal would have been opposed to anthropomorphic interpretations of Quranic texts such as those of al-Qadi Abu Ya'la, Ibn Hamid, and Ibn az-Zaghuni. Based on Abu'l-Faraj ibn al-Jawzi's criticism of Athari-Hanbalis, Muhammad Abu Zahra, a professor of Islamic law at Cairo University deduced that the Salafi aqidah is located somewhere between ta'til and anthropopathy (Absolute Ẓāhirīsm in understanding the tashbih in Qur'an) in Islam. Absolute Ẓāhirīsm and total rejection of ta'wil are amongst the fundamental characteristics of this "new" Islamic school of theology.

=== Ilm al-Kalam ===
ʿIlm al-Kalām (Arabic: علم الكلام, literally "science of discourse"), usually foreshortened to kalām and sometimes called "Islamic scholastic theology" or "speculative theology", is a rational undertaking born out of the need to establish and defend the tenets of Islamic faith against doubters and detractors. ʿIlm al-Kalām incorporates Aristotelian reasoning and logic into Islamic theology. A Muslim scholar of kalām is referred to as a mutakallim (plural: mutakallimūn) as distinguished from philosophers, jurists, and scientists. There are many possible interpretations as to why this discipline was originally called kalām; one is that the widest controversy in this discipline has been about whether the Word of God, as revealed in the Quran, can be considered part of God's essence and therefore not created, or whether it was made into words in the normal sense of speech, and is therefore created. There are many schools of Kalam, the main ones being the Mutazila, the Ash'ari and Maturidi schools in Sunni Islam. Traditionalist theology rejects the use of kalam, regarding humans reason as sinful in unseen matters.

==== Ash'ari ====
Ashʿarīyyah is a school of theology that was founded by the Arab Muslim scholar, reformer, and scholastic theologian Abū al-Ḥasan al-Ashʿarī (874–936), who developed the school of thought founded by Ibn Kullab a century earlier.

It established an orthodox guideline based on scriptural authority, rationality, and theological rationalism. As a young man, al-Ashʿarī studied under al-Jubba'i, a renowned teacher of Muʿtazilite theology and philosophy. He was noted for his teachings on atomism, among the earliest Islamic philosophies, and for al-Ashʿarī this was the basis for propagating the view that God created every moment in time and every particle of matter. He nonetheless believed in free will, elaborating the thoughts of Dirar ibn 'Amr and Abu Hanifa into a "dual agent" or "acquisition" (iktisab) account of free will.

Al-Ashʿarī established a middle way between the doctrines of the Aṯharī and Muʿtazila schools of Islamic theology, based both on reliance on the sacred scriptures of Islam and theological rationalism concerning the agency and attributes of God. The Ashʿarī school reasoned that truth can only be known through revelation, and that without revelation the unaided human mind would not be able to know if something is good or evil. It has been called "an attempt to create a middle position" between the rationalism of the Muʿtazilites and scripturalism of the traditionalists. For the Ashʿarīyyah God is uncreated, eternal, and unique, simple, and one. God's attributes are also eternal and uncreated. Differing from the Muʿtazila the Ashʿarīyyah posit God as the author of both good and evil actions.

In an attempt to explain how God is the author of every action, yet humans bear responsibility for their sins, al-Ashʿarī developed the doctrine of kasb (acquisition), whereby any and all human acts, even the raising of a finger, are created by God, but the human being who performs the act is responsible for it, because they have "acquired" the act. For the Ashʿarīyyah, belief and sin do are no contradictions. Even if a believer commits a major sin, they remain a believer.

While al-Ashʿarī opposed the views of the rival Muʿtazilite school, he was also opposed to the view which rejected all debate, held by certain schools such as the Zahiri ("literalist"), Mujassimite ("anthropotheist"), and Muhaddithin ("traditionalist") schools for their over-emphasis on taqlid (imitation) in his Istihsan al‑Khaud. Ashʿarism eventually became the predominant school of theological thought within Sunnī Islam, and is regarded by some as the single most important school of Islamic theology in the history of Islam. Amongst the most famous Ashʿarite theologians are Imam Nawawi, Ibn Hajar al-Asqalani, Ibn al-Jawzi, al-Ghazali, al-Suyuti, Izz al-Din ibn 'Abd al-Salam, Fakhr al-Din al-Razi, Ibn 'Asakir, al-Subki, al-Taftazani, al-Baqillani and al-Bayhaqi.

==== Maturidi ====
The Maturidi school was founded by Abu Mansur al-Maturidi (853–944), and is the most popular theological school amongst Muslims, especially in the areas formerly controlled by the Ottomans and the Mughals. Today, the Maturidi school is the position favored by the Ahl ar-Ra'y ("people of reason"), which includes only the Hanafi school of fiqh who make up the majority of Sunni Muslims.

The Maturidi school takes the middle position between the Ash'ari and Mu'tazili schools on the questions of knowing truth and free will. The Maturidis say that the unaided human mind is able to find out that some of the more major sins such as alcohol or murder are evil without the help of revelation, but still maintain that revelation is the ultimate source of knowledge. Additionally, the Maturidi believe that God created and can control all of His creation, but that He allows humans to make individual decisions and choices for themselves.

Ethics are considered to have objective existence. Humans are thus capable of recognizing good and bad without revelation, but reason alone. However, prophets and revelation are necessary to explain matters beyond human reason. In matters of the six articles of faith, Māturīdism notably holds the idea that paradise and hell coexist with the current world, and does not adhere to the doctrine of impeccability of angels.

== Muʿtazila ==
Muʿtazila is a school of theology that appeared in early Islāmic history and were known for their neutrality in the dispute between Alī and his opponents after the death of the third caliph, Uthman. By the 10th century CE the term had also come to refer to an Islamic school of speculative theology (kalām) that flourished in Basra and Baghdad (8th–10th century). According to Sunni sources, Muʿtazili theology originated in the eighth century in Basra (now in Iraq) when Wāṣil ibn ʿAṭā' (died 131 AH/748 AD) withdrew (iʿtazala, hence the name Mu'tazila) from the teaching lessons of Hasan al-Basri after a theological dispute regarding the issue of al-Manzilah bayna al-Manzilatayn (a position between two positions), where Wasil ibn Ata reasoned that a grave sinner (fāsiq) could be classed neither as believer nor unbeliever but was in an intermediate position (al-manzilah bayna manzilatayn).

The later Mu'tazila school developed an Islamic type of rationalism, partly influenced by Ancient Greek philosophy, based around three fundamental principles: the oneness (Tawhid) and justice (Al-'adl) of God, human freedom of action, and the creation of the Quran. The Muʿtazilites are best known for rejecting the doctrine of the Quran as uncreated and co-eternal with God, asserting that if the Quran is the word of God, he logically "must have preceded his own speech". This went against the orthodox Sunni position which argued that with God being all knowing, his knowledge of the Quran must have been eternal, hence uncreated just like him. One of the most notable episode of Mu'tazila conflict with the Atharist orthodoxy was during the reign of Abbasid caliph Al-Ma'mun, where the long feud of Mu'tazila Quran creationism doctrine opposed by the atharist doctrine that Quran as shifat (attribution) of God which championed by Ahmad ibn Hanbal, the founder of Hanbali school. Ahmad was recorded engaged in long debates against the leading Mu'tazilite and qadi of caliphate, Ahmad ibn Abi Du'ad regarding the said matter about the nature of Quran.

Though Muʿtazilis later relied on logic and different aspects of early Islamic philosophy and ancient Greek philosophy, the basics of Islam is their starting point and ultimate reference. Several groups were later influenced by Muʿtazilite theology, such as the Bishriyya, who followed the teachings of Bishr ibn al-Mu'tamir, and the Bahshamiyya, who followed the teachings of Abu Hashim al-Jubba'i.

The theology of the Muʿtazilis is characterized by "The Five Principles": They confess the unity of God, asserting God's justice and reject that God is the author of evil, affirm God's promise for reward and threat of punishment in the afterlife, considering an intermediary state for sinful Muslims between pious believers and unbelievers, and consider if a duty to demand goodness and deprecate the reprehensible, either with words, hands, or the sword.

== Jahmiyyah ==
Jahmis were the followers of the Islamic theologian Jahm bin Safwan who associate himself with Al-Harith ibn Surayj. He was an exponent of extreme determinism according to which a man acts only metaphorically in the same way in which the sun acts or does something when it sets.

== Qadariyyah ==
Qadariyyah is an originally derogatory term designating early Islamic theologians who asserted human beings are ontologically free and have a perfect free will, whose exercise justifies divine punishment and absolving God of responsibility for evil in the world. Their doctrines were adopted by the Mu'tazilis and rejected by the Ash'aris. The tension between free will and God's omnipotence was later reconciled by the Maturidi school of theology, which asserted that God grants human beings their agency, but can remove or otherwise alter it at any time.

Hasan al Basri (642 - 728) was the first who defined Qadariyya doctrines in a systematic way: 1) God creates only good, evil stems from free will. 2) Humanity has free will to choose doing the will of God or not. 3) God only leads humans astray if they first have given him the occasion to do so by demonstrating the intention to sin. Related to the question of the origin of evil is the nature of the devil (Iblīs). By asserted the origin of the devil lies in his free will to sin, Qadariyya and later Mutazilites rejected the angelic origin of Iblīs. Amr ibn Ubayd (died 761), one of Hasan's later students, became a leading figure in the Mutazilite movement, still advocating the Qadariyya belief in free will independent of God.

== Muhakkima ==
The groups that were seceded from Ali's army in the end of the Arbitration Incident constituted the branch of Muhakkima (Arabic: محكمة). They are mainly divided into two major sects called as Kharijites and Ibadis.

=== Khawarij ===
The Kharijites considered the caliphate of Abu Bakr and Umar to be rightly guided but believed that Uthman ibn Affan had deviated from the path of justice and truth in the last days of his caliphate, and hence was liable to be killed or displaced. They also believed that Ali ibn Abi Talib committed a grave sin when he agreed on the arbitration with Muʿāwiyah. In the Battle of Siffin, Ali acceded to Muawiyah's suggestion to stop the fighting and resort to negotiation. A large portion of Ali's troops (who later became the first Kharijites) refused to concede to that agreement, and they considered that Ali had breached a Qur'anic verse which states that The decision is only for Allah (Qur'an 6:57), which the Kharijites interpreted to mean that the outcome of a conflict can only be decided in battle (by God) and not in negotiations (by human beings).

The Kharijites thus deemed the arbitrators (Abu Musa al-Ashʿari and Amr Ibn Al-As), the leaders who appointed these arbitrators (Ali and Muʿāwiyah) and all those who agreed on the arbitration (all companions of Ali and Muʿāwiyah) as Kuffār (disbelievers), having breached the rules of the Qur'an. They believed that all participants in the Battle of Jamal, including Talha, Zubayr (both being companions of Muhammad) and Aisha had committed a Kabira (major sin in Islam).

Kharijites reject the doctrine of infallibility for the leader of the Muslim community, in contrast to Shi'a but in agreement with Sunnis. Modern-day Islamic scholar Abul Ala Maududi wrote an analysis of Kharijite beliefs, marking a number of differences between Kharijism and Sunni Islam. The Kharijites believed that the act of sinning is analogous to Kufr (disbelief) and that every grave sinner was regarded as a Kāfir (disbeliever) unless he repents. With this argument, they denounced all the above-mentioned Ṣaḥābah and even cursed and used abusive language against them. Ordinary Muslims were also declared disbelievers because first, they were not free of sin; secondly they regarded the above-mentioned Ṣaḥābah as believers and considered them as religious leaders, even inferring Islamic jurisprudence from the Hadeeth narrated by them. They also believed that it is not a must for the caliph to be from the Quraysh. Any pious Muslim nominated by other Muslims could be an eligible caliph. Additionally, Kharijites believed that obedience to the caliph is binding as long as he is managing the affairs with justice and consultation, but if he deviates, then it becomes obligatory to confront him, demote him and even kill him.

=== Ibadiyya ===
Ibadiyya has some common beliefs overlapping with the Ashʿarī and Mu'tazila schools, mainstream Sunni Islam, and some Shīʿīte sects.

== Murji'ah ==
Murji'ah (Arabic: المرجئة) was an early Islamic school whose followers are known in English as "Murjites" or "Murji'ites" (المرجئون). The Murji'ah emerged as a theological school in response to the Kharijites on the early question about the relationship between sin and apostasy (rida). The Murji'ah believed that sin did not affect a person's beliefs (iman) but rather their piety (taqwa). Therefore, they advocated the idea of "delayed judgement", (irjaa). The Murji'ah maintain that anyone who proclaims the bare minimum of faith must be considered a Muslim, and sin alone cannot cause someone to become a disbeliever (kafir). The Murjite opinion would eventually dominate that of the Kharijites and become the mainstream opinion in Sunni Islam. The later schools of Sunni theology adopted their stance while form more developed theological schools and concepts.

== Shīʿa schools of theology ==
=== Zaydi-Fivers ===
The Zaydi denomination of Shīʿa Islam is close to the Muʿtazila school in matters of theological doctrine. There are a few issues between both schools, most notably the Zaydi doctrine of the Imamate, which is rejected by the Muʿtazilites. Amongst the Shīʿa, Zaydis are most similar to Sunnīs, since Zaydism shares similar doctrines and jurisprudential opinions with Sunnī scholars.

=== Bāṭin’iyyah ===
The Bāṭen’iyyah was originally introduced by Abu’l-Khāttāb Muhammad ibn Abu Zaynab al-Asadī, and later developed by Maymūn al-Qaddāh and his son ʿAbd Allāh ibn Maymūn for the esoteric interpretation of the Quran. The members of Bāṭen’iyyah may belong to either the Ismāʿīlī or Twelver denominations of Shīʿa Islam.

==== Imami-Ismā'īlīs ====
The Ismāʿīlīs differ from Twelvers because they had living imams or da'is for centuries. They followed Isma'il ibn Jafar, elder brother of Musa al-Kadhim, as the rightful Imam after his father Ja'far al-Sadiq. The Ismailis believe that whether Imam Ismail did or did not die before Imam Ja'far, he had passed on the mantle of the imāmate to his son Muḥammad ibn Ismā'īl al-Maktum as the next imam.

==== Batini-Twelver ʿAqīdah schools ====
The followers of Bāṭen’iyyah-Twelver school consist of Alevis and Nusayris, who developed their own system of Islamic jurisprudence and do not pursue the Ja'fari jurisprudence. Their combined population is nearly around 1% of the global Muslim population.

===== Alevism =====
Alevis are sometimes categorized as part of Twelver Shīʿīsm, and sometimes as its own religious tradition, as it has markedly different philosophy, customs, and rituals. They have many Tasawwufī characteristics and express belief in the Qur'an and The Twelve Imams, but reject polygamy and accept religious traditions predating Islam, like Turkic shamanism. They are significant in East-Central Turkey. They are sometimes considered a Sufi brotherhood, and have an untraditional form of religious leadership that is not scholarship-oriented like other Sunnī and Shīʿa groups. 7 to 11 million Alevis, including the other denominations of Twelver Shīʿītes, live in Anatolia.

====== Alevi Islamic school of divinity ======
In Turkey, Shīʿa Muslims follow the Ja'fari jurisprudence, which tracks back to the sixth Shia Imam Ja'far al-Sadiq, and are called "Ja'faris".

- The Alevi-Turks have a unique and perplex conviction tracing back to the Kaysanites and Khurramites which are considered as Ghulat Shīʿītes. According to Turkish scholar Abdülbaki Gölpınarlı, the Qizilbash ("Red-Heads") of the 16th century – a religious and political movement in Azerbaijan that helped to establish the Safavid dynasty – were "spiritual descendants of the Khurramites".
- Their aqidah (theological conviction) is based upon a syncretic fiqh system called as "Batiniyya-Sufism" which incorporates some Qarmatian sentiments, originally introduced by "Abu’l-Khāttāb Muhammad ibn Abu Zaynab al-Asadī", and later developed by Maymun al-Qāddāh and his son ʿAbd Allāh ibn Maymun.
- On the other hand, the members of Bektashi Order have a conviction of "Batiniyya Isma'ilism" and "Hurufism" with a strong belief in The Twelve Imams.
- In conclusion, Qizilbash-Alevis are not a part of Ja'fari jurisprudence fiqh, even though they can be considered as members of different Tariqa of Shia Islam all looks like sub-classes of Twelver. Their conviction includes "Batiniyya-Hurufism" and "Sevener-Qarmatians-Ismailism" sentiments.
- The Twelver branch of Shia Islam Muslim population of Turkey is composed of Mu'tazila aqidah of Ja'fari jurisprudence madhhab, Batiniyya-Sufism aqidah of Maymūn’al-Qāddāhī fiqh of the Alevīs, and Cillī aqidah of Maymūn ibn Abu’l-Qāsim Sulaiman ibn Ahmad ibn at-Tabarānī fiqh of the Alawites.

===== Baktāshism (Bektaşilik) =====
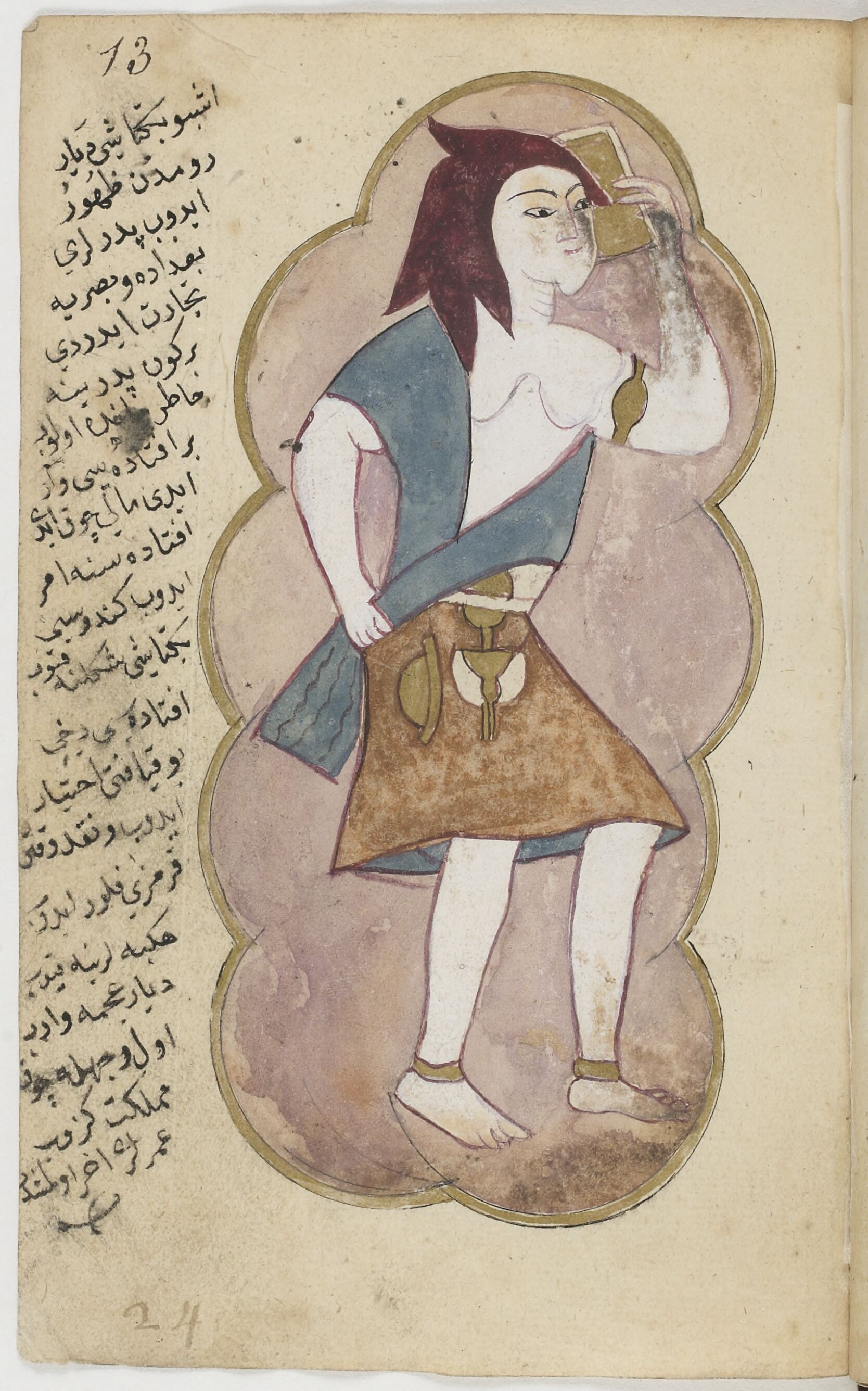
The founder of the Bektashiyyah sufi order, Hacı Bektaş-ı Veli (Ḥājjī Baktāsh Walī)

====== Baktāshi Islamic School of Divinity ======
The Bektashiyyah is a Shia Sufi order founded in the 13th century by Haji Bektash Veli, a dervish who escaped Central Asia and found refuge with the Seljuks in Anatolia at the time of the Mongol invasions (1219–23). This order gained a great following in rural areas and it later developed in two branches: the Çelebi clan, who claimed to be physical descendants of Haji Bektash Veli, were called "Bel evladları" (children of the loins), and became the hereditary spiritual leaders of the rural Alevis; and the Babağan, those faithful to the path "Yol evladları" (children of the way), who dominated the official Bektashi Sufi order with its elected leadership.

Bektashism places much emphasis on the concept of Wahdat-ul-Wujood وحدة الوجود, the "Unity of Being" that was formulated by Ibn Arabi. This has often been labeled as pantheism, although it is a concept closer to panentheism. Bektashism is also heavily permeated with Shiite concepts, such as the marked veneration of Ali, The Twelve Imams, and the ritual commemoration of Ashurah marking the Battle of Karbala. The old Persian holiday of Nowruz is celebrated by Bektashis as Imam Ali's birthday.

In keeping with the central belief of Wahdat-ul-Wujood the Bektashi see reality contained in Haqq-Muhammad-Ali, a single unified entity. Bektashi do not consider this a form of trinity. There are many other practices and ceremonies that share similarity with other faiths, such as a ritual meal (muhabbet) and yearly confession of sins to a baba (magfirat-i zunub مغفرة الذنوب). Bektashis base their practices and rituals on their non-orthodox and mystical interpretation and understanding of the Qur'an and the prophetic practice (Sunnah). They have no written doctrine specific to them, thus rules and rituals may differ depending on under whose influence one has been taught. Bektashis generally revere Sufi mystics outside of their own order, such as Ibn Arabi, Al-Ghazali and Jelalludin Rumi who are close in spirit to them.

====== The Baktāshi ʿaqīdah ======
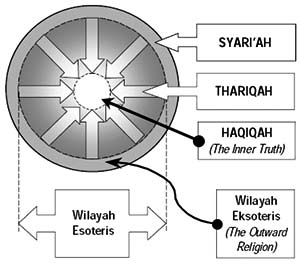
Four Spiritual Stations in Bektashiyyah: Sharia, tariqa, haqiqa, and the fourth station, marifa, which is considered "unseen", is actually the center of the haqiqa region. Marifa is the essence of all four stations.

The Bektashi Order is a Sufi order and shares much in common with other Islamic mystical movements, such as the need for an experienced spiritual guide — called a baba in Bektashi parlance — as well as the doctrine of "the four gates that must be traversed": the "Sharia" (religious law), "Tariqah" (the spiritual path), "Haqiqah" (truth), and "Marifa" (true knowledge).

Bektashis hold that the Qur'an has two levels of meaning: an outer (Zāher ظاهر) and an inner (bāṭen باطن). They hold the latter to be superior and eternal and this is reflected in their understanding of both the universe and humanity, which is a view that can also be found in Ismailism and Batiniyya.

Bektashism is also initiatic and members must traverse various levels or ranks as they progress along the spiritual path to the Reality. First level members are called aşıks عاشق. They are those who, while not having taken initiation into the order, are nevertheless drawn to it. Following initiation (called nasip) one becomes a mühip محب. After some time as a mühip, one can take further vows and become a dervish. The next level above dervish is that of baba. The baba (lit. father) is considered to be the head of a tekke and qualified to give spiritual guidance (irshad إرشاد). Above the baba is the rank of halife-baba (or dede, grandfather). Traditionally there were twelve of these, the most senior being the dedebaba (great-grandfather). The dedebaba was considered to be the highest ranking authority in the Bektashi Order. Traditionally the residence of the dedebaba was the Pir Evi (The Saint's Home) which was located in the shrine of Hajji Bektash Wali in the central Anatolian town of Hacıbektaş (Solucakarahüyük).

=== Ithnā'ashariyyah ===
Twelvers believe in the twelve Shīʿa Imams. The twelfth Imam is believed to be in occultation, and will appear again just before the Qiyamah (Islamic view of the Last Judgment). The Shia hadiths include the sayings of the Imams. They are the largest Shia school of thought (93%), predominant in Azerbaijan, Iran, Iraq, Lebanon, and Bahrain and have a significant population in Pakistan, India, Afghanistan, Kuwait and the Eastern province of Saudi Arabia. The Twelver Shīʿas are followers of either the Jaf'ari or Batiniyyah madh'habs.

==== Imami-Ja'faris ====
Followers of the Ja'fari madh'hab are divided into several sub-groups, all of which adhere to the principles of the Theology of Twelvers.

===== Usulism =====
The Usuli constitute the overwhelming majority within the Twelver Shia community. They follow a Marjaʿ-i Taqlid in matters of taqlid and fiqh. Usulis are primarily found in Iran, Pakistan, Azerbaijan, India, Iraq, and Lebanon.

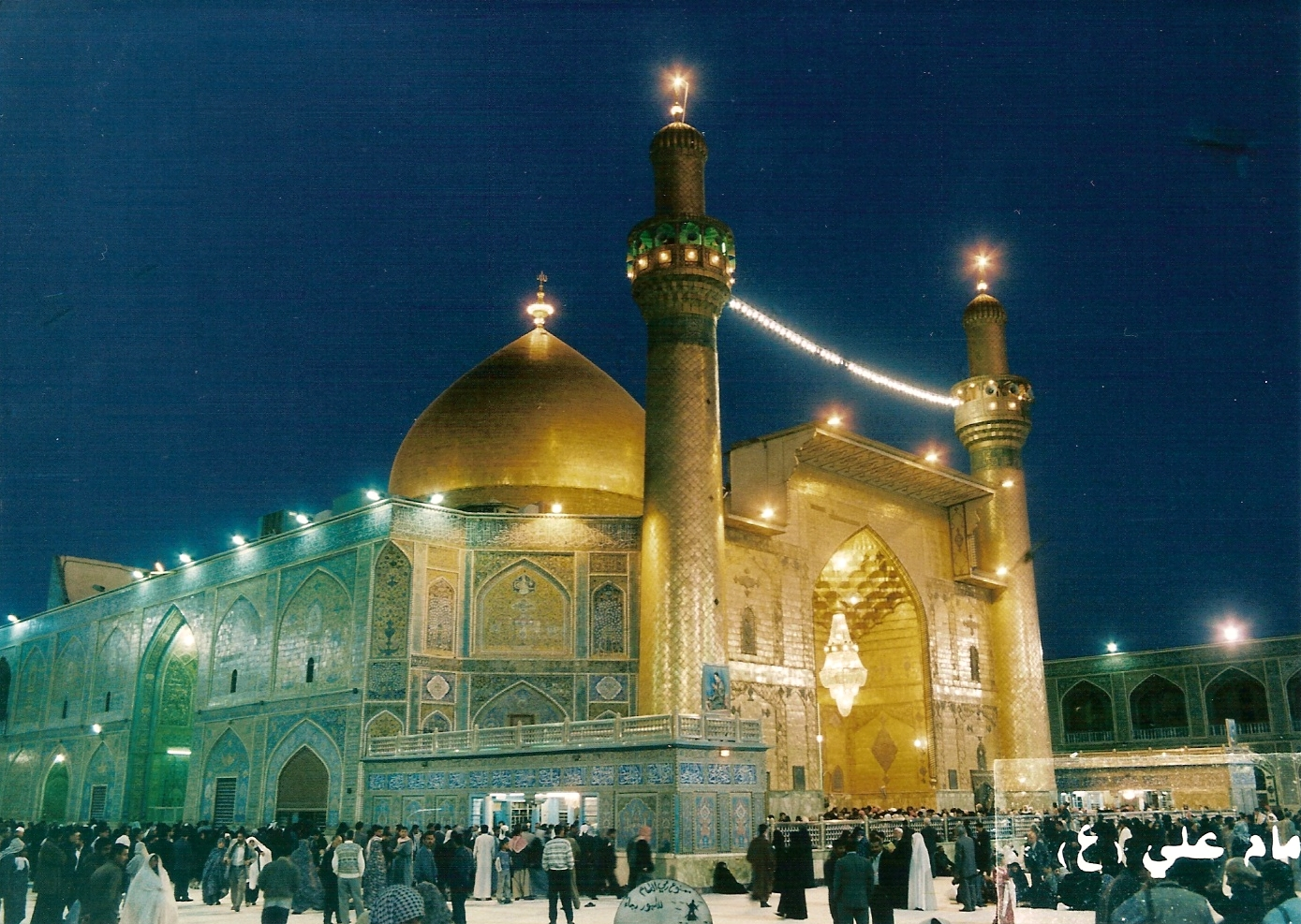
Imam Ali Shrine in Najaf, Iraq, where Shias believe Ali is buried.

===== Akhbarism =====
The Akhbari school, while sharing many foundations with the Usulis, rejects the use of ijtihad in favor of strict reliance on hadith. Akhbaris are mainly concentrated in Bahrain.

===== Shaykhism =====
Shaykhism is an Islamic religious movement founded by Shaykh Ahmad in early 19th-century Iran during the Qajar dynasty. It incorporates elements of Sufi, Shia, and Akhbari thought. In the mid-19th century, many Shaykhis converted to the Bábí and Baháʼí religions, both of which hold Shaykh Ahmad in high regard.

==== Ghulāt-Imamis ====
===== ‘Alawism =====
Alawites are also called Nusayris, Nusairis, Namiriya or Ansariyya. Their madhhab is established by Ibn Nusayr, and their aqidah is developed by Al-Khaṣībī. They follow Cillī aqidah of "Maymūn ibn Abu’l-Qāsim Sulaiman ibn Ahmad ibn at-Tabarānī fiqh" of the ‘Alawis. One million three hundred and fifty thousand of them lived in Syria and Lebanon in 1970. It is estimated they are 10–12% of the population of Syria of 23 million in 2013.

====== ‘Alawite Islamic School of Divinity ======
Alawites consider themselves to be Muslims, although some Sunnis dispute that they are. Alawite doctrine incorporates Gnostic, neo-Platonic, Islamic, Christian and other elements and has, therefore, been described as syncretistic. Their theology is based on a divine triad, or trinity, which is the core of Alawite belief. The triad comprises three emanations of the one God: the supreme aspect or entity called the "Essence" or the "Meaning" (both being translations of ma'na), together with two lesser emanations known as his "Name" (ism), or "Veil" (hijab), and his "Gate" (bab). These emanations have manifested themselves in different human forms over several cycles in history, the last cycle of which was as Ali (the Essence/Meaning), Muhammad (the Name) and Salman the Persian (the Gate). Alawite belief is summarised in the formula: "I turn to the Gate; I bow before the Name; I adore the Meaning". The claim that Alawites believe Ali is a deity has been contested by some scholars as a misrepresentation on the basis that Ali is, in fact, considered an "essence or form", not a human being, by which believers can "grasp God". Alawites also hold that they were originally stars or divine lights that were cast out of heaven through disobedience and must undergo repeated reincarnation (or metempsychosis) before returning to heaven. They can be reincarnated as Christians or others through sin and as animals if they become infidels.

Alawite beliefs have never been confirmed by their modern religious authorities. Alawites tend to conceal their beliefs (taqiyya) due to historical persecution. Some tenets of the faith are secret, known only to a select few; therefore, they have been described as a mystical sect. In addition to Islamic festivals, the Alawites have been reported to celebrate or honor certain Christian festivals such as the birth of Jesus and Palm Sunday. Their most-important feast is Eid al-Ghadeer.

====== The ‘Alawite ʿaqīdah ======
Alawites have always described themselves as being Twelver Shi'ite Muslims and have been recognized as such by the prominent Lebanese Shi'ite cleric Musa al-Sadr. The Sunni Grand Mufti of Jerusalem Haj Amin al-Husseini issued a fatwa recognising them as part of the Muslim community in the interest of Arab nationalism. However, Athari Sunni (modern day Salafis) scholars such as Ibn Kathir (a disciple of Ibn Taymiyya) have categorised Alawites as pagans in their writings.

Barry Rubin has suggested that Syrian leader Hafez al-Assad and his son and successor Bashar al-Assad pressed their fellow Alawites "to behave like regular Muslims, shedding (or at least concealing) their distinctive aspects". During the early 1970s a booklet, al-`Alawiyyun Shi'atu Ahl al-Bait ("The Alawites are Followers of the Household of the Prophet") was published, which was "signed by numerous 'Alawi' men of religion", described the doctrines of the Imami Shia as Alawite. Additionally, there has been a recent movement to unite Alawism and the other branches of Twelver Islam through educational exchange programs in Syria and Qom.

Some sources have discussed the "Sunnification" of Alawites under the al-Assad regime. Joshua Landis, director of the Center for Middle East Studies, writes that Hafez al-Assad "tried to turn Alawites into 'good' (read Sunnified) Muslims in exchange for preserving a modicum of secularism and tolerance in society". On the other hand, Al-Assad "declared the Alawites to be nothing but Twelver Shiites". In a paper, "Islamic Education in Syria", Landis wrote that "no mention" is made in Syrian textbooks (controlled by the Al-Assad regime) of Alawites, Druze, Ismailis or Shia Islam; Islam was presented as a monolithic religion. Ali Sulayman al-Ahmad, chief judge of the Baathist Syrian state, has said:

We are ‘Alawi Muslims. Our book is the Qur'an. Our prophet is Muhammad. The Ka`ba is our qibla, and our Dīn (religion) is Islam.

===== Kızılbaşlık =====
====== The Qizilbash ʿaqīdah ======
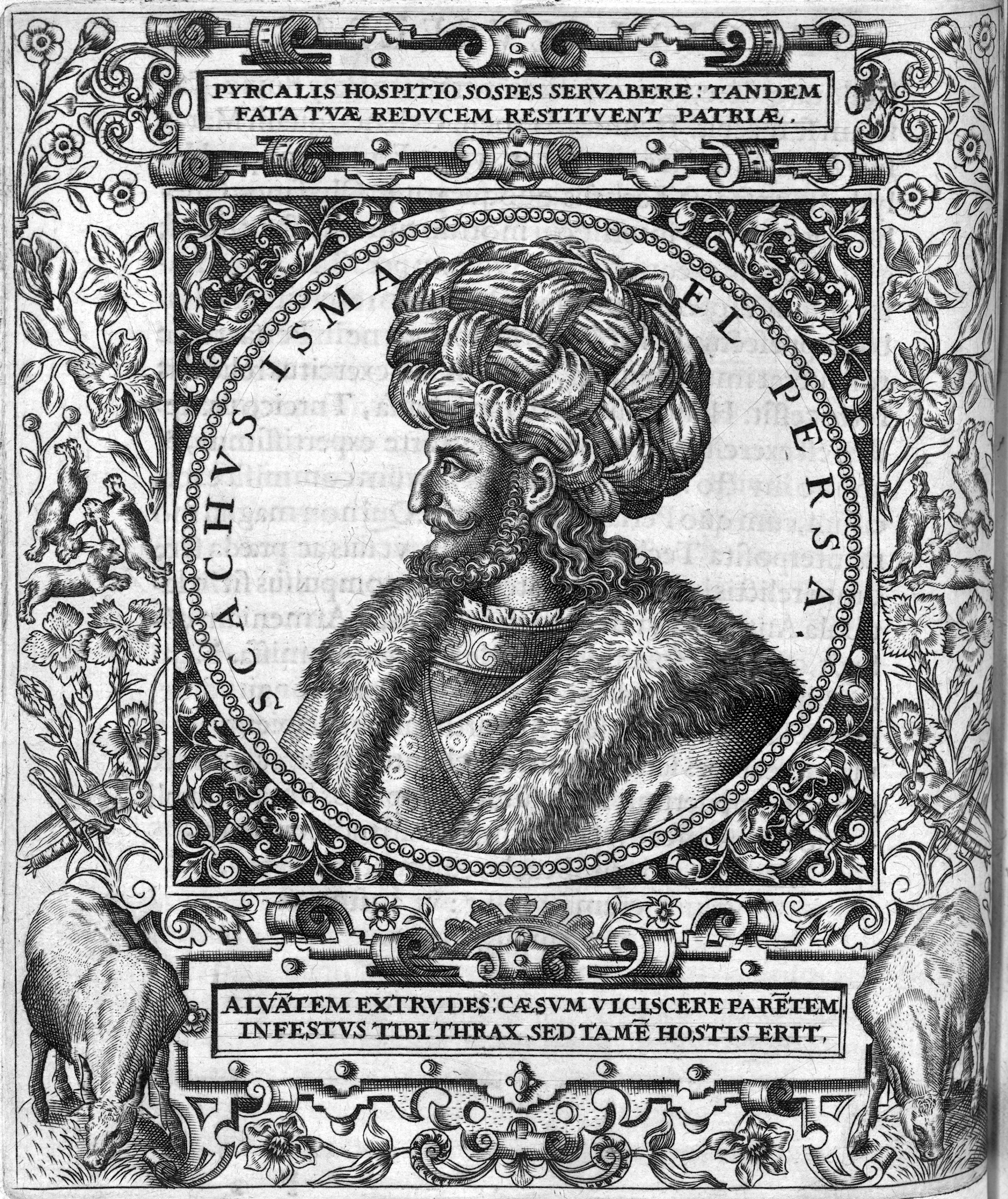
Shah Ismail I, the Sheikh of the Safavi tariqa, founder of the Safavid dynasty of Iran, and the Commander-in-chief of the Kızılbaş armies had contributed a lot for the development and implementation of The Qizilbash ʿAqīdah amongst the Turkmen people.

Qizilbash and Bektashi tariqah shared common religious beliefs and practices becoming intermingled as Alevis in spite of many local variations. Isolated from both the Sunni Ottomans and the Twelver Shi`a Safavids, Qizilbash and Bektashi developed traditions, practices, and doctrines by the early 17th century which marked them as a closed autonomous religious community. As a result of the immense pressures to conform to Sunni Islam, all members of Alevism developed a tradition of opposition (ibāḥa) to all forms of external religion.

The doctrine of Qizilbashism is well explained in the following poem written by the Shaykh of Safaviyya tariqah Shāh Ismāʿīl Khaṭāʾī:

من داها نسنه بيلمه زه م / Men daha nesne bilmezem, (I don't know any other object)

١ّللَه بير محممد على́دير / Allah bir Muhammad-Ali'dir. (Allah is unique Muhammad-Ali)

اؤزوم غوربتده سالمازام / Özüm gurbette salmazam, (I can't let out my own essence to places far from my homeland)

١ّللَه بير محممد على́دير / Allah bir Muhammad-Ali'dir. (Allah is unique Muhammad-Ali)

اونلار بيردير، بير اولوبدور / Onlar birdir, bir oluştur, (They are unique, a single one, i.e. Haqq-Muhammad-Ali)

يئردن گؤيه نور اولوبدور / Yerden göğe nûr oluştur, (It's a nūr from Earth to Sky)

دؤرد گوشه ده سيرر اولوبدور، / Dört guşede sır oluştur, (It's a mysterious occult secret in every corner of the square)

١ّللَه بير محممد على́دير / Allah bir Muhammad-Ali'dir. (Allah is unique Muhammad-Ali)

ختايى بو يولدا سردير / Khaṭāʾī bu yolda sırdır, (Khaṭāʾī in this tariqah is a mysterious occult secret)

سرين وئره نلر ده اردير / Sırın verenler de erdir, (Those reveal their own secret are private as well)

آيدا سيردير، گونده نوردور / Ayda sırdır, günde nûrdur, (Secret on Moon, nūr on day)

١ّللَه بير محممد على́دير / Allah bir Muhammad-Ali'dir. (Allah is unique Muhammad-Ali)

The lines of poetry above may easily be judged as an act of "Shirk" (polytheism) by the Sunni Ulama, but they have a bāṭenī taʾwīl (inner explanation) in Qizilbashism.

== Tashbih ==
=== Karram’iyyah ===
Anthropomorphic-Anthropopathic Karram’iyyah was founded by Abū ʿAbd Allāh Muḥammad b. Karrām. Ibn Karram considered that God was a substance and that He had a body (jism) finite in certain directions when He comes into contact with the Throne.

=== Anthropopathy in the history of Ghulāt Shīʿīsm ===
The belief of Incarnation was first emerged in Sabaʾiyya, and later some personages like Muhammad ibn al-Hanafiyyah, Abu Muslim, Sunpadh, Ishaq al-Turk, Al-Muqanna, Babak Khorramdin, Maziar and Ismail I had become the subject of God incarnates.

== Ahmadiyya ==
The Ahmadis' beliefs are more aligned with the Sunni tradition, such as The Five Pillars of Islam and The Six articles of Islamic Faith. Likewise, Ahmadis accept the Qur'an as their holy text, face the Kaaba during prayer, accept the authority of Hadiths (reported sayings of and stories about Muhammad) and practice the Sunnah (traditions) of Muhammad. However, Many Muslims consider Ahmadis as heretics.

Ahmadi teachings state that the founders of all the major world religions had divine origins. God was working towards the establishment of Islam as the final religion, because it was the most complete and included all the previous teachings of other religion (but they believe that all other religions have gone astray in their present form). The completion and consummation of the development of religion came about with the coming of Muhammad; and that the perfection of the ‘manifestation’ of Muhammad's prophethood and of the conveyance of his message was destined to occur with the coming of the Mahdi.

The Ahmadiyya Muslim Community regard Mirza Ghulam Ahmad, who claimed to be the promised Messiah ("Second Coming of Christ") the Mahdi awaited by the Muslims and a 'subordinate' prophet to Muhammad whose job was to restore the Sharia given to Muhammad by guiding or rallying disenchanted Ummah back to Islam and thwart attacks on Islam by its opponents, as the "Promised One" of all religions fulfilling eschatological prophecies found in the scriptures of the Abrahamic religions, as well as Zoroastrianism, the Indian religions, Native American traditions and others. Ahmadi Muslims believe that Ahmad was divinely commissioned as a true reflection of Muhammad's prophethood to establish the unity of God and to remind mankind of their duties towards God and God's creation.

== See also ==
- Outline of Islam
- Glossary of Islam
- Abdol Hamid Khosro Shahi
- Index of Islam-related articles
- Islamic eschatology
- Islamic schools and branches
- Islamic studies
- List of extinct Shia sects
- Shia–Sunni relations
- Shi'ite Crescent
- Succession to Muhammad
- Sunni Islam

== Sources ==
- Al-Dhahabi (1996). al-Arna'ut, Shu'ayb (ed.). Siyar aʿlām an-nubalāʾ (in Arabic). Beirut: Muʾassasat ar-Risāla.
