= Abu al-Husayn al-Basri =

Mu'tazilite jurist and theologian

Abu'l-Husayn al-Basri

Personal life
- Born: 370 H (980 CE)
- Died: 436 H (1044 CE)
- Era: Islamic golden age
- Main interest(s): Usul, Medicine
- Notable work: al-Mu'tamad fi Usul al-Fiqh
- Occupation: Scholar of Islam

Religious life
- Religion: Islam
- Denomination: Mu'tazila
- Jurisprudence: Hanafi

Muslim leader
- Influenced by: Wasil ibn Ata, Abu al-Hudhayl al-'Allaf
- Influenced: Ibn al-Malāḥimī

Abu'l-Husayn al-Basri (c. 980–1044 CE) was a Mu'tazilite jurist, physician and theologian. He wrote al-Mu'tamad fi Usul al-Fiqh (The Canon of the Foundations of Jurisprudence), a major source of influence in informing the foundations of Islamic jurisprudence until Fakhr al-Din al-Razi's al-Mahsul fi 'Ilm al-Usul (The Compilation of the Fundamentals of the Legal Sciences).

He was a physician as well as a disciple of the Mu'tazilite judge Abd al-Jabbar in Rey. He challenged some of his master's teachings and eventually compiled a huge (two volumes; 1500 pages) critical review of the arguments and proofs used in Islamic scholastic theology. This, he summarised in al-Mu'tamad and included a critique of the qualifications of a legist. His works were generally handed down among students of medicine, and it was a century before his teachings were revived and espoused by the Mu'tazili scholar Ibn al-Malahimi in Khorezm in Central Asia, where they gained recognition as a school of Mu'tazili theology.
