= Al-Qadi Abd al-Jabbar =

Muslim theologian (935–1025)

Personal life
- Born: Abu al-Hasan ʿAbd al-Jabbar ibn Ahmad ibn Khalil ibn ʿAbdallah al-Hamadani al-Asadabadi; 935 CE Asadabad, Iran
- Died: 1025 CE Ray, Iran
- Main interest(s): Islamic Jurisprudence, Hadith, Theology
- Notable work(s): Kitab al-Mughni fi Abwab al-Tawhid wa l-'Adl, Sharh al-Usul al-Khamsa, Tathbit Dala'il Nubuwwat Sayyidina Muhammad

Religious life
- Religion: Islam
- Denomination: Mu'tazilite
- Jurisprudence: Shafi'i

Muslim leader
- Influenced by: Wasil ibn Ata, Amr ibn Ubayd, Abu al-Hudhayl al-'Allaf, Abu Ishaq al-ʿAyyash, Abu ʿAbdullah al-Basri
- Influenced: Abu Rashid al-Nisaburi, Ibn Mattawayh, Abu al-Husayn al-Basri, Al-Zamakhshari

Abu al-Hasan ʿAbd al-Jabbar ibn Ahmad ibn Khalil ibn ʿAbdallah al-Hamadani al-Asadabadi (935 CE – 1025 CE) was a Persian Mu'tazili theologian, jurist and hadith scholar who is remembered as the Qadi al-Qudat (Chief Magistrate) of the Buyid dynasty, and a reported follower of the Shafi‘i school. Abd al-Jabbar means "Servant of al-Jabbar (the Almighty)." According to Ibn al-Subki, the Mu'tazila call him "Qadi al-Qudat" (قاضي القضاة) and do not give this title to anyone else.

He was born in Asadabad near Hamadan, Iran. He settled in Baghdad, until he was invited to Rey in 367 AH/978 CE by its governor, Sahib ibn Abbad, a staunch supporter of the Mu'tazila theological movement. He was appointed chief Qadi of the province. On the death of ibn 'Abbad in 995 CE, Abd al-Jabbar was deposed and arrested by the Buyid Amir, Fakhr al-Dawla, because of a slighting remark made by him about his deceased benefactor. He died later in 415 AH/1025 CE.

Qadi ʿAbd al-Jabbar's magnum opus, the Kitab al-mughni fi abwab al-tawhid wa l-ʿadl (Book of the plenitude on the topics concerning unity and justice), often shortened to al-Mughni, is a comprehensive twenty volume "summa" of Mu'tazilite theology of the same magnitude as St. Thomas Aquinas's Summa Theologica and Summa Contra Gentiles. It presented Mu'tazili thought under the two headings of God's oneness (tawhid) and his justice (adl). He argued that the Ash'arite separation between the eternal speech of God and the created words of the Qur'an made God's will unknowable. He and his Mu’tazilite circle were contemporaries of Ibn Sina (better known in the West as Avicenna).

== Works ==
Qadi Abd al-Jabbar was the author of more than 70 books.

- Al-Mughnī Fī Abwāb Al-Tawḥīd wa Al-'Adl (المغني في أبواب التوحيد والعدل)
- Sharḥ to Ibn Khallād's Kitāb al-Uṣūl (which is lost)
- Sharḥ al-Uṣūl al-Khamsa (شرح الأصول الخمسة) ('The Explication of the Five Principles'). (While this is lost, this book received commentaries by two Zaydi authors, which have survived.)

=== Tathbit Dala’il ===
Abd Al-Jabbar produced an anti-Christian polemic text Tathbit Dala’il Nubuwwat Sayyidina Muhammad صلى الله عليه وسلم, (‘The Establishment of Proofs for the Prophethood of Our Master Muhammad صلى الله عليه وسلم’).

=== English translations ===
- Critique of Christian Origins: a parallel English-Arabic text, edited, translated, and annotated by Gabriel Said Reynolds and Samir Khalil Samir, Provo, Utah: Brigham Young University Press, 2010.
