= Amr ibn Ubayd =

8th-century Islamic scholar

Amr Ibn Ubayd

Personal life
- Died: 761 CE / 144 Hijri
- Era: Islamic golden age
- Main interest: Islamic theology

Religious life
- Religion: Islam
- Denomination: Mu'tazila

Muslim leader
- Influenced by: Wasil ibn Ata
- Influenced: Bishr ibn al-Mu'tamir, Abu al-Hudhayl al-'Allaf

Amr Ibn Ubayd ibn Bāb (Arabic: عمرو بن عبيد بن باب, died 761) was one of the earliest leaders in the "rationalist" theological movement of the Mu'tazilism, — 'those who withdraw themselves' — which was founded by Wasil ibn Ata (died 749). He was a student of the famous early theologian Hasan al-Basri, and led the Mu'tazilis during the early years of the Abbasid Caliphate. He generally followed a quietist political stance toward the Abbasid political establishment.

== Life ==
His grandfather had been taken as captive in one of the campaigns of Abd Allah ibn Samora in 663 and again in 665, from either Sind or Kabul, with Amr being variously described as having Sindī or Iranian origin. Amr's father had served as a sergeant under al-Hajjaj, but by profession he was a weaver; Amr had learned the same craft and thus may have made an early acquaintance with Wasil ibn Ata. Their close personal relations are attested by the fact that Wasil married his sister. Doctrinally, they had disagreements in the beginning; Wasil is said to have converted Amr to his Mu'tazilite opinion in a long discussion. More than Wasil, Amr had belonged to the circle of close disciples around Hasan al-Basri, whose Tafsir he transmitted.

=== Rejection of hadiths ===
Amr bin Ubayd was known to have been critical towards hadith. He only accepted mutawatir reports and denied the other narrations. His narrations, some of which include Hasan al-Basri, are rejected and viewed as fabrications (Bid'ah). This is confirmed by the great scholars of Islam, some of them are: Yahya ibn Ma'in, al-Nasa'i, Naim ibn Hammad etc. And from the other hadis books such as Kitâbu’l-Mecrûhîn’ where Hammad bin Zayd talked about how Amr ibn Ubayd used to lie, Hammad ibn Salamah said that Amr ibn Ubayd used to lie upon Hasan al-Basri, Abu Dawud al-Sijistani reported that Amr ibn Ubayd used to lie and his hadiths' are fabrication.

=== Mu'tazila ===
According to the Muslim heresiographers, members of the movement adhered to five principles, which were clearly enunciated for the first time by Abu al-Hudhayl. These were: (1) the unity of God; (2) divine justice; (3) the promise and the threat; (4) the intermediate position; and (5) the commanding of good and forbidding of evil (al-amr bil ma'ruf wa al-nahy 'an al munkar). It is said that when Hasan al-Basri was questioned about the position of the Muslim who committed a grave sin, his pupil Wasil bin 'Ata' said that such a person was neither a believer nor an unbeliever, but occupied an intermediate position. Hasan was displeased and remarked, 'He has withdrawn from us (i'tazila 'anna)', at which Wasil withdrew from his circle and began to propagate his own teaching. The historicity of this story has been questioned on the ground that there are several variants: according to one version the person who withdrew was Amr ibn Ubayd, and according to another the decisive break came in the time of Hasan's successor Qatada ibn De'ama. Moreover, it is noteworthy that at least one influential member of the Basra school, Abu Bakr al-Asamm, rejected the notion of an intermediate position and argued that the grave sinner remained a believer because of his testimony of faith and his previous good deeds. This was also the view of the Ash'arites.

After his master's death, he seems to have contended with Qatada ibn De'ama (died 735) for the leadership of the school. The fact that he lost this competition may explain, to a certain degree, why he became a Mu'tazilte and created a circle of his own. It seems almost certain that Amr did not start playing a major role in the Mu'tazilite movement until after Wasil's death in 749. In about 759 he had to negotiate, as the doyen of the Mu'tazilities, with the caliph al-Mansur concerning the attitude of his adherents toward Nafs az-Zakiya, who had begun propaganda for the cause of the Alids in Iraq. Although there were strong sympathies for Nafs al-Zakiya among the Mu'tazilities (probably not so much because the members of the movement believed in the 'Alid pretendent as the true Mahdi, but because of their frustration with Abbasid rule), Amr ibn Ubayd managed to remain neutral. He died before the outbreak of Nafs al-Zakiya's rebellion.

== See also ==
- Amr (name)
- Obaidullah (disambiguation)
