= Abu Hazim =

Abu Hazim may refer to:

- Salamah ibn Dinar al-Madani, referred to as Abu Hazim, a Hadith narrator
- An alternate name for Abdel Aziz al-Muqrin, a leader of AQAP
- Abu Hazim al-Libi, tortured by the CIA in its black site network
