= Ibn al-Malahimi =

Mutazili and Hanafi theologian

Rukn al-dīn Maḥmūd ibn Muḥammad al-Malāḥimī al-Khuwārazmī

Personal life
- Died: 1141
- Era: Islamic golden age
- Main interest: Uṣūl al-fiqh
- Notable work: al-Fāʾiq fī l-usūl
- Occupation: Scholar of Islam

Religious life
- Religion: Islam
- Denomination: Mu'tazila
- Jurisprudence: Ḥanafī

Muslim leader
- Influenced by: Abu ʾl-Ḥusayn al-Baṣrī
- Influenced: al-Zamakhsharī

Rukn al-dīn Maḥmūd ibn Muḥammad al-Malāḥimī al-Khuwārazmī (died 19 October 1141) was a Khwārazmian Islamic theologian of the Muʿtazilī and Ḥanafī schools. He wrote six works known by title, but of these only one is completely preserved and two partially; the rest are lost.

Ibn al-Malāḥimī was born before 1090 in Khwārazm. He was probably active in Gurgānj, the capital of Khwārazm. In his time, Muʿtazila was popular among the Khwārazmian Ḥanafī, whereas it had been suppressed in most Muslim countries. He initially belonged to the Bahshamiyya branch of Muʿtazila, but adopted the theology of Abu ʾl-Ḥusayn al-Baṣrī after its introduction to Khwārazm. He helped turn the school of al-Baṣrī into a serious rival to the Bahshamiyya in Khwārazm. He taught theology to al-Zamakhsharī, who in turn instructed him in Qurʾanic exegesis.

Ibn al-Malāḥimī was a staunch opponent of metaphysics. He saw in the teachings of Ibn Sīnā a dilution of Islam's prophetic character. Christianity, in his view, was the paradigm of a religion of divine revelation and prophecy compromised by Greek philosophy. He wrote a compendium of the Muʿtazilī theology of al-Baṣrī, The Reliable Book on the Principles of Religion, (Note: Arabic: al-Muʿtamad fī uṣūl ̣al-dīn.) but only the first section and part of another have been preserved. He wrote an abridged version of his compendium, The Excellent Book on the Principles of Religion, (Note: al-Fāʾiq fī l-uṣūl.) completed in December 1137. This work survives complete. In it he mentions two other works (Note: Kitāb al-Ḥudūd and Jawāb al-masāʾil al-Iṣfahāniyya) of his that are not known to have been preserved.

Between 1137 and 1141, Ibn al-Malāḥimī completed a third book, The Gift to the Theologians Concerning the Refutation of the Philosophers, (Note: Tuḥfat al-mutakallimīn fī l-radd ʿalā l-falāsifa.) a comprehensive attack on Hellenistic philosophy, especially those used in the teachings of Ibn Sīnā. For al-Mālahimī, excessive use of Hellenistic philosophy could risk being misused to justify false beliefs, as the Christians do with the Trinity and Incarnation. This work once circulated as far afield as Yemen, but is now lost. His last work, The Abstract, (Note: al-Tajrīd.) is an abridged version of a work by al-Baṣrī on legal method completed by June 1140. It survives in a single incomplete manuscript.

== Editions ==
- Maḥmūd b. Muḥammad al-Malāḥimī (2012). Wilferd Madelung (ed.). Kitāb al-muʿtamad fī uṣūl al-dīn. Tehran: Miras-e Maktoob. doi:10.1163/9789004405974. Published online by Brill, 2019
