= Bishr ibn al-Muʿtamir =

Personal life
- Died: c. 825
- Era: Islamic Golden Age
- Notable idea(s): Bishriyya movement
- Occupation: Muslim philosopher

Religious life
- Religion: Islam
- Creed: Mu'tazili–Zaydite

Abū Sahl Bishr ibn al-Muʿtamir ibn Bishr al-Ḥilālī (died 825) was a Muʿtazilite–Zaydite theologian and founder of the Bishriyya school in Baghdad.

== Life ==
The place of Bishr's birth is unknown. Baghdad, Kūfa and Baṣra have all been proposed. Likewise, the date of his birth is unknown, although he was an old man at his death. He studied Muʿtazilite kalām (theology) in Baṣra under Bishr ibn Saʿīd, Abū ʿUthmān al-Zaʿfarānī and Muʿammar ibn ʿAbbād al-Sulamī. He later moved to Baghdad to teach. Among his most prominent students were Thumāma ibn Ashras and Abū Mūsā al-Murdār.

In Baghdad, Bishr worked as a slave trader. He was an ardent Zaydite missionary, who once promised to convert two people per day, and a staunch advocate of jihad, who financed individual warriors. Caliph Hārūn al-Rashīd (r. 786–809), an opponent of Muʿtazilism, imprisoned Bishr for his alleged Rāfiḍī sympathies. Bishr denied the charge. In prison, he wrote 40,000 verses on justice, monotheism and the threat of judgement. They circulated widely and increased his influence, so the caliph released him. He was a friend of the caliph's vizier, Faḍl ibn Yaḥyā. He later joined the court of the Caliph al-Maʾmūn in Merv. According to al-Qalqashandī, Bishr was a signatory of the 817 decree of the caliph that named ʿAlī al-Riḍā as his successor.

== Works ==
Ibn al-Nadīm attributes 24 titles to Bishr, mostly polemical works. Another 25 titles are cited by other authors. Many of his theological works were in verse. Only two long poems (qaṣīdas) on the wonders of creation, including the lives of insects, are preserved in al-Jāḥiẓ's Ḥayawān. The rest are known only from fragments quoted in other Muʿtazilite works, like al-Khayyāṭ's Kitāb al-Intiṣār. He wrote treatises criticizing his Muʿtazilite colleagues, such as Abū l-Hudhayl, and made attempted refutations of Christianity, Judaism, Kharijism and Zoroastrianism. He wrote, in verse, one of the earliest works intending to prove Muḥammad's prophethood. One of the works Ibn al-Nadīm ascribes to him is a versification of Kalīla wa-Dimna.

Bishr is best known for his concept of the 'engendered act' (tawallud), which refers to the effects engendered or caused by an act of the human will but that are not themselves directly willed. He held humans morally responsible for the effects brought about by their will. He held that the human will was independent of God, which led to accusations of unbelief, although his primary motivation appears to have been to avoid accusing God of evil.

Bishr subscribed to the Zaydite view of the imamate. He regarded ʿAlī as superior among the companions of Muḥammad and accepted his legitimacy, but distinguished superiority from right of succession. He rejected the legitimacy of the last six years of ʿUthmān's caliphate. Politically, he was a Shīʿī. He regarded the Khawārij as rebels.
