= Hammad bin Zayd =

Islamic scholar and hadith narrator (716–795)

Hammad bin Zayd bin Dirham
- Born: 716; Basra, Iraq
- Died: 795; Basra, Iraq

Academic background
- Influences: Thabit al-Bunani, Ayyub al-Sakhtiyani

Academic work
- School or tradition: Sunni Islam
- Main interests: Hadith

Hammad bin Zayd bin Dirham (Arabic: حماد بن زيد بن درهم (716–795)) was an Islamic scholar and jurisprudent from Basrah, Iraq. He was a blind, hujjah (proofed) and an able hadith narrator who memorized all his hadiths well. Hamad did not use tadlis (concealment). He was highly regarded for his knowledge and was considered to be on par with Imam Malik in terms of his scholarly contributions. Hammad bin Zayd was known for his firm stance against the Jahmiyyah, a theological group that held controversial views about the nature of Allah.

== Mention in Abu Hurayra’s narrations ==
According to Al-Khatib al-Baghdadi, Ali ibn al-Madini (d. 849) considered the most authentic chain of a hadith that begin with Abu Hurairah as being Abu Hurairah → Ibn Sirin → Ayyub al-Sakhtiani → Hammad ibn Zaid.

According to Ahmad Muhammad Shakir (d. 1958), a hadith scholar from Al-Azhar University, the most authentic asnād that came from Abu Hurayrah, one of them was:

- Abu Hurairah → Ibn Sirin → Ayyub al-Sakhtiani → Hammad ibn Zaid

== Criticism ==
In the hadith book Kitâbu’l-Mecrûhîn’, Hammad criticized Amr ibn Ubayd, stating that Amr used to lie and fabricated hadiths.

== Death and legacy ==
He died in Basra. There are many hadiths of him in Sahih al-Bukhari. Scholars of hadith generally agree that Hamad ibn Zayd was a reliable narrator.

- Al-Dhahabi said: Hamad used to memorize his hadith like water.
- Abd al-Rahman al-Mahdi says: I have not seen anyone with more knowledge of Sunnah and Hadith than Hammad bin Zayd, he was the best jurist in Basra.
- Ibn Hibban says: Whoever claims that the difference between Hamad bin Zayd bin Dirham and Hamad bin Salama bin Dinar is the difference between a dirham and a dinar is delusional because Hamad bin Zayd was more knowledgeable and correct than Hamad bin Salama. However, Hamad bin Salama was more pious and pious than Hamad bin Zayd.
