= Tawatur =

Concept in Islamic epistemology

Tawātur (Arabic: تواتر) is a concept in Islamic epistemology that refers to the certainty achieved about a piece of information when that information has been shown to have been corroborated to such an extent that it becomes inconceivable for it to have been created through collusion. The idea originated in Greek empiricism, but was imported into and refined within Islamic literature. It was widely used in disciplines including in Islamic philosophy, theology, law, the Quranic and hadith sciences, and grammar. As a technical term, tawātur was first used in circles of rationalists and Mutazilites as early as the ninth century CE. Later, it spread into Ash'arism, Twelver Shi'ism, Sufism, and more. Among those traditions that have been considered to have been transmitted by tawātur include the Quran, the five daily prayers (Salah), tradition that Muhammad flew to Jerusalem on the back of a winged horse in the night (the Isra' and Mi'raj), and Muhammad's miracle of feeding large groups of people from small portions of food and water.

At first, tawātur was not used by the early hadith folk because it was believed that after the application of other methods, the additional evidence from corroboration would only incrementally increase confidence in the authenticity of a report. However, by the eleventh century, tawatur came to be adopted as a response to the pressure from Mu'tazilite skepticism. The term mutawātir (Arabic: متواتر) came to refer to a mass-transmitted hadith, which provided necessary knowledge or was certain in its authenticity. The certainty arises from the belief that the numerous transmitters of the hadith cannot conspire to fabricate the report, nor can they collectively err because it is they who bear the role of preserving the traditions and Sunnah from the time of Muhammad. Formally, a hadith becomes mutawatir when it is thought to passed through a plenitude of transmitters through every level of the isnad (chain of transmitters). A hadith can be considered mutawātir in its exact wording (متواتر اللفظي, mutawātir lafẓi), or in its meaning (متواتر المعنوي, mutawātir maʿnawi). This was the highest classification of a hadith, above mashhūr (مشهور, 'well-known, widespread') and then fard (الفرد; transmissions through one transmitter at a time).

There were many different definitions involved in the precise criteria for applying the method of tawātur. At first, plenty of debate existed over the exact number of independent channels needed to apply tawātur, with values ranging from only two to seventy. As early as the tenth century, some thought that there should be no strict numerical cutoff, and this view eventually dominated. Another question was whether something could be mass-practiced to the point that it could be considered to have been transmitted without tawātur even without a chain of transmitters. Finally, there was a centuries-long debate about whether any hadith at all could be considered mutawātir. Furthermore, several situations occurred where it was argued by some scholars that even a tradition considered mutawātir could be challenged or rejected.

== See also ==
- Hadith studies
- Hadith terminology
- Septuagint — the Greek translation of the Hebrew Bible that, according to Jewish tradition, was created by asking 72 elders to independently write down the Torah of Moses, to which they produced the same result
