= Hammad ibn Salamah =

8th-century Arab grammarian

Personal life
- Died: 167 AH/783 CE
- Era: Abbasid era
- Region: Abbasid Caliphate
- Main interest(s): Hadith, Arabic language

Religious life
- Religion: Islam
- Creed: Sunni, Athari

Muslim leader
- Influenced: Sibawayh

Abu Salma Hammad ibn Salamah ibn Dinar al-Basri (Arabic: حماد بن سلمة بن دينار البصري; died 167 AH/783 CE), the son of Salamah ibn Dinar, was a prominent narrator of hadith and one of the earliest grammarians of the Arabic language. He was noted to have had a great influence on his student, Sibawayh.

He was a client (mawla) of either Banu Tamim or Quraysh. He was from the generation of the Tabi‘ al-Tabi‘in, one of the early generations of Islam.

== Life ==
Ibn Salamah was born roughly in 82 AH (701/702 CE) and died of natural causes in 167 AH (783/784 CE). In hadith, or recorded statements and actions of the Muslim prophet Muhammad, he was a narrator for later scholars Ibn Jurayj, Sufyan al-Thawri and Abdullah ibn Mubarak. His status was considered by many Muslim scholars to be of the highest rank in regard to biographical evaluation, and he is quoted in both Sahih Muslim and Sahih al-Bukhari, the two most significant collections for Sunni Muslims. He is also considered to have been a teacher of both Abu Dawud at-Tayalisi and Yunus ibn Habib.

== Death and legacy ==
- Ibn Hibban says: Whoever claims that the difference between Hamad bin Zayd bin Dirham and Hamad bin Salama bin Dinar is the difference between a dirham and a dinar is delusional because Hamad bin Zayd was more knowledgeable and correct than Hamad bin Salama. However, Hamad bin Salama was more pious and pious than Hamad bin Zayd.
