= Abu al-Hudhayl al-'Allaf =

Muslim philosopher

Personal life
- Born: c. 752 Basra
- Died: c. 841 Samara
- Era: Islamic Golden Age
- Main interest(s): Islamic theology, Islamic philosophy
- Notable idea(s): Islamic rationalism, Mu'tazila atomism, Five principle of Mu'tazila

Religious life
- Religion: Islam
- Denomination: Mu'tazila

Muslim leader
- Influenced by: Wasil ibn Ata, Amr ibn Ubayd
- Influenced: Ibrahim an-Nazzam, Al-Jahiz, Al-Jubba'i, Abd al-Jabbar ibn Ahmad, Abu al-Husayn al-Basri

Abû al-Hudhayl Muhammad ibn al-Hudhayl al-'Abdî, or Abu al-Hudhayl al-‘Allâf (752 CE – 841 CE), was an Mu'tazilite theologian and philosopher. He was one of the early Mu'tazila theologians in the development of Islamic rationalism. Abu al-Hudhayl was one of the philosophers who brought atomism into Islamic philosophy.

Abu al-Hudhayl introduced the concept of atoms as the basis of material ontology. According to him, the universe consists of atoms created by Allah, and the movement is the result of changes in atoms. This theory became the foundation for the development of atomism philosophy in Early Islamic philosophy, especially in Mu'tazilism.
