= Salamah ibn Dinar =

Muslim jurist

Salamah Ibn Dinar al-Madani (died c. 757 or 781), also known as Abu Hazim Al-A'raj, was Muslim ascetic, jurist and narrator of hadith from the taba'een generation who became an important figure for the early Sufis. He is often mentioned in works dealing with spirituality and the Islamic practice of zuhd, or rejection of material comforts to pursue personal contemplation and meditation.

== Biography ==
Of Persian origin Salamah narrated ahadith on the authority of a group of people which included Sahl ibn Sa'd al-Sā'idi, Abi 'Umāma ibn Sahl, Sa'id ibn al-Musayyab, Ibn 'Amrū, and others. He was also the father of Hammad ibn Salamah.

== Legacy ==
=== Quotes ===
Many of Salamah ibn Dinar's words of wisdom and advice for spiritual development have been recorded and contemplated by later generations of Muslims. For example, he is recorded as saying:

Everything which does not bring you to Allah can only bring you to destruction.

If you are satisfied from the life of this world (dunya) with what is sufficient for you, then the minimum is sufficient, But if you are not satisfied with what is sufficient, then nothing can satisfy you.

The goods of the Hereafter are a dead stock now, you should buy as much as you can of them because on the day when they are saleable you can't have anything of them.

Indeed, the servant does good that gladdens him when he does it, and nothing Allāh creates for him of ill is more harmful for him than that. And the servant does ill that ails him when he does it, and nothing Allāh creates for him of good is more beneficial for him than that. That is because the servant, when he does the good that gladdens him, has high expectations through it, and he sees that he has abundance beyond others apart from him; and it may be that Allāh will pull it down, and pull down many actions along with it. And indeed, the servant does an act of ill that ails him when he does it, and Allāh may bring about in him a dread and shame (wajal) until he meets Allāh most high, all the while the fear of it is in his awe, down in his very gut.

=== Sunni view ===
Ahmed, Abū Hātam, al-'Ajali and, al-Nisā'i regarded him as trustworthy. Ibn Khuzayma said: "He (Salamah) was reliable and none in his time was like him." Ibn Sa'd said: "While he (Salamah) was giving legal decisions in the Mosque of Medina, (the caliph) Sulayman ibn Abd al-Malik sent Ibn Shihab al-Zuhri to summon him, but he said to al-Zuhri: 'As he (Sulaymān) has a need with me, let him come to me. As for me, I have no need with him.'"

=== Shi'a view ===
Shaykh al-Tūsi numbered him as one of the companions of the fourth Shia Imam, Zayn al-'Ābidin.
