= Mu'tazilism =

Early Islamic rationalist theological sect

Mu'tazilism (Arabic: المعتزلة, romanized: al-muʿtazila, singular Arabic: معتزلي, romanized: muʿtazilī) was an Islamic theological school that appeared in early Islamic history and flourished in Basra and Baghdad. Its adherents, the Mu'tazilites, were known for their neutrality in the dispute between Ali and his opponents such as Mu'awiya after the death of the third caliph, Uthman. By the 10th century the term al-muʿtazilah had come to refer to a distinctive Islamic school of theology (kalām). This school of theology was founded by Wasil ibn Ata.

The later Mu'tazila school developed an Islamic type of rationalism, based around fundamental principles: the oneness (Tawhid) and justice (Al-'Adl) of God, human freedom of action, and the creation of the Quran. The Mu'tazilites are best known for rejecting the doctrine of the Quran as uncreated and co-eternal with God, asserting that if the Quran is the literal word of God, he logically "must have preceded his own speech". This went against a Sunni position (followed by the Ashʿarī, Māturīdī and Athari) which argued that with God being all-knowing, his knowledge of the Quran must have been eternal, hence uncreated just like him.

The school also worked to resolve the theological "problem of evil", arguing that since God is just and wise, he cannot command what is contrary to reason or act with disregard for the welfare of His creatures. Consequently evil must be regarded as something that stems from errors in human acts (ikhtiyar). While, for misfortunes resulting from natural conditions such as natural disasters, this school believes that it is caused by an autonomous natural mechanism (thabi'a). But, the Mu'tazilism differ from secular and liberal rationalism, Mu'tazila rationalism is basically Islamic theistic rationalism which believed that human intelligence allowed Man to understand that good and evil are rational categories that could be established through reason and revelation.

The Mu'tazila movement reached its political height during the Abbasid Caliphate during the reign of caliph Al-Ma'mun, Al-Mu'tasim and Al-Wathiq who fully supported scientific efforts, which was in line with the peak of the Islamic Golden Age. It also occurred concurrently with the Mihna, an 18-year period (833–851 CE) of religious persecution instituted by caliph Al-Ma'mun, this policy specifically targets Sunni scholars in order to align with state doctrine of Quran createdness, a state doctrine that was even obediently adhered by the Mu'tazila, Murji'ah, Shi'a, Ibadi and Jahmiyya. Until it was reversed by al-Mutawakkil and marking the beginning of a retaliatory persecution of the Mu'tazilites that was far more severely devastating.

In other regions, the Aghlabids (800–909 CE) in Maghreb also adhered to Mu'tazilism, particularly during the period from its initial establishment as an Abbasid vassal state until the end of the Mihna (800–851 CE). Mu'tazilism also revived and developed again to a certain extent during the rule of the Buyids (934–1062 CE) particularly in the region of Rayy. But, the Mu'tazilites once again faced persecution during the rise of Al-Qadir, with the issuance of the Qadiri Creed, which launched a new campaign of persecution against the Mu'tazilites, involving acts of oppression and restrictions that were far more extensive in sociopolitical scope.

Today, Mu'tazilism persists mainly in the Maghreb among those who call themselves the Wasiliyah. Mu'tazilism has significantly influenced the modern Neo-Mu'tazilites and also partly influence the Quranist literary approach to the interpretation of the Qur'an.

== Etymology ==
The name Mu'tazili is derived from the reflexive stem VIII (iftaʿala) of the triconsonantal root ع-ز-ل "separate, segregate, retire", as in اعتزل iʿtazala "to separate (oneself); to withdraw from". The verb iʿtazala is also used to designate a neutral party in a dispute (as in "withdrawing" from a dispute between two factions).

The name is derived from the founder's "withdrawal" from the study circle of Hasan al-Basri over a theological disagreement: Wāṣil ibn ʿAṭā' asked about the legal state of a sinner: is a person who has committed a serious sin a believer or an unbeliever? Hasan answered the person remains a Muslim. Wasil dissented, suggesting that a sinner was neither a believer nor an unbeliever and withdrew from the study circle. Others followed to form a new circle, including ʿAmr ibn ʿUbayd. Hasan's remark, "Wāṣil has withdrawn from us", is said to be the origin of the movement's name. The group later referred to themselves as Ahl al-Tawḥīd wa al-ʿAdl (أهل التوحيد و العدل, "people of monotheism and justice").

== History ==
=== Origin ===
The Mu'tazili appeared in early Islāmic history in the dispute over Alī's leadership of the Muslim community after the death of the third caliph, Uthman. Those who would neither condemn nor sanction Ali or his opponents but took a middle position between him and his opponents at the battle of Siffin and the battle of Jamal were termed the Mu'tazila. By the 10th century CE the term had also come to refer to an Islamic school of speculative theology (kalām) that flourished in Basra and Baghdad (8th–10th century).

According to Sunni sources, Mu'tazili theology originated in the eighth century in Basra (now in Iraq) when Wāṣil ibn ʿAṭā' (died 131 AH/748 AD) left the teaching lessons of Hasan al-Basri after a theological dispute regarding the issue of al-Manzilah bayna al-Manzilatayn (a position between two positions). Although Mu'tazilis later relied on logic and different aspects of early Islamic philosophy and ancient Greek philosophy, the basics of Islam were their starting point and ultimate reference. The accusations leveled against them by rival schools of theology that they gave absolute authority to extra-Islamic paradigms reflect more the fierce polemics between various schools of theology than any objective reality. For instance, most Mu'tazilis adopted the doctrine of creation ex nihilo, contrary to certain Muslim philosophers who, with the exception of al-Kindi, believed in the eternity of the world in some form or another.

Mu'tazili theology faced implacable opposition from Hanbali and Zahiri traditionalists, on the one hand, and from the Ash'ari school (founded by a former Mu'tazili, Abu al Hasan al-Ash'ari) and Maturidi theologians on the other.

=== Ahl al-kalām ===
Scholar Daniel W. Brown describes the Mu'tazila as "the later ahl al-kalām", suggesting the ahl al-kalām were forerunners of the Mu'tazili. The ahl al-kalām are remembered in Islamic history as opponents of Al-Shafi‘i and his principle that the final authority of Islam was the hadith of Muhammad, so that even the Qur'an was "to be interpreted in the light of [the hadith], and not vice versa."

=== Historical development ===
Initially, the Mu'tazilah were founded on a stance of political and theological neutrality, particularly during the era of the Umayyad Caliphate. The Mu'tazilite established their early movement by distancing from the violent factional conflicts surrounding the office of the caliph, Mu'tazilite formulated the theological doctrine known as "A Position Between Two Positions" (Al-Manzilah bayna Al-Manzilatayn) to remain politically unaligned with either the ruling regime or its armed opposition. Although the early Mu'tazila movement was characterized by political quietism, its formulation of concepts regarding justice and reason which established an ethical framework, ultimately drew the attention of the state.

The political integration between the Mu'tazilite and the ruling authority began to manifest most clearly during the reign of Yazid III in 744 CE, while simultaneously distinguishing Yazid III from his predecessors within the Umayyad dynasty. Yazid III adopted an ethical platform heavily inspired by the Mu'tazilism doctrines of justice (Al-'Adl) and accountability. Because Yazid III only held power for a few months amid a crumbling empire, this collaboration functioned more as a fleeting political alignment rather than a permanent institutional shifts, leaving the movement's broader political ambitions unrealized until the Abbasid era.

This intellectual development reached its zenith during the reign of Caliph al-Ma'mun (813–833 CE), particularly after he emerged victorious in the civil war against Al-Amin during the Fourth Fitna (811–813 CE). Under al-Ma'mun’s rule, the Mu'tazilite school of thought was adopted as the official state doctrine, this move was intended to exert control over the various remnants of traditionalist factions that had supported the previous regime. Following the Mu'tazili Abbasid caliph rise to power, the school underwent systematic formalization. Abu al-Hudhayl al-'Allaf (d. 235 AH/849 AD), writing a few generations after early figures Wāṣil ibn Atā and ʿAmr ibn Ubayd, formalized Mu'tazilite theology in Basra. Concurrently, another prominent branch developed in Baghdad under the leadership of Bishr ibn al-Mu'tamir (d. 210 AH/825 AD).

This formalization of Mu'tazilism was not merely a theological shift, but a calculated bureaucratic restructure orchestrated by al-Ma'mun through the strategic consolidation of chief Qadis, Viziers, polymaths, and state administrators. The political framework for this centralization was initially laid by his powerful early Vizier Al-Fadl ibn Sahl, the formidable theologian and state administrator Vizier Thumama ibn Ashras who utilized his ministerial authority to directly embed Mu'tazilism doctrine into the core functions of the state, and later stabilized by Vizier Ahmad ibn Abi Khalid al-Ahwal who rebuilt the diwan (government bureaus) network in Baghdad. When al-Ma'mun launched the Mihna in 833 CE, the chief Qadi Ahmad ibn Abi Du'ad, became an important supervisor in adjudicating Sunni scholars who rejected the Mu'tazilism doctrine of Quranic createdness.

Al-Ma'mun leveraged the vibrant intellectual class at the House of Wisdom (Bayt Al-Hikmah), recruiting brilliant polymaths and scientists who found in the rationalist framework of Mu'tazilism as a state legitimacy for their scientific pursuits. By intertwining the judicial authority of the Qadi, the administrative power of the Vizier, the enforcement of the security apparatus, and the intellectual prestige of the polymaths, the Abbasid court created a highly centralized technocratic systems where intellectual patronage and political survival were inextricably linked. These sociopolitical conditions practically led to the emergence of versatile polymaths and philosophers such as Al-Kindi, Al-Jahiz, Al-Khwarizmi, and Banu Musa, who actively produced scientific works.

=== Mihna ===
The Mihna was a theological inquisition instituted by the Abbasid Caliphate, initiated in 833 CE by Caliph Al-Ma'mun and sustained through the reign of Al-Mu'tasim and Al-Wathiq. This policy mandated that religious scholars, judges, and public officials formally assent to the doctrine that the Quran is created, a core tenet of Mu'tazilite theology which was heavily backed by the court at the time. This policy triggered massive sociopolitical tension across the empire, the central figure of resistance during this period was Ahmad bin Hanbal, he refused to acknowledge that the Quran was created.

Through this Mihna policy, the caliphate sought to reassert control over religious orthodoxy and curb the rising socioreligious influence of the Sunnis which at that time still existed in the form of the Athari and Ahl al-Hadith groups. Meanwhile, many scholars from other groups such as the Murji'ah, Shia, Ibadi, and Jahmiyya were spared from the tribunals because they accepted the doctrine of the Quran createdness, a position aligned with the Mu'tazilite regime at that time. The Mihna policy effectively ended when Al-Mutawakkil officially abolished the policy in 851 CE, marking a reversal in the sociopolitical situation that proved highly detrimental to the Mu'tazilite community in the subsequent era.

=== Post-Mihna ===
Under Caliph al-Mutawakkil (847–861), "who sought to reestablish the traditional Muslim's faith" (he intentionally wanted to restore his legitimacy due to the backlash towards Ahmad ibn Hanbal's persecution under previous Caliphs), Mu'tazilite doctrine was repudiated and Mu'tazilite professors were persecuted in the Abbasid Caliphate; Shia Muslims, Christians and Jews were also persecuted.

The Aghlabids, a semi-autonomous Arab vassal dynasty centered in Ifriqiya from 800 to 909, also adhered to Mu'tazilism, which they imposed as the state doctrine of Ifriqiya (from 830s to 850s). Similarly, the leading elite figures of the Graeco-Arabic translation movement during the reign of ruler of al-Andalus, al-Hakam II were followers of the Mu'tazila. Mu'tazilism also flourished to some extent during the rule of the Buyids in Iraq and Persia.

Severe persecution against the Mu'tazilites occurred during the reign of al-Qadir (r. 991–1031), who issued a decree to kill anyone who openly adhered to the Mu'tazilism and fully supports Sunni Athari-Hanbali as the state’s official orthodoxy. The policy is known as the Qadiri Creed which was implemented starting in 1017/1018 CE and reached its peak in 1029 CE. This is reinforced when Al-Qadir entered into an alliance with Mahmud of Ghazni from the Ghaznavid dynasty who invaded Buyid territories in western Iran. This alliance proved disastrous for the Mu'tazilah community, particularly during the invasion of Rayy, a city that had previously served as a center for the flourishing of Mu'tazilism during the preceding Buyid era. The assault on Rayy took place in 1029 CE, when Ghaznavid forces seized the regional stronghold from the Mu'tazilite scholars. This led to mass executions carried out through public stoning and crucifixion of the theologians and members of their community, as well as the public burning of their extensive libraries. While, books deemed useful were looted and transported to Ghazni and other major Ghaznavid urban centers.

Al-Qadir's policies were continued by his successor, Al-Qa'im (r. 1031–1075 CE). This state of oppression came to an end with the rise of the Seljuks and their victory over the Ghaznavids at the Battle of Dandanqan in 1040 CE, an event that eventually led to the arrival of the Seljuks in Baghdad in 1055 CE. Initially, Seljuk leaders such as Tughril Beg maintained a pro-Mu'tazilite stance, largely due to the influence of his Mu'tazilite vizier, Al-Kunduri. However, that interlude came to an end when Alp Arslan ascended to power, which led to the execution of Al-Kunduri. Then, the establishment of the Nizamiyya Madrasa network by the new vizier Nizam al-Mulk formally positioned Ash'arism theology with Shafi'i and Hanbali jurisprudence as the standards of religious orthodoxy. This shift in religious politics increasingly isolated the Mu'tazila from state, legal, social, and educational institutions.

The decline of the Mu'tazila at the heart of the Abbasid Caliphate compelled its adherents to shift their intellectual activities to Khorasan and Khwarazm during the 11th and 12th centuries. In these eastern regions, scholars such as Al-Zamakhshari (d. 1144 CE) preserved the rationalist theological tradition of the Bahshamiyya branch by compiling Al-Kashshaaf, a work that integrated linguistic analysis of the Qur'an with the doctrine of divine justice. This community survived by merging with followers of the Hanafi jurisprudence. However, the institutional and social existence of the Mu'tazila in Khwarazm was utterly destroyed in the 1220s when the Mongol invasion razed major cities like Urgench and Merv.

To the south, Yemen became the region where Mu'tazili manuscripts and teachings endured the longest. Zaydi Shi'a Imams, such as Al-Hadi ila al-Haqq, adopted Mu'tazili theological frameworks regarding divine justice and rational legal thought as the basis of their official creed. Zaydi scholars transported and recopied the major works of Al-Qadi Abd al-Jabbar including Al-Mughni into the libraries of the Yemeni highlands. However, this assimilation faced resistance in later centuries, local resistance emerged in the 18th and 19th centuries through such as Al-Shawkani (1759–1834), who criticized Zaydi reliance on Mu'tazili dialectical theology and advocated a return to scripture based textualist sources, Al-Shawkani even subsequently shifted from his Zaydi origins to Sunni orthodoxy. Yemeni Zaydi Imams then tended to abandon the rationalist culture of Mu'tazilism and move towards Zaydi orthodoxy, Jarudiyya and Zaydi-Twelver synthesis and even Zaydi-Sunni synthesis. Consequently, while the Mu'tazila ceased to operate as an independent school of thought, leaving behind only neglected Mu'tazilism texts, which were eventually discovered in the 1950s by Egyptian and Western researchers.

== Principles ==
=== The Five Principles ===
According to a "leading Mu'tazilite authority" of the end of the ninth century (al-Khayyat), and "clearly enunciated for the first time by Abu al-Hudhayl", five basic tenets make up the Mu'tazilite creed:

1. monotheism,
2. justice and unity,
3. the inevitability of the threats and promises of God (or "the warning and the promise"),
4. the intermediary position (i.e. Muslims who die without repentance after committing a grave sin are neither mu'mineen (believers), nor kuffar (non-believers), but in an intermediate position known as fasiq),
5. the injunction of right, and the prohibition of wrong.

==== 1. Monotheism ====
All Muslim schools of theology faced the dilemma of affirming divine transcendence and divine attributes, without falling into anthropomorphism on the one hand or emptying scriptural references to those attributes of all concrete meaning.

The doctrine of Tawhīd, in the words of the prominent Mu'tazili scholar Chief Justice Qadi Abd al-Jabbar (died 415 AH/1025 AD) is:

the knowledge that God, being unique, has attributes that no creature shares with him. This is explained by the fact that you know that the world has a creator who created it and that: he existed eternally in the past and he cannot perish while we exist after being non-existent and we can perish. And you know that he was and is eternally all-powerful and that impotence is not possible for him. And you know that he is omniscient of the past and present and that ignorance is not possible for him. And you know that he knows everything that was, everything that is, and how things that are not would be if they were. And you know that he is eternally in the past and future living, and that calamities and pain are not possible for him. And you know that he sees visible things, and perceives perceptibles, and that he does not have need of sense organs. And you know that he is eternally past and in future sufficient and it is not possible for him to be in need. And you know that he is not like physical bodies, and that it is not possible for him to get up or down, move about, change, be composite, have a form, limbs and body members. And you know that he is not like the accidents of motion, rest, color, food or smells. And you know that he is One throughout eternity and there is no second beside him, and that everything other than he is contingent, made, dependent, structured, and governed by someone/thing else. Thus, if you know all of that you know the oneness of God.

==== 2. Divine justice ====
Facing the problem of existence of evil in the world, the Mu'tazilis pointed at the free will of human beings, so that evil was defined as something that stems from the errors in human acts. God does nothing ultimately evil, and he demands not from any human to perform any evil act. If man's evil acts had been from the will of God, then punishment would have been meaningless, as man performed the will of God no matter what he did. Mu'tazilis did not deny the existence of suffering that goes beyond human abuse and misuse of their free will granted to them by God. In order to explain this type of "apparent" evil, Mu'tazilis relied on the Islamic doctrine of taklif: "God does not order/give the soul of any of his creation, that which is beyond its capacity." [Qur'an 2:286]. In conclusion, it comprised life is an ultimate "fair test" of coherent and rational choices, having a supremely just accountability in one's current state, as well as the hereafter.

Humans are required to have belief, iman, secure faith and conviction in and about God, and do good works, amal saleh, to have iman reflected in their moral choices, deeds, and relationship with God, fellow humans, and all of the creation in this world. If everyone is healthy and wealthy, then there will be no meaning for the obligations imposed on humans to, for example, be generous, help the needy, and have compassion for the deprived and trivialized. The inequalities in human fortunes and the calamities that befell them are, thus, an integral part of the test of life. Everyone is being tested. The powerful, the rich, and the healthy are required to use all their powers and privileges to help those who suffer and to alleviate their suffering. In the Qiyamah (Judgment Day), they will be questioned about their response to Divine blessings and bounties they enjoyed in their lives. The less fortunate are required to patiently persevere and are promised a compensation for their suffering that, as the Qur'an puts it in 39:10, and as translated by Muhammad Asad, is "beyond all reckoning".

The test of life is specifically for adults in full possession of their mental faculties. Children may suffer, and are observed to suffer, given the nature of life but they are believed to be completely free from sin and liability. Divine justice is affirmed through the theory of compensation. All sufferers will be compensated. This includes non-believers and, more importantly, children, who are destined to go to Paradise.

The doctrine of 'Adl in the words of ʿAbd al-Jabbar: It is the knowledge that God is removed from all that is morally wrong (qabih) and that all his acts are morally good (hasana). This is explained by the fact that you know that all human acts of injustice (zulm), transgression (jawr), and the like cannot be of his creation (min khalqihi). Whoever attributes that to him has ascribed to him injustice and insolence (safah) and thus strays from the doctrine of justice. And you know that God does not impose faith upon the unbeliever without giving him the power (al-qudra) for it, nor does he impose upon a human what he is unable to do, but he only gives to the unbeliever to choose unbelief on his own part, not on the part of God. And you know that God does not will, desire or want disobedience. Rather, he loathes and despises it and only wills obedience, which he wants and chooses and loves. And you know that he does not punish the children of polytheists (al-mushrikin) in Hellfire because of their fathers' sin, for he has said: "Each soul earns but its own due" (Qur'an 6:164); and he does not punish anyone for someone else's sin because that would be morally wrong (qabih), and God is far removed from such. And you know that he does not transgress his rule (hukm) and that he only causes sickness and illness in order to turn them to advantage. Whoever says otherwise has allowed that God is iniquitous and has imputed insolence to him. And you know that, for their sakes, he does the best for all of his creatures, upon whom he imposes moral and religious obligations (yukallifuhum), and that He has indicated to them what he has imposed upon them and clarified the path of truth so that we could pursue it, and he has clarified the path of falsehood (tariq l-batil) so that we could avoid it. So, whoever perishes does so only after all this has been made clear. And you know that every benefit we have is from God; as he has said: "And you have no good thing that is not from Allah" (Qur'an 16:53); it either comes to us from him or from elsewhere. Thus, when you know all of this you become knowledgeable about justice from God.

==== 3. The Promise and the Threat [al-wa'd wa l-wa'id] ====
This comprised questions of the Last day, or in Arabic, the Qiyamah (Day of Judgment). According to 'Abd al-Jabbar, The doctrine of irreversible Divine promises and warnings, is fashioned out the Islamic philosophy of human existence. Humans, (or insan in Arabic) are created with an innate need in their essence to submit themselves to something. Also, it is seen as an innate need of all humans to pursue an inner peace and contentment within the struggles of an imperfect world. Knowledge of God, truth, and choices, in relation to one's innate need of submission is seen in Islam as the promise and recompense of God (al-thawab) to those who follow. His warning is looked at as a conscious decision by a human submitting themselves, and choosing a varying principle which he had given a clear warning to. He will not go back on his word, nor can he act contrary to his promise and warning, nor lie in what he reports, in contrast to what the Postponers (Murjites) hold.

==== 4. The Intermediate Position [Al-Manzilah bayn al-manzilatayn] ====
That is, Muslims who commit grave sins and die without repentance are not considered as mu’minīn (believers), nor are they considered kafirs (non-believers), but in an intermediate position between the two, (fasiq). The reason behind this is that a mu’min is, by definition, a person who has faith and conviction in and about God, and who has their faith reflected in their deeds and moral choices. Any shortcoming on any of these two fronts makes one, by definition, not a mu’min. On the other hand, one does not become a kafir (i.e. rejecter; non-believer), for this entails, inter alia, denying the Creator—something not necessarily done by a committer of a grave sin. The fate of those who commit grave sins and die without repentance is Hell. Hell is not considered a monolithic state of affairs but as encompassing many degrees to accommodate the wide spectrum of human deeds and choices, and the lack of comprehension associated to The Ultimate Judge (one of the other names in Islam of God.) Consequently, those in the intermediate position, though in Hell, would have a lesser punishment because of their belief and other good deeds. Mu'tazilites adopted this position as a middle ground between Kharijites and Murjites. In the words of ʿAbd al-Jabbar, the doctrine of the intermediate position is the knowledge that whoever murders, or commits zina, or commits serious sins is a grave sinner (fasiq) and not a believer, nor is his case the same that of believers with respect to praise and attributing greatness, since he is to be cursed and disregarded. Nonetheless, he is not an unbeliever who cannot be buried in our Muslim cemetery, or be prayed for, or marry a Muslim. Rather, he has an intermediate position, in contrast to the Seceders (Kharijites) who say that he is an unbeliever, or the Murjites who say that he is a believer.

==== 5. The enjoining of right and prohibiting of wrong ====
These two tenets, like the "intermediate position", follow logically (according to scholar Majid Fakhry) from the basic Mu'tazilite concepts of divine unity, justice and free will, of which they are the logical conclusion. Even though they are accepted by most Muslims, Mu'tazilites give them a specific interpretation in the sense that, even though God enjoins what is right and prohibits what is wrong, the use of reason allows a Muslim in most cases to identify for himself what is right and what is wrong, even without the help of revelation. Only for some acts is the revelation necessary to determine whether a certain act is right or wrong.

== Beliefs ==
=== Methodology of Qur'an interpretation ===
Mu'tazila relied on a synthesis between reason and revelation. That is, their rationalism operated in the service of scripture and Islamic theological framework. They, as the majority of Muslim jurist-theologians, validated allegorical readings of scripture whenever necessary. Justice ʿAbd al-Jabbar (935–1025) said in his Sharh al-Usul al-Khamsa (The Explication of the Five Principles):

إن الكلام متى لم يمكن حمله على ظاهره و حقيقته، و هناك مجازان أحدهما أقرب و الآخر أبعد، فإن الواجب حمله على المجاز الأقرب دون الأبعد، لأن المجاز الأبعد من الأقرب كالمجاز مع الحقيقة، و كما لا يجوز فى خطاب الله تعالى أن يحمل على المجاز مع إمكان حمله على الحقيقة، فكذلك لا يحمل على المجاز الأبعد و هناك ما هو أقرب منه

(When a text cannot be interpreted according to its truth and apparent meaning, and when (in this case) two metaphoric interpretations are possible, one being proximal and the other being distal; then, in this case, we are obligated to interpret the text according to the proximal metaphoric interpretation and not the distal, for (the relationship between) the distal to the proximal is like unto (the relationship between) the metaphor to the truth, and in the same way that it is not permissible, when dealing with the word of God, to prefer a metaphoric interpretation when a discernment of the truth is possible, it is also not permissible to prefer the distal interpretation over the proximal interpretation)

The hermeneutic methodology proceeds as follows: if the literal meaning of an ayah (verse) is consistent with the rest of scripture, the main themes of the Qur'an, the basic tenets of the Islamic creed, and the well-known facts, then interpretation, in the sense of moving away from the literal meaning, is not justified. If a contradiction results from adopting the literal meaning, such as a literal understanding of the "hand" of God that contravenes his transcendence and the Qur'anic mention of his categorical difference from all other things, then an interpretation is warranted. In the above quote, Justice 'Abd al-Jabbar emphatically mentioned that if there are two possible interpretations, both capable of resolving the apparent contradiction created by literal understanding of a verse, then the interpretation closer to the literal meaning should take precedence, for the relationship between the interpretations, close and distant, becomes the same as the literal understanding and the interpretation.

=== Validity of hadith ===
During the Abbasid dynasty, the poet, theologian, and jurist, Ibrahim an-Nazzam founded a madhhab called the Nazzamiyya that rejected the authority of Hadiths by Abu Hurayra. His famous student, Al-Jahiz, was also critical of those who followed such Hadiths, referring to his Hadithist opponents as al-nabita ("the contemptible").

According to Racha El Omari, early Mu'tazilites believed that hadith were susceptible to "abuse as a polemical ideological tool"; that the matn (content) of the hadith—not just the isnad—ought to be scrutinized for doctrine and clarity; that for hadith to be valid they ought to be mutawatir, i.e. supported by tawātur or many isnād (chains of oral transmitters), each beginning with a different Companion.

In writing about mutawatir (multi-isnād Hadith) and ahad (single-isnad hadith, i.e. almost all hadith) and their importance from the legal theoretician's point of view, Wael Hallaq notes the medieval scholar Al-Nawawi (1233–1277) argued that any non-mutawatir hadith is only probable and can not reach the level of certainty that a mutawatir hadith can. However, these mutawir were extremely scarce. Scholars like Ibn al-Salah (died 1245 CE), al-Ansari (died 1707 CE), and Ibn ‘Abd al-Shakur (died 1810 CE) found "no more than eight or nine" hadiths that fell into the mutawatir category.

Wāṣil ibn ʿAṭāʾ (700–748 CE, by many accounts a founder of the Mu'tazilite school of thought), held that there was evidence for the veracity of a report when it had four independent transmitters. His assumption was that there could be no agreement between all transmitters in fabricating a report. Wāṣil's acceptance of tawātur seems to have been inspired by the juridical notion of witnesses as proof that an event did indeed take place. Hence, the existence of a certain number of witnesses precluded the possibility that they were able to agree on a lie, as opposed to the single report which was witnessed by one person only, its very name meaning the "report of one individual" (khabar al-wāḥid). Abū l-Hudhayl al-ʿAllāf (died 227/841) continued this verification of reports through tawātur, but proposed that the number of witnesses required for veracity be twenty, with the additional requirement that at least one of the transmitters be a believer.

For Ibrahim an-Nazzam (c. 775 – c. 845), both the single and the mutawātir hadith reports as narrated by Abu Hurayra, the most prolific hadith narrater, could not be trusted to yield knowledge. He recounted contradictory ḥadīth from Abu Hurayra and examined their divergent content (matn) to show why they should be rejected: they relied on both faulty human memory and bias, neither of which could be trusted to transmit what is true. Al-Naẓẓām bolstered his strong refutation of the trustworthiness of ḥadīths narrated by Abu Hurayra within the larger claim that his ḥadīths circulated and thrived to support polemical causes of various theological sects and jurists, and that no single transmitter could by himself be held above suspicion of altering the content of a single report. Al-Naẓẓām's skepticism involved far more than excluding the possible verification of a report narrated by Abu Hurayra, be it single or mutawātir. His stance also excluded the trustworthiness of consensus, which proved pivotal to classical Mu'tazilite criteria devised for verifying the single report (see below). Indeed, his shunning of both consensus and tawātur as narrated by Abu Hurayra earned him a special mention for the depth and extent of his skepticism.

=== Eschatology ===
One of the "most sharply defined" issues where the Mu'tazila disagreed with "their theological opponents" was whether Paradise and hell (Jahannam) had already been created or if their existence was waiting for Judgement Day. The "majority of the Mu'tazila rejected categorically" the idea that God had already created the Garden and the Fire on the grounds that "the physical universe does not allow for their existence yet". They also argued that because the Qur'an described everything in the universe except God being destroyed (the great fanāʾ) "between the trumpet blasts" before Judgement Day, it would be more sensible to assume that the two abodes of the afterlife would be created after the great fanāʾ.

A number of ḥadīth promise that viewing the face of God (wajh Allah) will be part of the reward of the faithful in paradise. However, the Mu'tazila, aside from their skepticism of ḥadīth, argued that if "God is an immaterial transcendent being", as they believed he was, He was "by definition" not visible.

== Philosophy ==
=== The first obligation ===
Mu'tazilis believed that the first obligation on humans, specifically adults in full possession of their mental faculties, is to use their intellectual power to ascertain the existence of God, and to become knowledgeable of his attributes. One must wonder about the whole existence, that is, about why something exists rather than nothing. If one realises that there is a being who caused this universe to exist, not reliant on anything else and absolutely free from any type of need, then one realizes that this being is all-wise and morally perfect. If this being is all-wise, then his very act of creation cannot be haphazard or in vain. One must then be motivated to ascertain what this being wants from humans, for one may harm oneself by simply ignoring the whole mystery of existence and, consequently, the plan of the Creator. This paradigm is known in Islamic theology as wujub al-nazar, i.e., the obligation to use one's speculative reasoning to attain ontological truths. About the "first duty," ʿAbd al-Jabbar said it is "speculative reasoning (al-nazar) which leads to knowledge of God, because he is not known by the way of necessity (daruratan) nor by the senses (bi l-mushahada). Thus, he must be known by reflection and speculation."

The difference between Mu'tazilis and other Muslim theologians is that Mu'tazilis consider al-nazar an obligation even if one does not encounter a fellow human being claiming to be a messenger from the Creator, and even if one does not have access to any alleged God-inspired or God-revealed scripture. On the other hand, the obligation of nazar towards other Muslim theologians is realized when encountering prophets or scripture. In this case, it was realized with the sending of the last prophet Muhammad and the last holy book, the Quran. In this way, the obligation to nazar is only carried out by studying the Quran and hadith of the prophet Muhammad, and also using the wisdom of the theologians and philosophers who followed him.

=== Reason and revelation ===
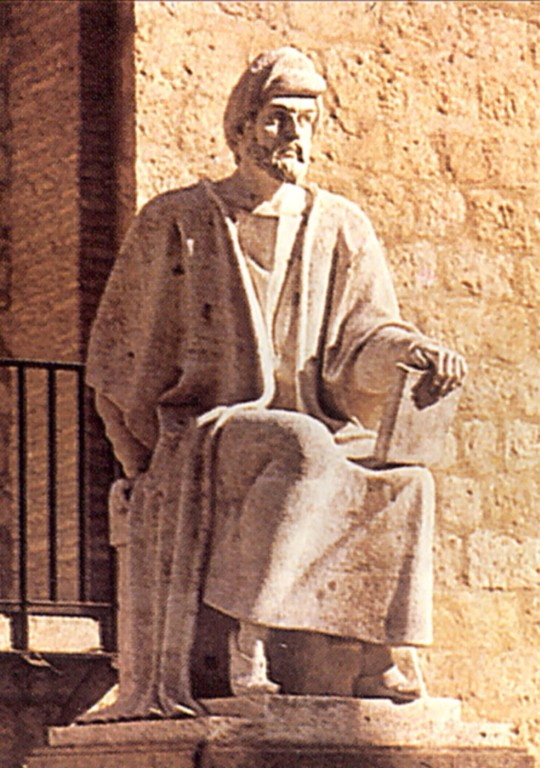
Averroes insisted that all natural phenomena followed laws that God created.

The Mu'tazilis had a nuanced theory regarding reason, Divine revelation, and the relationship between them. They celebrated power of reason and human intellectual power. To them, it is the human intellect that guides a human to know God, his attributes, and the very basics of morality. Once this foundational knowledge is attained and one ascertains the truth of Islam and the Divine origins of the Qur'an, the intellect then interacts with scripture such that both reason and revelation come together to be the main source of guidance and knowledge for Muslims. Harun Nasution in the Mu'tazila and Rational Philosophy, translated in Martin (1997), commented on Mu'tazili extensive use of rationality in the development of their religious views saying: "It is not surprising that opponents of the Mu'tazila often charge the Mu'tazila with the view that humanity does not need revelation, that everything can be known through reason, that there is a conflict between reason and revelation, that they cling to reason and put revelation aside, and even that the Mu'tazila do not believe in revelation. But is it true that the Mu'tazila are of the opinion that everything can be known through reason and therefore that revelation is unnecessary? The writings of the Mu'tazila give exactly the opposite portrait. In their opinion, human reason is not sufficiently powerful to know everything and for this reason humans need revelation in order to reach conclusions concerning what is good and what is bad for them."

The Mu'tazili position on the roles of reason and revelation is well captured by what Abu al-Hasan al-Ash'ari (died 324 AH/935 AD), the eponym of the Ashʿari school of theology, attributed to the Mu'tazili scholar Ibrahim an-Nazzam (died 231 AH/845 AD) (1969):

كل معصية كان يجوز أن يأمر الله سبحانه بها فهي قبيحة للنهي، وكل معصية كان لا يجوز أن يبيحها الله سبحانه فهي قبيحة لنفسها كالجهل به والاعتقاد بخلافه، وكذلك كل ما جاز أن لا يأمر الله سبحانه فهو حسن للأمر به وكل ما لم يجز إلا أن يأمر به فهو حسن لنفسه

No sin may be ordered by God as it is wrong and forbidden, and no sin shall be permitted by God, as they are wrong by themselves. To know about it and believe otherwise, and all that God commands is good for the ordered and all that it is not permissible except to order it is good for himself

In the above formulation, a problem emerged, which is rendering something obligatory on the Divine being—something that seems to directly conflict with Divine omnipotence. The Mu'tazili argument is predicated on absolute Divine power and self-sufficiency, however. Replying to a hypothetical question as to why God does not do that which is ethically wrong (la yaf`alu al-qabih), 'Abd al-Jabbar replied: Because he knows the immorality of all unethical acts and that he is self-sufficient without them...For one of us who knows the immorality of injustice and lying, if he knows that he is self-sufficient without them and has no need of them, it would be impossible for him to choose them, insofar as he knows of their immorality and his sufficiency without them. Therefore, if God is sufficient without need of any unethical thing it necessarily follows that he would not choose the unethical based on his knowledge of its immorality. Thus every immoral thing that happens in the world must be a human act, for God transcends doing immoral acts. Indeed, God has distanced himself from that with his saying: "But Allah wills no injustice to his servants" (Qur'an 40:31), and his saying: "Verily Allah will not deal unjustly with humankind in anything" (Qur'an 10:44).

The thrust of ʿAbd al-Jabbar's argument is that acting immorally or unwisely stems from need and deficiency. One acts in a repugnant way when one does not know the ugliness of one's deeds, i.e., because of lack of knowledge, or when one knows but one has some need, material, psychological, or otherwise. Since God is absolutely self-sufficient (a result from the cosmological "proof" of his existence), all-knowing, and all-powerful, he is categorically free from any type of need and, consequently, he never does anything that is ridiculous, unwise, ugly, or evil. The conflict between Mu'tazilis and Ash'aris concerning this point was a matter of focus. Mu'tazilis focused on divine justice, whereas the Ashʿaris focused on divine omnipotence. Nevertheless, Divine self-restraint in Mu'tazili discourse is part of divine omnipotence, not a negation of it.

=== Causality ===
Mu'tazilism prioritizes the principle of causality in answering all causes that occur in the universe and the world. So for Mu'tazilah all events that occur in the universe are not destiny that is solely driven entirely by God, as a rejection of Jabriyya theology. This is correlated with humans, whose deeds will be counted based on their actions and behavior, so humans themselves create their actions and behavior through free will that is formulated and run by the brain and nervous system.

So in this case Mu'tazilism opposes forms of fatalism and occasionalism that are often mixed with elements of Islamic religion by other Islamic theological schools. Some elements of the concept of fatalism and occasionalism are adopted by Islamic theological schools such as Ash'arism and Maturidism who are opponents of Mu'tazilite.

=== Atomism ===
Mu'tazilite view of the universe is supported by the doctrine of atomism. This is the belief that all things and processes can be reduced to fundamental physical particles and their composition. Mu'tazilite atomism however did not imply determinism. Mu'tazila atomism also basically has several differences with Greek atomism, in this case the Mu'tazilah uses atomism to strengthen the concept of responsibility, causality, divine justice and monotheism within the framework of kalām.

Abu al-Ḥudhayl al-ʿAllāf asserted that a single atom could aggregate with two or more atoms through the mediation of an accident (taʾlīf) that gives rise to a physical dimension that can be seen and measured. Each atom is essentially homogeneous (there is no intrinsic difference between atoms), but they can differ in quantity and spatial position. The concept of accidents (ḥalq) in Muʿtazilite atomism is understood as entities that are separate from the atoms themselves. That is, when an atom appears to move or undergo a change in quality, it is not due to any internal force within the atom, but rather because of the presence of the accident of “motion” (ḥaraka) in the source atom and the accident of “rest” (sukūn) in the destination atom at each moment in time. Furthermore, to explain how atoms combine to form cohesive bodies, the Muʿtazilah proposed the concept of the accident taʾlīf (junction), which adheres to a group of atoms and thereby distinguishes between unified entities that are hard to separate (e.g., solid bodies) and those that are easily disassembled (e.g., water). However, there was disagreement among them as to whether this accident adheres to a single atom or to the aggregate of atoms as a whole.

Another debate concerned the nature of space and void. The Muʿtazilah questioned whether there exists a vacuum between two adjacent atoms. Some schools, such as the Basrian Muʿtazilite, asserted that internal void is necessary to allow atomic motion, since atoms cannot penetrate each other without “space” between them. Other views held that a medium such as air (which is also composed of fine atoms) suffices to explain movement without the need for absolute void. In this context, they also debated whether space itself is continuous or distributed like matter: some argued that space must be distributed similarly to atoms, so that an atom cannot occupy the junction point of two other atoms; others accepted the possibility of the continuity of space to explain how “two atoms can be adjacent to another atom” without invoking a void.

== Legacy ==
Today, Mu'tazilism persists mainly in the Maghreb among those who call their aqidah the Wasili. Referring to Wasil ibn Ata, the reputed founder of Mu'tazila, the movement primarily uses the mantle of the Mu'tazila as an identity marker. Mu'tazilism has also influenced the Quranist movement and the Neo-Mu'tazila literary approach to the interpretation of the Qur'an.

The "Ankara School" was characterised by historical criticism and a revivification of Mu'tazilite rationality. The origin of its approach is traced to the 1980s, when Edip Yüksel, invoking critical hadith studies to question the reliability of the sunnah's transmission, proposed a Quran-only formula.

The Arab Islamic philosopher Ismail al-Faruqi, widely recognised by his peers as an authority on Islam and comparative religion, was deeply influenced by the Mu'tazila.

The pan-Islamist revolutionary Jamal al-Din al-Afghani was noted for embracing Mu'tazilite views. His student Muhammad Abduh (1849–1905) was one of the key founding figures of Islamic Modernism that contributed to a revival of Mu'tazilite thought in Egypt, although he himself does not seem to have called himself a Mu'tazilite. After he was appointed Grand Mufti of Egypt in 1899, he attempted to adapt Islam to the modern times and to introduce changes in the teachings at Al-Azhar University. Although his reforms were disputed by traditional Sunni establishment as well as his immediate successors such as Muhammad Rashid Rida (1865–1935 C.E), 'Abduh would become the chief source of inspiration for later modernist and reformist scholars and philosophers such as Fazlur Rahman (1919–1988), Farid Esack (born 1959), and in particular Harun Nasution (1919–1998) and Nasr Abu Zayd (1943–2010).

The Association for the Renaissance of Mu'tazilite Islam (French: Association pour la renaissance de l’Islam mutazilite, ARIM) was founded in France in February 2017 by Eva Janadin and Faker Korchane.

In contemporary Salafi jihadism, "Mu'tazilite" is used as an epithet by rival groups hoping to undermine each other's credibility. The North African "Institute for the Faith Brigades" denounced Bin Laden's "misguided errors" and accused Abu Hafs al Mawritani, a leading figure in Al-Qaeda's juridical committee, of being a Mu'tazilite.

== Bibliography ==
- 'Abd al-Jabbar (1965). 'Abd al-Karim 'Uthman (ed.). Sharh al-Usul al-Khamsa (in Arabic). Cairo: Maktabat Wahba.
- Brown, Daniel W. (1996). Rethinking tradition in modern Islamic thought. Cambridge University Press. ISBN 0521570778.
- Abu al-Hasan al-Ash'ari (1969). M. M. 'Abd al-Hamid (ed.). Maqalat al-Islamiyin wa Ikhtilaf al-Musallin (in Arabic). Cairo: Maktabat al-Nahdah al-Misriyah.
- Cooperson, Michael (2005). Al-Ma'mun (Makers of the Muslim World). Oxford, England: Oneworld Publications. ISBN 1-85168-386-0.
- Craig, W. L. (2000). The Kalam Cosmological Argument. USA: Wipf & Stock Publishers. ISBN 1-57910-438-X.
- Ess, J. V. (2006). The Flowering of Muslim Theology. USA: Harvard University Press. ISBN 0-674-02208-4.
- Gimaret, D. (1979). "Les Usul al-Hamsa du Qadi 'Abd al-Jabbar et leurs commentaires". Annales Islamologiques. 15: 47–96. doi:10.3406/anisl.1979.979. S2CID 259055137.
- Jackson, S. A. (2002). On the Boundaries of Theological Tolerance in Islam: Abu Hamid al-Ghazali's Faysal al-Tafriqa. Studies in Islamic Philosophy, V.1. Oxford: Oxford University Press. ISBN 0-19-579791-4.
- Jackson, S. A. (2005). Islam and the Blackamerican: Looking Toward the Third Resurrection. New York: Oxford University Press. ISBN 0-19-518081-X.
- Martin, R. C.; M. R. Woodward; D. S. Atmaja (1997). Defenders of Reason in Islam: Mu'tazilism from Medieval School to Modern Symbol. Oxford, England: Oneworld Publications. p. 27. ISBN 978-1851681471.
- Nawas, J. A. (1994). "A Rexamination of Three Current Explanations for al-Ma'mun's Introduction of the Mihna". International Journal of Middle East Studies. 26 (4): 615–629. doi:10.1017/S0020743800061134. S2CID 159973328.
- Nawas, J. A. (1996). "The Mihna of 218 A.H./833 A. D. Revisited: An Empirical Study". Journal of the American Oriental Society. 116 (4): 698–708. doi:10.2307/605440. JSTOR 605440.
- Walzer, R. (1967). "Early Islamic Philosophy". In A. H. Armstrong (ed.). The Cambridge History of Later Greek and Early Medieval Philosophy. UK: Cambridge University Press. ISBN 0-521-04054-X.
- Aqeedah 11, An Exposition of Some Schools, Movements and Sects of Islam. West Coast Demarara, Guyana: Guyana Islamic Institute.
