= Wasil ibn Ata =

Muslim theologian

- واصل بن عطاء
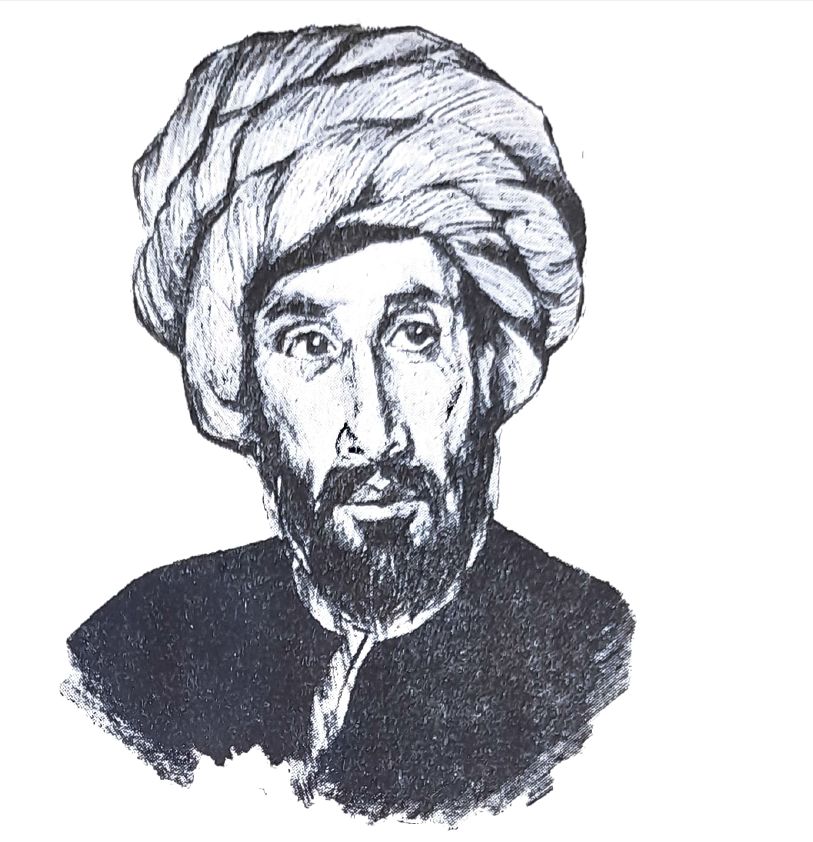
- A sketch representing Wasil ibn Ata from a book entitled Sayr mulhimah: min al-Sharq wa-al-Gharb by unknown author, 1961

Personal life
- Born: c. 699 Medina, Arabia
- Died: c. 748
- Era: Islamic Golden Age
- Region: Arabian Peninsula
- Main interest: Islamic theology
- Notable idea(s): Rationalism in Islamic theology, Founder of Muʿtazila, Free will of humans, Indeterminism, Incompatibilism, Anti-anthropomorphism
- Occupation: Muslim philosopher

Religious life
- Religion: Islam
- Denomination: Mu'tazila

Muslim leader
- Influenced by: Hasan al-Basri, Ja'far al-Sadiq, Ma'bad al-Juhani, Abd-Allah ibn Muhammad ibn al-Hanafiyyah, Ghailan ad-Dimashqi
- Influenced: Amr ibn Ubayd, Othman ibn Khaled al-Tawil, Abu al-Hudhayl al-'Allaf, Abd al-Jabbar ibn Ahmad

Wasil ibn Ata (Arabic: واصل بن عطاء) (699–748), also known as al-Ghazzal al-Althagh (Arabic: الغزّال الألثغ, lit. 'the spinner with a lisp'), was a Muslim theologian and jurist. He is considered to be the founder of the Mu'tazilite school of Aqidah and Kalam.

== Biography ==
Born in 699 in the Arabian Peninsula, he initially studied under Abd-Allah ibn Muhammad ibn al-Hanafiyyah, the grandson of Ali. Later, Wasil would travel to Basra in Iraq to study under Hasan al-Basri (one of the Tabi'in). In Basra, he began to develop the ideologies that would lead to the Muʿtazilite school. He married Amr ibn Ubayd's sister.

Wasil's thoughts and solutions stem from the conflicts experienced by many scholars in resolving theological and political problems. His main contribution to the Muʿtazilite school was planting the seeds for the formation of its doctrine. He died in 748 in the Arabian Peninsula.

== See also ==
- Rationalist theology
- Islamic scholars
