= Sharaf al-Din al-Dimyati =

13th-century Egyptian Islamic scholar

Imam Al-Dimyāṭī
- الدمياطي
- Title: Sharaf al-Din; Al-Ḥāfiẓ

Personal life
- Born: 1217 Tunah Island near Damietta
- Died: 1306 (aged 88–89) Cairo
- Era: Late Ayyubid and early Mamluk periods
- Region: Egypt
- Main interest: Hadith
- Occupation: Muhaddith, Scholar

Religious life
- Religion: Islam
- Denomination: Sunni
- Jurisprudence: Shafi'i
- Creed: Ash'ari

Muslim leader
- Influenced by: Al-Shafi'i Abu Hasan al-Ash'ari Abu Tahir al-Silafi Ibn Asakir Al-Mundhiri Izz al-Din ibn 'Abd al-Salam Ibn al-Hajib
- Influenced: Ibn al-Adim Al-Yunini Al-Nuwayri Abu Hayyan al-Gharnati Fath al-Din Ibn Sayyid al-Nas Jamal al-Din al-Mizzi Al-Dhahabi Taqi al-Din al-Subki

Sharaf al-Din al-Dimyati (Arabic: شرف الدين الدمياطي), commonly known as Al-Dimyāṭī (Arabic: الدمياطي; 705-613 AH/ 1217–1306 CE) was regarded as the leading traditionist in Egypt in the 13th century. Young man who explored throughout the Middle East in pursuit of prophetic traditions later settled in Cairo and began teaching at the most prestigious institutions.

== Political Climate ==
Between the beginning of the seventh century of the Hijrah and the beginning of the eighth century, al-Dimyati lived his entire life. During this time, there were several deadly incidents that affected the Islamic world to the fullest extent possible. The fall of the Islamic Caliphate in Baghdad in 656 A.H. and the Tatar, Mongol, and Crusader attacks that followed on the Islamic countries were the most dangerous catastrophe.

This time period was defined by a group of renowned jurists and ulama who were the contemporaries of Al-Hafiz al-Dimyati and these include Izz al-Din ibn 'Abd al-Salam, Al-Mundhiri, Ibn al-Salah, Al-Nawawi, Ibn Daqiq al-'Id, Nasir al-Din al-Tusi, Al-Yunini, Ibn Taymiyyah, and Ibn Khalikan were a few of these individuals. Another set of ulama who studied under these individuals and lived in their time then emerged. They included Jamal al-Din al-Mizzi, Alam al-Din al-Birzali, Al-Dhahabi, Taqi al-Din al-Subki, and Salah al-Din al-Ala'i.

Through their legal fatwas, opinions, significant writings, and active participation in all matters that affected the rulers and authorities in the Islamic world at the time, these ulama had a significant influence on the political incidents and general conditions that characterised this era. By doing this, they contributed to the unity of Muslims, the joining of their ranks, the mobilisation of their forces, the raising of their religious flag, and the defence of their shariah and their edicts.

== Early life ==
=== Birth ===
He was born in a village of an island of Tunah between Tanis and Damietta at the end of 613 A.H/1216 C.E.

=== Education ===
He was raised in Damietta, one of Egypt's significant border towns. The two scholars who taught him Hadith and Qira'at were Abu al-Marakim 'Abdullah and Abu Abdillah al-Husayn, both of whom were sons of Mansur as-Sa'di. He learned his madhab at this city. After his teacher was observing that he was restricting himself to studying law and the principles of law based on the school of Imam al-Shafi'i, Shaykh Abu Abdilllah urged him to study Hadith. He started learning Hadith when he was 23 years old.

He travelled to Alexandria in the year of 636A.H/1238 C.E and studied there under a sizable number of ulama, particularly under the students of Al-Hafiz Abu Tahir al-Silafi. He next travelled to Cairo to continue his Hadith studies. In that city, he met with the most eminent Hadith scholar of his time, Al-Hafiz Al-Mundhiri and extensively studied Hadith under him. He performed Hajj in 643 C.E/1245 A.H, during which he joined the groups of notable religious figures who had established their centres of learning in Mecca and Medina. After spending two years studying in Hejaz, he came back to Egypt and continued his educational journey throughout Syria and Iraq. He studied under the local ulama throughout these travels, and he profited from their company. He also received education from ulama from Damascus, Aleppo, and Hama. He studied at Damascus under the students of Al-Hafiz Ibn Asakir and continued to hang out with Al-Hafiz Abu al-Hajjaj Yusuf ibn Khalil in Aleppo. He also went to Baghdad and Maridin. He related 40 Ahadith from al-Musta'sim, the last of the Baghdad-based Abbasi caliphs, while he was there.

=== Teachers ===
His teachers were numerous; according to al-Ḥāfiẓ Ibn Ḥajar al-ʿAsqalānī, he studied under around 2,250 scholars and directly heard hadith from them. Among his most influential teachers were ʿIzz al-Dīn ibn ʿAbd al-Salām, from whom he studied Shāfiʿī jurisprudence, and Ibn al-Ḥājib, under whom he studied Arabic grammar. However, his most formative influence in hadith was al-Mundhirī, whom al-Dimyāṭī described as “my teacher and the one who transmitted hadith to me. I came to him as a beginner and left him as one who could repeat the hadith back to him.” This reflects the central role al-Mundhirī played in his development as a hadith scholar.

== Scholarly career ==
=== Scholastic specialization ===
Although al-Dimyati was best known for his contribution in Hadith science, he was well-versed in a number of fields and was a popular prolific writer. He was a jurist who published books on Islamic law. He was a theologian who authored books on Islamic theology. He was a linguist and philologist who wrote books on language, linguistics, and philology. He was a genealogist and an expert in tracing the ancestry of old Arab tribes, especially Banu Aws and Banu Khazraj, to which he devoted an entire book. He wrote a book on zoology and dedicated an entire book for horses entitled Fadl al-Khayl (Superiority of Horses) which gained popularity throughout the medieval world.

=== Positions ===
Throughout al-Dimyati's life, he had a number of respectable, prestigious, and notable jobs. He was fairly rich and held high-profile academic posts, like being the professor of Zahiriyyah and Mansuriyyah. His abilities, notably his extraordinary memory, allowed him to hold a leading position as the religious authority, and the extensive list of his writings demonstrates that he spent the majority of his time imparting religious doctrine and Hadith.

=== Students ===
The following are some of the well-known ulama who studied under Al-Dimyati:

- Ibn al-Adim
- Al-Yunini
- Qadi 'Alam al-Din al-Akhna'i
- 'Alam al-Din al-Qunawi
- Al-Nuwayri
- Abu Hayyan al-Gharnati
- Fath al-Din Ibn Sayyid al-Nas
- Alam al-Din al-Birzali
- Jamal al-Din al-Mizzi
- Al-Dhahabi
- Taqi al-Din al-Subki (Who was his most remarkable student, who was the last of the Muhaddithun to remain in his company, and who stayed the longest.)

== Death ==
Al-Dimyati dedicated his entire life to writing, learning, and imparting information, particularly in the domains of Hadith sciences. According to Ibn Hajar, he carried on doing this until his abrupt death, which occurred while he was ascending the steps to his home and losing consciousness. According to Ibn Tughri Burdi, he mysteriously died in Cairo after offering the Asr prayer. At the spot where he prayed, he lost consciousness. He was taken inside, where he shortly died. This occurred on Sunday, Dhul Qa'dah 15th, 705 A.H. He was laid to rest in Bab an-Nasr cemetery. In Damascus, a Janazah prayer was performed for him.

== Character ==
He was noted as being neatly dressed with a white beard, frequently smiling and was noted for being eloquent in speech, a fast reader, and skilled in writing. He was portrayed as sociable, charitable in his judgements of others, and devote to his religious practice..

== Reception ==
Taj al-Din al-Subki said: "He was the Hafiz of his time, a master in knowledge of lineages, the leader of the scholars of Hadith whose greatness is unanimously accepted, and who combined both narrating and the understanding of Hadith through strong chains and narrators."

Salah al-Din ibn Shakir al-Kutbi said: "He is the eminent Imam, the renowned and excellent hafiz [of Hadith], the proof, the flag of the scholars of Hadith, and the choice of assessors [of Hadith]."

Jamal al-Din al-Mizzi says: "I have not seen anyone with a better memory than him."

Alam al-Din al-Birzali says: He was the last of the Huffaz, the scholars of hadith, the narrators of lofty Traditions, and those of profound intelligence."

Al-Dhahabi says: "He is the Allamah, the hafiz, the proof, one of the leading imams, and from among the last assessors of Hadith."

Abu Hayyan al-Gharnati describes him as: "The Hafiz of the East and West."

== Works ==
Several of al-Dimyati's written works were mentioned in the biographical sources. Some of them are familiar to us, while others are completely unknown to us. It's likely that he owned further books that his biographers failed to mention or that the libraries were unaware of. His well-known works are listed below:

1. Akhbār ʿAbd al-Muṭṭalib ibn ʿAbd Manāf ("Reports about ʿAbd al-Muṭṭalib ibn ʿAbd Manāf")
2. Akhbār Banī Nawfal ("Reports about the Banu Nawfal")
3. Al-Arbaʿūn al-Abdāl fī Tasāʿiyāt al-Bukhārī wa-Muslim ("The Forty Substitutes in the Chains of Nine Narrators in al-Bukhārī and Muslim")
4. Al-Arbaʿūn al-Ḥalliyya fī al-aḥkām al-nabawiyya ("The Forty Adorned [Narrations] in Prophetic Rulings")
5. Al-Arbaʿūn fī al-Jihād ("The Forty [Hadiths] on Jihad")
6. Al-Arbaʿūn al-Mubānā bi-l-Isnād al-Mukharraja ʿalā al-Saḥīḥ min Hadīth Ahl al-Baghdād ("The Forty Clarified with Chains and Extracted from the Authentic Hadiths of the People of Baghdad")
7. Al-Arbaʿūn al-Sughrā ("The Lesser Forty [Hadiths]")
8. Al-Tasallī wa-l-ightibāṭ bi-Thawāb man Taqaddam min al-Afrāṭ ("Comfort and Joy in the Reward of Those Who Passed Away Among Children")
9. Juzʾ Fīhi Aḥādīth ʿAwālī wa-Abdāl wa-Muwāfaqāt wa-Tasāʿiyāt wa-Muṣāḥafāt wa-Anāshīd wa-Muqattaʿāt ("A Treatise Containing Elevated Chains, Substitutes, Agreement Narrations, Chains of Nine, Scribal Errors, Chants, and Fragments")
10. Dhikr Azwāj al-Nabī ṣallá Allāh ʿalayhi wa-sallam wa-Awlādihi wa-Asāfihi ("Mention of the Wives, Children, and Servants of the Prophet ﷺ")
11. Al-Sīrah al-nabawiyyah ("The Prophetic Biography")
12. Al-ʿAqd al-Thamīn fī Ismi man Ismuhu Mithl al-Muʾmin ("The Precious Necklace on Those Whose Name is like 'al-Muʾmin'")
13. Faḍl al-Khayl ("The Virtue of Horse")
14. Qabāʾil al-Khazraj ("The Tribes of Khazraj")
15. Al-Daʿāmah al-Tāsiʿah fī al-Muwāfaqāt wa-l-ibdāl al-ʿāliyyah ("The Ninth Pillar on Agreements and Elevated Substitutions")
16. Al-Mukhtabar al-Rābiʿ fī Thawāb al-ʿAmal al-Sāliḥ ("The Fourth Laboratory on the Rewards of Righteous Deeds")
17. Al-Majālis al-Baghdādiyya ("The Baghdadi Sessions")
18. Al-Majālis al-Dimashqiyya ("The Damascene Sessions")
19. Mukhtaṣar fī sīrat Sayyid al-Bashar ("Abridgment of the Biography of the Master of Mankind")
20. Muʿjam shuyūkh al-Dimyāṭī ("Biographical Dictionary of the Teachers of al-Dimyāti"), it's 3 volumes only, located in the Azhar Library.
21. Ḥawāshī ʿalá al-Bukhārī("Marginal Notes on al-Bukhārī")
22. Ḥawāshī ʿalá Muslim ("Marginal Notes on Muslim")

== See also ==
- List of Ash'aris
