= Ibn al-Munayyir =

13th-century Islamic scholar

Imam Ibn al-Munayyīr
- ابن المنير
- Title: Fakhr al-Miṣr; Qadi al-Qudat; Nāṣir al‑Dīn; Al-Ḥāfiẓ

Personal life
- Born: 1223 Alexandria
- Died: 1284 (aged 60–61) Alexandria
- Era: Late Ayyubid and early Mamluk periods
- Region: Egypt
- Main interest(s): Islamic jurisprudence, Hadith, Tafsir, Arabic grammar, Rhetoric, Islamic theology
- Notable work(s): Al-Baḥr al-Kabīr fī Nukhab al-Tafsīr; Munāsabāt ʿalā Tarājim al-Bukhārī
- Occupation: Jurist, Scholar, Hadith scholar, Quranic exegete, Grammarian, Rhetorician, Theologian

Religious life
- Religion: Islam
- Denomination: Sunni
- Jurisprudence: Maliki
- Creed: Ash'ari

Muslim leader
- Influenced by: Al-Shafi'i Abu al-Hasan al-Ash'ari Izz al-Din ibn 'Abd al-Salam Ibn al-Hajib al-Mundhiri
- Influenced: Abu Hayyan al-Gharnati

Nāṣir al‑Dīn Abū al‑Abbās Aḥmad ibn Muḥammad ibn Manṣūr ibn Abī al‑Qāsim al‑Judhāmī al‑Iskandarī (Arabic: ناصر الدين أبي العباس أحمد بن محمد بن منصور بن أبي القاسم الجذامي الإسكندري); commonly known as Ibn al-Munayyīr (Arabic: ابن المنير; 620–683 AH/ 1223–1284 CE) was a celebrated Sunni Egyptian scholar, Mālikī jurist, hadith scholar, Qurʾānic exegete, grammarian, rhetorician, theologian, preacher (khāṭib), and judge (qāḍī) based in Alexandria during the late Ayyubid and early Mamluk periods. He is often mentioned alongside Ibn Daqīq al-ʿĪd and Shihāb al‑Dīn al‑Qarāfī as one of the three foremost scholars in Egypt of his era.

== Lineage ==
His family lineage, indicated by al-Judhami, traces back to a tribe settled in the Levant (Shām).

== life ==
Born in 620 AH (1223 CE), Ibn al-Munayyir received his early education from his father and from Abū Bakr ʿAbd al-Wahhāb al-Ṭūsī, a student of the famed traditionist al-Silafī. He went on to study under some of the most celebrated scholars of his time, including ʿIzz al-Dīn ibn ʿAbd al-Salām and the jurist and grammarian Ibn al-Ḥājib. He memorized both of Ibn al-Ḥājib's abridgments—one in fiqh and the other in uṣūl al-fiqh—and received authorization (ijāzah) to issue legal opinions (fatwas). He also studied under the luminary hadith scholar, al-Mundhiri.

Professionally, Ibn al-Munayyir taught at major centers of learning in Alexandria, including the Juyūshī Mosque where he handled educational responsibilities in grammar, rhetoric, and theology. He held positions as supervisor of religious endowments, as preacher, and later as judge. He was first appointed deputy judge under Qāḍī Ibn al-Tunsī in 651 AH, and later served twice as the chief judge (Qadi al-Qudat) and preacher of Alexandria. His tenure, however, was not without turbulence. He was dismissed and reinstated more than once. Among his notable students were Ibn Rashid al-Qadi, Tāj al-Dīn al-Fākihānī and Abū Ḥayyān al‑Gharnāṭī.

Ibn al-Munayyir died by poisoning on a Friday in early Rabi‘ al-Awwal 683 AH (May 1284 CE) at the age of 63. He was buried next to his father at the Western Mosque (al-Jāmi‘ al-Gharbī) in Alexandria.

== Legacy ==
Ibn al-Munayyir's integration of balāgha (rhetoric) into tafsīr within a firmly Sunni framework left a lasting mark on the development of Qurʾānic exegesis. His most influential work in this regard, al-Intiṣāf min al-Kashshāf, sought to preserve the rhetorical brilliance of al-Zamakhsharī's commentary while refuting its Muʿtazilī theological elements.

Beyond tafsīr, Ibn al-Munayyir is considered a pioneer in the structural and thematic study of Ṣaḥīḥ al-Bukhārī. His work al-Mutawari ʿalā Abwāb al-Bukhārī is among the earliest to examine the wisdom behind al-Bukhārī's chapter arrangements, predating later works by scholars such as Ibn Ḥajar and al-Kandahlawī. This contribution places him at the forefront of an emerging subgenre in hadith studies focused on chapter-title coherence (munāsabāt al-abwāb).

His extensive and diverse knowledge earned him widespread recognition, leading scholars of his time to regard him as Fakhr al-Miṣr (the Pride of Egypt). The prominent jurist ʿIzz al-Dīn ibn ʿAbd al-Salām famously remarked, “Egypt boasts two great men on its ends: Ibn al-Munayyīr in Alexandria and Ibn Daqīq al-ʿĪd in Qūṣ.” Ibn Farḥūn, in his Ṭabaqāt al-Mālikiyyīn, lists him among the foremost figures of the Maliki school.

== Works ==
He authored numerous influential works across multiple disciplines:

- Al-Baḥr al-Kabīr fī Nukhab al-Tafsīr ("The Great Ocean of Selected Exegesis"), a Qur'anic commentary described as an “ocean of selected exegesis,” noted for its depth, literary brilliance, and theologically grounded interpretation.
- Munāsabāt ʿalā Tarājim al-Bukhārī ("The Subtle Commentary on the Chapter Headings of al-Bukhārī"), it is regarded as one of the earliest systematic works exploring the structure and reasoning behind the chapter headings of Ṣaḥīḥ al-Bukhārī. Ibn al-Munayyir is considered a pioneer in this field, anticipating later works by scholars like Ibn Ḥajar and al-Kandahlawī.
- Al-Intiṣāf min al-Kashshāf ("The Equitable Response to al-Kashshāf"), a theological and rhetorical refutation of al-Zamakhsharī's al-Kashshāf, praised by ʿIzz al-Dīn ibn ʿAbd al-Salām and Shams al-Dīn al-Khusrūshāhī. A gloss was later written on this work by al-Ghāmidī.
- Al-Muqtafā fī Āyāt al-Isrāʾ ("The Traced Path in the Verses of the Night Journey"), a detailed analysis of the Verse of al-Isrāʾ and related prophetic traditions, combining theology, tafsīr, and philosophical reasoning.
- Ikhtiṣār al-Tahdhīb ("Abridgment of the Refinement"), a concise summary of Tahdhīb al-Madārik, appreciated for its structured presentation of legal and biographical material.
- Al-Iqtifā ("The Emulative Companion"), a complementary and critical engagement with al-Shifāʾ by Qāḍī ʿIyāḍ
- Dīwān al-Khuṭab ("Collection of Sermons"), a collection of eloquent and stylistically rich Friday sermons, interspersed with poetry, showcasing his mastery in Arabic rhetoric and homiletics.
- Manāqib al-Shaykh Abī al-Qāsim al-Ghubārī ("The Virtues of Shaykh Abū al-Qāsim al-Ghubārī"), a biographical-hagiographical work detailing the life and merits of a spiritual figure from Alexandria.

== See also ==
- List of Ash'aris
