= 'Ala al-Din al-Baji =

13th-century Islamic Sunni Shafi'i legal theoretician and theologian

Alāʼal-Dīn al-Bājī علاء الدين الباجي
- Title: Alāʼal-Dīn

Personal life
- Born: 1234 Uncertain; possibly Badajoz
- Died: 1315 (aged 80–81) Cairo
- Era: Medieval era
- Region: Middle East
- Main interest(s): Islamic theology (kalam), Islamic jurisprudence, Principles of Islamic jurisprudence, Hadith
- Occupation: Jurist, Scholar, Islamic Theologian, Legal theoretician

Religious life
- Religion: Islam
- Denomination: Sunni
- Jurisprudence: Shafi'i
- Creed: Ash'ari

Muslim leader
- Influenced by: Al-Shafi'i Abu al-Hasan al-Ash'ari Izz al-Din ibn 'Abd al-Salam
- Influenced: Taqi al-Din al-Subki

ʿAlāʼal-Dīn Abū l-Ḥassan Alī ibn Muḥammad ibn ʿAbd al-Raḥman ibn al-Khaṭṭāb commonly known as Alāʼal-Dīn al-Bājī (Arabic: علاء الدين الباجي) was a Sunni Egyptian scholar of Moroccan origin. He was a prominent Shafi'i jurist and considered a leading legal theoretician and Ash'arite theologian of his day. He was known as a polemicist, skilled debater, meticulous, a verifier, scrutinizer, penetrating researcher, and one of the most prominent dialecticians of his day.

== Life ==
He was born in the year of 1234. He studied Shafi'i jurisprudence and its principles under Izz al-Din ibn 'Abd al-Salam in Damascus. He served as a Qadi in Al-Karak during the ruling era of Baybars. In Levant, he had very close friendship and firm companionship with al-Nawawi. Later, he moved to Cairo to work as a teacher, where he got involved in politics. His most popular student was Taqi al-Din al-Subki. His companions would assert that because al-Baji was a professional jurist, he would not issue a fatwa on a matter unless he had proof of it. They also asserted that he was pious and very strong in his faith. Ibn Daqiq al-'Id would greatly revere him by addressing everyone including the rulers as “O man”, except two people: Ala al-Din al-Baji whom he referred to as “O Imam”, and Ibn al-Rif'ah whom he referred to as “O jurist”. And al-Baji was the source of problems and debate sessions, and when Ibn Taymiyyah saw him, he frowned and did not say a word before him, so Imam 'Ala al-Din began to say: “Speak, let us investigate.” and Ibn Taymiyyah replied: “My likes shall not speak in your presence, my sole concern is to benefit from you.” Al-Baji was known as the sharpest Ash'ari thinker in his time. While he was based in Cairo and was the defender of the Sunni doctrine in Egypt. There was the renowned Safi al-Din al-Hindi, the defender of the same doctrine in Levant. After a long life of eighty-three years, al-Baji died in Cairo on the 6th of Dhul Qa'dah of the year 714 AH corresponding to February 1315 CE.

== Works ==
He has written a number of works on jurisprudence, principles, theology, and has one work on logic. However, they did not survive. His most well-known writings are "Kashf al-Haqa'iq" ("Disclosure of the truths"), which are based on Islamic law and "Mukhtasar Ulum al-Hadith" ("Abridgement of the sciences of Hadith"). The polemical commentary "Kitab fi Naqd al-Tawrat al-Yunaniyya" on the Torah is among his most fascinating works. It consists of texts from the five books analysed to highlight discrepancies and inconsistencies. Al-Baji also frequently presents Christian beliefs in the book and refutes them in order to invalidate them. His polemic book would be heavily referenced by later Muslims in their polemic debates with Christians and Jews.

== See also ==
- List of Ash'aris
- List of Muslim theologians

== Bibliography ==
- Mallet, Alexander; Thomas, David (3 August 2012). Christian-Muslim Relations. A Bibliographical History. (1200-1350). Vol. 4. Brill. pp. 67–68. ISBN 978-90-04-22855-9.
- al-Allam, Mustafa (2024). "Aladdin Al-Baji (d. 714 AH) - The efforts of Muslim scholars in responding to the People of the Book". islamanar.com (in Arabic). Archived from the original on 7 December 2024.
- ibn 'Abd al-Salam, Izz al-Din (1999). The Belief of the People of Truth. Translated by Gibril Fouad Haddad. As-Sunnah Foundation of America. p. 5. ISBN 9781930409026.
- Haddad, Gibril Fouad (2 May 2015). "Taj al-Din al-Subki (727 AH – 771 AH, 44 Years Old)". The Biographies of the Elite Lives of the Scholars, Imams & Hadith Masters. Zulfiqar Ayub. p. 271.
