= Al-Mundhiri =

13th-century Islamic scholar

Imam Al-Mundhirī
- المنذري
- Title: Shaykh al-Islām; Zakī al-Dīn; Al-Ḥāfiẓ

Personal life
- Born: 1185 Fustat
- Died: 1258 (aged 72–73) Cairo
- Era: Late Ayyubid and early Mamluk periods
- Region: Egypt
- Main interest(s): Hadith, Fiqh, History
- Notable work: At-Targhīb wa at-Tarhīb
- Occupation: Scholar, Muhaddith, Muslim Jurist, Historian

Religious life
- Religion: Islam
- Denomination: Sunni
- Jurisprudence: Shafi'i
- Creed: Ash'ari

Muslim leader
- Influenced by: Al-Shafi'i Abu Hasan al-Ash'ari Abu Tahir al-Silafi
- Influenced: Ibn Daqiq al-'Id Al-Dimyati Ibn al-Munayyir Shihab al-Din al-Qarafi Ibn Khallikan Ibn al-Dawadari

Abū Muḥammad ʿAbd al-ʿAẓīm ibn ʿAbd al-Qawī Zakī al-Dīn al-Mundhirī (Arabic: أبو محمد عبد العظيم بن عبد القوي زكي الدين المنذري), commonly known as Al-Mundhirī (Arabic: المنذري; 656–581 AH/ 1185–1258 CE) was a Sunni Egyptian scholar of Syrian origin. He was an influential jurist, hadith specialist, historian, muhaqqiq (researcher), and well-versed in the Arabic language. He is regarded as the greatest hadith scholar of his time.

== Biography ==
Al-Mundhirī's family origin was from Levant (Shām) but he was born in Fustat, Egypt in the year of the 1st Sha'ban 581 corresponding to 28 October 1185. He was proficient in Islamic etiquette and law and had memorised the Qur'an. He started studying the sciences of hadith and excelled in it. He studied under a number of scholars including Umar bin Tabarzad, Ghiyáth al-Muqri’, Aba ‘Umar bin Qudámah, Muwaffaq ad-Din ibn Qudámah and Sitt al-Katbah bint 'АН bin as-Sarrah. His most important teacher was Ibn al-Mufaddhal, a major hadith scholar in his time. He stayed with him for a while and completed his education with him. After he completed his studies, he began travelling to peruse further knowledge and visited many cities such as Mecca, Medina, Damascus, Harran, Edessa, Alexandria and others, prior to beginning to teach in the Al-Zafiri Mosque in Cairo. After that, he served as Shafi'i professor of hadith sciences at Dar al-Hadith al-Kamiliyya mosque for about 20 years. He then focused on authoring and narrating ahadith. He died on the 4 Dhu 'l-Qa'da 656/3 November 1258.

== Students ==
Many scholars would study and narrate Hadith from him. Among his most famous students;

- Ibn Daqiq al-'Id
- Al-Dimyati
- Ibn al-Munayyir
- Shihab al-Din al-Qarafi
- Ibn Khallikan
- Ibn al-Dawadari
- Abu Ḥusayn al-Yunini
- Isma'il Ibn `Asakir

== From the Events of His Life ==
In Egypt, he used to issue Fatawa (religious verdicts). He then stopped passing such judgements. He refused to make a religious determination for a bizarre reason, which reveals to us his justice, the softness of his soul, and his ability to identify virtue in those who possess it. Taj al-Din al-Subki hinted at this and said: “I heard my father (Taqī al-Dīn al-Subkī) saying that al-Shaykh ʿIzz al-Dīn ibn ʿAbd al-Salām used to teach ḥadīth for a short period in Damascus. Then, when he entered Cairo, he gave up teaching and began attending the gathering of al-Shaykh Zakī al-Dīn al-Mundhirī. He would sit in al-Mundhirī's lessons and listen to him among the general attendees, and he would not teach anything. Al-Shaykh Zakī al-Dīn al-Mundhirī also gave up issuing legal verdicts during this time. He said: ‘Wherever al-Shaykh ʿIzz al-Dīn enters (i.e., a town, city or region), then the people there have no need of me!’”

== Reception ==
ʿIzz al-Dīn ibn ʿAbd al-Salām said: “He was without equal in his knowledge of the sciences of ḥadīth in all their various branches. He was deeply knowledgeable regarding the authentic and weak reports, their hidden defects, and their chains of transmission. He was thoroughly grounded in the legal rulings derived from them, their meanings, their problematic aspects, and obscure expressions. He was precise in understanding rare expressions, grammar, and variant wordings. He excelled in the knowledge of narrators, their criticism and accreditation (al-jarḥ wa al-taʿdīl), their dates of birth and death, and their biographies. He was an imām, a firm authority (ḥujjah), trustworthy, pious, scrupulous in speech, and meticulous in what he narrated.”

Al-Dhahabi said: “There was no one in his time who had memorized more (Ahadith) than him.”

== Works ==
1. At-Targhīb wa at-Tarhīb ("The Encouragements and Warnings")
2. Mukhtaṣar Ṣaḥīḥ Muslim ("Abridgement of Ṣaḥīḥ Muslim")
3. Mukhtaṣar Sunan Abī Dāwūd ("Abridgement of Sunan Abī Dāwūd")
4. Sharḥ al-Tanbīh ("Commentary on al-Tanbīh")
5. Arbaʿūna Ḥadīthan fī Faḍl Iṣṭināʿ al-Maʿrūf ("Forty Ḥadīths on the Virtue of Doing Good Deeds")
6. Al-Aʿlām bi-Akhbār Shaykh al-Bukhārī Muḥammad ibn Sālim ("The Account of the Scholar of Bukhārā, Muḥammad ibn Sālim")
7. Muʿjam al-Shuyūkh ("Dictionary of the Shaykhs [Teachers]")
8. ʿAmal al-Yawm wa al-Laylah ("The Daily and Nightly Devotions")

== See also ==
- List of Ash'aris
