= List of Ash'aris =

One of three School of thought in Sunni Islam

Ash'aris are those who adhere to Imam Abu al-Hasan al-Ash'ari in his school of theology. Ashʿarism or Ashʿarī theology (/æʃəˈriː/; Arabic: الأشعرية: al-ʾAshʿarīyah) is one of the main Sunnī schools of Islamic theology, founded by the Arab Muslim scholar, Shāfiʿī jurist, and scholastic theologian Abū al-Ḥasan al-Ashʿarī in the 9th–10th century. It established an orthodox guideline based on scriptural authority, rationality.

Al-Ashʿarī established a middle way between the doctrines of the Atharī and Muʿtazila schools of Islamic theology, based both on reliance on the sacred scriptures of Islam and theological rationalism concerning the agency and attributes of God. Ashʿarism eventually became the predominant school of theological thought within Sunnī Islam, and is regarded as the single most important school of Islamic theology in the history of Islam.

Two popular sources for Asharism creeds are Maqalat al-Islamiyyin and Ibana'an Usul al-Diyana. Asharism adheres to Theological voluntarism (Divine command theory), thus right and wrong can not be determined intuitively or naturally, since they are not objective realities, but God commands – as revealed in the Quran and the ḥadīth — what is right and wrong. Good is what God commands and is by definition just; evil is what God forbids and is likewise unjust.

== Malikis ==
- Ibn Abi Zayd al-Qayrawani (d. 386 AH)
- Al-Baqillani (d. 403 AH)
- Qadi Abd al-Wahhab (d. 422 AH)
- Abu Imran al-Fasi (d. 430 AH)
- Abu Dharr al-Harawi (d. 434 AH)
- Ibn Battal (d. 449 AH)
- Ibn Sidah (d. 458 AH)
- Abu al-Walid al-Baji (d. 474 AH)
- Abu Bakr al-Turtushi (d. 520 AH)
- Al-Maziri (d. 536 AH)
- Ibn Barrajan (d. 536 AH)
- Ibn 'Atiyya (d. 541 AH)
- Abu Bakr ibn al-Arabi (d. 543 AH)
- Al-Qadi 'Ayyad (d. 544 AH)
- Al-Suhayli (d. 581 AH)
- Ibn al-Qattan (d. 628 AH)
- Al-Qurtubi (d. 671 AH)
- Ibn Malik (d. 672 AH)
- Ibn al-Munayyir (d. 683 AH)
- Shihab al-Din al-Qarafi (d. 684 AH)
- Ibn 'Ata' Allah al-Iskandari (d. 709 AH)
- Ibn Manzur (d. 711-12 AH)
- Ibn Adjurrum (d. 723 AH)
- Ibn al-Hajj al-'Abdari (d. 737 AH)
- Ibn Juzayy (d. 741 AH)
- Khalil ibn Ishaq al-Jundi (d. 776 AH)
- Abu Ishaq al-Shatibi (d. 790 AH)
- Ibn 'Arafa (d. 803 AH)
- Ibn Khaldun (d. 808 AH)
- Taqi al-Din al-Fasi (d. 832 AH)
- Abd al-Rahman al-Tha'alibi (d. 876 AH)
- Muhammad ibn Yusuf al-Sanusi (d. 895 AH)
- Ahmad Zarruq (d. 899 AH)
- Al-Maghili (d. 909 AH)
- Ahmad al-Wansharisi (d. 914 AH)
- Al-Akhdari (d. 953 AH)
- Al-Hattab (d. 954 AH)
- Ahmad Baba al-Timbukti (d. 1036 AH)
- Al-Maqqari al-Tilimsani (d. 1041 AH)
- Ibrahim al-Laqani (d. 1041 AH)
- Muhammad Mayyara (d. 1072 AH)
- Ibn 'Ashir (d. 1090 AH)
- Al-Hasan al-Yusi (d. 1102 AH)
- Muhammad al-Zurqani (d. 1122 AH)
- Usman dan Fodio (d. 1167 AH)
- Ahmad al-Dardir (d. 1201 AH)
- Ahmad ibn 'Ajiba (d. 1224 AH)
- Ahmad al-Tijani (d. 1230 AH)
- Muhammad Arafa al-Desouki (d. 1230 AH)
- Muhammad al-'Arabi al-Darqawi (d. 1239 AH)
- Muhammad ibn 'Ali al-Sanusi (d. 1276 AH)
- Muhammad 'Ilish (d. 1299 AH)
- Ahmad al-Ghumari (d. 1380 AH)
- Muhammad al-'Arabi al-Tabbani (d. 1390 AH)
- Ibrahim Niass (d. 1390 AH)
- Ibn Ashur (d. 1393 AH)
- Abdel-Halim Mahmoud (d. 1397 AH)
- 'Abdullah al-Ghumari (d. 1413 AH)
- Muhammad Metwalli al-Sha'rawi (d. 1419 AH)
- Muhammad 'Alawi al-Maliki (d. 1425 AH)
- Ahmad al-Tayyeb
- Ahmad Karima
- Hamza Yusuf
- Muhammad al-Yaqoubi
- Ahmed Saad Al-Azhari

== Shafi'is ==
- Ibn Hibban (d. 354 AH)
- Ibn Khafif (d. 371 AH)
- Al-Daraqutni (d. 385 AH)
- Al-Khattabi (d. 388 AH)
- Al-Halimi (d. 403 AH)
- Al-Hakim al-Nishapuri (d. 405 AH)
- Ibn Furak (d. 406 AH)
- Al-Sulami (d. 414 AH)
- Abu Ishaq al-Isfarayini (d. 418 AH)
- Al-Tha'labi (d. 427 AH)
- Abu Mansur al-Baghdadi (d.429 AH)
- Abu Nu'aym al-Isfahani (d.430 AH)
- Abu Muhammad al-Juwayni (d. 438 AH)
- Abu Uthman al-Sabuni (d. 449 AH)
- Abu al-Tayyib al-Tabari (d. 450 AH)
- Al-Mawardi (d. 450 AH)
- Al-Bayhaqi (d. 458 AH)
- Al-Khatib al-Baghdadi (d. 463 AH)
- Al-Qushayri (d. 465 AH)
- Al-Wahidi (d. 468 AH)
- Abd al-Qahir al-Jurjani (d. 471 AH)
- Abu Ishaq al-Shirazi (d. 476 AH)
- Al-Juwayni (d. 478 AH)
- Al-Raghib al-Isfahani (d. 502 AH)
- Al-Kiya al-Harrasi (d. 504 AH)
- Al-Ghazali (d. 505 AH)
- Abu al-Qasim al-Ansari (d. 512 AH)
- Al-Baghawi (d.516 AH)
- Al-Shahrastani (d. 548 AH)
- Diya' al-Din al-Makki (d. 550 AH)
- Ibn al-Sam'ani (d. 562 AH)
- Ibn 'Asakir (d. 571 AH)
- Abu Tahir al-Silafi (d. 576 AH)
- Ahmad al-Rifa'i (d. 578 AH)
- Majd ad-Dīn Ibn Athir (d. 606 AH)
- Fakhr al-Din al-Razi (d. 606 AH)
- Abu al-Qasim al-Rafi'i (d. 623 AH)
- Sayf al-Din al-Amidi (d. 630 AH)
- Ibn al-Athir (d. 630 AH)
- Ibn al-Dubaythi (d. 637 AH)
- Ibn al-Salah (d. 643 AH)
- Ibn al-Najjar (d. 643 AH)
- Muhammad ibn Ali Ba 'Alawi (d. 653 AH)
- Al-Mundhiri (d. 656 AH)
- Izz al-Din ibn 'Abd al-Salam (d. 660 AH)
- Athir al-Din al-Abhari (d. 663 AH)
- Sa'eed ibn Isa al-Amoudi (d. 671 AH)
- Najm al-Din al-Qazwini al-Katibi (d. 675 AH)
- Al-Nawawi (d. 676 AH)
- Ibn Khallikan (d. 681 AH)
- Siraj al-Din Urmavi (d. 682 AH)
- Al-Baydawi (d. 685 AH)
- Ibn Daqiq al-'Id (d. 702 AH)
- Al-Dimyati (d. 705 AH)
- Ibn al-Rif'ah (d. 710 AH)
- 'Ala al-Din al-Baji (d. 714 AH)
- Safi al-Din al-Hindi (d. 715 AH)
- Nizam al-Din al-Nisapuri (d. 728 AH)
- Jalal al-Din al-Qazwini (d. 739 AH)
- 'Ala al-Din al-Khazin (d. 741 AH)
- Adud al-Din al-Iji (d. 756 AH)
- Taqi al-Din al-Subki (d. 756 AH)
- Salah al-Din al-Ala'i (d. 761 AH)
- Al-Safadi (d. 764 AH)
- Taj al-Din al-Subki (d. 771 AH)
- Jamal al-Din al-Isnawi (d. 772 AH)
- Shams al-Din al-Kirmani (d. 786 AH)
- Al-Zarkashi (d. 794 AH)
- Ibn al-Mulaqqin (d. 804 AH)
- Siraj al-Din al-Bulqini (d. 805 AH)
- Zain al-Din al-'Iraqi (d. 806 AH)
- Nur al-Din al-Haythami (d. 807 AH)
- Al-Damiri (d. 808 AH)
- Firuzabadi (d. 817 AH)
- Wali al-Din al-'Iraqi (d. 826 AH)
- Ibn al-Jazari (d. 833 AH)
- Ibn Raslan (d. 844 AH)
- Ibn Hajar al-Asqalani (d. 852 AH)
- Al-Mahalli (d. 864 AH)
- Siraj al-Din al-Makhzumi (d. 885 AH)
- Al-Sakhawi (d. 902 AH)
- Al-Suyuti (d. 911 AH)
- Nur al-Din al-Samhudi (d. 911 AH)
- Jalal al-Din al-Dawani (d. 918 AH)
- Al-Qastallani (d. 923 AH)
- Zakariyya al-Ansari (d. 926 AH)
- Ibn al-Dayba' (d. 944 AH)
- Shihab al-Din al-Ramli (d. 957 AH)
- Al-Sha'rani (d. 973 AH)
- Ibn Hajar al-Haytami (d. 974 AH)
- Al-Khatib al-Shirbini (d. 977 AH)
- Shams al-Din al-Ramli (d. 1004 AH)
- Al-Munawi (d. 1031 AH)
- 'Abdallah ibn 'Alawi al-Haddad (d. 1132 AH)
- Hasan al-Attar (d. 1230 AH)
- Ibrahim al-Bajuri (d. 1276 AH)
- Ahmad Zayni Dahlan (d. 1304 AH)
- Yusuf al-Nabhani (d. 1350 AH)
- Bediuzzaman Said Nursi (d. 1379 AH)
- Ahmad Kaftaru (d. 1425 AH)
- Noah al-Qudah (d. 1432 AH)
- 'Abdallah al-Harari (d. 1432 AH)
- Muhammad Said Ramadan al-Bouti (d. 1434 AH)
- Wahbah al-Zuhayli (d. 1436 AH)
- Ahmad Badreddin Hassoun
- Ali Gomaa
- Ali al-Jifri
- Umar bin Hafiz
- Gibril Fouad Haddad
- Nuh Ha Mim Keller
- Sa'id Foudah

== Hanbalis ==
- Ibn 'Aqil (d. 508 AH)
- Ibn al-Jawzi (d. 534 AH)

== Zahiris ==
- Ibn Tumart (d. 524 AH)
- Ibn Mada' (d. 592 AH)
- Abu Hayyan al-Andalusi (d. 745 AH)

== Hanafi ==
- Al-Taftazani (d. 792 AH)
- Al-Sharif al-Jurjani (d. 816 AH)
- Ali Qushji (d. 879 AH)
- Molla Hüsrev (d. 888 AH)
- Taşköprüzade (d. 968 AH)
- Mosleh al-Din Lari (d. 980 AH)
- Shah Waliullah Dehlawi (d. 1176 AH)
- Giritli Sırrı Pasha (d. 1313 AH)
- Mustafa Sabri (d. 1373 AH)
- Mohammed al-Ghazali (d. 1416 AH)

== Ash'ari leaders ==
- Mahmud of Ghazni (d. 421 AH)
- Nizam al-Mulk (d. 485 AH)
- 'Abd al-Mu'min ibn 'Ali (d. 558 AH)
- Saladin (d. 589 AH)
- Abu Bakr ibn Ayyub (d. 615 AH)
- Al-Kamil (d. 635 AH)
- Al-Ashraf Musa (d. 635 AH)
- Qutuz (d. 658 AH)
- Al-Nasir ibn Qalawun (d. 741 AH)
- Emir Abdelkader al-Jazairi (d. 1300 AH)
- Omar al-Mukhtar (d. 1350 AH)
- Abd el-Krim al-Khattabi (d. 1382 AH)
- Al-Muwahhidun
- Ayyubid dynasty
- Wali Sanga
- Lumpang Basih or Seven Ba 'Alawi sada that brought Islam to the Philippines
- Sharif ul-Hāshim of Sulu
- Sultanate of Sulu
- Sultanate of Maguindanao
