= Al-Hattab =

16th-century Tripolitanian Muslim jurist

Muhammad ibn Muhammad at-Tarabulsi al-Hattab al-Ru'yani
- Title: Al-Hattab

Personal life
- Born: 1497 CE (902 AH); Mecca, Mamluk Sultanate
- Died: 1547 CE (954 AH); Tajura, Tripoli, Ottoman Empire
- Era: (Beginning of Ottoman Caliphate era)
- Region: Mecca and Tripoli (modern day Libya)
- Main interest: Fiqh
- Notable work: Mawahib al-Jalil

Religious life
- Religion: Islam
- Jurisprudence: Maliki

Muhammad Abu 'Abd Allah ibn Muhammad at-Tarabulsi al-Hattab al-Ru'yani (May 21, 1497 – 1547 CE) (902 AH – 954 AH) (Arabic: محمد أبو عبدالله بن محمد الحطاب الرعيني), more commonly referred to in Islamic scholarship as al-Hattab or Imam al-Hattab, was a 16th-century CE Muslim jurist from Tripoli, the capital of modern-day Libya. Al-Hattab was a scholar of the Maliki school of Islamic jurisprudence (fiqh). His book Mawahib al-Jalil, which was one of the first major commentaries on Khalil's Mukhtassar (Concise Text), is considered one of the best and most thorough commentaries in the Maliki school of law.

== Life ==
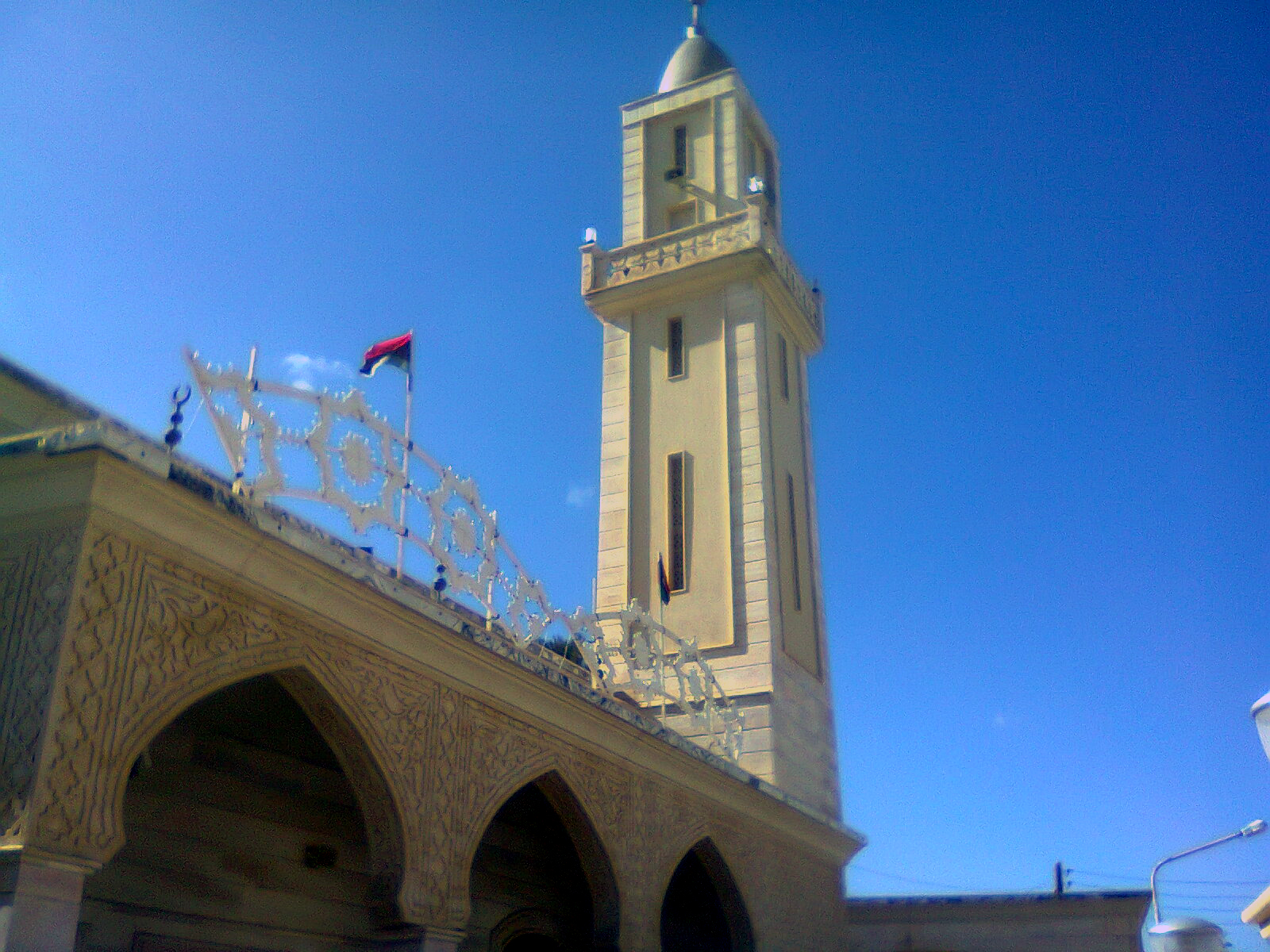
The Hattab Zawiya and Mosque in Tajura, Libya, where al-Hattab's father Muhammad ibn Abdur-Rahman is buried. The two are often mistaken in books of Islamic law as both have the same first and last name and both were accomplished jurists. The actual burial place of al-Hattab is unknown.

Al-Hattab was born in Mecca on the 18th of Ramadan (the Muslim holy month of fasting) in 902 AH (May 21, 1497 CE). His lineage was from the Andalusian Ru'yani family, which immigrated from Andalusia to Tripolitania and was known for its scholars. His father of the same name Muhammad al-Hattab emigrated to Mecca with his entire family during the weakening of the Hafsid dynasty's rule in Tripoli before the conquest of North Africa by Habsburg Spain. Al-Hattab is sometimes referred to as al-Hattab al-Saghir (Al-Hattab the Younger) to differentiate him from his father, and was the oldest of his three children. He is also sometimes known as Hattab al-Abb (Hattab the Father), whilst his father is Hattab al-Jadd (Hattab the Grandfather), and his most famous son Yahya who was also a scholar is known as Hattab al-Ibn (Hattab the Son).

Al-Hattab initially studied under his father, who held a religious title in Mecca. He learned the Quran from a young age. He also studied hadith under the direct students of some of the most important scholars in Islamic history such as al-Suyuti, Ibn Hajar al-Asqalani and al-Sakhawi. Muhammad studied most of the other Islamic sciences from his father however, who was himself a respected scholar in his own right and a student of Al-Sakhawi. Al-Hattab took his fiqh (jurisprudence) in particular from his father, a field in which he was to later excel and become famous. He studied many texts under his tutelage including the Muwatta of Imam Malik, the Mudawwana of Sahnun, the Risala of Ibn Abi Zayd, the Tamhid of Ibn 'Abd al-Barr, the Muqaddimaat of Averroes, the Dhakira of al-Qarafi, the Sharh al-'Umda of al-Fakihani, the Mukhtassar of Khalil as well as many other primary texts of the Maliki school.

Al-Hattab later began a period of travel through the Islamic world both East and West. He spent a period of time studying in Egypt in particular but later moved back to Tripoli with his father. When he returned to Tripoli, his study circles became so popular that many Sufis in the city preferred to attend his lessons over their sessions of remembrance (dhikr). He spent much of his time taking care of his father during this period of his life. Al-Hattab died at a relatively young age, and there are different accounts as to where he actually died, whether in Mecca or in Tripoli.

His intellectual legacy is best embodied in his works of Islamic Jurisprudence (fiqh). His Mawahib al-Jalil in particular is one of the important texts in Maliki fiqh and is widely regarded as the best commentary on the Concise Text of Khalil. Another of his famous works is Qurrat al-'Ayn, which is a short text that expounds on the Waraqat of Imam al-Juwayni, a key text in Usul (Islamic Legal Methodology).

== See also ==
- List of Ash'aris and Maturidis
