= Ibn 'Arafa =

Ifriqiyan imam in the Hafsid period (1316–1401)

Personal life
- Born: 716 AH
- Died: 803 AH

Religious life
- Religion: Islam
- Denomination: Sunni
- Jurisprudence: Maliki
- Creed: Ashari

Muslim leader
- Influenced by: Ibn 'Abd al-Salam

Ibn 'Arafa (Arabic: ابن عرفة), born Mohammed ibn Mohammed ibn Arafa al-Warghammi, in 1316 in Tunis and died in 1401 in the same city, was a Tunisian Imam, the most illustrious representative of Maliki Islam to the Hafsid period.

Of Berber origin from south-eastern Tunisia, he had knowledge of law, of grammar, of rhetoric, of mathematics, and of medicine that enabled him to lead the prestigious Al-Zaytuna Mosque and the University of Ez-Zitouna for several years.

Staunch defender of Maliki Islam, he did not hesitate to come into direct conflict with several Sufi of his time as the esoteric and religious practices he witnessed were beyond the precepts of Islam and the understanding of the faithful. He also had conflicts with Ibn Khaldun who he suspected had non-religious motives. Khaldun, in turn, accused Ibn Arafa of being jealous of his popularity.

As a theologian, Ibn Arafa was a strict and pure Maliki, and a powerful figure especially in Tunisia. He was also the author of numerous books on law, theology, and logic. Such books are stored at Zaytuna, in Tunisia.

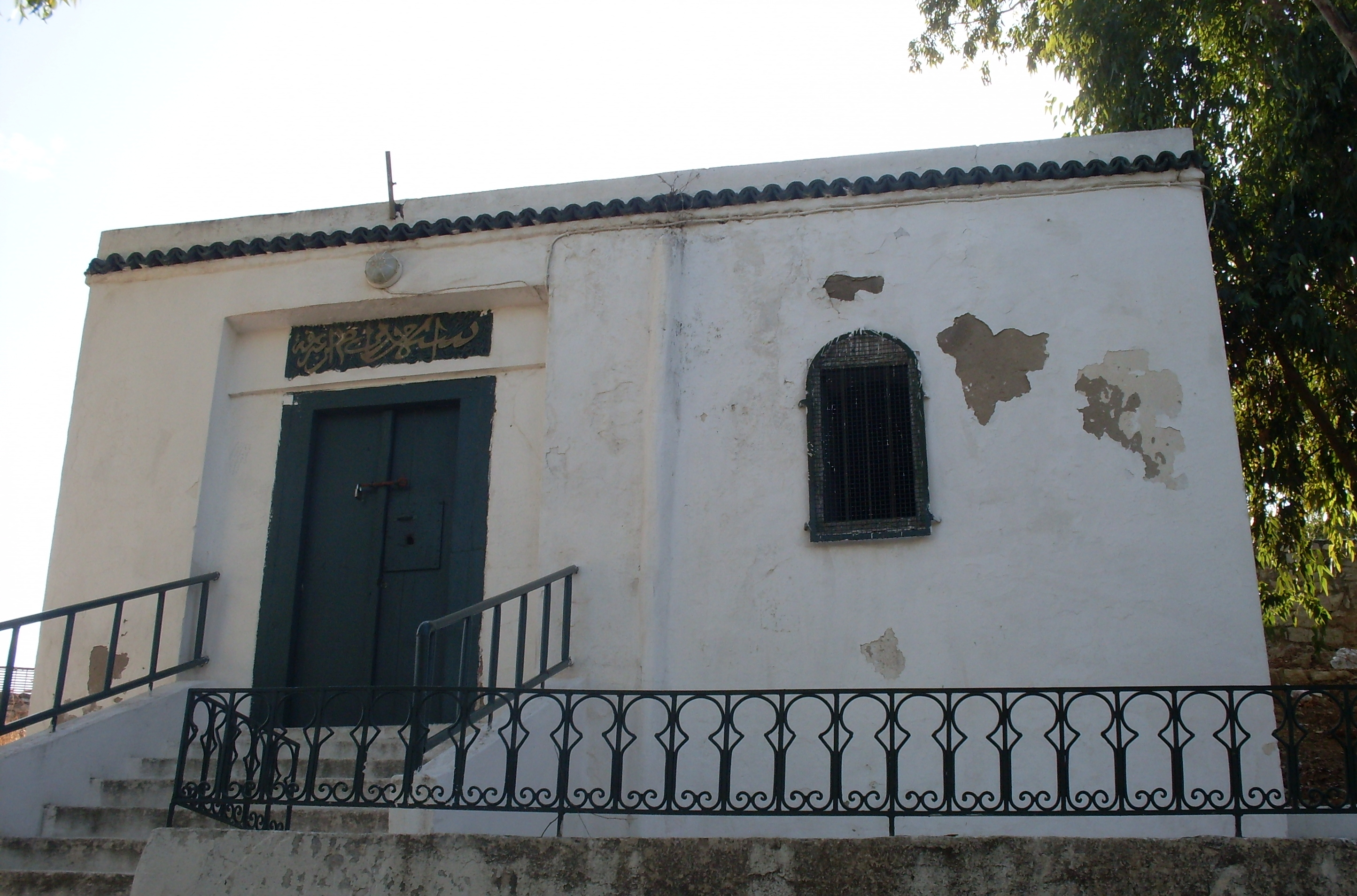
Mausoleum of Ibn Arafa in Djellaz

At his death in 1401, he was buried in Djellaz Cemetery located in the old medina of Tunis, which has been preserved as the oldest historical monument of the state.

== See also ==
- List of Ash'aris and Maturidis
