= Siraj al-Din Urmavi =

Sirāj al-Dīn Mahmūd ibn Abī Bakr Urmavī

Personal life
- Born: 1198 C.E (594 AH) Urmia, West Azerbaijan, Iran
- Died: 1283 C.E (682 AH) Konya, Anatolia (modern-day Turkey)
- Main interest: Ilm ar-Rijal

Religious life
- Religion: Islam
- Denomination: Sunni
- Jurisprudence: Shafi'i
- Creed: Ash'ari

Muslim leader
- Influenced: Fakhr al-Din al-Razi

Sirāj al-Dīn Mahmūd ibn Abī Bakr Urmavī (also spelled Urmawī; 1198–1283) was a Shafiʽi jurist, logician and philosopher from Urmia in Azerbaijan, a region in north-western Iran. He spent most of his scholarly life in Ayyubid-ruled Cairo, and from 1257 in Seljuk-ruled Konya. The Iranian diaspora he was part of, proficient in Persian and Arabic, contributed majorly to the Islamization and Persianization of Anatolia. Most of his extant works were written in Arabic but there is also one known work in Persian. He was an acquaintance of Rumi.

== Career ==
A Persian-speaking Iranian, Urmavi went to Mosul to study religion and mental science. He became a well-known scholar, not only in religion and mental studies but also in philosophy, logic, medicine, mathematics and astronomy and received praise from his professors. He was a student of Kamal al-Din ibn Yunus and found interest in his work on Fakhr al-Din al-Razi. Urmavi later travelled to Malatya to meet Awhad al-Din Kermani and was welcomed by Kayqubad I. Afterwards, he left for Damascus and Cairo. The Ayyubid Sultan As-Salih Ayyub made Urmavi an ambassador in the 1240s. In circa 1257, Urmavi moved to Konya in the Sultanate of Rum, where he wrote many works including the most famous work of his Latā'if al-ḥikma which he handed over to Kaykaus I. The reason behind his move to Konya is uncertain, but it could have been due to the Mongol invasion. In Konya, Urmavi became a qadi (religious judge) by 1266 and issued a fatwa to defend the city when the Mongols approached the city. This was welcomed by Kaykaus I who conveyed his appreciation in a letter to Urmavi and made him an elder of Anatolia. Urmavi was praised by Ahmad Aflaki who also mentioned that he was an acquaintance of Rumi and gave an anecdote on their relationship. Urmavi was moreover present at the funeral of Rumi.

Urmavi died in 1283 in Konya. Safi al-Din al-Hindi was a student of Urmavi.

== Latā'if al-ḥikma ==
The work Latā'if al-ḥikma was written in Persian in 1257 and about the fundamental problems in philosophy. It was dedicated to the ruler of Konya Kayqubad I and written to complement the incomplete work al-Latâif al-ghiyâthiyya of al-Razi. The first two parts of the book were titled "Hikmet-i İlmî" and "Hikmet-i Amelî" and focused on nature, the value of knowledge, the various types of knowledge, the usud ad-din and the cosmology of Ithbât al-wâjib among many other subjects. The last part of the book titled Siyâset-i Bedenî was about morality including the subjects of virtue, habits and whether habits can change through education. It also touched the subjects of home management and country administration.

== Other works ==
All other extant works of Urmavi were written in Arabic and include:

- Kitāb al-Tahsīl
- Kitāb al-Lubāb
- Bayān al-Haqq
- Kitāb Maṭāli' al-anwār
- A commentary on the Wajīz of al-Ghazali (died 1111)
- A continuation of the Nihāya fī gharīb al-hadīth of Majd al-Din ibn al-Athir (died 1210)
- A commentary on the Ishārāt of Ibn Sina (died 1037)
- Works on philology and disputation ('ilm al-jadal)

== See also ==
- Fakhr al-Din al-Razi
- Shihab al-Din al-Qarafi
- Al-Baydawi
- Al-Sharif al-Jurjani
- List of Ash'aris and Maturidis

== Sources ==
- Darling, Linda T. (2013). A History of Social Justice and Political Power in the Middle East: The Circle of Justice From Mesopotamia to Globalization. Routledge.
- Marlow, Louise (2010). "A Thirteenth-Century Scholar in the Eastern Mediterranean: Sirāj al-Dīn Urmavī, Jurist, Logician, Diplomat". Al-Masāq: Journal of the Medieval Mediterranean. 22 (3): 279–313. doi:10.1080/09503110.2010.522386.
