= Jamal al-Din al-Isnawi =

14th-century Islamic scholar

Imam Jamal al-Din al-Isnawi
- جمال الدين الإسنوي
- Title: Shaykh ash-Shafi'iyyah; Jamāl al-Dīn

Personal life
- Born: 1304 Esna
- Died: 1370 (aged 65–66) Cairo
- Era: Mamluk Sultanate
- Region: Egypt
- Main interest(s): Fiqh, Usul al-Fiqh, Tafsir, Arabic grammar
- Notable work(s): Kāfī al-Muḥtāj ilā Sharḥ al-Minhāj; Nihāyat al-Sūl fī Sharḥ Minhāj al-Uṣūl
- Occupation: Scholar, Jurist, legal theoretician, Quranic exegete, Grammarian

Religious life
- Religion: Islam
- Denomination: Sunni
- Jurisprudence: Shafi'i
- Creed: Ash'ari

Muslim leader
- Influenced by: Al-Shafi'i Abu Hasan al-Ash'ari Abu Hayyan al-Gharnati Taqi al-Din al-Subki Jalal al-Din al-Qazwini
- Influenced: Zain al-Din al-'Iraqi Ibn al-Mulaqqin Al-Zarkashi Al-Damiri

Jamāl al-Dīn Abū Muḥammad ʿAbd al-Raḥīm ibn al-Ḥasan al-Umawī al-Qurashī al-Isnawī al-Shāfiʿī al-Miṣrī (Arabic: جمال الدين أبو محمد عبد الرحيم الحسن الأموي القرشي الإسنوي الشافعي), commonly known as Jamal al-Din al-Isnawi (Arabic: جمال الدين الإسنوي), was a Sunni Egyptian scholar who specialized in the Shafi'i school of jurisprudence, legal theory, Qu'ran exegesis, and Arabic grammar. He was a well-known, prolific writer who authored beneficial books.

== Life ==
He was born in 704 AH (1305 CE) in the city of Isnā in southern Egypt. From his father, he studied jurisprudence (fiqh), inheritance law (farāʾiḍ), and Arabic. During this time, he also memorized the Qur'an. In 721 AH (1321 CE), he went to Cairo and studied under prominent scholars. Al-Isnawi studied hadith and engaged in various sciences. He took jurisprudence from Taqi al-Din al-Subki, Jalal al-Din al-Qazwini, Qutb al-Din al-Sunbātī, al-Wajizi, and others. He studied grammar under Abu Hayyan al-Gharnati and read with him (al-Tashil), and he mastered the rational sciences from Alāʾ al-Dīn al-Qunawī and al-Tustari and others. He devoted himself to reading and benefiting others, and he engaged in writing and compiling works. He became one of the well-known scholars of his time in the fields of Arabic language and literature, jurisprudence, and its principles (uṣūl).

He had deep familiarity with the earliest sources of the Shāfiʿī school as well as later foundational texts and commentaries, particularly al-Rāfi'ī's al-Sharḥ al-Kabīr and al-Nawawī's Rawdat al-Talibin. Despite the fame of al-Nawawī and al-Rāfiʿī within the school, he criticized them and accused them of ignorance regarding Shāfiʿī opinions. For this purpose, he composed his work al-Muhimmāt. Some Shāfi'ī jurists also wrote refutations of Isnāwī, claiming that he did not properly understand al-Nawawī.

Although Isnāwī was appointed muḥtasib (market inspector) during the reign of the Mamlūk Sultan Nāṣir, he resigned in 762 AH (1361 CE) due to a dispute with the vizier Ibn Kuzaynah. Later, he was appointed to the treasury (bayt al-māl), but in 766 AH (1365 CE) he left that position as well to devote himself to scholarship. He taught hadith, jurisprudence, and Arabic literature to prominent figures such as Jamāl al-Dīn Ibn Zahīrah, Zayn al-Dīn al-ʿIrāqī, Ibn al-Mulaqqin, al-Zarkashi, and Kamāl al-Dīn al-Damīrī. He passed away on 18 Jumādā al-Awwal 772 AH (8 December 1370 CE).

== Reception ==
Al-Suyuti said:

“He advanced in jurisprudence and became the Imam of his time, and the leadership of the Shafi'i school ended with him.“

Zain al-Din al-'Iraqi said about him:

“He devoted himself to the sciences until he became the unrivaled scholar of his age and the leading Shafi‘i authority of his time. He authored beneficial and widely-circulated works, and the students of the Egyptian lands graduated under him. He was handsome in appearance and composition, gentle in manner, and abundant in good deeds.”

== Works ==
Jamal al-Din al-Isnawi was a prolific writer who authored books on various subjects such as jurisprudence, principles of jurisprudence, sciences of the Qu'ran and Arabic language:

1. Kāfī al-Muḥtāj ilā Sharḥ al-Minhāj - One of the most significant commentaries on al-Nawawi's Shafi‘i jurisprudence work, Minhaj al-Talibin.
2. Nihāyat al-Sūl fī Sharḥ Minhāj al-Uṣūl – One of the most important commentaries written on Qadi Baydawi's work on uṣūl al-fiqh entitled Minhaj al-Usul.
3. Zawāʾid al-Uṣūl ʿalā Minhāj al-Wuṣūl – Written to explain issues not covered in al-Baydawi's Minhaj al-Usul, drawing also on Fakhr al-Din al-Razi's al-Maḥṣūl, Sayf al-Din al-Amidi Al-Iḥkām fī Uṣūl al-Aḥkām and Ibn al-Hajib's al-Mukhtaṣar. His student Ibrāhīm b. Mūsā al-Anbāsī wrote a commentary titled al-Fawāʾid fī Sharḥ al-Zawā'id.
4. Al-Tamhīd fī Taḥrīj (Istikhrāj) al-Furūʿ ʿalā al-Uṣūl – An important example of works showing how to derive rulings from uṣūl principles. Unlike contemporaries such as Shahāb al-Dīn al-Zanjānī and Muḥammad b. Aḥmad al-Tilimsānī, the author focused mainly on his own school’s rules and opinions.
5. Ṭabaqāt al-Shāfiʿiyya – Contains biographies of 1,289 Shāfiʿī scholars up to his time, arranged alphabetically by famous name, kunya, laqab, and nisba.
6. Al-Kalimāt al-Muhimma fī Mubāsharati Ahl al-Ẓimma – A treatise opposing the employment of non-Muslim subjects in positions of fiscal and administrative influence.
7. Nihāyat al-Rāghib fī Sharḥ ʿArūḍ Ibn al-Ḥājib
8. Al-Kawkab al-Durrī fīmā Yataḥarraj ʿalā al-Uṣūl al-Naḥwiyya min al-Furūʿ al-Fiqhiyya
9. Al-Muhimmāt fī Sharḥ al-Rāfiʿī wa al-Rawḍa – Written to critique al-Rāfiʿī and al-Nawawī. Commentators such as Aḥmad b. ʿImād al-Akfehsī and ʿUmar b. Ruslān al-Bulqīnī wrote refutations of Isnāwī’s views. Manuscripts exist in multiple libraries.
10. Maṭāliʿ al-Daqāʾiq fī Taḥrīr al-Jawāmiʿ wa al-Fawāriq – Also known in some sources as al-Lawāmiʿ wa al-Bawāriq fī al-Jawāmiʿ wa al-Fawāriq.
11. Al-Tanqīḥ (fīmā Yuridū) ʿalā al-Taṣḥīḥ – Written to evaluate Abu Ishaq al-Shirazi's al-Tanbīh and supplement al-Nawawī's Taṣḥīḥ al-Tanbīh.
12. Tadhkirat al-Nabīh fī Taṣḥīḥ al-Tanbīh – A second study on al-Nawawī’s work, published together with the previous book. A commentary was written on it by Yūnus b. ʿAbd al-Wahhāb b. Aḥmad al-Aysāwī.
13. Kāfī al-Muḥtāj – A commentary on al-Nawawī’s Minhāj al-Ṭālibīn up to Kitāb al-Musāqāt, completed by his student Badr al-Dīn al-Zarkashī as Takmīlat Sharḥ al-Minhāj.
14. Al-Hidāyah ilā Awḥām al-Kifāyah – Related to Ibn al-Rif'ah's commentary Kifāyat al-Nabīh.
15. Jawāhir al-Baḥrayn fī Tanāquḍ al-Ḥibrayn – On contradictions in the views of al-Rāfiʿī and al-Nawawī.
16. Ṭirāz al-Maḥāfil fī al-Ghāzī al-Masāʾil
17. Al-Jawāhir al-Muzīʾa fī Sharḥ al-Muqaddimah al-Raḥbiyya fī al-Farā'iḍ
18. Iḍāḥ al-Mushkil min Aḥkām al-Khunsāʾ al-Mushkil (Aḥkām al-Khunāsāʾ) – Prepared as a master’s thesis by Ibrāhīm b. ʿAbd al-ʿAzīz al-Gusn.
19. Al-Furūq wa Ḍawʾ al-Ziyādāt ʿalā Minhāj al-Ṭālibīn li al-Nawawī

== See also ==
- List of Ash'aris
