= Al-Subki =

Al-Subki is a surname. Notable people with the surname include:

- Taqi al-Din al-Subki (1284–1355), Egyptian scholar
- Taj al-Din al-Subki (1327–1370), Egyptian scholar, his son
