= Al-Yunini =

Syrian historian and religious scholar

Quṭb al-Dīn Abu ʾl-Fatḥ Mūsā ibn Muḥammad ibn Aḥmad ibn ʿAbd Allāh al-Yūnīnī (1242–1326) was a Syrian historian and religious scholar of the Ḥanbalī school of jurisprudence. He wrote the Dhayl Mirʾāt al-zamān, a continuation of the Mirʾāt al-zamān of Sibṭ ibn al-Jawzī.

== Life ==
Mūsā was born on 7 August 1242 in Damascus. His family claimed descent from Jaʿfar al-Ṣādiq and originally came from the village of Yūnīn, hence his nisba al-Yūnīnī. His father was Muḥammad Taqī al-Dīn Abū ʿAbd Allāh and his mother Zayn al-ʿArab bint Naṣr Allāh. His early studies took place in Baalbek and Damascus. In 1260, his father died and elder brother ʿAlī sent him to Egypt to continue his education. In 1275, he performed the Ḥajj to Mecca. He visited Egypt in 1276–1277.

In 1281, al-Yūnīnī and a fellow scholar enlisted in the war against the Mongol invasion of Syria. His friend died in the battle of Homs. Passing through Tripoli in March 1289, al-Yūnīnī witnessed the siege and fall of the city. Later that year, he visited Egypt a final time. In his trips to Egypt he learned ḥadīth and acquired the ijāza (teaching licence) from prominent Shāfiʿī and Mālikī scholars, including al-Dimyāṭī and ʿIzz al-Dīn al-Sulamī.

In 1302, his elder brother was assassinated in his own library and al-Yūnīnī succeeded him as the shaykh of the Ḥanbalīs of Baalbek. He continued the family tradition of great respect towards the Ṣūfīs. He rarely left Baalbek in his later years. He died there on 13 September 1326. He was not famous in his own lifetime, but he is mentioned in several biographical dictionaries. The most important of these is that of al-Dhahabī, who studied ḥadīth under him in Damascus and Baalbek.

Al-Yūnīnī had a son, Muḥammad, who also became a Ḥanbalī ḥadīth scholar, but not as prominent as his ancestors. He had a daughter who married a much older man, Aybak al-Iskandarī al-Ṣāliḥī, who was prominent in the Mamluks administration and died in 1276.

== Works ==
Al-Yūnīnī admired the Mirʾāt al-zamān of Sibṭ ibn al-Jawzī and created an abridgement in four volumes entitled Mukhtaṣar. Around 1281, he began work on a continuation designed to carry the history of Sibṭ ibn al-Jawzī from 1256 down to 1311. This became the Dhayl Mirʾāt al-zamān. It is an original and independent source for the history of Syria during this period, when the area was ruled by Ayyubids, Crusaders and Mamluks. Al-Yūnīnī relied heavily on his own testimony and also on official documents to which he had access because of his good relationship with the Mamluk rulers. Earlier historians he cites include Ibn Khallikān, Abū Shāma, Ibn Ḥammawayh, al-Juwaynī, Ibn Shaddād, Ibn ʿAbd al-Ẓāhir, Ibn Wāṣil, Ibn al-Mustawfī, Ibn al-Najjār and Ibn al-ʿAdīm.

The Dhayl survives in 23 known manuscripts but in two different redactions, a long version and a short. There is no single modern edition of the Dhayl. The years 1256–1288 are covered in four volumes edited by Fritz Krenkow and Muḥammad Munīr al-Shādhilī and published as Dhail Mir'ātu'z-zamān at Hyderabad in 1954, 1955, 1960 and 1961. The years 1288–1291 are covered in Antranig Melkonian's unpublished doctoral thesis, Die Jahre 1287–1291 in der Chronik al-Yūnīnīs, completed in 1975 at the University of Freiburg. Li Guo's edition in two volumes covers 1297–1301.

Al-Yūnīnī is the claimed author of a history of Baghdad, Taʾrīkh Baghdād, but this text is lost. He may also have contributed to a pair of "apologetic biographies" of his father's father-in-law, ʿAbd Allāh al-Yūnīnī, and a more distant relative, ʿAbd al-Qādir al-Jīlānī. Entitled Manāqib ʿAbd al-Qādir al-Jīlānī wa-ʿAbd Allāh ibn ʿUthmān al-Yūnīnī, this work is also attributed to al-Yūnīnī's brother. Both may have had a hand in composing it in response to Sibṭ ibn al-Jawzī's meagre notice on al-Jīlānī.

== Bibliography ==
- Guo, Li, ed. (1998). Early Mamluk Syrian Historiography: Al-Yūnīnī's Dhayl Mirʾāt al-zamān. Brill. 2 vols.
- Little, Donald Presgrave (1970). An Introduction to Mamluk Historiography: An Analysis of Arabic Annalistic and Biographical Sources for the Reign of al-Malik an-Nāṣir Muḥammad ibn Qalāʾūn. Franz Steiner.
- Mahomedy, Mahomed, ed. (2016). The Rewards for Good Deeds: Shaykh sharaf al-Dîn 'Abdul Mu'min ad-Dimyâtî rahimaẖullâh (d. 705 A.H.). Dar Al-Kotob Al-Ilmiyah. ISBN 9782745176554.
- Petry, Carl F. (2022). The Mamluk Sultanate: A History. Cambridge University Press.
- Sublet, Jacqueline (2002). "al-Yūnīnī". In Bearman, P. J.; Bianquis, Th.; Bosworth, C. E.; van Donzel, E. & Heinrichs, W. P. (eds.). The Encyclopaedia of Islam, Second Edition. Volume XI: W–Z. Leiden: E. J. Brill. pp. 345–346. ISBN 978-90-04-12756-2.
