= At-Targhib wat-Tarhib =

Hadith collection by Abdul Azeem Al Munzari

- Author: Hafiz Zaki al-Din al-Mundhiri
- Original title: الترغيب والترهيب
- Language: Arabic
- Genre: Hadith collection

At-Targhib wat-Tarhib (Arabic: الترغيب والترهيب) or Targhib wal Tarhib, (English: Reward and Punishment) is one of the Hadith book collections compiled and authored by Hafiz Zaki al-Din al-Mundhiri.

== Etymology ==
The term "targhib" means "encouragement", "motivation", "stimulation" or "inspiration", and the term "terhib" means "warning". Thus the Quranic concept of "Targhib wal Tarhib" means "reward and Punishment".

== Description ==
An collection of Hadith from the Classical Period that describes the benefits of different good deeds and cautions against certain bad deeds. Anyone engaged in the work of encouraging good and forbidding evil (Da'wah) will find this book to be of great assistance. The book contains nearly 1,000 hadiths according to Maktaba Shamila.

== Contents ==
The book is divided into 14 chapters:

1. The Book of the Sunnah
2. The Book of Knowledge
3. The Book of Ritual Purification
4. The Book of Book of Prayer
5. The Book of Charity
6. The Book of Fasting
7. The Book of Hajj Pilgrimage
8. The Book of the Recitation of Quran
9. The Book of Remembrance and Supplication
10. The Book of Judges
11. The Book of Legal Punishments
12. The Book of Righteousness and Good Relations
13. The Book of Manners
14. The Book of Temperance and Repentance

== Publications ==
The book has been published by many organizations around the world:

- At-Targhib Wat Tarhib: Arabic Only Min al Hadith Al Sharif: Published: Dar Al Kotob Al-Ilmiyah (DKI), Beirut, Lebanon (2016) ISBN 978-2745105240
- At Targhib wat Tarhib 4 Vols (Arabic) by Hafiz Abu Bakr Ahmed al-Bazzar: Published:Maktaba Rasheedia Queeta

== Manuscripts ==
One notable manuscript of the saying was copied by Amina, bint al-Hajj ʿAbd al-Latif, a Moroccan woman who was a jurist and scribe, and is dated to 1802.

== See also ==
- List of Sunni books
