= Amina, bint al-Hajj ʿAbd al-Latif =

Moroccan jurist and scribe

- آمنة بنت الحاج عبد اللطيف
- Died: Tetouan, Morocco
- Resting place: Hawmat al-Mataymar, Tetouan
- Occupation: Jurist
- Years active: fl. 1802–1812
- Era: 19th century
- Known for: Manuscript copying and Islamic scholarship
- Notable work: Copy of At-Targhib wa al-Tarhib (1802); copy of the Qur'an (1812)

Amina bint al-Hajj ʿAbd al-Latif (Arabic: أمينة بنت الحاج عبد اللطيف; fl. 1802 - 1812) was a Moroccan jurist and scribe, who worked in Tetouan during the nineteenth century.

== Biography ==
In the nineteenth century it was more usual for men in the Islamic world to work as scribes than women. However in Spain and north Africa several women made it their careers. One such woman was Amina bint al-Hajj ʿAbd al-Latif, and whilst little is known of her early life, her training is referred to in the Tarikh Titwan (History of Tetouan) by Mohammed Daoud (1908–1984). There Daoud reports that she was taught law and scribal practice by her father.

It is known that she was active in Tetouan during the reign of Sultan Sulayman, and there are two works known to have been copied by her that have survived. The first is a final section of At-Targhib wat-Tarhib, a collection of sayings by the Prophet; the manuscript is dated to 1802. The second is a copy of the Qu'ran dated to 1812. She was notable for the fineness of her manuscript copying.

Whilst her date of death is unknown, it is recognised that she was buried at her home in Hawmat al-Mataymar (Metámar Quarter).
