= Muhammad Ulaysh =

Egyptian Muslim jurist

Muhammad ‘UIaysh

Personal life
- Born: 1802 CE (1217 AH); Cairo, Egypt Eyalet
- Died: 1882 CE (1299 AH); Cairo, Khedivate of Egypt
- Era: Ottoman Caliphate
- Region: Egypt
- Main interest: Fiqh

Religious life
- Religion: Islam
- Jurisprudence: Maliki
- Creed: Sunni
- Known for: Muslim jurist

Muhammad ‘UIaysh (1802 - 1882 CE) (1217 - 1299 AH) (Arabic: مُحَمَّدٌ عُلَيْش), more commonly referred to in Muslim works simply as ‘UIaysh or Sheikh ‘UIaysh, was a 19th-century CE Egyptian Muslim jurist of Tripolitanian origin. 'Illish was an important late scholar of the Maliki school of Islamic jurisprudence (fiqh). He is perhaps the last of a line of widely read and respected sources of traditional fatwas of the late Maliki school from an Azharite scholar. ‘UIaysh was an extremely popular teacher at Al-Azhar. His lectures were regularly attended by audiences of over 200 students. In July 1854, ‘UIaysh was appointed the Maliki Mufti of Al-Azhar. By the time of his death in 1882, ‘UIaysh was one of the premier leaders of Egyptian scholarly society. His Minah al-Jalil as well as his Fatawa are widely used today among traditional Malikis for fatwa positions of the school.

== See also ==
- List of Ash'aris and Maturidis
