= Fritz Krenkow =

German orientalist

Fritz Johann Heinrich Krenkow
- Born: 12 August 1872; Schönberg, Mecklenburg, Germany
- Died: 7 June 1952; Cambridge, England
- Occupations: Hosier; Arabic scholar
- Spouse(s): Ada Rose Beardsall; Ann Savidge
- Relatives: D. H. Lawrence (nephew-in-law)

Fritz Johann Heinrich Krenkow (Arabic: سالم الكرنكوي, romanized: Sālim al-Karankawi; 12 August 1872 – 7 June 1952) was a German orientalist. He was the uncle of D. H. Lawrence.

Krenkow was born in Germany and moved to England aged 12. He earned a living with a hosiery firm in Leicester, and later acquired a reputation as an Arabic scholar. By 1920, he had married D. H. Lawrence's maternal aunt, Ada, and they settled in Quorn, Leicestershire. He later became a professor at the Aligarh Muslim University during 1929-30, and then at University of Bonn 1931-35.
