= Safi al-Din al-Hindi =

Indian theologian (c. 1246 to 1316)

Safi al-Din al-Hindi صفي الدين الهِنْدي
- Title: Imam al-Mutakallimin

Personal life
- Born: 1246-47 Dehli sultanate
- Died: 1315-16 Damascus
- Main interest(s): Fiqh (Islamic jurisprudence), Usul al-Fiqh (principles of jurisprudence), Usul al-Din, Aqidah, Kalam (Islamic theology), Logic

Religious life
- Religion: Islam
- Denomination: Sunni
- Jurisprudence: Shafi'i
- Creed: Ash'ari

Muslim leader
- Influenced by: Al-Shafi'i Abu al-Hasan al-Ash'ari
- Influenced: Taj al-Din al-Subki Al-Safadi Shihab al-Din al-'Umari Ibn al-Zamalkani

Safi al-Din al-Hindi al-Urmawi (Arabic: صفي الدين الهندي الأرموي) was a prominent Indian Shafi'i-Ash'ari scholar and rationalist theologian.

Al-Hindi was sent in to debate Ibn Taymiyya during his second hearing in Damascus in 1306. Taj al-Din al-Subki, in his Tabaqat al-Shafi'iyya al-Kubra reports him to have said: "Oh Ibn Taymiyya, I see that you are only like a sparrow. Whenever I want to grab it, it escapes from one place to another."

He was praised by Taj al-Din al-Subki, al-Safadi, Shihab al-Din al-'Umari, Shams al-Din ibn al-Ghazzi, and 'Abd al-Hayy al-Hasani.

== Biography ==
Safi al-Din al-Hindi was born in Delhi and completed his Islamic education there before settling in Damascus. He visited Egypt and moved to Turkey, where he stayed for eleven years; five in Konya, five in Sivas, and one in Kayseri. He arrived in Damascus in the second half of the 13th century and stayed there until he died.

Safi al-Din al-Hindi studied under Siraj al-Din Urmavi and was said to have indirectly begun his studies with Fakhr al-Din al-Razi, whom he met through his maternal grandfather. He was the teacher of mutakallim (theologian) Sadr al-Din ibn al-Wakil (d. 1317) and Kamal al-Din ibn al-Zamalkani (d. 1327).

His students, Ibn al-Wakil and Ibn al-Zamalkani and he, had been directly involved in Ibn Taymiyyah's famous 1306 Damascene trials, which were addressed to restrain Ibn Taymiyyah's relentless anti-Ash'ari polemics.

== Books ==
Among his best-known writings:

- Al-Fa'iq fi Usul al-Fiqh (Arabic: الفائق في أصول الفقه)
- Nihayat al-Wusul fi Dirayat al-Usul (Arabic: نهاية الوصول في دراية الأصول)
- Al-Resalah al-Tis'iniyya fi al-Usul al-Diniyya (Arabic: الرسالة التسعينية في الأصول الدينية)

Al-Hindi's Tis'iniyya is a straightforward manual of Ash'ari kalam treating the traditional theological topics of God, prophecy, eschatology, and related matters.

At the beginning of the book, al-Hindi explains that the occasion for writing was a disturbance provoked by Hanbalis:

This treatise comprises ninety issues about the foundations of religion (Usul al-Din). I wrote it when I saw students from Syria devoting themselves to learning this discipline after the famous disturbance (fitna) that took place between the orthodox (Ahl al-Sunna wa al-Jama'a) and some Hanbalis.

This is not a direct refutation of Ibn Taymiyya, but it was most likely written in response to the challenge that he posed.

== See also ==
- 'Ala' al-Din al-Bukhari
- List of Ash'aris and Maturidis
- List of Muslim theologians
