= Khalil ibn Ishaq al-Jundi =

Egyptian scholar (14th-century)

- Died: c. 1365

Philosophical work
- Era: Medieval era
- School: Maliki

Khalil ibn Ishaq al-Jundi (died c. 1365), also known as Sidi Khalil, was an Egyptian jurisprudent in Maliki Islamic law who taught in Medina and Cairo. His Mukhtasar, known as the "Mukhtasar of Khalil", is considered an epitome of shariah law according to the Maliki madhhab, and is regarded as the most authoritative legal manual by North and West African Muslims.

== See also ==
- List of Ash'aris and Maturidis
