= Ibn al-Dawadari =

14th century Mamluk historian

Sayf al-Din Abū Bakr ibn ʿAbdallāh ibn Aybak al-Dawādārī (fl. 1309–1335), known as Ibn al-Dawādārī (Egyptian Arabic: ابن الدواداري), was a historian from Mamluk Egypt.

== Life ==
Abū Bakr ibn al-Dawādārī's date of birth is unknown and his background is obscure. He belonged to the awlād al-nās, the "sons of Mamlūks", that class of freeborn Muslims who had Mamlūk ancestors. His family may have been related to the Turkic Seljukids. He was the son of Jamāl al-Dīn ʿAbdallāh. His grandfather, Aybak, was the lord of Sarkhad, and possibly the same person as the ʿIzz al-Dīn Aybak al-Ustādār al-Muʿaẓẓamī who patronized Ibn Abī Uṣaybiʿa and died in 1247 or 1248. Both ʿAbdallāh and Aybak were buried in Adhriʿāt in Syria. His nickname comes from an ancestor who held the office of dawādār (chancellor).

Ibn al-Dawādārī spent his childhood in Cairo in the street called Ḥārat al-Bāṭiliyya. His father held a high government post until 1310, when he moved to Damascus. Ibn al-Dawādārī claims to have begun taking notes for his history in 1309 and to have moved with his father to Damascus. His father died in 1311. By 1323, he held an unspecified high government post, probably in the barīd (postal service) in Egypt.

His date of death is unknown.

== Works ==
Ibn al-Dawādārī wrote several works in Arabic, but few survive. The one for which he is most famous is the Kanz al-durar wa-jāmiʿ al-ghurar ('Treasure of Pearls and the Collection of Shining Objects'), an abridgement in nine parts of a longer universal history entitled Durar al-tījān. An autograph manuscript of the Kanz is known. Ibn al-Dawādārī claims to have worked on the final draft between 1331 and 1335. The last recorded event in his histories is from 1335.

The entirety of Kanz has been published in nine separate volumes between the years 1960 and 1994 at Cairo as Die Chronik des Ibn ad-Dawadari, part of the German series Quellen zur Geschichte des islamischen Ägyptens:

- Part 1, Kosmographie, ed. Bernd Radtke (1982)
- Part 2, Der Bericht über die alten Völker, ed. Edward Badeen (1994)
- Part 3, Der Bericht über den Propheten und die Rechtgeleiteten Chalifen, ed. Muḥammad as Saʿīd Ğamāl ad-Dīn (1981)
- Part 4, Der Bericht über die Umayyadan, ed. Gunhild Graf & Erika Glassen (1994)
- Part 5, Der Bericht über die ʿAbbasiden, ed. Dorothea Krawulsky
- Part 6, Der Bericht über die Fatimiden, ed. Ṣalāḥ ad-Dīn al-Munağğid (1961)
- Part 7, Der Bericht über die Ayyubiden, ed. Saʿīd ʿAbd al-Fattāḥ ʿĀšūr (1972)
- Part 8, Der Bericht über die frühen Mamluken, ed. Ulrich Haarmann (1971)
- Part 9, Der Bericht über den Sultan al-Malik an-Nāṣir Muḥammad ibn Qalaʾun, ed. Hans Robert Roemer (1960)

Ibn al-Dawādārī has valuable information on the Fatimids and is "one of the most interesting historians" of the Baḥrī dynasty. He frequently cites his father as a source for events in the last two parts of his history, but he seems to have exaggerated his father's importance by attributing to him information from other sources. Ibn al-Dawādārī may also have falsified his own genealogy. He breaks from traditional Arabic historiography in many ways. His writing style is more personal, "spiced with anecdotes" and, for the earlier periods, dependent in part on popular legends.

== Bibliography ==
- Guo, Li (2016). "Ibn al-Dawādārī". In Fleet, Kate; Krämer, Gudrun; Matringe, Denis; Nawas, John; Rowson, Everett (eds.). Encyclopaedia of Islam (3rd ed.). Brill Online. ISSN 1873-9830.
- Haarmann, Ulrich (1982). "Quellen zur Geschichte des islamischen Ägyptens". Mitteilungen des Deutschen Archäologischen Instituts, Abteilung Kairo. 38: 201–210.
- Hillenbrand, Carole (2007). "Sources in Arabic". In Mary Whitby (ed.). Byzantines and Crusaders in Non-Greek Sources, 1025–1204. The British Academy. pp. 283–340.
- Lewis, Bernard (1971). "Ibn al-Dawādārī". In Lewis, B.; Ménage, V. L.; Pellat, Ch. & Schacht, J. (eds.). The Encyclopaedia of Islam, Second Edition. Volume III: H–Iram. Leiden: E. J. Brill. p. 744. OCLC 495469525.
- Little, Donald P. (1998). "Historiography of the Ayyūbid and Mamlūk Epochs". In Carl F. Petry (ed.). The Cambridge History of Egypt. Vol. 1. Cambridge University Press. pp. 412–444.
