= Al-Nuwayri =

Egyptian historian, encyclopedist and calligrapher (1279-1333)

Shihab al-Din al-Nuwayri
- أحمد بن عبد الوهاب النويري
- Born: Ahmad ibn Abd al-Wahhab ibn Muhammad al-Bakri al-Nuwayri; 5 April 1279; Akhmim, Mamluk Sultanate
- Died: 5 June 1333 (aged 54); Cairo, Mamluk Sultanate
- Occupations: Historian, civil servant

Al-Nuwayrī, full name Shihāb al-Dīn Aḥmad bin ʿAbd al-Wahhāb al-Nuwayrī (Arabic: شهاب الدين أحمد بن عبد الوهاب النويري, 5 April 1279 – 5 June 1333) was an Egyptian Muslim historian and civil servant of the Bahri Mamluk dynasty. He is most notable for his compilation of a 9,000-page encyclopedia of the Mamluk era, titled The Ultimate Ambition in the Arts of Erudition (نهاية الأرب في فنون الأدب, Nihāyat al-arab fī funūn al-adab), which pertained to zoology, anatomy, history, chronology, amongst others. He is also known for his extensive work regarding the Mongols' conquest of Syria. Al-Nuwayri started his encyclopedia around the year 1314 and completed it in 1333.

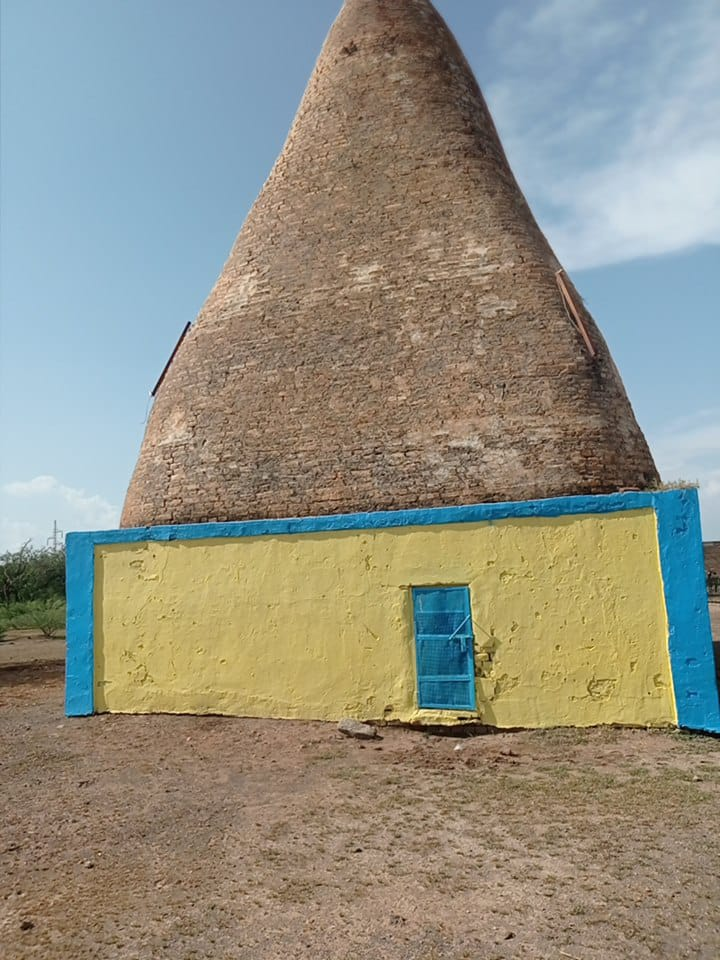
Maqam (shrine) of Sheikh Al-Nuwairi in the village of Al-Qara

== Life ==
The name Al-Nuwayri is a nisba referring to the village of Al-Nuwayra in present-day Beni Suef Governorate. Al-Nuwayri was born 5 April 1279, in Akhmim, Egypt. His family's lineage traced back to Abu Bakr al-Siddiq through his great-grandson Talha al-Khayr who was honored with the title Sultan al-Madinah for his elevated station of scholarship amongst the Tabi'un. For most of his childhood, he lived in Qus in Upper Egypt, where he studied with Ibn Daqiq al-'Id. He later studied at Al-Azhar University in Cairo, specializing in the study of the hadith and the sira, in addition to history. Skilled in calligraphy, he reportedly made a copy of Sahih al-Bukhari which he sold for 1000 dinars. He worked as a civil servant in the administration of Sultan An-Nasir Muhammad starting aged 23, serving in various roles including property manager for the Sultan and superintendent of army finances in Tripoli. At some point after 1312, he retired from government service and took a job copying manuscripts in order to support himself while compiling his encyclopedia. He died on 5 June 1333, in Cairo.

== Encyclopedia ==
Al-Nuwayri's encyclopedia, The Ultimate Ambition in the Arts of Erudition, was divided into five sections (books):

1. Geography and astronomy
2. Man, and what relates to him
3. Animals
4. Plants
5. History

The first four subjects comprised 10 volumes, while the last filled 21 volumes.

ِAl-Nuwayri based his encyclopedia on several earlier works. In fact, the only wholly original portions are the discussion of financial secretaryship in book two, and some of the historical material in book five. The rest of the work was a compilation of a number of texts including Delightful Concepts and the Path to Precepts (Mabahij al-fikar wa manahij al-'ibar) by Jamal al-Din al-Watwat and Avicenna's Canon of Medicine.

== Editions and translations ==
- Al-Nuwayri, Shihab Al-Din (2016). The Ultimate Ambition in the Arts of Erudition. Penguin Books. ISBN 978-0-14-310748-4.
- Shihāb al-Dīn Aḥmad ibn ʿAbd al-Wahhāb al-Nuwayrī, Nihāyat al-arab fī funūn al-adab (Cairo: al-Muʿassasa al-Miṣriyya al-ʿĀmma lil-Taʾlīf wa-l-Tarjama wa-l-Ṭibāʿa wa-l-Nashr, 1923–97)
- Shihāb al-Dīn Aḥmad ibn ʿAbd al-Wahhāb al-Nuwayrī, Nihāyat al-arab fī funūn al-adab (Beirut: Dār al-Kutub al-ʿIlmiyya, 2004)
