= Taqi al-Din =

Taqi al-Din (Arabic: تقي الدين Taqī al-Dīn; also spelled Taqi ad-Din, Taqieddin, Takieddine or Takiyüddin) is an Arabic name for men.

It may refer to:

- Al-Muzaffar Taqi al-Din Umar, or Al-Muzaffar Umar (? –1191), Ayyubid Amir
- Taqi ad-Din Ahmad Ibn Taymiyyah (1263–1328), Hanbali scholar
- Taqi al-Din al-Subki (1284–1355), Shafi'is scholar
- Taqi al-Din Ahmad ibn 'Ali ibn 'Abd al-Qadir ibn Muhammad Al-Maqrizi (1364–1442), Egyptian historian
- Taqi al-Din Muhammad ibn Ahmad al-Fasi (1373–1429), Muslim scholar, hafith, faqih, historian, and Maliki qadi (judge) in Mecca
- Taqi al-Din Muhammad ibn Ma'ruf (1526–1585), Ottoman polymath, scientist and engineer
- Muhammad Taqi-ud-Din al-Hilali (1893?–1987?), Moroccan religious scholar
- Takiyettin Mengüşoğlu (1905–1984), Turkish philosopher
- Takieddin el-Solh (1908–1988), Lebanese Prime Minister
- Taqiuddin al-Nabhani (1909–1977), founder of the Islamist political party Hizb ut-Tahrir
- Mohammed Takiyudin (born 1991), Ghanaian footballer
- Amine Takieddine (1884–1937), Lebanese writer, poet, lawyer, and political journalist
- Ziad Takieddine (1950–2025), Lebanese-French businessman
