= Taqi al-Din al-Subki =

Shafi'i Islamic scholar (1284–1355)

Imam Taqī al-Dīn al-Subkī تقي الدين السبكي
- Title: Sheikh ul-Islam; Qadi al-Qudat; Taqī al-Dīn; Al-Ḥāfiẓ

Personal life
- Born: 1284 Subk village, Egypt, Mamluk Sultanate
- Died: 1355 (aged 70–71) Damascus, Mamluk Sultanate
- Era: Medieval era
- Region: Egypt and Levant
- Main interest(s): Aqidah, Kalam (Islamic theology), Fiqh, Usul al-Fiqh, Usul al-Din, Hadith, Usul al-Hadith, Tafsir, Arabic grammar, Linguistic, Rhetoric, Philology, lexicographer, genealogy, History, Tasawwuf, Logic

Religious life
- Religion: Islam
- Denomination: Sunni
- Jurisprudence: Shafi'i
- Creed: Ash'ari

Muslim leader
- Influenced by: Al-Shafi'i Abu al-Hasan al-Ash'ari Ibn Daqiq al-'Id Ibn al-Rif'ah Al-Dimyati 'Ala al-Din al-Baji Abu Hayyan al-Gharnati Ibn Ata Allah al-Iskandari
- Influenced: Jamal al-Din al-Isnawi Taj al-Din al-Subki Siraj al-Din al-Bulqini Zain al-Din al-'Iraqi Ibn al-Mulaqqin Al-Safadi Firuzabadi

Abu Al-Hasan Taqī al-Dīn Ali ibn Abd al-Kafi ibn Ali al-Khazraji al-Ansari al-Subkī (Arabic: أبو الحسن تقي الدين علي بن عبد الكافي بن علي الخزرجي الأنصاري السبكي), commonly known as Taqī l-Dīn al-Subkī (Arabic: تقي الدين السبكي) was a Sunni Egyptian polymath and foremost leading Shafi'i jurisconsult, traditionist, Quranic exegete, legal theoretician, theologian, mystic, grammarian, linguist, rhetorician, philologist, lexicographer, genealogist, historian, logician, controversial debater, and researcher of his time. He served as the chief judge of Damascus for 17 years. He was the father of the great Taj al-Din al-Subki.

Al-Subki was regarded as one of the most influential and highly acclaimed scholars of the Mamluk period. He was famous for being the leading scholar, judge and teacher of his time. He was universally recognized as a mujtahid and was the greatest jurist in the Shafi'i school of his time. He was given the special title Sheikh al-Islam for mastering every Islamic field and was a prolific writer who wrote books in every science. His books were considered authoritative, regardless of what science he wrote in.

== Early life ==
=== Birth ===
Taqi al-Din al-Subki was born at the beginning of Safar in the year 683 AH, which corresponds to April 18, 1284 AD in the village of Subk al-Ahad (hence the name "Al-Subki") – one of the villages in the Monufia Governorate and he was taught in his childhood by his father, who provided him with the appropriate atmosphere for acquiring knowledge.

=== Education ===
He moved with his father to Cairo, where he was apprenticed to some notables of his time, headed by his father, Sheikh Abd al-Kafi al-Subki, and he was one of the deputies of Sheikh al-Islam Ibn Daqiq al-'Id in the judiciary, and he took great care of him to devote himself to seeking knowledge. He also travelled to acquire knowledge of hadith from the scholars of Syria, Alexandria and the Hijaz.

=== Teachers ===
He studied under the foremost leading scholars of his time and mastered these sacred sciences under them:

- Ibn al-Rif'ah who taught him Shafi'i jurisprudence
- Al-Dimyati who taught him Hadith
- 'Ala al-Din al-Baji who taught him principles of jurisprudence and theology
- Abu Hayyan al-Gharnati who taught him grammar
- Ibn Ata Allah al-Iskandari who taught him Tasawwuf
- Alam al-Din al-Iraqi who taught him Qu'ran exegesis
- Sayf al-Din al-Baghdadi, who taught him Islamic logic

== Scholarly life ==
=== Positions ===
During his scholarly life in Egypt, he was employed as a professor at the Cairo's prestigious Islamic educational institutions. He was summoned to Damascus in 739 AH (he was 66 years old at the time) to assume the position of head legal judge, which he retained for the next 17 years. In addition to his role as chief judge, he served as the preacher at the Umayyad mosque and he was employed as a professor at several leading educational institutions in Damascus, including al-Ghazzaliyya, al-Adiliyya, al-Atabakiyya, al-Mansuriyya, al-Shamiyya, al-Barraniyya, and the school of the prophetic traditions, Dar al-Hadith al-Ashrafiyya, which was the world's leading Hadith academy.

=== Students ===
He educated the foremost scholars of their time:

- Jamal al-Din al-Isnawi
- Taj al-Din al-Subki
- Siraj al-Din al-Bulqini
- Zain al-Din al-'Iraqi
- Ibn al-Mulaqqin
- Al-Safadi
- Firuzabadi

== Death ==
Then he died on Monday night, the third of Jumada al-Akhira, in the year 756 AH in Cairo, and was buried at Bab al-Nasr. When he died, it was called, “The last of Mujtahid has died, the proof of Allāh ﷻ on earth has died, the ʿĀlim of this era has died” and then the scholars carried his funeral.

Ibn al-Subki stated in his famous Tabaqat al-Shafi'iyya al-Kubra that whoever attended his funeral agreed that they had not seen any funeral having more people. Rather, it was said that other than the funeral of Shaykh al-Islām al-Subkī, none of the funerals was attended by more people after the funeral of Imām Ahmad.

== Views ==
Al-Subki staunchly defended the mainstream Sunni beliefs against the extremist minority and their heresy. Al-Subki belonged to the Sunni theological school of Ash'ari and in line with his school strongly opposed anthropomorphism. He also vehemently defended the Ashari view that Paradise and Hell Fire are eternal and to that end wrote a comprehensive treatise entitled "Al-I'tibar" in which he stated that: "The doctrine of the Muslims is that the Garden and the Fire will not pass away. Abu Muhammad ibn Hazm has transmitted that this is held by consensus and that whoever opposes it is an unbeliever by consensus". Subkī reiterates this elsewhere in the treatise although he is careful to clarify that he does not label any particular person an unbeliever. Al-Subki blamed Ibn Taymiyyah's misguidance for not learning the proper interpretation of classical texts from qualified transmitters. He was very harsh in criticizing Taymiyyah for deviating the Sunni community and distorting fundamental principles of the true Islamic creed. Al-Subki regarded him as one of the members of the Hashwiyya sect (an anthropomorphic sect that attribute God with direction, form and image).

Taqi al-Din al-Subi tried to outlaw philosophy since he was adamantly opposed to it. Additionally, he was against using Greek logic. He was quite critical, publishing refutations to anything he deemed as an innovation.

== Reception ==
- Al-Dhahabi said: “He is like Yahyā Ibn Maʿīn in Hadīth, Mālik and Sufyān in fatwā, Fakhr al-Dīn al-Rāzī in debating and research, Ibn Mālik and al-Mubarrad in grammar.”
- Al-Suyuti said: “He devoted himself to writing and giving legal opinion, authoring more than 150 works, his writings displaying his profound knowledge of hadith and other fields and his magisterial command of the Islamic sciences. He educated the foremost scholars of his time, was a painstaking, accurate, and penetrating researcher, and a brilliant debater in the disciplines. No previous scholar attained to his achievements in Sacred Law, of masterful inferences, subtleties in detail, and carefully worked-out methodological principles.”
- Salah al-Din al-Safadi said: “People say that no one like him had appeared since Ghazali, though in my opinion they thereby do him an injustice, for to my mind he does not resemble anyone less than Sufyan al-Thawri. With his vast erudition, he was at the same time a God-fearing ascetic in his personal life who was devoted to worship and mysticism, though vigilant and uncompromising in matters of religion and ready to assail any innovation (bid’a) or departure from the tenets of faith of Ahl al-Sunna”.
- Al-Suyuti also said: “The Imam, the jurist (Faqih), the traditionist (Muhaddith), the Hafidh, the exegete (Mufassir), the legal theoretician (Usuli), the theologian (Mutakallim), the grammarian (Nahwi), the linguist (Lughawi), the writer (Adib), the Mujtahid Taqi al-Din Abul Hasan ‘Ali bin ‘Abd al-Kafi bin ‘Ali bin Tammam bin Yusuf bin Musa bin Tammam bin Hamid bin Yahya bin ‘Umar bin ‘Uthman bin ‘Ali bin Miswar bin Sawwar bin Salim, the Shaykh al-Islam and Imam of [his] era.”
- His son Taj al-Din al-Subki said: “The people's leader who assembled all branches of knowledge. The distinctive [master] of his days. Ascending to incomputable heights. He wrote exegesis of the Qu'ran, in which he demonstrated that the source of knowledge handed over his guidance to him. In the Field of Hadith (the Prophet's maxima), caravans of those who seek valuable knowledge travelled to him from all over. In the subjects of the principles of Islamic jurisprudence (usul) he recorded excellency and in the branches of Islamic law (fiqh) he was extremely energetic. In the field of Arabic linguistics, throughout the universe he always served as a model. He comprehended philology, noun's and verb's declinations, and grammar. His poetic compositions were the best. He mastered genealogy and history, and the most obscure situations he understood assuredly. Eloquently he interpreted complex texts, and produced clear interpretations. In prosody, rhymes and istidlal, he did not encounter difficulty. In religious logic as well as in all other topics, he was the most knowledgeable, the instructor and the mentor.”

== Works ==
He left a large number of books, amounting to about (211) books in every field of Sharia sciences, some of which are printed and some that are still in manuscript form. Among his most important books are:

- Shifa' as-Siqam fi Ziarat khayr al'Anam (شفاء السقام في زيارة خير الأنام) - 'Cure for the Sick in Visiting the Best of Mankind' archive.org (in Arabic)
- Al-Sayf al-Saqil fi al-Radd ala Ibn Zafil (السيف الصقيل في الرد على ابن زفيل) - Refutation of Ibn al-Qayyim
- Al-Durra al-Mudiyya fi al-Radd 'ala Ibn Taymiyya (الدرة المضية في الرد على ابن تيمية) - Refutation to Ibn Taymiyya
- al-'Itibār bī baqā' al-janat wa'l-nār fi ar-rad 'ala ibn Taymiyah wa ibn al-Qiyam al-Qayilin bī fana' an-Nār. (الاعتبار ببقاء الجنة والنار في الرد على ابن تيمية وابن القيم القائلين بفناء النار) - Contemplation of the eternity of Paradise and Hell, A response to Ibn Taymiyah and Ibn al-Qayyim on the temporality of Hell.
- Naqid al-‘Ijtimā’ wa’l-‘Iftirāq fī Masā’il al'Aymān wa’t-Talāq (نقد الاجتماع والافتراق في مسائل الأيمان والطلاق) - 'Critique of Communion and Separation in Matters of Faith and Divorce.'
- Al-'Ashbāh wa’n-Naẓā’r (الأشباه والنظائر) - 'Analogues and Pairs' (in Arabic, 3 vols)
- Ibraz al-Hukam min hadīth rafa' al-Qalam (إبراز الحكم من حديث رفع القلم) - 'Illustration of ruling in hadith "Raising the Pen"'.
- Aintiqad Alliqa' Wliainfisal fi Masail al-Imam Waltalaqi (Criticism of meeting and separation in matters of faith and divorce)
- Itharat al-Fitnat fi 'Amr Altalaq (Raising discord in the matter of divorce)
- Shifa' al-Ghathayan fi Zirat khayr alnas (Healing sickness in visiting the best of people)
- Sayf Laen al-Rasul (The sword of the one who cursed the Messenger)
- Bayan Hakam Hadith Rafai al-Qalama (Highlighting the ruling from the hadeeth of raising the pen)
- Ahkam Kuli Ma Yushir 'Ilayhi (The provisions of all that it indicates)
- Bahjatan fi Sharh Tariqat al-Wusul 'ila Ilm al Usul Lilqadi Nasayr Aldiyn Al-Baydawi (Exhilaration in explaining the method on the method of access to the science of origins by Judge Nasir al-Din al-Baydawi)
- Al-Majmoo, Sharh al-Muadab, Walfarah fi Sharh Manhaj al'Iman Muhyi Aldiyn Al-Nawawi (Al-Majmoo', the explanation of the polite, and the joy in explaining the method of Imam Muhyi al-Din al-Nawawi)
- Al-Hamasat al-Wadihat Lil'Iman Li Abu Bakr Wa Umar Wa Uthman Wa Ali (The clear zeal of faith for Abu Bakr, Umar, Uthman and Ali)
- Sabab Aliamtinai an Qira'at al-Kishafati (The reason for refraining from reading the scout)
- Thulathiaat al-Musnad Al-Dirmi (Triads Musnad Al-Dirmi)
- Bayan al'Ithbat fi 'Ithbat al-Hilal (Statement of evidence in proving the crescent)

== See also ==
- List of Ash'aris
- List of Muslim theologians
- List of Sufis
