= Ibn Daqiq al-'Id =

13th-century Islamic scholar

Imam Ibn Daqīq al-ʿĪd
- ابن دقيق العيد
- Title: Shaykh al-Islam; Qadi al-Qudat; Taqi al-Din; Al-Ḥāfiẓ

Personal life
- Born: 1228 Yanbu
- Died: 1302 (aged 73–74) Cairo
- Era: Late Ayyubid and early Mamluk periods
- Region: Egypt
- Main interest(s): Hadith, Islamic jurisprudence, Principles of Islamic jurisprudence, Islamic theology
- Notable work(s): Al-Ilmam fi Ahadith al-Ahkam; Ihkam al-Ahkam
- Occupation: Scholar, Traditionist, Jurist, Legal Theoretician, Theologian

Religious life
- Religion: Islam
- Denomination: Sunni
- Jurisprudence: Shafi'i
- Creed: Ash'ari

Muslim leader
- Influenced by: Al-Shafi'i Abu al-Hasan al-Ash'ari Izz al-Din ibn 'Abd al-Salam Al-Mundhiri
- Influenced: Ibn al-Rif'ah Abu Hayyan al-Gharnati Al-Mizzi Ibn Sayyid al-Nas Al-Dhahabi al-Nuwayri Taqi al-Din al-Subki

Taḳī al-Dīn Abū ’l-Fatḥ Muḥammad b. ʿAlī b. Wahb b. Muṭīʿ b. Abi ’l-Ṭāʿa, (Arabic: تقي الدين أبو الفتح محمد بن علي بن وهب بن مطيع بن أبي الطاع); commonly known as Ibn Daqīq al-ʿĪd (Arabic: ابن دقيق العيد; 625-702 AH/ 1228–1302 CE), was a Sunni Egyptian scholar. He is widely accounted as one of Islam's great scholars in the fundamentals of Islamic law and belief, and was the leading authority in the Shafi'i legal school. He was a prominent jurist with several major works of law to his credit. He was also equally proficient in hadith. He was a highly acclaimed muhaddith and a prolific writer on hadith and ilm al-rijal. He was known as the leading traditionist in his time and it is reported he was “the most respected scholar of hadith in the thirteenth century.” Although Ibn Daqiq al-'Id mastered Shafi'i jurisprudence under Ibn 'Abd al-Salam, he was also well-versed in Maliki fiqh. He served as chief judge of the Shafi'i school in Egypt. He was regarded as a highly esteemed and pious judge in his own day. He excelled in numerous Islamic sciences and was an authority in Arabic language and scholastic theology. He was also noted for his great skills in poetry, oratory, and literature. According to Taqi al-Din al-Subki, there was a consensus among Muslims that Ibn Daqiq al-'Id "was a mujtahid mutlaq (absolute/autonomous mujtahid) with complete knowledge of legal sciences" as well as the mujaddid in the 7th Islamic century.

== Name ==
He inherited the name "Ibn Daqiq al-'Id" from his grandfather, who was said to have enjoyed wearing a bright white turban—one that was as white as the flour used to bake pastries—during the Eid holiday. Subsequently, the name was transferred to his son and then to Imam Taqi al-Din Muhammad ibn 'Ali ibn Wahb, who was frequently referred to as Ibn Daqiq al-‘Id.

== Early life ==
=== Birth ===
Ibn Daqiq birth was in Yanbu in the Ḥidjaz (not in Lower Egypt as indicated by Brockelmann) in Shaʿban 625 AH/July 1228 AD and was born into the Arab tribe of Banu Qushayr.

=== Education ===
He attended several halaqahs in the city of Qus after learning the Quran by heart as a young kid, and his father led him into the Maliki school of jurisprudence. Eventually on, nevertheless, his pursuit of knowledge led him to Sheikh Al-Baha 'Al-Qifti, a father's pupil. Alongside Sheikh Mohammad Abu Al-Fadl Al-Mursi, he also studied Arabic. In order to further pursue his education, he later moved to Cairo and studied under Imam Izz al-Din ibn 'Abd al-Salam, who was known as the "Sultanul Ulama." From the latter, he studied the laws and foundations of Shafi'i jurisprudence, and Imam Izz al-Din 'Ibn 'Abd al-Salam mentored him till the day of his death in AH 660 (1262 AD). In addition to this, he studied hadith extensively under the luminary hadith scholar, al-Mundhiri and mastered the science under him. After that, he travelled to Damascus to further study Hadith from experts there before eventually making his way back to Egypt and relocating to Qus, the city of his youth.

== Scholarly life ==
=== Teaching ===
According to the Maliki school, he was appointed as a judge upon his 37-year-old return to Qus. But his position was only temporary since he didn't feel comfortable with the fame that came with his newfound position. Soon after, he found himself returning to Cairo and teaching Prophetic traditions at Darul Hadith Al-Kamiliyyah, a school established in A.H. 621 (1224 AD) by Sultan Al-Kamil.

His proficiency in Hadith was quickly acknowledged, and he was given the title of "Shaykh of Darul Hadith," which is the highest honour in this special institution. He was renowned for his meticulousness and rigour, continuously investigating on the chains between hadiths.

Later on, he became a law teacher at Salahuddin al-Ayubi's Nasiriyyah School, which was constructed near Imam al-Shafi'i's grave and mostly served the Shafi'i school. Owing to his proficiency in both Shafi'i and Maliki law schools, he was invited to teach at Madrasah Fadiliyyah, a distinguished establishment that was also housing al-Qurtubi.

=== Chief Justice ===
Keeping this posture in mind, he did not give in to pressure to show favouritism. In one occasion, he disregarded the testimony of the Sultanate's Secretary, Monkutmar, stating that he was an untrustworthy man in an inheritance lawsuit. In response, Montkumar despatched a number of emissaries to persuade Ibn Daqiq to believe his account. Ibn Daqiq eventually resigned at Monkutmar's urging, unfazed by the move.

Additionally, he established a centre that would oversee the administration and care of orphans' belongings until they were adults. In Egypt, this was an unusual step and thus was considered a pioneer. He established a mechanism to monitor the welfare and general well-being of orphans.

Following the death of Judge Ibn Bint al-'Aziz, Imam Ibn Daqiq was approached to assume the post of chief justice in 695 A. H. (1296 CE). Though he was initially hesitant, he finally relented to the request, exposing himself to influential individuals within Egypt. Under his leadership, he maintained the need for Islamic law to be applied scrupulously and fairly.

=== Students ===
Ibn Daqiq al-'Id taught hadith and fiqh to the next leading generation of scholars:

- Ibn al-Rif'ah
- Ibn Jamil al-Ruba'i
- Abu Hayyan al-Gharnati
- Kamal al-Din al-Adfuwī
- Al-Mizzi
- Ibn Sayyid al-Nas
- Al-Dhahabi
- al-Nuwayri
- Taqi al-Din al-Subki

== Death ==
He died on Friday, the eleventh of Ṣafar in the year 702 AH, and was buried on Saturday at the foot of the Muqattam Hills, east of Cairo. It was considered a tragic day, and prayers were performed over him. His funeral was attended by the royal members of the Sultanate, and a large gathering of the nation. Ibn Daqiq al-'Id left behind many works in hadith and the sciences of jurisprudence, which the Arabic library continues to cherish to this day.

== Reception ==
The Zahiri hadith scholar, Ibn Sayyid al-Nas said: “I have not seen anyone like him among those I met, nor have I received knowledge from anyone more esteemed than him among those from whom I have narrated. He was well-versed in the sciences and excelled in their various disciplines. He was foremost in understanding the hidden defects (‘ilal) of hadith among his peers and was unmatched in this precious discipline in his time. He had deep insight and a sharp eye in navigating its intricate paths.

He had a remarkable ability to derive legal rulings and meanings from the Qur'an and Sunnah, and he excelled in both the transmitted and rational sciences. He was raised in silence and absorbed in the pursuit of knowledge.”

Al-Adfuwī says: “There is no doubt that he was among the people of ijtihād (independent legal reasoning), and none would dispute that except one given to obstinate denial. Whoever reflects on his words will realize that they demonstrate greater precision, strength, and knowledge than some of the earlier mujtahids, and are more refined.”

The great hadith master of the 18th century, Shah Waliullah Dehlawi, stated that no one since the time of the Sahabah had engaged in such deep, profound, and remarkable discussions in their commentary on Hadith as Imam Ibn Daqiq al-‘Id.

== Works ==
In his lifetime, Ibn Daqiq wrote many books on various religious sciences, and among the most famous of these books are:

=== Hadith ===
- Al-Iqtirah fi Ma'rifat Al-Istilah, this is a popular concise introduction to Hadith terminology and it contains the description of the terms used in the science of hadith. In it, Ibn Daqiq has discussed in an excellent way the Muhaddithin, the categories of narrators of hadith, the quality of hearing, tradition, and the definition of hadith that is agreed upon.
- Al-Ilmam fi Ahadith al-Ahkam, in two volumes, and it is one of the greatest works written in its field. This famous book contains a "collection" of hadiths that are related to commandments. Ibn Taymiyyah used to call this book Kitab al-Islam and used to say: "No book like it has been written." In view of the importance of this book, many scholars of hadith have written commentaries on it.
- Al-In'am fi Sharh al-Ilmam, it is the first and best commentary of his own work al-Ilmam fi Ahadith al-Ahkam. According to Ibn Hajar al-Asqalani, it is over 20 volumes.
- Ihkam al-Ahkam, it is considered the best commentary of Umdat al-Ahkam by Abd al-Ghani al-Maqdisi. In it contains a collection of hadiths classified on the chapters of jurisprudence, such as the chapter on purity, the chapter on ablution, and the chapter on tayammum. By explaining the book, he addressed the meanings of the hadith and its explanation, and deduced the rulings in it, and the sayings of the jurists about it and their differences.
- Tahf al-Labib fi Sharh al-Taqrib, a famous work on Rijal al-Hadith and is considered the best commentary of al-Taqrib by Abu Shuja' al-Isfahani.
- Sharh Arba'een Nawawi a popular commentary on Forty Hadith by al-Nawawi. His commentary has become so popular that it is virtually impossible for any scholar to write a serious book about the forty hadiths without quoting Ibn-Daqiq.

=== Fiqh and Usul al-Fiqh ===
- Sharh Khulasat al-Zubaydi fi al-Fiqh al-Shafi'i ("Explanation of Al-Zubaydi’s summary of Shafi’i jurisprudence")
- Sharh Mukhtasar Ibn al-Hajib fi al-Fiqh al-Malkii ("Explanation of Ibn al-Hajib’s summary of Maliki jurisprudence")
- Sharh Muqadimat al-Matrazi fi 'Usul al-Fiqh ("Explanation of Al-Matrazi’s introduction to the principles of jurisprudence")

== See also ==
- List of Ash'aris
