= Fath al-Din Ibn Sayyid al-Nas =

Egyptian theologian (1272–1334)

Ibn Sayyid al-Nas
- Born: 1272; Cairo
- Died: 1334

Philosophical work
- Era: Medieval era
- Region: Egypt
- School: Zahiri

Muhammad bin Muhammad al-Ya'mari, better known as Fatḥ al-Dīn Ibn Sayyid al-Nās, was a Medieval Egyptian theologian who specialized in the field of Hadith, or the recorded prophecies and traditions of the Muslim prophet Muhammad. He was well known for his biography of Muhammad.

== Life ==
Although Ibn Sayyid al-Nas was himself an Egyptian, he was descended from a Muslim Andalusian family from Seville. The family fled due to hostility from Christians, who eventually took the city in 1248. His grandfather Abu Bakr Muhammad bin Ahmad was born in 1200 and settled in Tunis, where Ibn Sayyid al-Nas' father was born in October 1247. His grandfather died in 1261.

Ibn Sayyid al-Nas died in the year 1334, corresponding to 734 in the Hijri calendar. He was known as an adherent of the Zahiri school of Sunni Islam.

== Work ==
Ibn Sayyid al-Nas' biography of the prophet Muhammad is well known. Some of the isnads, or chains of narration establishing the historicity of claims, are unique; Ibn Hisham, arguably the most respected classical biographer, included events in his version of the prophetic biography whose chains of narration are only available in Ibn Sayyid al-Nas' work. During his time, he was also considered one of Cairo's greatest composers of poetry in praise of Muhammad. Ibn Sayyid al-Nas along with Abu Hayyan al-Gharnati were often the presiding "judges" during poetic contests during the reign of Mamluk sultan Al-Nasir Muhammad. Slimane of Morocco, the sultan of Morocco in the early 1800s who greatly restricted the acceptable reading material in his sultanate, designated Ibn Sayyid al-Nas' prophetic biography as one of only two approved works.

Ibn Sayyid al-Nas was respected among hadith circles for his transmissions of a recension of Sahih al-Bukhari, the most significant collection of prophetic tradition in Sunni Islam. In regard to the widely reported raid of Hudhayl, Ibn Sayyid al-Nas' transmission is nearly identical to the narrations of Muhammad al-Bukhari himself, save seven small differences, six copyist errors and one difference in a single word.
