= Ibn al-Rif'ah =

13th-century Islamic scholar

- Title: Shaykh al-Islam; Najm al-Din

Personal life
- Born: 1247 CE Cairo, Ayyubid dynasty
- Died: 1310 (aged 62–63) Cairo, Mamluk Sultanate
- Region: Egypt
- Main interest: Fiqh
- Notable work(s): Al-Matlab fi Sharh al-Wasit; Kifayat al-Nabih Sharh al-Tanbih
- Occupation: Jurist, Scholar

Religious life
- Religion: Islam
- Denomination: Sunni
- Jurisprudence: Shafi'i
- Creed: Ash'ari

Muslim leader
- Influenced by: Al-Shafi'i Abu al-Hasan al-Ash'ari Abu Ishaq al-Shirazi Al-Ghazali Ibn Daqiq al-'Id
- Influenced: Taqi al-Din al-Subki Jamal al-Din al-Isnawi Taj al-Din al-Subki

Najm al-Dīn Abū l-ʿAbbās Aḥmad ibn Muḥammad ibn al-Rifʿa (Arabic: ابن الرفعة), commonly known as Ibn al-Rif'ah was regarded as the leading Shafi'i jurist in Mamluk Egypt. He was praised by a number of people for his unparalleled expertise in Fiqh and Hadith. He is known mainly for his commentaries on earlier works of law. Ibn Taymiyyah said: “I saw an old man with Shafi’i jurisprudence dripping from his beard” indicting his sea of knowledge and deep-mastery in the Shafi'i school of thought. Ibn al-Rif'ah's most famous teacher was Ibn Daqiq al-'Id and his most famous student was Taqi al-Din al-Subki.

== Name and lineage ==
He is Ahmed Ibn Mohammed Ibn Ali Ibn Murtafaa Ibn Hazem Ibn Ibrahim Ibn Abbas al-Ansari al-Bukhari al-Miṣri al-Shafi'i. He was well known for Ibn al-Rif'ah which was attributed to his second grandfather Murtafaa (Ibn Qazi) and went by the nickname Abu Abbas.

== Life ==
Ibn al-Rif'ah was born in the ancient city of Egypt called Fustat in (645 AH / 1247 AD). Being under siege and impoverished, Ibn al-Rif'ah began a craft that was unfit for him. He was held accountable by Taqi al-Din al-Sayegh, who also expressed regret for the pressing need. He was suggested to the judge by Al-Sayegh. He did not complete his studies in a single institution; rather, he attended several different ones. Occasionally, he was required to leave Cairo to attend classes in the science of hadith; one such trip was to Alexandria in order to be near his teacher, Al-Galilee Ibn Sawaf. He taught in a few schools during his career, including Al-Maaziya School in Egypt, Al-Tiberias School, and others. He then resigned from his position as a teacher to work as a volunteer for Sheikh Najm Al-Din al-Balsi as a blessing. In addition, he held a number of positions in the state's judiciary before being given control of Egypt's government and leading the country's religious body for more than eight years until his passing. He was assigned to work, worked on the classification and categorised some classifications, profited from Islam and Muslims, was enthusiastic about science and education, and had stiff joints that made it painful for him to simply put on clothes. Despite this, he was always working and reading.

== Death ==
The jurist Najm al-Din Ibn al-Rif'ah passed away in Cairo, Egypt, on Friday night, the twelfth of Rajab of the year (710 AH / 1310 AD). He was roughly sixty-two years old and was buried in Al-Qarafah (Khatib).

== Legacy ==
Ibn al-Rif'ah was raised in a household of common Muslims and poor people, but this did not stop him from pursuing a career in science. As a science student, he persisted, working until he achieved jurisprudence excellence and became well known for it. Jamal al-Din al-Isnawi said: "It was in the custom of some jurists have been signed with the term of jurisprudence, even became a note if referred to him" with his participation in other sciences such as Arabic and its origins, if the jurist released to him is not involved in his time.

He was a marvel at quoting Sahaba's sayings and Shafi'i texts. A religious philanthropist, he had studied and given legal opinions for many years, and generally helped Shafi'i students. Ultimately, he oversaw the jurisprudence of the day.

== Reception ==
Ibn Tulun said "Scientist Sheikh, Sheikh of Islam, and a bearer the flag of Shafi'is in his time."

== Works ==
The Al-Matlab fi Sharh al-Wasit, written in 60 volumes by Ibn al-Rif'ah, is the most significant commentary on al-Wasit by al-Ghazali. He also authored Jawahir al-Bahr al-Muhbit which was an abridgement on a commentary of al-Wasit called Bahr al-Muhit by Najm al-Din Ahmad al-Qamuli (d. 1327).

He authored Kifayat al-Nabih Sharh al-Tanbih in 21 volumes which is a famous commentary on Al-Tanbih by Abu Ishaq al-Shirazi.

Ibn al-Rif'ah wrote a fatwa entitled Risala fi l'kanais wa-l-biya in 1301, and then in 1307 wrote an abridgement entitled al-Nafa'is fi Hadm al-Kana'is (items of value concerning the demolition of churches), also known as Kitab al-Nafa'is fi Adillat Hadm al-Kana'is.

== Source ==
Warood Nouri Hussein Al-Moussawi (2020). International Journal of Innovation, Creativity and Change (PDF). Vol. 11. Iraq: University of Al-Qadisiyah. p. 691-693.
