= Abu Tahir al-Silafi =

12th-century Islamic scholar

- Title: Shaykh al-Islām; Al-Ḥāfiẓ

Personal life
- Born: 478 AH/1085 AD Isfahan
- Died: 576 AH/1180 AD Alexandria, Ayyubid dynasty
- Main interest(s): Hadith, Fiqh, Biographical Evaluation
- Education: Nizamiyya of Baghdad
- Occupation: Muhaddith, Scholar, Muslim Jurist, Biographer

Religious life
- Religion: Islam
- Denomination: Sunni
- Jurisprudence: Shafi'i
- Creed: Ash'ari

Muslim leader
- Influenced by: Al-Shafi'i Abu Hasan al-Ash'ari Al-Kiya al-Harrasi
- Influenced: Ibn Tahir al-Maqdisi Abd al-Ghani al-Maqdisi Al-Mundhiri

Abū Ṭāhir al-Silafī (Arabic: أبو طاهر السلفي; born Isfahan in 472 AH/1079 CE, died Alexandria in 576/1180), was one of the leading scholars of hadith in the twelfth century CE. He was an esteemed Shafi'i hadith scholar from Isfahan who taught for many years at the 'Adiliyya madrassa in Alexandria, where he was frequently visited by pupils from all over the Muslim world, including Al-Andalus. He lived to be a hundred years old possessing the world's shortest chains and well known for his great memory and precision.

== Biography ==
The revered hadith transmitter and jurist Abu Tahir al-Silafi left his birth town of Isfahan at a young age and travelled to Baghdad to further his studies. He met with Al-Kiya al-Harrasi, who at the time was the Müderris in the Nizamiyya of Baghdad and studied under him. Soon later, he left and began roaming around the Islamic lands narrating hadiths and writing down biographies of people whom he narrated from. He arrived in Alexandria in 511/117 and made his home there. Al-Silafī ran the second madrasa to be built in Egypt (and the first Shāfi‘ī one there), built in Alexandria in 1149 on the order of Alexandria's then-governor, the Shāfi‘ī al-‘Ādil ibn Salār, vizier to Caliph al-Ẓāfir. It was named ‘Ādiliyya after its founder, but became popularly known as al-Silafiyya after its leading teacher. Probably in 1118, al-Silafī married Sitt al-Ahl bint al-Khalwānī; their daughter Khadīja (d. 1226) married the scholar Abu’l-Ḥarām Makkī b. ‘Abd al-Raḥmān al-Ṭrabulsī, whose son, Abu’l-Qāsim ‘Abd al-Raḥmān (born 1174), also became an important scholar in Alexandria.

== Legacy and Students ==
The transfer of religious knowledge from Isfahan to Alexandria was greatly aided by al-Silafi. The three mu'jams of Hadith with enhanced isnads were compiled by al-Silafi, and his disciples, including notable tabaqa scholars like Ibn Tahir al-Maqdisi, Abd al-Ghani al-Maqdisi, and Abd al-Qadir al-Ruhawi, highly valued these compilations. His other known students include the hadith scholar Ibn al-Mufaddhal and the linguist and historian, Abu al-Hajjaj al-Balawi.

== Works ==
Among his popular works is the Mu‘jam al-safar (The Dictionary of Travel), a biographical dictionary: 'covering from 511/1117 to 560/1164, the Mu‘jam can be regarded as a digest of intellectual life in late Fāṭimī Alexandria'. His other famous similar works include: (The Dictionary of the scholars of Isfahan) and (The Dictionary of The Scholars of Baghdad).

== Key studies ==
- Rizzitano, U. “Akhbār ‘an ba‘ḍ muslimī ṣiqilliya alladhīna tarjama la-hum Abū Ṭāhir al-Silafī,” Annals of the Faculty of Arts, Uni. of ‘Ayn Shams, 3 (1955): pp. 49-112
- ‘Abbās, I. Akhbār wa tarājim Andalusiyya al-mustakhraja min Mu ‘jam al-safar li al-Silafī. Beirut, 1963
- Zaman, S.M. Abū Ṭāhir al-Silafī al-Iṣbahānī. His life and works with an analytical study of his Mu‘jam al-safar. PhD thesis, Harvard Univ., Cambridge (Mass.), 1968
- Ṣāliḥ, Ḥ. The life and times of al-Ḥāfiẓ Abū Ṭāhir al-Silafī accompanied by a critical edition of part of the author’s Mu‘jam al-safar. PhD thesis, Univ. of Cambridge, 1972
- Ma ‘rūf, B. A. “Mu‘jam al-safar li-Abī Ṭāhir al-Silafī,” al-Mawrid, 8 (1979): pp. 379–383
- Zaman, S.M. Mu‘jam al-safar. Islamabad, 1988

== Sources ==
- Cortese, Delia (2012). "Transmitting Sunnī Learning in Fāṭimid Egypt: The Female Voices". 26th Congress of the Union Européenne des Arabisants et Islamisants (UEAI 26), 12-16 Sep 2012, Basel, Switzerland. Archived from the original on 10 September 2017.
