= Ibn al-Hajib =

Maliki jurist

- Born: After 1174/5; Asna, Upper Egypt
- Died: 1249; Alexandria
- Other names: Jamāl al-Dīn abū ʿAmr ʿUthmān ibn ʿUmar ibn Abī bakr al-Mālikī
- Occupations: Grammarian, Jurist
- Known for: Prominent Maliki faqīh
- Notable work: al-S̲h̲āfiya, al-Kāfiya, al-Amālī, al-Ḳaṣīda al-muwas̲h̲s̲h̲aḥa bi ’l-asmāʾ al-muʾannat̲h̲a, Risāla fi ’l-ʿus̲h̲r, S̲h̲arḥ, al-Muḳaddima al-Ḏj̲uzūliyya, K. al-Maḳṣad al-d̲j̲alīl fī ʿilm al-k̲h̲alīl, ʿAḳīda, Iʿrāb baʿḍ āyāt min al-Ḳurʾān al-ʿaẓīm, Muntahā ’l-suʾāl wa ’l-amal fī ʿilmay al-uṣūl wa ’l-d̲j̲adal and al-Muk̲h̲taṣar fi ’l-furūʿ or D̲j̲āmiʿ al-Ummahāt

Jamāl al-Dīn abū ʿAmr ʿUthmān ibn ʿUmar ibn Abī bakr al-Mālikī (died in 1249 in Alexandria), known as Ibn al-Ḥājib, was a Kurdish grammarian and jurist who earned a reputation as a prominent Maliki faqīh.

== Life ==
Ibn al-Hajib was born after 1174/5 in the village of Asna in Upper Egypt to a father who worked as a chamberlain for Emir lzz al-Din Musak al-Salahi. Ibn al-Hajib studied Islamic studies in Cairo with success, especially with al-Shatibi and al-G̲h̲aznawī. According to local documents from the 1210s, he taught in Cairo until about 1220/21 before moving to Damascus, where he taught at the Maliki zawiya in the Great Mosque. He was expelled from Damascus after a dispute with the Ayyubid ruler of Damascus As-Salih Ismail between 1240 and 1242. He moved back to Cairo and afterwards Alexandria and ultimately died in 1249.

Students of Ibn al-Hajib include Ibn al-Munayyir who was a teacher of Abu Hayyan al-Gharnati.

== Work ==
As a jurist, he was the first to merge the doctrines of Egyptian Maliki with those of the Maghreb and as a grammarian mastered the genre of resume and commentary to such a degree that his work was used by a long list of commentators. His works include al-S̲h̲āfiya, al-Kāfiya, al-Amālī, al-Ḳaṣīda al-muwas̲h̲s̲h̲aḥa bi ’l-asmāʾ al-muʾannat̲h̲a, Risāla fi ’l-ʿus̲h̲r, S̲h̲arḥ, al-Muḳaddima al-Ḏj̲uzūliyya, K. al-Maḳṣad al-d̲j̲alīl fī ʿilm al-k̲h̲alīl, ʿAḳīda, Iʿrāb baʿḍ āyāt min al-Ḳurʾān al-ʿaẓīm, Muntahā ’l-suʾāl wa ’l-amal fī ʿilmay al-uṣūl wa ’l-d̲j̲adal and al-Muk̲h̲taṣar fi ’l-furūʿ or D̲j̲āmiʿ al-Ummahāt.
