= Izz al-Din ibn 'Abd al-Salam =

Islamic scholar (1181–1262)

Al-‘Izz ibn ’Abd is-Salām
- Title: Sulṭān al-‘Ulamā; Shaykh al-Islam

Personal life
- Born: AH 577 (1181-1182 CE) Damascus, Abbasid Caliphate
- Died: AH 660 (1262 CE) Cairo, Abbasid Caliphate
- Era: Medieval era
- Region: Arab World
- Main interest(s): Islamic theology Hadith; Islamic jurisprudence

Religious life
- Religion: Islam
- Jurisprudence: Shafi'i
- Creed: Ash'ari

Muslim leader
- Influenced by: Ibn Asakir, Sayf al-Din al-Amidi, Suhrawardi, Abul Hasan al-Shadhili
- Influenced: Ibn Daqiq al-Eid

Abū Muḥammad ʿIzz al-Dīn ʿAbd al-ʿAzīz bin ʿAbd al-Salām bin Abī al-Qāsim bin Ḥasan al-Sulamī al-Shāfiʿī (Arabic: أبو محمد عز الدين عبد العزيز بن عبد السلام بن أبي القاسم بن حسن السُّلَمي الشافعي; 577 AH - 660 AH / 1262 CE), also known by his titles, Sultan al-'Ulama/ Sulthanul Ulama, Abu Muhammad al-Sulami, was a famous mujtahid, Ash'ari theologian, jurist and the leading Shafi'i authority of his generation. He was described by Al-Dhahabi as someone who attained the rank of ijtihad, with asceticism and piety and the command of virtue and forbidding of what is evil and solidity in religion. He was described by Ibn al-Imad al-Hanbali as the sheikh of Islam, the imam of the scholar, the lone of his era, the authority of scholars, who excelled in jurisprudence(Fiqh), theology(Aqidah) and the Arabic language, and reached the rank of ijtihad, and received students who traveled to him from all over the country.

Al-Izz Bin Abdul Salam was born in Damascus, present-day Syria, in 577 AH (1181 AD), where he grew up. He studied the sciences of the Sharia and the Arabic language, and he preached at the Umayyad Mosque and taught in the corner of Al-Ghazali. He was famous for his knowledge until he reached out to students from the country, which led to his incarceration. He then migrated to Egypt, where he was appointed a judge, and he taught and advised, and was appointed to preach at the Mosque of Amr Ibn Al-As, and incited people to fight the Mongols and the Crusaders, and participated in jihad himself. He died in Cairo in the year 660 AH (1262 AD).

== Birth and education ==
Ibn 'Abd al-Salam was born in Damascus in 577 AH. He received his education in Damascus by such scholars as Ibn Asakir and Jamal al-Din al-Harastani in Sacred law, Sayf al-Din al-Amidi in usul al-Fiqh and theology, and Tasawwuf with Suhrawardi and Abul Hasan al-Shadhili.

== Imprisonment ==
In Damascus, as sermon giver (khatib) of the Umayyad Mosque, he openly defied what he considered to be unsanctioned customs followed by the other sermon givers: he refused to wear black, refused to say his sermons in saj' rhymed prose and refused to praise the princes. When al-Salih Ismail, Emir of Damascus, made capitulatory concessions to Theobald I of Navarre during the Barons' Crusade, ibn 'Abd al-Salam condemned him from the pulpit and omitted mentioning him in the post-sermon prayer. He was consequently jailed and upon release emigrated to Ayyubid Egypt.

== Departure From Damascus ==
His departure from Damascus was marked by a significant trial that involved the Ayyubid sultan, al-Mālik al-Ashrāf Mūsā ibn al-Mālik al-ʿĀdil ibn Ayyūb. The latter was an admirer of al-Salam and his knowledge. However, he was influenced by a particular faction of scholars who adhered to a more literalist approach to theology. They accused him of having deviant beliefs because of his adherence to the Ashʿarī doctrine.

Al-Salam wrote a treatise, which would go on to become his celebrated work of creed. In it, he argued for God's transcendence and against anthropomorphism and corporealism. He then sent it to the sultan, who was angered and accused al-Salam of deviant beliefs. The scholars present remained silent and did not rebuke the sultan's false accusation.

Al-Salam was defended by his colleague, Imām Jamāl al-Dīn ibn al-Ḥājib, who rebuked them, saying, "Why did you not clarify that what Ibn ʿAbd al-Salām stated in his doctrine is the doctrine of the majority of the early and later scholars?" He then persuaded them to compose a joint statement affirming al-Salam's orthodoxy. They did so and this defused the tension.

However, the incident contributed to al-Salam's departure to Egypt.

== Egypt ==
Having left Damascus, Ibn 'Abd al-Salam settled in Cairo where he was appointed chief judge and Imam of the Friday prayer, gaining such public influence that he could (and did) command the right and forbid the wrong with the force of the law.

Ibn 'Abd al-Salam later resigned from the judiciary and undertook a career as a teacher of Shafi'i law at the Salihiyya, a college founded in the heart of Cairo by al-Malik al-Salih which had then barely been completed and which was, in Egypt, the first establishment providing instruction in the four rites. The biographers indicate that he was the first to teach Qur'anic commentary in Egypt.

Ibn 'Abd al-Salam's exploits eventually earned him the title Sultan al-'Ulema (Sultan of the scholars).

== Name and lineage ==
According to the consensus of scholars and the consensus of the approved sources, His name was ʿAbd al-ʿAzīz ibn ʿAbd al-Salām ibn Abī al-Qāsim ibn Ḥasab ibn Muḥammad ibn Muhaddhab al-Sulamī, Abū Muḥammad ʿIzz al-Dīn.

He was born into a poor and uncelebrated family, so very little is known about the family's background or his upbringing. However, there is evidence that his family originated in the Maghreb. Ibn Ḥajar, the noted muhaddith and historian has stated this explicitly. And there is a corroborating report that he once said to his colleague and close friend, Ibn al-Ḥājib (d. 646/1249), "How amazing is the affair between us. I am of Maghrebi origin, yet Shāfiʿī, while you are a Kurd and Mālikī."

Some sources also attribute him to the Banū Sulaym tribe.

== Works ==
He produced a number of brilliant works in Shafi'i jurisprudence, Qur'anic jurisprudence tafsir, methodological fundamentals in Sacred Law, formal legal opinion, government and Sufism though his main and enduring contribution was his masterpiece on Islamic legal principles transl. ara – transl. Qawa'id al-ahkam fi masalih al-anam. Some of his more popular works are on:

Qur'an

1. Tafsir al-Qur'an al-Azim,
2. Mukhtasar al-Nukat wa'l 'Uyun lil Imam al-Mawardi,
3. Al-Isharah ila al-Ijaz,
4. Fawa'id fi Mushkil al-Qur'an
5. Amali

Hadith / Sirah

1. Mukhtasar Sahih Muslim,
2. Bidayat al-Sul fi Tafdhil al-Rasul; available in its translated form as The Beginning of The Quest of the High Esteem of the Messenger
3. Targhib Ahl al-Islam fi Sakni al-Sham,

Aqeedah

1. Al-Mulhat fi I'tiqad Ahl al-Haqq or by its other title; al-Radd 'ala al-Mubtadi'ah wa'l Hashawiyah; transmitted by his son 'Abd al-Latif.
2. Al-Farq bayn al-Iman wa'l Islam or Ma'na al-Iman wa'l Islam,
3. Al-Anwa' fi 'ilm al-Tawhid,
4. Bayan Ahwal al-Nas yawm al-Qiyamah,

Tasawwuf / Raqa'iq

1. Shajarat al-'Arif wa'l Ahwal wasalih al-Aqwal wa'l A'mal,
2. Al-Fitan wa'l Balaya wa'l Mihan,
3. Mukhtasar Ra'ayah al-Muhasibi or Maqasid al-Ri'ayah li Huquqillah,

Usool

1. Qawa'id al-Kubra or by its full title; Qawa'id al-Ahkam fi Masalih al-Anam. Its popular commentary is available by Imam al-Qarafi who was one of his students.
2. Al-Qawa'id al-Sughra, or al-Fawa'id fi Mukhtasar al-Qawa'id; is an abridgement of the above title.
3. Al-Imam fi Bayan Adillat al-Ahkam, or ad-Dala'il al-Muta'aliqah bi'l Mala'ikah wa'l Nabiyin,

Fiqh

1. Al-Ghayah fi Ikhtisar al-Nihayah; is an abridgement of Nihayat al-Matlab fi Dirayat al-Madhab of imam al-Haramayn al-Juwayni.
2. Al-Jam' bayaan al-Hawi wa'l Nihayah; not known to have finished it.

Al-Fatawa al-Misriyyah, Al-Fatawa al-Musiliyyah, At-Targhib 'an Salat al-Ragha'ib, or by another title; al-Targhib 'an Salat al-Ragha'ib al-Mawdu'ah wa bayan ma fiha min Mukhalafat al-Sunan al-Mashru'ah, or by another title; Risalat fi Dhamm Salat al-Ragha'ib.

1. Risalat fi Radd Jawaz Salat al-Ragha'ib or by the title of Risalat fi Tafnid Radd Ibn al-Salah,
2. Maqasid al-Sawm,
3. Manasik al-Hajj,
4. Maqasid al-Salah,
5. Ahkam al-Jihad wa Fadha'ilihi,

== Reception ==
Zaki al-Din al-Mundhiri, the Shafi'i jurist, hadith expert and author stated that, "We used to give legal opinions before shaykh 'Izz al-Din arrived; now that he is among us we no longer do so."

Qarafi describes Ibn 'Abd al-Salam as a "staunch defender of the sunna who had no fear of those in power."

A number of sources report that Ibn 'Abd al-Salam reached the level of ijtihad transcending the Shafi'i madhab altogether.

== Death ==
He died in Cairo in 660 AH.

== See also ==
- List of Ash'aris and Maturidis
