= Wali al-Din al-'Iraqi =

Egyptian Islamic scholar (1361–1423)

Imam Walī al-Dīn al-'Irāqī
- ولي الدين العراقي
- Title: Wali al-Din; Al-Ḥāfiẓ

Personal life
- Born: 4 October 1361 Cairo
- Died: 5 August 1423 (aged 63) Cairo
- Era: Mamluk period
- Region: Egypt
- Main interest(s): Hadith sciences, Islamic jurisprudence, Legal theory, Tafsir, Arabic
- Occupation: Scholar, Qadi, Traditionist, Jurist, Legal theorist, Quran exegete, Linguist

Religious life
- Religion: Islam
- Denomination: Sunni
- Jurisprudence: Shafi'i
- Creed: Ash'ari

Muslim leader
- Influenced by: Al-Shafi'i Abu Hasan al-Ash'ari Zain al-Din al-Iraqi Siraj al-Din al-Bulqini Ibn al-Mulaqqin Nur al-Din al-Haythami
- Influenced: Al-Kamal ibn al-Humam Al-Mahalli Taqi al-Din al-Fasi

Walī al-Dīn Abū Zur'ah Aḥmad ibn 'Abd al-Raḥīm (Arabic: ولي الدين أبو زُرعة أحمد بن عبد الرحيم), more commonly known as Walī al-Dīn al-'Irāqī (Arabic: ولي الدين العراقي) or sometimes Ibn al-'Irāqī (Arabic: ابن العراقي; 723-804 AH/ 1323–1401 CE) was a Sunni Egyptian scholar and a prominent figure in the intellectual life of the medieval Islamic world. A multidisciplinary scholar, he specialized in Shafi'i jurisprudence, legal theory, hadith sciences, Quran exegesis, and Arabic language. Renowned for his meticulous scholarship and rigorous research, he was widely regarded as one of the leading ḥadīth authorities of his era. He was the son of Zain al-Din al-Iraqi.

== Early life ==
=== Birth ===
He was born at dawn on Monday, the third day of Dhu al-Hijjah in the year 762 AH (4 October 1361 CE) in Cairo.

=== Education ===
His father, Zayn al-Dīn al-ʿIrāqī, was a well-known hadith scholar of his time. His mother, Umm Aḥmad ʿĀʾisha al-ʿAlāʾī, was also a woman interested in hadith; in 765 (1364), she accompanied her husband when he travelled to Damascus for study and benefited from the hadith scholars there. Ibn al-ʿIrāqī first studied under his father, and later under scholars such as Abū'l-Ḥaram Muḥammad b. Muḥammad al-Qalānisī, ʿIzz al-Dīn Ibn Jamāʿa, and Ibn Nubāta al-Miṣrī. His father took him to Damascus when he was three years old, ensuring that he attended the lessons of hadith scholars such as Abū’l-Maḥāsin al-Ḥusaynī, Ibn Rāfiʿ, and Sittu'l-ʿArab. From there, his father brought him to Jerusalem, where he received ijāzas from the leading scholars of Damascus. When Ibn al-ʿIrāqī returned to Cairo, he began memorizing the Quran and various texts from different disciplines. He benefited from scholars such as Ibn ʿAbd al-Barr al-Subkī, Nāṣir al-Dīn Muḥammad b. ʿAlī al-Ḥarāwī, Juwairiya bint Aḥmad al-Hakkāriyya, and Jamāl al-Dīn ʿAbdullāh b. ʿAlī al-Bājī.

In 768 (1367), he travelled with his father to Hejaz. In Medina he heard hadith from Badr al-Dīn Ibn Farḥūn, and in Mecca from Bahāʾ al-Dīn Ibn Aqīl, Umm al-Ḥasan Fāṭima bint Aḥmad al-Kharāzī, and Abū'l-Faḍl Muḥammad b. Aḥmad al-Numayrī. After 780 (1378), he made a second journey to Damascus with his brother-in-law and teacher Nūr al-Dīn al-Haythamī, benefiting from various scholars there. Having trained himself in various sciences especially hadith, jurisprudence (fiqh), and legal theory (usul al-fiqh). He wrote comparative notes (ṭibāq), recorded names meticulously, and read to the leading scholars who heard his recitation. He continued to rise in rank due to his sharp intelligence until he excelled and distinguished himself.

=== Teachers ===
His most important teachers include:

- Zain al-Din al-Iraqi
- Siraj al-Din al-Bulqini
- Ibn al-Mulaqqin
- Nur al-Din al-Haythami

== Scholarly life ==
=== Career ===
Ibn al-ʿIrāqī was both a legal and hadith instructor in Cairo. He held teaching posts in hadith at the Kāmiliyya Dār al-Ḥadīth, Qānibayhiyya Qarāsunguriyya, and the Mosque of Ibn Tulun, and in Shafi'i jurisprudence at the Jamāliyya al-Nāṣiriyya and Fāḍiliyya madrasases. His father revived the tradition of hadith-dictation circles following a long hiatus, Ibn al-ʿIrāqī continued them after his father's death, beginning in Shawwāl 810 (March 1408), and dictated hadith in more than six hundred sessions. From the early 790s (1388) onward, over a span of twenty years, he served at various times as deputy judge (qāḍī nāʾib) in place of Aḥmad b. ʿĪsā al-Karakī, and he also held the judgeship of Manūfiyya. During this period, he additionally assumed the office of haykh al-shuyūkh at the Jamāliyya al-Nāṣiriyya Madrasa. Following the death of Jalāl al-Dīn al-Bulqīnī, he was appointed by Sultan Sayf al-Din Tatar as the chief judge (Qadi al-Qudat) of Egypt on 15 Shawwāl 824 (13 October 1421). His companion Ibn Ḥajar al-ʿAsqalānī occasionally served as his deputy during this tenure, which lasted thirteen months and twenty-one days. His dismissal after being accused before the Mamluk Sultan al-Malik al-Ashraf Sayf al-Dīn Barsbāy by several individuals, including some of his own students caused him great distress.

=== Students ===
He taught many students, including most notably:

- Ibn al-Humām
- Al-Maḥallī
- Taqī al-Dīn al-Fāsī
- Sharaf al-Din al-Munāwī
- Ṣāliḥ b. ʿUmar al-Bulqīnī
- Al-Shumunnī

== Death ==
He died in Cairo on Thursday, the seventeenth of the month of Sha'bān in the year 826 AH (5 August 1423 CE). He was sixty-three years and eight months old. As Ibn Hajar mentions, the cause of his death was that he assumed the position of judge after Qāḍī Jalāl al-Dīn al-Balqīnī. He held the office for a year and a quarter, administering it well, with chastity, integrity, and firmness in religion, until some members of the state became hostile toward him, and he was removed from the position. This distressed him greatly, and his temperament became disturbed until he died of illness in the abdomen, as a martyr, on Thursday. He was buried beside his father's grave in the desert outside the city.

== Legacy ==
Ibn al-ʿIrāqī's student Taqī al-Dīn al-Fāsī stated that his teacher was a scholar well-versed in issues of jurisprudence, legal theory, Qur’anic exegesis, and the Arabic language, and that he issued accurate legal verdicts. Scholars such as Ibn Ḥajar, Ibn Taghrībirdī, and al-Dāwūdī noted that he was also distinguished by his prodigious memory and exceptional intellect, and that he was regarded as one of the most capable hadith masters (ḥuffāẓ) of his age. Shortly before his death, when Zayn al-Dīn al-ʿIrāqī was asked which hadith masters he was leaving behind, he listed in order: Ibn Ḥajar, Ibn al-ʿIrāqī, and Nūr al-Dīn al-Haythami. In this, one discerns a clear indication of Ibn al-ʿIrāqī's full scholarly ripeness and his preeminent expertise in the science of ḥadīth. Ibn Ḥajar al-ʿAsqalānī remarked that Ibn al-ʿIrāqī was known for his uncompromising stance in defending the truth and for his amiable nature that allowed him to get along with everyone. Ibn Taghrībirdī highlighted his modest and pleasant personality.

== Works ==
His list of works include:

=== Hadith ===
1. Al-Mustefād min mubhamāti'l-matn wa'l-isnād ("What Is Gained from Clarifying the Ambiguities of Texts and Chains of Transmission") — A multi-volume work dedicated to identifying anonymous narrators in Hadith chains and texts. It is considered the most comprehensive and systematic work on this specialized field, known as Mubhamāt al-Isnād, a sub-genre of Ilm al-Rijal (the science of narrators).
2. Ṭarḥ al-tasrīb fī sharḥ al-Taqrīb ("Casting Light in the Commentary on al-Taqrīb") — A multi-volume legal commentary and analysis of the foundational Hadith collection Taqrīb al-Asānīd authored by his father, Zain al-Din al-'Iraqi. His son, Wali al-Din al-'Iraqi, wrote a commentary that provides detailed explanations of both the chains of narration (isnād) and the derived legal rulings (fiqh al-hadith) for thousands of hadiths.
3. Al-Aṭrāf (al-Iṭrāf) bi-awhām al-Aṭrāf("Identification of the Errors Found in the Works of Aṭrāf") — Written to correct errors found in Jamal al-Din al-Mizzi's Tuḥfat al-ashrāf bi-maʿrifat al-aṭrāf.
4. Al-Bayān wa'l tawḍīḥ li-man Ukhrija Lahu fī al-Ṣaḥīḥ wa-mu'issa bi-arb min al-jarḥ ("Explanation and Clarification of Those Narrators Included in the Ṣaḥīḥ Collections Who Were Subject to Some Degree of Criticism") — A study of transmitters whose narrations appear in al-Bukhārī and Muslim but who were nonetheless criticized by some scholars. The author presents the statements of the critics first, then those who defended the narrators.
5. Dhail ʿalā al-ʿIbar fī Khabar man Ghabar ("Supplement to “al-ʿIbar” Regarding the Reports of Past Generations") — Al-Dhahabi wrote al-ʿIbar and a supplement to it; Zayn al-Dīn al-ʿIrāqī wrote a supplement covering the years 741–763 AH (1340–1362). Ibn al-ʿIrāqī continued this work with his own supplement beginning from his birth year, 762 AH (1361), to the year 786 AH (1384).
6. Dhail al-Kāshif ("Supplement to al-Kāshif") — A compilation of narrators found in al-Mizzī's Tahdhīb al-Kamāl and Ibn Ḥajar's Tahdhīb al-Tahdhīb whom al-Dhahabī omitted from al-Kāshif, as well as narrators appearing in Ahmad ibn Hanbal's Musnad but missing from the earlier works. The book includes 2,198 individuals. Edited by Būrān al-Dannāwī (Beirut 1406/1986). Ibn Ḥajar pointed out needed corrections in Taʿjīl al-manfa'a and continued them in al-Jawāb al-jalīl.
7. Sharḥ Sunan Abī Dāwūd ("Commentary on Sunan Abū Dāwūd") — One of the author's early works, a seven-volume commentary reaching up to the chapter “Prostration of Forgetfulness.” Two incomplete manuscripts survive in Süleymaniye Library; these likely represent this unfinished commentary.
8. Amālī fī al-ḥadīth ("Hadith Dictations") — Al-Kattānī states the work consists of around 600 sessions. One manuscript is at Köprülü Library. Other copies are listed in Brockelmann.
9. Al-Aḥādīth al-ʿushāriyyāt ("The Tens-Grouped Hadith Collection") — A collection of forty hadiths dictated by Ibn al-ʿIrāqī. A manuscript is preserved at the Köprülü Library.
10. Tuḥfat al-taḥṣīl fī dhikr ruwāt al-marāsīl ("The Gift of Attainment Concerning the Narrators of Mursal Reports")
11. Kitāb al-(Akhbār) al-mudallisin ("The Book of the (Reports on) Mudallis Narrators") — Here the author adds thirteen more “obfuscating” transmitters (mudallisīn) to the list cited by Salāh al-Dīn al-ʿAlāʾī in Jāmiʿ al-taḥṣīl. Ibn Ḥajar completed this topic in Ṭabaqāt al-mudallisin. A copy exists in the Köprülü Library.

=== Fiqh ===
1. Muqaddima bi'l-ḥukm bi'l-mūjib wa'l-ḥukm bi'l-ṣiḥḥa ("An Introduction on Binding Rulings and Validity Rulings") — A work on fatwa methodology; manuscripts are preserved in Süleymaniye Library. Others are cited in Brockelmann.
2. Taḥrīr al-fatāwī ʿalā al-Tanbīh wa’l-Minhāj wa’l-Ḥāwī ("Refinement of Legal Verdicts Based on al-Tanbīh, al-Minhāj, and al-Ḥāwī") — An evaluative compilation of works written on three foundational Shāfiʿī texts.
3. Al-Ajwiba al-marḍiyya ʿan al-asʾila al-Makkiyya ("Satisfactory Answers to the Meccan Questions") — Composed in 809 AH (1406) in response to thirty questions posed by Taqiyy al-Dīn Ibn Fahd al-Makkī.
4. Tanqīḥ al-Lubāb ("The Clarification of al-Lubāb") — An abridgement of Ibn al-Mahāmilī's al-Lubāb fi'l-fiqh.
5. Mukhtaṣar al-Muhimāt ("A Concise Abridgment of al-Muhimāt") — An abridgement of al-Isnawī's al-Muhimāt ʿalā al-Rawḍa. A manuscript is at Dār al-Kutub al-Miṣriyya.
6. Sharḥ Manẓūma fī al-wuḍūʾ al-mustahabb ("Commentary on a Poem Concerning Recommended Forms of Wuḍū") — A commentary on Zayn al-Dīn al-ʿIrāqī's poem listing forty recommended occasions for performing wuḍū.
7. Al-Nehja (al-Bahja) al-marḍiyya sharḥ al-Bahja al-wardiyya ("The Pleasing Path (or: The Satisfying Delight), a Commentary on al-Bahja al-Wardiyya") — A commentary on the versification of al-Ḥāwī al-ṣaghīr by ʿAbd al-Ghaffār al-Qazwīnī.
8. Al-Ghays al-hāmiʿ sharḥ Sharḥ Jamʿ al-jawāmiʿ ("The Pouring Rain: A Commentary on the Commentary of Jam' al-Jawami'") — An abridgement of al-Zarkashi's commentary on Jam' al-Jawami' by Tāj al-Dīn al-Subkī. A manuscript is found in Süleymaniye.
9. Sharḥ al-Najm al-wahhāj fī naẓm al-Minhāj ("Commentary on al-Najm al-Wahhāj, the Poetic Versification of al-Minhāj") — Zayn al-Dīn al-ʿIrāqī had extracted the hadiths of al-Bayḍāwī's legal theory work Minhāj al-wuṣūl and versified it in 1,367 lines (Naẓm Minhāj al-wuṣūl). Ibn al-ʿIrāqī wrote this commentary on the poem in 788 AH (1386). A manuscript is held in the Iranian Majlis Library.

=== Other ===
1. Alfiyya fī tafsīr gharīb alfāẓ al-Qurʾān ("A Thousand-Verse Poem on Explaining the Rare and Unfamiliar Vocabulary of the Qurʾān") —
2. Sharḥ al-ṣadr bi-dhikr laylat al-qadr ("Opening the Chest by Recalling Laylat al-Qadr")
3. Sharḥ al-urjūza al-Yāsamīniyya ("Commentary on the Yāsamīnī Poem (Urjūza)")
4. Uns al-wāḥid
5. Al-Inṣāf

== See also ==
- List of Ash'aris
