= Ibn al-Mulaqqin =

14th-century Islamic scholar

Imam Ibn al-Muláqqin
- ابن الملقن
- Title: Shaykh al-Islām; Siraj al-Din; Al-Ḥāfiẓ

Personal life
- Born: 1323 Cairo
- Died: 1401 (aged 77–78) Cairo
- Era: Mamluk period
- Region: Egypt
- Main interest(s): Hadith sciences, Islamic jurisprudence, Biography, Islamic theology
- Notable work(s): Al-Tawdhih
- Occupation: Scholar, Jurist, Traditionist, Theologian, Historian, Linguist

Religious life
- Religion: Islam
- Denomination: Sunni
- Jurisprudence: Shafi'i
- Creed: Ash'ari

Muslim leader
- Influenced by: Al-Shafi'i Abu Hasan al-Ash'ari Izz al-Din ibn 'Abd al-Salam Al-Nawawi Taqi al-Din al-Subki Jamal al-Din al-Isnawi Salah al-Din al-Ala'i Abu Hayyan al-Gharnati Ibn Hisham al-Ansari
- Influenced: Wali al-Din al-'Iraqi Ibn Hajar Al-Asqalani Jalal ad-Din al-Mahalli Taqi al-Din al-Fasi Al-Damiri Al-Maqrizi Al-Suyuti

Sirāj al-Dīn Abū Ḥafṣ ʿUmar b. ʿAlī b. Aḥmad al-Shāfiʿī al-Miṣrī (Arabic: سراج الدين أبو حفص عمر بن علي بن أحمد الشافعي المصري), commonly known as Ibn al-Muláqqin (Arabic: ابن الملقن; 723-804 AH/ 1323–1401 CE), was a Sunni Egyptian scholar. He is considered one of the greatest Shafi'i jurisconsult and hadith scholar of his time. He gained renown for his voluminous scholarship on hadith and Islamic jurisprudence, while also distinguishing himself as a theologian, historian, and linguist. His remarkable productivity made him the most prolific scholar of his era, with writings spanning numerous disciplines.

== Family origin ==
Ibn al-Muláqqin's father, Nur al-Din Ali (d. 724/1324), was an Andalusian scholar from the village of Wadi Ash (Guadix) in the province of Granada, celebrated for his expertise in Arabic grammar (nahw). He later relocated to West Africa (Bilad al-Takrur), where he taught the Quran until he had accumulated enough income to immigrate to Cairo. Ibn al-Muláqqin belonged to the lineage of the Ansar from Medina who settled in al-Andalus after the conquest.

== Early life ==
=== Birth ===
He was born 723 A.H., which corresponds to the year 1323 C.E in Cairo. A year later his father died and his mother married a close friend of her late husband named ʿĪsā al-Maghribī, who taught the Qur'an (mulaqqin) at the Ibn Tulun Mosque. It was through this stepfather that he came to be known as Ibn al-Muláqqin. However, he personally preferred the name Ibn al-Nahwi, in tribute to his father, and disliked being referred to as Ibn al-Muláqqin.

=== Education ===
Ibn al-Muláqqin completed his Qur'anic recitation and memorization under his stepfather, studied Maliki jurisprudence, and memorized Abd al-Ghani al-Maqdisi's Umdat al-Ahkam. Later, under the instruction of Izz al-Din Ibn Jama'a, he shifted to the Shafi'i school and memorized al-Nawawi's Minhaj al-Talibin. He studied Arabic, jurisprudence, and Qur'anic recitation with notable scholars in Cairo. He himself states that he listened to 1,000 sections of hadith. He travelled to Cairo, Alexandria, Aleppo, Damascus, Jerusalem, Hejaz (Mecca & Medina) and Yemen studying under numerous scholars.

=== Teachers ===
He studied under the prominent scholars of his time:

- Taqi al-Din al-Subki
- Jamal al-Din al-Isnawi
- Salah al-Din al-Ala'i
- Izz al-Din Ibn Jama'a
- Abu Hayyan al-Gharnati
- Ibn Hisham al-Ansari

== Scholarly life ==
=== Career ===
Ibn al-Muláqqin earned his livelihood as a professional scholar, though the specifics of his official appointments remain somewhat unclear. He served as a Shafi'i judge (qadi) in Egypt’s eastern district (al-Sharqiyya) and as a deputy (na'ib) to the chief Shafi'i judge in Cairo. He also taught Shafi'i jurisprudence at the mausoleum of al-Salih, the Ayyubid ruler of Egypt from 637/1240 to 647/1249, held several preaching posts including one at the al-Hakim mosque, and briefly worked at the Dar al-Hadith in the Kamiliyya madrasa. However, the pinnacle of his career—the chief Shafi'i judgeship of Egypt—remained out of reach. His attempts to secure this position through his friendship with the future Sultan Barquq led to serious difficulties when rival scholars conspired against him, culminating in his brief imprisonment in the autumn of 780/1378.

=== Students ===
He produced numerous scholars and some of his famous students include:

- Wali al-Din al-'Iraqi
- Ibn Hajar Al-Asqalani
- Jalal ad-Din al-Mahalli
- Ibn Nasir al-Din
- Taqi al-Din al-Fasi
- Al-Damiri
- Ibn al-'Ajmi
- Al-Maqrizi

== Downfall and death ==
Ibn al-Muláqqin had a passion for writing and absolutely loved books. By the end of his life, he wrote and accumulated a huge collection but lost them due to a fire breaking out which severely broke him down mentally and leaving him despondent and isolated. Ibn Hajar wrote that “Ibn Muláqqin was of sound mind before his books burned, but afterwards his son had to hide him.” He died on a Friday evening on the 15th of October in the year of 1401. He was buried in the Sufi cemetery near his father outside of the Bab al-Nasr, in Cairo.

== Mysticism ==
Ibn al-Muláqqin was a practising Sufi who transmitted the khirqa (a cloak placed on the head from master to disciple which indicates a spiritual lineage of Sufi tradition) and Ibn al-Muláqqin claimed to have met the famous immortal saint called Al-Khadir on two occasions.

== Controversy over Ibn al-Mulaqqin ==
Although Ibn al-Muláqqin was widely respected for his personal character and for producing numerous commentaries and abridgements of legal and hadith works that were considered accessible and well-structured, his prolific output drew significant criticism as well. Some scholars argued that the sheer volume of his writings compromised their quality. The Syrian chronicler Ibn Hijji (d. 816/1413) went so far as to accuse him of careless scholarship and even plagiarism, while other Syrian scholars dismissed him as “a copyist prone to frequent mistakes.” Although such allegations were shut down by many major scholars of his time and those that came after him had defended his honour.

== Legacy ==
Ibn al-Muláqqin's prodigious literary output earned him the distinction of being regarded as "one of the three marvels of his age." In this esteemed trio, Sirāj al-Dīn al-Bulqīnī (d. 805/1403) was celebrated as the greatest Shafi'i jurist, Zayn al-Dīn al-‘Irāqī (d. 806/1404) as the greatest hadith scholar, and Ibn al-Mulaqqin as the most prolific author.

His teacher Salāh al-Dīn al-ʿAlāʾī said:

“He was the Shaykh al-Islām, most knowledgeable of the scholars, honour of the Fuqahāʾ and the Muhaddithīn and pride of the virtuous. He excelled in Fiqh and Hadīth.”

== Works ==
Ibn al-Muláqqin stated that God had granted him a deep and sincere love for the legal sciences, particularly the science of Hadith, to which he devoted the majority of his scholarly efforts. This passion for learning is reflected in his extraordinary literary output. He is reported to have authored around three hundred distinct works, although the majority of them have not survived. His notable works include:

=== Hadith ===
- Al-Tawdhih li-Sharh al-Jami' al-Sahih — It is regarded as the largest and most detailed commentary on Sahih Bukhari.
- Al-Badr al-Munir fi Takhrij Ahadith al-Sharh al-Kabir — Focuses on the hadith in Abu al-Qasim al-Rafi'i's commentary on al-Ghazali's al-Wajiz. It is in 28 volumes.
- Al-I'lam bi Fawa'id Umdat al-Ahkam — It is considered one of the best and largest commentary on Umdat al-Ahkam by Abd al-Ghani al-Maqdisi.
- Ikmalu Tahdhib al-Kamal — Continuation of al-Mizzi's work Tahthib Al-Kamal fi Asma' Al-rijal. Ibn al-Muláqqin expands the work by supplementing narrators from Musnad Ahmad, Sahih Ibn Khuzaymah, Sahih Ibn Hibban, Sunan al-Daraqutni, Sunan al-Kubra by al-Bayhaqi, and al-Hakim's Mustadrak.
- Mukhtasar al-Istidraki al-Hafiz al-Zahabi 'ala Mustadrak Abi Abd Allah al-Hakim — A summarized version of al-Dhahabi's work on al-Hakim's al-Mustadrak, called al-Nukat al-Litaf fi Bayani Ahadithi al-Di'af. Edited by Abdullah Hamed al-Lahidhan and Sa'd b. Abdullah b. Abdulqadir.
- Tuhfat al-Muhtaj ila Edillat'l-Minhaj — Focuses on hadiths supporting the fiqh of al-Nawawi's Minhaj al-Talibin.
- Izah al-Irtiyab fi Ma'rifat ma Yashtabihu wa Yatasahhaf min al-Asma' wa'l-Ansab wa'l-Alfaz wa'l-Kuna wa'l-Alqab al-Waqi'a fi Tuhfat al-Muhtaj ila Edillati'l-Minhaj
- Al-Bulgha fi Ahadith al-Ahkam mimma Ttiffaqa ‘Alayhi al-Shaykhan — Extracted from Tuhfat al-Muhtaj, containing 475 hadiths agreed upon by al-Bukhari and Muslim.
- Tadhkirat al-Muhtaj ila Ahadith al-Minhaj — On the hadith in al-Baydawi's Minhaj al-Wusul.
- Al-Muqni' fi Ulum al-Hadith — A summary and reworking of Ibn al-Salah's Ulum al-Hadith, published as a master's thesis in Mecca (1983) and later by Abdullah Yusuf al-Jadi.
- Al-Tadhkirah fi Ulum al-Hadith — A condensed version of the previous work. Shams al-Din al-Suhawi wrote a commentary on it titled al-Tawzih al-Abhar ‘ala Tadhkirat Ibn al-Mulaqqin fi ‘Ilm al-Athar.
- Tadhkirat al-Akhyar bima fi'l-Wasit — On hadiths in al-Ghazali's al-Wasit.
- Ghayat al-Ma'muli al-Raghib fi Ma'rifat Ahadith Ibn al-Hajib — Focuses on hadiths in Ibn al-Hajib's al-Mukhtasar on principles of jurisprudence.
- Injaz al-Wa'di al-Wafi fi Sharh Jami' al-Tirmidhi — The manuscript covering the initial sections (153 leaves) is in Chester Beatty Library. Likely a commentary on Sunan al-Tirmidhi, including the additional hadiths not found in the collections of Bukhari, Muslim, and Abu Dawud.
- Ma Tamassu ilayhi al-Hajji 'ala Sunan Ibn Majah — Commentary on the additional hadiths of Ibn Majah relative to the other five works of the Kutub al-Sitta.
- Sharh Zawa’id Muslim ‘ala al-Bukhari

=== Fiqh ===
- Umdat al-Muhtaj ila Sharh al-Minhaj — A major commentary on al-Nawawi's Minhaj al-Talibin. Various manuscript copies exist (Chester Beatty Library, nos. 3361, 3366, 3382, 3946, 4687; copy in Kuwait Manuscript Institute, no. 1841). Published in sixteen volumes (Beirut 1439/2018).
- Ujalat al-Muhtaj ila Tawjih al-Minhaj — A smaller commentary on the same work above.
- Al-Isharat ila ma Waqa'a fi'l-Minhaj min al-Asma' wa'l-Amakin wa'l-Lughat — Published in three volumes after verification by Hiba Rufi Iwaz, Rabi' Muhammad Iwazullah, Ahmed Uways Junaydi, and Wiam al-Hushi.
- Al-Tadhkirah fi'l-Fiqh al-Shafi'i
- Al-Ashbah wa'l-Nazair fi'l-Fiqh
- Khulasat al-Fatawa fi Tashil Asrari al-Hawi — Commentary on Abu al-Qasim al-Rafi'i's al-Hawi al-Saghir.
- Ghunyat al-Faqih fi Sharh al-Tanbih — Commentary on Abu Ishaq al-Shirazi's work al-Tanbih.
- Al-Kalam 'ala Sunan al-Jum‘a Qablaha wa Ba'daha

=== Biography ===
- Al-'Iqd al-Mudhahhab fi Tabaqat Hamalati al-Madhhab — Biographies of about 1,200 Shafi'i scholars, divided into three levels. Published by Ayman Nasr al-Azhari and Sayyid Muhanna.
- Tabaqat al-Awliya — Also known as Tabaqat al-Sufiyya, covering 230 biographies of over 300 Sufis.
- Nuzhat al-Nuzzar fi Qudat al-Usar
- Durar al-Jawahir fi Manaqib al-Shaykh Abd al-Qadir

=== Other ===
- Tafsir Gharib al-Qur'an — Alphabetically arranged, based on his teacher Abu Hayyan al-Gharnati's Tuhfat al-Arib.
- Ghayat al-Sul fi Khasais al-Rasul
- Hada’iq al-Haqa'iq— Also, known as Hada'iq al-Awliya'

== See also ==
- List of Ash'aris
