= Alfiyya of al-Iraqi =

Al-Tabsira wa'l-Tadhkira fī ʿUlūm al-Ḥadīth (Arabic: التبصرة والتذكرة في علوم الحديث, lit. 'The Insight and the Remembrance in the Sciences of Hadith'), commonly known as Alfiyya al-Hadith (Arabic: ألفيّة الحديث, lit. 'The Thousand-Verse Poem on Hadith') or just Alfiyya al-Iraqi (Arabic: الألفية العراقية) is a didactic poem of approximately 1002 rajaz verses and serves as a comprehensive guide to hadith terminology and methodology, composed by the Shāfiʿī hadith expert Zain al-Din al-Iraqi (725–806 AH / 1325–1404 CE). The work is a poetic summary of Ibn al-Salah's Muqaddimah, preserving the structure and major discussions of Ibn al-Ṣalāḥ's treatise while presenting them in a highly memorizable verse form. Widely studied across the Muslim world, the Alfiyya became a standard pedagogical text for students of hadith methodology.

== Composition ==
Al-ʿIrāqī summarized Ibn al-Ṣalāḥ's work in 1002 verses to facilitate the memorization of the principles of ḥadīth science. He completed this work in Medina in Jumādā al-Ākhirah 768 (February 1367) and titled it Tabsirat al-Mubtadī wa Tadhkirat al-Muntahī (commonly known as al-Tabsira wa’l-Tadhkira) or simply by its poetic form as Alfiyyah al-Hadith or Alfiyyah al-Iraqi.

The purpose of composing the Alfiyya was to benefit all those engaged in the study of the Sunnah and its sciences, foremost among them beginning students of knowledge, so that the Alfiyyah would serve as a comprehensive guide and general introduction to the principles and issues of ḥadīth terminology. He expressed this aim in his verses, saying:

"I have composed it as an introduction

Mentioning the chains of transmission and texts,

As a general insight for the beginner in this field."

== Content and methodology ==
The Alfiyya serves primarily as a metrical summary of Ibn al-Ṣalāḥ Muqaddima, one of the most influential manuals in the field. Al-ʿIrāqī identifies the Muqaddima as the basis of his poem and states in his commentary that the Alfiyya distills Ibn al-Ṣalāḥ's discussions, categories, and legal-theoretical issues into concise verses. His abridgement does not attempt to reproduce Ibn al-Ṣalāḥ's numerous examples, detailed argumentations, or chains of attribution behind each scholarly opinion; instead, it focuses on the essential concepts and classifications.

Although fundamentally an abridgment, the Alfiyya contains many additions not found in Ibn al-Ṣalāḥ's work. Al-ʿIrāqī indicates that he expanded several discussions and incorporated material from other important sources. These additions draw on works he explicitly cites within the poem, sometimes naming both the author and the book, sometimes naming only one of them for brevity, and at times referring to them in a general, collective manner. He also clarifies in his commentary that these additions were selected from a range of authoritative texts in the field.

Al-ʿIrāqī's approach in the Alfiyya follows the dominant tradition of the eighth Islamic century: organizing the dispersed discussions of earlier scholars into a systematic, versified manual. The poem emphasizes clarity, ordering of categories, and ease of memorization, which explains both the selective brevity within the verses and the fuller analytical treatment in his commentary. By combining an abridgment of a foundational text with carefully chosen expansions from other major authorities, al-ʿIrāqī produced a work that functioned both as an introduction for students and a reference point for the advanced.

== Commentaries ==
The Alfiyya, which gained immense popularity among students of ḥadīth, was commented upon by numerous scholars, including its author himself. The principal commentaries are as follows:

1. Fatḥ al-Mughīth bi-Sharḥ Alfiyyat al-Ḥadīth by Zain al-Din al-Iraqi. He began a comprehensive commentary on his Alfiyya but later abandoned this larger project in favour of a more concise version, which he completed on 25 Ramaḍān 771 (22 April 1370).
2. Fatḥ al-Mughīth by al-Sakhawi. Kâtip Çelebi describes this multi-volume work as the most excellent of all commentaries on the Alfiyya.
3. Al-Nukat al-Wafiyya by Burhan al-Din al-Biqa'i
4. Fatḥ al-Bāqī ʿalā Alfiyyat al-ʿIrāqī by Zakariyya al-Ansari
5. Sharḥ Alfiyyat al-ʿIrāqī by Ibn Raslan.
6. Sharḥ Alfiyyat al-ʿIrāqī by Amir Padishah
7. Sharḥ Alfiyyat al-ʿIrāqī by al-Munawi
8. Sharḥ Alfiyyat al-ʿIrāqī by ʿAlī ibn Muḥammad al-Ujhūrī

== See also ==
- List of Sunni books
