= Musnad =

Musnad may refer to:

- Ancient South Arabian script (used for several Old South Arabian and Eritrean languages)
- Musnad hadith – a hadith whose traceable transmission is uninterrupted
- Musnads – collections of hadith arranged by the narrator's name, such as Musnad Ahmad ibn Hanbal
