= Majma al-Zawa'id =

Sunni hadith collection by Ali ibn Abu Bakr al-Haythami

Majmu' al-Zawa'id wa Manba' al-Fawa'id
- Author: Ali ibn Abu Bakr al-Haythami
- Language: Arabic
- Subject: hadith

Majmu' al-Zawa'id wa Manba' al-Fawa'id (Arabic: مجمع الزوائد ومنبع الفوائد) is a secondary Sunni hadith collection written by Ali ibn Abu Bakr al-Haythami (1335–1404 CE/735–807 AH). It compiles the 'unique' hadith of earlier primary collections.

== Description ==
=== Al-Zawa'id ===
As the Centuries passed, some authors began to compile secondary collections of hadith . One method of composition of these works was al-zawa'id, the extraction of any 'unique' hadith found in one collection but not in another. Most commonly, the hadith of one collection would be extracted that were not found in six canonical hadith collections.

=== Majma al-Zawa'id ===
Majma al-Zawa'id is a prominent example of the al-zawa'id methodology of hadith compilation. It contains 18,776 hadiths extracted from Musnad of Ahmad ibn Hanbal, the Musnad by Abu Ya'la al-Mawsili, the Musnad of Abu Bakr al-Bazzar, and three of al-Tabarani's collections: Al-Mu'jam al-Kabir, Al-Mu'jam Al-Awsat and Al-Mu'jam As-Saghir. The hadith gathered by al-Haythami are those not found in the six canonical hadith collections: Sahih Bukhari, Sahih Muslim, Sunan al-Sughra, Sunan Abu Dawood, Sunan al-Tirmidhi and Sunan Ibn Majah.”

It is considered secondary because it was collected from previous hadith collections. In spite of the fact that its source books are primarily arranged as musnads, Majma' al-Zawa'id is arranged in the manner of a sunan collection – by topical chapter titles relating to jurisprudence. The author provides commentary on the authenticity of each hadith and evaluates some of the narrators. He is, however, considered to have been somewhat lenient in his rulings upon the hadith he graded.

== Praise ==
Al-Kattani described al-Majma al-Zawa'id as being "from the most beneficial books of hadith, or rather, there is no book comparable to it and an equivalent has yet to be authored."

== Origins ==
Majma al-Zawa'id combines several earlier works of the author. Those works are:

1. Ghayah al-Maqsad fi Zawa'id al-Musnad: the zawa'id of Musnad Ahmad, a subject suggested to him by his teacher, Abd al-Rahim ibn al-Husain al-'Iraqi;
2. Al-Bahr al-Zakhkhar fi Zawa'id Musnad al-Bazzar: the zawa'id of the Musnad of al-Bazzar;
3. The zawa'id of the Musnad of Abu Ya'la al-Mawsili;
4. Al-Badr al-Munir fi Zawa'id al-Mu'jam al-Kabeer: the zawa'id of al-Tabarani's Al-Mu'jam al-Kabir;
5. Majma al-Bahrain fi Zawa'id al-Mu'jamain: the zawa'id of al-Tabarani's al-Mu'jam al-Awsat and al-Mu'jam al-Saghir.

== Published editions ==
- Printed in Cairo 1352–1353 AH/1933-1934 CE.
- Printed by Mu'assash al-Ma'arif in Beirut in 1986 in a total of 10 sections in 5 volumes – 2 sections per volume. It includes the editing of al-'Iraqi and Ibn Hajar al-Asqalani.
