= Introduction to the Science of Hadith =

1236 book by Ibn al-Ṣalāḥ

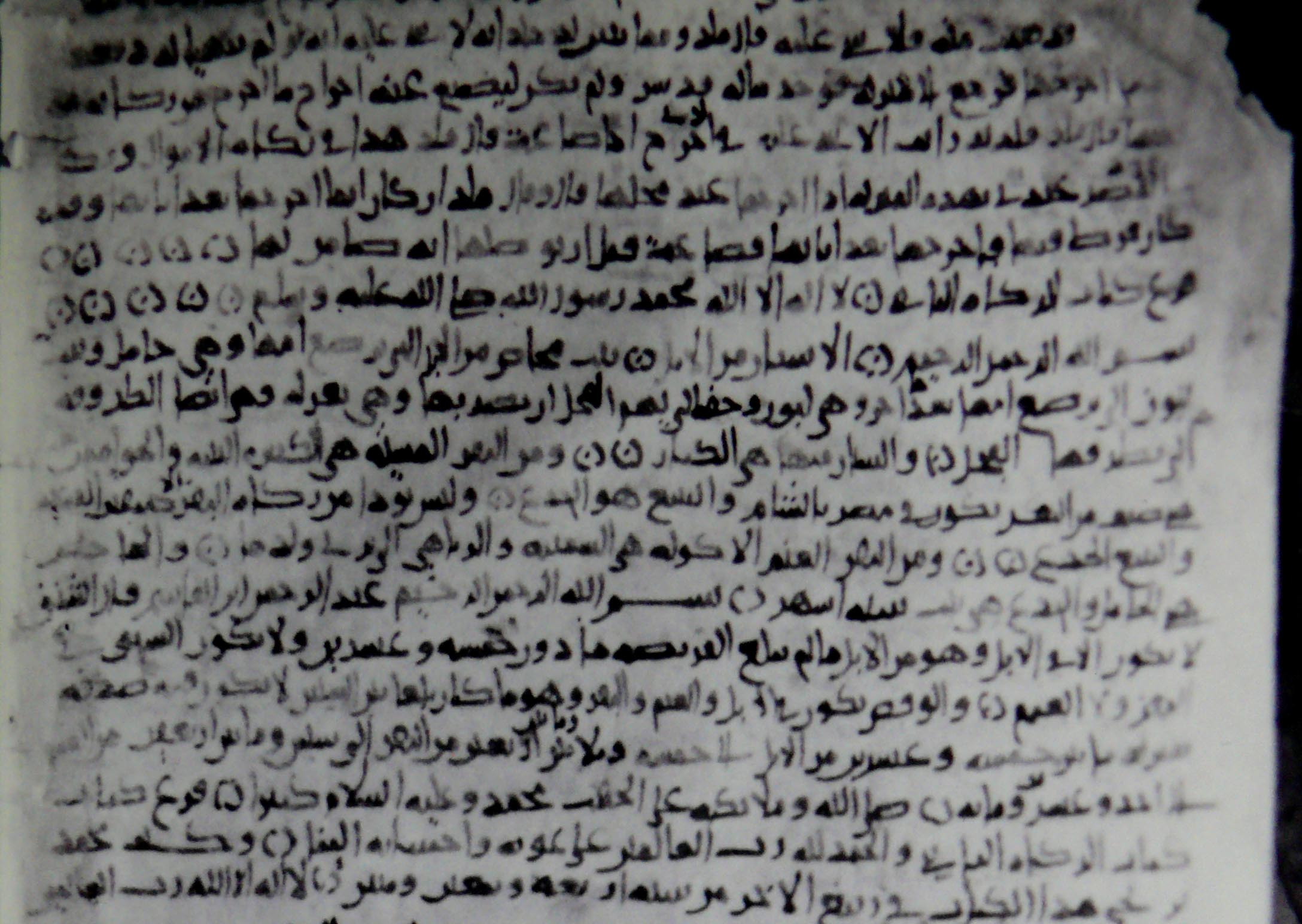
- Sample of older Arabic text
- Author: Ibn al-Ṣalāḥ
- Original title: Muqaddimah ibn al-Ṣalāḥ
- Translator: Dr. Eerik Dickinson
- Language: Arabic
- Series: Great Books of Islamic Civilization
- Subject: Science of hadith, hadith terminology and biographical evaluation
- Publisher: Garnet Publishing Limited
- Publication date: 577 AH (1181/1182 CE)
- Publication place: Syria
- English publication date: 2010
- Pages: 356
- ISBN: 1-85964-158-X

(Ibn al-Ṣalāḥ's) Introduction to the Science of Hadith (Arabic: مقدمة ابن الصلاح في علوم الحديث, romanized: Muqaddimah ibn al-Ṣalāḥ fī ‘Ulūm al-Ḥadīth) is a 13th-century book written by `Abd al-Raḥmān ibn `Uthmān al-Shahrazūrī, better known as Ibn al-Ṣalāḥ, which describes the Islamic discipline of the science of hadith, its terminology and the principles of biographical evaluation. A hadith is a recorded statement, action or approval of the Islamic prophet Muhammad which serves as the second source of legislature in Islamic law. The science of hadith that this work describes contains the principles with which a hadith specialist evaluates the authenticity of individual narrations.

The Introduction comprises 65 chapters, each covering a hadith related issue. The first 33 chapters describe the various technical terms of hadith terminology which describe the conditions of a hadith's authenticity, or acceptability as a basis for Islamic jurisprudence. The following chapters relate to the isnād, or chain of narration. Next are a series of chapters pertaining to the etiquette to be observed by hadith scholars and manners of transcription. The last chapters describe various issues relating to the narrators of hadith including naming conventions.

Ibn al-Ṣalāḥ began the Introduction as a series of lectures he dictated to his students in Damascus ending in 1233. It has received considerable attention from subsequent authors who explained, abridged and set it to poetry and it became an example for latter books of its genre. The Introduction has been published a number of times in its original Arabic and has also been translated into English.

== Title ==
As the Introduction was not officially named by the author, there exists some speculation as to its actual title, with different possibilities suggested. al-Dhahabī referred to it as `Ulūm al-Ḥadīth, The Sciences of Hadith, as did Ibn Ḥajr and Muḥammad ibn Ja`far al-Kattānī.

`Āʼishah bint `Abd al-Raḥmān said in the foreword of her edition of the Introduction:

His book about the sciences of hadith is the best known of his works without comparison, to the extent that it is sufficient to say, the Book of Ibn al-Ṣalāḥ, the intent being understood due to its popularity and stature. With the previous scholars, its subject matter overcame it, thus being referred to as, the Book of Ibn al-Ṣalāḥ about `Ulūm al-Ḥadīth or as he referred to it in its opening pages, the Book of Familiarity with the Types of `Ulūm al-Ḥadīth. It has become well known as of late as: Muqaddimah Ibn al-Ṣalāḥ fi `Ulūm al-Ḥadīth, Ibn al-Ṣalāḥ's Introduction to the Sciences of Hadith.

Nūr al-Dīn `Itr, in the introduction to his edition of the Introduction, concluded that its actual name is either ʻUlūm al-Ḥadīth (The Sciences of Hadith) or Ma`rifah Anwā`i `Ilm al-Ḥadīth (Familiarity with the Types of the Science of Hadith). This is based upon the author's own usage in his own introduction in addition to the usage of other scholars in the centuries after the authoring of the book. Similar to Bint `Abd al-Raḥmān, he acknowledged that the book is most commonly referred to as Muqaddimah Ibn al-Ṣalāḥ (The Introduction of Ibn al-Ṣalāḥ).

== Overview ==
al-`Irāqī described the Introduction as "the best book authored by a hadith specialist in defining its terminology."

=== Origin ===
Books of hadith terminology passed through two developmental phases. The first was the compilation of the statements of earlier scholars, quoting the expressions they had used without evaluating those terms or suggesting terms applicable to those expressions. This was the methodology adopted by earlier scholars such as Yaḥyā ibn Ma`īn, `Alī ibn al-Madīnī, Muslim ibn al-Ḥajjāj, al-Tirmidhī in their works. The second phase consisted of books based upon and evaluating those of the first phase. Their authors cited the quoted statements of the earlier works and began the arrangement and codification of relevant terms. Principles were established and, for the most part, accepted, with individualized terms exclusive to particular scholars explained in context. Examples of books authored in this manner are: Ma`rifah `Ulūm al-Ḥadīth by al-Ḥākim, Al-Kifāyah by al-Khaṭīb al-Baghdādī and the Introduction of Ibn al-Ṣalāḥ.

The Introduction finds its origins in the books of al-Khaṭīb al-Baghdādī, who authored numerous books on the various disciplines of the science of hadith, upon which all latter scholars in the discipline were indebted. In particular, he focused on al-Khaṭīb's al-Kifāyah as he viewed it as comprehensive of the various disciplines of the science of hadith.

The book began as a series of lectures Ibn al-Ṣalāḥ delivered at the Ashrafiyyah School in Damascus. In these lectures he dictated its contents piecemeal to his students. He began delivering the lectures on Friday, June 17, 1233 CE/630 AH, his first lecture delivered in that school, and completed them at the end of September or the beginning of October of the year 1236/634. The Introduction was either transcribed or memorized by those students in attendance.

It was in a similar manner that the Introduction was disseminated. Al-Dhahabī named a number of scholars who conveyed it directly from Ibn al-Ṣalāḥ, the majority of whom then authorized al-Dhahabī to do so as well. Similarly, al-`Irāqī mentioned two scholars who conveyed it to him from Muḥammad ibn Yūsuf al-Muḥtar, a student of Ibn al-Ṣalāḥ, as did Ibn Ḥajr, who mentioned his isnād (chain of narration) to it, also having conveyed it from two of his own teachers.

=== Arrangement ===
While Ibn al-Ṣalāḥ arranged his work to a greater extent than previous authors on the subject, it had its limitations in organization because it began as a series of lectures. He did not arrange his book in a particular manner, in some cases mentioning a term related to the matn (text), before moving onto one related to the isnād (chain of narration), or perhaps mentioning types related to both. As a large number of students were present at his lectures, memorizing or transcribing them, he was subsequently unable to revise this order. Were he to have done so, the students original transcriptions might then differ with his revisions as some may have attended the original lectures and others the revised. The introduction of the book required an index to guide readers which illustrates the somewhat disorganized nature of his work.

Ibn al-Ṣalāḥ, in his Introduction, codified the terminology established by those scholars before him based upon his reading of their works. He did so by citing some of those scholarly statements in the earlier works and deducing from them common terms and definitions in the manner of a scholar authoring a book of fiqh (jurisprudence). In this manner, his book was based upon those principles established by the earlier hadith specialists combined with some elements of fiqh. An example of this would be the inclusion of the division of hadith into mutawātir and āḥād. He therefore only mentioned the statements of the earlier scholars as appropriate and mostly sufficed with conclusions drawn from them and then specifying or clarifying a definition.

The definitions Ibn al-Ṣalāḥ used to describe the individual terms of hadith terminology were largely in accordance with the views of the majority of hadith specialists. In some instances, he would mention an undisputed opinion, before mentioning one that was widely accepted and then describing the difference. He would generally precede his critique of differing opinions by saying: "I say". For the primary terms described, he mentioned an example to illustrate that definition. His goal in doing so was to clarify that term and not necessarily establish it. He also distinguished his book by responding to the positions of other scholars in a detailed manner.

=== Content ===
Ibn al-Ṣalāḥ mentioned in his introduction to the Introduction 65 chapters, each specific to a particular type or term of hadith terminology before saying that an even larger number was conceivable. He began by discussing ṣaḥīḥ (authentic) as the first category, and then ḥasan (good) as the second, ḍa`īf (weak) the third, musnad (supported) the fourth and so on.

Ibn Jamāʻah, in his abridgement, divided these terms into four different categories according to subject (and adding six terms in the process). The first pertains to the matn (text) of the hadith and its three divisions and 30 types. The three divisions are ṣaḥīḥ, ḥasan, and ḍa`īf. The thirty types include those mentioned in hadith terminology and others. The second deals with the isnād (chain of narration) and comprises 11 types. These types generally fall within the discipline of biographical evaluation. The third category includes six types: the qualifications necessary for conveying hadith, the manners in which they are transmitted, the transcription of hadith, and the etiquette of the narrator and of the student. The fourth category, which comprises 21 types, relates to the names of the narrators. This includes the definition of a ṣaḥābī (companion), a tābi`ī (follower), the time periods of narrators, names and paidonymics among others.

Later scholars included additional types of hadith in their own works, with some almost reaching 100.

== Impact ==
The Introduction became the basis for subsequent books in hadith terminology. A number of subsequent scholars followed Ibn al-Ṣalāḥ in the ordering of his book, including al-Nawawī, Ibn Kathīr, al-ʻIraqi, al-Bulqīnī, Ibn al-Jamā`ah, al-Tabrīzī, al-Ṭībī and al-Zirkashī. In many instances this influence was direct, with numerous scholars authoring books indicating its finer points, explaining and abridging it and converting its meanings to poetry which then, in turn, was explained as will be discussed below.

Some of the scholars who spoke highly of the Introduction are:

- Ibn Jamā`ah said: "The Imām, the Ḥāfiẓ, Taqiy al-Dīn Abū `Amr Ibn al-Ṣalāḥ has followed the example [of previous scholars] in his book in which he has comprehensively included various points of benefit and compiled has done so with precision in his fine work."
- Burhān al-Dīn al-Abnāsī said: "the best work [in its field], the most innovative, constructive and beneficial is ʻUlūm al-Ḥadīth].
- al-`Irāqī described it as "the best book authored by a hadith specialist in defining its terminology."
- Muḥammad ibn Aḥmad al-Fāsī described it as beneficial.
- Ibn Ḥajr said that because Ibn al-Ṣalāḥ "gathered in it what had been previously dispersed throughout other books, people focused upon it, following his methodology. The works are innumerable in which the Introduction has been set to verse, abridged, added to and subtracted from, disagreed with and supported." Muḥammad ibn Jaʻfar al-Kattānī quoted the above from Ibn Ḥajr.

=== Books based upon the Introduction ===
As alluded to previously, a number of works have been authored, based upon or otherwise derived from Introduction. Both the number of these derivative works and the stature of their authors are indicative of the prominence and significance of this work.

==== Nukat ====
Each of the following have authored a book of nukat (نكت), literally 'points of interest or benefit', of the Introduction:

1. al-`Irāqī in al-Taqyīd wa al-Īḍāḥ (التقييد والايضاح)
2. Al-Badr al-Zarkashī
3. Ibn Ḥajr in al-Ifṣāḥ (الافصاح)

==== Abridgements ====
Each of the following have authored an abridgement:

1. Ibn Jamā`ah in al-Manhal al-Rawī (المنهل الروي)
2. al-Nawawī in al-Irshād (الارشاد), which he then abridged in Taqrīb al-Irshād (تقريب الارشاد), which was explained a number of times by:
  1. al-`Irāqī
  2. al-Sakhkhāwī
  3. al-Suyūṭī
3. Ibn Kathīr in Al-Bā`ith al-Hathīth (الباعث الحثيث)

==== Poetry ====
The following have set Introduction to verse, adding some content in the process:

1. al-`Irāqī in his thousand verse poem, Al-Tabsira wa'l-Tadhkira fī ʿUlūm al-Ḥadīth (التبصرة والتذكرة في علوم الحديث), which, in turn, was explained by a number of scholars, including:
  1. al-`Irāqī himself in two explanations, one long and the other brief;
  2. al-Sakhkhāwī in Fatḥ al-Mughīth (فتح المغيث)
  3. al-Suyūtī in Qaṭr al-Durar (قطر الدرر)
  4. Quṭub al-Dīn al-Khaydarī in Su'ūd al-Marāqī (صعود المراقي)
  5. Zakariyyā al-Ansārī in Fatḥ al-Bāqī (فتح الباقي)
2. al-Suyūṭī in his thousand verse poem which was comparable to al-ʻIrāqī's with some additions.

== Editions ==
The numerous editions of the Introduction in its original Arabic include two of the more reliable:

- Muqaddimah Ibn al-Ṣalāḥ wa Muḥāsin al-Iṣṭilāḥ, edited ʻĀʼishah bint ʻAbd al-Raḥmān, Cairo: Dar al-Ma'arif, 1990, 952 pgs. It is published along with Muḥāsin al-Iṣţilāḥ by al-Bulqīnī.
- `Ulūm al-Ḥadīth li Ibn al-Ṣalāḥ, edited Nur al-Din `Itr. Damascus: Dār al-Fikr al-Mu`āṣir, 1998, 471 pgs.

An English translation by Eerik Dickinson, An Introduction to the Science of Hadith (2006), was published as part of the "Great Books of Islamic Civilization" series. Dickinson's translation features a biography of Ibn al-Ṣalāḥ derived from numerous sources, in addition to copious footnotes throughout.
