= Uns bint Abdulkarīm bin Ahmad al-Lakhmī al-Nastrāwī =

Egyptian hadith transmitter

Uns bint ʿAbd al-Karīm ibn Aḥmad al-Lakhmī al-Nastrāwī (Arabic: أنس بنت عبد الكريم بن أحمد اللخمي النصراوي; died 821 AH / 1418 CE), also known as Umm al-Kirām, was a Mamluk-era Egyptian transmitter of hadith associated with Cairo. She is documented in classical biographical dictionaries and is the subject of an extended entry in Muḥammad Akram Nadwī's 43-volume encyclopedia of female hadith scholars, al-Wafāʾ bi-Asmāʾ al-Nisāʾ.

== Early life and family ==
Uns was born into a prominent scholarly family in Cairo. Her father, Qāḍī Karīm al-Dīn ʿAbd al-Karīm ibn Aḥmad ibn ʿAbd al-ʿAzīz al-Lakhmī al-Nastrāwī, served as Nāẓir al-Jaysh (military administrator).

Her mother was Sāra bint Nāṣir al-Dīn Muḥammad ibn Anas ibn Minkū Tīmūr, who was associated with educational institutions near Bāb al-Qaṇṭara in Cairo.

She was the sister of Āmina and was married to Ibn Ḥajar al-ʿAsqalānī. In some sources she is referred to as Uns Khātūn bint ʿAbd al-Karīm ibn Aḥmad al-Lakhmī al-Nastrāwī al-Qāhirī.

== Career ==
According to Nadwī, Uns participated in the transmission of hadith and held scholarly sessions in Cairo. She heard and transmitted portions of major hadith collections, including Ṣaḥīḥ al-Bukhārī and Ṣaḥīḥ Muslim, as well as other hadith works and individual ajzāʾ (hadith parts).

Sources record that scholars attended readings connected to her transmission chains and that she granted ijāzāt (authorizations to transmit hadith). Her participation in scholarly gatherings is also noted by Al-Sakhawi.

== Death ==
Uns bint ʿAbd al-Karīm died in Muḥarram 821 AH (1418 CE) in Cairo.

== See also ==
- Al-Wafa bi Asma al-Nisa
