= Ramahurmuzi =

10th-century Muslim scholar

Abū Muḥammad al-Ḥasan ibn ʻAbd al-Raḥmān ibn Khallād al-Rāmahurmuzī
- Title: Judge (Qāḍī)

Personal life
- Born: Unknown
- Died: before 971 CE/360 AH
- Region: Rām-hurmuz
- Main interest(s): Hadith, poetry
- Notable work: al-Muḥaddith al-Fāṣil bayn al-Rāwī wa al-Wāʻī

Religious life
- Religion: Islam
- Creed: Sunni

Abū Muḥammad al-Ḥasan ibn ʻAbd al-Raḥmān ibn Khallād al-Rāmahurmuzī (Arabic: ابو محمد الحسن بن عبد الرحمن بن خلاد الرامهرمزي) (?–before 971 CE/360 AH), commonly referred to in medieval literature as Ibn al-Khallād, was a Persian hadith specialist and author who wrote one of the first comprehensive books compiled in hadith terminology literature, al-Muḥaddith al-Fāṣil bayn al-Rāwī wa al-Wāʻī.

== Biography ==
Al-Rāmahurmuzī's specific date of birth remains undetermined, but can be approximated based upon the dates of his teachers' deaths, placing his birth roughly 100 years prior to his own death. Therefore, 871/260 is a fairly sound estimate, according to The Encyclopaedia of Islam, based on the long life spans generally assumed for early hadith specialists. The name al-Rāmahurmuzī is an ascription to Rām-hurmuz a town in Khūzistān in present-day south-western Iran. The significance of Rām-hurmuz was its central location at the intersection of Ahwāz, Shūshtar, Iṣfahān and Fārs between the Āb -i Kurdistān and the Gūpāl rivers.

He first began his hadith studies in 903/290, hearing hadith from his father, ʻAbd al-Raḥmān ibn Khallād, and Muḥammad ibn ʻAbdillāh al-Ḥaḍarī, Abū al-Ḥuṣayn al-Wādiʻī, Muḥammad ibn Ḥibbān al-Māzinī and others from their generation. He worked as a judge (qāḍī) for a period of time, although little detail is provided. Al-Dhahabi described Al-Rāmahurmuzī as "the distinguished imam...who was from the imams of hadith and this will be apparent to anyone who reflects upon his work in the science of hadith."

His students include Abū al-Ḥusayn Muḥammad ibn Aḥmad al-Ṣaydāwī, al-Ḥasan ibn al-Layth al-Shīrāzī, Aḥmad ibn Mūsā ibn Mardawayh, Aḥmad ibn Isḥāq al-Nahāwandī and numerous others from the inhabitants of Persia.

Al-Dhahabi said he was unable to find the date of Al-Rāmahurmuzī's death and speculated it to have been during the 350s AH, between 961 and 971 CE. He then quoted Abū al-Qāsim ibn Mandah as mentioned in his work, al-Wafayāt, that Al-Rāmahurmuzī lived until almost 971/360 while living in the city of Rām-hurmuz. The Encyclopaedia of Islam specified his death as occurring in 971/360.

== Works ==
Al-Rāmahurmuzī was a poet and a few lines of his poetry were collected in Yatīmah al-Dahr by al-Thaʻālabī. Two of his works of prose remain until the present, both concerning the subject of hadith.

1. al-Muḥaddith al-Fāṣil bayn al-Rāwī wa al-Wāʻī—his most renowned work, is a comprehensive work on the subject of hadith terminology and biographical evaluation, It is considered by Ibn Ḥajr to be from amongst the first comprehensive works on its subject. ʻAlī al-Qārī explained that the expression used by Ibn Ḥajr leaves the impression that there were a number of similar works at the time Al-Rāmahurmuzī authored his therefore making difficult the determination of which was the first. The Encyclopaedia of Islam to be the first. Al-Muḥaddith al-Fāṣil influenced all subsequent works in its genre and is available in print, edited by Muḥammad ʻIjāj al-Khaṭīb in Beirut, 1971. Ibn Ḥajr commented that al-Muḥaddith al-Fāṣil did not include all of the relevant disciplines of hadith study. Al-Dhahabi said that he heard this work with an isnād going back to Al-Rāmahurmuzī.
2. Amthāl al-Nabī—a collection of about 140 proverbs in the form of hadiths which has been printed in two editions. The first was edited by Amatulkarim Qureshi in Hyderabad, 1968 and the second by M. M. al-ʻAthamī in Bombay, 1983.
3. Rabīʻ al-Mutayyim fī Akhbār al-ʻAshshāq
4. al-Nawādir
5. Risālah al-Safr
6. al-Ruqā wa al-Taʻāzī
7. Adab al-Nāṭiq
