= Nur al-Din al-Haythami =

14th-century Islamic scholar

Abu al-Hasan al-Haythami
- Title: Al-Ḥāfiẓ; Nur al-Din

Personal life
- Born: 30 735 AH (1334/1335 CE)
- Died: 807 AH (1404/1405 CE)
- Main interest(s): Hadith, Fiqh,
- Notable work: Majma' al-Zawa'id

Religious life
- Religion: Islam
- Denomination: Sunni
- Jurisprudence: Shafi'i
- Creed: Ashari

Muslim leader
- Influenced by: Al-Shafi'i Abu Hasan al-Ash'ari Ibn Hibban Zain al-Din al-'Iraqi
- Influenced: Ibn Hajar al-Asqalani

Nur al-Din `Ali ibn Abi Bakr ibn Sulayman, Abu al-Hasan al-Haythami (Arabic: نور الدين الهيثمي, commonly known as Nur al-Din al-Haythami was a famous Sunni Egyptian scholar and an eminent Hadith expert who wrote lengthy works on hadith sciences.

== Biography ==
He was born in Cairo in the month of Rajab in 735 H. corresponding to 1335 CE. He learned the Qur'an and memorized it, and when he was a teenager, he became a disciple of a highly renowned scholar of Hadith, Abd Al-Raheem ibn Al-Hussain ibn Abd Al-Rahman, who was better known as Zain al-Din al-'Iraqi.

Al-Haythami became a committed associate of Al-Iraqi, staying with him all the time, travelling with him when he travelled, and offering the pilgrimage in his company. He attended with him every circle he attended in Cairo, other cities in Egypt, Mecca, Medina, Jerusalem, Damascus, Baalbek, Aleppo and other places. The only teacher under whom Al-Haythami read, without being attended by Al-Iraqi, was Ibn Abd Al-Hadi, from whom he heard the Sahih collection of Imam Muslim. On the other hand, Al-Iraqi heard from only four teachers without Al-Haythami taking part.

Al-Iraqi, who was only ten years older than Al-Haythami, was a highly distinguished scholar of Hadith. Al-Haythami was also to distinguish himself as a scholar of Hadith, but despite his broad scholarly achievement, he preferred to remain in the shadow of his teacher and friend, Al-Iraqi. Indeed, Al-Iraqi heavily relied on Al-Haythami in conducting much of his affairs, and gave him his daughter in marriage. He trained him in a particular area of Hadith scholarship and Al-Haythami was to achieve distinction in this field and to produce highly valuable works in it.

== Character ==
Al-Haythami was exemplary in his religious devotion, and his serious approach to Hadith scholarship. He cared little for worldly matters, which are the main preoccupation of many people, dedicating himself to the study of Hadith, and associating only with Hadith scholars. While Al-Iraqi was alive, he taught Hadith in his presence. Similarly, Al-Iraqi rarely taught without Al-Haythami being present. But after Al-Iraqi's death, he was sought by many students who wished to read under him. He taught unhesitatingly, but without assuming any personal distinction. He is praised by many scholars for his humility, kindly manner, and dedication to learning.

While many scholars mention his commitment to his teacher, showing him great respect in all situations, all are agreed that his own knowledge was broad, and that he distinguished himself by his great achievement in Hadith scholarship.

== Students ==
His most famous students:

- Ibn Hajar al-Asqalani
- Ibn al-'Ajmi
- Ibn Fahad al-Makki

== Death ==
Al-Haythami died on 19 Ramadan 807 H, corresponding to 1405 CE.

== Reception ==
Ibn Hajar al-Asqalani describes him as: "Very kind, highly critical of anyone indulging in a practice that is unacceptable to Islam, yet he was extremely tolerant when it came to personal grievances. When other students of Al-Iraqi repeatedly tried to irritate him, he simply tolerated them without much complaint."

Taqi al-Din al-Fasi said: “ He was a great hafiz of texts and narrations.”

Al-Aqfahsi said: “ He was a scholarly imam, memorizer, ascetic, humble, sympathetic to people, of worship and piety.”

Al-Sakhawi said : “ It was a wonder in religion, piety, asceticism, interest in knowledge, worship, rituals, serving the sheikh, not mixing with people in any matter, and love in hadith and its people.”

== Works ==
Al-Haythami was prolific in hadith, and among the books he wrote:

- Majma' al-Zawa'id wa Manba' al-Fawa'id ("Appendix complex and the source of benefits")
- Mawarid al-Dham'an ila Zawa'id Ibn Hibbaan ('ala Sahihain) ("Arrangement of trustworthy Ibn Hibban")
- A-lbadr al-Monir fi Mulahiq al-Mujam al-Kabiri ("Full moon enlightening in the appendages of the great lexicon")
- Min Ajl al-Bahth an Zawaya al-Harithi ("In order to search for appendages Harith")
- Tartib al-Thaqib Lilujuli ("Arrangement of holes for calves")
- Al-gharad al-Taqribiu fi Tartib Ahadith al-Zakhrafati ("Approximate purpose in the arrangement of conversations ornament")
- Idafat Ibn Majah an al-Kitab al-Khamsati ("Additions of Ibn Majah on the five books")
- Al-gharad Min al-Maqsid fi Tajawuzat 'Ahmed ("The purpose of the destination in the excesses of Ahmed")
- Kashf Zawayid al-Mutasawili ("Uncovering the appendages of the beggar")
- Majma al-Bahrayn fi Mulahiq al-Majimi ("Bahrain Complex in the appendices of lexicons")
- Majme al-Thadayil Masdar al-Fawayidi. ("Appendix complex and the source of benefits")
- Al-Wijhat fi Mulahiq 'Abu Ali ("The highest destination in the appendages of Abu Ali")
- Akthar Mutatish Lima 'Adafah Ibn Hibban ("More thirsty for the additions of Ibn Hibban")

== See also ==
- List of Ash'aris and Maturidis
- Islamic scholars
