= Zain al-Din al-'Iraqi =

14th-century hadith scholar

Imam Zain al-Din al-'Iraqi
- زين الدين العراقي
- Title: Shaykh al-Islām; Zain al-Din; Al-Ḥāfiẓ

Personal life
- Born: 1325 Cairo, Mamluk Egypt (present‐day Egypt)
- Died: 1403 (aged 78) Cairo
- Era: Mamluk period
- Region: Egypt
- Main interest(s): Hadith sciences, Islamic jurisprudence
- Notable work: Alfiyya of al-Iraqi
- Occupation: Scholar, Traditionist, Jurist

Religious life
- Religion: Islam
- Denomination: Sunni
- Jurisprudence: Shafi'i
- Creed: Ash'ari

Muslim leader
- Influenced by: Al-Shafi'i Abu Hasan al-Ash'ari Al-Ghazali Ibn al-Salah Taqi al-Din al-Subki Salah al-Din al-Ala'i Jamal al-Din al-Isnawi Ibn Kathir Ibn Abd al-Hadi
- Influenced: Wali al-Din al-'Iraqi Nur al-Din al-Haythami Ibn Hajar al-Asqalani Badr al-Din al-Ayni Ibn Rajab Ibn al-Jazari Taqi al-Din al-Fasi Al-Damiri Al-Qalqashandi

ʿAbd al-Raḥīm b. Ḥusayn b. ʿAbd al-Raḥmān b. Ibrāhīm b. Abū Bakr b. Ibrāhīm al-Kurdī al-Miṣrī al-Rāzinānī al-Mihrānī al-Irāqī al-Atharī al-Shāfiʿī Arabic: عبد الرحيم بن حسين بن عبد الرحمن بن إبراهيم بن أبي بكر بن إبراهيم الكردي المصري الرازناني المهراني العراقي الأثري الشافعي, (Note: The nisba “al-Atharī”, however, is of a different nature. The word athar is, in its broadest sense, synonymous with ḥadīth, and according to some scholars, it refers to “everything transmitted from the Messenger of God (peace be upon him).” For this reason, many scholars—especially those of Khurasan—referred to those engaged in the study of ḥadīth as atharīs. Thus, the use of the nisba al-Atharī for al-Irāqī indicates his scholarly orientation and competence: namely, that he was a scholar who primarily devoted himself to the science of ḥadīth. For even though al-Irāqī was involved in many branches of knowledge, at his core he was a muḥaddith, distinguished especially by his works in the field of ḥadīth.) commonly known as Zain al-Din al-'Iraqi (Arabic: زين الدين العراقي or shortly Al-Ḥāfiẓ al-ʿIrāqī (Arabic: ابن الملقن; 725-806 AH/ 1325–1403 CE) was an Egyptian-Kurdish Islamic scholar. He is widely described by contemporaries as "the greatest hadith scholar in his age". A scholar of immense memory and precision, he achieved mastery over every branch of hadith sciences and became a central authority for both transmission (riwāya) and comprehension (dirāya). Revered for his piety, humility, and intellectual depth, al-ʿIrāqī's influence shaped the study of hadith for generations.

== Lineage ==
Although the sources do not provide extensive detail regarding his lineage, his father, Ḥusayn, who was of Kurdish origin, came as a child from the town of Rāznān, which was near Erbil in northern Iraq, and settled in Cairo. When Irāqī was three years old, his father passed away.

== Early life ==
=== Birth ===
He was born to an Iraqi father and an Egyptian mother on 21 Jumādā al-Awwal 725 AH, corresponding to 5 May 1325 CE in Cairo. When al-Ḥāfiẓ al-Irāqī was born, his father took him to Shaykh Taqi al-Dīn al-Qanāwī for supplication, taḥnīk (placing a sweet substance in the infant's mouth), and seeking blessing.

When ʿAbd al-Raḥīm was three years old, his father passed away. As a result, he came under the guardianship of his father's close companion, Shaykh Taqi al-Dīn al-Qanāwī (d. 744/1343), and was raised under his care and guidance. The name ʿAbd al-Raḥīm was also given to him by this shaykh, in honour of his own teacher and grandfather, Shaykh ʿAbd al-Raḥīm al-Qanāwī (d. 692/1292).

=== Education ===
Irāqī possessed a remarkably strong memory; by the age of eight he had memorized the Qurān as well as some of the main introductory texts studied in various Islamic sciences, including Abū Isḥāq al-Shīrāzī's al-Tanbih on Shāfiʿī jurisprudence.

He initially concentrated on Quranic recitation and Arabic language, studying the seven canonical modes of recitation under ʿAbd al-Raḥmān b. Aḥmad al-Baghdādī and others. Meanwhile, he also trained himself in jurisprudence (fiqh), legal theory (uṣūl al-fiqh), and Quranic exegesis (tafsīr).

Among his most distinguished teachers in the science of ḥadīth was Izz al-Dīn ibn Jamā'ah (d. 767 AH), who strongly influenced him. It was Ibn Jamā'ah who advised him to shift from studying Qur'anic recitations to the science of ḥadīth, having noticed his keen intelligence. He said to him:

"You are sharp-minded and of sound intellect — devote your ambition and effort to the science of ḥadīth."

This motivated him to turn toward the science of ḥadīth, where he eventually settled and specialized. Although his exact age when he began studying ḥadīth is not definitively known, it is known that he was engaged in ḥadīth studies by the age of twelve, that he received his first lessons in ḥadīth from Ibn al-Bābā (d. 799/1396), and that he learned the core ḥadīth literature in Cairo from Ibn al-Turkmānī (d. 750/1349). Indeed, it is recorded that he studied Ṣaḥīḥ al-Bukhārī with both Ibn al-Turkmānī and ʿAbd al-Raḥīm b. ʿAbd Allāh b. Shāhid al-Jaysh.

After traveling through the main centers of knowledge in Egypt, especially Cairo and Alexandria receiving lessons and transmissions from the muḥaddithin there, he travelled to the east and southeast, to places such as Damascus, Aleppo, Hama, Homs, Nablus, Gaza, Jerusalem, Mecca, and Medina; and to the west, including Tripoli and Baalbek. He undertook numerous riḥlas (scholarly journeys) to centers where he heard that notable scholars of ḥadīth resided, in order to benefit from them. It was said al-Irāqī was gifted with exceptional intelligence and quick comprehension, capable of memorizing an entire book of ḥadīth in just a single day.

=== Teachers ===
He studied among the greatest scholars of his time:

- Taqi al-Dīn al-Subkī
- Salāh al-Dīn al-ʿAlāʾī
- Izz al-Dīn Ibn Jamāʿah
- Ibn Kathir
- The Shāfiʿī jurist al-Isnawī
- Ibn ʿAbd al-Hādī

== Scholarly life ==
=== Career ===
Al-Ḥāfiẓ al-Irāqī's engagement with knowledge extended far beyond study and authorship; he was deeply involved in teaching, issuing legal opinions, and reviving scholarly traditions. He held teaching posts and delivered lectures in numerous madrasas, which served as the principal centers of higher learning in his time. Among the main institutions where he taught were Dār al-Ḥadīth al-Kāmiliyya and al-Madrasa al-Zāhiriyya al-Qadīma in Cairo, as well as al-Madrasa al-Qarasnikriyya. He also taught in the Fāḍiliyya Madrasa, where he lectured on jurisprudence, and he established public teaching circles in Jāmiʿ Ibn Ṭūlūn and Jāmiʿ al-Fāḍiliyya.

His teaching activities were not limited to Egypt. In Syria, Mecca, and Medina he taught ḥadīth, trained students, and issued legal opinions (fatwās). During his residence in the Ḥaramayn al-Sharīfayn, he taught in various mosques and madrasas. Beginning on 12 Jumādā al-Awwal 788 (1386), he served for three years and five months in Medina al-Munawwara as qāḍī, as well as imām and khaṭīb in the Prophet's Mosque. Later, he was also appointed judge in Mecca.

Al-Irāqī devoted himself completely to ḥadīth—its study, teaching, and transmission. He revived the tradition of public dictation sessions (imlāʾ), which had largely fallen out of practice since the era of Ibn al-Ṣalāḥ al-Shahrazūrī. He began these sessions in Medina in 795 (1393) and continued them in Cairo until six months before his death, delivering a total of 416 sessions over eleven years. According to Ibn Ḥajar, the majority of the ḥadīth he dictated in these assemblies he recited from memory.

=== Students ===
Nearly all prominent scholars of his era benefited from him:

- Nur al-Din al-Haythami
- Wali al-Din al-'Iraqi
- Ibn Hajar al-Asqalani
- Badr al-Din al-Ayni
- Ibn Rajab
- Ibn al-Jazari
- Taqi al-Din al-Fasi
- Al-Damiri
- Al-Qalqashandi
- Ibn al-'Ajmi
- Shihab al-Din al-Busiri

Ibn Kathīr, though twenty-four years his senior, read some works under him and benefited from him in ḥadīth verification. Al-Irāqī most outstanding students, however, were: Nūr al-Dīn al-Haythamī, Ibn Ḥajar al-ʿAsqalānī, and his son, Abū Zur'a, known as Ibn al-Irāqī. Al-Haythamī was his student, son-in-law, and closest companion. Ibn Ḥajar studied under al-Irāqī for ten years and was Ibn Hajar's most important teacher in hadith studies. His son Abū Zurʿa benefited continually from him as well.

When al-Irāqī was asked near the end of his life who remained after him who could be counted among the ḥuffāẓ (leading masters of ḥadīth), he named first Ibn Ḥajar, then his son Ibn al-Irāqī, and third Nūr al-Dīn al-Haythamī, an indication of the special attention he gave to these three students who would succeed him and become the top three ḥuffāẓ of their era.

== Death ==
He died on the night of Wednesday, the 8th of Sha'bān, 806 AH, in Cairo. He was buried in their family cemetery outside Bāb al-Barqiyyah, and his funeral was widely attended. The prayer over him was led by Shihāb al-Dīn al-Dhahabī.

He died at the age of eighty-one years and three months. Nūr al-Dīn al-Haythamī related that Shaykh Zayn al-Dīn al-‘Irāqī saw in a dream the Prophet Jesus, and the angels praying over him — a vision taken as a sign of his virtue and acceptance with Allah.

Following his death, one of his most distinguished students, Ibn Ḥajar al-ʿAsqalānī, composed a long elegiac poem (marthiya) mourning him.

== Legacy ==
Zayn al-Dīn al-ʿIrāqī was remembered by his contemporaries as one of the three intellectual marvels of his age: Zayn al-Dīn al-ʿIrāqī as the foremost authority in ḥadīth; Sirāj al-Dīn al-Bulqīnī as the foremst Shāfiʿī jurist; and Ibn al-Mulaqqin as the most prolific author. His student Ibn Ḥajar al-ʿAsqalānī declared that he had never encountered anyone more knowledgeable in the science of ḥadīth than al-ʿIrāqī, while al-Suyūṭī identified him as the mujaddid (renewer) of the 8th/14th century in ḥadīth.

Ḥāfiẓ al-ʿIrāqī was celebrated as an exceptionally versatile scholar of ḥadīth, mastering every major discipline within its sciences, including ʿilm al-rijāl (the study of narrators’ biographies), taḥrīj (tracing ḥadīth sources), ʿilm al-dirāyah (understanding the meaning of ḥadīth), ʿilm al-riwāyah (methods of transmission), jarḥ wa taʿdīl (criticism and accreditation of narrators), ghurab al-ḥadīth (rare ḥadīth), and ʿilal al-ḥadīth (hidden defects in ḥadīth). Considered a very rare feat even among the scholars of ḥadīth. Scholars themselves acknowledged, as he once remarked, that he was "the only one who encompassed all the sciences of ḥadīth." His stature was such that his own teachers, among them: Taqī al-Dīn al-Subkī, al-ʿAlāʾī, Ibn Kathīr, Ibn Jamāʿah, and al-Isnawī all spoke highly of him and adopted his judgments, and deferred to his insight. They described him as a person of wisdom and insight, which demonstrates the authority and depth he possessed in knowledge.

By the time of his death, al-ʿIrāqī had become a reference point for the entire tradition of ḥadīth studies. His works, students, and methodological legacy ensured that the discipline would continue with renewed strength for generations after him.

== Reception ==
Al-al-Irāqī was widely regarded by his contemporaries:

ʿIzz al-Dīn ibn Jamā'ah said: “Everyone in the land of Egypt who claims expertise in ḥadīth is beneath him, for he is the sole true claimant.”

Ibn Nāṣir al-Dīn said: “He was a Shaykh, Imam, Allāmah, and unique. He was the ḥāfiẓ of his age, the shaykh of muḥaddithin, the mark of the critics, and the foremost of the scholars of ḥadīth classification.”

Ibn Fahd: “He was a unique Imam, Allāmah, experienced scholar (ḥibr), authority (ḥujjah), critic (naqīḍ), support of the people, the ḥāfiẓ of Islam, the singular of his age, and the one unmatched of his time. He surpassed all scholars of his era in memorization and mastery, and the Imams of his time testified to his unrivaled expertise in his discipline.”

== Works ==
Having devoted his life to the path of knowledge, al-Irāqī did not limit himself to reading, learning, and teaching; he also synthesized what he had learned with his own knowledge and composed it in writing. He produced numerous works both in his field of expertise, ḥadīth, and in other Islamic disciplines. Some of these works have survived to the present day, while others have not. The works attributed to al-Irāqī include:

=== Hadith ===
1. Iḥbār al-Aḥyāʾ bi-Aḥbār al-Iḥyāʾ
2. Al-Kashf al-Mubīn ʿan Taḥrīj al-Iḥyāʾ ʿUlūm al-Dīn
3. Al-Mughnī ʿan Ḥamli'l-Asfār fī'l-Asfār fī Taḥrīj Mā fī'l-Iḥyāʾ min al-Aḥbār
4. Al-Takyīd wa'l-ʾĪẓāḥ limā Utlika wa Ughliqa min Muqaddimat Ibn al-Ṣalāḥ
5. Alfiyya of al-Iraqi
6. Takrīb al-Asānīd wa Tartīb al-Masānīd
7. Zayl ʿalā Mīzān al-Iʿtidāl
8. Taḥrīj Aḥādīth al-Minhāj li’l-Bayzāwī
9. Naẓm al-Minhāj al-Wuṣūl ilā ʿIlm al-Usūl (al-Najm al-Wahhāj fī Naẓm al-Minhāj)
10. Takmīlat Sharḥ al-Tirmidhī
11. Kitāb al-Arbaʿīn al-ʿUshāriyyah
12. Al-Tusāʿiyyāt
13. Al-Bāʿiṣ ʿalā al-Ḥalās min Ḥawādis al-Quṣṣāṣ
14. Al-Durar al-Saniyya fī (Naẓm)
15. Al-Siyr al-Zakiyya (fī Naẓm al-Sīrah al-Nabawiyya)
16. Al-Kurab fī Maḥabbati’l-ʿArab
17. Kurrah al-ʿAyn bi'l-Masarrat bi-Wafāʾ al-Dīn
18. Al-Risālah
19. Nukāt al-Fatāwā ʿalā al-Muḥtaṣarāt
20. Al-Mustahraç ʿalā al-Mustadrak li'l-Hākim
21. Majālis-i Sabʿah
22. Muḥtaṣar fī'l-Aḥādīth al-Mutaʿalliqah bi'l-Aḥkām
23. Al-ʿAdad al-Muʿtabar fī'l-Awjuh allatī Bayna al-Ṣuwar
24. Istihbāb al-Wudūʾ
25. Al-Istiʿāzah bi'l-Wāḥid min Iqāmat Ḥummaʿateyn bi-Makān Wāḥid
26. Tamyīz al-Ashāb
27. Zayl al-Tārīkh al-Islām
28. Al-Kalām ʿalā al-Aḥādīth allātī Tukallimuhu Fīhā bi'l-Waḍʿ wa Hiya fī Musnad al-Imām Aḥmad
29. Fatwā fī Anna Mā Uʿtida Yawma ʿĀshūrāʾ min Akli al-Dajjāj wa’l-Ḥubūb al-Mubāḥ
30. Amālī fīmā Yataʿallaqu bi'l-Istiskāʾ

=== Other ===
1. Ajwibat Ibn al-ʿArabī
2. Iḥyāʾ Qalbi'l-Mayyit bi Dhukhūl al-Bayt
3. Al-Istiʿāzah bi'l-Wāḥid min Iqāmat Ḥummaʿateyn fī Makān Wāḥid
4. Asmāʾ Allāh al-Ḥusnā
5. Alfiyya fī Gharīb al-Qurʾān
6. Tatimmāt al-Muhimmāt
7. Tārīkh Taḥrīm al-Ribā
8. Tarjamat al-Isnevī
9. Tafdīl Zamzam
10. Faḍl Gharī Hirāʾ
11. Kurrah al-ʿAyn bi Wafāʾ al-Dīn
12. Masʾalat al-Shurb Kāʾiman
13. Al-Kalām ʿalā Masʾalat al-Sujūd li-Tark al-Ṣalāt

== See also ==
- List of Ash'aris

== Bibliography ==
- Necip Sefa Demir (30 December 2024). "A General Overview of the Life and Works of Zayn al-Din al-Iraqi". Journal of Baberti (20). Bayburt University: 72–88. doi:10.47098/babertidergisi.1574176. ISSN 3023-4107.
- Yasser Abd al-Wahid Abdullah Qabil (January 2021). "Al-Ḥāfiz al-Iraqi's Modern System and His Approach to Explaining It". Research Journal of the Faculty of Arts. 32 (124.1). Menoufia University: 3–27. doi:10.21608/sjam.2021.194685. eISSN 2735-329X. ISSN 2090-2956.
