= Al-Sakhawi =

15th-century Muslim scholar

Shams al-Din al-Sakhawi
- شمس الدين السخاوي
- Title: Al-Hafiz, Shams al-Din

Personal life
- Born: 1428 CE (831 AH); Cairo, Egypt
- Died: 1497 CE (902 AH); Medina
- Region: Middle Eastern Scholar
- Main interest(s): Hadith, History

Religious life
- Religion: Islam
- Jurisprudence: Shafi‘i
- Creed: Ash'ari

Muslim leader
- Influenced by: Ibn Hajar al-Asqalani
- Influenced: Al-Qastallani, Al-Suyuti

Shams al-Dīn Muḥammad ibn ‘Abd al-Raḥmān al-Sakhāwī (Arabic: شمس الدين محمد بن عبدالرحمن السخاوي, 1428/831 AH – 1497/902 AH) was a Shafi‘i Muslim hadith scholar and historian who was born in Cairo. Al-Sakhawi refers to the village of Sakha in Egypt, where his relatives belonged. He was a prolific writer that excelled in the knowledge of hadith, tafsir, literature, and history. His work was also anthropological. For example, in Egypt he recorded the marital history of 500 women, the largest sample on marriage in the Middle Ages, and found that at least a third of all women in the Mamluk Sultanate of Egypt and the Bilad al-Sham married more than once, with many marrying three or more times. According to al-Sakhawi, as many as three out of ten marriages in 15th century Cairo ended in divorce. His proficiency in hadith has its influences trace back heavily on his Shaykh al-Hafiz, ibn Hajar al-`Asqalani. He died in Medina.

== Works ==
=== About Hadith ===
- Al-Jawāhir al-Mukallalah fī al-Aḥādīth al-Musalsalah (The Crowned Jewels in the Narrated Chains of Prophetic Traditions)
- Al-Ghāyah fī Sharḥ al-Hidāyah fī ʿIlm al-Riwāyah li-Ibn al-Jazarī (The Ultimate Guide in the Explanation of Al-Hidayah in the Science of Narration by Ibn al-Jazari)
- Sharḥ al-Taqrīb wa al-Taysīr li-Maʿrifat al-Bashīr wa al-Nadhīr lil-Nawawī (Explanation of Al-Taqrib and Al-Taysir for Knowing the Bearer of Glad Tidings and Warnings by Al-Nawawi)
- Sharḥ al-Shamāʾil al-Nabawiyyah li-Al-Tirmidhī (Commentary on Shama'il al-Muhammadiyya by Al-Tirmidhi)
- Al-Tuḥfah al-Manīfah fīmā Waqaʿa min Ḥadīth Abī Ḥanīfah (The Glorious Gift Regarding the Hadiths Attributed to Abu Hanifa)
- Al-Tawḍīḥ al-Abhar li-Tadhkirat Ibn al-Mulaqqin fī ʿIlm al-Athar (The Clear Elucidation of Ibn al-Mulaqqin’s Treatise on the Science of Prophetic Traditions)
- Fatḥ al-Mughīth bi-Sharḥ Alfiyyat al-Ḥadīth (The Enlightening Opening: Commentary on the Thousand Verses on Hadith), a monumental commentary on Alfiyya of al-Iraqi by Zain al-Din al-Iraqi.
- Al-Qawl al-Badīʿ fī Faḍl al-Ṣalāh ʿalā al-Ḥabīb al-Shafīʿ (The Radiant Discourse on the Virtue of Sending Blessings upon the Prophet)
- Al-Maqāṣid al-Ḥasanah fī al-Aḥādīth al-Mushtahirah ʿalā al-Alsinah (The Noble Objectives Regarding Widely Known Hadiths)

=== About History and Biographies ===
- Al-Ḍawʾ al-Lāmiʿ fī Aʿyān al-Qarn al-Tāsiʿ (The Radiant Light on the Notables of the Ninth Century)
- Al-Tibr al-Masbūk fī Dhayl al-Sulūk (The Cast Gold: A Supplement to "Al-Suluk" by Al-Maqrizi)
- Buġyat al-ʿUlamāʾ wa al-Ruwāt fī Akhbār al-Quḍāt
- Al-Iʿlān bi al-Tawbīkh li-man Dhamm Ahl al-Tawārīkh (The Announcement of Rebuke to Those Who Condemn Historians)
- Al-Jawāhir wa al-Durar fī Tarjamat Shaykh al-Islām Ibn Ḥajar (The Jewels and Pearls: A Biography of Shaykh al-Islam Ibn Hajar)

=== Others ===
- Al-Tuhfah al-latifah fi Tarikh al-Madinah al-Sharifah (التحفة اللطيفة في تاريخ المدينة الشريفة): About Madinah al-Munawwara.
- Ashratu Sa'ah (Signs of the Day of Judgment) – which has been recently reprinted with 'Tahqiq' by Muhammad al-'Aqeel.
- Al-riḥlah al-Ḥalabīyah wa tarājimihā (الرحلة الحلبية وتراجمها)
- Al-riḥlah al-Makkīyah (الرحلة المكية)
- Al-riḥlah al-Sakandarīyah (الرحلة السكندرية)
- Al-baladaniyat al-ʻalīyāt (البلدنيات العليات): A book where he recorded the names of 80 towns he visited and took knowledge from its scholars.
- Bughyat al-rāwī bi-man akhadha ʻanhu al-Sakhawi (بغية الراوي بمن أخذ عنه السخاوي) or Al-imtinān bi-shuyūkh Muhammad ibn `Abd al-Rahman (الامتنان بشيوخ محمد بن عبد الرحمن): A dictionary that lists the names of all his teachers.

== See also ==
- List of Ash'aris and Maturidis
