= Tahthib Al-Kamal fi Asma' Al-rijal =

Book by Jamal al-Din al-Mizzi in the field of biographical evaluation

Tathhib Al-Kamal fi Asma' Al-rijal
- Author: Jamal al-Din al-Mizzi
- Original title: تهذيب الكمال في أسماء الرجال
- Language: Arabic (originally)
- Subject: Hadith
- Genre: biographical evaluation
- Publication place: Syria

"Tahthib Al-Kamal fi Asma' Al-rijal" (Arabic: تهذيب الكمال في أسماء الرجال) is a book by Jamal al-Din al-Mizzi (654-742 AH), where he refined, revised, and added upon the work of Abd al-Ghani al-Maqdisi in his book Al-Kamal fi Asma' al-Rijal. It contains biographies of hadith narrators from the six major hadith collections, evaluating their reliability and contributions. The book is an important resource in the field of biographical evaluation within Islamic studies.

== Overview ==
While the book 'Al-Kamal' limited itself to mentioning the men of the Six Books, Al-Mizzi went further and supplemented what al-Maqdisi had missed of the narrators of these books, He scrutinized those mentioned and removed some who did not meet his criteria, and they were few. Then, he added to his book the narrators who appeared in some of the works he had selected from the authors of the Six Books. Thus, he increased the original biographies by more than seventeen hundred.

Al-Mizzi also added to most of the original biographies new historical material about the teachers of the subject of the biography, his students, what was said about him in terms of criticism, correction, or authentication, the date of his birth or death, and so on, so that most of the biographies expanded greatly.

After all this, Al-Mazi added four important chapters to the end of his book, which the author of 'Al-Kamal' did not mention:

- A chapter on those who were famous in relation to their father, grandfather, mother, uncle, or the like.
- A chapter on those who were famous in relation to a tribe, city, profession, or the like.
- A chapter on those who were famous by a nickname or similar.
- A chapter on the ambiguous.

== See also ==
- Al-Majdi fi Ansab al-Talibiyyin
