= Taqi al-Din al-Fasi =

Maliki judge and Historian

Taqi al-Din al-Fasi (تقي الدين الفاسي)
- Title: Shaykh al-Islām; Maliki Qadi of Mecca; Al-Ḥāfiẓ

Personal life
- Born: 8 September 1373 Mecca
- Died: 6 July 1429 (aged 55) Mecca
- Region: Hejaz
- Notable work: Al-ʻIqd al-thamīn fī tārīkh al-Balad al-Amīn
- Occupation: Scholar, Jurist, Traditionist, Judge, Historian, Genealogist

Religious life
- Religion: Islam
- Denomination: Sunni
- Jurisprudence: Maliki
- Creed: Ash'ari

Muslim leader
- Influenced by: Malik ibn Anas Abu Hasan al-Ash'ari Zain al-Din al-Iraqi Ibn Hajar al-Asqalani Nur al-Din al-Haythami Firuzabadi

Taqi al-Din Muhammad ibn Ahmad al-Fasi (Arabic: تقي الدين أبي الطيب محمد بن أحمد الفاسي, 8 September 1373, in Mecca, Hejaz – 6 July 1429, in Mecca, Hejaz) was an Arab Muslim scholar, muhaddith (hadith scholar), faqih (jurist), historian, genealogist and a Maliki qadi (judge) in Mecca.

He is best known for his work on the history of Mecca entitled Al-ʻIqd al-thamīn fī tārīkh al-Balad al-Amīn which reached around 18 volumes. He also wrote on the genealogies of some Arab tribes of Tihamah.

== Family background ==
His family claimed descent from the Islamic prophet Muhammad through his grandson, Hasan ibn Ali.

In the year 679 AH, Taqi al-Din al-Fasi's great grandfather, Abu Abdullah Muhammad bin Muhammad bin Abdul Rahman Al-Fassi left what is now Morocco, traveling to Mecca, which he entered in the year 686 AH. He took care of his three sons, Muhammad, Ahmed, and Ali (Al-Fassi’s grandfather) and raised them to love knowledge, so they became among the scholars of Mecca, and in turn they produced scholars. Among them was Ahmed bin Ali (father of Al-Fassi), one of the senior Muftis in Mecca, in addition to his mandate as a representative judiciary.

In the eighth century AH, the al-Fassi family became one of the largest families in Mecca, and it supported its scholarly influence through intermarriage with large families in Mecca. The sister of the historian Taqi al-Din al-Fassi, Umm Hani, married the Emir of Mecca, Sayyid Hassan Ibn Ajlan.

== Life ==
He was born on Thursday, 8 September 1373 in Mecca, Hejaz, now Saudi Arabia, but spent part of his early life in Medina with his mother after her divorce from his father. He eventually returned to Mecca as a young man where he took knowledge from its scholars, and in the year 789 AH he completed memorizing the Holy Qur’an and led the people in Tarawih prayers in the Masjid al-Haram.

Starting in the year 796 AH, al-Fassi began his scientific journey, travelling between Medina, Jerusalem, Damascus, Cairo, and Alexandria. Two of the four trips he made to Egypt and the Levant lasted three years. His teachers were numerous and their specializations and countries varied as a result of his continuous travels. The number of his sheikhs reached more than 500 scholars, as stated in his index. Among his most famous teachers who were among the greatest ulama of his era include: Zain al-Din al-Iraqi, Ibn Hajar al-Asqalani, Nur al-Din al-Haythami, and Firuzabadi.

After completing his academic career, he became a teacher of Maliki fiqh at the Ghiyathiyyah Madrasah in Mecca, which was considered one of the best Islamic institutions in the country and was funded by the Sultan of Bengal Ghiyasuddin Azam Shah. He would also teach in the Grand Mosque of Mecca in the year 800 AH. After seven years he assumed the position of Qadi of Malikiyah in Mecca for ten consecutive years until the year 817 AH, when he was dismissed as a result of competition and intrigued against him. This was the fate of his contemporary Ibn Khaldun when he was removed from the position of judge in Cairo.

He went blind four years before his death in 1425 AD. He died on Wednesday 6 July 1429 at the age of 55 in Mecca, Hejaz, Arabian Peninsula, now Saudi Arabia.

== Reception ==
Ibn Hajar al-Asqalani described him at the time as: “The benefactor of the Hijaz country and its scholar.”

As for Al-Maqrizi, the historian of Egypt said: “He is a sea of knowledge and a treasure trove of benefits... and he did not leave behind anyone like him in the Hijaz.”

== Works ==
al-Fasi was a prolific writer who wrote numerous works on hadith, jurisprudence, history, genealogy, tasawwuf, etc. His famous works include:

- Al-ʻIqd al-thamīn fī tārīkh al-Balad al-Amīn (العقد الثمين فى تاريخ البلد الأمين): His largest and most important work, and probably the largest in the field of Meccan history, where he compiled the biographies of Meccans from the early days of Islam up until his time.
- Shifāʼ al-gharām bi-akhbār al-Balad al-Ḥarām (شفاء الغرام بأخبار البلد الحرام)
- Al-Muqniʻ min akhbār al-mulūk wa-al-khulafāʼ wa-wulāt Makkah al-shurafā (المقنع من أخبار الملوك والخلفاء وولاة مكة الشرفاء)
- Al-Zuhūr al-muqtaṭafah min tārīkh Makkah al-Musharrafah (الزهور المقتطفة من تاريخ مكة المشرفة)
- Dhayl al-taqīīd fī rūāh al-sunan wa al-masānīd (ذيل التقييد بمعرفة رواة السنن والمسانيد)
