= Musnad Ahmad ibn Hanbal =

9th-century compilation of Islamic narratives

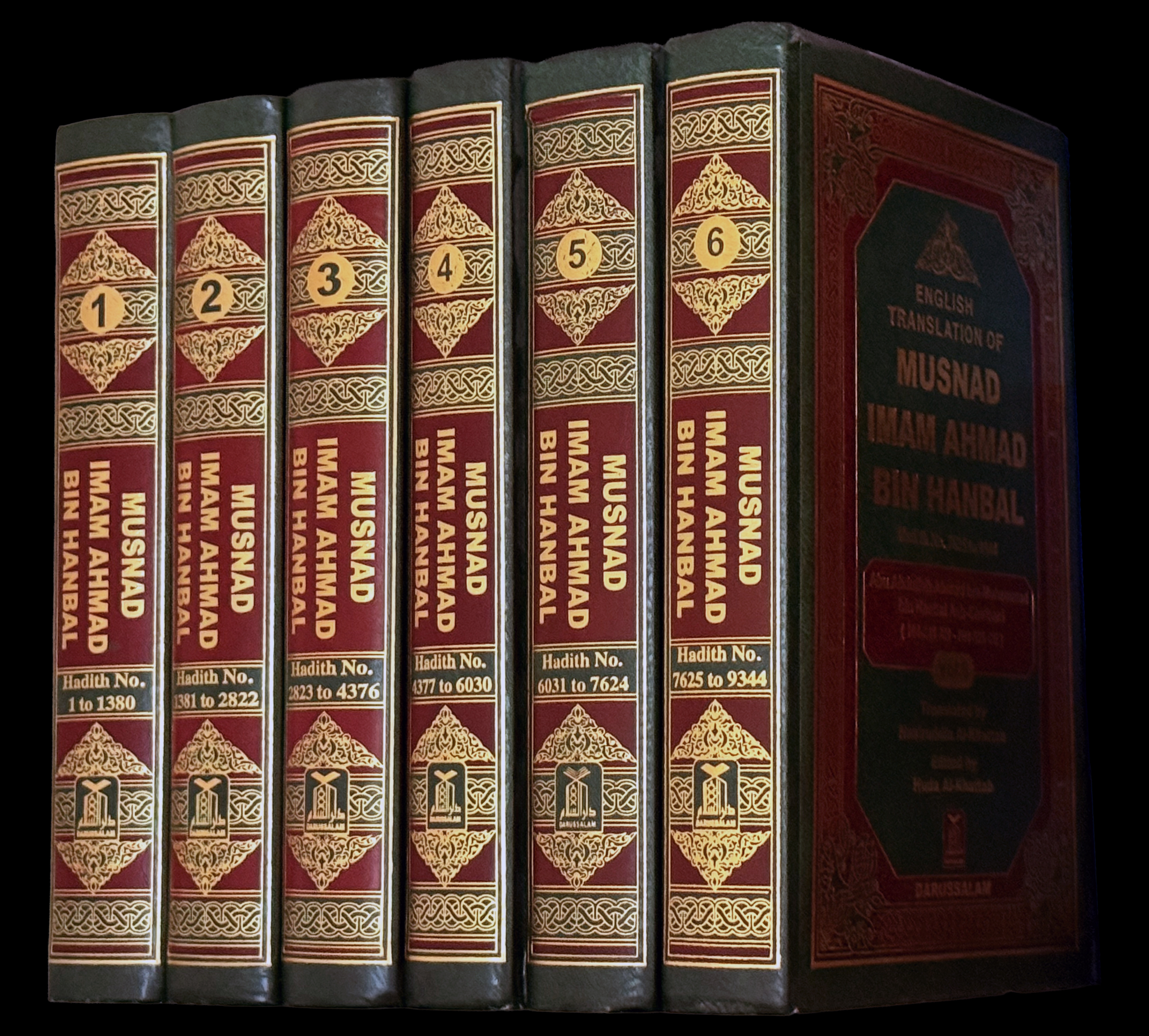
- Six volumes of the Musnad Ahmad ibn Hanbal in English
- Author: Ahmad ibn Hanbal
- Language: Arabic
- Genre: Hadith collection
- Publication place: Abbasid caliphate

Musnad Ahmad ibn Hanbal (Arabic: مسند أحمد بن حنبل) is the third largest collection of musnad hadith, containing over 30,000 Hadiths. It was compiled by the Islamic scholar Ahmad ibn Hanbal (d. AH 241/AD 855) to whom the Hanbali fiqh (legislation) is attributed.

== Description ==
Musnad Ahmad, also known as Al-Musnad, is one of the most famous and comprehensive books of hadith, which occupies an advanced position among the Sunnis as it is considered one of the main sources of hadith. It is the most famous of the Musnads, and the hadith scholars have placed it after the Kutub al-Sittah. It contains approximately 40 thousand hadiths of the Prophet, of which approximately 10 thousand are repeated

It is arranged according to the names of the companions who narrated the hadiths, as he arranged it by placing the narrations of each companion. The number of companions who have chains of transmission are approximately 900. He divided the book into eighteen chains of transmission, the first of which is the chain of transmission of the ten who were promised Paradise and the last of which is the chain of transmission of women. It contains many authentic hadiths that are not found in the two Sahihs.

He said about his Musnad in the introduction: “I made this book an imam, if people differ about the Sunnah of the Messenger of God, may God bless him and grant him peace, they would refer to it.”.

It is said by some that Ahmad ibn Hanbal made a comment in regard to his book which reads as follows: "I have only included a hadith in this book if it had been used as evidence by some of the scholars." Abu al-Faraj Ibn al-Jawzi ironically claimed that the Musnad contains hadiths that are fabricated by interpolation (i.e. the narrator jumbling up information, mixing texts and authoritative chains), which were said to be nine Hadiths by some, or fifteen hadiths by others. However, it is agreed that the hadith that are suspected to be fabricated are not new hadiths that are creations of a dubious narrator's imagination.

=== Time of Writing ===
Historians differ about when Ibn Hanbal began composing the Musnad. Some of them believe that he began collecting hadith at the age of sixteen when he began studying hadith in the year 180 AH. Abu Musa al-Madini believed that he began classifying the Musnad when he returned from Abd al-Razzaq al-San'ani from Yemen in the year 200 AH when he was thirty six years old but it is more likely that he classified his musnad after the ordeal of the creation of the Quran (220 AH), because Ibn Hanbal did not narrate in his Musnad about those who fell into the ordeal.

== Books and works about the Musnad ==
=== Books about the Musnad ===
- Characteristics of Musnad of Imam Ahmed by Abu Musa Al-Madani
- al-Qawl al-musaddad fi Musnad Ahmed by Ibn Hajar al-Asqalani
- Al-Muṣ'ad al-Aḥmad fī Khatm Musnad al-Imām Ahmed by Ibn al-Jazari

=== Explanations ===
- Sharḥ wa Takhrīj al-Musnad by Ahmad Muhammad Shakir
- Nafthāt Ṣadr al-Mukmad wa Qurrat ‘Ayn al-Masaad by Al-Saffarini
- ‘Aqūd al-Zabarjad ‘ala Musnad Aḥmad by Al-Suyuti

== Publications ==
The book has been published by many organizations around the world, including:

- Musnad Imam Ahmad Bin Muhammad Bin Hanbal: Published: Noor Foundation USA
- English Translation Of Musnad Imam Ahmad Bin Hanbal (4 Vols) : Published: Darussalam
- English Translation Of Musnad Imam Ahmad Bin Hanbal (5 Vols) : Published: Darussalam

== See also ==
- List of Sunni books
- Sahih Muslim
- Jami al-Tirmidhi
- Sunan Abu Dawood
- Sunan ibn Majah
- Muwatta Malik
- Majma al-Zawa'id
