= Ibn al-Salah =

13th-century Kurdish Islamic scholar

Ibn Aṣ-Ṣalāḥ
- Title: "the Shaykh of the Shafi'i scholars."

Personal life
- Born: 577 AH (1181/1182 CE)
- Died: 1245 (aged 63–64)
- Main interest(s): Tafsir; Hadith; Shafi'i Fiqh
- Notable work: Introduction to the Science of Hadith

Religious life
- Religion: Islam
- Denomination: Sunni
- Jurisprudence: Shafi'i
- Creed: Ash'ari

Muslim leader
- Influenced by: Al-Shafi'i Abu al-Hasan al-Ash'ari Ibn Asakir Ibn Dihya al-Kalby
- Influenced: Ibn Khallikan

Abū ‘Amr ‘Uthmān ibn ‘Abd il-Raḥmān Ṣalāḥ al-Dīn al-Kurdī al-Shahrazūrī (Arabic: أبو عمر عثمان بن عبد الرحمن صلاح الدين الكرديّ الشهرزوريّ) (c. 1181 CE/577 AH – 1245/643), commonly known as Ibn al-Ṣalāḥ, was a Kurdish Shafi'i hadith specialist and the author of the seminal Introduction to the Science of Hadith. He was born in the village of Sharazoor in Suleymaniyyah, raised in Mosul, and lived in Damascus where he died.

== Early life ==
=== Birth ===
Ibn al-Ṣalāḥ was born in the year 1181 CE/577 AH in Sharazoor.

=== Education ===
He first studied fiqh with his father in Sharazoor, located in the south-eastern part of what is currently referred to as Iraqi Kurdistan. He then occupied himself in Mosul for an unknown period of time, studying under a number of local religious scholars. He studied in a number of cities, including: Baghdad, Hamedan, Naysabur, Merv, Aleppo, Damascus and Harran.

Ibn Khallikan said that he had heard that Ibn al-Ṣalāḥ had repeatedly read al-Muhathab, one of the primary texts of the Shafi'i Madh'hab, "before his mustache had grown." He read Sahih al-Bukhari upon two of his teachers, al-Mayyad ibn Muhammad al-Tusi and Mansur ibn 'Abd al-Mun'im al-Furawi, as well as Al-Sunan al-Kubra, by al-Bayhaqi, upon the latter.

== Scholarly career ==
al-Dhahabi described Ibn al-Ṣalāh as "the shaikh of the Shafi'i scholars."

=== Scholastic specialization ===
While Ibn al-Ṣalāḥ was most recognized for his contribution to the field of hadith, he was well-grounded in a variety of disciplines. Ibn Khallikan described him as being from amongst the exemplary scholars of Quranic exegesis, hadith and jurisprudence, participating in a number of religious disciplines and producing sound religious verdicts. Al-Fasi described him as being "a master in both jurisprudence and hadith, and other than that." He was also described by al-Dhahabi as "strong in the Arabic Language" and as "the shaikh of the Shafi'i scholars." Ibn al-Hajib described Ibn al-Salah as being broad in his knowledge of both primary issues (al-usul) and peripheral (al-furu`).

=== Positions ===
Ibn al-Ṣalāḥ held several positions throughout his life, primarily in the field of education. He taught at the Salahiyyah School in Jerusalem, and then, following the destruction of its city walls, moved to Damascus and taught at the Rawahiyyah School for some time following its inception. Following the foundation of Dar al-Hadith Ashrafiyyah, he became its shaikh and was the first to teach and give verdicts there in the year 530 AH. It was here that he dictated his work Introduction to the Science of Hadith to his students. He was then appointed a teacher at the al-Shamiyyah al-Sughara School.

=== Students ===
Ibn al-Salah had a number of students, some of whom achieved prominence in their own right; from them:

- Ibn Khallikan
- Ibn Razin
- Kamal Ishaq
- Kamal Salar
- Shams al-Din `Abd al-Rahman Nuh al-Maqdisi
- Shihab al-Din Abu Shamah

== Death ==
Ibn al-Ṣalāḥ died on Monday, September 18, 1245 CE/643 AH, at the age of 66. His funeral prayer was performed at the congregational mosque of Damascus to a crowd so large it required a second prayer to accommodate. He was buried in the Sufiyyah graveyard, now the location of a hospital, a mosque, and other buildings.

== Theological position ==
Ibn al-Salah adhered to the Ash'ari school. In his commentary on al-Ghazali's al-Wasit, Ibn al-Salah maintained that the study of kalam is not individually obligatory (fard 'ayn) for every Muslim. However, he qualified this by stating that if a person's theological doubts cannot be removed except through kalam, then studying it becomes obligatory for that individual.

Elsewhere, Ibn al-Salah discussed the role of theological discourse in answering questions of creed. He held that when a theological question could be addressed without causing harm, a detailed response was permissible if a brief answer would be insufficient for proper understanding. He limited this to cases involving sincere seekers of guidance rather than those motivated by disputation or controversy. In doing so, Ibn al-Salah recognized the role of qualified theologians (mutakallimūn) in defending orthodox belief, resolving theological doubts, and providing reasoned explanations when required, thereby implying the necessity of their existence as a communal obligation (farḍ kifāyah) for the preservation and defence of Sunni doctrine. He likewise interpreted reports from the Salaf discouraging theological discussion as applying primarily to discussions liable to produce confusion, sectarianism, or fruitless debate.

Ibn al-Ṣalāḥ clarified his position on philosophy, describing it as: "The basis of foolishness and degeneration, a topic of confusion and misguidance which is motivated by perversion and blasphemy. Whosoever engages in philosophy, has been blinded in his insight into the great aspects of the Sharia corroborated by evidences." Due to his insistence no one was allowed to read the subject of philosophy in Damascus, a matter which the leaders supported.

== Works ==
Ibn al-Salah had a number of works the most notable named below in addition to others on individual issues.

1. Introduction to the Science of Hadith – perhaps his best known work;
2. Ishkalat 'ala al-Wasit, also called Mushkil al-Wasit – which comprised brief comments on various subjects primarily in the first fourth of al-Wasit in Shafi'i fiqh which appeared in a large, single volume
3. Al-Amaali – the transcription of the hadith he read aloud to his students, complete with the chains of narration;
4. Siyanah Sahih Muslim – an explanation of Sahih Muslim of which only the beginning segment is published which al-Nawawi referred to in his own explanation
5. Numerous fatawa, or religious rulings, described by Abu Shahbah as having "much benefit"
6. Fawa`id, or benefits, from his travels which consisted of a number of volumes of unusual points of interest in various disciplines which he collected during his travels to Khurasan
7. Adab al-Mufti wa al-Mustafti—The Etiquette of the One Giving a Verdict and of the One Seeking a Verdict
8. Nukat `Ala al-Muhadhdhab
9. Tabaqat al-Fuqaha al-Shafi`iyyah a collection of lesser known Shafi`i scholars of jurisprudence which al-Nawawi abridged and added to. Ibn al-Salah died before completing this work.

== See also ==
- Introduction to the Science of Hadith
- English translation of Introduction to the Science of Hadith
- List of Ash'aris
- List of Kurdish scholars
