= Hadith sciences =

Religious study of the sayings of Muhammad

Hadith sciences (Arabic: علم الحديث ʻilm al-ḥadīth "science of hadith") (Note: The plural form of hadith in arabic is ʼaḥādīth, أحاديث, but to avoid confusion among English speakers, "hadith" will be used for both singular and plural forms of the word in this article.) consists of several religious scholarly disciplines used by Muslim scholars in the study and evaluation of the hadith. ("Science" is used in the sense of a field of study, not to be confused with following the principles of observation and experiment, developing falsifiable hypotheses, etc. of modern science.) The hadith are what most Muslims believe to be a record of the words, actions, and the silent approval of the Islamic prophet Muhammad as transmitted through chains of narrators. Hadith sciences scholars have aim to determine which of these records are authentic, and which may be fabricated.

For most Muslims, determining authenticity of hadith is enormously important in Islam because along with the Quran, the Sunnah of the Islamic prophet—his words, actions, and the silent approval—are considered the explanation of the divine revelation (wahy), and the record of them (i.e. hadith) provides the basis of Islamic law (Sharia). In addition, while the number of verses pertaining to law in the Quran is relatively few, hadith, for many, give direction on everything from details of religious obligations (such as Ghusl or Wudu, ablutions for salat prayer), to the correct forms of salutations, and the importance of benevolence to slaves. Thus the "great bulk" of the rules of Islamic law are derived from hadith, along with the Quran as a primary source. (Note: “The full systems of Islamic theology and law are not derived primarily from the Quran. Muhammad’s sunna was a second but far more detailed living scripture, and later Muslim scholars would thus often refer to the Prophet as `The Possessor of Two Revelations`”)

There are three primary ways to determine the authenticity (sihha) of a hadith: by attempting to determine whether there are "other identical reports from other transmitters"; determining the reliability of the transmitters of the report; and "the continuity of the chain of transmission" of the hadith.

Traditional hadith sciences has been praised by some as "unrivaled, the ultimate in historical criticism", and heavily criticized for failing to filter out a massive amount of hadith "which cannot possibly be authentic". However, both Muslims and western scholars have criticised the hadith. Quranists reject the authority of the hadiths, viewing them as un-Quranic; some further claim that most hadiths are fabrications (pseudepigrapha) created in the 8th and 9th century AD, and which are falsely attributed to Muhammad. Many Western scholars consider that few or no hadith can be confidently considered to be the authentic words of Muhammad, and that traditional attempts to determine the authenticity of hadith are flawed due to the potential for the chain of narrators (particularly the earliest parts) to have been fabricated.

== Definition ==
The science of hadith has been described by one hadith specialist, Jalal al-Din al-Suyuti (d. 911 A.H/ 1505 C.E), as the science of the principles by which the conditions of both the sanad (the chain of narration), and the matn (the text of the hadith), are known. This science is concerned with the sanad and the matn with its objective being distinguishing the sahih, authentic, from other than it. Ibn Hajar al-Asqalani said the preferred definition is: knowledge of the principles by which the condition of the narrator and the narrated are determined.

== History ==
After the death of Muhammad, his sayings were transmitted orally. According to Islamic tradition, Umar ibn al-Khattab, the second caliph, started the process of collecting all the hadiths together into one unified volume, but gave up the endeavor "for fear the Quran would be neglected by the Muslims" (according to Muhammad Zubayr Siddiqi).

The Umayyad caliph, Umar ibn Abd al-Aziz (aka Umar II, who reigned from 717-720 CE) also started an effort to collect all the hadiths. Teaching and collecting hadiths was part of a plan of his to renew the moral fiber of the Muslim community. He supported teachers of fiqh, sent educators to Bedouin tribes, ordered weekly hadith lectures in the Hejaz, and sent out scholars of hadith to Egypt and North Africa, (according to Muhammad Zubayr Siddiqi).

Umar also ordered the great scholar of Madinah, Abu Bakr ibn Hazm to write down all the hadiths of Muhammad and Umar ibn al-Khattab, particularly those narrated by Aisha. He had these hadiths collected in books which were circulated around the Umayyad Empire. Although these books are lost today, commentaries on them by Ibn al-Nadim reveals that they are organized like books of fiqh, such as the Muwatta of Imam Malik, the first large compilation of hadiths. Imam Malik himself probably followed the general plan of the early books of hadith ordered by Umar.

Hadith sciences developed in part because forgery "took place on a massive scale", with perhaps the most famous collector of hadith and practitioner of ʻilm al-ḥadīth—Muhammad al-Bukhari—sifting through nearly 600,000, over 16 years before eliminating all but approximately 7400 hadith. (Note: both tallies of hadith include different versions of the same report and repetitions of the same report (matn) with different isnad, i.e. chains of transmitters).)

Traditional accounts describe "the systematic study of hadith" as being motivated by the altruism of "pious scholars" seeking to correct this problem. Some scholars (Daniel W. Brown, A. Kevin Reinhart) shed doubt on this. Brown believes the theory "fails" to adequately account "for the atmosphere of conflict" of at least early hadith criticism. The "method of choice" of partisans seeking to discredit opposing schools of Islamic law was to discredit the authorities (transmitters) of their opponent's hadith—to "tear apart" their isnads". (To do this required developing biographical evaluations of hadith transmitters—ʿilm al-rijāl and ilm jarh wa ta’dil). Reinhart finds descriptions of famous companions of Muhammad in Ibn Sa'd's Kitāb aṭ-ṭabaqāt al-kabīr "recording hadith and transmitting it, asking each other about precedents, and reproaching those who disregarded this authentic religious knowledge" in suspicious conformity to the "mythology of the pristine early community".

As the criteria for judging authenticity grew into the six major collections of ṣaḥīḥ (sound) hadith (Kutub al-Sittah) in the third century, the science of hadith was described as having become a "mature system", or to have entered its "final stage".

The classification of Hadith into

- sahih, sound or authentic;
- hasan, good;
- da'if, weak,
- (another rating is mawḍūʿ, fabricated).

was utilized early in hadith scholarship by Ali ibn al-Madini (161–234 AH). Later, al-Madini's student Muhammad al-Bukhari (810–870) authored a collection, now known as Sahih Bukhari, commonly accepted by Sunni scholars to be the most authentic collection of hadith, followed by that of his student Muslim ibn al-Hajjaj. Al-Bukhari's methods of testing hadiths and isnads are seen as exemplary of the developing methodology of hadith scholarship.

== Evaluating authenticity ==
An elaborate system was developed by scholars of hadith to determine the authenticity of traditions based on "two premises":

1. that the authenticity of a hadith report is "best measured by the reliability of the transmitters" (known as rāwī pl. ruwāt) of the report;
2. consequently, "carefully scrutinizing" the "individual transmitters" of the hadith (ilm jarh wa ta’dil; ʿilm al-rijāl) and "the continuity of their chains of transmission" is the best way to measure hadith reliability.

A basic element of hadith sciences consist of a careful examination of the chain of transmission (sanad سند, also isnād اسناد, or silsila سِلْسِلَة), relaying each hadith from the Prophet to the person who compiles the hadith. The isnād and the commentary are distinct from the matn (متن), which is the main body, or text, of the hadith, These two terms are the primary components of every hadith.

According to the person most responsible for elevation of the importance of hadith in Islamic law, Imam Al-Shafi‘i,

"In most cases the truthfulness or lack of truthfulness of a tradition can only be known through the truthfulness or lack of truthfulness of the transmitter, except in a few special cases when he relates what cannot possibly be the case, or what is contradicted by better-authenticated information."

The first people who received hadith were Muhammad's "Companions" (Sahaba), who are believed to have understood and preserved it. They conveyed it to those after them as they were commanded; then the generation following them, the "Followers" (Tabi‘un), received it and then conveyed it to those after them, and so on. Thus, the Companion would say, “I heard the Prophet say such and such.” The Follower would say, “I heard a Companion say, ‘I heard the Prophet say’” The one after the Follower would say, “I heard a Follower say, ‘I heard a Companion say, ‘I heard the Prophet say’” and so on.

=== Criteria to be a ṣaḥīḥ hadith ===
To be 'ṣaḥīḥ ("sound") hadith, an isolated hadith (Mutawatir hadith were exempt from these tests) "must pass five tests":

1. "continuity of transmission";
2. ʿadāla of transmitters, i.e. transmitters must be of good character;
3. "accuracy (ḍabṭ) of the process of transmission, i.e. narrators must not be prone to carelessness or known to have poor memories";
4. absence of "irregularities" (shadhūdh), i.e. hadith must not contradict a "more reliable source";
5. "absence of corrupting defects(ʿilla qādiḥa), i.e. inaccuracies in reporting the actual chain of transmission."

=== Biographical evaluation ===
An important discipline within hadith sciences is biographical evaluation, the study of transmitters of hadith, ʿilm al-rijāl, (literally "science of men") mentioned above. These are the narrators who make up the sanad. Ilm ar-rijal is based on certain verses of the Quran.

Transmitters are studied and rated for their "general capacity" (ḍābit; itqān) and their moral character (ʿadāla).

1. General capacity is measured by qualities such as memory, linguistic ability. Transmitters that have good memories and linguistic ability "might be considered competent (ḍābit)".
2. ʿadāla transmitters must be "adult Muslims, fully in control of their mental faculties, aware of their moral responsibilities, free from guilt for major sins, and not prone to minor sins". Examples of ratings of transmitters include "trustworthy" or thiqa for ones that possess both ʿadāla and ḍābit. Transmitters that are ʿadāla but show signs of carelessness are rated honest or ṣudūq. The result of this study were "vast biographical dictionaries" to check against the isnads of individual hadith.

Not all transmitters were evaluated for these characteristics and rated. Companions of the prophet (ṣaḥāba) were traditionally considered to possess collective moral turpitude or taʿdīl, by virtue of their exposure to the Prophet, so that they all possessed ʿadāla without needing to be evaluated. (This quality was similar to that of Prophetic infallibility (ʿiṣma) but of course lower in level.)

1. The history of the narrators must include four things:
  1. Their Isma-ul-Rijjal (biographies)
  2. Their kunniyaat (nicknames)
  3. Their place of settlement
  4. Their date of birth and date of death (to verify whether this person met the people whom he narrated from)

=== Traditional importance of the sanad ===
The second criteria after judging the general ability and moral probity of the transmitters, is the "continuity" of the chain of transmission of the hadith. The transmitters must be shown to have received the accounts of the prophet "in an acceptable manner from the preceding authority in the chain".

Transmitters must have lived during the same period, they must have had the opportunity to meet, and they must have reached sufficient age at the time of transmission to guarantee their capacity to transmit.

Early religious scholars stressed the importance of the sanad. For example, according to an early Quranic exegete, Matr al-Warraq, the verse from the Quran, “Or a remnant of knowledge,” refers to the isnad of a hadith.

In addition, Abd Allah ibn al-Mubarak said, “The isnad is from the religion; were it not for the isnad anyone could say anything they wanted.” According to Ibn al-Salah, the sanad originated within the Muslim scholastic community and remains unique to it. Ibn Hazm said that the connected, continuous sanad is particular to the religion of Islam: the sanad was also used by the Jewish community, but they had a break of more than 30 generations between them and Moses, and the Christians limited their use of the sanad to the prohibition of divorce. Ibn Taymiyyah also said that the knowledge of isnad is particular to the followers of Prophet Muhammad.

The practice of paying particular attention to the sanad can be traced to the generation following that of the Companions, based upon the statement of Muhammad Ibn Sirin: “They did not previously inquire about the sanad. However, after the turmoil occurred they would say, ‘Name for us your narrators.’ So the people of the Sunnah would have their hadith accepted and the people of innovation would not.” Those who were not given to require a sanad were, in the stronger of two opinions, the Companions of the Prophet, while others, such as al-Qurtubi, include the older of the Followers as well.

Al-Khatib al-Baghdadi, stating likewise, cited various evidences for this, from them, the Quranic verse, “And you were the best nation brought about to mankind.” The fitnah referred to is the conflicting ideologies of the Kharijites and the Ghulat that had emerged at the time of the third Caliph Uthman ibn Affan, his assassination and the social unrest of the Kharijites in opposition to the succeeding rulers, Ali and Muawiyah. The death of Uthman was in the year 35 after the migration.

=== The matn ===
According to scholar Daniel Brown, in traditional hadith sciences, "the possibility" of criticizing the matn as well as the isnad "was recognized in theory, but the option was seldom systematically exercised".

Syrian hadith scholar Salah al-Din al-Idlibi is an expert in the relatively new field of matn criticism. Whereas traditional criticism has focused on verifying the trustworthiness of the people transmitting the hadith, matn criticism studies the contents of the hadith and compares this with the contents of other hadiths and any other available historical evidence with the aim of arriving at an objective historical reality of the event described by the hadith.

== Sunni literature for hadith sciences ==
As in any Islamic discipline, there is a rich history of literature describing the principles and fine points of hadith sciences. Ibn Hajar al-Asqalani provides a summation of this development with the following: “Works authored in the terminology of the people of hadith have become plentiful from the Imaams both old and contemporary:

1. From the first of those who authored a work on this subject is the Judge, Abū Muḥammad al-Rāmahurmuzī in his book, ‘al-Muhaddith al-Faasil,’ however, it was not comprehensive.
2. And al-Hakim, Abu Abd Allah an-Naysaburi, however, it was neither refined nor well arranged.
3. And following him, Abu Nu’aym al-Asbahani, who wrote a mustakhraj upon the book of the later, (compiling the same narrations al-Hakim cited using his own sanads.) However, some things remain in need of correction.
4. And then came al-Khatib Abu Bakr al-Bagdadi, authoring works in the various disciplines of hadith studies a book entitled al-Kifaayah and in its etiquettes a book entitled al-Jami’ Li Adab ash-Sheikh wa as-Saami. Scarce is the discipline from the disciplines of the science of hadeeth that he has not written an individual book regarding, as al-Hafith Abu Bakr ibn Nuqtah said: 'Every objective person knows that the scholars of hadeeth coming after al-Khatib are indebted to his works.' After them came others, following al-Khatib, taking their share from this science."
5. al-Qadi ‘Eyaad compiled a concise book naming it al-Ilmaa’.
6. Abu Hafs al-Mayanajiy a work giving it the title Ma Laa yasu al-Muhaddith Jahluhu or That Which a Hadith Scholar is Not Allowed Ignorance Of. There are numerous examples of this which have gained popularity and were expanded upon seeking to make plentiful the knowledge relating to these books and others abridged making easy their understanding.
7. This was prior to the coming of the memorizer and jurist Taqiyy ad-Deen Aboo ‘Amrin ‘Uthmaan ibn al-Salah ‘Abd ar-Rahmaan ash-Shahruzuuree, who settled in Damascus. He gathered, at the time he had become a teacher of hadith at the Ashrafiyyah school, his well known book, editing the various disciplines mentioned in it. He dictated it piecemeal and, as a result, did not succeed in providing it with an appropriate order. He occupied himself with the various works of al-Khatib, gathering his assorted studies, adding to them from other sources the essence of their benefits. So he combined in his book what had been spread throughout books other than it. It is due to this that people have focused their attention upon it, following its example. Innumerable are those who rendered his book into poetry, abridged it, sought to complete what had been left out of it or left out any extraneous information; as well as those who opposed him in some aspect of his work or supported him.

== Discussion of validity ==
The science of hadith has not been without critics. According to Muhammad Husayn Haykal, "despite the great care and precision of the Hadith scholars, much of what they regarded as true was later proved to be spurious." He goes on to quote Al-Nawawi (1233–1277), who stated that "a number of scholars discovered many hadiths" in the two most authentic hadith collection Sahih al-Bukhari and Sahih Muslim "which do not fulfill the conditions of verification assumed by these men" (i.e. by the hadith collectors Muhammad al-Bukhari and Muslim ibn al-Hajjaj).

Among the criticisms made (of non-sahih as well as sahih hadith) of is that there was a suspiciously large growth in their number with each generation in the early years of Islam; (Note: According to Ibn Rawandi, "the danger inherent in this criticism is that it leads Muslims who accept it to the fatally dangerous conclusion that the body of Hadith is not the sayings of the Prophet and therefore does not carry his authority: [quoting Hossein Nasr] 'In this way one of the foundations of divine law and a vital source of guidance for the spiritual life is destroyed. It is as if the whole foundation were pulled from underneath the structure of Islam'".) that large numbers of hadith contradicted each other; and that the genre's status as a primary source of Islamic law motivated the creation of fraudulent hadith.

Modern Western scholars in particular have "seriously questioned the historicity and authenticity of the hadith", according to John Esposito, maintaining that "the bulk of traditions attributed to the Prophet Muhammad were actually written much later." According to Esposito, Schacht "found no evidence of legal traditions before 722," from which Schacht concluded that "the Sunna of the Prophet is not the words and deeds of the Prophet, but apocryphal material" dating from later.

Henry Preserved Smith and Ignác Goldziher also challenged the reliability of the hadith, Smith stating that "forgery or invention of traditions began very early" and "many traditions, even if well authenticated to external appearance, bear internal evidence of forgery." (Note: "In truth the Hadith must be regarded with marked scepticism, so far as it is used as a source for the life of Mohammed. The forgery or invention of traditions began very early. The Companions were not always too scrupulous to clothe their own opinions in the form of anecdotes ... These natural tendencies were magnified by the party spirit which early became rife in Islam. Each party counted among its adherents immediate followers of Mohammed. Each was anxious to justify itself by an appeal to his words and deeds. It is only the natural result that traditions with a notoriously party bias were circulated at an early day. A traditionist of the first rank admits that pious men were inclined to no sort of fraud so much as to the invention of traditions ... From our point of view, therefore, many traditions, even if well authenticated to external appearance, bear internal evidence of forgery.") Goldziher writes that "European critics hold that only a very small part of the ḥadith can be regarded as an actual record of Islam during the time of Mohammed and his immediate followers." (Note: "... European critics hold that only a very small part of the ḥadith can be regarded as an actual record of Islam during the time of Mohammed and his immediate followers. It is rather a succession of testimonies, often self contradictory, as to the aims, currents of thought, opinions, and decisions which came into existence during the first two centuries of the growth of Islam. In order to give them greater authority they are referred to the prophet and his companions. The study of the ḥadith is consequently of the greater importance because it discloses the successive stages and controlling ideas in the growth of the religious system of Islam.") In his Mohammedan Studies, Goldziher states: "it is not surprising that, among the hotly debated controversial issues of Islam, whether political or doctrinal, there is not one in which the champions of the various views are unable to cite a number of traditions, all equipped with imposing isnads".

Patricia Crone noted that early traditionalists were still developing conventions of examining the chain of narration (isnads) that by later standards were sketchy/deficient, even though they were closer to the historical material. Later though they possessed impeccable chains, but were more likely to be fabricated. Reza Aslan quotes Schacht's maxim: `the more perfect the isnad, the later the tradition`, which he (Aslan) calls "whimsical but accurate".

== See also ==
- Categories of Hadith
- Hadith terminology
- Introduction to the Science of Hadith
- Kutub al-Sittah
- Criticism of hadith
