= Abu Ishaq al-Shirazi =

Persian Shafi'i-Ash'ari scholar

Imam Abū Isḥāq al-Shīrāzī أبو إسحاق الشيرازي
- Title: Amir al-Mu'minin fī al-Fiqh; Shaykh al-Islam

Personal life
- Born: 1003 Firuzabad
- Died: 1083 (aged 79–80) Baghdad
- Era: Islamic Golden Age
- Main interest(s): Fiqh (Islamic jurisprudence), Usul al-Fiqh (principles of jurisprudence), Usul al-Din, 'Aqidah, Tawhid, Kalam (Islamic theology), Hadith studies
- Notable works: Al-Tanbih fi al-Fiqh al-Shafi'i; Al-Muhadhdhab fi Fiqh al-Imam al-Shafi'i; Al-Luma' fi Usul al-Fiqh; Al-Ishara ila Madhhab Ahl al-Haqq; Tabaqat al-Fuqaha; Al-Nukat fi al-Masa'il al-Mukhtalaf fiha bayna al-Shafi'i wa Abi Hanifa

Religious life
- Religion: Islam
- Denomination: Sunni
- Jurisprudence: Shafi'i
- Creed: Ash'ari

Muslim leader
- Successor: Abu Sa'd al-Mutwalli
- Disciples: Ibn 'Aqil Al-Khatib al-Baghdadi Al-Hariri of Basra Abu al-Walid al-Baji
- Influenced by: Al-Shafi'i Abu al-Hasan al-Ash'ari Abu Ishaq al-Isfarayini Abu al-Tayyib al-Tabari
- Influenced: Abu Sa'd al-Sam'ani Al-Nawawi Ibn al-Rif'ah Taj al-Din al-Subki Ibrahim al-Bajuri 'Ali Jum'a

Abū Isḥāq Ibrāhīm ibn ʿAlī al-Shīrāzī (Arabic: أبو إسحاق الشيرازي; 1003–1083) was a prominent Persian jurisconsult, legal theoretician, theologian, debater and muhaqqiq (researcher). He was one of the leading scholars of Shafiʿi jurisprudence in the eleventh century and arguably the most prolific writer of Islamic legal literature.

He became the second teacher after succeeding Ibn al-Sabbagh at the Nizamiyya of Baghdad, which was built in his honour by the vizier (minister) of the Seljuk Empire Nizam al-Mulk.

He acquired the status of a mujtahid in the field of fiqh and usul al-fiqh. The contemporary muhaddithun (hadith specialists) also considered him as their Imam. Likewise, he was respected and enjoyed a high status among the mutakallimun (practitioners of kalam) and Sufis.

He was closely associated with the eminent Sufis of his time like Abu Nasr ibn al-Qushayri (d. 514/1120), the son of al-Qushayri (d. 465/1072).

Abu Bakr al-Shashi said: "Abu Ishaq is Allah's proof on the leading scholars of the time." Al-Muwaffaq al-Hanafi said: "Abu Ishaq is the Amir al-Mu'minin (Prince of the Believers) from among the fuqaha' (jurists)." The Azhari scholar 'Ali Jum'a, an inheritor of al-Bajuri's teachings, calls him the "shaykh of the fuqaha' of his era."

== Name ==
He is Shaykh al-Islam, Abu Ishaq Ibrahim b. 'Ali b. Yusuf al-Fayruzabadi al-Shirazi.

== Early life ==
=== Birth ===
He was born in 393 A.H/1003 A.D in Firuzabad in Persia, a town at a distance of about 35 miles from Shiraz.

=== Teachers ===
He studied under various Shafi'i masters in Shiraz and Basra before coming to Baghdad. In Shiraz, he studied under Abu 'Abd Allah al-Baydawi and 'Abd al-Wahhab ibn Ramin. In Basrah, he had al-Kharzi for master. In 415 AH (1024–1025 AD), he entered Baghdad to study under Abu al-Tayyib al-Tabari the foremost Shafi'i jurist of his time. Abu Ishaq became one of his closest companions. He would repeat his lessons and succeed him in his council. He studied hadith from Abu Bakr al-Barqani, Abu Ali bin Shazan and others, and he studied kalam under Abu Hatim al-Qazwini, a student of al-Baqillani. He continued his diligence, toil, and effort until his fame spread throughout the countries and he became the most admired people of his time.

== Scholarly life ==
=== Position ===
Upon his graduation from his mentors. He remained most of his lifetime in Baghdad and showcased his skills and intelligence in sacred law replacing himself as the mufti of the Muslim Ummah (Islamic community) in his time. This where Abu Ishaq was appointed to become the professor of the Nizamiyya of Baghdad at the order of vizier Nizam al-Mulk to accommodate many of Abu Ishaq's students. He was known as the mentor of Shafi'is in Iraq at his time. Once, after travelling from Baghdad to Nishapur, Abu Ishaq is said to have had many students.

=== Fighting against immorality ===
The chief of the Hanbali faction, Abu Ja'far, and the chief of the Shafi'i faction, Abu Ishaq, joined forces for a common cause and battled against the rise of immorality, which was thought to be the cause of the great flood in 467/1071. Energised by their shaykhs, the Hanbalis assembled in the al-Qasr mosque and invited Abu Ishaq and his followers to fight alongside them against prostitution, interest charges, and wine-drinking. The two Shaykhs demanded al-Qa'im, the caliph, to demolish the brothels and eradicate the other customs practiced by the locals. A letter advising the Seljuk Sultan of this demand was also dispatched at the same time.

=== Students ===
He had many students, the most famous of whom are: Al-Khatib al-Baghdadi, al-Hariri of Basra, Ibn 'Aqil, Abu al-Walid al-Baji, Fakhr al-Islam Abu Bakr al-Shashi al-Qaffal (d. 507/1113), and Abu al-Qasim ibn al-Samarqandi al-Dimashqi (d. 536/1142).

== Death ==
He died in Baghdad in 476 AH (1083–1084 AD), and the 'Abbasid caliph al-Muqtadi (d. 487/1094) attended his funeral. On his death, his pupils sat in solemn mourning in the Nizamiyya, and after that ceremony, Mu'ayyid al-Mulk, son of Nizam al-Mulk, appointed Abu Sa'd al-Mutwalli to the vacant place, but when Nizām al-Mulk heard of it, he wrote to disapprove of that nomination, adding that the college should be shut up during a year, on account of Abu Ishaq's death; he then blamed the person who had undertaken to fill his place, and ordered the sheikh Abu Nasr ibn al-Sabbagh to profess in his stead.

== Creed ==
Abu Ishaq was a staunch Ash'arite who defended and propagated the doctrine in his book called Al-Ishara ila Madhhab Ahl al-Haqq. Ibn al-Subki quotes Abu Ishaq in his Tabaqat al-Shafi'iyya al-Kubra stating:

“Indeed, the Ashʿarīs are the people of the Sunnah and the defenders of the Sharia, who rose up to respond to the innovators from the Qadariyah, the Rafida and others so whoever attacks them has attacked the Sunnis and when a matter involving criticism of Ashʿarīs is brought to the attention of those responsible for Muslim affairs, it is obligatory for them to discipline the individual in a manner that deters everyone.”

=== Dispute ===
Following the arrival of Ibn al-Qushayri (son of al-Qushayri) in 469/1076 to teach at the Nizamiyya there had been a series of religious riots in Baghdad in 469–70/1076–77 between Hanbalis and Shafi'is. Ibn al-Qushayri denigrated the Hanbalis when he was there, accusing them of anthropomorphism in their discourse with Allah. Leading Nizamiyya scholar Abu Ishaq al-Shirazi backed Ibn al-Qushayri. He wrote to Nizam al-Mulk, complaining about the Hanbalis and requesting assistance. Eventually, Abu Ishaq al-Shirazi succeeded in getting Abu Ja'far Ibn Abi Musa arrested.

== Reception ==
- Al-Mawardi said: “I have never seen anyone like Abu Ishaq! If al-Shafi'i had seen him, he would have been proud of him.”
- Ibn al-Sam'ani said: “Sheikh Abu Ishaq was the Imam of the Shafi’i school of thought (of his time) and the teacher in Baghdad in the Nizamiyya school of thought, the sheikh of the age, and the Imam of the era. People travelled to him from all countries and came to him from all regions, and he used to follow the path of Abu al-Abbas Ibn Surayj.”
- Ibn Aqil said: “I saw our Sheikh Abu Ishaq not giving anything to a poor person without bringing the intention, and he would not speak about an issue without seeking refuge with God Almighty, and sincerely intending to support the truth, and he did not write anything except after he had prayed rak’ahs, so there is no crime whose name became widespread and whose writings became famous in the East and the West with the blessing of his sincerity.”

== Works ==
He authored many works, among the most famous of them are:

- Al-Tanbih fi al-Fiqh al-Shafi'i (Arabic: التنبيه في الفقه الشافعي, lit. 'The Notification: in Shafi'i Jurisprudence'), one of the five most important books in Shafi'i jurisprudence, played a prominent role in the development of the Shafi'i school. Al-Nawawi wrote a commentary on it called Tashih al-Tanbih, as well as two other commentaries by Ibn al-Rif'ah (d. 710/1310) and al-Zarkashi (d. 794/1392).
- Al-Muhadhdhab fi Fiqh al-Imam al-Shafi'i (Arabic: المهذب في فقه الإمام الشافعي, lit. 'The Rarefaction: on the Jurisprudence of Imam al-Shafi'i'), a comprehensive manual of Islamic law according to the Shafi'i school, which took him fourteen years to produce, and which was later on explained by the Shafi'i hadith scholar al-Nawawi naming it al-Majmū' Sharh al-Muhadhdhab (Arabic: المجموع شرح المهذب, lit. 'The Compendium: An Exegesis of the Rarefaction'), was a recension and compilation of all the strands of Shafi'i jurisprudence.

These two works are counted among the five key reference texts for the Shafi'i school, and the Muhadhdhab was considered by al-Nawawi to be one of the two most important works of this school ever produced.

- Al-Luma' fi Usul al-Fiqh (Arabic: اللمع فى أصول الفقه, lit. 'The Refulgence of the Principles of Islamic Jurisprudence'), one of the earliest works in relation to Usul al-Fiqh specifically in the Shafi'i school of jurisprudence. This work was contemporaneous to major developments in post-Shafi'i usul, such as the writings of al-Juwayni, with whom he apparently differed on a number of points.
- Al-Ishara ila Madhhab Ahl al-Haqq (Arabic: الإشارة إلى مذهب أهل الحق, lit. 'The Allusion to the School of the People of Truth'), a summary of Ash'ari creed with a combination of textual and kalami proofs.
- Tabaqat al-Fuqaha' (Arabic: طبقات الفقهاء, lit. 'The Classes of Jurists'), gives the lives of the jurists among the Sahaba (companions of the Prophet), and the Tabi'in (followers of the companions of the Prophet) and those of the founders of schools and their disciples.
- Al-Nukat fi al-Masa'il al-Mukhtalaf fiha bayna al-Shafi'i wa Abi Hanifa (Arabic: النكت في المسائل المختلف فيها بين الشافعي وأبي حنيفة), a book in 'ilm al-khilāf (the science of juridical disagreement).
- Al-Ma'una fi al-Jadal (Arabic: المعونة في الجدل, lit. 'The Assistance in Debate'). (Note: According to Miller, the early period of jadal (debate, argumentation or disputation) theory in legal tradition started when Abū Ishāq al-Shirāzi (d. 476/1083) wrote a book entitled al-Ma'unah fi al-Jadal. His student, Ibn 'Aqil (d. 513/1119) also followed in his footsteps by writing a jadal book entitled Kitab al-Jadal 'ala Tariqat al-Fuqah'.)

== See also ==
- Al-Juwayni
- Al-Ghazali
- List of Ash'aris
- List of Muslim theologians
