= Tabaqat =

Genre of islamic biographical literature

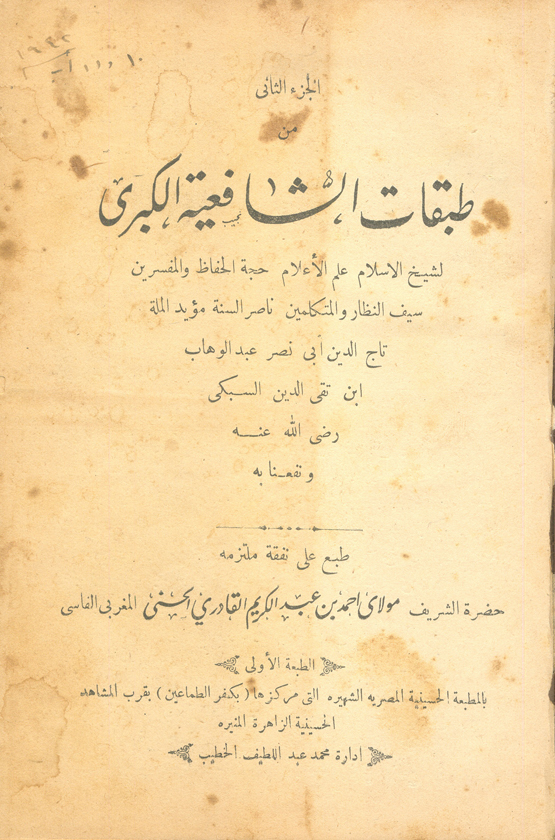
Book cover of Tabaqat al-Shafi'iyya al-Kubra by Shaykh al-Islam Taj al-Din al-Subki (d. 771/1370)

Tabaqat (Arabic: طبقات ṭabaqāt) is a genre of Islamic biographical literature that is organized according to the century in which the notable individuals (such as scholars, poets, etc.) lived. Each century or generation is known as a ṭabaqah, the plural of which is ṭabaqāt. The ṭabaqāt writings depict the past of a particular tradition of religious affiliation or scholarship and follows a chronological parameter that stretch from an authoritative starting-point to the generation (ṭabaqah) immediately preceding the assumed author.

== Development ==
Tabaqat literature originated sometime within the late eighth and ninth centuries. Another account also cited that the Tabaqat format became popular during the period of early hadith transmitter critics, emerging amid the effort to identify, classify, and evaluate transmitters in the discipline known as ilm al-rijāl. The Tabaqat literature were written as tools to assist the muhaddiths in their efforts to classify hadith transmitters and to determine the quality of particular isnads. The isnad as a system for authenticating the memory of prophetic period required righteous, honest, and competent transmitters in every generation. Biographical entries in the Tabaqat literature typically offer evaluations of the personal, religious and intellectual quality of their subjects.

== Examples ==
Famous examples of Tabaqat literature include Ṭabaqāt al-Ḥanābilah originally by Ibn Abi Ya'la and then by Ibn Rajab. Kitab Tabaqat al-Mutazilah (concerned with theologians of the Mutazilite school) by Ahmad bin Yahya al-Murtada, Kitāb al-Ṭabaqāt al-Kabīr (about the companions of the Prophet and their successors) by Ibn Sa'd and - more recently - Tabaghat Aa'lam Al-Shia (about famous Shia scholars] by Agha Bozorg Tehrani. The case of Ibrahim Hafsi's compendium of works, which are based on the ṭabaqāt historiographical framework, also demonstrate how the genre is applied in various fields in the Arabo-Islamic civilization and religious disciplines.

== See also ==
- Tabaqat-i Nasiri
