= Al-Khatib al-Baghdadi =

Muslim scholar and historian (1002–1071)

- الخطيب البغدادي

Personal life
- Born: 24 Jumadi' al-Thani, 392 A.H/May 10, 1002 C.E Hanikiya, Abbasid Caliphate
- Died: 7 Zulhijja, 463 A.H/ September 5, 1071 C.E Baghdad, Abbasid Caliphate
- Era: Islamic golden age
- Region: Iraq
- Main interest(s): Hadith, Fiqh, History
- Notable work: History of Baghdad
- Occupation: Islamic scholar, Muhaddith, Muslim Jurist, Historian

Religious life
- Religion: Islam
- Denomination: Sunni
- Jurisprudence: Shafi'i
- Creed: Ash'ari

Muslim leader
- Influenced by: Al-Shafi'i Abu Nu'aym al-Isfahani Abu Ishaq al-Isfarayini Abu al-Tayyib al-Tabari Al-Mawardi Al-Quduri
- Influenced: Abu al-Walid al-Baji Ibn Makula Ibn Aqil Abu Ya'la ibn al-Farra' Ibn Asakir Ibn al-Sam'ani Ibn al-Dubaythi Ibn al-Najjar Al-Dhahabi Al-Lalaka'i

Abū Bakr Aḥmad ibn ʿAlī ibn Thābit ibn Aḥmad ibn Māhdī al-Shāfiʿī, commonly known as al-Khaṭīb al-Baghdādī (Arabic: الخطيب البغدادي) or "the lecturer from Baghdad" (10 May 1002 – 5 September 1071; 392 AH-463 AH), was an Iraqi Sunni Muslim scholar known for being one of the foremost hadith scholars and historians of his time. He is widely considered an important authority in hadith, fiqh and history.

== Early life ==
=== Birth ===
Al-Khatib al-Baghdadi was born on 24 Jumadi' al-Thani, 392 A.H/May 10, 1002, in Hanikiya, a village south of Baghdad.

=== Education ===
He was the son of a preacher and he began studying at an early age with his father and other shaykhs. Over time he studied other sciences but his primary interest was hadith. At the age of 20 his father died and he went to Basra to search for hadith. In 1024 he set out on a second journey to Nishapur and he collected more hadith in Rey, Amol and Isfahan. It is unclear how long he travelled but his own accounts have him back in Baghdad by 1028. He later travelled to Levant and performed his pilgrimage in Hejaz.

=== Teachers ===
Al-Khatib studied under the most prominent scholars of his time. He took hadith from Abu Nu'aym al-Isfahani (main teacher), Abu Bakr al-Barqani, Al-Lalaka'i, Al-Abdawi and Karima Bint Ahmad Bin Muhammad al-Marzawiyya. He took his fiqh from Abu Ishaq al-Isfarayini, Abu al-Tayyib al-Tabari, Al-Mawardi, and Shaykh Abu al-Hassan bin al-Mahamili.

== Scholarly life ==
=== Career ===
Al-Dhahabi said that contemporary teachers and preachers of tradition would usually submit what they had collected to Al-Baghdadi before they used them in their lectures or sermons. Al-Khatib was known for his brilliant preaching skills for which he was nicknamed the Preacher of Baghdad.

He taught hadith in the most prestigious places such as the Great Mosque of al-Mansur in Baghdad and Umayyad Mosque in Damascus, indicating his high status and scholarship. Ibn Nasir narrated: "When al-Khatib read hadith in the mosque of Damascus, his voice could be heard from one end of the mosque to the other and he spoke in pure Arabic."

=== Students ===
Al-Khatib had many students with some becoming renowned scholars:

- Abu al-Walid al-Baji
- Ibn Makula
- Al-Nasr al-Maqdisi
- Ibn Aqil
- Al-Humaydi
- Abu Mansur al-Shaybani
- Abu Ya'la ibn al-Farra'

== Migration to Damascus ==
When a rebellion in 1059 led by the Turkish general Basasiri deposed Caliph Al-Qa'im (Abbasid caliph at Baghdad), and deprived Al-Baghdadi of his protection in Baghdad, he left for Damascus and there spent eight years as a lecturer at the Umayyad Mosque until a major controversy erupted. Damascus was under the Fatimid rule and Al-Khatib criticized the Shia version of call to prayer by calling it an "innovation" which offended the Shi'i population. Yaqut relates that when news of the controversy reached the ruler of Damascus, he was furious and ordered that al-Khatib be killed. However the police chief, a Sunni, realizing that to follow the order would lead to a backlash against the Shi'i, warned al-Khatib to flee to the protection of Shari ibn Abi al-Hasan al-'Alawi.

== Death ==
Al-Khatib spent about a year exiled in Sur, Lebanon before he returned to Baghdad, where he died in September 1071. He was buried next to Bishr al-Hafi.

== Creed ==
‘Abd al-‘Aziz ibn Ahmad al-Kattani claimed Al-Khatib belonged to the school of Abu al-Hasan al-Ash'ari. The historian Al-Dhahabi agreed and stated the position of Al-Khatib regarding the Divine Attributes, that "they are to be passed on exactly as they came, without interpretation." Al-Dhahabi goes on to narrate Al-Khatib’s methodology of rejecting nullification (ta'til) and anthropomorphism (tashbih) of the Divine Attributes:

Abu Bakr al-Khatib said: "As for what pertains to the divine Attributes, whatever is narrated in the books of sound reports (Sahih Hadiths) concerning them, the position (belief) of the Salaf consists in their affirmation and letting them pass according to their external wordings while negating from them modality (kayfiyya) and likeness to things created (tashbîh). A certain people have contradicted the Attributes and nullified what Allah (God) had affirmed (Himself); while another people have declared them real (literal) then went beyond this to some kind of likening to creation and ascription of modality. The true objective is none other than to tread a middle path between the two matters. The Religion of Allah (Islam) lies between the extremist and the laxist. The principle to be followed in this matter is that the discourse on the Attributes is a branch of the discourse on the Essence. The path to follow in the former is the same extreme caution as in the latter. When it is understood that the affirmation of the Lord of the Worlds [in His Essence] is only an affirmation of existence and not of modality, it will be similarly understood that the affirmation of His Attributes is only an affirmation of their existence, not an affirmation of definition (tahdîd) nor an ascription of modality. So when we say: Allah has a Hand, hearing, and sight, they are none other than Attributes Allah has affirmed for Himself. We should not say that the meaning of ‘hand’ is power (al-qudra) nor that the meaning of ‘hearing’ and ‘sight’ is knowledge (‘ilm), nor should we say that they are organs (lâ naqûlu innahâ jawârih)! Nor should we liken them to hands, hearings, and sights that are organs and implements of acts. We should say: All that is obligatory is [1] to affirm them because they are stated according to divine prescription (tawqîf), and [2] to negate from them any likeness to created things according to His saying (There is nothing whatsoever like unto Him) (42:11) (and there is none like Him) (112:4)."

=== Dispute ===
As a result of Al-Khatib's unwavering adherence to Ash'arism, his defence of Kalam, and his outspoken, harsh criticism of the Hanbalis, tensions between them escalated in Baghdad. As a result of his persecution, he was compelled to relocate to Damascus from his hometown. Ibn al-Jawzi charged him for bigotry and fanaticism due to his severe criticism of the Hanbalis.

== Controversy over al-Baghdadi ==
Biographers Sibt ibn al-Jawzi, Ibn Kathīr, and Ibn Taghribirdi wrote that the original was a work by as-Suri which al-Baghdādī had extended. Yāqūt al-Ḥamawī attributed the authorship to as-Surī's sister and accused al-Baghdādī of plagiarism, whereas Ibn Kathīr made no accusation of plagiarism, but attributed the original to as-Suri's wife.

He was accused of being Hanbali then switched to becoming Shafi'i according to Ibn Al-Jawzi, however, early and contemporary historians unanimously agreed that he began his career as a Shafi‘i and was never a Hanbali in his life.

== Reception ==
The Hanbali hadith master, Ibn Aqil said: "Al-Khatib wrote abundantly on the science of hadith and became the undisputed hadith authority in his time." Al-Mu’taman al-Saji said "that the people of Baghdad never saw anyone such as al-Khatib after Al-Daraqutni." Abu ‘Ali al-Baradani said: "It is probable al-Khatib never met his equal." Abu Ishaq al-Isfarayini said: "Al-Khatib is the Daraqutni of our time."

Ibn Makula said:

"He was one of the foremost scholars whom we witnessed in his science, precision, memorization, and accuracy in the hadith of the Messenger of Allah. He was an expert in its minute defects, its chains of transmission, its narrators and transmitters, the sound and the rare, the unique and the denounced, the defective and the discarded. The people of Baghdad never had someone comparable to Abu al-Hasan ‘Ali ibn ‘Umar al-Daraqutni after the latter, except al-Khatib."

Al-Dhahabi said:

"The most peerless imam, erudite scholar and mufti, meticulous hadith master, scholar of his time in hadith, prolific author, and seal of the hadith masters."

== Works ==
Ibn Hajar declared his works influential in the field of the Science of hadith and Hadith terminology saying, "Scarce is the discipline from the disciplines of the science of ḥadīth on which he has not written a book." He then quoted Abu Bakr ibn Nuqtah, a Hanbali scholar, as saying, “Every objective person knows that the scholars of ḥadīths coming after al-Khaṭīb are indebted to his works.” Over 80 titles have been attributed to al-Baghdādī.

Selected list of works.

- History of Baghdad or Madīnat as-Salām ('City of Peace') and Appendix of Scholars - 23 volumes. Considered his magnum opus and a major work in Islamic history.
- Al-Amali ("The Dictations") of which three volumes exist in the Zahiriyya collection.
- Al-Asma’ al-Mubhama ("Anonymous Mentions"), identifying those mentioned anonymously in hadiths or hadith chains.
- Al-Bukhala ("The Misers") in three volumes.
- Al-Faqih wa al-Mutafaqqih ("The Jurist and the Student of the Law").
- Al-Fasl li al-Wasl al-Mudraj fi al-Naql ("The Decisive Statement On Attributions Inserted Into Transmission").
- Al-Fawa’id al-Muntakhaba ("The Select Benefits").
- Iqtida’ al-‘Ilm al-‘Amal ("Knowledge Necessitates Deeds").
- Al-Jahr bi Bismillah al-Rahman al-Rahim ("Pronouncing the basmala Outloud"), listing – as al-Daraqutni did in his Sunan – the proof-texts of the Shafi‘i school on this practice. Ibn al-Jawzi in al-Sahm al-Musib stated that all of the hadiths adduced by al-Khatib in al-Jahr – as is the case with al-Daraqutni’s proofs for the basmala in his Sunan – are either weak or very weak. Al-Dhahabi also wrote a critique of al-Khatib’s book, as did the Hanbali Muhammad ibn Ahmad ibn ‘Abd al-Hadi.
- Al-Jami‘ li Akhlaq al-Rawi wa Adab al-Sami ("The Compendium on the Ethics of the Hadith Narrator and the Manners of the Auditor") in two volumes, the continuation of Sharaf Ashab al-Hadith.
- Al-Khayl ("Equestrianism"). Al-Khatib relates from his father that their origin was of a Beduin Arab tribe specializing in raising horses in al-Jasasa, bordering the Euphrates.
- Al-Kifaya fi ‘Ilm al-Riwaya ("The Sufficiency in the Science of Hadith Narration"), it is still considered to be the best work on the subject in our day and age. Al-Khatib comprehensively enumerated the norms of hadith narration in about 170 chapters, explaining its principles and general rules as well as the schools of the scholars when their opinions differed.
- Manaqib Ahmad ibn Hanbal ("The Immense Merits of Imam Ahmad").
- Manaqib al-Shafi‘i ("The Immense Merits of Imam al-Shafi‘i").
- Al-Mudih li al-Jam‘ wa al-Tafriq ("The Clarifier of Collation and Dispersion"), listing the different names under which the same person may be identified in transmission chains.
- Musnad Abi Bakr al-Siddiq ‘ala Shart al-Sahihayn ("Narrations Related by Abu Bakr According to the Criterion of al-Bukhari and Muslim").
- Al-Muttafaq wa al-Muftaraq ("Similar-Looking Narrators’ Names").
- Nasiha Ahl al-Hadith ("The Faithful Counsel of the Masters of Hadith").
- Al-Qunut wa al-Athar al-Marwiyya Fih ("The qunût and Its Proof-Texts") according to the Shafi‘i school.
- Al-Rihla fi Talab al-Hadith ("Travel in Pursuit of A Hadith")
- Riwaya al-Sahaba ‘an al-Tabi‘i ("Narration of the Companions From a Tabi‘i"), listing examples of this occasional case.
- Al-Sabiq wa al-Lahiq ("The Precursor and the Subsequent in Chronology") in ten volumes.
- Salat al-Tasbih wa al-Ikhtilaf Fiha ("The Prayer of Glorification and the Difference of Opinion Concerning Its Status"), an authoritative presentation of its proof-texts that goes together with Ibn Nasir al-Din al-Dimashqi’s al-Tarjih li Hadith Salat al-Tasbih, al-Mundhiri’s documentation in the first volume of At-Targhib wat-Tarhib, and Ibn al-Salah’s discussion in his Fatawa. Sharaf Ashab al-Hadith ("The Eminence of the Masters of Hadith") in which he narrated Abu Dawud’s saying: "Were it not for this band of people we would not be studying Islam."
- Al-Tabyin li Asma’ al-Mudallisin ("The Exposition of the Names of Those Who Concealed Their Sources").
- Taqyid al-‘Ilm ("The Fettering of Knowledge"), an important book gathering all the proofs that large-scale writing of hadith began in the time of the Prophet, together with particular caveats against it.
- Al-Tatfil wa Hikayat al-Tufayliyyin ("Sponging and Spongers").
- Tali Talkhis al-Mutashabih, an addendum to Talkhis al-Mutashabih.
- Talkhis al-Mutashabih fi al-Rasm ("Summary of the Similarities in Spelling"), on hadith narrators commonly confused with one another due to the similar spelling of their names.

== See also ==
- List of Ash'aris

== Sources ==
- Gibril Fouad Haddad (2 May 2015). "Imam Khatib al-Baghdadi (392 AH – 463 AH, 71 Years Old)". The Biographies of the Elite Lives of the Scholars, Imams & Hadith Masters. Zulfiqar Ayub. pp. 163–175.
