= Jam' al-Jawami' =

Book by Taj al-Din al-Subki

- Editor: 'Aqila Husayn
- Author: Taj al-Din al-Subki
- Original title: جمع الجوامع في أصول الفقه
- Language: Arabic
- Subject: Usul al-Fiqh
- Publisher: Dar Ibn Hazm, Beirut
- Publication date: 2011
- Publication place: Egypt during the Mamluk rule
- Pages: 573
- ISBN: 9782745132239
- Preceded by: Tabaqat al-Shafi'iyya al-Kubra
- Followed by: Mu'id al-Ni'am wa Mubid al-Niqam (The Restorer of Favours and the Restrainer of Chastisements)

Jam' al-Jawami' fi Usul al-Fiqh (Arabic: جمع الجوامع في أصول الفقه, lit. 'Collection of Collections in the Principles of Jurisprudence') is a major classical 14th-century treatise and compendium written by Taj al-Din al-Subki, the leading legal theoretician of his time. It is a highly revered work on the subject of principles of Islamic jurisprudence and it continues to be the primary text on Shafi'i principal to this day, and many schools and madrassas (Islamic centres) around the world utilise it as a study book, including the esteemed Islamic university of al-Azhar.

== Background ==
Ibn al-Subkī, under the influence of the scholarly tradition of his era in the field of legal theory (uṣūl al-fiqh), first completed al-Ibhāj, a commentary that his father Taqī al-Dīn al-Subkī had begun on al-Bayḍāwī's (d. 685/1286) Minhāj al-Wuṣūl. He then wrote a commentary on Ibn al-Ḥājib's (d. 646/1249) Mukhtaṣar al-Muntahā, entitled Rafʿ al-Ḥājib. Afterwards, he composed this work, whose full title is Jamʿ al-Jawāmiʿ fī Uṣūl al-Fiqh, which functions as a summary of those two commentaries. However, in terms of structure and content, the work is closer to al-Bayḍāwī's Minhāj al-Wuṣūl.

== Methodology ==
Jam 'al-Jawami' does not only stop at usul al-fiqh but also combines usul al-din (principles of religion) and Adab. It is said that he congregated the methodology of the juristconsults and theologians from both the schools of Shafi'i and Hanafi, respectively.

Jamʿ al-Jawāmiʿ, like Minhāj al-Wuṣūl, consists of an introduction and seven main sections (books). The introduction defines some foundational concepts and discusses matters related to legal rulings, such as prescriptive (al-Aḥkām al-Taklīfiyya) and declaratory (waḍʿī) rulings, the source of rulings, their subject matter, and those addressed by them. The seven sections are devoted respectively to: the Quran, the Sunnah, consensus (ijmāʿ), analogy (qiyās), legal inference (istidlāl), equivalence and preponderance (taʿādul wa-l-tarjīḥ), and ijtihād. The author sometimes addresses subsidiary issues directly, and at other times under the heading “mas'ala” (issue). He often presents existing opinions without delving into detailed proofs, frequently naming the scholars who held those views.

The frequent mention of opinion holders can be explained both by his effort to gather together the uṣūl scholars who held those views, and by his attempt to correct mistaken attributions found in other works or to add names not included in Minhāj al-Wuṣūl. In many places, he summarizes earlier uṣūl discussions even if only by brief references, sometimes a single word. In Jamʿ al-Jawāmiʿ, Tāj al-Dīn al-Subkī includes views of the Ḥanafī school alongside those of other traditions, but he remains primarily within the Shāfiʿī (theologian) methodological framework. Nevertheless, since the book synthesizes earlier opinions and uṣūl literature, it is considered among works that combine different methodological approaches.

In Jamʿ al-Jawāmiʿ, the preferred opinion is usually presented first, followed by other views; sometimes all opinions are presented first and the preference is stated afterward. However, the author's preferred positions generally do not differ from those commonly accepted in the Shāfiʿī school, especially those preferred by Ibn al-Ḥājib and al-Bayḍāwī. The work does not usually provide detailed reasoning for opinions or responses to objections. The author states that he omitted the proofs found in Minhāj al-Wuṣūl for the sake of brevity, including only those evidences not explicitly mentioned in well-known works. However, in a few instances, al-Subkī does express views contrary to Ibn al-Ḥājib and al-Bayḍāwī and highlights the significance of his disagreement.

In the work, major uṣūl scholars are often referred to not by their names but by honorific titles, as was common in contemporary works. For example: “the judge (qāḍī)” refers to Abū Bakr al-Bāqillānī; “the two judges (qāḍiyān)” refers to al-Bāqillānī and Qāḍī ʿAbd al-Jabbār; “the master (ustādh)” refers to Abū Isḥāq al-Isfarāyinī; “the imām” refers to Fakhr al-Dīn al-Rāzī; “the two imāms” refers to Imām al-Ḥaramayn al-Juwaynī and Fakhr al-Dīn al-Rāzī; “the shaykh” refers to Abū al-Ḥasan al-Ashʿarī; and “the shaykh al-imām” refers to his father Taqī al-Dīn al-Subkī.

Ibn al-Subki in his Jam' al-Jawami, collects material from approximately a hundred sources and analyses all significant usuli themes in a rhetorically terse manner. It often adheres to the then-dominant structure while including problems of pure theology and morality, giving it a distinct character. Besides the sources of law and its applications, it also covers Usul al-Din related problems from kalam and fiqh. Through historical lessons, the author employs a unique methodology throughout the work. The current study lists seven such approaches and provides textual samples to support each one. In addition, it categorises and defines the terms the writer uses. The study notes that the greater number of works on the text which mention over a hundred such works categorized under various headings was probably caused by the book's broader reception among academics.

== Author's unique approach to Hadith ==
Ibn al-Subki was more than just a legal theorist. He was highly proficient in many Islamic fields, including Hadith science. In addition to being a legal thinker, he also served as a narrator, spokesperson, and critic. His interpretation of the hadiths and the methods by which he verified hadiths supporting or refuting the narrators in the line of transmission demonstrate this. Ibn al-Subki adhered to this methodology in all of his publications, even those on jurisprudential principles. Ibn al-Subki was a more eminent commentator than others who disregarded the authenticity and extraction of Hadith in their main writings. In contrast to the typical approach of legal theorists, Ibn al-Subki did not transcribe any Hadith without first verifying and offering commentary. As an accomplished jurist and linguist, he would extract the jurisprudential and linguistic benefits from the Hadiths.

== Legacy ==
It is considered as one of the most greatest and comprehensive books in the principles of law among the Sunnis. It covers every single issue in details leaving no room without an explanation that are not properly covered by other legal theorists in their works. Because Jamʿ al-Jawāmiʿ compiles earlier classical works of legal theory in a concise form, it was highly regarded by both contemporaries and later scholars. It was taught in madrasas for centuries and eventually became one of the classical foundational texts of uṣūl al-fiqh.

== Commentaries ==
An edition published by Dar al-Kutub al-'Ilmiyya, edited by Abdul-Mun'im Khalil Ibrahim

Scholars have received an unprecedented interest in the book of Jam' al-Jawami'. They have studied it, taught it, and given it various explanations. Some of them explained it in a long way, some of them explained it briefly, some of them put footnotes and comments on it, and some of them summarized it in verse or prose, and provided explanations for that summary.

The following commentaries have been written on the Jam` al-Jawami`:

- Tashnif al-Musami` bi?Jam` al-Jawami, by Badr al-Din al-Zarkashi (d. 794).
- Al-Hadaf min al-Wusul 'Iilaa Sharh lil 'Usul al-'Asasia, by Zakariyya al-Ansari (d. 823).

Abridgment of this: al-Ghaith al-Hani, by Wali al-Din al-'Iraqi (d. 826).

- Sharh Jam` al-Jawami, by Jalal al-Din al-Mahhalli (d. 864), written 827, one of the most famous commentaries on the author's work, printed in Cairo 1308 A.H., and used with the Jam` al-Jawami` itself as a textbook at the University of Cairo.
- al-Buruq al-Lawami` fi ma Urida `Ala Jam` al-Jawami, by Shams al-Din Muhammad al-Ghazzi (d. 808), a severe criticism of the Jam` al-Jawami`, put together into 32 questions. Taj al-Din wrote a new book in his own defence – Man` al-Mawani` – against this commentary.
- `Izz al-Din Abu Bakr al-Kanani (d. 819).
- Shihab al-Din al-Raula al-Muqaddasi (d. 844).
- Burhan al-Din al-Kabakibi al-Kudsi (d. 850).
- Ibn al-`Abbas al-`Adawi.
- Shihab al-Din al-Ghazzi (d. 822).
- Shihab al-Din al-Kurani (d. 893).
- `Abd al-Barri al-Halabi, the Hanafite, (d. 921).

Taj al-Din himself wrote two books on the Jam` al-Jawami`:

- Man` al-Mawani` `An Su’alat Jam` al-Jawami, about 400 pages, written as a reply to the criticism on the Jam` al-Jawami` by Shams al-Din Muhammad al-Ghazzi (d. 808) in a work called al-Buruq al-Lawami` fi ma Urida `Ala Jam` al-Jawami`. Taj al-Din takes up and answers 33 (Paris MS gives only 32) questions, stated at the beginning of the book.
- Sharh Jam` al-Jawami, a commentary on his own legal work, completed in 770 A.H., or the year before Taj al-Din died.

== Versifications ==
The Jam` al-Jawami` has been put into verse by following authors:

- Shihab al-Din `Abd al-Rahman al-Tukhi (d. 893).
- Rida al-Din al-Ghazzi (d. 925).

A commentary on this versification by the author’s son Badr al-Din al-Ghazzi (d. 984).

- Al-Kawkab al-Sati`, versification by Jalal al-Din al-Suyuti (d. 911).

A commentary by the author on his versification called Sharh al-Kawkab al-Sati`.
