= Pan-Islamism =

Movement advocating unity of Muslims under one state

Islam by country: Sunni Shia Ibadi

Flag of the Shahada, often associated with Pan-Islamism.

Pan-Islamism (Arabic: الوحدة الإسلامية, romanized: al-Waḥdat al-Islāmiyya) is an internationalist and anti-nationalist political movement that advocates the unity of Muslims under one Islamic state, often a caliphate or an international organization with Islamic principles. Historically, after Ottomanism, which aimed at the unity of all Ottoman citizens, pan-Islamism was promoted in the Ottoman Empire during the last quarter of the 19th century by Sultan Abdul Hamid II for the purpose of preventing secession movements of the Muslim peoples in the empire.

Pan-Islamism differentiates itself from pan-nationalistic ideologies, for example Pan-Arabism, by focusing on religion and not ethnicity or race. It sees the ummah (Muslim community) as the focus of allegiance and mobilization, including the Tawhid belief, by the guidance of the Quran and the sunnah.

The major leaders of the pan-Islamist movement were the triad of Jamal al-Din al-Afghani (1839–1897), Muhammad Abduh (1849–1905) and Rashid Rida (1865–1935), who were active in anti-colonial efforts to confront European penetration of Muslim lands. They also sought to strengthen Islamic unity, which they believed to be the strongest force to mobilize Muslims against imperial domination. Following Ibn Saud's conquest of the Arabian Peninsula, pan-Islamism would be bolstered across the Islamic world. During the second half of the 20th century, pan-Islamists competed against left-wing nationalist ideologies in the Arab world, such as Nasserism and Ba'athism. At the height of the Cold War in the 1960s and 1970s, Saudi Arabia and allied countries in the Muslim world led the pan-Islamist struggle to fight the spread of communist ideology and curtail the rising Soviet influence in the world.

== Classical doctrines ==
The Arabic term ummah, which is found in the Quran and Islamic tradition, has historically been used to denote the Muslims as a whole, regardless of race, ethnicity, etc. This term has been used in a political sense by classical Islamic scholars (e.g., al-Mawardi in Al-Ahkam al-Sultaniyyah, in which he discusses the contract of the imamate of the ummah, "prescribed to succeed Prophethood" in protection of the religion and of managing the affairs of the world). Al-Ghazali also discussed the ummah in a political sense in his work Fadiah al-Batinyah wa Fadail al-Mustazhariyah.

Fakhr al-Din al-Razi, who also talks about the ummah in a political sense, is quoted as saying the following:

The world is a garden, whose waterer is the dynasty, which is the authority. The guardian of this authority is the Shari'ah and Shari'ah is also the policy which preserves the kingdom; the kingdom is the city which the army brings into existence; the army is guaranteed by wealth; wealth is acquired by the subjects (Ummah) who are made servants via justice; justice is the axis of well being of the world.

— al-Razi in his Jami al-'Ulum

The ideology draws inspiration from early Islam—the era of Muhammad and the Rashidun Caliphate—particularly during the Islamic Golden Age, a period often associated with a strong, unified, and flourishing Muslim world.

== History ==
=== Origins ===
Many scholars assert that the doctrines of pan-Islamism could be observed as early as during the era of Islamic Iberia, Emirate of Sicily, the Gunpowder Empires (Ottoman, Safavid and Mughal Empires) and several Muslim sultanates and kingdoms, despite the presence and employment of non-Muslim subjects by Muslim powers. During the 18th century, multiple movements for puritanical Islamic renewal would emerge. Amongst these, the revivalist movements of three leading religious reformers – Shah Wali Allah of Delhi (1702–1763), the Arabian Muhammad Ibn 'Abd al-Wahhab (1703–1792), and the Nigerian Uthman dan Fodio (1755–1816) – are widely regarded as the precursors of the modern-era Pan-Islamist thought. Despite their calls for puritanical reform, these movements were not politically concerned with the international situation of the Muslim world, and had not elaborated comprehensive pan-Islamist programmes to combat the Western threat. Since they did not call for the revival of an international Islamic entity, their ideas and impact were limited to the local regional contexts of West Africa, Arabia, and South Asia.

In spite of their diversity, these 18th century Muslim reformers were united in their condemnation of declining morality and calls for the revival of scripture-based piety. Inspired by these movements, Islamic reformers at the turn of the 19th century adopted novel strategies for overcoming the crisis faced by the Muslim world by adapting to the fast-paced transformation of its era. Their proposed approaches now oscillated between an open admiration for the technology-mediated Western ideology of societal progress and a clear rejection of it on the grounds of the axiomatic superiority of an idealized Islamic culture, rooted in Scripturalist injunctions. Two major scholars of early colonial Egypt 'Abd al-Rahman al-Jabarti (d. 1825) and Rifa'a al-Tahtawi (d. 1872) represented these intellectual trends. While Rifa'a al-Tahtawi exemplified the former, 'Abd al-Rahman al-Jabarti represented the latter, Scriptural-oriented approach.

=== Modern era ===
==== Late 19th century ====
In the modern era, Pan-Islamism was championed by Jamal al-Din al-Afghani who sought unity among Muslims to resist colonial occupation of Muslim lands. Afghani feared that nationalism would divide the Muslim world and believed that Muslim unity was more important than ethnic identity. Although sometimes described as "liberal", al-Afghani did not advocate constitutional government but simply envisioned "the overthrow of individual rulers who were lax or subservient to foreigners, and their replacement by strong and patriotic men." In a review of the theoretical articles of his Paris-based newspaper there was nothing "favoring political democracy or parliamentarianism," according to his biographer.

While Afghani was an advocate of revolution from above, his student 'Abduh believed in revolution from below, through religious and educational reforms. Despite al-Afghani's tremendous influence on 'Abduh, the latter eventually would distance himself from Afghani's political path. He instead focused on gradual efforts in the field of education, which he viewed as more effective instruments for reform. He criticised Afghani and pan-Islamist intellectuals for their political activities. Afghani had bitter arguments with Abduh and regularly accused him of timidity and dispiritedness.

==== Early 20th century ====
Islamic jurist Muhammad Rashid Rida – a student of Abduh and Afghani – on the other hand, was an avowed anti-imperialist and an exponent of a puritanical revolution, inspired by his nostalgia for the early eras of Islam. According to Rida, the state-sponsored scholars neglected the revival of early Islamic traditions in the Muslim Ummah. He believed that the unification of the Islamic community would only be possible through the restoration of an Islamic caliphate which implements the Sharia (Islamic law). His influential Islamic journal Al-Manar promoted anti-British revolt, as well as Islamic revivalism based on the tenets of Salafiyya. Positioning himself as the successor to the pan-Islamist activism of Afghani and 'Abduh; Rida called for a pan-Islamic project based on revival of the Islamic caliphate led by Arabs and the reformation of Muslims. During the 1920s, Rida formulated the comprehensive Islamic state doctrine in his famous treatise al-Khilafa aw al-Imama al-'Uzma ("The Caliphate or the Exalted Imamate") in which he called upon Muslims to strive to build a political system based on faith; rather than nationalism. He opposed the rising embrace of Western ideas amongst Muslims, arguing that only a return to Islam would restore the rightful position of Muslims in the modern age. Pan-Islamic networks, led by Rashid Rida and his associates, played a central role in later development of Islamist movements.

Rida's Salafiyya movement advocated for pan-Islamist solidarity which involved socio-political campaigning to establish Sharia (Islamic laws). Following World War I, Rida and his disciples became the biggest adversaries of secularists and nationalists; and vehemently attacked all forms of democratic ideas. Articulating his Pan-Islamist vision, Rashid Rida wrote in Al-Manar in 1902:

"In sum, what I mean by Islamic unity is that the leaders (ahl al-Hal wal-'aqd) among the scholars and notables should meet and compile a book of ordinances which is based on the deeply-rooted fundamentals of the Divine Law, agrees with the needs of the time, is easy to use, and is free of disagreement (khilaf). The Supreme Imam then orders the rulers of Muslims to apply it (al-'amal bihi)"

In order to judge the rising importance of the Pan-Islamist movement during these years, Lothrop Stoddard in his 1921 book The New World of Islam looked at the growth in the Pan-Islamic press, writing that "in 1900 there were in the whole Islamic world not more than 200 propagandist journals", as he puts it, but "by 1906 there were 500, while in 1914 there were well over 1000."

==== Post-Ottoman era ====
After the Abolition of Caliphate in 1924, Pan-Islamism mobilized Muslim masses of both traditionalist and reform movements in Islam, inspired by the ideas of Rashid Rida. The Reformist movements led by Rida, would become more fundamentalist and literalist; emphasizing adherence to the idealised era of the Salaf and attempt to revive lost traditions. Rashid Rida's socio-political views symbolised the convergence of the doctrines of the reformist, Salafist and pan-Islamist movements. During the 1920s, Rida and his Salafi disciples established the Young Men's Muslim Association (YMMA); an influential Islamist youth organisation that spearheaded attacks against liberal trends and Western culture. This provided favourable conditions for the growth of various Islamist revolutionary movements.

The evolution of the early Pan-Islamist movement in the post-colonial world was strongly associated with Islamism. Leading Islamists such as Sayyid Qutb, Abul Ala Maududi, and Ayatollah Khomeini all stressed their belief that a return to traditional Sharia law would make Islam united and strong again. Extremism within Islam goes back to the 7th century to the Kharijites. From their essentially political position, they developed extreme doctrines that set them apart from both mainstream Sunni and Shiʿa Muslims. The Kharijites were particularly noted for adopting a radical approach to Takfir, whereby they declared other Muslims to be unbelievers and therefore deemed them worthy of death.

In the period of de-colonialism following World War II, Arab nationalism overshadowed Islamism which denounced nationalism as un-Islamic. In the Arab world secular pan-Arab parties – Baath and Nasserist parties – had offshoots in almost every Arab country, and took power in Egypt, Libya, Iraq and Syria. Islamists suffered severe repression; its major thinker Sayyid Qutb, was imprisoned, underwent torture and was later executed. Egyptian president Nasser considered the idea of Muslim unity as a threat to Arab nationalism. During his regime, Nasser took control of the mosques and appointed his own religious officials, creating a national religious establishment under government control. The religious establishment denounced the Muslim Brotherhood, a Pan-Islamist group, and labeled them as inauthentic representatives of Islam.

In the 1950s, Pakistan's government championed Muslim cooperation like many other Muslim countries, however Pakistan's efforts were complicated with its involvement in Baghdad pact and pro-western foreign diplomacy in light of the Palestine-Israel conflict, however later relations would be much better. Many Muslim countries suspected that Pakistan was aspiring to leadership of the Muslim world to in foreword help western powers in relations with other Muslim states.

==== Six-Day War ====
Following the defeat of Arab armies in the Six-Day War, Islamism and Pan-Islam began to reverse their relative position of popularity with nationalism and pan-Arabism. Political events in the Muslim world in the late 1960s convinced many Muslim states to shift their earlier ideas and respond favourably to Pakistan's goal of Muslim unity. Nasser abandoned his opposition to a pan-Islamic platform and such developments facilitated the first summit conference of Muslim heads of state in Rabat in 1969. This conference was eventually transformed into a permanent body called Organisation of Islamic Conference.

==== Post 1979: Iranian Revolution and Afghan jihad ====
In 1979 the Iranian Revolution ousted Shah Mohammad Reza Pahlavi from power. Ten years later in 1989; the Afghan mujahideen, with major support from the United States, would successfully force the Soviet Union from Afghanistan. Pan-Islamic Sunni Muslims such as Maududi and the Muslim Brotherhood, embraced the creation of a new caliphate, at least as a long-term project. Shia leader Ruhollah Khomeini (Note: Khomeini stated that Muslims should be "united and stand firmly against Western and arrogant powers." "Establishing the Islamic state world-wide belong to the great goals of the revolution." He embraced Sayyid Qutb in the past. He declared the birth week of Muhammad (the week between 12th to 17th of Rabi' al-awwal) as the Unity week. Then he declared the last Friday of Ramadan as International Day of Quds in 1981.) also embraced a united Islamic supra-state (Note: " ... the imperialist at the end of World War I divided the Ottoman State, creating in its territories about ten or fifteen petty states. Then each of these was entrusted to one of their servants or a group .... In order to assure the unity of the Islamic ummah, ... it is imperative that we establish a government ... The formation of such a government will serve to preserve the disciplined unity of the Muslims .... ") but saw it led by a (Shia) religious scholar of fiqh (a faqih).

These events galvanised Islamists the world over and heightened their popularity with the Muslim public. Throughout the Middle-East, and in particular Egypt, the various branches of the Muslim Brotherhood have significantly challenged the secular nationalist or monarchical Muslim governments. In Pakistan the Jamaat-e-Islami enjoyed popular support especially since the formation of the MMA, and in Algeria the FIS was expected to win the cancelled elections in 1992. Since the collapse of the Soviet Union, Hizb-ut-Tahrir has emerged as a Pan-Islamist force in Central Asia and in the last five years has developed some support from the Arab world.

A recent advocate for Pan-Islamism was late Turkish prime minister and founder of Millî Görüş movement Necmettin Erbakan, who championed the Pan-Islamic Union (İslam Birliği) idea and took steps in his government toward that goal by establishing the Developing 8 Countries (or D8, as opposed to G8) in 1996 with Turkey, Egypt, Iran, Pakistan, Indonesia, Malaysia, Nigeria and Bangladesh. His vision was gradual unity of Muslim nations through economic and technologic collaboration similar to the EU with a single monetary unit (İslam Dinarı), joint aerospace and defense projects, petrochemical technology development, regional civil aviation network and a gradual agreement to democratic values. Although the organization met at presidential and cabinet levels and moderate collaboration projects continue to date, the momentum was instantly lost when the so-called Post-Modern Coup of February 28, 1997, eventually took down Erbakan's government.

== See also ==
- Worldwide caliphate
- Caliphate
- Internationalism (politics)
- Islam and nationalism
- Ummah
- Muslim world
- Mujahideen
- Shia–Sunni relations
- Diaspora
- Islamism
- Muslim Brotherhood
- Hassan al-Banna
- Sayyid Qutb
- Taqi al-Din al-Nabhani
- Islamic Military Alliance

International organisations:

- Murabitun World Movement
- Muslim Brotherhood
- Jamaat-e-Islami
- Hizb ut-Tahrir

History:

- Khilafat Movement
- Silk Letter Conspiracy
