= Al-Lalaka'i =

Islamic scholar

al-Lālakāʾī

Personal life
- Born: Amol
- Died: 1027 Dinavar
- Era: Abbasid Caliphate
- Main interest(s): Theology (Kalam), Hadith, Islamic Jurisprudence
- Notable work: Extraordinary Occurrences From The Allies Of Allah

Religious life
- Religion: Islam
- Denomination: Sunni
- Jurisprudence: Shafi'i
- Creed: Ash'ari

Muslim leader
- Influenced by: Abu Ishaq al-Isfarayini
- Influenced: Al-Khatib al-Baghdadi

Hibatullah ibn al-Hasan ibn Mansour al-Tabari, Abu al-Qasim al-Razi, al-Shafi’i, al-Lalaka'i al-Amoli or Hibatullah Lalika'i (Arabic: هبة الله بن الحسن بن منصور الطبري، أبو القاسم الرازي، الشافعي اللالكائي الآملی, romanized: al-Lālakāʾī) was an Iranian hadith scholar, theologian, hafiz and Shafi'i jurist. His most famous teacher was Abu Ishaq al-Isfarayini and his most famous disciple was Al-Khatib al-Baghdadi.
