= Jawab al-qadi Abu l-Walid al-Baji ila risalat rahib Faransa ila al-Muslimin =

The Jawāb al-qāḍī Abū l-Walīd al-Bājī ilā risālat rāhib Faransā ilā al-Muslimīn ('Reply of the Qāḍī Abū l-Walīd al-Bājī to the Letter of the Monk of France to the Muslims') is a correspondence in Arabic between an anonymous Christian monk from France and the Muslim scholar Abū l-Walīd al-Bājī of Spain. The monk's letter is addressed to al-Muqtadir, the king of Zaragoza (r. 1049–1081), inviting him to convert to Christianity. The king commissioned al-Bājī to write a response rejecting the overture. One letter from each correspondent survives in a single 14th-century manuscript, although there was apparently also an earlier exchange of letters.

== Bibliography ==
- Cutler, Allan (1963). "Who Was the 'Monk of France' and When Did He Write? A Note on D. M. Dunlop's 'A Christian Mission to Muslim Spain in the 11th Century'". Al-Andalus. 28: 249–270.
- Dunlop, Douglas M. (1952). "A Christian Mission to Muslim Spain in the 11th Century". Al-Andalus. 17: 259–310.
- Epalza, Mikel de (1971). "Notes pour une histoire des polémiques anti-chrétiennes dans l'Occident musulman". Arabica. 18 (1): 99–106. JSTOR 4055947.
- Sarrió Cucarella, Diego (2012). "Corresponding Across Religious Borders: Al-Bājī's Response to a Missionary Letter from France". Medieval Encounters. 18: 1–35. doi:10.1163/157006712X63454.
- Turki, Abdelmagid (1966). "Lettre du 'Moine de France' à al-Muqtadir billāh, roi de Saragosse, et la réponse d'al-Bāy̑ī, le faqīh andalou". Al-Andalus. 31: 73–153.
- Turki, Abdelmagid (2000). "Lettre du 'Moine de France' à al-Muqtadir de Saragosse et réponse d'al-Bâdjî (entre 1049 et 1079)". In Pierre Guichard; Denis Menjot (eds.). Pays d'Islam et monde latin: x^{e}–xiii^{e} siècle. Textes et documents. Presses universitaires de Lyon. pp. 33–38.
- Zomeño, Amalia (2011). "Al-Bājī". In David Thomas; Alex Mallett; Juan Pedro Monferrer Sala; Johannes Pahlitzsch; Mark Swanson; Herman Teule; John Tolan (eds.). Christian–Muslim Relations: A Bibliographical History. Vol. 3 (1050–1200). Leiden: Brill. pp. 172–175. doi:10.1163/ej.9789004195158.i-804.85.
