= Abu Bakr al-Turtushi =

11th and 12th-century Andalusian Muslim jurist and political theorist

Abu Bakr Muhammad ibn al-Walid al-Turtushi ابو بكر محمد بن الوليد الطرطوشي

Personal life
- Born: 1059 CE (451 AH); Tortosa, Taifa of Tortosa
- Died: 1126 CE (520 AH); Alexandria, Fatimid Egypt
- Era: The 5th and early 6th Islamic century
- Region: Al-Andalus and Middle East
- Main interest: Fiqh Political Theory
- Notable work: Siraj al-Muluk fi Suluk al-Muluk (The Lamp of Kings for the Qualities of Kingmanship)
- Other name: al-Turtushi

Religious life
- Religion: Islam
- Jurisprudence: Maliki
- Creed: Ash'ari

Muslim leader
- Influenced: Ibn Tumart

'Abu Bakr Muḥammad ibn al-Walīd al-Ṭurṭūshi (Arabic: ابو بكر محمد بن الوليد الطرطوشي) (1059 – 1126 CE; 451 AH – 520 AH ), better known as Abu Bakr al-Turtushi or simply as al-Turtushi was one of the most prominent Andalusian political philosophers of the twelfth century. His book Kitāb Sirāj al-Mulūk (The Lamp of Kings) was one of the most important works of political theory to be produced in the medieval Islamic world. Al-Turtushi was also an accomplished jurist in the Maliki school.

== Biography ==
ِAbu Bakr was born in Tortosa in 1059 in the northern region of Al-Andalus at the Ebro Delta, at a time when the region had become increasingly fragmented and was divided into various taifa kingdoms. He first traveled to Zaragoza, where he became a student under Abu al-Walid al-Baji, a famous scholar and poet. While in Spain, he also familiarised himself with the philosophical and political treatises of the Andalusian polymath Ibn Hazm.

He travelled for knowledge, seeking to educate himself from various scholars in different part of the Muslim world and went as far east as Baghdad. On his way he also stopped at Damascus, Aleppo, Cairo, and Alexandria. He eventually settled in Fatimid Alexandria, where he taught at a madrassa. Al-Turtushi strongly opposed the Ismaili ideology of the Fatimid dynasty in Egypt. He also issued a fatwa for Yusuf Ibn Tashfin, the Almoravid ruler of al-Andulus (Muslim Spain) that allowed him to invade Spain and depose of the divided Taifa kingdoms. His most famous work was Siraj al-Muluk (سراج الملوك) (The Lamp of Kings) an important treatise on political theory.

== See also ==
- List of Ash'aris and Maturidis
