= Tabaqat al-Hanabila =

Ṭabaqāt al-Ḥanābilah
- Author: Ibn Abi Ya'la
- Original title: طبقات الحنابلة
- Language: Arabic
- Genre: Biography
- Publisher: al-Maʻhad al-Faransī lil-Dirāsāt al-ʻArabīyah, Dimashq
- Publication date: 1370 AD
- Publication place: Damascus, Al-Sham
- OCLC: 19759213

Ṭabaqāt al-Ḥanābilah (English: History of the Hanbalites) (Arabic: طبقات الحنابلة, lit. 'Generations of Hanbalis') is a biographical dictionary covering Hanbali scholars, written by Ibn Abi Ya'la (d. 1131 AD). The book starts from the life of the founder Ahmad ibn Hanbal himself. Later Al-Hafiz Ibn Rajab (d. 1393 AD) wrote a sequel to this book under the name Continuation of the history of the Hanbalites (Dhayl ‘alá Ṭabaqāt al-Ḥanābilah). The Continuation covers those who died after 460 AH. Modern publishing may available in 4 volumes where two volumes is original book by Ibn Abi Ya'la and following two volumes from Ibn Rajab addition.

== See also ==
- Tabaqat
