= Al-Mawardi =

Muslim scholar (974–1058)

- الماوردي

Abbasid Chief Judge
- In office 1000s–1058

Abbasid official and Diplomat
- In office 1031, 1037, 1042, 1043

Personal life
- Born: Ali c. 972 Basra, Iraq
- Died: 27 May 1058 (30 Rabi'a 450 AH) Baghdad, Abbasid Caliphate (now Iraq)
- Children: Hasan
- Parent: Muhammad ibn Habib
- Era: Islamic Golden Age (Later Abbasid era)
- Region: Iraq
- Main interest(s): Aqidah (Islamic theology), Tawhid, Islamic Jurisprudence, Principles of Islamic jurisprudence, Sharia, Hadith, Tafsir, Sociology, Political Science
- Notable works: For his treatise on Ordinances of the Government.; Qanun al-Wazarah (Laws regarding the Ministers); Kitab Nasihat al-Mulk (The Book of Sincere Advice to Rulers); Kitab Aadab al-Dunya w'al-Din (The Ethics of Religion and of this World); Personas of the Prophethood
- Known for: Works on Religion, Government, the Caliphate, and Public and constitutional law during a time of political turmoil.

Religious life
- Religion: Islam
- Denomination: Sunni
- Jurisprudence: Shafi'i
- Creed: Ash'ari

Muslim leader
- Influenced by: Al-Shafi'i Abu Hasan al-Ash'ari Abu Ishaq al-Isfarayini
- Influenced: Ibn Khaldun

Ali ibn Muhammad ibn Habib (Arabic: علي إبن محمد إبن حبيب, romanized: ʻAlī ibn Muḥammad ibn Ḥabīb; c. 974–1058), commonly known by the nisba al-Mawardi (Arabic: الماوردي, romanized: al-Māwardī), was a Sunni polymath and a Shafi'i jurist, legal theoretician, muhaddith, theologian, sociologist and an expert in political science. He is considered to be an eminent scholar of his time who wrote on numerous subjects, including Qur'anic interpretations, religion, government, public and constitutional law, language, ethics and belles-lettres.

== Name ==
As the son of a person who sold rose water, the terms "maa" (water) and "Wardah" (rose) are combined to form the name "Al-Mawardi." The title "Al-Mawardi" was given to him because of his brilliance, eloquence, and great analytical abilities in debate, discussions, and oratory. He was also eager in evaluating a variety of situations that he came across.

== Socio-political climate ==
Al-Mawardi lived during the Islamic Golden Age, a period of intellectual and cultural flourishing, but also within the decline of the Abbasid caliphate. He lived in a time signalled by a period of progressive deterioration of social and political disintegration that finally led to the fall of the Abbasid dynasty in 1258. The rise of several dynasties that broke away from Abbasid power and founded their own mini-kingdoms outside of its purview was a glaring example of this. However, even as the Abbasid dynasty's political influence declined, political, philosophical, and scientific advancements persisted throughout the Islamic world. A number of well-known individuals appeared, such as al-Mawardi, al-Farabi, al-Ghazali and others. It resulted from political leaders' intense interest in information acquisition.

Baghdad functioned as the centre of Islamic civilization and the fulcrum of the Islamic state in its formative years. The progress of Islamic civilization was fueled by the leaders of Baghdad. They also functioned as a state with power and sway over a large swath of Islamic territory.

Moreover, at that time, the idea that a nation's strength and grandeur originated from its knowledge base gained widespread acceptance. Therefore, political leaders and tyrants made great attempts to value and advance intellectual endeavours. Additionally, their way of thinking was influenced by the Mu'tazilah, a rationalistic religious movement, and the rising Shi'ism ideology that the Abbasid dynasty's rulers from the Buwayhid group accepted.

== Early life ==
=== Birth ===
He was born in the year 364 AH/974 CE in Basra, Iraq. Some authors make the claim that his family was Kurdish, a claim which is unsubstantiated.

=== Education ===
When Baghdad was a centre and hub of civilization, learning, and knowledge, that is when al-Mawardi pursued his education there. Along with his companions, he started his studies at a very young age, concentrating on religious sciences and specifically the study of Hadith. Based on chronicles of his early schooling, al-Mawardi pursued his study in his native Basra region. He received instruction in the field of Hadith from a number of well-known hadith scholars. It is confirmed by his pupil Al-Khatib al-Baghdadi that al-Mawardi was regarded in Hadith as having a solid memory, being reliable and being trustworthy. Al-Mawardi left his village to complete his education before moving to Baghdad and settling in Darb az-Za'farani. There, he pursued his education in Hadith and Fiqh and joined the renowned Abu Hamid al-Isfarayini's halaqah (study circle). Al-Mawardi set out on a journey to various regions to disseminate and put his knowledge to use after completing his education in Baghdad. He travelled for a while before coming back to Baghdad to share the immense knowledge he had gained.

=== Teachers ===
Al-Mawardi studied under prominent and leading figures of his time. He studied Kalam under Abu Ishaq al-Isfarayini. He studied Fiqh under Abu Hamid al-Isfarayini. He studied Hadith under Abubakr al-Barqani. He studied Arabic language under Muhammad Bin al-Mu'ally al-Azdy. His other notables who were renowned in Baghdad include al-Manqiri, al-Shumayri, al-Jabali, Ja'far bin Muhammad al-Fadal bin Abdullah Abu Qasim al-Dara and Ali Abu Isfarayini.

== Scholarly life ==
After gaining knowledge from his mentors, al-Mawardi started teaching in Baghdad, where many eminent scholars were his students. In addition, al-Mawardi is known for having outstanding character, patience, humility, and charm. Even though they had never met him in person, his classmates and coworkers who had the chance to get to know him attested to his qualities. These attributes also add to his great reputation and the respect he was regarded in.

Between the late tenth and mid-eleventh centuries, when al-Mawardi lived, the Muslim political landscape was marked by instability and collapse. Compared to earlier times, the circumstances were far more worrisome. The monarch al-Qadir assembled four legal scholars from the four schools of jurisprudence in 429 Hijriyah to create summaries in order to address the troubling and chaotic periods. Al-Mawardi was one of them; he was assigned to represent the Shafi'i school and authored the book al-Iqna, while al-Quduri wrote the famous al-Mukhtasar on behalf of the Hanafites. The other two works, however, were not as important. The ruler gave Imam al-Mawardi praise for his exceptional writing and declared that al-Mawardi's effort was the best and, in recognition of his excellence, named him the Aqda al-Quḍāt (supreme judge) of the Abbasid Caliphate in recognition of his accomplishments. This appointment was sparked criticism and objections from some leading jurists, including Qāḍi al-Quḍāt Abu al-Tayyib al-Tabari, and Qāḍi al-Sinsari, who disagreed with this appellation, arguing that no one should hold such position except Allah. The title of Malik al-Muluk al-A'zam was earlier granted to Jalal al-Dawla, the Buwaihid ruler, by the same jurists, thus al-Mawardi ignored these objections and kept the position until his death in 450/1058.

The leaders of the Sunni Abbasid and Shia Buwayhid dynasties nonetheless favoured al-Mawardi even though he was Sunni and followed the Shafi'i school. The Abbasid caliph appointed Al-Mawardi as his representative and sent him to a number of nations as the ambassador. He played a vital role in restoring Muslim unity by negotiating with the Buyid emirs and Seljuk sultans. He was rewarded with many grand gifts and tributes by majority of the Sultans and rulers of the time.

== Death ==
Al-Mawardi died on the 30th of Rabi'ul Awwal in 450 Hijri which is equivalent to May 27, 1058 CE at the age of 86. Al-Khatib al-Baghdadi attended and led the funeral prayer for him. Numerous rulers and scholars attended the funeral of al-Mawardi. His body was buried in Mansur, Baghdad's Bab Harb Cemetery. His death came just 11 days after the passing of Qadi Abu al-Tayyib.

== Legacy and contribution to political science and sociology ==
Al-Mawardi was the founder of the political science in the Islamic World and first writer on political theory in the history of Islam. He is therefore considered one of the most renowned pioneers and thinkers of the political science in Islamic history. His original work influenced the development of this subject, together with the science of sociology, which was further developed and expanded later on by Ibn Khaldun.

Al Mawardi's contribution impacted heavily to the two fields through a number of monumental of great books authored by him, his most famous were Kitab al-Ahkam al-Sultania, Qanun al Wazarah, and Kitab Nasihat al-Mulk. These books discuss the principles of political science with special reference and ministers, relationships between the populace and the administration, as well as calculations to strengthen the government and secure a victory in conflict.

The first Islamic jurisprudence work devoted solely to political application and governance was his book Al-Ahkām As-Ṣulṭāniyyah. Al-Mawardi was "the first Muslim scholar to bother to collect all the ordinances relating to public law and arrange them in one volume." Al-Ahkām, since then has been the primary standard source in both contemporary studies of Islamic mediaeval political theory and conventional Sunni political thinking.

Al Mawardi was an author and advocator of the doctrine necessity in political science. He was in favour of a strong government and spoke out against unlimited powers given to the governors which he postulated would create disorder and chaos on the other hand, he has brought forth clear principles for elections of the Caliph rulers and standards of the voters among which the most important achievement of a degree of intellectual capacity and also morality of the character. On the subject of "Ethics", he wrote his book Kitaab adaab al-dunya wa al-din, which became widely a famous book on this topic and is still read in many Islamic countries of today.

== Works ==
Al-Mawardi was a prolific writer who created a large body of written material. His judicial actions did not lessen his love of writing. Despite having to relocate frequently due to his judicial duties, al-Mawardi persisted in teaching and mentoring his pupils while writing a book. Since much of his writings were hidden in books that have never been found, they have not been well known throughout history. Based on the papers he described, only a small percentage of his works have been located and shared among his students. Al-Mawardi is remembered as a meticulous and sincere scholar in which he manifests it into his works.

=== Fiqh ===
- Al-Hawi al-Kabir fi Fiqh al-Shafi'i, a comprehensive encyclopedia of Shafi'i jurisprudential doctrine (22 volumes).
- Al-Iqna
- Adab al-Qadhi
- Alam an-Nubuwwah

=== Political science ===
- Al-Ahkam al-Sultaniyyah [ar] (The Ordinances of Government)
- Qanun al-Wazarah (Laws regarding the Ministers)
- Kitab Nasihat al-Muluk (The Book of Sincere Advice to Rulers)

=== Qur'an ===
- Al-Nukat wa'l-ʿuyūn fī tafsīr al-Qurʾān popularly Tafsir al-Mawardi (6 volumes)
- Tafsiru al-Qur'an al-Karim
- Al Amtsaku wa Ak-Hikamu

=== Other ===
- Kitab Aadab al-Dunya w'al-Din (The Ethics of Religion and of this World)
- Personas of the Prophethood

== See also ==
- List of Ash'aris
- List of Kurdish philosophers
- Islamic scholars
- Nasîhatnâme

== Bibliography ==
- Firman Dwi Alamsya; Muh. Nurrochim Maksum; Mohammad Zakki Azaki (2023). Triono Ali Mustofa; Syamsul Hidayat; Mohammad Zakki Azani; Muhammad Wildan Shohib (eds.). Implementation of Leadership According to Al-Marwadi's Perspective (Biography of Al-Marwadi). Proceedings of the International Conference on Islamic and Muhammadiyah Studies (ICIMS 2023). Atlantis Press SARL. pp. 300–302. ISBN 978-2-38476-102-9.
- Mujahidin, Mujahidin (2017). "Konsep Iqtha' Pemberian Tanah Kepada Masyarakat Dalam Pemikiran Ekonomi Al-Mawardi (Studi Kitab Al-Ahkam Alsultaniyyah)" [Iqtha Concept of Giving Land to the Communityh in Economic Thinking of Al-Mawardi (Study of the Kitab Al-Ahkam Alsultaniyyah)]. Al Amwal Journal of Islamic Economic Law. 2 (1): 1–17. doi:10.24256/alw.v2i1.535.
- Al-Zuhayili, Wahbah (2021). Fiqih Islam wa Adilatuhu Jilid 6 Jaminan (al-Kafaalah); Pengalihan Utang (al-Hawaalah); Gadai (ar-Rahn); Paksaan (al-Ikraah); Kepemilikan (al-Milkiyah) (in Indonesian). Gema Insani. p. 527. ISBN 978-602-250-889-2.
