= Ibn Aqil =

Baghdad based Islamic theologian (1040–1119)

Personal life
- Born: 431 AH (1039/1040 CE) Baghdad
- Died: 513 AH (1119/1120 CE)
- Era: Islamic golden age
- Main interest(s): History, Tafsir, Hadith and Fiqh
- Occupation: Muslim scholar

Religious life
- Religion: Islam
- Denomination: Sunni
- School: Hanbali
- Creed: Ash'ari

Ibn Aqil (Note: Arabic: أَبُو الْوَفَاءِ عَلِيُّ بْنُ عَقِيلِ بْنِ مُحَمَّدِ بْنِ عَقِيلِ بْنِ أَحْمَدَ الظَّفَرِيُّ الْبَغْدَادِيُّ الْحَنْبَلِيُّ) (1040–1119) was an Islamic scholar and theologian from Baghdad, Iraq. He was trained in the tenets of the Hanbali school for eleven years under scholars such as the Qadi Abu Ya'la ibn al-Farra'. Despite this, Ibn Aqil was forced into hiding by the traditionalist Hanbalis for frequenting the circles of groups who were at odds with the Hanbali tradition. In one of his reminiscences, he remarks that his Hanbali companions wanted him to abandon the company of certain scholars, and complains that it hindered him from acquiring useful knowledge.

Ibn Aqil studied with Hanbalis, Hanafis, Shafi'is, Mu'tazilis, and Sufis, and was described by Ibn Taymiyya as more knowledgeable than al-Ghazali. His early teachers included three women scholars: al-Huraniyya, Bint al-Junayyid, and Bint al-Gharrad.

Ibn Aqil had completed five years of undergraduate study and seven years of graduate study in law, but at that time, for a candidate to qualify for a professorial position in law, one normally needed fifteen years of graduate level study in jurisprudence. Ibn ‘Aqil, despite being younger than all the other professorial candidates, was selected to occupy the professorial chair at the Mosque of the Caliph al-Mansur, and with this, Ibn ‘Aqil became the head of the Hanbali school in Baghdad.

== Creed ==
Ibn 'Aqil leaned strongly toward Ash'arism; he had signed, around 455, the fatwa protesting against its persecution, and it was he who, in 476, performed the ablutions on the body of his friend, Abu Ishaq al-Shirazi, the Ash'arite rector of the Nizamiyya of Baghdad. His forced retraction represents one episode in the struggle carried on by Hanbalites against Ash'arite Shafi'ites, who got back at them five years later when Abu Ishaq al-Shirazi succeeded in getting Abu Ja'far ibn Abi Musa arrested.

== Works ==
Among his works of jurisprudence that have survived are Wadih fi usul al-fiqh and (in part) Kitab al-funun, a huge collection of anecdotes about the attitudes and customs of his times, in one hundred volumes. In it he writes:

Truly, it is not lawful for me to waste a single moment of my life; so that when my tongue is not engaged in instructive conversation and disputation, or my sight in studying, I engage my mind in meditation in my moments of rest, lying down, only to rise with some thought having occurred to me which I then commit to paper. In the eighth decade of my life, I do indeed experience a zeal for learning more intense than that experienced when I was a young man of twenty.
