= Abu al-Walid al-Baji =

Maliki scholar

Imam Abu al-Walid al-Baji أبو الوليد الباجي
- Title: Al-Ḥāfiẓ

Personal life
- Born: 1013 Beja
- Died: 1081 (aged 67–68) Almería
- Era: Islamic Golden Age
- Region: Al-Andalus
- Main interest(s): Fiqh, Hadith, Islamic theology (kalam), Poetry
- Occupation: Scholar, Jurist, Muhaddith, Theologian, Poet

Religious life
- Religion: Islam
- Denomination: Sunni
- Jurisprudence: Maliki
- Creed: Ash'ari

Muslim leader
- Influenced by: Malik Ibn Anas Abu al-Hasan al-Ash'ari Abū Dharr al-Harawī Abu al-Tayyib al-Tabari Abu Ishaq al-Shirazi al-Khatib al-Baghdadi Ibn 'Abd al-Barr
- Influenced: Abu Bakr al-Turtushi

Abu al-Walid al-Baji, full name Sulayman ibn Khalaf ibn Saʿd (or Saʿdun) ibn Ayyub al-Qadi Abu al-Walid al-Tujibi al-Andalusi al-Qurtubi (28 May 1013 – 21 December 1081), was a Sunni scholar from Beja in al-Andalus. He was an eminent Mālikī jurist (faqih), hadith master (muhaddith), theologian (mutakallim), poet and a man of letters. He was an accomplished debater, prolific writer in numerous scientific works and was a meticulous scholar whose high calibre of knowledge and religious merit are widely acknowledged. He and Ibn Ḥazm were "the two most important literary figures in eleventh-century al-Andalus".

== Life ==
Al-Baji was born in Beja on 28 May 1013 to a family from Badajoz. The family later relocated to Córdoba, where he received his primary education. At the age of 23, he went east to continue his studies. He remained there for thirteen years, three in Mecca studying under Abū Dharr al-Harawī. After a period in Baghdad under Abū l-Ṭayyib al-Ṭabarī and Abū Isḥāq al-Shīrāzī, he spent a year in Mosul under Abū Jaʿfar al Simnānī, possibly studying kalām. He may also have visited Aleppo, Damascus and Egypt. He worked at various times as a watchman and a goldsmith to support himself.

During these intense travels, he took hadith from al-Khatib al-Baghdadi, Ibn 'Abd al-Barr, Abu al-Isba` ibn Shakir, Muhammad ibn Isma`il [?], Abu Muhammad Makki ibn Abi Talib, al-Qadi Yunus ibn `Abd Allah ibn Mughith, Ibn al-Mutawwa`i, Ibn Muhriz, Ibn al-Warraq, Ibn `Amrus, al-Damighani, and others. Both al-Khatib and Ibn `Abd al-Barr, although his seniors, narrated from him. Among his pupils are his son Ahmad, Abu `Abd Allah al-Humaydi, `Ali ibn `Abd Allah al-Saqali, Ahmad ibn Ghazlun, Abu Bakr al-Turtushi, the two hadith masters Abu `Ali al-Jiyani al-Sadafi and Abu al-Qasim al-Ma`afiri, Ibn Abi Ja`far, al-Qadi Abu `Abd Allah Muhammad ibn `Abd al-Rahman ibn Bashir, and many others.

After he returned to Andalusia in 1047 and assumed the role of leading scholar and teacher there, his fortune increased significantly. A-Baji was thrust into the spotlight as soon as he had returned to home. In a disputation in Mallorca in 1048, he bested Ibn Ḥazm, leading to the latter's exile from the island. Ibn Hazm reportedly said: "If the Malikis had only `Abd al-Wahhab and al-Baji, it would suffice them." He spent time in Murcia, Dénia, Orihuela, Valencia and Lleida before settling in Zaragoza after the defeat of the crusade of Barbastro in 1065. His most productive years were those in Zaragoza under the patronage of Aḥmad al-Muqtadir. He died in Almería on 21 December 1081.

== Works ==
- Al-Tasdid ila Ma`rifa al-Tawhid
- Sunan al-Minhaj
- al-Minhāj fī tartīb al-ḥijāj, the earliest work produced in the west on "the science of disputation in the field of jurisprudence"
- Iḥkām al-fuṣūl fī aḥkām al uṣūl, on the principles of usul al-fiqh
- al-Taʿdīl wa-l-tajrīḥ li-man kharraja ʿanhu al-Bukhārī fī al-Ṣaḥīḥ, the transmission of hadith
- Sharh al-Muwaṭṭaʾ, a commentary on the Muwaṭṭaʾ of Mālik ibn Anas, survives in two versions:
  - Kitāb al-istifaʾ, the fuller version
  - Kitāb al-muntaqā, an abridgement
- Sunan al-Salihin
- Tahqiq al-madhhab, edited by Abu Abd al-Rahman Ibn Aqil al-Zahiri (Riyadh: 1983)
- Risāla fī al-ḥudūd
- Jawāb al-qāḍī Abū l-Walīd al-Bājī ilā risālat rāhib Faransā ilā al-Muslimīn

== See also ==
- List of Ash'aris
- List of Muslim theologians
