= Abu Ishaq al-Isfarayini =

Islamic scholar

Personal life
- Born: 337 AH (948/949 CE) Isfahan, Iran
- Died: 418 AH (1027/1028 CE) Nishapur
- Era: Islamic golden age
- Region: Khorasan
- Main interest(s): Aqidah, Kalam, Fiqh, Usul al-Fiqh, Hadith, Tafsir, Arabic
- Occupation: Muhaddith, Scholar

Religious life
- Religion: Islam
- Denomination: Sunni
- Jurisprudence: Shafi`i
- Creed: Ash'ari

Muslim leader
- Influenced by: Al-Shafi'i Abu al-Hasan al-Ash'ari Ibn Furak Baqillani
- Influenced: Abu al-Tayyib al-Tabari Al-Mawardi Al-Lalaka'i Al-Bayhaqi Al-Qushayri Abu Mansur al-Baghdadi Abu Ishaq al-Shirazi Al-Khatib al-Baghdadi

Abu Ishaq al-Isfarayini (Arabic: أبو إسحاق الإسفراييني) was a renowned Sunni scholar, jurisconsult, legal theoretician, hadith expert, Qur'anic exegete, theologian and a specialist in the Arabic language. Al-Isfara'ini's scholarship was focused on the sciences of Aqidah, Hadith and Fiqh. He was the foremost leading authority in the Shafi'i school of his time. He was along with Ibn Furak the chief propagator of Sunni Ash'ari theology in Nishapur at the turn of the 5th Islamic century.

== Biography ==
=== Birth and Education ===
Abu Ishaq al-Isfarayini was born in Isfarayin, a town snuggled in the gateway to the northern mountains of Khorasan and divided from the main road linking from Bayhaq to Nishapur by a grass valley and a chain of hills. There is little known of his childhood except that he received a comprehensive Islamic education centered on Islamic jurisprudence, Hadith, Islamic theology, and Aqidah (creed). He studied hadith intensively with scholars such as Abu Bakr al-Ismai'li and also travelled to Baghdad to further his studies and attended the lectures of some of the most famous Sunni scholars of his time including, Abul-Hasan al-Bahili, Baqillani and Ibn Furak.

=== Career ===
Al-Isfara'ini then chose to leave Baghdad and return to his native town of Isfarayin despite the esteem and favour shown to him by the scholars of Iraq. Later he accepted an invitation to Nishapur, where a school was built for him. From 411 AH he held sessions teaching hadith in the congregational mosque of Nishapur.

=== Students ===
Abu Ishaq specialized in Shafi'i law, legal theory, hadith and theology and would pass his extensive knowledge onto many of his students. His most famous students became world renowned of their time:

- Abu al-Tayyib al-Tabari
- Al-Mawardi
- Al-Lalaka'i
- Al-Bayhaqi
- Al-Qushayri
- Abu Mansur al-Baghdadi
- Abu Ishaq al-Shirazi
- Al-Khatib al-Baghdadi

=== Death ===
Al-Isfara'ini died in the Islamic month of Muharram in 418 AH (February 1027 CE), and was buried in Isfarayin. His tomb continued to attract pious visitors in the 6th/12th century.

== Reception ==
Ibn Asakir said: "Abu Ishaq al-Isfarayini is one of the people who deserves to occupy the position of mujtahid because of the depth and breadth of his knowledge, as well as meeting the requirements as an imam: ability in Arabic, fiqh, kalam, and usul fiqh, as well as understanding the Qur'an and the Sunnah."

== Influence ==
Almost none of Abu Ishaq's books have survived and Al-Nawawi states the reason is because his books were too vast to be contained in tomes. Abu Ishaq wrote extensively on legal theory, Shafi'i substantive law, hadith and theology, but scholars believe he devoted a great deal of his attention in debating deviant sects such as attacking the Mu'tazila beliefs. He wrote down one work entitled al-mukhtasan fi al-radd ala ahl a-i'lizal wa al-qadar (Abbreviated refutation of the Mu'tazila and those Believers in Free Will) and another named al-Jami' al-haly fi usul al-din wa al-radd ala al-mulhidin (The ornamented Concordance of the Principles of Dogma and a refutation of the Nonbelievers). In addition, Abu Ishaq engaged in multiple public debates with the Mu'tazila including Al-Qadi Abd al-Jabbar. Abu Ishaq also attacked the beliefs of the Karramiyya sect who held anthropomorphic views of God.

However, despite none of Abu Ishaq's books being preserved, his scholarly opinions were extremely valued and pop up frequently in later Shafi'i works on legal theory and major scholars like Abu Ishaq al-Shirazi and Ibn al-Salah recognized the significance of Abu Ishaq's role in formulating the Shafi'i/Ash'ari position on issues like abrogation and consensus. Later Shafi'i legal theorists such as Imam al-Haramayn al-Juwayni and Al-Ghazali have preserved Abu Ishaq's position on the issue of the epistemological yield of hadiths and the effect of consensus.

== See also ==
- List of Ash'aris
