= Taj al-Din al-Subki =

Egyptian Islamic scholar (1327–1370)

Imam Tāj al-Dīn al-Subkī
- تاج الدين السبكي
- Title: Shaykh al-Islam; Qadi al-Qudat; Taj al-Din; Al-Ḥāfiẓ

Personal life
- Born: July 3, 1327 (AH 727/8) Cairo, Egypt
- Died: July 3, 1370 (aged 43) (771 AH) Damascus, Syria
- Era: Mamluk Sultanate
- Region: Egypt and Levant
- Main interest(s): Islamic theology, Hadith, Islamic jurisprudence, Principles of Islamic jurisprudence, History, Arabic grammar
- Notable work(s): Tabaqat al-Shafi'iyya al-Kubra (The Generations of the Shafi'is), Jam' al-Jawami' (The Collection of Collections), Mu'id al-Ni'am wa Mubid al-Niqam (The Restorer of Favours and the Restrainer of Chastisements), Al-Sayf al-Mashur fi Sarh 'Aqidat Abi Mansur (The Unsheathed Sword of Explanation of the Doctrine/Creed of Abu Mansur al-Maturidi)
- Occupation: Scholar, Jurist, traditionist, legal theoretician, theologian, historian, grammarian

Religious life
- Religion: Islam
- Denomination: Sunni
- School: Shafi'i
- Creed: Ash'ari

Muslim leader
- Influenced by: Al-Shafi'i, Abu Hanifa, Abu al-Hasan al-Ash'ari, Abu Mansur al-Maturidi, Al-Tahawi, Taqi al-Din al-Subki, Abu Ishaq al-Shirazi, Ibn Furak, Ibn 'Asakir, Al-Juwayni, Al-Ghazali, Fakhr al-Din al-Razi, Ibn Tumart, Ibn al-Hajib, Al-Baydawi, Al-Qushayri, Al-Junayd, Al-Dhahabi, Dhul-Nun al-Misri
- Influenced: Firuzabadi, Ahmad ibn Qasim al-Buni, Ali Gomaa, Sa'id Foudah

Abū Naṣr Tāj al-Dīn ʻAbd al-Wahhāb ibn ʿAlī ibn ʻAbd al-Kāfī al-Subkī (Arabic: تاج الدين عبد الوهاب بن علي بن عبد الكافي السبكي);, or Tāj al-Dīn al-Subkī (Arabic: تاج الدين السبكي); or simply Ibn al-Subki (1327–1370) was a preeminent Sunni Islamic scholar based in Egypt and the Levant. He was a highly regarded jurisconsult, historian, and theologian, recognized as one of the foremost legal theoreticians of the Shafi'i school.

Although he died at the age of 43, he is considered one of the best scholars of his time and held some of the highest academic positions documented in the medieval history of Syria. He became well-known and respected for his academic achievements, notably achieving the rank of mujtahid in jurisprudence and its principles. Ibn al-Subki produced many works in various fields of science.

The Subkis were an influential and prestigious dynasty, and well known for their knowledge. Members of the family were the chief judges of Cairo and Damascus, preachers at the grand mosque in Damascus, and teachers at esteemed schools in both cities, and held some of the highest civil posts in the Muslim world. Among the Subkis, Taqi al-Din and his son Taj al-Din are likely to be the most well known. In terms of scholarly effort and teaching, Taj al-Din may be surpassed by his father, but his fame as an author (notably because of his two well-known works, Jam' al-Jawami' and al-Tabakat), is considered to have surpassed his father.

== Political era ==
One of the notable features of the period in which Ibn al-Subki lived was the established scholarly and intellectual activity under the Mamluk Sultanate. During the Bahri Mamluk era, Egypt and the Levant were administered as a single political entity, and the Mamluk rulers patronized scholars and religious institutions. Numerous schools, mosques, and educational establishments were founded during this time, contributing to the growth of intellectual life and attracting scholars, jurists, and students from different parts of the Islamic world. Some historians have interpreted the extensive scholarly production of the period as a response to the challenges posed by the Mongol invasions and the Crusades, as scholars sought to preserve and transmit Islamic intellectual traditions.

According to biographical sources, Ibn al-Subki lived between 727 AH and 771 AH during the rule of the Bahri Mamluks. Scholarly activity in Egypt and Syria expanded during this period due in part to the patronage extended by several Mamluk sultans to scholars, jurists, and educational institutions. Sources also report that scholars and jurists frequently participated in religious and scholarly debates held in the courts and educational centers of the time.

== Early life ==
=== Birth ===
While most biographers, including Al-Ghazzi and Ibn Shuhba, place al-Subki's birth in Cairo, others remain unspecified on the location; notably, Ibn Hajar al-Asqalani omits the birthplace entirely. The native biographers also disagree as to when exactly Ibn al-Subki was born; Ibn Ayyub, Ibn Hajar, and al-Ghazzi give the year 727 A.H., while Ibn Shuhba gives the same year but notes that "others say 728." A few, like Mubarak and al-Suyuti, give 729 A.H. However, most authorities agree that he was 44 years old when he died, and since he died in 771, he is likely to have been born in 727.

=== Education ===
Cairo was Ibn al-Subki's initial schooling location. He was first educated by his father, celebrated scholar Taqī al-Dīn al-Subkī, an influential figure in the umma. Ibn al-Subki's Cairo studies were supervised by several distinguished professors, including Yunus al-Dabusi, Ali Yahya ibn Yusuf al-Misri, Abd al-Muhsin al-Sabuni, Abu Bakr Muhammad ibn Abd al-Aziz al-Sa`bi, Fath al-Din Ibn Sayyid al-Nas, Salih ibn Muhaqar, Abd al-Qadi ibn al-Mutuk, and the Qadi Abd al-Ghaffar al-Sa`di.

However, Ibn al-Subki's higher education came from Damascus. At age 12, he joined his father in Damascus and continued to study under him, as well as the other leading scholars of his day like Jamal al-Din al-Mizzi, the greatest traditionist of his day and a renowned jurist and philologist. Under him, Ibn al-Subki studied Hadith and Arabic grammar. He also studied under the renowned writer, theologian, and historian Shams al-Din al-Dhahabi, who was the traditions professor at the Damascus chapel Umm al-Salih.

Zaynab bint al-Kamal and Ibn al-Yarr are added by Ibn Hajar, while Taqi al-Din Ibn Rafi, al-Najm al-Qahafazi, and al-Hajjar are added by al-Ghazzi to the list of Damascus instructors. Nevertheless, Taj al-Din's most influential teacher, aside from his father, appears to have been the renowned jurist Shams al-Din ibn al-Naqib, 662–745 A.H., professor at al-Shamiyya al-Barraniyya in Damascus. Al-Naqib gave him some of his own workload as a teacher and legal advisor. Al-Naqib died when Taj al-Din was eighteen. In addition to attending lectures, he conducted independent research. As the biographers put it, "he studied by himself" and became an expert in various fields of study "until he was skilled in the knowledge of jurisprudence, traditions, grammar and poetry."

=== Teachers ===
Ibn al-Subki was taught by:

- Taqi al-Din al-Subki under him, he studied all various of Islamic sciences.
- Jamal al-Din al-Mizzi under him, he extensively studied Hadith science.
- Shams al-Din al-Dhahabi under him, he studied Hadith, history and other fields.
- Ibn al-Naqib under him, he studied Shafi'i jurisprudence.
- Abu Hayyan al-Gharnati under him, he studied Arabic grammar.
- Salah al-Din al-Safadi under him, he studied Arabic literature.

== Scholarly positions and ordeal ==
His public career as a writer, teacher, and jurisconsult then started. "He began to teach, gave decisions on legal questions, traditioned, carried on researches and occupied himself with literary compositions." Prior to assuming any governmental post, Ibn al-Subki was a teacher at Damascus' elite educational institutions, including al-Taqwiyya, al-Dimaghiyya, al-Nasiriyya, al-Qimariyya, and the traditional al-'Ashrafiyya, al-Aziziyya, al-Shamiyya al-Barraniyya, al-Adiliyya, and al-Masruriyya.

In the year 754 A.H., Ibn al-Subki held the position of Muwaqqi al-Dast, which appears to have been his first public post. In the same year, he succeeded his brother, Jamal al-Din, as Chief Qadi following the latter's death.

In the year 756, after serving in that capacity for two years, he was granted official investiture in the office at his father's request. Aged 28, he was initially named head of the Qadi (judge) of Damascus in the month of Rabi I, one of the most prestigious and significant civil offices in the nation. Due to his judgements as head qadi, he repeatedly got into trouble, as described by his biographers, and was removed, and then reinstated. He retained this position off and on until his death.

In the year 759, he was deposed from his position as chief qadi for the first time, following three years of service. Baha' al-Din, Ibn al-Subki's second cousin, succeeded him as head qadi, according to Ibn Habib. He was brought back into the office after two months. He was appointed a lecturer at al-Aminiyya in the same year.

In the year 763, for the second time, Ibn al-Subki lost his position as head judge. When his brother Baha' al-Din, who was then serving in Cairo, was summoned to Damascus, he was appointed head qadi instead of his brother, who had been banished, against his will. Ibn al-Subki himself moved to Cairo, where he became the Khatib (preacher) at the Mosque of Ibn Tulun and replaced his brother as a professor of Shafi'ite law.

Ibn al-Subki's time in Cairo was brief; the same year, he went back to Damascus and started working as a teacher at al-Shamiyya al-Barraniyya, al-Aminiyya, the traditional school al-Ashrafiyya, and al-Udrawiyya. According to his biographers, these schools "flourished under his hands."

In 764, the subsequent year, he was reinstated as chief judge, a position he now held for the third time. He was appointed as mudarris (professor) at the al-Nasiriyya al-Juwaniyya and preacher at the Umayyad Mosque at the same time. Five years later, in the year 769, he faced the greatest struggle of his life. After that, he was charged with being dishonest, expelled in shame from his positions, and held captive in the castle for nearly 80 days. The biographers consistently allude to this as the most significant challenge of his life, so significant, in fact, that no qadi prior to him had ever encountered anything comparable. They also hint that it might have something to do with his judgeship, since he consistently encountered difficulties as a result of carrying out that role.

To the best of the editor's knowledge, Ibn Hajar al-Asqalani is the only biographer who explains the circumstances surrounding this removal and the imprisonment. Ibn Hajar states:

"And was the strongest cause for his removal the last time that the sultan, when he had ordered the levying of taxes from the merchants in Jumada II, the year 69 [of course 769 is meant, ed.], found with the executors a large sum, which in the receipts was ordered to be paid out in the handwriting of the qadi, but there was no indication there, as to the name of the receiver. Then he asked from the Inspector of the orphans if he knew that it had come to the qadi. Then he denied. He said: The affair is a cause for the dismissal of the qadi."

According to Ferdinand Wüstenfeld, Ibn al-Subki's dismissal from office was due to a legal decision that he would not revoke. As the cause, the orientalist Carl Brockelmann accuses "embezzlement of public funds."

Although the text is not entirely clear, it appears that Ibn al-Subki was charged with embezzling public funds, which he controlled in his capacity as qadi. However, the biographers concur that he was innocent of the charge made against him, as became clear as the case progressed. But, at the time, he was removed from his positions as professor, speaker, and chief qadi, and imprisoned for almost eighty days.

Ibn al-Subki remained resilient throughout these legal challenges. Ibn Hajar noted that during his imprisonment and trial, he demonstrated “courage and strength” in debate, eventually overcoming his accusers. According to Ibn Hajar, after his reinstatement, he pardoned those who had opposed him. Some sources state that one of the reasons for his removal from the judiciary was his refusal to retract legal rulings that displeased the political authorities. Other accounts attribute his imprisonment to his authorship of The Restorer of Blessings, in which he presented his views on reforming the governmental system of the Mamluk state.

Following Ibn al-Subki’s dismissal, his offices were transferred to his rival, Siraj al-Din al-Bulqini. Despite the opposition he faced, Ibn al-Subki also retained the support of a number of associates and supporters, particularly in Cairo, who advocated for his exoneration and reinstatement. According to biographical accounts, these supporters persuaded the Naʾib of Egypt, ʿAli al-Masīdīnī, to summon both Ibn al-Subki and his brother, Bahāʾ al-Dīn, to Cairo, and delegates were subsequently sent to Damascus for this purpose. Ibn al-Subki initially remained in Damascus while his brother traveled first, but he later departed for Cairo after al-Bulqini assumed his former offices.

Biographical sources state that Ibn al-Subki received a favourable reception in Cairo. Ibn Shuhba wrote that “the people rejoiced over his deliverance, because he was dear to them for his modesty and graciousness of disposition.” After a short stay in Cairo, Ibn al-Subki returned to Damascus. According to the biographers, support for him also emerged among the people of Syria, who protested what they viewed as injustice against him. The accusations brought against him were eventually dismissed, and sources report that he did not seek revenge against his opponents.

He was reinstated as a preacher at the Great Mosque following his exoneration. Al-Bulqini became so displeased with Ibn al-Subki's reinstatement that he resigned as head qadi, took his family, and moved to Cairo. Ibn al-Subki was now reinstated and assumed the position of head qadi for the fourth and final time in 770 A.H., and was appointed a professor at al-Shamiyya.

== Disciples ==
Al-Subki had a following of pupils from every school:

- Imam Qadi Majd al-Din al-Firuzabadi al-Shirazi al-Lughuqi
- Abu Musa Imran ibn Idris ibn Muammar al-Jaljuli (d. 780 AH) was a Shafi'i reciter. He studied recitation with his master, Ibn al-Sabki, and worked as a jurist.
- Al-Ghazzi, Issa ibn Othman ibn Issa al-Ghazzi, Sheikh Sharaf al-Din (d. 799 AH) visited Damascus and had a close relationship with al-Sabki. He created a great deal of art and learned from Al-Subki. For example, he wrote the several volumes of Sharh al Minhaj (Kabeer, Mutawasit, and Sagheer) and Idab al Qudat. In the Umayyad Mosque, he gave religious legal opinions.
- Ibn Khatib Mansuriyah; Abu Jamal Hamwi Shafi'i; Yusuf Ibn Hassan ibn Mohammed Hassan ibn Masoud ibn Ali ibn Abdullah Al Jamal (d. 809 AH). He was born in Hama in 737 AH. He was a follower of Ibn al-Subki. He learned fundamentalism and jurisprudence from Al-Subki. Sharh Faraid Minhaj and Sharh Ahkam Hadiths were written by Ibn Khatib Mansuriyah.
- Sheikh Abu Musa Muhammad bin Mahmoud bin Ishaq bin Ahmed Al-Halabi, then Al-Maqdisi (d. 776 AH) was a Hanafi scholar, but he turned into a Shafi'i with his care.

== Death ==
Taj al-Din al-Subki died on 2 July 1370 at his residence in Nairab, near Damascus, aged 44. He was buried in his family's tomb at the foot of Mount Qasioun outside the city.

== His personality and scholastic specialization ==
Ibn al-Subki was regarded as a prominent figure of his time due to his involvement in public affairs, governmental positions, and scholarly output. Contemporary and later biographical sources describe him as intellectually gifted, highly educated, and active in both scholarly and administrative life. He was also noted for his honesty, energy, and generosity.

According to biographical accounts, Ibn al-Subki demonstrated scholarly ability from an early age. Before the age of eighteen, he had reportedly acquired sufficient expertise in Islamic law to be entrusted with legal responsibilities by Ibn al-Naqib, including the adjudication of cases and the performance of some official duties. He later succeeded his father as chief qadi at the age of twenty-five and was reappointed to the position at the age of twenty-eight.

Biographers describe Ibn al-Subki as perceptive and quick-witted, with a strong command of the Arabic language and a reputation for eloquence. He was known for his skills in public speaking, debate, and improvisation, qualities that were highly valued in the intellectual culture of the period.

Ibn al-Subki was associated with several fields of scholarship, including hadith, History, Arabic grammar, Qur'anic exegesis, customs, and Arabic literature. His principal area of specialization, however, was Islamic jurisprudence, in which he gained recognition as a legal authority and consultant. In one of his writings, he referred to himself as a mujtahid, a statement that biographical sources report was not publicly disputed.

He also acquired a reputation as a scholar of Arabic literature and bibliography. Hajji Khalifa frequently cited him in discussions concerning the authorship of various works, legal literature, and textual commentary and criticism, while also quoting from his writings.

In addition to his scholarly activities, Ibn al-Subki served as chief qadi, taught in several educational institutions, delivered sermons, and authored numerous works. Biographical accounts portray him as a diligent scholar, teacher, judge, and writer.

Sources further describe Ibn al-Subki as a man of strong moral conviction and religious devotion. He is said to have admired Umar II and to have shown an interest in religious mysticism. His writings contain favourable references to Sufis and ascetic figures.

Ibn al-Subki is portrayed in biographical literature as firmly committed to the Shafi'i school of law and opposed to theological and religious innovations that he considered heterodox. He was also known for criticizing what he viewed as negligence, misconduct, or corruption among officials, judges, and scholars, regardless of their status. Sources describe him as supportive of simplicity and critical of luxury and excess.

Despite descriptions of him as compassionate and approachable, biographers also portray him as strict, courageous, and uncompromising in defending his views. Some accounts depict him as supportive of disadvantaged and oppressed individuals.

His outspoken criticism of political and scholarly elites reportedly earned him both supporters and adversaries. Biographical sources state that he was respected by some contemporaries for his integrity and learning, while others opposed him because of his criticisms and judicial decisions.

Several biographers describe Ibn al-Subki’s career as turbulent, noting that his legal judgments and confrontational style contributed to repeated dismissals from office as well as later reinstatements and promotions. Ibn Kathir summarized his career by stating that he experienced both hardships and honours unprecedented among qadis of his time.

== Relations with the Mamluk state and his political views ==
Ibn al-Subki lived during the period of the Turkish Mamluk (Bahri) dynasty, particularly under the rule of the sons and grandsons of Al-Nasir Muhammad. Contemporary and later sources describe the period as politically unstable. During Ibn al-Subki’s lifetime, which lasted approximately forty-four years, thirteen sultans ascended to power. Several chroniclers portray the sultans of the period as heavily influenced by military emirs, who frequently removed or deposed rulers whose policies conflicted with their interests.

Through the judicial and administrative positions he held, Ibn al-Subki became closely acquainted with the political and social conditions of the Mamluk state. His writings discuss what he regarded as administrative corruption and social decline, as well as proposals for reform.

These views were expressed most notably in his work Muʿid al-Niʿam wa Mubid al-Niqam (“The Restorer of Blessings and the Exterminator of Afflictions”). The work was written in response to a question concerning whether lost religious or worldly blessings could be restored. Ibn al-Subki argued that blessings are lost through neglect of gratitude and moral obligations, and that gratitude is expressed through the heart, speech, and actions. He illustrated these ideas through discussions of various professions and state offices, beginning with the office of the sultan and ending with beggars, while outlining the ethical responsibilities associated with each position.

In discussing state institutions, Ibn al-Subki also referred to the concentration of major political and administrative offices in the hands of the Mamluks. Some modern writers interpret his criticism of state officials and administrative practices as reflecting dissatisfaction with aspects of Mamluk governance. According to some accounts, his criticisms contributed to his imprisonment, particularly following the circulation of Muʿid al-Niʿam wa Mubid al-Niqam.

Modern authors have described Ibn al-Subki as a reform-minded scholar because of his writings on governance and public administration. The Egyptian writer al-Sadiq Husayn described him as a reformer whose outlook anticipated that of later Egyptian intellectuals such as Muhammad Abduh.

== Legacy and scientific contribution ==
Taj al-Din al-Subki was noted for the large number of works he produced despite his relatively short life. He died during the plague at the age of forty-four, yet authored numerous works while also serving in several public offices and travelling between Syria and Egypt. According to biographical sources, it was considered a rare feat and his writings were studied both during his lifetime and after his death. Several of his works also contributed to his lasting reputation as a scholar and author.

=== Principles of Jurisprudence ===
Ibn al-Subki is considered one of the most prominent legal theoreticians in history and acquired the status of ijtihad in the field. His work on the principles of law - Jam' al-Jawami' - is considered to be a highly notable and well written work on the subject, and is the standard text book for the study of Shafi`ite law at the Al-Azhar University, the largest Islamic university in the world.

Taj al-Din al-Subki was regarded by later biographers as one of the leading scholars of his generation. He devoted considerable attention to the study of legal theory, both through teaching and writing. His works in the field included commentary, criticism, and engagement with the opinions of earlier and contemporary scholars. Biographical sources describe him as clarifying complex issues, addressing ambiguities in earlier works, and contributing to the development and organization of the discipline. He authored eight works on uṣūl al-fiqh, a number noted by later writers as unusually large for a single scholar in the field.

=== Jurisprudence ===
Ibn al-Subki was regarded by biographical sources as one of the leading Shafiʿi jurists of his time. Some later scholars described him as having attained the rank of ijtihad, a status considered rare among jurists. He served as chief judge in Damascus, and his fatawa were widely consulted by scholars. He also authored several important works on Islamic jurisprudence. Ibn al-Subki received much of his early training from his father, Taqi al-Din al-Subki, who was among the prominent jurists of the period. His writings contain numerous legal discussions and fatwas, and he also compiled collections of his father’s juridical opinions and legal rulings.

=== Hadith science ===
Although Ibn al-Subki was primarily known as a jurist, he also devoted significant attention to Hadith science. He lived during the Mamluk period, an era noted for its extensive scholarly and cultural activity in the Islamic world. Modern studies describe the period as one in which numerous scholars contributed to the preservation and development of Islamic sciences, including hadith. Ibn al-Subki showed particular interest in the authentication and study of hadith, and later scholars of hadith literature commented positively on his methodology in the field.

Biographical sources state that Ibn al-Subki studied both the transmission (riwāyah) and interpretation (dirāyah) of hadith. He transmitted hadith through established isnāds, examined narrators through the science of jarḥ wa-taʿdīl, and discussed the wording and interpretation of hadith reports in his writings. He also addressed methodological questions related to narrator criticism and evaluation. Later scholars, including Ibn Hajar al-ʿAsqalānī, referred to his expertise in hadith, particularly in relation to his work Ṭabaqāt al-Shāfiʿiyyah. Ibn al-Subki authored several works on hadith and related sciences, reflecting his broader scholarly engagement beyond jurisprudence.

=== History & biography ===
In addition to his work in jurisprudence and hadith, Ibn al-Subki was also known for his contributions to history and biographical literature. Biographical sources describe him as possessing extensive knowledge of earlier scholars and historical reports. His best-known contribution in this field was Ṭabaqāt al-Shāfiʿiyyah, a biographical dictionary of prominent Shafiʿi scholars from the time of Imam al-Shafi'i to Ibn al-Subki’s own era. Ibn al-Subki produced three versions of the work: al-Ṭabaqāt al-Kubrā, the most extensive version; al-Ṭabaqāt al-Wusṭā, an abridged version; and al-Ṭabaqāt al-Ṣughrā, a shorter summary. It remains as the most authoritative source when it comes to studying the biographies of the Shafi'i school, and some writers have described it as among the best written work on the subject.

=== Islamic theology ===
In his other well-known work on theology, "Al-Sayf al-Mashur fi Sarh 'Aqidat Abi Mansur," he demonstrated his mastery of theology by providing an in-depth explanation of Abu Mansur al-Maturidi's doctrine. From an Ash'arite perspective, it is regarded as one of the major published theological analyses of the Maturidi school. The author discusses in detail the differences between Ash'aris and Maturidis, emphasising that they are mostly semantic in nature and that the two schools are one.

=== Literature ===
In the field of literature, biographical sources describe Ibn al-Subki as possessing a refined literary style characterized by precision in language and careful word choice. His literary interests were influenced in part by his association with Salah al-Din al-Safadi, with whom he maintained a close relationship from an early age. Ibn al-Subki reportedly stated: “I was with him since I was in puberty, and we used to write to each other, and through him I became interested in literature.” In addition to his scholarly works, Ibn al-Subki was also known for his contributions to both prose and poetry.

=== Grammar studies ===
Ibn al-Subki also studied Arabic grammar (naḥw), which was traditionally regarded as an essential discipline for the study of jurisprudence and legal theory. He studied grammar under Abū Ḥayyān al-Andalusī, one of the leading grammarians of the period. Biographical sources cite his association with Abū Ḥayyān as evidence of his scholarly training in the field. His knowledge of grammar is reflected in several of his writings, including passages in his Ṭabaqāt in which he discussed his teacher Abū Ḥayyān and various grammatical issues. He also devoted a chapter in his work Al-Ashbāh wa al-Naẓāʾir to grammatical expressions connected to jurisprudential questions, under the title Grammatical Terms upon which Jurisprudential Issues Depend.

== Reception ==
Taj al-Din was praised by numerous renowned scholars and his eminence is unanimously agreed upon. Here are a few examples:

- Shihāb Aḥmad ibn Qāsim al-Būnī al-Jazā'irī al-Mālikī (d. 1139 AH) regarded him as being on the same level as the four Imams, founders of the followed schools of thought, and said about him: "The imam whose greatness is unanimously agreed upon, whose excellence is complete. Indeed, it has been said that if a fifth imam were to be considered alongside the four Imams (Abu Hanifa, Malik, Al-Shafi'i, and Ahmad), it would be Ibn al-Subkī."
- Ṣalāḥ al-Dīn al-Ṣafadī said about him in his famous book al-Wafi bi al-Wafiyat: "The imam, the learned scholar, the jurist, the hadith expert, the grammarian, the poet... He issued fatwas, taught, composed poetry, corresponded with me and I with him. In short, his knowledge was vast despite his young age."
- al-Ṣafadī also said: "With this noble son, hope in [finding someone like] Qāḍī Iyās has ended, as he surpassed the elders among his peers while still in his youth. He is younger in age but greater than us. Reason and transmission alike testify that though young in years, he is mature in knowledge, forbearance, and intellect. May God cause time to benefit from his contributions, and elevate him in religion and in worldly affairs to the ranks of his father, by His grace and generosity."
- The master of the hadith scholars of Islam, Ibn Ḥajar al-ʿAsqalānī, said about him: "He delved deeply into the pursuit of hadith, writing individual volumes and comparative works, all while persistently studying jurisprudence, legal theory, and Arabic, until he excelled while still young. He possessed eloquence and a sweet tongue, was insightful in affairs, his writings spread during his lifetime, and he was granted success in them."

== Works ==
Ibn al-Subki produced a great deal of scientific richness; his contributions were unmatched. He acquired the upper hand as one of the best writers. It was clear that he left behind extensive compilations that demonstrated his vast knowledge. His list of works:

=== Books on Usul al-Fiqh ===
- Jam` al-Jawami` fi Usul al-Fiqh, in seven volumes and introductions, completed 760 A.H. at Nairab near Damascus, a compendium of the principles of law. This is perhaps the most famous of the authors many works.
- Man` al-Mawani` `An Su'alat Jam` al-Jawami, about 400 pages, written as a reply to the criticism on the Jam` al-Jawami` by Shams al-Din Muhammad al-Ghazzi (d. 808) in a work called al-Buruq al-Lawami` fi ma Urida `Ala Jam` al-Jawami`. Taj al-Din takes up and answers 33 (Paris MS gives only 32) questions, stated at the beginning of the book.
- Sharh Jam` al-Jawami, a commentary on his own legal work, completed in 770 A.H., or the year before Ibn al-Subki died.
- Tawshih al-Tashih fi Usul al-Fiq, completed in 761 A.H.
- Tarshih al-Tawshih wa Tarjih al-Tashi, an enlarged edition of the former work.
- Raf` al-Hajib `an Mukhtasar ibn al-Haji, a commentary on the work by Ibn al-Hajib, containing the principles of Malikite law, and being an abridged edition of that authors larger work al-Muntaha. Brockelmann does not mention this commentary, neither among the works of Taj al-Din, nor among the other commentaries on this work. Taj al-Din refers to this work of him in the Mu`id al-Ni`am wa Mubid al-Niqam. On this work by Ibn al-Subki notes have been written by `Izz al-Din Ibn Jama`a (d. 819) and by the brother of the author Baha' al-Din al-Subki (d. 773).
- Sharh Minhaj al-Usul Ila `Ilm al-Usu, a commentary on the work of al-Baydawi. Taj al-Din refers to this work in the Mu`id al-Ni`am as a work of his own. Brockelmann does not mention this book among, the works of Ibn al-Subki. According to Ibn Ayyub the work had been begun by the father of Ibn al-Subki and then completed by himself.

=== Books on Fiqh ===
- Tarjih Tashih al-Khilaf, 1600 verses of the measure rajaz, in which Ibn al-Subki, following the outlines made by his father and also adding a new chapter, corrects the mistakes made by al-Nawawi in his works on al-fiqh.
- Sharh Tanbih fi al-Fiqh lil-Shiraz, a commentary on al-Tanbih by Abu Ishaq al-Shirazi
- Kitab al-Fatawi, an edition of a work of his father, containing answers to questions of law.
- Kitab al-Ashbah wal-Naze'ir, a work on legal questions, according to Ibn Najim (d. 970), the best work written on the subject.
- Al-Qawa`id al-Mushtamila `Ala al-Ashbah Wal-Naza'i, a work by Ibn al-Subki, mentioned by Ibn Shuhba and Ibn Ayyub, but whether this is a different work from al-Ashbah itself the editor has not been able to determine.
- Jalab Halab (?) – written J-l-b H-l-b, also given by Ibn Shuhba and Ibn Ayyub, consists of answers to questions on law, raised by Shihab al-Din al-Adra`i from Halab (d. 783).

=== Books on Biography ===
- Tabaqat al-Shafi'iyya al-Kubra ("The Major Classes/Generations of the Shafi'is")
- Tabaqat al-Shafi'iyya al-Wusṭā ("The Medium Classes/Generations of the Shafi'is")
- Tabaqat al-Shafi'iyya al-Ṣughrā ("The Concise Classes/Generations of the Shafi'is")

=== Books on Theology ===
- Al-Sayf al-Mashur fi Sarh 'Aqidat Abi Mansur an explanation of the doctrine of Abu Mansur al-Maturidi.
- Qasida on al-Ash`ari, 56 verses of the measure kamil, explaining the differences between the principles of Abu Hanifa and those of al-Ash`ari. [The other Qasida on al-Ash`ari comes under the heading Biography, next, ed.]
- Qawa'id al-Din Wa'undat al-Muahidina
- Shahadh al-Uqul Qadr al'Iimkan fi al-Radi Aley al-Baydawi

=== Books on Hadith ===
- Tashhidh al-Adha, a revised edition of his fathers work on traditions Qadr al-Imkan fi Hadith al-I`tikaf.
- Takhrij 'Ahadith 'Ihya' Ulum al-Din al-Ghazali ("Graduation of the Hadiths of the Revival of Religious Sciences by Al-Ghazali")
- Qa'idat fi al-Jurh Walta'dil Waqa'idat fi al-Muarikhayni ("A rule in wounding and modification and a rule in historians")
- Juz' Ala hadith {al-Mutabayian bialkhiri} ("Part on the hadith {the two parties sold each other by option}")
- Juz' fi al-Taa'una. (Part of the plague)
- Ahadith rafa' al-Yadayni ("Raising hands speeches")
- Al-arbaʿin ("Forty Hadith")

=== Books on Grammar ===
- Tarshih al-Nah, a treatise on Arabic grammar.
- Al-Alghaz, a book on the science of enigmatical language. Hajji Khalifa does not give the exact title of Ibn al-Subki's book but takes it up among works on `Ilm al-Alghaz. Ibn Shuhba names Taj al-Din's book Alghaz. It may be the Qasida of which there is a MS in Leiden, "carmen hoc aenigmata continet."
- Qasida, 37 verses of the measure wafir, on the significations of the word `ain.

== See also ==
- List of Ash'aris
- List of Muslim theologians
- List of Sufis

== Bibliography ==
- Gibril Fouad Haddad (2 May 2015). "Taj al-Din al-Subki (727 AH – 771 AH, 44 Years Old)". The Biographies of the Elite Lives of the Scholars, Imams & Hadith Masters. As-Sunnah Foundation of America. pp. 271–280.
- Thamer Abdullah Dawood Salman Al-Shuaibi (17 June 2020). "Imam Taj al-Din al - Subki and his Method of Hadiths Authentication". PalArch's Journal of Archaeology of Egypt / Egyptology. 17 (6). University of Anbar: 1–10. ISSN 1567-214X.
- Brockelmann, Carl (1902). Geschichte der arabischen Litteratur (in German). Vol. 2. Berlin: E. Felber.
- Ḥājjī Khalīfa, Muṣṭafa ibn 'Abd Allāh (1858) [1835]. Flügel, Gustav (ed.). Kashf al-ẓunūn ʿan asāmī al-kutub wa-al-funūn (Lexicon bibliographicum et encyclopaedicum…) (in Arabic and Latin). Vol. 4. London, Leipzig: The Oriental Translation Fund of Great Britain and Ireland, Richard Bentley. pp. 242, 552.
- Ibn al-ʻImād, ʻAbd al-Ḥayy ibn Aḥmad (1966). Shadharāt al-dhahab fī akhbār min dhahab (in Arabic). Vol. 8. Bayrūt: al-Maktab al-Tijārī lil-T̥ibāʻch wa-al-Nashr wa-al-Tawzīʻ. pp. 308–10.
- Schacht, Joseph; Bosworth, C.E. (1995), "Al-Subkī", Encyclopedia of Islam, vol. IX, Leiden: E. J. Brill, pp. 744–5
- Tāj-ad-Dīn, Abū Naṣr 'Abd al-Wahhāb as-Subkī (1908), Myhrman, David W. (ed.), Kitāb Mu'īd al -Ni'am wa Mubīd an-Niķām (The Restorer of Favours and the Restrainer of Chastisements), Luzac's Semitic Text and Translation Series (in Arabic), vol. XVIII, London: Luzac & Co.
