= Al-Ahkam al-Sultaniyyah =

Book authored by Al-Mawardi

Al-Ahkam al-Sultaniyya wal-Wilayat al-Diniyya
- Author: al-Mawardi
- Original title: الأحكام السلطانية والولاية الدينية
- Translator: Asadullah Yate
- Language: Arabic
- Subject: Fiqh
- Publication date: 364–450 AH
- Publication place: Baghdad, Abbasid Caliphate
- Media type: Print (Paperback)
- Pages: 376
- OCLC: 490972715

Al-Ahkam al-Sultaniyyah, also translated as Ordinances of the Government is one of the most important books written on Islamic politics and Islamic jurisprudence of politics; it was written by the jurist Abu al-Hasan al-Mawardi. Edmond Fagnan translated it into French. In addition to Al-Ahkam al-Sultaniyyah, Al-Mawardi also wrote authoritative books on jurisprudence, commentary, religious ethics, and literature. Al-Ahkam al-Sultaniyyah is a comprehensive and important book on Islamic governance and politics, consisting of twenty chapters. It explains in detail all the areas of government such as the emirate, governor, state, police, army, judiciary, imamate, prayer, tahsil zakat, hajj, jizya and taxes, jagir, pastures, camps, criminal law and rules of accountability. This book was published from Egypt. It was published in Paris in 1895 with a French translation and commentary. His book was translated into Urdu by Maulvi Syed Muhammad Ibrahim and published by Nafis Academy Karachi and Law Library Lahore. In the book, Mawardi claimed that, Quraishi descent is one of the seven conditions of being a caliph.

== Chapters of the book ==
Judge Abu al-Hasan al-Mawardi says in the introduction to the book that he has divided it into the following chapters:

1. Chapter One: About the Contract of Imamate.
2. Chapter Two: About the Appointment of Ministers.
3. Chapter Three: About the Appointment of the Emir of the Country.
4. Chapter Four: About the Appointment of the Emir of Jihad.
5. Chapter Five: About the Authority of Public Interest.
6. Chapter Six: About the Authority of the Judiciary.
7. Chapter Seven: About the Authority of Complaints.
8. Chapter Eight: About the Authority of the Union over Relatives.
9. Chapter Nine: About the Authority of Leading Prayers.
10. Chapter Ten: About the Authority of Hajj.
11. Chapter Eleven: About the Authority of Charitable Institutions.
12. Chapter Twelve: About the Distribution of Loot and the Goods of Loot.
13. Chapter Thirteen: About the Imposition of Jizya and Kharaj.
14. Chapter Fourteen: About the Various Regulations of Land.
15. Chapter Fifteen: About the revival of dead land and the raising of water.
16. Chapter Sixteen: About fever and the companions.
17. Chapter Seventeen: About the rulings on property.
18. Chapter Eighteen: About the establishment of the Diwan and its rulings.
19. Chapter Nineteen: About the rulings on crimes.
20. Chapter Twenty: About the rulings on accounting.
