= Tabaqat al-Shafi'iyya al-Kubra =

Book by Taj al-Din al-Subki

Tabaqat al-Shāfi'iyya al-Kubra
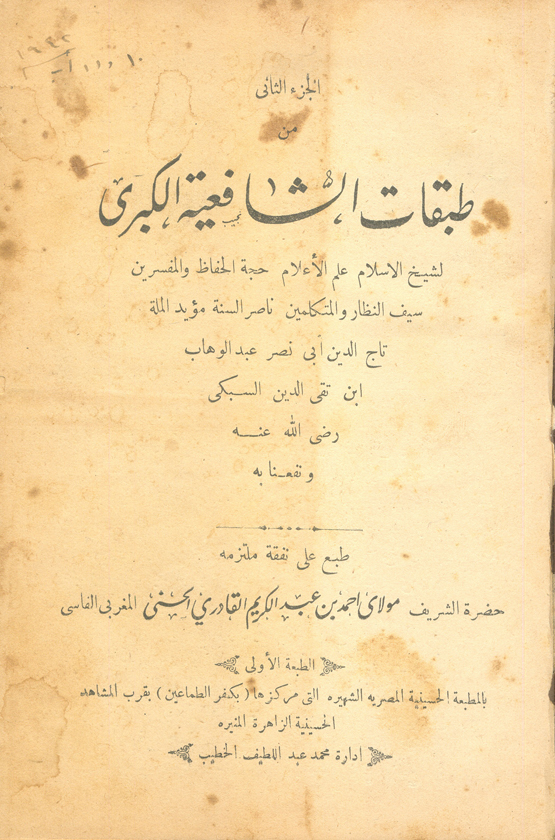
- The first edition ever published of Tabaqat al-Shāfi'iyya al-Kubra, published in 1906 in Cairo by al-Matba'a al-Husayniyya al-Misriyya. The Arabic text written on the book cover: Tabaqat al-Shāfi'iyya al-Kubra by Shaykh al-Islam, the Luminary of Luminaries, the Proof of al-Huffaz (memorizers of the Qur'an and Hadith traditions) and al-Mufassirin (the interpreters or the commentators of the Qur'an), the Sword of al-Nuzzar (the rationalists or theorists) and al-Mutakallimīn (dialecticians, theologians, or scholars of kalam), the Champion of Sunnah, the Supporter/Strengthener of Religion, Taj al-Din Abi Nasr 'Abd al-Wahhab ibn Taqi al-Din al-Subki, may God be pleased with him, and benefit us from him.
- Editors: Mahmud Muhammad al-Tanahi and 'Abd al-Fattah Muhammad al-Hilw; Mustafa 'Abd al-Qadir 'Ata
- Author: Taj al-Din al-Subki
- Original title: طبقات الشافعية الكبرى
- Language: Arabic
- Subject: Tabaqat, Biography, Islamic history, Arabic literature, Kalam, Sufism
- Publisher: Al-Matba'a al-Husayniyya al-Masriyya, 1906; Matba'at 'Isa al-Babi al-Halabi, 1964; Dar Ihya' al-Kutub al-'Arabiyya, 1976; Dar Hajar, 1992; Dar al-Kutub al-'Ilmiyya, 1999
- Publication date: 1906
- Publication place: Egypt during the Mamluk rule
- ISBN: 9782745128560
- Preceded by: Jam' al-Jawami' (The Collection of Collections)
- Followed by: Mu'id al-Ni'am wa Mubid al-Niqam (The Restorer of Favours and the Restrainer of Chastisements)
- Original text: طبقات الشافعية الكبرى at Arabic Wikisource
- Website: www.al-ilmiyah.com/details?id=978-2-7451-2856-0

Tabaqat al-Shāfi'iyya al-Kubra (Arabic: طبقات الشافعية الكبرى, lit. 'The Major Classes/Generations of the Shafi'is') is a voluminous encyclopedic biographical dictionary written by the Shafi'i-Ash'ari scholar Taj al-Din al-Subki (d. 771/1370), in which he presents biographies of scholars of the Shafi'i legal school in Sunni Islam, from the time of Muhammad ibn Idris al-Shafi'i (d. 204/820) all the way to his own contemporary time.

The work also chronicles the history of the Ash'ari school of thought, since its beginning with Abu al-Hasan al-Ash'ari (d. 324/936) all the way to Taj al-Din al-Subki's own era; because most of the Ash'ari scholars are following the Shafi'i school of Islamic jurisprudence.

== Content ==
The work is divided into seven classes (tabaqat), as follows:

1. Those who were students (disciples) of Imam al-Shafi'i (d. 204/820), the founder of the Shafi'i school.
2. Those who died between 200 AH and 300 AH.
3. Those who died between 300 AH and 400 AH.
4. Those who died between 400 AH and 500 AH.
5. Those who died between 500 AH and 600 AH.
6. Those who died between 600 AH and 700 AH.
7. Those who died after 700 AH.

In the last volume, al-Subki devotes about 150 pages to his own father, Shaykh al-Islam Taqi al-Din al-Subki (d. 756/1355).

== Notes ==
- Taj al-Din al-Subki wrote three different works on this same subject, a large work entitled, 'Tabaqat al-Shafi'iyya al-Kubra', a more summarized edition called, 'Tabaqat al-Shafi'iyya al-Wusta', and the most shortened edition called, 'Tabaqat al-Shafi'iyya al-Sughra'. These tabaqat (“classes” or “generations”) of scholars by him have the fame of being the best biographies of Shafi'i scholars ever written.

== Gallery ==
Tabaqat al-Shafi'iyya al-Kubra (Arabic: طبقات الشافعية الكبرى)

Tabaqat al-Shafi'iyya al-Wusta (Arabic: طبقات الشافعية الوسطى)

Tabaqat al-Shafi'iyya al-Sughra (Arabic: طبقات الشافعية الصغرى)

Жизнь и убеждения имама Абуль-Хасана аль-Аш'ари An abridged Russian translation of the biography of Imam al-Ash'ari from the book “Tabaqat al-Shafi'iyya al-Kubra” by Taj al-Din al-Subki.

== See also ==
- Deaths of Eminent Men and the Sons of the Epoch
- Hilyat al-Awliya'
- List of Sunni books
