= Abu al-Tayyib al-Tabari =

Islamic scholar, Chief judge and poet (960–1058)

Imam Abū al-Ṭayyib al-Ṭabarī أبو الطيب الطبري
- Title: Shaykh al-Islam; Qadi al-Qudah

Personal life
- Born: 960 Amol
- Died: 1058 Baghdad
- Era: Islamic Golden Age (Later Abbasid era)
- Region: Iran; Iraq
- Main interest(s): Fiqh, Hadith, Linguistics, Poetry
- Notable work: Sharh Mukhtasar al-Muzani
- Occupation: Jurist, Scholar, Judge, Tradionist, Linguist, Poet

Religious life
- Religion: Islam
- Denomination: Sunni
- Jurisprudence: Shafi'i
- Creed: Ash'ari

Muslim leader
- Influenced by: Al-Shafi'i Abu al-Hasan al-Ash'ari Al-Daraqutni Abu Ishaq al-Isfarayini
- Influenced: Abu Ishaq al-Shirazi Al-Khatib al-Baghdadi Abu al-Walid al-Baji

Abu’l-Ṭayyib Ṭāher Bin ʿAbdallāh Bin Ṭāher al-Ṭabarī al-Āmolī al-S̲h̲āfiʿī commonly known as Abū al-Ṭayyib al-Ṭabarī (Arabic: أبو الطيب الطبري) was an Iranian jurisconsult, professor of legal sciences and was the chief judge in Baghdad. He is regarded by his peers as one of the greatest Shafi'i jurist in the 5th/11th century. In addition, he was a traditionist, linguist and poet.

== Life ==
He was born in Amol in the region of Tabaristan during the year of 348 AH/959-60 AD. Abu al-Tayyib started his education at the age of fourteen, which was a bit late for that era. He studied at Gorgan in 371/981, then in Nishapur, but he eventually made his home in Baghdad, where he studied under prominent scholars of his time. He studied Hadith under al-Daraqutni, he studied Fiqh under Abu Hamid al-Isfarayini, and he studied Kalam and Hadith under Abu Ishaq al-Isfarayini.

He lived in Baghdad, where he lectured, issued fatwas, and was later appointed as Judge of Judges (Arabic: قاضي القضاة, romanized: Qāḍi al-Quḍāt) in 436/1044–1045 and kept the position until his death. It is reported that he won numerous debates with the Hanafis. Abu al-Tayyib's place in the century's intellectual heritage has been amply demonstrated by al-Maqrizi: Abu Hamid was the first Shafiʿite leader, followed by Abu al-Tayyib. Two of Abu al-Tayyib's prominent students, Abu Ishaq al-Shirazi and Ibn al-Sabbagh, who were rivals during the founding of the Nizamiyya of Baghdad in 459/1066–67, perpetuated the Shafiʿite leadership. His other renowned students include the hadith scholar and historian, al-Khatib al-Baghdadi and the Maliki jurist, hadith scholar and theologian, Abu al-Walid al-Baji.

Abu al-Tayyib was an accomplished scholar with a mastery of various sciences. Numerous scholars in the fields of jurisprudence and hadith graduated from his hands. However, his talents did not end there. He was also a skilled poet who composed poetry in an engaging style and with simple language. However, his poems did not receive the same attention as others.

He died in 1058 at the age of 102, still productive and said to be in full possession of his mental and physical powers. The elders of Baghdad participated in his funeral ceremony and his body was buried in the western side of Baghdad near the tomb of Ahmad ibn Hanbal.

== Reception ==
Al-Khatib al-Baghdadi said: “Our Sheikh Abu al-Tayyib was pious, sane, knowledgeable of the principles and branches, of good character, and of sound doctrine. I went to him and studied jurisprudence from him for years.”

Al-Khatib narrated from Muhammad ibn Ahmad al-Mu'addeb said: “I heard Abu Muhammad al-Bafi said: Abu al-Tayyib al-Tabari is more knowledgable in jurisprudence than Abu Hamid al-Isfarayini, and I heard Abu Hamid say: Abu al-Tayyib is more knowledgable in jurisprudence than Abu Muhammad al-Bafi.”

== Works ==
The fact that Iraqi Shafiʿite writers frequently refer to him as “The Qadhi” is a testament to the renown of his writings. Abu al-Tayyib wrote several works on legal topics, two of which are still in existence.

- Sharh Mukhtasar al-Muzani ("Explanation of Abridgement by al-Muzani"), is an early major jurisprudential work in 25 volumes.
- Rawzat al-Montaha fi Mawled al-Imam al-Shafi'i

== Bibliography ==
- Brown, Jonathan (30 September 2007). The Canonization of Al-Bukhārī and Muslim The Formation and Function of the Sunnī Ḥadīth Canon. Brill. p. 188. ISBN 9789047420347.
- Malik, Hamza (2 October 2018). The Grey Falcon: The Life and Teaching of Shaykh ʿAbd Al-Qādir Al-Jīlānī. Brill. p. 57. ISBN 9789004383692.
- Sarrió Cucarella, Diego (2012). "Corresponding Across Religious Borders: Al-Bājī's Response to a Missionary Letter from France". Medieval Encounters. 18: 1–35. doi:10.1163/157006712X634549.
- Wakin, Jeanette (May 24, 2018) [December 15, 1983]. "Abu'l-Tayyeb Ṭabarī". In Yarshater, Ehsan (ed.). Encyclopædia Iranica. Vol. I/3: Ablution, Islamic–Abū Manṣūr Heravı̄ (Online ed.). Encyclopædia Iranica Foundation. p. 390.
