= Ibn Rajab =

14th-century Islamic scholar

Imam Ibn Rajab
- ابن رجب
- Title: Zain al-Din; Al-Ḥāfiẓ

Personal life
- Born: 4 November 1335 Baghdad
- Died: 14 July 1393 (aged 57) Damascus
- Resting place: Bab al-Saghir Cemetery
- Era: Mamluk period
- Region: Levant and Iraq
- Main interest(s): Hadith sciences, Islamic jurisprudence, History, Islamic theology
- Occupation: Scholar, Jurist, Traditionist, Historian, Theologian, Preacher

Religious life
- Religion: Islam
- Denomination: Sunni
- Jurisprudence: Hanbali
- Creed: Athari

Muslim leader
- Influenced by: Ahmad bin Hanbal Al-Nawawi Ibn Taymiyya Ibn Qayyim al-Jawziyya Salah al-Din al-Ala'i Zain al-Din al-Iraqi Ibn Abd al-Hadi
- Influenced: Ibn Hajar al-Asqalani

Zayn al-Dīn ʿAbd al-Raḥmān ibn Aḥmad ibn ʿAbd al-Raḥmān ibn al-Ḥasan ibn Muḥammad ibn ʿAbd al-Barakāt Masʿūd al-Sulamī al-Ḥanbalī al-Baghdādī al-Dimashqī (Arabic: زين الدين عبد الرحمن بن أحمد بن عبد الرحمن بن الحسن بن محمد بن عبد البركات مسعود السلمي الحنبلي البغدادي الدمشقي.), commonly known as Ibn Rajab (Arabic: ابن رجب; 736-795 AH/ 1335–1393 CE), was a Sunni scholar. He was a prominent Hanbali jurist, traditionist, historian, theologian and preacher. He was also associated with the Qadiri Sufi order.

== Early life ==
=== Birth ===
He was born in Baghdad in Rabiʿ al-Awwal 736 (November 1335). He became known as Ibn Rajab in reference to his grandfather, who was nicknamed Rajab because of the month in which he was born.

=== Education ===
He received his first education from his father and grandfather, both of whom were ḥadīth scholars. According to his own statement, he attended the lectures of ʿAbd al-Raḥīm b. ʿAbd Allāh al-Zarīrānī at the Mujāhidiyya Madrasa in Baghdad while still a child—too young, as he said, to fully appreciate the scholar’s worth. Encouraged by his father, he joined scholarly gatherings in Baghdad even at a young age, studying under such scholars as Ṣafī al-Dīn Ibn ʿAbd al-Ḥaqq al-Baghdādī, and Abū ʿAbd Allāh Muḥammad b. Aḥmad al-Tilī al-Dimashqī, from whom he received ijāzas (certificates of transmission).

In 744 (1343), he travelled with his father to Damascus, where he received ijāzas from the ḥadīth scholars Ibn al-Naqīb al-Miṣrī and ʿAlāʾ al-Dīn Aḥmad b. ʿAbd al-Muʾmin al-Subkī. He also studied ḥadīth with Muḥammad b. Ismāʿīl al-Ḥabbāz and Ibrāhīm b. Dāwūd al-ʿAṭṭār. He later went to Nablus, where he studied under pupils of Ḥāfiẓ Ibn Badrān, and afterward to Jerusalem, where he attended the ḥadīth lectures of the eminent Salāh al-Dīn al-ʿAlāʾī.

In 748 (1347), he returned to Baghdad with his father, and during this time he studied ḥadīth with Abū al-Maʿālī Muḥammad b. ʿAbd al-Razzāq al-Shaybānī. The following year, he performed the pilgrimage with his father, and in Mecca he heard the Thulāthiyyāt of al-Bukhārī from Abū Ḥafs ʿUmar. Upon returning to Damascus, he became a pupil of Ibn Qayyim al-Jawziyya and remained under his instruction until the latter's death.

He later travelled to Cairo, where he joined the ḥadīth circles of Ibn al-Mulūk and Muḥammad b. Muḥammad b. Abī al-Ḥaram al-Qalānisī. In 763 (1362), he performed the pilgrimage again. Among his teachers were Zayn al-Dīn al-ʿIrāqī, Ibn ʿAbd al-Hādī, Fakhr al-Dīn ʿUthmān b. Yūsuf al-Nūrī, Abū ʿAbd Allāh Muḥammad b. ʿAbd al-ʿAzīz al-Warrāq, and ʿAlāʾ al-Dīn ʿAlī b. Zayn al-Dīn al-Munajjā.

== Scholarly life ==
Eventually settling in Damascus, Ibn Rajab succeeded his teacher Ibn Qāḍī al-Jabal after the latter’s death (771/1370), taking over his gatherings. After the death of Ibn al-Taqī (788/1386), he began teaching at the Ḥanbaliyya Madrasa. He also preached at the ʿUmariyya al-Shaykhiyya and Turbat al-ʿIzziyya madrasas.

Ibn Rajab was a devout and ascetic figure, known for his mastery of ḥadīth, his deep knowledge of the virtues of the Salaf, and his eloquent and moving sermons. Detached from worldly affairs and avoiding contact with political authorities, he devoted himself to teaching and writing at the Sukkariyya Madrasa in the Qassāʾīn district. He trained numerous students, including Muḥammad b. Aḥmad al-Maqdisī, Ibn al-Laḥḥām, Ibn al-Rassām, ʿAbd al-Raḥmān b. Aḥmad b. ʿAyyāsh, Qāḍī al-Quḍāt Abū al-Faḍl Muḥibb al-Dīn Aḥmad b. Naṣr Allāh al-Baghdādī, and Abū Dharr ʿAbd al-Raḥmān b. Muḥammad al-Miṣrī.

== Death ==
He died in Damascus on 4 Ramaḍān 795 (14 July 1393) and was buried in the Bab al-Saghir Cemetery. His tomb remains one of the city's known visitation sites. Some sources, however, record his death month as Rajab.

== Reception ==
Ibn Qadi Shuhbah said: “He read and became proficient in the various fields of science. He engrossed himself with the issues of the madhhab until he mastered it. He devoted himself to the occupation of knowledge of the texts, defects and meanings of the hadith.”

Ibn Hajar al-Asqalani said: “He was highly proficient in the science of hadith in terms of the names of reporters, their biographies, their paths of narration and awareness of their meanings.”

Ibn Muflih: “He is the Shaykh, the great scholar, the Hafiz, the ascetic, the Shaykh of the Hanbali madhhab and he authored many beneficial works.”

== Works ==
=== Tafsir and Qur'anic studies ===
- Tafsir Surah al-Ikhlaas
- Tafsir Surah al-Faatihah
- Tafsir Surah an-Nasr
- I'raab al-Bismillah
- Al-Istighnaa bil-Qur'an

=== Hadith studies and explanations ===
- Sharh al-Tirmidhi
- Fath al-Bari bi Sharh Sahih al-Bukhari (An incomplete commentary on Sahih Bukhari)
- Jami' al-'Uloom wal-Hikam fi Sharh khamsina Hadithan min Jawami al-Kalim, considered one of the best and largest commentaries on Al-Nawawi's Forty Hadith.
- Maa Dhi'bani Ja'iaan ursilaa fi Ghanam
- Ikhtiyaar al-Awlaa fi Sharh Hadith Ikhtisaam al-Mala al-A'alaa
- Noor al-Iqtibas fi Mishkaat Wasiyyat an-Nabi Libn Abbas ( Explanation of the advice of the Prophet to Ibn 'Abbas )
- Ghayat an-Nafa fi Sharh Hadith Tamthil al-Mu'min bi Khamat az-Zara
- Kashf al-Kurbah fi Wasfi Hali Ahl al-Ghurbah ( Alleviating Grieviances in Describing the Condition of the Strangers )

=== Fiqh ===
- Al-Istikhraj fi Ahkam al-Kharaj
- Al-Qawa'id al-Fiqhiyyah
- Kitab Ahkam al-Khawatim wa ma yat'alaqu biha

=== Biographical and historical accounts ===
- Adh-Dhayl 'alaa Tabaqat al-Hanabilah
- Mukhtasar Sirah Umar ibn 'Abd al-'Aziz
- Sirah 'Abd al-Malik ibn Umar ibn 'Abd al-'Aziz

=== Other ===
- Lata'if al-Ma'arif fima li Mawasim al-Aam min al-Wadha'if
- At-Takhweef min an-Naar wat-Ta'reef bi Hali Dar al-Bawar
- Al-Farq bayna an-Nasihah wat-Ta'yir ( The difference between advising and condemning )
- Ahwal Ahl al-Quboor
- Fadhl 'Ilm Al-Salaf 'alā'l-Khalaf ( The superiority of the knowledge of the predecessors over the knowledge of the successors )

== See also ==
- Hanbali Scholars
