= Abu Ya'la ibn al-Farra' =

11th-century Islamic jurist

- Title: al-Qāḍī, Rukn al-Madhhab (ركن المذهب) (Pillar of the Madhhab), Shaykh al-Hanabilah (شيخ الحنابلة) (Shaykh of the Hanabila)

Personal life
- Born: 380 A.H / 990 C.E.
- Died: 458 A.H / 1066 C.E.
- Era: Golden Age of Islam
- Main interest(s): Fiqh, Aqidah, principles of Islamic jurisprudence
- Notable work(s): al-Mu'tamad Fī Usūl al-Dīn, al-Aḥkām al-Sulṭāniyya, Ibtal al-Tawilat

Religious life
- Religion: Islam
- Denomination: Sunni
- School: Hanbali
- Creed: Athari

Muslim leader
- Influenced by: Ahmad ibn Hanbal al-Barbahari
- Influenced: Ibn Taymiyya, virtually all later Hanbali scholars.

Abū Yaʿlā Muḥammad ibn al-Ḥusayn Ibn al-Farrāʾ (April 990 – 15 August 1066), commonly known as al-Qāḍī Abū Yaʿlā or simply as Ibn al-Farrāʾ, was a Hanbali Jurist, Athari theologian.

Abu Ya'la was a Mujtahid scholar, judge, and one of the early Muslim jurists who played dynamic roles in formulating a systematic legal framework and constitutional theory on Islamic system of government during the first half of 11th century in Baghdad.

== Works ==
al-Qāḍī Abū Yaʿlā authored many works, including:

- Kitāb al-Muʿtamad fī Uṣūl al-Dīn
- al-Aḥkām al-Sulṭāniyya
- Ibṭāl al-Taʾwīlāt li-Aḫbār al-Sifāt
- al-ʿUdda fī Uṣūl al-Fiqh

== See also ==
- Hanbali
- List of Islamic scholars
