= List of Arabic dictionaries =

Following are lists of notable Arabic dictionaries.

== Explanatory dictionaries ==
Title	Author	Date	Vocabulary	Notes
Kitab al-'Ayn (Note: The name means "Book of the Ayn (Letter)".) (Arabic: كتاب العين)	Al-Khalil ibn Ahmad al-Farahidi (Arabic: الخليل بن أحمد الفراهيدي) (b. 718 - d. 791)	8th century		Kitab al-Ayn was the first dictionary for the Arabic language.
Kitab al-Jim (Note: The name means "Book of the Jim (Letter)".) (Arabic: كتاب الجيم) a.k.a. Kitab al-Lughat or Kitab al-Huruf	Abu Amr al-Shaybani (Arabic: أبو عمرو الشيباني) (b. ca. 738 - d. 828)	8-9th century		The only copy is in the El Escorial Library.
Al-Jamhara al-Lugha (Note: The name means "Collection of Language".) (Arabic: جمهرة اللغة) a.k.a. Al-Jamhara fi al-Lugha (The all-embracing in language)	Ibn Duraid (Arabic: ابن دريد) (b. 838 - d. 933)	9-10th century		The dictionary was inspired in part by the earlier dictionary Kitab al-Ayn of al-Farahidi.
Tahdhib al-Lugha (Note: The name means "Refinement of Language".) (Arabic: تهذيب اللغة)	Abu Manshur al-Azhari al-Harawi (Arabic: أبو منصور الأزهري الهروي) (b. 895 - d. 981)	10th century		The dictionary is important as a source of the Lisan al-Arab.
Al-Muhit fi al-Lugha (Note: The name means "Surrounding of The Language".) (Arabic: المحيط في اللغة)	Al-Sahib ibn Abbad (Arabic: الصاحب بن عبّاد) (b. 938 - d. 995)	10th century		
Taj al-Lugha wa Sihah al-Arabiyya (Note: The name means "The crown of Language and the authentic of Arabic".) (Arabic: تاج اللغة وصحاح العربية) shorter title: Taj al-Lugha or al-Sihah	Ismail ibn Hammad al-Jawhari (Arabic: إسماعيل بن حماد الجوهري) (b. ? - d. 1009)	10-11th century	It contains about 40,000 dictionary entries.	The author died at Nishapur while attempting flight.
Mu`jam Maqayis al-Lugha(Arabic: معجم مقاييس اللغة; "Language Standards Compendium)	Ahmad Ibn Zakariyya al-Qazwini Ibn Faris	11th century		
Al-Muhkam wa al-Muhit al-A'zam (Note: The name means "The arbitrator and the Great Ocean".) (Arabic: المحكم والمحيط الأعظم) shorter title: Al-Muhkam	Ibn Sidah (Arabic: ابن سيده) (b. 1007 - d. 1066)	11th century		The author was a blind man.
Lisan al-Arab (Note: The name means "The tongue of the Arabs".) (Arabic: لسان العرب)	Ibn Manzur (Arabic: ابن منظور) (b. 1233 - d. 1312)	The dictionary was completed in 1290.	It contains about 80,000 dictionary entries.	
Al-Misbah al-munir(Arabic: المصباح المنير ; "The Enlightening Lamp")	Ahmed Al Maqri Ahmed bin Mohammed bin Ali Al Maqri Al Fayoumi	The dictionary dates to 1368		
Al-Qamus al-Muhit wa al-Qabus al-Wasit (Note: Al-Qamus al-Muhit means "The surrounding Ocean".) (Note: The Qamus - which may be derived from Greek okeanos became, and has remained, the commonest Arabic word for dictionary.) (Arabic: القاموس المحيط، والقابوس الوسيط; "The Encompassing Ocean/Lexicon") shorter title: Al-Qamus al-Muhit	Al-Firuzabadi (Arabic: الفيروزآبادي) (b. 1329 - d. 1414)	The dictionary was completed in 1410.	It contains about 60,000 dictionary entries.	The dictionary served as the basis of later European dictionaries of Arabic.
Ahkam Bab al-I`rab `n Lughat al-A`rab (Arabic: أحكام باب الإعراب عن لغة الأعراب)	Germanus Farhat (1670–1732)	Printed by Rashid Dahdah (1813–1889)		A revision of Fairuzabadi’s Al-Qamus Al-Muheet. Arranged by word ending.
Taj al-'Arus min Jawahir al-Qamus (Note: The name means "The bride's crown from the pearls of the Qamus (Ocean)".) (Arabic: تاج العروس) shorter title: Taj al-Arus	Abu al-Fayd Mohammad Murtada al-Zabidi (Arabic: أبو الفيض محمد مرتضى الزبيدي b. 1731 - d. 1790)	The dictionary was completed in 1774.	It contains about 120,000 dictionary entries.	
Muhit al-Muhit (Note: The name means "Circumference of the Ocean".) (Arabic: محيط المحيط) a.k.a. Qutr al-Muhit (The Diameter of the Ocean)	Butrus al-Bustani (Arabic: بطرس البستاني) (b. 1819 - d. 1883)	The dictionary was completed in 1870.		The author had dedicated the work to the Sultan Abdulaziz. The sultan awarded him with a higher medal and 250 golden liras.
Al-Faraed Al-Hissan Min Qalaed Al-Lisan (Arabic: الفرائد الحسان من قلائد اللسان)	Ibrahim al-Yaziji (Arabic: إبراهيم اليازجي; b. 1847 - d. 1907)	1870		
Matn al-Lugha (Corpus of the language)	Ahmad Rida (Arabic: أحمد رضا) (b. 1872 - d. 1953)	1958		
Lexicon of the Modern Arabic Language (Arabic: معجم اللغة العربية المعاصرة)	Ahmad Mukhtar Omar	2008		

== Bilingual dictionaries ==
Influential Arabic dictionaries in Europe:

- Pedro de Alcalá, Vocabulista, 1505. A Spanish-Arabic glossary in transcription only.
- Valentin Schindler, Lexicon Pentaglotton: Hebraicum, Chaldicum, Syriacum, Talmudico-Rabbinicum, et Arabicum, 1612. Arabic lemmas were printed in Hebrew characters.
- Franciscus Raphelengius, Lexicon Arabicum, Leiden 1613. The first printed dictionary of the Arabic language in Arabic characters.
- Jacobus Golius, Lexicon Arabico-Latinum, Leiden 1653. The dominant Arabic dictionary in Europe for almost two centuries.
- Georg Freytag, Lexicon Arabico-Latinum, praesertim ex Djeuharii Firuzubadiique et aliorum libris confectum I–IV, Halle 1830–1837
- Edward William Lane, Arabic–English Lexicon, 8 vols, London-Edinburgh 1863–1893. Highly influential, but incomplete (stops at Kaf)
- Albert Kazimirski de Biberstein, Dictionnaire arabe-français contenant toutes les racines de la langue arabe, Tome 1 (1846) & 2 (1850), G.-P. Maisonneuve (Paris).

Influential Arabic dictionaries in modern usage:

- English: Collins Dictionaries, Collins Essential - Arabic Essential Dictionary, Collins, Glasgow 2018.
- English: Lahlali, El Mustapha & Tajul Islam, A Dictionary of Arabic Idioms and Expressions: Arabic-English Translation, Edinburgh University Press, Edinburgh 2024.
- English: Oxford Languages, Oxford Arabic Dictionary, Oxford University Press, Oxford, 2014.
- French: R. Blachère, C. Pellat, M. Chouémi, and C. Denizeau, Dictionnaire arabe-français-anglais (langues classique et moderne), Paris 1967 ff.
- French: D. Reig, As-Sabil, Dictionnaire arabe- français, français-arabe, Larousse, Paris, 1984.
- German (Classical Arabic): M. Ullmann, Wörterbuch der klassischen arabischen Sprache I, kāf, Wiesbaden 1970; II/1-4, lām, Wiesbaden 1984–2009. Missing mīm, nūn, hā’, wāw, and yā’.
- German (Modern Standard Arabic): Hans Wehr, Arabisches Wörterbuch für die Schriftsprache der Gegenwart. Arabisch-Deutsch, Wiesbaden 1952; 5th ed., 1985.
  - English (translation of Hans Wehr): J Milton Cowan: Dictionary of Modern Written Arabic. Arabic-English, Wiesbaden 1971; 4th ed., 1979.
- Greek: G. Endress (ed.), A Greek and Arabic Lexicon, Leiden 1992 ff.
- Polish: J. Kozłowska and J. Danecki, Słownik arabsko-polski, Warszawa 1996 and J. Łacina, Słownik arabsko-polski, Poznań 1997.
- Russian: Х.К. Баранов, Арабско-русский словарь, Moscow 1957; 6th ed., 1985.

== Online dictionaries ==
- Alankaa
- Almaany
- معجم الرياض للغة العربية المعاصرة
- معجم الدوحة التاريخي للغة العربية
- المعجم التاريخي للغة العربية

== See also ==
- Dictionary
- List of Dutch dictionaries
- List of French dictionaries
- List of German dictionaries
- Dictionary of Modern Written Arabic (Arabic-English/German dictionary)
- List of Arabic encyclopedias
