= Almaany =

Online dictionary

- Website type: Dictionary
- Available in: Arabic
- Website: www.almaany.com

Almaany (Arabic: المعاني 'The Meanings') is a free online Arabic dictionary. According to The Routledge Course on Media, Legal and Technical Translation, Almaany has more than thirty different search domains, including accounting, agriculture, computer, social, legal, et cetera. It has Arabic to English translations and English to Arabic, as well as a significant quantity of technical terminology. It is useful to translators as its search results are given in context. Almaany offers correspondent meanings for Arabic terms with semantically similar words and is widely used in Arabic language research. Researchers such as Touahri and Mazroui have used Almaany to "explain difficult meaning lemmas" in their published results.

Almaany is one of the most recently developed Arabic dictionaries and is continually updated. Its Arabic service amalgamates entries from dictionaries including Lisan al-Arab compiled by Ibn Manzur in 1290, al-Qāmūs al-Muḥīṭ by Firuzabadi in the 15th century, and ar-Rāʾid published by Jibran Masud in 1964. It is comprehensive and, according to Ekhlas Ali Mohsin of Newcastle University, it "provides all existing Arabic words with their etymology, derivatives, and diacritization".

It also has bilingual dictionaries of Arabic with English, French, Portuguese, Spanish, Turkish, Persian, Indonesian, German, Urdu, and Russian. Mahmoud Altarabin, assistant professor of translation and linguistics at Islamic University of Gaza, notes that while the machine translation of online translation platforms such as Almaany, Reverso Context, and Google Translate may be used to render translations of single phrases or words, those results should be edited to ensure that they accurately indicate their meaning in the source language. Unlike some platforms such as Google Translate, Almaany classifies Arabic versions of English words according to specific domains such as financial, legal or technical, for example. Haddad's Introduction to Arabic Linguistics, an introductory-level university textbook published by Wiley, cites Almaany as one of four dictionaries consulted for accuracy.

The Almaany Dictionary website is an Arab project launched in 2010, with contributions from various countries including Jordan, Turkey, Egypt, and India. It employs linguists, translators, and developers from Arab regions besides the core team in Jordan. It is owned and controlled by Atef Sharaya, who has a Masters degree in Communications Engineering from Brazil, and engages in translation work between Arabic and Portuguese. The site is educational and offers language services for Arabic speakers. Among these are searches of monolingual Arabic language dictionaries, generation of Arabic synonyms and antonyms, linguistic analysis of words in the Qur' an corpus, lists of common Arabic sayings and proverbs, and searches for Arabic equivalents in supported bilingual dictionaries. Search results are presented as a bilingual Arabic–English alphabetical list in which a word or a phrase is shown in sentence context. As of 2020, its database consisted of 12 million texts translated by humans into Arabic, derived from various sources such as public documents, certified translations of the Qur' an, and United Nations translations. Research conducted by Mufarokah et al found that 100 percent of female teachers at Ar-Raayah University in Indonesia use the Almaany (Al-Ma'ani) lexicon in teaching Arabic and in analyzing linguistic errors in the writing of language students.
