= Muhit =

Muhit may refer to:

== Literature ==
- Al-Bahr al-Muhit, classical Sunni commentary of the Qur'an, authored by Abu Hayyan al-Gharnati
- Al-Muḥkam wa-al-muḥīt al-aʻẓam, Arabic-language dictionary compiled by Ibn Sidah (1007 to 1066)
- Al-Qāmūs al-Muḥīṭ, Arabic dictionary compiled by the lexicographer and linguist, Firuzabadi (1329–1414)
- Al-Yawm al-Muhit, a name mentioned in the Qur'an to refer to the Judgement Day in Islam
- Muhit al-Muhit, early modern Arabic dictionary written by the Lebanese writer and scholar, Butrus al-Bustani (1819–1883)

== People ==
- M. A. Muhit (born 1969), Bangladeshi politician
- Abul Maal Abdul Muhith (1934–2022), Bangladeshi economist, writer, civil servant, secretary, diplomat and politician
