= Al-Sharekh =

Al-Sharekh or Alsharekh (Arabic: الشارخ) is an Arabic surname. Notable people with the surname include:

- Alanoud Alsharekh (fl. 1992–present), Kuwaiti women's rights activist
- Fahad Al-Sharekh (fl. 1996–present), Kuwaiti venture capitalist
- Mohammed Al-Sharekh (1942–2024), Kuwaiti businessman and author, father of Alanoud and Fahad

== See also ==
- Sharekh, a village in Sistan and Baluchestan province, Iran
