= Mohammed Al-Sharekh =

Kuwaiti businessman and author (1942–2024)

- محمد الشارخ
- Born: 1942; Kuwait City, Kuwait
- Died: 6 March 2024 (aged 81)
- Other name: Abu Fahd
- Education: Cairo University; Williams College
- Occupations: Businessperson, writer
- Years active: 1969–2024
- Known for: MSX Sakhr
- Children: 4, including Fahad and Alanoud

Mohammed Al-Sharekh (Arabic: محمد الشارخ; 1942 – 6 March 2024) was a Kuwaiti businessman and author, who was the founder and Chairman Emeritus of Sakhr Software Company. Through Sakhr, he introduced the first Arabic language operating system into computers.

== Background ==
Al-Sharekh was born in Kuwait in 1942. He earned his bachelor's degree in economics and political science from Cairo University in 1965, and his master's degree in development economics in 1968 from Williams College in Massachusetts, United States.

Al-Sharekh died on 6 March 2024, at the age of 81.

== Career ==
Al-Sharekh served as the Deputy Director-General for the Kuwait Fund for Arab Economic Development from 1969 to 1973, as a representative of Kuwait and Arab Group of the International Bank for Reconstruction and Development (I.B.R.D), Washington D.C. from 1973 to 1975 and co-founded and chaired the Board of Directors of the Industrial Bank of Kuwait, he also served as Vice Chairman of the Association of Arab Economists. In 1980, he founded AlAlamiah Group with headquarters in Kuwait and the Kingdom of Saudi Arabia and established Sakhr Software Company as a project to introduce the Arabic language into computers in 1982. Upon that, they worked on the research and development of Arabic NLP (Natural Language Processing) which led to the development of the Arabic OCR, Arabic machine translation, and Arabic automatic speech recognition. In 1997, Al-Sharekh founded Book in a Newspaper project in collaboration with UNESCO. In 1987, he was one of the financiers of the Center for Arab Unity Studies and the Arab Organization for Translation, and the Institut du Monde Arabe in 1987. Al-Sharekh developed the first Quran computer software, in addition to the nine Hadith books software in English, the Islamic Information Archive, OCR in 1994, Arabic Text to Speech in 1998, Machine translation from and into Arabic in 2002, automatic speech translation in 2010 and developing more than 90 educational and coding programs for the Arab youth.

=== Sakhr Software Company ===
In 1982, Al-Sharekh established Sakhr Software Company as a Kuwaiti subsidiary of AlAlamiah Group, which moved its headquarters to Cairo during the invasion of Kuwait in 1990. The company developed a new generation of Arabic Natural Language Processing (NLP) techniques that were used in the development of automated morphology and automatic diacritizer which took over 10 years for completion. The company obtained three patents from the USPTO in the field of Arabic language for automatic pronunciation, automatic translation and OCR.

=== Contemporary Arabic Lexicon ===
Contemporary Arabic Lexicon is a contemporary computerized dictionary of the Arabic language, which was released online for free in 2019, contains 125,000 meanings and structures, as well as a database amounting to 35,000 synonyms and antonyms. The website also includes three dictionaries which are Al-Qāmūs al-Muḥīṭ, Taj al-Arus and Lisān al-ʿArab.

=== AlSharekh Archives ===
The archive consists of 250 magazines with 13,000 issues that were issued from the late 19th century until 2010. It also includes more than 250,000 articles of various topics by 20,000 writers from Arab and non-Arab countries.

=== Biopic ===
In Katara Studios has announced a biopic titled "Sakhr," focusing on the late Kuwaiti entrepreneur. The film aims to celebrate Al-Sharekh's significant contributions to Arabic computing and technology, highlighting his legacy in a region where most software was originally designed for English speakers.

== Patents ==
During his tenure, Sakhr Software Company obtained three patents from the United States Patent and Trademark Office:

- Arabic handwriting recognition using feature matching.
- Determining a compact model to transcribe the Arabic language acoustically in a well defined basic phonetic study.
- Method and system for theme-based word sense ambiguity reduction.

== Achievements and awards ==
- King Faisal International Prize — 2021
- State Prize, the National Council for Culture, Arts, and Letters (NCCAL) — 2018
- World Summit Awards — 2007
- E-Inclusion Award — 2007
- Outstanding Contribution to Arabization Award at GITEX 2005, "in recognition of his efforts in leading the Arabic language into the age of technology, and in annealing technology to the needs of the Arabic language."
- Foundation Pioneer Award — 2004
- E-Achievement Award E-Visionary of the Year, Arabian Business — 2002
- The best products award, Comdex's exhibition, Egypt — 1998
- Gulf Success Forum Award — 1996

== Private holdings ==
Al-Sharekh had many private holdings that consisted of paintings from Arabian and Egyptian art by several well-known Arab and non-Arab artists; according to the Kuwaiti newspaper, Al-Jarida, his art collection is sufficient to establish a private museum.

== Published works ==
In 1968, Al-Sharekh published his first work, "Qais and Laila", in the avant-garde 1960s magazine Gallery and had three published short stories, Ten Stories published in 2006, Al-Saha published in 2012, and Secrets published in 2017, and a novel entitled The Family published in 2018.
