= Al-Nihaya fi al-Gharib al-Hadith =

Arabic dictionary on Hadith

Al-Nihaya fi al-Gharib al-Hadith wa al-Athar
- Author: Majd ad-Dīn Ibn Athir
- Original title: النِّهاية في غريب الحديث والأثر
- Language: Arabic
- Subject: Hadith
- Genre: Arabic dictionary

Al-Nihaya fi al-Gharib al-Hadith wa al-Athar (Arabic: النِّهاية في غريب الحديث والأثر, lit. 'The End in the Rare Words of the Hadith and the Traditions') is an Arabic dictionary by Majd ad-Dīn Ibn Athir that explains the meaning of obscure words found in the sayings and traditions of the Prophet Muhammad (hadith) and their actions (athar). The book is a key reference for understanding difficult terms in Islamic texts and is widely regarded as the most authoritative work in the field of Gharib al-Hadith, a specialized linguistic branch of hadith field.

== Background ==
Its full title is al-Nihāya fī gharīb al-ḥadīth wa al-athar. The author gave it the title al-Nihāya ("The Ultimate") because it encompasses the contents of all previously written works in the field of gharīb al-ḥadīth (rare or obscure expressions found in hadith).

Up to the time it was written, the most authoritative works in this field were considered to be: Gharīb al-ḥadīth by Abū ʿUbayd al-Qāsim b. Sallām and al-Khaṭṭābī, Kitāb al-Gharībayn by Aḥmad b. Muḥammad al-Harawī, al-Fāʾiq fī gharīb al-ḥadīth by al-Zamakhshari, and Majmūʿ al-mughīth fī gharībay al-Qurʾān wa’l-ḥadīth by Abū Mūsā al-Madīnī. Some of these works arranged hadiths according to the musnad order, while others explained rare words occurring in both the Qur’an and the hadith. Each of these works, however, had certain methodological and structural difficulties that made them less accessible.

In the introduction to al-Nihāya, Ibn al-Athīr discusses the origin and development of gharīb al-ḥadīth studies and the methods used in earlier works, stating that he sought to compensate for their deficiencies in his own compilation. He organized the book alphabetically according to the first three letters of each word, and arranged chapter headings by the first two letters. Ibn al-Athīr frequently quotes from Ibn Qutayba, al-Khaṭṭābī, and especially al-Zamakhsharī. While he usually cites his sources, he occasionally quotes without attribution and sometimes critiques his sources.

== Methodology ==
Ibn al-Athīr based his work primarily on the most comprehensive of these, namely al-Harawī's Kitāb al-Gharībayn, as well as Abū Mūsā al-Madīnī's work, which had been written to complement it. Drawing on these, Ibn al-Athīr confined himself to explaining obscure words found only in hadiths. In addition, he incorporated rare words found in hadiths and reports (athar) that he compiled from various other sources. After merging the entries and hadiths from the two aforementioned works, he eliminated repetitions and added further rare expressions that he located in other hadith collections. In al-Nihāya, Ibn al-Athīr used the abbreviation “hāʾ” (هـ) for the hadiths taken from al-Harawī and “sīn” (س) for those taken from Abū Mūsā, while marking his own additions with no special symbol. However, the editors Ṭāhir Aḥmad al-Zāwī and Maḥmūd Muḥammad al-Ṭanāḥī placed an asterisk (*) before the author's own additions.

In al-Nihāyah fī Gharīb al-Ḥadīth wa al-Athar, Ibn al-Athīr addressed the phenomenon of antonymy (al-aḍdād) through approximately one hundred lexical entries containing words with opposite meanings. His methodology involved tracing these terms within the corpus of Prophetic traditions (ḥadīth) and early reports (āthār), explaining how context determined their intended sense. Ibn al-Athīr identified the linguistic environments in which such antonymous expressions occurred, clarified their semantic origins, and noted the reasons for their development and usage. The treatment of al-aḍdād in the work reflects a broader lexicographical approach that combines linguistic analysis with contextual interpretation, emphasizing the role of usage and narration in defining meaning.

In al-Nihāya, Ibn al-Athīr goes beyond mere lexical explanation. He occasionally demonstrates his scholarly insight by clarifying issues related to the hadiths in which the word occurs, explaining juristic disagreements and discussing the views of various schools of law, and reconciling apparently contradictory hadiths. He also devotes considerable attention to grammatical debates and sometimes expresses opinions contrary to the grammarians.

== Abridgements and supplements ==
Several abridgements (mukhtaṣar), supplements (zayl), and versified adaptations (naẓm) have been made of al-Nihāya. Among the abridgements, al-Suyūṭī's al-Durr al-nathīr talkhīṣ Nihāyat Ibn al-Athīr in which he omits the hadith texts and retains only the rare words with explanations—is the most well-known (Cairo 1322, printed in the margins of al-Nihāya). ʿĪsā b. Muḥammad b. ʿUbayd Allāh al-Ṣafawī also produced a partial abridgement, reducing the work by about half, while al-Muttaqī al-Hindī likewise made an abridged version. Ṣalāḥ al-Dīn al-Ḥifnī also prepared a shortened edition entitled Mukhtaṣar al-Nihāya fī gharīb al-ḥadīth wa’l-athar (Kuwait 1406 / Cairo 1411).

Among the supplements are Dhail al-Nihāya by Ṣafiyy al-Dīn Maḥmūd b. Abū Bakr Muḥammad al-Urmawī and al-Suyūṭī's al-Tadhyīl wa’l-tathnīb ʿalā Nihāyat al-gharīb, an expansion of his own al-Durr al-nathīr by about seven folios (ed. ʿAbd Allāh al-Jubūrī, Riyadh 1402/1982–1403/1983). Ibn Bardīs versified the work in his two-volume al-Kifāya fī ikhtiṣār (fī naẓm) al-Nihāya. In modern times, Abū ʿAbd Allāh ʿAbd al-Salām b. Muḥammad b. ʿUmar ʿAllūsh wrote two supplements entitled al-ʿInāya bi'l-Nihāya and Fawāt al-Nihāya, which he later combined into a single volume under the title al-Dhayl ʿalā al-Nihāya fī gharīb al-ḥadīth wa’l-athar (Beirut 1417/1997).

== Legacy and influence ==
Al-Nihāyah fī Gharīb al-Ḥadīth wa al-Āthar by Ibn al-Athīr al-Jazarī stands as one of the most significant scholarly achievements of the 6th century AH. The work played a vital role in advancing the study of the Arabic language and deepening the understanding of the Prophet’s hadith. It elucidates numerous obscure terms, explains their linguistic origins, and explores the reasons behind their various usages and evolving meanings. Al-Suyūṭī said: “This is the best books of rare terms (ghareeb), the most complete, best known and most widely used.”

Because al-Nihāya is regarded as one of the major sources on the Arabic language, Ibn Manẓūr relied heavily on it in Lisān al-ʿArab. Al-Nawawī also made frequent use of it in Tahdhib al-Asma wa'l-Lughat and al-Minhāj fī sharḥ Ṣaḥīḥ Muslim, as did Aḥmad b. Muḥammad al-Fayyūmī in al-Miṣbāḥ al-munīr fī gharīb al-Sharḥ al-kabīr, and Murtaḍā al-Zabīdī in Tāj al-ʿarūs.

== Editions ==
The work was first printed in a single volume (lithograph, Tehran 1269 AH), then in four volumes with al-Durr al-nathīr of al-Suyūṭī and corrections by ʿAbd al-ʿAzīz b. Ismāʿīl al-Anṣārī al-Tahtāwī (Cairo 1311). It was later reprinted again in four volumes together with al-Suyūṭī's al-Durr al-nathīr and al-Rāghib al-Iṣfahānī's al-Mufradāt (Cairo 1318, 1322). Although the first page of the first volume of that edition notes that it would also include Abū Aḥmad al-ʿAskarī's Taṣḥīfāt al-muḥaddithīn fī gharīb al-ḥadīth, that work was not actually published. The al-Maṭbaʿa al-ʿUthmāniyya edition (Cairo 1311) is considered the most reliable among the early printings, though, like others, it still contains some typographical errors.

The most accurate critical edition was prepared by Ṭāhir Aḥmad al-Zāwī (who co-edited the first three volumes) and Maḥmūd Muḥammad al-Ṭanāḥī, published in five volumes (Cairo 1383–1385/1963–1965; Beirut 1383/1963; Lahore 1390/1970).

== See also ==
- List of Sunni books

== Sources ==
- Fadel Abd Ahmed (28 February 2023). "The Causes of Naming and the Parts of Clarification in Ibn Al- Atheer's Book Al-Nihaya fi Gharib Al-Hadith wa Al-Athar". Journal of Tikrit University for Humanities. 30 (2). University of Tikrit: 72–91. doi:10.25130/jtuh.30.2.2.2023.05. ISSN 1817-6798.
- Ferhat GÖKÇE (1 October 2017). "Ibn al-Athir's Interpretations of Allah's Names and Attributes in His Work En-Nihâye fî Gharibi'l-Hadith". Manas Journal of Social Studies. 6 (4). Kyrgyz-Turkish Manas University: 163–206. JA66FM22ZS.
- Abdul Rahim Ahmad Ismail (1 July 2021). "Opposites in Kitab (al-Nihaya fi Gharib al-Hadith wa al-Athar) by Ibn al-Atheer al-Jazari". Jurnal Komunikasi antar Perguruan Tinggi Agama Islam. 17 (2). University of Mosul: 507–538. doi:10.33899/berj.2021.168508. eISSN 2664-2808. ISSN 1992-7452.
