= Salah al-Din al-Ala'i =

14th century Sunni polymath

Imam Ṣalāḥ al-Dīn al-ʿAlāʾī
- صلاح الدين العلائي
- Title: Shaykh al-Islām; Ṣalāḥ al-Dīn; Al-Ḥāfiẓ

Personal life
- Born: 1295 Damascus
- Died: 1359 (aged 63–64) Jerusalem
- Resting place: Bab al-Rahma Cemetery
- Era: Mamluk period
- Region: Levant
- Main interest(s): Hadith sciences, Islamic jurisprudence, Principles of Islamic jurisprudence, Tafsir, Islamic theology, History, Genealogy, Arabic grammar, Philology, Arabic literature

Religious life
- Religion: Islam
- Denomination: Sunni
- Jurisprudence: Shafi'i
- Creed: Ash'ari

Muslim leader
- Influenced by: Al-Shafi'i Abu Hasan al-Ash'ari Al-Mizzi Al-Dhahabi
- Influenced: Ibn Kathir Zain al-Din al-Iraqi Ibn al-Mulaqqin Firuzabadi Ibn Rajab

Abū Saʿīd Khalīl b. Kaykaldī b. ʿAbdallāh al-ʿAlāʾī (Arabic: أبو سعيد خليل بن كيكالدي بن عبد الله العلائي), also known as Ṣalāḥ al-Dīn al-ʿAlāʾī (Arabic: صلاح الدين العلائي), was a Sunni polymath of the Mamlūk era. He was a distinguished Shāfiʿī jurist, legal theorist, ḥadīth master, historian, genealogist, Qurʾānic exegete, theologian, grammarian, philologist, poet, and man of letters. He was regarded as one of the most eminent ḥadīth scholars of his time, renowned for his profound mastery of isnād (chains of transmission), matn (textual analysis), rijāl (biographical evaluation of transmitters), and ʿilal (hidden defects in transmission).

== Early life ==
He was born in Damascus (694/1295) as the son of a Turkish soldier and grew up there. At the age of ten, he began studying hadith. He undertook many journeys for learning to major centers of knowledge such as Jerusalem, Mecca, and Egypt. He benefited from more than 700 scholars, among them notable figures like Sharaf al-Din al-Fazārī, Kamāl al-Dīn Ibn al-Zamalkānī, Jamāl al-Dīn al-Mizzī, and al-Dhahabī.

== Scholarly life ==
=== Career ===
He travelled to the Ḥijāz many times for pilgrimage and stayed there for long periods as a resident near the sacred precincts. He taught ḥadīth in the Nāṣiriyya (1318) and Asadiyya (1323) madrasas in Damascus, as well as in the Ṣalāḥiyya (1331) and later the Tankīziyya madrasas in Jerusalem. He authored numerous treatises and delivered a considerable number of legal opinions (fatwas).

=== Students ===
Among his many students were:

- Ibn Kathir
- Zain al-Din al-Iraqi
- Ibn al-Mulaqqin
- Firuzabadi
- Ibn Rajab

== Death ==
Al-ʿAlāʾī dedicated his personal library to the Sümaysātiyya Khānqāh in Damascus. He died in Jerusalem on 5 Muḥarram 761 (27 November 1359). He was buried in the Bāb al-Raḥmah cemetery beside the wall of the Al-Aqsa Mosque.

== Theology ==
Al-ʿAlāʾī is characterized as a committed Shāfiʿī in jurisprudence and an Ashʿarī in creed. According to Ibn al-Subkī, he was involved in certain disputes with Ḥanbalī scholars, though the details are not specified. Although disputes between Shafi'is and Hanbalis in Medieval Damascus were common. Other sources likewise indicate that he engaged in scholarly disagreements with members of the Ḥanbalī school over particular theological and legal matters.

Ṣalāḥ al-Dīn al-ʿAlāʾī authored a treatise titled Al-Aḥādīth al-Wāridah fī Dhikr Ziyārat Qabr al-Nabī ("The Traditions Concerning the Visitation of the Prophet’s Tomb"), written as a refutation of Ibn Taymiyyah's opposition to the practice of ziyāra (visiting the Prophet's grave). The work compiles traditions that affirm or otherwise support the visitation of the Prophet's sepulchre. Al-ʿAlāʾī was closely associated with other scholars who likewise composed written rebuttals to Ibn Taymiyyah's views.

Al-ʿAlāʾī presents a respectful yet firm critique of his teacher al-Dhahabī. He acknowledges that al-Dhahabī was pious, and sincere, yet he often displayed bias in his evaluations, leaning toward the Ḥanbalī creed while showing unfairness in his judgment, particularly toward the Ashʿarīs, whom al-ʿAlāʾī regarded as among those who preserved and advanced the Islamic sciences through their scholarship and defense of orthodoxy. He laments that al-Dhahabī's zeal at times led him to exaggerate the faults of the ulama while diminishing their immense contribution. Out of deep affection, al-ʿAlāʾī expresses concern for his teacher on the Day of Judgment, fearing the consequences of his harsh tongue toward the many luminaries of Islam. Yet he remains hopeful that al-Dhahabī's honesty and lifelong service to the tradition will outweigh his errors, affirming that he himself would intercede on his behalf out of loyalty and gratitude.

== Reception ==
Taqī al-Dīn al-Subkī regarded al-ʿAlāʾī as the scholar most qualified to succeed him, while Zayn al-Dīn al-ʿIrāqī praised him as "the ḥāfiẓ of the East and the West." Al-Suyūṭī described him as a polymath, and al-Shawkānī observed that he excelled in every branch of the Islamic sciences. Al-Dhahabī, in al-Mukhtaṣar, portrayed him as a ḥāfiẓ highly skilled in identifying narrators and hidden defects in ḥadīth, lauding his sharp intellect, remarkable memory, and quick comprehension.

Al-Safadī said about him:

“He was a marvel in his vast learning and in his many virtues, the extent of which was well known among the people. He mastered exegesis (tafsir), and possessed the knowledge of ḥadīth that which the great multitude bore witness to. He excelled in both branches of jurisprudence and its foundations (furuʿ and uṣūl), encompassed what is found in the Muḥaṣṣal and Maḥṣūl [books of theology], extracted the very essence of grammatical expression, and penetrated the secrets of the Bedouin tongue. He had knowledge of the biographies of prominent figures of the world and knew the events involving the cunning and the peaceful. In the critical analysis and verification of authentic hadith, that was a discipline in which he possessed a unique mastery. The scholars of his time, both its foremost specialists and its wider learned community, bore witness to his excellence in it. His writings confirm these claims, his annotations establish his virtues, and they refute any faults attributed to him.”

Ibn Qāḍī Shuhba said:

“He strove diligently and exerted himself until he surpassed the people of his age in memorization and precision. He was an imām in jurisprudence, grammar, and the principles of law; well-versed in the sciences of hadith and the study of narrators, a master in the knowledge of texts and chains of transmission, one of the last of the great hadith scholars. His writings testify to his mastery in every field. He taught, issued fatwas, and engaged in scholarly debates. No one like him came after.”

Ibn al-Subkī said:

“He was a ḥāfiẓ (memorizer), steady, trustworthy, knowledgeable of the names of narrators, hidden defects (ʿilal), and hadith texts (matn). He was a jurist, theologian (mutakallim), man of letters, poet, both a composer of verse and prose, skilled in many sciences, an Ashʿarī, sound in creed, a Sunnī. After him, no one like him appeared in the science of hadith.”

Ibn Kathir said:

“He possessed exceptional mastery in identifying the higher and lower chains of transmission, and in compiling and verifying specialized ḥadīth collections and rare narrations. He also had strong proficiency in jurisprudence, linguistics (both grammar and lexicography), and literature.”

== Works ==
Imām al-ʿAlāʾī left behind a large collection of scholarly writings that had a great impact in enriching the Islamic library. Most of these works were in the sciences of ḥadīth, biographical evaluation, jurisprudence, its principles, Arabic sciences, theology, etc. He wrote around fifty works. The most notable among them are:

1. Al-Majmūʿ al-mudhhab fī qawā'id al-madhhab ("The Methodical Collection on the Principles of the Madhhab") — A work on Shāfiʿī jurisprudence; manuscripts are preserved in the Süleymaniye Library.
2. Tahdhīb al-uṣūl fī aḥādīth al-Rasūl ("The Refinement of the Foundations in the Hadiths of the Messenger") — An abridgment of Majd ad-Dīn Ibn Athīr's Jāmiʿ al-Uṣūl fī Aḥādīth al-Rasūl, a manuscript is in the Süleymaniye Library.
3. Al-Amālī al-arbaʿīn fī aʿmāl al-muttaqīn ("The Forty Dictations on the Deeds of the God-Fearing")
4. Al-Mawridu'l-rāwī fī'l-mawlid al-nabawī ("The Source for the Narrator Regarding the Prophetic Birth")
5. Al-ʿUdda ʿinda'l-karb wa'l-shidda ("The Provision in Times of Hardship and Distress")
6. Jāmiʿ al-Taḥṣīl li-Aḥkām al-Marāsīl (The Comprehensive Compilation on the Legal Rulings of Mursal Traditions) — Edited by Ḥamdī ʿAbd al-Majīd al-Salafī.
7. Taḥqīq al-murād fī anna'n-nahy yaqtaḍī al-fasād ("Verification of the Intent that Prohibition Necessitates Corruption") — A work on the principles of jurisprudence, published in Damascus (1975, 1982).
8. Bughyat al-Multamis fī Sabāʿiyyāt Ḥadīth al-Imām Mālik ibn Anas — ("The Seeker's Desire Concerning the Septenary Hadiths of Imām Mālik ibn Anas"), also edited by Ḥamdī ʿAbd al-Majīd al-Salafī (Beirut 1985).
9. Itmām al-Fawāʾid al-Mawṣūlah fī al-Adawāt al-Mawṣūlah ("The Completion of the Connected Benefits Regarding the Connected Particles")
10. Ijmāl al-Iṣābah fī Aqwāl al-Ṣaḥābah ("The Summary of “Al-Iṣābah” Concerning the Sayings of the Companions")
11. Al-Aḥkām al-Kubrā ("The Major Legal Rulings"), mentioned by the author of al-Anus, who said: "He compiled from it a precious section."
12. Burhān al-Taysīr fī ʿUnwān al-Tafsīr ("The Proof of Facilitation in the Title of Exegesis")
13. Kashf al-Niqāb ʿammā Rawā al-Shaykhān li-l-Aṣḥāb ("Unveiling the Veil Regarding What the Two Shaykhs (al-Bukhari and Muslim) narrated for the Companions")
14. Tuḥfat al-Qādim min Fawāʾid Abī al-Qāsim ("The Gift to the Visitor from the Benefits of Abū al-Qāsim")
15. Tafsīl al-Ijmāl fī Taʿāruḍ Baʿḍ al-Aqwāl wa al-Afʿāl ("Detailing the Generalities Regarding the Conflict Between Certain Sayings and Actions")
16. Tahdhīb al-Uṣūl ilā Mukhtaṣar Jāmiʿ al-Uṣūl ("The Refinement of the Principles Leading to the Abridgment of 'The Compendium of the Foundations'.")
17. Rafʿ al-Ishkāl ʿan Ḥadīth Ṣiyām Sittat Ayyām min Shawwāl ("Resolving the Difficulty Regarding the Hadith on Fasting Six Days of Shawwal")
18. Shifāʾ al-Mustarshidīn fī Ḥukm Ikhtilāf al-Mujtahidīn ("The Healing of the Seekers in the Ruling on the Disagreement of the Jurists")
19. Al-Naqd al-Ṣaḥīḥ limā Iʿturiḍa ʿalayhi min Aḥādīth al-Maṣābīḥ ("The Sound Critique of What Was Objected To Among the Hadiths of al-Maṣābīḥ") — this is the book presently under discussion.
20. Al-Washī al-Muʿallam fī Man Rawā ʿan Abīhi ʿan Jaddih ("The Embroidered Ornament Concerning Those Who Narrated from Their Fathers from Their Grandfathers")

== See also ==
- List of Ash'aris
