= Alanoud =

Alanoud, or Al Anoud (Arabic: العنود), is an Arabic name with multiple meanings including "strong-willed", "rain cloud" and "leader of deer"/"unhuntable deer".

== Notable people with the name ==
- Alanoud Alsharekh, Kuwaiti women's rights activist
- Al Anoud Al Fayez (born 1957), Saudi royal and former wife of King Abdullah of Saudi Arabia
- Alanoud bint Hamad Al Thani, Qatari royal and finance executive
- Alanoud Ihab, Iraqi-born Jordanian footballer
- Al-Anoud bint Mana Al Hajri (born 1990), Qatari royal and wife of Emir Tamim bin Hamad Al Thani
