= Arabic lexicology and lexicography =

Arabic lexicology and lexicography is that field in Arabic language studies which examines Arabic lexicon, Arabic word-formation, the evolution of vocabulary and the composition of Arabic dictionaries.

As worded by John A. Haywood,

In the compilation of dictionaries and other lexicographical works, the Arabs—or rather, those who wrote Arabic—were second to none until the Renaissance, with the possible exception of the Chinese. A dozen or more major dictionaries besides many vocabularies both general and specialised, bear witness to their pre-eminence in this field at a time when such works were almost unknown in Western Europe. Only recently have the Arabs themselves recognized the outstanding merit of their lexicographical heritage […].

In the words of Tilman Seindensticker, "within Classical Arabic literature, lexicographical writings form an extensive and multifaceted branch, having produced remarkable results in the period from the late 2nd/8th century to the 12th/18th century and flourishing particularly in the 4th/10th century".

Different systems of arrangement have been used historically. Quoting Haywoods,

At first, vocabularies of limited scope and uncertain arrangement were written. Then full dictionaries were written on an anagrammatic basis, according to an artificial alphabetical order based on phonetic principles, and separating roots according to the number of letters which they comprised. Later, roots were listed in rhyme order; that is, according to their final consonants. The present system—the alphabetical order of the initial—was tried by a few authors, usually with variations great or small, but it never gained wide currency.

In discussing "the contribution of the Muḥīṭ al-Muḥīṭ dictionary written by Buṭrus al-Bustānī, one of the leading figures of the Nahḍa, to the development of modern Arabic lexicography", Fruma Zachs and Yehudit Dror have written:

Muḥīṭ al-Muḥīṭ constituted an important pedagogical step in transforming classical Arabic into “a living” language adapted to the needs of the Arab nation. However, although Muḥīṭ al-Muḥīṭ took the first crucial steps toward creating a modern Arabic lexical source, this dictionary mainly extends the age-old Arabic tradition of lexicography. It nevertheless paved the way to al-Bustānī’s final work, the encyclopedia Dāʾirat al-maʿārif, his most monumental effort and the cornerstone of al-Bustānī’s modern lexical vision.

== See also ==
- List of Arabic dictionaries
- English lexicology and lexicography

== Sources ==
- Haywood, John A. (1960). Arabic Lexicography: Its History, and its Place in the General History of Lexicography. Leiden: E. J. Brill.
- Seidensticker, Tilman (2007). "Lexicography: Classical Arabic". Encyclopedia of Arabic Language and Linguistics (PDF).
- Zachs, Fruma; Dror, Yehudit (2020). "The Muḥīṭ al-Muḥīṭ Dictionary: The Transition from Classical to Modern Arabic Lexicography" (PDF). Journal of Arabic and Islamic Studies. doi:10.5617/jais.7853.
