= Jamal al-Din al-Mizzi =

Syrian Islamic Scholar (1256–1341 CE)

Jamāl al-Dīn Abū al-Ḥajjāj Yūsuf ibn al-Zakī ʻAbd al-Raḥmān ibn Yūsuf al-Kalbī al-Quḍā'ī al-Mizzī

Personal life
- Born: 1256 AD (654 AH) al-Mizza, now Syria
- Died: 1341 AD (742 AH) Damascus, now Syria
- Era: Mamluk Era
- Region: Syrian scholar
- Main interest: Ilm ar-Rijal
- Other names: Al-Ḥāfiẓ, Yūsuf ibn al-Zakī ʻAbd al-Raḥmān al-Mizzī

Religious life
- Religion: Islam
- Denomination: Sunni
- Jurisprudence: Shafi'i
- Creed: Athari

Muslim leader
- Influenced by: Al-Shafi'i, Ahmad ibn Hanbal, Al-Dimyati, Ibn Taymiyya
- Influenced: Al-Dhahabī, Ṣalāḥ al-Dīn al-ʿAlā'ī, Ibn Kathīr, Tāj al-Dīn al-Subkī

Jamāl al-Dīn Abū al-Ḥajjāj Yūsuf ibn al-Zakī ʻAbd al-Raḥmān ibn Yūsuf ibn ʻAbd al-Malik ibn Yūsuf al-Kalbī al-Quḍā'ī al-Mizzī, (Arabic: يوسف بن عبد الرحمن المزي), also called Al-Ḥāfiẓ Abī al-Ḥajjāj, was a Syrian muhaddith and the foremost `Ilm al-rijāl Islamic scholar.

== Life ==
Al-Mizzī was born near Aleppo in 1256 under the reign of the last Ayyubid emir An-Nasir Yusuf. From 1260, the region was ruled by the na'ib al-saltana (viceroys) of the Mamluk Sultanate. In childhood, he moved with his family to the village of al-Mizza outside Damascus, where he was educated in Qur'ān and fiqh. In his twenties he began his studies to become a muḥaddith and learned from the masters. His fellow pupil and life-long friend was Taqī al-Dīn ibn Taymiyya. It was also Ibn Taymiyya's ideological influence, which, although contrary to his own Shāfi'ī legalist inclination, that led to a stint in jail.

Despite his affiliation with Ibn Taymiyya, he became head of the Dār al-Ḥadīth al-Ashrafiyya, a leading ḥadīth academy in Damascus, in 1319. And although he professed the Ash'arī doctrine, suspicion continued about his true beliefs. He travelled across the Mamluk Sultanate of Egypt, Syria (الشَّام), and Ḥijāz and became the greatest `Ilm al-rijāl (عِلْمُ الرِّجال) scholar of the Muslim world and an expert grammarian and philologist of Arabic. He died at Dar al-Hadith al-Ashrafiyya in Damascus in 1341/2 and was buried in the Sufiyya graveyard.

== Pupils ==
His students include the following:

- Al-Dhahabī
- Ṣalāḥ al-Dīn al-ʿAlā'ī
- Ibn Kathīr
- Tāj al-Dīn al-Subkī
- Ibn al-Furat
- Najm ad-Din al-Tufi

== Works ==
- Tahdhīb al-Kamāl fī Asmā' al-Rijāl; biographical lexicon and comprehensive reworking of Al-Kamal fi Asma' al-Rijal, a collection of narrator biographies of the transmitters of isnāds in the Six major Hadith collections and others, based upon the tarf (beginning segment) of the hadith. The Tahdhīb includes Ruwāt kuttub al-sitta. Al-Asqalānī and others wrote compendia of this work.
- Tuḥfat al-Ashraf bi-Ma'rifat al-Aṭraf; alphabetically indexed encyclopaedia of the musnads of the first generation transmitters, the companions of Muhammad. An indispensable resource for the study of Muslim tradition that comprises al-Nasā'ī's Al-Sunan al-kubrā.

== Bibliography ==
- Brockelmann, Carl (1902). "II". Geschichte der arabischen Litteratur. Vol. II. Berlin: E Felber. p. 64 f. ISBN 9789004104075.
- Dhahabī (al-), Muḥammad ibn Aḥmad (2002). Kawtharī, Muḥammad Zāhid ibn al-Ḥasan; Ḥāmid, Abū Bakr ʻAbd al-Karīm; Ṭahṭāwī, Aḥmad Rāfiʻ (eds.). Tadhkirāt al-ḥuffāẓ (in Arabic). Bayrūt Lubnān: Dār Iḥyāʼ al-Turāth al-ʻArabī. pp. 1498 ff.
- Subkī, Tāj al-Dīn ʻAbd al-Wahhāb ibn ʻAlī (1964). Ṭanāḥī, Maḥmūd Muḥammad; Ḥulw, ʻAbd al-Fattāḥ Muḥammad (eds.). al-Shāfī'iyya al-kubrā (in Arabic). Vol. X. Cairo: ʻĪsá al-Bābī al-Ḥalabī. pp. 395–430. OCLC 23510000.
- Asqalānī (al-), Ibn Ḥajar (1992). Darwīsh, ʻAdnān (ed.). Dhayl Al-Durar al-Kamīna. Vol. v. Al-Qāhirah: al-Munaẓẓamah al-ʻArabīyah lil-Tarbiyah wa-al-Thaqāfah wa-al-ʻUlūm, Maʻhad al-Makhṭuṭat al-ʻArabīyah. pp. 233–7. OCLC 27210371.
- Ḥanbalī (al-), Ibn al-'Imād (1933) [1931]. Shadharāt al-dhahab. Vol. vi. Al-Qāhirah: Maktabat al-Qudsī. p. 136 f. OCLC 22865694.
- Mizzī (al-), Yūsuf ibn al-Zakī ʻAbd al-Raḥmān (1992) [1980]. Ma'rūf, Bashshār 'Awwād (ed.). Mizzī Tahdhīb al-kamāl fī asmā' al-rijāl. Beirut: Muʼassasat al-Risālah. OCLC 12422024.
- Juynboll, Gautier H. A. (1990), "Al-Mizzī", Encyclopedia of Islam, Leiden: E. J. Brill, pp. 212–3
