= Muhit al-Muhit =

Muhit al-Muhit (Arabic: محيط المحيط / ALA-LC: Muḥīṭ al-Muḥīṭ) is an early modern Arabic dictionary written by the Lebanese writer and scholar Butrus al-Bustani (1819–1883), one of the leading figures of the Nahda.

Bustani's vision was to revive and modernize the Arabic language. Mindful of the importance of pedagogy, he created the dictionary to make it easier for teachers and students to attain language proficiency.

The work was also strongly motivated by the writer's Syrian nationalist ideology, leveraging language as a unifying factor for the peoples of the Levant.

Bustani finished the first version of the dictionary in 1869, eleven years after he had begun.

Muhit al-Muhit is considered by modern lexicographers as a seminal step in the transition from classical to modern Arabic. Bustani introduced new lexical items in Muhit al-Muhit, expanded the meaning of others, and added brief modern examples of word uses. He also removed or reduced features typical to classical Arabic lexicography such as using Quranic and poetic verses as references to lexicographical use.

The first is the omission or reduction of typical features characterizing classical Arabic lexicography, such as citing Qurʾānic verses and poetic verses as examples. The second involves incorporating briefly imodern meanings.

He accomplished this by extending their meaning via historical, psychological, sociological, scientific and religious explanations. This lexical achievement is likely to have required a preparatory stage. We suggest that the project of Muhit al-Muhit was one such stage assisting in the transformation from classical to modern Arabic. A close examination of this dictionary suggests that it remains a classical dictionary that imitates classical dictionaries such as Lisan al-Arab with two fundamental differences. The first is the omission or reduction of typical features characterizing classical Arabic lexicography, such as citing Qurʾānic verses and poetic verses as examples. The second involves incorporating briefly modern meanings.

== Bibliography ==
- Zachs, Fruma; Dror, Yehudit (2020). "The Muḥīṭ al-Muḥīṭ Dictionary: The Transition from Classical to Modern Arabic Lexicography". Journal of Arabic and Islamic Studies. 20: 15–32. doi:10.5617/jais.7853. S2CID 225979755. This article incorporates text from this source, which is available under the CC BY 4.0 license.
