= Taj al-'Arus min Jawahir al-Qamus =

18th-century Arabic dictionary

Taj al-'Arus min Jawahir al-Qamus (Arabic: تاج العروس من جواهر القاموس, romanized: Tāj al-ʿArūs min Jawāhir al-Qāmūs, short title Taj al-'Arus; "The Bride's Crown from the Pearls of al-Qāmūs") is an Arabic language dictionary written by the Egyptian scholar Murtada al-Zabidi (1732–1790), one of the foremost philologists of the Arab post-classical era. The monumental dictionary contains around 120,000 entries, each entry containing dozen of words, and is an expansion of Fairuzabadi's earlier Qamus al-Muhit and Ibn Manzur's Lisan al-Arab. It is considered the largest Arabic dictionary ever written in history.

Begun in 1760, when al-Zabidi was 29 years old, the dictionary took him fourteen years to complete; he concluded it on the eighth of September 1774. The dictionary's introduction included a lengthy commentary on the dictionary of Fairuzabadi.

Zabidi's chose a feminine subject in the title of his dictionary in commemoration of his deceased wife; he made use of antecedents, particularly Fairuzabadi's Qamus and Ibn Manzur's Lisan al-Arab, and undertook multiple travels and meetings to validate his work. He expanded previous word definitions, added new entries, and corrected errors found in previous lexicographic works.

Zabidi's extensive bibliography numbered 115 consulted sources, including ones on Hadith and history. He also gave credit to previously unnamed authors.
