= Fahad Al-Sharekh =

Kuwaiti venture capitalist and business executive

- فهد الشارخ
- Born: Kuwait
- Education: Northeastern University
- Occupations: Venture capitalist, Business executive
- Years active: 1996–present
- Known for: Sakhr Software Company

Fahad Al - Sharekh is a Kuwaiti venture capitalist and technology based business executive who is the General Partner at JEDI Fund, a US Silicon Valley focused, early stage venture capital fund launched in July 2021.

He served on several boards including ATG, Saftec and AwalNet. Currently Director of the Board at CODED, the First Coding Academy in the GCC.

He has received several awards, including Family Business Awards 2021 from the Family Business Council. AlSharekh also served as the Business Development Director of Al Alamiah Group, a professional IT firm in Kuwait, and is the founder and CEO of Ajeeb.com.

== Early life and education ==
AlSharekh was born in Kuwait and is the eldest son of Kuwaiti businessman Mohammed AlSharekh. He attended Northeastern University in Boston, Massachusetts. As part of his academic program, he trained in Investment Banking with various organizations including Wall Street's Brown Brothers Harriman & Co. He also completed the Executive Program in Corporate Strategy at the MIT Sloan School of Management, Cambridge, Massachusetts. His high school education was completed at Northfield Mount Hermon School in Northfield, Massachusetts.

== Career ==
Before that he founded TechInvest in 2015 to provide an opportunity for Gulf Cooperation Council (GCC) investors to obtain exposure to private investment opportunities in the technology sector. Techinvest advised and structured several deals in early, growth and late stage VC totaling over $700m in money allocated. Techinvest has also supported and helped launch several VC Emerging Managers, and has equity in several of those VC management companies, "GP stake".

Over 23 years experience in operations and global business development in Tech. As both an executive and a board director, AlSharekh executed strategies for startups, partnerships, and private and public offerings of holdings. Worked in 2005 as the chief executive officer of Sakhr Software Company, Arabic language and speech technologies company. Under AlSharekh, Sakhr received 3 USPTO patents for Sakhr’s proprietary technologies. Worked on founding Saudi's 1st ISP AWalNet in 2003 which was acquired by STC in 2006. Supervised the transformation of a 30 year old family IT business company and publicly listing ATG in 2006.

Since 2019 AlSharekh is the vice chairman of Kamco Invest – KSA since 2019. He also serves as the general manager of Sharq Capital since 2011, a private holding company that operates through MENA and the US. Previously a Board Member and subsequently Chairman of Al Mal Investment Company. A publicly traded Kuwaiti asset management company that was established in 1980. Worked as a consultant for the Kuwait Direct Investment Promotion Authority (KPIDA).

AlSharekh worked on the advisory board of AIM Startup, an initiative of the UAE Ministry of Economy to connect promising startups with investors and business partners from other parts of the world— set in the heart of the UAE’s Annual Investment Meeting, the World’s Leading FDI Platform for Emerging Markets.

== Personal life ==
AlSharekh is the eldest son of Kuwaiti businessman Mohammed AlSharekh, who started Sakhr Software Company in 1982. He joined his father's company right after completing his higher education.

== Publishing ==
- Fahad AlSharekh discusses the MENA VC & Startup Ecosystem -2020.
- The Business Year interview -2020.
- The Business Year interview -2019.

== Recognition ==
With AlSharekh the CEO of the company, Sakhr software has won the following international awards:

- Family Business Awards 2021 - Family Business Council - Gulf (2021)
- eContent Award - Arabic Language Buddy for smart phones (2010)
- Oman Portal - Arab Web Awards (2010)
