= Lexicon of the Modern Arabic Language =

Book by Ahmed Mukhtar Omar

Dictionary of the Contemporary Arabic Language معجم اللغة العربية المعاصرة
- Author: Ahmed Mukhtar Omar (1933–2003)
- Original title: معجم اللغة العربية المعاصرة
- Language: Arabic
- Genre: Dictionary
- Published: 2008
- Publisher: Alam Al-Kutub
- Publication place: Egypt
- Pages: 3,367
- ISBN: 977-232-626-4

Dictionary of the Contemporary Arabic Language (Arabic: معجم اللغة العربية المعاصرة mu‘jam al-lughah al-‘arabīyah al-mu‘āṣirah) is a 2008 dictionary aiming to cover modern Arabic. It was authored by Ahmed Mukhtar Omar.
