= Sakhr Software Company =

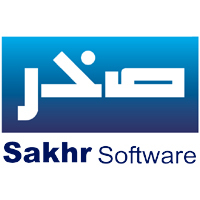
- Founded: 1982
- Founder: Mohammed Al-Sharekh
- Headquarters: Kuwait City
- Website: www.sakhr.com

Sakhr Software Company (Arabic: صخر) is an Arabic language technology company based in Kuwait. It deals with products for the Middle East in e-governance, education, wireless, and security. Sakhr was founded in 1982 by Mohammed Al-Sharekh.

The company currently has 200 employees worldwide. Its research and engineering activities are in Silicon Valley and Egypt, with sales offices in the United States (Washington, DC and California), Kuwait, UAE (Dubai and Abu Dhabi), Oman, Egypt and Saudi Arabia.

== History ==
Sakhr was founded in 1982 by Mohammed Al-Sharekh.

In 1990, following the first events of the Gulf War, Sakhr relocated to Heliopolis, Cairo. After the relocation, the company changed its approach by terminating all computer manufacturing projects to focus exclusively on developing software products.

Sakhr provided Arabic language localization services to the Saudi's Ministry of Education, Egypt's Ministry of Commerce, Oman's Ministry of Education, and the Dubai Chamber of Commerce and Industry.

In December 2024, Katara Studios has announced a biopic titled "Sakhr," focusing on the late Kuwaiti entrepreneur Mohamed Al-Sharekh, who pioneered the first Arabic-language operating system in the 1980s. The film aims to celebrate Al-Sharekh's significant contributions to Arabic computing and technology, highlighting his legacy in a region where most software was originally designed for English speakers.

== Dial Directions ==
In 2009, Sakhr acquired Dial Directions, Inc., a United States Silicon Valley software company providing language applications for mobile cloud-computing environments, including wireless carriers, telematics, and smartphones such as the Apple iPhone to enhance its market position in the emerging mobile application & cloud computing market.

== See also ==
- Sakhr Computers
- Arabic machine translation
