= Jibran Masud =

Lebanese writer and scholar

- Born: Ghibrial Masud; 1930 (age 95–96); Beirut, Lebanon
- Education: Bachelor of Science degree in Arabic Language and Literature and History; Master's degree in Arabic Literature
- Alma mater: American University of Beirut
- Occupations: Writer, researcher, scholar, professor, lecturer, manager
- Writing career
- Language: Arabic, English, French
- Genres: Story, novel, literary studies, linguistic studies
- Notable awards: Friends of the Book award for "Al-Ra’id" extensive, linguistic lexicon, Lebanon (1965); National Order of the Cedar medallion, Lebanon (1970)

Jibran Masud (Arabic: جبران مسعود; born as Ghibrial Masud, 1930) is a Lebanese writer, scholar and researcher.

== Education ==
In 1950, Masud graduated from American University of Beirut with a Bachelor of Science degree in Arabic Language and Literature and History with honors, and a Master's degree in Arabic literature, three years later.

== Career ==
His Arabic lexicon Al-Ra’id was published in 1992, In 2016 he published The Encyclopedia of Arabic Literature: its Eras, Arts and Most Renowned Figures, in eight volumes. Masud compiled artistic characteristics of Arabic literature and its best known figures from the pre-Islamic period to the Abbasid era, and the Andalusian era. The encyclopedia also covers poetry movements including Sufi and chivalric poetry. A section of the encyclopedia covered literary criticism.

Masud founded the House of Wisdom publishing house (romanized: Bayt Al-Hikmah). He has published articles and researches in the fields of literature, linguistics and history, in Lebanese newspapers.

== Works ==
His major works include:

- “Red Ashes” (original title: Al-Ramad Al-Ahmar), Lebanon, 1948.
- "Al-Ra’id" extensive, linguistic lexicon (original title: Al-Ra’id Mu’jam Lughawi w-‘Asri), Dar El-Ilm Lilmalayin, Beirut, Lebanon, 1992.
- "The Standard Arabic: An Endless Flame” (original title: Al-‘Arabiya Al-Fus-ha Shu’la La Tantafi’), House of Wisdom, Beirut, Lebanon, 2001.
- "My Grandmother" (original title: Jidaty), Hachette Antoine, Beirut, Lebanon, 2010.
- "Angry Groans" (original title: Anin Al-Ghadab), Naufal Publishers, Beirut, Lebanon, 2012.
- "The Encyclopedia of Arabic Literature: its Eras, Arts and Most Renowned Figures" (original title: Mawsoo’at Al-Adab Al-‘Arabi: Fununoh wa-Usuroh wa-Ash-har A’lamuh), House of Wisdom, Beirut, Lebanon, 2016.

== Awards ==
- Nominated for the Friends of the Book award for composing "Al-Ra’id" extensive, linguistic lexicon, in Lebanon, 1965.
- Awarded the National Order of the Cedar medallion, 1970.

== Positions ==
- Arabic literature, Islamic philosophy, History and Geography professor, International College, Beirut, Lebanon.
- Manager of the Arabic courses in the French department, International College, Beirut, Lebanon.
