= Majd ad-Dīn Ibn Athir =

12th century Hadith scholar and lexicographer

Imam Majd ad-Dīn Ibn Athir
- إمجد الدين ابن الأثير
- Title: Majd ad-Dīn; Al-Ḥāfiẓ

Personal life
- Born: 1149 Jazīrat Ibn ʿUmar
- Died: 1210 (aged 60–61) Mosul
- Era: Islamic Golden Age
- Region: Iraq
- Main interest(s): Hadith, Islamic jurisprudence, Lexicography, Philology
- Notable work(s): Jami' al-Usul fi Ahadith al-Rasul; Al-Nihaya fi al-Gharib al-Hadith
- Occupation: Scholar, Emir of Mosul, Traditionist, Jurist, Lexicographer, Philologist

Religious life
- Religion: Islam
- Denomination: Sunni
- Jurisprudence: Shafi'i
- Creed: Ash'ari

Muslim leader
- Influenced by: Al-Shafi'i Abu Hasan al-Ash'ari
- Influenced: Ibn Manzur

Abū l-Saʿādāt al-Mubārak b. Muḥammad (al-Athīr) b. Muḥammad b. ʿAbd al-Karīm b. ʿAbd al-Wāḥid al-Shaybānī al-Jazarī al-Mawṣilī (Arabic: أبو السعادة المبارك بن محمد (الأثير) بن محمد بن عبد الكريم بن عبد الواحد الشيباني الجزري الموصلّي), commonly known as Majd ad-Dīn Ibn Athir (Arabic: مجد الدين ابن الأثير) was a prominent traditionist, lexicographer, philologist, and a jurist of the Shafi'i school. He is regarded as one of the leading hadith scholars of the seventh century A.H.

== Family ==
Majd ad-Dīn was one of three brothers from a wealthy family of scholars, all known as Ibn al-Athīr of Jazirat Ibn ‘Umar and Mosul. The other two being Ali ibn al-Athir and Diyā' ad-Dīn, who was also an historian. The father Muḥammad b. ‘Abd al-Karim was an official of the Zangid government. The Ibn al-Athīr family were Arab, or Kurdish, of the Shayban lineage of the large and influential Arab tribe Banu Bakr, who lived across upper Mesopotamia, and gave their name to the city of Diyar Bakr.

== Early life ==
Majd al-Dīn Ibn al-Athīr al-Jazarī was born in 544 A.H. / 1149 C.E. in Jazīrat Ibn ʿUmar, where he also received his initial education. During his early years, he studied Qurʾānic exegesis (tafsīr), hadith, Arabic grammar, and Islamic jurisprudence (fiqh) under local scholars. In 565 A.H., he moved to Mosul, where he deepened his expertise in fiqh and hadith, producing a number of valuable works.

== Education ==
Ibn al-Athīr devoted much of his scholarly life to philology and religious sciences, studying under several distinguished teachers of his time. He learned Arabic grammar from noted linguists such as Najm al-Dīn Abū Muḥammad Saʿīd ibn al-Daḥḥān of Baghdad, Abū Bakr Muḥammad ibn Saʿdūn al-Maghribī al-Qurṭubī, Abū’l-Ḥazm Makkī ibn al-Rayyan, and Ibn Shubbah al-Makkī al-Naḥwī.

Although he studied language extensively, Ibn al-Athīr's main focus remained religious learning, particularly in hadith. He initially participated in scholarly gatherings of hadith experts in his hometown, listening to and transmitting traditions from them. Later, after relocating to Mosul, he continued his hadith studies by attending the scholarly assemblies of the city's prominent hadith authorities.

Among the prominent hadith scholars of Mosul from whom Ibn al-Athīr received and transmitted prophetic traditions were Abū’l-Faḍl ibn al-Ṭūsī, the khaṭīb (preacher) of Mosul, and Yaḥyā ibn Saʿdūn al-Qurṭubī. After studying and collecting hadith from the scholars of his hometown, he travelled to Baghdad to further his education. There, he attended the sessions of renowned hadith masters such as Abū’l-Qāsim Ṣāḥib ibn al-Khall, Ibn Kulayb, and ʿAbd al-Wahhāb ibn Sukayna, from whom he also received narrations.

== Scholarly life ==
Following his period of study in Baghdad, Ibn al-Athīr returned to Mosul, where he devoted himself to teaching, transmitting, and dictating hadith to his own students. Ibn al-Athīr not only taught and dictated hadith directly to his students but also employed the ijāza system — the method of granting formal authorization to transmit specific traditions. It is recorded that Fakhr al-Dīn ibn al-Najjārī narrated hadith on the authority of Ibn al-Athīr after receiving such an ijāza from him.

Before settling in Mosul, Majd al-Dīn Ibn al-Athīr had already served in several prominent administrative roles in his native city, Jazīrat Ibn ʿUmar. Among these positions, he was appointed Chief of the Court of Justice, and later placed in charge of the Treasury by Sayf al-Dīn al-Ghāzī ibn Mawdūd ibn Zangī.

Throughout his life, Majd al-Dīn enjoyed great respect from state officials, who continued to seek his counsel and administrative advice even after his retirement. His career began modestly as a scribe, composing official correspondence for local princes. His skill in writing and administration soon earned him the position of Chief Secretary in the court of Amīr Qaymaz ibn al-Khādim al-Zaynī, where he was responsible for drafting letters addressed to rulers across various realms.

This role, regarded as one of the highest offices in government, inevitably attracted envy and resentment among other courtiers. As a result, false accusations were brought against him, leading to his imprisonment. However, once his innocence was established, he was released and reinstated to his former position. He continued to serve faithfully until the death of ʿIzz al-Dīn Masʿūd, after which he resigned from public office.

Although Ibn al-Athīr spent the early part of his career in court service, he gradually withdrew from public life in his later years. By temperament, he was disinclined to hold official positions, preferring a life devoted to scholarship. After the death of ʿIzz al-Dīn ibn Masʿūd, his successor Arslān Shāh invited Ibn al-Athīr to resume his former office. Initially, Arslān Shāh sent his vizier Luʾluʾ to offer him the post of minister, but when Ibn al-Athīr declined, the ruler personally visited him to persuade him to accept the appointment. Despite this royal insistence, Ibn al-Athīr courteously refused, explaining that he could not undertake such responsibilities.

In his old age, Ibn al-Athīr suffered from a chronic illness that caused paralysis of his hands and feet, leaving him unable to write or walk. Confined to his home, he employed scribes to assist him in composing his works. During this period, his residence became a gathering place for scholars and intellectuals, where discussions of literature and religious sciences were frequent. His dedication to learning and scholarship remained steadfast; even in his infirmity, he preferred the quiet life of a devoted scholar over the prestige of governmental office.

An interesting anecdote about his illness further illustrates his deep devotion to knowledge, it is said that he even refused a potential cure, content to continue his scholarly pursuits despite his suffering. Ibn al-Athīr also established a ribat (spiritual retreat) in a village near Mosul, known as Qaṣr al-Ḥarb, which became a center for Sufis and distinguished visitors of his time. He endowed this ribat, along with his own home in Mosul, as charitable foundations (awqāf).

== Death ==
Majd al-Dīn Ibn al-Athīr died in 606 A.H. / 1209 C.E. at the age of sixty-two in Mosul, where he was buried in the Ribat of Darb al-Durj.

== Works ==
Majd al-Dīn Ibn al-Athīr distinguished himself in several branches of Islamic learning, including fiqh (jurisprudence), hadith (Prophetic traditions), biography, Arabic grammar (nahwi) and Arabic linguistics (lughwi). His scholarly legacy includes numerous significant works, among them the following:

1. Jāmiʿ al-Uṣūl fī Aḥādīth al-Rasūl – Considered his magnum opus, this monumental compilation of hadith spans thirteen large volumes, gathering traditions from the major canonical collections.
2. Al-Nihāya fī Gharīb al-Ḥadīth – A celebrated lexical work, arranged alphabetically, explaining rare and difficult words found in hadith literature.
3. Al-Banīn wa’l-Banāt min Rijāl al-Aḥādīth – As the title suggests, this work focuses on the biographies and character assessments of hadith transmitters.
4. Kitāb al-Inṣāf fī’l-Jamʿ bayna al-Kashf wa’l-Kashshāf – An exegetical treatise that reconciles the interpretations of al-Thaʿlabī and al-Zamakhsharī in their respective Qurʾānic commentaries.
5. Kitāb al-Shāfiʿ fī Sharḥ Musnad al-Imām al-Shāfiʿī – A commentary on the Musnad of Imām al-Shāfiʿī, elucidating obscure expressions and explaining related legal rulings (ahkam).
6. Kitāb al-Muṣṭafā wa’l-Mukhtār fī al-Adʿiya wa’l-Adhkār – A devotional manual containing prayers and supplications.
7. Kitāb al-Mukhtār fī Manāqib al-Akhyār' – A work dedicated to the virtues and noble qualities of distinguished figures.
8. Al-Bāhir fī al-Furūq – A grammatical treatise analyzing subtle distinctions and linguistic variations in Arabic usage.
9. Kitāb al-Ābāʾ wa’l-Ummuhāt wa’l-Banīn wa’l-Banāt wa’l-Aḍhwāʾ wa’l-Ḍhawāt – A comprehensive biographical and genealogical work, which Yāqūt and other scholars identify as also being known under the title Kitāb al-Murassaʿ.
10. Tahdhīb Fuṣūl Ibn al-Daḥḥān – A philological study refining the linguistic analyses of Ibn al-Daḥḥān.
11. Kitāb al-Badīʿ fī Sharḥ al-Fuṣūl – Another philological work, remarkable for its innovative structure and distinctive arrangement of chapters.
12. Sharḥ Gharīb al-Tiwāl – A lexical commentary explaining uncommon words and expressions.
13. Dīwān al-Rasāʾil – An anthology of letters, reflecting his literary style and administrative eloquence.
14. Kitāb fī Ṣināʿat al-Kitābah – A treatise on the art of writing and correspondence, emphasizing rhetorical and stylistic excellence.
15. A short epistle on mathematics

== See also ==
- List of Ash'aris

== Bibliography ==
- Imtiaz Ahmad (1984). "IBN AL-ATHIR AL-MUḤADDITH — LIFE AND WORKS". Islamic Studies. 23 (1). Islamic Research Institute: 33–43. JSTOR 20847253.
