= Abu Mansur al-Azhari =

Arab lexicographer, philologist and grammarian

- أبومنصور الأزهري
- Born: c. 895; Herat
- Died: c. 980; Herat
- Occupation: Lexicographer

Academic background
- Influences: Ibn al-Sari al-Zajjaj, Ibn Duraid, Ibn al-Anbari

Academic work
- Era: Abbāsid
- Main interests: philology, linguistics, grammar, lexicography
- Notable works: Tahdhib al-Lughat (تهذيب اللغات); ‘The Concise Guide of Languages’

Abū Manṣūr Muḥammad ibn Aḥmad al-Azharī (Arabic: أبومنصور محمد بن أحمد الأزهري; 282–370 AH/895–980 AD) or simply known as Abu Mansur al-Azhari (أبومنصور الأزهري), was a lexicographer, philologist and grammarian of Arabic. a prominent philologist of his time, known for his talents and the transmitting of philological knowledge. His most important work is Tahdhib al-Lughat (تهذيب اللغات; The Concise Guide of Languages).

== Biography ==
Al-Azhari was born in the city of Herat in Khorasan, at the time controlled by the Samanid dynasty. He is known as al-Azhari after an ancestor whose name is Azhar and nothing is known about him. In his youth, al-Azhari travelled to the city of Baghdad, which was considered a center of science, the city was still under the Abbasid rule. Studying in Baghdad, he met the famous contemporary grammarian of the Abbasid court Ibn al-Sari al-Zajjaj (d. 923). According to Ibn Khallikan, Al-Azhari also met another leading grammarian of the time, Ibn Duraid. As a lexicographer, he was one of the first to recognize the probable Syriac origin of words like zakāt and ṣalāt.

In his travels to acquire knowledge of the Arabic language, he left Baghdad to go to Mecca. Around this time, the Qarmatians were causing havoc in Arabia after revolting against the Abbasids. In 924 AD, as al-Azhari was returning from Mecca to Baghdad accompanied by a caravan of pilgrims on their way back from Hajj, they were attacked by the Qarmatians led by Abu Tahir al-Jannabi. Many of the pilgrims were slaughtered and their belongings stolen. Al-Azhari however was taken as a prisoner, living his next two years in captivity. While he lived among the Bedouin Qarmatians, he recorded in his book Tahdhib al-Lughat their way of living and learned their idioms and expressions. Al-Azhari died in his native city of Herat in the year 980 AD.

== Works ==
- Tahdhib al-Lughat (The Concise Guide of Languages)
- Gharib al-Alfaz (Rare Words)
- Kitab al-Tafsir (Book of Interpretation)

== See also ==
- List of pre-modern Arab scientists and scholars
