= Lisan al-Arab =

1290 dictionary of Arabic by Ibn Manzur

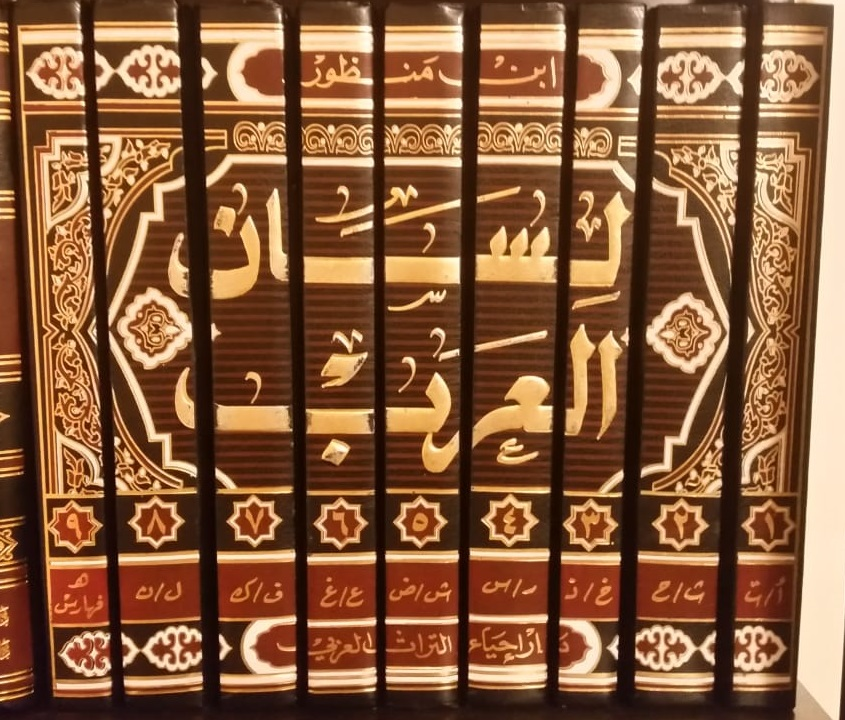
- Author: Ibn Manzur
- Original title: لسان العرب
- Language: Arabic
- Genre: Dictionary

Lisān al-ʿArab (Arabic: لسان العرب, lit. 'The Tongue of the Arabs') is a dictionary of Arabic completed by Ibn Manzur in 1290.

== History ==
Ibn Manzur's objective in this project was to reindex and reproduce the contents of previous works to facilitate readers' use of and access to them. In his introduction to the book, he writes:

In this book there is nothing unprecedented, nor is there a particular methodology I hold other than that I gathered what had been dispersed in those academic books... I did not include any other text, so let anyone who cites my book understand that he is citing these five original sources.

Occupying 20 printed book volumes (in the most frequently cited edition), it was the best known dictionary of the Arabic language for hundreds of years, as well as one of the most comprehensive. Ibn Manzur compiled it from other sources to a large degree. The most important sources for it were the Tahdhīb al-Lugha of Azharī, Al-Muḥkam of Ibn Sidah, Al-Nihāya of Ibn Athīr and Jauhari's Ṣiḥāḥ, as well as the ḥawāshī (glosses) of the latter (Kitāb at-Tanbīh wa-l-Īḍāḥ) by Ibn Barrī. It follows the Ṣiḥāḥ in the arrangement of the roots: the headwords are not arranged by the alphabetical order of the radicals as is usually done today in the study of Semitic languages, but according to the last radical - which makes finding rhyming endings significantly easier. Furthermore, the Lisān al-Arab notes its direct sources, but not or seldom their sources, making it hard to trace the linguistic history of certain words. Murtaḍá al-Zabīdī corrected this in his Tāj al-ʿArūs, that itself goes back to the Lisān. The Lisān, according to Ignatius d'Ohsson, was already printed in the 18th century in Istanbul, thus fairly early for the Islamic world.

== Published editions ==
- Bullag Misr al-Matb'ah al-Kubra al-'Amiriyah Egypt; 1883, vol.,1
- Al-Maṭbaʿa al-Kubra al-Amirīya, Bulaq; 1883 - 1890, vols.,20
- Dar Sader, Beirut; 1955 - 1956, vols.,15.
- Ādāb al-Ḥawza, Iran; 1984, vols.,18
