= Al-Qāmūs al-Muḥīṭ =

Arabic dictionary

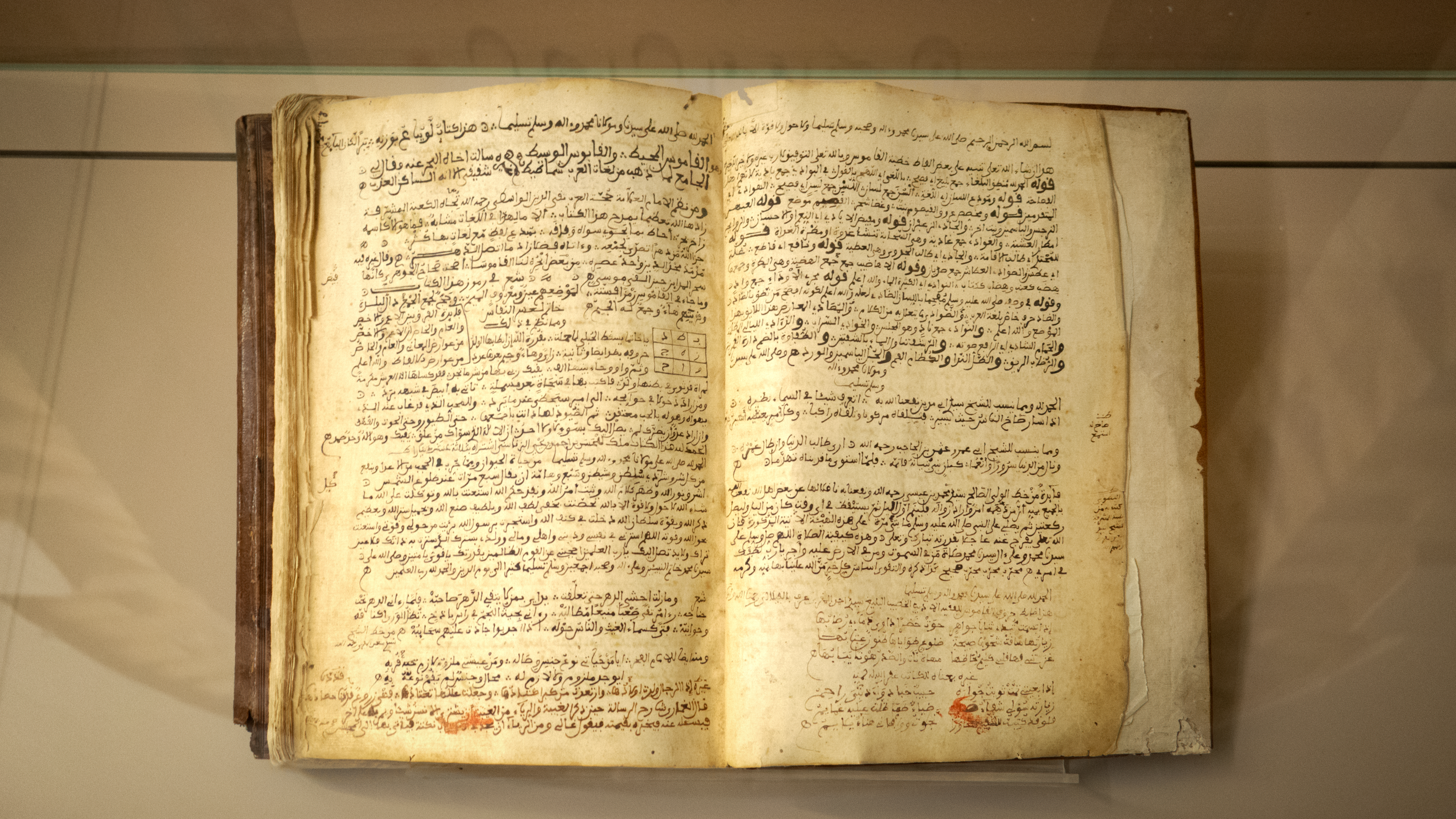
- Manuscript of the book displayed in the Islamic Calligraphy Museum of Tlemcen.
- Author: Firuzabadi
- Original title: القاموس المحيط، والقابوس الوسيط، الجامع لما ذهب من كلام العرب شماطيط
- Language: Arabic
- Subject: Arabic language, Lexicography
- Genre: Dictionary
- Published: 14th century
- Publication place: Persia
- Media type: manuscript (original), print/digital (modern)

Al-Qāmūs al-Muḥīṭ (Arabic: القاموس المحيط, lit. 'The Encompassing Ōkeanós') is an Arabic dictionary compiled by the lexicographer and linguist, Abū al-Ṭāhir Majīd al-Dīn Muḥammad ibn Ya’qūb ibn Muḥammad ibn Ibrāhīm al-Shīrāzī al-Fīrūzābādī (1329–1414), commonly known as Firuzabadi.

== Description ==
Al-Firuzabadi originally intended to produce the largest dictionary, recording the complete language in sixty volumes. However, he ended up writing only two volumes, which nonetheless included sixty thousand entries. By being very frugal with his definitions and adding a number of abbreviations, such as m (for ma'ruf, "known") to denote words of common usage that required no additional lexicographical description or j (for jam, "plural"), he was able to fit many entries in a small space. Modern Arabic dictionaries still use some of these abbreviations. The Qamus became a very popular dictionary for private use, to the point where the Arabic word for "Qamus" which means "Ocean" has become the current word for "dictionary".

== Extension ==
The giant lexicon, Taj al-'Arus min Jawahir al-Qamus by Murtada al-Zabidi authored this work as an extension. He completed, revised, and expanded the al-Qamus al-Muhit, in order to compile a broad and comprehensive Arabic lexicon.

== Digital conversion ==
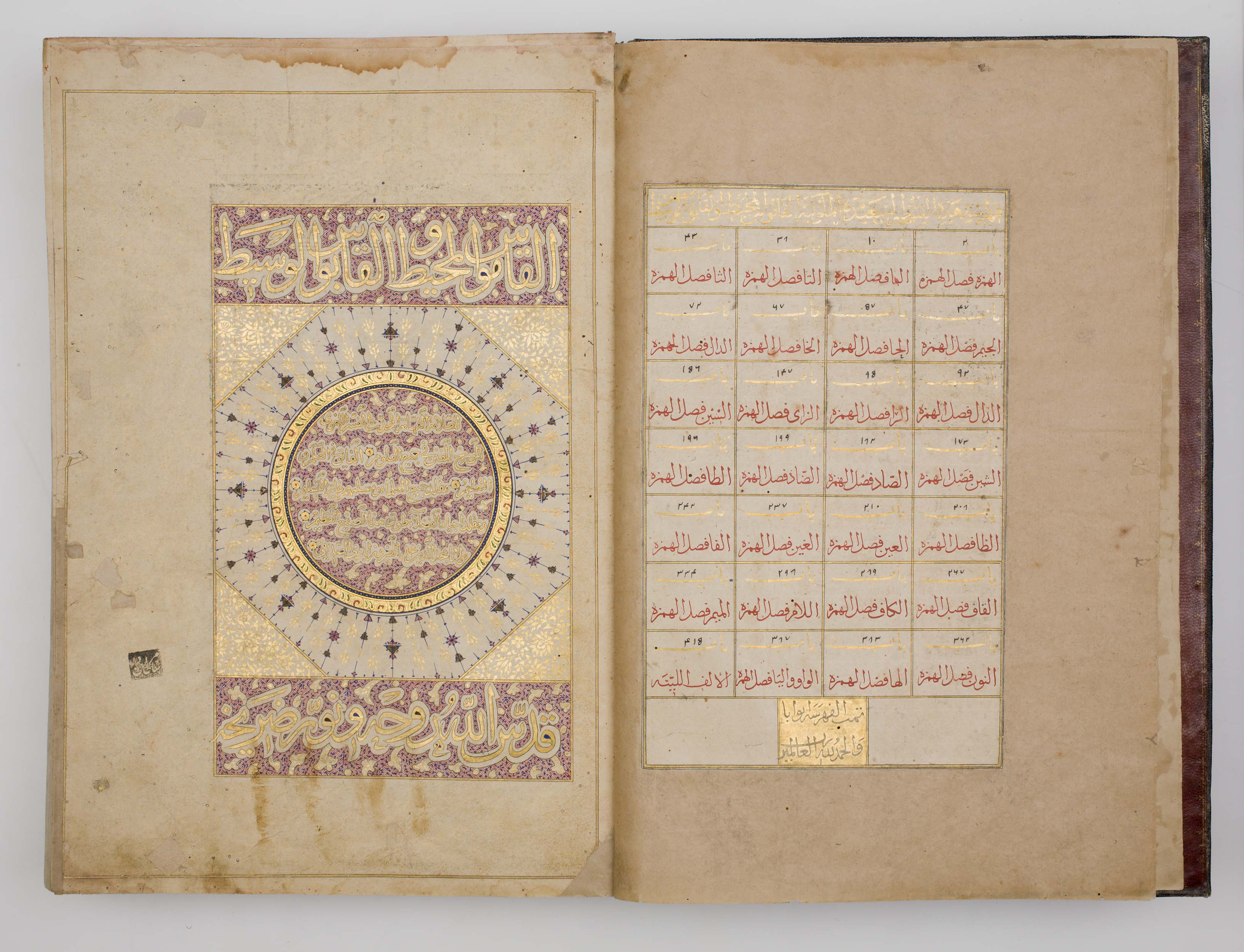
Title page and front page of a 16th-century manuscript of Al-Qāmūs al-Muḥīṭ

In recent years, efforts have been made to convert Al-Qāmūs al-Muḥīṭ into digital formats, such as the Lexical Markup Framework (LMF), to make it more accessible to modern researchers and scholars.
