= Ibn Sidah =

Arabic linguist, philologist, and lexicographer of Andalusia (1007–1066)

Ibn Sidah ابن سيده

Personal life
- Born: 1007 Murcia, Caliphate of Córdoba, Andalusia, now Spain
- Died: 26 March 1066 (25 RabīʿII 458), aged 59 Dénia, Taifa of Dénia
- Era: Islamic golden age
- Region: Iberian Peninsula
- Notable work: Al-Muḥkam wa-al-muḥīt al-aʻẓam
- Occupation: Scholar; lexicographer; linguist; philologist; logician

Religious life
- Religion: Islam
- Denomination: Sunni
- Jurisprudence: Maliki
- Creed: Ash'ari

Muslim leader
- Influenced by: Malik ibn Anas Abu Hasan al-Ash'ari Al-Farahidi
- Influenced: Ibn Manzur

Abū’l-Ḥasan ʻAlī ibn Ismāʻīl (أبو الحسن على بن اسماعيل), known as Ibn Sīdah (ابن سيده), or Ibn Sīdah'l-Mursī (ابن سيده المرسي), (c.1007-1066), was a linguist, philologist and lexicographer of Classical Arabic from Andalusia. He compiled the encyclopedia al-Kitāb al-Mukhaṣṣaṣ (المخصص) (Book of Customs) and the Arabic-language dictionary Al-Muḥkam wa-al-muḥīt al-aʻẓam (المحكم والمحيط الأعظم) ("the great and comprehensive arbiter"). His contributions to language, literature, and logic were considerable.

== Life ==
Ibn Sīdah was born in Murcia in eastern Andalusia. The historian Khalaf ibn ʻAbd al-Malik Ibn Bashkuwāl (ابن بشكوال) (1183-1101) in his book Kitāb aṣ-Ṣilah (كتاب الصلة) (Book of Relations) gives Ismāʻīl as the name of his father, in agreement with name given in the Mukhassas. However Al-Fath ibn Khaqan in mathmah al-anfus (مطمح الأنفس) has the name Aḥmad. Yaqut al-Hamawi in The Lexicon of Literature, says Ibn Sīdah ('son of a woman') was his nickname. Remarkably both he and his father were blind. His father was a sculptor although it seems the disciplines he devoted his life to, philology and lexicography, had been in his family.

Mohammed ibn Ahmed ibn Uthman Al-Dhahabi's biographic encyclopedia Siyar A'lam al-Nubala (سير أعلام النبلاء) (Lives of The Noble Scholars) is the main biographic source. He lived in the taifa principality of "Dénia and the Eastern Islands" (طائفة دانية والجزائر الشرقية) under the rule of Emir Mujahid al-Amiri al-Muwaffaq (الأمير مجاهد العامري) (1044-1014) and he travelled to Mecca and Medina. He studied in Cordova under the renowned grammarian Abu al-Sa'ad ibn al-Hasan al-Rubai al-Baghdadi (أبو العلاء صاعد بن الحسن الربعي البغدادي) (d.417AH/1026AD) exiled in Andalusia, and with Abu Omar al-Talmanki (أبي عمر الطلمنكي) (429-340AH). He died in Dénia.

== Works ==
- al-Mukhaṣṣaṣ (المخصص) 'Allowance' (20 vols)
- Al-Muḥkam wa-al-muḥīt al-ʾaʿẓam (المحكم والمحيط الأعظم) (Beirut, 2000); Arabic dictionary, 11 vols. A principal source for the famous Lisān al-ʿArab dictionary by the great thirteenth-century lexicographer Ibn Manzur.
- al-muḥkam wa al-muḥīṭ ul-ʾaʿẓam (المحكم والمحيط الأعظم) 'The Great Comprehensive Reference'
- al-ʾunīq (الأنيق) 'The Elegant'
- šarʿ ʾiṣlāḥ al-Muntaq (شرح إصلاح المنطق) 'Commentary on the Reform of Logic'
- šarʿ ma ʾaškāl min shaʿr al-Mutanabbī (شرح ما أشكل من شعر المتنبي) 'Commentary on Forms of al-Mutanabbi (al-Kindi)'s Poems'
- al-ʿalām fi l-luġa ʿala al-ʾaǧnās (العلام في اللغة على الأجناس) 'Science of Languages of Nations'
- al-ʿālam wa l-Mutaʿallam (العالم والمتعلم) 'Knowledge and the Student'
- al-Wāfī fi ʿalam ʾaḥkām al-Quwāfī (الوافي في علم أحكام القوافي) 'Science of Rhyme Provision'
- al-ʿawīs fi sharʿ ʾIslāḥ l-Munṭaq (العويص في شرح إصلاح المنطق) 'Sharp Explanation of Logic'
- šarʿ Kitāb al-ʾAḫfash (شرح كتاب الأخفش) 'Commentary on Book of the Hidden'
- as-samāʾ wa l-ʿālam (السماء والعالم) 'Heaven and Earth'
- al-ʿālam fi l-Luġah (العالم في اللغة) 'Philology'
- šawāḏ al-Luġah (شواذ اللغة) 'Oddities (outliers) of the Language'
- Al-Muḥkam wa l-Muḥīt al-ʾAʿẓam (المحكم والمحيط الأعظم) 'The Great and Comprehensive Arbitrator'.
