= Ibn Manzur =

Maghrebi Arab lexicographer of the Arabic language (c.1233-c.1312)

Ibn Manẓūr Arabic: إبن منظور

Personal life
- Born: June/July 1233 Ifriqiya, Maghreb
- Died: December 1311/ January 1312 (aged 78) Cairo, Mamluk Sultanate
- Region: North Africa
- Notable work: Lisān al-ʿArab
- Occupation: Scholar, Lexicographer, Judge in Tripoli, Libya and Egypt

Religious life
- Religion: Islam
- Denomination: Sunni
- Jurisprudence: Maliki
- Creed: Ash'ari

Muslim leader
- Influenced by: Malik ibn Anas Abu Hasan al-Ash'ari Ibn Sidah
- Influenced: Firuzabadi

Muhammad ibn Mukarram Muhaimin ibn Alī ibn Ahmad ibn Manzūr al-Ansārī al-Ifrīqī al-Misrī al-Khazrajī (Arabic: محمد بن مكرم بن علي بن أحمد بن منظور الأنصاري الإفريقي المصري الخزرجي) also known as Ibn Manẓūr (Arabic: إبن منظور) (June–July 1233 – December 1311/January 1312) was an Arab lexicographer of the Arabic language and author of a large dictionary, Lisan al-ʿArab (لسان العرب; lit. 'The Tongue of the Arabs')

== Biography ==
Ibn Manzur was born in 1233 in Ifriqiya (present day Tunisia). He was of Arab descent, from the Banu Khazraj tribe of Ansar as his nisba al-Ansārī al-Ifrīqī al-Misrī al-Khazrajī suggests. Ibn Hajar reports that he was a judge (qadi) in Tripoli, Libya and Egypt and spent his life as clerk in the Diwan al-Insha', an office that was responsible among other things for correspondence, archiving and copying. Fück assumes to be able to identify him with Muḥammad b. Mukarram, who was one of the secretaries of this institution (the so called Kuttāb al-Inshāʾ) under Qalawun. Following Brockelmann, Ibn Manzur studied philology. He dedicated most of his life to excerpts from works of historical philology. He is said to have left 500 volumes of this work. He died around the turn of the years 1311/1312 in Cairo.

== Works ==
=== Lisān al-ʿArab ===
Lisān al-ʿArab (لسان العرب, "The language of the Arabs") was completed by Ibn Manzur in 1290. Occupying 20 printed book volumes (in the most frequently cited edition), it is the best known dictionary of the Arabic language, as well as one of the most comprehensive. Ibn Manzur compiled it from other sources to a large degree. The most important sources for it were the Tahdhīb al-Lugha of Azharī, Al-Muḥkam of Ibn Sidah, Al-Nihāya of Ibn Athīr and Jauhari's Ṣiḥāḥ, as well as the ḥawāshī (glosses) of the latter (Kitāb at-Tanbīh wa-l-Īḍāḥ) by Ibn Barrī. It follows the Ṣiḥāḥ in the arrangement of the roots: The headwords are not arranged by the alphabetical order of the radicals as usually done today in the study of Semitic languages, but according to the last radical - which makes finding rhyming endings significantly easier. Furthermore, the Lisān al-Arab notes its direct sources, but not or seldom their sources, making it hard to trace the linguistic history of certain words. Murtaḍá al-Zabīdī corrected this in his Tāj al-ʿArūs, that itself goes back to the Lisān. The Lisān, according to Ignatius d'Ohsson, was already printed in the 18th century in Istanbul, thus fairly early for the Islamic world.

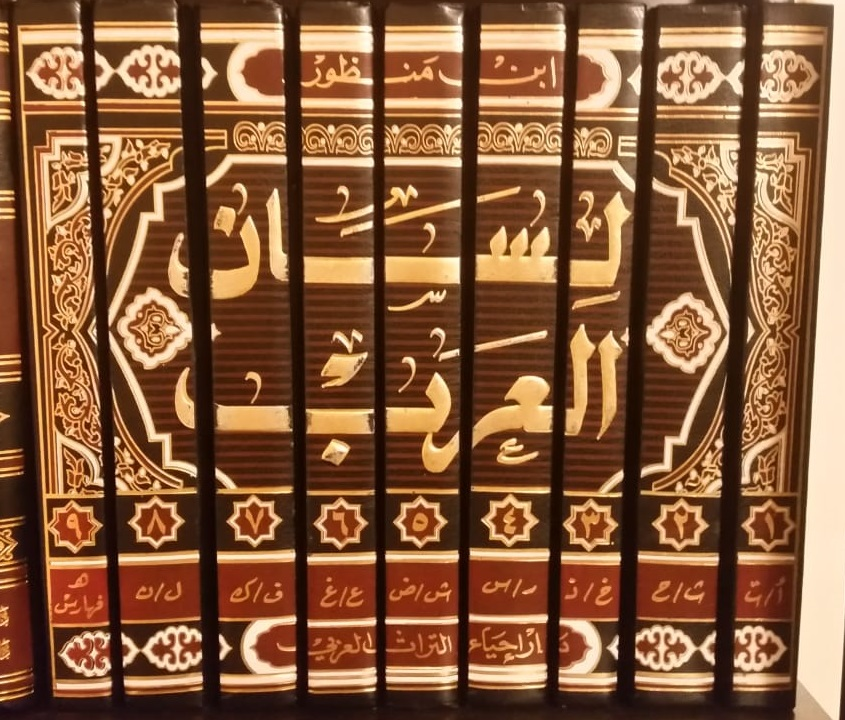
Lisan al Arab by Ibn Manzur (1233-1312)

==== Published editions of the Lisān al-'Arab ====
- Bullag Misr al-Matb'ah al-Kubra al-'Amiriyah Egypt; 1883, vol.,1
- Al-Maṭbaʿa al-Kubra al-Amirīya, Bulaq; 1883 - 1890, vols.,20
- Dar Sadir, Beirut; 1955 - 1956, vols.,15.
- Ādāb al-Ḥawza, Iran; 1984, vols.,18

=== Other works ===
- Aḫbār Abī Nuwās, a bio-bibliography of the Arabic-Persian poet Abu Nuwas; printed (with commentary by Muhammad Abd ar-Rasul) 1924 in Cairo as well as published by Shukri M. Ahmad 1952 in Baghdad.
- Muḫtaṣar taʾrīḫ madīnat Dimašq l-Ibn ʿAsākir, summary of the History of Damascus by Ibn 'Asakir.
- Muḫtaṣar taʾrīḫ madīnat Baġdād li-s-Samʿānī, summary of the History of Baghdad by al-Samʿānī (d. December 1166).
- Muḫtaṣar Ǧāmiʿ al-Mufradāt, summary of the treatise about remedies and edibles by al-Baiṭār.
- Muḫtār al-aġānī fi-l-aḫbār wa-t-tahānī, a selection of songs; printed 1927 in Cairo.
- Niṯār al-azhār fī l-layl wa-l-nahār, a short treatise on astronomy about day and night as well as the stars and zodiacs; printed 1880 in Istanbul.
- Taḏkirāt al-Labīb wa-nuzhat al-adīb (if following Fück identical with Muḥammad b. Mukarram), served al-Qalqaschandi as a source.

== Sources ==
- Carl Brockelmann: Geschichte der arabischen Litteratur. Volume II, Brill, Leiden ²1943, p. 21f as well as Supplement Volume II, Brill, Leiden 1938, p. 14f.
- Johann W. Fück: Art. Ibn Manẓūr, in: ²Encyclopaedia of Islam III (1971), p. 864.
- Jörg Krämer: Studien zur altarabischen Lexikographie: Nach Istanbuler und Berliner Handschriften, in: Oriens 6 (1953), p. 230f.
- Fuat Sezgin: Geschichte des arabischen Schrifttums. Volumes I - IX, Brill, Leiden 1964 - 1987.
