= Alanoud Alsharekh =

Kuwaiti women's rights activist

- Education: King's College London; School of Oriental and African Studies
- Awards: Ordre national du Mérite (2016); BBC 100 Women
- Scientific career
- Institutions: Chatham House; Ibtkar Strategic Consultancy; Kuwait University; Gulf University for Science and Technology; Arab Open University; Kuwait National Security Bureau
- Thesis: Angry words softly spoken: a comparative study of English and Arab women novelists (2003)
- Website: Alanoud Alsharekh

Alanoud Alsharekh (Arabic: العنود الشارخ) is a Kuwaiti women's rights activist and a founding member of Abolish 153 (also known as Abolish Article 153), a campaign calling to end honour killings in Kuwait. She has been awarded the Ordre national du Mérite and was one of the BBC 100 Women in 2019.

== Early life and education ==
Alsharekh was born in Kuwait. She studied at Al Bayan Bilingual School and would have graduated in 1992 but could not due to the invasion of Kuwait. She studied English literature at King's College London. She earned her bachelor's degree in 1996, before moving to SOAS University of London to study applied linguistics. She was supported by a scholarship from Kuwait University. She returned to Kuwait pregnant with her daughter at the same time that the suffrage movement was starting. When women lost their fight for full political rights in 1999, she returned at SOAS for her doctorate, focusing on comparative feminism and Middle Eastern studies.

== Career ==
After completing her PhD she was appointed a research associate at SOAS. She joined Uppsala University where she became interested in literature of the Middle East. She has served as a visiting academic and senior consultant at Uppsala University, Whittier College and Kuwait University. She was appointed to the Kuwait National Security Bureau in 2008.

Alsharekh is an Associate Fellow at Chatham House, where she leads a program called "Empowering Kuwaiti Women in Politics". She is simultaneously director of the Ibtkar Strategic Consultancy. In this capacity she has worked to support women's rights both in Kuwait and overseas. Ibtkar led the "Empowering Kuwaiti Women in Politics" program, which included a year of training for Kuwaiti women in political leadership. Alongside training women in Kuwait, Ibtkar has run culturally sensitive training for Great Ormond Street Hospital and the Royal College of Art.

Alongside her advocacy with Ibtkar, Alsharekh has served as director of the "Friends who Care" campaign for young girls who are at risk within the social care system of Kuwait. She has worked as a gender consultant for both UN Women and the United Nations Development Programme. She delivered a TED talk in Kuwait City where she spoke about her feminist activism. Alsharekh is the founding director of the "Abolish 153" campaign, that looks to end honour killings in Kuwait. She is also head of department at the Arab Open University. In 2018 she was made a non-resident fellow at The Arab Gulf States Institute. She serves on the advisory board of the Global Diplomatic Forum.

== Awards and honours ==
- 2013 Doha Institute for Graduate Studies Arab Prize in Social Science and Humanities Research for best publication in a foreign journal
- 2015 European Union Chaillot Prize for Human Rights
- 2016 Ordre national du Mérite
- 2019 Outstanding Arab Woman
- 2019 BBC 100 Women

== Selected publications ==
- Alsharekh, Alanoud (30 March 2011). "Reform and Rebirth in the Middle East". Global Politics and Strategy. 53 (2): 51–60. doi:10.1080/00396338.2011.571010. S2CID 154849220.
- Alanoud, Alsharekh (2012). Popular Culture and Political Identity in the Arab Gulf States. Saqi. ISBN 978-0863568626.
- Alanoud, Alsharekh (2005). Challenging Limitations: Conference on the Redefinition of Roles for Women in the GCC. Saffron Books. ISBN 1872843352.
