= Firuzabadi =

14th-century lexicographer and polymath

Imam al-Firuzabadi
- الفيروزآبادي
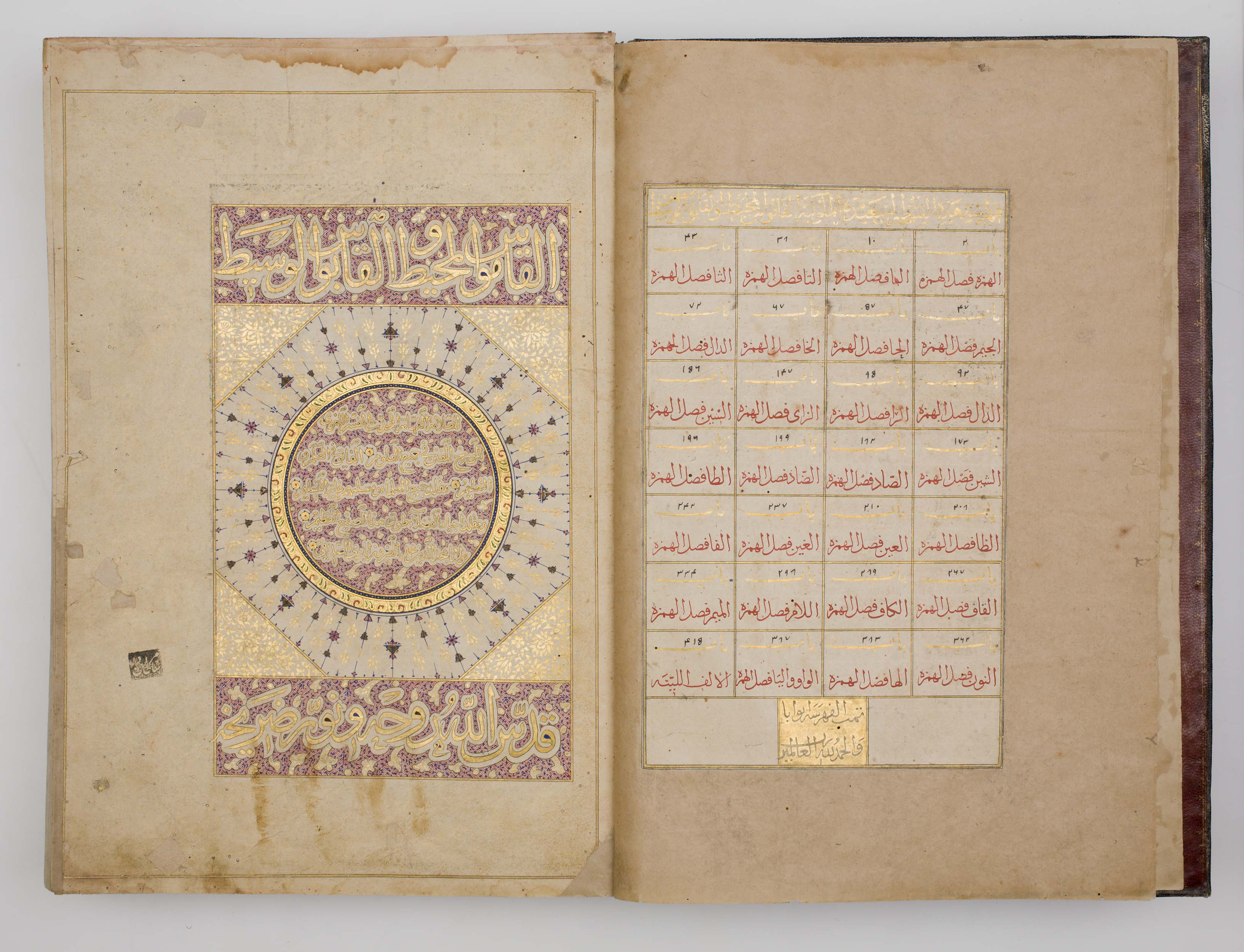
- Folio from a 16th-century manuscript of the Al-Qāmūs al-Muḥīṭ Khalili Collection of Hajj and the Arts of Pilgrimage
- Title: Majd al-Din; Al-Ḥāfiẓ

Personal life
- Born: 1329 CE Kazerun, Iran
- Died: 1414 (aged 84–85) Zabid, Yemen
- Era: Middle Ages
- Region: Middle East
- Main interest(s): Lexicography, Linguistic, Arabic grammar, Philology, Arabic literature, Hadith, History, Islamic jurisprudence, Poetry
- Notable work: Al-Qamus al-Muhit
- Occupation: Polymath, Lexicographer, Linguist, Traditionist, Litterateur, Historian

Religious life
- Religion: Islam
- Denomination: Sunni
- Jurisprudence: Shafi'i
- Creed: Ash'ari

Muslim leader
- Influenced by: Al-Shafi'i Abu al-Hasan al-Ash'ari Ibn Manzur Taqi al-Din al-Subki Salah al-Din al-Ala'i
- Influenced: Ibn Hajar al-Asqalani Murtada al-Zabidi

Firuzabadi (Persian: فيروزآبادي lit. 'from Firuzabad'; 1329–1414), whose proper name was Abu 'l-Ṭāhir Muḥammad ib Yaʿqūb ibn Muḥammad ibn Ibrāhīm Majd al-Dīn al-Shāfiʿī al-Shīrāzī (Persian: فیروزآبادی), was a Persian Sunni Muslim polymath. He excelled in hadith, grammar, philology, history, literature, poetry and Islamic jurisprudence. He was a revered narrator and preserver of Prophetic traditions. Regarded as a major linguist and one of the prominent scholars of the 15th century. He was one of the leading lexicographers in the medieval Islamic world. He was the compiler of Al-Qāmūs al-Muḥīṭ "The Encompassing Ōkeanós", a comprehensive Arabic dictionary which, for nearly five centuries, was one of the most widely used.

== Name ==
Known simply as Muḥammad ibn Ya'qūb al-Fīrūzābādī (محمد بن يعقوب الفيروزآبادي), his nisbas "al-Shīrāzī" and "al-Fīrūzābādī" refer to the cities of Shiraz (located near Kazerun, his place of birth) and Firuzabad (his father's hometown) in Fars, Persia, respectively.

== Lineage ==
Al-Furazabadi claims to be a descendent of Abu Ishaq al-Shirazi and ultimately from Abu Bakr, one of the famous Companions of the Prophet.

== Life ==
Al-Firuzabadi was born in Kazerun, Fars, Persia in the year 729/1328. In his hometown of Karzin, Al-Firuzabadi received his early schooling from his father. Al-Furazabadi memorized the Quran at the age of seven and studied Quranic recitation, Hadith, Arabic grammar, and literature in the scholarly hubs of Shiraz, Wasit, and Baghdad during the year (735-50/1336-49). Al-Firuzabadi's early professors included Muhammad b. Yusuf al-Zaradni (d. 747/1346) and 'Umar b. Ali al-Qazwini (d. 750/1349). Al-Firuzabadi studied under the major Shafi'i ulama Taqi al-Din al-Subki and his son Taj al-Din al-Subki in Damascus in 750/1349. He then travelled to Jerusalem, where he studied under prominent scholars of the day, including Salah al-Din al-Ala'i (d. 76/1359) and Taqi al-Din al-Kalkashandi (d. 821/1418).

Additionally, he journeyed to Cairo and studied under al-Kalanisi (d. 765/1363), Izz al-Din Ibn Jama'ah (d. 767/1365), Ibn Hisham al-Ansari, and Ibn Nubata. However, he also taught Jamal al-Din al-Isnawi, Ibn Hajar al-Asqalani, and Abd Allah ibn Abd al-Rahman ibn Aqil. Al-Firuzabadi travelled to Mecca in 770/1370 and remained there for fourteen years. He then spent the next five years in Delhi, India. He returned to Mecca and visited Baghdad and Shiraz one more tim (where he was received by Timur) and finally travelled to Yemen which took place in 796/1394. He spent fourteen months in Taiz in Yemen. In 1395, he was appointed chief qadi (judge) of Yemen by Al-Ashraf Umar II, who had summoned him from India a few years before to teach in his capital. Al-Ashraf's marriage to a daughter of Firūzābādī added to Firuzabadi's prestige and power in the royal court. In his latter years, Firūzābādī converted his house at Mecca, and appointed three teachers, to a school of Maliki law. Al-Firuzabadi died in the year 817/1414 in Zabid, Yemen.

== Legacy ==
Al-Firuzabadi was the final authority in lexicographical history to cite his sources for each factual information he documented. There are around fifty references to the earlier lexicographical works in this collection. Al-Firuzabadi was so troubled by the requirements for a valid entry that he went so far as to enumerate the line of transmission from himself to Ibn Hajar, who obtained it verbally from al-Firuzabadi.

Long after his passing, al-Firuzabadi's significant contribution to the evolution of lexicography in Egypt persisted. This was particularly the case for Hadith scholars in later times. But he wasn't by himself. Al-Sabban, who trained under al-Firuzabadi, likewise blended philological research with hadith study. Fakhr al-Din b. Muhammad Tuwayh was another writer who worked in lexicography and hadith during al-Firuzabadi's time. He wrote "Mama' al-Bahrayn wa Malta' al-Nitrayn," which was written to address the ambiguities in the Qur'an and Hadith.

== Sufism and relations with Ibn Arabi ==
Firuzabadi composed several poems lauding Ibn Arabi for his writings, including the "وما علي إن قلت معتقدي دع الجهول يظن العدل عدوانا". Ibn Arabi's works inspired Firūzābādī's intense interest in Sufism.

== Selected works ==
He was a prolific writer and wrote more than sixty books in the sciences of the Quran, Hadith, language, and other fields including:

- Muhammad ibn al-Yaqub, Firuzabadi. Qamus al-Muhit. Resalah Publishing. p. 1536. ISBN 978-9-933-44666-6.("The Surrounding Ocean"); his principal literary legacy is this voluminous dictionary, which amalgamates and supplements two great dictionaries; Al-Muhkam by Ibn Sida (d. 1066) and Al-ʿUbab (العباب الزاخر واللباب الفاخر) by al-Saghānī (d. 1252). Al-Saghānī's dictionary had itself supplemented the seminal medieval Arabic dictionary of Al-Jawharī (d. ca. 1008), titled al-Sihah. Firūzābādī also produced a concise simplified edition using a terse notation system and omitting grammatical examples of usage and some rarer definitions. The larger-print-two-volume concise dictionary proved much more popular than the vast Lisan al-Arab dictionary of Ibn Manzur (d. 1312) with its numerous quotations and usage examples.
- Al-Bulghah fī tārīkh a'immat al-lughah (البلغة في تراجم أئمة النحو واللغة) (Damascus 1972, in Arabic).
- Tabaqat Al-Hanafiyyah, a biography of Hanafi scholars.
- Fath Al-Bari bi-Al-Sayl Al-Faseh Al-Jari, a commentary on Sahih al-Bukhari.
- Basair Dhaw Al-Tamyeez fi Lata’if Al-Kitab Al-Aziz, a book on weak hadiths in four volumes.
- Safar Al-Sa’adah, a Hadith book on the Prophetic biographies.
- Adda Al-Ahkam fi Umdat Al-Ahkam by Al-Maqdisi
- Al-Marqat Al-Wafiya fi Tabaqat Al-A’immah Al-Hanafiyyah
- Al-Isharat ila Ma Fi Kutubul Al-Fiqh Min Al-Asma' Wa Al-Amaan Wa Al-Lughaat
- Al-Lami' Al-Mu’allim Al-Ajab, Al-Jami' Bayn Al-Muhkam Wa Al-Abab in sixty volumes, and it was said that it was a hundred volumes, and he summarized it in (Al-Qamus Al-Muhit)
