= Murtada al-Zabidi =

Islamic polymath (1732–1790)

Imam Murtada al-Zabidi مرتضى الزبيدي
- Title: Al-Ḥāfiẓ

Personal life
- Born: 1732 Bilgram, Hardoi, Uttar Pradesh, India
- Died: 1790 (aged 57–58) Cairo, Egypt
- Era: Early modern period
- Main interest(s): Hadith, Lexicography, Linguist, Philology, Genealogy, History, Theology, Tasawwuf, Geography, Medicine
- Notable work(s): Tāj al-ʻĀrūs min Jawāhir al-Qāmūs; Itḥāf al-Sadāh al-Muttaqīn; Asānīd al-Kutub as-Sittah
- Occupation: Muslim scholar, Muhaddith, philologist, linguist, lexicographer, genealogist, biographer, historian, mystic, theologian

Religious life
- Religion: Islam
- Denomination: Sunni
- Jurisprudence: Hanafi
- Creed: Maturidi

Muslim leader
- Influenced by: Abu Hanifa Abu Mansur al-Maturidi Al-Ghazali Fairuzabadi Ibn Hajar al-Asqalani Shah Waliullah Dehlawi

Al-Murtaḍá al-Husaynī al-Zabīdī (Arabic: المرتضى الحسيني الزبيدي), or Muḥammad ibn Muḥammad Murtaḍá al-Zabīdī (1732–1790 / 1145–1205 AH), also known as Murtada al-Zabidi, was an Indian Sunni polymath based in Cairo. He was a Hanafi scholar, hadith specialist, philologist, linguist, lexicographer, genealogist, biographer, historian, mystic and theologian. He was considered one of the leading intellectuals of the 18th century. He was also regarded as the greatest Hadith scholar of his time and one of the foremost philologists of the Arab post-classical era.

== Biography ==
Murtaḍá was born in 1732 (1145AH) in Bilgram, Hardoi, Uttar Pradesh, India. His family originated from Wasit in Iraq, from where his parents had emigrated to the Hadramawt region in the east of Yemen – where the Husaynī tribe is situated. Murtaḍá earned his nisba 'al-Zabīdī' from Zabīd in the south western coastal plains of Yemen, which was a centre of academic learning where he had spent time studying. He began studying Hadith in Delhi under the most prominent scholar of his time, Shah Waliullah Dehlawi. He travelled to Hejaz (Jeddah, Mecca and Madinah) and then settled in Egypt. He was renowned in the Islamic world. Rulers from Hejaz, India, Yemen, Levant, Iraq, Morocco, Turkey, Sudan and Algiers corresponded with him; people sent him presents and gifts from everywhere. He was revered and admired so much that some people in Western Africa believed that their Hajj was incomplete if they did not plan to see Murtađa Zabīdī. He died in Cairo during an epidemic plague in the year 1205 AH/1790 CE.

== Reception ==
Al-Kattānī states in his book Fahris al-Fahāris: “Zabīdī was peerless in his time and age. None after Ibn al-Ĥajar al-Ásqalāni and his students can match Az-Zabīdī in terms of his encyclopaedic knowledge of (Prophetic) traditions and its associated sciences; nor in fame or list of students.”

Zabidi's immense proficiency of diverse sciences and his thriving trade with books as well as with his own writings was described with commendation by one of his Maghribi visitors, Ibn 'Abdal al-Salam al-Nasiri:

He was master of [Collections of] hadith, tafsir, Arabic lexigraphy and other diverse sciences, unequalled by any of those scholars whom we met in the East or West [...] You find him continuously buying and copying against payment, borrowing books from remote regions, other books being sent to him as presents. Apart from that he makes gifts and donations. [...] He is a highly prolific author. By Allah (God), he is indeed the Suyuti of his time, like Suyuti himself or Ibn Sahin and Ibn Hajar far beyond ordinary men. (Even) if those came together with him, they would surely admit that superiority is not with the first ones (al-Fadila lam tankin li'l-uwal).

== Works ==
As a polymath and prolific writer, his works cover a range of topics:

- Tāj al-ʻĀrūs min Jawāhir al-Qāmūs ["The Bride's Crown from the Pearls of the Dictionary)"]; an expansion of Fairuzabadi's Al-Qamoos, the most frequently cited dictionary of Classical Arabic after Lisān al-ʿArab by Ibn Manẓūr.
- Itḥāf al-Sadāh al-Muttaqīn ["Presents from Pious Chieftains"], the most comprehensive commentary on al-Ghazali's famous Ihya 'Ulum al-Din. It was published in 14 volumes recently and is the second of Zabīdī’s two masterpieces.
- Asānīd al-Kutub as-Sittah ["The Authentication Chains of the Six Books"]: Bukhari, Muslim, Tirmidhi, Nasayi, Abū Dawud, Ibn Majah are the six motherbooks of Ĥadīth and termed as Kutub al-Sittah. Zabidi collected the narrators and their chains in this book as is apparent from the title.
- Úqūd al-Jawāhir al-Munīfah fī Adillati Madh’hab al-Imām Abū Ĥanīfah ["Stringing the Blessed Pearls on the Evidences used in the Madh’hab of Abū Ĥanīfah"]
- Kashf al-Lithām an Ādāb al-Īmān wa’l Islām ["Raising the Curtain on Etiquette in Faith and Islām"]
- Raf’á ash-Shakwā wa Tarwīĥ al-Qulūb fī Dhikr Mulūki Banī Ayyūb ["Removing the Grievance and Comforting the Hearts in the mention of the Kings of Bani Ayyub"]
- Mújam ash-Shuyūkh ["A Dictionary of Zabīdī’s Teachers"]
- Alfiyyah as-Sanad ["A Thousand Liner on Chains of Authentication"] in Ĥadīth; which is a poem of more than 1500 lines and its explanation.
- Mukhtaşar al-Áyn ["An abridgement of Al-Áyn"], the book al-Ayn is attributed to Khalil Ibn Aĥmed, the grammarian [d.175AH].
- At-Takmalah wa’s Şilah wa’dh Dhayl li’l Qāmūs ["Completion, Supplement and Appendix to the dictionary Al-Qāmūs"] in two hefty volumes.
- Īđāh al-Madārik bi’l Ifşaĥ áni’l Áwātik ["Shedding Light on the Senses about Noble Women"]; a monograph.
- Íqd al-Jumān fī Bayāni Shuáb al-Īmān ["String of Pearls: A Description of the book ‘Branches of Faith’"]
- Tuĥfatu’l Qamāýīl fī Mad’ĥi Shaykh al-Árab Ismāýīl ["Present of Chieftains in Praise of the Grandfather of Arabs Sayyidunā Ismāýīl álayhi’s salām"]
- Taĥqīq al-Wasāyil li Márifati’l Makātabāt wa’r Rasāyil ["An Analysis of the Means for Knowledge of Letters and Epistles"]
- Jadhwatu’l Iqtibās fī Nasabi Banī al-Ábbās ["An Extracted Ember on the Genealogy of Bani Abbas"]
- Ĥikmatu’l Ishrāq ilā Kuttāb al-Āfāq ["Sparkling Wisdom for Writers of the World] : A book on calligraphy.
- Ar-Rawđ al-Miýţār fī Nasabi’s Sādati Āli Jáfar at-Ţayyār ["A Fragrant Garden: On the Genealogy of the Descendants of Jáfar at-Ţayyār"]
- Muzīl an-Niqāb al-Khafā’a án Kunā Sādātinā Banī Al-Wafā’a ["Removing the Concealing Veil on the Apellation of our Lords from Bani Wafa"] which was probably also named as: Rafá an-Niqāb al-Khafā’a ámman Intamā ilā Wafā wa Abi’l Wafā ["Raising the Hiding Veil from those who are related to Abi’l Wafā"]
- Bulghātu’l Gharīb fī Muştalaĥi Āthār al-Ĥabīb: ["The Necessary Provision for the Stranger: in Understanding the Terminology of the Beloved’s Tradition şallAllāhu álayhi wa sallam"]
- Tanbīh al-Áārif al-Başīr álā Asrāri’l Ĥizb al-Kabīr ["A Warning to the Discerning Knower on the Secrets of ‘The Great Collection’"] on the Hizb of Imām Shādhilī.
- Safīnatu’n Najāh Al-Muĥtawiyah álā Biđāátin Muzjāh mina’l Fawāyidi’l Muntaqāh ["The Rescue Ship Carrying Rare Provisions from the ‘Distinguished Benefits’"] probably a commentary on the book Al-Fawāyid al-Muntaqāh by Shaykh Abū Ábdullāh Al-Qāsim Ibn Fađl ath-Thaqafī al-Aşbahāni [d.489AH/1095CE] – a book on Ĥadīth.
- Ghāyatu’l Ibtihāj li Muqtafī Asānīdi Muslim ibn Al-Ĥajjāj ["Intense Joy for the Follower of the Chains of Muslim ibn Al-Hajjaj"]
- Íqd al-La’ālī al-Mutanāthirah fi’l Aĥādīth al-Mutawātirah ["A Necklace of Scattered Pearls: A Collection of Massively Transmitted Ĥadīth"]
- Nishwatu’l Irtiyāĥ fī Bayāni Ĥaqīqati’l Maysiri wa’l Aqdāĥ ["Exulting in Gratification: An Exposition on the Reality of Gambling and Drinking"]
- Al-Árāyis al-Majluwwah fi Dhikri Awliyā’yi Fuwwah [Presenting the Resplendent Grooms – Chronicles of the Awliya of Fuwwah]: Fuwwah is a well-known place in Yemen.
- It’ĥāf al-Ikhwān fī Ĥukmi’d Dukhān ["Presents to Bretheren on the Ruling of Smoking"]
- Irshādu’l Ikhwān ila’l Akhlāq al-Ĥisān ["Guide to Bretheren towards Lofty Character and Morals"]
- Al-Ishghāf bi’l Ĥadīth al-Musalsal bi’l Ashrāf ["Fondness : about those Ĥadīth transmitted only through the Noble Progeny"]
- Iklīl al-Jawāhir al-Ghāliyah fī Riwāyati’l Aĥādīth al-Áāliyah ["A Crown of Precious Gems concerning the Transmission of Lofty Traditions"]
- Tuĥfatu’l Mawdūd fī Khatmi Sunan Abū Dāwūd ["Present of the Beloved in the Conclusion of Sunan Abū Dāwūd"]
- Ĥusn al-Muĥāđarah fī Ādābi’l Baĥthi wa’l Muĥāđarah ["A Beautiful Sermon on the Etiquette of Debate and Discussion"]
- Badhl al-Maj’hūd fī Takhrīji Ĥadīth ‘Shayyabatnī Hūd ["Expending Efforts in the Analysis of the Ĥadīth: ‘The Sūrah Hūd has Greyed Me’"]
- It’ĥāf al-Aşfiyā bi Silāki’l Awliyā’a [Presents of the Pure on the Chains of Awliya]
- It’ĥāf Ahl al-Islām bimā Yatállaqu bi’l Muşţafā wa Āli Baytihi’l Kirām ["Presents of Muslims Concerning Muşţafā and His Noble Household"]
- It’ĥāf Sayyidu’l Ĥayy bi Salāsili Banī Ţayy ["Presents of the Living Masters on the Chains of Banu Tayy"]
- Al-Iĥtifāl bi Şawmi’s Sitti min Shawwāl ["The Rejoicing in the Additional Six Fasts of Shawwal"]
- Al-Arbaúūn al-Mutakhallafah fīmā Warada fi’l Aĥādīth fī Dhikri Árafah ["The Forty Inherited Ĥadīth that have been reported mentioning Arafah"]
- Isáāf al-Ashrāf ["The Aid of The Progeny"]
- Isáāf ar-Rāghibīn fī Sīrati’l Muşţafā wa Āli Baytihi’t Tāhirīn ["Salvation of the Aspirants on the Path of Muşţafā and his Pure Household"]
- Iýlām al-Aálām bi Manāsiki Bayti’llāhi’l Ĥarām ["Declaration of the Knowledgeable on the Rituals of the Sacred House of Allāh"]
- Manāqib Aş’ĥāb al-Ĥadīth ["Merits and Praise of the Scholars of Ĥadīth"]
- Al-Intişār Li Wālidi’n Nabiyyi’l Mukhtār ["In Advocacy the Father of the Chosen Prophet şallAllāhu álayhi wa sallam"]
- At-Tálīqah álā Musalsalāti Ibn Álīqah ["A Commentary on the Chains of Ibn Aliqah"]
- At-Taftīsh fī Mánā Lafž ‘Durwīsh’ ["An Investigation in the meaning of the word ‘Durwish’ or the ‘Mendicant’"]
- Tansīq Qalāyid al-Matan fī Taĥqīqi Kalāmi’sh Shādhilī Abi’l Ĥasan ["Organizing the Sturdy Necklaces in the Study of the Sayings of Abū’l Ĥasan Shadhili"]
- Ĥadīqatu’s Şafā fī Wāliday al-Muşţafā şallAllāhu álayhi wa sallam ["The Immaculate Gardens : Concerning the Parents of Muşţafā şallAllāhu álayhi wa sallam"]
- Rashfu Zulāl ar-Raĥīq fi Nasabi Hađrati’s Şiddīq rađiyAllāhu ánhu ["Imbibing the Pure Nectar : concerning the Ancestry of Abū Bakr as-Siddiq rađiyAllāhu ánhu"]
- Rashqatu’l Mudām al-Makhtūm al-Bikri min Şafwati Zulāli Şibghi’l Quţub al-Bakrī ["Sealed Wine from the Cleanliness of a Pure Flavored Drink of the Spiritual Pole Al-Bakri"]
- Rafú’sh Shakwā Li Áālimi’s Sirri wa’n Najwā ["Raising a Complaint towards the Knower of the Open and Hidden"]
- Rafú’l Kalal áni’l Ílal ["Removing the Exhaustion in the matter of Justification"] assuming that ílal is not ‘disease.’
- Zahr al-Akmām al-Munshaq án Juyūbi’l Ilhām bi Sharĥi Şayghati Ábd as-Salām ["A Lone Flower from the Pockets of Inspiration in the Explanation of Ábd as-Salām’s Formula"]
- Sharĥ as-Şadr fī Sharĥ Asmāyi Ahli Badr ["Expanding of the Chest concerning the names of those who participated in the expedition of Badr"]
- Al-Arūş al-Mujliyyah fī Ţuruqi Ĥadīth al-Awwaliyyah ["Shining Brides concerning the Chains of the ‘First Ĥadīth’"]
- Al-Íqd ath-Thamīn fī Ţuruqi’l Ilbāsi wa’t Talqīn ["A Precious String concerning the Paths of Wearing Cloaks and Instruction"]
- Áqīlatu’l Atrāb fī Sanadi’t Ţarīqati wa’l Aĥzāb ["Lords of the Same Age: Concerning the ‘Path’ and the ‘Groups’"]
- Qalansuwatu’t Tāj ["A Diadem"]
- Al-Qawl al-Mathbūt fī Taĥqīqi Lafži’t Tābūt ["Veritable Statement researching the etymology of the word ‘Ark’"]
- Kashf al-Ghiţā án Şalāti’l Wustā ["Lifting the Curtain to reveal the ‘Middle Prayer’"]
- Luqat al-La’ālī mina’l Jawhar al-Ghāli [Gleaning of Pearls from a Treasure of Priceless Gems]
- Al-Murabbī al-Kābili fīman Rawā án Shams al-Bābilī ["The Short Master concerning that which has been narrated from Shams al-Babeli"]
- Al-Mirqāt al-Áliyyah bi Sharĥi’l Ĥadīth al-Musalsal bi’l Awwaliyyah ["The Lofty Steps in Explanation of the Continuously Narrated First Ĥadīth"]
- Al-Maqām al-Índiyyah fi’l Mashāhid an-Naqshbandiyyah ["The Station of ‘Nearness’ near the Stations of the Naqshbandis"]
- Al-Minaĥ al-Áliyyah fi’t Ţarīqati’n Naqshbandiyyah ["Lofty Presents Concerning the Naqshbandi Path"]
- Minaĥ al-Fuyūđāt al-Wafiyyah fīmā min Sūrati’r Raĥmān min Asrāri’ş Şifati’l Ilāhiyyah ["Exuberant and Lavish Gifts : concerning the Secrets of the Attributes of the Lord Almighty in the Chapter Ar-Raĥmān"]
- Al-Mawāhib al-Jalīlīyyah fīmā Yatállaqu bi Ĥadīth al-Awwaliyyah ["Prominent Presents: concerning the First Hadith"]
- Mawāhibu Rabb al-Bariyyah Bi’l Imlāyi’sh Shaykhūniyyah ["Presents of the Lord of the Universe concerning the Dictation of Shaykhuniyyah"]
- An-Nafĥatu’l Qudsiyyah fī Wāsitati’l Biđáti’l īýd ar-Rūsiyyah ["Ethereal Breeze: concerning the Innovation of the Russian Festival"]
- An-Nawāfiĥ al-Miskiyyah ála’l Fawāyiĥ al-Kishkiyyah ["Fragrance of Musk on the Perfume of Kishk"]
- Hadiyyatu’l Ikhwān fī Shajarati’d Dukhān ["A Gift to the Bretheren: Concerning the Tobacco Weed"]
