= Tafsir Ibn Juzayy =

Classical Sunni tafsir of the Qur'an

Al-Tashil li-'Ulum al-Tanzil
- Author: Ibn Juzayy
- Original title: التسهيل لعلوم التنزيل
- Language: Arabic
- Genre: Tafsir
- Publisher: Dar al-Fikr
- Publication place: Beirut, Lebanon
- Pages: 832

Al-Tashil li Ulum al-Tanzil (Arabic: التسهيل لعلوم التنزيل, romanized: Facilitation of the Sciences of Revelation), better known as Tafsir Ibn Juzayy (Arabic: تفسير ابن جُزَيّ), is a classical Sunni tafsir of the Qur'an, authored by the Maliki-Ash'ari scholar Ibn Juzayy.

Tafsīr Ibn Juzayy stands as one of the final comprehensive Qurʾānic commentaries produced in al-Andalus. It is a concise yet wide-ranging tafsīr positioned at an intermediate level, combining both the transmitted (al-maʾthūr) and rational (al-raʾy) methods of exegesis. Distinguished by its clarity of expression and accessibility, it integrates multiple scholarly disciplines connected to Qurʾānic interpretation. The work achieves a careful equilibrium between conciseness and analytical depth, steering clear of both excessive elaboration and undue simplification.

== Description ==
Although Ibn Juzayy's tafsir is concise, it discusses theological issues (kalam), analyzes and critiques transmitted narrations (riwayat), and addresses linguistic, recitation (qira'at), and jurisprudential (fiqh) differences without getting into excessive detail. One of the features that makes this tafsir stand out is its two prefaces, which contain information related to the Quranic sciences ('ulum al-Quran) and the principles of exegesis (usul al-tafsir). In the first preface, after explaining his methodology in detail, Ibn Juzayy addresses topics such as the main subjects of the Quran, the history of the Quran, the levels of exegetes (mufassirin), and the reasons for their differences. The main subjects covered in this preface are the sciences related to the Quran, such as tafsir, qira'at, grammar (nahw), Arabic rhetoric (balagha ), hadith (prophetic traditions), ahkam (rulings), qasas (stories), tasawwuf (Sufism), usul al-din (principles of religion), usul al-fiqh (principles of jurisprudence), nasikh-mansukh (abrogating and abrogated verses), i'jaz al-Quran (inimitability of the Quran), Asbab al-Nuzul (occasions or circumstances of revelation), and fada'il al-Quran (merits of the Quran). In the second preface of the tafsir, the exegete explains words that appear frequently in the Quran but are difficult to understand or have an ambiguous meaning, arranging them in Arabic alphabetical order.

Although Ibn Juzayy and his tafsīr did not receive extensive recognition from later scholars such as al-Suyūṭī, his work nonetheless influenced subsequent exegetes. It is notably cited by Sulaymān ibn ʿUmar al-ʿAjīlī (d. 1204/1790) in his Ḥāshiyah on Tafsīr al-Jalālayn, and it left its mark on modern scholars like al-Ṣābūnī (d. 1442/2021) in Ṣafwat al-tafāsīr.

== Features ==
Tafsir Ibn Juzayy, edited by 'Abd Allah al-Khalidi, 2 vols (Beirut: Dar al-'Arqam, 1995)

Ibn Juzayy explains in detail the methods he followed in his tafsir, titled al-Tashil. These features are as follows:

1. In the tafsir al-Tashil, he aimed to create a concise commentary by drawing on knowledge that embodies the essence of many sciences and arts. For this reason, phrases were kept short, and unnecessary elaborations and repetitions were avoided.
2. The tafsir includes subtle points (nukta) and interesting topics rarely found in books, which originate either from the views of earlier scholars or entirely from the exegete's own reasoning.
3. He attempted to solve problems that exist in certain topics, eliminate ambiguities, and thus explain obscure issues.
4. He evaluated the different views of exegetes on a topic and tried to determine the most preferable opinion. Ibn Juzayy divided the opinions expressed by scholars into different categories: "sound opinion (sahih), false opinion (batil), and opinion with the possibility of being sound or false". Regarding views with a possibility of being sound or false, he used specific phrases in his tafsir, such as: خطـأ (khata'): "error", باطـل (batil): "false", ضعيـف (da'if): "weak", بعيـد (ba'id): "far-fetched", أرجـح غـره (arjahu ghayruhu): "another is more preferable", أقـوى غـره (aqwa ghayruhu): "another is stronger", غـره أظهـر (ghayruhu azhar): "another is clearer", غـره أشـهر (ghayruhu ashhar): "another is more famous". He included such expressions to clarify the status of different opinions.
5. He also stated that he placed the preferred opinion first and sometimes conveyed non-preferred opinions with phrases like "كـذا قيـل" (kadha qila), meaning "it was also said." As a method, Ibn Juzayy occasionally mentioned the name of the scholar for an opinion but was careful not to include views he found wrong or erroneous in his work.

== Literary sources ==
Ibn Juzayy drew extensively from a wide range of sources spanning multiple disciplines. His principal reference was the tafsīr of Ibn ʿAṭiyyah (d. 531/1137), al-Muḥarrar al-wajīz, which he regarded as one of the finest works of Qurʾānic commentary. The influence of Ibn ʿAṭiyyah is clearly visible in Ibn Juzayy's treatment of linguistic, grammatical, theological, and juristic issues. Although he relied heavily on this text, Ibn Juzayy engaged critically with its content—sometimes adopting Ibn ʿAṭiyyah's positions and at other times preferring alternative views.

Another major influence was al-Zamakhshari (d. 538/1144) al-Kashshāf, from which Ibn Juzayy drew insights particularly in language, rhetoric, and subtle exegetical analysis. Nevertheless, he cautioned readers regarding al-Zamakhsharī's theological errors while still evaluating his interpretations with scholarly discernment.

Among the additional tafsīr works Ibn Juzayy consulted were Jāmiʿ al-bayān by al-Ṭabarī (d. 310/923), al-Kashf wa al-bayān by al-Thāʿlabī (d. 427/1035), and al-Hidāyah by Makkī ibn Abī Ṭālib (d. 437/1046), though he utilized them to varying degrees. For mystical reflections, his chief source was the tafsīr of al-Ghaznawī (d. 560/1165), which he praised for its remarkable insights into taṣawwuf.

In his treatment of qirāʾāt and other areas of ʿulūm al-Qurʾān, Ibn Juzayy relied on works such as those of Abū ʿAmr al-Dānī (d. 444/1053), al-Ḥujjah by al-Fārisī (d. 377/987), and al-Taʿrīf wa al-iʿlām by al-Suhayli (d. 581/1185). His linguistic discussions drew from the foundational works of al-Farrāʾ (d. 207/822) and al-Zajjāj (d. 311/923) on maʿānī al-Qurʾān, as well as Ibn Qutaybah's (d. 206/824) Gharīb al-Qurʾān.

When citing prophetic traditions, Ibn Juzayy made use of the six canonical collections (kutub al-sittah) with the exception of Ibn Mājah (d. 272/886). Regarding narratives from the sīrah, he does not always specify his sources, often employing general expressions such as “fī al-siyar” or “fī kutub al-siyar.” His principal source in this area was most likely al-Suhaylī's (d. 581/1185) al-Rawḍ al-unuf, a widely read commentary on Sīrat Ibn Hishām in al-Andalus.

As a Mālikī jurist, Ibn Juzayy also referred to al-Muwaṭṭaʾ of Imām Mālik (d. 179/795), both for legal rulings and for aḥādīth, and to works on Qurʾānic jurisprudence such as that of Ibn al-ʿArabī (d. 543/1148). In theological matters, he largely followed the Ashʿarī school, occasionally drawing upon figures such as al-Juwaynī (d. 478/1085) and al-Bāqillānī (d. 403/1013).

== Editions ==
The tafsīr of Ibn Juzayy was first printed in Egypt in 1355/1936, across four volumes. This initial edition, however, contained numerous textual and typographical errors. Subsequent reprints, many of which appear to have been based on that same version, continued to reproduce these mistakes. Among the more widely circulated of these was the edition issued by Dār al-Kutub al-ʿIlmiyyah in 1415/1995.

In later years, Dār al-Ḍiyāʾ (Kuwait) published two critically edited versions prepared by Dr. Muḥammad ibn Sayyidī Muḥammad Mawlāy, the first in 1430/2009 and the second in 1434/2013, appearing in three and four volumes respectively. These editions represented significant improvements over earlier prints but were not entirely free from errors or omissions. While the second edition corrected issues found in its opening volume, the remaining three retained many of the inaccuracies present in the first release.

Another notable publication appeared in 1433/2012, when al-Muntadā al-Islāmī in Sharjah, United Arab Emirates produced a one-volume edition comprising 1,023 pages. Drawing upon five manuscripts, this version succeeded in eliminating most of the textual errors and omissions of prior prints. It features an accessible layout, presenting the Qurʾānic text at the top of each page with its corresponding commentary beneath. However, it provides no editorial annotations or explanatory notes on Ibn Juzayy’s text and omits tashkīl (vocalization marks) from the tafsīr portion.

== See also ==
- List of Sunni books
- List of tafsir works

== Sources ==
- Mehmet Bağış (2 March 2018). "İbn Cüzey'in et-Teshîl li 'Ulûmi't-Tenzîl Adlı Tefsîri'nin Mukaddimesinde Kur'ân İlimleri ve Tefsîr Usûlü Konuları". Şırnak Üniversitesi İlahiyat Fakültesi Dergisi. 9 (19). Şırnak University: 8–26.
- Abdullah A. Khan (July 2024). Imam Ibn Juzayy al-Kalbī and His Tafsīr: Al-Tashīl li ʿUlūm al-Tanzīl (PDF). Al-Ma'rifa Ulama Resource Centre. pp. 1–8.
- Āʾishah al-Sayyid Muḥammad al-Sayyid Ḥasan Ḥasan (September 2023). "A Foundational Exegetical Reading of Ibn Juzayy al-Kalbi's al-Tashīl (693–741 AH): The First Quarter of Sūrat al-Baqarah". Journal of the Faculty of Islamic and Arabic Studies for Girls in Alexandria. 39 (1). Al-Azhar university: 199–298. doi:10.21608/bfda.2023.319358.
