= Al-Bahr al-Muhit =

Classical Sunni tafsir of the Qur'an

- Author: Abu Hayyan al-Gharnati
- Language: Arabic
- Subject: Tafsir
- Publisher: Rissalah Alamiya
- Publication place: Al-Andalus
- ISBN: 9789933424343

Al-Bahr al-Muhit (Arabic: البحر المحيط, lit. 'The Deep/Wide Ocean'), is a classical Sunni commentary of the Qur'an, authored by the Andalusian Zahiri-Ash'ari scholar Abu Hayyan al-Gharnati. It is considered the most significant source on Quranic grammar (morphology and syntax), phrases, vocabulary, etymology, and recitation.

== Name ==
The book tafsir authored by Abū Hayyān was named al-Bahr al-Muhīt. The two terms that comprise the tafsir are al-Bahr and al-Muhīt. Al-Bahr, which means "ocean," is a phrase that's frequently used to describe the sea or someone who possesses noble and charitable qualities. Al-Muhīt, however, denotes both deep and wide. Consequently, al-Bahr al-Muhīt refers to a vast and deep ocean.

== Methodology ==
When the author was 57 years old in 1311 or 710 Hijri, this work was composed utilising the tafṣīlī method. Scholars have classified it as tafsīr bi al-ra'y al-mamdūh (reason-based interpretation), and its contents are guaranteed to be free of fabricated narrations and deviant beliefs.

Tafsīr al-Bahr al-Muhīt also includes Al-Tafsīr bi al-iqtirān. This is due to the fact that Abū Hayyān applied his in-depth knowledge of linguistic conventions and Ulūm al-Qur'an's methods like qira'at, narrations about the causes of nuzūl, nasikh mansūkh, and others—in addition to reason when interpreting verses in Tafsīr al-Bahr al-Muhīt. Tafsīr al-Bahr al-Muhīt's explanation technique can be categorised as the Muqārin method because it used concepts from his contemporary scientists and intellectuals to bolster his opinion while also comparing many views from previous interpreters. Tafsīr al-Bahr al-Muhīt uses the Tafsīlī/Itnābī methodology to explain each line in detail after first breaking it down. This method increases the scope of the explanation provided. Meanwhile, Tafsīr al-Bahr al-Muhīt uses the Tahlīlī approach to explain the meaning of the verses in a methodical manner, starting with Surah al-Fatiha and concluding with Surah al-Nas. Since Tafsīr al-Bahr al-Muhīt's dispute revolves around linguistic qualities, such as word construction, sentence structure, literature, and components of I'rāb and its reading harakat, it tends to lean towards lughawī/adabī.

== Description ==
As a mufassir (Quran exegete) who was a specialist in grammar, Abū Hayyān al-Andalusī's interpretation of the Qur'an is evidence of his proficiency in that domain. One of the fundamental principles of Abū Hayyān's interpretation of the Qur'an is that language is the most important element in understanding its contents. In addition, Abū Hayyān grounds his understanding and interpretation of the Qur'an on Usul al-qirā'āt. Abū Hayyān al-Andalusī sought to produce a commentary that synthesised various scholarly perspectives and attempted, via extensive linguistic study, to elucidate the meaning of a word (which he used as a source for his commentary). The title of the subsequent commentary book, al-Bahr al-Muhīt, which means "the deep ocean," seems to have been inspired by this. He strove to clarify difficult meanings, to reveal ideas that were still hidden and unclear, and to unravel difficult meanings.

Even though Abū Hayyān recognised qirā'āt shādhdhah as a source of disagreement, he also listed the following requirements for an interpreter: Lughah, or language science; grammar science, including nahwu (syntax) and saraf (morphology) science; bayan and badi' science, to know the Qur'anic language style; hadith science, to know the rationale behind nuzul and narrations that elucidate the meaning of words that are still mubham and mujmal; usūl al-fiqh science, to know the wording of the Qur'an, whether Mujmal, Mubayyan, 'Ām, Khās, Mutlaq, or Muqayyad; kalam science, to know about the obligatory attributes of Allah and the impossibility of Allah; and qirā’āt science, to know the various aspects of qirā’āt. This is due to the possibility that the distinction may have ramifications for meaning differences or may help to clarify how the phrase is to be understood.

== Background ==
Abū Hayyān relied on earlier academics’ tafsir volumes as well as other literature while writing his own:

- Al-Kashshaaf by al-Zamakhshari.
- Al-Muharrar al-Wajiz fi Tafsir al-Kitāb al-'Aziz by Ibn 'Atiyya.
- Al-Tahrīr wa al-Tahbīr li Aqwāl A'immah al-Tafsīr by Ibn al-Naqib.
- Al-Muhkam wa Muhīt al-A'zam by Ibn Sayyid, a reference in the field of language.

The text that is most frequently consulted while discussing grammar is al-Kitāb, authored by the renowned Persian scholar Abu Bishr Amr ibn 'Uthman ibn Qunbur Sibawaih. He was the one who first created the principles of grammar; he was born and raised in Basra. In addition, the writings of Abu Abdullah Muhammad ibn Malik al-Jayani are found in al-Mumni', a book translated from Damascus by Abu al-Hasan Ali ibn Mu'min ibn Usfur al-Hadrami al-Shabili. Abu Hayyan read these books through al-‘Allamah Abu Ja’far Ah}mad ibn Ibrahim ibn Zubair al-Thaqafi. The source for bayān and badī’ science used by Abū Hayyān is Minhāj al-Bulaghā’ wa Sirāj al-Udabā by Abū al-Hasan Hāzim ibn Muhammad Hāzim al-Andalusī al-Ansārī al-Qartājānī.

The texts used as references in the field of Hadīth also include Sahih al-Bukhari and Sahih Muslim, Sunan Abi Dawud, Sunan al-Tirmidhi, Sunan al-Nasa'i, Sunan Ibn Majah, and Musnad. Abū Hayyān mentions al-Mahsūl, a work by Abū 'Abdullāh MuHammad Ibn 'Umar al-Rāzī, in the context of ushul. In the field of Quranic recitation, Abū Hayyān draws on a wide range of sources. Mutawātirah and shādhdhah are abundant in qirā'āt. The best sources of qirā'āt sab'ah, according to him, are the two books of al-Iqnā by Abū Ja’far ibn Bādhis (491–540 H), which were published in two volumes by Dār al-Fikr Damascus in 1403 H, and taqīq by 'Abd al-Majīd Qattās (Badhish, n.d.). The work that serves as a source for the qirā'āt 'ashrah is the book al-Misbāh by Abū al-Karam al-Shahrazūrī. In addition, he took material from his book al-‘Aqd al-Lailī, also known as the string of pearls.

== See also ==
- List of tafsir works
- List of Sunni books

== Sources ==
Apriliantia, Anisatul Fikriyah; Hudab, M. Masrur (2024). "Abū Hayyān al-Andalusī's Thoughts on Qirā'āt Shādhdhah in The Tafsīr of al-Bahr al-Muhīt". PROGRESIVA: Jurnal Pemikiran Dan Pendidikan Islam. 13 (2). University of Sunan Giri Surabaya: 243–258. doi:10.22219/progresiva.v13i02.29885. ISSN 2226-6348.
