= Tafsir al-Basit =

Classical Sunni tafsir of the Qur'an

- Author: Al-Wahidi
- Language: Arabic
- Subject: Tafsir
- Publisher: Dar al-Musawsar al-Arabi
- Publication date: 2013
- Pages: 13941
- Followed by: Tafsir al-Wasit

Al-Tafsīr al-Basīṭ fī Tafsīr al-Kitāb al-ʿAzīz (Arabic: التفسير البسيط في تفسير الكتاب العزيز, lit. 'The Extensive Commentary in Explanation of the Noble Book'), commonly known as Al-Tafsir al-Basit (Arabic: التفسير الباسط, lit. 'The Extensive Commentary or The Detailed Commentary') is one of the earliest exhaustive classical Sunni Qur'anic interpretational works (tafsir) composed by the 11th century Islamic scholar, al-Wahidi. This is his largest and most comprehensive commentary consisting of 25 volumes.

This book is categorised as al-Tafsir al-Tahlili (analytical commentary). The reason is that Al-Wahidi thoroughly examines verse by verse, mufrad by mufrad, utilizing only grammar and language in general.

== Background ==
He began working on al-Basit; in his introduction to that work he makes clear that he began writing it early in his life and after Al-Tha'labi's death. In his colophon to al-Basit, he states that he began writing in the year of 427/1035 and he finished the work on 20 Rab'i 446/29 June 1054; the work thus took almost two decades to complete (nineteen years to be exact).

== Methodology ==
Al-Wāḥidī's Tafsīr al-Basīṭ is distinguished by its deep scientific richness, especially in the fields of Arabic linguistics, grammar, and philology. Al-Wāḥidī entered the domain of Qurʾānic exegesis with the conviction that the foundational pillars of tafsīr are mastery of the Arabic language, grammatical structure (naḥw), and rhetorical eloquence (balāgha). After attaining proficiency in these sciences, particularly through the traditions of the Basran and Kufan grammatical schools, he systematically harnessed them to serve the Qurʾānic text, analyzing the etymology of words, tracing their morphological roots, and providing extensive linguistic evidence for interpretive choices.

The result was a monumental tafsīr that functioned as an encyclopedic integration of Qurʾānic interpretation with the entire spectrum of Arabic linguistic sciences. As Walid A. Saleh notes, "al-Wāḥidī was the first exegete to attempt a systematic, philological reading of the Qurʾān that rejected the mere accumulation of transmitted reports." His work laid the groundwork for the sophisticated methodologies later employed by al-Zamakhsharī, who in many respects restructured al-Basīṭ's approach in his al-Kashshāf.

However, this intense focus on language occasionally led al-Wāḥidī into technical discussions so intricate that they were viewed by some as departures from tafsīr proper, venturing instead into the domain of pure grammar or literary theory. Yet, these excursions reflect his belief that linguistic mastery was inseparable from understanding divine revelation.

Because of its depth and density, Tafsīr al-Basīṭ is a work accessible only to scholars and advanced students well-versed in Arabic linguistics and jurisprudence. As al-Wāḥidī himself acknowledged, general readers may find the text impenetrable, comparing them to “one who seeks to unlock a door after losing the key.”

Despite its challenges, al-Basīṭ holds an elevated position in the Qurʾānic interpretive tradition, representing one of the earliest efforts to construct a systematic linguistically grounded exegesis. It remains an indispensable reference for specialists in tafsīr, philology, and the development of Qurʾānic sciences.

== Legacy ==
Tafsīr al-Basīṭ represents the first decisive departure from the traditional encyclopaedic model of tafsīr pioneered by al-Ṭabarī and later refined and popularised by al-Thaʿlabī. In this work, al-Wāḥidī offers the earliest structured response to a growing interpretive crisis in Qurʾānic exegesis by proposing a more rigorous, philologically grounded method. His tafsīr marks a deliberate shift toward analytical engagement with grammar, lexicon, and linguistic nuance, laying the foundation for a new era in Qurʾānic commentary. This methodological transformation deeply influenced later exegetes, particularly al-Zamakhsharī, whose al-Kashshāf is widely regarded as a reworking or development of al-Basīṭ's philological framework.

As part of the emerging Naysābūrī school of tafsīr, al-Wāḥidī alongside his teacher al-Thaʿlabī, sought to articulate a distinctly Ashʿarī theological vision, countering the rationalist interpretations of the Muʿtazila. They were among the earliest mufassirūn to incorporate kalām as a polemical tool within tafsīr, using it selectively to confront heterodox sects. This theological engagement was later expanded by Fakhr al-Dīn al-Rāzī, who drew directly from al-Basīṭ and carried the Ashʿarī legacy into more systematic philosophical discourse in his monumental Mafātīḥ al-Ghayb.

== Translation ==
- Al-Wahidi (2013). Aims, Methods and Contexts of Qur’ anic Exegesis (2nd/8th–9th/15th c.). Translated by Walid Saleh (1st ed.). Oxford, England: Oxford University Press. ISBN 9780199670642.

== See also ==
- Tafsir al-Wasit
- Tafsir al-Wajiz
- List of tafsir works
- List of Sunni books
