= Tafsir Ibn Atiyya =

Classical Sunni tafsir of the Qur'an

Al-Muharrar al-Wajiz
- Author: Ibn 'Atiyya
- Original title: Al-Jami' al-Muharrar al-Wajiz fi Tafsir al-Kitāb al-'Aziz
- Language: Arabic
- Subject: Tafsir
- Publisher: Dar al-Kutub, al-'Ilmiyyah, Beirut
- Publication date: 2011
- Publication place: Al-Andalus
- Pages: 3048
- ISBN: 978-2-7451-3211-6

Al-Muharrar al-Wajiz fi Tafsir al-Kitāb al-'Aziz (Arabic: المحرّر الوجيز في تفسير الكتاب العزيز, lit. 'The Compendious Record in the Interpretation of the Mighty Book') or shortly named al-Muharrar al-Wajiz (English: The Accurate and Brief Commentary), better known as Tafsir Ibn 'Atiyya (Arabic: تفسير ابن عطية), is a classical Sunni tafsir of the Qur'an, authored by the Maliki-Ash'ari scholar Ibn 'Atiyya (d. 541/1147).

It can be identified as the exegesis that amalgamates Tafsir bi al-Ma'thur (tradition-based interpretation) with Tafsir bi al-Ra'y (reason-based interpretation). But, generally, it is considered as Tafsir bi al-Ma'thur (interpretation based on traditions or reports).

== Methodology ==
Ibn 'Atiyya explains his methodology stating: “I move in this commentary according to the word order of every verse, explaining its ruling, grammatical position, linguistic function, meaning and pronunciation in different methods of recitation.”

In the opening pages Ibn 'Atiyya sets forth his purpose in coming out with a new commentary: to produce a comprehensive, yet concise work, dedicated to God, which would affirm the statements made by earlier scholars, as well as those made by al-Salaf al-Salih, and which would serve as a defense against the mulhidin (atheists, agnostics, heretics, the disbelievers in God), those who reject the Islamic message, and the adherents of esoteric doctrines (ahl al-'ilm al-batin).

The introduction to his Qur'an commentary was published by Arthur Jeffery (1954).

== Background ==
Ibn 'Atiyya relied on several earlier sources for his interpretation, including the following:

- Jami' al-Bayan fi Ta'wil al-Qur'an by Abu Ja'far Muhammad ibn Jarir al-Tabari (d. 310/923).
- Shifa' al-Sudur by Abu Bakr Muhammad ibn al-Hasan al-Naqqash (d. 351/962 ).
- Al-Hidaya ila Bulugh al-Nihaya by Makki ibn Abi Talib al-Qaysi (d. 437/1045).
- Al-Tahsil li-Fawa'id al-Tafsil by Abu al-'Abbas Ahmad b. 'Ammar al-Mahdawi (d. 430/1038).

== Reception ==
Ibn 'Atiyya's commentary was very influential on Qur'anic commentators in later generations. His influence is clearly evident in the works of al-Qurtubi (d. 671/1272–3), Abu Hayyan al-Gharnati (d. 745/1344), and 'Abd al-Rahman al-Tha'alibi (d. 875/1470).

Al-Muharrar al-Wajiz was highly acclaimed both in and outside of Spain. The book has been highly praised by Abu Hayyan al-Gharnati (d. 745/1344) and Ibn Khaldun (d. 808/1406).

The Qur'anic commentary by Ibn Atiyya is regarded as one of the greatest. It has received unambiguous appreciation from scholars of all stripes. Ibn Taymiyyah states: “Ibn Atiyya’s commentary is far better than that of Zamakhshari, and more accurate in its research and quotation. It is perhaps the most reliable of Qur’anic commentaries.” Ibn Khaldun characterises Ibn Atiyya's work as follows: "He compiled all Qur'anic commentary and made an effort to incorporate only the most precise." Abu Hayyan al-Gharnati deems his commentary equal to that of al-Zamakhshari, the author of Al-Kashshaaf while declaring Ibn 'Attiya's commentary to be more comprehensive.

Recent historians writing in the Arabic language, especially those from the Maghreb, have often chosen Ibn Atiyya's exegesis as representative of what may be called the “typical” Andalusian tafsir, and regard its somewhat contradictory title as a useful illustration of the major contribution made by its genre to the field of 'ilm al-Qur'an (Knowledge of the Qur'an with its meanings). According to this view each major Andalusian exegesis can be said to be muharrar, in that the approach used in discussing Qur'anic verses is comprehensive and not exclusively tied to a single method.

Claude Gilliot characterizes al-Muharrar as an abridgement of previous works.

== About the author ==
Ibn 'Atiyya was a major Qur'an commentator after the generation of al-Wahidi (d. 468/1076) and his tafsir work was a turning point in the history of the genre in Andalusia and North Africa.

He was a scholar of tafsir and fiqh from Granada, Al-Andalus (present-day Spain). He studied also Hadith, language and literature. He was appointed as the Qadi (judge) of Almeria during the reign of the Almoravid empire.

== See also ==
- List of tafsir works
- List of Sunni books
