= Tafsir al-Nisaburi =

Sunni–Sufi exegesis of the Qur'an by Nizam al-Din al-Nisaburi

Ghara'ib al-Qur'an
- Editor: Zakariyya 'Umayrat
- Author: Nizam al-Din al-Nisaburi
- Original title: Ghara'ib al-Qur'an wa Ragha'ib al-Furqan
- Language: Arabic
- Subject: Tafsir, Sufism, Kalam, Cosmology
- Publisher: Dar al-Kutub, al-'Ilmiyyah, Beirut
- Publication date: 1996
- Publication place: Khorasan (in Persian stands for 'Land of Sunrise')
- Pages: 3776
- ISBN: 978-2-7451-0603-2
- Followed by: Lub al-Ta'wil fi Tafsir al-Qur'an

Ghara'ib al-Qur'an wa Ragha'ib al-Furqan (Arabic: غرائب القرآن ورغائب الفرقان; lit. 'Wonders of the Qur'an and Desiderata of the Criterion') or, named in brief, Ghara'ib al-Qur'an (lit. 'Wonders of the Qur'an'), better known as Tafsir al-Nisaburi (Arabic: تفسير النيسابوري), is a classical Sunni–Sufi tafsir (exegesis) of the Qur'an, authored by the Shafi'i-Ash'ari scholar Nizam al-Din al-Nisaburi (died c. 730 AH; c. 1330 CE), who closely follows al-Fakhr al-Razi's tafsir in many places.

It was the first commentary of the Qur'an in Arabic written in India. A handwritten copy of this commentary is available in the Library of the tomb of Hadrat Peer Muhammad Shah Sahib in Ahmedabad.

This commentary took him about five years to finish.

== Background ==
Nizam al-Din al-Nisaburi relied on several earlier sources for his interpretation, including the following:

- Mafatih al-Ghayb by Fakhr al-Din al-Razi, died 606 AH (1210 CE).
- Al-Kashshaf by al-Zamakhshari, died 538 AH (1144 CE).
- Al-Wasīt fi Tafsir al-Qur'ān al-Majīd by al-Wahidi, died 468 AH (1075–1076 CE).

== Reception ==
According to Muhammad Husayn al-Dhahabi, the tafsir was praised by Muhammad Baqir al-Musawi al-Khawansari al-Isfahani (died 1313 AH; 1895 CE) in his book Rawdhat al-Jannat.

== About the author ==
He was a Persian mathematician, astronomer, Faqīh (jurist), Qur'an exegete, poet, and was generally regarded as a sage, that is, one attuned to philosophy and logic. He was born in Nisapur and was known as Nizam al-A'raj. The origin of his family and his clan is the city of Qom. After completing his education he came to India, settling there, most likely in Daulatabad. He wrote several books on philosophy, geography and sufism. He wrote another commentary of the Qur'an in one volume known as Lub al-Ta'wil fi Tafsir al-Qur'an. The exact year of his death is not known, but it was after 1329 CE. It is variably reported in available records as occurring in years from 710 AH to 728 AH.

== See also ==
- Tafsir al-Razi
- Tafsir al-Baydawi
- Tafsir al-Tabari
- Tafsir Ibn Ajiba
- List of tafsir works
- List of Sunni books
