= Tafsir al-Wajiz =

Classical Sunni Qur'anic interpretational work

Al-Wajīz fī Tafsīr al-Kitāb al-ʿAzīz (Arabic: الوجيز في تفسير الكتاب العزيز, lit. 'The Concise Commentary of the Noble Book'), commonly known as Al-Tafsir al-Wajiz (Arabic: التفسي الوجيز, lit. 'The Concise Commentary') is one of the earliest and first condensed classical Sunni Qur'anic interpretational works (tafsir) composed by the 11th century Islamic scholar, al-Wahidi. It is the smallest of al-Wahidi's three exegetical works, suppresses a category of texts that could be referred to as "pocket commentaries," or works that simply include the most essential explanatory of the Quran in order to fit in a small volume.

== Methodology ==
In Tafsir al-Wajiz, the verses are explained by the use of Hadith where applicable Hadith are accessible, rather than interpreting the Quran with the Quran itself whenever possible. He also incorporates the Sahaba and Tabi'in commentaries. He also uses linguistic skills to elucidate Quranic terms and talks about the causes of revelations. Presenting a monovalent interpretation of the Qur'an based on Ibn Abbas's traditions or those of others of his rank is the work's goal. It also attempts to provide a gloss for a challenging word that these early experts probably would not have been able to decipher.

Additionally, "al-Wajiz" was translated into Persian in the royal library, indicating that it was intended for a non-academic audience that lacked a thorough understanding of Classical Arabic. This book was written with the intention of providing a condensed and simplified exegesis that would be beneficial for all Muslims using simple language.

== Legacy ==
The first brief medieval commentary on the Quran is Al-Wajiz, which was specifically composed in answer to the public's desire for a convenient resource. Al-Wahidi was aware that he needed to write something fresh. Al-Ghazali's choice to emphasise the work's appropriate length further emphasises how few, if any, such comments exist. Al-Wahidi was therefore a pioneer. According to Walid Saleh on al-Wajiz: "Held sway for more than six centuries as the most accessible short commentary on the Qur'an, until the appearance of Tafsir al-Jalalayn in the 10th/16th century, which was itself based on al-Wajiz."

== See also ==
- Tafsir al-Basit
- Tafsir al-Wasit
- List of tafsir works
- List of Sunni books
