= Safwat al-Tafasir =

20th century tafsir by Muhammad Ali al-Sabuni

- Author: Muhammad Ali al-Sabuni
- Original title: صفوة التفاسير
- Language: Arabic
- Subject: Qur'anic exegesis (Tafsir)
- Genre: Islamic literature
- Published: 1400 Hijri (1980 CE)
- Publication place: Beirut (Lebanon)
- Media type: Print (hardcover)
- Pages: 3 volumes
- ISBN: 9789776354227

Safwat al-Tafasir (Arabic: صفوة التفاسير, lit. 'The Choicest of Exegeses') is a 20th-century work of Qur'an exegesis (Arabic: tafsir) by the scholar Muhammad Ali al-Sabuni. It is an interpretation of the verses of the Qur'an, explaining their meanings and implications, and what can be taken from them. Its author relied on the most important sources for interpreting the Holy Qur’an, taken from the most reliable books of interpretation of the early imams. It also mentions the sayings of the later ones. The book Safwat Al-Tafasir includes a summary of the sayings of the imams of interpretation, in a simple style that makes it easy for the learner and reader to understand, and clear and useful expressions. It is concerned with interpreting linguistic meanings, rhetorical styles, and what the verses contain of implications and rulings. He cites from several other tafsirs including Al-Tabari, Al-Kashshaf, Al-Qurtubi, Al-Alusi, Ibn Kathir, and al-Bahr al-Muhit by Abu Hayyan al-Gharnati.

He states in his introduction: "I have called my book Safwat al-Tafasir (The Choicest Selections from the Books of Qur'anic Exegesis) because it combines the best of the major detailed tafsirs in a brief, organized and clear fashion."

== Exegetical Methods ==
1. Explaining the overall meaning of the surah and clarifying the objectives that can be derived from it.
2. The connections between the previous verses and the verses that follow them.
3. Verbal analysis of vocabulary and explanation of linguistic derivations and examples from the Arabic language.
4. Mention the reason for the revelation of the verses.
5. Interpretation of the verses of the Qur’an.
6. Explaining the rhetorical methods (balaghah) in the Qur’anic verses and what they contain of metaphors and similes (majaz, kinayah, and isti'arah), and explaining them in a way that is easy to understand, and mentioning what is found of the rhetorical aspects, such as alliteration, antithesis, brevity, prolixity, and others.
7. Benefits that can be derived from the verses.
8. Subtle nuances (lata'if).

== See also ==
- List of Sunni books
