= Ibn Juzayy =

Andalusian Muslim jurist and exegete (c.1294–1340)

Imam Ibn Juzayy
- ابن جُزَيّ
- Title: Shaykh al-Islam; Al-Ḥāfiẓ

Personal life
- Born: 1294 Granada
- Died: 1340 (aged 45–46) Tarifa
- Cause of death: Killed in Battle of Tarifa
- Era: Middle Ages
- Region: Iberian Peninsula
- Main interest(s): Tafsir, Qira'at, Hadith, Islamic Jurisprudence, Islamic theology, Legal theory, Arabic, literature, Poetry
- Notable work(s): Al-Tashil li Ulum al-Tanzil; Al-Qawanin al-Fiqhiyyah; Taqrib al-Wuṣul 'ila Ilm al-Usul
- Occupation: Scholar, Mufassir, Reciter, Jurist, Traditionist, Theologian, Legal theoretician, litterateur, Poet

Religious life
- Religion: Islam
- Denomination: Sunni
- Jurisprudence: Maliki
- Creed: Ash'ari

Muslim leader
- Influenced by: Malik Ibn Anas Baqi ibn Makhlad Abu Hasan al-Ash'ari Ibn 'Atiyya
- Influenced: Ibn al-Khatib

Muḥammad ibn Aḥmad ibn ʿAbd Allāh ibn Yaḥyā ibn Yūsuf ibn ʿAbd al-Raḥmān ibn Juzayy al-Kalbī al-Gharnāṭī (Arabic: محمد بن أحمد بن عبد الله بن يحيى بن يوسف بن عبد الرحمن بن جُزَي الكلبي الغرناطي), better known as Ibn Juzayy (Arabic: ابن جُزَيّ) was an Andalusian Sunni Muslim scholar of Arab origin. He was a distinguished Maliki jurist, legal theoretician, Quran commentator, Quran reciter, hadith scholar, historian, scholar in Arabic, poet, preacher, orator, and a literary figure. He gained renown at a young age as a leading scholar of his time in al-Andalus, celebrated for both his classical writings and his martyrdom in the jihad against the Spanish Christian crusade. He was killed in the Battle of Tarifa in 1340.

== Lineage ==
Ibn Juzayy Al-Kalbi ancestry is originally from Yemen. He is a member of the Yemeni tribe called Kalb al-Quda'iyya, and his tribe Banu Kalb reached Andalusia in two ways: The first category was that of governors, which led Anbasa ibn Suhaym al-Kalbi to enter in 103 AH as a governor. The second category was that of the conquerors, which Abu al-Khatar Hussam bin Dirar Al-Kalbi entered in 125 AH. All these kinds belonged to a tribe called the Kalb, although Ibn Juzayy al-Kalbi's forefathers were among the conquerors. His grandfather, Sultan Abu Bakr Abdul Rahman Ibn Juzayy, was given the position of president and exclusive management of Jaén in the year 539 AH.

== Early life ==
=== Birth ===
Ibn Juzayy was born on Thursday, the ninth of Rabi' al-Thani, in the year 693 AH corresponding to March 15, 1294 CE, in the city of Granada, the capital of Andalusia at that time.

=== Education ===
Ibn Juzayy came from an illustrious family renown for their knowledge and piety. His father Ahmad Ibn Juzayy (d. 710 AH approximately) was a scholar and a reciter. It was through his family's influence that led him to crave for knowledge.

Ibn al-Khatib said: “He (may Allah have mercy upon him) was sincerely devoted to knowledge, studying, writing, and teaching, and he ventured into different areas of knowledge: Arabic language, Usool al-Fiqh, Quranic modes of recitation, Hadeeth, Arabic literature, and Tafseer. He memorized and comprehended the statements of the earlier scholars and studied many books and references.”

=== Teachers ===
His Famous Teachers are:

- Abu Jaʻfar ibn Az-Zubayr
- Abu Al-Hasan ibn Samʻoon
- Abu 'Abdullaah ibn Al-ʻImaad

He also narrated from:

- Abu 'Abdullaah ibn Abi ʻAamir ibn Rabi'
- Abu Al-Majd ibn Abi ʻAli ibn Abi Al-Ahwaz

== Scholarly life ==
Ibn Juzay's Sufic Exegesis, translated by Musa Furber

=== Career ===
After this stage, Ibn Juzayy devoted himself to teaching his students the Qur’an, the rules of its recitation, the readings with their narrations, and he taught them the Hadith, especially the six main Sunni Hadith collections (Kutub al-Sittah), including Muwatta Malik, the Arabic language, interpretation, legal theory and Maliki jurisprudence. He worked early on in writing and he mostly worked in issuing fatwas according to the Maliki school of thought. He was appointed as a preacher and led prayers in the Great Mosque in Granada, despite his young age; people commended his knowledge, righteousness and character.

=== Students ===
Many students graduated under him:

- Lisan al-Din Ibn al-Khatib (d. 776 AH),
- Muhammad bin Muhammad Al-Ansari, known as Ibn al-Khashab (d. 774 AH),
- Abu Abdullah Al-Shadid (d. after 776 AH),

And his three sons, they are:

- Abū ʿAbdallāh Muḥammad Ibn Juzayy (d. 757/1356), a katib under the Nasrid Sultan Abū l-Ḥajjāj Yūsuf, edited The Travels of Ibn Battuta by commission of the Marinid Sultan Abu Inan Faris
- And Abu Bakr Ahmed bin Muhammad Al-Qadi (d. 758 AH),
- And Abu Muhammad Abdullah bin Muhammad

== Death ==
On Jumada al-Awwal 9th, 741 AH corresponding to October 30, 1340 AD, Ibn Juzayy was killed in the Battle of Tarifa at the young age of 46, which took place in southern Andalusia between the Muslim army, consisting of an alliance of the Marinid Sultanate and the Emirate of Granada, and the Christian army, consisting of an alliance of the Kingdom of Castile and the Kingdom of Portugal. Ibn Juzay was participating with the Muslim army and he was the forefront in vocalizing jihad urging them to fight and stimulating their enthusiasm, but when the battle ended with the defeat of the Muslim armies, Ibn Juzayy was killed and died as martyr.

== Works ==
Ibn Juzayy was a multi-talented writer whose works demonstrate his depth of knowledge and virtue. He has written in a variety of fields, including the science of interpretation, recitation, Arabic, Hadith, history, fiqh, the principles of fiqh, the principles of religion, and a number of poems strewn throughout his works. Despite living a short life, his works have achieved prominence and still widely read till this day.

1. Al-Tashil li Ulum al-Tanzil ["Facilitation of the Sciences of Revelation"] — It's regarded as one of the best and most authentic interpretations of the Quran.
2. Al-Qawanin al-Fiqhiyyah ["The Laws of Jurisprudence"] — A comparative manual of the jurisprudence of the four Sunni madhhabs (Maliki, Hanafi, Shafi`i, Hanbali) with emphasis on the Maliki school and notices of the views of the Ẓāhirī school and others.
3. Taqrib al-Wuṣul 'ila Ilm al-Usul ["The Nearest of Paths to the Knowledge of the Fundamentals of Islamic Jurisprudence"] — A popular book on legal theory according to the Maliki school.
4. Wasilat al-Muslim fī Tahdhīb Ṣaḥīḥ Muslim ["The Muslim's Means to Refine Ṣaḥīḥ Muslim"] — A work on ḥadīth studies.
5. Al-Nūr al-Mubayyan fī Qawāʿid ʿAqāʾid al-Dīn ["The Clear Light on the Principles of Religious Beliefs"] — A treatise on Islamic creed and theology.
6. Al-Mukhtaṣar al-Bārīʿ fī Qirāʾat Nāfiʿ ["The Excellent Summary of Nāfiʿ's Recitation"] — A concise work on Qurʾānic recitation according to the reading of Nāfiʿ.
7. Uṣūl al-Qurrāʾ al-Sittah Ghayr Nāfiʿ ["The Principles of the Six Reciters Other than Nāfiʿ"] — Another work on the science of Qurʾānic recitations.
8. Al-Fawāʾid al-ʿĀmmah fī Laḥn al-ʿĀmmah ["General Benefits Regarding the Common People’s Speech Errors"] — A book on Arabic grammar and linguistic correctness.
9. Al-Daʿawāt wa al-Adhkār al-Mukharrajah min Ṣaḥīḥ al-Akhbār ["Supplications and Remembrances Derived from Authentic Reports"] — A compilation of authentic dua and adhkar.
10. Al-Jawāhir al-Ḥisān ["The Fine Jewels"]
11. Dictionary of Ibn Juzayy, a biographical collection.

== Family ==
He had three sons. His son Abu Abdullah Ibn Juzayy is mainly known as the writer to whom Ibn Battuta dictated an account of his travels. He wrote "The Travels of Ibn Battuta" (Riḥlat Ibn Baṭūṭah) in 1352-55.

== See also ==
- List of Ash'aris

== Bibliography ==
- Mohamed Fathy Mohamed Abdelgelil (3 January 2023). Biography of The Interpreter of The Qur'an in Andalusia The World of Qiraat Imam Ibn Juzayy Al-Kalbi. Sultan Sharif Ali Islamic University. pp. 16–23 – via ResearchGate.
- Ibn Juzayy, Muhammad ibn Ahmad, Tasfiyat al-qulub fi al-wusul ila hadrat 'Allam al-Ghuyub / li-Ibn Juzayy al-Gharnati; dirasat wa-tahqiq Munir al-Qadiri Bu Dashish; taqdim Ahmad al-Tawfiq. al-Tab'ah 1. [Casablanca : s.n.], 1998 ISBN 9981-1951-0-3
- M. Isabel Calero Secall, RULERS AND QĀDĪS: THEIR RELATIONSHIP DURING THE NASRID KINGDOM, in: Journal Islamic Law and Society, Volume 7, Number 2 / June, 2000
- Ibn al-Khatib, al-Ihata fi akhbar Gharnata, ed. M. Inan, 4 vols. (Cairo, 1973–77), I, 157-62;
- Ibn al-Khatib, al-Katiba al-kamina, ed. Ihsan Abbas,(Beirut, 1983), 138-43
- Ibn al-Khatib, al-Lamha al-badriyya fi l-dawla al-nasriyya, ed. Muhibb al-Din al-Khatib, 3rd ed. (Beirut, 1978), 116-18
- Al-Maqqari Nafh al-tib min ghusn al-Andalus al-ratib, ed. I. 'Abbas, Beirut, 1968, t. 8, pp. 40–54
- F.Velazquez Basanta, Retrato jatibiano de Abu Bakr Ya'far Ahmad ibn Yuzayy, otro poeta y qadi al-yama'a de Granada. Anales de la Universidad de Cadiz, IX-X (1992–93), 39-51
- Maria Arcas Campoy, Un tratado de derecho comparado: el Kitàb al-Qawànìn de Ibn Juzayy, pp. 49–57, In: Atti del XIII Congresso dell'Union Européenne d'Arabisants et d'Islamisants (Venezia 1986)he was the one who Ibn Battuta dedicated his life and works to.
