= Abd Allah ibn Abd al-Rahman ibn Aqil =

Arab grammarian and jurist

- Born: November 1294; Bālis, Syria
- Died: 18 November 1367 (aged 72–73)
- Other names: Ibn ʿAqīl
- Occupations: Grammarian, Jurist
- Known for: Shāfiʿī school in Mamlūk Egypt
- Notable work: Commentaries on the Tashīl and Alfiyya of Ibn Mālik

ʿAbd Allāh ibn ʿAbd al-Raḥmān ibn ʿAbd Allāh Bahāʾ al-Dīn al-Hāshimī ibn ʿAqīl al-Shāfiʿī al-Qurashī al-Bālisī (November 1294 – 18 November 1367), usually known as Ibn ʿAqīl, was a Syrian grammarian and jurist of the Shāfiʿī school active in Mamlūk Egypt.

Ibn ʿAqīl has entries in the biographical dictionaries of Ibn Ḥajar al-ʿAsqalānī, Ibn al-Qāḍī and al-Suyūṭī. There is conflicting information regard his birth year. It is usually placed in Muḥarram 694 AH, which corresponds to November 1294, but some sources give the year as 698 or 700. He was born in Bālis in Syria and in Cairo received an education in Arabic grammar under Abū Ḥayyān al-Gharnāṭī and in fiqh (jurisprudence) under ʿAlāʾ al-Dīn al-Qūnawī and Jalāl al-Dīn al-Qazwīnī. He was with Abū Ḥayyān for twelve years and was regarded as his favourite pupil.

Ibn ʿAqīl became the nāʾib (substitute) of the chief qāḍī (judge) ʿIzz al-Dīn Ibn Jamāʿa. After Ibn Jamāʿa dismissed him, he won the support of the Emir Ṣarghitmish. In 1355 or 1358, Ṣarghitmish dismissed Ibn Jamāʿa and appointed Ibn ʿAqīl chief qāḍī. After only eighty days, Ṣarghitmish was dismissed, followed by Ibn ʿAqīl, and Ibn Jamāʿa was reinstated. Ibn ʿAqīl left a legacy of 150,000 dirhams for the poor and students.

At the mosque of Ibn Ṭūlūn, Ibn ʿAqīl taught a single course on tafsīr (scriptural exegesis) that lasted 23 years. He died before completing it a second time. Among his surviving writings are commentaries on the Tashīl and Alfiyya of Ibn Mālik. His commentary on the grammar treatise Alfiyya was the most successful of many. It was heavily dependent on Abū Ḥayyān's preceding commentary. He wrote a major work on the issue of ikhtilāf, difference of opinion among legal experts, in which he found in favour of its legitimacy. It is known as Taysīr al-istiʿdād li-rutbat al-ijtihād or else as al-Taʾsīs li-madhhab Ibn Idrīs. Only part of it survives.

Ibn ʿAqīl lived luxuriously and was a poor businessman, but generous to a fault. He died in debt. His son-in-law was Sirāj al-Dīn al-Bulqīnī.

== Bibliography ==
- Brockelmann, Carl (2017). History of the Arabic Written Tradition. Vol. 2. Translated by Joep Lameer. Brill.
- Glazer, Sidney (1941). "The Alfiyya-Commentaries of Ibn ʿAqīl and Abū Ḥayyān". The Muslim World. 31 (4): 400–408. doi:10.1111/j.1478-1913.1941.tb00952.x.
- Schacht, Joseph (1971). "Ibn ʿAḳīl". In Lewis, B.; Ménage, V. L.; Pellat, Ch. & Schacht, J. (eds.). The Encyclopaedia of Islam, Second Edition. Volume III: H–Iram. Leiden: E. J. Brill. pp. 698–699. OCLC 495469525.
