= Rudi Paret =

German Arabic and Islamic studies scholar

Rudi Paret ( April 3, 1901 — January 31, 1983) was a German scholar of Arabic and Islamic studies.

== Biography ==
=== Early life and education ===
Rudi paret was born on April 3, 1901, in Wittendorf. He completed his secondary education at the Niedere Theologische Seminare of Schöntal and Urach in 1920 and matriculated at Tübingen in Christian theology. He soon transitioned to Semitic and Islamic studies and, at the age of twenty-three, earned his Doctor of Philosophy degree under the supervision of Enno Littmann in 1924.

=== Career ===
After conducting research in Egypt (1924–25), he became a dozent at Tübingen. In 1930, he moved to Heidelberg, advancing to junior professor in 1935. In 1941, he was appointed to a chair in Oriental Studies at Bonn. However, his career was interrupted by the war, and he spent much of the next five years in France, North Africa, and as an American prisoner of war. After returning to Bonn post-war, he accepted the chair of Arabic and Islamic studies at the University of Tübingen in 1951, holding the position until his retirement in 1968.

=== Personal life ===
In 1948, he married Hanna Kuppers, and they spent the next thirty-five years of his life together.

=== Death ===
Paret died on January 31, 1983, in his home in Tübingen.

== Selected works ==
- Der Einbruch der Araber in die Mittelmeerwelt (1949)
- Der Islam und das griechische Bildungsgut (1950)
- Mohammed und der Koran (1957)
- Symbolik des Islam (1958)
- Kommentar und Konkordanz (1971)
- Der Koran (1979)

== See also ==
- Walid Saleh

== Sources ==
- Graham, William A. (1983). "IN MEMORIAM RUDI PARET (1901–1983)". The Muslim World. 73 (2): 133–141. doi:10.1111/j.1478-1913.1983.tb03259.x. ISSN 0027-4909.
