= Tafsir al-Tha'labi =

Eleventh-century commentary on the Quran

- Author: Abu Ishaq al-Tha'labi
- Original title: Al-Kashf wa-al-bayan 'an afsir al-Qur'an
- Language: Arabic
- Subject: Quranic exegesis
- Publication place: Persia

Al-Kashf wa-l-bayān ʿan tafsīr al-Qurʾān (Arabic: الكشف والبيان عن تفسير القرآن, lit. 'The Unveiling and Elucidation in Quranic interpretation'), commonly known as the Tafsir al-Thalabi, is a classical Sunni tafsir, or commentary on the Quran, by eleventh-century Islamic scholar Abu Ishaq al-Tha'labi. The methodology employed by al-Tha'labi in his work can be categorized as an encyclopedic based exegesis.

== Methodology ==
Al-Kashf's significant contribution to the history of Quranic exegesis was made possible by a number of its characteristics. First, al-Thala'bi began by analysing the entire field and determining its key patterns rather than merely writing a new opinion. Al-Kashf's introduction marks a significant turning point in the evolution of the art of Quranic exegesis since it takes a self-reflective approach and provides a thorough analysis of the field at the time. Al-Thalabı's opinions of the leading experts in the field and the reasons behind his exclusion of some currents (namely, the Mutazilite tafsir tradition) are thoroughly disclosed to readers. He is also one of the few mediaeval exegetes who provided a detailed inventory of all his sources. In addition to his own notes from the lectures of more than 300 other experts he had studied with, he used more than a hundred books. Thus, his commentary's opening provides a clear evaluation of the field's state at the start of the fifth or eleventh century. His meticulous reference list was unmatched; instead of using just one edition of a certain book, he used all available recensions, including four different copies of the same work in one case. Researchers use al-Kashf in conjunction with al-Tabari's work to understand the early stage of Quranic exegesis because he gathered his material independently from al-Tabarı. Furthermore, al-Kashf maintains the collective interaction of Muslim scholars with the Quran up to the fifth century by integrating the information made available since the release of al-Tabarı's book. Al-Kashf is an essential source for the fourth century. Finally, subsequent exegetes, who were by that time less concerned with isnads, selected al-Tha'labi as the source for early material because he dropped the isnads without losing the content. For these exegetes, al-Kashf was a convenient and enticing source because it included the majority of al-Tabarı's content as well as additional information.

However, such an epochal work could scarcely be explained by a wealth of sources alone. Al-Kashf was significant because it provided solutions to a number of issues that the Sunni hermeneutical enterprise was experiencing. These solutions were flexible and persuasive due to their logical coherence. The entire spectrum of the mediaeval exegetical tradition reflects al-Tha'labi's reformulation of the trade of interpretation, which transformed the area to the extent that influence can be measured in a field where so many sources remain unedited. Al-Tha'labi used six main interpretive techniques to successfully resolve Sunnism's hermeneutical dead end. First, he resisted the need to break the connection between philology and Sunni hermeneutics. Second, he permitted all of the main developments in pietistic Sunnism to be accommodated by tafsir and, consequently, the Quran. Third, he incorporated a narrative interpretation style into the discipline of philology. Fourth, he made exegesis a clear political weapon against the non-Sunnı factions. Fifth, he fused the art of interpretation with the prophetic corpus of hadith. Last but certainly not least, he made tafsır a sophisticated discipline that took in and digested new intellectual challenges from beyond Sunnism, making them acceptable and popular. Tafsır as a discipline was transformed by al-Tha'labi.

== Features ==
Al-Tha'labi attempted to break the hermeneutical dead end of Sunnism with al-Kashf, a complete tafsir with six main interpretive techniques and more.

=== Philology ===
Being a philologist, Al-Tha'labi mainly draws on his knowledge in his commentary on the Quran's philological legacy in what he refers to as "Kutub al-Ma'ani", which approximately translates to "the books of the people of grammar and semantics." As a result, the commentary is jam-packed with linguistic and grammatical analysis as well as poetic citations (shawahid). Al-Tha'labi considered a pioneer provides a harmonization by integrating philological tradition into Sunni exegesis and showcasing its advantage for Sunni tradition.

Al-Tabari presented the two schools of interpretation—theological and philological—side by side in his seminal exegetical work, Jami al-Bayan, as though neither contradicted the other. Through the use of pseudo-philological techniques, al-Tha'labı was able to improve the Sunni exegetical enterprise's appearance and bring it closer to the rules of philology. The influence of the philologists and their new lexicons is evident in al-Kashf, which also acknowledged rhetoric as a new and emerging subject. More important was al-Tha'labı's readiness to reject any conventionally held interpretation that was obviously philologically flawed, provided that doing so did not necessitate a dogmatic retreat or alteration in the Sunnı worldview. Furthermore, poetry was permitted to occur in the context of Quranic exegesis in its literary form (adab), rather than just as a handmaid to philology. Poetry, the height of human creativity, was included in tafsır as a self-contained artistic manifestation as well as a technique. Together, these rulings gave mainstream Quranic exegesis a philological gravity that it had not had before.

=== Pietistic Sensibilities ===
If al-Thalabi's hermeneutics has a leitmotif, it is the Quran's declaration of its redemptive message. Every verse has the capacity to announce God's mercy and compassion for believers. Furthermore, al-Tha'labi was committed to making this distinction hermeneutically functional because, in his view, faith involved an ontological distinction between believers and the rest of humanity. The doctrine of Muhammad's intercession on behalf of his society, which he included into the interpretation of the Quran, further highlighted both of these aspects. Tafsir made it clear that a Muslim could be doomed for all eternity under any circumstances. In contrast, pietistic Sunnism elevated the reciting of the Quran to one of the highest expressions of devotion; the attitude was too powerful to be overcome, even though the hadith camp protested that the majority of the prophetic traditions supporting this perspective were false. Thus, al-Thalabi recounted these customs at the outset of his exegesis of each surah in the Quran. Here salvation was declared by mere reciting. Once unleashed, the all-encompassing salvific quality of reciting the Quran was uncontrollable, and reading passages of the Quran became just as effective as reading the entire text. What the traditions cited by al-Tha'labi were implying was that the Quran is, at once, an all-encompassing and a self-encompassing instrument of salvation, such that a part represents the whole and the whole is reducible to certain parts. The collective redemptive powers of the Quran are thus attainable by reading portions of it. This synecdochic aspect of the Quran can make sense only on the salvific plane: redemption comes complete to the believer (Saleh 2004: 103–8). The result of this view was to allow the Quran to compete with other forms of devotion that were being developed by the likes of the Sufis. Furthermore, al-Tha'labi ensured that the verses' content clearly affirms the najah (salvation) that awaits the devout. Al-Tha'labi went to great lengths to reveal this unexpected feature of the Quran. In this case, the exegete's ability to convince the Quran to support the main point Sunnism want it to make was paramount. There were two methods used to do this: positive and negative. The positive approach was to find salvific import in an otherwise harmless non-salvific verse. The negative approach was to limit the significance of harsh divine pronouncements about recalcitrant human nature to nonbelievers, thus making sure to distinguish believers ontologically from nonbelievers.

Al-Tha'labi also adapted tafsir to meet the admonishing sensibility and terminology of pietistic Sunnism. Al-Tha'labi therefore expanded upon patterns found in the Quran. Here, the goal was to turn the Quran's entire rhetoric into this kind of speech. Despite using the word "admonitory," I am actually discussing two complimentary rhetorical stratagems: one exhortatory and one admonitory, or what are known as tarhıb (instilling dread) and targhıb (instilling hope) in Islamic pietistic literature. Furthermore, an affirmation of the sharıa's rules was woven into these two rhetorical styles of interpretation: one is also persuaded and forced to carry out the duties set by God's law. This feature of al-Kashf had a significant role in its appeal. The work's blend of the ordinary voice of the pietistic tradition with the lofty philological tone is uncanny. One is currently reminded of the fleeting nature of life by reading a lengthy list of words collected by philologists regarding the phases of human existence. Al-Tha’labi primarily cited pietistic poetry in these admonishing parts.

=== Qira'at ===
Al-Tha'labi achieved sufficient proficiency in the field of Quranic variant readings to be granted the title of "muqriʾ" (reciter). Being a commentator did not automatically make one a reader (muqri), and ilm al-Qira'at, or the science of the alternative Quran readings, was a field unto itself. In fact, this component of the Quran is not covered in every Quranic commentary. Al-Tha'labi's commentary has been influenced by his proficiency with Quran readings. He names the authority of each word's potential variations and mentions them all methodically. Al-Tha'labi's prominence in this area was enough to get him a place in Ibn al-Jazari's dictionary, which is the most crucial resource for Quran readers.

=== Theology ===
Islamic theology, or at least a more overtly theological perspective, was incorporated into tafsir by Al-Tha'labi. He hardly ever missed a chance to explain how Sunnism interpreted a certain verse, how Sunnism viewed a particular doctrinal subject, or how others had misunderstood it. Mutazilite theology and, to a lesser extent, the Shi'ites were the enemy to be attacked. Al-Tha'labi never got weary of disparaging these groups, their ideologies, and their beliefs. Furthermore, al-Tha'labi was able to incorporate theology into tafir without using scholastic kalam as a vocabulary for his theological arguments. Despite being well-versed in Ilm al-Kalam, he revealed himself to be a smart cultural ideologue who was willing to simplify theological terminology for an audience that lacked the necessary knowledge.

=== Hadith ===
The core of al-Thalabi's hermeneutical endeavour is his integration of two essential elements of the Islamic religious traditions of the Middle Ages: the Quranic exegetical endeavour and the prophetic hadıth. In a way, the process of integrating the various facets of Islamic culture during the Middle Ages culminated in this merger. As it reached its first grand articulation in the commentary of al-Tabarı, the prophetic hadıth, an edifice that was almost finished in terms of both the creation of large compilations and the development of the science of hadith (ulum al-hadith), stood apart, in a sense, from Quranic exegesis. The two streams of mediaeval works were brought together by al-Thalabi, who also started what would become an ongoing link between them. The written and prophetic or oral revelations were brought back together, giving the hermeneutical event a structure that mirrored Muhammad's personality, the only person in whom both were once combined: the Quran (present as lemmas) and the Sunna (present as exegesis) combined into one. Through the prophetic sunna, the Quran became the embodiment of what will lead the Muslim nation, just as Muhammad was. Since tafsır was formulated as the embodiment of both divine and prophetic revelation, it had to take the place of Muhammad, who was to be the community's real caliph or successor. The Caliphate's failure on a religious level paved the way for Muhammad's successor to organise religious knowledge. Through textual fiat, the Sunnı society effectively had its immanent prophet in tafsır.

The first of the two concerns that need to be addressed is that al-Tha'labi's innovations were mostly implemented by citing prophetic hadıth. Invariably, a hadıth or prophetic tradition was used to interpret a verse in a way that offered believers redemption and declared God's mercy. For instance, as was previously mentioned, Q 93:7 was interpreted via the lens of a hadith. Furthermore, al-Tha'labi just needed to incorporate this tactic completely into his work because the admonitory rhetorical style was already well developed in hadith.

=== Narrative interpretation ===
A noteworthy aspect of al-Tha'labi's hermeneutics was his adaptation of established techniques to accommodate his audience's evolving preferences. His ability to transform narrative elements in tafsir into a cohesive, highly developed technique is the best example of this expertise. He accomplished this in two ways: first, he expanded on themes found in the Quran's narrative sections and transformed them into artistic productions. A recurrent story in the Quran is developed in one instance to encompass the story in question, providing a complete narrative of what would otherwise be a recurring story in the Quran. This technique is known as the grand narrative technique, according to Walid Saleh. The second was the micro narrative approach, which included explaining a specific verse using a narrative unit that was full in its contents and, more crucially, did not seem to have any link to the verse in question or exist in other settings.

To attain plausibility, the fictive storytelling method used a variety of techniques. Even though the rhetorical Arabic tradition did not allow such a reading, when necessary, the meaning of a phrase was accepted literally rather than figuratively, or the contrary was true—a figurative usage of a word was chosen and the literal was abandoned. To keep the story cohesive, ethnographic details, poetic citation, and in-depth dramatization—including conversation and monologues—were all used. Since the exegete was not subject to any stringent hermeneutical norms other than coherence, it should be evident that fictive narrative interpretation was an appealing exegetical technique.

=== Mysticism ===
Al-Tha'labi was a Sufi and incorporated mystic interpretations in his great work. In his preface, Al-Tha'labi tells us that he intended to incorporate the mystical level of interpretation into his commentary. It is evident that he read al-Sulami's work alongside the author and incorporated a significant amount of it into his own commentary. Al-Tha'labi's quotations from other mystics that appear to have been lost and are only found in his book are far more important to the history of mystical tafsir. A more in-depth analysis of the mystical quotations and their connection to al-Sulami's writings is necessary before a more definitive evaluation of this part of al-Kashf can be made. According to all available evidence, al-Tha'labi prefigured al-Qushayri's work by being the first to accept mystical interpretations into mainstream Sunni tafsir.

== Legacy ==
Al-Tha'labi (d. 427/1025) was arguably one of the most significant Quran exegetes in the Islamic world during the Middle Ages. Only recently has the legacy of his commentary on the Quran, al-Kashf wal-bayan a tafsır al-Quran, or "The Unveiling and Elucidation in Quranic Interpretation," began to be explored. The high classical style of Quranic commentary was introduced by al-Tha'labi's work, which continued to be the primary source for later exegetes for centuries.

Al-Baghawi's tafsir entitled Maʻālim at-Tanzīl is a summary of al-Tha'labi's tafsir. In it, al-Baghawi places more emphasis on Hadith and legal judgements while reducing the Israʼiliyyat narrations.

== Criticism ==
Al-Tha'labi was criticized by scholars for using Israʼiliyyat in his tafsir as well as for including fabricated hadiths. This included attacking al-Tha'labis credentials in the field of Hadith. The traditions regarding the virtues of reading specific chapters of the Quran—known as hadiths about "Fada'il al-Suwar" (virtues of the Suras)—were formerly rejected by hadith scholars as authentic. Any scholar who chose to convey these hadiths jeopardised his reputation among the other scholars since they were seen as being so unauthentic. Several of these hadiths were passed down by Al-Tha'labi. According to reports, Ibn al-Jawzi stated the following on al-Tha'labi: “There is nothing to criticise about this man's [knowledge] apart from his reprehensible act of incorporating [in his works] flimsy weak hadiths, especially the hadiths which he cites at the inception of his commentaries on each new surah [referring here to the fada'il al-suwar traditions].” It's crucial to note that Ibn al-Jawzi only identified one flaw in al-Tha'labi's scholarship, not trying to diminish his reputation.

Al-Tha'labi was not the only one to include this class of prophetic stories in his commentary. Although he was the first, he was by no means the only one. Therefore, we must presume that the stakes are more than just incorporating questionable prophetic traditions that everyone believed were innocuous. Even Ibn Kathir, the staunchest conservative, did not discount al-Tha'labi as an exegete despite his criticism of his familiarity with the prophetic tradition. He ascribed al-Tha'labi's encyclopedic style to the "fanatical material" that pervaded his texts. According to him, al-Tha'labi was only a man who passed along an enormous amount of information, which unavoidably resulted in a collection of hadith with differing degrees of veracity.

== Editions ==
- Tafsīr al-Ṭha'labī (in Arabic). Beirut: Dar Al-Kotob Al-Ilmiyah. 1035. ISBN 2-7451-4716-1. (single-volume edition)
- The Formation of the Classical Tafsīr Tradition: The Qur'an Commentary of Al-Thaʿlabī (d. 427/1035). Translated by Walid A. Saleh. Brill. 2003.

== See also ==
- List of Sunni books
- List of tafsir works

== Sources ==
- Saleh, Walid (2006). "Hermeneutics: al Thaʿlabī". In Rippin, Andrew; Mojaddedi, Jawid (eds.). The Wiley Blackwell Companion to the Qurʾān. Wiley-Blackwell. pp. 389–405. doi:10.1002/9781118964873.ch25. ISBN 9781405117524.
- Walid Saleh (2004). The Formation of the Classical Tafsīr Tradition - The Qurʾān Commentary of Al-Thaʿlabī (d. 427/1035). Brill. pp. 27–57. ISBN 9789047412564.
