= Tafsir al-Wasit =

Early Sunni Qur'anic interpretational work

Al-Wasīṭ fī Tafsīr al-Qurʾān al-Majīd (Arabic: الوسيط في تفسير القرآن المجيد, lit. 'The Intermediate Commentary on the Glorious Qurʾān'), commonly known as Al-Tafsir al-Wasit (Arabic: لتفسير الواسط, lit. 'The Intermediate Commentary') is one of the earliest classical Sunni Qur'anic interpretational works (tafsir) composed by the 11th century Islamic scholar, al-Wahidi. A moderate-sized commentary, balanced between scholarly depth and accessibility. This book is categorised as Musnad al-Tafsir (tradition-based interpretation). The reason is because he utilizes Hadith and statements from the early generation of Muslims for commentary.

== Background ==
This work, which al-Wahidi brought back into the fold of the classical technique and its catholic hermeneutical approach to the Qur'an, which his master al-Tha'labi had perfected, was conceived somewhere during the draughting of Tafsir al-Basit. This work is centred on the content that al-Basit rejected. At the end of al-Basit, al-Wahidi refers the reader to another Qur'an commentary that contains material that is not included in the current work. Therefore, al-Wahidi must have started working on al-Wasit before finishing al-Basit, gathering material that was excluded from al-Basit because it was considered non-philological.

Al-Wasit is thus a compilation of reconciliation. The title itself can be read as a pun, both as the "middle" and the "go-between." Yet one can argue that the reconciliation is half-hearted, or at least a botched attempt to correct a previous position; al-Wahidi simply relegated Musnad hadith material to this work, and thus made clear what he had left out of al-Basit. His refusal to follow the encyclopedic approach is itself a statement; his separation of different ways of doing tafsir in different works undermined the encyclopedic solution that the Sunni tradition particularly the practice of his teacher al-Tha'labi devised to save the coherency of the meaning of the Quran.

== Methodology ==
The editors of Tafsīr al-Wasīṭ summarize al-Wāḥidī’s exegetical method as follows:

“Al-Wasīṭ is considered a comprehensive work of tafsīr, built primarily upon transmitted reports (al-maʾthūr) from the Prophet Muḥammad (peace be upon him), his Companions, and the Followers (Tabi'un and Tabi' al-Tabi'in). Nevertheless, it is not devoid of interpretive reasoning (raʾy) and the insights of scholars of language and meaning, which al-Wāḥidī employed to clarify the verses of the Wise Reminder (the Qurʾān). One could say that this tafsīr blends between narration and rational inquiry. Al-Wāḥidī interprets the verses of the Qurʾān beginning with what is found in the Quran itself, then turning to the Sunnah, followed by the statements of the Companions and the Followers. He discusses the circumstances of revelation (Asbab al-Nuzul), clarifies the meanings of words by referring to the authorities in language and semantics, and addresses selected issues in jurisprudence and grammar.”

== Legacy ==
Throughout the Middle Ages, al-Wasit enjoyed widespread popularity and acceptance by Islamic scholarship.

== See also ==
- Tafsir al-Basit
- Tafsir al-Wajiz
- List of tafsir works
- List of Sunni books
