= Ibn 'Atiyya =

Andalusian jurist and Quran commentator

Imam Ibn 'Atiyya
- ابن عطية
- Title: Al-Ḥāfiẓ

Personal life
- Born: 1088 Granada
- Died: 1147 (aged 58–59) Lorca
- Era: Islamic golden age
- Region: Iberian Peninsula
- Main interest(s): Islamic jurisprudence, Hadith, Tafsir, Grammar, Linguistic, Poetry, Arab literature, Bibliography
- Notable work: Al-Muharrar al-Wajiz fi Tafsir al-Kitāb al-'Aziz
- Occupation: Scholar, mujahid, jurist, traditionist, mufassir, grammarian, linguist, poet, litterateur, bibliographer

Religious life
- Religion: Islam
- Denomination: Sunni
- Jurisprudence: Maliki
- Creed: Ash'ari

Muslim leader
- Influenced by: Malik ibn Anas Baqi ibn Makhlad Abu Hasan al-Ash'ari Al-Tabari Makki ibn Abi Talib al-Qaysi
- Influenced: Al-Qurtubi Abu Hayyan al-Gharnati Ibn Juzayy 'Abd al-Rahman al-Tha'alibi

Abu Muhammad Abd Al-Haqq ibn Ghalib ibn Abd Al-Rahman, better known as Ibn 'Atiyya (Arabic: ابن عطية; 541-481 AH/ 1088–1147 CE) was a Sunni Andalusian scholar of the 5th Islamic century. He was a prominent Maliki jurist, traditionist, grammarian, linguist, poet, litterateur, and a bibliographer. He was considered the foremost Quran commentator of his time. His fame largely derives from his highly celebrated commentary on the Quran entitled Tafsir Ibn Atiyya.

== Life ==
Ibn 'Atiyya was born in Granada, Islamic Spain, in 481 AH/1088 CE. He was raised in a family of scholars. His father was a well-known Hadith scholar and jurist who studied under numerous eminent scholars while travelling throughout the Muslim world's eastern regions. He then became a judge in Granada, demonstrating his great reputation as a scholar.

As a result, Ibn 'Atiyya thus grew up in a household visited by scholars who studied under his father. This inspired him to continue in his father's path, and before long he was learning under him and other scholars, getting regular support from the man who knew his son was highly intelligent. Ibn 'Atiyya was, in fact, an extremely conscientious student who enjoyed reading and was eager to learn in order to become well-versed in all fields. He felt that reading widely would help him comprehend the Qur'an, so he did not limit his studies to Islamic studies. Additionally, he visited all of the Andalus's centres and cities, where he met and learned from a great deal of scholars. As a result, he became a highly regarded scholar who was well known throughout the region. Later on, he rose to the position of judge in Murcia, where he was well known for his zeal for upholding the law. He was also a prominent teacher and this is further evidenced by the fact that a number of his students went on to become highly regarded scholars in their own right.

There was a lot of turbulence in Andalusia during this time, with Christendom's attempting to attack Muslim areas and occasionally succeeding. He enlisted in the army and engaged in combat with disbelievers on multiple occasions. In addition, he urged all Muslims in Andalusia to take on a firm stance, writing to kings and governors to remind them of their obligations to Islam and to support God's cause. He was at the forefront in advocating for unity and jihad. All of this guaranteed him a solid reputation as an accomplished scholar and devoted Muslim.

Even though Ibn Atiyyah was a famed scholar, there is disagreement on when exactly he died, even if all of the biographies agree on the year of his birth. He is so reported to have died in the small Spanish city of Lorca in the year of 541/1146 542/1147, and 545/1150, however the first may be the most accurate.

== Reception ==
Al-Dhahabi said in Siyar: “The scholarly Imam, the chief of the (Quran) commentators, was an Imam in jurisprudence, interpretation, and Arabic, strong in participation, intelligent, discerning, and aware of the sources of knowledge.”

Ibn Farhun said: “He was a jurist who knew interpretations, rulings, hadith, jurisprudence, grammar, language, and literature.”

== Works ==
Ibn 'Attiya left many valuable scientific works, the most important of which is his Al-Muharrar al-Wajiz fi Tafsir al-Kitāb al-'Aziz which scholars unanimously agree is the most rigorous, accurate, and comprehensive.

== See also ==
- List of Ash'aris
