= Muhammad Ali al-Sabuni =

Syrian Islamic scholar (1930–2021)

Sheikh Muhammad 'Ali al-Sabuni
- محمد علي الصابوني

Personal life
- Born: 1930 Aleppo, Syria
- Died: 19 March 2021 (aged 91) Yalova, Turkey
- Parent: Jamil al-Sabuni (father)
- Notable work: Safwat al-Tafasir
- Education: Al-Azhar University

Religious life
- Religion: Islam
- Movement: Maturidi
- Profession: Islamic Scholar; Writer

Muhammad 'Ali al-Sabuni (Arabic: محمد علي الصابوني, romanized: Muḥammad ʿAlī aṣ-Ṣābūnī) (1 January, 1930 – 19 March, 2021) was a prominent Syrian Hanafi scholar. He is probably best known for his Qur'anic exegesis entitled Safwat al-Tafasir (The Elite of Interpretations). He died at the age of 91 in Turkey's Yalova province.

== Works ==
Sabuni authored dozens of works in various sciences including:

- Ṣafwat al-Tafāsīr (Arabic: صفوة التفاسير, lit. 'The Choicest of Exegeses'), his most well-known work which condenses and presents conclusions from various classical Sunni Qur'anic exegeses.
- Al-Mawārīth fī al-Sharī‘ah al-Islāmiyyah fī Ḍaw’ al-Kitāb wa-l-Sunnah (Arabic: المواريث في الشريعة الإسلامية في ضوء الكتاب والسنة, lit. 'Inheritance in Islamic Law in Light of Scripture and Sunnah'), a juridical work on Islamic inheritance laws.
- Al-Zawāj al-Islāmī al-Mubakkir Sa‘ādah wa-Ḥaṣānah (Arabic: الزواج الإسلامي المبكر سعادة وحصانة, lit. 'Early Islamic Marriage: Felicity and Chastity'), a juridical work addressing contemporary concerns regarding marriage in an attempt to encourage adults to marry earlier.
- Al-Sunnah al-Nabawiyyah al-Muṭahharah Qism min al-Waḥy al-Ilāhī al-Munzal (Arabic: السنة النبوية المطهرة قسم من الوحي الإلهي المنزل, lit. 'The Pure Prophetic Sunnah is a Portion of Divine Revelation'), a polemical work addressing criticisms about the authority of the sunnah and hadith raised by hadith-skeptical modernists and Qur'anists.
- Al-Tibyān fī ‘Ulūm al-Qur’ān (Arabic: التبيان في علوم القرآن, lit. 'An Elucidation of the Qur'anic Sciences'), a collection of lecture notes on Qur'anic sciences covering topics such as the revelation, compilation, and exegetical tradition of the Qur'an.
- Āmantu bi-llāh (Arabic: آمنت بالله, lit. 'I Believe in God'), a creedal work presenting various proof texts in support of orthodox Sunni positions on Islamic eschatalogical theology.
- Rawā’i‘ al-Bayān fī Tafsīr Āyāt al-Aḥkām
- Sharḥ Riyāḍ al-Ṣāliḥīn (Arabic: شرح رياض الصالحين, lit. 'Commentary on the Gardens of the Righteous'), a commentary on the hadith work Riyad al-Salihin by al-Nawawi.
- Qabs min Nūr al-Qur’ān al-Karīm (Arabic: قبس من نور القرآن الكريم, lit. 'A Firebrand of Light from the Holy Qur'an')
- Mawsū‘at al-Fiqh al-Shar‘ī al-Muyassar (Arabic: موسوعة الفقه الشرعي الميسر, lit. 'A Simplified Encyclopedia of Islamic Jurisprudence')
- Tafsīr al-Wāḍiḥ al-Muyassar (Arabic: التفسير الواضح الميسر, lit. 'The Clear and Accessible Exegesis')
- Al-Mahdī al-Nabawī al-Ṣaḥīḥ fī Ṣalāt al-Tarāwīḥ (Arabic: المهدي النبوي الصحيح في صلاة التراويح, lit. 'The Correct Prophetic Guidance on Tarawih Prayers')
- Al-Nubuwwah wa-l-Anbiyā’ (Arabic: النبوة والأنبياء, lit. 'Prophethood and Prophets')
- Mawqif al-Sharī‘ah al-Gharrā’ min Nikāḥ al-Mut‘ah (Arabic: موقف الشريعة الغراء من نكاح المتعة, lit. 'The Resplendent Shariah's Stance on Temporary Marriage')
- Risālah fī Ḥukm al-Taṣwīr (Arabic: رسالة في حكم التصوير, lit. 'A Treatise on the Ruling on Photography')
- Al-Mahdī wa-Ashrāṭ al-Sā‘ah (Arabic: المهدي وأشراط الساعة, lit. 'The Mahdi and the Signs of the Hour')
- Al-Shubuhāt wa-l-Abāṭīl ḥawl Ta‘addud Zawjat al-Rasūl (Arabic: الشبهات والأباطيل حول تعدد زوجات الرسول, lit. 'Abstrusities and Calumnies around the Polygyny of the Messenger')
- Muktasar tafsir Ibn Kathir, (in Arabic: مختصر تفسير ابن كثير).
- From Treasures Of The Sunnah (In Arabic: من كنوز السنة).

== See also ==
- Wahbah al-Zuhayli
- Muhammad Sa'id Ramadan al-Buti
- List of Hanafis
- List of Ash'aris and Maturidis
