= Al-Wahidi =

Quranic exegete and literary critic in the medieval Islamic world

Imam Al-Wāḥidī الواحدي

Personal life
- Born: 1003 Nishapur
- Died: 1076 (aged 72–73) Nishapur
- Era: Islamic golden age
- Region: Khorasan
- Main interest(s): Tafsir, Arabic language, Arab literature, Poetry
- Notable work(s): Tafsir al-Basit; Tafsir al-Wasit; Tafsir al-Wajiz; Asbab al-Nuzul
- Occupation: Scholar, Mufassir, Grammarian, Linguist, Philologist, Rhetorician, Historian, Poet, Litterateur,

Religious life
- Religion: Islam
- Denomination: Sunni
- Jurisprudence: Shafi'i
- Creed: Ash'ari

Muslim leader
- Influenced by: Al-Shafi'i Abu Hasan al-Ash'ari Abu Ishaq al-Zajjaj Abu Ishaq al-Tha'labi Abu Uthman al-Sabuni
- Influenced: Al-Ghazali Abd al-Ghafir al-Farsi al-Zamakhshari Fakhr al-Din al-Razi Nizam al-Din al-Nisaburi Al-Suyuti

'Alī b. Aḥmad al-Wāḥidī al-Naysābūrī, who was better known as Al-Wāḥidī (Arabic: الواحدي; 1003–1076), was a prominent grammarian and philologist of the Classical Arabic and a Quran scholar who wrote several classical exegetical works. He is considered one of the leading Quranic exegete and literary critics of the medieval Islamic world. He composed three different-length commentaries: Tafsir al-Wajiz, a short exegesis intended for a wider audience, Tafsir al-Wasit, a medium-length exegesis, and Tafsir al-Basit, an extensive exegesis replete with grammatical and doctrinal justifications. All of these commentaries have endured because of their widespread popularity. But the most significant of the three is Tafsir al-Basīt, considered to be al-Wāhidī's magnum opus. His book Asbab al-Nuzul, which discusses the "occasions of revelation" of the Quran, has been the main source of his reputation up to this point. This book compiles all the customs that specify the revelation date or subject matter of a verse, and it was arguably the first to do so.

== Life ==
Historians are unsure as to when he was born, but they presume he may have been born around 1003 (393 in the Muslim calendar) in Nishapur during the Seljuk period.

Al-Wāḥidī is one of the few mediaeval thinkers whose body of knowledge about intellectual development has survived. In his preface to al-Basit, he lays out in great detail the course of his education, starting with lexicography, grammar, literature, and rhetoric—that is, the entirety of the Arabic philological heritage as it was refined by the fifth or sixth century. He studied the dictionary of Abu Mansur al-Azhari (d. 370/980), read most of the diwans of the Arabic poets, spent his early years with grammarians and rhetoricians, and never skipped a significant piece of poetry. It is clear that al-Wāḥidī's career was influenced by his prosody master, Ahmad b. Muhammad b. Abd Abdallah al-Arudi (who died after 416/1025). Four decades after al-Arudi's passing, in 462/1070, al-Wāḥidī continued to use notes from this master in his commentary on al-Mutanabbi's poetry. This commentary was greatly influenced by al-Arudi, who also encouraged al-Wāḥidī to study tafsir with Abu Ishaq al-Tha'labi. According to one incident, al-Arudi the prosody scholar once chastised al-Wahidi for spending too much time on poetry and pagan sciences and exhorted him “to devote himself to the study of exegesis of the Book of God.” He strongly recommended his student to study exegesis with “This man whom students from distant lands journey to seek out, while you neglect him despite the fact that he is a neighbour.” According to al-Wahidi, “this man” refers to “the teacher (al-Ustadh), and guide (al-Imam), Ahmad b. Muhammad b. Ibrahim al-Tha'labi.”

Al-Wahidi also tells us that he studied all of the main grammarians, including Inbah al-Ruwat by Ibn al-Qifti (d. 646/1248). According to al-Wāḥidī's account, Abu al-Hasan 'Ali b. Muhammad al-Quhunduzi was his grammar instructor. The fact that al-Wāḥidī uses the word "happiness" to describe this teacher shows how much he values and cares for him. Al-Wāḥidī also studied under travelling intellectuals who came through Nishapur, including the western Islamic teacher Abu al-Hasan Umran b. Musa al-Maghribi (d. 430/1038), who was a grammarian. He also studied Quranic readings in variants with some of the greatest scholars of the day. He traversed the eastern regions in pursuit of knowledge pertaining to the hadith. One of his notable hadith teachers was Abu Uthman al-Sabuni. This is corroborated by the anecdotes of numerous customs mentioned in his writings, where he consistently references the year and the place where he first heard a particular tradition. As such, they serve as a priceless resource for him while retracing his trips. Al-Wāḥidī studied exclusively with his most important teacher, al-Tha'labi for approximately 4146/1024 to 247/1035, as we can infer from the introduction to al-Basit. During this time, he read all of the tafsir literature in addition to the works of his master.

He taught for a period of time in Nishapur and he was highly revered in his time. He produced students and his most famous pupils include: al-Ghazali and Abd al-Ghafir al-Farsi. He died in 2nd of Jumada 468/January–February 1076, when he was 75 years old.

== Views ==
Al-Wāhidī presents himself as the heir to the most significant author of tafsir, Abu Ishaq al-Zajjaj (d. 311/923). Al-Zajjāj became a key figure in classical tafsīr because of al-Wāhidī's master, al-Tha'labi. However, because of al-Tha'labī's hermeneutical approach, Zajjāj was just one of many exegetes who filled his work. In contrast, the main focus of Wāhidī's work is Zajjāj's interpretations. Al-Tha'labī and al-Wāhidī were significantly responsible for Zajjāj's rise to prominence in the classical tradition. The Mu'tazilites were well known for employing philological interpretational methods in their Quranic commentaries, and this methodology was permeating the mainstream Sunni tafsīr tradition. It was not al-Zamakhshari's doing, nor was Zamakhsharī's accomplishment a reflection of the depth of this relationship; A significant cultural transfer of the philological heritage of Qur'anic interpretation into Sunnism was orchestrated by Al-Wāhidī. One of the most fascinating parts of the history of classical tafsīr is the mapping of this process. The Ahl al-Ma'ānī (People of Meaning), a new category of exegetical authority, would also be crucial to al-Wāhidī, giving them power beyond that of any previous exegetical school. The term "Ahlal-Ma'ānī" refers to any experts who use linguistic expertise alone to analyse the Qur'an.

Al-Wahidi believed he had an advantage over most, if not all, of the previous exegetes because of his philological training. Al-Basit's introduction makes it apparent that he thought that literature and grammar were the cornerstones and essential components of exegesis, and that the writings of earlier exegetes were deficient inasmuch as they had not been employed. In fact, he asserts that the early layer of tafsir itself needed to be explained in a number of ways in order to demonstrate how it was an explanation of the Quran. Furthermore, al-Wahidi is impatient with non-philological interpretations and chooses not to support or contradict them because they are not feasible nor defended by philology. Therefore, al-Wahidi asserts that the writings of his predecessors were merely an approximation of what the Quran said and not a complete explanation.

Muslim exegetes reacted to the rise of philology as an independent discipline by putting forward two key positions about the Qur'an. First, they argued that philological methods could reinforce Sunni interpretations of the Qur'an by offering linguistic support for theological and spiritual readings. Second, they asserted that the Qur'an possesses a miraculous linguistic quality known as iʿjāz, its unique inimitability. From this perspective, the Qur'an was treated as a foundational linguistic reference, studied alongside pre-Islamic poetry, which early philologists had traditionally used to illustrate the richness of the Arabic language. Over time, however, the Qur'an would surpass Jāhilī poetry as the primary source for grammatical and rhetorical examples in Arabic linguistic scholarship. Although some academic voices quietly questioned aspects of this theological framework, belief in the Qur'an's inimitability remained uncontested among all Muslim sects. One of the earliest exegetes to fully engage with philology while striving to uphold Sunni interpretive principles was al-Wāḥidī, who worked to preserve the coherence and integrity of Sunni Qur'anic interpretation in the face of evolving scholarly approaches.

Muslim exegetes also had to contend with the emergence of scholastic theology (kalam) and its integration into Sunnism’s framework. In response, these scholars incorporated elements of kalam and explicitly emphasized theology as a central part of their interpretive works. While their exegesis was always primarily theological, the distinct concepts and terminology of scholastic theology began to influence their interpretations more directly. This trend was initiated by al-Tha‘labi, who criticized both the Mu‘tazilites and Shi'ites, and was further advanced by al-Wāḥidī, who ensured theology became an integral element of his commentary al-Basit.

== Legacy ==
Al-Wāḥidī is considered a major pioneer in the field of Quranic studies and exegesis. The first exegete to articulate a typology of tafsir is al-Wahidi, whose three tafsir works are clearly categorised according on audience complexity. He categorises his writing based on its style, subject, and suitability for various reader classes. He wrote al-Wajiz for the laymen who need something simple to learn by heart, al-Wasit designed for medium level whose ignorance can be alleviated by a work that is neither too simple nor too sophisticated, and al-Basit, his masterpiece, for the scholars who can comprehend a very high level of discourse.

Abu Hamid al-Ghazali was asked why hasn't he written a book tafsir. He replied: “What our teacher al-Wāḥidī wrote suffices”. According to mediaeval biographers, the titles of al-Ghazali's well-known three works on fiqh were most likely taken from al-Wāḥidī's three Quranic commentaries.

== Works ==
This conclusion is supported by a brief examination of mediaeval exegetical literature, which demonstrates that al-Wāḥidī was a well-known writer and a highly esteemed exegete. His most famous works include:

1. Tafsir al-Basit ("The Large Commentary"), this is considered al-Wāḥidī's magnum opus and the pinnacle of Islamic exegetical scholarship.
2. Tafsir al-Wasit ("The Middle Commentary"), thought to have been conceived at some point during the composition of al Basit, this work signifies al-Wāḥidī's return to the traditional methodology and its comprehensive hermeneutical interpretation of the Quran, which his mentor al-Tha'labi had accomplished.
3. Tafsir al-Wajiz ("The Short Commentary"), the first brief commentary on the Quran in mediaeval times is called Al-Wajlz, and it was specifically prepared in answer to the need for a handy work for a wider audience.
4. Asbab al-Nuzul ("Occasions or circumstances of revelation")
5. Sharh Diwan al-Mutanabbi, considered the best commentary on poetry by Al-Mutanabbi
6. Al-Tahbir fi al-Asma' al-Husna
7. Al-Du'at ("The Supplications")
8. Al-Maghazi ("The Expeditions")
9. Al-Ighrab fi al-I'rab ("The Explanation of the Prophet")
10. Naf' al-Tahrif 'an al-Quran al-Sharif ("The Refutation of Distortion from the Noble Qur'an").

== See also ==
- List of Ash'aris

== Bibliography ==
- Walid Saleh (April–June 2006). "The Last of the Nishapuri School of Tafsīr: Al-Wāḥidī (d. 468/1076) and His Significance in the History of Qur'anic Exegesis". Journal of the American Oriental Society. 126 (4). American Oriental Society: 223–243. JSTOR 20064479.
- Al-Wahidi (2013). Aims, Methods and Contexts of Qur' anic Exegesis (2nd/8th–9th/15th c.). Translated by Walid Saleh. Oxford University Press. pp. 67–71. ISBN 9780199670642.
