= Abu Ishaq al-Tha'labi =

11th-century Persian Muslim scholar and exegete

Imam Abu Ishaq al-Tha'labi
- أَبُو إِسْحَاقَ الثَّعْلَبِيُّ

Personal life
- Born: Mid 10th century Nishapur
- Died: 427 AH (1035/1036 CE) Nishapur
- Era: Islamic golden age
- Region: Khorasan
- Notable work(s): Tafsir al-Tha'labi; Qisas al-Anbiya
- Occupation: Scholar, Mufassir, Traditionist, Qur'anic reciter, Linguist, Philologist, Historian, Litterateur

Religious life
- Religion: Islam
- Denomination: Sunni
- Jurisprudence: Shafi'i
- Creed: Ash'ari

Muslim leader
- Influenced by: Al-Shafi'i Al-Tabari Abu Hasan al-Ash'ari
- Influenced: Al-Wahidi Al-Baghawi

Abū Isḥāq Aḥmad ibn Muḥammad ibn Ibrāhīm al-Nīsābūrī al-Thaʿlabī (أبو اسحاق أحمد بن محمد بن ابراهيم الثعلبي; died November 1035), who was simply known as Al-Tha'labi (Arabic: الثعلبي), was an eleventh-century Sunni Muslim scholar of Persian origin. Al-Tha'labi was considered a leading Quranic exegete of the fifth/eleventh century who famously authored the classical exegesis Tafsir al-Tha'labi, and his Ara'is al-Majalis is perhaps the best and most frequently consulted example of the Islamic qisas al-anbiya genre. He was an expert Quranic reciter and reader (muqriʾ), traditionist, linguist, philologist, preacher, historian, litterateur, and theologian.

== Name ==
The word al-Tha'labi, most biographers stress, was a nickname laqab), and not a tribal name (nasab). This means that al-Tha'labi was of Persian descent and not a member of the Arab tribal groups that carries the name.

== Life ==
According to Tilman Nagel, al-Tha'labi was born in the city of Nishapur during the fifties of the fourth century (350).

Although there is little information available about al-Tha'labi's studies, he lived in Nishapur, a thriving city with a large number of educational institutions, and his knowledge of geography probably helped him. Al-Farsi claims that al-Tha'labi had numerous masters and was a guy with a vast grasp of Hadith. Al-Tha'labi's own admission that he had relevant material from over three hundred teachers supports this claim.

Al-Farsi claims that ten of al-Tha'labi's teachers—three of whom are the most well-known—were crucial to his academic success. The foremost expert of his era on Quranic variant readings was Ibn Mihran (d. 381/991). He would teach Al-Tha'labi the knowledge of qira'at. Abu Zakariya al-Harbi (d. 394/1003) was an adab scholar who was knowledgeable about Persian and Arabic mythology. He specialised in tales of the world's wonders and miracles. Ibn Habib (406/1015), a prominent scholar in Quranic interpretation and Quranic sciences of his day in Nishapur, was without a doubt the most significant of al-Tha'labi professors in the science of exegesis and the one who had the biggest impact on him. The biographers specifically emphasised al-Tha'labi's apprenticeship with Ibn Habib, attesting to the fact that he was Ibn Habib's most exceptional pupil.

Al-Tha'labi transmitted hadith in a reliable and sound manner. He cited Abu Bakr b. Muhran al-Muqri, Abu b. Hani, Abu Bakr al-Tarazi, and Abu Tahir [Muhammad b. al-Fadl] b. Khuzaymah. He also cited the works of academics from their generation, including [Abu Muhammad] al-Makhladi al-Khaffal, Abu Muhammad b. al-Rumi, Abu 'Abd Allah al-Nasri, Abu Zakariya al-Harbi, and Abu al-Hassan al-Hamadani al-Wasi. He had numerous masters and transmitted a significant amount of hadith.

Al-Tha'labi was a popular preacher who led and educated the masses in Nishapur. He was a famed scholar and students from far away region would risk their a journey in attending his lectures. All of al-Wahidi's biographers emphasise that he was al-Tha'labi's most exceptional pupil and that he learnt exegesis from him. The terminology used in al-Wahidi's autobiography makes clear how closely the two are related. Al-Wahidi was a distinguished academic in his own right with expertise in Quranic sciences, literary criticism, and interpretation. Three great commentaries on the Quran were left by him. As the person who transmitted his teacher's corpus, Al-Wahidi is significant.

Regarding al-Tha'labi's death date, there is nearly unanimous agreement. According to all biographers, he passed either in either November or December of 1035 C.E. or in the month of Muharram in 427 A.H. in Nishapur.

== Theological position ==
Al-Tha'labi, an Ash'ari Sunni adherent, was the first exegete to use kalam in a polemic against opposing sects. He was a resolute opponent of the Mu'tazili. When al-Tha'labi introduces his commentary on the Quran, he strongly chastises the followers of the Mu'tazili, referring to them as "a sect whose members are the people of religious innovations and of heresies." Then he says he was told to avoid them and their company. Lastly, he says that when it comes to religious understanding, one shouldn't consider them to be experts. The stance taken by al-Tha'labi towards the Mu'tazili is one of avoidance and censure.

== Sufism ==
Al-Tha'labi was a Sufi and a follower of the mystic path charted by the great master Junayd al-Baghdadi. In his works, al-Tha'labi quotes him and calls him "our master". Al-Tha'labi had strong mystic ties in Nishapur and was a companion of the mystic master al-Qushayri.

== Legacy ==
One of the most influential figures in the field of tafsir in Islamic history was Al-Tha'labi. Walid Saleh claims that al-Tha'labi "radically transformed and reshaped medieval Quranic commentary" and held greater influence than al-Tabari in "redirecting the course of the genre."

== Reception ==
His student al-Wahidi said:

Abū Isḥāq Aḥmad ibn Muḥammad ibn Ibrāhīm al-Thaʿlabī, may God have mercy on him. He was the best of scholars, nay their vast sea [of learning]; the star of the eminent scholars, nay their full moon' their adornment of the scholars, nay the pride. He was unique in the community, indeed the leader. He authored the Qur'an commentary entitled al-Kashf wa-al-bayan 'an tafsir al-Qur'an, a commentary carried by mounts across the land and by ships over the seas. The whole of the community, with its different sects, has unanimously acknowledged his eminence and recognized the brilliance of his works, which are incomparable. Those who have had the chance of meeting and studying with him recognize that he was matchless. As for those who have never seen him, it is enough for them to look into his works for them to infer that he was a vast sea and a deep abyss of learning. I have studied some 500 fascicles (juz) of his works with him, including his large Qur'an commentary, as well as his books entitled al-kamil fi 'ilm al-Qur'an and others.'

In Tabaqat al-Shafi'iyya al-Kubra of Volume 3 page 23 the appraisal of Thalabi is as follows:

Allamah Tha'labi was the greatest scholar of his time with regard to knowledge of the Quran and Imam of Ahl al-Sunnah, Abu al-Qasim al-Qushayri commented " I saw Allah in a dream, I was conversing with Him and vice versa, during our conversation, Allah said ' a pious man is coming, I looked and Ahmad bin Tha'labi was coming towards us."

== Works ==
According to al-Farisi that Al-Tha'labi wrote many works that were famous but only two surviving and three others surviving by title.

1. Al-Kashf wa-al-bayan 'an afsir al-Qur'an ("The unveiling and Elucidation in Quranic interpretation"), better known as Tafsir al-Tha'labi is his Magnum Opus and one of the most renown commentaries of the Quran.
2. ʿArāʾis al-madjālis fī ḳiṣaṣ al-anbiyāʾ ("brides of the sessions in tales of the prophets"), a book on the stories of the prophets. The latter has been characterised as 'a work of popular imagination designed for education and entertainment. Organised according to the historical sequence of the prophets, many of the accounts are elaborations from the same sources used by al-Ṭabarī ... It has become the standard source of Islamic prophet stories, alongside the work of al-Kisāʾī'.
3. Al-Kamil fi 'ilm al-Quran ("The Complete in Quranic sciences"). This is a lost work mentioned by al-Qahidi, it's a work that deals in the field of Quranic sciences.
4. Rabi' al-Mudhakhirin ("The Spring of the Admonishers"), a famous lost work that was available in the medieval times.
5. Kitab yudkhar fih qala al-Qur'an ("A Book Which mentions the People Killed by the Qur'an")

=== Editions and translations ===
- al-Thaʻlabī, Qiṣaṣ al-anbiyā' (Cairo, 1954)
- Abū Isḥāq Aḥmad ibn Muḥammad ibn Ibrāhīm al-Thaʻlabī, Lives of the Prophets, trans. by W. M. Brinner, Studies in Arabic Literature, 23 (Leiden: Brill, 2002), ISBN 9004125892, ISBN 9789004125896

== See also ==
- List of Ash'aris
- List of Muslim theologians
- List of Islamic scholars

== Bibliography ==
- Walid Saleh (2004). The Formation of the Classical Tafsīr Tradition - The Qurʾān Commentary of Al-Thaʿlabī (d. 427/1035). Brill. p. 27-57. ISBN 9789047412564.
