= Nizam al-Din al-Nisaburi =

Persian mathematician and astronomer

Nizam al-Din Hasan al-Nisaburi
- نظام الدین حسن نیشاپوری
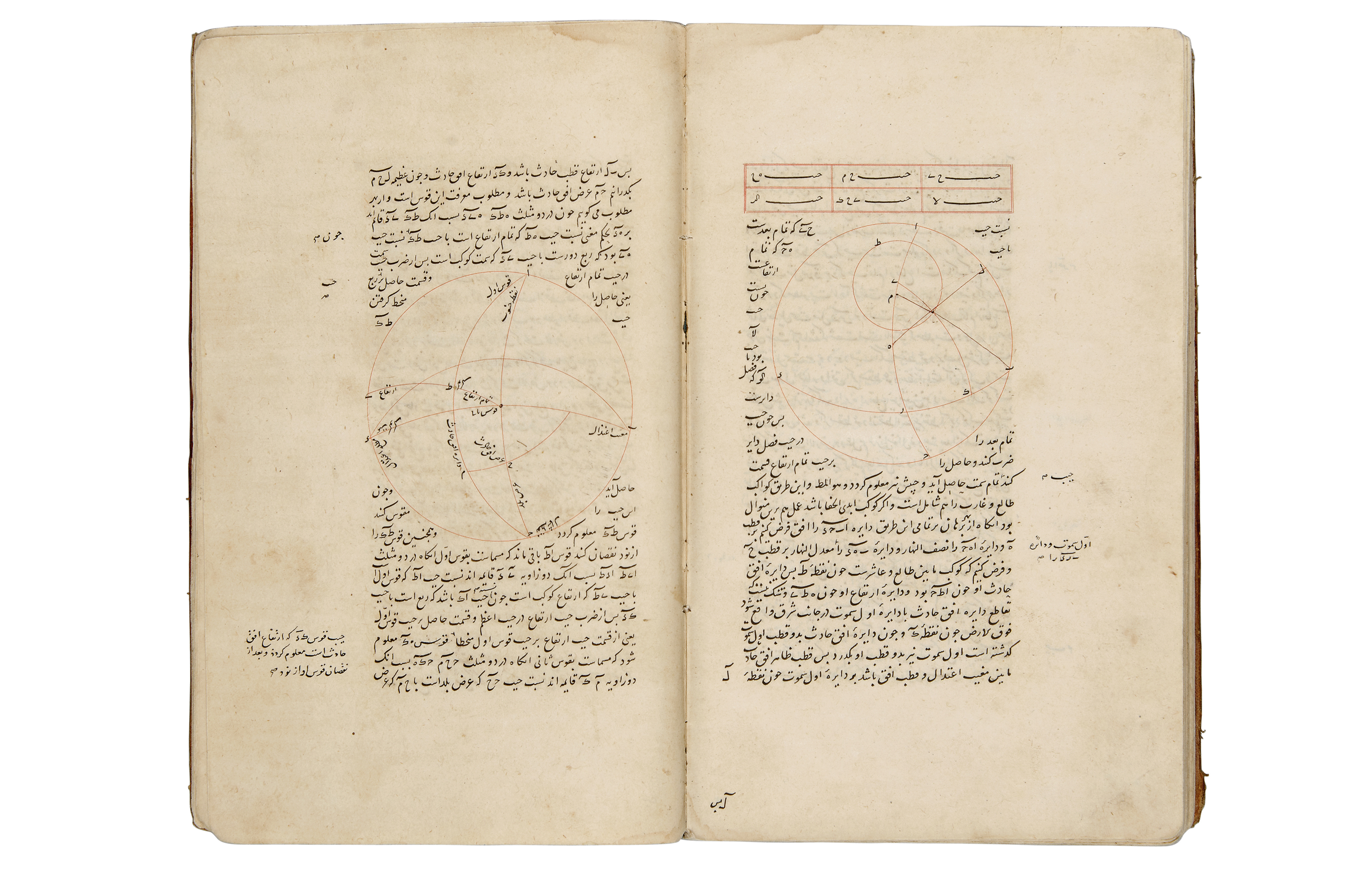
- A manuscript copy of al-Nishaburi's Kashf Haqa'iq Zij Ilkhani, written created in Timurid Iran in 1432
- Died: 1328/29

Academic work
- Era: Islamic Golden Age
- Main interests: Islamic Shafi'i, Ash'ari scholar, mathematics, astronomy, Qur'an exegete, poetry

Nizam al-Din Hasan al-Nisaburi, whose full name was Nizam al-Din Hasan ibn Mohammad ibn Hossein Qumi Nishapuri (d. 1328/29) (Persian: نظام الدین حسن نیشاپوری) was a Persian Sunni Islamic Shafi'i, Ash'ari scholar, mathematician, astronomer, jurist, Qur'an exegete, and poet.

== Family and education ==
Nizam al-Din Hasan al-Nisaburi, who according to genealogical information provided in his full name—Nizam al-Din Hasan ibn Mohammad ibn Hossein Qumi Nishapuri—had a grandfather from the city of Qom, was born in Nishapur.

Little is known about Nīsābūrī's early life and education. His early education was in the city of Nishapur, but he later moved to Tabriz, the capital of Il-Khanids at the time.

Nīsābūrī studied under and worked with Qutb al-Din al-Shirazi, who was himself a student of Nasir al-Din Tusi. He was one of the great scientists of Maragheh observatory.

In 1304, Nīsābūrī arrived in Azerbaijan; by 1306 he was in Tabrīz, the largest city in Azerbaijan.

Nīsābūrī died in 1329/1330, the year he completed his Gharāʾib.

== Works ==
=== Astronomy and mathematics ===
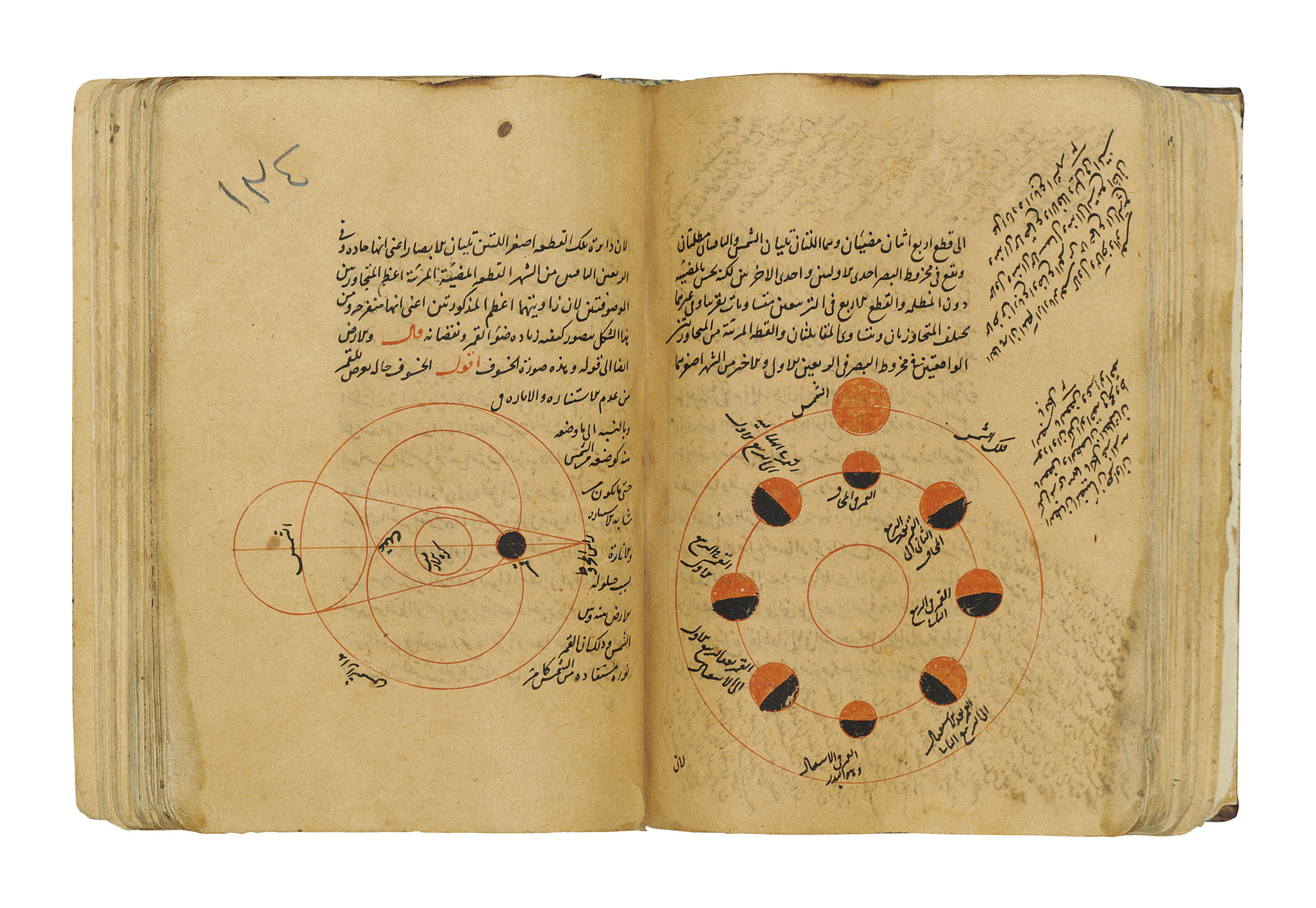
Manuscript of al-Nishaburi's commentary on Nasir al-Din Tusi's Fi 'ilm al-Hay'a. Copy created in Timurid Iran, dated December 1490

Nīsābūrī started to write Sharḥ Taḥrīr al‐Majisṭī (تفسیر التحریر, "Commentary on the recension of the Almagest") in 1303., a commentary on a work by Nasir al-Din al-Tusi. Together with an explanation al-Tusi's text, Nīsābūrī added his own results and ideas. He included data about the obliquity of the ecliptic and discussed the possibility that the transits of Venus and Mercury across the Sun had been seen.

Nīsābūrī second astronomical work, Kashf‐i ḥaqāʾiq‐i Zīj‐i Īlkhānī ("Uncovering the Truths of the Īlkhānid Astronomical Handbook") was completed in 1308/1309. A commentary on a zīj by Ṭūsī', it focused upon topics discussed in the Sharḥ, such as the positions of the planets in the night sky.

Tawḍīḥ al‐Tadhkira ((توضیح الذکر), "Elucidation of the Tadhkira") was a commentary on Ṭūsī's al‐Tadhkira fī ʿilm al‐hayʾa ("Memento on Astronomy") that investigated topics that included alternatives to Ptolemy's model of the cosmos, and ideas to explain that accounted the known variations in the obliquity of the ecliptic.

The Sharḥ and the Tawḍīḥ were not written for astronomers, but for students whose curriculum included astronomy.

Nisaburi also wrote a treatise on mathematics.

=== Religious works ===
Nīsābūrī's most famous work is his Ghara'ib al-Qur'an wa Ragha'ib al-Furqan (تفسير النيسابوري, "A Commentary on the Wonders of Quran in Exegesis"), also known as Tafsir al-Nisaburi). It is tafsir of the Qur'an, which closely follows al-Fakhr al-Razi's tafsir in many places. The work was written to demonstrate the importance of science for religious scholars. The work reflects Nīsābūrī's scientific background, in contrast with Rāzī's bias towards the theologians.

Nīsābūrī's other religious works include:

- Owqaf al-Quran (اوقاف القران);
- Kashf-i Haqayeq-i Zij-i ilkhani (کشف حقایق زیج ایلخانی, "Explanation of the Facts"), an explanation of Zij-i Ilkhani by Nasir al-Din Tusi, written in Persian
- Al-Basaer fi mukhtasar tanqih al-Manazer (البصائر فی مختصر تنقیح المناظر), a work on the topics in al-Manazer by Ibn Haytham;
- Sharh on al-Shafia by Ibn Hajib (شرح نظام بر الشافیه);

== See also ==
- Fakhr al-Din al-Razi
- Shams al-Din al-Samarqandi

== Sources ==
- Bosworth, Clifford Edmund; Asimov, M. S., eds. (1992). History of Civilizations of Central Asia. Vol. 4, part 2. Motilal Banarsidass Publishing House. ISBN 978-81208-1-596-4.
- Al-Dhahabi, Muhammad Husayn (1997). التفسير والمفسرون [Al-Tafsir wa al-Mufassirun (Interpretation and interpreters)] (in Arabic). Vol. 1. Cairo: Maktabat Wahbah. pp. 231–236.
- Morrison, Robert (2007). "Nīsābūrī: al‐Ḥasan ibn Muḥammad ibn al‐Ḥusayn Niẓām al‐Dīn al‐Aʿraj al‐Nīsābūrī". In Thomas Hockey; et al. (eds.). The Biographical Encyclopedia of Astronomers. New York: Springer. p. 837. ISBN 9780387310220. (PDF version)
