= Lucien Bouvat =

French Orientalist and Islamic scholar

Bouvat, Lucien
- Born: 1872
- Died: 1942

Lucien Bouvat (1872–1942) was a French orientalist and Islamic scholar. He researched various Islamic dynasties and communities, including the Timurid dynasty, the Barmakid family, and the Ahmadiyya religious community of Qadian.

He was a librarian of the Société Asiatique and in 1906, he worked on the magazine Revue du monde musulman in the (future) French protectorate in Morocco, published by the Mission Scientifique du Mar, which was founded in 1904 by Alfred Le Chatelier (1855–1929), Professor at the Collège de France.

== Works (selection) ==
His best known work is a History of the second phase of the Mongol Empire published by Eugène Cavaignac (1876–1969) in the world history series Histoire du Monde, which treats the Central Asian ruler Timur (also called 'Timur Lank', or ‘Tamerlane’), of the Timurids (1405–1502, his successors: Shah-Rukh, Ulugh Beg, etc., to the "Bataille de Chourour"), Baber and the Indian Mongol dynasty (1526–1857) and the rulers of Khwarezmian: the Khans of Khiva (until 1920).

=== Essays ===
- "Une grammaire turque du huitième siècle de l'hégire. La pénétration dans la langue of the turcs d'Abou Ḥayyān al-Gharnaṭî". Langues Musulmans (Arab, Persan et Turc). 3 (Leroux ed.). Paris: Actes du XIVe Congrès International des Orientalistes. 1906.
- "L'évolution modern of the langues musulmanes". Revue du monde musulman. 10 (1). 1910. ISSN 0750-7631..
- "Essai sur la civilization timouride". Journal Asiatique (4/6): 193–299. 1926. ISSN 0021-762X..
- "Les Ahmadiyya de Qadian". Journal Asiatique. 2: 159–181. 1928. ISSN 0021-762X..
- "Sur quelques manuscrits de la Société Asiatique relatifs à l'Espagne". Revue Hispanique. 15. 1906. ISSN 2116-3332..
- "Notice bio-bibliographique sur Athîr ad-Din Mohammad ibn Yoûsouf Aboû Hayyan al-Gharnati". Revue Hispanique. 10. 1903. ISSN 2116-3332.
- "La poésie persane". France et Monde (140/141, Supplement).
- "Le prince Caetani et son œuvre". Revue du monde musulman. 16: 53–89. 1914. ISSN 0750-7631.
- "Martin Hartmann". Revue du monde musulman. 12: 530–531. 1910. ISSN 0750-7631.
- "Un Commentaire Chinois du Coran". Revue du Monde Musulman. 8 (4): 430–547. 1908. ISSN 0750-7631.(together with Fernand Farjenel).

=== Monographs ===
- Notice of the travaux et publications de Lucien Bouvat. Arrault, Tours 1908.
- Les Barmécides d'après les historiens arabes et persans. Éditions Leroux, Paris 1912.
- L'Empire Mongol (2nd phase). Timour et ses successeurs; Les Souverains du Khârezm. 1336–1857; Les Souverains du Khârezm. (Khans de Khiva) 1502–1920. Boccard, Paris 1927.
- L'art musulman. Paris 1905 (a bibliography, together with Yves Rioche and A. Ronflard).

=== Translations ===
- Mirza Feth-Ali Achonzade: Monsieur Jourdan, le botaniste parisien, dans le Karabagh, et le derviche Mèst Alî Châh, célèbre magicien. Comédie en 4 actes. Éditions Leroux, Paris 1906.
- Mirza Feth-Ali Achonzade: L'Aventure de l'homme avare. Comedie en 5 actes (Deux comedies turques). Imprimerie Nationale, Paris 1904.
- Mirza Feth-Ali Achonzade: Histoire de Yoûsouf Châh. nouvelle historique. Paris 1903 Wikimedia Commons has a file available.

=== Literature ===
- "Jean Deny: Lucien Bouvat, bibliothécaire de la société asiatique (1872–1942). Notice nécrologique". Journal Asiatique. 11: 267–269. 1954. ISSN 0021-762X.
