= Abu Hayyan al-Gharnati =

Arab grammarian, Quran exegete and Quran reciter

Imam Abu Hayyan al-Gharnati
- أبو حيان الغرناطي
- Title: Amir al-Mu'minin fī al-Nahw; Sibawayh of the century Shaykh al-Qurrāʼ; Lisan al-Arab; Athir al-Din; Al-Ḥāfiẓ

Personal life
- Born: 1256 / 654 AH Jaén and Granada, Al-Andalus
- Died: 1344 (aged 87–88) / 745 AH Cairo, Mamluk Sultanate
- Era: Islamic Golden Age
- Region: al-Andalus
- Main interest(s): Tafsīr, Arabic, Qira'at,
- Notable work: Al-Bahr al-Muhit
- Occupation: Scholar, Mufassir, Grammarian, Reciter, Jurist, Traditionist, Historian, Poet

Religious life
- Religion: Islam
- Denomination: Sunni
- Jurisprudence: Zahiri
- Creed: Ash'ari

Muslim leader
- Influenced by: Dawud al-Zahiri Abu Hasan al-Ash'ari Ibn Maḍāʾ Ibn Al-Nafis Ibn Daqiq al-'Id al-Dimyati
- Influenced: Taqi al-Din al-Subki Jamal al-Din al-Isnawi Ibn Aqil Al-Safadi Ibn Hisham al-Ansari Siraj al-Din al-Bulqini Taj al-Din al-Subki
- Arabic name
- Personal (Ism): Muḥammad محمد
- Patronymic (Nasab): ibn Yūsuf bin ‘Alī ibn Yūsuf ibn Hayyān an-Nifzī al-Barbarī بن يوسف بن علي بن يوسف بن حيان
- Teknonymic (Kunya): Abū Ḥayyān أبو حيان
- Epithet (Laqab): Athīr al-Dīn أثير الدين
- Toponymic (Nisba): al-Gharānaṭī; Al-Andalusi; al-Jayyāni

Abū Ḥayyān Athīr ad-Dīn al-Gharnāṭī (Arabic: أَبُو حَيَّان أَثِير ٱلدِّين ٱلْغَرْنَاطِيّ, November 1256 – July 1344 CE / 654 - 745 AH), whose full name is Muḥammad ibn Yūsuf bin ‘Alī ibn Yūsuf ibn Hayyān (Arabic: مُحَمَّد ٱبْن يُوسُف ٱبْن عَلِيّ ٱبْن يُوسُف ٱبْن حَيَّان), better known as Abū Ḥayyān al-Gharnati (Arabic: أبو حيان الغرناطي, was an Andalusian Sunni Islam scholar. He was the leading commentator on the Quran and foremost Arabic grammarian of his era. He was also regarded as the best scholar on Quranic recitation of his time. In addition, he was recognized for his scholarship in Islamic jurisprudence, hadith, and history.

His magnum opus, Al-Bahr al-Muhit (Explanation of the Ocean) is the most important reference on Qur'anic expressions and the issues of grammar, vocabulary, etymology, recitation, and the transcriber-copyists of the Qur'an. Quite exceptionally for a linguist of Arabic of his day was his strong interest in non-Arabic languages. He wrote several works of comparative linguistics for Arabic speakers, and gives extensive comparative grammatical analysis and explanation.

== Early life ==
=== Birth ===
He was born in Spain in November 1256 to a family of Berber origins, from the Berber tribe of Nifza. Historians variously cite Gharnati's place of birth as both Jaén and Granada; his appellation "Gharnati" derives from this latter. At the time Jaén was a dependency of Granada, and the appellation conflict may only be apparent.

=== Education ===
At a young age, Abu Hayyan left Spain and travelled extensively for the sake of his studies. Within Spain, he traveled to Málaga, Almería before moving on through Ceuta, Tunis, Alexandria, Cairo, Damietta, Minya, Kush and ‘Aydhab in Africa. Eventually, he reached Mecca for the Hajj pilgrimage and visited Medina before returning to Alexandria. It is said he memorized the corpus of Sibawayh's al-Kitab ('The Book') - several volumes of the foundational Arabic grammar that, for some, held revered authority on the Arabic language approaching that of the Hadith in Islamic law.

=== Teachers ===
Abu Hayyan was a man who loved learning so much that he devoted all of his time and effort to learning. It follows that his achievement of attaining the pinnacle of knowledge mastery during his era should come as no surprise. He has acquired Ijazah and learnt from numerous teachers. He stated that he had received instruction from 450 teachers, yet there were a great number of teachers who granted him ijazah. Al-Safadi, one of Abu Hayyan's students, added that he had 400 teachers, whereas 1500 teachers have granted him ijazah. They were from Andalusia, Maghreb, Egypt, Levant, Hejaz, and Iraq. His teachers provide as evidence of his indisputable expertise in a variety of subjects. In actuality, this gives him the right to be recognised as a multidisciplinary figure in his era. Imam Abu Hayyan is credited by historians with writing a book that includes biographies of his masters. Al-Nudar was the name of the book, but the manuscripts are unavailable.

Abu Hayyan left Andalusia and briefly visited Morocco before spending time in other regions of North Africa, including Ceuta and Bougie. The author has spent some time during this time in hadith circles. After that, he spent some time in Tunisia's hadith scientific circles and received instruction in fiqh from the region's recognised authorities. Among his hadith-related experts were the following: Abu Yakub Yousuf ibn Ibrahim, Abu Muhammad Abdullah ibn Harun, and Abu Abdullah al-Kanani (69A9H/1300AD). He studied under Abu al-Abbas al-Ishbili (699AH/1300AD) in the field of fiqh. After that, he travelled and landed in Mamluk-ruled Egypt. He spent some time studying the hadith and the Qur'an in Alexandria before moving on to Cairo, where he spent the remainder of his days in 679H/ 1279AD23.

Following his residence in Egypt, he studied syntax (nahv) under Baha' al-Din Ibn al-Nahhas (d. 698AH/1299AD), one of Egypt's most illustrious grammar specialists in Arabic philology and an important figure in literature. In terms of sources, in addition to al-Nahhas, his initial qira'at experts were 'Ali ibn Yahya al-Hamadani al-Marbuti (680/1281) and Abu Tahir al-Maliji (681AH/1282AD). He studied prophetic traditions under leading hadith experts such as Ibn Daqiq al-'Id (702AH/1302AD) and al-Dimyati (705AH/1305AD). Furthermore, the author utilised Shams al-Din al-Isfahani in the area of Islamic legal theory (Usul al-Fiqh).

== Scholarly life ==
=== Career ===
After travelling through Hijaz, it is recorded that Abu Hayyan resided in Egypt. Following the passing of his long-time mentor, Ibn Nahhas, he began teaching in his rightful role as a scholar. Later, while working for the Mamluks, he taught morphology (sarf), syntax (nahv), qiraat, hadith, and tafsir in a few large madrasahs. He also held teaching positions in famous scientific institutions in Egypt, including Madrasah al-Mansuriyya and al-Jami 'al-Aqmar. It is noteworthy that he had a cordial relationship with the sultans and other ruling class members of his era.

In Mamluk Egypt, Abu Hayyan was appointed lecturer of the science of Qur'anic exegesis at the college named after the sultan of Egypt, Al-Mansur Qalawun, in Alexandria. Later, he spent a period teaching tafsir in the Mosque of Ibn Tulun in Cairo.

Abu Hayyan won favor at the court of an-Nasir Muhammad; the scholar Fatḥ al-Din Ibn Sayyid al-Nās and he, often judged the poetry contests held during al-Nasir's reign.

=== Students ===
Imam Abu Hayyan taught a wide range of subjects, including Arabic language, hadith (prophetic tradition), fiqh (Islamic jurisprudence), qira'at (Quranic recitation) and tafsir (Quranic interpretation). Many students travelled from all over the world to study under him. This phenomenon can be attributed to the fact that he taught at Cairo's largest mosque and lived long enough to impart knowledge to benefit his society. The Shafi'i historian al-Safadi mentioned the qualities of Abu Hayyan on the following; “The most hard-working of my scholars were Abu Hayyan. He was always engaged in science, and he set aside all of his time for students or wrote articles.” Among his major students who became leading scholars of their period include:

- Taqi al-Din al-Subki
- Jamal al-Din al-Isnawi
- Ibn Aqil
- Al-Safadi
- Ibn Hisham al-Ansari
- Siraj al-Din al-Bulqini
- Taj al-Din al-Subki

== Death ==
Abu Hayyan died on a Saturday in July in the year 1344 at his home in Cairo, just after the last evening prayer. He was buried the next day in the cemetery of Bab al-Nasr in Islamic Cairo. When news of his death reached Damascus, the population mourned his death.

== His family and moral structure ==
Abu Hayyan was reportedly married and has two kids. Zumrud binti Abrak (d. 722H/1322AD) was his wife, and she went by "Ummu Hayyan". The sources state that she taught hadith because she was a learned woman. Abu Hayyan's offspring were a girl named Nudar (d. 730H/1330AD) and a son named Hayyan (d. 763H/1363AD). In addition to having a permission certificate from his father and other instructors, Hayyan was a knowledgeable student of hadith. It is mentioned in the pertinent sources that Abu Hayyan cherished his daughter dearly. Nudar also studied the Arabic language, hadith, and qira'at; she was granted permission in these areas. Al-Dimyati, al-Barzali, and al-Zubayr are a few of Nudar's well-known instructors. In addition, Abu Hayyan requested permission from Sayf al-Din Arghun al-Nasir, the Mamluk Sultan, to bury his late daughter Nudar in his mansion's garden. Nudar died at a young age. Such permissions were not typical, and it seems the request was granted due to his high standing with the royal court. Abu Hayyan was deeply affected by his daughter's death and he composed an elegy in praise of her standing among intellectual circles.

Not only was Abu Hayyan regarded by his followers as a pious scholar, but he was also well-liked and polite in public. In addition, he was someone who gets excited when the Quran is recited. Kamal al-Din claims that although love and heroic poetry moved Abu Hayyan, poetry about charity had no such effect on him. Rather than bragging about his charity, the author complimented himself on his thrift. Al-Safadi, one of his students, explained this attitude by pointing to Abu Hayyan's discomfort on his scientific expedition and the fact that he had visited numerous places.

=== Characteristics ===
Abu Hayyan was said to be generally handsome, tall and long haired, which, along with his beard, turned grey in old age.

== Theological and juridical position ==
=== Creed ===
Instead of adopting the schools of the Mu'tazilah and Mujassimah (Anthropomorphists), Abu Hayyan followed the Sunni creed of Islam which is known as Ahl al-Sunnah Wal-jama'ah. The middle path referring to the Ash'arite school that Abu al-Hasan al-Ash'ari established. Muhammad bin {Abd al-Rahman al-Maghrawi noted that the Imam adhered to the Ash'ari school of thought when reading Quranic passages about the Names and Attributes of Allah in Al-Bahr al-Muhit. He disagreed with the Mu'tazili school of thought, particularly with al-Zamakhshari's viewpoints. For example while dealing with verse 55 of al-Baqarah; And [remember] when you declared, "O Moses, indeed we shall not believe thee until we see God face to face!"

In reference to this verse, Abu Hayyan stated that there are still disagreements among Muslim scholars on the possibility of seeing Allah even in the Hereafter, whereas al-Zamakhshari claimed that this outright was impossible. The majority of Muslim scholars hold that we can see Allah with our naked eyes in the hereafter. This is contrast to the Qadariyah, Mu'tazila, Najjariyah, Jahmiyya, and their likes. Imam Abu Hayyan drew attention to this and defended the consensus since it is supported by so many prophetic traditions. Additionally, Abu Hayyan highlighted that al-Zamakhshari's fanaticism of his school of thought caused him to utilise religious passages out of context.

It is evident from his writings that Abu Hayyan could not stand the idea of philosophy; upon his arrival in Egypt, he saw that many Egyptians accepted philosophy without any reservations. He was quite startled and Abu Hayyan said "even we the Andalusians hate philosophy!"

Numerous scholars praised Abu Hayyan's creed. Al-Kamal Ja'far was one of them, stating that Imam Abu Hayyan is dependable, strong, and trustworthy, and his doctrine is free of all philosophical heresies, including Mu'tazilah and Mujassimah. Abu Hayyan was hailed by Kamal al-Din al-Adfuwi as a learnt and reliable man whose credo was free of all philosophical heresies, including Mu'tazilah and Mujassimah. The scholars concur that he adhered to the teachings of the Salaf al-Salih.

=== Legal school ===
Since Zahiri was Andalus's prominent school of fiqh at the time, Imam Abu Hayyan was a disciple of the school when he lived there. He saw that Zahiri school is not highly renowned in Egypt after arriving there. He so adhered to the Shafi'i school and read Al-Muharrar, a work authored by Imam al-Rafi'i, and Minhaj al-Talibin, which was written by Imam al-Nawawi. Before he manually duplicated the book, he studied and committed to memory a portion of Minhaj al-Talibin. He then summed it up and gave it the name al-Wahhaj.

Despite adhering to the Shafi'i school, the Zahiri doctrine still had significant influence on him. Al-Isnawi did note that Imam Abu Hayyan was more inclined towards the Ahl al-Zahir school, and at times this was overt. Regarding the Quranic commentary, Imam Abu Hayyan appeared to favour the literal interpretation of the text, occasionally citing Ibn Hazm's view in cases where there was disagreement over the legal provisions. As he noted it in the book of al-Bahr al-Muhit, he also summarised Ibn Hazm's work, Al-Muhalla.

Others view that Abu Hayyan remained within the Zahiri madhhab of Sunni Islam. When asked toward the end of his life about a claim he had switched to the Shafi'i madhhab, or some other school, he responded that, anyone who had known the Ẓāhirī school could never leave it.

== Views ==
He regarded the Sufism and metaphysics of ibn Arabi, Mansur Al-Hallaj, Ibn al-Farid, Ibn Sab'in and Abu al-Hasan al-Shushtari, as heretical. He was a contemporary of Ibn Taymiyyah, and Abu Hayyan denied that he belonged to orthodox Islam (Ahl al-Sunnah), accusing him of anthropomorphism.

On the Arabic language, Abu Hayyan shared the views of his fellow Ẓāhirī Andalusian, Ibn Maḍāʾ. Absolute belief in the divine mover led them to reject the concept of linguistic causality. For them the 'cause' of all things, including language, is attributable solely to God. Thus on theological grounds, he was suspicious of the so-called "eastern grammarian" supporters of 'linguistic causality'.

When Abu Hayyan arrived in Egypt the Mamluk Sultan was ruler. Although Abu Hayyan held the Turkic languages of Mamluk Egypt superior to the Kipchak and Turkmen languages with which he was familiar, he also wrote grammars of Amharic, Middle Mongol, the Berber languages and the Turkic. Other Arabic-language linguists of his day had little regard for foreign languages. Abu Hayyan often illuminated Arabic grammatical concepts with quotes from various language.

== Legacy ==
Abu Hayyan, the so-called 'king of grammar', was celebrated as the unrivalled linguistic scholar and religious expert of hadith, historiography and Sharia. He is referred to alternately as Abu Hayyan "al-Gharnati" ('the Granadian') and Abu Hayyan "al-Nahwi" ('the grammarian').

Abu Hayyan was highly revered in the domains of morphology and syntax during his time. As a result, Abu Hayyan became one of the leading figures in the fields of Quran exegesis and left his mark on history with his proficiency on the science of Quran recitation (qira'at). Indeed, it is known that the author was considered as one of the major heads of Arabic philology; as such, he was given the prestigious titles “Amir al-Mu'minin fī al-Nahw” ("Leader of the Believers in Grammar"), “Sibawayh of the century”, and “Lisan al-Arab”. Furthermore, it was evident that Abu Hayyan was proficient in Turkish, Persian, and Ethiopian; although he was well-known for his knowledge of Arabic, the author had also written in these languages to demonstrate his competence in related fields.

Abu Hayyan's studies of grammar were governed by overarching principles he laid out such as "one must base rules of Arabic on frequency of occurrence" and "analogous formations that contradict genuine data found in good speech are not permitted." His approach to grammar has been described by Brill's Encyclopaedia of Islam as remarkably modern, and Abu Hayyan's respect for facts and unusual objectivity have also been noted.

== Works ==
Abu Hayyan began writing books at an early age and produced significant works that established their reputation for generations, particularly in the fields of commentary, qiraat, and Arabic language science. He also gathered works in the domains of hadith and stratification. The author also highlighted his proficiency in the languages of Persia, Abyssinian, and Turkish (Kipchak Turkish); he also produced works in this area. Because of his controversial achievements in the field of syntax, Abu Hayyan was considered the Sibawayh of his time (nahv). Another known fact is, although Abu Hayyan authored most of his works in prose, he wrote works in poetic genre as well. He is said to have written 65 works and the following:

=== Exegesis ===
- Al-Bahr al-Muhit (اتفسير البحر المحيط); 'The Explanation Ocean' (Bayrūt, Dār al-Fikr, 1992); archive.org (12 vols., in Arabic); commentary on the linguistic meanings of Quran, composed in collaboration with al-Mansur, late in Gharnati's life. Some of the extraordinary rich non-canonical qira'at, or variant Qur'anic readings, appear first in this, his most famous work of commentary.
- Tafsir al-Nahr al-Mad min al-Bahr, a sumuary of Tafsir al-Bahir an-Muhit
- Ithaf al-Arib bi ma fi al-Qur’an al-Gharib, a concise book on the extraordinary vocabulary of the Qur'an (Gharib al-Qur’an).

=== Arabic language ===
- Kitāb Manhaj al-sālik fī al-kalām 'alá Alfīyyat Ibn Mālik (منهج السالك في الكلام على ألفية ابن مالك) - 'Commentary to the Alfiyya of Ibn Mālik'; several grammarians composed commentaries on ibn Malik's Alfiya, a seminal work in the field of Arabic grammar. archive.org (in Arabic; ed., Glazer, Sidney, 1947)
- Al-Tadhyil wa't-Takmil fi sharh kitab at-Tashil (التذييل والتكميل في شرح كتاب التسهيل) archive.org (in Arabic, 15 vols.); commentary on ibn mālik’s Tashīl.
- al-Mubdiʻ fī al-taṣrīf (كتاب المبدع في التصريف) (in Arabic; Ṣafāt, al-Kuwayt, Maktabat Dār al-ʻUrūbah, 1982); on Arabic language word formation.
- Une Grammaire turque du huitième siècle de l'Hégire; "La Pénétration dans la langue des Turcs" d'Aboû Ḥayyân al-Gharnaṭî. (ed., Bouvat, Lucien; 1907).
- Tuhfat al'Arib bima fi al-Quran min al-Gharib (تحفة الأريب بما في القرآن من الغريب) archive.org (in Arabic)
- Tadhkirat al-nuḥāh (تذكرة النحاة) 'Concerning Grammarians'; (Bayrūt, Muʼassasat al-Risālah, 1986)
- Irtishaf ad-ḍarab min lisan al-'Arab (ارتشاف الضرب من لسان العرب) 'Sipping from the Arab Tongue'; archive.org (in Arabic); a comprehensive grammatical treatise.
- Sharḥ al-Lamḥah al-Badrīyah fī ʻilm al-lughah al-ʻArabīyah (شرح اللمحة البدرية في علم اللغة العربية) 'The Badriyah explanation in Arabic linguistics' (ed., Dr. Hadi Nahr, University Press, Baghdad, 1997) archive.org (in Arabic)
- Al-Nukat al-ḥisān fī sharḥ ghāyat al-iḥsān (النكت الحسان في شرح غاية الإحسان) 'Beautiful Anecdotes on Explanation of the Utmost Good' (Beirut, Muʼassasat al-Risālah, 1985) archive.org (in Arabic)
- Taqrīb al-muqarrib (تقريب المقرب); a summary of ibn ʿUṣfūr's Muqarrib
- Al-Tadrīb fī tamṯīl al-taqrīb (التدريب في تمثيل التقريب); a commentary on his Taqrīb al-muqarrib.

=== Other languages ===
- Kitab al-Idrak li Lisan al-Atrak (كتاب الإدراك للسان الأتراك) -'Aspects of the Turkish language' archive (in Arabic)
- al-Af’al fi Lisan al-Atrak
- Zahw al-Mulk fi Nahw al-Tur
- Nafkhah al-Misk fi Sirah al-Turk
- Nour al-Ghabash fi Lisan al-Habash
- Mantiq al-Khurs fi Lisan al-Furs
- Al-Mahmour fi Lisan al-Yahmur

=== Qur'anic recitation (al-qirâ'ât) ===
- Al-Mudhn al-‘Amir fi Qiraat Ibn ‘Amir
- Al-Athir fi Qira'at Ibn Kathir
- Al-Nafi fi Qira'at al-Nafi’
- Taqrib al-Nai fi Qira'at al-Kisa'i
- Al-Ramz fi Qira'at Hamzah
- Al-Rawd al-Basim fi Qira'at Asim
- Al-Nayyir al-Jaliyy fi Qiraat Zayd ibn Ali
- Ghayah al-Matlub fi Qiraat Yakub
- Iqd al-Laali fi Qiraat al-Sab' al-'Awali
- Al-Hulal al-Haliyah fî Athanid al-Qiraah al-Aliyah
- Al-Mawrid al-Ghamr fi Qiraat Abu 'Amr

=== Islamic jurisprudence and Hadith studies ===
- Juz' fi al-Hadith
- Al-Tus'ayyat
- Al-Wahhaj fi Ikhtisar al-Minhaj
- Al-a'lam bi Arkan al-Islam
- Masaik al-Rushd fi Tajred Mathail Nihayah Ibn Rushd
- Al-Anwar al-Ajla fi Ikhtisar al-Mukhalla

=== History ===
- Tukhfah al-Nadus fi Nuhat Andalus
- Majan alHasr fa adâbi wa tarawih Ahl al-'Asr
- Al-Nudar fi Maslati an Nudar
- Mashyahat Ibn Abu Mansur
- Al-Bayan fi Shuyuh Abu Hayyan wa Tarikh al-Andalus

=== Poetry, Literature, and Rhetoric ===
- Dīwān Abī Ḥayyān al-Andalusī (ديوان أبي حيان الأندلسي) archive.org
- Naqd al-Sha'r
- Khulasa al-Tibyan fi 'Ilm al-Badi' wa al-Bayan
- Al-Abyat al-Wafiyah fi 'Ilm al-Kafiyah
- Nasr al-Zahr and Nazm al-Zuhr
- Nawafis al-Sihr fi Damais al-Sha'r
- Al-Mawrid al-Athb Muaradati Qasidah Ka'b

== Bibliography ==
- Mohd Faizulamri Saad (2012). "Abu Hayyan Al-Andalusi: A Qira'at figure of the 8th century". Journal of Applied Sciences Research. 8 (8). National University of Malaysia: 4181–4186. ISSN 1819-544X.
- Sumeyye Dogru, M. Emin Dogru (2019). Abu Hayyan Al-Andalusi: An Andalusian Arab Linguist in the Mamluks. International Islamic University Malaysia. pp. 114–130.
