= Al-Kashshaaf =

Book by al-Zamakhsharī

- Author: Al-Zamakhshari
- Original title: ٱلْكَشَّاف
- Translator: Various
- Language: Arabic
- Subject: Qur'anic exegesis (Tafsir)
- Genre: Islamic literature
- Published: 12th century
- Publication place: Persia (modern-day Iran)
- Media type: Print (hardcover and paperback)
- Pages: Multiple volumes

Al-Kashshaaf 'an Haqa'iq at-Tanzil, popularly known as Al-Kashshaaf (Arabic: ٱلْكَشَّاف, romanized: al-Kaššāf, lit. 'the Revealer') is a seminal tafsir (commentary on the Qur'an) by Al-Zamakhshari written in the 12th century. Considered a primary source by major scholars, it is famous for its deep linguistic analysis, demonstrations of the supremacy of declamation of the Qur'an, and the representation of the method the Qur'an uses to convey meaning using literary elements and figurative speech. However, it is criticized for the inclusion of Muʿtazilah philosophical views.

== Background ==
Al-Zamakhshari strongly insisted that scholars of the Muʿtazilah sect should have a basis tafsir of their own. Therefore, he started writing his commentary in 1132, after he was convinced by Emîr Ebü'l-Hasan İbn Vehhâs while he was residing in Mecca, and finished it in two years. He himself states that writing such a book in a short time is a blessing of God.

== Literary Foundations ==
Modern scholars recognize that al-Kashshāf draws on earlier exegetical, Arabic linguistic, and rhetorical traditions, mainly from Tafsīr al-Basīṭ by al-Wāḥidī (d. 468/1076) and Dalā’il al-iʿjāz by ʿAbd al-Qāhir al-Jurjānī (d. 471/1078).

Tafsīr al-Basīṭ is widely recognized for its detailed grammatical analysis and philological precision, providing extensive attention to syntax, morphology, and the linguistic subtleties of the Qur’an. Al-Zamakhsharī continues in this tradition extensively by incorporating close linguistic examination into his commentary. However, al-Kashshāf goes further by integrating a robust rhetorical dimension shaped by the influence of ʿAbd al-Qāhir al-Jurjānī.

Dalā’il al-iʿjāz had a profound impact on the approach of al-Kashshāf. Al-Jurjānī's concept of naẓm—the idea that the miraculous nature of the Qur’an lies in the structure and arrangement of its words—became a foundational concept in later tafsīr literature. Al-Zamakhsharī applies these ideas extensively, analyzing Qur'anic verses with attention to their rhetorical and stylistic elements, often in line with Jurjānī's theories. As noted in secondary literature, al-Kashshāf is widely considered the first rhetorical-focused commentary.

Through this synthesis, al-Kashshāf is viewed by scholars as a key link between linguistic tafsīr and the mature science of Arabic rhetoric (ʿilm al-balāgha), influencing both Muʿtazilī and Sunnī commentators in subsequent generations.

== Content ==
In the preface, it is pointed out that commenting on the Quran is a challenging and difficult effort; and any mufassir willing to do so must have deep knowledge of Arabic language, literature, eloquence and culture, alongside critical thinking skills, a highly disciplined way of studying and general academic skills. Comments are a blend of logic and narrative, including many hadith (though the only source stated for these narratives is Sahih Muslim) and older accounts of Arabic poems. A very elegant analysis of words is done throughout the commentary, while figurative expressions are broken down, and appropriate qira'at is chosen where needed. Abrogated verses are indicated along with their successors. Verses containing Islamic jurisprudence are deduced according to the Hanafi school of law. Verses that seem contrary are reconciled.

== Criticism ==
=== Muʿtazilah viewpoint ===
One of the most criticized aspects of Al-Zamakhshari’s interpretations is his adaptation of Quranic verses according to a Mu’tazilite viewpoint. For those who vehemently oppose the Mu'tazilites and their views, Al-Zamakhshari has purportedly interpreted verses that cohere with his viewpoint as muhkam (rigid or univocal), and those which do not as mutashabih (ambiguous, equivocal, or allegorical). Thus, opponents of the Mu'tazilites accused him of "abandoning the apparent meanings" of some verses for the sake of preserving a strict Mu’tazilah view. Consequently, some have made "responses" to Al-Zamakhshari's, such as ِِ'Al-'intişaaf min Al-Kashshaaf "Vengeance against Al-Kashshaaf" by Ibn Munir Al-Sakandari (1223-1284).

== Editions ==
There are at least three different editions of the book. Ibn Hisham al-Ansari speculated some errors with some meanings given to certain words, correcting them in his abridgement of the book.

== Related works ==
- Tafsir al-Baydawi is largely a condensed and amended edition of Al-Kashshaaf
- Tafsir al-Nisaburi
