= Makki ibn Abi Talib al-Qaysi =

Mālikī jurist and scholar

Personal life
- Born: 23 Shaʿbān 354 AH; 25 August 965 CE Kairouan; Fatimid Caliphate (present Tunisia)
- Died: 2 Muḥarram 437 AH; 21 July 1045 CE Cordova; Andalusia (present Spain)

Religious life
- Religion: Islam
- Sect: Sunni
- Jurisprudence: Maliki
- Creed: Ash'ari

Muslim leader
- Influenced by: Ibn Abi Zayd, Al-Qabisi

Abū Muḥammad Makkī ibn Abī Ṭālib al-Qaysī al-Qayrawānī al-Andalusī al-Qurṭubī was a Mālikī jurist and, in the assessment of Angelika Neuwirth, "one of the earliest and most distinguished scholars in the science of Ḳurʾān reading [...] and especially the theory and art of recitation [...] in the Muslim West".

== Life ==
Makkī was born in al-Qayrawān, in present-day Tunisia, on 23 Shaʿbān 354 AH/25 August 965 CE. According to some sources, the ancestry of his father Abū Ṭālib was Ḥammūsh ibn Muḥammad, who was himself the son of Mukhtār, but Angelika Neuwirth regards this lineage as uncertain. Makkī is known to have travelled east to study in Cairo, focusing on philology, qirāʾa (Qurʾān-reading) and tajwīd (recitation); his studies there brought him into contact with leading scholars, including Abū Bakr al-Udfuwī (304–88 AH/916–98CE), and the father and son Abu l-Ṭayyib ʿAbd al-Munʿim ibn Ghalbūn al-Ḥalabī (d. 389 AH/999 CE) and Ṭāhir ibn Ghalbūn (d. 399 AH/1008CE). He studied in Cairo during the period 368–74 AH (978–84 CE); returned to al-Qayrawān for three years (during which time he studied with the jurists al-Qābisī (d. 403/1011) and Ibn Abī Zayd (d. 386/996)); spent 377–79 and 382–83 AH (987–89 and 992–93 CE) back in Cairo; and then 387–90 AH (998–1001 CE) in Mecca, where alongside studying and ḥajj he seems to have begun writing. His homeward journey took him through Jerusalem and Cairo.

After two years in al-Qayrawān, Makkī departed for al-Andalus, where he spent the second half of his life and where he produced most of his eighty or more works. He arrived in 393 AH (1003 CE) and began to teach Qurʾān reading at the Masjid al-Nukhayla in Cordova's ʿAṭṭārīn district. According to Angelika Neuwirth, "it is largely due to him that the new development in Ḳurʾān reading scholarship which is connected with the Bag̲h̲dādī Imām al-ḳurrāʾ, Ibn Mud̲j̲āhid (d. 324/936 [...]) spread so soon via Aleppo and Cairo to Spain". Makkī held various religious and pedagogical posts in Cordova until his death in the city on 2 Muḥarram 437 AH (21 July 1045 CE).

== Works ==
Al-Makkī write over eighty works, including Kitab al-Tadhkira fi l-qirāʾāt, which was influenced by Ṭāhir ibn Ghalbūn's teachings; Kitāb al-Tabṣira; Kitāb al-Kashf; Kitāb Mushkil gharīb al-Qurʾān; Kitāb Mushkil iʿrāb al-Qurʾān, and Kitāb al-Kashf ʿan wujūh al-ḳirāʾāt al-sabʿ . He composed comprehensive commentary on the Qurʾān; this is believed to be lost, but al-Īḍāḥ li-nāsikh al-Qurʾān wa-mansūkhih, a treatise on "the special tafsīr problem of the abrogated verses" is known.
