= Walid Saleh =

Lebanese scholar of the Quran

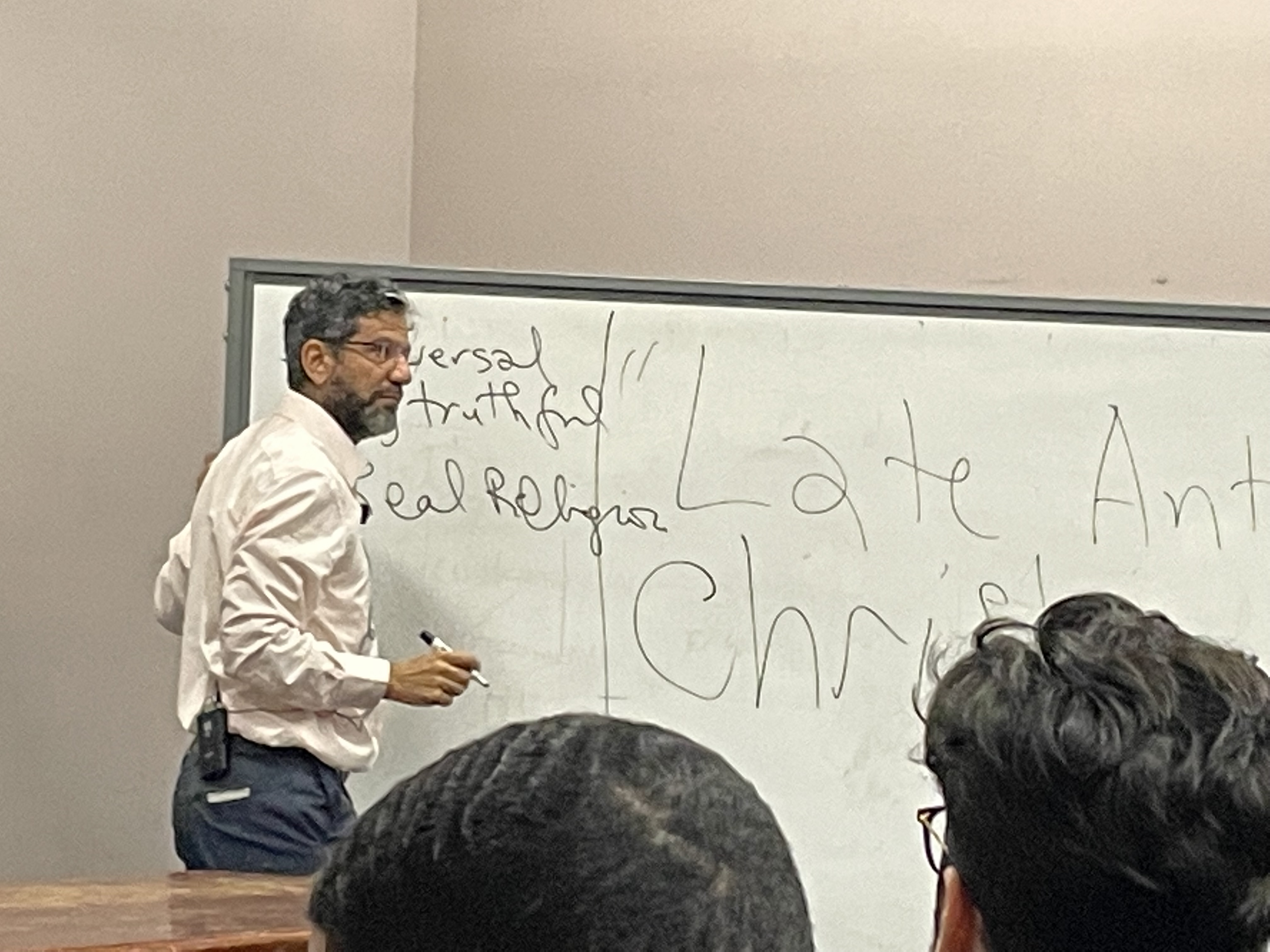
Walid Saleh lecturing at the University of Toronto

Walid Ahmad Saleh is a Lebanese scholar of Quranic exegesis and a professor of Islamic studies at the University of Toronto.

His work explores the Qur'an, the history of Qur'anic interpretation, the Arabic manuscript tradition, Islamic apocalyptic thought, and Muslim engagement with the Bible.

== Biography ==
=== Education ===
Walid Saleh attended the American University of Beirut, graduating with a BA in Arabic language and literature in 1989. He later pursued graduate studies at Yale University, obtaining an MA in 1996 and completing his PhD in Islamic studies in 2001, supervised by Gerhard Bowering. He received a DAAD grant in 1996–1997, and studied in Hamburg under the tutelage of the late Albrecht Noth.

=== Career ===
Saleh served as an assistant professor at Middlebury College in Vermont, USA, from 1999 to 2002. He then joined the University of Toronto in 2002 as an assistant professor, where he held various academic roles. He received tenure in 2007 and was promoted to associate professor. Later, he became a Distinguished Professor, serving in that capacity from 2010 to 2013.

Saleh has received numerous honors and fellowships. He was awarded a New Directions Fellowship by the Mellon Foundation in 2014, and the Humboldt Foundation in Germany has made him a Konrad Adenauer Fellow (2017). Additionally, he has received funding from the SSHRC and the Library of Congress' Kluge Foundation.

== Selected works ==
- In Defense of the Bible: A Critical Edition and an Introduction to Al-Biqa`i's Bible Treatise
- The Formation of the Classical Tafsir Tradition

== See also ==
- Behnam Sadeghi
- Burhan al-Din al-Biqa'i
- Rudi Paret
