= Kamal (name) =

Kamal is a masculine given name used in several languages.

- From Sanskrit, it is usually spelled Kamal for males and Kamala for females, meaning "lotus". But also it can be "pale red" or "delicate".
- Kamal or Kamaal (Arabic: كمال‌ kamāl) or Turkish Kemal. The Arabic name which is also a noun means "perfection, integrity". The name bears the notion of "completeness of a thing without any deficiency" and "perfection of morals and ethics (adjective: اِكْتِمال iktimāl)". Also the name may be used as an abbreviation of Kamal ad-Din.
- In Persian, it means "beauty, perfection, excellence, completion, utmost level".
- Azerbaijanis use it as a male name in the meaning of "competent, mature".
- In Turkish, it is the misspelling of Kamâl which means "siege, blockade, encirclement" (from the Uzbek qamal) and "castle, rampart" (from the Kazakh қамал [qamal]).
- In Turkish transliteration of Arabic and Persian name كمال, it is sometimes used instead of Kemal. According to Nişanyan Dictionary, most of the parents who named their children Kamal in Hatay Province of Turkey adopted the Arabic spelling of Kemal.

Notable people with the name include:

== Given name ==
- Kamal (director) (born 1957), commonly known name of Malayalam film (India) director Kamaluddin Mohammed
- Kamal Abbas (born 1955), Egyptian activist
- Kamal Abdulfattah (1943–2023), Palestinian geographer and researcher
- Kamal Mustafa Abdullah (born 1952), Iraqi military leader
- Kamal Mehdi Abdullayev (born 1950), Azerbaijani scientist
- Kamal Abeysinghe, Sri Lankan banker and a social entrepreneur
- Kamal Aboki (1997–2023), Nigerian comedian, actor, and skit maker
- Kamal Abu-Deeb (born 1942), Syrian academic
- Kamal Addararachchi (born 1962), Sri Lankan actor
- Kamal Adham (1929–1999), Turkish-born Saudi businessman and intelligence head
- Kamal Bahadur Adhikari (born 1977), Nepalese weightlifter
- Kamal Adli (born 1986), Malaysian actor, model, and host
- Kamal Adwan (1935–1973), Palestinian politician
- Kamal Ahmad (born 1965), Bangladeshi-American educator and social entrepreneur
- Kamal Ahmed, multiple people
- Kamal Ahuja (born 1954), British-Indian physiologist
- Kamal Akhtar (born 1971), Indian politician
- Kamal Mansur Alam (1937–2011), Pakistani jurist
- Kamal Ali, British-Bangladeshi entrepreneur
- Kamal El-Sayed Ali (born 1935), Egyptian wrestler
- Kamal Hassan Ali (1921–1993), Egyptian politician and military hero
- Kamal Aljafari (born 1972), Palestinian filmmaker and visual artist
- Kamal Amer (1942–2021), Egyptian politician and military commander
- Kamal Amin (1923–1979), Egyptian artist
- Kamal Amrohi (1918–1993), Indian film director and screenwriter
- Kamal Ashaari (born 1970), Malaysian politician
- Kamal Ataya (born 1944), Lebanese business executive
- Kamal Al-Athari (born 1959), Kuwaiti judoka
- Kamal Azizi (born 1993), Malaysian footballer
- Kamal Babu (born 1965), Bangladeshi football coach and player
- Kamal Badr, Lebanese-American physician and scientist
- Kamal Bafounta (born 2002), French footballer
- Kamal Bahamdan (born 1970), Saudi Arabian businessman and equestarian
- Kamal Bamadhaj (1970–1991), Malay-Indian human rights activist
- Kamal Kumari Barooah (1899–1978), Indian matriarch of the Khongiya Barooah family
- Kamal Barot (born 1938), Indian female playback singer
- Kamal Bashir (born 1988), Bermudian cricketer
- Kamal Basu (1918–2013), Bengali Indian politician
- Kamal Hanna Bathish (1931–2025), Palestinian Roman Catholic prelate
- Kamal Bayramov (born 1985), Azerbaijani professional footballer
- Kamal Kheir Beik (1935–1980), Syrian poet and dissident
- Kamal Benslama, Moroccan-Swiss experimental particle physicist
- Kamal Bey (born 1998), American Greco-Roman wrestler
- Kamal Kishore Bhagat, Indian politician
- Kamal Bhandarkar (1911–1986), Indian cricketer
- Kamal Bhattacharjee (born 1936), Indian cricketer
- Kamal Bhattacharya (1915–1995), Indian cricketer
- Kamal Bose (1915–1995), Indian cinematographer
- Kamal Boulahfane (born 1976), Algerian runner
- Kamal Boullata (1942−2019), Palestinian artist and art historian
- Kamal Chaudhry (1947–2024), Indian politician and a fighter pilot
- Kamal Prasad Chaulagain, Nepalese politician
- Kamal Choudhary (born 1989), Indian American physicist
- Kamal Chowdhury (born 1957), Bengali poet
- Kamal Chunchie (1886–1953), Sri Lankan Christian minister
- Kamal Daneshyar, Iranian politician
- Kamal Darwish (born 1942), Egyptian sports administrator
- Kamal Das (born 1988), Indian cricketer
- Kamal Krishna Das (born 1921), Indian politician
- Kamal Dasgupta (1911–1974), Bangladeshi music director, lyricist, composer, and folk artist
- Kamal Davar, Indian military officer
- Kamal Degregory (born 1974), Bahamian soccer player
- Kamal Dennis (born 1981), Jamaican cricketer
- Kamal Derwish (1973–2002), Yemeni-American killed by the CIA
- Kamal Desai (1928–2011), Indian novelist
- Kamal Deshapriya, Sri Lankan cinema and television actor
- Kamal Dib, Canadian-Lebanese scholar
- Kamal Mani Dixit (1929–2016), Nepalese writer
- Kamal Kaya Efendi, Turkish military officer
- Kamal Abu Eita (born 1953), Egyptian trade unionist and government minister
- Kamal Elfadel, Sudanese basketball player
- Kamal Oyekunle Fagbemi (born 1963), Nigerian politician
- Kamal Foroughi (1939–2024), British-Iranian businessman imprisoned in Iran
- Kamal Ganzouri (1933–2021), Egyptian economist and politician
- Kamal El-Gargni (born 1971), Libyan bodybuilder
- Kamal Ghanaja (died 2012), Palestinian Hamas official
- Kamal Ghosh (1910–1983), Indian cinematographer and film director
- Kamal Givens (born 1981), American reality television star and rapper
- Kamal Gray, American hip-hop keyboardist, rapper, vocalist, and producer
- Kamal Guha (1928–2007), Indian politician
- Kamal Guliyev (born 1976), Azerbaijani footballer
- Kamal Gunaratne, Sri Lankan army general
- Kamal Gupta (born 1952), Indian politician
- Kamal Gurbanov (born 1995), Azerbaijani footballer
- Kamal Haasan (born 1954), film actor in Tamil cinema
- Kamal Habib, Egyptian political analyst, political science professor, and journalist
- Kamal Habibollahi (1930–2016), the final commander of the Imperial Iranian Navy
- Kamal Hachkar (born 1977), French-Moroccan filmmaker and academic
- Kamal Hadden (born 2001), American football player
- Kamal al-Hadithi (1939–2018), Iraqi poet and journalist
- Kamal Haider (politician) (1947–2024), Bangladeshi politician, journalist, and freedom fighter
- Kamal El-Hajji (born 1958/59), British Security Official and civil servant
- Kamal Ben Hameda (born 1954), Libyan jazz musician and writer
- Kamal Bani Hani, Jordanian gastrointestinal surgeon
- Kamal Ali Hassan (1924–1984), Egyptian diver
- Kamal Haydar (1933–1980), Yemeni writer
- Kamal al-Haydari (born 1956), Iraqi Shia cleric
- Kamal Heer (born 1973), Indo-Canadian Punjabi singer
- Kamal Hossain (born 1937), Bangladeshi lawyer and politician
- Kamal Hossain (kabaddi) (born 1978), Bangladeshi kabaddi player
- Kamal Hussain (wrestler) (born 1932), Egyptian wrestler
- Kamal Ibrahim, multiple people
- Kamal Indrajith (born 1977), Sri Lankan cricketer
- Kamal Irani (1932–1989), Pakistani film actor
- Kamal Issah (born 1992), Ghanaian footballer
- Kamal Jabbour (born 1957), Lebanese-American Air Force scientist
- Kamal Prasad Jabegu (born 1958), Nepalese politician
- Kamal Jafarov (born 1989), Azerbaijani politician
- Kamal Jamro (1972–2020), Indian professor, writer, educationist, researcher, and poet
- Kamal Nath Jha (1923–2003), Indian freedom fighter and social activist
- Kamal Johnson (born 1991), American football player
- Kamal Jumblatt (1917–1977), Lebanese politician
- Kamal Kaan, British playwright, screenwriter, and actor
- Kamal Kamaraju (born 1981), Indian actor and screenwriter
- Kamal Kamyabinia (born 1989), Iranian professional footballer
- Kamal Kapoor (1920–2010), Indian actor and producer
- Kamal Karunanayake (1937–2006), Sri Lankan politician
- Kamal Khalil, Egyptian engineer
- Kamal Khan, multiple people
- Kamal Kharazi (1944–2026), Iranian politician and diplomat
- Kamal Khatri (born 1983), Nepali singer, songwriter, and composer
- Kamal Khera (born 1989), Indian-born Canadian politician
- Kamal Khudaverdiyev (1928–2008), Azerbaijani actor
- Kamal Khujandi (1320–1400), Persian Sufi and ghazal poet
- Kamal Kishor (born 1956), Indian politician
- Kamal Kumar (died 2023), Fijian jurist
- Kamal Kumbhar, Indian social entrepreneur
- Kamal bin Kupli, Malaysian killer sentenced to death in Singapore
- Kamal al-Labwani (born 1957), Syrian doctor and artist
- Kamal Lazraq (born 1984), Moroccan filmmaker
- Kamal Lohani (1934–2020), Bangladeshi journalist
- Kamal Khan-Magomedov (born 1986), Russian judoka
- Kamal Mahgoub (1921–2007), Egyptian weightlifter
- Kamal Mahsud (died 2010), Pakistani folk singer
- Kamal Kumar Majumdar (1914–1979), Indian writer
- Kamal P. Malla (1936–2018), Nepalese linguist
- Kamal el-Mallakh (1918–1987), Egyptian archaeologist
- Kamal Məmmədbəyov (1924–1997), one of the first honored architects of Azerbaijan
- Kamal Al-Mansour, African American programmer and artist
- Kamal Hassan Mansur (1935–2002), Libyan politician
- Kamal Marskole, Indian politician
- Kamal Martin (born 1998), American football player
- Kamal Masud (born 1979), Pakistani Olympic swimmer
- Kamal Matinuddin (1926–2017), Pakistani general, diplomat, and military historian
- Kamal Meattle, Indian environmental activist
- Kamal Merchant (born 1956), Pakistani cricketer player, coach, and umpire
- Kamal Miller (born 1997), Canadian soccer player
- Kamal Mirzəyev (born 1994), Azerbaijani professional footballer
- Kamal Mitra (1912–1993), Indian actor
- Kamal Kamel Mohammed (born 1945), Egyptian basketball player
- Kamal Mokdad (born 1974), Moroccan banker
- Kamal-ol-molk (1848–1940), Iranian painter
- Kamal Mondal (born 1982), Indian cricketer
- Kamal Morarka (1946–2021), Indian union minister and businessman
- Kamal Kenawi Ali Moustafa (born 1956), Egyptian swimmer
- Kamal Mustafa (born 1991), Swedish footballer
- Kamal Najamuddin (born 1954), Pakistani cricketer
- Kamal Naji (1951–2009), Lebanese-Palestinian representative
- Kamal Nasser (1924–1973), Palestinian political leader, writer and poet
- Kamal Nath (born 1946), Indian Union Minister
- Kamal Riad Noseir (1912–1996), Egyptian basketball player
- Kamal Passi (born 1992), Indian cricketer
- Kamal Patel, multiple people
- Kamal Pushpakumara, Sri Lankan cricketer
- Kamal Qadir (born 1958), Iraqi-Kurdish human rights activist
- Kamal Qarur (born 1966), Algerian writer, novelist, storyteller, and journalist
- Kamal al-Qassab (1853–1954), Syrian politician
- Kamal Quadir (born 1971), Bangladeshi-American entrepreneur and artist
- Kamal Quliyev (born 1976), retired international footballer from Azerbaijan
- Kamal Qurbanov (born 1995), Azerbaijani professional footballer
- Kamal Qureshi (born 1970), Danish-Pakistani politician
- Kamal Ram (1924–1982), Indian recipient of the Victoria Cross
- Kamal Rana (1928–2026), Nepalese politician
- Kamal Ranadive (1917–2001), Indian biomedical researcher
- Kamal Abdel Rehim (born 1974), Egyptian rower
- Kamal Rifaat (1921–1977), Egyptian military officer and politician
- Kamal Roy, Indian Bollywood actress
- Kamal Ruhayyim (1947–2023), Egyptian writer
- Kamal Saaliti (born 1979), Moroccan-Norwegian footballer
- Kamal Sabti (1954–2006), Iraqi poet
- Kamal Sadanah (born 1970), Indian actor, producer, and director
- Kamal Sagar (born 1969), Indian architect, designer, real estate developer, restaurateur, and music enthusiast
- Kamal Sajjadi, Iranian diplomat
- Kamal Al Din Salah (1910–1957), Egyptian diplomat
- Kamal Saleem (born 1957), Lebanese-American self-claimed former Muslim terrorist
- Kamal Salibi (1929–2011), Lebanese Christian historian and professor
- Kamal Salih (1946–2025), Malaysian economist, physician, policy advisor, academic administrator, and politician
- Kamal Sarabandi (born 1956), Iranian-American scientist from University of Michigan
- Kamal Kumar Sethi, Indian neurologist
- Kamal Shaddad (born 1935), Sudanese professor
- Kamal Bahadur Shah (born 1965), Nepalese politician
- Kamal Al-Shair (1930–2008), Jordanian politician and engineer
- Kamal Shalorus (born 1972), Iranian mixed martial arts fighter
- Kamal Sharma (1970–2019), Indian political activist
- Kamal al-Shawish, Yemeni human rights activist
- Kamal Shedge (1935–2020), Indian typographer and type designer
- Kamal Shehadi, Lebanese economist, telecommunications executive, and politician
- Kamal El Sheikh (1919–2004), Egyptian film director
- Kamal el-Shennawi (1921–2011), Egyptian film and television actor, director, and producer
- Kamal Shrestha (born 1997), Nepalese footballer
- Kamal Siddiqi, Australian journalist of Pakistani and Nigerian origin
- Kamal Sidhu (born 1968), Canadian actress
- Kamal Sido (born 1961), Syrian-Kurdish interpreter, translator, and author
- Kamal Siegel (born 1978), Chilean musician and digital artist
- Kamal Singh, multiple people
- Kamal Al-Solaylee (born 1964), Yemeni-Canadian journalist
- Kamal Somaia (born 1968), English cricketer
- Kamal Sowah (born 2000), Ghanaian footballer
- Kamal Stino (1910–1987), Egyptian politician
- Kamal Subedi, Nepalese politician
- Kamal Swaroop, Indian screenwriter and director
- Kamal Tabrizi (born 1959), Iranian film director
- Kamal Kumar Tanti (born 1982), Indian poet
- Kamal Tarbas (born 1950), Sudanese singer-songwriter
- Kamal Al Taweel (1922–2003), Egyptian composer and music author
- Kamal Nath Tewari (1907–1974), Indian politician
- Kamal Thapa (born 1955), Nepalese politician
- Kamal Youcef-Toumi (born 1954), Algerian-American mechanical engineer
- Kamal Rani Varun (1958–2020), Indian politician
- Kamal Vora (born 1950), Indian poet, editor, and translator
- Kamal Ziani (born 1972), Moroccan-Spanish long-distance runner
- Mohd Kamal Hassan (1942–2023), Malaysian Islamic scholar
- Mostafa Kamal Pasha (born 1950), Bangladeshi politician
- Mostafa Kamal Tolba (1922–2016), Egyptian scientist

== Surname ==
- Abdallah Kamal (1965–2014), Egyptian journalist and politician
- A. H. M. Mustafa Kamal (born 1947), Bangladeshi politician, cricket official, and businessman
- A. K. M. Shahjahan Kamal (1950–2023), Bangladeshi politician
- Doğa Rutkay Kamal (born 1978), Turkish actress and TV presenter
- Ğaliäsğar Kamal (1879–1933), Tatar writer
- Ibrahim Ahmed Kamal (born 1969), lead guitarist for Bangladeshi heavy metal bands Aurthohin and Warfaze
- İlham Namiq Kamal (born 1949), Azerbaijani actor and director
- Kadir Kamal (born 2000), Turkish Greco-Roman wrestler
- Kayser Kamal (born 1972), Bangladeshi politician
- Kerem Kazım Kamal (born 1999), Turkish Greco-Roman wrestler
- Meena Keshwar Kamal (1956–1987), Afghan activist
- Mostafa Kamal (1947–1971), Bangladeshi freedom fighter
- Mustafa Kamal (born 1971), Pakistani politician
- Osama Kamal (born 1959), Egyptian engineer and politician
- Ribhi Kamal (1913–1979), Palestinian scholar
- Said Kamal (1938–2017), Palestinian politician
- Syed Kamal (1937–2009), Pakistani film actor, director and producer
- Şärif Kamal (1884–1942), Tatar writer
- Trisutji Kamal (1936–2021), Indonesian composer
- Yousef Hussain Kamal (born 1948), Qatari politician and businessman
- Zahira Kamal (born 1945), Palestinian activist and politician

== Fictional characters ==
- Kamal el Alaoui, a member of the Acolytes in Marvel Comics
- Alex Kamal, a spaceship pilot and one of the main characters in the novel series The Expanse and in the eponymous TV series based on it.
- Kamal, a character in the Indian KGF (film series)

== See also ==
- Kamala (name), related female given name and surname
- Kamahl (born 1934), Australian singer
- The dictionary definition of Kamâl at Wiktionary
