= 7th Kwara State House of Assembly =

Kwara State legislatures

- Kwara State House of Assembly

Type
- Type: unicameral
- Term limits: 4 years

History
- Founded: October 2, 1979

Leadership
- Speaker of the Assembly: Rt. Hon. Razak Atunwa, People's Democratic Party (PDP) since June 8, 2011
- Deputy Speaker: Mohammed Gana Yisa, People's Democratic Party, PDP since June 8, 2011
- Leader of the House: Hon. since June 8, 2011
- Deputy Leader: Hon. Sadu Yusuf Tanke, People's Democratic Party, APC since June 8, 2011
- Chief Whip: Hon. Audu L. Saidu, People's Democratic Party, PDP
- Minority Leader: Hon, Peoples Democratic party (PDP) since June 8, 2011
- Deputy Chief Whip: Felicia Ebun Owolabi , People's Democratic Party (PDP) since June 8, 2011

Structure
- Seats: 24
- Length of term: 4 years

Elections
- Voting system: Direct election
- Last election: June 8, 2011

The 7th Kwara State House of Assembly is the legislative branch of the Kwara State Government inaugurated on June 8, 2011. The assembly will run its course till June 3, 2015. The assembly is unicameral with 24 representatives elected from each constituencies of the state. The incumbent Speaker of the Kwara State House of Assembly of the 8th Legislative Assembly is Rt. Hon Razak Atunwa and the Deputy speaker is Hon. Sadu Yusuf Tanke. The election of representative for the 8th legislative assembly was held on April 26, 2011.

== Powers and duties ==
The legislative function of the Assembly is to make law by passing bills, which must be endorsed by the two-thirds majority of the house. Following the endorsement by the two-thirds majority, the bill is presented to the Governor, who will sign the bill to become law. The assembly also play a significant role in the appointment of the state commissioners, Chief judges and other top official by the governor.

== Members of the 8th Legislative Assembly ==
1. Razak Atunwa
2. Mohammed Gana Yisa
3. Afolabi Hamid Giwa
4. Abraham A. Ashaolu
5. Audu L. Saidu
6. Tope Olarinoye Olayonu
7. Hassan Oyeleke
8. Adamu I. Sabi
9. Sulaiman S. Idris
10. Raliat A. Adifa
11. M. O Bakare
12. Nimota A. Ibrahim
13. Mande A. Umar
14. Haliru M. Idris
15. Iliasu Ibrahim
16. Sikirat Anako
17. Kamal Oyekunle Fagbemi
18. Abdulkareem Abdulganiyu
19. Salman Abdulfatai
20. David Bamidele
21. F. Ebun Owolabi
22. Felicia M. Ojeleye
23. Abdulkadir S. Ramat
24. Sadu Yusuf Tanke
