= ABCD: Any Body Can Dance =

2013 Indian film by Remo D'Souza

- Theatrical release poster
- Directed by: Remo D'Souza
- Screenplay by: Tushar Hiranandani
- Dialogues by: Amit Aaryan; Mayur Puri (additional)
- Story by: Remo D'Souza
- Produced by: Ronnie Screwvala; Siddharth Roy Kapur
- Starring: Prabhu Deva; Ganesh Acharya; Kay Kay Menon; Lauren Gottlieb; Punit Pathak; Dharmesh Yelande; Salman Yusuff Khan
- Cinematography: Vijay Kumar Arora
- Edited by: Manan Ajay Sagar
- Music by: Sachin–Jigar
- Production company: UTV Spotboy
- Distributed by: UTV Motion Pictures
- Release date: 8 February 2013
- Running time: 143 minutes
- Country: India
- Language: Hindi
- Budget: ₹12 crore

ABCD: Anybody Can Dance is a 2013 Indian Hindi-language dance drama film directed and choreographed by choreographer Remo D'Souza and produced by Ronnie Screwvala and Siddharth Roy Kapur under UTV Spotboy Motion Pictures. The film stars Prabhu Deva in the lead role along with Ganesh Acharya and Kay Kay Menon. The participants in Dance India Dance appear in supporting roles. Along with the Tamil and Telugu dubbed versions titled Aadalam Boys Chinnatha Dance and ABCD respectively, the film, made at a budget of between Rs 120 million, was released worldwide in 3D on 8 February 2013 to mostly positive reviews from critics.

A sequel, Disney's ABCD 2 was released on 19 June 2015.

== Plot ==
Vishnu, a choreographer for Jehangir Dance Company (JDC) quits his job after having a disagreement with his friend and manager, Jehangir Khan. Vishnu observes several proteges of Gopi. Despite their raw talent, they lack the discipline required to become serious dancers. They demonstrate this disastrously at a local event for a politician. After witnessing the youngsters show their dancing abilities, Vishnu decides to start his own dance group—Dhongri Dance Revolution (DDR) -- with them, ultimately preparing them to compete in Dance Dil Se. However, the rivalry between the two factions in the group led by D and Rocky leads to multiple issues. Only Rocky and his gang are initially willing to attend the free classes, but D and his friends soon gravitate towards the studio.

They are soon joined by Chandu, a troubled but talented man suffering from drug addiction, Shaina, a bar dancer, and Rhea, a Westerner who was JDC's star dancer but left after Jehangir sexually assaulted her during a "private lesson". Rhea immediately becomes the new star of the group. Though the students are initially skeptical of Shaina because of her profession, Chandu defends her in front of the class. The pair quickly fall for one another.

The two gangs continue to clash, driving Vishnu to his wit's end. However, the students seem to improve and as a reward, he gives them money to buy new speakers. They nearly lose it all when Rhea takes them to dance club where they challenge the resident champions. Vishnu arrives at the last minute and wins back the money. Vishnu is furious, but forgives them. They return to class with greater discipline and drive, only to suddenly be thrown out on the street after D's father calls the cops. The community complains that their children should not be wasting their time on dance. They perform an impromptu dance to convince their families of their talent. However, D's conservative father refuses to accept that his son desires to be a dancer.

The crew head to Dance Dil Se and audition. Jehangir, to humiliate Vishnu publicly, persuades the judges to take the DDR crew on as the show's "jokers." Vishnu asks Rocky and D to do a step that requires mutual trust, but they cannot muster the trust. Vishnu then states that unless the two manage to do the step, none of the dancers would be allowed to go home. D completes the move successfully with Rocky, and the two factions begin to trust each other.

Before the semi-finals, Chandu prepares to propose to Shaina, but he meets his old drug dealer on the street. He refuses to fall back into that world, but the irritated dealer tosses the ring intended for Shaina at him. As Chandu retrieves it, he is hit by a truck and killed, leaving the team devastated. Shaina becomes the centrepiece of the team's semi-final routine. The team and the community come together to cremate Chandu, and DDR resolves to continue in the competition in Chandu's memory. Mayur, a performer in DDR tempted by Jehangir's offer of a main lead role in JDC feeds information to JDC. Faced with losing, DDR crafts a new routine on the spot, based around Lord Ganesha. Their heartfelt and spontaneous performance reminds Jehangir of his old friendship with Vishnu and why they started JDC in the first place and is humbled. The DDR crew are rewarded with a thunderous applause and victory in the competition.

== Cast ==
- Prabhu Deva as Vishnu
- Ganesh Acharya as Gopi
- Kay Kay Menon as Jehangir Khan
- Salman Yusuff Khan as Rocky
- Dharmesh Yelande as Danish "D" Qureshi
- Lauren Gottlieb as Rhea
- Punit Pathak as Chandu
- Noorin Sha as Shaina
- Vrushali Chava as Vrushali
- Bhavana Khanduja as Bhavana
- Paulson Thomas as Pauli
- Prince R Gupta as Biscuit
- Mayuresh Wadkar as Mayur
- Tushar Kalia as a dancer in JDC
- Rahul Shetty as Rahul
- Sushant Pujari as Sushi
- Milind Wagh as Afzal Qureshi, D's father
- Pankaj Tripathi as Vardha Bhai
- Mario Fernando Aguilera as Chris
- Saajan Singh
- Mohena Singh as Competitions dancer in the beginning of the film
- Kishore Aman Shetty
- Karishma Chavan
- Jayant Gadekar as Policeman
- Saroj Khan in "Psycho Re" (Special appearance)
- Remo D'Souza in "Psycho Re" (Special appearance)
- Manish Paul as host of Dance Dil Se (Special appearance)
- Prayas Choudhary as Ghungroo boys
- Sanjay Gurbaxani as Channel Head
- Sajjad Haqi as Sajjad

== Release ==
The film was released on total of 750 screens which included 400 3D screens and 350 2D screens in India. The film's budget (cost of production) is estimated to be between Rs 120–420 million.

== Reception ==
Lisa Tsering praised the film on The Hollywood Reporter as "exuberant, upbeat and overflowing with music". Prasanna D Zore for Rediff.com has given 4/5 stars and says ABCD Any Body Can Dance is a must watch not only for dance lovers but also for those who like good cinema. Taran Adarsh from bollywoodhungama rated the film ABCD 3/5 stars saying, "ABCD's biggest strength lies in the variety of dances that Remo presents to the spectators. On the whole, ABCD has some incredible, eye-popping dances as its soul. While the template may be conventional – the triumph of the underdog – the film has its share of moments that stay with you, especially the concluding portions of the film. Decent watch!" Shivesh Kumar of IndiaWeekly awarded the movie 3 out of 5 stars.

=== Box office ===
ABCD had opening in India of Rs 45 million nett on the first day. It collected approximately Rs 195 million nett at the domestic box office in the first weekend. By the end of its first week, the film has grossed over 312 million nett. The film grossed $425,000 overseas in opening weekend.

== Soundtrack ==
ABCD: Any Body Can Dance

Soundtrack album by Sachin–Jigar
- Released: 4 December 2012
- Genre: Film soundtrack
- Label: Sony Music India
- Producer: Ronnie Screwvala

Sachin–Jigar chronology
Kyaa Super Kool Hain Hum (2012)	ABCD: Any Body Can Dance (2012)	Jayantabhai Ki Luv Story (2013)

The film's music was done by the composer-duo Sachin–Jigar. All songs were written by Mayur Puri apart from "Man Basiyo Saanwariyo" which had lyrics by Priya Panchal.

Although the song "Sun Saathiya" was played as a scratch version in the film, it was reused in the sequel on popular demand and officially became part of its musical-themed soundtrack.

=== Track list ===
No.	Title	Lyrics	Music	Singer(s)	Length
1.	"Shambhu Sutaya"	Mayur Puri	Sachin–Jigar	Shankar Mahadevan, Vishal Dadlani	4:43
2.	"Bezubaan"	Mayur Puri	Sachin – Jigar	Mohit Chauhan, Priya Panchal, Rap By: Tanvi Shah, Deane Sequeira	4:42
3.	"Psycho Re"	Mayur Puri	Sachin – Jigar	Udit Narayan, Mika Singh	4:01
4.	"Chandu Ki Girl Friend"	Mayur Puri	Sachin – Jigar	Raman Mahadevan, Jigar Saraiya, Divya Pushkarna, Sagar Kendurkar, Madhav Krishna	3:16
5.	"Man Basiyo Sawariyo"	Priya Panchaal	Sachin – Jigar	Anushka Manchanda	3:48
6.	"Duhaai"	Mayur Puri	Sachin – Jigar	Madhav Krishna	4:06
7.	"Sorry Sorry"	Mayur Puri	Sachin – Jigar	Jigar Saraiya	3:17
8.	"Kar Ja Re Ya Mar Ja Re Tu"	Mayur Puri	Sachin – Jigar	Suraj Jagan	2:50
9.	"Sadda Dil Vi Tu (Ga Ga Ga Ganpati)"	Mayur Puri	Sachin – Jigar	Hard Kaur	5:27

=== Critical reception ===
The soundtrack received highly positive reviews from critics. IBNLive gave it 3 out of 5 stars and noted, "The duo of Sachin-Jigar has delivered an album that has its moments. 'ABCD' is a versatile album though it falls short of creating an album with viral tracks."

== Sequel ==
The film spawned a sequel titled ABCD 2, which released on 19 June 2015.
