= Abeysinghe =

Abeysinghe is a Sri Lankan last name. It may refer to one of the following people:

- Ashoka Abeysinghe, Sri Lankan politician
- Dilshan Abeysinghe (born 1996), Sri Lankan cricketer
- Hiroshi Abeysinghe (born 1978), Sri Lankan cricketer
- Kamal Abeysinghe, Sri Lankan social entrepreneur
- Kyle Abeysinghe (born 2000), Sri Lankan swimmer
- Matthew Abeysinghe (born 1996), Sri Lankan swimmer
- Nicholas Dias Abeysinghe (1719–1794), Ceylonese Dutch colonial administrator
- Ronnie Abeysinghe (1936–2002), Sri Lankan civil servant
- Roshan Abeysinghe (born 1963), Sri Lankan businessperson
- Tilake Abeysinghe (1929–2022), Sri Lankan painter
