= Kamal Khan =

Kamal Khan may refer to:

== People ==
- Kamal Khan (character), a character in the 1983 James Bond film Octopussy
- Kamal Khan (singer) (born 1989), Indian Bollywood playback singer
- Kamal Khan Gakhar (died 1566), Mughal general and chief of the Gakhar clan
- Kamal Khan-Magomedov (born 1986), Russian judoka
- Kamal Khan Rustami, poet in the Sultanate of Bijapur
- Kamal Khan Zadran (born 1974), Afghan member of a prominent family

== See also ==
- Kamala Khan, a Marvel Comics superheroine
- Kamal Khan Dam, in Afghanistan
