= Kamal Singh =

Kamal Singh may refer to:

== People ==
- Kamal Singh (dancer), Indian ballet dancer
- Kamal Singh (Guyanese cricketer) (born 1955), Guyanese cricketer
- Kamal Singh (Indian cricketer) (born 2000), Indian cricketer
- Kamal Singh (politician) (1926–2019), Indian politician from Bihar
- Kamal Singh Airee (born 2000), Nepalese cricketer
- Kamal Singh Dao, Indian independence activist
- Kamal Singh Malik (born 1966), Indian politician
- Kamal Singh Narzary, Indian politician
- Kamal Singh Saroha (born 1995), Indian sports executive and administrator
- Kamal Jit Singh, Indian Army officer
- Kamal Narain Singh (1926–2022), Indian jurist
