= Kemal =

Kemal may refer to:

People

- Mustafa Kemal Atatürk, a Turkish politician and the first president of Turkey
- Kemal (name), a Turkish name

Places

- Kemalpaşa, İzmir Province, Turkey
- Mustafakemalpaşa, Bursa Province, Turkey

See also

- "Kemal", a Greek song by Manos Hatzidakis and Nikos Gatsos
