= Black Software =

2019 non-fiction book by Charlton McIlwain

- Author: Charlton McIlwain
- Language: English
- Genre: Nonfiction
- Published: 2019
- Publisher: Oxford University Press
- Publication place: USA
- ISBN: 9780190863845

Black Software: The Internet and Racial Justice, From the Afronet to Black Lives Matter is a 2019 American book that sets out to understand Black Lives Matter through the six-decade history of racial justice movement organizing online.

== Overview ==
Charlton McIlwain is an American academic and author whose expertise includes the role of race and media in politics and social life. McIlwain is Professor of media, culture, and communication and is the Vice Provost for Faculty Engagement and Development at New York University.

Dr. McIlwain is the author of multiple books, including Black Software: The Internet and Racial Justice, From the Afronet to Black Lives Matter, which has been widely reviewed.

"McIlwain has written the first digital history book that explains in crystal clear terms exactly how Big Tech came to be an engine for inequality. Black Software is an utterly fascinating, painstakingly researched origin story of black cyberculture...It will change the way you think about computers, fairness, racial identity, and America as a technological nation."

— Lisa Nakamura, Gwendolyn Calvert Baker Collegiate Professor and Director the Digital Studies Institute, University of Michigan, Ann Arbor

"Black Software imaginatively reprograms late-twentieth-century digital history with a revelatory account of the black men and women who are its hidden figures. Unsung innovators are recovered as the forerunners of #BlackLivesMatter, #BlackTwitter, and #MeToo in this detailed, creative, and crucial rendering of the tech communities that against both the odds and countervailing forces-inspired today's hashtag politics."

— Alondra Nelson, Harold F. Linder Professor of Social Science, Institute for Advanced Study

Black Software has been nominated for the MAAA Stone Book Award.

== See also ==
- Kamal Al-Mansour
- AfroNet
