= P. Amarasinghe =

- Born: Colombo Sri Lanka
- Died: 1 August 2007; Colombo
- Education: Nalanda College Colombo; University of Ceylon; McMaster University Canada; McGill University Canada
- Occupation: Economist

P. Amarasinghe was the former deputy governor of Central Bank of Sri Lanka and former chairman of People's Bank (Sri Lanka).

== Early childhood and education ==
After being educated at Nalanda College, Colombo Amarasinghe entered University of Ceylon and graduated with an Economics Degree with Honours. Later on obtained MSc in Economics from McMaster University in Canada. He is also a fellow of McGill University Canada Centre for Developing Area Studies, Fellow of Institute of Bankers of Sri Lanka.

== Career ==
After graduation Amerasinghe joined Central Bank of Sri Lanka as an economist. During his tenure, he had serverved as senior economist of economic research, director data processing superintendent of public debt, controller of exchange and an executive director.

P. Amarasinghe has also served as chairman of the Institute of Bankers and the Credit Information Bureau of Sri Lanka.
