= Kamal ad-Din =

Kamal ad-Din (Arabic: كمال‌ الدين, Kamāl ad-Dīn) is a male Muslim given name or surname (laqab in Arabic), meaning "perfection of the religion" in Arabic.

The name is formed from the elements kamāl (كمال‌), al- (الـp), and dīn (دين). It is often transliterated as Kamāl al-Dīn, but because the letter dāl (د, d) is a sun letter, the lām (ل, l) of al- assimilates into the first letter of dīn in pronunciation, resulting in a doubled consonant.

In Classical Arabic the pronunciation of the name changes depending on its function. Thus, the nominative case of the name is Kamaluddin (Kamālu’d-Dīn), the accusative case is Kamaladdin (Kamāla’d-Dīn), and the genitive case is Kamaliddin (Kamāli’d-Dīn).

== People ==
- Kamal al-Din ibn al-Humam (1388–1457), Hanafi Maturidi scholar
- Kamal al-Din ibn al-Adim (1192–1262), Arab historian
- Kamal al-Din Gurg (died 1315/16), Delhi Sultanate general
- Kamāl al-Dīn al-Fārisī (1267–1318), Persian physicist and mathematician
- Kamaleddin Khojandi, or Kamal Khujandi (1320–1400), Persian poet
- Kamal al-Din Muhammad ibn Musa Al-Damiri (1344–1405), Egyptian writer on canon law and natural history
- Kamal ud-Din of Sulu (died 1505), Sultan of Sulu
- Kamāl ud-Dīn Behzād (1450–1535), painter of Persian miniatures
- Ahmed Kemaleddin, known as Kemal Reis (1451–1511), Turkish privateer and Ottoman admiral
- Mimar Kemaleddin Bey (1870–1927), Turkish architect
- Khwaja Kamal-ud-Din (1870–1932), Indian lawyer and religious writer
- Prince Kamal el Dine Hussein (1874–1932), son of Sultan Hussein Kamel of Egypt
- Kemalettin Sami Gökçen (1882–1934), officer of the Ottoman Army and general of the Turkish Army
- Kamaloddin Jenab (1908–2006), Iranian physicist
- Kamal el-Din Hussein (1921–1999), one of the Egyptian Free Officers who overthrew King Farouk
- Kamaluddin Muhamad, later known as Keris Mas, (1922–1992), Malaysian writer
- Kamaluddin Ahmed (politician) (1930–2018), Indian politician
- Kamaluddin Ahmed (physicist) (1939–2014), Pakistani physicist
- Mohammed Hasan Kamaluddin (born 1941), Bahraini politician, diplomat, poet and historian
- Kamal Uddin Siddiqui (1945–2025), Bangladeshi scientist and economist
- Kamaluddin Mohammed (born 1957), Malayali Indian film director
- Kamaladdin Heydarov (born 1961), Azerbaijani composer and politician
- Kamaluddin Azfar (1930–2025), Pakistani politician (PPP)
- Kemalettin Şentürk (born 1970), Turkish footballer
- Kamalludin Kasimbekov (born 1977), Uzbek held in Guantanamo
- Kamalutdin Akhmedov (born 1986), Russian footballer
- Kamal Uddin (politician), Pakistani politician (MMA)
- Kamolidin Tashiyev (born 2000), Kyrgyzstani footballer
