= Charlton McIlwain =

American academic and author (born 1971)

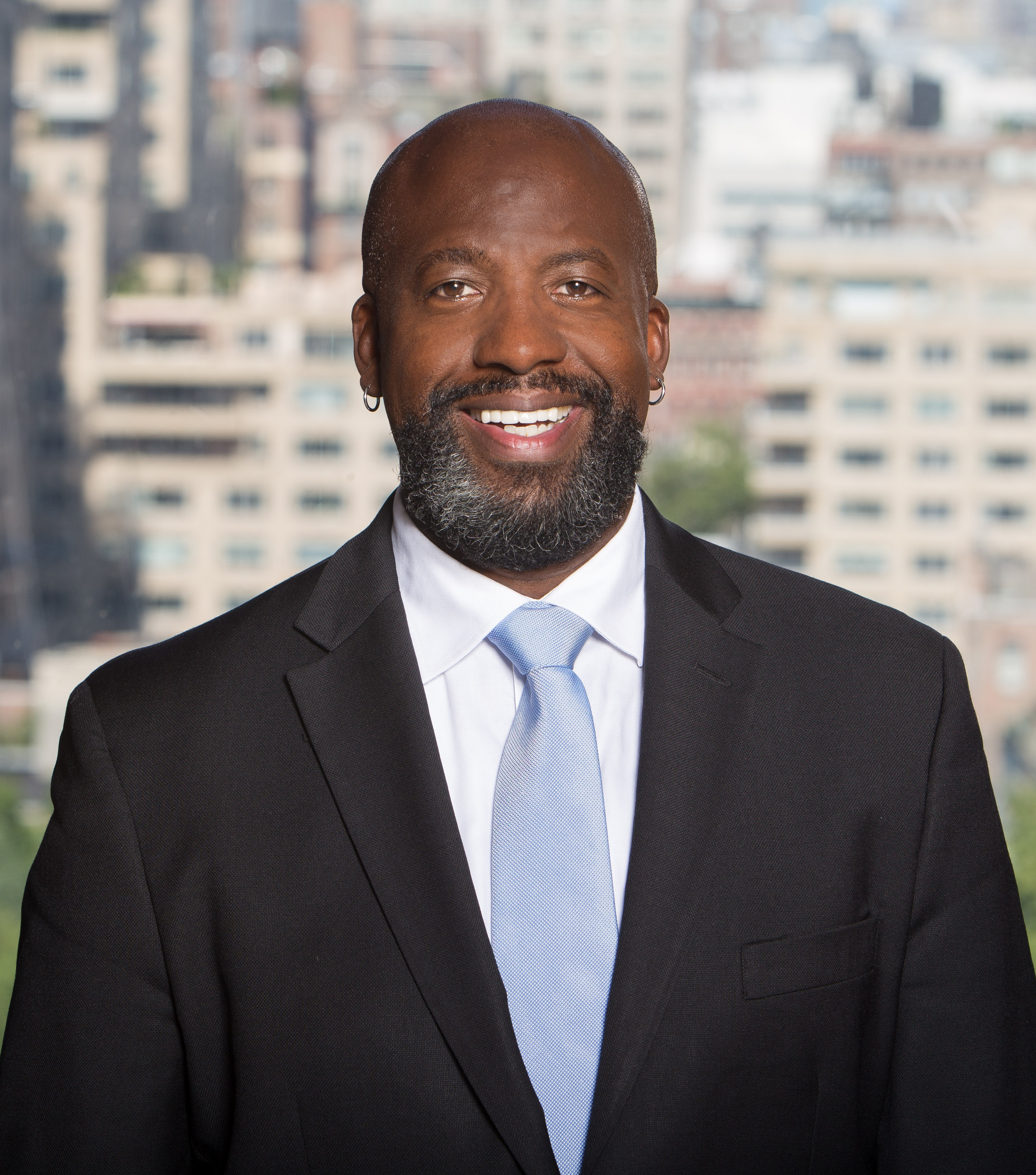
- Born: 1971 (age 54–55)
- Spouse: Raechel Lee Adams (m. 2007)

Academic background
- Education: Oklahoma Baptist University (BA); University of Oklahoma (MA),(PhD)
- Website: charltonmcilwain.com

Charlton Deron McIlwain (born 1971) is an American academic and author whose expertise includes the role of race and media in politics and social life. McIlwain is Professor of media, culture, and communication and is the Vice Provost for Faculty Engagement and Development at New York University.

== Early life and education ==
Charlton Deron McIlwain was born in 1971 to Annie and Ronald McIlwain of Charlotte.

McIlwain completed a Bachelor of Arts in family psychology at Oklahoma Baptist University in 1994. He earned a Master of Human Relations from University of Oklahoma. In 2001, he earned a doctor of philosophy in communication from the same institution.

== Career ==
McIlwain joined the faculty of NYU in 2001, where he is now Professor of Media, Culture, and Communication and Vice Provost for Faculty Engagement and Development.

== Selected works ==
He is the author of multiple books, including Black Software: The Internet and Racial Justice, From the Afronet to Black Lives Matter, and Race Appeal: How Candidates Invoke Race in U.S. Political Campaigns from Temple Books (with Stephen M. Caliendo), and editor of The Routledge Companion to Race & Ethnicity in 2010, also with Caliendo. He is the author of multiple scholarly articles, and wrote both When Death Goes Pop: Death, Media and the Remaking of Community in 2005, and Death in Black & White: Death, Ritual & Family Ecology in 2003. McIlwain is a Delphi Fellow at Big Think and an Advisor to Data + Society.

== Personal life ==
In 2007, McIlwain married trial lawyer, Raechel Lee Adams in Washington, D.C. The ceremony was led by officiant Ellen Dinerman of the Northern Virginia Ethical Society.
