= Kemal (name) =

Kemal, also archaically spelt Kamâl, is a Turkish and Bosnian male given name of Arabic origin meaning integrity, perfection, maturity. It is derived from the Arabic name Kamal and commonly used in Turkey and Bosnia and Herzegovina.

== Different spellings ==
- Kamel, Kemel

== Given name ==
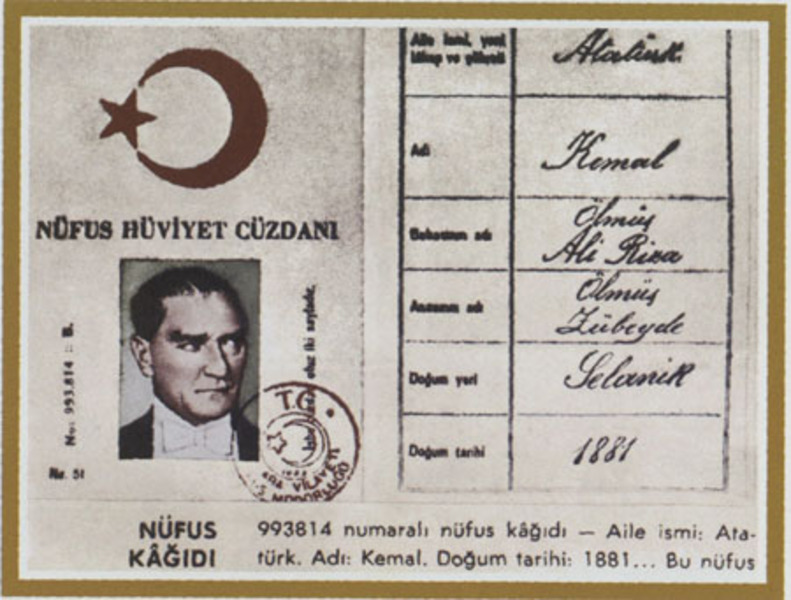
Kemal Atatürk's identity card with serial number 993 814

=== First name ===
- Kemal Akbaba (born 1988), Turkish football player
- Kemal Alispahić (born 1969), Bosnian footballer
- Kemal Alomerović (born 1980), Macedonian football player
- Kemal Bedri, Ethiopian politician
- Kemal Arıkan (1927–1982), Turkish diplomat assassinated by an Armenian group in Los Angeles, United States
- Kemal Aslan (born 1981), Turkish football player
- Kemal Başar (born 1963), Turkish theatre director
- Kemal Bilmez (born 1994), Belgian politician of Turkish descent
- Kemal Bokhary (born 1947), Hong Kong judge
- Kemal Bourhani (born 1981), French footballer of Comorian descent
- Kemal Curić (born 1978), Bosnian automobile designer
- Kemal Derviş (1949–2023), Turkish economist and politician
- Kemal Dinçer (born 1963), Turkish basketball player
- Kemal Faruki (1906–1988), Turkish footballer
- Kemal Gekić (born 1962), American classical pianist of Bosnian ancestry
- Kemal Güleş (born 1999), Turkish amputee footballer
- Kemal Horulu (1926–1991), Turkish sprinter and pornographic film director
- Kemal Arda Gürdal (born 1990), Turkish swimmer
- Kemal Idris (1923–2010), Indonesian Army general
- Kemal Izzet (born 1980), English footballer of Turkish Cypriot ethnicity
- Kemal Karpat (1924–2019), Turkish historian
- Kemal Kaya Effendi, Turkish military officer
- Kemal Kayhan (born 1983), Turkish volleyball player
- Kemal Kerinçsiz (born 1960), Turkish lawyer and political activist
- Kemal Kıvanç Elgaz (born 1986), Turkish volleyball player
- Kemal Kılıçdaroğlu (born 1948), Turkish politician
- Kemal Kirişci, Turkish academic and political scientist
- Kemal Koyuncu (born 1985), Turkish athlete
- Kemal Kozarić (born 1956), Bosnian banker
- Kemal Küçükbay (born 1982), Turkish cyclist
- Kemal Kurspahić (1946–2021), Bosnian journalist
- Kemal Kurt (1947–2002), German author and translator of Turkish descent
- Kemal Malovčić (born 1946), Bosnian singer
- Kemal Monteno (1948–2015), Bosnian singer
- Kemal Okyay (born 1985), Turkish footballer
- Kemal Reis (1451–1511), Ottoman privateer and admiral
- Kemal Rijken (born 1980), Dutch historian
- Kemal Satır (1911–1991), Turkish physician and politician
- Kemal Sunal (1944–2000), Turkish actor
- Kemal Şahin (born 1955), Turkish entrepreneur
- Kemal Tahir (1910–1973), Turkish author and intellectual
- Kemal Tokak (born 1989), Turkish footballer
- Kemal Türkler (1926–1980), Turkish labor union leader
- Kemal Unakıtan (1946–2016), Turkish politician
- Kemal Zeytinoğlu (1911–1959), Turkish engineer and politician

=== Middle name ===
- Ali Kemal Bey (1867–1922), Turkish journalist and politician
- Derviş Kemal Deniz (born 1954), Turkish-Cypriot minister of economy and tourism
- Mehmet Kemal Ağar (born 1951), Turkish politician
- Mustafa Kemal Atatürk (1881–1938), the founder and first President of Turkey
- Mustafa Kemal Kurdaş (1920–2011), Turkish economist and politician
- Namık Kemal Yolga (1914–2001), Turkish diplomat
- Namık Kemal Zeybek (born 1944), Turkish politician
- Orhan Kemal Cengiz, Turkish lawyer, journalist and human rights activist
- Yahya Kemal Beyatlı (1884–1958), Turkish writer

== Surname ==
- Ismail Kemal (1844–1919), Albanian founding father and prime minister
- Kara Kemal (1875–1926), Turkish politician
- György Ekrem-Kemál (1946–2009), Hungarian nationalist politician
- Mariz Kemal (born 1950), Russian poet
- Namık Kemal (1840–1888), Turkish writer

=== Pseudonym ===
- Orhan Kemal (1914–1970), Turkish writer
- Yaşar Kemal (1923–2015), Turkish writer of Kurdish origin
