= Ranee Jayamaha =

Sri Lankan banker and economist

Chairperson of Hatton National Bank
- Incumbent
- Assumed office March 2011

Personal details
- Profession: Banker, Economist and Author

Ranee Jayamaha (also spelt as Rani Jayamaha) is a Sri Lankan economist, author and banker. She served as the chairperson of Hatton National Bank from 2011 to 2015. In addition, she is currently an advisor to the President of Sri Lanka in Banking and a former Deputy Governor of the Central Bank of Sri Lanka (2004–2009). She has also served as a member of the Insurance Board of Sri Lanka and a member of Securities and Exchange Commission.

== Career ==
Jayamaha was born in Colombo, Sri Lanka and received a BA in Banking from the University of Peradeniya, Sri Lanka in 1970, a Masters in Economics from the University of Stirling, UK in 1976 and a PhD in Monetary Economics from the University of Bradford, UK in 1989. She joined the Central Bank of Sri Lanka upon graduation and rose to the rank of Deputy Governor in 2004. She retired from the Central Bank in May 2009 and was subsequently appointed chairperson of the Hatton National Bank, one of the largest private banks in Sri Lanka.

In November 2012, the University of Stirling recognized Jayamaha with the degree of Doctor of the University (DUniv) in recognition of her career as one of the university's first masters graduates in economics and as a person of distinction in the fields of Economics, Banking and Public Affairs. She became the honorary fellow of the Institute of Bankers of Sri Lanka during the 13th annual convocation of the institute on 24 October 2008.

From 2004 until her retirement in 2009, Jayamaha was deputy governor in charge of financial system stability of the Central Bank of Sri Lanka. She has over 45 years of experience in the fields of economics, banking, finance, payment systems, regulation and administration, having held a number of positions at the Central Bank and other international institutions.

During her tenure as the deputy governor of the Central Bank, she served as chairperson of the Financial Stability Committee of the Bank, the Credit Information Bureau of Sri Lanka, the National Payments Council Legal Forum, SAARC Payment Council, and Safeguard Assessment Committee of the Bank.

In 2014, Jayamaha published a book, The Money Pipeline, which focuses on national payment systems with an emphasis on payment systems in Asia, particularly Sri Lanka.

She was appointed as one of the non executive directors of the HNB Bank with effect from 31 March 2011. She announced that she would resign as chairperson of HNB on 27 March 2015 and tendered her resignation at the bank's annual general meeting on 30 March 2015. During her tenure as HNB chairperson, the bank recorded huge profits and gained popularity as a systematically important bank in the financial system.

In 2012, she was appointed as the chairperson of HNB Assurance.

On 24 June 2020, she was appointed as one of the non-executive board members of the Central Bank of Sri Lanka by President Gotabaya Rajapaksa.

== Positions ==
- Secretary to the Presidential Commission on Finance & Banking
- Advisor to the Financial Sector Reform Committee, Ministry of Finance
- Special Advisor (Economic), Commonwealth Secretariat, London, UK
- Member of the Global Payments Forum
- Member of the Advisory Panel of G-8 Remittances Working Group
- Member of the Expert Panel of Safeguard Assessment Policy Review 2010, IMF

== Awards ==
- Assert Award of the British Council (1994)
- Outstanding Service Award by the Central Bank of Sri Lanka (2002)
- Outstanding Contribution to the Banking Industry Award by the Association of Professional Bankers, Sri Lanka (2010)
