= Kamal Ahmed =

Kamal Ahmed is the name of:

- Kamal Ahmed (comedian) (born 1966), American comedian
- Kamal Ahmed (British journalist) (born 1967)
- Kamal Ahmed (Bangladeshi journalist)
- Kamal Ahmed (politician), Bahraini politician
- Kamal Ahmed (singer) (born 1965), Bangladeshi singer
- Kamal Ahmed (director) (born 1935), Bangladeshi director
- Kamal Ahmed (music director) (1937–1993), Pakistani music director

== See also ==
- Kamal Ahmed Majumder (born 1950), Bangladeshi politician
- Kamal Ahmed Rizvi (1930–2015), Pakistani actor and playwright
- Kamal Ahmad (born 1965), American lawyer
