= Tope Olarinoye Olayonu =

Nigerian politician (born 1983)

The Honourable Tope Olarinoye Olayonu

Member of the House of Representatives (Nigeria) from Offa Local Government
- Constituency: Offa/Oyun/Ifelodun

Personal details
- Born: 27 March 1983 (age 43) Offa,Offa Local Government Kwara State Nigeria
- Party: Peoples Democratic Party (Nigeria)
- Education
- Occupation: Politician

Tope Olarinoye Olayonu Pronounciation (born 2 March 1983) is a Nigerian politician representing the Offa/Oyun/Ifelodun Federal constituency from Kwara State in the 8th Assembly. He contested and won the Peoples Democratic Party (Nigeria) (PDP) House of Representatives (Nigeria) ticket in 2015 and won his seat during the 2015 general election. Prior to his election as Federal house of Representative member in 2015 he previously served as 7th Kwara State House of Assembly member representing Ojomu/Balogun constituency at the state assembly.
