= Kamal Singh (dancer) =

Indian ballet dancer

- Citizenship: Indian
- Education: Vaganova Academy of Russian Ballet; English National Ballet
- Occupation: ballet dancer
- Years active: 2019 - present

Kamal Singh is an Indian ballet dancer.

Singh began practicing ballet in Indian public parks the age of seventeen. He was admitted to the Vaganova Academy of Russian Ballet in 2019, where he performed as a soloist at a Gayaneh dance and as principal dancer in Swan Lake and The Nutcraker. In 2020, he became one of the first Indian person to join the English National Ballet school, after being helped by his mentor Fernando Aguilera.
