= Institute of Bankers of Sri Lanka =

Governing body of Sri Lankan banking education

- Type: Bankers training institute
- Established: 1964
- Affiliations: Central Bank of Sri Lanka
- Location: Colombo, Sri Lanka
- Campus: Colombo Head Office
- Website: www.ibsl.lk

The Institute of Bankers of Sri Lanka (IBSL) is a professional apex body of banking education in Sri Lanka. It is one of the prominent institutes which carry out banking courses for the students and it is closely associated with Central Bank of Sri Lanka. The institute was formally established as the Bankers' Training Institute in 1964 by the Central Bank of Sri Lanka. Bankers' Training Institute was reincorporated in 1979 as Institute of Bankers of Sri Lanka under the provisions of Parliament Act no 26 of 1979.

The institute is managed by a governing board of 12 high-ranking banking sector professionals including two members from CBSL. The purpose of the institute is to provide education in banking and finance for banking and non-banking personnel. The chairman of IBSL is the Deputy Governor of the CBSL. IBSL provides membership of the institute in five categories including Honorary Fellows, Fellows (life), Associate (life) Members, Associate Members and Student Members (Active).

== Notable alumni ==
- Visna Fernando - beauty pageant contestant
- P. Amarasinghe - former CBSL governor
- Kamal Abeysinghe - banker and social activist
- Ranee Jayamaha - banker, economist and author
