= Kamal Ibrahim =

Kamal Ibrahim may refer to:

- Kamal Ibrahim (soccer) (born 1992), Australian soccer player
- Kamal Ibrahim (presenter) (born 1985), Irish television presenter and model
- Kamal Ibrahim (wrestler), Egyptian Olympic wrestler
