= Kamal Sido =

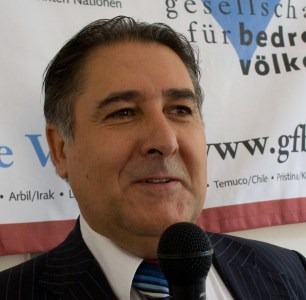
- Kamal Sido in 2011
- Born: Kamal Sido Kurdaxi; 1961 (age 64–65); Syria
- Education: Institute of Oriental Studies of the Russian Academy of Sciences
- Occupations: Translator, interpreter, author
- Writing career
- Language: Kurdish, Arabic, Russian, German, and Turkish

Kamal Sido Kurdaxi (born 1961) is a Kurdish interpreter, translator, and author of several publications in Kurdish, Arabic, Russian, German, and Turkish.

== Early life and education ==
Sido was born in 1961 in the Kurdish region of Syria. In 1980, after graduating from high school, he moved to Moscow, Russia, where he focused on history and Oriental studies. In 1989, he earned his Ph.D. in History from the Institute of Oriental Studies of the Russian Academy of Sciences.

== Career ==
Sido has served as consultant for the Society for Threatened Peoples (STP) in Göttingen, Germany, since 2006. He is an interpreter and sworn translator for Kurdish (Kurmanci and Sorani, Arabic and Russian). For several years, Sido has been politically active in the German Free Democratic Party (FDP) and was head of the Ausländerbeirat in Marburg between 2003 and 2006. From 1990 to 2006, Sido lived and worked in Marburg, Hesse, in the Federal Republic of Germany.

== Published works ==
- Rusiya û Pirsa Rojhilat di hîstoriografiya ereb, tirk, fars û kurdan de, 16 r. (rûsî)
- (Peywendiyên rûs û kurdan ji 1853 –1917), Moskva, 1986.?128 s. (rûsî)
- Liqa mah al-alima alä-asovyetie al-muchtasa fi etnografiet al?akrad T.F. Aristova, Gel, Nr.14, adar 1985, r. 4. (erebî)
- Safahat min altarich alqadim: Alembaratoria almidia, Gel, Nr. 37, 1986.r.3 (erebî)
- Waqfa mah al-profesor al-kurdi al-asovyeti Haci Cundi, Gel, Nr.20, 1986, r. 4.(erebî)
- Alqadia alkurdia min wghat nadar Islamia, di : Cudi, Nr. 2, 1990, Ann Arbor, MI, USA. r. 9?14 (erebî)
- Ez gazî xûşk û birayên xwe dikim: kurd li Ermemnistanê, Riya Teze, 6. adar 1991, Yêrêvan, r. 4 (kurdî)
- Wa intahat um almaarek, di: Dengê xwendevan, Nr. 4., 1991, Sofia, r. 4 (erebî).
- Al-garaed al-arabia wa dihaya al-muadiya lil qadia alkurdia, Cudî, Nr. 4, 1991, Ann Arbor MI, USA. r. 3?17. (erebî)
- Sovjet Kürdleri, di: Cudî, Nr. 6, tebax 1991, Bochum, S. 39?40. (tirkî).
- Die Kurden in der ehemaligen Sowjetunion: Ihre Zukunft ist ungewiss. Pogrom Nr. 164. März/April 1992, Göttingen. S. 49?51. (almanî)
- Chend keser ji dervayî welat, helbest, Druck, Satz & Verlag. GmbH Marburg 1992. 74 r. (kurdî).
- Riya azadiyê: Kushtina Musa Enter, Welat Nr. 73. tîrmeh 1993, Istanbul. (kurdî)
- Pêşketina civaka Kurdistan û azadiya neteweyî, Welat Nr. 83, îlon 1993, Istanbul. (kurdî).
- Konferenz in Krasnodar:zur Situation der Kurden in GUS-Republiken, Pogrom Nr. 174, Dez. 93/ Jan.94, Göttingen. S. 49. (almanî)
- Ji dîroka kêmnetew û olên Kurdistanê: cihû û cihûtî., Welat, Nr.102, 1994. r. 12.(kurdî)
- Sprachführer Kurdisch, Blaue Hörner Verlag, Marburg 1994, 144 Seiten + Kassette. (almanî)
- Al-dschalia al-yahudia al-kurdustania wa qadiat aschab al-kurdi attahruria, Sawt Kurdistan, Nr. 26, 1996, STYER; ÖSTERREICH. r. 14?15. (erebî)
- Israeldeki Kürdistanli Yahudiler Camaati ve kürt halkinin kurtuluş mücadelisi, Özgür POLITIKA, 31.1. 1996, Isenburg. (tirkî)
- Di navbera kurd û tirkan de, Israîl dikare qasidiya aştiyê bike, Israeli Kurdish Friendship League, AZ. WELAT; Nr. 54, 1997, Istanbul, S. 6. (kurdî)
- General H. von Moltke li Kurdistanê, Az. WELAT; Nr. 84, 6-12 îlonê. 1997, Istanbul, r. 8-9. (kurdi)
- Bi çavên Moltke Romkela, Bêreçûk, Riha, Az. WELAT; Nr. 97, 6-12 berfanbar. 1997, Istanbul, r. 4-5. (kurdî)
- Rusiya û Pirsa Rojhilat di hîstorîografiya welatên rojhilata nêzîk û navîn de (dawiya sedsala 17. heta salên heftiyî sedsala 19.), Blaue Hörner Verlag, 1996 Marburg. (rusî) kurtenaverok bi almanî û înglîzî. ISBN 978-3-926385-23-9

== Sources ==
- „Ich dachte, die ganze Welt spricht Kurdisch“, Lebensgeschichten der kurdischen Migranten, von Memo Şahin, mit einem Geleitwort von Prof. Dr. Udo Steinach, Pro Humanitate 2013, ISBN 3-933884-12-8 (in German)
