= Kamal Khudaverdiyev =

Kamal Khudaverdiyev Kamal Xudaverdiyev
- Born: 3 May 1938; Baku, Azerbaijan SSR, USSR
- Died: 23 April 2008 (aged 69); Baku, Azerbaijan
- Occupation: Actor

Kamal Aghahuseyn oghlu Khudaverdiyev (Azerbaijani: Kamal Ağahüseyn oğlu Xudaverdiyev, May 3, 1928 – April 23, 2008) was an Azerbaijani actor, People's Artiste of Azerbaijan (1991).

== Biography ==
Kamal Khudaverdiyev was born on May 3, 1938, in Baku. Kamal Khudaverdiyev, who completed his higher education in 1965, was accepted into the troupe on October 1 at the suggestion of Tofig Kazimov, the chief director of the Academic National Drama Theatre. Except for a short break in between, he worked only in this theater.

In addition to the theater, the actor played many characters in the performances of the Azerbaijan State Television, and played different characters in the films made by the "Azerbaijanfilm" studio in different years.

Kamal Khudaverdiyev died on April 23, 2008.

== Awards ==
- People's Artiste of Azerbaijan — May 22, 1991
- Honored Artist of the Azerbaijan SSR — 1982
