= Ilham Namig Kamal =

Azerbaijani Actor (Born:1949)

Ilham Ahmadov İlham Əhmədov
- Born: 9 January 1949 (age 77); Baku, Azerbaijan SSR
- Citizenship: Azerbaijan
- Occupations: Actor, Director
- Years active: 1968–present
- Awards: People's Artist of Azerbaijan Honored Art Worker of the Azerbaijan SSR "Senetkar" Award Shohrat Order

Ilham Namig Kamal oghlu Ahmadov (Azerbaijani: İlham Namiq Kamal oğlu Əhmədov; 9 January 1949), better known as Ilham Namig Kamal (Azerbaijani: İlham Namiq Kamal) is an Azerbaijani actor, director, and director of the "Ilham" Miniature Theatre, People's Artist of Azerbaijan.

== Biography ==
Ilham Ahmadov was born on 9 January 1949 in Baku. In 1966 he joined the Faculty of Drama and Cinema of the Azerbaijan State Theater Institute named after Mirzaaga Aliyev. Adil Isgandarov and Rza Tahmasib were his teachers. His first role was "Jorj Danden" of Jan Batist Molier when he was a student. He was then accepted to the troupe of university on December 16, 1968. Ilham Ahmadov played "Mirza Javad", "Schwester", "Lomov", "Molla Sabzali" and other roles in troupe.

He worked in Azerbaijan State Theatre of Young Spectators from 25 November 1971 to 2 February 1972. From 3 February he worked in Azerbaijan State Academic National Drama Theatre. On 20 March 1989, Ilham Ahmadov joined the Youth Theater organized by a talented young director, Huseynaga Atakishiyev. Since 26 January 1993 the collective has been operating as the Azerbaijan State Youth Theater. Ilham Namig Kamal worked with this collective for 4 years.

While he was working in the State Youth Theater, he also acted at the Azerbaijan State Theatre of Musical Comedy in 1989-1991. On 14 June 1993 he left the troupe and established his own miniature theater "Ilham". Since 1995 Ilham Ahmadov has been teaching at Azerbaijan State University of Culture and Art, Head of the Variety Art Department. He has 4 children: Gumru, Gumral, Ulvi, Ziya.

On 25 June 2013 he was awarded the Order of Glory (Shohrat Order). On 10 March 2014 he was awarded the Order of the Artist, established by the Union of Theater Artists of Azerbaijan. Ilham Namig Kamal is the brother of actor Jafar Namig Kamal.

== Filmography ==
- Coast of Memories (1972)
- Golden goose (1972)
- Aghasadig Garaybayli (1974)
- Activity (1975)
- Comfortable place in the garden (1978)
- Mother-in-law (1978)
- Hotel owner (1978)
- In workshop No.777 (1979)
- Strange man (1979)
- We invite you to a circumcision ceremony (1979)
- Ujar anecdote (1981)
- The life of Uzeyir (1981)
- A transverse house of darling (1982)
- On the go (1983)
- Holy oath (1983)
- Music teacher (1983)
- Men (1979)
- Condition (1984)
- 100 (1985)
- Groom kidnapping (1985)
- The window of grief (1986)
- The magic lamp (1987)
- An actor's theater (1988)
- Excursion (1991)
- The case No.777 (1992)
- Necrologist (2001)
- Shooting is postponed!.. (2002)
- Chance (2004)
- Be a man! (2005)
- Nobility lesson (2007)
- A skyscraper house of darling (2010)
