= Kamal al-Shawish =

Yemeni human rights activist

Kamal al-Shawish (Arabic: كمال الشويش) is a Yemeni human rights activist who was kidnapped by the Houthi militia in August 2018 in the city of Hodeidah.

Shawish is a researcher for Mwatana Organization for Human Rights in Hodeidah, where he was reporting on human rights violations against civilians.

Mwatana released a statement that Shawish had been detained on Sanaa Street when "two-armed men blindfolded Al Shawish and pulled him towards a gold-color car taking him to an unknown location". Middle East Monitor noted that Mwatana had been particularly targeted, and Executive Director Abdulrasheed Al-Faqih and Chairperson Radhya Al-Mutawakel had both been temporarily detained in June 2018.

Amnesty International's Lynn Maalouf commented that “The worrying abduction of Kamal al-Shawish seems to be part of a sinister pattern of harassment and repression of human rights work in Yemen, committed by all sides to the conflict”. The Gulf Center for Human Rights also called on the Houthi militia to release al-Shawish.

Kamal was repeatedly arrested, as the Houthis arrested him earlier, along with 3 of his colleagues, from the yard of the Media Department at Hodeidah University, while they were producing a humanitarian TV program in Hodeidah. The International Federation of Journalists condemned their arrest by the Houthis in March 2017.

AlShawish is active in publishing and press production for the media, and in early February 2015 he received a threat of physical liquidation through two phone calls after a report was published revealing corruption cases in a government office in Raymah Governorate. [6]
