= Kamal Mokdad =

General Manager of Banque Centrale Populaire

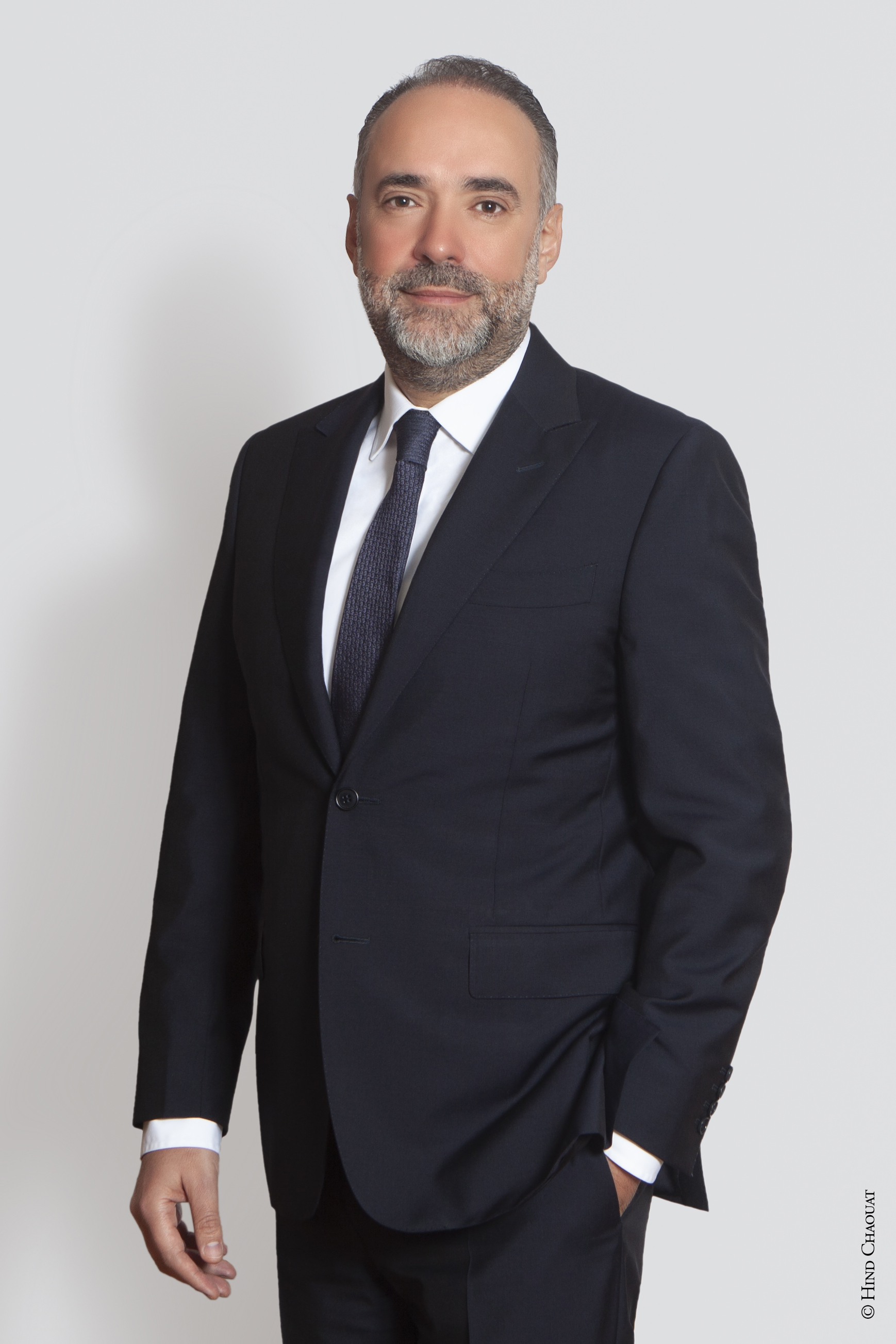
- Mokdad in 2018
- Born: May 7, 1974 (age 51); Meknes, Morocco
- Education: Paris Institute of Political Studies
- Occupation: Banker
- Known for: General Manager of Banque Populaire du Maroc

Kamal Mokdad is a Moroccan banker who is the general manager of Banque Centrale Populaire of Morocco. He is also the head of International Global Banking and the chief executive officer of BCP Consulting.

He was the former managing partner and financial services leader at an international audit firm, Mazars in Morocco from 2010 to 2016.

On June 18, 2020, he was appointed chairman of the Board of Directors of the Casablanca Stock Exchange. He also acts as director on the boards of several financial institutions in Morocco, France, Italy, and Subsaharan-Africa.

== Early life and education ==
Born and raised in Meknes, Mokdad pursued his studies at the Institute of Political Studies in Paris (Sciences Po Paris) where he earned a degree in economics and finance, as well as an international certificate of political studies. He also received the designation of chartered accountant in 2006 and obtained a master's of business administration degree in 2014.

== Professional career ==
In 1998, Mokdad started his career in Paris at Mazars. In 2007, he was appointed as a partner in Mazars Moroccan office and was in charge of leading the transition from the firm's founding partner as well as launching a new financial services offer. By 2010, he was entrusted with the management of the firm as he became Morocco's managing partner and financial services leader in Africa. By 2010, he became Mazars' managing partner for Morocco.

By early 2017, he was nominated general manager at Banque Centrale Populaire. He is currently general manager of BCP in Morocco and in charge of developing BCP abroad.

In early 2019, Mokdad is entrusted, in addition to the International Banking, Moroccan activities of Banque Centrale Populaire.

On June 18, 2020, he was appointed chairman of the Board of Directors of the Casablanca Stock Exchange.

== Other positions ==
Mokdad is considered a specialist of finance in Africa.

Mokdad is the chairman of the board of different banks and insurance companies belonging to the BCP group in Africa. He is also a director of several financial institutions in Morocco, France, Italy and sub-Saharan Africa.

== Recognition ==
- 2017: identified by the New African magazine among the most influential personalities of the year 2017 in Africa.
- 2018: BCP's acquisition of the four African banking subsidiaries of the French BPCE group, led by Mokdad, was voted "Deal of the Year" by the 2018 edition of the "Financial Afrik Awards" in Abidjan.
- 2020: for the second time, he was in the Financial Afrik's list of the most influential people that transforms Africa.
- 2021: in the 2021 edition of the Financial Afrik Award, Mokdad was nominated Financial person of the Year
