= Razak Atunwa =

Nigerian politician

Member of the House of Representatives
- In office 2015–2019
- Constituency: Asa/Ilorin West Federal Constituency

Personal details
- Born: 17 October 1969 (age 56) Kwara State, Nigeria
- Party: All Progressives Congress
- Occupation: Politician

Razak Atunwa is a Nigerian politician. He served as a member representing Asa/Ilorin West Federal Constituency in the House of Representatives. Born on 17 October 1969, he hails from Kwara State. He was elected into the House of Assembly at the 2015 elections under the All Progressives Congress (APC).
