= Kamal Abeysinghe =

Sri Lankan banker and social entrepreneur

- Education: Royal College Colombo
- Occupations: Banker; social entrepreneur
- Organization: EDEX
- Website: www.edex.lk

Kamal Abeysinghe is a Sri Lankan banker and a social entrepreneur. He is the founder and current chairman of EDEX.

Abeysinghe has served as the chairman of EDEX since its inception in 2004. EDEX was initiated as a social project to organize education exhibitions to provide career guidance for students who completed their A/L examinations. Since 2004 it has held exhibitions annually in Colombo and Kandy becoming the largest education fair in Sri Lanka.

During Abeysinghe's tenure as the chairman of EDEX, he has initiated several social development projects such as the Live your Dream project in 2012 which aims at empowering Sri Lankan youth and has carried out several school development projects in many parts of the country.

Educated at Royal College Colombo, he had worked at Sampath Bank for over two decades moving into its senior management where he had served as its head of compliance. He is a Fellow of the Institute of Bankers of Sri Lanka and a former treasurer of the Royal College Union.

== See also ==
- EDEX Expo
