= Kamal Hachkar =

Franco–Moroccan filmmaker

Kamal Hachkar كمال هشكار
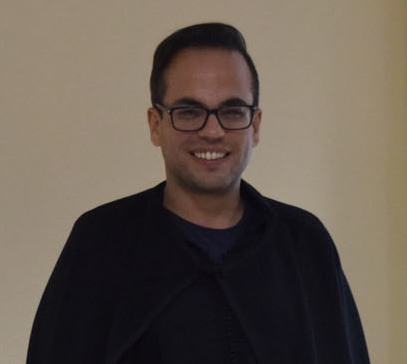
- Born: Kamal Hachkar; 25 February 1977 (age 49); Tinghir, Morocco
- Education: Sorbonne University
- Occupations: Director, academic
- Years active: 2013–present

Kamal Hachkar (Arabic: كمال هشكار; born 25 February 1977), is a Franco-Moroccan filmmaker, and academic. Kamal is best known as the director of the critically acclaim controversial documentary Tinghir-Jerusalem: The Echoes of the mellah.

== Personal life ==
He was born on 25 February 1977 in Tinghir, Morocco to a Berber family. At the age of just six months, he left Morocco with his mother for France, where his father worked as a worker since 1968. However, he had regular visits to Tinghir during summer vacation. Kamal obtained a master's degree in medieval history of the Muslim worlds at the Sorbonne University. In 2005, he became a teacher after passing certificate of aptitude for teaching secondary education.

== Career ==
In 2013, Kamal made his maiden documentary venture, Tinghir-Jerusalem: Les Échos du mellah. The film sets in time of the French protectorate in Morocco deals with the life and co–habitation of Berber Muslim and Jewish families in Tinghir during the desperate times. Even though, it was a controversial topic in Morocco, which was criticized by Islamists. Later the Justice and Development Party also joined the criticism citing that it as an invitation to normalize relations between Israel. However, the film received critical acclaim and several awards at the Moroccan National Film Festival.

In 2013, the film won Best Documentary Award at Paris International Fantastic Film Festival and then Grand Prix Eden for documentary at Lights of Africa Festival. At the Ashkelon Jewish Eye Festival, the film won Best Documentary Award, whereas it received Grand Prize for Best Documentary and Local and public press award at Nador International Festival of Cinema and Common Memory (FICMEC). In 2015, the film won Pomegranate Awards for Sephardi Excellence in the Arts at New York Sephardic Jewish Film Festival.

== Filmography ==
Year	Film	Role	Genre	Ref.
2013	Tinghir-Jerusalem: The Echoes of the mellah	Director, writer	documentary	
2019	In Your Eyes, I See My Country	Director, writer	documentary	
