= Kamal Sabti =

- كمال سبتي
- Born: 1954; Nasiriyah
- Died: 2006 (aged 51–52)
- Occupation: Poet

Kamal Sabti Ibrahim Al-Nasri (1954 – April 23, 2006) was an Iraqi poet.

== Life ==
He was born in the city of Nasiriyah and grew up there. He completed his primary education in Nasiriyah, followed by his intermediate education, earning his certificate in 1969. He then moved to Baghdad, where he enrolled in the Institute of Fine Arts and graduated with a degree in film directing in 1974. He continued his studies at the Academy of Fine Arts but did not complete it, as he joined military service. Later, in 1989, he fled to Spain, where he completed his studies at the Autonomous University of Madrid. In 1997, he sought political asylum in the Netherlands, where he continued working in writing until his death. His poetry was translated into various languages.
