= Şärif Kamal =

Tatar writer, novelist, literary translator and playwright (1884–1942)

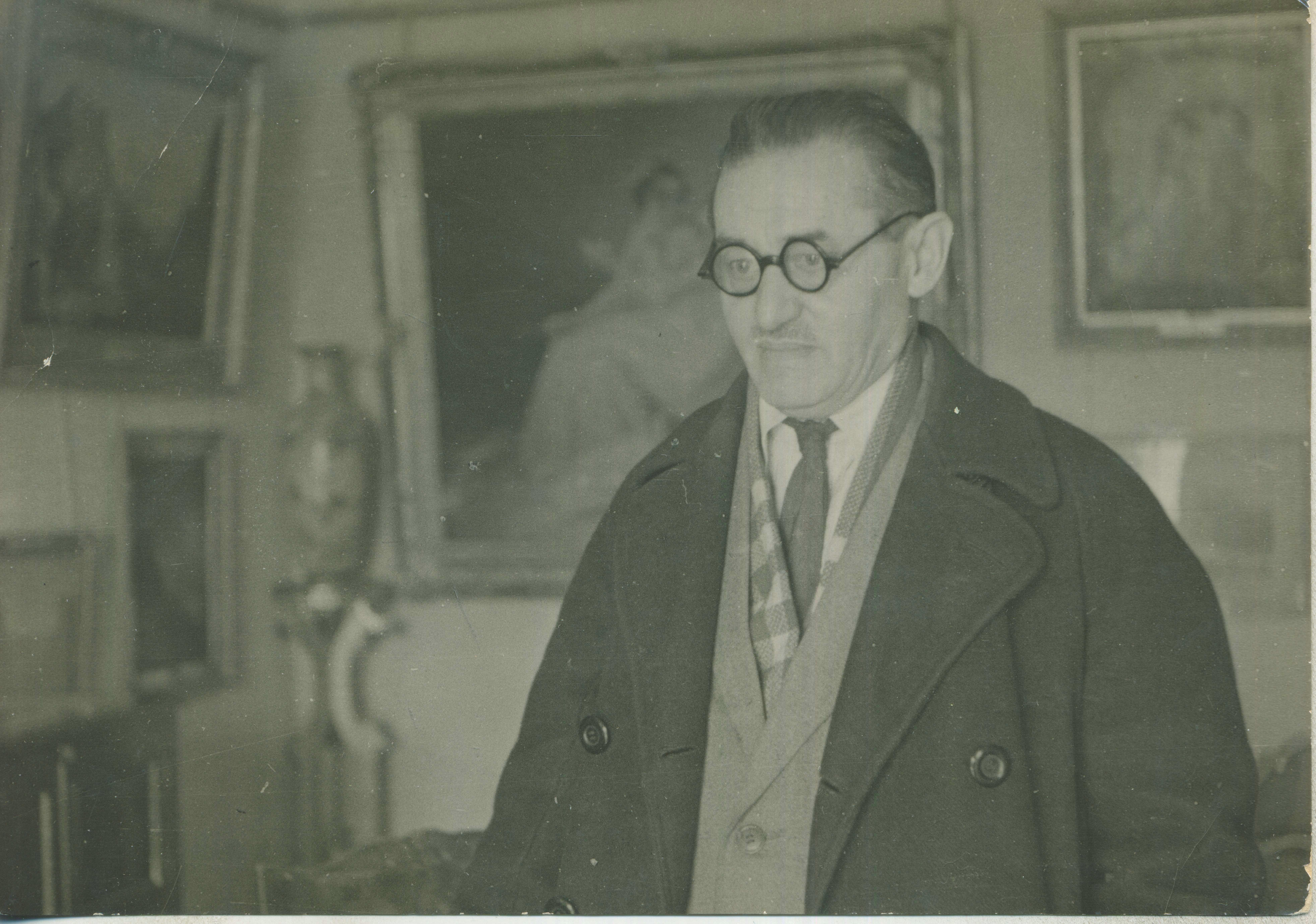
- Born: Şärif Kamaletdin ulı Baygildiyev; 27 February [O.S. 15 February] 1884; Tatar Peşläse, Penza Governorate, Russian Empire
- Died: 23 December 1942 (aged 58); Kazan, Tatar ASSR, Soviet Union
- Citizenship: Russian Empire • Soviet Union
- Occupation: Writer
- Spouse: Häyät Baygildiyeva
- Writing career
- Period: 1905–1942
- Genre: Realist literature • novellas • plays
- Notable work: The Seagulls (1915) • Haji Effendi is getting married (1916)
- Notable awards: Order of Lenin
- Literary movement: Socialist realism

Şärif Kamal (Tatar: Шәриф Камалетдин улы Камал (Байгилдиев), Tatar pronunciation: [ʃæˈrif kɑˈmɑl]; 27 February [O.S. 15 February] 1884 – 22 December 1942) was a prominent Tatar writer, novelist, playwright, and public figure. He is one of the largest representatives of Tatar literature of the early 20th century and the founders of socialist realism in Tatar national art.

Kamal is known as author of short stories, and feuilletons, the story “The Seagulls” (Tatar: Aqçarlaqlar), the novels “When the Beauty is Born” (Tatar: Matur tuğanda) and “With a Firm Tread” (Tatar: Nıqlı Adımnar), plays and cycles of poems. He translated works by Nikolai Gogol and Mikhail Sholokhov from Russian into Tatar.

== Literary works ==
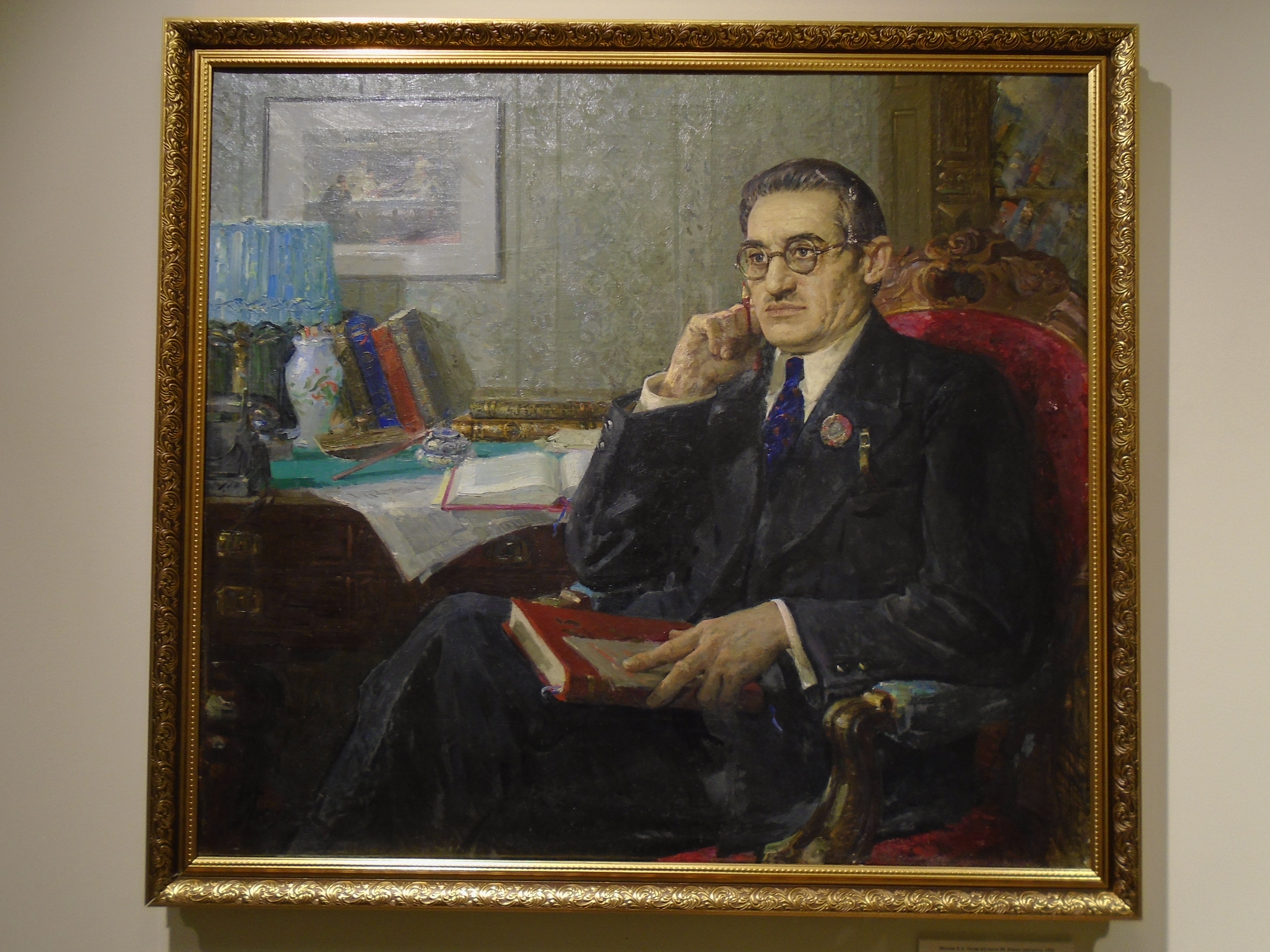
Şärif Kamal's portrait by Kharis Yakupov. 1949.

Kamal's first poems were published in 1905 in the Tatar newspaper Nur, published in St. Petersburg. A year later, the printing house of the same newspaper published a collection of his poems, Sada (Voice). In 1909–1912, he wrote the story The Crow’s Nest and the short stories In Search of Happiness, In a Foreign Land and The Tramp, which described the hard life of workers. The story The Seagulls is dedicated to the exploitation of fishermen. During the same period, Kamal wrote a number of satirical works directed against merchants and bourgeois nationalists. The works Wilted Flower and Boredom are devoted to the issue of equal rights for women.

After the October Revolution, Kamal created the novel Tañ atqanda (At the dawn) about the revolution, Matur tuğanda (When the Beauty is born) about the tatar village of the 1920s. He also created dramatic works Ut (Fire), Kozğınnar oyasında (The Crow’s Nest), Tawlar (Mountains), Toman artı (Behind the Fog). Kamal was the first to translate Virgin Soil Upturned by Sholokhov into Tatar.
