= Kamal Kumar Tanti =

Assamese Writer

- Born: Kamal Kumar Tanti; 1982 (age 43–44)
- Education: PhD in Astronomy & Astrophysics
- Occupations: Assistant Professor, Poet, writer
- Awards: Sahitya Akademi Yuva Puraskar (2012); Munin Barkotoki Literary Award (2008)

Kamal Kumar Tanti (born 1982) is an Assamese poet from Assam, India.

== Works ==
Tanti belongs to the Tea-garden labour Community of Assam. His first collection of poetry, Marangburu Amar Pita (Our Father Marangburu), won Yuva Puraskar for 2012, that is awarded to 24 young writers below 35 years of age. and the Munin Barkataky Literary Award for 2008. His Assamese poems have been included in various anthologies of Assamese poetry and featured in various journals in Assamese. He writes fiction occasionally and few of his short-stories have been included in several anthologies of Assamese fiction.

Tanti’s first collection of prose in Assamese, Nimnaborgo Somaaj Oitijya (Subaltern Society's Legacy), is composed of critical essays on Subaltern historiography and post-colonial theory, with specific reference to colonial history and cultures of Assam. This book was selected as one of the "Ten Best Books" among all the Assamese books that has been published during the year 2007-08, by Grantha-Bandhab (Friends of Books), an organization in Assam.

Tanti’s translated poems(Assamese to English) have appeared in many journals, including Indian Literature, The Little Magazine, Muse India, Kavya Bharati, Pyrta, Exchanges Literary Journal, Cerebration, NELit Review, Kritya, Visual Verse, Brown Critique, Steer Queer, etc. His poems also included in several anthologies of English poems, including 40 Under 40, Shout It Out! Anthology, The World I Write In, etc.

=== Poetry ===
Marangburu Amar Pita (Our Father Marangburu). 2007.

Uttar-Ouponibeshik Kabita (Post-colonial Poems) Papyrus, Guwahati. 2018.

=== Essay collections ===
Nimnaborgo Somaaj Oitijya (Subaltern Society's Legacy). 2007.

Uttar-Ouponibeshik Somaluchona (Post-colonial Criticism).
