= Kamal Ahmed (politician) =

Bahraini politician

Kamal Ahmed is a Bahraini politician and current Minister of Transportation and Communications. In February 2011, he became the Minister of State for Cabinet Affairs of Bahrain by the appointment of King Hamad ibn Isa Al Khalifa. He has also been the Executive Chairman of Operations at the Bahrain Development Board.

== Biography ==
He holds a Bachelor's degree in Civil Engineering from 1994 and a Master's degree in International Project Management from the University of Leeds.

He joined the Bahrain Economic Development Board (BEDB) in 2004, directing the Industry Program that coordinates national industry policy, strategies, and business development plans with key ministries. He then rose to chief operating officer of the Board, was chaired by Salman, Crown Prince of Bahrain.

In February 2011, he was appointed Minister of Cabinet Affairs. Then, in February 2012, he was appointed Minister of Transportation, renamed Minister of Transportation and Communications in December 2014.
