= Sikirat Anako =

Nigerian politician (born 1952)

The Honourable Sikirat Anako

Member of the Kwara State House of Assembly
- In office 18 March 2015 – 18 March 2019

Member of the Kwara State House of Assembly from Oyun Local Government
- In office 18 March 2015 – 18 March 2019
- Constituency: Odo-Ogun

Personal details
- Born: 28 April 1952 (age 74) Erin-Ile,Oyun Local Government Kwara State Nigeria
- Party: People's Democratic Party (Nigeria)
- Education
- Occupation: Politician

Sikirat Anako (born 1952) is a Nigerian Politician and member of the 8th assembly representing Odo-Ogun constituency at the Kwara State House of Assembly.
