= Kamal Sagar =

Indian architect (born 1969)

- Born: 16 July 1969 (age 57)
- Education: Indian Institute of Technology, Kharagpur
- Occupations: Director, Total Environment
- Spouse: Shibanee Sagar

Kamal Sagar (born 16 July 1969) is an Indian architect, designer, real estate developer, restaurateur, and music enthusiast. Based in Bangalore, India, he is the founder and chairman of Total Environment Building Systems, and Total Environment Hospitality (Windmills Craftworks and Oota).

== Early life ==
Kamal graduated from IIT Kharagpur in 1992, with a degree in architecture. After a short stint with Omni Architects at Lexington, Kentucky, USA, he returned to India. As a young architect, he was entrusted with the design and construction of Poonawalla Stud Farms at Hadapsar and Theur, Pune. For this project, he extensively used exposed brick masonry, evolving a special technique with the help of steel spacers to bring out the character of every individual brick – in line with his core design philosophy of using natural materials that blend with the landscape and age gracefully. He built this out in a span of just 8 months, in time for the Asian Racing Conference by Asian Racing Federation on 27 January 1995.

== Career ==
In 1995, Kamal's move to Bangalore marked the beginning of a significant chapter in his career. He started his own architectural practice, first under his own name, and later as Shibanee & Kamal Architects, along with his wife and partner. In 1996, in his search for a one-bedroom apartment, he realized just how bad the state of large scale housing projects was, and saw tremendous scope to make a difference in this area. After several failed attempts in trying to get developers to accept his design ideas, he decided to take on the task of developing and constructing his projects. He founded Total Environment, a construction and real estate development company, to build out his designs. Total Environment has since built more than 4.5 million square feet of individually customized and furnished space, mostly homes, across Bangalore, Hyderabad and Pune. "Tapestry", located in Frisco, Dallas-Fort Worth metro area in the US, is a 56-acre, 121-home residential community - the company’s first international endeavor.

Kamal’s work has always been inspired by music, art and nature. His architectural inspirations include Frank Lloyd Wright, Bart Prince, Bruce Goff, Alvar Aalto, Mies van de Rohe, and Tadao Ando. He also draws inspiration from sources as varied as Enid Blyton, Alexandre Dumas, Pink Floyd, Ahmad Jamal, Benny Goodman, Stan Getz, Los Paraguayos, etc.

In 2012, he founded Windmills Craftworks, a Jazz Theater, Microbrewery and Restaurant, where the audience gets to experience talent from across the globe at close quarters, with superior sound quality in a setting with beer and food. In less than two years, Windmills Craftworks soon established itself as a live music venue in Bangalore, bringing varied music ranging from Jazz, Blues, rock, folk, Bluegrass, Indian Classical music, Indian folk music and Latin.

== Work ==
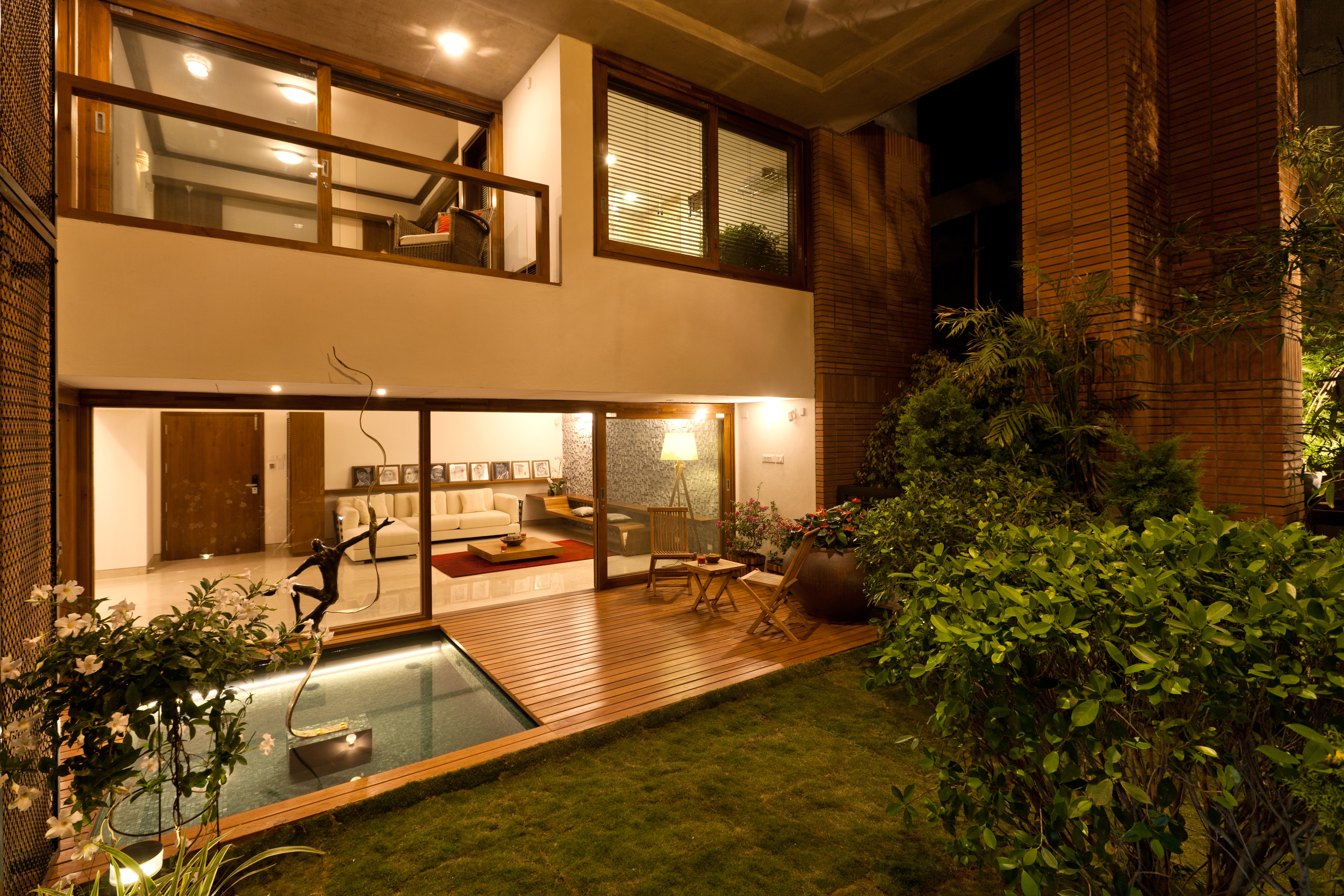
The Magic Faraway Tree, Kanakapura Road, Bangalore

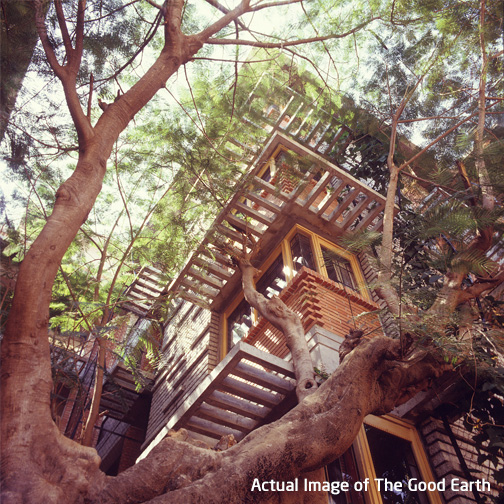
The Good Earth, Ulsoor, Bangalore

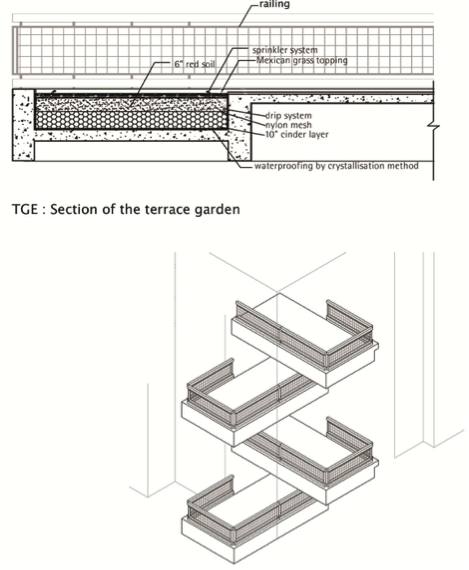
Section of the terrace garden

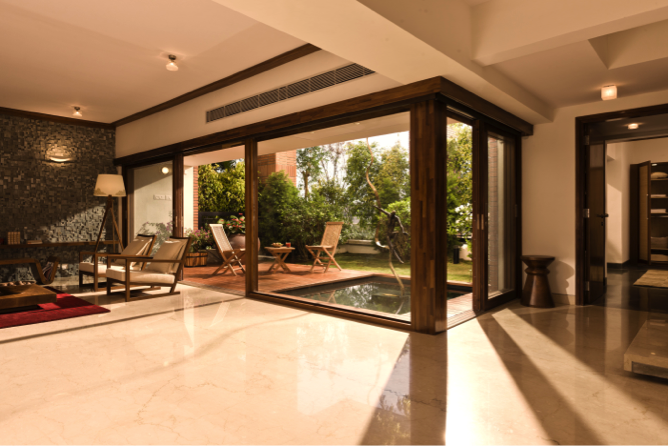
The Magic Faraway Tree, Kanakapura Road, Bangalore

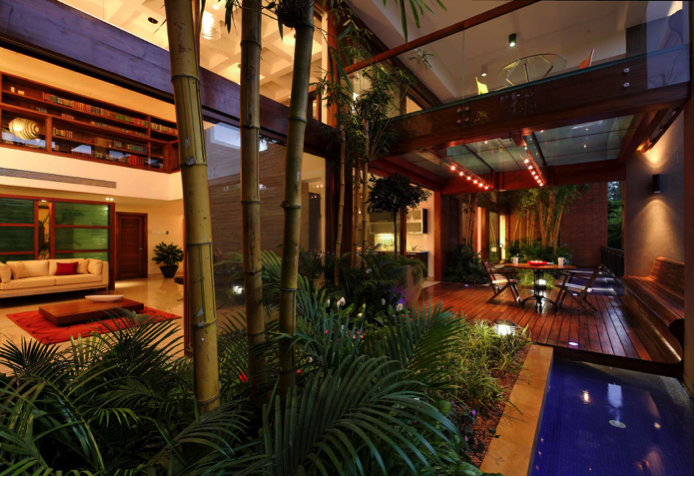
Windmills of Your Mind, Whitefield, Bangalore

=== Design Philosophy ===
Kamal’s work has focused on using natural materials to create warm living spaces, through handcrafted homes that embrace nature. His people-centric design philosophy and the idea of providing a garden with every home have defined the product offerings of Total Environment. Over the years, he experimented with various different formats for these gardens, with most rooms having visual/physical access to these gardens.

“We combine our design skills with excellent craftsmanship to deliver homes of the highest quality, always striving to design and build the most beautiful homes in the world," says Kamal Sagar

Total Environment has leveraged technology to deliver custom-designed homes at scale. Their proprietary platform "eDesign" offers homebuyers options to customize their floor plan and furniture layouts, feature enhancements, design studio, functional planning and much more in an online, 3D format.

== Projects ==
1995 Poonawalla Stud Farms, Hadpsar, Pune, India
1999 Ion Idea Corporate Campus, Whitefield, Bangalore, India
2000 Bougainvillea, Vibhuthipura, Bangalore, India
2000 Green is the Colour, BTM Layout, Bangalore, India
2001 The Good Earth, Ulsoor, Bangalore, India
2001 Webb India Limited – Corporate Office & workshops, Bommasandra, Bangalore, India
2004 Shine On, Rahath Bagh, Bangalore, India
2004 Time, Indiranagar, Bangalore, India
2006 Footprints, Indiranagar, Bangalore, India
2006 Residence for Navin Dhananjay, Hennur Road, Bangalore, India
2008 Raindrops Keep Falling on my Head, Sarjapur Road, Bangalore, India
2009 Orange Blossom Special, Uday Baugh, Pune, India
2010 Greensleeves, Singasandra, Bangalore, India
2015 Windmills of Your Mind, Whitefield, Bangalore, India
2015 The Magic Faraway Tree, Phase 1, Kanakapura Road, Bangalore, India
2017 Van Gogh's Garden, Bangalore, India
2017 College of Engineering Pune
2020 Lost in the Greens, Bangalore, India
2021 A Few Honest Words, Bangalore, India
2023 Green-roof Walk Home, Hyderabad, India

== Awards and recognition ==
In recognition of his work, Kamal has won several architectural design awards at both national and international levels, including many projects that were finalists at the World Architecture Festival.

S. No	Award	Category	Year	Project
1	Distinguished Alumnus Award (DAA), IIT Kharagpur	Distinguished Alumnus for Platinum Jubilee	2026	-
2	Finalist at WAF, Singapore	Completed Buildings - House & Villa	2024	Green-roof Walk, Hyderabad
3	Finalist at WAF, Singapore	WAF Completed Buildings: Housing	2023	Lost in the Greens, Bangalore
4	Winner of The Economic Times Real Estate Conclave & Awards	Residential Project: Row Housing	2022	The Magic Faraway Tree, Bangalore
5	Winner of The Economic Times Real Estate Conclave & Awards	Architectural Project: Residential	2022	Windmills of Your Mind
6	Finalist at WAF	Highly Commended, Future Project: Office	2021	Total Environment Business Park
7	Finalist at WAF	Completed Buildings: Display	2019	Think Design, Bangalore
8	Finalist at WAF	Completed Buildings: Housing	2019	Van Gogh's Garden, Bangalore
9	Finalist at WAF	Completed Buildings: Housing	2019	The Magic Faraway Tree, Bangalore
10	Finalist at WAF	Completed Buildings: Higher Education and Research	2019	BHAU Institute of Innovation, Entrepreneurship and Leadership, Pune
11	Finalist at WAF, Amsterdam	Best Large Scale Housing Project in the World	2018	Windmills of Your Mind
12	Winner of The Innovation in Structural Engineering	Bentley – Be Inspired Awards	2013	College of Engineering, Pune
13	Best Luxury Residential Project – South	Zee Business - RICS Real Estate Awards	2011	Windmills of Your Mind
14	Outstanding Concrete Structure	ICI (Pune) – Birla Super	2011	Orange Blossom Special
15	Sustainable Design Award	Society Interiors	2010	Windmills of Your Mind
16	CNBC Arabia International Property Awards	Best Residential Architecture – Asia Pacific Region	2009	Windmills of Your Mind
17	CNBC Arabia International Property Awards	Best Residential Development – India	2009	Windmills of Your Mind
18	Runner-up for the Style Icon for Excellence in Architecture	Kansai Nerolac	2007	Shine On 2
19	Winner of The Habitat Award for Apartment Planning	Architecture + Design Spectrum Foundation	2005	Time
20	Winner of The Habitat Award for Apartment Planning	Architecture + Design Spectrum Foundation	2003	The Good Earth
21	Winner of The Best Group Housing Project	JK Cements – Architect of the Year Awards	2002	The Good Earth
22	Habitat Award for Apartment Planning	Architecture + Design Spectrum Foundation	2002	Reach for the Sky
23	Habitat Award for Apartment Planning	Architecture + Design Spectrum Foundation	2002	Bougainvillea
24	Winner of The Institutional Architecture Award	Architecture + Design Spectrum Foundation	2002	Webb India Limited
25	Young Enthused Architect	Architecture + Design Spectrum Foundation	2002	The Poonawalla Stud Farms
