= Kamal Patel =

Kamal Patel may refer to:

- Kamal Patel (politician) (born 1961), politician of the Bharatiya Janata Party (BJP) from Madhya Pradesh, India.
- Kamal Patel (researcher), nutrition researcher and the director of Examine.com
