= Kamal Siegel =

Chilean musician (born 1978)

Kamal Siegel (born 1978 in Punta Arenas, Chile) is a Chilean musician and digital artist.

His music was featured on an album produced by Grammy award-winner KC Porter called Temple of Light

The compilation features one of the pieces from Kamal's album "First Steps" that he launched in 2005. The album (First Steps) was recorded and produced in Chile by Faro Producciones and later self-published in the United States.

== Shipped Games ==
- Supreme Commander 2 (Xbox) by Gas Powered Games
- Pirates of the Burning Sea
- NHL Rivals 2004
- NBA Inside Drive 2002
- NFL Fever 2002
- Nancy Drew wolf of icicle creek (PC) by HER Interactive
- Inside Pitch (Xbox) by Microsoft
- Polar Pool (PC) by WildTangent
- Nicktropolis (PC) by Nickelodeon

== Press Coverage and other References ==
El Diario Austral, Jueves 8 de Mayo 1997 A-8 "Nuevos Naipes Para el Arte Local"
Mukilteo Beacon, June 2, 2004, Pg 2 "Mecha-Teknarr takes on Mickey at the Point"
El Diario Austral, Miercoles 21 de Agosto de 1996 A-9 "El Talento en la Imaginacion"
El Diario Austral, Miercoles 2 de Abril de 1997 A-9 "Los Pintores de Menuda Edad"
El Diario Austral, Sabado 15 de Noviembre de 1997 A13 "Juventud, Realidad y Fantasia"
El Diario Austral, Martes 6 de Mayo de 1997 A-9 "Se Rompe la Vitrina en Temuco"
Atina Chile Press Release
Nightengale Publication Ad
Ebila Artist Bio

News About First Steps Album
Making of First Steps
Making of First Steps Video
Kamal guest lecture at Edmonds Community College to exchange students from Denmark
Pirates of the Burning Sea Credits
