= Kamal Ataya =

Palestinian business executive (born 1941)

- Born: Kamal Mohamed Ataya; 15 March 1944 (age 82); Beirut, Lebanon
- Education: American University of Beirut
- Occupation: Chief Executive Officer RAK Gas LLC
- Children: 3

Kamal Mohamed Ataya (born 1944) is a Lebanese business executive. He was the chief executive officer of RAK GAS LLC. He was appointed to the position of chief executive officer of the company in 2013 and left in 2018.

RAK Gas LLC sources and markets natural gas, and was formerly known as Ras Al Khaimah Gas Commission and changed its name to RAK Gas LLC in 2007. The company was founded in 1984 and is based in Ras Al Khaimah, United Arab Emirates.

Kamal was appointed to that position by His Highness Sheikh Saud Bin Saqr Al Qasimi, ruler of the Emirate of Ras Al Khaimah & Chairman of RAK Gas, and he managed international as well as local businesses of the company.

== Early life ==
Kamal Ataya was born on 15 March 1944 in Lebanon. He earned his bachelor's degree in Business Administration from the American University, Beirut in 1969.

== Professional career ==
Kamal joined the oil and gas industry at the age of 21, in 1969 as Operations Manager at Oilfields Supply Center in UAE.

=== 1975–1995 ===
After a successful career at Oilfields Supply Center, he joined Crescent Petroleum Company as its Executive Commercial Director, first as a Commercial and Procurement Manager and later the Vice President of Commercial overseeing contract negotiations and the company's offshore drilling programme.

=== 1996– 2012 ===
Kamal joined Kappa Energy, a Canadian Oil & Gas as president and Chief Operating Officer of Middle East from 1995 to 1998, securing award of new Oil concessions in the Middle East; farm-in and operator-ship of the Block 2 concession in Yemen and award of a new concession block in Egypt. He left Kappa Energy and founded Al Safwah Oilfields Supply & Services LLC, UAE in 1999 operating primarily, throughout the Middle East and North Africa. The company maintains liaison offices and representatives in the UK and Canada. Kamal is also the co-founder of Vega Petroleum Limited, British Virgin Island company that owns the producing REU concession with its own production & storage facilities in the Gulf of Suez, Egypt.
