= Kamal Siddiqi =

Kamal Siddiqi is an Australian journalist of Pakistani and Nigerian origin. He was the Director of Centre for Excellence in Journalism at Institute of Business Administration in Karachi. Previously, he was the editor of The Express Tribune, the Pakistani affiliate of the International Herald Tribune. Before that, he was the Editor Reporting at The News based in Karachi. He has written for The Age and The Australian. Topics he has written about include religious minorities in Pakistan, human rights, democratic development, and rule of law.

== Personal life ==
Siddiqi was born in Kano, Nigeria and raised in Kano and Karachi, Pakistan. He has lived in London, Islamabad, Sydney, Melbourne and Karachi. He currently resides in Karachi, Pakistan, and has two adult children.

Both his children are graduates of the Australian National University, and reside in Canberra.

== Career ==
Siddiqi was a business and financial journalist prior to turning to opinion writing and editing. In 1990, he started at The News as a copy editor on the city desk.

Siddiqi received a master's degree from Karachi University. In 1994, he was awarded the Britannia Scholarship and completed a master's of science degree in media studies from the London School of Economics.

After obtaining his masters in 1995, he was appointed Pakistan Correspondent for the Asia Times, a Bangkok-based daily. Siddiqi remained at Asia Times until 1998 when he moved to Dow Jones News Wires. During this period, he was the country writer for the Economist Intelligence Unit country forecast report (EIU) for Pakistan and joined Dawn as a member of the editorial board and lead writer.

Siddiqi served as a lecturer at the Karachi University's Department of Journalism, where he has continued to lecture after his family returned to Pakistan from Australia in the early 2000s.

In 2001, Siddiqi started work as a lecturer on journalism at the Gippsland Campus of Monash University in Melbourne, Australia. Between 2002 and 2003, he authored the book The internet journalist and edited Journos on Journalism.

Later in 2003, after living in Australia for Pakistan, Siddiqi rejoined the editorial board of Dawn. In 2005, he joined The News as editor reporting, where he oversaw the city pages in Karachi and the national business pages. In 2007, Siddiqi re-launched the city pages at The News.

In 2009, Siddiqi joined The Express Tribune as its launch editor. He oversees four print editions (Karachi, Lahore, Islamabad and Peshawar) and the online edition.

In 2012, Siddiqi became a Draper Hills Summer Fellow, hosted by the Stanford University Center on Democracy, Development, and the Rule of Law.

In 2016, he became Director of the Centre for Excellence in Journalism (CEJ) at the Institute of Business Administration (IBA) in Karachi, after he resigned from The Express Tribune.

== Political viewpoint ==
In a 2011 interview with Global Journalist, Siddiqi explained that he seeks to report on Pakistan in a positive light. He stated, "I think most of the news about Pakistan is negative that you see – not just in America, but in other parts of the world. But I feel that more should be told about the good things that are happening in Pakistan." In the same interview, he took a pro-democracy stance, stating that the biggest problem in Pakistan is "Extremism, religious extremism." and that "the biggest solution is democracy."

== Bibliography ==
- Kamal Siddiqi (Ed.): Journos on journalism, Monash University, Melbourne, 2003, ISBN 0732622220
- Kamal Siddiqi, Churchill, Victoria: The internet journalist, CeLTS, Monash University, 2002, ISBN 0732622204
