= EDEX Expo =

- Frequency: Annual
- Locations: BMICH, Colombo; Kandy City Center, Kandy
- Years active: 22
- Organiser: EDEX

EDEX Expo is an annual career fair and exhibition in Sri Lanka which is the flagship event of EDEX. Over the years it has become the primary career fair in the country and a national event with the primary exhibition taking place at BMICH, Colombo followed by a secondary exhibition taking place at Kandy a few weeks later. It is organized by the Royal College Union (RCU) in collaboration with the Government of Sri Lanka.

At EDEX Expo, service providers from various related sectors showcase opportunities in a mutually interacting environment of visitors and exhibitors. Participants include local and foreign universities and tertiary education institutes, professional institutes, vocational and technical training institutes, corporate institutes focusing on new recruitments.

Its visitor profile includes senior students, school leavers, job seekers, unemployed, underemployed and those seeking higher educational, technical or vocational training opportunities or professional qualifications; individuals desirous of becoming gainfully employable, be competitive and self-confident.

In 2014, EDEX in collaboration with International Labour Organization (ILO) has launched a national job fair aimed at providing job opportunities for youth. The first EDEX Job Fair will be held at the EDEX Expo 2014.

== See also ==
- EDEX
