= Kamal Choudhary =

Indian American physicist and computational materials scientist

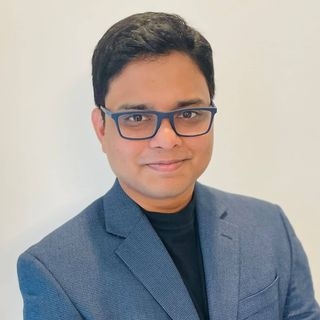
- Education: University of Florida (Ph.D., 2015)
- Known for: NIST-JARVIS AtomGPT Fellow of the American Physical Society
- Scientific career
- Fields: Physics, Quantum Chemistry, Computational Materials Science
- Workplaces: Johns Hopkins University
- Doctoral advisor: Susan Sinnott

Kamal Choudhary is an Indian American physicist and computational materials scientist. He is a professor in the Department of Materials Science and Engineering at Johns Hopkins University, with a joint appointment in electrical and computer engineering. He previously served as a staff scientist at the National Institute of Standards and Technology (NIST), where he developed the NIST-JARVIS infrastructure for materials design. In 2025, he was elected a Fellow of the American Physical Society in the Topical Group of Data Science.

== Career ==
Choudhary earned a Ph.D. in materials science and engineering from the University of Florida in 2015 and subsequently joined NIST. He was awarded a NIST accolade award in 2017 for work in data computing and data sharing for materials design.

Choudhary's research involves atomistic materials design using classical mechanics, quantum mechanics, and machine learning methods. He is the creator of the JARVIS infrastructure for materials design and the developer of AtomGPT.org, an AI platform for materials science.

His research interests include condensed matter physics, density functional theory, force fields, graph neural networks, large language models, and quantum computing algorithms.
