= Kamal Khan Rustami =

Kamal Khan Rustami (fl. 1649) was a poet in the Sultanate of Bijapur, who wrote in Deccani and Persian.

In 1647, the court poets were asked by queen Khadija Sultana to make a Deccani translation of Muhammad ibn Husam's 15th-century Persian prose Khavarannama ("Book of the East"), which focused on the campaigns of the venerated Shia figure Ali. Presented under a slightly altered title, Rustami's Khavarnama (1649) was the work that won the competition. This poem is the longest masnavi written in Deccani, with over 24,000 verses. It is considered a translation even though it differs from the Persian original in some ways.

== Sources ==
- Sharma, Sunil (2020). "Forging a Canon of Dakhni Literature: Translations and Retellings from Persian". In Overton, Keelan (ed.). Iran and the Deccan: Persianate Art, Culture, and Talent in Circulation, 1400–1700. Indiana University Press. pp. 401–420. ISBN 978-0253048912.
