= Kamal Singh Dao =

Indian Zamindar

- Known for: Indian Freedom Struggle
- Movement: Sambalpur Uprising

Kamal Singh Dao or only known as Kamal Singh was the son of Balabhadra Singh Dao, the Zamindar (landlord) of Lakhanpur locality of Bargarh district of Odisha and was a major aide of Veer Surendra Sai during the Sambalpur uprising against the British. He along with his brothers Khageswar Singh and Neelambar Singh played an important role as one of the second in commands of Surendra Sai. Kamal's father Balabhadra Singh attained martyrdom in the earlier days of the rebellion. His brother Khageswar died under British imprisonment in Asirgarh jail.

== Martyrdom of Balabhadra Singh ==
Kamal's father Balabhadra Singh Dao was opposed to the hideous policies of the British that were unbearable for the region's farmers. He and his sons were one of the first in the region to openly revolt and were supported widely by the Gond and Binjhal Gauntias (chieftains) 42 Parganas. The family's revolt gained momentum when Surendra Sai was denied his legal right over the Chauhan throne of Sambalpur and the tribal chieftains and landlords in the region, owing allegiance to the Chauhan family took to arms. Balabhadra and Avadhut Singh, the Zamindar of Bhenden attacked the queen Mohankumari unsuccessfully. The Debrigarh peak with a height of 2267 feet and its surrounding forest areas turned into a fortified position guarded by Kamal Singh and his brothers.

At Debrigarh, Surendra Sai lead the revolt and the position was defended by around 500 guerrilla fighters expert in archery. Using the location as a base camp, Balabhadra Singh and Avadhut Singh attacked a British camp with around hundred fighters burning it to the ground. On 12 November 1837, a traitor by the name Pahadu Gond disclosed information about the hideout of Surendra Sai and his aides to the king Narayan Singh. The British supported Narayan Singh along with the Zamindars of Rampur and Barpali attacked Debrigarh in the cover of night. Surendra Sai was himself severely injured but was able to make an escape with his other aides as Balabhadra Singh stood his ground facing the onslaught bravely and was subsequently killed. The three sons of Balabhadra led by Kamal pledged to take revenge on the British and their local associates.

== Kamal's Role in Sambalpur Uprising ==
On the event of Surendra Sai's breakout from Hazaribagh in July 1857, Kamal Singh and his brothers first took charge of the Debrigarh fortification which again became the operational base for the rebel activities. Debrigarh was very important due to its location and Surendra Sai could monitor the ongoing conflicts at Singhora Pass in the west, Jharghati in north and Barhpati in the south-east just in one night travelling despite being situated at remote distances. Kamal Singh himself fought with Madho Singh and his sons at Singhora pass developing close coordination with Kunjel Singh. He was not only an expert in guerrilla warfare but was also in gathering intelligence. He was able to raise rebel detachments efficiently. After the surrender of Surendra Sai, he jointly attacked the British with Kunjel Singh and tormented the British by committing loot of their administrative property. It is even perceived that Surendra Sai's surrender was a well planned move to create deception against the British. Surendra Sai cleverly managed to convince Major Impey to pay Kamal Singh and his followers rupees 500 in return of his surrender, which was to support them in future campaigns. Even though Kamal's brother Khageswar Singh himself surrendered on the same occasion, the coordination between him and Kamal was not detected by the British until he again attacked and looted them.

Remaining quite for sometime, the rebels regrouped and committed loot in the region hailing the name of Surendra Sai. The Gond leaders by the name Bandya Rai and Mahapatra Rai provided their assistance to Kamal in his efforts to harass the British administration. Understanding the surrendered leader was still being put up as a symbol of freedom, the British transferred Surendra to Asirgarh jail far away from the region to prevent any second chance of his escape and coordination with rebels who were still free. Eventually Kunjel Singh and his brothers were captured but Kamal chose to continue fighting the British and tormenting their efforts to bring normalcy. According to the British spies, Kamal coordinated with Surendra in Jail through his intelligence networks and was trying to raise a fresh rebel force at Jeypore in Koraput district. Kamal Singh was not caught for a longtime despite a reward money on his head.According to historian Dr. N.K.Sahu kamal singh was apprehended by the local king of Sarangarh when he found him wandering in disguise as a fakir and was transported to Asirgarh jail where he died later. The theory of local folklore legend still says that he was beheaded treacherously and his headless body was hung from a tree at Lakhanpur to instill fear in the minds of the commoners who rejected the British authority.This place is still known as 'Mud Kati' meaning severed head.
