= Kamal Somaia =

English cricketer

Personal information
- Full name: Kamal Anilkumar Somaia
- Born: 22 July 1968 (age 58); Wembley, London, England
- Batting: Right-handed
- Bowling: Slow left-arm orthodox

Domestic team information
- Years: Team
- 1989: Glamorgan
- 1989–1990: Staffordshire

Career statistics
| Competition | FC | LA |
|---|---|---|
| Matches | 3 | 2 |
| Runs scored | 50 | 0 |
| Batting average | 8.33 | 0.00 |
| 100s/50s | –/– | –/– |
| Top score | 15 | 0 |
| Balls bowled | 472 | 72 |
| Wickets | 8 | 1 |
| Bowling average | 30.62 | 88.00 |
| 5 wickets in innings | 1 | – |
| 10 wickets in match | – | – |
| Best bowling | 5/87 | 1/52 |
| Catches/stumpings | 1/– | –/– |
- Source: Cricinfo, 26 June 2010

Kamal Anilkumar Somaia (born 22 July 1968) is a former English cricketer. Somaia was a right-handed batsman who was a slow left-arm orthodox bowler. He was born at Wembley, London.

Somaia made his List-A debut for Glamorgan in 1989, playing against Somerset, followed by another match against Derbyshire in the same season. He also made his first-class debut for the county in 1989, playing against Gloucestershire and went on to play two more first-class matches against Derbyshire and Leicestershire, where he achieved his only five wicket haul taking 5/87.

Somaia also played two Minor Counties Championship matches for Staffordshire at Lichfield Road against Northumberland and Norfolk. In 1990, he played two MCCA Knockout Trophy matches for the county, both coming against Oxfordshire.
