= Kamal Mansur Alam =

Pakistani jurist

Justice of the Supreme Court of Pakistan
- In office 22 April 1999 – 26 January 2000

Chief Justice of the Sindh High Court
- In office 5 May 1998 – 21 April 1999
- Preceded by: Wajihuddin Ahmed
- Succeeded by: Nazim Hussain Siddiqui

Judge of the Sindh High Court
- In office 11 November 1990 – 22 April 1999

Personal details
- Born: April 23, 1937 Jaunpur, United Provinces, British India
- Died: June 22, 2011 (aged 74) Karachi, Sindh, Pakistan
- Profession: Jurist

Kamal Mansur Alam (23 April 1937 – 22 June 2011) was a Pakistani jurist who served as chief justice of the Sindh High Court and later as a justice of the Supreme Court of Pakistan. He was elevated to the Sindh High Court in 1990, became chief justice of that court in 1998, and was elevated to the Supreme Court in 1999.

== Early life ==
Alam was born on 23 April 1937 in Jaunpur in the United Provinces of British India. He was educated in Allahabad and migrated to Pakistan in 1949.

== Judicial career ==
Alam was appointed as a judge of the Sindh High Court on 11 November 1990. On 5 May 1998, he became chief justice of the Sindh High Court.

He was elevated to the Supreme Court of Pakistan on 22 April 1999 and remained in office until 26 January 2000. After the 1999 military coup, he refused to take an oath under the Provisional Constitutional Order.

During his judicial career, he was associated with environmental adjudication and was credited with initiating a Green Bench to hear environment-related cases.

== Later life ==
After retirement, Alam headed the Commission of Inquiry on Enforced Disappearances constituted in 2010. He also worked on the development of alternate dispute resolution mechanisms before his death.
