= Kamal Degregory =

Bahamian footballer (born 1974)

Personal information
- Date of birth: 29 January 1974 (age 52)
- Place of birth: Orlando, Florida, US
- Position: Right back

Youth career
- 1995–1996: Florida State U23

College career
Years	Team	Apps	(Gls)
1992–1995	UCF Knights		

Senior career*
Years	Team	Apps	(Gls)
1996–1997	Belén		
1998–1999	Caledonia AIA		
1999–2000	Lemense		

International career^{‡}
2004–2008	Bahamas	9	(0)
- * Club domestic league appearances and goals ‡ National team caps and goals as of 31 March 2016

Kamal De Gregory (born 29 January 1974) is a former professional footballer. Born in the United States, Degregory represented the Bahamas national team.

== Club career ==
Degregory played college soccer for the University of Central Florida and had stints in Costa Rica and Trinidad and Tobago as well as in Brazil.

== International career ==
He made his international debut for Bahamas in a March 2004 FIFA World Cup qualification match against Dominica and had earned a total of 9 caps, scoring no goals. He has represented his country in 4 FIFA World Cup qualification matches.
