= Kamal Khan Zadran =

General Kamal Khan Zadran (born 1974) is a member of a prominent family active in Eastern Afghanistan. In 2001 his brother Pacha Khan Zadran was a signatory of the Bonn Conference agreement that chose Hamid Karzai as the President of the Afghan Transitional Authority. In 2002 his brother Amanullah Zadran, defected from the Taliban and was appointed the Minister of Border Affairs and Tribal Affairs, and Pacha Khan was appointed Governor of Paktia Province.

Kamal Khan Zadran was appointed Governor of Khowst Province for the first seven months of 2002.

Kamal Khan Zadran lead Afghan forces in an international attempt to root out elements of the Taliban and al Qaeda believed to be entrenched in Khost in March 2002.

"There are 7,000 al-Qa'eda and their Afghan allies in the mountains around here. They all came here after the fall of Tora Bora and Operation Anaconda. Now they are fighting a guerrilla war and it is very difficult to defeat them."

The Telegraph reported that the Americans paid $200 per soldier per month to Kamal Khan Zadran and three rivals, and that this had led to a local civil war. The Telegraph named Zakim Khan as one of his rivals, and said he and the other two rivals were former Taliban commanders. Kamal Khan Zadran's brother Amanullah Zadran was also a recent defector from the Taliban.
