= Mario Fernando Aguilera =

Argentinian choreographer

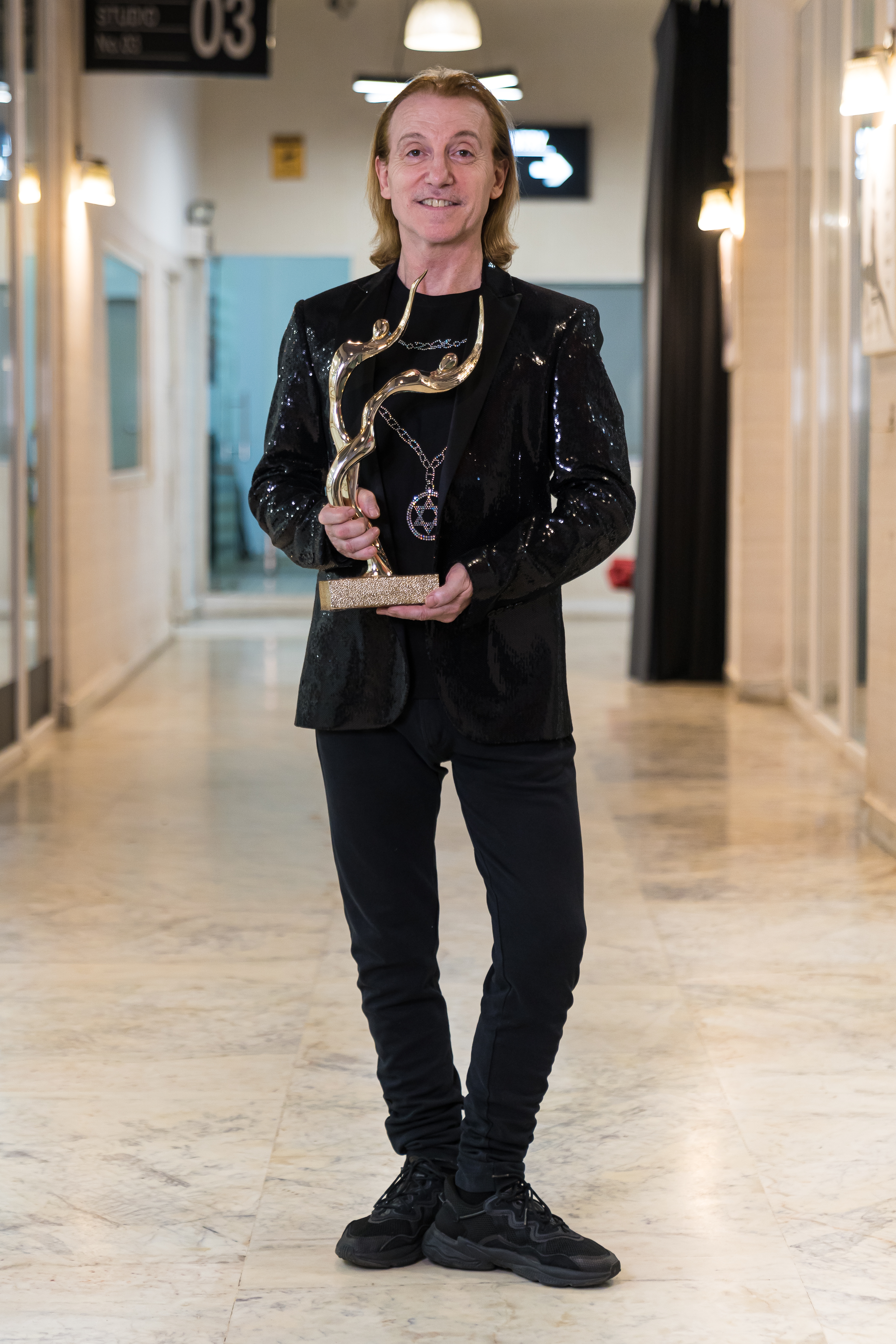
- Born: Buenos Aires, Argentina
- Occupations: choreographer, Ballet teacher, Ballet dancer

Mario Fernando Aguilera is an Argentinian choreographer, Ballet teacher, Ballet dancer and actor. In 2013 he appeared in Remo D'Souza's directorial ABCD: Any Body Can Dance.

He is also founder and director of Imperial Fernando Ballet Company (IFBC), an Indian dance school based in New Delhi, India. Mr. Aguilera has choreographed many notable projects across the world.

== Life and career ==
Mario Fernando Aguilera was born and raised in Buenos Aires, Argentina. He studied at the Instituto Superior de Arte del I.S.A. Teatro Colón.

His Maestros are Noemí Molinari, Wasil Tupin, Raúl Gatto, Rina Valver, Ruben Chayán, Ricardo Rivas and Tita Canas. He danced in the Danza Libre Company of Mar del Plata. In 1983 he was selected to the Ballet Company Teatro Colón, directed by Mario Galizzi, where he appeared in 'Sleeping Beauty'.

In the same Teatro he performed Ballet ’Coppelia', and Don Quixote under the Direction of Maestro Director Antonio Truyol & Mercedes Serrano. He was President of Jury of the selection for teachers at the Culture Centre "Puente Blanco San Luis".

He settled in Rio de Janeiro between 1989 and 1992, where he performed with different casts. Back in Buenos Aires, he founded 'Les Lions Ballet Compagnie (a private company that by 1993 had performed 60 performances). Fernando Aguilera is a Certified Teacher from the Vaganova Academy St. Petersburg - Russia.

He has been running the ballet school, Imperial Fernando Ballet Company, in Delhi since 1997.

Mr. Aguilera is the mentor of Kamal Singh, a notable ballet dancer from Delhi. Kamal is selected for English National Ballet School in London. He also trained Love Kotiya.

He is awarded from the Consejo Argentino de la Danza.

Mario Fernando Aguilera has choreographed and acted in Deepika Padukone's Parachute ad. The ballet dance from the song "Allah Duhai Hai" from the film Race 3 is choreographed by Fernando Aguilera. He also acted and choreographed in a scene "Ballet Dance Classes" of the film Happy New Year.

== Filmography ==
- ABCD: Any Body Can Dance as Chris
- ABCD 2 as Ballet Dance Teacher
- Happy New Year as Ballet Dance Teacher
