= Kamal Youcef-Toumi =

Algerian-American mechanical engineer

- Born: 1954 (age 71–72); Ksar Boukhari, Médéa, Algeria
- Scientific career
- Fields: mechanical engineering, mechatronics, robotics, nanotechnology, biotechnology

Kamal Youcef-Toumi (Arabic: كمال يوسف تومي; born in 1954) is an Algerian-American mechanical engineer.

== Life and career ==
He was born in 1954 in Ksar Boukhari in Médéa Province, in his home country of Algeria. He earned his B.Sc. from the University of Cincinnati in 1979, followed by his M.S. (1981) and D.Sc. (1985) in Mechanical Engineering from MIT.

He is currently a professor of mechanical engineering at the Massachusetts Institute of Technology (MIT), where he joined the faculty in 1985. Youcef-Toumi is widely recognized for his extensive work in design, modeling, simulation, instrumentation, and control theory, with applications spanning robotics, automation, metrology, and nanotechnology. He has authored numerous scientific publications and holds multiple patents. He also directs the Mechatronics Research Laboratory at MIT and co-directs the Center for Complex Engineering Systems.
