= India Weekly =

Indian online shopping website

IndiaWeekly
- Website: www.indiaweekly.biz
- Commercial: Yes
- Launched: 1993

IndiaWeekly is a commercial website serving India and its diaspora, providing them with an online shopping platform for entertainment products like movies, music, and gifts.

IndiaWeekly has over one million fans on social networking site Facebook. At one point it owned 54% of the online Indian DVD market as per a court document. Shivesh Kumar is the founder of IndiaWeekly.

== Legal cases ==
IndiaWeekly sued its competitor Nehaflix for an amount in excess of a million dollars in the U.S. Federal Court, alleging that they hacked into their computer system and stole its trade secrets. After a lawsuit which involved more than 250 court filings and which lasted around five years, IndiaWeekly finally got the Nehaflix.com website to be permanently shut down in a settlement.

In April 2011, IndiaWeekly received a favorable ruling from a senior US District Judge Melancon Tucker, who ordered that all Yahoo records of Nehaflix for 2002 to present, including all customer records, be handed over to counsels of IndiaWeekly. A document from Yahoo that was produced as a result of a subpoena issued to them by IndiaWeekly stated that Yahoo records contained over 150,000 customer orders that were received via website Nehaflix.com. IndiaWeekly received all of these customer records in the settlement.

== See also ==
- Asian Age
