= Kamal Qarur =

Algerian writer and journalist

- Born: 1966 (56 years)
- Education: BA from the Institute of Arabic Language and Literature at the University of Constantine in 1989
- Occupations: Writer, novelist, storyteller and journalist

Kamal Qarur (Arabic: كمال قرور) is an Algerian writer, novelist, storyteller and journalist, born in 1,966 inches (4,990 cm) the city of Beni Aziz, Setif.

== Education and Career ==
Qarur obtained his BA from the Institute of Arabic Language and Literature at the University of Constantine in 1989. Then he obtained a DEA in media and communication from the University of Algiers in 1992, and worked as a collaborating teacher at the Institute of Media and Communication between 1992 and 1993, and also worked as a journalist for Al-Wahda magazine between 1991 and 1993, He then established a private publishing house in 1993, and held some journalistic positions, including editor-in-chief of the weekly Abraaj magazine in 1997, then an editor-in-chief of the weekly newspaper Al-Wasit in 1998, then he was responsible for publishing in Fantasia Weekly magazine in 1999, in addition to his writings in a number of Algerian local newspapers, He is a founding member of the Literary Club of the Institute of Arts and Arabic Language at the University of Constantine, a founding member of the Setifiya Song Festival since 1994, a founding member of the laughter Festival in the city of El Eluma Festival since 1995, a contributing member in organizing literary days since 1996, and a member of the National Council of the Al-Jahizia Cultural Association since 2006. A founding member of the Algerian Civil Society Association since 2008, he also founded the Council of the Algerian Initiative for the Creation of Knowledge, and launched the Pocketbook project for youth.

In 2015, Kamal Qarur founded the "Al-Watan Al-Youm" house for publishing and distribution, which was able to publish about 140 books in various fields within a short period of time from the beginning of its establishment. Al-Aziz Boubakir, and the former Minister of Defense Khaled Nizar asked him to withdraw the book from the market. Kamal Qarur clashed with the former Algerian regime when the house published a book entitled "Bouteflika, the Man of Destiny" by writer and journalist Abdelaziz Boubakir, and former Defense Minister Khaled Nizar asked him to withdraw the book from the market.

== Works ==
Qarur has published many books that ranged from intellectual works to literary studies to long novels to story collections, including:

- "The Ultras is the epic of the knight who disappeared" (Original title calling: Altiras Malhamat Alfaris Aladhi Akhtafaa): it was published in 2007 by the House Arabic Scientific Publishers in Beirut, and it won the Malek Haddad Prize.
- "The Master of Desolation" ( Original title calling: Sayid Alkharab )(novel): Published in 2010 by Visera Publications.
- "Honorable General" (Original title calling: Hadrat Eljiniral) (novel): It was published in 2015 by Dar Al-Watan Al-Youm for publishing and distribution in Algeria.
- 'Thoughts of the Numidian Donkey" (Original title calling: Khawatir Alhimar Alnuwmidii): Published in 2007 by the National Foundation for Typographical Arts.

== Awards ==
The writer Kamal Garour has been honored by many parties in Iraq and the Arab world, and has received many literary awards, the most important of which are:

- Malik Haddad Prize for the novel in its fourth session in 2008, shared with Abeer Shahrazad for his novel "The Terrace, the Epic of the Knight Who Disappeared".
