= Kamal Al-Mansour =

Kamal Al-Mansour is an African American programmer and artist. Among other software, Al-Mansour designed, patented, and sold CPTime, a collection of new media and images featuring people of color in the late 1980s. Al-Mansour is now a digital artist who focuses on digital collage.

== Education and career ==
Kamal Amir Masiah Al Mansour was born in 1959 in Los Angeles, California. Subsequent to completing his secondary education, Al Mansour enrolled in university, initially planning to major in art; he graduated in 1981 with a bachelors of arts degree in political science, and a minor in African and African-American Studies, from the University of California, Los Angeles. Continuing his education on a postgraduate level, Al Mansour graduated with his Juris Doctor in 1984 from the University of California, Hastings College of the Law in San Francisco, California.

Al Mansour entered the corporate world through NASA's Jet Propulsion Laboratory in 1985 as a negotiator for software license agreements and technology transfers between California Institute of Technology and the United States Department of Energy. Continuing in the corporate world, Al Mansour worked for GTE Government Systems Division in Massachusetts. Al Mansour then founded the first Afrocentric interactive multimedia software programs, CPTime Online and AfroLink Software, among other interactive programs. AfroLink Software was formally introduced in 1990 through press releases to all Black publications and was used in various academic institutions as a tool to reflect Black culture and to address racial inequalities in US public education. The AfroLink bulletin board system contained half a gigabyte of media files to increase access to what Al-Mansour called "blackware." AfroLink tools were used by HBCUs and public schools as educational resources on Black history and medicine.

In the late 1990s and early 2000s, Al Mansour pivoted from corporate law to IT. He created a web based version of AfroLink Software, where he also sold apparel. In 2003, he decided to return to art; in 2005, he held his first solo exhibition "We Cannot Forget". Al Mansour has been exhibiting art throughout the U.S. since then. His mixed-media artwork explores sociopolitical issues, often highlighting race in America.

During the ongoing COVID-19 pandemic, he has founded artGriot Publishing, where he is currently the Creative Director.

== Publications ==
- Articles (06/2020 - 03/2021) on Medium
  - Author of pieces discussing topics ranging from Black Lives Matter to fine art of an online publishing platform.
- DIVINE CONSCIOUSNESS: From a Dystopian Diaspora to Afrofuturism. ArtGriot. 2020. ISBN 9781735613925.
  - Author of a novel that explores African diaspora from beginning to future. Al Mansour analyzes how Black American experiences are dystopian, as well as how Afrocentricity, ancestral memories, and a transformation and elevation of the Black collective consciousness are key in moving towards Afrofuturism.
- Art is the Weapon. ArtGriot. 2023.
  - Author of an e-book based on the eponymous podcast about African American artists who create weaponized art to expand Black culture and consciousness.
