= Kamal Kaya Efendi =

Ottoman army officer

Kamal Kaya Efendi, also known as Kemal Kaya Effendi (Ottoman Turkish: كمال کایا افندﻯ; Chinese: 卡邁勒·卡亞·埃芬迪), was an Ottoman Turk who may have been a Soviet agent. He studied in Germany and Paris, and fought under Von Epp in the Caucasus during World War I.

He entered Xinjiang in the company of another Turk. Both of them were enemies of Mustafa Kemal Atatürk, and were exiled out of Turkey by him.

He was deported by Jin Shuren in 1930. He entered into Ma Zhongying's service and encouraged him to attack Xinjiang to avenge himself on Jin Shuren. The Chinese Kuomintang government wanted Jin Shuren to be removed due to his independent foreign policy. Kamal served as Ma Zhongying's chief of staff in the Kuomintang 36th Division (National Revolutionary Army).

He spoke French and met Sven Hedin while Sven was in Xinjiang. By that time, he was sick of Xinjiang and Gansu and wanted to return to his native Turkey.

He was captured by pro Soviet forces in Kumul in 1934 and sent to Urumqi. Instead of being imprisoned or executed, he was made Commissar for Road Construction in Xinjiang. He may therefore have been a Soviet agent. Other people who were captured by pro-Soviet forces, such as the Uyghur Sabit Damulla Abdulbaki, were imprisoned or summarily executed.

A member of the Haardt-Citroën Expedition (W. Petro) who became his personal guest in Kumul said that he spoke perfect French and when asked why he was working with Ma Zhongying, he claimed to have been supposedly motivated by religious reasons.

There were other Turkish Young Turks who advised the First East Turkestan Republic, who were in league with the Japanese and had Pan-Turanist goals. Kamal Kaya Effendi was not interested in Pan-Turanism.
