= Kamal Oyekunle Fagbemi =

Nigerian politician (born 1963)

The Honourable Kamal Oyekunle Fagbemi

Member of the Kwara State House of Assembly
- In office 18 March 2015 – 18 March 2019

Member of the Kwara State House of Assembly from Oyun Local Government
- In office 18 March 2015 – 18 March 2019
- Constituency: Oke-ogun

Personal details
- Born: 28 April 1963 (age 63) Ijagbo,Oyun Local Government Kwara State Nigeria
- Party: People's Democratic Party (Nigeria)
- Occupation: Politician

Kamal Oyekunle Fagbemi (born April 28, 1963) is a Nigerian Politician and member of the 8th assembly representing Oke-ogun constituency at the Kwara State House of Assembly.

== Early life and education ==
Kamal Oyekunle Fagbemi was born on 28 April 1963 in Ijagbo, Oyun Local Government Area of Kwara State, Nigeria.

== Political career ==
Kamal Oyekunle Fagbemi is a Nigerian politician who represented the Oke-Ogun Constituency in the Kwara State House of Assembly. He was elected as a member of the 8th Kwara State House of Assembly in 2015 under the platform of the People's Democratic Party (PDP). During his time in the Assembly, Fagbemi served as Chairman of the House Committee on Ethics, Judiciary and Privileges. He took part in legislative activities and contributed to debates on issues concerning Kwara State.
