= Sirajuddin =

Sirajuddin (Arabic: سراج الدين) may refer to:

- Munabbih ibn Kamil ibn Sirajud-Din Dhee Kibaar Abu-Abdullah al-Yamani al-San'ani, Persian companion of Muhammad
- Siraj al-Din al-Sakaki (1160–1228), Muslim scholar
- Siraj al-Din al-Ushi (died 1179), Hanafi jurist
- Siraj al-Din Urmavi (1198–1283), Shafiʽi jurist
- Siraj al-Din al-Sajawandi (died c. 1203), Iranian linguist
- Siraj al-Din Qumri (died 1227), Iranian poet
- Siraj al-Din Dhabyan (fl. 1291), Egyptian military leader
- Usman Serajuddin (1258–1357), Bengali scholar
- Siraj al-Din al-Mulaqqin (1323–1401), Egyptian-Andalusian hadith scholar
- Siraj al-Din al-Bulqini (c. 1324–1403), Egyptian scholar
- Siraj al-Din al-Makhzumi (1391–1480), Arab scholar
- Siraj-ud-Din Ali Khan Arzu (1687–1756), Indian poet
- Abu Zafar Sirajuddin Muhammad Bahadur Shah Zafar, Bahadur Shah II (1775–1862), last of the Mughal emperors in India
- Uthman Sirâj-ud-Dîn Naqshbandi (1781–1867), Ottoman Sufi saint
- Muhammad Sirajuddin Naqshbandi (1879–1915), Pakistani Sufi cleric
- Hafeezudin Sirajuddin Moonshi (1895–1965), Indian Singaporean doctor
- Muhammad Uthman Siraj al-Din (1896–1997), Turkish Sufi militant
- Sirajuddin Kasimpuri (1901–1979), Bangladeshi writer and literary researcher
- Abu Bakr Siraj Ad-Din (1909–2005), English writer, Islamic scholar, and philosopher
- Fouad Serageddin (1910–1999), leader of Egypt's Wafd Party
- Serajuddin Ahmad, Indian politician
- Serajuddin Hossain (1929–1971), Bangladeshi journalist
- Muhammad Siraj-Din (born 1935), Pakistani wrestler
- Alamgir Muhammad Serajuddin (born 1937), vice-chancellor of the University of Chittagong
- Siraj Uddin Ahmed (born 1941), Bangladeshi government official, writer, politician and freedom fighter
- Abib Sarajuddin (born c. 1942) Afghan held in Guantanamo Bay detention camps, Serial Number 458
- Tuanku Syed Sirajuddin of Perlis (born 1943), Raja of Perlis, Yang di-Pertuan Agong of Malaysia
- Dewan Mohammad Sirajuddin Siru (1951–2013), Bangladeshi footballer
- Sirajuddin Ajmal (born 1958), Indian politician
- Ilham Arief Sirajuddin (born 1965), Indonesian mayor
- Sirajuddin Haqqani (born 1979), Afghan warlord
- Sirajeddine Chihi (born 1970), Tunisian footballer
- Sirajuddin Hamid Yousuf, Sudanese diplomat, Sudanese Ambassador to the Russian Federation
- Sirajuddin Muhammad "Din" Syamsuddin, Indonesian politician and formerly the Chairman of Muhammadiyah for two terms from 2005 to 2010 and 2010 to 2015.
- Sirajuddin Khan, Pakistani politician
- Mohammad Siraj Uddin Ahmed, Bangladeshi politician

== Locations ==
- Siraj al-Din neighborhood in Baghdad
- Siraj al-Din Mosque in Baghdad

== See also ==
- Siraj (name)
- Uddin
