= Tanbih al-Ghabi bi-Tabri'at Ibn 'Arabi =

Book by al-Suyuti in defense of Ibn 'Arabi

Tanbih al-Ghabi bi-Tabri'at Ibn 'Arabi (Arabic: تنبيه الغبي بتبرئة ابن عربي, lit. 'Warning to the Dolt/Fool Concerning Ibn 'Arabi's Vindication') is a booklet written by the Shafi'i-Ash'ari scholar Jalal al-Din al-Suyuti (d. 911/1505) as a response to the book Tanbih al-Ghabi ila Takfir Ibn 'Arabi (Arabic: تنبيه الغبي إلى تكفير ابن عربي, lit. 'Warning to the Dolt/Fool Concerning Ibn Arabi's Heresy/Apostasy') by Burhan al-Din al-Biqa'i (d. 885/1480) (Note: Burhan al-Din al-Biqa'i was a Shafi'i-Ash'ari scholar. Among his most important works are: Nudhum al-Durar fi Tanasub al-Ayat wa al-Suwar (an interpretation of the Qur'an), and Al-Nukat wa al-Fawa'id 'ala Sharh al-'Aqa'id (a commentary on the Sharh al-'Aqa'id al-Nasafiyya by al-Taftazani, which al-Suyuti have performed the Takhrij process of its Hadiths).) in which al-Suyuti defended Ibn 'Arabi (d. 637/1240) against his critics in general, and against accusations of heresy and unbelief by al-Biqa'i in particular. (Note: Muhammad b. Jum'a al-Haskafi (d. 895/1490) also wrote a book in response to the book by al-Biqa'i, entitled “Tiryaq al-Afa'i fi al-Radd 'ala al-Khariji al-Biqa'i”, in which he defended both Ibn 'Arabi and Ibn al-Farid.) Al-Suyuti said:

The scholars past and present have differed concerning Ibn 'Arabi, one group considering him a wali of Allah (saint of God or spiritual leader of Muslims) - and they are correct - such as Ibn 'Ata' Allah al-Sakandari and 'Afif al-Din al-Yafi'i, another considering him a heretic - such as a large number of the jurists - while others expressed doubts concerning him, among them al-Dhahabi in al-Mizan. Two opposed verdicts are reported from Shaykh 'Izz al-Din ibn 'Abd al-Salam, one attacking him, and one describing him as the Spiritual Pole (al-Qutb). What reconciles them is indicated by Shaykh Taj al-Din ibn 'Ata' Allah in Lata'if al-Minan, namely, that Shaykh 'Izz al-Din at the beginning acted in the fashion of jurists in passing quick judgment on the Sufis. When Shaykh Abu al-Hasan al-Shadhili went to pilgrimage and returned, he came to Shaykh 'Izz al-Din before entering his own house and conveyed to him the Prophet's ﷺ greeting. After that, Shaykh 'Izz al-Din humbled himself and began to sit in al-Shadhili's gatherings...

== Summary ==
In this book, al-Suyuti refuted the criticisms and accusations against Ibn 'Arabi, which, according to him, were caused due to misunderstandings and misinterpretations, (Note: In this regard, Ibn Kamal Pasha (d. 940/1534), a defender of Ibn 'Arabi, states that, "Unlike the people of Kashf (vision of the Unseen) and Batin (inward, esoteric or metaphorical), people of the Outward are unable to comprehend the intended meaning of some of issues in al-Fusus and al-Futuhat." Ibn 'Abidin (d. 1252/1836), in his Radd al-Muhtar (Answer to the Perplexed), writes that one of the main reasons Ibn 'Arabi is misunderstood is a lack of familiarity with his technical nomenclature. He declares: The Sufis work within a technical framework and mean by their terms things which are not known to the jurists (fuqahā'), so whoever attributes to them meanings which are known [among jurists] will consider them to be unbelievers.) or due to the distortion and alteration of Ibn 'Arabi's books and statements by the heretics and blasphemers. Al-Suyuti tried to demonstrate the veracity of the sainthood of Ibn 'Arabi and stated that, though Ibn 'Arabi was a great saint, but the reading of his writings should be forbidden to incompetent people and disciples ignorant of Sufi terminology.

Our shaykh, Shaykh al-Islam, the last remnant of the mujtahids, Sharaf al-Din al-Munawi replied, concerning Ibn 'Arabi, that silence was safest. And this is the stance that befits every truly Godwary person who fears for himself. For me, the last word concerning Ibn 'Arabi - and this is accepted neither by his contemporary admirers nor by his detractors - is that he be considered a wali, but reading his books is forbidden. — Jalal al-Din al-Suyuti, 'Tanbih al-Ghabi bi-Tabri'at Ibn 'Arabi'

Al-Suyuti cites from Ibn Hajar al-'Asqalani's list in Inba' al-Ghumr bi-Anba' al-'Umr (Tidings of the Abundance in the News of the Ages), the scholars who praised Ibn 'Arabi and/or considered him one of the righteous saints of God, such as the following: (Note: Among the Muslim scholars who also held a good opinion of Ibn 'Arabi are the following: 1. Ibn al-Najjar (d. 643/1245).; 2. Kamal al-Din ibn al-Zamalkani (d. 651/1253).; 3. Al-Baydawi (d. 685/1286).; 4. Al-Safadi (d. 764/1363).; 5. Al-Sharif al-Jurjani (d. 816/1413).; 6. Siraj al-Din al-Makhzumi (d. 885/1480) who said: "Our shaykh, Shaykh al-Islam Siraj al-Din al-Bulqini and likewise Shaykh Taqi al-Din al-Subki used to criticize the Shaykh (i.e. Ibn 'Arabi) in the beginning, then they changed their position after they realized what he was saying and the explanation of his intent."; 7. 'Abd al-Rahman al-Jāmī (d. 898/1492).; 8. Jalal al-Din al-Dawani (d. 907/1501).; 9. Zakariyya al-Ansari (d. 926/1520).; 10. Al-Sha'rani (d. 973/1565). Much of al-Sha'rani's work is dedicated to the defense of Ibn 'Arabi and to the popularization of his legacy. For example, al-Sha'rani's Al-Yawaqit wa al-Jawahir (The Rubies and Jewels) is a popular summary of Ibn 'Arabi's major writings and doctrines. Perhaps the huge influence and popularity of Ibn 'Arabi's ideas owe a great deal to their popularization in the writings of al-Sha'rani (d. 1565), 'Abd al-Karim al-Jili (d. 1408 or 1428), and other writers.; 11. Ebussuud Efendi (d. 982/1574).; 12. Ibn Hajar al-Haytami (d. 974/1567) in his al-Fatawa al-Hadithiyya.; 13. 'Abd al-Ra'uf al-Munawi (d. 1032/1622) who cited him over two hundred times in Fayd al-Qadir.; 14. Kâtip Çelebi (d. 1067/1657) who devoted a chapter on him in his Mizan al-Haqq fi Ikhtyar al-Ahaqq.; 15. Ibn al-'Imad al-Hanbali (d. 1089/1679).; 16. Niyazi Misri (d. 1105/1694).; 17. Isma'il Haqqi al-Brusawi (d. 1137/1725).; 18. 'Abd al-Ghani al-Nabulsi (d. 1143/1731) who wrote a detailed treatise in defense of Ibn 'Arabi, entitled Al-Radd al-Matin 'ala Muntaqis al-'Arif Muhyi al-Din (The Solid Reply to the Belittler of the Learned Muhyi al-Din).; 19. Murtada al-Zabidi (d. 1205/1791) who often quotes Ibn 'Arabi in his Ithaf al-Sada al-Muttaqin.; 20. Jamal al-Din al-Qasimi (d. 1332/1914) in his Qawa'id al-Tahdith.; 21. Badr al-Din al-Hasani (d. 1354/1935).; 22. Muhammad Zahid al-Kawthari (d. 1371/1951).)

- Ibn 'Ata' Allah al-Sakandari (d. 709/1309).
- Al-Yafi'i (d. 768/1367), a Shafi'i-Ash'ari scholar and Sufi from Yemen affiliated with the Qadiri order who wrote several works dedicated to bolstering and defending Sufism.
- 'Izz al-Din ibn 'Abd al-Salam (d. 660/1262), after his meeting with Abu al-Hasan al-Shadhili (d. 656/1258), he understood the real meaning of Ibn 'Arabi's symbolic utterances, and asked God's pardon for his former opinion about Ibn 'Arabi and acknowledged him an Imam of Islam.
- Siraj al-Din al-Hindi (d. 773/1371), a Hanafi-Maturidi scholar, who is perhaps best known for his commentary on both al-'Aqida al-Tahawiyya and al-Hidaya.
- Najm al-Din al-Bahi (d. 802/1400), a Hanbali scholar who was highly praised and respected by Ibn Hajji and Siraj al-Din al-Bulqini, as al-Sakhawi mentioned in his al-Daw' al-Lami' (The Shining Light).
- Isma'il ibn Ibrahim al-Jabarti (d. 806/1403), a Sufi scholar of the Qadiri order from Yemen, who was the teacher of 'Abd al-Karim al-Jili (d. 826/1422).
- Majd al-Din al-Fayruzabadi (d. 817/1414-15), the author of Al-Qāmūs al-Muḥīṭ who in his commentary on Sahih al-Bukhari often quotes Ibn 'Arabi's explanations.
- Shams al-Din al-Bisati (d. 842/1439), a Maliki chief judge (Qadi al-Qudah) of Egypt, who had some arguments and disputes with the Hanafi-Maturidi scholar 'Ala' al-Din al-Bukhari regarding Ibn 'Arabi.
- Shams al-Din ibn Najm (d. 801/1399); and several other scholars.

== Critical response ==
The Hanafi scholar Ibrahim al-Halabi (d. 956/1549) wrote a critical reply to al-Suyuti, entitled Tasfih al-Ghabi fi Tanzih Ibn 'Arabi (Arabic: تسفيه الغبي في تنزيه ابن عربي) against the latter's defense of Ibn 'Arabi.

== See also ==
- Tanbih al-'Uqul 'ala Tanzih al-Sufiyya
- List of Sunni books
- Muhyiddin Ibn Arabi Society
- Sufi literature
- Sufi studies
- History of Sufism
