= Al-Khasa'is al-Kubra =

15th-century Arabic book by Al-Suyuti

Kifayat al-Talib al-Labib fi Khasa'is al-Habib (Arabic: كفاية الطالب اللبيب في خصائص الحبيب) shortly known as al-Khasa'is al-Kubra (Arabic: الخصائص الكبرى) is an Islamic book written by Egyptian Muslim scholar Jalal al-Din al-Suyuti (1445–1505 CE). The book deals with the miracles attributed to Islamic prophet, Muhammad.

== Structure ==
The book is divided into two parts. The first part basically describes the various miraculous and extraordinary events related and attributed to Muhammad. These include events before his birth up to the Tabouk expedition. Notable among the miracles described in the first part of this book are:

- Events preceding his birth
- Events during his birth
- Events during his trip to Syria at age 12
- Quran as ultimate miracle
- Isra and Mi'raj
- Splitting of the Moon
- events during the Battle of the Trench

== See also ==
- Tafsir al-Jalalayn
- Dur al-Manthur
- History of the Caliphs
