= Seerat-e Mustafa =

Book by Idris Kandhlawi

- English cover
- Author: Idris Kandhlawi
- Original title: سیرت مصطفی
- Language: Urdu
- Subject: Sīrah
- Genre: Classical
- Published: 1941 (As per the İslâm Ansiklopedisi)
- Publication place: Pakistan
- English publication date: 2011
- Media type: Print
- ISBN: 9789695832417 English
- Dewey Decimal: 297.09

Seerat-e Mustafa (Urdu: سیرت مصطفیؐ) is a 20th-century prophetic biography authored in Urdu by Idris Kandhlawi. Grounded in authentic narrations and presented in a classical style akin to primary Arabic sources, the narrative responds to Siratun Nabi by Shibli Nomani, addressing certain theories proposed by Syed Ahmad Khan and Shibli Nomani with a degree of skepticism. Known for avoiding Western-influenced perspectives, the text systematically addresses objections raised against various segments of the prophetic biography.

== Opening context ==
The book was written to present a prophetic biography through hadiths, aiming to portray his life without introducing doubt or unnecessary interpretations. In the foreword of the book, the author critiques existing biographies, noting their influence by modern philosophy and European thinkers, which seeks to reconcile the prophet's actions with Western civilization, philosophy, and science. The author emphasizes the need for a biography that excludes distasteful narratives and avoids discomforting readers while refraining from interpreting hadiths for modern sensibilities or invalidating them through critical assessments of narrators.

Regarding the initial publication, there are discrepancies in opinions. One viewpoint suggests an initial release in 1956 from Lahore, later revised and published in 1979 in collaboration with Maktaba Islamiya Saudiyya and Maktaba Usmaniyya. Another opinion posits a 1961 first edition, with three volumes made public, and the fourth volume, completed in 1966, subsequently published. There is a 5-year gap between these perspectives. According to İslâm Ansiklopedisi, the initial volume was published in 1941, and the last volume was printed in Deoband in 1966, and the book was also published by Maktaba Ilmiyya Saharanpur. A recent publication is from 2003 by Faisal Publications in Pakistan.

== Volume synopsis ==
=== One ===
This volume comprises 19 chapters, beginning with an introduction on the necessity of the prophetic biography. It covers various aspects such as lineage, the Elephant companions incident, birth, the chest-splitting incident, secrets and wisdom, marriage to Khadija, Kaaba construction, revelation commencement, and the effects of prophethood. Additional topics include the reality of prophethood, predecessors, the proclamation of Islam invitation, the moon splitting miracle, first migrations, the year of sorrow, the Ta'if journey, the Night Journey incident, the beginning of Islam in Medina, Medina migration, and the Qibla change command. It also examines the prayers of Eid al-Fitr and Eid al-Adha.

=== Two ===
This volume examines eight key topics, including Jihad in the path of God, battles, expeditions, the revelation affirming the innocence of Aisha, the ruling on hijab, the invitation letter to world leaders for Islam, Islam's stance on slavery, the peace treaty of Hudaybiyyah, and other relevant themes. The author critically examines and challenges perceived inaccuracies attributed to Shibli Nomani in various sections. The majority of this volume focuses on the detailed analysis of the battles of Badr and Uhud.

=== Three ===
This is the longest volume, commencing with the Expedition of Dumat al-Jandal in the year 5 AH, encompassing significant events such as Battle of the Trench, Siege of Banu Qurayza, Invasion of Banu Lahyan, and Expedition of Dhu Qarad, along with various expeditions. It narrates the Pledge of the Tree, the Battle of Khaybar, the conquest of Fadak, the Battle of Mu'tah, the Conquest of Mecca, Battle of Hunayn, the Expedition of Tabuk, common delegations, the Farewell Pilgrimage, and events leading to the demise.

=== Four ===
This concise volume compiles prophecies from preceding prophets concerning the miracles of the Prophet, presenting a summary perspective on the subject. The initial miracle is linked to the Quran, the second to the hadith, and the third is credited to Muslim scholars.

== Reference materials ==
This book is structured around the compilation of hadiths, citing collections such as Kutub al-Sittah. The author, when discussing the post-Hijrah period, especially battles and biographies, referenced narrations from hadith books such as Sahih al-Bukhari and Sahih Muslim. Various sources were utilized, including Al-Khasa'is al-Kubra, History of the Prophets and Kings, and specific sections from Fath al-Bari by Ibn Hajar al-Asqalani, incorporating Aisha's narration. For the analysis of the beginning of revelation, the author extensively used biographical works like Al-Khasa'is al-Kubra, Al-Sirah al-Nabawiyyah, and Tafsir al-Tabari. Other sources include Al-Muntaqa Ibnu Jarud, Mizan al-Itidal, Al-Dur al-Manthur, Zad al-Ma'ad, Umdat al-Qari, Tafsir al-Qurtubi, Tafsir Ibn Kathir, Al-Shifa, Sharh al-Shifa, Sirat al-Halbiya, Al-Bidaya wa l-Nihaya, Kitab Tabaqat Al-Kubra, Usd al-ghabah, Izhar ul-Haqq, Sirat al-Nabi, Madarij an-Nabuwwat, Majma al-Zawa'id, Fath al-Qadeer, Aab-i Hayat, Sharh al-Mawahib al-Ladunniyyah, Al-Mustadrak ala al-Sahihayn, Dalâ'il al-Nubuwwa, Madaarij al-Salikin.

== Methodical design ==
It employs a writing style that combines narrative and authorial approaches, recognized for its juristic characteristics by Kehkashan Khanam, owing to its in-depth presentation of legal issues. The book extracts new meanings from hadith and Qur'anic verses. The author's primary aim is transparent information presentation, avoiding distortion or concealment to prevent misinterpretation. When discussing the Prophet's expeditions, the author emphasizes the jurisprudence of jihad, supplying a detailed understanding of its essence, types, conditions, and dispelling misconceptions for both Muslims and non-Muslims. An aspect of the author's methodology is the chronological organization of biographies and military expeditions, avoiding distinctions between major battles and minor skirmishes for a seamless narrative.

== Academic reception ==
It has received acclaim within academic circles for its approach, style, and distinctive presentation. Muhammad Zahiruddin, the biographer of Idris Kandhlawi, highlights the book's firmness, well-founded arguments, referencing, and clarity. Ashraf Ali Thanwi universally encourages readers to scrutinize its contents. Kehkashan Khanam from Aligarh Muslim University commends the authors for presenting a hadith-based biography in a hadith-like style. Ibrat Jahan, also from Aligarh Muslim University, acknowledges the book's utility and recognizes its challenges for those with a new perspective. Javid Ahmed Bhat, a scholar from the Islamic University of Science & Technology, describes it as a compilation embodying the essence of arabic sīrah literature. Ashraf Dockrat from the University of Johannesburg praises its thoroughness and balanced treatment of crucial subjects. Aaisha Khatoon, a scholar at Aligarh Muslim University, acknowledges its fame and uniqueness among Urdu biographies. Mohammad Talib Khan from Aligarh Muslim University endorses it as an excellent sīrah. Ishtiaque Ahmad from Maulana Azad National Urdu University expresses high regard for its importance. Hafeez Ullah Khattak from Qurtuba University commends the authors' distinctive approach, emphasizing its value for researchers in the field of Prophetic biography.

== Press reviews ==
It has received acclaim from various press outlets. Amader Shomoy appreciates the book's arrangement. Daily Inqilab highlights its popularity among Bengali speakers. Shomoyer Alo underscores the book's examination of fiqhi issues with documentary evidence. Kaler Kantho commends the informative nature of this biography and the presentation of compliant explanations. Islam Time praised the presentation and the book's commitment to using authentic narrations, coupled with a strong rebuttal of criticism through evidence and arguments.

== Translations ==
Cover of the 2004 Bengali version by the Islamic Foundation Bangladesh

The book has been translated into Bengali by various translators. The first translator, Ubaidul Haq, has an unavailable translation. Another translation is accessible through Muhiuddin Khan's Madina Publications. Hemayet Uddin has also translated the book, published by Bud Comprint & Publications. The Islamic Foundation Bangladesh, under the Government of Bangladesh, initiated a translation project. The English version, published in 2011 by Zam Zam Publishers and Madrasah Arabia Islamia, was translated by Muhammed Kadwa. An abridged version by Jamiatul Ulama KZN's Talimi Board is available in a single volume.

== Legacy ==
The book functions as a tool for resolving discussions related to hadith, particularly in the interpretation of specific events within the second volume of Sahih al-Bukhari. In 2022, researchers Munir Ahmad, Hafiz Waqas Khan, and Hafeez Ullah Khattak jointly published a research paper on the methodology of this book.

== See also ==
- Deobandi sirah literature
