= Süleyman Ateş =

Turkish theologian, philosopher, and writer

Prof. Dr. Süleyman Ateş

Personal life
- Born: 3 January 1933 (age 93) Tadım, Elazığ, Turkey
- Main interest(s): Tafsir, Sufism
- Notable works: Modern Interpretation of The Quran (1988-1992); The Quran Encyclopaedia (2003)
- Education: Ankara University
- Website: suleyman-ates.com

Religious life
- Religion: Islam
- Denomination: Quranism

Muslim leader
- Influenced by: Niyazi Misri, Ibn Taymiyya

Süleyman Ateş (born 3 January 1933) is a Turkish theologian, philosopher, and writer.

He was 12th Director of religious affairs of Turkey. He graduated at Ankara University and passed out the highest degree. He attended an assistant program in the same university. He searched some studies in his field in Ruhr-University Bochum. He taught Commentary of Quran and Quran receding in Imam Muhammad ibn Saud Islamic University and Al-Emir Abdulkadir University Algeria. He served as the head of the department of Elemental Islamic Sciences at Ondokuz Mayıs University and as the head of Elemental Islamic Sciences in the Faculty of Theology in Istanbul University. Suleyman Ateş was assigned to department of Religious Affairs as director where he served for 5 years approximately.

== Early life and education ==
He was born in Tadim situated 15 km south of Elazığ to Ibrahim and Behiye Ateş. His father who was illiterate, sent him to Village Imam for his Quran education. He memorised all Quran when he was 10 and his father sent him to Elazığ for his Arabic studies. After he developed his Arabic, he went to Erzurum City in 1951 and was educated by Haci Faruk. He got married in 1952. He wanted to study in Al-Azhar University in Egypt and he attempted unsuccessfully to go to Egypt in 1953. After his unsuccessful try, he enrolled Vocational Religious High School in Elazığ City. Both he was studying in his school and he was being educated by 'Hacı Muharrem'. He was very successful during his education. He finished his high school in 1960 and he went up to the Faculty of Theology at Ankara University. During his education he served as an Imam and preacher in two different mosques for four years.

Suleyman Ateş who graduated from his school with the highest degree, served a couple of months in vocational Religious High School in Elazığ and he got through to Ankara University as Assistant Lecturer on 7 July 1965. He attended a Ph.D program in 1968.

== Career ==
He served in the Turkish Army as a reserve officer in the artillery battalion in 1969. He went back to work in Ankara University and he graduated from Ankara Language School and learned English. Suleyman Ateş went to Iraq for researching some studies in his field. He came back to Turkey after his research in Iraq and Egypt and he was employed as an assistant professor in Ankara University on 24 November 1973. Suleyman Ateş was assigned as the head of religious affairs for the Republic of Turkey. He served in his duty between 1976 and 1978 years and he went back to work at Ankara University. He was admitted as professor in Ankara University in 1978. Afterwards he was sent to West Germany on 27 April 1979.

Suleyman Ateş researched some studies in Ruhr University Bochum in his field and kept on studying German. He was invited by Imam Muhammad ibn Saud Islamic University and he went to Riyadh. He taught commentary on the Quran in the faculty of Usuluddin at the same university. He resigned from his position because the administration did not extend his work permit in the faculty and he went back to Ankara on 18 November 1982. He served as a dean of the faculty of theology in Ankara University for a while. Next semester, S. Ateş went to Imam Muhammad ibn Saud Islamic University served in this university until 1987. Following this, he taught Commentary of the Quran at that University then he was invited to Algeria, where he taught Comantary of Quran and Islamic Sufism at Al-Emir Abdulkadir University in Qosantina in 1987–1988.

Suleyman Ateş came back to his country Turkey, served as a head of department of Fundamental Islamic Studies in Ondokuz Mayıs University until 1995. After serving in Ondokuz Mayıs University, he was assigned as a faculty member to the department of theology in Istanbul University. He was appointed to Head of the department of Fundamental Islamic Studies in 1996. Suleyman Ateş also taught in the Department of Theology at Marmara University in second semester of the year 1996. He was retired in 1999.

He went to the Netherlands, taught there Islamic sciences at the European Special University, then became director of the same university for a while, 2001–2002. Then he returned to Turkey, to comply his researches and studies.

== Publications ==
Suleyman Ateş who produced 107 books and more than 1000 articles, among his most famous books are The Holy Quran and Turkish Translation of the Quran and Modern Interpretation of The Quran. Ateş published the last volume of The Quran Encyclopaedia in 2003 which is 33 volumes. Scientist Ateş considers in the Encyclopaedias: the matters in all its bearings with a book set containing alphabetically and chronological arranged information on many subjects in his grand book.

He wrote in the newspaper Vatan and he finished writing from this newspaper in 2011. He still writes his thoughts and also responds his reader's questions in his own web site. Suleyman Ateş also gives conferences on Islamic thought around the world.

Government offices
Preceded by Lütfi Doğan	President of Religious Affairs of Turkey; 1976 – 1978	Succeeded by Tayyar Altıkulaç
