= Nur al-Din al-Samhudi =

Sunni Islamic scholar

Imam Nur al-Din al-Samhudi
- نور الدين السمهودي
- Title: Nur al-Din; Al-Ḥāfiẓ

Personal life
- Born: Samhud, Egypt, Mamluk Era 1466
- Died: 1533 (aged 66–67) Medina, Ottoman Empire
- Era: Late Middle Ages
- Region: Egypt, Hejaz, Palestine (region)
- Main interest(s): Islamic history, Islamic jurisprudence, Hadith
- Notable work: Wafa al-Wafa bi Akhbar Dar al-Mustafa
- Occupation: Scholar, Historian, Jurist, Muhaddith, Mufti

Religious life
- Religion: Islam
- Denomination: Sunni
- Jurisprudence: Shafi'i
- Creed: Ash'ari

Muslim leader
- Influenced by: Al-Shafi'i Abu Hasan al-Ash'ari Al-Sakhawi Jalal al-Din al-Mahalli Sharaf al-Din al-Munawi Zakariyya al-Ansari

Nur al-Din Ali ibn Abd Allah ibn Ahmad al-Hasani al-Samhudi (Arabic: علي بن أحمد السمهودي), better known as Nur al-Din al-Samhudi (Arabic: نور الدين السمهودي) was an Arab Sunni Islamic scholar from the 15th century. He was a well-known Shafi'i jurist, hadith scholar, mufti and historian of Medina. He is best known for his history of the city of Medina entitled Wafa al-Wafa bi Akhbar Dar al-Mustafa. He is known to be the last person to enter and clean the Inner Chamber of the prophet Muhammad's grave.

== Lineage ==
His pedigree can be traced back to 'Ali b. Abi Talib. He is Nur al-Din Abu al-Hasan 'Ali b. 'Abd Allah b. Ahmad b. 'Isa al-Hasani al-Shafi'i. His family was well-known for their knowledge and prestigious lineage. He was a Hasani Hashimi Qurashi.

== Life ==
Al-Samhudi was born in Samhud in the year of 833 AH/1429 CE. Samhud is a large village on the Nile’s western shore in Upper Egypt.

The first teacher of al-Samhudi was his father, Al-Qadi 'Abd Allah al-Samhudi, Sayyid Samhudi's father. When al-Samhudi was young, he committed the Holy Qur'an, Minhaj al-Talibin by Imam al-Nawawi, and other literature to memory. His father had given him access to several hadith books, including Sahih al-Bukhari and al-Mundhiri's condensed version of Sahih Muslim.

In legal theory, Samhudi studied Ibn al-Subki's Jam' al-Jawami'. And in jurisprudence, he studied al-Mahalli's Kanz al-Raghibin and Sharh al-Bahjah amongst other books. This he all did before the age of 22. Samhudi made multiple trips to Cairo in order to learn knowledge. He journeyed there both with his father and on his own.

In Cairo, he studied under Jalal al-Din al-Mahalli, Sharaf al-Din al-Munawi Shaykh al-Islam Zakariyya al-Ansari, Ibn Imam al-Kamiliyyah, Ibn Qadi 'Ajlun, Muhammad b. Ahmad al-Jawjari, Muhammad b. Ahmad al-Bami, and many others. He read a great deal of Islamic literature on a wide range of subjects under these teachers.

In the year 873 AH, he travelled to Medina and studied with a number of ulama in the Prophet's Mosque, obtaining ijaza from them. He visited Jerusalem and stayed there for some time studying under local scholars from Al-Aqsa Mosque. In 870, al-Samhudi and his mother also made a trip to Mecca. They took the maritime route. He studied Hadith under al-Sakhawi in Mecca as well as studying under scholars in Masjid al-Haram.

873 was the year that al-Samhudi returned to Medina and became a permanent resident. He would become the head of scholars in Medina, representing as their mufti by issuing fatwa's and was the teacher at the Prophet's Mosque. Many students would attend his lessons. Following a life devoted to worship, learning, teaching, writing, and study, Samhudi died on Thursday, the 18th of Dhu al-Qadah, 911 AH (1533 CE).

== Works ==
Al-Samhudi authored a profound number of works on a range of subjects including jurisprudence, hadith and history. From them are:

- Wafa al-Wafa bi Akhbar Dar al-Mustafa was and still is the most referred historical account of Medina.

He wrote a supplementary note on Rawdat al-Talibin by Imam al-Nawawi. This book, along with his Hashiyah (supplementary note) on Imam Nawawi's al-Idah fi al-Manasik, is sometimes quoted by later authorities in the Madhhab.

- Durar al-Sumut fima lil-Wudu’ min al-Shurut, a jurisprudential work regarding impurities.
- Tayyib al-Kalam bi Fawa’id al-Salam
- al-Anwar al-Saniyyah fi Ajwibat al-As’ilat al-Yamaniyyah
- al-‘Iqd al-Farid fi Ahkam al-Taqlid
- Al-Samhudi's Fatawa collection

Most of his other works were lost in the fire that broke out in the Prophet’s Mosque in the year 886 AH.

== See also ==
- List of Ash'aris
