= Idris Kandhlavi =

Pakistani Islamic scholar

Muhammad Idris Kandhlawi محمد ادریس کاندھلوی

Personal life
- Born: August 20, 1899 Bhopal, Bhopal State (present-day Bhopal, Madhya Pradesh, India)
- Died: 28 July 1974 (aged 74) Kandhla, Uttar Pradesh
- Resting place: Kandhla
- Main interest(s): Hadith, Tafsir
- Notable work(s): Maarif al-Quran; Seeratul Mustafa; Al-Taleeq al-Sabeeh ala Mishkat al-Masabih
- Education: Mazahir Uloom Saharanpur; Darul Uloom Deoband
- Occupation: Islamic scholar, writer, teacher

Religious life
- Religion: Islam
- Denomination: Sunni Islam
- Jurisprudence: Hanafi
- Tariqa: Chishti; Naqshbandi Mujaddidi
- Movement: Deobandi

Muslim leader
- Disciple of: Khalil Ahmad Saharanpuri
- Students: Azizul Haque Shamsuddin Qasemi
- Influenced by: Ashraf Ali Thanwi, Khalil Ahmad Saharanpuri, Anwar Shah Kashmiri, Shabbir Ahmad Usmani

Muḥammad Idrīs ibn Muḥammad Ismā‘īl Ṣiddīqī Kāndhlawī (Urdu: محمد ادریس بن محمد اسماعیل صدیقی کاندھلوی; 20 August 1899 – 28 July 1974) was a Deobandi Islamic scholar particularly known as a scholar of hadith and tafsir (exegesis of the Qur'an). He held the post of Shaykh al-Tafsir at Darul Uloom Deoband in India and later migrated to Pakistan where he served as Shaykh al-Hadith wat-Tafsir at Jamia Ashrafia Lahore. Notable among his written works are Ma'ariful Qur'an, a tafsir of the Qur'an, Siratul Mustafa, a sirah (biography) of the Islamic prophet Muhammad, and at-Ta'liq as-Sabih, an Arabic sharh (commentary) on the hadith collection Mishkat al-Masabih. A graduate of both Mazahir Uloom Saharanpur and Darul Uloom Deoband, he studied under scholars including Khalil Ahmad Saharanpuri, Anwar Shah Kashmiri, and Shabbir Ahmad Usmani.

== Name and introduction ==
In the introduction to one of his works, he introduces himself as "Hafiz Muhammad Idris ibn Maulana Hafiz Muhammad Ismail Kandhlawi, Siddiqi by nasab (lineage), Hanafi by madhhab (school of jurisprudence), and Chishti by mashrab (spiritual disposition, lit. 'spring')." Elsewhere, in one of his Arabic works, he writes, "as-Siddiqi al-Faruqi by nasab, al-Bawfali by birth and origin, al-Kandahlawi by home, al-Hanafi by madhhab, an-Naqshbandi, al-Mujaddidi."

He was Siddiqi on his father's side, tracing his ancestry to Abu Bakr as-Siddiq, while on his mother's side he was Farooqi, claiming descent from Umar ibn Khattab. Thus he referred to himself as both Siddiqi and Faruqi. He adhered to the Hanafi school of fiqh (Islamic jurisprudence) and his tariqah (order) in Sufism was the Chishtiyah Sabiriyah, which incorporates several orders, including the Naqshbandiyah Mujaddidiyah. He was born in Bhopal and so he was "al-Bawfali" (Urdu: Bhopali). However he is commonly known by the nisbat "Kandhlawi", referring to his home, Kandhla, a north-Indian town known for producing many Islamic scholars. A descendant of Mufti Ilahi Bakhsh Kandhlawi, his nasab (patronymic) is as follows: Muḥammad Idrīs ibn Muḥammad Ismā‘īl ibn Muḥammad Isḥāq ibn Muḥammad Abul-Qāsim ibn Ilāhī Bak͟hsh.

== Birth and early life ==
Idris was born on 12 Rabi ath-Thani 1317 AH (c. 20 August 1899), the son of Maulana Muhammad Ismail Kandhlawi (d. 1942), in Bhopal, capital of the princely Bhopal State. Ismail, an Islamic scholar and a disciple of Haji Imdadullah Muhajir Makki, worked in Bhopal in the State's Forest Department. When Idris was a few years old, Ismail resigned from his post and began teaching hadith in the Jami Masjid in Kandhla. Idris grew up in a religious household. It was common for even the women in the family to know the Qur'an by heart. As per the family tradition, Idris memorized the Qur'an, completing it with his father at the age of nine in Kandhla.

== Education ==
After Idris completed hifz (memorization) of the Qur'an, his father entrusted him to Ashraf Ali Thanawi for religious education at Khanqah Imdadiyah Ashrafiyah in Thana Bhawan. At the madrasah there he completed his primary education in the Dars-i Nizami curriculum with Thanawi as well as with Maulana Abdullah Gangohi. Then, as Madrasah Ashrafiyah only had arrangements for the primary curriculum, Idris was admitted to Mazahir Uloom Saharanpur for further training in the Islamic sciences. Thanawi himself took Idris to Saharanpur and presented him to Khalil Ahmad Saharanpuri. At Mazahir Uloom his teachers included Maulana Saharanpuri, Maulana Sabit Ali, Maulana Abdul Latif, and Maulana Zafar Ahmad Usmani. After completing dawrah of hadith he received his sanad-i faraghat (certificate of completion) at the age of 19.

Thereafter, Idris completed dawrah of hadith a second time at Darul Uloom Deoband, with scholars including Allamah Anwar Shah Kashmiri, Allamah Shabbir Ahmad Usmani, Mufti Azizur Rahman Usmani, Maulana Muhammad Ahmad Nanautawi, Maulana Habibur Rahman Usmani, and Sayyid Asghar Husain Deobandi. At Deoband his fellow students included Mufti Muhammad Shafi and Qari Muhammad Tayyib.

== Career ==
Idris spent the majority of his life in the service of institutions of Islamic learning. His career can be summarized as follows:

- 1921–1922: Madrasah Aminiyah Delhi
- 1922–1929: Darul Uloom Deoband
- 1929–1939: Hyderabad State
- 1939–1949: Darul Uloom Deoband in the post of Shaykh at-Tafsir
- 1949–1951: Jamiah Abbasiyah Bahawalpur in the post of Shaykh al-Jamiah
- 1951–1974: Jamia Ashrafia Lahore in the post of Shaykh al-Hadith wat-Tafsir

=== Madrasah Aminiyah ===
Upon completing his education, in 1921 / 1338 AH Maulana Idris was appointed to his first teaching post at Madrasah Aminiyah, Delhi. This was during the time of Mufti Kifayatullah Dihlawi's leadership at the madrasah. However, after only one year, Maulana Muhammad Ahmad Nanautawi, muhtamim (vice-chancellor) of Darul Uloom Deoband, and Maulana Habibur Rahman Usmani, na'ib muhtamim, (pro-vice-chancellor), invited Maulana Idris to teach at the Darul Uloom.

=== First stint at Darul Uloom Deoband ===
Idris began teaching at Darul Uloom Deoband in 1922. He was never assigned the elementary books; instead, the books initially assigned to him were Hidayah awwalin in Hanafi fiqh and Maqamat-i Hariri in Arabic literature. Later Idris was assigned to teach the hadith collection Mishkat al-Masabih. Tafsir al-Jalalayn was also his responsibility. Idris remained with the Darul Uloom for nine years. During this time he regularly delivered a lecture on the Qur'an after Fajr prayer in the madrasah's Naudarah building. Attended by both intermediate and advanced students, in these lessons difficult issues in tafsir, hadith, ilm al-kalam, and fiqh were discussed.

=== Hyderabad State ===
In 1929, due to disagreements with the Darul Uloom's leadership, Anwar Shah Kashmiri and Shabbir Ahmad Usmani left the madrasah followed by other teachers and students. Idris left Deoband, taking up a post in Hyderabad State, where he remained for approximately nine years. There, in addition to teaching, he engaged in the writing and compilation of various works, including at-Ta'liq as-sabih, an Arabic commentary on Mishkat al-Masabih in several volumes. He had access to the Asafiyah Library, where he made use of books including a rare manuscript of at-Turbashti's sharh (commentary) of Masabih as-Sunnah, said to be the only such manuscript in India at the time. Though much of his time in Hyderabad was spent in research and authorship he did continue to teach; he taught the hadith collection Mishkat al-masabih in its entirety several times. In Hyderabad State Idris had the opportunity to meet Muhammad Marmaduke Pickthall. The two lived across from each other for some time and would often engage in conversation regarding Islam. Other friends and contacts included Manazir Ahsan Gilani and Abdul Bari Nadwi, in whose gatherings many learned individuals would congregate. During his stay Idris also met Abul Ala Maududi and his brother Abul Khair Maududi, both with whom he remained in contact with until the end of his life.

=== Second stint at Darul Uloom Deoband ===
In 1936 and 1937 Idris was twice invited to take up a post at Madrasah Islamiyah Arabiyah in Dabhel, where Kashmiri and Usmani had shifted, but he refused both offers. However, in 1939 he was invited to take the post of Shaykh at-Tafsir at Darul Uloom Deoband by Usmani, who by then had returned to the Darul Uloom as sadr muhtamim (chancellor), and Qari Muhammad Tayyib, who was then muhtamim. Idris accepted, although the salary was less than half of what he was receiving in Hyderabad.

Thus in 1939 Idris returned to Darul Uloom Deoband as Shaykh at-Tafsir and remained there until 1949. In addition to teaching Tafsir Ibn Kathir and Tafsir al-Baydawi, the main books of the dawrah tafsir curriculum, he also taught Tafsir al-Jalalayn, Sunan Abu Dawud, and Tahawi. He also continued to conduct his regular Qur'an lecture.

=== Jamiah Abbasiyah Bahawalpur ===
After the independence of Pakistan in 1947, Shabbir Ahmad Usmani, who had migrated to Pakistan before independence, repeatedly called Idris to come to Pakistan. Idris finally decided to leave India in 1949, due to what he perceived as the worsening of conditions for Islam and Muslims in the country. In May 1949 he resigned from Darul Uloom Deoband and returned home to Kandhla. He received invitations from other institutions in India, which he refused. He was invited to take the post of Shaykh al-Hadith at Darul Uloom Hathazari in Chittagong, East Pakistan (present-day Bangladesh). Despite the high salary, he also refused this offer since he wished to migrate to West Pakistan.

In October 1949 Idris was invited to Jamia Abbasia in Bahawalpur, West Pakistan. Jamia Abbasia was an old university in the princely Bahawalpur State whose educational and administrative system was in need of reform. The State's Ministry of Education had requested Shabbir Ahmad Usmani in the capacity of chancellor (raʾīs al-jāmiʿah) and Idris as vice-chancellor (shaykh al-jāmiʿah). Idris assumed this post on 25 December. Apart from administrative responsibilities he taught Sahih al-Bukhari and Tafsir al-Baydawi. Usmani, however, fell ill shortly after arriving in Bahawalpur and died there in December 1949.

=== Jamiah Ashrafiyah Lahore ===
In August 1951 Idris resigned from Jamia Abbasia and went to the recently established Jamia Ashrafia Lahore at the request of Mufti Mahmud Hasan, the madrasah's founder and muhtamim. At Jamia Ashrafia he served as Shaykh al-Hadith wa-at-Tafsir and taught Sahih al-Bukhari, Jami at-Tirmidhi, and Tafsir al-Baydawi. He remained with the Jamia until the end of his life. He died in Lahore on the morning of 7 Rajab 1394 / 28 July 1974, and is buried there.

== Publication ==
- Maarif al-Quran
- Seeratul Mustafa
- Al-Taleeq al-Sabeeh ala Mishkat al-Masabih

== Legacy ==
In a Q&A on Darulifta-Deoband.com, he was acclaimed as an great commentator and hadith scholar.

== See also ==
- List of Deobandis
