= Claudina Rodrigues-Pousada =

Portuguese-French biochemist

- Born: 1941; Tadim, Portugal
- Died: 2021 (aged 79–80); Lisbon
- Education: University of Porto
- Alma mater: Institute of Physical and Chemical Biology
- Employer(s): Calouste Gulbenkian Foundation and New University of Lisbon
- Known for: Biochemistry
- Awards: 2009 "Figure of the Year" at IPCB; 2010 Seeds of Science
- Honours: Fellow of the American Association for the Advancement of Science

Claudina Rodrigues-Pousada was a Portuguese researcher in biochemistry. She was a research student at the Gulbenkian Institute of Science until 1973 and at the Institute of Physico-Chemical Biology (IBPC), Paris from 1973 to 1979 and Paris Diderot University. In 1979 she completed her PhD studies and in 1976 was employed by the Calouste Gulbenkian Foundation as an adjoint researcher at the Gulbenkian Institute of Science; in 1984 she was a senior researcher until 31 December 1999. In 2000 she moved to the Institute of Technology Chemical Biology as an invited full professor, where she launched the Genomics and Stress laboratory. She worked with yeast to examine how the fungi reacts to environmental stressors, such as iron, arsenic, and nitric oxide, and thus how these stressors regulate cellular homeostasis.

== Early life and education ==
Rodrigues-Pousada was born in 1941 in Tadim, Portugal, and died on 2 March 2021 in Lisbon.

She graduated from the University of Porto with a degree in Pharmacy in 1968, though she started in Mathematics. She was awarded her PhD in Biochemistry from the Institute of Physical and Chemical Biology.

== Awards and honors ==
In 1994 she was elected as a member of EMBO.

In 2009 Dr. Rodrigues-Pousada was awarded her university's "Figure of the Year" award.

In 2010 she received the Seeds of Science award.

In 2011 she was elected a Fellow of the American Association for the Advancement of Science.
