= Al-Damiri =

13th-century Egyptian Islamic scholar

- Title: Kamal al-Din; Al-Ḥāfiẓ

Personal life
- Born: 1341 CE Cairo, Mamluk Sultanate
- Died: 1405 (aged 63–64) Cairo, Mamluk Sultanate
- Era: Late Middle Ages (Mamluk era)
- Region: Egypt
- Main interest(s): Kalam (Islamic theology) Fiqh, Hadith, Arabic, Zoology
- Notable idea: Elaborate systematically Arabic zoological knowledge
- Notable work(s): Life of Animals (Ḥayāt al-ḥayawān al-kubrā, c.1371)
- Education: Al-Azhar University
- Occupation: Zoologist, Jurist, Scholar, Muhaddith, Theologian

Religious life
- Religion: Islam
- Denomination: Sunni
- Jurisprudence: Shafi'i
- Creed: Ash'ari

Muslim leader
- Influenced by: Al-Shafi'i Abu al-Hasan al-Ash'ari Jamal al-Din al-Isnawi Ibn Aqil Taj al-Din al-Subki Siraj al-Din al-Bulqini Zain al-Din al-Iraqi Ibn al-Mulaqqin
- Influenced: Taqi al-Din al-Fasi al-Maqrizi

Al-Damiri (1341–1405), the common name of Kamal al-Din Muhammad ibn Musa al-Damiri (Arabic: كمال الدين محمد بن موسى الدميري), was an Egyptian Shafi'i Sunni scholar, jurist, traditionist, theologian, and expert in Arabic from late medieval Cairo. He was best known for his writing on Muslim jurisprudence and natural history. Al-Damiri wrote the first known systematic work on zoological knowledge in Arabic, the Ḥayāt al-ḥayawān al-kubrā, c.1371.

== Life ==
Al-Damiri was born in 1341 (742 AH) in Cairo, where he lived, learned, graduated, and died. His family’s origins go back to the countryside of Lower Egypt, from the village of Damira, close to Samannud on the eastern or Damietta branch of the Nile in the Delta. Since his youth, he worked with his father in a sewing shop, and his love for animals continued to grow with him, along with his passion for science and other knowledge, which prompted his father to direct him to complete his religious studies at Al-Azhar University.

He mastered the sciences of theology, jurisprudence, hadith, Arabic, etc at al-Azhar under the leading scholars of his day, most notably Jamal al-Din al-Isnawi, Bahaā' al-Din al-Subki, Burhan al-Din al-Qirati, Abd Allah ibn Abd al-Rahman ibn Aqil, including the three marvels of his era, Siraj al-Din al-Bulqini, Zain al-Din al-Iraqi, and Ibn al-Mulaqqin.

His brilliance and distinction enabled him to become a professor; at Al-Azhar, he taught lessons on Saturdays; at Rukniyya, where he became the professor of tradition and lectured on hadith studies; at the ibn al-Baqri School in Bab al-Nasr, where he preached to people on Jumu'ah; and at Mosque of al-Zahir Baybars in the al-Husseiniyah neighborhood, where he used to give his lessons after Jumu'ah. He was a mystic, or Ṣūfī, who was renowned for his fasting, prayer, and asceticism. He made Hajj more than six times.

Among those who mentioned that they studied under Kamal al-Din al-Dumiri was the hadith scholar and historian, Taqi al-Din al-Fasi, the Shafi’i jurist, Ibn Imad al-Aqfahsi and the scholar and historian al-Maqrizi

== Works ==
Al-Damiri was a prolific writer and excelled in jurisprudence in which he wrote a commentary on the Minhāj al-Ṭalibīn of al-Nawawi. He excelled in the sciences of hadith, Arabic, and theology. However, he was best known in the history of literature for his Life of Animals (Ḥayāt al-ḥayawān al-kubrā, c.1371), which treats in alphabetic order of 931 animals mentioned in the Quran, the traditions and the poetic and proverbial literature of the Arabs. The work is a compilation from over 500 prose writers and nearly 200 poets. The correct spelling of the names of the animals is given with an explanation of their meanings. The use of the animals in medicine, their lawfulness or unlawfulness as food, and their position in folklore are the main subjects treated. Occasionally, long, irrelevant sections on political history are introduced.

The work exists in three forms. The fullest has been published several times in Egypt; a mediate and a short recension exist in manuscript format. Several editions have been made at various times of extracts, among them the poetical one by al-Suyuti, which was translated into Latin by Abraham Ecchelensis (Paris, 1667). Bochartus in his Hierozoicon (1663) used al-Damiri's work. There is a translation of the whole into English by Lieutenant-Colonel Jayakar (Bombay, 1906–1908).

Al-Damiri included in his Life of Animals an account of giraffes, which reflected heightened interest in this creature during the Mamluk era.
