= Life of Animals =

Book about animal's life by Al-Damiri

Ḥayāt al-ḥayawān al-kubrā
- Author: Al-Damiri
- Original title: حياة الحيوان الكبرى
- Language: Arabic
- Subject: Zoology, Islamic literature
- Genre: Encyclopedia
- Published: 14th century
- Publication place: Mamluk Sultanate
- Media type: Manuscript

Ḥayāt al-ḥayawān al-kubrā (The Life of Animals) is a comprehensive zoological encyclopedia written by al-Damiri. The book details the characteristics and stories of various animals, weaving together scientific facts, folklore, and moral lessons.

== Author ==
Al-Din Muhammad Ibn Musa al-Damiri (A.H. 745-808 / A.D. 1344-1405) was an eminent scholar known for his contributions to zoology and Islamic literature. A notable manuscript of his work is dated 24th Jumādā II 852 / 25th August 1448 (MS Ar. 25, I).

== Structure and content ==
Ḥayāt al-ḥayawān al-kubrā is celebrated for its alphabetical arrangement and polythematic approach, making it a rich source of knowledge for both scientific and cultural insights. It covers not only the physical and behavioral traits of animals but also their symbolic significance, drawing from a variety of sources including ancient texts and contemporary accounts.

== Influence and legacy ==
Al-Damiri's work is recognized for its impact on both Islamic and global zoological studies, thanks to his method of integrating scientific observation with literary and ethical perspectives.

=== Significance in Islamic culture ===
The book holds a special place in Islamic culture for its holistic approach to animal life, reflecting the interconnectedness of all creatures as viewed in Islamic thought. It has been referenced in numerous subsequent works, underlining its importance in the canon of Islamic zoological literature.

== Ḥayāt al-ḥayawān al-ṣughrá ==
"Ḥayāt al-ḥayawān al-ṣughrá" (The Lesser Life of Animals) is another work by al-Damiri, which is a shorter version of this more comprehensive "Ḥayāt al-ḥayawān al-kubrā." While the larger work covers a wide range of animals in great detail, the "Ḥayāt al-ḥayawān al-ṣughrá" focuses on a more concise collection of animals and their characteristics.
