= Siraj al-Din, Baghdad =

Old neighborhood in Baghdad, Iraq

Siraj al-Din سراج الدين
- Neighborhood
- Located in: Baghdad, Iraq
- Known for: Contains the tombs of several Islamic scholars; Souk al-Sadriyya
- Founder: Abbasid Caliphate
- Named for: Siraj al-Din al-Qazwini
- Time zone: UTC+3 (Arabian Standard Time)

Siraj al-Din (Arabic: سراج الدين), also known as al-Sadriyya (Arabic: الصدرية), is an old neighborhood located in Baghdad, Iraq. The neighborhood dates back to the Abbasid period and is located right next to Bab al-Sheikh, although it's notable for containing the mausoleum of the Muslim Shafi'i scholar Siraj al-Din al-Qazwini.

== Historical background ==
=== Golden age of Islam ===
==== Abbasid period ====
The current neighborhood sits on the Abbasid quarter "al-Ma'muniyya" (Arabic: المأمونية), named after the Abbasid Caliph al-Ma'mun. Although the area was the last section of the quarter, it was also a cemetery, al-Zarradin Cemetery. Al-Ma'muniyya extended northward until it reached modern day al-Shorja where the royal Abbasid Qasr al-Hasani was located, modern day al-Khulafa Mosque. Between them was also a street that was known as al-A'dham Street.

According to Iraqi historian Imad Abd al-Salam Rauf, the "Siraj al-Din" that the quarter was named after was a Shafi'i Sheikh named "Siraj al-Din Omar bin Ali al-Husayni al-Qazwini" who was buried "under the Caliphal supervision" in Bab al-Azj. Bab al-Azj was the original name of Bab al-Sheikh before the arrival of Abd al-Qadir al-Gilani. Although he also notes that the biography of Sufi scholar Siraj al-Din al-Makhzumi mentions that al-Makhzumi was buried alongside the previous Siraj al-Din, and that the name of the previous Siraj al-Din had already become well-known by his time, so that the neighborhood around them took his name. Regardless, a later mosque was built over the tomb of the original Siraj al-Din.

==== Al-Sadriyya ====
Al-Sadriyya is a neighborhood typically considered to be part of the wider Siraj al-Din quarter. Located between Siraj al-Din and Ra's al-Saqiyya, it was originally also part of al-Ma'muniyya. The name "al-Sadriyya comes from Sadr al-Din al-Harawi, a teacher at the Bashiriyya Madrasa who died in 677 AH. Sadr al-Din was buried in the neighborhood after his death, and a tomb still retains his name. Both Siraj al-Din and al-Sadriyya merged as one neighborhood over time.

=== Ottoman period ===
During the Ottoman period, the Mamluk viceroy of Baghdad Ḥassan Pasha ordered the first recorded construction of the Siraj al-Din Mosque. He also built a fountain and sabil that connected to canals, with water that rose from a waterwheel. The waterwheel was connected to the Tigris and located near the Sayyid Sultan Ali Mosque. The canals were later nicknamed "Sabil-Khana" by its people. By 1846, Siraj al-Din had eight passageways, some were dedicated to weavers working in the area. A notable passageway was named "al-Ma'nuniyya" which has no linguistic meaning in Arabic. Rauf suggests that the name was a possible corruption of the name al-Ma'muniyya, the old name of the neighborhood that had survived among its people hundreds of years later.

=== Modern period ===
In the 20th-century, most of the land of the neighborhood was demolished and incorporated into al-Khulafa Street and the land on which the Baghdad Municipality buildings and their associated facilities are located.

== Notable landmarks ==
=== Sadr al-Din Mosque ===
The Sadr al-Din Mosque is a mosque located behind the Baghdad Municipality buildings. It contains the tomb of Sadr al-Din al-Harawi, the namesake of al-Sadriyya.

=== Siraj al-Din Mosque ===
The Siraj al-Din Mosque is the most prominent landmark in the neighborhood and contains its namesake. It contains a small madrasa in which both rational and traditional sciences are taught. The entrance of the mosque is a portico that also connects to its courtyard, which contains the mausoleum of Siraj al-Din. The mosque still exists and has also been rebuilt in the 1970s. There's also a fabric market adjacent to it called Souk al-Bazzazin, which is an extension of Souk al-Sadriyya.

=== Souk al-Sadriyya ===
Souk al-Sadriyya is a notable market located near Siraj al-Din Mosque. It historically contained many livestock stores, coffeehouses, fabrics stores, and metalworkers. The souk contained the Nabka Café, which hosted cockfighting matches, although the coffeehouse no longer exists. The livestock were used to produce several Iraqi dishes such as pacha and other dishes that use spices.
