= The Book of Exposition =

15th-century Arabic erotic literature work

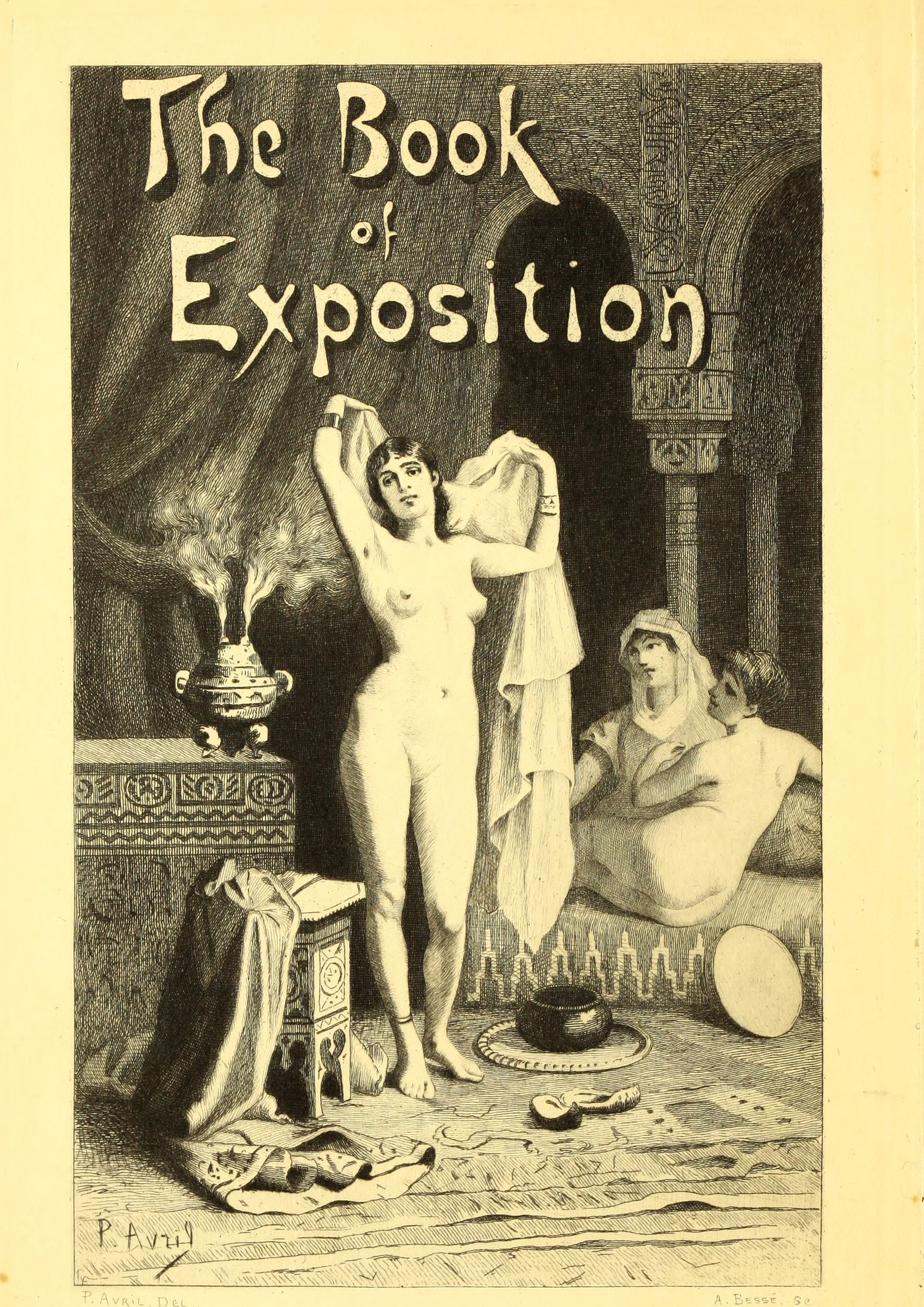
Frontispiece by P. Avril for the 1896 English translation

The Book of Exposition (Arabic: Kitab al-Izah Fi'ilm al-Nikah b-it-Tamam w-al-Kamal) is a 15th-century work of Arabic erotic literature credited to the Egyptian Muslim scholar Jalal al-Din al-Suyuti. The work consists of two dozen short stories of varying length exploring "promiscuity and sexual taboos under the societal constraints of the Arab-Islamic world".

== Contents ==
Among the feature tales is "The Strange Transformation that Befell a Certain Believer's Prickle", which tells of a man granted three divine wishes. On learning of the wishes, his wife urges him to use one to lengthen his "instrument", but upon the wish being granted his penis becomes "as straight as a column", rigid and permanently erect, displeasing his wife. The man then wishes for his condition to be reversed and his penis all but disappears. He is forced to use his third and final wish to return himself to normal.

Others are "The Pious Woman and What Happened to Her From Behind", "The Lascivious Savant", "The Bath Keeper Who Lent His Wife", "The Lady and the Barber", and so on.

== Translations and editions ==
The work was first translated into English in 1886 by Charles Carrington a British publisher of erotica, who titled it Marriage-Love and Woman amongst the Arabs.

The first effort to contextualise the work was the 1896 edition by Maison d’Editions Scientifiques, which included a foreword by a translator known only as "An English Bohemian".

The 1896 edition also featured a section entitled "Excurses", including other short erotica and notes, including "Holes in Walls", "Forty-eight Erotic Postures", "The Man on His Back", "The Woman Riding" and "On the Legitimacy of Widow-Mounting". It also included the 1885 essay by Sir Richard Francis Burton on pederasty from his Arabian Nights translation.
