= Al-Haba'ik fi Akhbar al-Mala'ik =

Collection of hadiths by al-Sayuti

al-Haba'ik fi Akhbar al-Mala'ik is a collection of hadiths by Jalal al-Din al-Suyuti.

The text has been translated to English by Stephen Burge.

== See also ==
- Angels in Islam
