= Nawadir al-Ayk =

14th-century Arabic sex education manuscript

Nawāḍir ʾal-ʾAyk fī Maʿrifat al-Nayk (Arabic: نواضر الأيك في معرفة النيك, "The Thicket's Blooms of Gracefulness on the Art of the Fleshly Embrace") is an Arabic manuscript allegedly attributed to Islamic scholar Al-Suyuti in the late fifteenth century, a summary of an earlier one written by the author, Al-Wishāḥ fī Fawāʾid al-Nikāḥ. The book is one of many books on the same subject attributed to the author, such as Shaqāʾiq al-Utrunj fī Raqāʾiq al-Ghunj.

== Subject ==
Most of the chapters of the book deal with sex education as showing various sex positions and giving advice that told by whom were considered as experts on these subjects. The other chapters contain poetry (usually happens to be short) and urban tales, mostly using explicit and vulgar words and some are attributed to well-known figures such as Abu Nuwas, Ibn al-Rumi, Al-Asmaʿi and Al-Ṣafadī. Some old Arab scholars classified this kind of books as 'Ilm al-Bah ("The Art of Coition"). The book also has some chapters relating tales about homosexuals and eunuchs, but in most occasions the author tries to depict the mainstream preferences of adult men at the time.

== Author controversy ==
Regarding the sensitive and explicit subjects mentioned in the book, some modern Islamic scholars condemn and believe it is impossible to accredit the manuscript to Al-Suyuti, who is considered one of the most important figures in the literature of Sunni Islam. Some claim the attribution of the book is forged, and it was a scheme made by an anonymous writer to give the book authenticity to sell more copies. Other opinions say he may had this book written but at least he must have renounced it before he died. Though, there are some scholars who agreed to credit the book to Al-Suyuti.

The title is not mentioned in the author's own bibliography list. However, it is indexed in some old major resources like Kâtip Çelebi's Kashf al-Ẓunūn ‘an Asāmī al-Kutub wa-al-Funūn and Ismail Pasha al-Baghdadi's Hadiyat al-ʻArifīn.
