= Shaqa'iq al-Utrunj fi Raqa'iq al-Ghunj =

14th-century Arabic sex education manuscript

Shaqāʾiq al-Utrunj fī Raqāʾiq al-Ghunj (Arabic: شقائق الأترنج في رقائق الغنج, lit. 'Halves of the Lemon Regarding the Intricacies of Coquetry') is a manuscript allegedly written by Islamic writer Al-Suyuti in the late fourteen century. The book is one of many books dealing with sex written by the author, such as Nawāḍir al-Ayk fī Maʻrifat al-Nayk and Al-Wishāḥ fī Fawāʾid al-Nikāḥ.

The book was published for the first time in 1988 by Syrian publisher Dār al-Maʻrifah.
