= Al-Wishah fi Fawa'id al-Nikah =

15th-century Arabic sexology manuscript

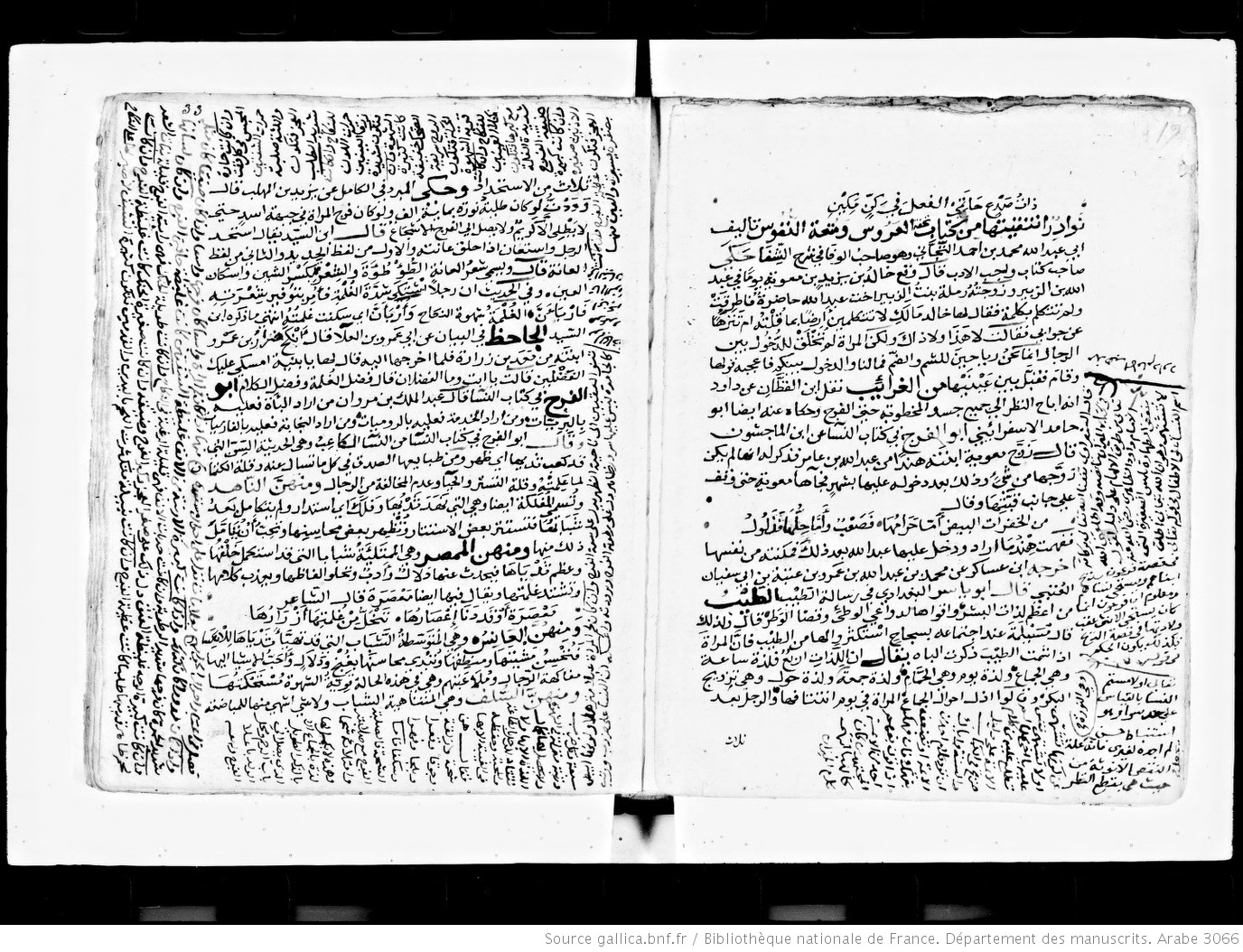
Pages from MS. Arabe 3066 with extensive marginal notes.

Al-Wishāḥ fī Fawāʾid al-Nikāḥ (Arabic: الوشاح فی فوائد النکاح, The Sash on the Merits of Wedlock) is an Arabic literary work of sexology and sex education written by the Egyptian Muslim scholar Jalal al-Din al-Suyuti in the late 15th century. It has been called the apex of its genre of Islamically based sex and marriage manuals in Arabic, a form of literature that originated in 10th-century Baghdad. The work is one of a number of such works written by Al-Suyuti dealing with sex, the others including Nawāḍir al-Ayk fī Maʻrifat al-Nayk, Nuzhat al-Mutaʾammil, and Shaqāʾiq al-Utrunj fī Raqāʾiq al-Ghunj.

== Name ==
The Arabic title Al-Wishāḥ fī Fawāʾid al-Nikāḥ (الوشاح فی فوائد النکاح) is usually translated as "The Sash on the Merits of Wedlock". The pairing of wishāḥ and nikāḥ is an example of rhyming prose in Arabic literature, a tradition known as saj'. The key Arabic term in the name is nikāḥ, which particularly covers Islamic marriage bound with a formal contract although also covering matrimony and wedlock more generally; its poetic pair wishāḥ is used for sashes, bands, and ornamented belts but also for headscarves and can be used figuratively for any tie or bond. The Swedish medievalist Pernilla Myrne holds that the title was meant by Al-Suyuti to clearly indicate that Al-Wishāḥ restricts itself to Islamic law and tradition rather than sexual pleasure and relationships more generally. In Arabic, the title is sometimes prefaced with kitāb (the Arabic word for "book"), as Kitāb al-Wishāḥ fī Fawāʾid al-Nikāḥ. In the 19th century, the name was very loosely translated into English as "The Book of the Zone on Coition-boon" by the explorer Richard Burton.

== Composition ==
Al-Wishāḥ was written at some point in the late 15th century by Al-Suyuti (c. 1445 – c. 1505). It was a continuation of a pre-existing genre of Arabic sex and marriage manuals tempered for Islamic audiences, a literary form that originated in 10th-century Baghdad under the influence of translations of Greek, Persian, and Indian works on the subjects of medicine and erotology. Al-Suyuti's other works on similar subjects were the Nawāḍir al-Ayk fī Maʻrifat al-Nayk, Nuzhat al-Mutaʾammil, and Shaqāʾiq al-Utrunj fī Raqāʾiq al-Ghunj.

In Al-Wishāḥ, Al-Suyuti "attempts to reconcile the earliest erotological tradition with the Islamic sciences", resulting in "an extensive investigation of the sexual pleasures permitted for Muslims—particularly men, but also, to a certain degree, women", according to Pernilla Myrne, who notes that Al-Suyuti was more successful in consistently reconciling earlier works than his predecessors. The female aspects of sexual behavior and obligations in Islam are also covered in greater detail by Al-Suyuti in Shaqāʾiq al-Utrunj and Nuzhat al-Mutaʾammil, both of which overlap with Al-Wishāḥ in terms of their sourcing.

Al-Suyuti acted largely as a compiler in the production of Al-Wishāḥ, arranging hadiths and historical anecdotes from earlier works while adding little commentary. However, in the arrangement of the material on the major themes, such as marital sex (faḍl al-nikāḥ), ideal masculinity, and ideal femininity, Myrne notes that Al-Suyuti's "focus on and combination of specific parts of the erotic heritage is quite unique".

At its core, Al-Wishāḥ combines the input of two important but quite opposite works in the sex manual tradition: the 10th-century Encyclopedia of Pleasure and the 14th-century Tuḥfat al-ʿArūs wa-Nuzhat (or Mutʿat) al-Nufūs. The Encyclopedia of Pleasure was a "quite libertine" work strongly influenced by Indian erotology and produced by Ali ibn Nasr al-Katib, an author with Shiite inclinations while the latter, the Tuḥfat al-ʿArūs, was a more traditional Islamic marriage manual based on hadiths by the Sunni Hafsid Caliphate official Abdallah al-Tijani.

Al-Wishāḥ was developed as a union of these two contradictory but overlapping source texts. Another frequently quoted source in the work is the Rushd al-Labīb ilá Muʿāsharat al-Ḥabīb, a 14th-century work by the Yemeni author Aḥmad ibn Falītah.

== Contents ==
Despite the salacious nature of some of the source material, particularly the Jawāmiʿ al-Ladhdhah, Al-Wishāḥ addresses sex in the context of Islamic law and tradition and not sex for pleasure in general. It omits any mention of homosexuality or any other relationships or activities considered illicit in its day.

The work is divided into seven parts, covering hadiths and legal reports, sexual vocabulary, anecdotes and historical reports, anatomy, medicine, and coitus itself. The anatomy chapter includes concepts developed by Galen, such as that the uterus is an inverted scrotum, while much of the chapter on medicine is quoted verbatim from the sexual medicine work Kitāb al-Bāh by Abu Bakr al-Razi.

The overarching theme of Al-Wishāḥ is that sex is a gift from God, a sentiment common to "practically all premodern Arab-Islamic sex manuals". In the work's exploration of 'ideal masculinity', Al-Suyuti suggests that the best man is "the one with the most potency" while, in its exploration of 'ideal femininity', he focuses on marital obedience and suggests that the best woman is "both chaste and lustful".

Myrne writes that Al-Suyuti presents a "complex and ambiguous" vision of women that attempts to unite the sexually voracious portrayal of women in Abbasid erotica with the ideal woman in Islamic manuals based on the hadith tradition, with both Al-Ghazali and Al-Tijani being presented as major authorities within the work.

== Editions ==
One of the earliest known extant copies of Al-Wishāḥ is the Lala Ismail 577 manuscript dated to AD 1565–1566 (973 AH). Two copies are held by the French National Library in Paris as Arabe 3066 and Arabe 3067, and another by King Saud University in Riyadh as KSU 797.

A modern Arabic edition of Al-Wishāḥ was published in 2001 by the Dar al-Kitab al-ʻArabi publishing house in Damascus, Syria, as part of a series of nine prominent works on Arabic erotology entitled Adab al-jins ʻinda al-ʻArab ("Sexual literature of the Arabs). It is unclear which manuscript or manuscripts the text was based on.

== Legacy ==
Al-Suyuti is considered to have provided a "new and modernized version" of the earlier sexual science (ʿilm al-bāh) and reconciled it with an Islamic vision of sexuality, "opening up a wider range of sexual pleasures for believers, within legal bounds". Myrne has called it the "apex" of its genre of Islamically rooted sex and marriage manuals in Arabic. While similar guides had been composed beginning in 10th-century Baghdad, and continued to be written after Al-Suyuti's death, none drew from the same breadth of Arab erotic heritage and the Islamic heritage as Al-Wishāḥ.
