= Badr al-Din al-Ayni =

Sunni Hanafi Islamic scholar (1360–1451 CE)

Badr al-Din al-'Ayni

Personal life
- Born: 30 July 1360 'Ayntāb, Mamluk Sultanate
- Died: 28 December 1451 (aged 91) Cairo, Mamluk Sultanate
- Era: Medieval era
- Region: Cairo

Religious life
- Religion: Islam
- Denomination: Sunni
- Jurisprudence: Hanafi
- Creed: Maturidi

Abū Muḥammad Maḥmūd ibn Aḥmad ibn Mūsā Badr al-Dīn al-ʿAynī, often quoted simply as al-'Ayni (Arabic: بدر الدين العيني, romanized: Badr al-ʿAynī; born 26 Ramadan 762 AH/30 July 1360 CE, died 855 AH/1453 CE) was a Sunni Islamic scholar of the Hanafi madh'hab and the Shadhili tariqa. Al-'Ayni is an abbreviation for al-'Ayntābi, referring to his native city. He was an eminent scholar regarded as one of the most influential Hanafi jurist and hadith scholar of his time.

== Biography ==
He was born into a scholarly family in 4 Dhū al-Ḥijjah 855 AH (30 July 1360 CE) in the city of 'Ayntāb (now Gaziantep in modern Turkey). He studied history, adab, and Islamic religious sciences, and was fluent in Turkish, his native tongue, which distinguished him from his contemporaries and helped him in his pursuits. There is some evidence that he also knew at least some Persian. In 788 AH (1386 CE) he travelled to Jerusalem, where he met the Hanafi shaykh al-Sayrāmī, who was the head of the newly established Zāhiriyah madrasah (school) and khānqah (Sufi retreat) in Cairo. Al-Sayrami invited al-'Ayni to accompany him home to Cairo, where he became one of the Sufis of the Zāhiriyah. This was a step upward for the young al-'Ayni, as it represented entry into "an institution with ties to the highest level of the ruling elite."

He established a good reputation and initially met with favor. However, after al-Sayrāmī died in 790 AH (1388 CE), al-'Ayni became involved in a personal conflict with the amir Jārkas al-Khalīlī, who tried to run him out of Cairo. Al-'Ayni later described al-Khalīlī as arrogant and dictatorial – "a man pleased by his own opinion." He was saved from expulsion by one of his teachers, Siraj al-Din al-Bulqini, but prudently decided to leave for a time anyway.

From Cairo he went to teach in Damascus, where he was appointed muhtasib (overseer of sharia in the marketplace) by the amir, and returned to Cairo some time before 800 AH (1398 CE.)

Once back in Cairo, al-'Ayni strengthened his social and political position by associating with several amirs, making the Hajj with the amir Tamarbughā al-Mashtūb. He also had the patronage of the powerful amir Jakm min 'Awd, who was dawadār (literally "inkstand-holder": a secretary or confidential advisor) to the Sultan Barqūq. After the death of Barqūq, al-'Ayni became the muhtasib of Cairo, displacing the scholar al-Maqrīzī. According to al-Maqrīzī (an interested party) it was Jakm who obtained the post for al-'Ayni; however, the historian Ibn Taghribīrdī states that it was a cooperative effort by Jakm and two other amirs, Qalamtāy al-'Uthmānī and Taghribīrdī al-Qurdamī. In any case, this was the beginning of a lifelong feud between the two 'ulama' : "From that day on, there was hostility between the two men until they both died."

Al-'Ayni and al-Maqrīzī succeeded each other as muhtasib of Cairo several times over the next few years, probably a reflection of the power struggle between Jakm min 'Awd and al-Maqrīzī's patron, Yashbak al-Sha'bānī. Neither held the post for very long. In the reign of al-Nasir Faraj, Barqūq's son and successor, al-'Ayni was appointed to the "lucrative and prestigious" post of nāzir al-ahbas (overseer of pious endowments.) He would be dismissed from and reappointed to this post several times, finally securing it for good in the reign of Sultan Mu'ayyad Shaykh and keeping it until he was ninety-one.

Al-'Ayni's prestige grew as he aged. Mu'ayyad Shaykh named him ambassador to the Qaramanids in 823 AH (1420 CE.) Later in life he would be called upon to lecture on learned topics before the Sultan, sometimes reading history aloud in Arabic and explaining it in Turkish for the Sultan's benefit. Sultan al-Ashraf Barsbāy is reported to have said "Islam is known only through him" and law lā al-'ayntābi la-kāna fī islāmina shay', "If not for al-'Ayntabi there would be something suspect in our Islam." Barsbāy sometimes sent al-'Ayni as his representative to greet foreign dignitaries, apparently because of his fluency in several languages.

Barsbāy often turned to al-'Ayni for advice on legal matters, and named him chief Hanafi qadi (judge) in 829 AH (1426 CE.) He was dismissed from this post after three years; by his own report, both he and the chief Shafi'i qadi, Ibn Hajar al-Asqalani, were dismissed at the same time because their constant feuding was distracting them from their duties; though he adds that this was a calumny spread by his enemies at court. He was later reappointed.

In the reign of Barsbāy's successor, al-Aziz Jaqmaq, al-'Ayni was dismissed as chief Hanafi qadi again. He withdrew from court and concentrated on his scholarly writing. In 853 AH (1449 CE) he was dismissed as nāzir al-ahbas, probably because of failing memory. He died in 855 AH (1451 CE) at the age of ninety-three, having outlived all his children, and was buried in his own madrasah in Cairo.

== Works ==
- Umdat al-Qari
- 'Al-Bināyah sharḥ al-Hidāyah (commentary on an exposition of Ḥanafi law by al-Marghīnānī)
- al-Sayf al-Muhammad fī Sīrat al-Malik al-Mu'ayyad (a biography of the sultan Mu'ayyad Shaykh)
- 'Iqd al-Jūman fī Ta'rikh Ahl al-Zamán, translated to French as "Le collier des perles" ("The Pearl Necklace")
- ar-Rad al-Waafir (Arabic: الرد الوافر)
- 'Nukhab al-afkār fī tanqīḥ mabānī al-akhbār fī Sharḥ maʻānī al-āthār (commentary on an exposition of Ḥanafi law by al-Ṭaḥāwī)'
- Sharh Sunan Abu daud - published in Pakistan

== See also ==
- List of Islamic scholars
- List of Hanafis
- List of Ash'aris and Maturidis
