= 73 Sects (Hadith) =

Attributed to Muhammad

The hadith attributed to the Islamic prophet Muhammad and known as the hadith of 73 sects states that there will be 73 different sects and groups within Islam, and that only one of these groups will reach salvation or heaven, while the others will be destined for hell.

== The text ==
There are many variations of hadith. According to the famous version of it Jews will be divided into seventy-one groups and Christians will be divided into seventy-two groups, and one of these groups of members of both religions will enter heaven. Muslims will be divided into seventy-three sects, one of which will be in Paradise and seventy-two in Hell.(Sunan Ibn Majah 3992, Book 36, Hadith 67)

In another version of the hadith, only Jews are mentioned and similarly, it is stated that Muslims will be divided into seventy-three sects.(Jami` at-Tirmidhi 2640, Book 40, Hadith 36)

Scholars of major Islamic sects have commented that the sect that achieved salvation in this hadith is the sect to which they belong. For example, Sunni scholars such as Abū l-Ḥusayn al-Malaṭī, ‘Abd al-Qāhir al-Baghdādī, Abū l-Muzaffar al-Isfarā'inī, al-Shahrastānī, Sunnis were the saved sect, according to an Ismā'īlī scholar such as Abū Tammām al-Khawārizmī, Ismailis, according to important Mu'tazili scholar Qāḍī 'Abd al-Jabbār the sect that achieved salvation was the Mu'tazilites.

== Discussions ==
Islamic scholar Ibn Hazm did not see this hadith as authentic when viewed from the perspective of the sects that emerged in the history of Islamic thought. Another important hadith critic, Ibn al-Wazīr al-Yamānī (d. 840/1436), attributed the non-acceptance of this hadith by Bukhari and Muslim to the contradictions regarding the hadith text and did not consider the hadith as authentic.

Recently, some Muslim scholars have emerged who claim that this hadith does not belong to Muhammad but was produced later. One of these scholars is Shaykh Ninowy. According to Shaykh Ninowy this hadith is weak or fabricated.

Even if some Sufis accept this hadith, they associate salvation not directly with membership in an exoteric sect and adhering to a creed, but with a spiritual state reached through a mystical journey.

Commenting on a poem by the Turkish Sufi Niyazi Mısri, another Sufi, Muhammad Nuru'l Arabi, sees the sect that will be saved among the 73 sects as belonging not to members of a particular Islamic sect, but to those who have made their mystical journey and reached gnosis and thus become true humans.

Some Sufis seem to totally refuse or neglect the Hadith of 73 sects as an authentic hadith, and considered beliefs not only within Islam but also outside Islam as legitimate. Hallaj was one of the leading Sufis with this perspective. Hallac sees all religions as branches of the same tree and does not call anyone to any religion but says that everyone should seek the truth in their own religion.

== See also ==
- Islam
- Hadith
- Madhhab
- Religious exclusivism
- Sunnism
- Mu'tazilism
- Isma'ilism
- Perennial philosophy
- Hallaj
- Niyazi Misri (Sufi)
- Gnosis
