= Siraj al-Din Qumri =

Iranian poet (died 625 AH)

- سراج‌الدین قُمری
- Born: Amol, Iran
- Died: 625 AH; Tabriz
- Occupations: poet and author

Siraj al-Din Qumri Amoli or Siraj al-Din Qomri Amoli (Persian: سراج‌الدین قُمری آملی; born Amol, Iran, died 625 AH, Tabriz, Iran) was an Iranian poet. He was the teacher of Nasir al-Din al-Tusi.

The Diwan (poetry collection) of Siraj Qumri has thirteen thousand verses. It is now kept in the Chester Beatty Library in Ireland.
