= Siraj al-Din Mosque =

Mamluk mosque in Baghdad, Iraq

Coordinates: 33.3371°N 44.4035°E

- جامع سراج الدين

Religion
- Affiliation: Islam
- Branch/tradition: Sufism
- Ecclesiastical or organisational status: Active

Location
- Location: Al-Rusafa in Baghdad
- Country: Iraq

Specifications
- Dome: 2
- Minaret: 1

The Siraj al-Din Mosque (Arabic: جامع سراج الدين) is an old mosque that dates back to the Mamluk dynasty in Baghdad, Iraq, during the time of Ottoman viceroy Hassan Pasha. The mosque is the namesake of the Siraj al-Din quarter. The mosque is located near the Hadhrat al-Qadiriyya.

== Historical background ==
=== Background ===
The namesake of the mosque and its neighborhood was a Muslim Shafi'i scholar named "Siraj al-Din Omar bin Ali al-Husayni al-Qazwini" who was buried "under the Caliphal supervision" in the area. Before the current name, the Siraj al-Din quarter was named "al-Ma'muniyya" in the Abbasid period. However, by the time of Siraj al-Din al-Makhzumi, another scholar also buried in the mosque and the name is generally attributed to, the matter of Siraj al-Din's tomb was well-known and the neighborhood was named after him.

=== Ottoman-Mamluk period (1701 - 1922) ===
In 1701, the Mamluk viceroy of Baghdad Hassan Pasha ordered the first recorded construction of the Siraj al-Din Mosque. He expanded the location with a fountain and sabil that connected to a canal that connected to the Tigris so that locals could drink and purify from it. The viceroy also constructed a madrasa for teaching both rational and traditional sciences and built classrooms for the enrolled students. A later sheikh, Abd al-Rahman al-Thunayyan, built another madrasa on top of it that also added Tajwid teachings. In the present day, no trace of the madrasas survives.

== Modern period ==
Although the madrasas don't exist anymore, the mosque, alongside its mausoleum, still exists, with reconstruction efforts materializing in the 1970s during the Ba'ath period. It's recognized as one of Siraj al-Din's most notable and prominent landmarks. There's also a fabric market adjacent to it called Souk al-Bazzazin, which is an extension of Souk al-Sadriyya.

In 1955, Iraqi architect Rifat Chadirji designed a modernist model for the mosque early in his career. Although it still contained Iraqi and Islamic architectural features, the building was simple and modernist in its form with a large archaic vault on the top instead of a dome. The arch referenced the arch of Taq Kasra at Ctesiphon. The plans never materialized but the design is considered important for Chadirij's evolution as an architect.
