= Sirajuddin Hamid Yousuf =

Sudanese diplomat

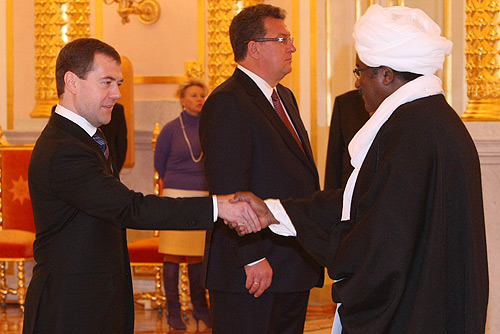
Sirajuddin Hamid Yousuf presents his Letter of Credence to President of Russia Dmitry Medvedev on 16 January 2009.

Sirajuddin Hamid Yousuf is a Sudanese diplomat and is the current Ambassador Extraordinary and Plenipotentiary of the Republic of Sudan to the Russian Federation, presenting his credentials to President of Russia Dmitry Medvedev on 16 January 2009.

Yousuf was elected as a member of the Sudanese National Assembly representing the constituency of Adila 78 of the state of southern Darfur and eventually presided over the Human Rights and Public Duties Committee of the Sudanese parliament.

Between 2001 and 2005, Yousuf served as the Ambassador of Sudan to Uganda, Burundi and Rwanda. Between 2006 and January 2008, Yousuf was the Director of the Department of Peace and Humanitarian Affairs, before being appointed as Director of the Crisis Management Department of the Sudan Ministry of Foreign Affairs.

Yousuf graduated from the University of Khartoum in April 1979, obtaining his master's degree (LL M) in International Law from the University of Pretoria (South Africa) in 2002.

== See also ==
Russia–Sudan relations
