= Siraj al-Din al-Bulqini =

12th century scholar of Islamic Jurisprudence

- Title: Shaykh al-Islām; Siraj al-Din

Personal life
- Born: 4 August 1324 CE / 724 AH Bulqina, Gharbia Governorate Egypt
- Died: 1 June 1403 CE / 805 AH Cairo
- Region: Egypt
- Main interest(s): Fiqh, Usul al-Fiqh, Sharia
- Notable work: Tashih al-Minhaj

Religious life
- Religion: Islam
- Denomination: Sunni
- Jurisprudence: Shafi'i
- Creed: Ash'ari

Muslim leader
- Influenced by: Al-Shafi'i Abu al-Hasan al-Ash'ari Al-Nawawi Siraj al-Din al-Makhzumi Taqi al-Din al-Subki
- Influenced: Ibn Hajar al-Asqalani Al-Mahalli Badr al-Din al-Ayni Al-Damiri Al-Suyuti
- Arabic name
- Personal (Ism): Umar
- Patronymic (Nasab): ibn Raslan
- Teknonymic (Kunya): Abu Hafs
- Epithet (Laqab): Sirāj al-Dīn
- Toponymic (Nisba): al-Bulqini, al-Shāfi'ī

Abū Hafs Sirāj al-Dīn al-Bulqīnī (Arabic: أبو حفص سراج الدين البلقيني; c. 1324–1403 CE); also known as just Sirajuddin al-Bulqini was an Egyptian scholar of Islamic Jurisprudence. Regarded as the foremost leading Shafi'i jurist of his time. He was known to have reached ijtihad in the science of jurisprudence.

He is a prominent scholar of the famous al-Bulqīnī family, which was an influential dynasty of Shāfiʿī judges, law professors, and administrators in Mamlūk Syria and Egypt. They were renowned for being the house of knowledge, virtue, leadership and generosity.

== Early life ==
He was born in the August 4th of 1324 CE. He memorized the Noble Qur'an when he was seven years old, which was a young age that only a few scholars ever did. He also memorized "Al-Muharir" in jurisprudence, "Al-Kafi" in grammar by Ibn Malik, and Mukhtasar Ibn Al-Hajib in Usul al-Fiqh and "Al-Shatibiyyah" in readings, and many other famous Islamic science books. His hometown is called Bulqini. It is said that the third grandfather of Siraj al-Din, was the first to reside in Bulqini, and that is why he was nicknamed Al-Bulqini which is a village belonging to the center of al-Mahalla al-Kubra, Gharbia Governorate on Tanta Road.

== Moving to Cairo ==
His father brought him to Cairo when he was twelve years old. So he sought knowledge and studied under the scholars of his time, he studied under Sheikh al-Makhzumi, Sheikh Shams al-Din, Sheikh Al-Isfahani, others and most prominently Sheikh al-Islam Taqi al-Din al-Subki. He was authorized to issue fatwas when he was fifteen years old.

He surpassed his peers and colleagues, and the conditions of jurisprudence met in the correct manner. It was said that he was a "renewer of the ninth century AH", and his elders and colleagues praised him as a young man, and the study of science ended with him in the countries of the earth. Scholars and students came to him from every direction, and fatwas came to him from every side.

He married a daughter of the grammarian and jurist Abd Allah ibn Abd al-Rahman ibn Aqil.

== Career ==
After his primary education in Egypt. He assumed several positions, including the fatwa of the House of Justice, and he travelled to Damascus and was appointed as a Mufti in the year 769 AH, where he worked for a short period, then returned.

He has also served as a lecturer at Al-Azhar Mosque. He had a vast number of disciples that the entire Egypt following the Shafi`i school had Ulama who were either his own disciples or disciples of his disciples.

== Students ==
His most popular students were:

- Alam al-Din al-Bulqini, his son who was the teacher of Al-Suyuti and Zakariyya al-Ansari
- Ibn Hajar Al-Asqalani
- Badr al-Din al-Ayni
- Jalal ad-Din al-Mahalli
- Ibn Nasir al-Dimishqi
- Al-Damiri
- Burhan al-Din al-Muhaddith

== Death ==
Imam Siraj al-Din al-Bulqini died on Friday, 1 June 1403 CE. His son, Jalal al-Din, prayed for him and was buried in his school after a long life that he spent in the service of Islam and its sciences. His student Ibn Hajar and others mourned him with long poems.

== Works ==
- Tashih al-Minhaj, an explanation of Al-Nawawi's Minhaj al-Talibin.
- Sharh al Tirmidhi, commentary on Sahih al-Tirmidhi
- Musabah al-Manahij
- Litashih al-Murajaea
- Bidayatan Bi-kitab al-Dhabihat Wantha'an Bi-kitab al-Shahadat
