= History of the Caliphs =

15-century Arabic book by Al-Suyuti

- Author: Jalal al-Din al-Suyuti
- Original title: تاريخ الخلفاء
- Language: Arabic
- Subject: Islamic history
- Genre: Non-fiction
- Media type: Print (Hardcover & Paperback)

History of the Caliphs (Arabic: تاريخ الخلفاء, romanized: Tārīkh al-Khulafāʾ) is a history book written by al-Suyuti (c. 1445-1505), the classic Sunni scholar. It provides biographies of the Caliphs starting from the Rashidun Caliphs and ending with the Abbasid Caliphs. It was translated and published in English in 1881 in Calcutta and republished in English at Oriental Press in 1970.

The book covers several periods:

- Rashidun Caliphate
- Umayyad Caliphate
- Abbasid Caliphate
- Fatimid Caliphate

== Chapters ==
The book contains several chapters before commencing with the mention of the Caliphs, which Jalal al-Din al-Suyuti summarized as follows:

1. Chapter on explaining that the Prophet did not appoint a successor and the reason for that.
2. Chapter on explaining that the Imams are from the Quraysh tribe and that the Caliphate belongs to them.
3. Chapter on the duration of the Caliphate in Islam.
4. Chapter on the hadiths warning about the Caliphate of the Banu Umayya.
5. Chapter on the hadiths heralding the Caliphate of the Banu Abbas.
6. Chapter on the matter of the Prophet's cloak (al-Burda al-Nabawiyya) which the Caliphs passed down until the end of time.
7. Chapter on scattered benefits that occur in biographies, but mentioning them in one place is more suitable and beneficial.

== Suyuti's references ==
As the author mentioned at the end of the book, he relied on the following references:

- Tarikh al-Dhahabi (History of al-Dhahabi)
- Anba' al-Ghumr li-Ibn Hajar (News of the Unseen by Ibn Hajar)
- Tarikh Baghdad lil-Khatib (The History of Baghdad by al-Khatib al-Baghdadi)
- Tarikh Dimashq li-Ibn 'Asakir (The History of Damascus by Ibn 'Asakir)
- Al-Awraq lil-Suli (The Papers by al-Suli)
- Al-Tuyuriyyat
- Al-Hilya li-Abi Nu'aym (The Adornment/Beautification by Abu Nu'aym al-Asbahani)
- Al-Mujalasa lil-Dinawari (The Sessions/Conferences by al-Dinawari)
- Al-Kamil lil-Mubarrad (The Complete [Work] by al-Mubarrad)
- Amali Tha'lab (The Dictations/Literary Gatherings of Tha'lab)

== Translation ==
The History of the Khalifahs who took the Right Way is a partial translation of History of the Caliphs. Its translator, Abdassamad Clarke, chose to translate the biographies of the first four "Rightly Guided Caliphs" adding to them Imam Hasan ibn Ali, because of his action in healing the divisions in the early community and, according to Sunni Muslims' opinion, legitimately handing power over to Mu'awiyah ibn Abi Sufyan.
