= Al-Suyuti =

Egyptian Islamic scholar (1445–1505)

- السيوطي
- Title: Shaykh al-Islām; Jalal al-Din; Al-Ḥāfiẓ

Personal life
- Born: 11 October 1445 CE / 1 Rajab 849 AH Cairo, Mamluk Sultanate
- Died: 18 October 1505 CE / 19 Jumadi Ula 911 AH Cairo, Mamluk Sultanate
- Region: Egypt
- Main interest(s): Aqidah, Sharia, Fiqh, Usul al-Fiqh, Hadith, Usul al-Hadith, Tafsir, Arabic grammar, Arabic Literature, Rhetoric, Philology, lexicography, Seerah, History, Mathematics, Medicine
- Notable work(s): Tafsir al-Jalalayn, Al-Dur al-Manthur, Al-Itqan, Al-Jami' al-Saghir, Tanbih al-Ghabi bi-Tabri'at Ibn 'Arabi

Religious life
- Religion: Islam
- Denomination: Sunni
- Jurisprudence: Shafi'i
- Tariqa: Shadhiliyya
- Creed: Ash'ari

Muslim leader
- Influenced by: Al-Shafi'i, Abu al-Hasan al-Ash'ari, Abu al-Hasan al-Shadhili, Ibn Arabi, Al-Nawawi, Ibn Kathir, Siraj al-Din al-Bulqini, Ibn al-Mulaqqin, Al-Zarkashi, Ibn Hajar al-Asqalani, Jalāl al-Dīn al Mahallī, Al-Kamal ibn al-Humam, Al-Sakhawi, Sharaf al-Din al-Munawi
- Influenced: Al-Sha'rani, Al-Dawudi, Al-Muttaqi al-Hindi, Shihab al-Din al-Ramli
- Arabic name
- Personal (Ism): 'Abd al-Raḥmān
- Patronymic (Nasab): ibn Abī Bakr ibn Muḥammad
- Teknonymic (Kunya): Abū al-Faḍl
- Epithet (Laqab): Jalāl al-Dīn
- Toponymic (Nisba): al-Suyūṭī, al-Khuḍayrī, al-Shāfi'ī

Jalal al-Din al-Suyuti (Arabic: جلال الدين السيوطي, romanized: Jalāl al-Dīn al-Suyūṭī; c. 1445–1505), (Note: (Arabic: جلال الدين عبد الرحمن بن أبي بكر بن محمد الخضيري السيوطي; Abū al-Faḍl 'Abd al-Raḥmān ibn Abī Bakr ibn Muḥammad Jalāl al-Dīn al-Khuḍayrī al-Suyūṭī (Brill 2nd)) or al-Suyuti, was an Egyptian Sunni Muslim polymath of Persian descent. Considered the mujtahid and mujaddid of the Islamic 10th century, he was a leading muhaddith (hadith master), mufassir (Qu'ran exegete), faqīh (jurist), usuli (legal theorist), sufi (mystic), theologian, grammarian, linguist, rhetorician, philologist, lexicographer and historian, who authored works in virtually every Islamic science. For this reason, he was honoured one of the most prestigious and rarest titles: Shaykh al-Islām.

He was described as one of the most prolific writers of the Middle Ages and is recognized today as one of the most prolific authors of all Islamic literature. Al-Suyuti wrote approximately one thousand works. His biographical dictionary Bughyat al-Wuʻāh fī Ṭabaqāt al-Lughawīyīn wa-al-Nuḥāh contains valuable accounts of prominent figures in the early development of Arabic philology. He was also in his time the leading authority of the Shafi'i school of thought (madhhab).

== Biography ==
=== Early life ===
Al-Suyuti was born to a family of Persian descent on 3 October AD1445 (1 Rajab 849 AH) in Cairo in the Mamluk Sultanate. According to al-Suyuti his ancestors came from al-Khudayriyya in Baghdad. His family moved to Asyut, hence the nisba "al-Suyuti". His father taught Shafi'i law at the Mosque and Khanqah of Shaykhu in Cairo, but died when al-Suyuti was 5 or 6 years old.

=== Education ===
Al-Suyuti grew up in an orphanage in Cairo. He became a Ḥāfiẓ of the Qu'ran at the age of eight years, followed by studying the Shafi'i and Hanafi jurisprudence (fiqh), traditions (hadith), exegesis (tafsir), theology, history, rhetoric, philosophy, philology, arithmetic, timekeeping (miqat) and medicine.

He then dedicated his entire life to mastering the Sacred Sciences under approximately 150 sheikhs. Among them were renowned scholars who were the leading scholars of each sacred Islamic science of their time.

- Shaykh al-Islam Al-Kamal ibn al-Humam, a leading Hanafi faqih and polymath of his era.
- Shaykh al-Islam Alam al-Din al-Bulqini, a leading Shafi'i faqih of his era and the son of the highly celebrated scholar, Siraj al-Din al-Bulqini.
- Shaykh al-Islam Sharaf al-Din al-Munawi, a renowned muhaddith (whose great-grandson 'Abd al-Ra'uf al-Munawi would write a famous commentary on Al-Suyuti's Al-Jami' as-Saghir entitled Fayd al-Qadir).
- Taqi al-Din al-Shamani, a hadith expert and a leading professor of the Arabic sciences.
- Jalal al-Din Al-Mahalli, a leading mufassir and a leading specialist in the principles of the law of his time who authored along with Al-Suyuti, one of the most famous tafsirs entitled Tafsir al-Jalalayn.
- Shams al-Din Al-Sakhawi, a leading muhaddith of his era and foremost student of Ibn Hajar Al-Asqalani
- Shihab al-Din As-Sharmisahi, a famous Hanafi scholar of his time.
- Sayf al-Din Qasim ibn Qatlubagha, a famous Hadith master of his time.
- Muhyi al-Din Al-Kafayji

In his thirst for quest for knowledge, Al-Suyuti travelled to Syria, Hejaz (Mecca & Medina), Yemen, Iraq, India, Tunisia, Morocco, and Mali as well as to educational hubs in Egypt such as Mahalla, Dumyat, and Fayyum.

=== Teaching ===
He started teaching Shafi'i jurisprudence at the age of 18, at the same mosque as his father did.

Al-Suyuti became the head master of Hadith at the Shaykhuniyya school in Cairo, at the suggestion of Imam Kamal al-Din ibn al-Humam. In 1486, Sultan Qaitbay appointed him shaykh at the Khanqah of Baybars II, a Sufi lodge, but was sacked due to protests from other scholars whom he had replaced. After this incident, he gave up teaching and was fed up with others being jealous of him.

=== Avoiding Public Life ===
In his late forties, al-Suyuti began avoiding the public after arguing with the Sufis at the Baybarsiyyah lodge. He disagreed with their claim to be Sufis, since they were not following the path of saints in terms of manners and ethics; he was thus dismissed.

Ibn Iyas, in his book called Tarikh Misr, said that when al-Suyuti became forty years of age, he left the company of men for the solitude of the garden of al-Miqyas, close to the River Nile, where he abandoned his friends and former co-workers as if he had never met them before. It was at this stage of his life that he authored most of his 600 books and treatises.

Rich and Influential Muslims and rulers would visit him with large sums of money and gifts, but he rejected their offers and also refused the king's orders to summon al-Suyuti. He once said to the king's ambassador:

"Do not ever come back to us with a gift, for in truth Allah has put an end to all such needs for us."

== Controversy ==
Al-Suyuti had some backlash with some of his contemporaries especially by his own teacher Al-Sakhawi and his fellow student Al-Qastallani who were two major renowned muhaddithuns. Al-Suyuti was accused for plagiarism which prolific writers were similarly accused of such as Ibn Al-Jawzi and Ibn Taymiyyah but those accusations were later dropped.

=== Defending Ibn Arabi ===
His most famous clash was with one of his teachers, Burhan al-Din al-Biqa'i, who staunchly criticized Ibn Arabi in his book called Tanbih al-Ghabi ila Takfir Ibn 'Arabi translated in English 'Warning to the Dolt That Ibn Arabi is an Apostate', Al-Suyuti responded with a book called Tanbih al-Ghabi fi Takhti'at Ibn 'Arabi translated in English 'Warning to the Dolt That Faults Ibn 'Arabi'. Both epistles have been made widely available. In his writing, Al-Suyuti presented that he considered Ibn 'Arabi a Wali (Friend of Allah) whose books are prohibited to those who read them without first learning the sophisticated terms used by the Sufis. He quotes from Ibn Hajar's list in his book called Anba' al-Gh which mention the trustworthy and respected scholars who kept a positive opinion of Ibn Arabi or even recognized him to be an Wali.

== Creed & Spiritual Lineage ==
He agreed with Al-Ghazali's conservative view of kalam, which states that the science should be studied by scholars who meet the necessary requirements to administer the appropriate dosages as bitter medicine to people who are in dire need.

Al-Suyuti was Ash'ari in his creed, as presented in many of his works. In Masalik al-Hunafa fi Walidayy al-Mustafa he said:

"The parents of the Prophet died before he attained Prophethood, and there is no punishment for them. The Qur'an says

'We never punish until We send a messenger [whom they reject]' (al-Isra' 17: 15).

Our Ash'arī Imams, among those in kalam, usul, and fiqh, agree on the statement that one who dies while da'wah has not reached him, dies saved. This has been explained by Imam Al-Shafi'i as follows: 'some of the fuqaha' explained that the reason for the above is, such a person follows fitra (primordial disposition), and has not stubbornly refused nor rejected any Messenger."

Al-Suyuti claimed to be a mujtahid (an authority on source interpretation who gives legal statements on jurisprudence, hadith studies, and Arabic language).

"I did not mean that I was similar to one of the Four Imams, but only that I was an affiliated mujtahid (mujtahid muntasib). For, when I reached the level of tarjih or distinguishing the best fatwa inside the school, I did not contravene Al-Nawawi's tarjih. And, when I reached the level of ijtihad mutlaq, I did not contravene Al-Shafi'i's school."

Al-Suyuti claimed he reached the same level as the major Imams of Hadith and Fiqh.

"When I went on hajj, I drank Zamzam Water water for several matters. Among them was that I reach the level of Sheikh Siraj al-Din al-Bulqini in fiqh, and in hadith, that of Hafiz Ibn Hajar Al-Asqalani.'"

Al-Suyuti also claimed there was no scholar on Earth more knowledgeable than him:

"There is no one in our time, on the face of the earth, from East to West, more knowledgeable than me in Hadith and the Arabic language, save Al-Khidr or the Pole of saints or some other wali - none of whom do I include into my statement - and Allah knows best."

This brought huge attention and heavy criticism by scholars of his contemporaries as he was portrayed by them as an arrogant scholar who viewed himself to be superior and wiser than others. However, Al-Suyuti defended himself stating he was only speaking the truth so that people can benefit from his vast knowledge and accept his rulings (fatwas).

Al-Suyuti was a Sufi of the Shadhili order. Al-Suyuti's chain in Tasawwuf goes way back to Sheikh Abdul Qadir Gilani. Al-Suyuti defended Sufis in his book entitled Tashyid al-Haqiqa al-Aliyya:

"I have looked at the matters which the Imams of Shariah have criticized in Sufis, and I did not see a single true Sufi holding such positions. Rather, they are held by the people of innovation and the extremists who have claimed for themselves the title of Sufi while in reality they are not.'"

In his book entitled Tashyid, Al-Suyuti demonstrates a narrative chains of transmission by providing evidence that Hasan al-Basri did in indeed receive narrations directly from Ali ibn Abi Talib. This goes against the mainstream view amongst scholars of Hadith, despite also being a respected opinion of Ahmad Bin Hanbal.

== Death ==
Considered the greatest scholar of his century, he continued publishing books of his scholarly writings until he died on 18 October 1505 at the age of sixty two.

== Reception ==
Ibn al-ʿImād writes: "Most of his works became world famous in his lifetime." Renowned as a prolific writer, his student Dawudi said, "I was with the Shaykh Suyuti once, and he wrote three volumes on that day. He could dictate annotations on ĥadīth, and answer my objections at the same time. In his time, he was the foremost scholar of the ḥadīth and associated sciences, of the narrators, including the uncommon ones, the ḥadīth matn (text), isnad (chain of narrators), and the derivation of ḥadīth rulings. He has himself told me that he had memorized over two hundred thousand (200,000) hadiths." Adding that there was no scholar at his time who memorized this much.

His admirers stated that Al-Suyuti writings reached as far as India during his time on Earth. His learning and more importantly his incredible prolific output were widely seen as miraculous signs from God due to his merit.

== Works ==
The Dalil Makhtutat al-Suyuti ("Directory of al-Suyuti's Manuscripts") states that al-Suyuti wrote works on over 700 subjects, while a 1995 survey put the figure between 500 and 981. However, these include short pamphlets, and legal opinions.

He wrote his first book, Sharh Al-Isti'aadha wal-Basmalah, in 866 AH, at the age of seventeen.

In Ḥusn al-Muḥaḍarah al-Suyuti lists 283 of his works on subjects from religion to medicine. As with Abu'l-Faraj ibn al-Jawzi in his medicinal works, he writes almost exclusively on prophetic medicine, rather than the Islamic-Greek synthesis of medicinal tradition found in the works of Al-Dhahabi. He focuses on diet and natural remedies for serious ailments such as rabies and smallpox, and for simple conditions such as headaches and nosebleeds, and mentions the cosmology behind the principles of medical ethics.

Al-Suyuti also wrote a number of Islamic sexual education manuscripts that represent major works in the genre, which began in the 10th-century in Baghdad. The most significant of these works is Al-Wishāḥ fī Fawāʾid al-Nikāḥ ("The Sash on the Merits of Wedlock"), but other examples of such manuscripts include Shaqāʾiq al-Utrunj fī Raqāʾiq al-Ghunj, Nawāḍir al-Ayk fī Maʻrifat al-Nayk and Nuzhat al-Mutaʾammil.

=== Major works ===
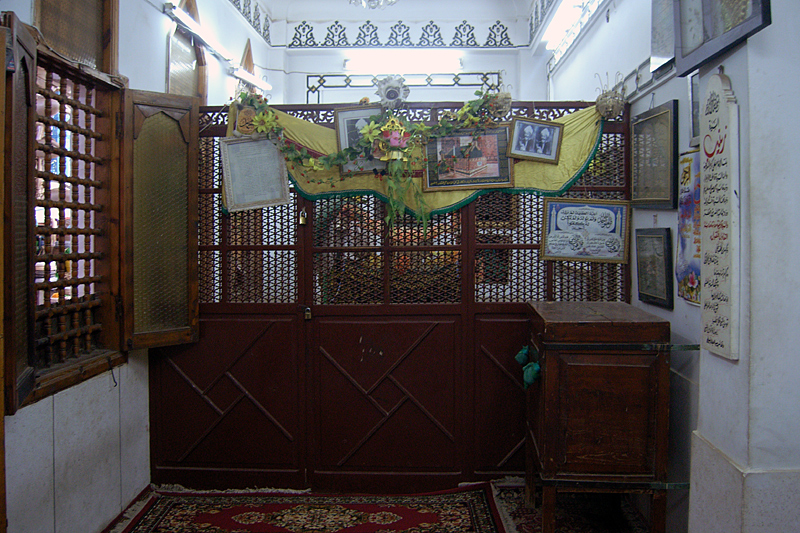
Shrine for Galal El-Dean al-Seyoti in Asiut

- Tafsir al-Jalalayn (Arabic: تفسير الجلالين, lit. 'Commentary of the two Jalals'); a Qur'anic exegesis written by Al-Suyuti and his teacher Jalal al-Din al-Mahalli
- Dur al-Manthur (Arabic: درالمنثور) a famous and authoritative narration based tafsir.
- Al-Itqan (translated into English as The Perfect Guide to the Sciences of the Qur'an, ISBN 978-1-85964-241-2)
- Al-Haba'ik fi Akhbar al-Mala'ik; an extensive work on angels in Islamic tradition.
- Al-Tibb al-Nabawi (Arabic: الطب النبوي, lit. 'Prophetic medicine')
- Al-Jaami' al-Kabir (Arabic: الجامع الكبير, lit. 'Large collection')
- Al-Jaami' al-Saghir (Arabic: الجامع الصغير, lit. 'Little collection' )
- Sharh Sunan al-Nasaai, a famous commentary of Sunan al-Nasa'i
- Annotations Sunan Abi Dawood, a complete annotations of Sunan Abu Dawood written by the Hadith scientist Al-Suyuti
- Alfiyyah al-Hadith
- Tadrib al-Rawi (Arabic: تدريب الراوي) both in hadith terminology
- Al-Ashbaahu Wan-Nadhaair, a famous authoritative book of the Shafi'i madhab
- History of the Caliphs (Tarikh al-Khulafa)
  - The Khalifas who Took the Right Way, a partial translation of the History of the Caliphs, covering the first four Rashidun caliphs and Hasan ibn Ali
- Tabaqat al-Huffaz, an appendix to al-Dhahabi's Tadhkirat al-Huffaz
- Nuzhat al-Julasāʼ fī Ashʻār al-Nisāʼ (Arabic: نزهة الجلساء في أشعار النساء), "An Anthology of Women's Verse'
- Al-Khasais-ul-Kubra, which discusses the miracles of Islamic prophet Muhammad
- Al-Muzhir (Arabic Linguistics)
- Uqud Al Juman (Arabic Rhetoric)
- Al-Faridah (Arabic Grammar)
- The Book of Exposition (credited)

== See also ==
- List of Ash'aris
- List of Sufis

== Sources ==
- Zulfiqar Ayub (2 May 2015). THE BIOGRAPHIES OF THE ELITE LIVES OF THE SCHOLARS, IMAMS & HADITH MASTERS Biographies of The Imams & Scholars. pp. 81–84.
- Mahdi Tourage, Ovamir Anjum, ed. (2017). American Journal of Islamic Social Sciences. Vol. 34. International Institute of Islamic Thought (IIIT). pp. 13–15.
