= Al-Dur al-Manthur =

Sunni commentary of the Qur'an by Al-Suyuti

- Author: Jalal al-Din al-Suyuti
- Original title: الدر المنثور في التفسير بالماثور
- Language: Arabic
- Subject: Quranic exegesis
- Genre: Islamic theology
- Publication date: 1505 AD
- Publication place: Egypt
- Media type: Print
- Pages: 6 volumes

Al-Durr Al-Manthur Fi Tafsir Bil-Ma'thur (Arabic: الدر المنثور في التفسير بالماثور, lit. 'The Scattered Pearls: Intertextual Exegesis') is a Sunni tafsir (exegesis or commentary of the Qur'an, the holy book of Islam) written by the prominent Imam Jalal al-Din al-Suyuti (d. 911 AH (1505 AD), who also co-wrote the Tafsir al-Jalalayn. The exegesis explains each passage of the Qur'an by the reports and narrations from the Islamic prophet Muhammad, his companions and the immediate generations following the Companions. Suyuti compiled all the reports and narrations that he could gather for each particular passage. The work was also mandatory for study in the Ottoman curriculum.

== See also ==
- List of Sunni books
