= Tadim =

- Civil parish
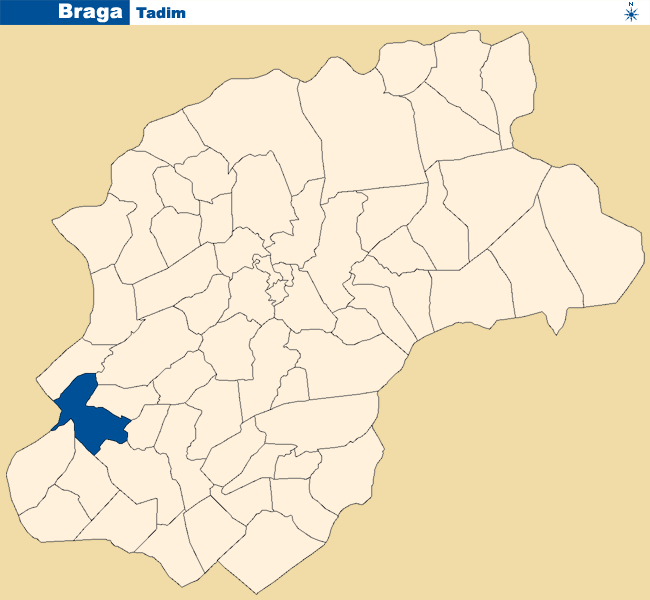
- Coordinates: 41.507°N 8.490°W
- Country: Portugal
- Region: Norte
- Intermunic. comm.: Cávado
- District: Braga
- Municipality: Braga

Area
  - Total: 2.68 km^{2} (1.03 sq mi)

Population (2011)
  - Total: 1,143
  - Density: 430/km^{2} (1,100/sq mi)
- Time zone: UTC+00:00 (WET)
  - Summer (DST): UTC+01:00 (WEST)

Tadim is a Portuguese parish, located in the municipality of Braga.

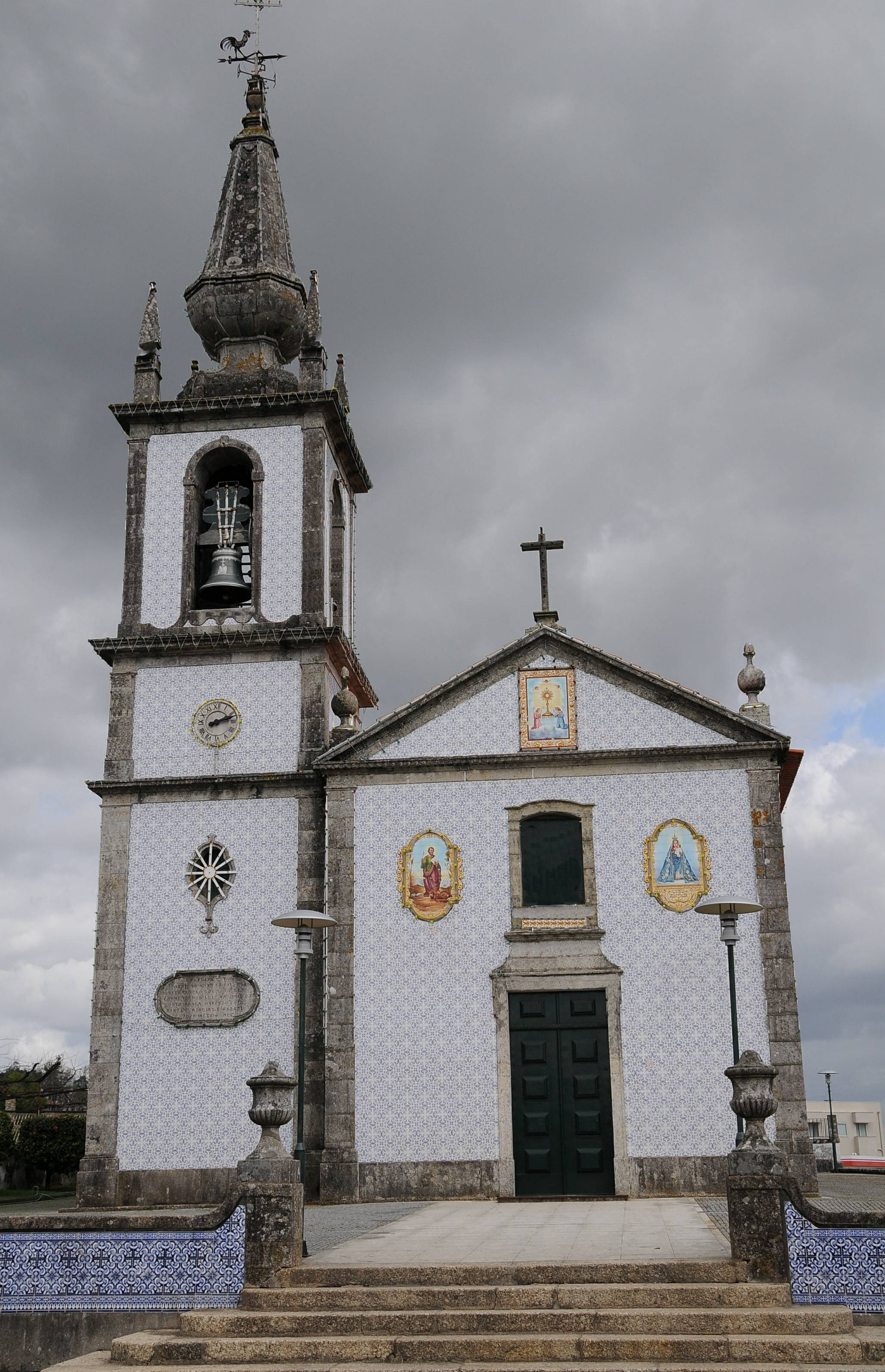
Tadim Church
