= Al-Mahalli =

Egyptian scholar and jurist (c. 1389–1460 CE)

Imam Al-Maḥallī
- المحلي
- Title: Jalāl al-Dīn

Personal life
- Born: September 1389 CE (Shawwal 791 AH) Cairo
- Died: 28 October 1459 CE (aged 70) (1 Muharram 864 AH) Cairo
- Era: Mamluk Sultanate
- Region: Egypt
- Main interest(s): Islamic jurisprudence, Principles of Islamic jurisprudence, Tafsir, Arabic grammar, Islamic theology, Logic
- Notable work(s): Tafsir al-Jalalayn; Kanz al-Raghibin
- Occupation: Scholar, Jurist, Legal theoretician, Quranic exegete, Grammarian, Theologian, Logician

Religious life
- Religion: Islam
- Denomination: Sunni
- Jurisprudence: Shafi'i
- Creed: Ash'ari

Muslim leader
- Influenced by: Al-Shafi'i Abu al-Hasan al-Ash'ari Al-Nawawi Taj al-Din al-Subki Wali al-Din al-'Iraqi Ibn Hajar al-Asqalani 'Ala' al-Din al-Bukhari
- Influenced: Zakariyya al-Ansari Al-Sakhawi Al-Suyuti
- Arabic name
- Personal (Ism): Muhammad
- Patronymic (Nasab): ibn Shihab al-Din
- Teknonymic (Kunya): Abu Abd Allah
- Epithet (Laqab): Jalāl al-Dīn
- Toponymic (Nisba): al-Mahalli, al-Shāfi‘ī

Abū ‘Abd Allāh Muḥammad ibn Shihāb ad-Dīn Jalāl ad-Dīn al-Maḥallī (Arabic: جلال الدين أبو عبد الله محمد بن شهاب الدين أحمد بن كمال الدين محمد بن إبراهيم بن أحمد بن هاشم العباسي الأنصاري المحلّي; commonly known as Al-Maḥallī (Arabic: المحلي; 1389–1459 CE) was an Egyptian Sunni scholar. He was a towering Shafi'i jurist, legal theoretician, Quranic commentator, grammarian, theologian, and logician. He authored numerous and lengthy works on various branches of Islamic Studies, among which the most important two are Tafsir al-Jalalayn and Kanz al-Raghibin, an explanation of al-Nawawi's Minhaj al-Talibin, a classical manual on Islamic Law according to Shafi'i fiqh.

== Life ==
He was born in Cairo in Shawwāl 791 AH (23 September 1389) and lived there. According to Ibn al-ʿImād, he was from the Arabs of Taftāzān. His family originally came from Maḥallat al-Kubrā, west of the Damietta branch of the Nile, and thus they became known by the nisbah “al-Maḥallī.”

Al-Maḥallī received his first education from his father and grandfather. In Cairo, where a great scholarly flourishing was taking place. He attended the lessons and scholarly circles of Shāfiʿī, Ḥanafī, and Mālikī scholars. He grew up there, recited the Qurʾān, wrote extensively, and occupied himself with various disciplines. He studied fiqh, usul al-fiqh, and Arabic under al-Shams al-Birmāwī, with whom he remained closely associated in al-Birsīmiyyah. He also studied fiqh under al-Bayjūrī, Jalāl al-Dīn al-Bulqīnī, and Ibn al-ʿIrāqī; uṣūl under al-ʿIzz ibn Jamāʿah; grammar under Shihāb al-ʿAjīmī, the grandson of Ibn Hishām al-Anṣārī, and al-Shams al-Shaṭnūfī; inheritance law and arithmetic under Nāṣir al-Dīn ibn Anas al-Miṣrī al-Ḥanafī; and logic, dialectics, rhetoric, eloquence, prosody, and likewise uṣūl al-fiqh under Badr al-Aqṣarāʾī. He likewise accompanied al-Bisāṭī in tafsir and usul al-din, among other subjects, and benefited greatly from him. He also studied with al-ʿAlāʾ al-Bukhārī and in the science of hadith, he studied under Ibn al-ʿIrāqī and Ibn Ḥajar al-ʿAsqalānī.

Due to his extraordinary intellect, al-Maḥallī famously said: “My understanding does not admit error.” He distinguished himself through exceptional intelligence and analytical ability, eventually reaching a level where he authored works in these sciences and became one of the leading scholars of his age. Al-Maḥallī earned his livelihood through the cloth trade, the profession of his father, but left his shop to an agent so that he could devote himself to teaching and writing.

From 844 AH (1440 CE) onward, he taught fiqh at the Barqūqiyyah Madrasa, and probably after 852 AH (1448 CE) he succeeded Ibn Ḥajar al-ʿAsqalānī in teaching at the Muʾayyadiyyah Madrasa. A scholar who kept away from the political authorities, he refused the offer of the chief judgeship made during the reign of al-Malik al-Ẓāhir Jaqmaq.

People would come to him from outside Cairo seeking authorization (ijāzah) to transmit his lessons and books, to ask for fatwas, and to visit him. Among his students were al-Jarrāʾī, Burhān al-Dīn Ibn Abī Sharīf, al-Qalaṣādī, Najm al-Dīn Ibn Qāḍī ʿAjlūn, Taqī al-Dīn Ibn Qāḍī ʿAjlūn, Zakariyyā al-Ansārī, Shams al-Dīn al-Sakhāwī, and Jalāl al-Dīn al-Suyūṭī.

Al-Maḥallī was a charitable scholar who emphasized commanding right and forbidding wrong, and who lived without ostentation. He died on 1 Muḥarram 864 AH (28 October 1459 CE) and was buried in his family cemetery outside Bāb al-Naṣr in Cairo.

== Reception ==
Shams al-Dīn al-Sakhāwī said:

“He was an imam, an erudite scholar, a meticulous verifier, deeply analytical, extraordinarily intelligent, and exceptionally sharp-minded to the extent that some respected authorities used to say: “His mind could pierce diamonds.” He himself used to say: “My understanding does not accept error.” He possessed a razor-sharp mind and immense strength in scholarly debate, such that the Imam of al-Kāmiliyyah told me that he saw al-Wanāʾī beside him in discussion like a child sitting before his teacher.

He was greatly revered by both the elite and the common people, awe-inspiring and dignified, with the marks of righteousness upon him. His fame spread far and wide. People from distant lands sought his fatwas, and many nobles rushed to visit him and seek blessings through him.

The reality of his rank was even greater than all this. I would not place him below the rank of sainthood. His biography could fill entire volumes.”

== Works ==
His works became highly popular because of their excellent organization and because they were concise, clear, understandable, and reliable. His list of works include:

1. Tafsīr al-Jalālayn – So named because it was completed by Jalāl al-Dīn al-Suyūṭī. It has been printed many times, the first edition appearing in Delhi in 1211 AH / 1796 CE.
2. Al-Badr al-Ṭāliʿ fī Ḥalli Jamʿ al-Jawāmiʿ – One of the finest commentaries on Tāj al-Dīn al-Subkī's work on uṣūl al-fiqh entitled Jam' al-Jawami'. It has been printed repeatedly together with the text and marginal glosses, and numerous scholars wrote glosses upon it.
3. Sharḥ al-Waraqāt fī ʿIlm Uṣūl al-Fiqh – A commentary on al-Waraqāt by Imām al-Ḥaramayn. It was published several times in Cairo and Riyadh. Scholars such as Ibn Qāsim al-ʿAbbādī and Aḥmad b. Muḥammad al-Bannā wrote glosses upon it. Al-Ḥaṭṭāb’s commentary on al-Waraqāt also effectively functions as a gloss on al-Maḥallī's work.
4. Kanz al-Rāghibīn fī Sharḥ Minhāj al-Ṭālibīn – One of the most popular commentaries on al-Nawawī's famous Shāfiʿī fiqh manual entitled Minhaj al-Talibin. Several scholars, including al-Qalyūbī, Shihāb al-Dīn Aḥmad ʿAmīrah al-Burullusī, al-Ṭablāwī, and Nūr al-Dīn al-Ḥalabī, composed glosses upon it.
5. Sharḥ al-Qawāʿid li-Ibn Hishām – An unfinished commentary on al-Iʿrāb ʿan Qawāʿid al-Iʿrāb by Ibn Hishām al-Naḥwī.
6. Al-Anwār al-Muḍiyya fī Madḥ Khayr al-Bariyya – A commentary on Muḥammad al-Būṣīrī's entitled Qaṣīdat al-Burda. Muḥammad b. Aḥmad al-Desūqī later wrote a gloss upon it titled Ḥāshiya ʿalā Sharḥ al-Burda.
7. Sharḥ al-Burda (Sharḥ Bānat Suʿād) – A commentary on the Qaṣīdat al-Burda of Kaʿb ibn Zuhayr.
8. Kanz al-Dhakhāʾir – A commentary on the Tāʾiyyah of Taqī al-Dīn al-Subkī. The work remained incomplete, and one manuscript copy is preserved in the Beyazıt State Library.

The following works, though not mentioned in the biographical sources, are attributed to al-Maḥallī in library catalogues:

- Al-Ṭibb al-Nabawī – an abridgment of the work of Ibn Qayyim al-Jawziyya.
- Sharḥ Lāmiyyat al-ʿAjam – a commentary on Lāmiyyat al-ʿAjam by al-Ṭughrāʾī.
- Ḥāshiya ʿalā Sharḥ al-Bayḍāwī – an unfinished gloss, a copy of which exists in the Beyazıt State Library.
- Risālah fī al-Qirāʾāt
- Mukhtaṣar al-Hudā al-Nabawiyyah – an abridgment of a work by Ibn Qayyim al-Jawziyya.

== See also ==
- List of Ash'aris
