= Niyazi Misri =

Sufi mystic and poet (1618–1694)

Niyâzî-i Mısrî (9 March 1618, Malatya – 16 March 1694, Limni) was a Sufi mystic and poet and patron saint of the Niyâziye or Mısriyye branch of the Khalwati order of dervishes, known variously as Niyâzî Mısrî, Mısrî Nıyâzî, Skheyh Mısrî, and as Mehmed ü’l- Mısrî.

He is the author of several mystical poems and is also known for his commentaries on earlier Turkish mystical verses, such as those of Yunus Emre whose works are still preserved in Turkey today.

== Biography ==
Niyâzî-i Mısrî's real name is Mehmed and he was born on March 9, 1618, in the town of Aspozi, now called Soğanlı, in Malatya. His father is Sogancizâde Ali Chelebi al-Nakshibandiyya, an as his name suggests, his father was a member of the Nakshibandi sect and therefore Niyazi Misri was born and raised in a Sufi environment. Niyâzî and Mısrî are their pseudonyms. His pseudonym Mısrî is because he received his education in Egypt. He was educated in various madrasahs and developed his knowledge of Sufism in different places. In 1655, he received the caliphate from the sheikh of Halveti, Sinan-ı Ümmî, and was graduated in guidance.

He died at dawn on a Wednesday in 1694 on the island of Lemnos, where he was exiled by the Ottoman sultan, and was buried in his tomb on the same island. He has more than ten volumes of works in Turkish and Arabic, both in verse and prose.

== Teaching ==
Niyazi Misri adopted the views of the famous Sufi Ibn Arabi who is the founder of the Sufi Wahdat ul-Wujud school (Unity of Being) but did not write a systematic work on this subject. However, he processed this view deeply in his prose and poems. According to him, everything in the universe is a reflection of God's attributes. Niyazi Misri attracted the reaction of both the ulema and some figures from the Sufi circles with some of his views. One of the views that received criticism is the view that prophethood continued after Muhammad. Misri considers Muhammad's two grandsons Hasan and Husayn as prophets.

== Poems ==
Niyazi Misri was also an important poet whose poems were composed and sung as hymns in Sufi circles. Like Yunus Emre, Niyazî Misrî was able to express subtle mystical insights using very simple language.

== Works ==
=== Turkish ===
- Divân
- Tuhfetü'l-uşşâk
- Süleymaniye Küt. Reşid Ef. 1218 numaradaki mecmua.
- Mecmua-i Kelimât-ı Kudsiyye
- Risâle fi’t-tasavvuf
- Risâle-i Devriyye
- Ta‘bîrâtü’l-vâkıât
- Risâle‐i Devriyye
- Risâle‐i Es’ile ve Ecvibe‐i Mutasavvufâne
- Risâle‐i Eşrâtü's‐Sâat
- Tabirnâme
- Risâle‐i Haseneyn
- Risâle‐i Hızriyye
- Risâle‐i Arşiyye
- Vahdetnâme
- Risâle‐i İade
- Risâle‐i Nokta
- Akîdetü’l‐Mısrî
- Risale fî Devrân‐ı Sofiye
- Etvâr‐ı Seb’a
- Şerh‐i Esmâ‐i Hüsnâ
- Şerh‐i Nutk‐ı Yûnus Emre

=== Arabic ===
- Mevâidü’l‐irfân
- Devre‐i Arşiyye
- Tesbî‐i Kasîde‐i Bür’e (Bürde)
- Tefsîr‐i Fâtihatü’l‐Kitâb
- Mecâlis

== See also ==
- Sufism
- Khalwati order
- Waḥdat ul-Wujūd
- Ibn Arabi
- Yunus Emre
- 73 Sects (Hadith)
