= Tafsir al-Jalalayn =

1505 Islamic interpretation of the Quran

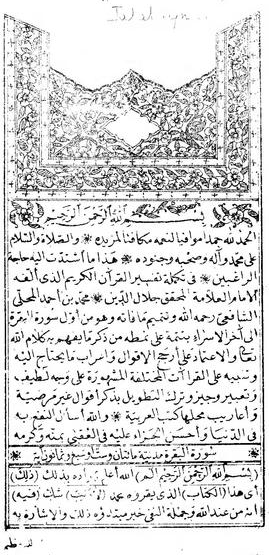
- The first page of "Tafsir al-Jalalayn" - Cairo edition
- Author: Jalāl Al-Dīn Al-Maḥalli; Jalāl Al-Dīn Al-Suyūṭī
- Original title: تفسير الجلالين
- Genre: Quranic exegesis

Tafsīr al-Jalālayn (Arabic: تفسير الجلالين, lit. 'Tafsir of the two Jalals') is a classical Sunni interpretation (tafsir) of the Quran, composed first by Jalal ad-Din al-Maḥalli in 1459 and then completed after his death by Jalal ad-Din as-Suyuti in 1505, thus its name, which means "Tafsir of the two Jalals". It is recognised as one of the most popular exegeses of the Quran today, due to its simple style and its concision—it is only one volume in length.

Tafsir al-Jalalayn has been translated into many languages, including English (two translations), French, Bengali, Urdu, Persian, Malay/Indonesian, Turkish, and Japanese.

== See also ==
- List of Tafsir works
- List of Sunni books
