= Siraj al-Din al-Makhzumi =

15th-century Sufi Muslim scholar

Shaykh al-Islam Siraj al-Din al-Makhzumi
- Title: Shaykh al-Islam

Personal life
- Born: 793 AH, (1391 CE) Wasit Governorate, Iraq
- Died: 885 AH, (1480 CE) Baghdad, Iraq
- Main interest: Akbarism

Religious life
- Religion: Islam
- School: Shafi'i
- Tariqa: Rifa'i
- Creed: Ash'ari

Muslim leader
- Influenced by: Ahmad al-Rifa'i, Siraj al-Din al-Bulqini
- Influenced: Siraj al-Din al-Bulqini

Siraj al-Din al-Makhzumi (Arabic: سراج الدين المخزومي; d. circa 1480) was a 15th-century Muslim scholar and a disciple of contemporary scholar Siraj al-Din al-Bulqini. He was a follower of the Rifa'i Order of Sufism and espoused the ideas of the famous Sufi philosopher, Ibn Arabi.

== Life ==
Siraj al-Din al-Makhzumi was born in the city of Wasit in 1391 but stayed in Damascus for a while before he travelled to Mamluk Egypt to study. In Egypt, he studied under Siraj al-Din al-Bulqini. However, al-Bulqini would later become a disciple of al-Makhzumi instead, after al-Makhzumi initiated him into the Rifa'i order. Later, al-Makhzumi went to perform the Hajj pilgrimage, He briefly visited Yemen after finishing his umrah, and then returned to Baghdad where he stayed for the rest of his life.

Siraj al-Din al-Makhzumi acquired a large following during his stay in Baghdad. He died there in 1480 and was buried in a mosque named after him. According to Abu al-Huda al-Sayyadi, the reason for al-Makhzumi's fame may be due to his mother being from a household of prominence in Iraq. Although it is also noted that al-Makhzumi was more popular than members of his family.

== Views ==
=== Takfir (excommunication) ===
Siraj al-Din al-Makhzumi followed the view of al-Shafi'i regarding takfir (excommunication). He agreed that the Khawarij are Muslims and are not excluded by takfir, nor are the Mu'tazilites or the Murji'ah. He also explained the terminology of "people of whims" as referring to the aforementioned groups.

=== Ibn Arabi ===
He was a staunch defender of the views and doctrine of the Andalusian philosopher and Sufi mystic, Ibn Arabi. Amongst his writings is the Kashf al-Ghita' an Asrar al-Kalam al-Shaykh Muhyi al-Din, a treatise which contains a defense of Ibn Arabi against accusations of pantheism and polytheism.

One of his students recorded the following statement from him:

We seek refuge in Allah from saying that he [Ibn 'Arabi] asserts indwelling or communion-with-the-divine! He is far above that. Rather, he is one of the greatest imams and among those who have probed the oceans of the sciences of the Book and the Sunnah.

== Writings ==
- Sahih al-Akhbar: A genealogical work on the lineage of those descended from Fatima daughter of Muhammad
- Kashf al-Ghita' an Asrar al-Kalam al-Shaykh Muhyi al-Din: A treatise defending Ibn Arabi from accusations of pantheism and other heresies.

== Legacy ==
Siraj al-Din al-Makhzumi was honourably given the title of Shaykh al-Islam of the Levant. A mosque known as the Siraj al-Din Mosque was built at the site of his tomb, with a modernist design by Iraqi architect, Rifat Chadirji. It allegedly contains some relics that belonged to the Islamic prophet Muhammad. The Ottoman-Syrian poet Abu al-Huda al-Sayyadi, who also held the title of Shaykh al-Islam, praised al-Makhzumi's generosity and character in his book Khazanat al-Amdad saying:

He was of good reputation, great stature, knowledge and action, great esteem, and great status. He was named and became famous, more than his brothers, as al-Makhzumi, because of his mother, Lady Sa'diyya bint Emir Abd al-Rahman al-Khalidi al-Makhzumi, and that was because of the high status of their house in Iraq and Persia.

— Abu al-Huda al-Sayyadi, Khazanat al-Amdad

== See also ==
- List of Sufis
- List of Ash'aris
