= Shahabuddin Ahmed (disambiguation) =

Shahabuddin Ahmed (1930–2022) was President of Bangladesh 1996–2001.

Shahabuddin Ahmed may also refer to:

- Shahabuddin Ahmed (ambassador) (born 1960), Bangladeshi civil servant and diplomat
- Shahabuddin Ahmed (artist) (born 1950), Bangladeshi painter
- Shahabuddin Ahmed (captain) (1948–2025), Bangladeshi independence activist and pilot

== See also ==
- Sahab Uddin Ahmed (born 1963), Indian politician
- Ahmed Shihab-Eldin (born 1984), American-Kuwaiti journalist
- Ahmed Shihabuddin of the Maldives, 14th-century Sultan
- Mohammad Shahabuddin (disambiguation)
- Shihab al-Din (disambiguation)
