= Shihab al-Din =

Shihab al-Din (Arabic: شهاب‌ الدین) may refer to:

- Adib Sabir (died 1143), royal poet of Persia
- Am'aq (died 1148), Persian poet
- Shahab al-Din Abu Hafs Umar Suhrawardi (1144–1234), Persian Sufi
- Shahab al-Din Yahya ibn Habash Suhrawardi (1155–1191), Persian philosopher
- Muhammad of Ghor (1162–1206), sultan of the Ghorid dynasty, Afghanistan
- Abu al-Abbas al-Mursi (1219–1286), Spanish Sufi saint
- Shihab al-Din al-Qarafi (1228–1285), Egyptian jurist
- Ahmed Shihabuddine of the Maldives (died 1347), Sultan of Maldives
- al-Nagawri, Persian physician
- Shihabuddin Bayazid Shah (1389–1414), Sultan of Bengal
- al-Qalqashandi (1355–1418), Egyptian writer and mathematician
- An-Nasir Ahmad, Sultan of Egypt (1316–1344), Mamluk Sultan of Egypt
- ibn Hajar al-`Asqalani, (1372–1448), Shafi‘i Sunni scholar
- Al-Mu'ayyad Shihab al-Din Ahmad (1430–1488), Mamluk sultan of Egypt
- Ahmad Zarruq (1442–1493), Shadhili Sufi Sheikh
- ibn al-Majdi (1359–1447), Egyptian mathematician and astronomer
- Shihab al-Din al-Ramli (died 1550), Egyptian Shafi'i scholar
- Shihab al-Din al-Khafaji (1569–1659), Egyptian Hanafi-Maturidi scholar and poet
- Shah Jahan (1592–1666), Mughal emperor
- Şihabetdin Märcani (1818–1889), Tatar theologian and historian
- Muhammad Shahabuddin (1895–1960), Chief Justice of Pakistan
- Shahab ud-Din Mar'ashi Najafi (1897–1990), Iranian-Iraqi Shia Cleric
- Khwaja Shahabuddin (1898–1977), Bengali politician
- Shabban Shahab-ud-Din (1909–1983), Indian field hockey player
- Syed Ahmad Shahabuddin (1925–2008), Malaysian politician
- Shahabuddin Ahmed (1930–2022), president and Chief Justice of Bangladesh
- Shihabuddin Nadvi (1931–2002), Indian writer
- Syed Shahabuddin (1935–2017), Indian politician and diplomat
- Shahabuddin Rathod (born 1937), Gujarati comedian
- Adnan Shihab-Eldin (born 1943), Kuwaiti, acting secretary-general of OPEC
- Makhdoom Shahabuddin (born 1947), Pakistani politician
- Shahabuddin Ahmed (artist) (born 1950), Bangladeshi painter
- Shahabuddin Ahmed (captain) (1948–2025), Bangladeshi freedom fighter and pilot
- Shahabedin Sadr (born 1962), Iranian politician
- Shehab El-Din Ahmed (born 1990), Egyptian footballer
- Shahabuddin Hekmatyar, Afghan detained by Pakistan authorities
- Shihab al-Dīn Aḥmad ibn ʿAbd al-Qādir ibn Sālim ibn ʿUthmān, Yemeni writer

== See also ==
- Mohammad Shahabuddin
- Shahab od Din, Afghanistan, village in Afghanistan
- Shahab ol Din (disambiguation), places in Iran
