= Shihab al-Din al-Ramli =

15th-century Islamic scholar

Shihab al-Din al-Ramli شهاب الدين الرملي
- Title: Shaykh al-Islām; Shihab al-Din; Al-Ḥāfiẓ

Personal life
- Born: Ramla, Mamluk Sultanate
- Died: Cairo, Ottoman Empire (957/1550)
- Region: Egypt
- Main interest(s): Fiqh, Hadith
- Education: Al-Azhar University
- Occupation: Muhaddith, Scholar, Muslim Jurist

Religious life
- Religion: Islam
- Denomination: Sunni
- Jurisprudence: Shafi'i
- Creed: Ash'ari

Muslim leader
- Influenced by: Al-Shafi'i Abu Hasan al-Ash'ari Zakariyya al-Ansari Al-Suyuti Al-Sakhawi
- Influenced: Ibn Hajar al-Haytami Al-Sha'rani Al-Khatib al-Shirbini Shams al-Din al-Ramli

Shihab al Din, Abu al-‘Abbas, Ahmad bin Ahmad bin Hamzah al Ramli, al-Munufi, al Misri, al-Ansari al Shafi’i (Arabic: شهاب الدين الرملي) also known as Shihab al-Din al-Ramli (d. 957 AH / 1550 CE) was an Egyptian Sunni Imam, Alim, Shaykh al-Islam, the scholar’s scholar of his time. He was one of the most prominent Shafi'i jurist and muhaddith in his age. In hadith, he was peerless and hadith disciples would gather in droves from East to West to seek his ijaza as he possessed the world's strongest chain. As a superior isnad, Shihab al-Din received hadiths from his renowned master, Zakariyya al-Ansari who in turn received directly through Ibn Hajar al-Asqalani. In fiqh, he was a mujtahid and along and with his student Ibn Hajar al-Haytami, represents the foremost authority for fatwa for the entire late Shafi'i school.

== Biography ==
=== Birth and education ===
He was born and raised in Ramla in a monotheistic household. From an early age he pursued religious and scholarly knowledge, and he has been described as an unusually diligent student. He advocated scrupulousness, humility, abstinence, and piety.

He studied hadith, fiqh, its legal theory, grammar, linguist, rhetoric, and literature. He also read Hadith. His status increased, as did his reputation. None of his contemporaries succeeded to the same degree as He did. He was so influential that His Sheikh, Shaykh al-Islam Zakariyya al-Ansari, allowed him to edit his writings both while he was alive and after his passing, Shaykh al-Islam used to say to him, “Correct what you see in my books that needs correcting and edit whatever needs to be edited and ascribe it to me.”

While Shiekh al Islam was alive, Al Shihab al-Din modified a number of verses from Sharh al Bahjah and Sharh al Rawd. He was given the go-ahead to issue fatwas and to teach by a group of his teachers. He studied general education courses, and his reputation spread quickly. His admiration made him well-known, and students came to him from all over.

=== Teachers ===
Al Imam al Shihab al Din had the fortune to learn from luminaries in a variety of fields of study.

Some of his teachers include;

- Shaykh al-Islam Zakariyya al-Ansari
- Shaykh al-Islam al-Suyuti
- Al-Hafidh Shams al Din al-Sakhawi
- Ibn ‘Awjan
- Burhan al Din Ibn Abi Shareef

=== Career ===
As the leading Shafi'i jurist of his day, he held the highest post of Nazir in 905/1499-1500 under the Mamluk sultan al-Ẓahir Ḳanṣuh where he served as the Grand Mufti of Egypt. He also taught in prestigious institutions most prominently the Al-Azhar University where he served as the Grand Imam.

=== Students ===
There are too many of al Shihab al Din's students to count. Students from the east and west came to learn with him. He served as the Shafi'i madhhab's Sheikh al Shuyukh during the time of its consolidation. He eventually rose to the position of leader of the Islamic sciences. Nearly every Shafi'i scholar (among the later Shafi'is) was either one of his students or a student of one of his students.

The most prominent of his students are;

- Ibn Hajar al-Haytami
- Al-Sha'rani
- Al-Khatib al-Shirbini
- Shihab al-Din al-Ghazzi
- Shams al-Din al-Ramli (his son)

=== Death ===
Shihab al Din lived an extended life. He continued to be very humble and abstinent from this world as he grew older. He spent his time learning by instructing, issuing formal legal judgements, writing, and commanding good and prohibiting evil. He continued in this state till the beginning of Jumada al Akhir (957 AH), when he died and entered the mercy of Al Rahman. People flocked from all over when word of His death spread, their eyes welling with tears and their hearts heavy with sorrow. The people prayed his burial prayer at Al-Azhar on the day of Jumu'ah. On that particular day, Al-Azhar was so full that many people were forced to attend funeral prayers somewhere else.

== Reception ==
Al-Sha'rani said: "More learned than all of his peers (era)."

Ibn Hajar Al-Haytami said: “the greatest of Sheikh al Islam’s companions, the Muhaqqiq of his era by the agreement of the people of his land.”

His son, Shams al-Din al-Ramli said, “The Sheikh, Imam and Magnanimous Scholar. The ‘Allamah, the extremely knowledgeable Sheikh of the Masha’ikh of Islam. Al ‘Alim al Rabbani and al ‘Amil al Samadini, the Sheikh of legal verdict and teaching, the center of Fiqh.”

== Works ==
With his extensive knowledge in the various fields of Islamic sciences, He did not leave lengthy works, rather all of his works are beneficial short works and the bulk of these works are in the science of Fiqh.

His works include commentaries of the following;

- Zahid’s Muqaddimah, commonly known as Sittin Masa’alah, by Imam Abul ‘Abbas Ahmad al Zahid.
- Asna al Mutalib sharh Rawd al Talib, by Shaykh al-Islam.
- Sharh Tahrir Tanqih al Lubab, by Sheikh al Islam.
- Al Ajurumiyyah
- Zubdat al Ulum
- Baydhawi’s versification regarding marriage
- Ghayat al Ma’mul sharh Waraqat al Usul by Imam al Haramayn.
- Ibn ‘Imad’s versification entitled “Fath al Jawad”.
- Fath al-Rahman, a comprehensive commentary on Safwat al-Zubad by Ibn Raslan,
- Tasliyah al Ka’ib bi faqd al Habib
- A work regarding the conditions of the follower and Imam and the Conditions of Ablution.
- Two Fatwa works, one gathered by His student, Imam Khatib al Shirbini and the other by his son, Shams al-Din al-Ramli.

== See also ==
- List of Ash'aris
