= Zakariyya al-Ansari =

15th-century Islamic scholar

Sheikh al-Islam Zakariyyā al-Ansārī
- زكريا الأنصاري
- Title: Shaykh al-Islam

Personal life
- Born: (823 AH/1420 AD) Sunayki, Mamluk Sultanate
- Died: (926 AH/1520 AD) Cairo, Ottoman Empire
- Region: Egypt
- Main interest(s): Aqidah, Kalam (Islamic theology), Fiqh, Usul al-Fiqh, Hadith, Usul al-Hadith, Tafsir, Qira'at, Arabic grammar, Linguistic, Rhetoric, Philology, History, Literature, Genealogy, Seerah, Tasawwuf, Logic, Mathematics, Scientific terminology, Medicine, Astronomy
- Notable work: Fath al-Ilah al-Majid bi-Idhah Sharh al-'Aqa'id
- Education: Al-Azhar University

Religious life
- Religion: Islam
- Denomination: Sunni
- School: Shafi'i
- Creed: Ash'ari

Muslim leader
- Influenced by: Al-Shafi'i Abu Hasan al-Ash'ari Ibn al-Majdi Ibn Hajar al-Asqalani Al-Kamal ibn al-Humam Jalal al-Din al-Mahalli
- Influenced: Shihab al-Din al-Ramli Ibn Hajar al-Haytami Al-Sha'rani Al-Khatib al-Shirbini Shams al-Din al-Ramli

Abū Yaḥyā b. Muḥammad b. Zakariyyā, Zayn al-Dīn al-Sunaykī (Arabic: زكريا الأنصاري) also known as Zakariyyā al-Ansārī was an Egyptian Sunni polymath. He is considered the leading specialist in fiqh, usul al-fiqh, hadith, usul al-hadith, tafsir, ulum al-Qur'an (Qur'anic sciences), Qu'ranic recitation, grammar, linguistic, rhetoric, philology, history, literature, genealogy, kalam (Islamic theology), logic and Sufism. He also excelled in other sciences such as medicine, engineering, astronomy, and mathematics.

He is described as the most renowned and revered scholar, judge and teacher of his time. He is highly regarded for his profound knowledge in all of the sciences and his books of various subjects became a reference for later scholars. He is deemed to be the mujaddid of the 9th century Hijri. He is regarded as the mujtahid and foremost authority in the Shafi'i school. According to the Shafi'i tradition, the most famous usage for "Shaykh al-Islām" is with Zakariyya al-Ansari.

== Biography ==
=== Birth ===
He was born in or around 1420 CE, in Sunayki, located in the Egyptian province of Sharqiyya.

=== Education ===
During his adolescence, al-Ansārī moved to Cairo to study at al-Azhar University. He lived in such poverty there that he would venture out into the night in search of water faucets and the rinds of watermelon. However, according to al-Ansārī's own account, after a few years at al-Azhar, a mill worker came to his aid. He provided the young al-Ansārī with money for his food, clothing, and books. al-Ansārī told of a remarkable encounter with his benefactor, who told him,

Zakariyyā, you will live to see all of your peers die, and your prestige will rise, and for many years you will occupy the highest post of Islam, and your students will become the shaykhs of Islam during your lifetime – when you go blind.

=== Teachers ===
Zakariya al-Ansari learned from many scholars from different backgrounds, and they are more than one hundred and fifty sheikhs, as mentioned in his book “Thabit Zakariya al-Ansari”. His most famous teachers were amongst the leading experts of various sacred sciences.

- Ibn al-Majdi: He studied mathematics and astronomy under him.
- Ibn Hajar al-Asqalani: Zakariyya al-Ansari was one of his close students. He exhaustively studied hadith under him.
- Al-Kamal ibn al-Humam: He studied multiple Islamic sciences under him.
- Jalal al-Din al-Mahalli: He studied tafsir and principles under him.
- Alam al-Din al-Bulqini: He studied jurisprudence and principles under him.
- Sharaf al-Din al-Munawi: He studied jurisprudence and hadith under him.
- Muhyi al-Din al-Kafiji: He studied the Arabic sciences under him.

== Career ==
=== Teaching position ===
Zakariyya al-Ansari held a number of teaching positions, where he taught in Cairo for eighty years, during which he moved between different schools over his long career, educating in the different Islamic sciences. He was appointed the most prestigious position such as teaching the shrine of Imam al-Shafi'i, and there was no higher position in Egypt than this job. He also served as the head master of Al-Azhar University.

=== Judiciary position ===
He served as the chief judge of Egypt, titled; Qadi al-Qudat literally "judge of judges" which was the highest post you could serve as a judge. He originally refused this post until Sultan Qaitbay insisted to accept his request, and the dignitaries of the state came to him seeking his approval. Zakariyya had no choice but to agree to this after all the urgency, so that Al-Ashraf Qaytbay said to him: “If you want, I will walk in front of you until I take you to your house.” He agreed and stipulated some things which were privately discussed, and both had to discuss their terms to come to the middle ground.

He proceeded with his work with complete integrity and apparent chastity, and he was not afraid encourage good and forbid evil, and he often burdened the advice of Sultan Qaitbay, He continued in this position for twenty years throughout the reign of Sultan Qaitbay, which is a remarkable phenomenon in his era, as it is considered a very long period for other judges. Najm al-Din al-Ghazi said: “He was the ruler of the regions and positions, and Sultan Qaytbay appointed him to judge the judges, and he did not accept him except after a complete review, then he was dismissed from the judiciary because of his insult to the sultan with injustice, and he rebuked him for it explicitly and exposure.”

In the year 906 AH, Zakariya al-Ansari was dismissed from the judiciary, and this was during the time of Sultan Al-Ashraf Qansuh al-Ghuri. This is because he used to rebuke al-Ghawri for injustice a lot, and the words were heavy on him, but it did not take long until he returned to the judiciary after the strong insistence of the princes, and he continued in it for five months, then he isolated himself when he felt that he was unable to carry out the burdens of the judiciary, due to his old age, His eyesight weakened, and his body atrophied, and this was in the same year (906 AH).

=== Students ===
Zakariya al-Ansari was renown in his era. Students came to him from all sides, studying under him, and benefiting from his knowledge. He reached a stage in his era and was distinguished for the shortest chain of the isnad, so a large number of people took from him. Many of his apprentices became world-class authorities in their own right;

- Shihab al-Din al-Ramli
- Ibn Hajar al-Haytami
- Al-Sha'rani
- Al-Khatib al-Shirbini
- Shams al-Din al-Ramli
- Nasir al-Din al-Tablawi

== Death ==
Zakariya al-Ansari died at the age of 100 years old, he spent all of those years in knowledge, teaching and the judging, and he died in Cairo at the year of 926/1520.

After the death of Zakaria al-Ansari, he was washed on Thursday morning, shrouded and carried in the morning, and he was prayed for at Al-Azhar Mosque in the presence of an countless number of judges, scholars, righteous people, saints, and the general public, and the King of Princes prayed for him then he carried his coffin and those with him from the princes, and the princes walked in front of him And judges, and scholars, and the elite, and the common people. His funeral was famous, and countless people witnessed it, and he was buried in the small cave near the grave of Imam Al-Shafi’i, who was affiliated with his school of thought, and was one of his imams and scholars. Al-Sha'rani said: “His funeral was well-known. Al-Alai said He was buried in the minor yard in the soil of Sheikh Najm al-Din al-Khuishati, near the tomb of Imam Al-Shafi’i, in a new watering can built by Judge Sharaf al-Din Qarib ibn Abi al-Mansur for himself, may God Almighty have mercy on him."

A funeral prayer was also offered in absentia after the Friday prayer at the Grand Mosque, and an obituary was mourned in Masjid al-Haram in Mecca, and his countless merits and virtues, and his famous qualities, were mentioned. He was also prayed in absentia at the Umayyad Mosque in Damascus, and people regretted his loss a lot.

== Reception ==
Al-Sha'rani says: “He became the most representative of the people of his time, and the chief of scholars among his peers, and he was blessed with life, knowledge and work, and he was given luck.”

Ibn Hajar al-Haytami said: "I introduced our sheikh Zakariyya; Because he is the most honoured of those upon whom my sight fell from among the working scholars and the inherited imams, and higher than those from whom I have narrated and studied among the wise jurists and engineers, for he is the pillar of the supreme scholars. Allah’s argument over mankind, the bearer of the Shafi’i school of thought on its shoulder, the liberator of its problems, and the revealer of its intricacies, in its first and foremost, attached The grandchildren of the ancestors, unique in the height of the isnad, how and there was no one in his era except those who took from him orally or through or through multiple means, but it happened to some of them that he took from him orally at times and from others. Between him and him there are about seven intermediaries at other times, and this has no equal in any of the people of His era, so yes, this distinction, which is more appropriate for the imams. Because he gained the capacity of his students and followers, and the large number of those who took from him, and the continuity of benefiting from him."

His contemporary, Jalal al-Din al-Suyuti, said: “Zakariyya, the sheikh of Islam, excelled and mastered, and took the path of Sufism. Tongue and silence."

Najm al-Din al-Ghazzi said : “The Imam, the Sheikh of the Sheikhs of Islam, the sign of the investigators, the understanding of the verifiers, the tongue of the theologians, the Imam of the jurists and the hadith scholars, the memorizer who is specific to the height of the chains of narrators, and the attachment of the descendants to the ancestors, the scholar, the worker, the complete guardian, the one who combines the law and the truth, and the traveller to God.” Come, I uphold the paths of the way, our Lord and Master, the Chief of Judges, one of the swords of truth.”

== Works ==
The topics of Zakaria al-Ansari's writings varied greatly, as he did not leave an art from the arts of Sharia, its instruments, and other various sciences that were taught in his era, such as medicine, engineering, astronomy, arithmetic, geometry and others, except that he classified them. In the classification, he followed the path of the scholars of his time, as it was most of them in that era to abbreviate the books of the predecessors in the form of texts to make it easier for students of knowledge to memorize them, or explain the abbreviated texts to clarify their meanings and remove ambiguity and ambiguity from their expression and manifestation, or put footnotes, which are notes and comments on explanations or fatwa books.

The Indian scholar and researcher, Abdul Qadir al-Aidarous said: “And he wrote in many sciences, such as jurisprudence, interpretation, hadith, grammar, language, morphology, meanings, statement, beautiful, logic, and medicine, and he has a long tradition in Sufism, and he wrote in duties, arithmetic, algebra, interview, form, geometry, etc. Other than that."

=== Major works ===
Qur'an and its Sciences:

- I‘rāb al-qur’ān al-‘aẓīm ("Syntax of the Great Qur'an")
- Ḥāshiyat fatḥ al-jalīl bi-bayān khafī anwār al-tanzīl ("The Clear Victory: A Gloss Elucidating the Ambiguities of 'The Lights of Revelation'"), a gloss of Tafsir al-Baydawi by al-Baydawi.
- al-Daqā’iq al-muḥkamah fī sharḥ al-muqaddimah ("The Accurate Minutiae: A Commentary on 'The Introduction'"), a commentary of Ibn al-Jazari's al-Muqaddimah on Qur'anic orthoepy.
- Fatḥ al-raḥmān bi-kashf ghumūd al-qur’ān ("The Opening from the Most Gracious: Unveiling the Ambiguities of the Qur’an")

Hadith and its Sciences:

- Minḥat (or Tuḥfat) al-bārī bi-sharḥ ṣaḥīḥ al-bukhārī ("The Gift of the Producer: A Commentary on 'The Sahih of Bukhari'"), a commentary of Sahih Bukhari by al-Bukhari.
- Fatḥ al-bāqī bi-sharḥ alfiyyat al-‘irāqī ("The Opening from the Everlasting: A Commentary on 'The Alfiyyah of 'Iraqi'"), an explanation of Zayn al-Din al-'Iraqi's thousand-line didactic poem on hadith sciences.
- Fatḥ al-‘allām bi-sharḥ al-i‘lām bi-aḥādīth al-aḥkām ("The Opening from the Most Knowing: A Commentary on 'The Notice on Legal Hadith'"), a commentary on Badr al-Dīn ibn Jamaʿah's collection of hadith containing legal rulings.

Creed, Theology and Logic:

- Fath al-Ilah al-Majid bi-Idhah Sharh al-'Aqa'id ("Opening the Majestic God by clarifying the explanation of beliefs"), a commentary of Sharh al-'Aqa'id al-Nasafiyya by Al-Taftazani.
- Afkar Rayeyt fi Sharh 'Anwar al-'Anwar ("Brilliant Ideas in Explanation of the Lights of Lights"), a commentary of Tawali' al-Anwar min Matali' al-Anzar by Al-Baydawi.
- Al-Matla' Sharh Isaghuji ("Insider Explanation of Isaghuji"), an explanation of the science of logic.

Jurisprudence:

- Asna Al-Matalib fi Sharh Rawdat al-Talib ("The requirement explanation of Rawdat al-Talib"), commentary of Rawdatu Talibin by Al-Nawawi.
- Manhaj at-Tullab fi Fiqh al-Imam ash-Shafi'i ("Manhaj al-Tullab in the jurisprudence of Imam al-Shafi’i"), a summary of Minhaj al-Talibin by Al-Nawawi.
- Tahrir Tanqih al-Labab ("Students’ Masterpiece"), an abbreviation of the book "Refining the pulp" by Wali al-Din al-'Iraqi.
- Al-Gharar Al-Bahia fi Sharh Al-Bahha Al-Wardiyyah ("Al-Gharar Al-Bahia in Explanation of the Rosary Delight System"), which is an explanation of the Rosary Delight system by Ibn al-Wardi.
- Nihayat al-Hudaa li Tahrir al-Aiktifa ("The end of guidance to the liberation of sufficiency"), a commentary of the science of imposition by Ibn al-Masri.
- Al-'Iilam Waliahtimam bi Jame al-Fatawaa ("Media and interest in collecting the rulings")

Principles of Islamic jurisprudence:

- Al-Hadaf min al-Wusul 'Iilaa Sharh lil 'Usul al-'Asasia ("The goal of reaching an explanation of the core assets"), an abbreviation of Jam' al-Jawami' fi 'Ilm Usul al-Fiqh by Taj al-Din al-Subki.
- Sharh Fath al-Rahman Qasu al-Ajlan" ("Fath Al-Rahman Explanation of Laqtat al-Ajlan"), a commentary of Laqtat al-Ajlan by Al-Zarkashi.

Arabic language and its Sciences

- Al-Wusul 'Ilaa al-Rabi bi Sharh al-Judhur a-Dhahabia ("Reaching the Lord with an Explanation of Golden roots"), a book on grammar and a commentary of The Roots Of Gold In Knowing The Words Of The Arabs by Ibn Hisham al-Ansari.
- Al-Durar al-Saniyyah fi Sharh al-Alfiyyah ("Al-Durar al-Saniyya explaining the millennium"), a footnote to Badr al-Din bin Malik's commentary of Alfiyyah Ibn Malik by Ibn Malik.
- Turuq Munasibat li Sharh al-Maailij ("Occasional ways to explain Al-Maailij"), a commentary of Al-Maailij by Ibn al-Hajib.

Sufism

- Ahkam al-Dalalah Tahrir al-Risala ("Tightness signifying the editing of the message"), an explanation of Al-Risala by Al-Qushayri.
- Al-Zabduh al-Ianiqah fi Sharh al-Burdah al-Faraiqah ("The elegant butter in the explanation of Al-Burdah Al-Faraiqah"), a commentary of Al-Burda by Al-Busiri.
- Al-Futuhat al-'Iilahiat fi Salih al-Nufus al-Bashariati ("Divine conquests in the benefit of human souls")

Other subjects

- Fath al-Mubdi ("Open the temples") on Algebra.
- Hudud 'Aniqat Wataerifat Daqiqatun ("Elegant borders and subtle definitions")
- Al-Lu'lu' Al-Nazim in learning education.

== See also ==
- List of Ash'aris
- List of Muslim theologians
- List of Sufis
