= Safwat al-Zubad =

Islamic Jurisprudential work

The Quintessence of Cream
- Editor: Ahmad al-Muhammad
- Author: Ibn Raslan
- Original title: صفوة الزبد
- Language: Arabic
- Subject: 'Aqida (Islamic Creed), Fiqh (Islamic Jurisprudence), and Sufism (Islamic asceticism/mysticism)
- Publisher: Dar al-Minhaj
- Publication date: 2020
- Publication place: Jeddah, Saudi Arabia
- Pages: 252
- ISBN: 978-9953-498-91-1
- Followed by: Sharh Sunan Abi Dawud

Safwat al-Zubad (Arabic: صفوة الزبد, lit. 'The Quintessence of Cream') is a didactic poem in Islamic jurisprudence authored by the 9th-century Sunni scholar Ahmad ibn Husayn ibn Raslan al-Ramli (d. 844 AH / 1440 CE). The poem consists of around 1000 rajaz verses and serves as a concise summary of the Shafi'i school, encapsulating its core principles and rulings. It was a standard textbook in renowned numerous Islamic institutions including the Al-Azhar University for centuries.

== Content ==
Safwat al-Zubad by Ibn Raslan is indeed considered one of the most important and highly regarded texts in the Shafi'i madhab. The work is structured to facilitate memorization, making it accessible to students and scholars alike. The work systematically presents the core rulings of Islamic law in line with the Shafi'i school, following the classical structure of legal manuals. Unlike many purely legal texts, Safwat al-Zubad also incorporates summaries on creed and sufism, giving students a more holistic understanding of Islamic knowledge beyond just legal rulings.

The text opens with a brief section on Islamic creed (ʿaqīdah), outlining essential beliefs such as the Oneness of God, prophethood, and the afterlife. This is followed by detailed discussions of ritual law (ʿibādāt), including purification (ṭahārah), prayer (ṣalāh), almsgiving (zakāh), fasting (ṣawm), and pilgrimage (ḥajj).

The poem then transitions to legal transactions and civil law (muʿāmalāt), addressing topics such as sales, leases (ijarah), loans (qard), endowments (waqf), and inheritance (faraid). It also includes rulings related to family law—such as marriage (nikah), divorce (talaq), and maintenance (nafaqah), well as penal law (hudud, qisas/diyyah, and ta'zir) and judicial procedures (qaḍāʾ), including evidence and testimony (bayyina and shahada). It also includes other things such as Islamic rules of war, the guidelines to slaughter animals (dhabihah) and hunt them, and the guidelines for Islamic funeral.

The work concludes with a section on spirituality (taṣawwuf), encouraging ethical conduct (adab) and the purification of the soul (tazkiyah), aligning legal practice with personal moral development.

== Commentaries ==
Over the centuries, numerous scholars have provided commentaries on Safwat al-Zubad to elucidate its content:

1. Fath al-Rahman by Shihab al-Din al-Ramli: A comprehensive explanation that remains one of the most widely studied commentaries.
2. Ghayat al-Bayan by Shams al-Din al-Ramli: A concise and accessible commentary, often used in conjunction with the original text.
3. Mawahib al-Samad by al-Fashni: A commentary that delves into the nuances of the text.
4. Ifadah al-Sadah al-Umad by al-Ahdal: Known for its clarity and brevity.

These commentaries have played a crucial role in preserving and transmitting the teachings of Safwat al-Zubad across generations.

== Reception ==
Shams al-Din al-Ramli said: "Indeed, Safwat al-Zubad in jurisprudence, authored by the Sheikh, Imam, scholar, and saint of God Almighty, Ahmad ibn Raslan, is one of the most ingenious books ever written in jurisprudence. It is the most comprehensive in its subject matter relative to its size, covering an array of topics in a manner that is remarkable for its brevity."

Al-Dawudi said: "It is of great benefit."

== Influence ==
Safwat al-Zubad is well-established in both Egypt and Levant where multiple editions are printed. It is widely taught and memorized in countries like Yemen and Somalia. Safwat al-Zubad has had a significant impact in Southeast Asia, particularly in countries like Malaysia and Indonesia. Scholars such as Shaykh Daud al-Fatani translated and commented on the work, further embedding it into the educational curricula of Islamic institutions especially in regions like Malaysia and Patani.

== See also ==
- List of Sunni books
