= Ibn Hajar =

Ibn Hajar may refer to:

- Ibn Hajar al-Asqalani (1372–1449), Shafi'i and Hadith scholar
- Ibn Hajar al-Haytami (1503–1566), Shafi'i scholar
