= Shahab ol Din =

Shahab ol Din or Shahab od Din or Shahab ed Din (Persian: شهاب الدين) may refer to:

- Shahab ol Din, Ardabil
- Shahab ol Din, Kurdistan
- Shahab ol Din, Mazandaran
