= Al-Kamal ibn al-Humam =

Egyptian Hanafi-Maturidi, polymath, legal theorist and jurist

Kamal al-Din ibn al-Humam كمال الدين بن الهمام
- Title: Kamal al-Din — Shaykh al-Islam

Personal life
- Born: 790 A.H. = 1388 A.D. Alexandria
- Died: 861 A.H. = 1457 A.D. Cairo
- Main interest(s): Aqidah, Kalam (Islamic theology), Tawhid, Fiqh (Islamic jurisprudence), Usul al-Fiqh, Usul al-Din, Hadith studies, Tafsir, Logic, Arabic grammar, Arabic literature, Rhetoric, Islamic inheritance jurisprudence, Sufism, Mathematics, Music
- Notable work(s): Al-Musayarah, Fath al-Qadeer

Religious life
- Religion: Islam
- Denomination: Sunni
- Jurisprudence: Hanafi
- Creed: Maturidi

Muslim leader
- Influenced by: Abu Hanifa Ibn Hajar al-Asqalani Badr al-Din al-Ayni 'Izz al-Din ibn Jama'a Wali al-Din al-'Iraqi
- Influenced: Al-Sakhawi Al-Suyuti Zakariyya al-Ansari Kamal al-Din ibn Abi Sharif Ibn Qutlubugha Ibn Amir al-Hajj Ibn al-Ghars Sharaf al-Din Yahya al-Munawi

Al-Kamal ibn al-Humam (Arabic: الكمال بن الهمام) was a prominent Egyptian Hanafi-Maturidi, polymath, legal theorist and jurist. He was a mujtahid and highly regarded in many sciences of knowledge and was also a Sufi. Highly regarded in all fields of knowledge, including fiqh, usul al-fiqh, kalam (Islamic theology), logic, Sufism, Arabic language and literature, tafsir (Qur'anic exegesis), Hadith, Islamic law of inheritance (in Arabic, known as 'ilm al-fara'id, or 'the science of [ancestral] shares'), mathematics, and music.

He is famous for his Fath al-Qadeer, a commentary on the famous Hanafi book al-Hidayah.

== Name ==
He is Kamal al-Din Muhammad ibn 'Abd al-Wahid ibn 'Abd al-Hamid ibn Mas'ud al-Siwasi, then al-Iskandari, known and often referred to as Ibn al-Humam.

== Life ==
He was born in Alexandria, Egypt, and studied in Cairo as well as Aleppo.He was born in Alexandria and grew up and died in Cairo. He was appointed head shaykh of the Khanaqah Shaykhuniyyah in Cairo in 1443.

== Teachers ==
He studied under many notable scholars, among them are:

- 'Izz al-Din ibn Jama'a (d. 819/1416).
- Wali al-Din al-'Iraqi (d. 826/1423).
- Ibn Hajar al-'Asqalani (d. 852/1449).
- Badr al-Din al-'Ayni (d. 855/1451).

== Students ==
Among his celebrated students are:

- Sharaf al-Din Yahya al-Munawi (d. 871/1467) (whose great-grandson 'Abd al-Ra'uf al-Munawi would write a commentary on al-Suyuti's Al-Jami' al-Saghir titled Fayd al-Qadir).
- Ibn Amir al-Hajj (d. 879/1474).
- Ibn Qutlubugha (d. 879/1474).
- Badr al-Din Abu al-Yusr Muhammad ibn al-Ghars (d. 894/1488).
- Shams al-Din al-Sakhawi (d. 902/1497).
- Kamal al-Din ibn Abi Sharif (d. 905-906/1499-1500).
- Jalal al-Din al-Suyuti (d. 911/1505).
- Zakariyya al-Ansari (d. 926/1520).

== Books ==
Among his well-known writings are:

- Fath al-Qadir lil-'Ajiz al-Faqir (Arabic: فتح القدير للعاجز الفقير), a commentary on al-Hidayah, a magnum opus in the Hanafi fiqh by Burhan al-Din al-Marghinani.
- Al-Musayara fi al-'Aqaid al-Munjiya fi al-Akhira (Arabic: المسايرة في العقائد المنجية في الآخرة), a Maturidi theological treatise that follows the sequence of Imam al-Ghazali's tract on dogmatic theology called al-Risala al-Qudsiyya (The Jerusalem Epistle); hence, the name al-Musāyarah (the Pursuit).
- Al-Taḥrīr fi Usul al-Fiqh (Arabic: التحرير في أصول الفقه), a work on usul al-fiqh synthesizing between the methodological approaches of the Hanafi and Shafi'i legal theorists.
- Zad al-Faqir (Arabic: زاد الفقير), a treatise on the rulings of prayer and purification.

== See also ==
- Badr al-Din al-'Ayni
- Akmal al-Din al-Babarti
- Khidr Bey
- List of Hanafis
- List of Ash'aris and Maturidis
- List of Muslim theologians
- List of Sufis
