= Ibn Raslan =

12th-century Islamic scholar

Imam Ibn Raslān
- ابن رسلان
- Title: Shihab al-Din; Al-Ḥāfiẓ

Personal life
- Born: 1371 Ramla
- Died: 1440 (aged 68–69) Jerusalem
- Era: Mamluk Period
- Region: Levant
- Main interest(s): Islamic jurisprudence, Hadith sciences, Sufism
- Notable work(s): Safwat al-Zubad; Sharḥ Sunan Abī Dāwūd
- Occupation: Jurist, Scholar, Hadith scholar

Religious life
- Religion: Islam
- Denomination: Sunni
- Jurisprudence: Shafi'i
- Creed: Ash'ari

Muslim leader
- Influenced by: Al-Shafi'i Abu al-Hasan al-Ash'ari Siraj al-Din al-Bulqini Ibn Hajar al-Asqalani

Shihāb ad-Dīn Abū ’l-ʿAbbās Aḥmad ibn Ḥusayn ibn Raslān al-Maqdisī al-S̲h̲āfiʿī al-Ṣūfī (Arabic: شهاب الدين أبو العباس أحمد بن حسين بن رسلان المقدسي الشافعي الصوفي), commonly known as Ibn Raslān (Arabic: ابن رسلان; 771-843 AH/ 1371-1440 CE) was a Palestinian Sunni scholar in the late medieval Islamic period. He was a prominent Shafi'i jurist and hadith expert best known for authoring influential works such as Safwat al-Zubad and his extensive 20-volume Sharḥ Sunan Abī Dāwūd. It appears he followed the Ash'ari theological school, and was a Sufi in his practice and behaviour.

== Life ==
He was born in Ramla and later moved to Jerusalem, where he died.

Al-Sakhawi said in his Al-Daw' al-Lami' (1/181): "He was not known to have deviated from the path of his parents and maternal uncle. He memorized the entire Quran by the age of ten... His father was a merchant with a shop, and he would order him to go there, but he would go to the Al-Khatuniyya Madrasa to study. His father would forbid him, but he paid no attention. He was diligent in his studies, initially focusing on grammar, language, linguistic studies, and poetry. He was appointed to teach at al-Khassakiyya and taught there for a time, then left."

His father was a good and pious merchant who read the Quran, and his mother was also among the righteous. She had a brother who was devoted to his religious practices and worship. It is said that Ibn Raslān neglected his father's business, which led to losses in the shop. His father reproached him, and he replied, "I am only suited for scholarly pursuits," so his father left him to his studies. He continued to study and review his lessons, residing sometimes in Jerusalem and sometimes in Ramla. He received his Sufi cloak from a group of Egyptians and Syrians and remained silent for a period. He memorized many books. Then, a scholar from the Maghreb came to Ramla and was teaching a single verse from Alfiyya of Ibn Malik for a quarter of a dirham. Sheikh Ibn Raslān stayed with him until he mastered it to the point of being qualified to teach it, and he became known for his excellent teaching. Then, he moved to Jerusalem.

== Poetry ==
Some of his verses on the places where it is not obligatory to return the greeting of as-salamu alaykum:

Returning the greeting is obligatory, except for one

Who is in prayer, or busy with eating. Or drinking, or reading, or making supplications, Or in dhikr, or during a sermon, or talbiyah. Or relieving oneself, Or during the iqamah or the adhan. Or if a child or a drunkard greets, Or a young woman if there is fear of temptation. Or a sinner, or a drowsy or sleeping person, Or during intercourse or a legal proceeding. Or if one is in the bathhouse or insane, These, after two, are twenty.

And he also wrote:

The cure for your heart's hardness is five things,
So adhere to them, and you will attain goodness and victory.
An empty stomach, and reflecting on the Quran,
And a weeping supplication in the hour of dawn.
Then tahajjud in the middle of the night,
And sitting with people of goodness and knowledge.

== Teachers ==
Ibn Raslān teachers include:

- Ibn Hajar al-Asqalani
- Al-Qalqashandi, known as Sheikh al-Allamah Shams al-Din Abu Abdullah Muhammad ibn al-Taqi Abu al-Fida Ismail ibn Ali ibn al-Hasan ibn Ali ibn Ismail ibn Ali ibn Salih ibn Sa'id al-Qalqashandi (746-809 AH). He studied Al-Hawi al-Saghir and other works under him.
- Abu Hurayra Ibn al-Dhahabi
- Abdullah Ibn al-Bastami
- Sheikh al-Allamah Abu al-Abbas Shihab al-Din Ahmad ibn Muhammad ibn Imad ibn Ali, known as Ibn al-Ha'im (756-815 AH), from whom he learned inheritance laws, arithmetic, and other subjects.
- The Imam al-Allamah, Sheikh al-Islam Siraj al-Din al-Bulqini (724-805 AH), in whose classes he was present and from whom he heard.
- The Imam al-Allamah, Qadi al-Quda (Chief Judge) Jalal al-Din al-Bulqini (763-824 AH), from whom he read most of Sahih al-Bukhari and who gave him permission to issue legal opinions.
- Sheikh Abdullah Nasim al-Din ibn Abi Sa'id ibn Muhammad ibn Mas'ud ibn Muhammad ibn Mas'ud ibn Muhammad ibn Ali ibn Ahmad ibn Umar ibn Ismail ibn Ali al-Daqqaq (735-801 AH), from whom he heard Ma'alim al-Tanzil by Al-Baghawi, having read it to his father, Abu Sa'id, who had received it from al-Sadr Abu al-Majami' al-Juwayni, who had received it from Imam al-Baghawi. He also read Al-Hawi al-Saghir, Al-Awarif by Suhrawardi, and Musnad al-Shafi'i to him. He also heard Al-Adhkar and Al-Arba'un al-Nawawiyya from him, which he narrated from Ali ibn Ahmad al-Nuwayri al-Uqayli, who had heard them from Yahya ibn Muhammad al-Tunisi al-Mughrawi, who had heard them from Imam al-Nawawi.
- The scholar al-Wali Shihab al-Din Abu al-Abbas Ahmad ibn Muhammad ibn Muhammad al-Shafi'i al-Sufi, known as Ibn al-Nasih (d. 804 AH), with whom he spent time and from whom he heard Hadith.
- Sheikh Jalal al-Din Abdullah ibn Khalil ibn Ali ibn Umar ibn Mas'ud al-Bastami al-Wali (d. 794 AH), from whom he learned the Sufi path and received dhikr from him.
- Sheikh al-Wali Shams al-Din Muhammad ibn Ahmad ibn Uthman ibn Umar al-Turkistani, known as al-Qrimi (720-788 AH), from whom he read Hadith and heard Sahih narrated from al-Hajjar in Damascus. He also learned Sufism from him and received the Sufi cloak from him.
- Sheikh al-Wali Muhammad al-Qadiri al-Salihi (d. 827 AH), from whom he learned Sufism and received dhikr from him.
- Abu Hafs Omar ibn Muhammad ibn Ali ibn Muhammad ibn Ahmad al-Salihi, known as Ibn al-Zaratiti, from whom he heard Muwatta Imam Malik narrated by Yahya ibn Abdullah ibn Bukayr in Ramla.
- The Imam al-Allamah Shams al-Din Muhammad ibn Muhammad ibn Muhammad ibn al-Khidr ibn Shumari al-Zubayri al-Ayzari al-Gazzi (724-808 AH), from whom he benefited in various fields of knowledge.
- Sheikh al-Muhaddith Shihab al-Din Abd al-Rahman ibn Muhammad ibn Ahmad ibn Uthman ibn Qaymaz al-Turkmani al-Asl al-Dimashqi, known as Abu Hurayra ibn al-Dhahabi (715-799 AH), from whom he heard much Hadith.
- Sheikh Ala' al-Din Abu al-Hasan Ali ibn Muhammad ibn Abi al-Majd al-Dimashqi (707-800 AH).
- Sheikh Burhan al-Din Ibrahim ibn Muhammad, known as Ibn Siddiq (d. 806 AH), from whom he heard Hadith.
- Sheikh al-Imam Abu al-Khair Ahmad ibn Khalil ibn Kaykaldi al-Ala'i (d. 802 AH), from whom he heard Sahih al-Bukhari, Jami' al-Tirmidhi, and Musnad al-Shafi'i.
- Sheikh Jamal al-Din Muhammad ibn Abdullah ibn Zuhayra al-Makhzumi al-Makki al-Shafi'i (750-817 AH).
- Sheikh al-Muhaddith Abu al-Abbas Ahmad ibn Ali ibn Sanjar al-Mardini, from whom he heard Al-Shifa, Jami' al-Tirmidhi, Sunan Ibn Majah, Sirat Ibn Hisham, Sirat Ibn Sayyid al-Nas, and most of the works of al-Yafi'i, narrated by him.
- Sheikh Siraj al-Din Abu al-Tayyib Muhammad ibn Muhammad ibn Abd al-Latif ibn Ahmad ibn Mahmud ibn Abi al-Fath al-Raba'i, known as Ibn al-Kuwayk (d. 807 AH).
- Sheikh al-Qadi Shihab al-Din Ahmad ibn Imad al-Din Ismail ibn Khalifa al-Hasbani (749-815 AH), from whom he heard Sahih al-Bukhari.
- Sheikh Shams al-Din Muhammad ibn Muhammad ibn Ali ibn Abd al-Razzaq al-Ghumari (d. 802 AH), from whom he learned Arabic grammar.
- Sheikh al-Muhaddith Afif al-Din Abu Muhammad Abdullah ibn Muhammad ibn Muhammad ibn Sulayman ibn Musa al-Nashawri, born in 705 AH, who gave him permission to narrate Hadith.
- Qadi al-Quda Ahmad ibn Nasir ibn Khalifa ibn Faraj ibn Abd Allah ibn Yahya ibn Abd al-Rahman al-Maqdisi al-Nasiri al-Ba'uni (751-816 AH), who gave him permission to issue fatwas.
- Sheikh Shihab al-Din Ahmad ibn al-Izz al-Hanbali.

== Notable students ==
His famous students:

- Ibn Abi Adheebah
- Kamal al-Din ibn Abi Sharif
- Abu al-Asbat al-Amiri

== Death ==
Ibn Raslān moved from his residence at the Al-Khatuniyya Madrasa in Al-Aqsa Mosque in Jerusalem and was buried in the Mamilla Cemetery near the shrine of Abu Abdullah al-Qurashi. Jerusalem. Funeral prayers in absentia were held for him at Al-Azhar Mosque and elsewhere. Ibn Qadi Shahba]said: "We offered the funeral prayer in absentia for him at the Umayyad Mosque on Friday, the fourth of Ramadan, which supports the view that he died in Sha'ban."

== Reception ==
Al-Sakhawi said:

And he is in asceticism, piety, austerity, following the Sunnah, and the validity of the creed is a word of consensus so that I do not know at his time who would compare him in that, and his mention spread and witnessed his goodness by everyone who saw him... His virtues are many and his ranks are famous. After al-Husni, (there) was not (a person) more ascetic than him.

== Works ==
Ibn Raslān was a prolific writer and his list of works include:

- Safwat al-Zubad, a poetic summary of Matn al-Zubad in Shafi'i jurisprudence. It is one of the most important poetic texts in Shafi'i jurisprudence, and he wrote a commentary on it. Its introduction is a poetic summary of the principles of Islamic faith from the book Jam' al-Jawami', and its conclusion is a poetic summary of Sufism from the same source. This poetic work was a standard text in the curriculum of Al-Azhar University and other institutions for a long time. It was printed in Bulaq in 1285 AH, with several commentaries on it.
- Sharḥ Sunan Abī Dāwūd is an extensive 20 volume commentary on Sunan Abi Dawud and it's considered one of the best commentaries of this Hadith collection.
- Luma' al-Lawami' fi Tawdih Jam' al-Jawami ("The Glimmers of Lights in Clarifying the Collection of Major Works"), a commentary on Jam' al-Jawami' by Ibn al-Subki.
- Explanation of Al-Nawawi's Forty Hadith.
- He has a commentary on Sahih al-Bukhari, in which he reached the end of the chapter on Hajj in three volumes but did not complete it.
- Explanation of the biographies of Ibn Abi Jamra in a volume.
- He explained Al-Shifa by Qadi Iyad, taking care to control his words.
- Explanation of Alfiyya of al-Iraqi by Zain al-Din al-Iraqi
- Revising the supplications.
- Explanation of the revision by al-Zarkashi.
- Problems regarding al-Kirmani's. He wrote a volume of it but did not complete it.
- Explanation of Minhaj al-Baydawi by al-Baydawi in two volumes.
- Explanation of Minhaj al-Talibin by al-Nawawi.
- Explanation of Al-Mukhtasar fi Usul al-Fiqh by Ibn al-Hajib.
- A summary of Adab al-Qada by al-Gazzi.
- A commentary on Mulhat al-Hariri, combining commentary with the original text.
- grammatical analysis of Alfiyya of Ibn Malik, in the field of Arabic grammar.
- A valuable collection of benefits related to legal judgment and witnesses.
- Abridged version of Hayat al-Hayawan al-Kubra by al-Damiri, with additions on a section about plants.
- Tabaqat al-Shafi'iyya - a book of biographies on the classes of Shafi'i jurists.
- A poetic arrangement of his chain of narration for Sahih al-Bukhari, along with a hadith from his Thulathiyyat, limited in his teachers to Ibn al-Ala'i.

Regarding his works, he said: "All of them need revision, and I seek Allah's forgiveness."

== See also ==
- List of Ash'aris

== Bibliography ==
- Montaser Abdul Rahman Saleh, Dr. Ahmed Khalaf Abbas Shimran (2023). "Rule: (Actions are by intentions) Rule: (Actions are by intentions) And its applications according to Ibn Raslan Al-Shafi'i (844 AH) in his book "Explanation of Sunan Abi Dawud"". Journal of Survey in Fisheries Sciences. 10 (3). College of Islamic Sciences, Fallujah University: 6144–6164.
