= Baha'i Mehmed Efendi =

Ottoman jurist, theologian, poet and scholar (1595–1601)

Personal life
- Born: Mehmed Efendi; 1595-6 / 1601 Istanbul, Ottoman Empire
- Died: January 3, 1654 Istanbul, Ottoman Empire
- Resting place: Fatih Mosque, Istanbul
- Notable work(s): Divan (6 qasida, 2 masnavi, 4 stanza, 2 history stanza, 40 ghazal, 8 ruba'i)
- Known for: Shaykh al-Islam, Fatwas in Verse
- Occupation: Jurist, Theologian, Poet, Scholar

Religious life
- Religion: Islam

Shaykh al-Islam Baha'i Mehmed Efendi (Ottoman Turkish: شیخ‌الاسلام بهايي محمد افندي) (1595-6/1601, Istanbul – 3 January 1654) was an Ottoman jurist, theologian, poet and scholar.

== Biography ==
He was first appointed as Shaykh al-Islam in 1649. Some of his fatwas are written in verse of which 4 of them are available now.

His best known ruling was his lawful pronouncing of smoking and ending the prohibitions and repressions of the early 17th century.

His body is buried in Fatih mosque.

== Divan ==
The Divan of Baha'i consists of 6 qasida, 2 masnavi, 4 stanza, 2 history stanza, 40 ghazal and 8 ruba'i.
