= Shaykh al-Islām =

Arabic honorific for an outstanding Islamic scholar

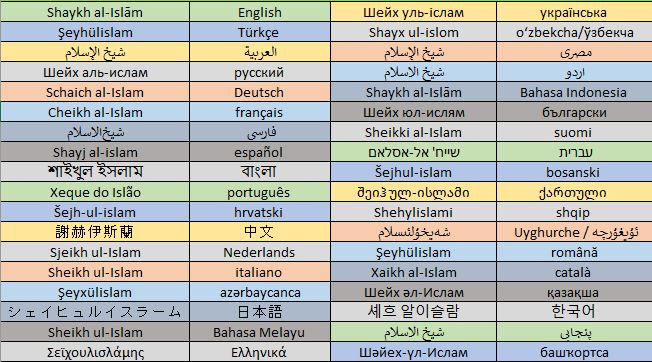
Shaykh al-Islām in different languages

Shaykh al-Islam (Arabic: شيخ الإسلام, romanized: Shaykh al-ʾIslām, lit. 'Elder (sheikh) of Islam') was used in the classical era as an honorific title for outstanding scholars of the Islamic sciences. It first emerged in Khurasan towards the end of the 4th Islamic century. In the central and western lands of Islam, it was an informal title given to jurists whose fatwas were particularly influential, while in the east it came to be conferred by rulers to ulama who played various official roles but were not generally muftis. Sometimes, as in the case of Abu Isma'il al-Harawi and Ibn Taymiyya, the use of the title was subject to controversy. In the Ottoman Empire, starting from the early modern era, the title came to designate the chief mufti, who oversaw a hierarchy of state-appointed ulama. The Ottoman Sheikh al-Islam (Note: Ottoman Turkish: شیخ‌ الاسلام, Turkish: Şeyhülislâm, French: cheikh-ul-islam; In languages of ethnic minorities: Bulgarian: Шейх юл-ислям (Šeyx-ul-Islyam); Greek: Σεϊχ‐ουλισλάμ (Seïchoul-Islam); Armenian: Շեյխ ալ-Իսլամ Šeyx-iwl-islami; Ladino: şeh ul islam) performed a number of functions, including advising the sultan on religious matters, legitimizing government policies, and appointing judges.

With the abolition of the Caliphate in 1924, the official Ottoman office of Shaykh al-Islām, already in decline, was eliminated. Modern times have seen the role of chief mufti carried out by grand muftis appointed or elected in a variety of ways.

== Classical usage ==
Like other honorific titles starting with the word sheikh, the term shaykh al-islam was in the classical era reserved for ulama and mystics. It first appeared in Khurasan in the 4th century AH (10th century AD). In major cities of Khurasan it seems to have had more specific connotations, since only one person held the title at any given time and place. An urban Shaykh al-Islam was the senior scholar who headed a city's religious and educational establishment, supervising lecturers and arbitrating legal disputes. Rural Shaykhs al-Islam acted as lords, owning land, handling administration, and wielding some legal authority as magistrates. Holders of the title in Khurasan were among the most influential ulama, but there is no evidence that they delivered fatwas.

Under the Ilkhans, the Delhi Sultanate, and the Timurids, the title was conferred, often by the ruler, to high-ranking ulama who performed various functions but were not generally muftis.

In the Kashmiri Sultanate, it was implemented during the reign of Sultan Sikandar. He established the office of the Shaikhu'l-Islam under the influence of Sayyid Muhammad Hamadan, who had come to Kashmir in 1393 AD.

In Syria and Egypt, it was given to influential jurists and had an honorific rather than an official role. By 700 AH/1300 AD in the central and western lands of Islam, the term became associated with the giving of fatwas.

Ibn Taymiyya was given the title by his supporters but his adversaries contested this use. For example, the Hanafi scholar 'Ala' al-Din al-Bukhari issued a fatwa stating that anyone who called Ibn Taymiyya "Shaykh al-islam" had committed disbelief (kufr). However, Shafiite scholar Ibn Hajar al-Asqalani defended the title of Shaykh al Islam for Ibn Taymiyyah, saying in his own words, "His status as imam, sheikh, Taqiyuddin Ibn Taimiyah, is brighter than the sun. And his title with Shaykhul Islam, we still often hear from holy orals until now, and will continue to survive tomorrow.", which was recorded by his student al Sakhawi. The Hanbalite madhhab scholar and follower of Ibn Taymiyyah, Ibn Qayyim al-Jawziyya (himself also given Shaykh al Islam title by his contemporary) defended the usage of the title for him. Ibn Taymiyya and Ibn Qayyim are both known for contradicting the views of the majority of scholars of all four schools of thought (Hanafi, Shafi'i, Maliki, and Hanbali) of their time in Damascus and of later periods.

There is disagreement on whether the title was honorific or represented a local mufti in Seljuq and early Ottoman Anatolia.

== In the Ottoman Empire ==
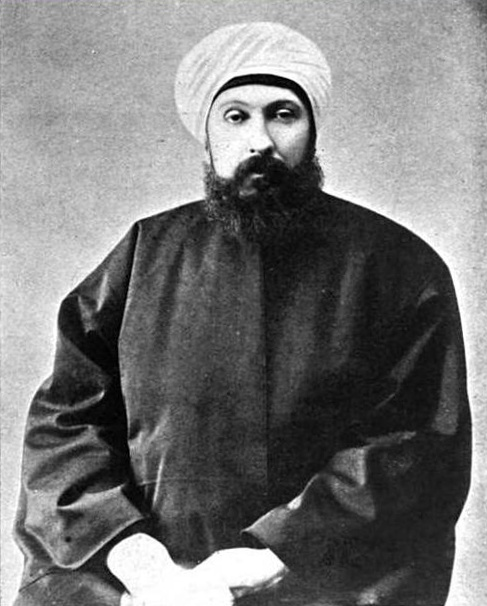
Sheikh ul-Islam Mehmet Cemaleddin Efendi during the reign of Ottoman Sultan and Caliph Abdul Hamid II

In the Ottoman Empire, which controlled much of the Sunni Islamic world from the 14th to the 20th centuries, the Grand Mufti was given the title Sheikh ul-islam (Ottoman Turkish: Şeyḫülislām). The Ottomans had a strict hierarchy of ulama, with the Sheikh ul-Islam holding the highest rank. A Sheikh ul-Islam was chosen by a royal warrant amongst the qadis of important cities. The Sheikh ul-Islam had the power to confirm new sultans. However, once the sultan was affirmed, the sultan retained a higher authority than the Sheikh ul-Islam. The Sheikh ul-Islam issued fatwas, which were written interpretations of the Quran that had authority over the community. The Sheikh ul-Islam represented the Sacred Law of Shariah and in the 16th century its importance rose which led to increased power.

The office of Sheikh ul-Islam was abolished in 1924, at the same time as the Ottoman Caliphate. After the National Assembly of Turkey was established in 1920, the office of Sheikh ul-Islam was placed in the Shar’iyya wa Awqaf Ministry. In 1924, the office of Sheikh ul-Islam was abolished along with the Caliphate. The office was replaced by the Presidency of Religious Affairs. As the successor entity to the office of the Sheikh ul-Islam, the Presidency of Religious Affairs is the most authoritative in Turkey about Sunni Islam.

== Honorific recipients ==
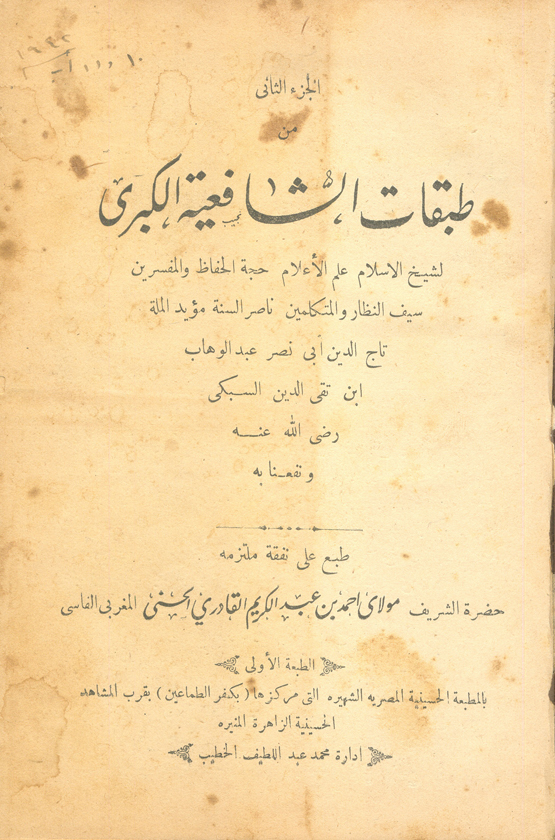
Book cover image, printed in 1906 in Cairo, written on it: Volume II of Tabaqat al-Shafi'iyya al-Kubra by Shaykh al-Islam Taj al-Din al-Subki

The following Islamic scholars have been given the honorific title "Shaykh al-Islam":

- Abu Mansur al-Maturidi (b. 231 AH)
- Al-Daraqutni (b. 306 AH)
- Abu Uthman al-Sabuni (b. 373 AH)
- Al-Bayhaqi (b. 384 AH)
- Abu Ishaq al-Shirazi (b. 393 AH)
- Abu Talib al-Makki (b. 386 AH)
- Najm al-Din 'Umar al-Nasafi (b. 461 AH)
- Khwaja Abdullah Ansari (b. 481 AH)
- Al-Juwayni (b. 419 AH)
- Fakhr al-Din al-Razi (b. 544 AH)
- Ibn al-Jawzi (b. 509 or 510 AH)
- Burhan al-Din al-Marghinani (b. 530 AH)
- Al-'Izz ibn 'Abd al-Salam (b. 577 AH)
- Al-Mundhiri (b. 581 AH)
- Ibn Daqiq al-'Id (b. 625 AH)
- Al-Nawawi (b. 631 AH)
- Ibn Taymiyyah (b. 661 AH)
- Taqi al-Din al-Subki (b. 683 AH)
- Ibn al-Mulaqqin (b. 723 AH)
- Siraj al-Din al-Bulqini (b. 724 AH)
- Zain al-Din al-'Iraqi (b. 725 AH)
- Taj al-Din al-Subki (b. 727 AH)
- Ibn Hajar al-Asqalani (b. 773 AH)
- Al-Kamal ibn al-Humam (b. 790 AH)
- Sharaf al-Din al-Munawi (b. 798 AH)
- Kamal al-Din ibn Abi Sharif (b. 822 AH)
- Zakariyya al-Ansari (b. 823 AH)
- Al-Suyuti (b. 849 AH)
- Ibn Kemal (b. 873 AH)
- Shihab al-Din al-Ramli
- Ebussuud Efendi (b. 896 AH)
- Ibn Hajar al-Haytami (b. 909 AH)
- Shams al-Din al-Ramli (b. 919 AH)
- Ahmad Zayni Dahlan (b. 1231 or 1232 AH)
- Abdullah William Quilliam (b. 1272 AH)
- Hussain Ahmad Madani (b. 1296 AH)
- Muhammad al-Tahir ibn 'Ashur (b. 1296 AH)
- Baha'i Mehmed Efendi (b. 1595-6)

== See also ==
- Category:Shaykh al-Islams of the Religious Council of the Caucasus
- Category:Sheikh-ul-Islams of the Ottoman Empire
- Allamah
- Mufti
- Sheikh
- Sheikh (Sufism)
- Mawlānā
- Hadrat
- Grand Mufti
- Hujjat al-Islam
- Seghatoleslam
- Mohyeddin
