= Mujaddid =

Term meaning one who brings renewal to Islam

A mujaddid (Arabic: مجدد) is an Islamic term for one who brings "renewal" (تجديد, tajdid) to the religion. According to the popular Muslim tradition, it refers to a person who appears at the turn of every century of the Islamic calendar to revitalize Islam, cleansing it of extraneous elements and restoring it to its pristine purity. In contemporary times, a mujaddid is looked upon as the greatest Muslim of a century.

The concept is based on a hadith (a saying of Islamic prophet Muhammad), recorded by Abu Dawood, narrated by Abu Hurairah who mentioned that Muhammad said:

Allah will raise for this community at the end of every 100 years the one who will renovate its religion for it.

— Sunan Abu Dawood, Book 37: Kitab al-Malahim [Battles], Hadith Number 4278

Ikhtilaf (disagreements) exist among different hadith viewers. Some scholars have interpreted that the term mujaddid can also be occasionally understood as plural.

Mujaddids can include prominent scholars and pious rulers. After the fall of the universal Abbasid Caliphate in 1258, the title of Mujaddid began to be claimed by secular rulers to assert the notion of a divinely appointed ruler and that they were given the right to rule by God. One of the first to do this was the Timurid ruler Shah Rukh (1405–1447), followed even more strongly by Uzun Hasan (1452–1478).

== List of claimants or potentials ==
While there is no formal mechanism for designating a mujaddid in Sunni Islam, there is often a popular consensus. The Shia and Ahmadiyya have their own list of mujaddids.

=== First century (July 18, 622 – July 26, 719/1 AH –100 AH) [after the prophetic period] ===
- Umar ibn Abd al-Aziz (682–720)

=== Second century (July 27, 719 – August 1, 816/101 AH – 200 AH) ===
- Imam al-Shafi'i (767–820)
- Imam Ahmad ibn Hanbal (780–855)

=== Third century (August 2, 816 – August 10, 913/201 AH – 300 AH) ===
- Imam Bukhari (810–870)
- Abu al-Hasan al-Ash'ari (874–936)

=== Fourth Century (August 11, 913 – August 19, 1010/301 AH – 400 AH) ===
- Hakim al-Nishaburi (933–1012)
- Abu Bakr Al-Baqillani (950–1013)

=== Fifth century (August 20, 1010 – August 27, 1107/401 AH – 500 AH) ===
- Ibn Hazm (994–1064)
- Abu Hamid al-Ghazali (1058–1111)
- Abdul Qadir Jilani (1078–1166)

=== Sixth century (August 28, 1107 – September 3, 1204/501 AH – 600 AH) ===
- Sultan Salah ad-Din Yusuf ibn Ayyub (1137–1193)
- Mu'in al-Din Chishti (1143–1236)
- Ibn Qudamah (1147–1223)
- Fakhr al-Din al-Razi (1149–1210)
- Abu al-Qasim al-Rafi'i (1160–1226)

=== Seventh century (September 4, 1204 – September 12, 1301/601 AH – 700 AH) ===
- Ibn Daqiq al-'Id (1228–1302)
- Ibn Taymiyyah (1263–1328)
- Ibn Qayyim al-Jawziyya (1292–1350)

=== Eighth century (September 13, 1301 – September 19, 1398/701 AH – 800 AH) ===
- Baha' al-Din Naqshband (1318–1389)
- Siraj al-Din al-Bulqini (1324–1403)
- Ibn Hajar al-Asqalani (1372–1448)

=== Ninth century (September 20, 1398 – September 28, 1495/801 AH – 900 AH) ===
- Zakariyya al-Ansari (1420–1520)
- Sultan Mehmed II (1432–1481)
- Jalaludin Al-Suyuti (1445–1505)

=== Tenth century (September 29, 1495 – October 5, 1592/901 AH – 1000 AH) ===
- Sultan Suleiman I (1494–1566)
- Shams al-Din al-Ramli (1513–1596)
- Ahmad Sirhindi (1564–1624)

=== Eleventh century (October 6, 1592 – October 13, 1689/1001 AH – 1100 AH) ===
- Emperor Aurangzeb Alamgir I (1618–1707)

=== Twelfth century (October 14, 1689 – October 22, 1786/1101 AH – 1200 AH) ===
- Shah Waliullah Dehlawi (1703–1762)
- Muhammad ibn Abd al-Wahhab (1703-1792)
- Shah Abdul Aziz Delhwi (1745–1823)
- Usman Dan Fodio (1754–1817)

=== Thirteenth century (October 23, 1786 – October 31, 1883/1201 AH – 1300 AH) ===
- Muhammad Abduh (1849–1905)
- Mahmud Hasan Deobandi (1851–1920)

=== Fourteenth century (November 1, 1883 – November 7, 1980/1301 AH – 1400 AH) ===
- Sultan Abdülhamid II (1842–1918)
- Abul A'la Maududi (1903–1979)
- Muhammad 'Alawi al-Maliki (1944–2004)

== Claimants in other traditions ==
- Mulla Sadra Shirazi (1571–1640)
- Syed Ahmad Khan (1817–1898)
- Mirza Ghulam Ahmad (1835–1908) (Note: Mirza Ghulam Ahmad is the founder of the Ahmadiyya sect. The Sunni-Shia mainstream and the majority of Muslims reject the Ahmadiyya sect as it believes in non-law bearing prophethood after Muhammad.)
- Syed Mahmub E Khoda (1949–2020)
