= Shaykh Ali al-Khawas =

Shaykh Ali al-Khawas was a prominent 16th-century Muslim Sufi poet and mystic.

== Influence ==
One of Al-Khawas' students was the Egyptian scholar and mystic Sharani.
