= Mohammad Shahabuddin =

Mohammad Shahabuddin is a Muslim male given name, and in modern usage, surname. It is built from the Arabic words Mohammad (Arabic: مُحَمَّد, romanized: Muḥammad) and Shihab al-Din (Arabic: شهاب‌ الدین, romanized: Shihāb ad-Dīn).

It may refer to:

- Muḥammad Shahābuddīn Ghorī (1144–1206), Sultan of the Ghurid Empire
- Muhammad Shahabuddin (1895–1971), Chief Justice of Pakistan
- Mohamed Shahabuddeen (1931–2018), Vice President of Guyana
- Mohammed Shahabuddin (born 1949), President of Bangladesh from 2023 to 2026
- Md. Shahab Uddin (born 1954), Bangladeshi minister
- Mohammad Shahabuddin (Indian politician) (1967–2021), Indian gangster and politician
- Nawabzada Shahabuddin Khan, last Khan of Jandol

== See also ==
- Shahabuddin Ahmed (disambiguation)
