= Ibn Hajar al-Haytami =

16th-century Sunni Muslim Shafi`i scholar

Shaykh al-Islām Ibn Ḥajar al-Haytamī
- ابن حجر الهيتمي المكي
- Title: Al-Ḥāfiẓ

Personal life
- Born: 1503 / 909 AH Cairo, Mamluk Sultanate
- Died: 1566 (aged 62–63) / 974 A.H. Mecca, Ottoman Empire
- Main interest(s): Fiqh, Hadith
- Education: Al-Azhar University

Religious life
- Religion: Islam
- Denomination: Sunni
- Jurisprudence: Shafi'i
- Creed: Ashari

Muslim leader
- Influenced by: Al-Shafi'i Abu al-Hasan al-Ash'ari Nawawi Zakariyya al-Ansari Shihab al-Din al-Ramli
- Influenced: 'Abdul Wahhab Shaʿrānī, Shaykh Yaqub Sarfi Kashmiri, Mulla Ali al-Qari
- Arabic name
- Personal (Ism): Aḥmad
- Patronymic (Nasab): ibn Muḥammad ibn ʿAlī ibn Ḥajar
- Teknonymic (Kunya): Abū al-ʿAbbās
- Epithet (Laqab): Shihāb al-Dīn
- Toponymic (Nisba): al-Haytamī al-Makkī al-Anṣārī

Shaykh al-Islām Shihāb al-Dīn Abū al-ʿAbbās Aḥmad ibn Muḥammad ibn ʿAlī ibn Ḥajar al-Haytamī al-Makkī al-Anṣārī (Note: Arabic: شهاب الدّين أبو العبّاس أحمد بن محمد بن علي بن حجر الهيتمي المكي الأنصاري) known as Ibn Ḥajar al-Haytamī al-Makkī (Arabic: ابن حجر الهيتمي المكي) was a renowned Sunni Egyptian scholar. He was the leading jurist of the Shafi'i school of thought, a mujtahid, muhaddith, historian and theologian. He came from the Banu Sa'd tribe who settled in the Al-Sharqiah province in Egypt. Ibn Hajar was specialized in Islamic Jurisprudence and well known as a prolific writer of the Shâfi'î school. With Shihab al-Din al-Ramli, he represents the foremost resource for fatwa (legal opinion) for the entire late Shâfi‘î school.

== Biography ==
=== Birth and education ===
Ibn Hajar al-Haytamī was born in 909 AH (1503 AD) in the small village Abū Haytam in western Egypt. When he was a small child, his father died and his upbringing was left to the charge of his grandfather. His grandfather was known to the locals as the "stone" because of his pious nature. The nickname came from people saying he was "silent as a stone". This was due to the fact that he seldom spoke and when he did it was greatly revered for his religious knowledge. His grandfather died, however, shortly after his father and his father's teachers Shams Dīn b. Abi'l-Hamā'il and Shams al-Dīn Muhammad al-Shanāwī became his caretakers. As a child he began his studies with the memorisation of the Qur'an and Nawawi's Minhaj. His caretaker al-Shanāwī decided that al-Haytamī should continue his elementary education at the sanctuary of Sayyid Ahmad al-Badawī in Tanta.

Ibn Hajar al-Haytami notes in his writings a beverage called qahwa developed from a tree in the Zeila region.

=== Teachers ===
After completing his elementary education, Ibn Hajar al- Haytamī continued his schooling at al-Azhar where he studied under many scholars.

Some of his notable teachers include:

- Zakariyyah al-Ansari al-Shafi'i al-Azhari (d. 925 AH)
- Abd al-Haq ibn Muhammad al-Shafi'i (d. 931 AH)
- Shihab al-Din Ahmad ibn Sa'igh al-Hanafi (d. 934 AH)
- Shihab al-Din Ahmad ibn Hamzah al-Ramli (d. 952 AH)

=== Migration to Mecca ===
Sheikhuna Al-Haytamī performed the Hajj in the year 1527 with one of his teachers al-Bakri. It was during this trip that al-Haytamī decided to begin writing fiqh. He returned to Mecca in 1531 and stayed there a year before returning home again. During this visit al-Haytamī worked on a compilation of notes which he would later use in his authorship to write commentaries. The last time he traveled to Mecca was in 1533, this time he brought his family and decided to permanently reside there. His life dedication in Mecca began to be writing, teaching, and issuing fatwa. He authored major works in Shāfiʿī jurisprudence, hadīth, tenets of faith, education, hadith commentary, and formal legal opinion. It was at this time he wrote his most notable work, which was called "Tuhfat al-Muhtaj bi Sharh al-Minhaj". This work was a commentary on Imam Nawawi's writing "Minhaj al-Talibin". Ibn Hajar al-Haytamī's commentary became one of the two authoritative textbooks of the Shafi’i school.

He wrote many other works, some of which are listed in the "works" section of this page.

=== Death ===
Ibn Hajar al-Haytamī died in 1566 AD/974 AH in Mecca, in the month of Rajab. He was buried in the cemetery of Ma'lat.

== Views ==
- Regarding singing al-Haytami mentioned that some went so far as to claim the supposed consensus of ahl ul Madinah on this question.
- He was once asked about the legal status of those who criticizes Sufis: Is there an excuse for such critics? He replies in his Fatawa hadithiyya: It is incumbent upon every person endowed with mind and religion not to fall into the trap of criticizing these folk (Sufis), for it is a mortal poison, as has been witnessed of old and recently.
- Regarding logical reasoning: "Consider these words without partisanship and you will find that he…has clarified the way and established the proof to the effect that there is nothing in [logic] which is reprehensible or leads to what is reprehensible, and that it is of use in the religious sciences such as the science of the principles of religion and of jurisprudence (fiqh). The jurist have established the general principle that what is of use for the religious sciences should be respected and may not be derided, and it should be studied and taught as a fard kifaya"

== Works ==
- Al-Sawa'iq al-Muhriqah
- Al-Naimat-ul Kubra Ala al-Alam
- Asma al-Matalib
- Tahrir al-Maqal fi Adab wa Ahkam fi ma yahtaj ilay-ha Mu'addibu al-Atfal
- Mablaghu'l Arab fi Fadayil al-Arab
- Al-Jawhar al-Munazzam fi Ziyarati'l Qabr
- As-Sawayiq al-Muhriqah ala Ahl al-Bidayi wa'd Dalali wa'z Zandaqah
- Tuhfatu'l Muhtaj li Sharh Al-Minhaj (in four volumes)
- Al-Khayrat al-Hisan fi Manaqib Abi Hanifah an-Numan
- "Al Fatawa al-Rizwiyyah
- Al-Fatawa al-Haytamiyyah
- Al-Fatawa al-Hadithiyyah
- Fat'h Al-Ilah Sharh Mishkah
- Al-Eeaab fi Sharh al-Ubab
- Al-Imdad fi Sharh al-Irshad
- Fat'h al-Jawwad bi Sharh al-Irshad
- Al-Fat'h al-Mubin Sharh al-Arbayin an-Nawawiyyah
- Nasihatu'l Muluk
- Asraf al-Wasayil ila Fahmi'sh Shamayil
- Madan al-Yawaqit al-Multamiah fi Manaqib Al-Ayimmah al-Arba'ah
- Al-Minah al-Makkiyyah fi Sharfi Hamziyyah al-Busiriyyah
- Al-Manhaj al-Qawim fi Masayil at-Talim. Sharh Muqadammati'l Hadramiyyah
- Ad-Durar az-Zahirah fi Kashfi Bayani'l Akhirah
- Az-Zawajir an Iqtirafal-Kabayir
- Tahdhir ath-Thiqat min Akli'l Kaftati wa'l Qat
- Al-Iylam bi Qawatiy al-Islam
- Kaffar-Raa'a min Muharramati'l Lahwi wa's Sama'a
- Al-Fatawa al-Fiqhiyyah al-Kubra

== See also ==
- List of Ash'aris
- List of Muslim theologians
- List of Sufis
