= Sharh Sunan Abi Dawud =

15th-century commentary on Sunan Abi Dawud

Sharḥ Sunan Abī Dāwūd
- Editor: Khalid al‑Ribāṭ
- Author: Ibn Raslān
- Original title: شرح سنن أبي داود
- Language: Arabic
- Subject: Hadith Science, Islamic jurisprudence, Aqidah, Arabic grammar, linguistic,
- Genre: Sharh
- Publisher: Dār al‑Falaḥ
- Publication date: 2016
- Publication place: Faiyum, Egypt
- Pages: 14,023
- Preceded by: Safwat al-Zubad

Sharḥ Sunan Abī Dāwūd (Arabic: شرح سنن أبي داود, lit. 'Commentary on the Sunan of Abū Dāwūd’') is a 20-volume commentary on Sunan Abī Dāwūd, one of the six canonical collections of Sunni hadith. It was authored by the 9th-century AH (15th-century CE) Sunni scholar Ibn Raslān. This work is one of the most comprehensive and authoritative commentaries on this pivotal hadith collection. It thoroughly examines the hadiths, analyzes their chains of narration and textual meanings, and provides extensive interpretations and legal applications firmly grounded in the Shafi'i school of Islamic jurisprudence. The commentary is celebrated for its clarity and systematic presentation, making complex hadith accessible to a wide audience of students and scholars.

== Historical Background ==
Ibn Raslan composed his commentary during the late medieval period of Islamic scholarship, a time marked by extensive efforts to consolidate and explicate hadith literature alongside juristic principles. His work reflects the intellectual climate of the 9th century AH, emphasizing rigorous hadith criticism aligned with the Shafi‘i madhhab. The commentary was intended both as an academic reference and a teaching tool for advanced students of hadith and jurisprudence.

== Methodology ==
=== Jurisprudence ===
Ibn Raslan's jurisprudential methodology is deeply rooted in Shafi'i legal theory and principles. He integrates rigorous hadith study with Shafi'i Usul al-Fiqh (principles of jurisprudence) to derive sound legal rulings. Key features include:

- Hierarchical Source Prioritization: Ibn Raslan follows the Shafi'i framework that prioritizes the Qur'an and Sunnah as the primary sources, followed by consensus (ijmā) and analogy (qiyās). He applies these principles meticulously in interpreting hadith to ensure legal coherence.
- Resolving Hadith Conflicts: He skillfully reconciles apparently contradictory hadith by employing contextual analysis, distinguishing general from specific narrations, and identifying abrogation (naskh) where applicable. Additionally, Ibn Raslān often uses the principle of jamʿ (harmonization) to align conflicting narrations, preferring direct textual evidence over analogical reasoning when necessary. His approach reflects a deep understanding of both the hadith corpus and Shāfiʿī jurisprudence, prioritizing textual clarity while maintaining legal coherence.
- Use of Legal Maxims: Ibn Raslan invokes established Shafi'i legal maxims as guiding principles, such as “Certainty is not removed by doubt” (al-yaqīn lā yazūl bi-l-shakk), to underpin his legal conclusions.
- Authenticity and Reliability: A strict emphasis is placed on incorporating only authentic and reliable hadith into legal reasoning, after thorough examination of isnād (chain) and matn (text).
- Clarity and Accessibility: Ibn Raslan's commentary is especially noted for its effort to clarify intricate legal points, making complex jurisprudential issues comprehensible for students, thereby serving as an essential teaching tool.

=== Hadith Sciences ===
Ibn Raslan’s commentary exemplifies advanced hadith methodology, combining textual criticism with legal analysis. His approach includes:

- Meticulous Isnād Evaluation: He carefully investigates the reliability of narrators and the continuity of the transmission chain, adhering to classical hadith sciences.
- Textual (Matn) Analysis: Beyond chains, Ibn Raslan examines the content of narrations for consistency with established doctrine and legal principles, ensuring no contradictions with foundational texts.
- Comparative Hadith Study: He cross-references variants of hadith and related narrations across collections to clarify meanings or resolve ambiguities.
- Incorporation of Hadith Criticism Principles: Drawing on principles like corroboration (tathbit) and abrogation, Ibn Raslan applies these systematically within his commentary.
- Contribution to Hadith Accessibility: His methodical explanations demystify complex hadith narrations, aiding scholars and students in understanding the hadith's legal and spiritual significance.

=== Linguistic Analysis ===
Linguistic precision is a hallmark of Ibn Raslan’s work, enhancing the clarity and interpretative accuracy of his commentary. His linguistic methodology includes:

- Use of Classical Arabic Dictionaries: Ibn Raslan frequently references authoritative lexicons such as Al-Qāmūs al-Muḥīṭ by al-Firuzabadi and Lisan al-Arab by Ibn Manzur to clarify ambiguous or rare terms within the hadith texts.
- Explanation of Rhetorical Nuances: He elaborates on syntactic structures, idiomatic expressions, and semantic subtleties to reveal the intended meaning behind the hadith.
- Clarification of Complex Terms: By providing definitions and context, he ensures that even difficult linguistic elements are made accessible to readers with varying levels of expertise.
- Focus on Clarity and Conciseness: His linguistic explanations aim to present the meanings in a clear and straightforward manner, avoiding unnecessary complexity to facilitate comprehension.

=== Theological Perspectives ===
While primarily focused on jurisprudence and hadith sciences, Ibn Raslan’s commentary also reflects his theological orientation:

- Alignment with Sunni Orthodoxy: Ibn Raslan’s interpretations conform to mainstream Sunni theology, especially Ash'ari creed, which was prevalent among Shafi‘i scholars of his time.
- Clarification of Creed-related Hadith: Where hadith touch on theological points, he carefully explains to avoid misinterpretations, emphasizing orthodox beliefs.
- Balancing Textual Literalism and Rational Interpretation: His commentary demonstrates an effort to maintain textual fidelity while applying reasoned analysis consistent with Sunni theology.

== Features ==
The significance of this work include key features:

- Comprehensive Scope: The 20-volume work covers the entire Sunan Abi Dawud with detailed hadith examination, legal reasoning, theological reflection and linguistic analysis.
- Clear Language and Structure: Systematic presentation aids comprehension for diverse readers, from students to scholars.
- Rigorous Scholarship: Balances critical hadith analysis with Shafi'i jurisprudence and linguistic clarity.
- Educational Impact: Continues to serve as a key resource in hadith and fiqh studies within the Shafi'i tradition.

== Legacy ==
Ibn Raslan's commentary is considered one of the most extensive and thorough explanations of this hadith collection. Sharh Sunan Abi Dawud is widely respected in Islamic academic circles for its meticulous scholarship and pedagogical value. It has influenced subsequent commentators and remains a standard reference for those studying the Shafi'i madhhab and hadith sciences. Contemporary scholars often cite Ibn Raslan when addressing legal and theological interpretations of Sunan Abi Dawud.

== See also ==
- List of Sunni books
- List of hadith books

== Sources ==
- Ali, Ahmed Aaider; NihadKhalil, Ali (15 April 2024). "Foundations of text criticism in hadith commentaries: Ibn Raslan's explanation of Sunan Abu Dawud as an example". Wisdom Journal for Studies and Research. 4 (2 (16)). University of Baghdad: 45–67. doi:10.55165/wjfsar.v4i02.219. ISSN 2769-1926.
- Sharifah Mohammad Hofan al-Qarni (2023). "Imam Ibn Raslan's Approach in Disputed Hadith through his Explanation of Sunan Abu Dawud" (PDF). Iraqi Academic Scientific Journals. 3 (34). Iraqi University: 112–134. ISSN 2225-9732.
- Manar Medhat Kamal Awad El-Sayed (April 2023). "The methodology of Imam Ibn Raslan in critiquing the chapter headings and biographies in the Sunan of Abu Dawud, through his book: Sharh Sunan Abi Dawud". iKNiTO Journal Management System. 24 (24). Port Said University: 29–56. doi:10.21608/jfpsu.2022.129425.1174.
- Montaser Abdul Rahman Saleh, Dr. Ahmed Khalaf Abbas Samiran (2023). "Rule: (Actions are by intentions) Rule: (Actions are by intentions) And its applications according to Ibn Raslan Al-Shafi'i (844 AH) in his book "Explanation of Sunan Abi Dawud"". Journal of Survey in Fisheries Sciences. 10 (3). College of Islamic Sciences, Fallujah University: 6146–6157.
- Israa Mahmood Eıd Eıd (15 March 2024). "Imam Ibn Raslan's methodology in presenting the Qur'anic readings (qirāʾāt), interpreting them, and defending them in his book Sharḥ Sunan Abī Dāwūd". Journal of Eskişehir Osmangazi University Faculty of Theology. 11 (1). Mardin Artuklu University: 30–70. doi:10.51702/esoguifd.1380732.
