= Al-Khatib al-Shirbini =

16th-century Islamic scholar

Al-Khaṭīb ash-Shirbīniy الخطيب الشربيني

Personal life
- Born: Cairo, Mamluk Sultanate
- Died: 977 A.H. / 1570 C.E. Cairo, Ottoman Empire
- Region: Egypt
- Main interest(s): Fiqh, Usul al-Fiqh, Tafsir, Arabic
- Notable idea(s): al-Sirāj al-Munīr, Mughnī al-Muḥtāj ʾilā Maʿrifat Maʿāniy ʾAlfāẓ al-Minhāj
- Education: Al-Azhar University
- Occupation: Scholar of Islam

Religious life
- Religion: Islam
- Denomination: Sunni
- Jurisprudence: Shafi'i
- Creed: Ash'ari

Muslim leader
- Influenced by: Al-Shafi'i Abu Hasan al-Ash'ari Zakariyya al-Ansari Shihab al-Din al-Ramli
- Influenced: Shams al-Din al-Ramli

Shams al-Din Muhammad ibn Ahmad al-Shirbani al-Khatib also known as al-Khaṭīb ash-Shirbīniy (الخطيب الشربيني, was an Egyptian Sunni scholar who specialized in the Shafi'i jurisprudence, legal theory, Qu'ran exegesis, and Arabic language. He had a reputation for wisdom and piety. He completed his studies at Al-Azhar under the tutelage of Zakariyya al-Ansari, Shihab al-Din al-Ramli and others, who gave him permission to offer official legal advice and teaching. His eight volume Mughni al-Muhtaj, a commentary on Al-Nawawi Minhaj al-Talibin, his other well-known three volume commentary, Al-Iqna' fi Halla Alfadh Abi Shuja, which is regarded as one of the best commentaries of one of the most well-known treatises in Shafi'i Fiqh called Matn Abi Shuja and his four volume Quranic exegesis entitled Al-Siraj al-Munir fi al-i'ana ala ma 'rifa ba'd kalam Rabbina al-Hakim al-Khabir. He died in Cairo in the year of 977/1570.

== See also ==
- List of Ash'aris
