= Shams al-Din al-Ramli =

15th-century Islamic scholar

Shams al-Din al-Ramli شمس الدين الرملي
- Title: Shaykh al-Islām; Shams al-Din; Al-Ḥāfiẓ

Personal life
- Born: 1513 Ramla, Mamluk Sultanate
- Died: January 13, 1596 (aged 82–83) / 1004 A.H. Cairo, Ottoman Empire
- Region: Egypt
- Main interest(s): Fiqh, Hadith
- Education: Al-Azhar University
- Occupation: Muhaddith, Scholar, Muslim Jurist

Religious life
- Religion: Islam
- Denomination: Sunni
- Jurisprudence: Shafi'i
- Creed: Ash'ari

Muslim leader
- Influenced by: Al-Shafi'i Abu Hasan al-Ash'ari Shihab al-Din al-Ramli Zakariyya al-Ansari Al-Khatib al-Shirbini
- Influenced: Al-Munawi Ala al-Din al-Babili Abu'l-Mawahib al-Shinnawi

Muḥammad b. Aḥmad b. Ḥamza al-Manūfī al-Miṣrī al-Anṣārī S̲h̲ams al-Dīn (Arabic: شمس الدين الرملي; 1513 – 13 January 1596 CE) also known as Shams al-Din al-Ramli was an Sunni scholar, known as the leading Shafi'i jurist and muhaddith in his era. He was considered the tenth century renewer of Islam and nicknamed the "little Shafi'i". He was the son of scholar Shihab al-Din al-Ramli.

== Biography ==
Shams al-Din was born in Ramla in the year 1513. His father was a jurist and mufti who taught him. He also studied under Zakariyya al-Ansari and Al-Khatib al-Shirbini in Al-Azhar University. After completing his studies, Shams al-Din became the chief Mufti in Egypt, the same position his father had held before him. Upon his father's death, Shams al-Dīn took over his teaching position in the Al-Azhar university. He also taught in the Khashshabiyya and Sharifiyya. Shams al-Din's notable students include Al-Munawi and Ala al-Din al-Babili. He died in Cairo at the date of 13 January 1596.

== Works ==
- Nihayat al-Muhtaj Sharj al-Minhaj, a popular commentary on Al-Nawawi's Minhaj al-Talibin.
- Ghayat al-Bayan, a popular commentary on Ibn Ruslān's 'zubād'.
- Al-Gharar Al-Bahiya, a popular commentary on al-Nawawī's ‘idāh fī manāsik al-hajj’.
- Umdat Al-Rabeh
- A commentary on Shaykh al-Islam's (Zakariyya al-Ansārī) ‘tahrīr'.
- A collection of Fatwa by his father

== See also ==
- List of Ash'aris
