= Al-Sha'rani =

Egyptian Islamic scholar (1492–1565)

'Abd al-Wahhab al-Sha'rani عبد الوهاب ابن أحمد الشعرانى

Personal life
- Born: 1493 Cairo, Mamluk Sultanate
- Died: 5 December 1565 (aged 71–72) Cairo, Egypt Eyalet, Ottoman Empire
- Era: Early modern period
- Region: Egypt
- Main interest(s): Islamic Jurisprudence, Hadith, History, Tasawwuf, Islamic theology
- Notable work(s): Al-Mizan al-Kubra; Al-Tabaqat al-Kubra
- Occupation: Scholar, Jurist, Traditionist, Historian, Sufi, Islamic Theologian

Religious life
- Religion: Islam
- Denomination: Sunni
- Jurisprudence: Shafi'i
- Creed: Ash'ari

Muslim leader
- Influenced by: Al-Shafi'i Abu Hasan al-Ash'ari Ibn Arabi Zakariyya al-Ansari Al-Suyuti Al-Qastallani
- Influenced: Al-Munawi Ibrahim al-Bajuri

Abd al-Wahhab al-Sha'rani (1492/3–1565, AH 898–973, full name Arabic: عبد الوهاب ابن أحمد الشعرانى ʿAbd al-Wahhāb ibn Aḥmad ash-Shaʿrānī) was a highly influential Egyptian scholar. He was an eminent jurist, traditionist, historian, mystic and theologian. He was one of the Islamic revivalists and scholastic saints of the sixteenth century. He is credited for reviving Islam and is one of the most prolific writers of the early Egyptian-Ottoman period. His legal, spiritual, and theological writings are still widely read in the Muslim world today. He is regarded as "one of the last original thinkers in Islam." He was the founder of an Egyptian order of Sufism, eponymously known as Šaʿrāwiyyah. The order gradually declined after Shaʿrani's death, although it remained active until the 19th century.

== Name and Origin ==
Al-Sha'rani claimed that Musa Abu 'Imran, the son of the Sultan of Tlemcen in North Africa, was his ancestor five generations ago. Sheikh Abu Madyan Shu'ayb, the Shadhili Sufi tradition's founder, sent Musa to Egypt as one of his disciples. The family finally made their home in the Monufia province's Sakiyat Abu Sha'ra village, hence the name "Sha'rani."

== Biography ==
=== Birth ===
In a village north of Cairo, Egypt, Abd al-Wahhab Ibn Ahmad al-Sha'rani was born in the years 898 or 899 A.H. (1492/1493 C.E.).

=== Education ===
Despite the fact that he lost his father when he was still a little child, he started his quest for knowledge at a young age. Under the guidance of his brother, he had memorised the Qur'an by the time he was seven years old. He relocated to Cairo with an aim of studying at Al-Azhar University, where he would flourish in his quest for knowledge. He had memorised countless scriptures from all the sacred disciplines in a short period of time. These manuscripts ranged in length from hundreds to thousands of pages and they include Al-Minhaj by Al-Nawawi, Alfiyyah Malik by Ibn Malik, Al-Tawhid by Ibn Hisham, and other valuable books. He also memorized the book “Al-Rawd Mukhtasar Al-Rawdah”, which is considered one of the most comprehensive books on the jurisprudence of the Shafi’i school. It was in this school where he gained his high fame. Al-Sha'rani's impressive study of all four schools of Islamic jurisprudence places him among the elite and of the few Islamic scholars in history to master all four Sunni madhabs. He was in love with hadith sciences and exhaustively worked hard in mastering it and he took the path of Sufism and strived for himself after mastering the Arabic sciences.

=== Teachers ===
Al-Sha'rani elaborated extensively in mentioning his sheikhs in his books, and showed the extent of his veneration for them, especially in his book “Al-Tabaqat al-Kubra”, and mentioned that they are about fifty of them. The most famous amongst them were intellectual giants in Islamic history:

- Shaykh al-Islam Zakariyya al-Ansari
- Shaykh al-Islam al-Suyuti
- Al-Hafid al-Qastallani
- Shaykh al-Islam Shihab al-Din al-Ramli

== Spiritual Journey ==
Al-Sha'rani sought a Sufi shaykh after achieving the greatest levels of proficiency in the Islamic disciplines. He made the decision to proceed with Shaykh Ali al-Khawas, who, following a brief conversation, gave al-Sha'rani the order to sell all of his numerous books and give the earnings to the needy. Al-Sha'rani sold all of his books, but he hung onto one because it was special to him. Al-Sha'rani wondered aloud, "Is this book really worth risking my journey to Allah?" as he made his way to al-Khawas' home. He turned around right away and sold the book. Al-Sha'rani was ordered to withdraw into seclusion for a whole year with the stringent condition of avoiding all gatherings of Islamic knowledge after informing al-Khawas that he had completed this assignment. Only then did al-Khawas take him on as a close friend and personally direct his spiritual journey. Only a few days after he began his spiritual journey to Allah (God), his friendship with Shaykh Ali al-Khawas began to bear spiritual fruit, and al-Sha'rani would eventually take over his teacher's position of authority on the path.

== Death ==
Al-Sha’rani died on 12 Jumada 973 AH/5 December 1565 AD). His final words on Earth were: “I am going to my Lord, the Merciful, the Munificent.” He was buried in the Zawiya that had been created for him. As the leader of Zawiya and the tariqa, his son 'Abd al-Rahim succeeded him.

== Views ==
=== Sufism ===
Al-Sha'rani stands for the traditional, moderately ascetic, non-political, and orthodox strain of Egyptian Sufism. Although Shadhili ethics and literature had an impact on him, he did not identify with that tariqa because he found it to be too aristocratic. Socially, he belonged to the Badawiyya, the tariqa of Ahmad al-Badawi, whom he admired, but he also vehemently opposed the Badawiyya and other such Sufi orders for their excesses, their disdain for Sharia law, and their lack of respect for the ulama. Al-Sha'rani also disparages the Khalwati order, which was once prominent among Turkish soldiers, claiming that it encourages hallucinations rather than genuine religious experience. He never expresses his own tariqa affiliation and generally aligns with the tariq al-Kawn, or Al-Junayd's alternative approach. His introduction into 26 tariqas appears to have been merely ceremonial or done to earn barakah.

Al-Sha'rani exposed frauds and impostors posing as Sufis in his work al-Tabaqat. He was very critical and harsh towards charlatans who engage in innovation that go against the Book and Sunnah.

=== Fiqh ===
His seminal work Al-Mīzan al-Kubra (The Supreme Scale), al-Sha'rani present a theory based on Sufi presumptions that strives to unite or at least equalise the four madhabs and emphasises the need to reduce the gaps between them. In contrast to the opinions held by their narrow-minded imitators (Muqallid), he thought there were no fundamental differences between the founders of the madhab. As saints, the founders had access to the Source of the Law. There is only one Sharia, he claims, and it has two standards: one that is harsh for those who are steadfast in their faith and one that is lenient for those who are not. Al-Sha'rani often condemned the fuqaha (jurists) for burdening the common people with intricate legal issues that had little bearing on the core principles of Islam.

=== Ibn Arabi ===
In his capacity as a historian of Sufism and as a defender of it, Al-Sha'rani assembled collections of Tabakat that contained the lives and sayings of Sufis. He maintains that genuine Sufis have never violated the Shar'ia in word or deed, and that any appearance to the contrary is the result of misunderstanding, erroneous interpretation, a lack of comprehension of Sufi terminology, or interpolation by adversaries. Al-Sha'rani made this decision to uphold the orthodoxy of the great mystic Shaykh al-Akhbar Muhyi al-Din Ibn al-Arabi, whose principles he epitomises in his Al-Yawakit wa 'I-djawahir by simplifying the mystic's complex doctrines. Al-Sha'rani, like Al-Suyuti before him, maintained that one should regard Ibn Arabi as a great saint but refrain from reading his problematic books.

== Works ==
- Al-Ajwiba-t al-Marḍiyya
- Al-Kibrīt al-Aḥmar
- Al-Mīzan al-Kubra (The Supreme Scale) [Arabic ed. Cairo: al-Maṭābi` al-Amīriyya, 1900. 2 vols.]
- Al-Tabaqat al-Kubra (The supreme levels)
- Lata'if al-minan wa al-akhlaq (Subtleties of gifts and character)
- Lawaqih al-anwar al-qudsiyya (The fecundating sacred illuminations)
- Kitab al-yawaqit wa al-jawahir fī bayan 'aqa'id al-akabir (The book of rubies and jewels: an explanation of the tenets of faith of mystic luminaries).
- Al-Jawahir wa al-Durar (The jewels and pearls)
- Durar al-Ghawas li sayyidi Ali al-Khawas
- Al-Kawkab al-shahiq fī al-farq bayn al-Mureed al-sadiq wa Ghayri sadiq
- Mawazin al-qaswirin min shuyukhin wa muridin
- al-Fulk al-mashḥūn fī bayān anna l-taṣawwuf huwa mā takhluqu bihi al-'ulamā' al-'āmilūn
- Muẖtaṣar taḏkira-t as-Suwaydī fī l-ṭibb
- Lubāb al-ʾiʿrāb al-māniʿ min al-laḥn fī al-Sunna wa-l-Kitāb, which, as shown by Almog Kasher, is an abridgment of a grammar authored by Ṭāhir b. ʾAḥmad al-Qazwīnī al-Naǧǧār (d. 575/1179 or 580/1184–1185).

== See also ==
- List of Sufis
- List of Ash'aris
- List of Muslim theologians

== Sources ==
- C. Brockelmann, Geschichte der arabischen Litteratur (GAL), 1st edition, 2 vols. (Leiden: Brill, 1889–1936), vol. 2, pp. 335–8.
- M. Winter, 'Shaʿrānī' in Gibbs et al. (eds.), The Encyclopaedia of Islam, 2nd edition, 11 vols. (Leiden: E.J. Brill, 1960–2002), vol. 9, p. 316.
