= Shahab ol Din, Kurdistan =

Shahab ol Din شهاب الدين
- Village
- Location within Iran
- Coordinates: 34°59′44″N 47°59′33″E
- Country: Iran
- Province: Kurdistan
- County: Qorveh
- Bakhsh: Chaharduli
- Rural District: Chaharduli-ye Gharbi

Population (2006)
  - Total: 401
- Time zone: UTC+3:30 (IRST)
  - Summer (DST): UTC+4:30 (IRDT)

Shahab ol Din (Persian: شهاب الدين, also Romanized as Shahāb ol Dīn, Shahāb od Dīn, and Shahābuddīn) is a village in Chaharduli-ye Gharbi Rural District, Chaharduli District, Qorveh County, Kurdistan Province, Iran. At the 2006 census, its population was 401, in 75 families. The village is populated by Kurds.
