= Shahabuddin Ahmed (captain) =

Bangladeshi independence activist and pilot (1948–2025)

- Native name: সাহাবউদ্দিন আহমেদ
- Born: 1948; Faridpur, East Bengal, Pakistan
- Died: 16 October 2025 (aged 77) Dhaka, Bangladesh
- Allegiance: Bangladesh
- Branch: Bangladesh Air Force (Mukti Bahini)
- Service years: 1971
- Rank: Flight Lieutenant
- Conflicts: Bangladesh Liberation War
- Awards: Bir Uttom
- Spouse: Rokeya Nargis
- Children: 2

Shahabuddin Ahmed (1948 – 16 October 2025) was a Bangladeshi independence activist and pilot who was awarded the Bir Uttom, the second-highest gallantry award of Bangladesh, for his actions during the Bangladesh Liberation War.

== Early and personal life ==
Ahmed was born in Char Kamalapur, Faridpur, in 1948. His parents were Giasuddin Ahmed and Laili Rashid. He was married to Rokeya Nargis, and they had two children.

== Career ==
At the start of the Bangladesh Liberation War in 1971, Ahmed was working for Pakistan International Airlines. On 7 April 1971, he left for India and began organising activities in support of the Liberation War.

On 28 September, the Air Wing of the Mukti Bahini was officially formed, and Ahmed joined it. They flew out of Dimapur Air Base in Nagaland, India. He was initially trained to fly fighter aircraft but was later reassigned to helicopters due to a shortage of personnel. Though he had no prior experience flying helicopters, he became skilled within days of training.

Ahmed participated in around 10 missions during the war. Ahmed also narrowly escaped death in other missions, including one on 6 December in Moulvibazar District and another on 7 December in Shamshernagar, Sylhet District, when enemy fire damaged his helicopter. One of his most daring operations occurred on 11 December 1971, near Raipura, Narsingdi District, where Indian paratroopers came under heavy attack by Pakistani forces. In response to a distress call, Ahmed and his team (including pilot Badrul Alam and a gunner) flew in an armed helicopter to support them. The helicopter had to fly dangerously low under heavy enemy fire. Despite this, they were able to attack, which led to the death of at least 20 Pakistani soldiers and the injury of another 24–25, forcing the Pakistan Army to retreat.

=== After the independence ===
The Government of Bangladesh awarded Ahmed the Bir Uttom award for his actions during the war. After the war, he met with President Sheikh Mujibur Rahman on 16 January 1972. He requested that aircraft used during the war, including a DC-3 aircraft donated by the Maharaja of Jodhpur, be given to Biman Bangladesh Airlines. Rahman agreed, and the aircraft were given to Biman. Ahmed retired from Biman Bangladesh Airlines in 2007. He had emphasised the importance of honouring the sacrifices of the freedom fighters and holding war criminals accountable.

Ahmed died at his residence in Gulshan, Dhaka, on 16 October 2025, at the age of 77.
