= Shahabuddin Ahmed (artist) =

Bangladeshi painter

- শাহাবুদ্দিন আহমেদ
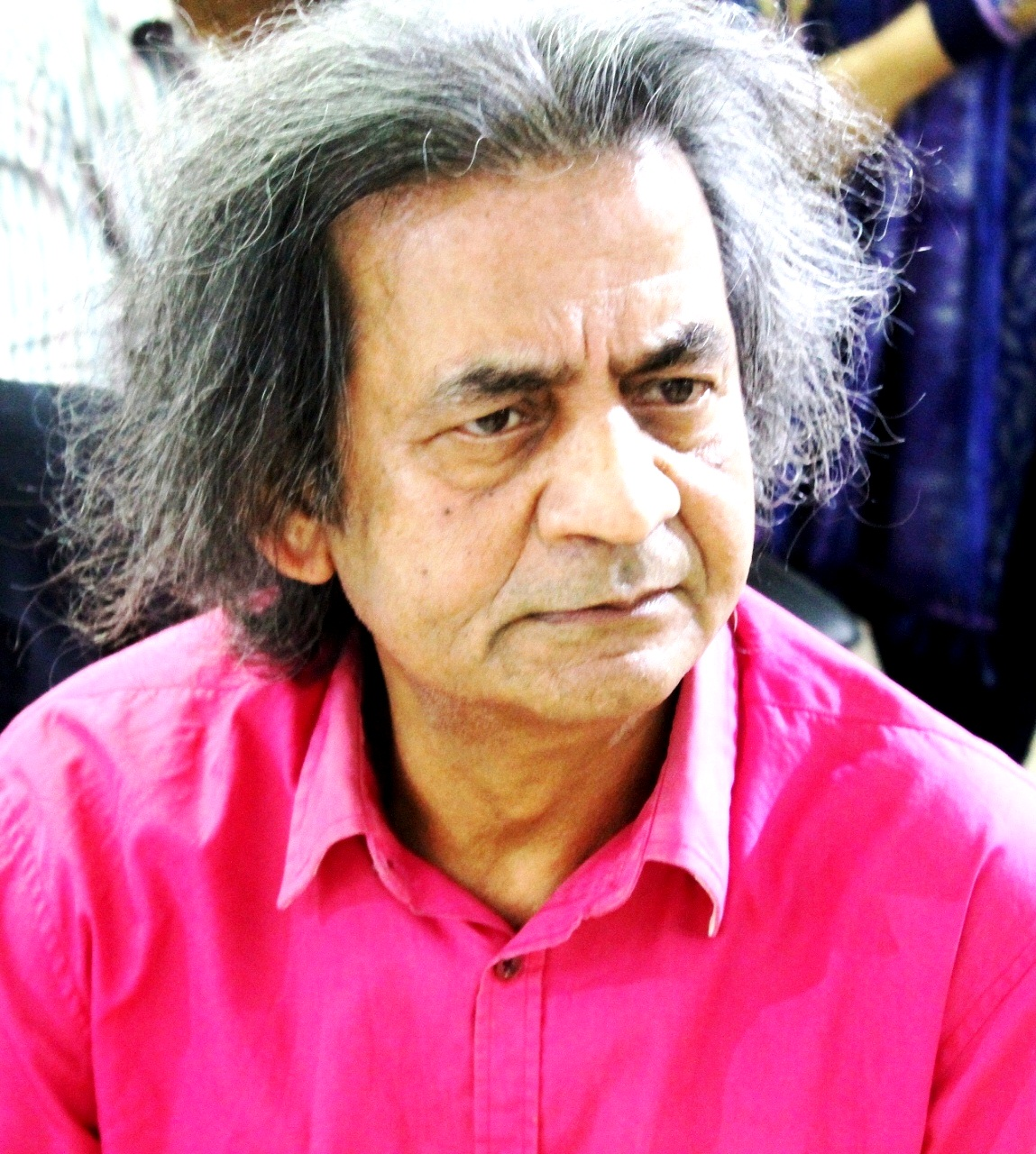
- Ahmed in 2016
- Born: 11 September 1950 (age 76); Narsingdi District, Dominion of Pakistan
- Education: University of Dhaka; École nationale supérieure des Beaux-Arts
- Occupation: Painter

Shahabuddin Ahmed (born 11 September 1950) is a Bangladeshi painter. He was awarded the Chevalier De L'ordre Des Arts Et Des Lettres (Knight in the Order of Fine Arts and Humanities) by the Ministry of Cultural Affair and Communication of France in 2014. He was the recipient of Independence Day Award by the Government of Bangladesh in 2000. His paintings are displayed in galleries like Olympic Museum, Lausanne, Switzerland, Municipal Museum of Bourg-en-Bresse, France, Seoul Olympic Museum, South Korea, the National Taiwan Museum and Bangladesh National Museum.

== Education ==
Ahmed studied at Dhaka Art College (now Faculty of Fine Arts, University of Dhaka) before obtaining a scholarship to study at the École nationale supérieure des Beaux-Arts in Paris during 1974–1981.

== Career ==
Ahmed served as a platoon commander for the Bangladesh Liberation War in 1971, before studying art, and his experiences in the war are clearly reflected in his artwork. He was member of guerilla team Crack Platoon He has painted numerous scenes from the war (e.g. the Killing of the Intellectuals) as well as portraits of key figures such as Sheikh Mujibur Rahman.

Ahmed's works are displayed in many galleries around the globe including the Olympic Museum of Lausanne in Switzerland, Bangladesh National Museum, Bulgarian National Museum in Sofia, Seoul Olympic Museum of South Korea and Bourg-en Bresse Museum France as well as in India, United States, and England.

Ahmed's paintings are permanently displayed in Galerie Daniel Besseiche, Galerie Samagra, Galerie du Fleuve in Paris 6ème (rue Jacob, rue de Seine, sur Guénégaud) Galerie Jas de la Rimade in south of France (Carcès near to Aix-en-Provence) Galerie Daniel Besseiche in Courchevel, Deauville and Saint-Tropez. His paintings are often sold by auction in Drouot, Artcurial, Christie's, and Versailles Enchères.

Ahmed currently lives in Paris.

== Painting style ==
Ahmed's painting style is iconic. It stands out from the work of all his fellow Bangladeshi artists. He has a distinct oil on canvas style that is heavily influenced by European artists. It is argued that Shahabuddin is greatly inspired by European artists from the 1980s, especially that of Francis Bacon.

Ahmed's works rely on minimalism and stark realism. Despite his European style, he would always address his subject matter as something related closer to home. His works are often described as "…baroque-like figures turned towards space seeking light and energy." In his work, the subject is suspended in a mass of monochrome blank space and consists of mostly earthy tones, with perhaps one pop of color. His work is also described as "… figures [that] seem to be enthralled in the cosmic dance at times merging with the ethereal forces."

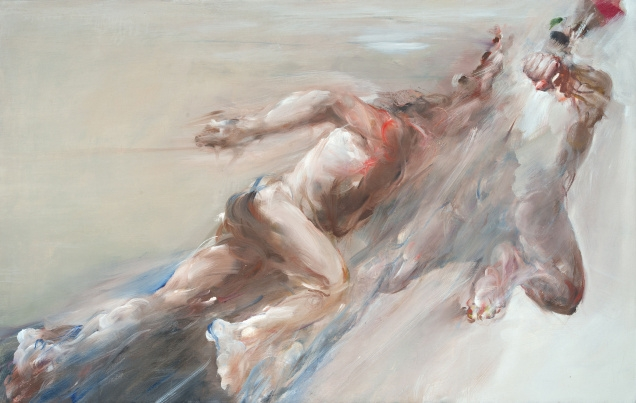
The Freedom Fighter- one of Ahmed's work

One of Ahmed's most popular work of art is the Freedom Fighter, showing a figure in motion. This is another characteristic of his works- his subjects appear to be in motion and parts of the subject is always in a blur, gently mixing in with the background. However, some parts of the subject is always distinctively in focus, so much so that you can differentiate every muscle and sinew that is present in it in perfect proportion. This is one of the aspects of Shahabuddin's art that makes him different from his fellow contemporary artists from Bangladesh. His work is described as "The imagery of fearless human figures, which are in the motion of running, seems to burst free from their skin with their flesh, blood, and sinew…"

Although much of his works are about the Liberation War, Shahabuddin has declared that he detested violence and his art was representative of the struggles that he had to overcome as someone who was involved in the war. He also has painted many portraits of important figures such as Sheikh Mujibur Rahman and Mahatma Gandhi.

== Awards ==
- 2014 : Chevalier de l'ordre des Arts et des Lettres (Knight in the order of Art & Literature) Paris, France.
- 2000 : Independence Day Award
- 1992 : Olympiad of Arts "50 Master Painters of Contemporary Art" Barcelona, Spain
- 1986 : Honourable Mention Award, 3rd Asian Art Biennal, Dhaka, Bangladesh
- 1982 : Best Award in painting,"Young Artists Art Exhibition" Bangladesh Shilpakala Academy, Dhaka, Bangladesh
- 1981 : Gold Medal, Salon du Printemps, Paris, France
- 1980 : 1st Prize, Exhibition of Painters from 31 countries UNESCO, Paris, France
- 1975 : Gold Medal, Salon du Printemps, Paris, France
- Silver Medal, Salon des Artistes Français, Paris, France

== Art collections ==
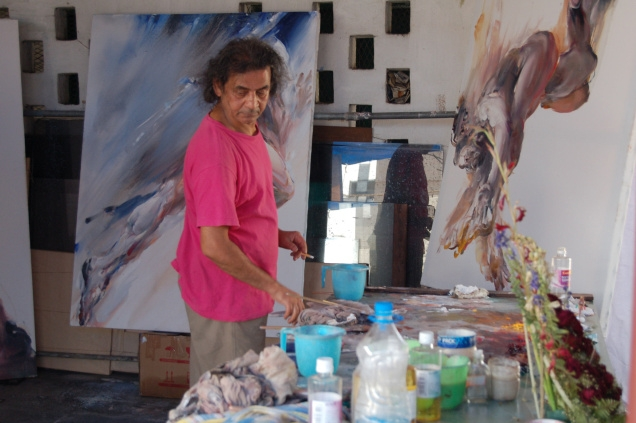
Ahmed at work

Shahabuddin has created countless paintings. Unlike many artists, Shahabuddin has numerous paintings stored in many collections spread all over the world. There are many stored in private collections, of course. Here are some public collections of Shahabuddin's art work from various countries:

- Bangobondhu Sriti Museum Dhaka, Bangladesh
- Bangladesh National Museum, Dhaka, Bangladesh
- National Art Gallery Bangladesh Shilpakala Academy, Dhaka, Bangladesh
- Bengal Foundation, Dhaka, Bangladesh
- Seoul Olympic Museum, South Korea
- National Museum of Taiwan, Taiwan
- National Museum of Bulgaria, Sofia, Bulgaria
- Olympic Museum of Lausanne, Switzerland
- Museum of Bourg-en-Bresse, France

== Exhibitions ==
Ahmed has taken part in countless exhibitions all over the world. His work has been viewed and appreciated by people from numerous counties. His exhibitions are listed below just to give an idea of how far his work has reached.

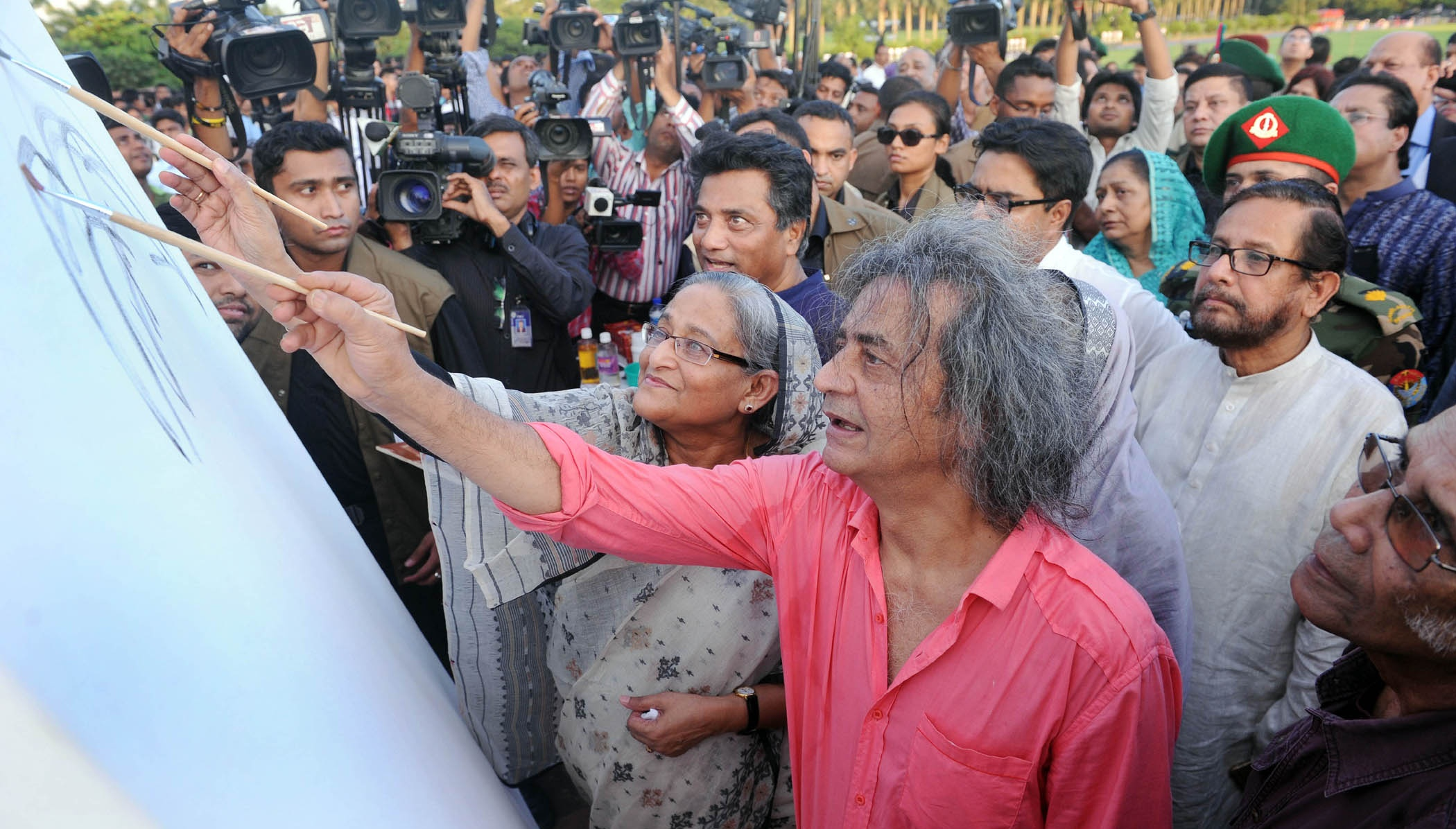
Prime Minister Sheikh Hasina and Shahabuddin Ahmed drawing together during the inauguration of the 'Chitrogathay Shokgatha' exhibition in the Jatiya Sangsad commemorating the martyrdom of Sheikh Mujibur Rahman. (August 2015)

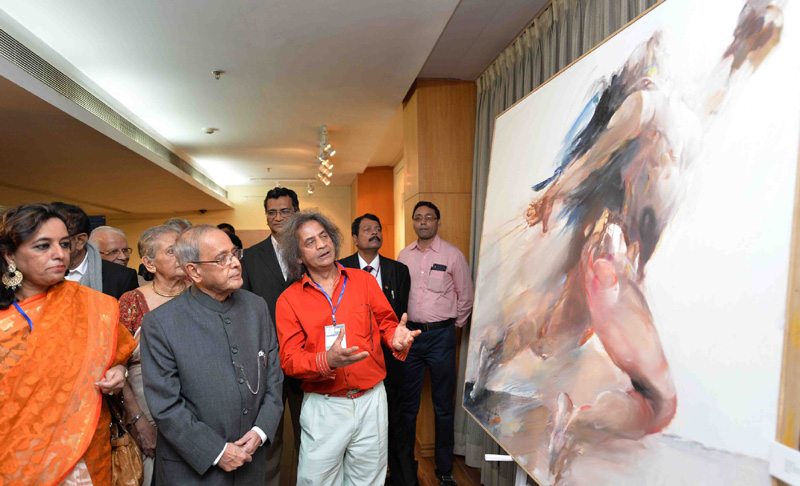
Indian President Pranab Mukherjee visiting the exhibition of Ahmed, organized by the Ganges Art Gallery (December 2015)

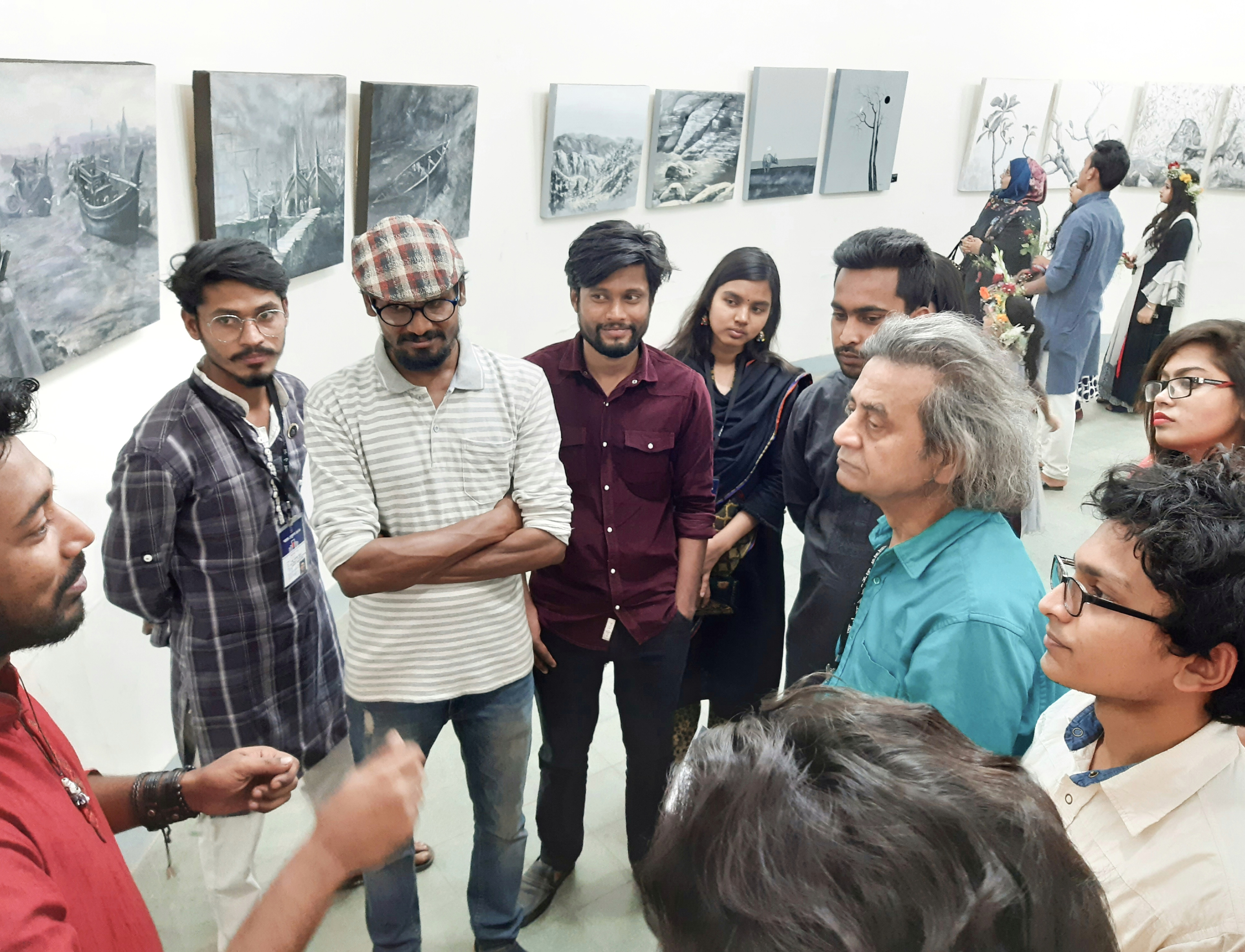
Shahabuddin Ahmed visiting an art exhibition of fine arts students as a guest, organized by the students of the Faculty of Fine Arts (FFA) of Dhaka University at exhibition hall of FFA on 21 February 2020.

Major solo exhibitions

- 1973 : College of Arts & Crafts, Dhaka, Bangladesh
- 1975 : Cultural Center of Groningen, Holland
- Gallery Voude-Port, Royan, France
- FIAP Art Gallery, Paris, France
- 1976 : Cité des Arts, Paris, France
- 1977 : Cultural Center, University of Varsovie, Poland
- 1978 : Gallery de la Maison des Beaux-Arts, Paris, France
- 1979 : College of Arts & Crafts, Dhaka, Bangladesh
- 1980 : House of Fine Arts Gallery, Paris, France
- 1981 : Gallery Voude-Port, Royan, France
- 1981 : Bangladesh Shilpakala Academy, Dhaka, Bangladesh
- 1983 : Bangladesh Shilpakala Academy, Dhaka, Bangladesh
- 1984 : Gallery de l'Agence, Paris, France
- 1985 : Gallery Nationale, Dakar, Senegal
- Bangla Academy, Dhaka, Bangladesh
- 1986 : Bangladesh Shilpakala Academy, Dhaka, Bangladesh
- Alliance Française, Dhaka, Bangladesh
- 1987 : Gallery Pierre Parrat, Paris, France
- Gallery Carlier, Le Touquet, France
- 1988 : Gallery Pierre Cardin, Cannes, France
- Gallery Contraste, Lille, France
- 1989 : Gallery Carlier, Le Touquet, France
- Gallery Centrast, Brussels, Belgium
- Gallery Pierre Parrat, Paris, France
- Gallery Gabrielle Fliegans, Strasbourg, France
- Bangladesh National Museum, Dhaka, Bangladesh
- 1990 : Espace d'Art Contemporain, Quimper, France
- Gallery Gabrielle Fliegans, Monaco, France
- Gallery des Carmes, Rouen, France
- Gallery Marie Thérèse Wagner, Thionville, France
- Cultural Centre, Bourg-en-Bresse, France
- Gallery Atelier 80, Bordeaux, France
- 1991: Gallery Samagra, Paris, France
- Gallery Arbitraire, Dôle (Jura) France
- Gallery Evelyne Guichard, Aoste, Italy
- 1992 : Ethnic Art Gallery, Switzerland
- 1993 : Gallery Samagra, Paris, France
- Bangladesh Shilpakala Academy, Dhaka, Bangladesh
- Gallery Atelier 80, Bordeaux, France
- Gallery Pyramide Pernod, Créteil, France
- 1994 : Birla Academy of Fine Arts and Culture, Kolkata, India
- Vadhera Art Gallery, Delhi, India
- 1995 : Shilpangan, Contemporary Art Gallery, Dhaka, Bangladesh
- "Portrait de Gandhi" Gallery Mohanjeet Grewal, Paris, France
- 1996 : Gallery Brûlée, Strasbourg, France
- " A return to India" Ashutosh Gallery, Kolkata, India
- Gallery Samagra, Paris, France
- 1997 : Gallery Epoke, Copenhagen, Denmark
- 1998 : Gallery Arbitraire, Dôle (Jura) France
- Gallery Mohanjeet Grewal, Mohanjeet Grewal, Paris, France
- 1999 : Gallery "Arts Vivendi" Munich, Germany
- Yazienki Krolenskie Museum, Varsovie, Poland
- Contemporary Art Center Spezia, La Spezia, Italy
- 2000 : "The Harmony Show" Nehru Center, Mumbai, India
- 2000 : Gallery Jacob-1, Paris, France
- Shilpangan, Contemporary Art Gallery, Dhaka, Bangladesh
- 2001 : Gallery Jacob-1, Paris, France
- Gallery Jas de la Rimade, Carcès, France
- 2002 : Gallery Raymond Joseph, Aix en Provence, France
- 2003 : India Habitat Center, Delhi, India
- 2004 : Gallery du Fleuve, Paris, France
- Gallery Bouchindhomme, Lille, France
- "Les dîners de l'Art Contemporain" Europe Zen Factory, Paris, France
- El Almundin Museum, Valence, Spain
- Gallery de Arte Contemporaneo Jorge Ontiveros, Alicante, Spain
- 2005 : Gallery Lazoukine, Deauville, France
- Foundation Jaime II "El Just" Monastere Royal de Santa-Maria de Valdigna, Valence, Spain
- 2006 : Contemporary Art Museum of Elche, Elche, Spain
- Gallery Bouchindhomme, Lille, France
- 2006–2008 : Three exhibitions Gallery Daniel Besseiche, Paris, France
- 2007 : Indian Contemporary Art Institute, Mumbai, India
- Gallery Lazoukine, Deauville, France
- 2008 : Ganges Art Gallery, Kolkata, India
- 2009 : La Salle Cai-Luzan, Zaragoza, Spain
- "Joy Bangla" Bengal Gallery of Fine Arts, Dhaka, Bangladesh
- Maison des Arts de Châtillon, Châtillon, France
- 2011 : Ganges Art Gallery, Kolkata, India
- 2012 : Gallery Lazoukine, Deauville, France
- Bangladesh National Museum, Dhaka, Bangladesh
- Gallery Daniel Besseiche, Paris, France
- Gallery Daniel Besseiche, Geneva, Switzerland
- 2013 : Gallery Jas de la Rimade, Carcès, France
- Gallery 21, Dhaka, Bangladesh
- Gallery Chitrak, Dhaka, Bangladesh
- 2014 : Gallery Brûlée, Strasbourg, France

Major group exhibitions

- 1974 : Silver Jubilee Commemorative show, College of Arts & Crafts, Dhaka, Bangladesh
- 1977 : FIAP Art Gallery, Paris, France
- 1979 : Exhibitions of Painters from 31 countries UNESCO, Paris, France
- 1981 : International Students Painting exhibition, CROUS, Paris, France
- 1982 : Young Artists exhibition, Bangladesh Shilpakala Academy, Dhaka, Bangladesh
- 1983 : Second Asian Art Biennal Bangladesh Shilpakala Academy, Dhaka, Bangladesh
- 1985 : Contemporary Art of Bangladesh, Kuala Lumpur, Malaysia
- 1986 : Gallery Pierre Parrat, Paris, France
- Gallery Carlier, Le Touquet, France
- 1988 : Olympiad of Arts, Seoul, South Korea
- Contemporary Art of Bangladesh, Beijing, China
- 1989 : Museum of Contemporary Art, Taichung, Taiwan
- Colour of Life, Paris, France
- Salon des Arts Contemporains, Paris, France
- Museum of Bourg-en-Bresse, France
- Gallery Contraste, Brussels, Belgium
- 1990 : Gallery Pluriels, Deauville, France
- Espace Belleville d'Art Contemporain, Paris, France
- 1991 : Gallery Atelier 80, Bordeaux, France
- 1992 : Olympiad of Arts "50 Master Painters of Contemporary Art" Barcelona, Spain
- African Art Biennal, Dakar, Senegal
- 1995 : "Bombay" Jahangir Art Gallery, Mumbai, India
- 1996 : L'Art du Marché, Saint-Cloud, France
- "The Harmony show"Nehru Centre, Mumbai, India
- Gallery Clemengis, Châlons-en-Champagne, France
- Gallery Barbara Moran, Massachusetts, US
- 1997 : "The Harmony show"Nehru Centre, Mumbai, India
- 1999 : Contemporary Art Center Spezia, La Spezia, Italy
- Cigares de la Havane, Society Tabacalara & Club Epicur de fumeurs de cigares, Cuba
- 2000 : Gallery Brûlée, Strasbourg, France
- Cigares de la Havane, Gallery Flake, Paris, France
- 2001 : Espace Belleville drawing exhibition, Paris, France
- 2002 : Seoul Art Centre, Seoul, South Korea
- Maison des Arts de Châtillon, Châtillon, France
- 2008 : Contemporary Bangladesh Art Week, New York City
- Bengal Gallery of Fine Arts, Dhaka, Bangladesh
- 2013 : Ganges Art Gallery, India Art Fair, New Delhi
- 2014 : Ganges Arts Gallery, India Art Fair, New Delhi
- Dhaka Art Summit, Dhaka, Bangladesh
- 2015 : Ganges Art Gallery, India Art Fair, New Delhi
