= Ibn al-Majdi =

Egyptian mathematician and astronomer (1359–1447)

Ibn al‐Majdī
- Born: 1359; Cairo, Mamluk Sultanate, now Egypt
- Died: 27 January 1447 (aged 88); Cairo, Mamluk Sultanate, now Egypt
- Occupations: Astronomer, mathematician, engineer, grammarian, faqih, calendars
- Era: Mamluk era (Islamic Golden Age)

Ahmad bin Rajab bin Taibugha al-Majdī al-ala’i bin Abdullah Shihāb al‐Dīn Abu al-Abbas (Arabic: أحمد بن رجب بن طيبغا المجدي العلائي بن عبد الله شهاب الدين أبو العباس; 1359–1447 CE) was an Egyptian mathematician and astronomer. His most important mathematical work was "Book of Substance", a voluminous commentary on the Summary of the Operations of Calculations by Ibn al-Banna'.
