= Islamic world =

Muslim-majority countries, states, districts, or towns

World percentage of Muslims by country (2012 data)

These are the terms Islamic world and Muslim world commonly refer to the Islamic community, which is also known as the Ummah. This consists of all those who adhere to the religious beliefs, politics, and laws of Islam or to societies in which Islam is practiced. In a modern geopolitical sense, these terms refer to countries in which Islam is widespread, although there are no agreed criteria for inclusion. The term Muslim-majority countries is an alternative often used for the latter sense.

The history of the Muslim world spans about 1,400 years and includes a variety of socio-political developments, as well as advances in the arts, science, medicine, philosophy, law, economics and technology during the Islamic Golden Age. Muslims look for guidance to the Quran and believe in the prophetic mission of the Islamic prophet Muhammad, but disagreements on other matters have led to the appearance of different religious schools of thought and sects within Islam. Early Muslim conquests culminated in the Umayyad Caliphate being established across three continents (Asia, Africa, and Europe). In the modern era, most of the Muslim world came under European colonial domination. The nation states that emerged in the post-colonial era have adopted a variety of political and economic models, and they have been affected by secular as well as religious trends.

As of 2013, the combined GDP (nominal) of 50 Muslim majority countries was US$5.7 trillion. As of 2016, they contributed 8% of the world's total. In 2020, the Economy of the Organisation of Islamic Cooperation which consists of 57 member states had a combined GDP(PPP) of US$ 24 trillion which is equal to about 18% of world's GDP or US$ 30 trillion with 5 OIC observer states which is equal to about 22% of the world's GDP. Some OIC member countries - Ivory Coast, Guyana, Gabon, Mozambique, Nigeria, Suriname, Togo and Uganda are not Muslim-majority.

As of 2020, 1.8 billion or more than 25% of the world population are Muslims. By the percentage of the total population in a region considering themselves Muslim, 91% in the Middle East-North Africa (MENA), 89% in Central Asia, 40% in Southeast Asia, 31% in South Asia, 30% in sub-Saharan Africa, 25% in Asia, 1.4% in Oceania, 6% in Europe, and 1% in the Americas.

Most Muslims are of one of two denominations: Sunni Islam (87–90%) and Shia (10–13%). However, other denominations exist in pockets, such as Ibadi (primarily in Oman). Muslims who do not belong to, do not self-identify with, or cannot be readily classified under one of the identifiable Islamic schools and branches are known as non-denominational Muslims. About 13% of Muslims live in Indonesia, the largest Muslim-majority country; 31% of Muslims live in South Asia, the largest population of Muslims in the world; 20% in the Middle East–North Africa, where it is the dominant religion; and 15% in Sub-Saharan Africa and West Africa (primarily in Nigeria). Muslims are the overwhelming majority in Central Asia, make up half of the Caucasus, and widespread in Southeast Asia. India has the largest Muslim population outside Muslim-majority countries. Pakistan, Bangladesh, Iran, and Egypt are home to the world’s second, fourth, sixth and seventh largest Muslim populations respectively. Sizeable Muslim communities are also found in the Americas, Russia, India, China, and Europe. Islam is the fastest-growing major religion in the world partially due to their high birth rate, according to the same study, religious switching has no impact on Muslim population, since the number of people who embrace Islam and those who leave Islam are roughly equal. China has the third largest Muslim population outside Muslim-majority countries, while Russia has the fifth largest Muslim population. Nigeria has the largest Muslim population in Africa, while Indonesia has the largest Muslim population in Asia.

== Terminology ==
The term has been documented as early as 1912 to encompass the influence of perceived pan-Islamic propaganda. The Times described Pan-Islamism as a movement with power, importance, and cohesion born in Paris, where Turks, Arabs and Persians congregated. The correspondent's focus was on India: it would take too long to consider the progress made in various parts of the Muslim world. The article considered the position of the Amir, the effect of the Tripoli Campaign, Anglo-Russian action in Persia, and "Afghan Ambitions".

In a modern geopolitical sense, the terms 'Muslim world' and 'Islamic world' refer to countries in which Islam is widespread, although there are no agreed criteria for inclusion. Some scholars and commentators have criticised the term 'Muslim/Islamic world' and its derivative terms 'Muslim/Islamic country' as "simplistic" and "binary", since no state has a religiously homogeneous population (e.g. Egypt's citizens are c. 10% Christians), and in absolute numbers, there are sometimes fewer Muslims living in countries in which they make up the majority than in countries in which they form a minority. Moreover, the idea of a uniform Muslim world is imagined. Emerging in popular discourse in the nineteenth century, imperialists used the term to emphasize the civilizational differences between east and west. In opposition to colonization some Muslims started using the term in attempts at providing a unified front against Western imperialism. Hence, the term 'Muslim-majority countries' is often preferred in literature.

== History ==
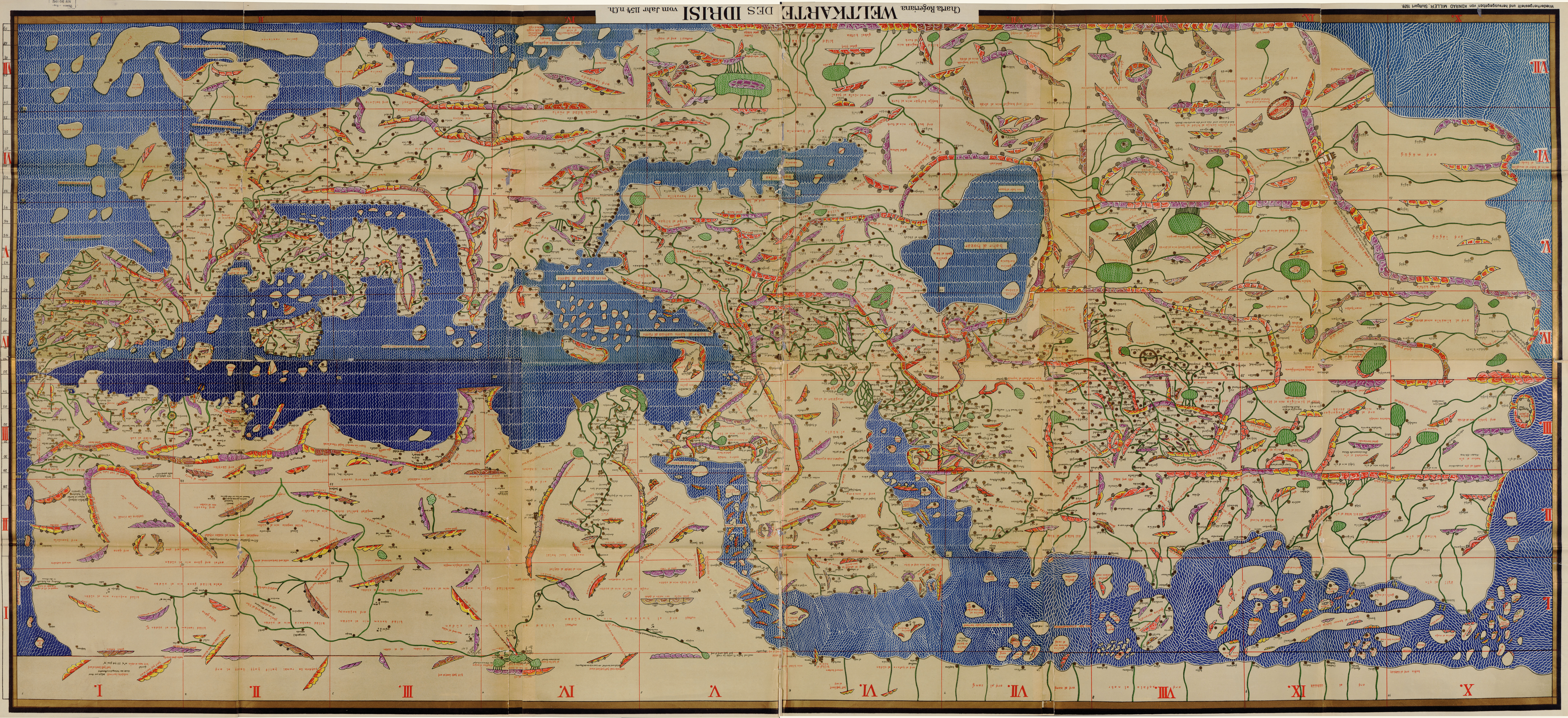
The Tabula Rogeriana, drawn by Al-Idrisi of Sicily in 1154, one of the most advanced ancient world maps. Al-Idrisi also wrote about the diverse Muslim communities found in various lands. Note: The map is here shown upside-down from the original to match current North/Up, South/Down map design.

The history of the Islamic faith as a religion and social institution begins with its inception around 610 CE, when the Islamic prophet Muhammad, a native of Mecca, is believed by Muslims to have received the first revelation of the Quran, and began to preach his message. In 622 CE, facing opposition in Mecca, he and his followers migrated to Yathrib (now Medina), where he was invited to establish a new constitution for the city under his leadership. This migration, called the Hijra, marks the first year of the Islamic calendar. By the time of his death, Muhammad had become the political and spiritual leader of Medina, Mecca, the surrounding region, and numerous other tribes of Arabia.

After Muhammad died in 632, his successors (the Caliphs) continued to lead the Muslim community based on his teachings and guidelines of the Quran. The majority of Muslims consider the first four successors to be 'rightly guided' or Rashidun. The conquests of the Rashidun Caliphate helped to spread Islam beyond the Arabian Peninsula, stretching from northwest India, across Central Asia, the Near East, North Africa, southern Italy, and the Iberian Peninsula, to the Pyrenees. The Arab Muslims were unable to conquer the entire Christian Byzantine Empire in Asia Minor during the Arab–Byzantine wars, however. The succeeding Umayyad Caliphate attempted two failed sieges of Constantinople in 674–678 and 717–718. Meanwhile, the Muslim community tore itself apart into the rivalling Sunni and Shia sects since the killing of caliph Uthman in 656, resulting in a succession crisis that has never been resolved. The following First, Second and Third Fitnas and finally the Abbasid Revolution (746–750) also definitively destroyed the political unity of the Muslims, who have been inhabiting multiple states ever since. Ghaznavids' rule was succeeded by the Ghurid Empire of Muhammad of Ghor and Ghiyath al-Din Muhammad, whose reigns under the leadership of Muhammad Bakhtiyar Khalji extended until the Bengal, where South Asian Islamic missionaries achieved their greatest success in terms of dawah and number of converts to Islam. Qutb ud-Din Aibak conquered Delhi in 1206 and began the reign of the Delhi Sultanate, a successive series of dynasties that synthesized Indian civilization with the wider commercial and cultural networks of Africa and Eurasia, greatly increased demographic and economic growth in India and deterred Mongol incursion into the prosperous Indo-Gangetic Plain and enthroned one of the few female Muslim rulers, Razia Sultana. Notable major empires dominated by Muslims, such as those of the Abbasids, Fatimids, Almoravids, Gao Empire, Seljukids, largest contiguous Songhai Empire (15th-16th centuries) of Sahel, West Africa, southern North Africa and western Central Africa which dominated the centers of Islamic knowledge of Timbuktu, Djenne, Oualata and Gao, Ajuran, Adal and Warsangali in Somalia, Mughals in the Indian subcontinent (India, Bangladesh, Pakistan, etc.), Safavids in Persia and Ottomans in Anatolia, Massina Empire, Sokoto Caliphate of northern Nigeria, Toucouleur Empire, were among the influential and distinguished powers in the world. 19th-century colonialism and 20th-century decolonisation have resulted in several independent Muslim-majority states around the world, with vastly differing attitudes towards and political influences granted to, or restricted for, Islam from country to country. These have revolved around the question of Islam's compatibility with other ideological concepts such as secularism, nationalism (especially Arab nationalism and Pan-Arabism, as opposed to Pan-Islamism), socialism (see also Arab socialism and socialism in Iran), democracy (see Islamic democracy), republicanism (see also Islamic republic), liberalism and progressivism, feminism, capitalism and more.

=== Gunpowder empires ===
Scholars often use the term Age of the Islamic Gunpowders to describe period the Safavid, Ottoman and Mughal states. Each of these three empires had considerable military exploits using the newly developed firearms, especially cannon and small arms, to create their empires. They existed primarily between the fourteenth and the late seventeenth centuries. During the 17th–18th centuries, when the Indian subcontinent was ruled by Mughal Empire's sixth ruler Muhammad Auranzgeb through sharia and Islamic economics, India became the world's largest economy, valued 25% of world GDP.

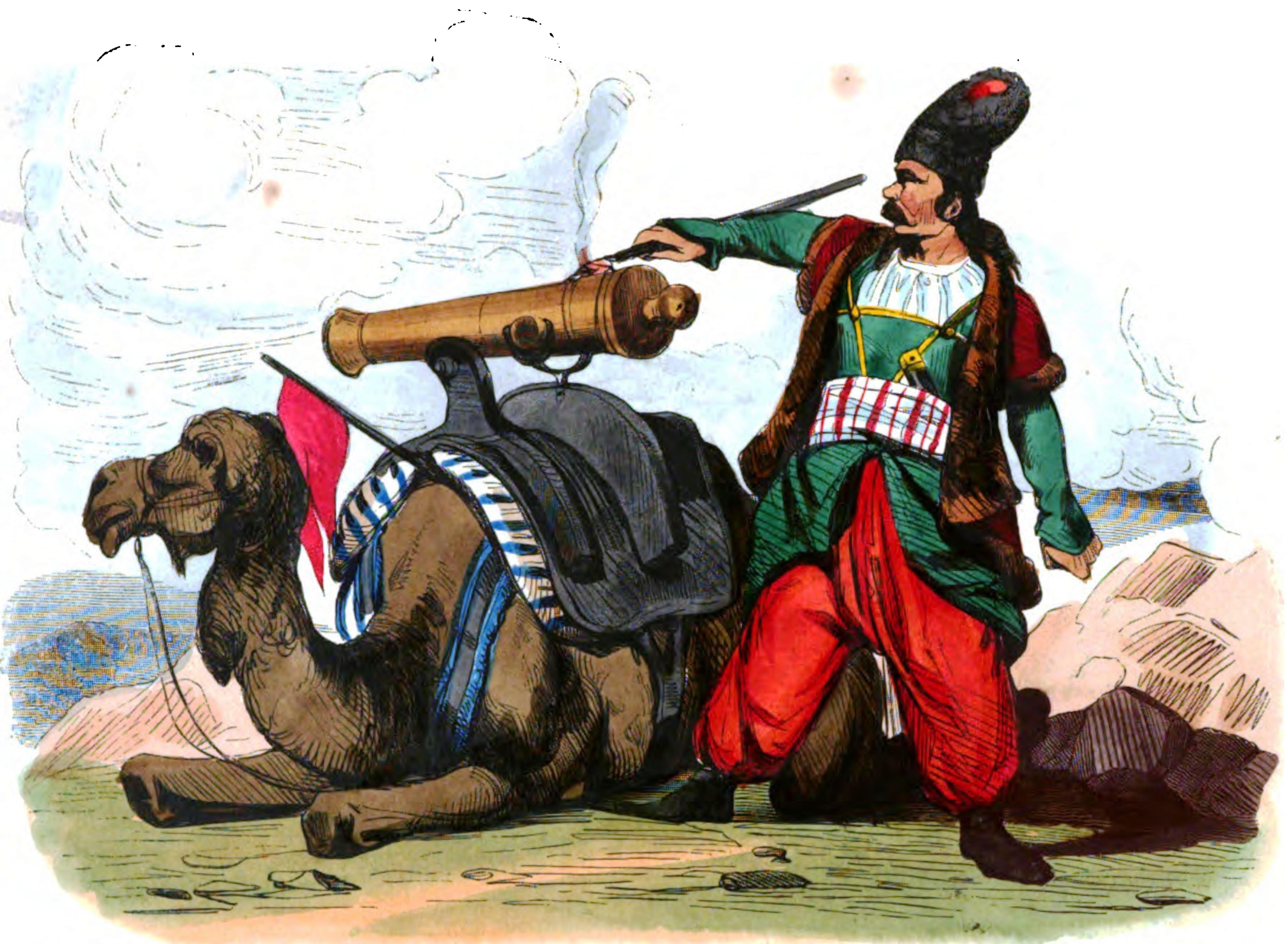
Safavid Empire's Zamburak

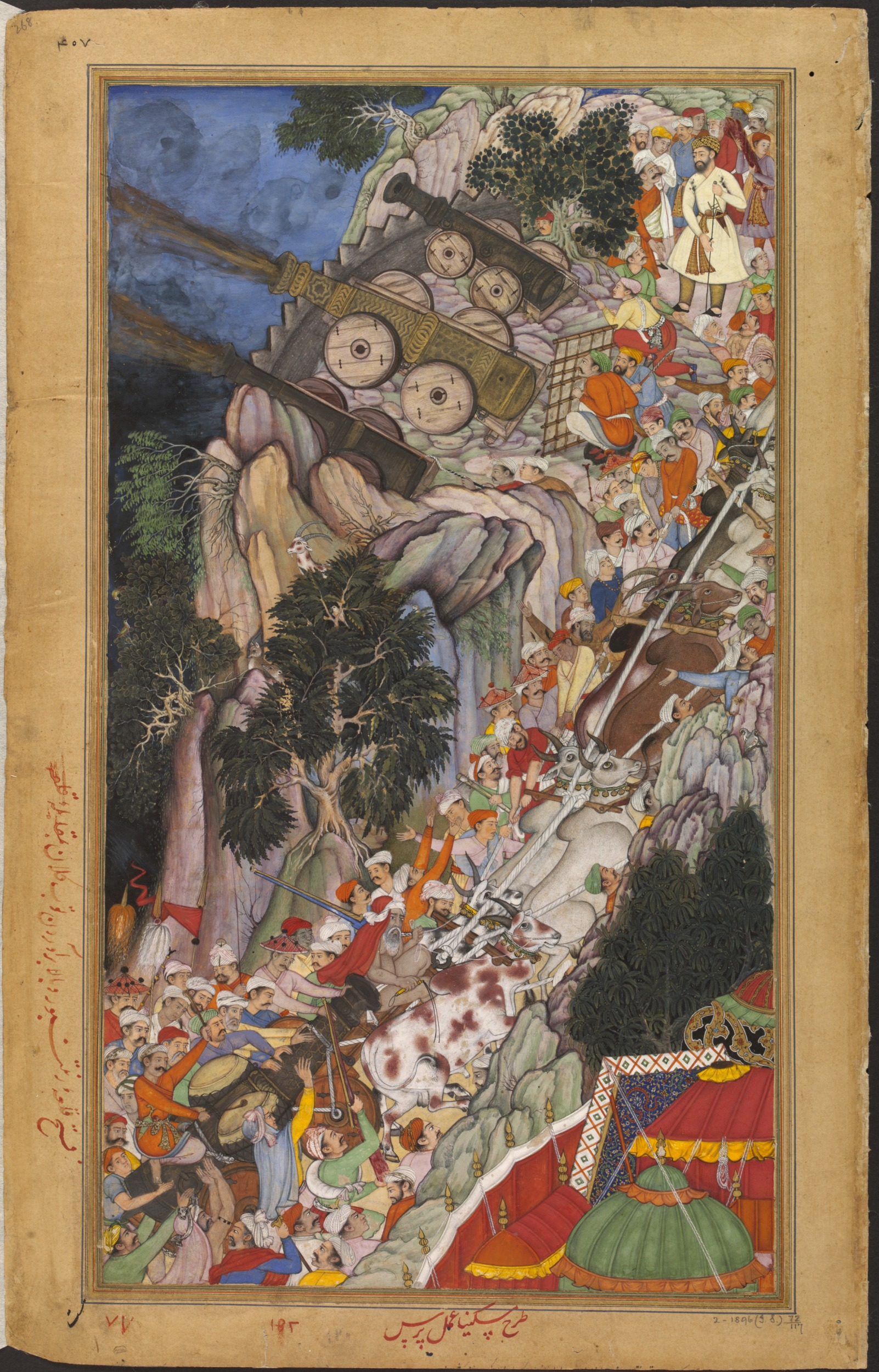
Bullocks dragging siege-guns up hill during Mughal Emperor Akbar's Siege of Ranthambore Fort in 1568.

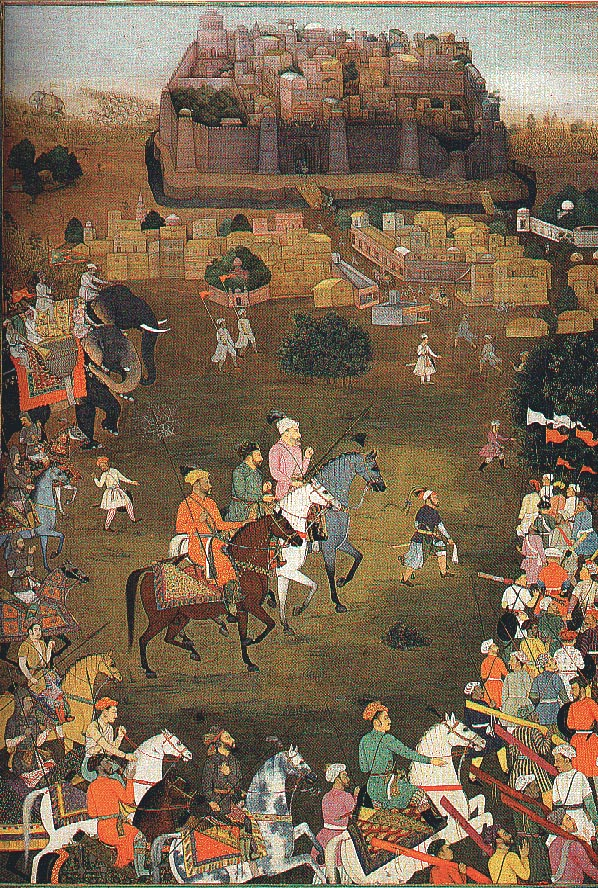
The Mughal Army under the command of Islamist Aurangzeb recaptures Orchha in October 1635.

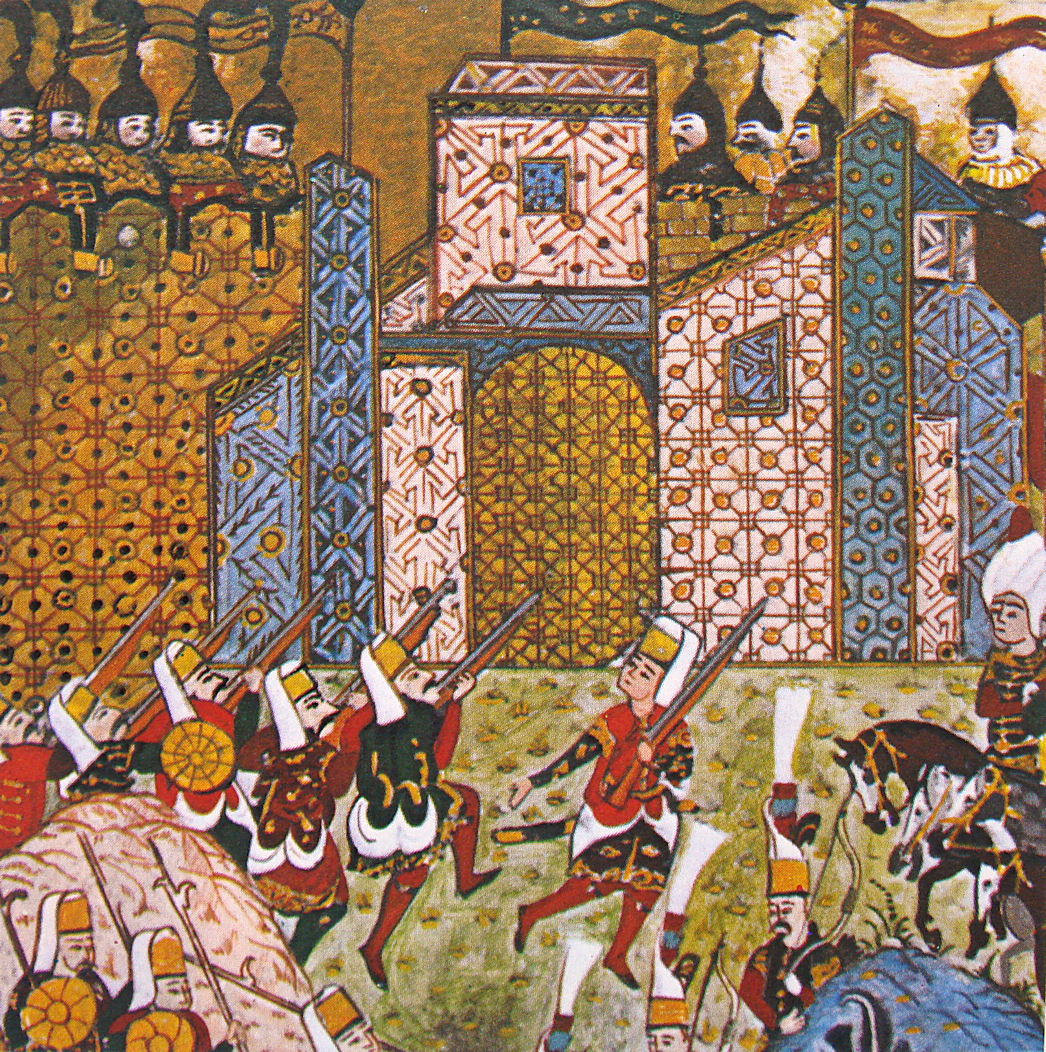
Gun-wielding Ottoman Janissaries in combat against the Knights of Saint John at the Siege of Rhodes in 1522

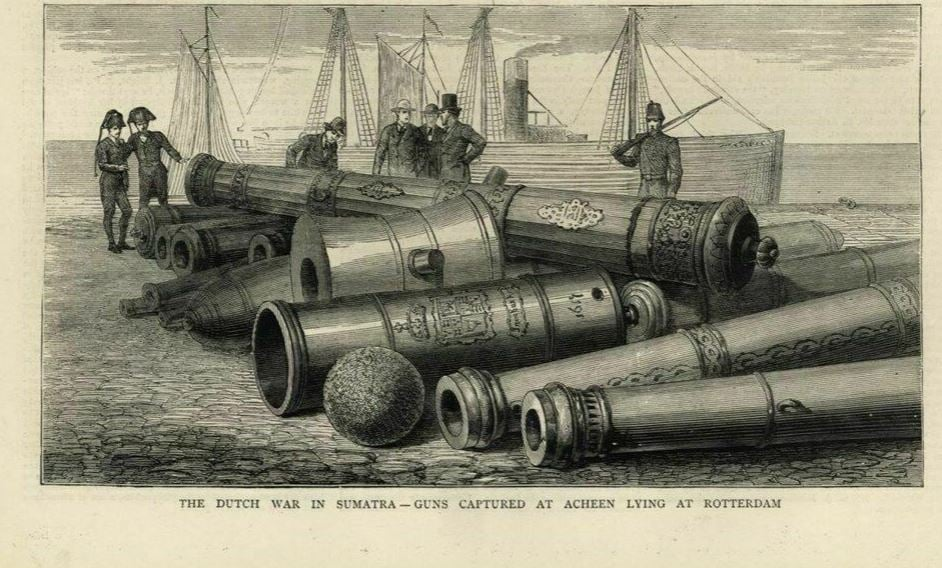
Cannons and guns belonging to the Aceh Sultanate (in modern Indonesia)

=== Great Divergence ===
"Why do the Christian nations, which were so weak in the past compared with Muslim nations begin to dominate so many lands in modern times and even defeat the once victorious Ottoman armies?"..."Because they have laws and rules invented by reason."

— Ibrahim Muteferrika, Rational basis for the Politics of Nations (1731)

The Great Divergence was the reason why European colonial powers militarily defeated preexisting Oriental powers like the Mughal Empire, starting from the wealthy Bengal Subah, Tipu Sultan's Kingdom of Mysore, the Ottoman Empire and many smaller states in the pre-modern Greater Middle East, and initiated a period known as 'colonialism'.

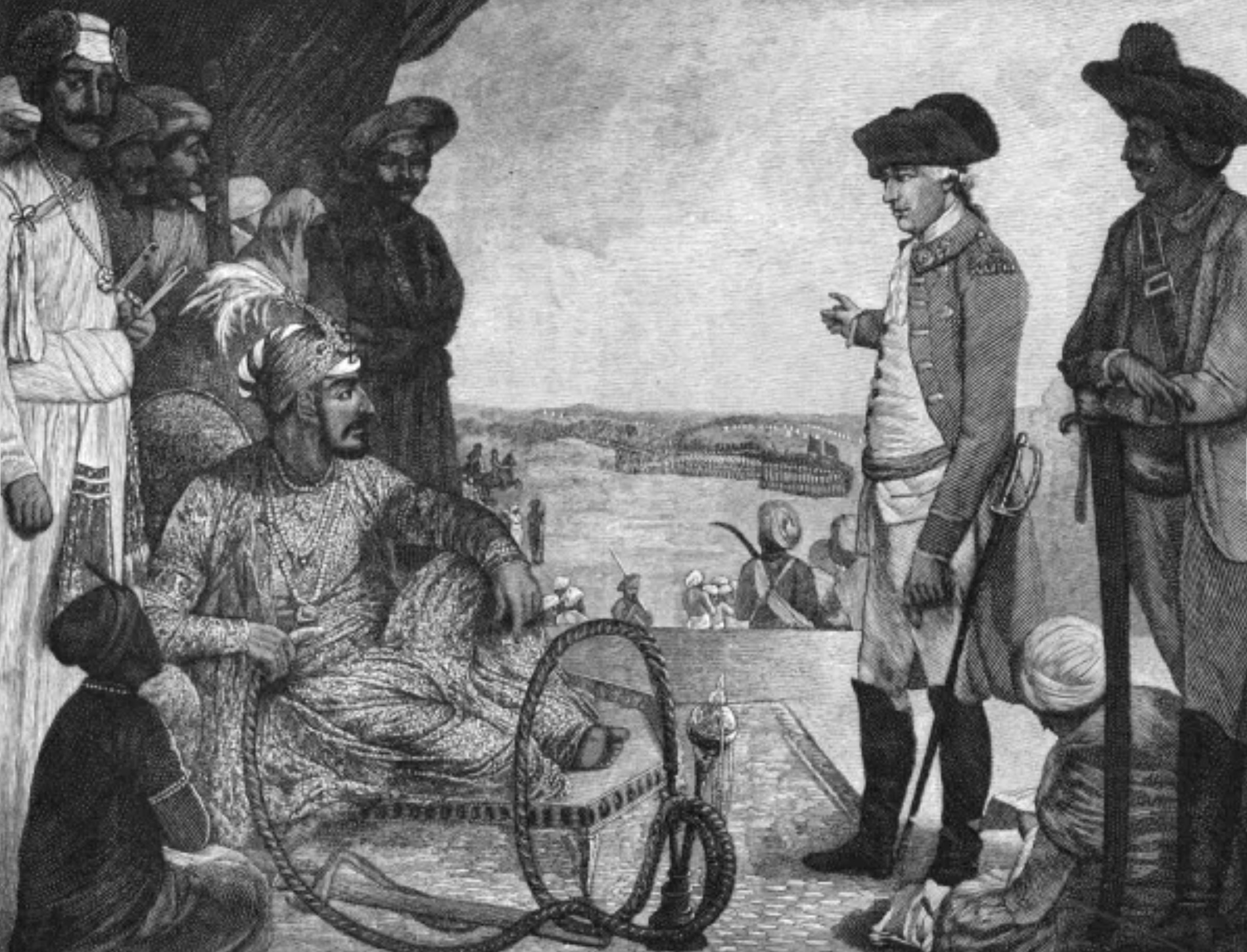
1894 illustration of Shah Alam II reviewing the British East India Company's troops in 1781

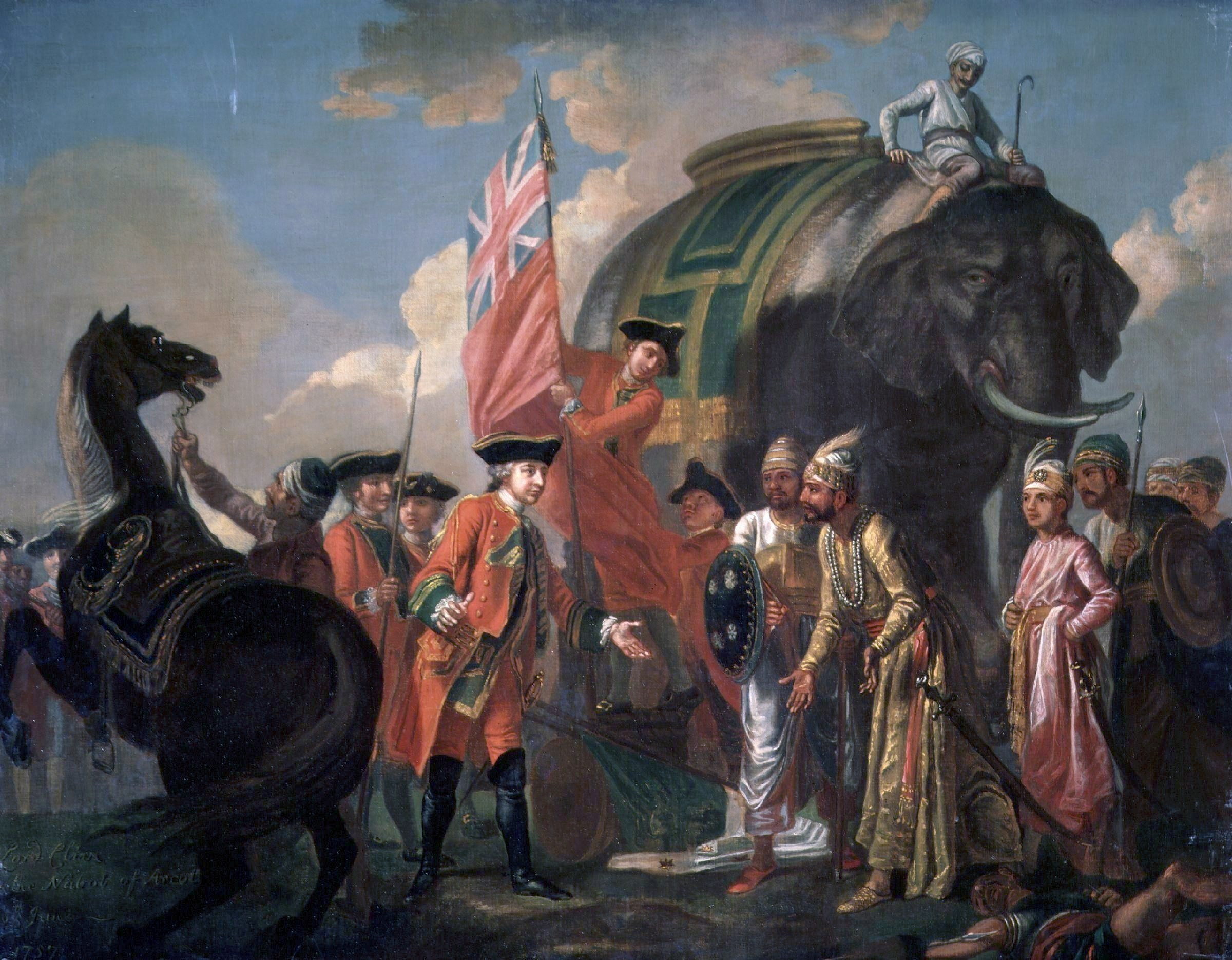
East India Company's Robert Clive meeting the Nawabs of Bengal before the Battle of Plassey.

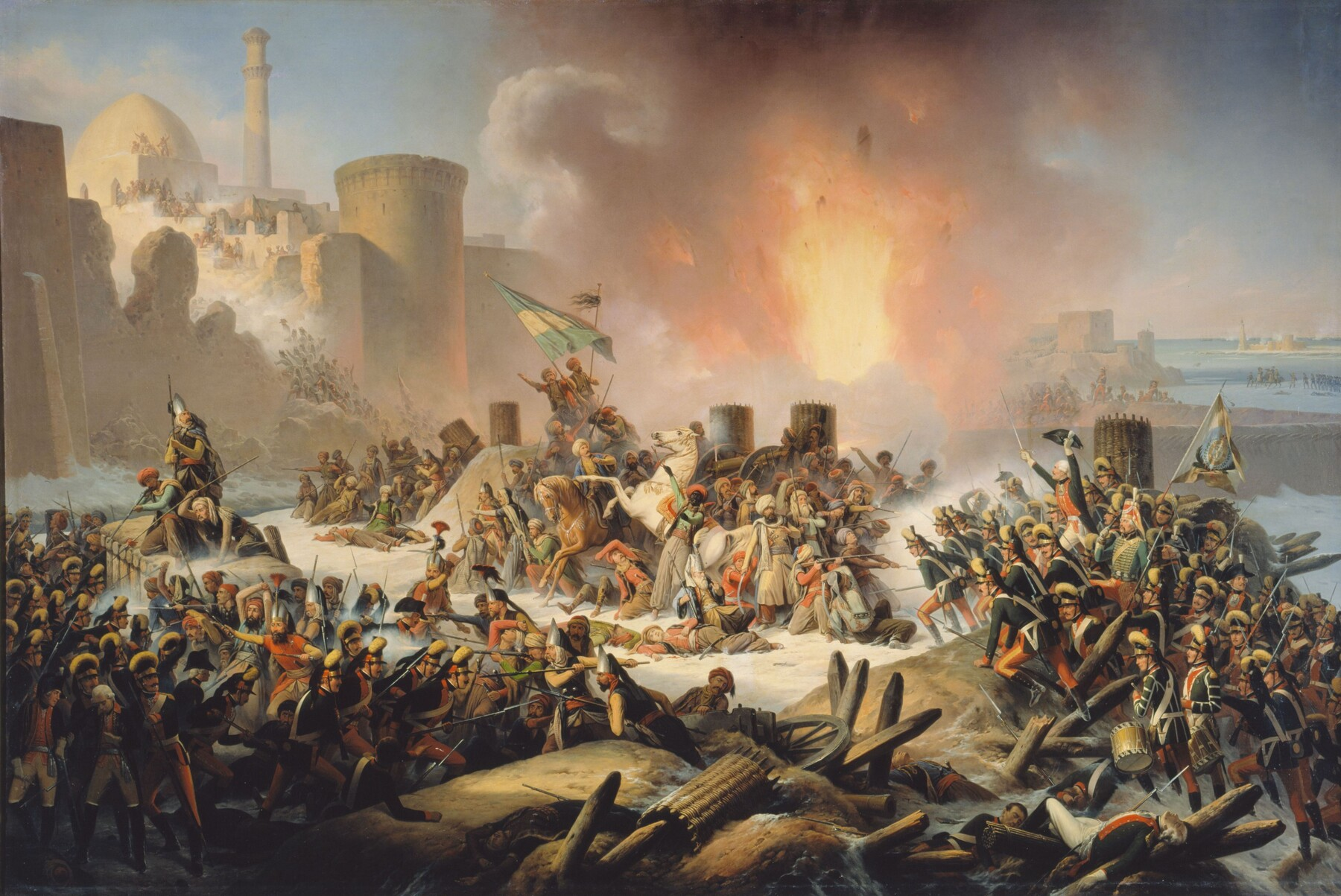
Siege of Ochakov (1788), an armed conflict between the Ottomans and the Russian Tsardom

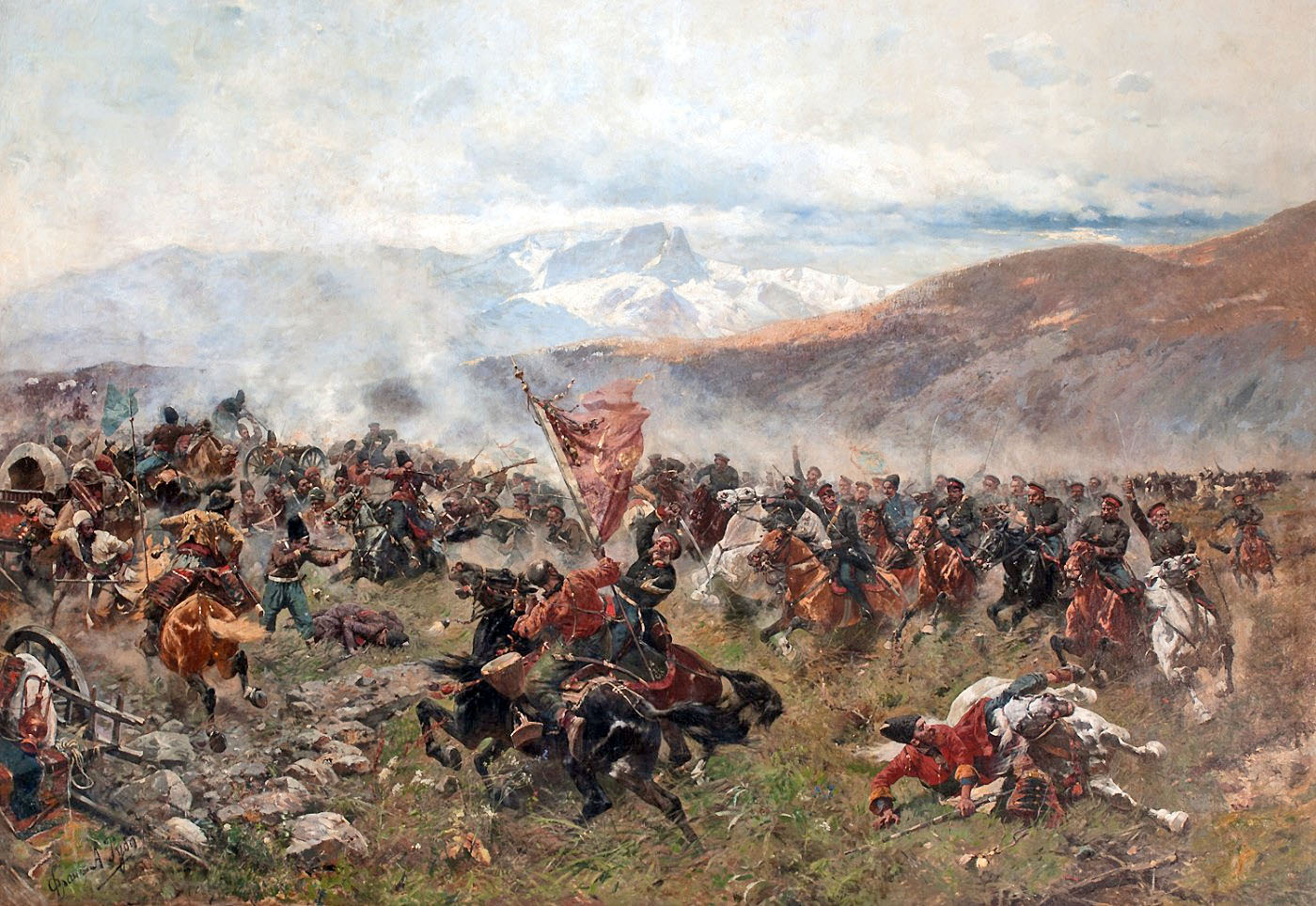
Combat during the Russo-Persian Wars

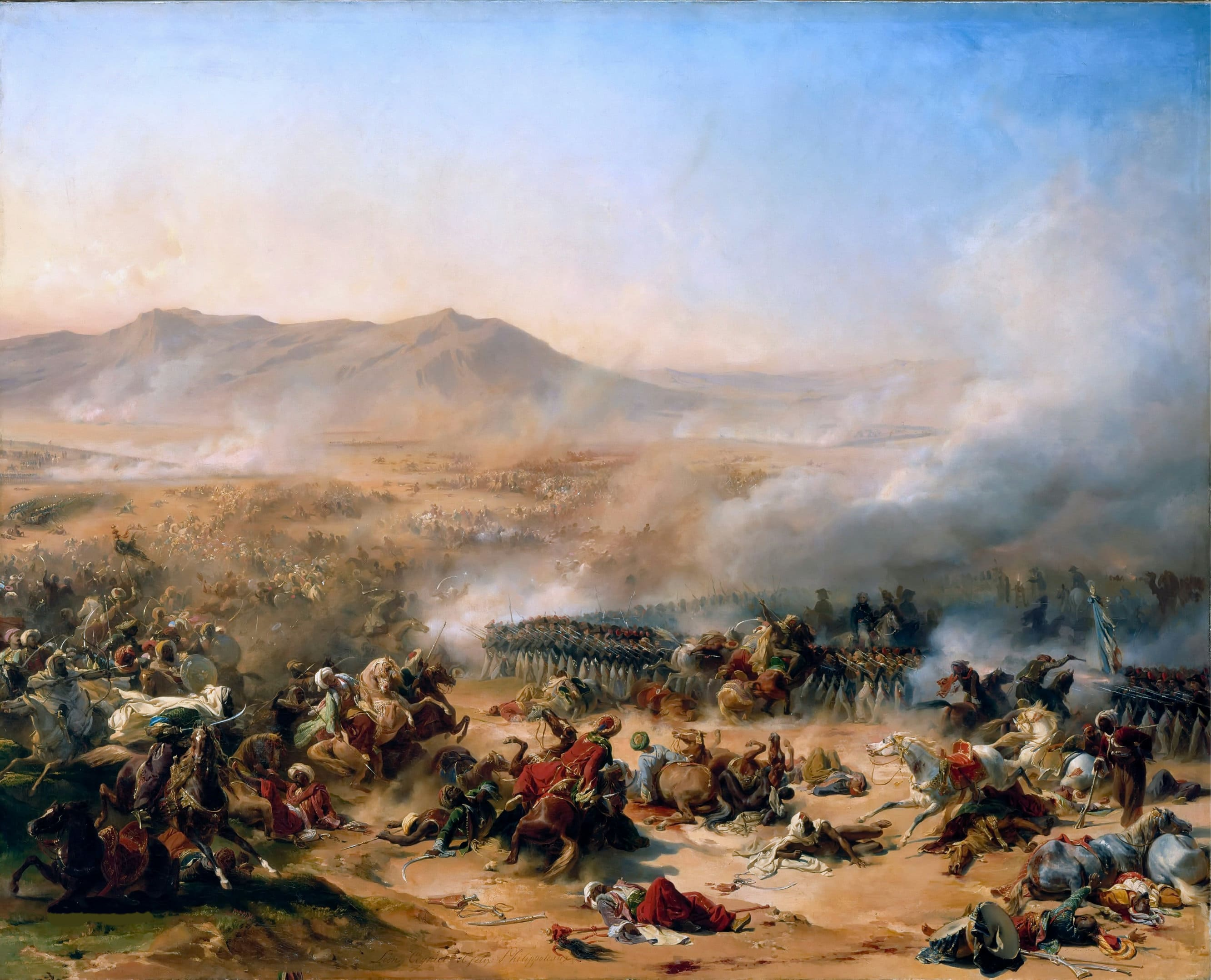
French campaign in Egypt and Syria against the Mamluks and Ottomans

=== Colonialism ===
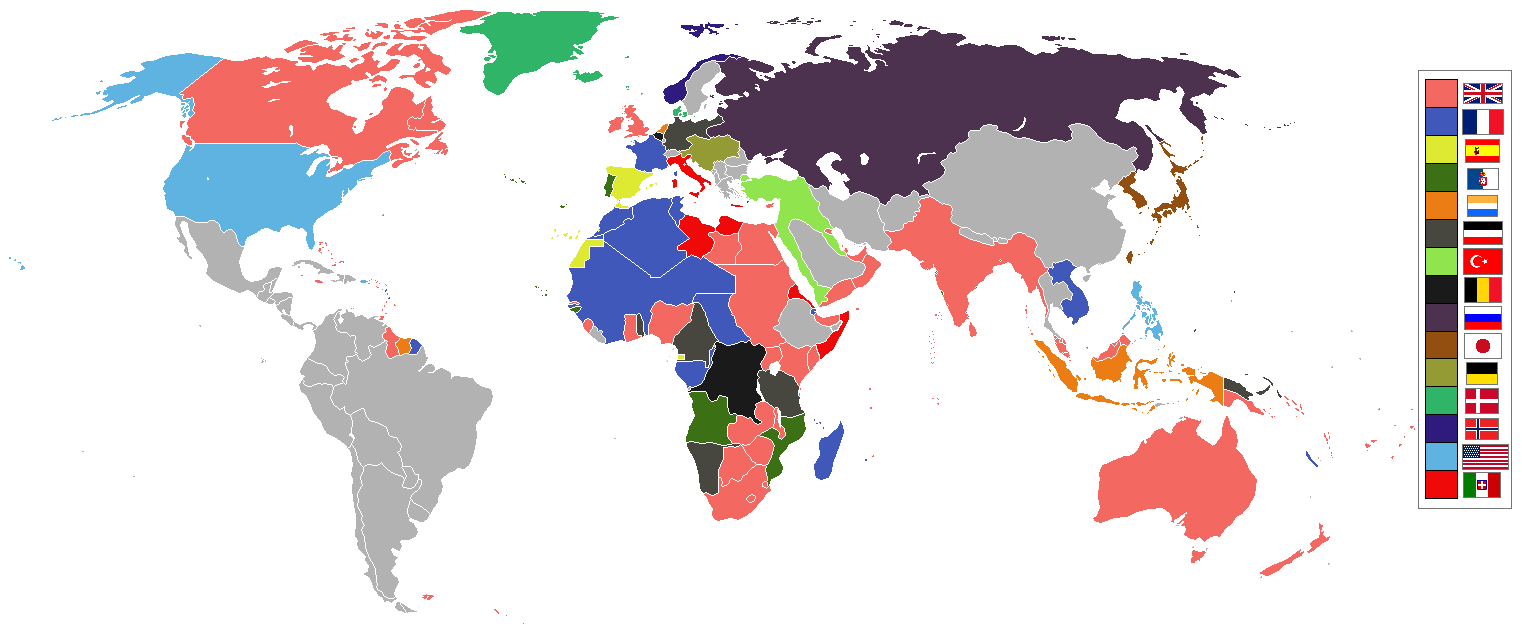
Map of colonial powers throughout the world in the year 1914 (Note colonial powers in the pre-modern Muslim world.)

Beginning with the 15th century, colonialism by European powers profoundly affected Muslim-majority societies in Africa, Europe, the Middle East and Asia. Colonialism was often advanced by conflict with mercantile initiatives by colonial powers and caused tremendous social upheavals in Muslim-dominated societies.

A number of Muslim-majority societies reacted to Western powers with zealotry and thus initiating the rise of Pan-Islamism; or affirmed more traditionalist and inclusive cultural ideals; and in rare cases adopted modernity that was ushered by the colonial powers.

The only Muslim-majority regions not to be colonized by the Europeans were Saudi Arabia, Iran, Turkey, and Afghanistan. Turkey was one of the first colonial powers of the world with the Ottoman empire ruling several states for over 6 centuries.

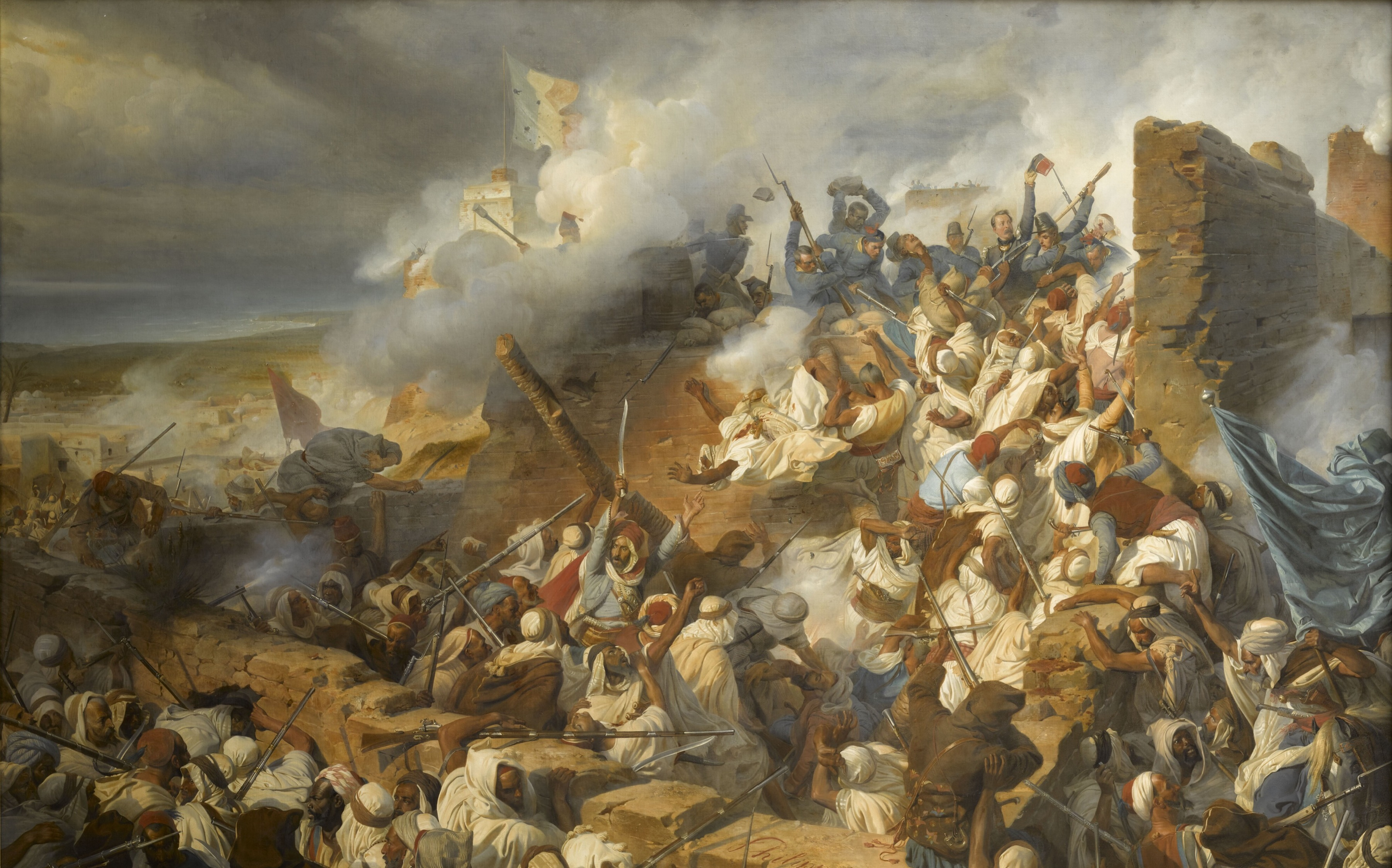
The French conquest of Algeria, from 1830 to 1903

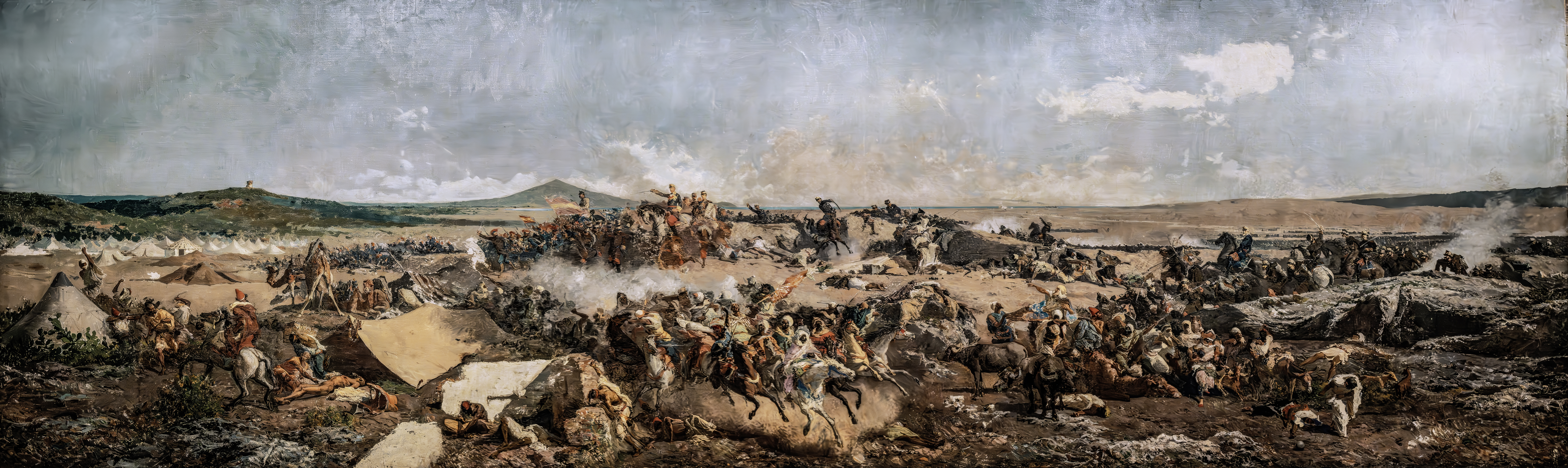
The Hispano-Moroccan War between Spain and Morocco, from 1859 to 1860

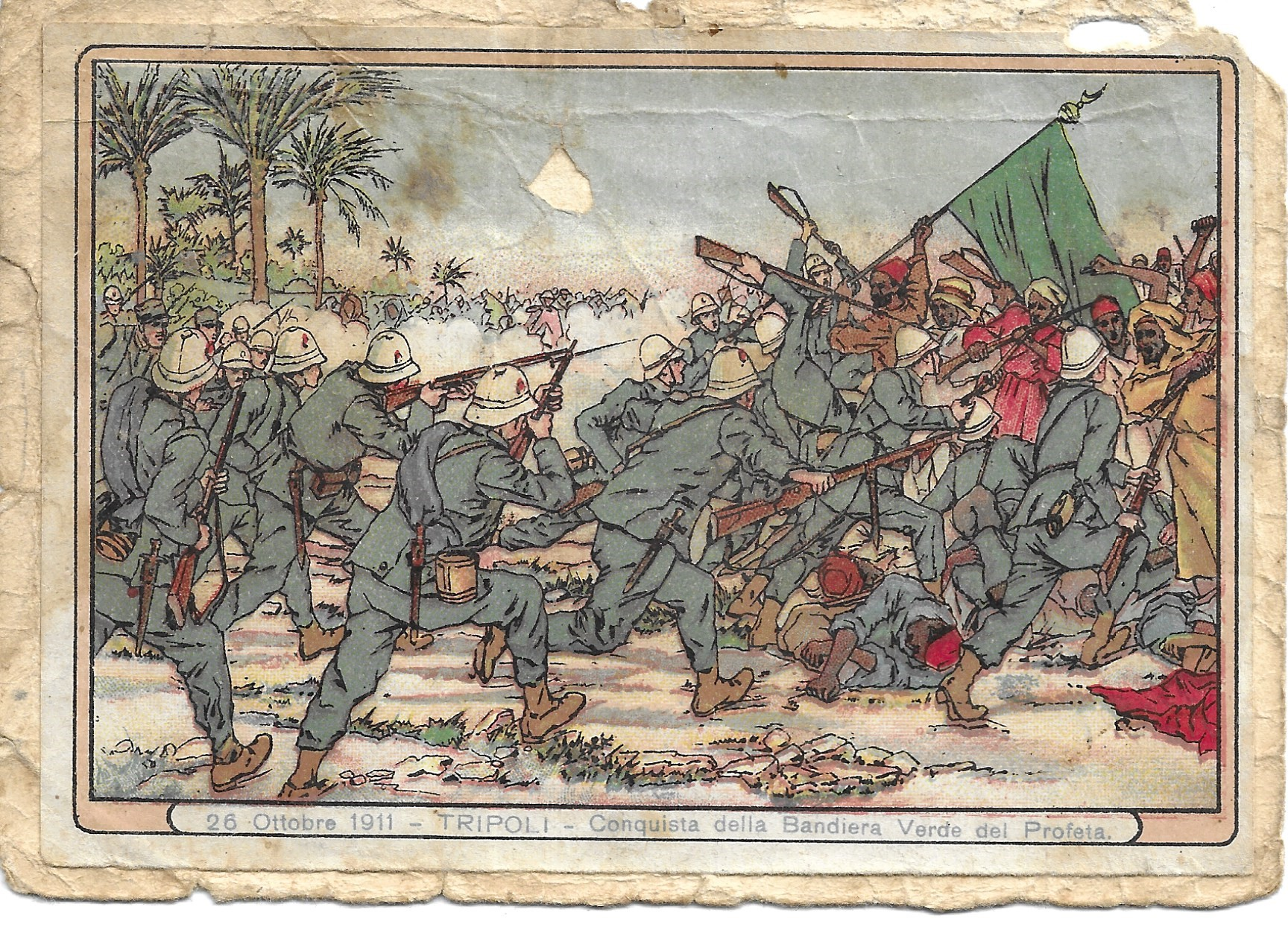
The Italo-Turkish War between Italy and the Ottoman Empire from 1911 to 1912

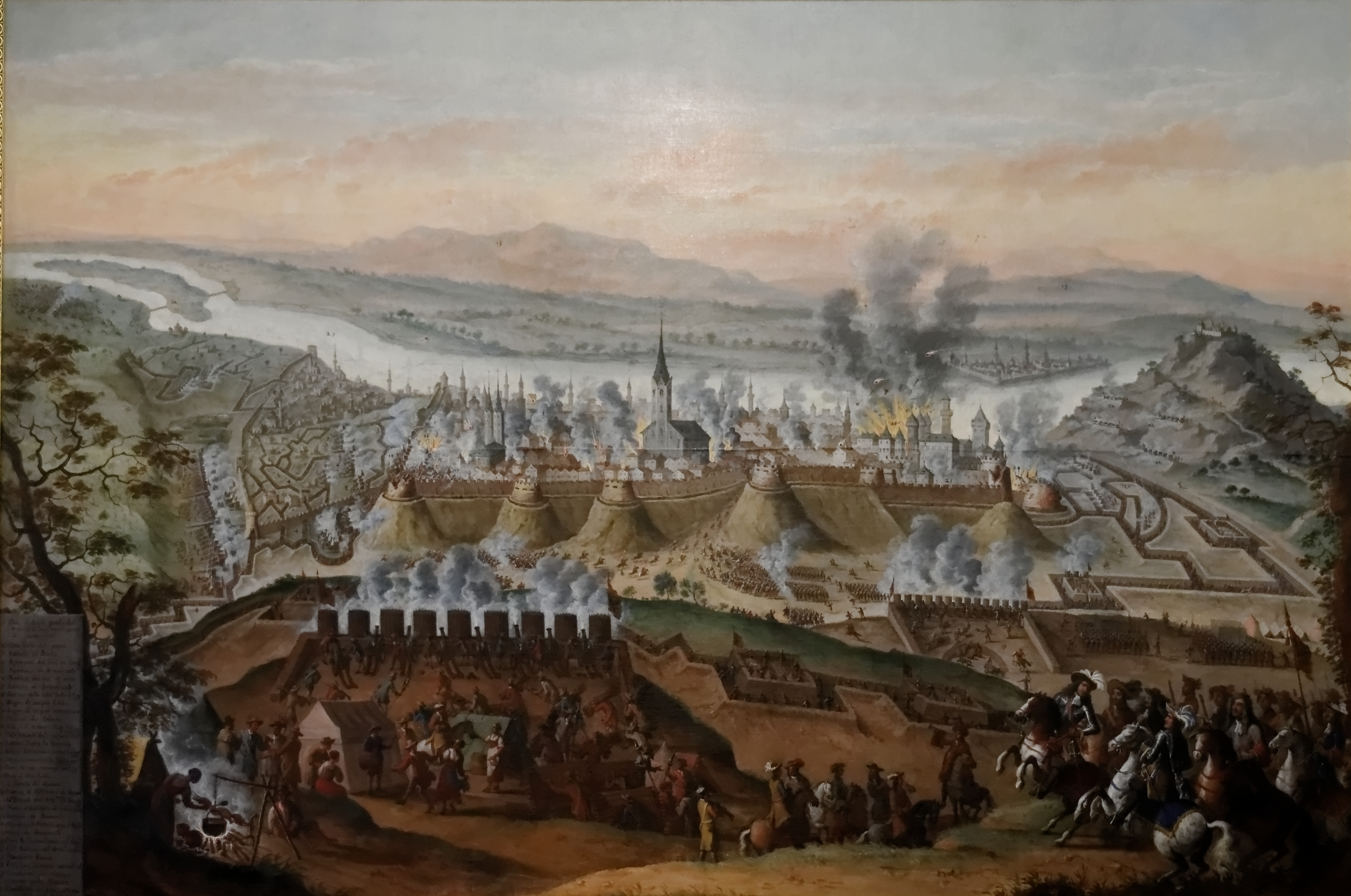
The Christian reconquest of Buda, Ottoman Hungary, 1686, painted by Frans Geffels

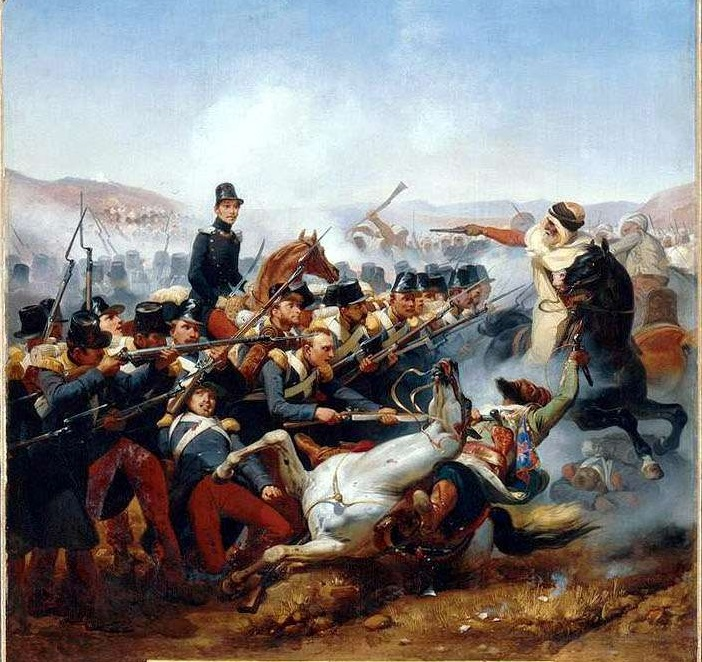
French conquest of Algeria (1830–1857)

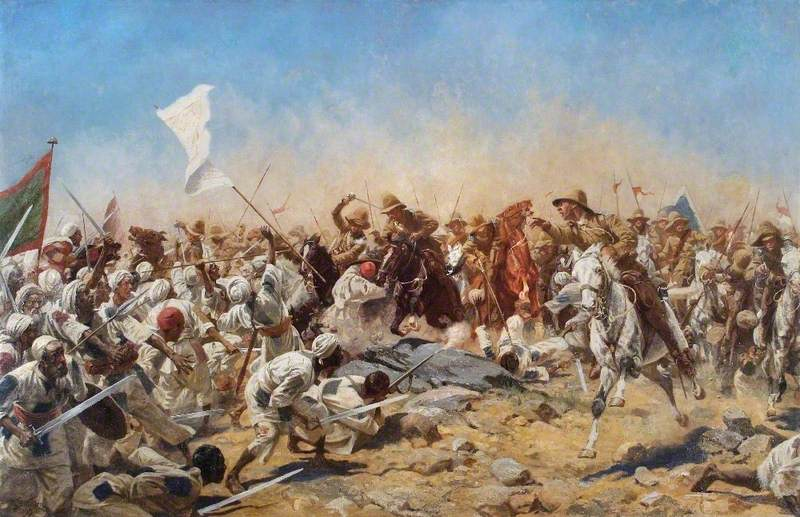
Anglo-Egyptian invasion of Sudan 1896–1899

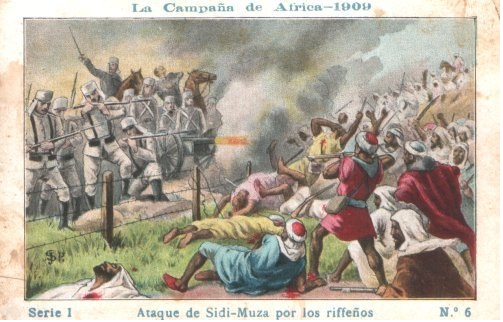
The Melilla War between Spain and Rif Berbers of Morocco in 1909

=== Postcolonial era ===
In the 20th century, the end of the European colonial domination has led to creation of a number of nation states with significant Muslim populations. These states drew on Islamic traditions to varying degree and in various ways in organizing their legal, educational and economic systems. The Times first documented the term "Muslim world" in 1912 when describing Pan-Islamism as a movement with power importance and cohesion born in Paris where Turks, Arabs and Persians congregated. The article considered The position of the Amir; the effect of the Tripoli Campaign; Anglo-Russian action in Persia; and "Afghan Ambitions".

A significant change in the Muslim world was the defeat and dissolution of the Ottoman Empire (1908–1922), to which the Ottoman officer and Turkish revolutionary statesman Mustafa Kemal Atatürk had an instrumental role in ending and replacing it with the Republic of Turkey, a modern, secular democracy (see Abolition of the Ottoman sultanate in 1922, abolition of the Caliphate in 1924). The secular values of Kemalist Turkey separated religion from the state.

In the 21st century, after the September 11 attacks (2001) coordinated by the Wahhabi Islamist terrorist group Al-Qaeda against the United States, scholars considered the ramifications of seeking to understand Muslim experience through the framework of secular Enlightenment principles. Muhammad Atta, one of the 11 September hijackers, reportedly quoted from the Quran to allay his fears: "Fight them, and God will chastise them at your hands/And degrade them, and He will help you/Against them, and bring healing to the breasts of a people who believe", referring to the ummah, the community of Muslim believers, and invoking the imagery of the early warriors of Islam who lead the faithful from the darkness of jahiliyyah.

By Sayyid Qutb's definition of Islam, the faith is "a complete divorce from jahiliyyah". He complained that American churches served as centers of community social life that were "very hard [to] distinguish from places of fun and amusement". For Qutb, Western society was the modern jahliliyyah. His understanding of the "Muslim world" and its "social order" was that, presented to the Western world as the result of practicing Islamic teachings, would impress "by the beauty and charm of true Islamic ideology". He argued that the values of the Enlightenment and its related precursor, the Scientific Revolution, "denies or suspends God's sovereignty on earth" and argued that strengthening "Islamic character" was needed "to abolish the negative influences of jahili life."

== Islam by country ==
As the Muslim world came into contact with secular ideals, societies responded in different ways. Some Muslim-majority countries are secular. Azerbaijan became the first secular republic in the Muslim world, between 1918 and 1920, before it was incorporated into the Soviet Union. Turkey has been governed as a secular state since the reforms of Mustafa Kemal Atatürk. By contrast, the 1979 Iranian Revolution replaced a monarchial semi-secular regime with an Islamic republic led by the Ayatollah, Ruhollah Khomeini.

Some countries have declared Islam as the official state religion. In those countries, the legal code is largely secular. Only personal status matters pertaining to inheritance and marriage are governed by Sharia law. In some places, Muslims implement Islamic law, called sharia in Arabic. The Islamic law exists in a number of variations, called schools of jurisprudence. The Amman Message, which was endorsed in 2005 by prominent Islamic scholars around the world, recognized four Sunni schools (Hanafi, Maliki, Shafi'i, Hanbali), two Shia schools (Ja'fari, Zaidi), the Ibadi school, and the Zahiri school.

=== Government and religion (50) ===
==== Islamic states (8) ====
Eight Islamic states have adopted Islam as the ideological foundation of state and constitution.

- Afghanistan
- Brunei
- Iran
- Mauritania
- Oman
- Pakistan
- Saudi Arabia
- Yemen

==== State religion (17) ====
The following seventeen Muslim-majority states have endorsed Islam as their state religion, and though they may guarantee freedom of religion for citizens, do not declare a separation of state and religion:

- Algeria
- Bahrain
- Bangladesh
- Comoros
- Djibouti
- Egypt
- Iraq
- Jordan
- Kuwait
- Libya
- Malaysia
- Maldives
- Morocco
- Palestine
- Qatar
- Somalia
- United Arab Emirates

==== Secular states (25) ====
Twenty-five secular states in the Muslim world have declared separation between civil/government affairs and religion.

- Albania
- Azerbaijan
- Bosnia and Herzegovina
- Burkina Faso
- Chad
- Gambia
- Guinea
- Guinea-Bissau
- Indonesia
- Kazakhstan
- Kosovo
- Kyrgyzstan
- Lebanon
- Mali
- Niger
- Nigeria
- Senegal
- Sierra Leone
- Sudan
- Syria
- Tajikistan
- Tunisia
- Turkey
- Turkmenistan
- Uzbekistan

==== Muslim-minority states (8) ====
According to the Pew Research Center in 2015 there were 50 Muslim-majority countries, which are shown in the Government and religion section above in the article. Apart from these, large Muslim populations exist in some countries where Muslims are a minority, and their Muslim communities are larger than many Muslim-majority nations:

- India: 200 million Muslims (14.6%)
- Ethiopia: 34.7 million Muslims (31.3%)
- China: 25–40 million Muslims (2–3%)
- Tanzania: 19.4 million Muslims (35.2%)
- Russia: 14–20 million Muslims (10–14%)
- Ivory Coast: 12 million Muslims (42%)
- DR Congo: 10 million Muslims (15%)
- Philippines: 8–9 million Muslims (9–10%)

=== Politics ===
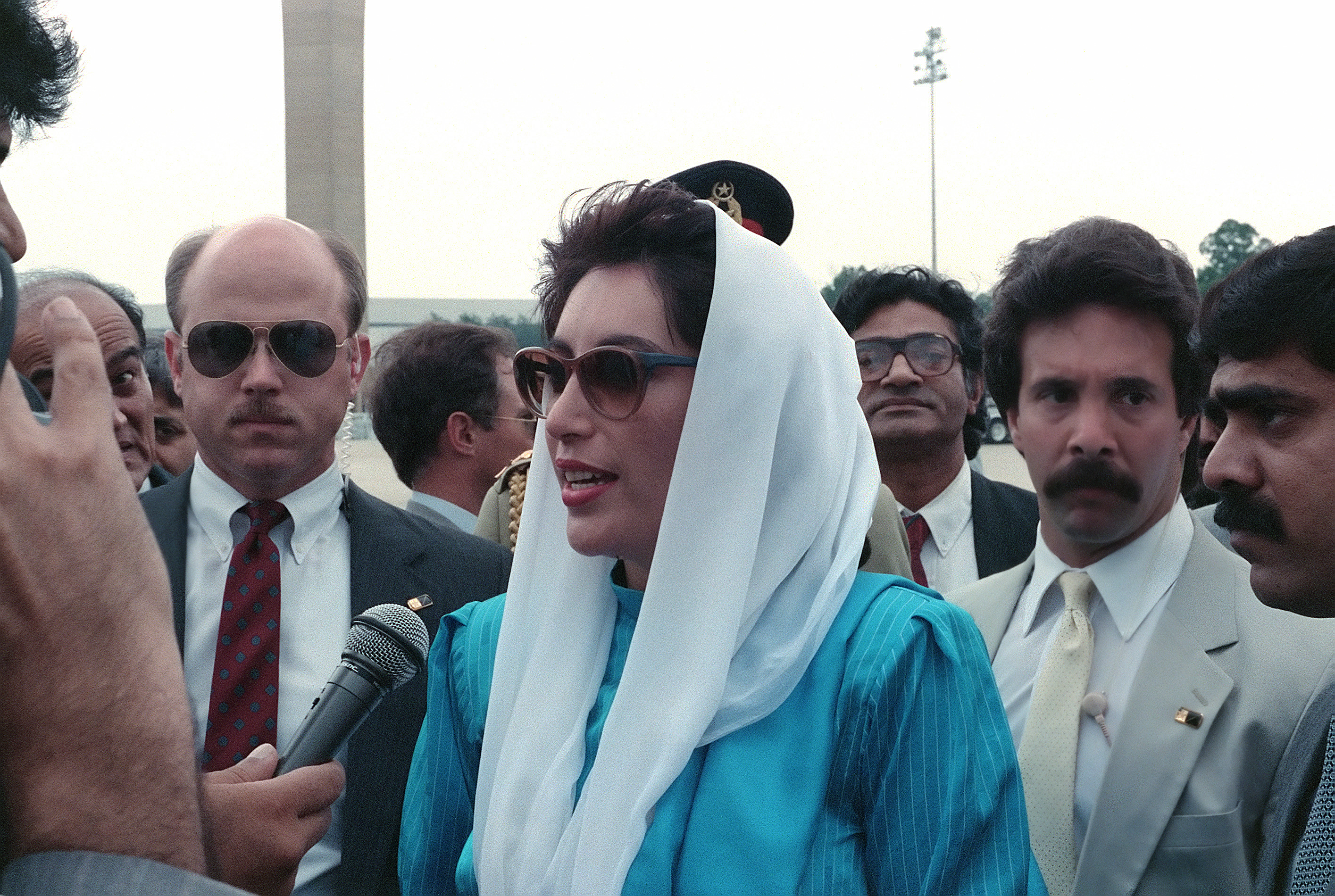
Benazir Bhutto, the former prime minister of Pakistan became the first woman elected to lead a Muslim-majority country.

During much of the 20th century, the Islamic identity and the dominance of Islam on political issues have arguably increased during the early 21st century. The fast-growing interests of the Western world in Islamic regions, international conflicts and globalization have changed the influence of Islam on the world in contemporary history.

==== Islamism ====
Islamism is a range of religious and political ideological movements that believe that Islam should influence political systems. Its proponents believe Islam is innately political, and that Islam as a political system is superior to communism, liberal democracy, capitalism, and other alternatives in achieving a just, successful society. The advocates of Islamism are usually affiliated with Islamic institutions or social mobilization movements, emphasizing the implementation of sharia, pan-Islamic political unity, and the creation of Islamic states.

In its original formulation, Islamism described an ideology seeking to revive Islam to its past assertiveness and glory, purifying it of foreign elements, reasserting its role into "social and political as well as personal life"; and in particular "reordering government and society in accordance with laws prescribed by Islam" (i.e., Sharia). According to at least one observer (author Robin Wright), Islamist movements have "arguably altered the Middle East more than any trend since the modern states gained independence", redefining "politics and even borders". Another sole author (Graham E. Fuller) has argued for a broader notion of Islamism as a form of identity politics, involving "support for [Muslim] identity, authenticity, broader regionalism, revivalism, [and] revitalization of the community".

Central and prominent figures in 20th-century Islamism include Rashid Rida, Hassan al-Banna (founder of the Muslim Brotherhood), Sayyid Qutb, Abul A'la Maududi, Ruhollah Khomeini (founder of the Islamic Republic of Iran), and Hassan Al-Turabi. Syrian Sunni cleric Muhammad Rashid Riḍā, a fervent opponent of Westernization, Zionism and nationalism, advocated Sunni internationalism through revolutionary restoration of a pan-Islamic Caliphate to politically unite the Muslim world. Riḍā was a strong exponent of Islamic vanguardism, the belief that the Muslim community should be guided by religious activists to steer the efforts for religious education and Islamic revival. Riḍā's Salafi-Arabist synthesis and Islamist ideals greatly influenced his disciples like Hasan al-Banna, an Egyptian schoolteacher who founded the Muslim Brotherhood movement, and Hajji Amin al-Husayni, the anti-Zionist Grand Mufti of Jerusalem. Al-Banna and Maududi called for a "reformist" strategy to re-Islamizing society through grassroots social and political activism. Other Islamists (Al-Turabi) are proponents of a "revolutionary" strategy of Islamizing society through exercise of state power, or (Sayyid Qutb) for combining grassroots Islamization with armed revolution. The term has been applied to non-state reform movements, political parties, militias and revolutionary groups.

Islamists themselves prefer terms such as "Islamic movement", or "Islamic activism" to "Islamism", objecting to the insinuation that Islamism is anything other than Islam renewed and revived. Because of its connotations in Western mainstream media, critics say the term may lead to Islamophobia and stereotyping.

Prominent Islamist groups and parties across the world include the Muslim Brotherhood, Turkey's Justice and Development Party, Hamas, the Algerian Islamic Salvation Front, the Malaysian National Trust Party, Jamaat-e-Islami in Bangladesh and Pakistan and Bosnia's Party of Democratic Action. Following the Arab Spring, many post-Islamist currents became heavily involved in democratic politics, while others spawned "the most aggressive and ambitious Islamist militia" to date, such as the Islamic State of Iraq and the Levant (ISIL). ISIL has been rejected as blasphemous by the majority of Islamists.

== Demographics ==
More than 24.1% of the world's population is Muslim, with an estimated total of approximately 1.9 billion. Muslims are the majority in 49 countries, they speak hundreds of languages and come from diverse ethnic backgrounds. The city of Karachi has the largest Muslim population in the world.

=== Geography ===
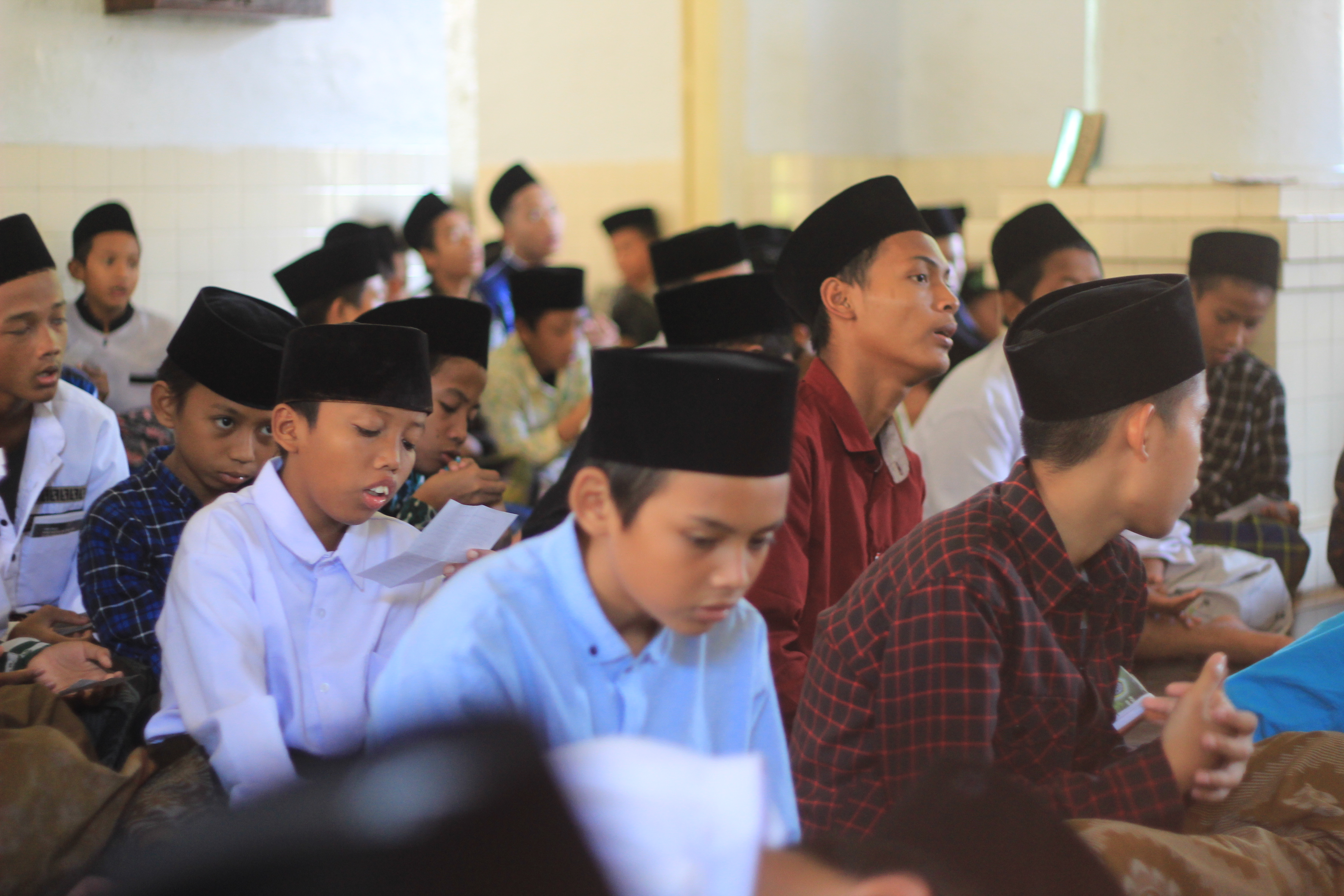
Indonesia is currently the most populous Muslim-majority country.

Because the terms 'Muslim world' and 'Islamic world' are disputed, since no country is homogeneously Muslim, and there is no way to determine at what point a Muslim minority in a country is to be considered 'significant' enough, there is no consensus on how to define the Muslim world geographically. The only rule of thumb for inclusion which has some support, is that countries need to have a Muslim population of more than 50%.

In 2010, 73% of the world's Muslim population lived in countries where Muslims are in the majority, while 27% of the world's Muslim population lived in countries where Muslims are in the minority. India's Muslim population is the world's largest Muslim-minority population in the world (11% of the world's Muslim population). Jones (2005) defines a "large minority" as being between 30% and 50%, which described nine countries in 2000, namely Eritrea, Ethiopia, Guinea-Bissau, Ivory Coast, Nigeria, North Macedonia, and Tanzania. As of 2024, however, Nigeria has become a Muslim-majority country.

=== Religion ===
==== Islam ====
The two main denominations of Islam are the Sunni and Shia sects. They differ primarily upon of how the life of the ummah ("faithful") should be governed, and the role of the imam. Sunnis believe that the true political successor of Muhammad according to the Sunnah should be selected based on ٍShura (consultation), as was done at the Saqifah which selected Abu Bakr, Muhammad's father-in-law, to be Muhammad's political but not his religious successor. Shia, on the other hand, believe that Muhammad designated his son-in-law Ali ibn Abi Talib as his true political as well as religious successor.

The overwhelming majority of Muslims in the world, between 87 and 90%, are Sunni. Shias and other groups make up the rest, about 10–13% of overall Muslim population. The countries with the highest concentration of Shia populations are: Iran – 89%, Azerbaijan – 65%, Iraq – 60%, Bahrain – 60%, Yemen – 35%, Turkey – 10%, Lebanon – 27%, Syria – 13%, Afghanistan – 10%, Pakistan – 10%, and India – 10%.

Non-denominational Muslims make up a majority of the Muslims in seven countries (and a plurality in three others): Albania (65%), Kyrgyzstan (64%), Kosovo (58%), Indonesia (56%), Mali (55%), Bosnia and Herzegovina (54%), Uzbekistan (54%), Azerbaijan (45%), Russia (45%), and Nigeria (42%). They are found primarily in Central Asia. Kazakhstan has the largest number of non-denominational Muslims, who constitute about 74% of the population. Southeastern Europe also has a large number of non-denominational Muslims.

The Kharijite Muslims, who are less known, have their own stronghold in the country of Oman holding about 75% of the population.

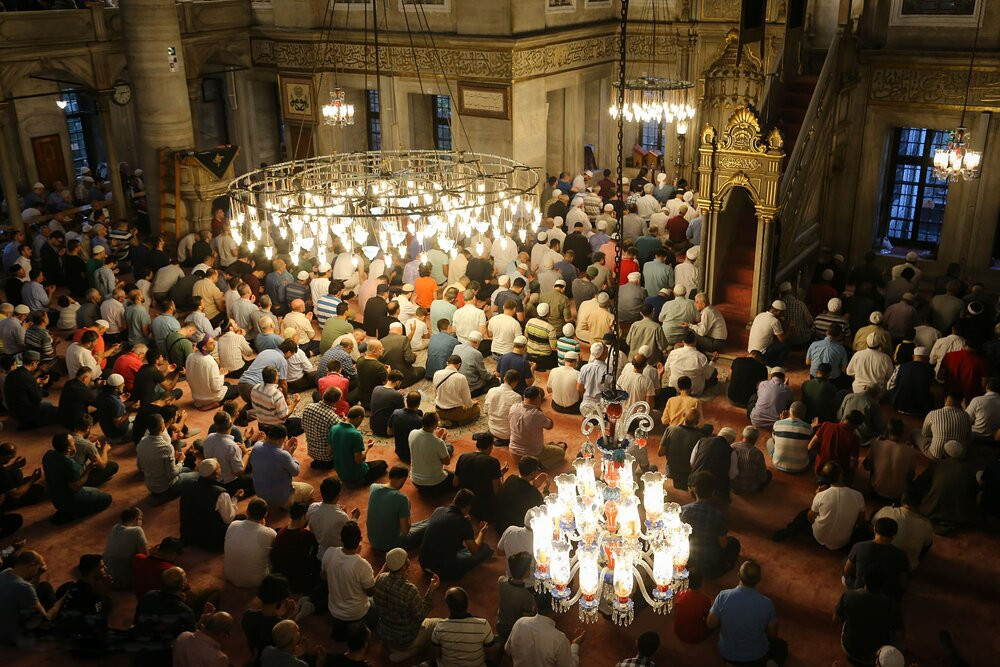
Turkish Muslims at the Eyüp Sultan Mosque on Eid al-Adha

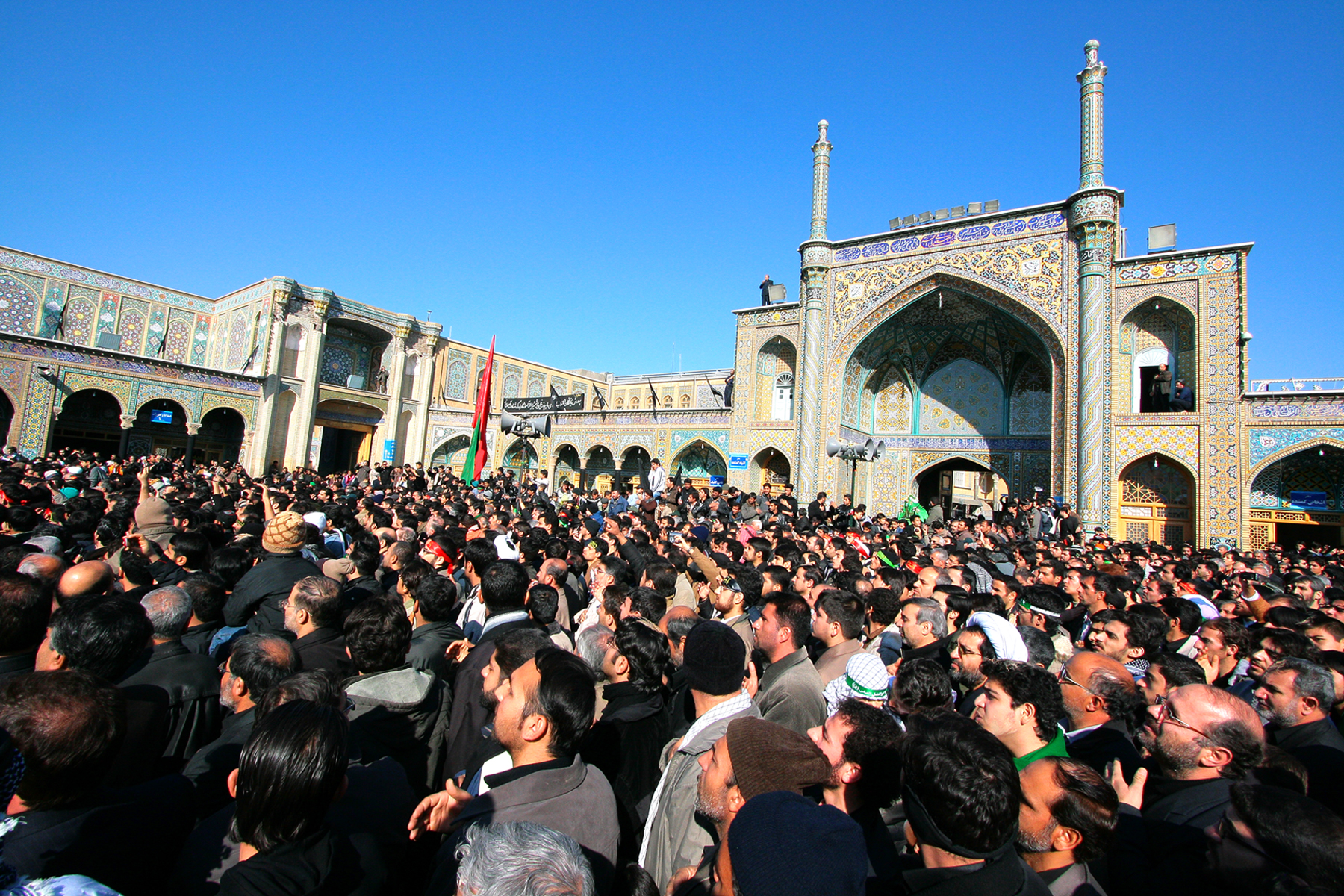
Shi'a Muslims in Iran commemorate Ashura

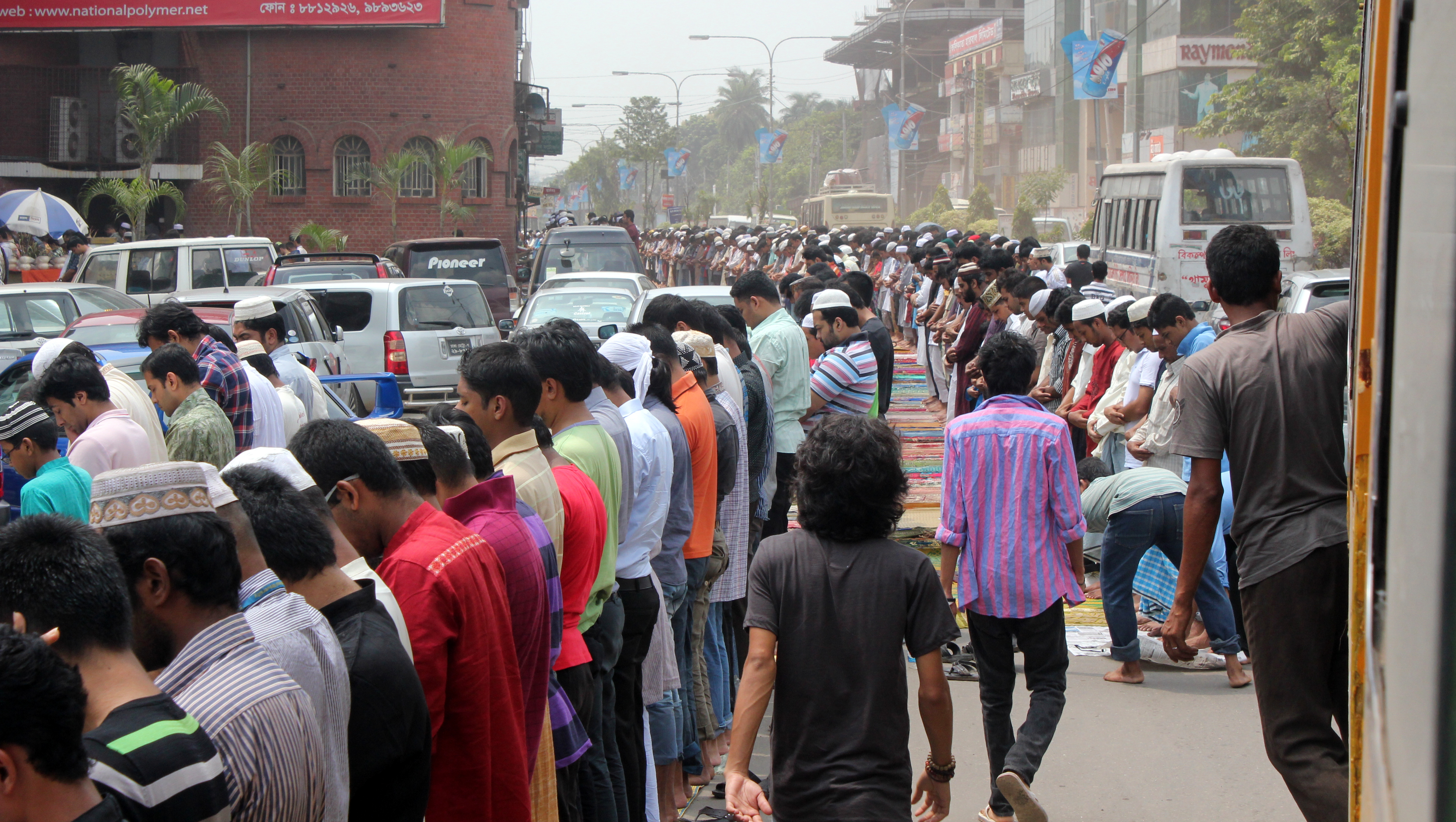
Friday prayer for Sunni Muslims in Dhaka, Bangladesh

===== Islamic schools and branches =====
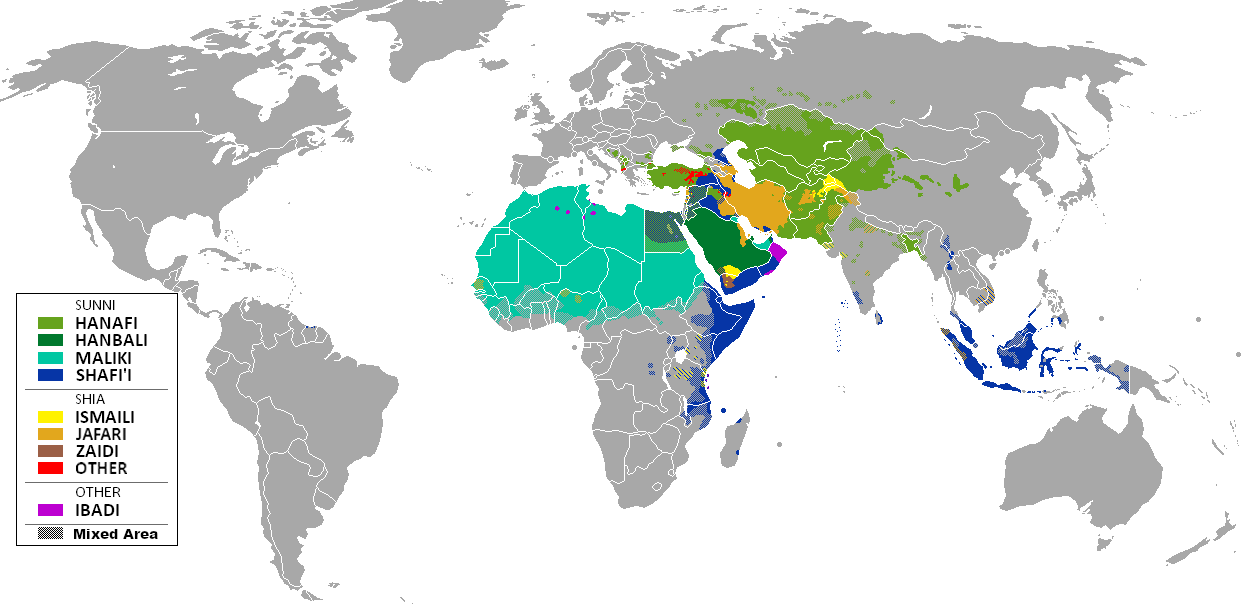
Islamic schools of law across the Muslim world

The first centuries of Islam gave rise to three major sects: Sunnis, Shi'as and Kharijites. Each sect developed distinct jurisprudence schools (madhhab) reflecting different methodologies of jurisprudence (fiqh).

The major Sunni madhhabs are Hanafi, Maliki, Shafi'i, and Hanbali.

The major Shi'a branches are Twelver (Imami), Ismaili (Sevener) and Zaidi (Fiver). Isma'ilism later split into Nizari Ismaili and Musta’li Ismaili, and then Mustaali was divided into Hafizi and Taiyabi Ismailis. It also gave rise to the Qarmatian movement and the Druze faith, although Druzes do not identify as Muslims. Twelver Shiism developed Ja'fari jurisprudence whose branches are Akhbarism and Usulism, and other movements such as Alawites, Shaykism and Alevism.

Similarly, Kharijites were initially divided into five major branches: Sufris, Azariqa, Najdat, Adjarites and Ibadis.

Among these numerous branches, only Hanafi, Maliki, Shafi'i, Hanbali, Imamiyyah-Ja'fari-Usuli, Nizārī Ismā'īlī, Alevi, Zaydi, Ibadi, Zahiri, Alawite, Druze and Taiyabi communities have survived. In addition, new schools of thought and movements like Quranist Muslims and Ahmadi Muslims later emerged independently.

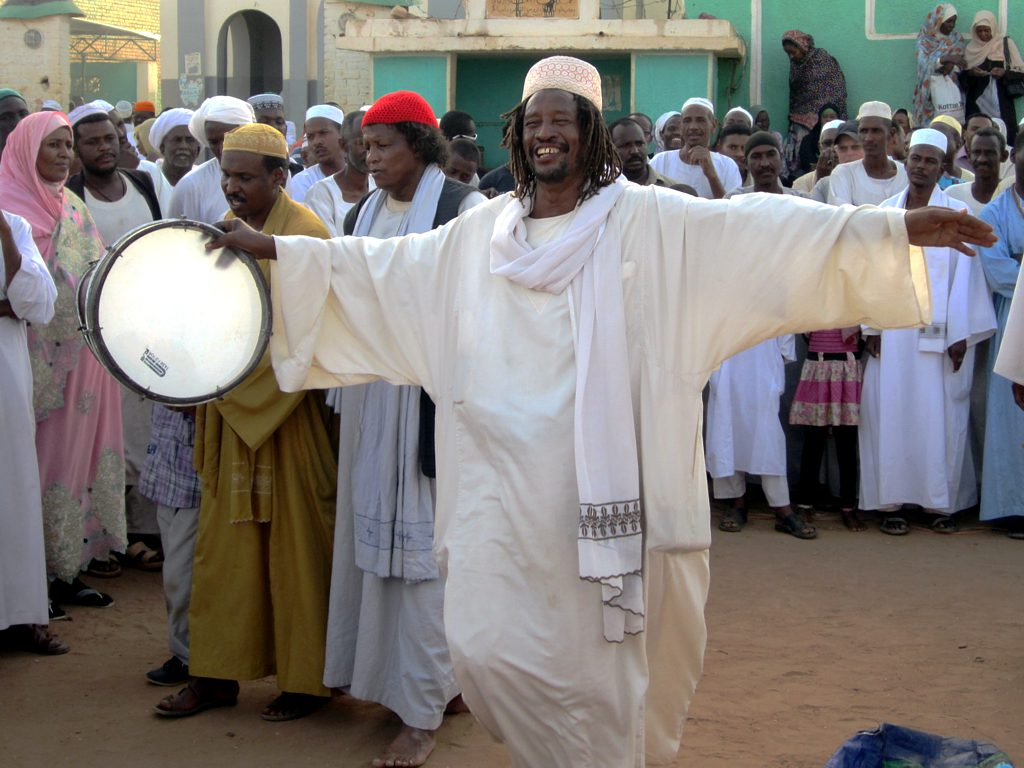
A Sufi dervish drums up the Friday afternoon crowd in Omdurman, Sudan.

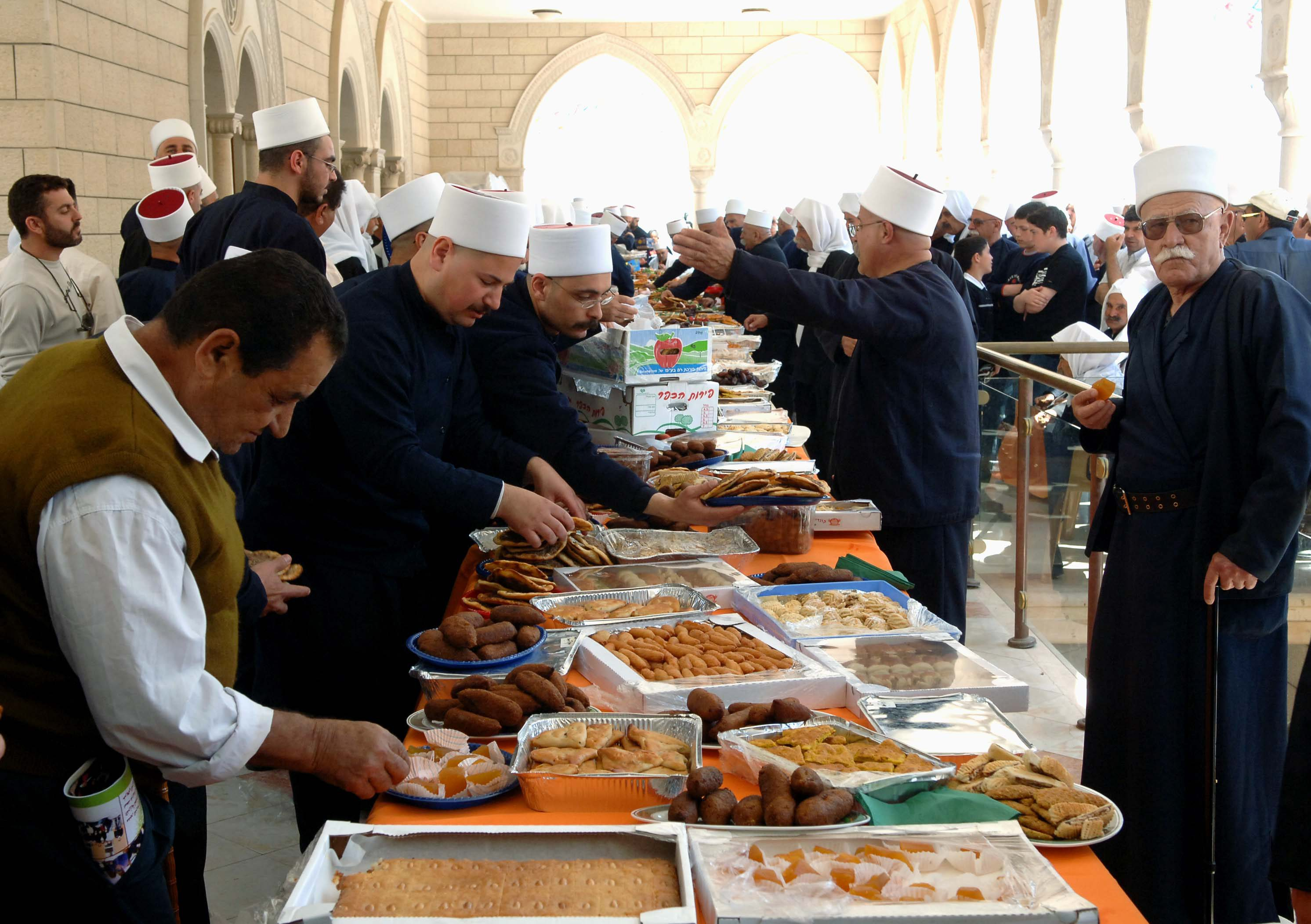
Druze dignitaries celebrating the Nabi Shu'ayb festival at the tomb of the prophet in Hittin

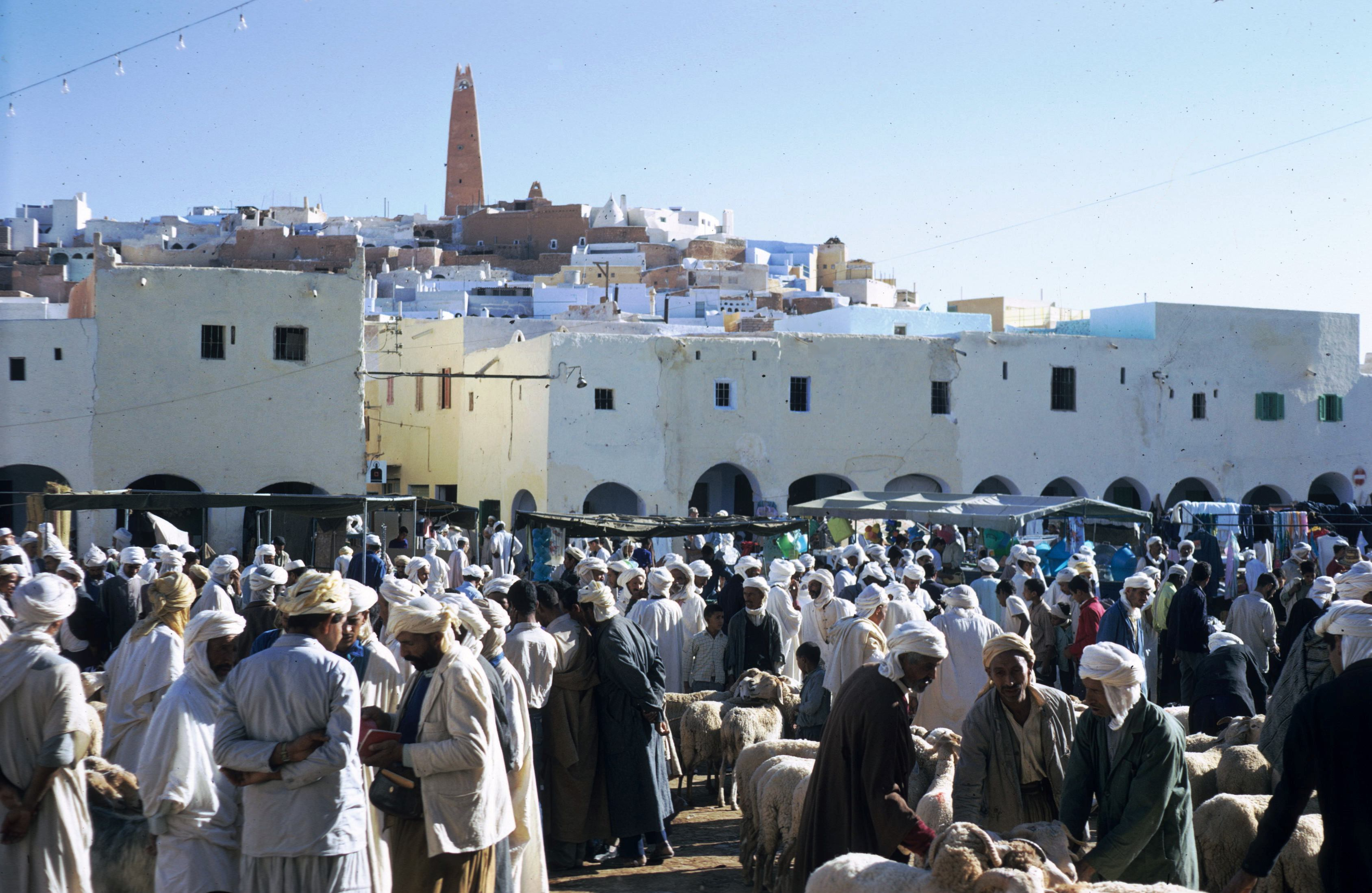
Ibadis living in the M'zab valley in Algerian Sahara

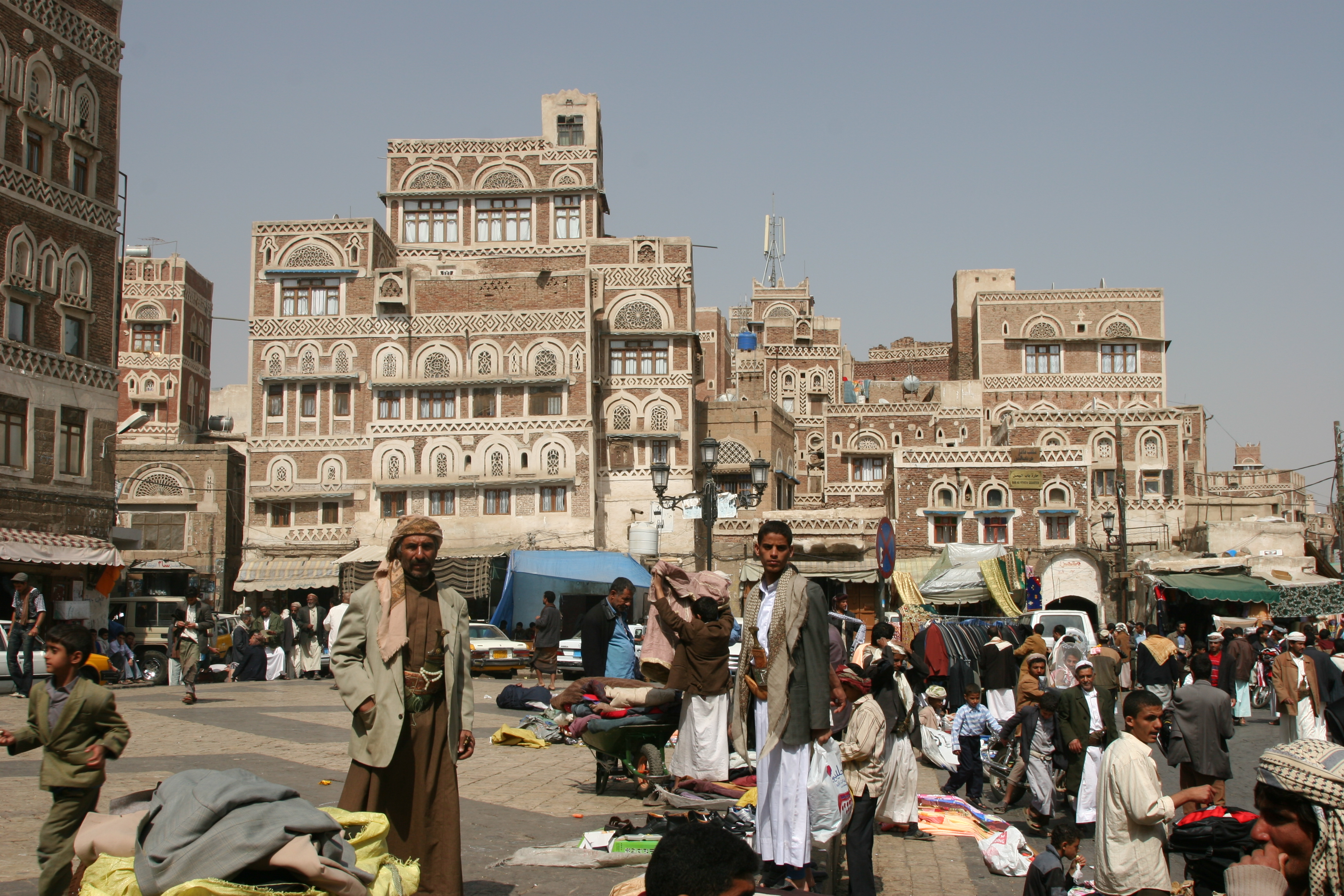
Zaydi Imams ruled in Yemen until 1962.

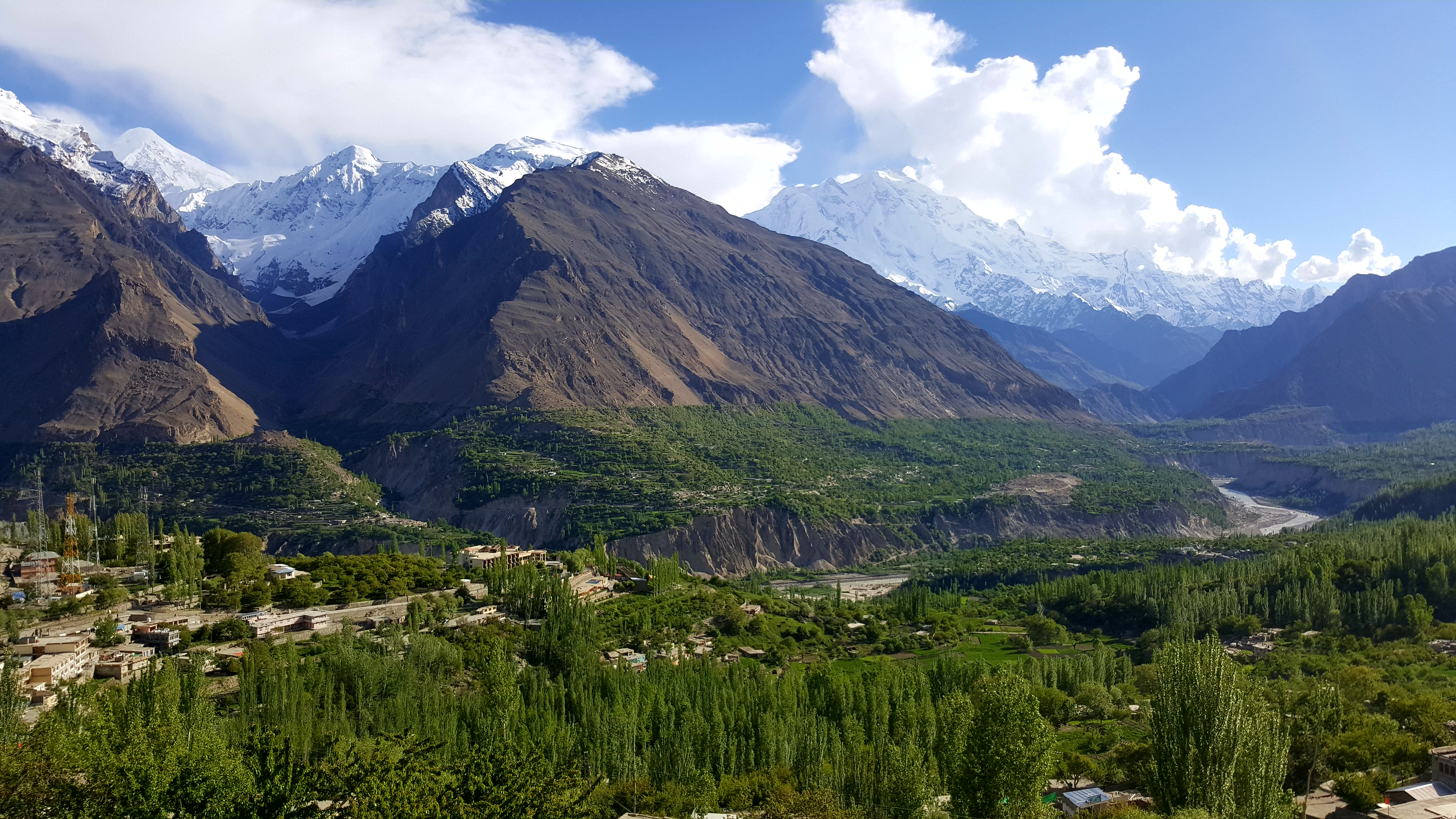
Most of the inhabitants of the Hunza Valley in Pakistan are Ismaili Muslims.
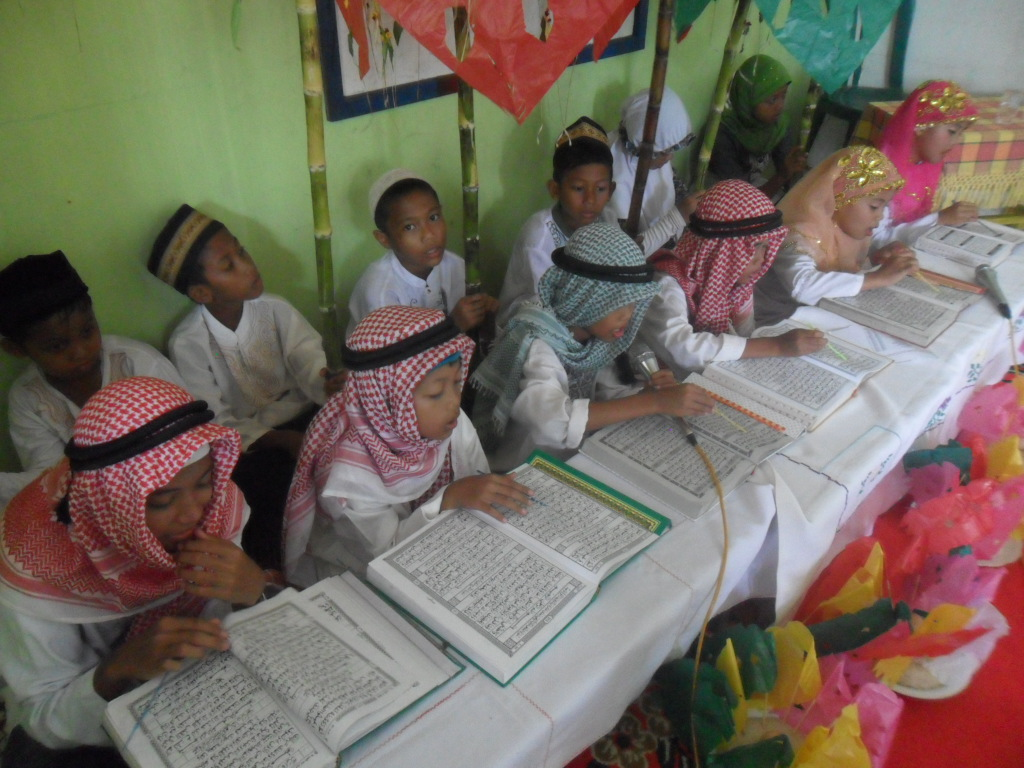
Children read Qur'an in Indonesia.

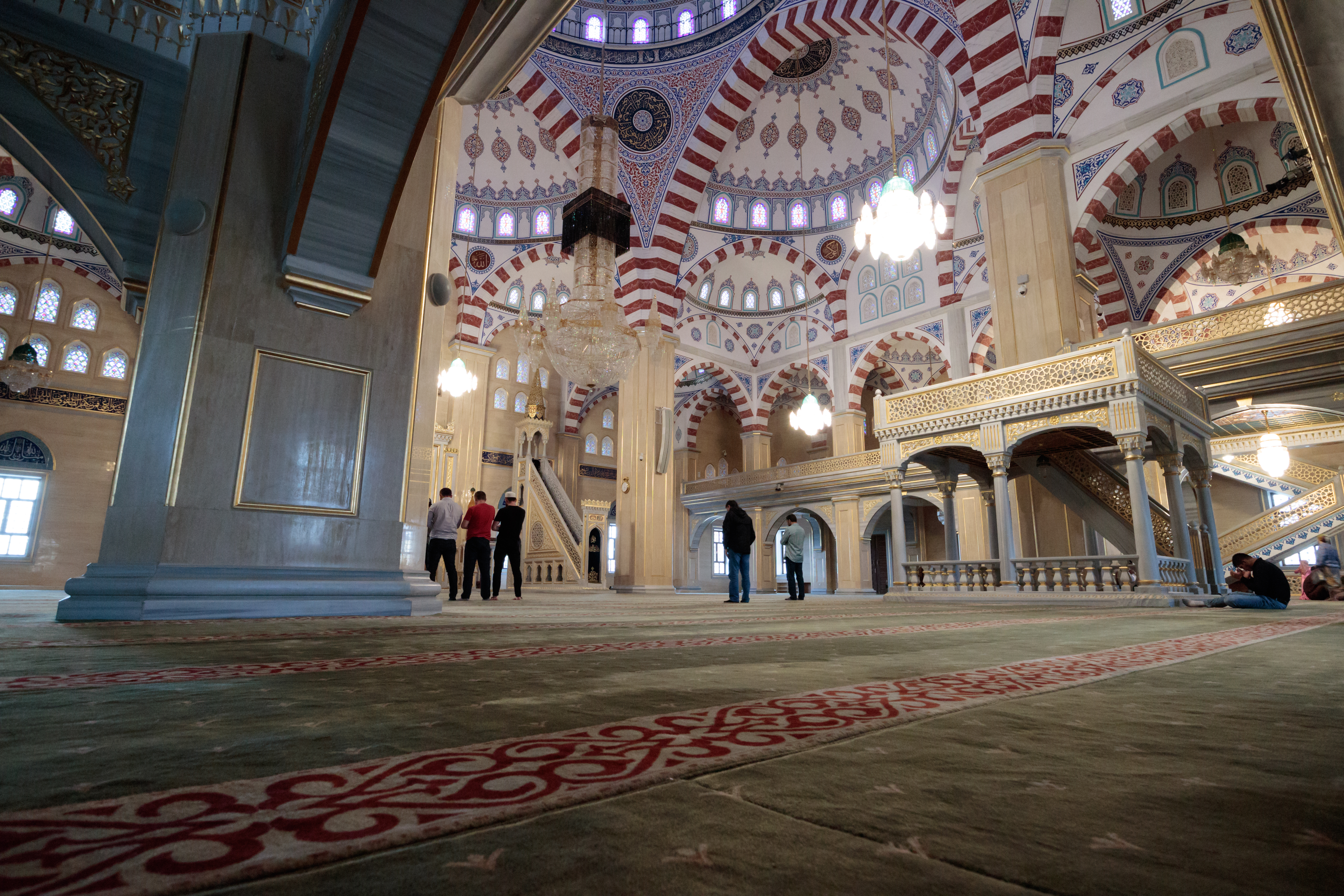
People pray together in the mosque in Russia.

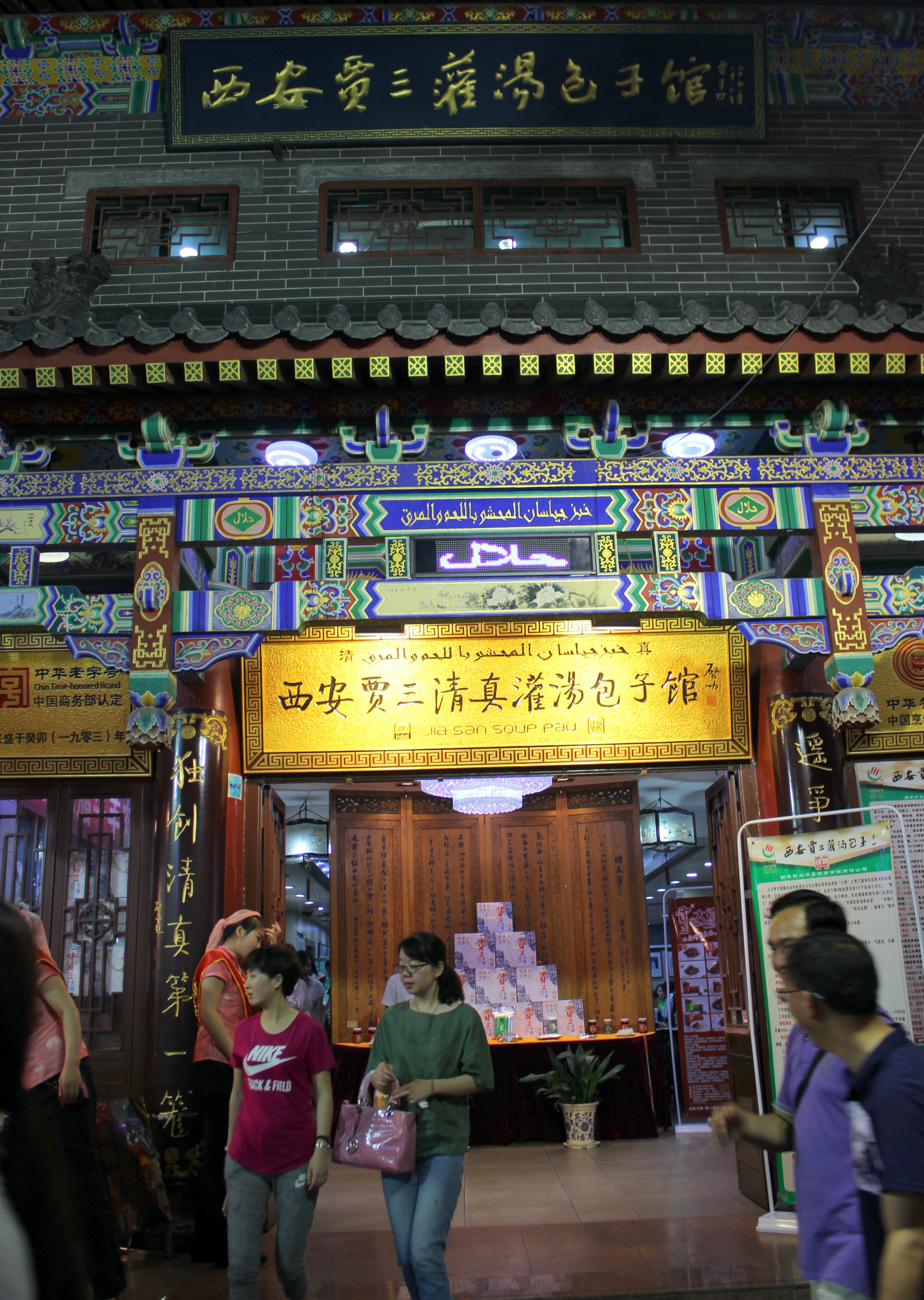
People move close to the Muslim food corner in China.

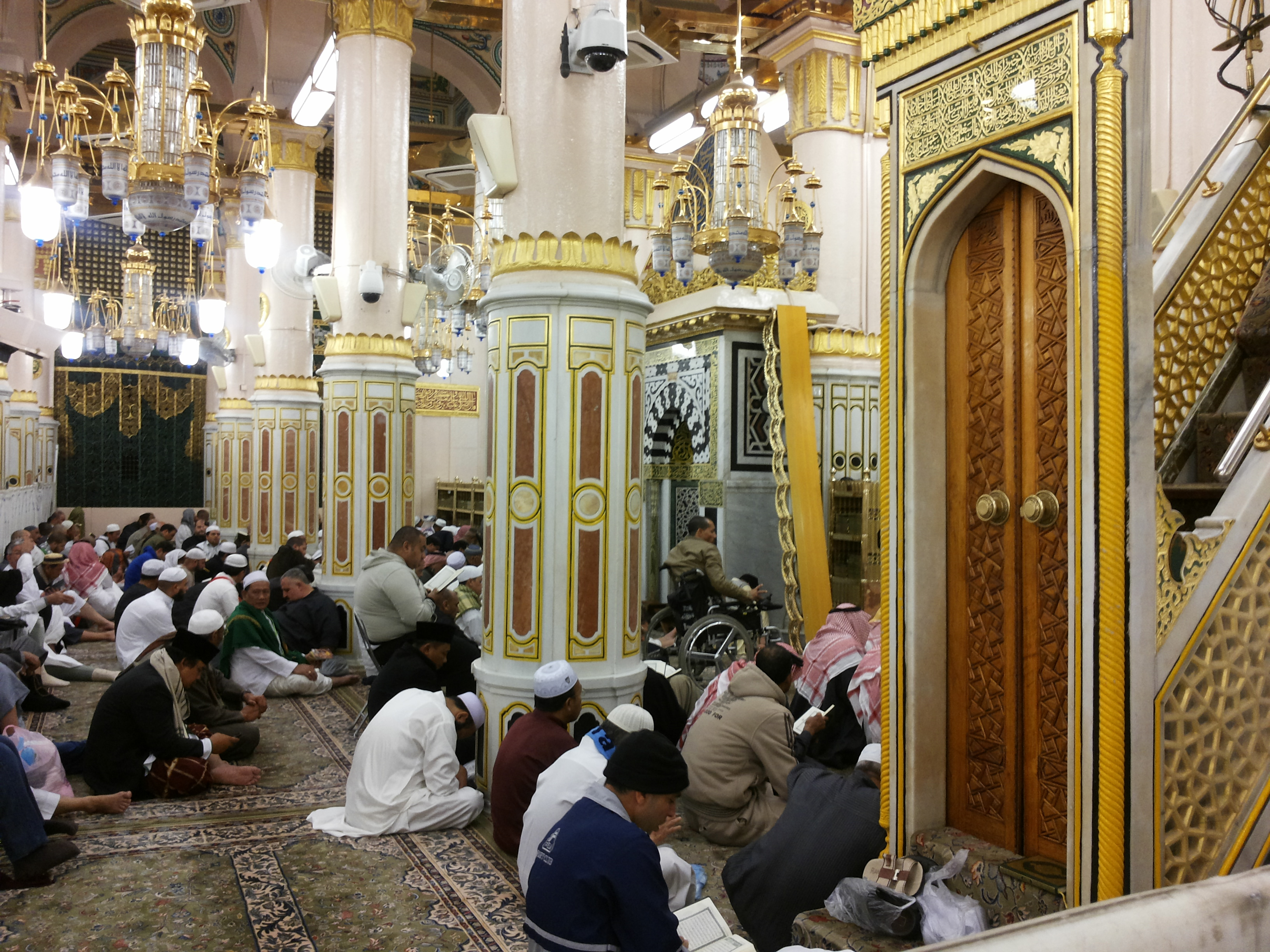
People praying in the Prophet's Mosque (Medina, Saudi Arabia)

==== Other religions ====
There are sizeable non-Muslim minorities in many Muslim-majority countries, includes, Christians, Jews, Hindus, Buddhists, Baháʼís, Druzes, Yazidis, Mandaeans, Yarsanis and Zoroastrians.

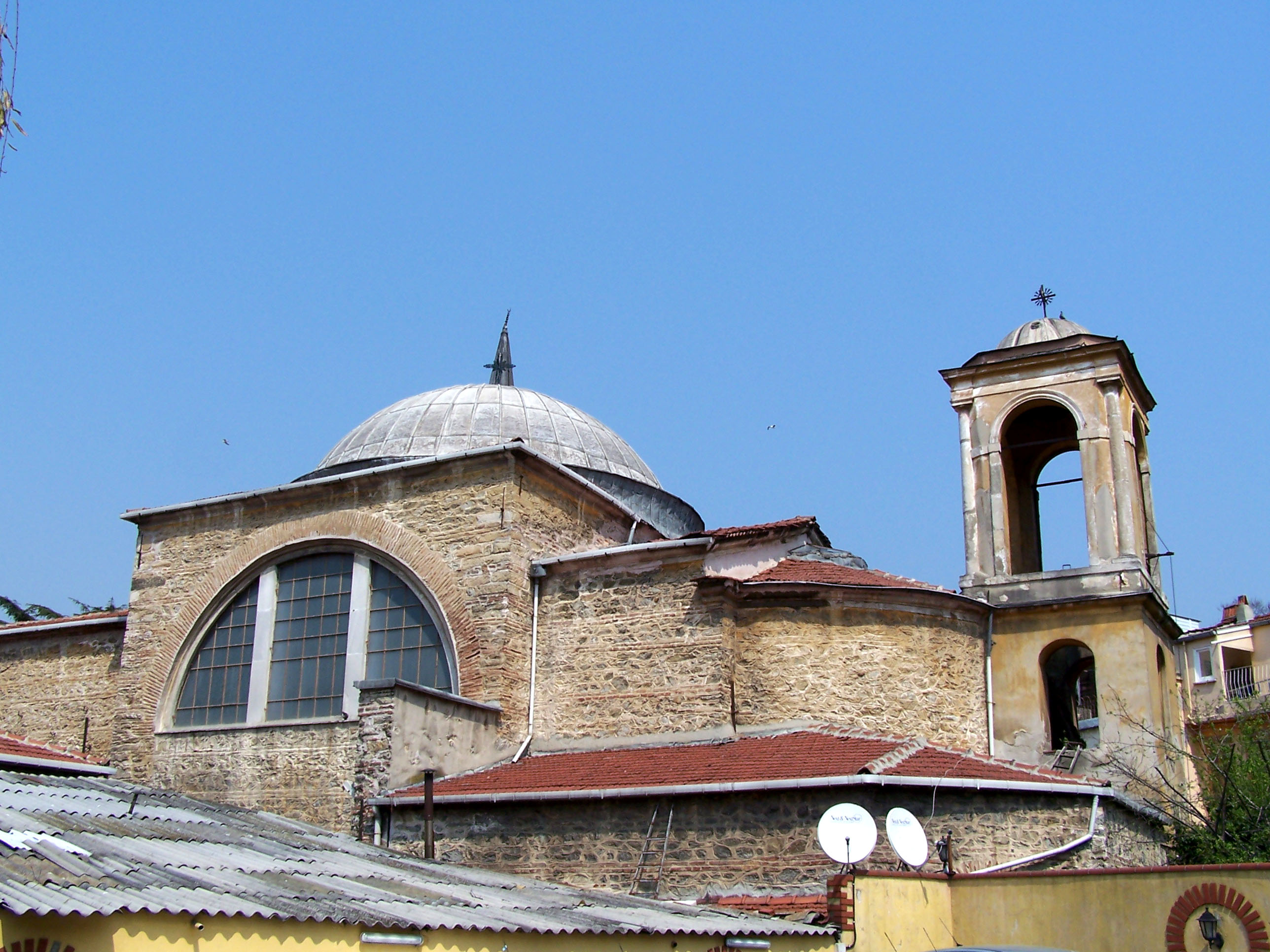
Church and Mosque in Istanbul, Turkey

The Muslim world is home to some of the world's most ancient Christian communities, and some of the most important cities of the Christian world—including three of its five great patriarchates (Alexandria, Antioch, and Constantinople). Scholars and intellectuals agree Christians have made significant contributions to Arab and Islamic civilization since the introduction of Islam, and they have had a significant impact contributing the culture of the Middle East and North Africa and other areas. Pew Research Center estimates indicate that in 2010, more than 64 million Christians lived in countries with Muslim majorities (excluding Nigeria). The Pew Forum study finds that Indonesia (21.1 million) has the largest Christian population in the Muslim world, followed by Egypt, Chad and Kazakhstan. While according to Adly A. Youssef and Martyn Thomas, in 2004, there were around 30 million Christians who lived in countries with Muslim majorities, with the largest Christian population number lived in Indonesia, followed by Egypt. Nigeria is divided almost evenly between Muslims and Christians, with more than 80 million Christians and Muslims.

In 2018, the Jewish Agency estimated that around 27,000 Jews live in Arab and Muslim countries. Jewish communities have existed across the Middle East and North Africa since the rise of Islam. Today, Jews residing in Muslim countries have been reduced to a small fraction of their former sizes, with the largest communities of Jews in Muslim countries exist in the non-Arab countries of Iran (9,500) and Turkey (14,500); both, however, are much smaller than they historically have been. Among Arab countries, the largest Jewish community now exists in Palestine with about 250,000 Jews, Morocco with about 2,000 Jews, and in Tunisia with about 1,000. The number of Druze worldwide is between 800,000 and one million, with the vast majority residing in the Levant (primarily in Syria and Lebanon).

In 2010, a Pew Forum study found that Bangladesh (13.5 million), Indonesia (4 million), Pakistan (3.3 million) and Malaysia (1.7 million) have sizeable Hindu minorities. Malaysia (5 million) has the largest Buddhist population in the Muslim world. Zoroastrians are the oldest remaining religious community in Iran.

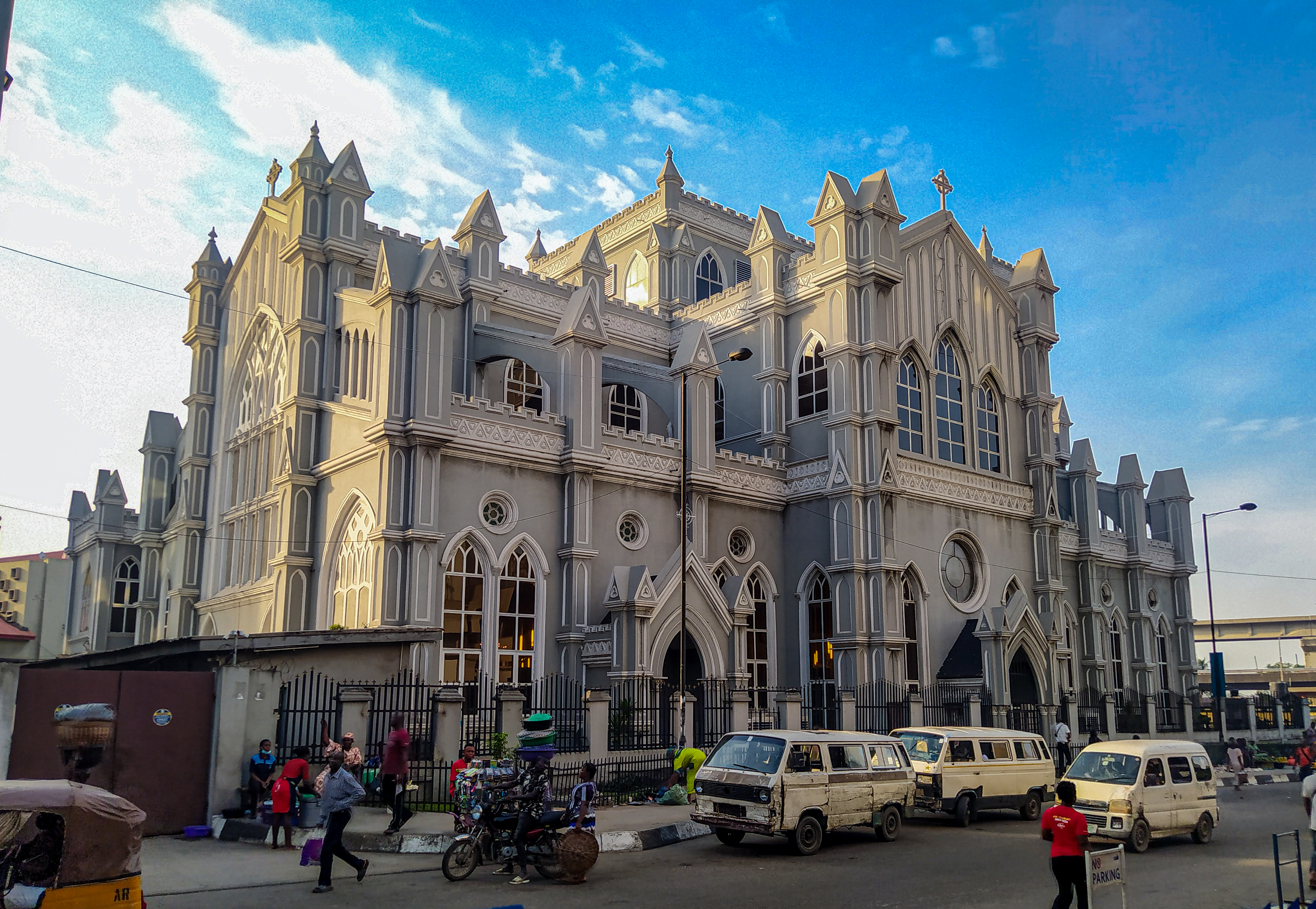
Nigeria has the largest Christian population in the Muslim world.

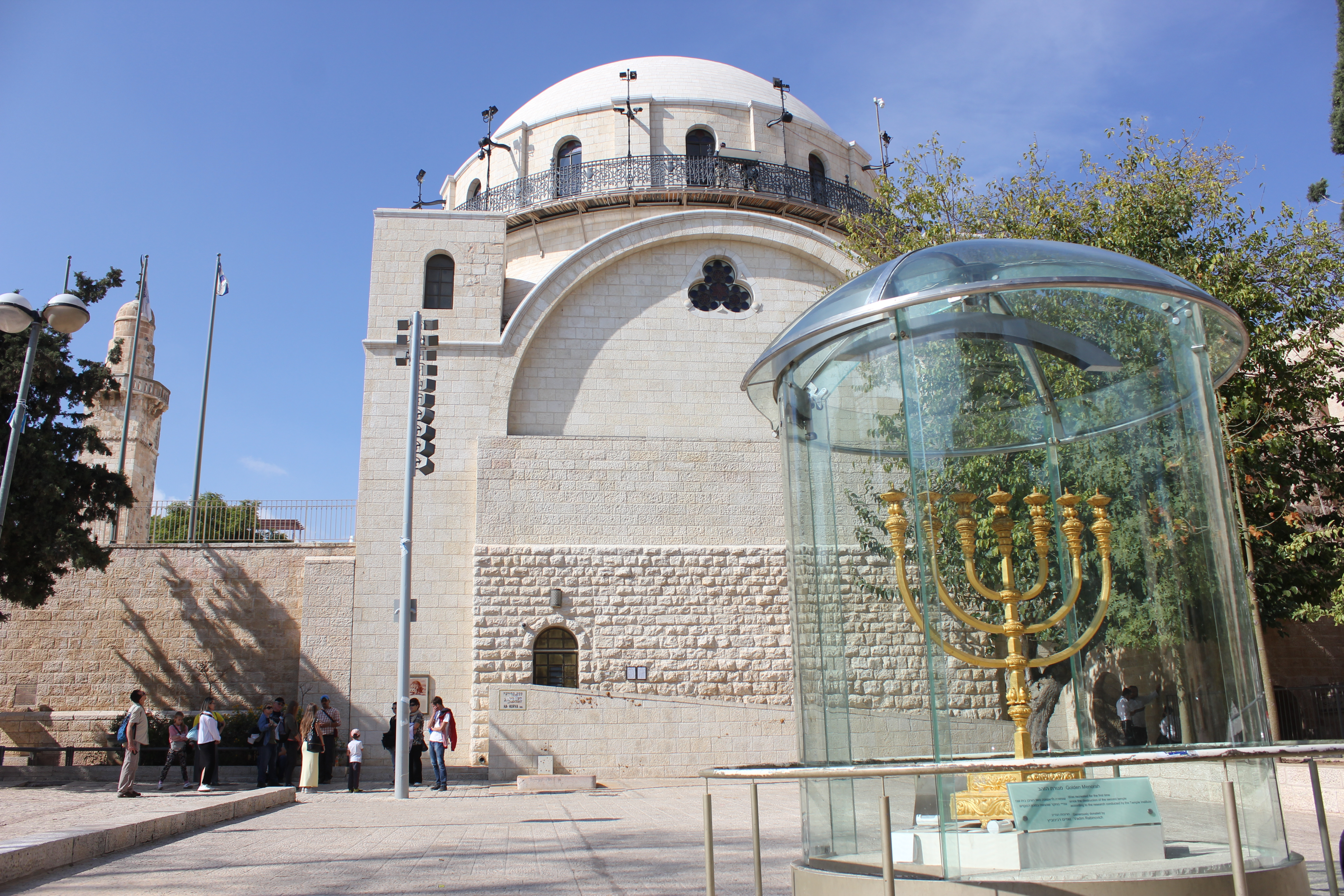
Palestine has the largest Jewish population in the Muslim world.

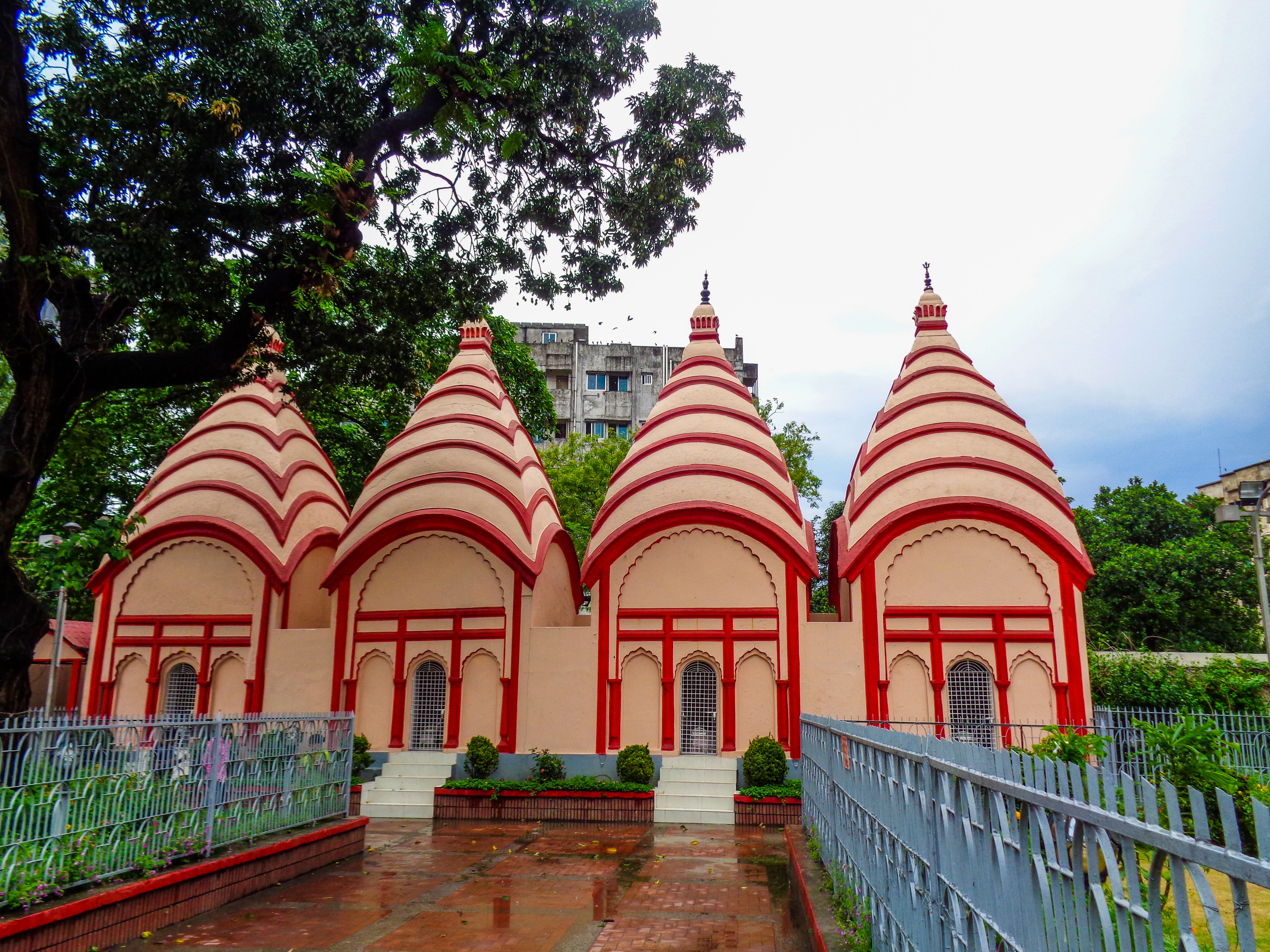
Bangladesh has the largest Hindu population in the Muslim world.

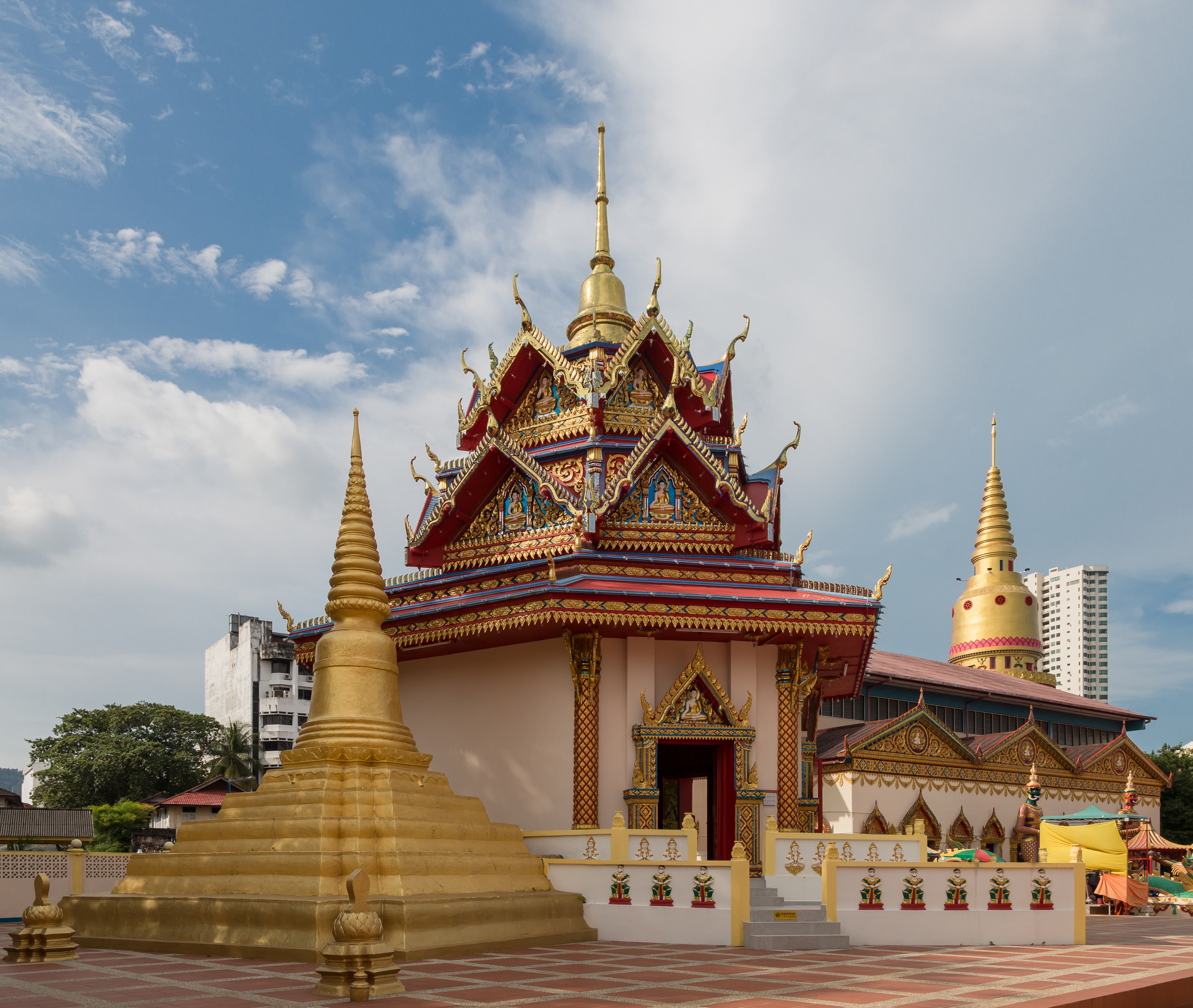
Malaysia has the largest Bhuddhist population in the Muslim world.

=== Literacy and education ===
The literacy rate in the Muslim world varies. Azerbaijan is in second place in the Index of Literacy of World Countries. Some members such as Iran, Kuwait, Kazakhstan, Tajikistan and Turkmenistan have over 97% literacy rates, whereas literacy rates are the lowest in Mali, Afghanistan, Chad and other parts of Africa. Several Muslim-majority countries, such as Turkey, Iran and Egypt have a high rate of citable scientific publications.

In 2015, the International Islamic News Agency reported that nearly 37% of the population of the Muslim world is unable to read or write, basing that figure on reports from the Organisation of Islamic Cooperation and the Islamic Educational, Scientific and Cultural Organization. In Egypt, the largest Muslim-majority Arab country, the youth female literacy rate exceeds that for males. Lower literacy rates are more prevalent in South Asian countries such as in Afghanistan and Pakistan, but are rapidly increasing. In the Eastern Middle East, Iran has a high level of youth literacy at 98%, but Iraq's youth literacy rate has sharply declined from 85% to 57% during the American-led war and subsequent occupation. Indonesia, the largest Muslim-majority country in the world, has a 99% youth literacy rate.

A 2011 Pew Research Center showed that at the time about 36% of all Muslims had no formal schooling, with only 8% having graduate and post-graduate degrees. The highest of years of schooling among Muslim-majority countries found in Uzbekistan (11.5), Kuwait (11.0) and Kazakhstan (10.7). In addition, the average of years of schooling in countries in which Muslims are the majority is 6.0 years of schooling, which lag behind the global average (7.7 years of schooling). In the youngest age (25–34) group surveyed, Young Muslims have the lowest average levels of education of any major religious group, with an average of 6.7 years of schooling, which lag behind the global average (8.6 years of schooling). The study found that Muslims have a significant amount of gender inequality in educational attainment, since Muslim women have an average of 4.9 years of schooling, compared to an average of 6.4 years of schooling among Muslim men.

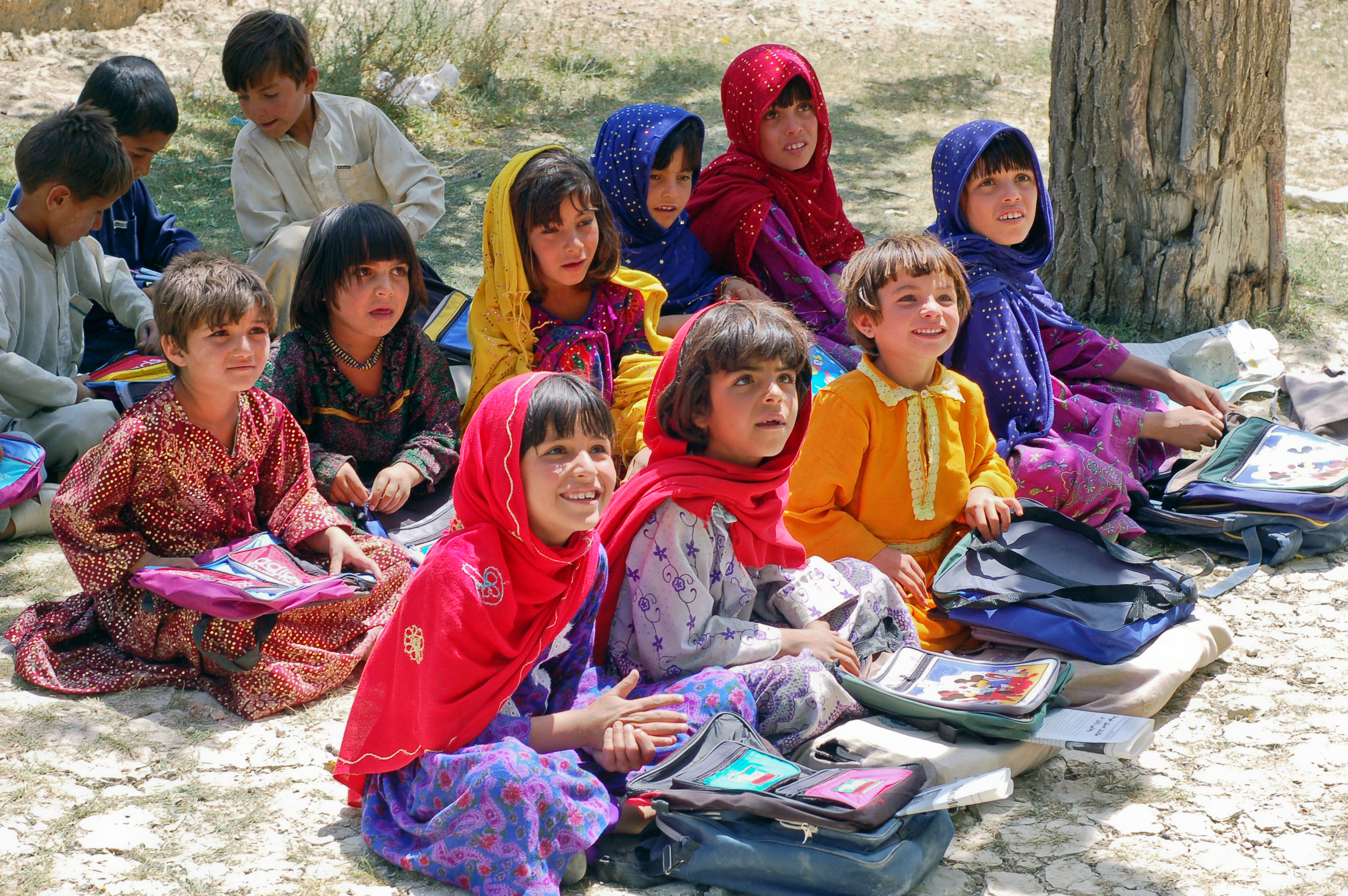
Young school girls in Paktia Province of Afghanistan

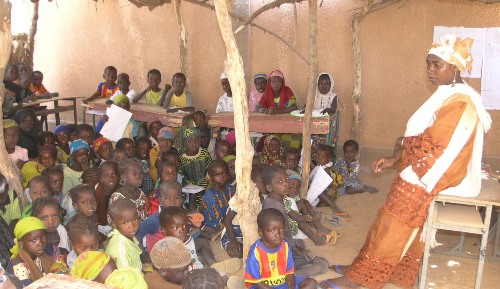
A primary classroom in Niger

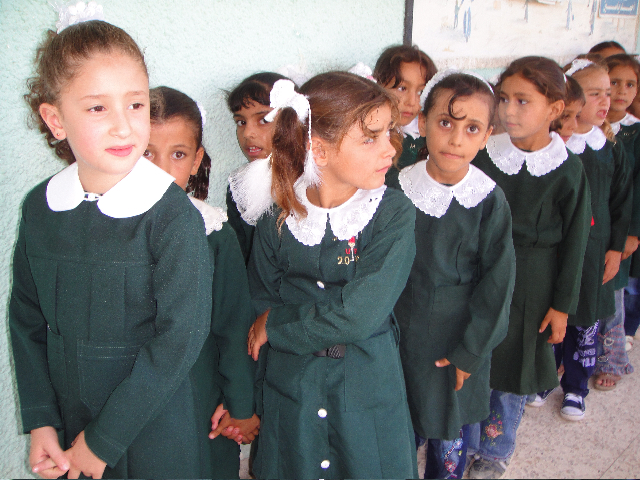
Schoolgirls in Gaza lining up for class, 2009

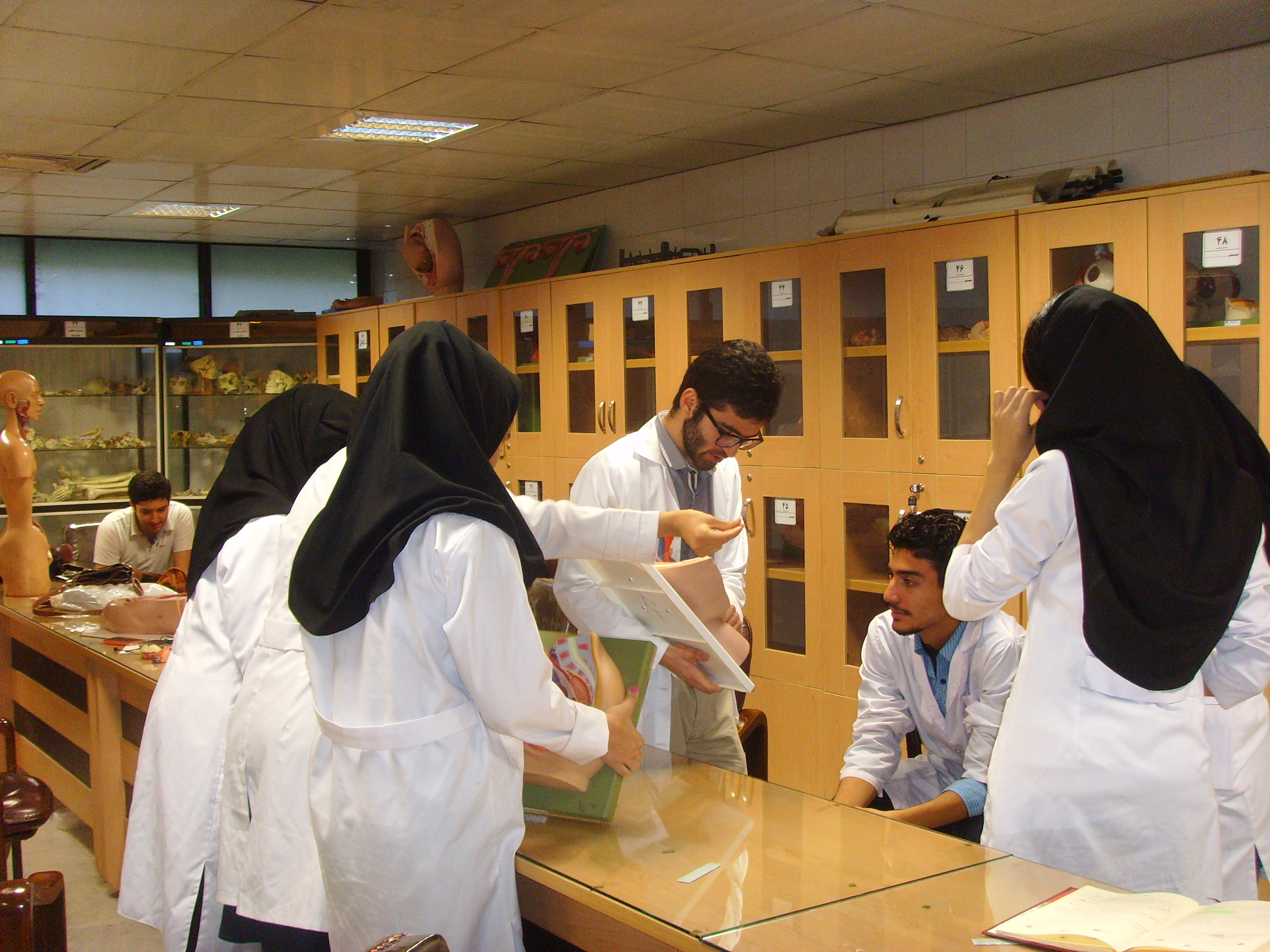
Medical students of anatomy, before an exam in moulage, Iran

=== Refugees ===
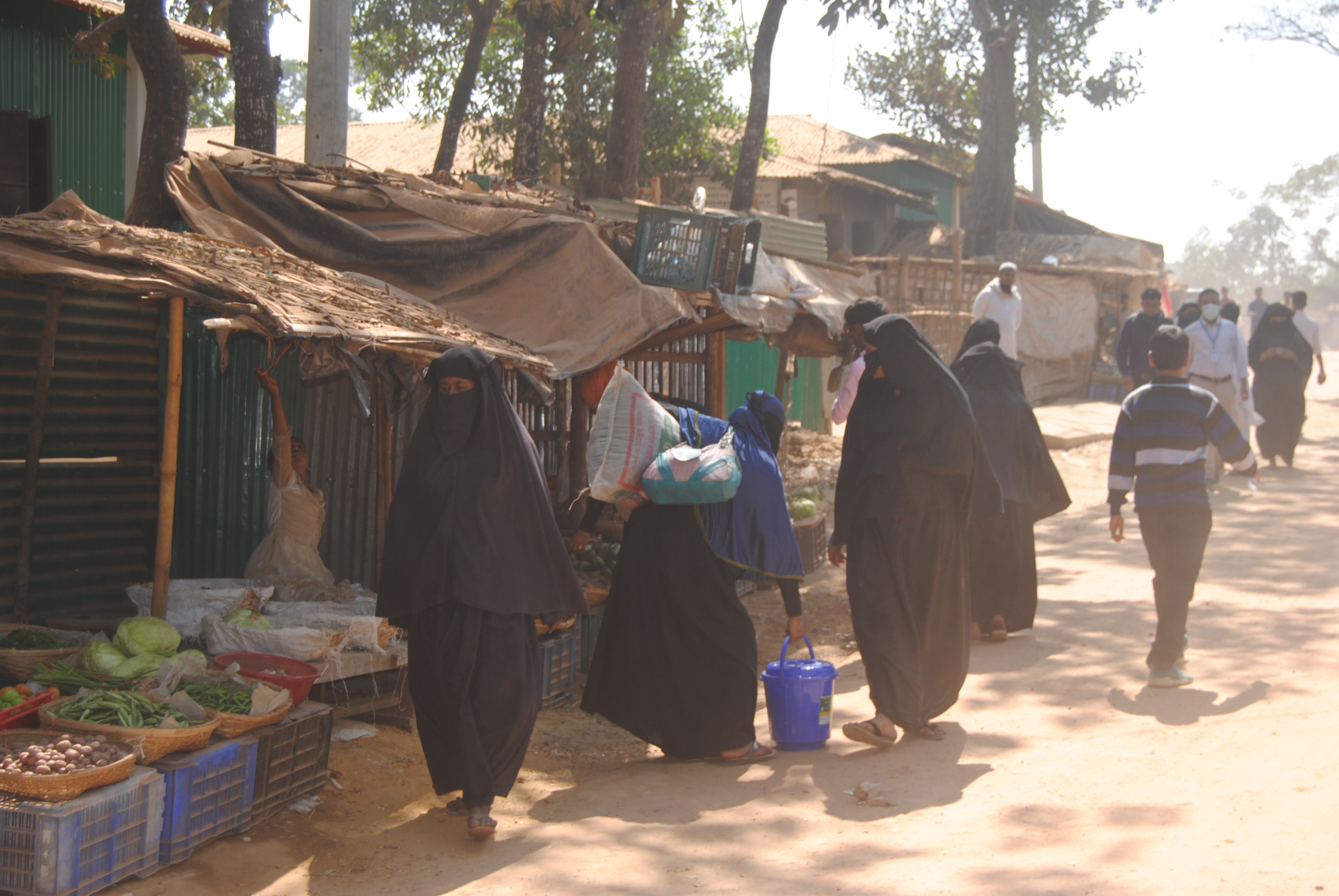
Muslim Rohingya refugees in Cox's Bazar, Bangladesh

According to the UNHCR, Muslim-majority countries hosted 18 million refugees by the end of 2010.

Since then Muslim-majority countries have absorbed refugees from recent conflicts, including the uprising in Syria. In July 2013, the UN stated that the number of Syrian refugees had exceeded 1.8 million. In Asia, an estimated 625,000 refugees from Rakhine, Myanmar, mostly Muslim, had crossed the border into Bangladesh since August 2017.

== Culture ==
Throughout history, Muslim cultures have been diverse ethnically, linguistically and regionally. According to M. M. Knight, this diversity includes diversity in beliefs, interpretations and practices and communities and interests. Knight says perception of Muslim world among non-Muslims is usually supported through introductory literature about Islam, mostly present a version as per scriptural view which would include some prescriptive literature and abstracts of history as per authors own point of views, to which even many Muslims might agree, but that necessarily would not reflect Islam as lived on the ground, 'in the experience of real human bodies'.

=== Classical culture ===
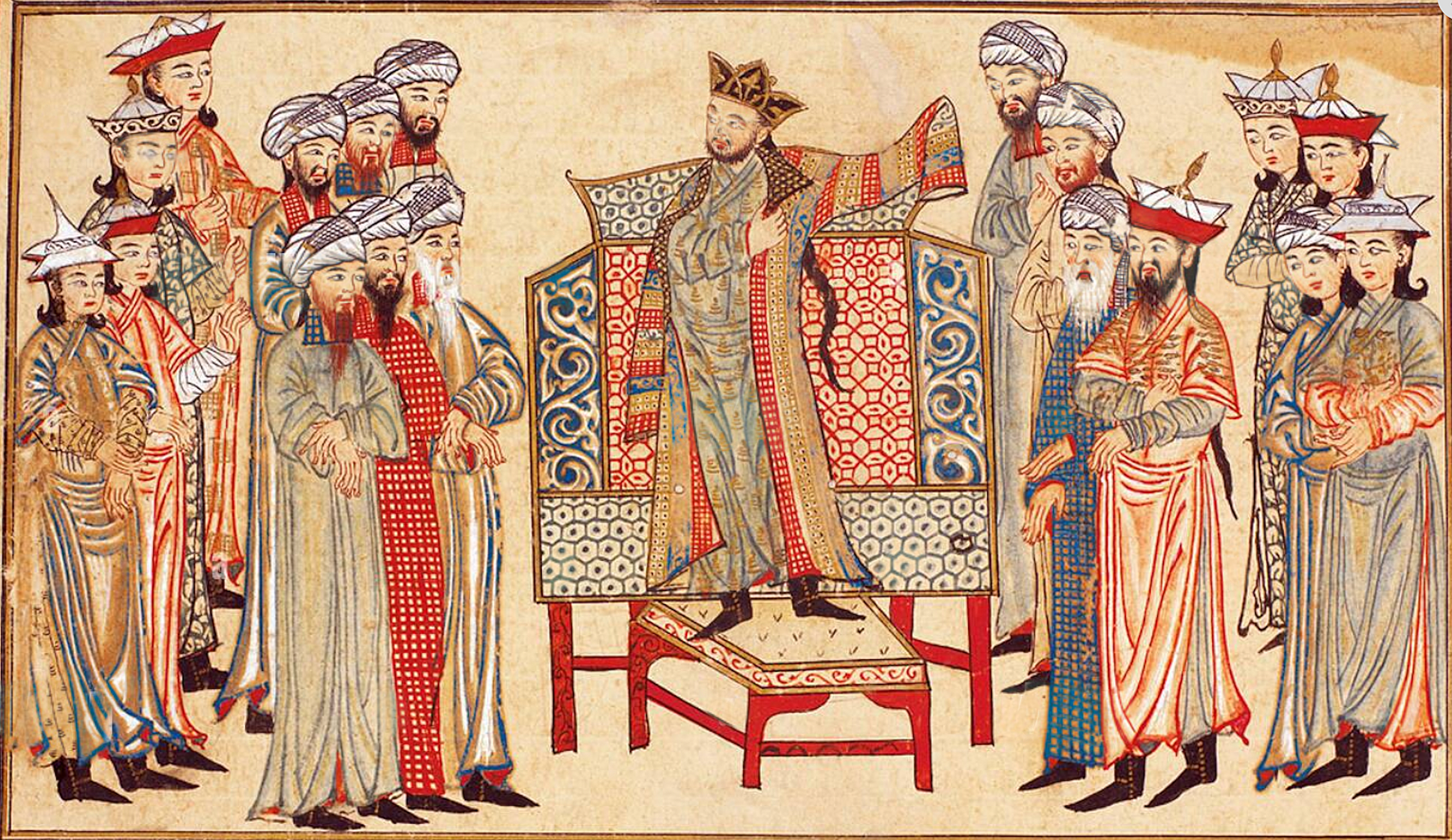
Sultan Mahmud of Ghazni receiving a richly decorated robe of honor from the caliph al-Qadir in 1000. Miniature from the Rashid al-Din's Jami' al-tawarikh

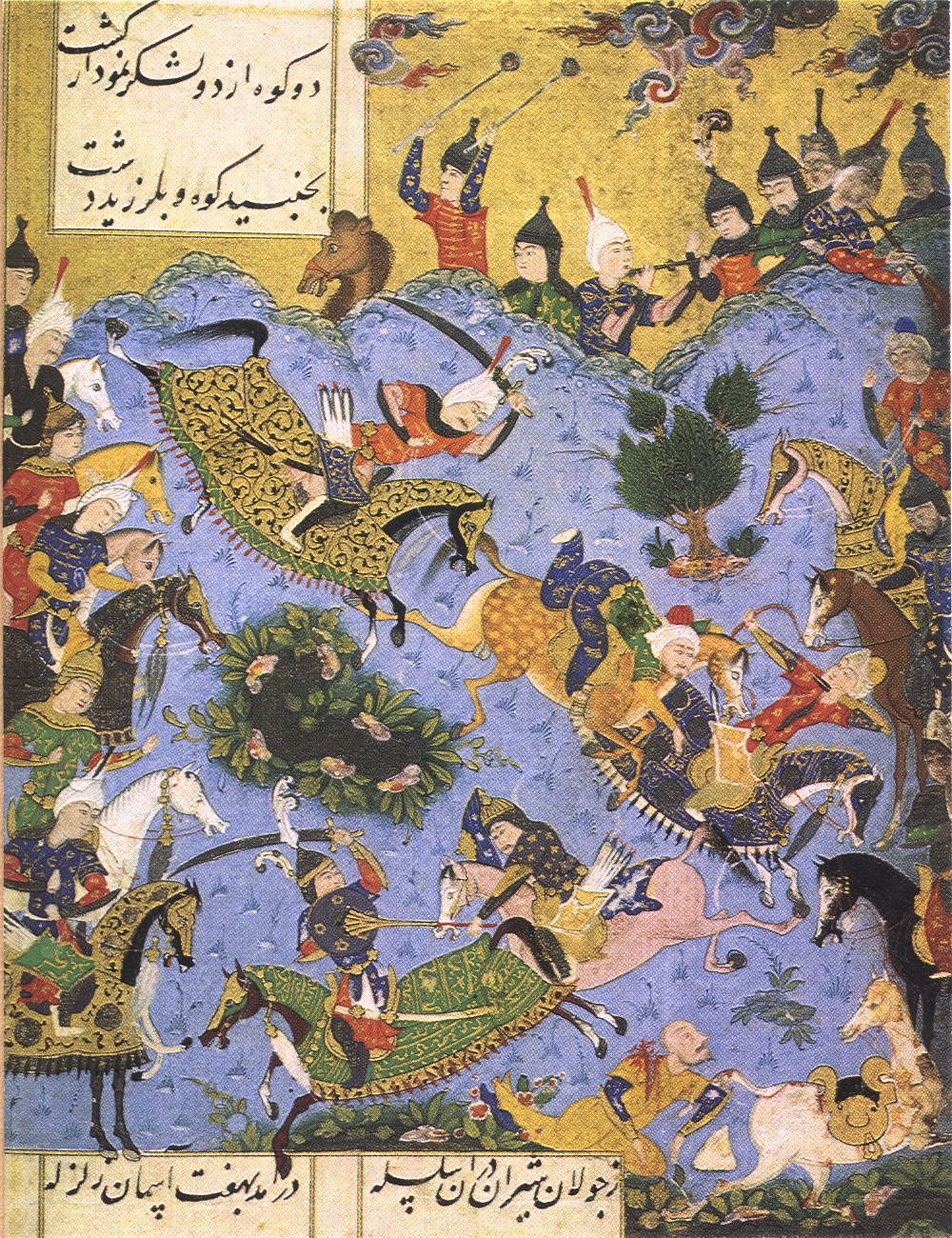
Battle between Ismail of the Safaviyya and the ruler of Shirvan, Farrukh Yassar

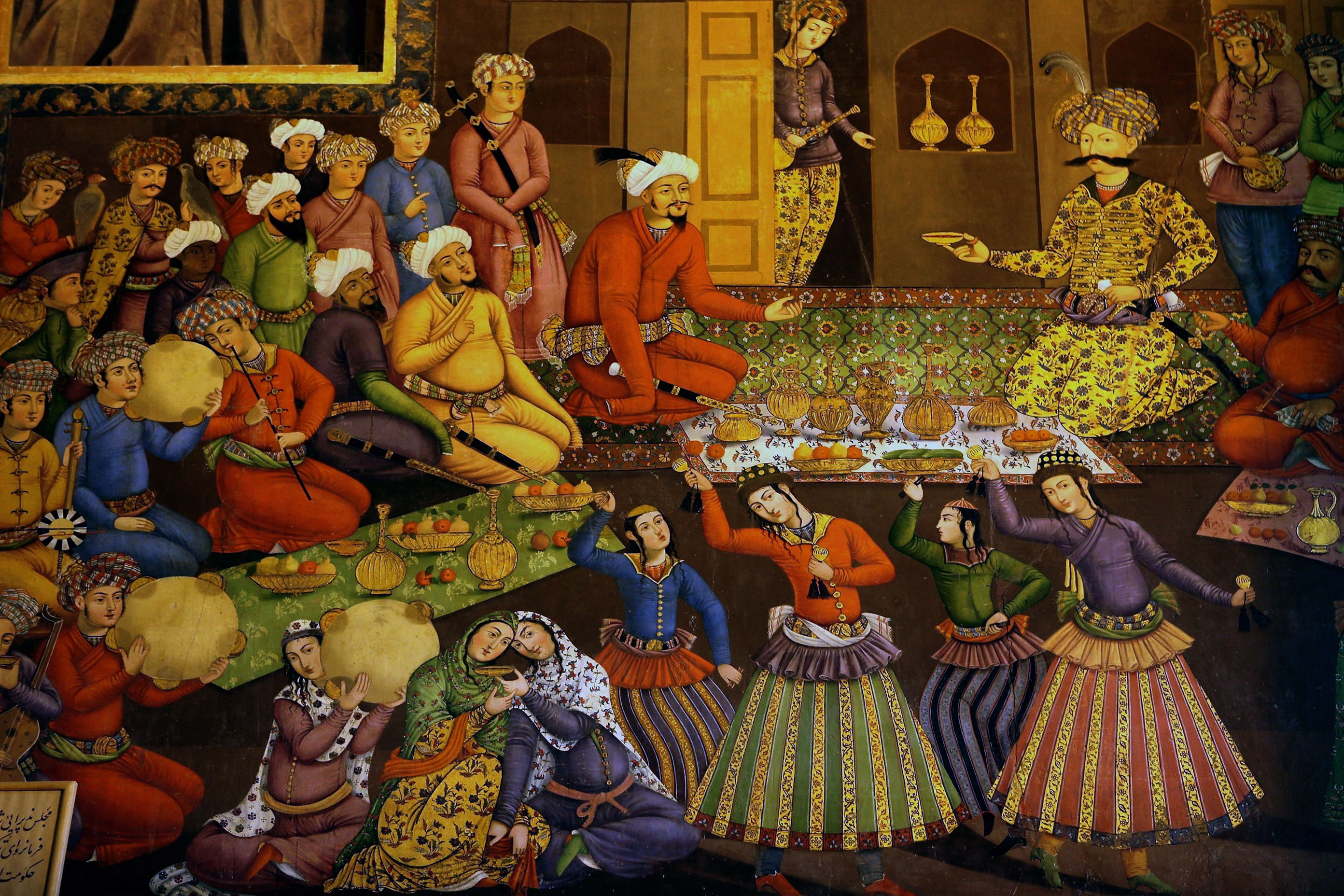
Shah of Safavid Empire Abbas I meet with Vali Muhammad Khan.

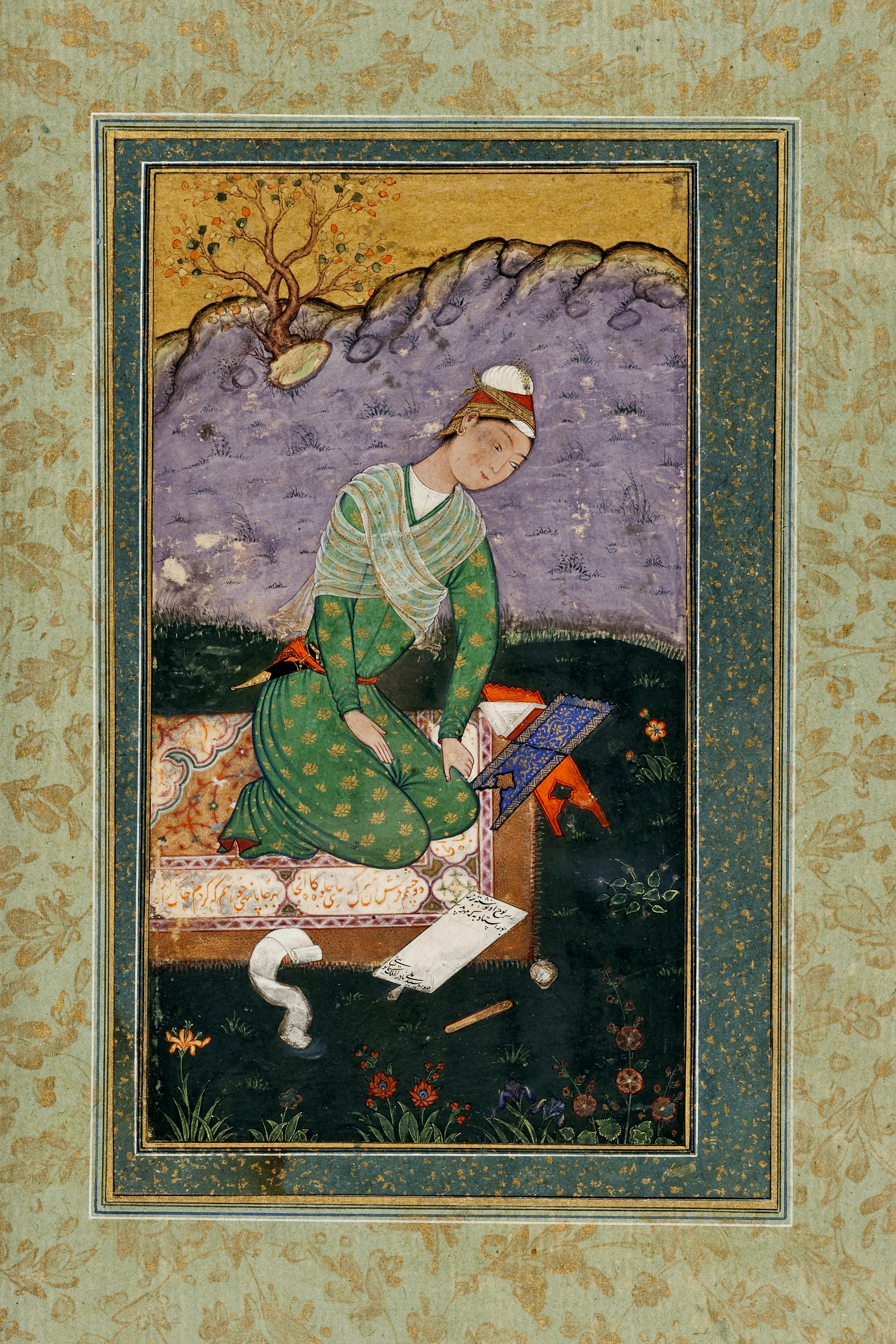
Mir Sayyid Ali, a scholar writing a commentary on the Quran, during the reign of the Mughal Emperor Shah Jahan

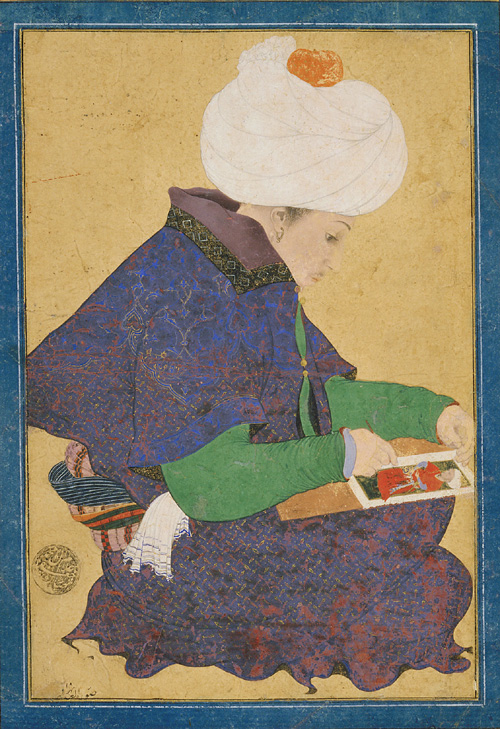
Portrait of a painter during the reign of Ottoman Sultan Mehmet II

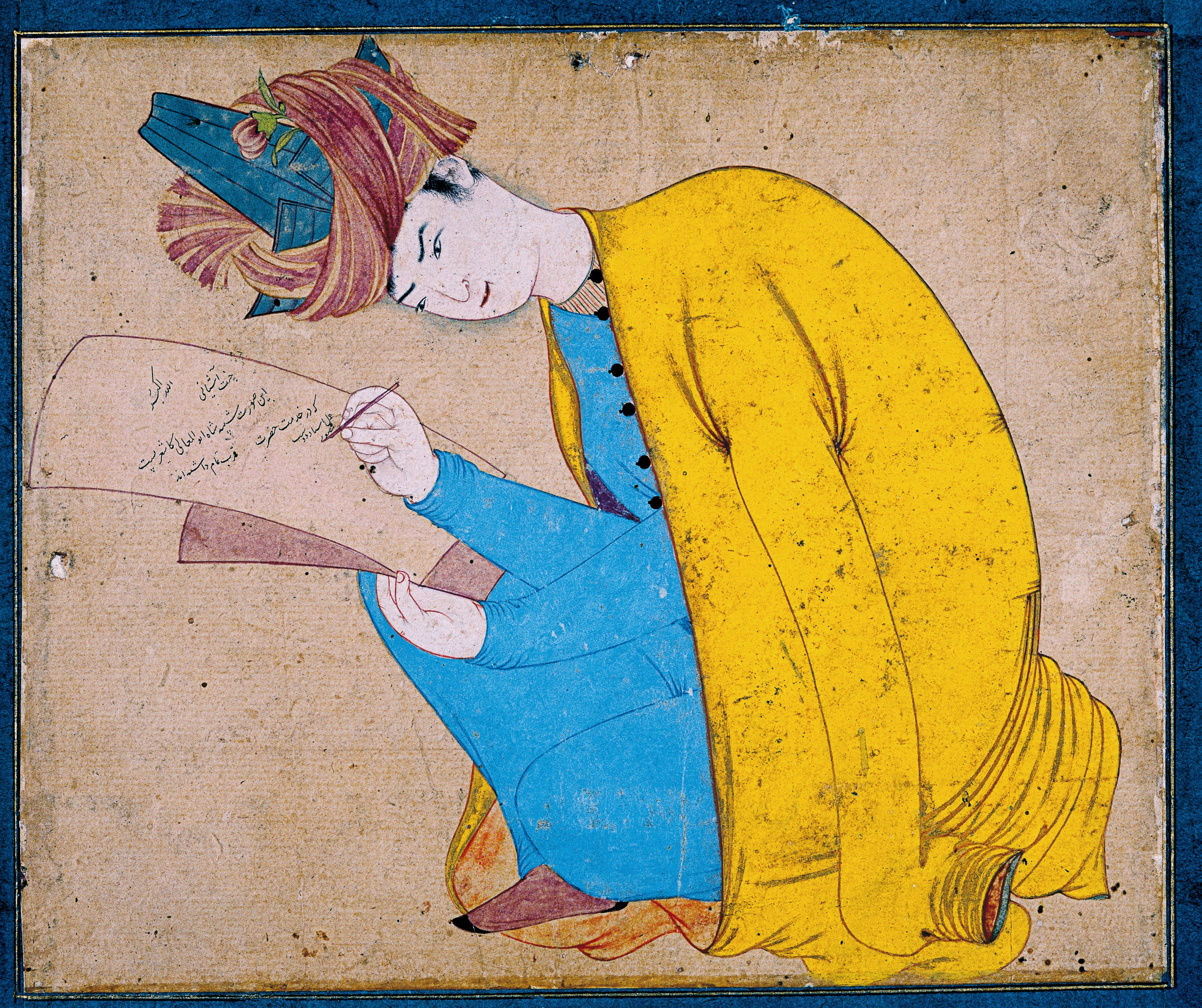
A Persian miniature of Shah Abu'l Ma‘ali, a scholar

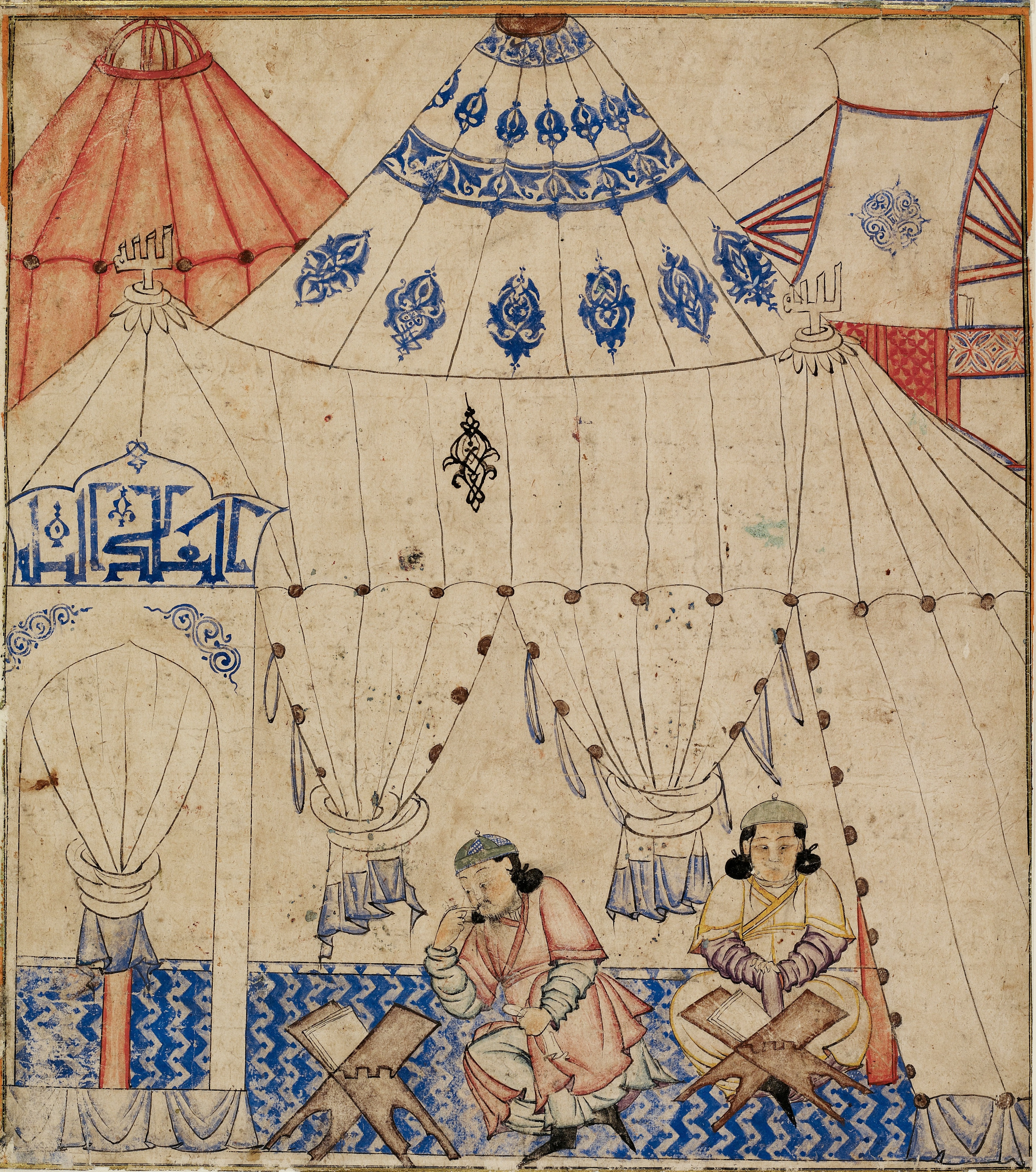
Ilkhanate Empire ruler, Ghazan, studying the Quran

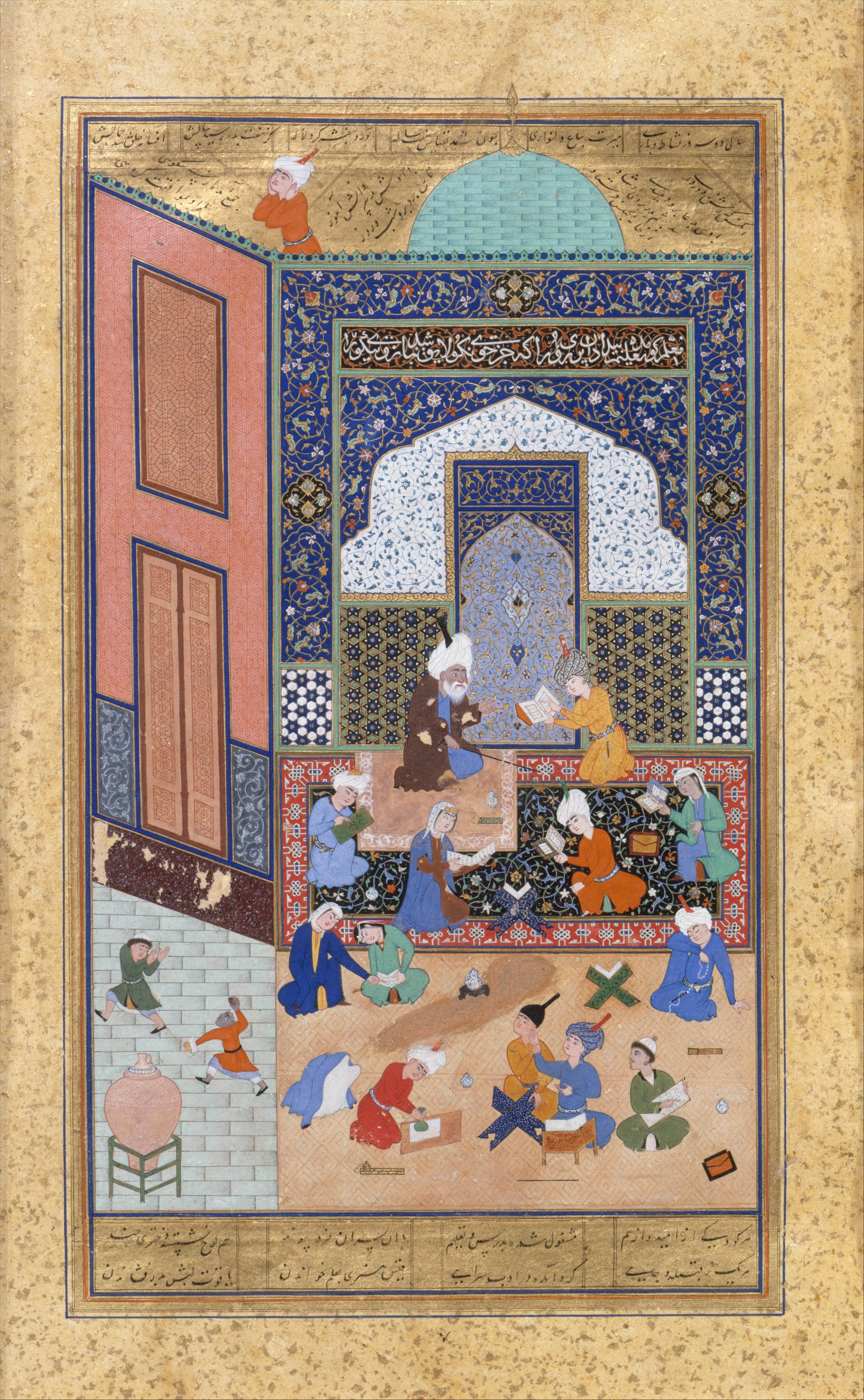
Layla and Majnun studying together, from a Persian miniature painting

The term "Islamic Golden Age" has been attributed to a period in history during which science, economic development and cultural works in most of the Muslim-dominated world flourished. The age is traditionally understood to have begun during the reign of the Abbasid caliph Harun al-Rashid (786–809) with the inauguration of the House of Wisdom in Baghdad, where scholars from various parts of the world sought to translate and gather all the known world's knowledge into Arabic, and to have ended with the collapse of the Abbasid caliphate due to Mongol invasions and the Siege of Baghdad in 1258. The Abbasids were influenced by the Quranic injunctions and hadiths, such as "the ink of a scholar is more holy than the blood of a martyr," that stressed the value of knowledge. The major Islamic capital cities of Baghdad, Cairo, and Córdoba became the main intellectual centers for science, philosophy, medicine, and education. During this period, the Muslim world was a collection of cultures; they drew together and advanced the knowledge gained from the ancient Greek, Roman, Persian, Chinese, Vedic, Egyptian, and Phoenician civilizations.

==== Ceramics ====
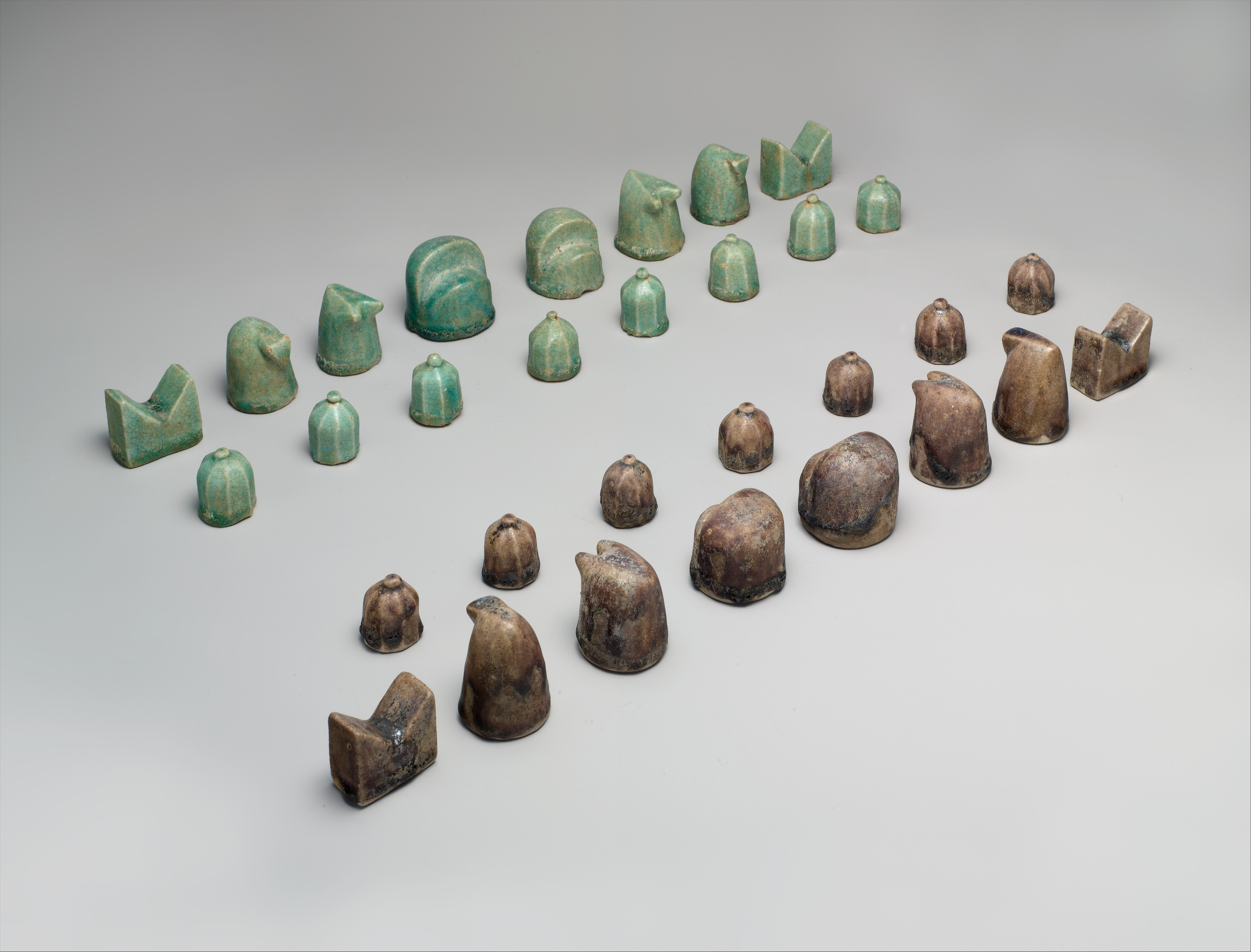
A Seljuq, nearly complete shatranj (chess) set, glazed fritware, 12th century

Between the 8th and 18th centuries, the use of ceramic glaze was prevalent in Islamic art, usually assuming the form of elaborate pottery. Tin-opacified glazing was one of the earliest new technologies developed by the Islamic potters. The first Islamic opaque glazes can be found as blue-painted ware in Basra, dating to around the 8th century. Another contribution was the development of fritware, originating from 9th-century Iraq. Other centers for innovative ceramic pottery in the Old world included Fustat (from 975 to 1075), Damascus (from 1100 to around 1600) and Tabriz (from 1470 to 1550).

==== Literature ====
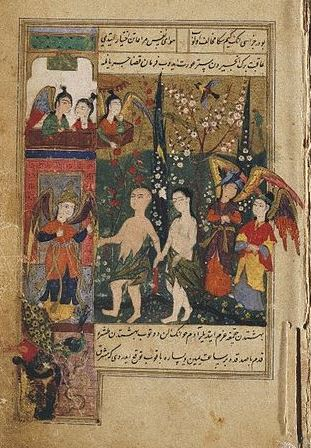
Hadiqatus-suada by Oghuz Turkic poet Fuzûlî

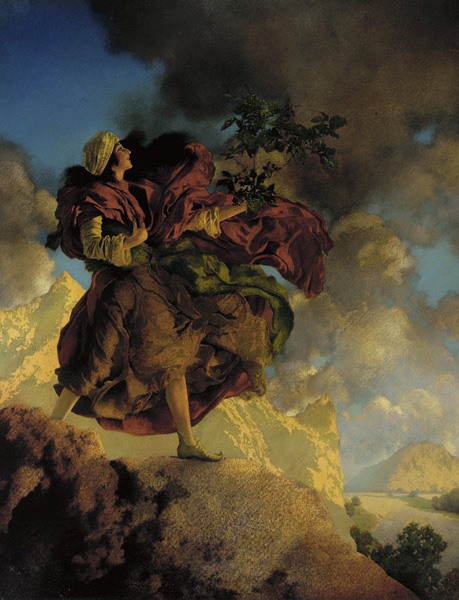
The story of Princess Parizade and the Magic Tree

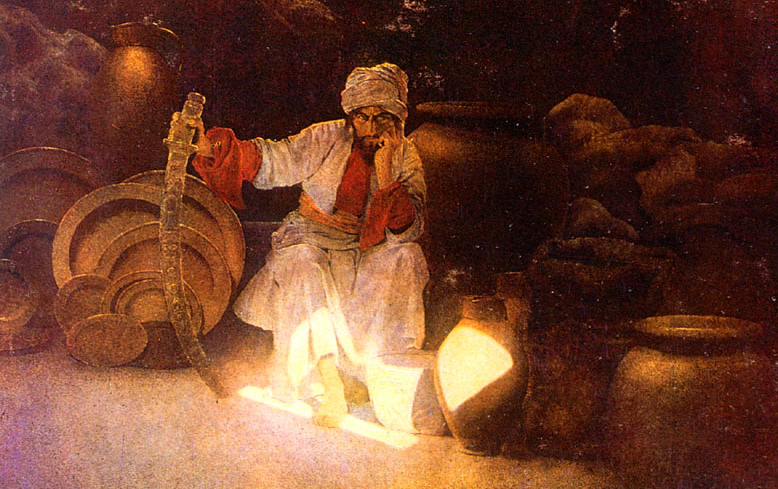
Cassim in the Cave by Maxfield Parrish

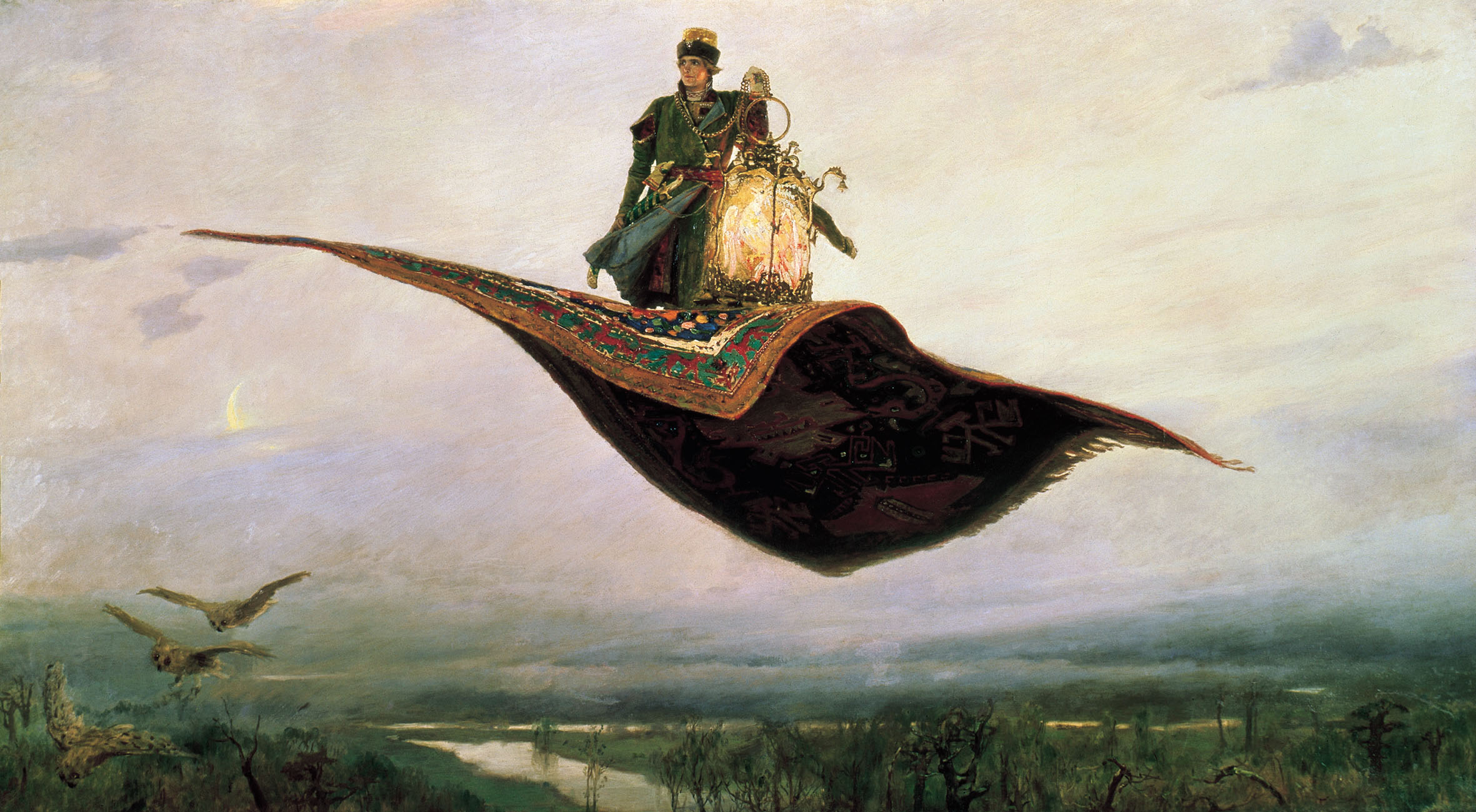
The Magic carpet

The best known work of fiction from the Islamic world is One Thousand and One Nights, a compilation of folk tales from Sanskrit, Persian, and later Arabian fables. The concept had been influenced by a pre-Islamic Persian prototype Hezār Afsān (Thousand Fables) that relied on particular Indian elements. It reached its final form by the 14th century; the number and type of tales have varied from one manuscript to another. This work has been very influential in the West since it was translated in the 18th century, first by Antoine Galland. Imitations were written, especially in France. Various characters from this epic have themselves become cultural icons in Western culture, such as Aladdin, Sinbad the Sailor and Ali Baba.

An example of Arabic poetry and Persian poetry on romance is Layla and Majnun, dating back to the Umayyad era in the 7th century. It is a tragic story of undying love. Ferdowsi's Shahnameh, the national epic of Greater Iran, is a mythical and heroic retelling of Persian history. Amir Arsalan was also a popular mythical Persian story.

Ibn Tufayl (Abubacer) and Ibn al-Nafis were pioneers of the philosophical novel. Ibn Tufail wrote the first Arabic novel Hayy ibn Yaqdhan (Philosophus Autodidactus) as a response to Al-Ghazali's The Incoherence of the Philosophers, and then Ibn al-Nafis also wrote a novel Theologus Autodidactus as a response to Ibn Tufail's Philosophus Autodidactus. Both of these narratives had protagonists (Hayy in Philosophus Autodidactus and Kamil in Theologus Autodidactus) who were autodidactic feral children living in seclusion on a desert island, both being the earliest examples of a desert island story. However, while Hayy lives alone with animals on the desert island for the rest of the story in Philosophus Autodidactus, the story of Kamil extends beyond the desert island setting in Theologus Autodidactus, developing into the earliest known coming of age plot and eventually becoming the first example of a science fiction novel.

Theologus Autodidactus, written by the Arabian polymath Ibn al-Nafis (1213–1288), deals with various science fiction elements such as spontaneous generation, futurology, the end of the world and doomsday, resurrection, and the afterlife. Rather than giving supernatural or mythological explanations for these events, Ibn al-Nafis attempted to explain these plot elements using the scientific knowledge of biology, astronomy, cosmology and geology known in his time. Ibn al-Nafis' fiction explained Islamic religious teachings via science and Islamic philosophy. Translations of Ibn Tufail's Philosophus Autodidactus appeared in Latin (1671), English (1708), German, and Dutch. These European-language translations may have later inspired Daniel Defoe's Robinson Crusoe and Robert Boyle's The Aspiring Naturalist.

==== Philosophy ====
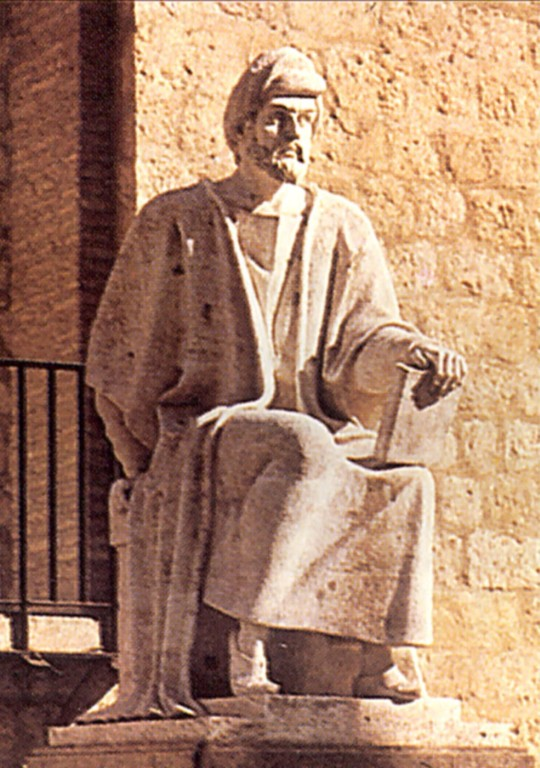
Ibn Rushd (Averroes), Muslim polymath from Al-Andalus

One of the common definitions for "Islamic philosophy" is "the style of philosophy produced within the framework of Islamic culture." Islamic philosophy, in this definition is neither necessarily concerned with religious issues, nor is exclusively produced by Muslims. The Persian scholar Ibn Sina (Avicenna) (980–1037) had more than 450 books attributed to him. His writings were concerned with various subjects, most notably philosophy and medicine. His medical textbook The Canon of Medicine was used as the standard text in European universities for centuries. He also wrote The Book of Healing, an influential scientific and philosophical encyclopedia.

Another figure from the Islamic Golden Age, Avicenna, also founded his own Avicennism school of philosophy, which was influential in both Islamic and Christian lands.

Yet another influential philosopher who had an influence on modern philosophy was Ibn Tufail. His philosophical novel, Hayy ibn Yaqdhan, translated into Latin as Philosophus Autodidactus in 1671, developed the themes of empiricism, tabula rasa, nature versus nurture, condition of possibility, materialism, and Molyneux's problem. European scholars and writers influenced by this novel include John Locke, Gottfried Leibniz, Melchisédech Thévenot, John Wallis, Christiaan Huygens, George Keith, Robert Barclay, the Quakers, and Samuel Hartlib.

Islamic philosophers continued making advances in philosophy through to the 17th century, when Mulla Sadra founded his school of Transcendent theosophy and developed the concept of existentialism.

Other influential Muslim philosophers include Ibn al-Haytham (Alhazen), a pioneer of phenomenology and the philosophy of science and a critic of Aristotelian natural philosophy and Aristotle's concept of place (topos); Al-Biruni, a critic of Aristotelian natural philosophy; Ibn al-Nafis, a pioneer of the philosophical novel; Shahab al-Din Suhrawardi, founder of Illuminationist philosophy; Fakhr al-Din al-Razi, a critic of Aristotelian logic and a pioneer of inductive logic; and Ibn Khaldun, a pioneer in the philosophy of history.

==== Sciences ====
Sciences

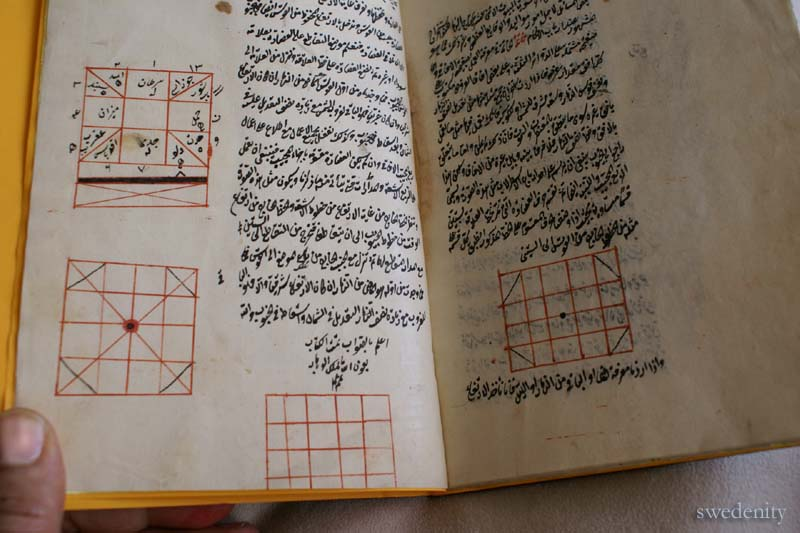
Nasir al-Din al-Tusi's Astrolabe (13th century)

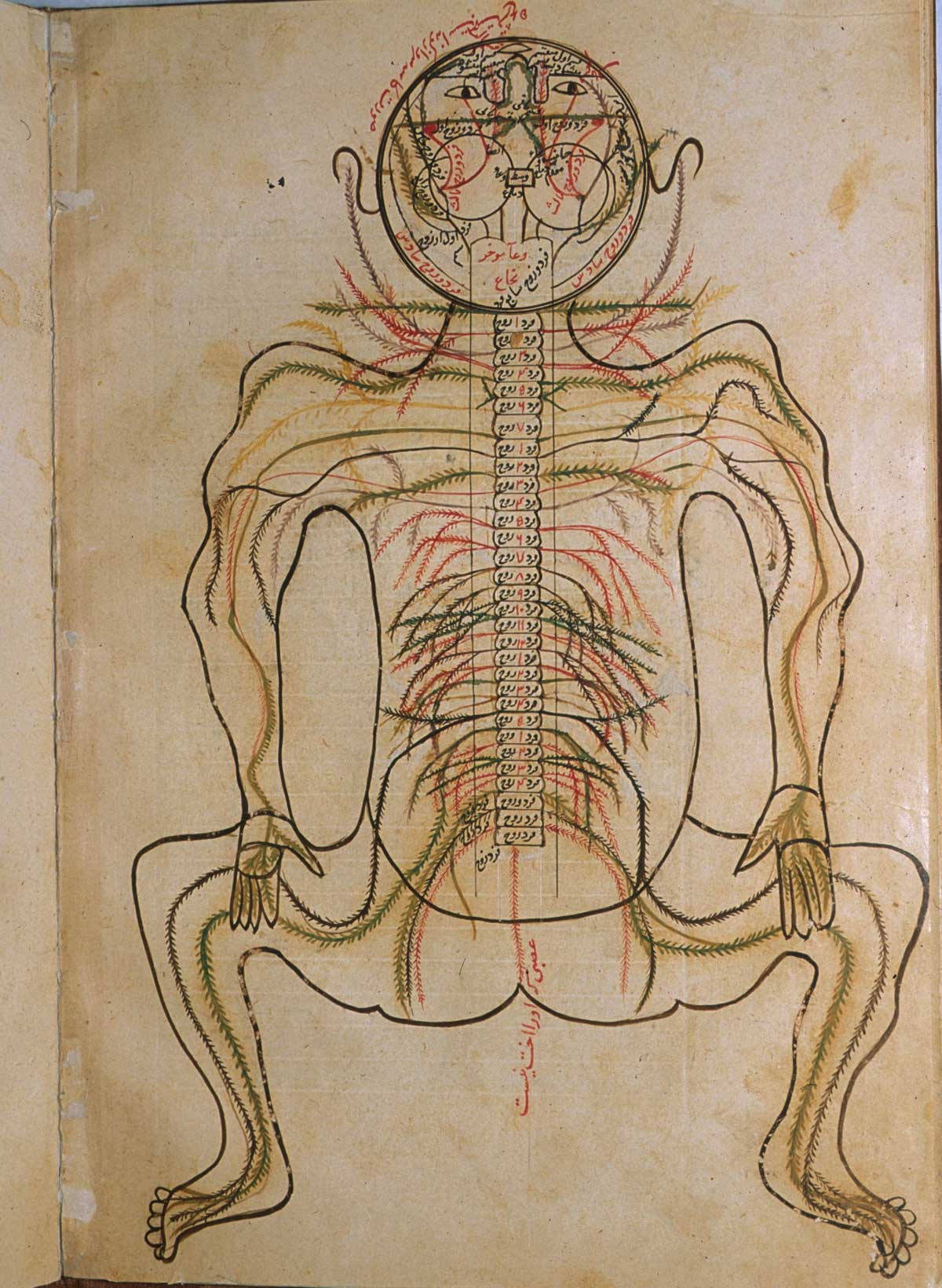
One of Mansur ibn Ilyas (Ak Koyunlu era) colored illustrations of human anatomy

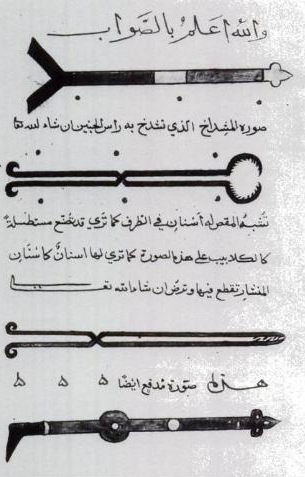
Abu al-Qasim al-Zahrawi's Kitab al-Tasrif
surgical instruments illustrations (11th century)

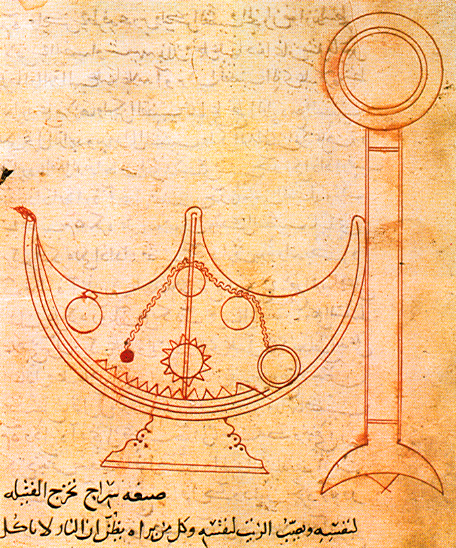
A self-trimming lamp from Banū Mūsā's work On Mechanical Devices on Automation

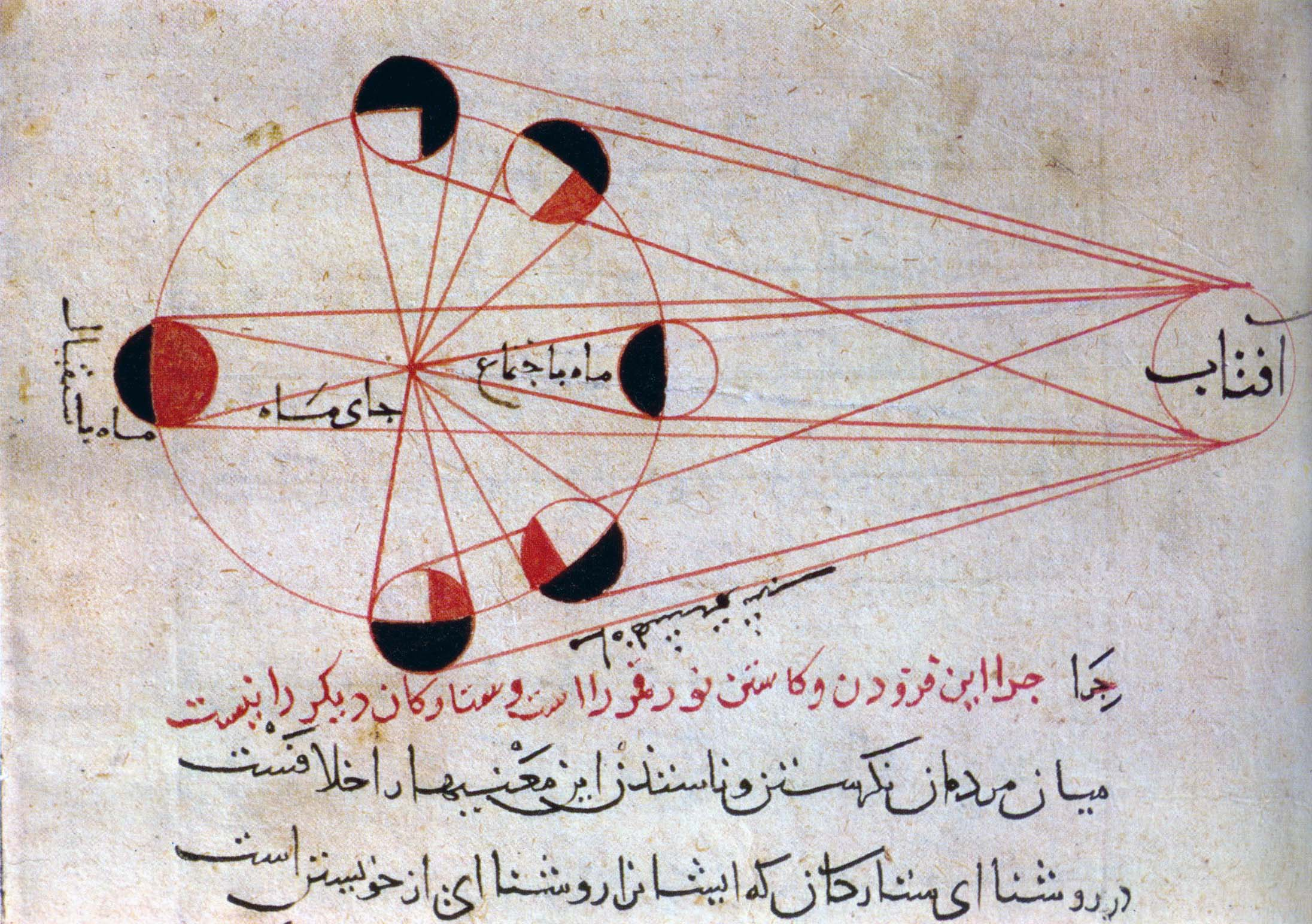
An illustration from al-Biruni's astronomical works, explains the different phases of the moon.

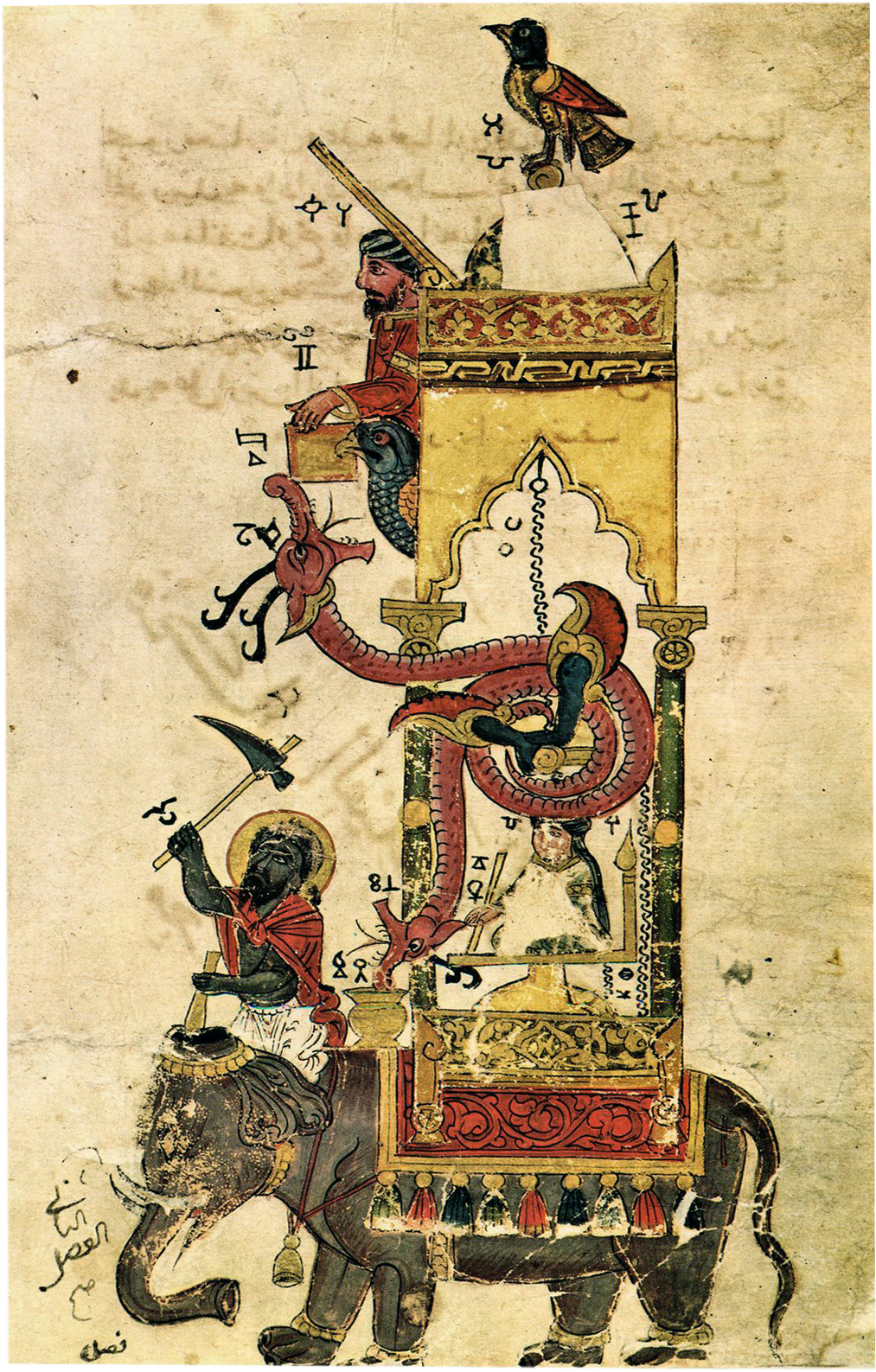
The Elephant Clock was one of the most famous inventions of Al-Jazari.

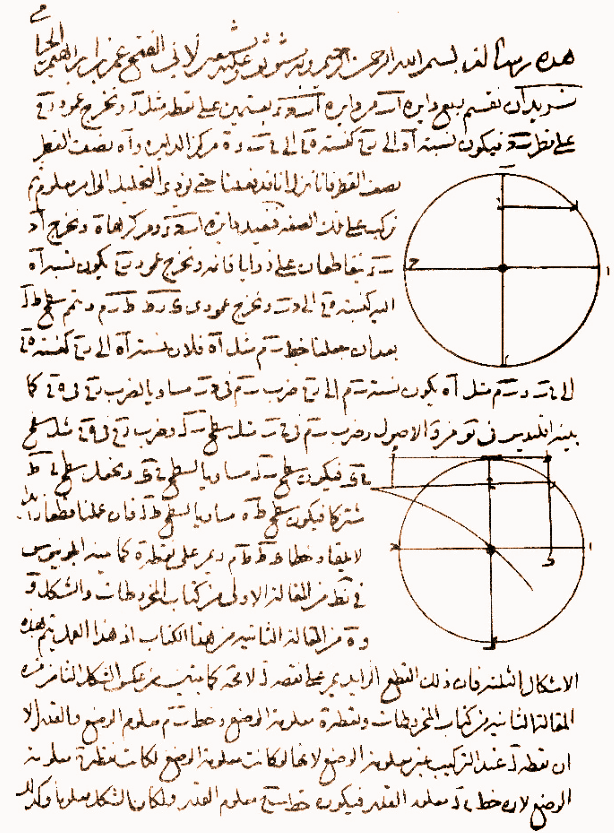
"Cubic equations and intersections of conic sections", of Omar Khayyam

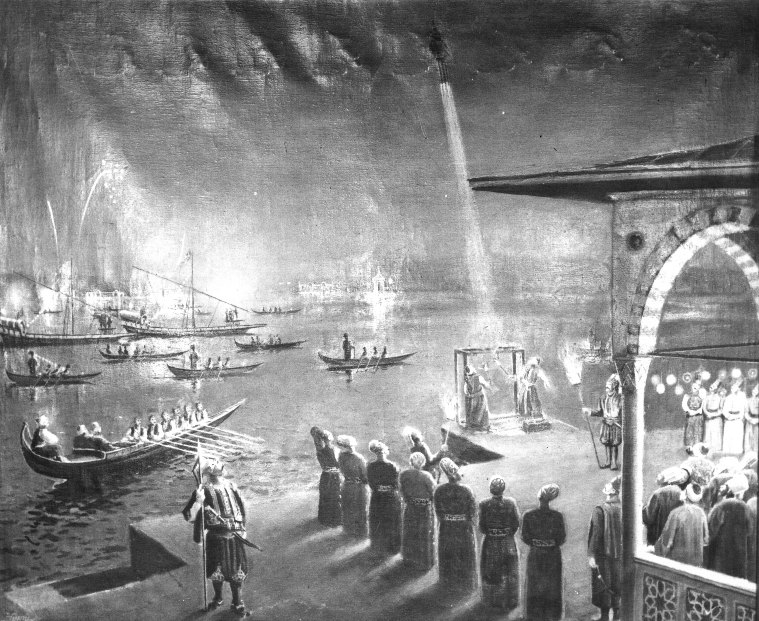
Lagâri Hasan Çelebi's rocket flight depicted in a 17th-century engraving

Ibn al-Haytham is also regarded as the father of optics, especially for his empirical proof of the intromission theory of light. Jim Al-Khalili stated in 2009 that Ibn al-Haytham is 'often referred to as the "world's first true scientist".' al-Khwarzimi's invented the log base systems that are being used today, he also contributed theorems in trigonometry as well as limits. Recent studies show that it is very likely that the Medieval Muslim artists were aware of advanced decagonal quasicrystal geometry (discovered half a millennium later in the 1970s and 1980s in the West) and used it in intricate decorative tilework in the architecture.

Muslim physicians contributed to the field of medicine, including the subjects of anatomy and physiology: such as in the 15th-century Persian work by Mansur ibn Muhammad ibn al-Faqih Ilyas entitled Tashrih al-badan (Anatomy of the body) which contained comprehensive diagrams of the body's structural, nervous and circulatory systems; or in the work of the Egyptian physician Ibn al-Nafis, who proposed the theory of pulmonary circulation. Abu al-Qasim al-Zahrawi (also known as Abulcasis) contributed to the discipline of medical surgery with his Kitab al-Tasrif ("Book of Concessions"), a medical encyclopedia which was later translated to Latin and used in European and Muslim medical schools for centuries. Other medical advancements came in the fields of pharmacology and pharmacy.

Some most famous scientists from the medieval Islamic world include Jābir ibn Hayyān, al-Farabi, Abu al-Qasim al-Zahrawi, Ibn al-Haytham, Al-Biruni, Avicenna, Nasir al-Din al-Tusi, and Ibn Khaldun.

==== Technology ====
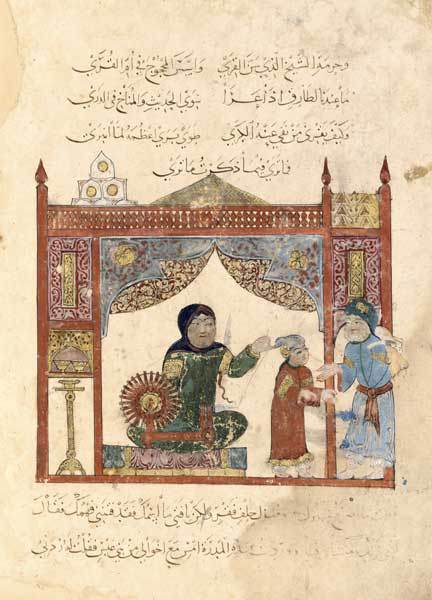
The Spinning wheel is believed to have been invented in the medieval era (of what is now the Greater Middle East), it is considered to be an important device that contributed greatly to the advancement of the Industrial Revolution. (Scene from Al-Maqamat, painted by al-Wasiti 1237)

In technology, the Muslim world adopted papermaking from China. The knowledge of gunpowder was also transmitted from China via predominantly Islamic countries.

Advances were made in irrigation and farming, using new technology such as the windmill. Crops such as almonds and citrus fruit were brought to Europe through al-Andalus, and sugar cultivation was gradually adopted by the Europeans. Arab merchants dominated trade in the Indian Ocean until the arrival of the Portuguese in the 16th century. Hormuz was an important center for this trade. There was also a dense network of trade routes in the Mediterranean, along which Muslim-majority countries traded with each other and with European powers such as Venice, Genoa and Catalonia (see also: Indo-Mediterranean). The Silk Road crossing Central Asia passed through Islamic states between China and Europe. The emergence of major economic empires with technological resources after the conquests of Timur (Tamerlane) and the resurgence of the Timurid Renaissance include the Mali Empire and the Bengal Sultanate in particular, a major global trading nation in the world, described by the Europeans to be the "richest country to trade with".

Muslim engineers in the Islamic world made a number of innovative industrial uses of hydropower, and early industrial uses of tidal power and wind power. The industrial uses of watermills in the Islamic world date back to the 7th century, while horizontal-wheeled and vertical-wheeled water mills were both in widespread use since at least the 9th century. A variety of industrial mills were being employed in the Islamic world, including early fulling mills, gristmills, paper mills, hullers, sawmills, ship mills, stamp mills, steel mills, sugar mills, tide mills and windmills. By the 11th century, every province throughout the Islamic world had these industrial mills in operation, from al-Andalus and North Africa to the Middle East and Central Asia. Muslim engineers also invented crankshafts and water turbines, employed gears in mills and water-raising machines, and pioneered the use of dams as a source of water power, used to provide additional power to watermills and water-raising machines. Such advances made it possible for industrial tasks that were previously driven by manual labour in ancient times to be mechanized and driven by machinery instead in the medieval Islamic world. The transfer of these technologies to medieval Europe had an influence on the Industrial Revolution, particularly from the proto-industrialised Mughal Bengal and Tipu Sultan's Kingdom, through the conquests of the East India Company.

=== Arts ===
The term "Islamic art and architecture" denotes the works of art and architecture produced from the 7th century onwards by people who lived within the territory that was inhabited by culturally Islamic populations.

==== Architecture ====
Islamic architecture comprises the architectural styles of buildings associated with Islamic civilization. It encompasses both secular and religious styles from the early history of Islam to the present day. The Islamic world encompasses a wide geographic area historically ranging from Western Africa and Europe to Eastern Asia. Certain commonalities are shared by Islamic architectural styles across all these regions, but over time different regions developed their own styles according to local materials and techniques, local dynasties and patrons, different regional centers of artistic production, and sometimes different religious affiliations.

Early Islamic architecture was influenced by Roman, Byzantine, Iranian, and Mesopotamian architecture and all other lands which the early Muslim conquests conquered in the seventh and eighth centuries. Later it developed distinct characteristics in the form of buildings and in the decoration of surfaces with Islamic calligraphy, arabesques, and geometric motifs. New architectural elements like minarets, muqarnas, and multifoil arches were invented. Common or important types of buildings in Islamic architecture include mosques, madrasas, tombs, palaces, hammams (public baths), Sufi hospices (e.g. khanqahs or zawiyas), fountains and sabils, commercial buildings (e.g. caravanserais and bazaars), and military fortifications.

Building with islamic architecture

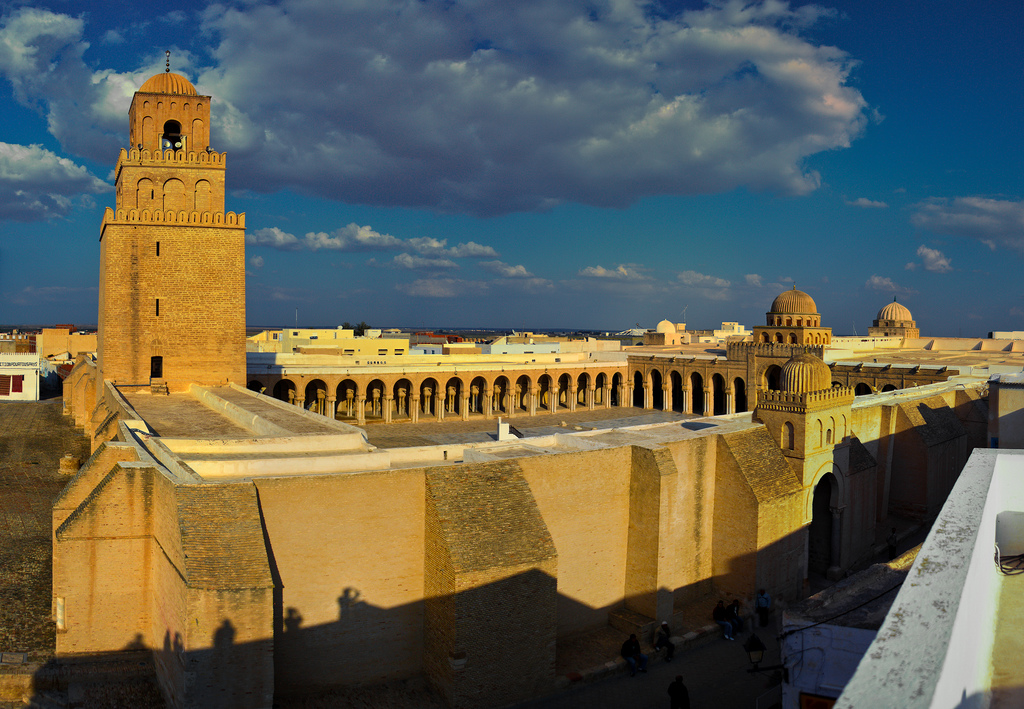
Great Mosque of Kairouan, Kairouan, Tunisia

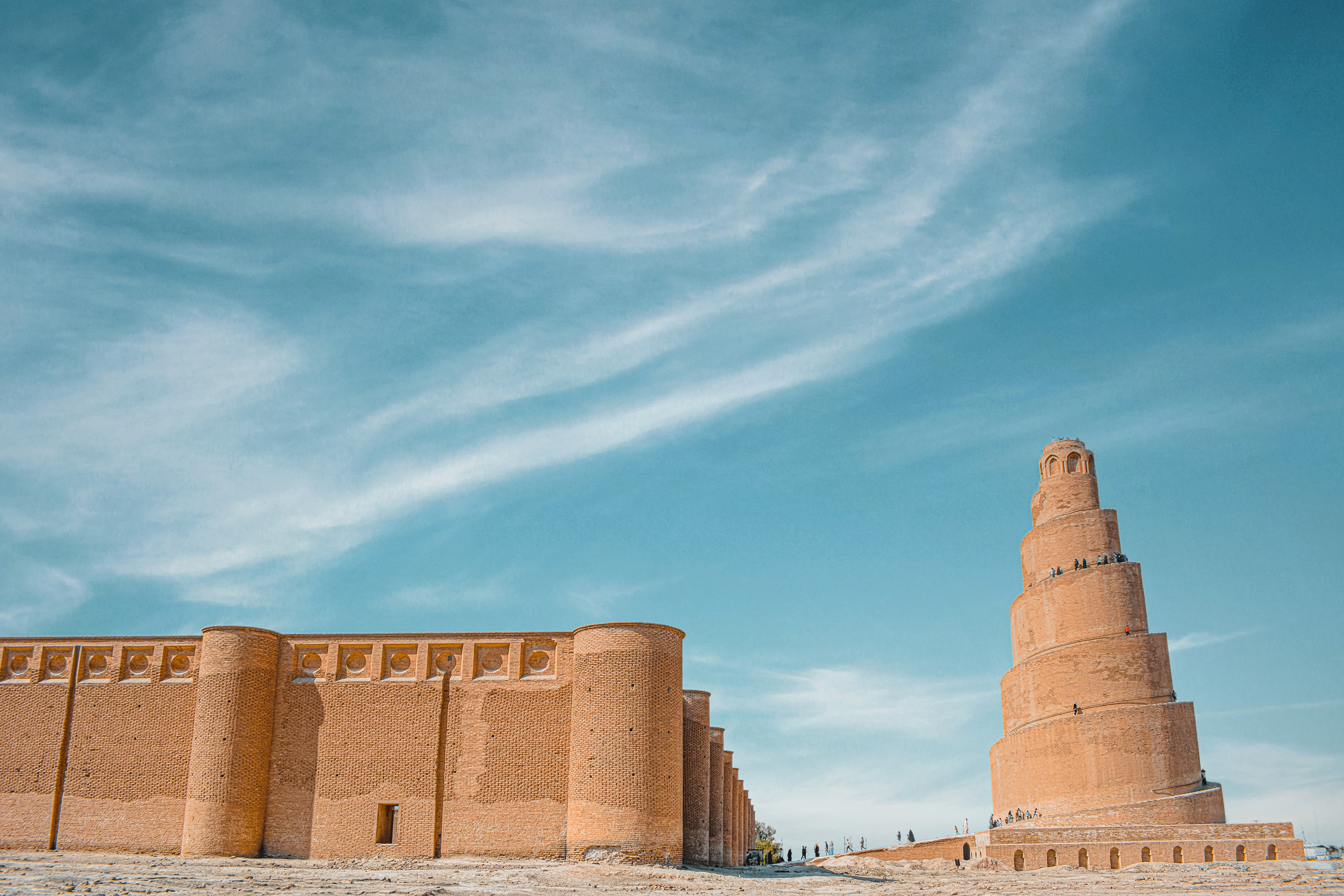
Great Mosque of Samarra, Samarra, Iraq

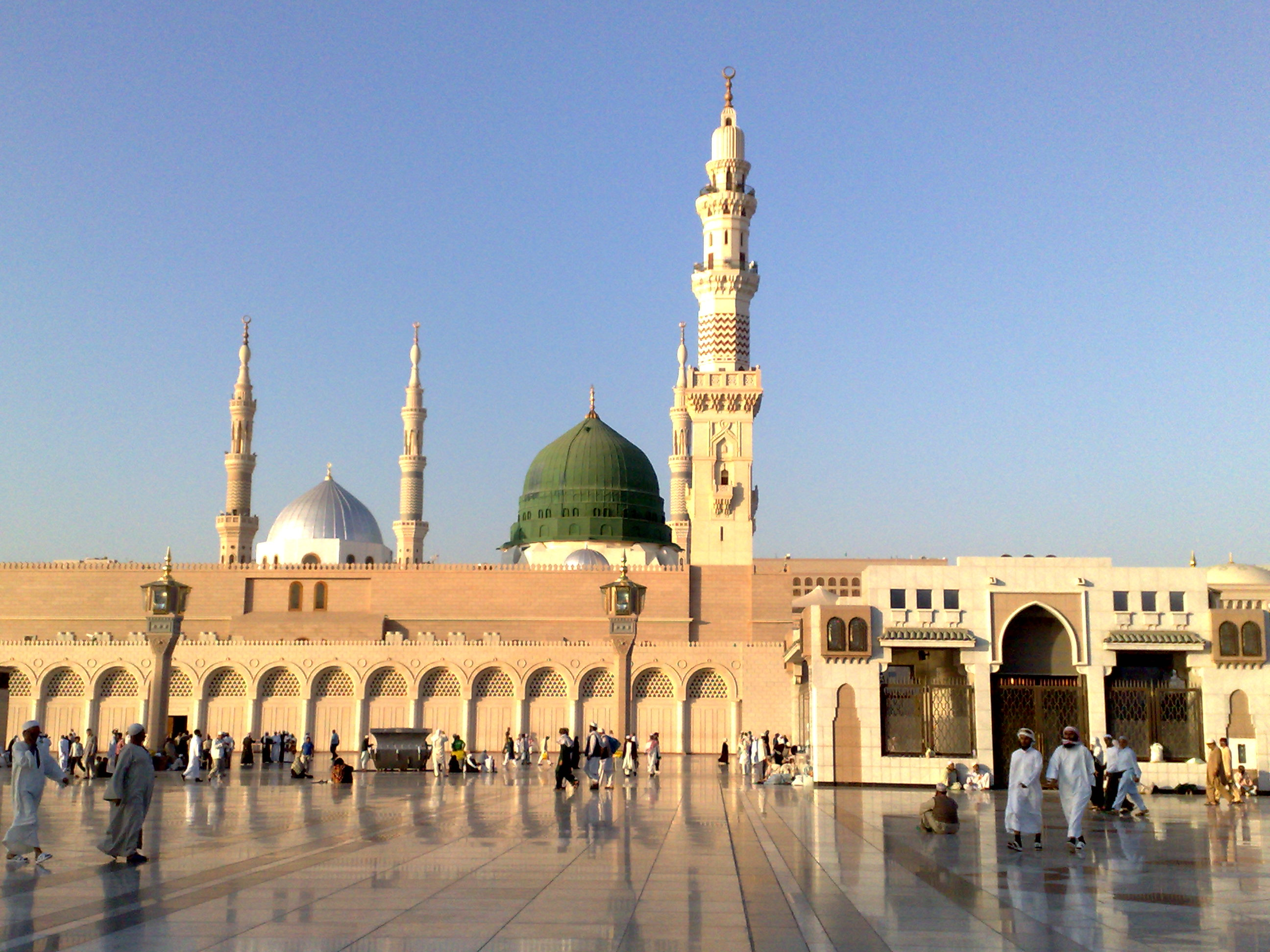
Prophet's Mosque, Medina, Saudi Arabia

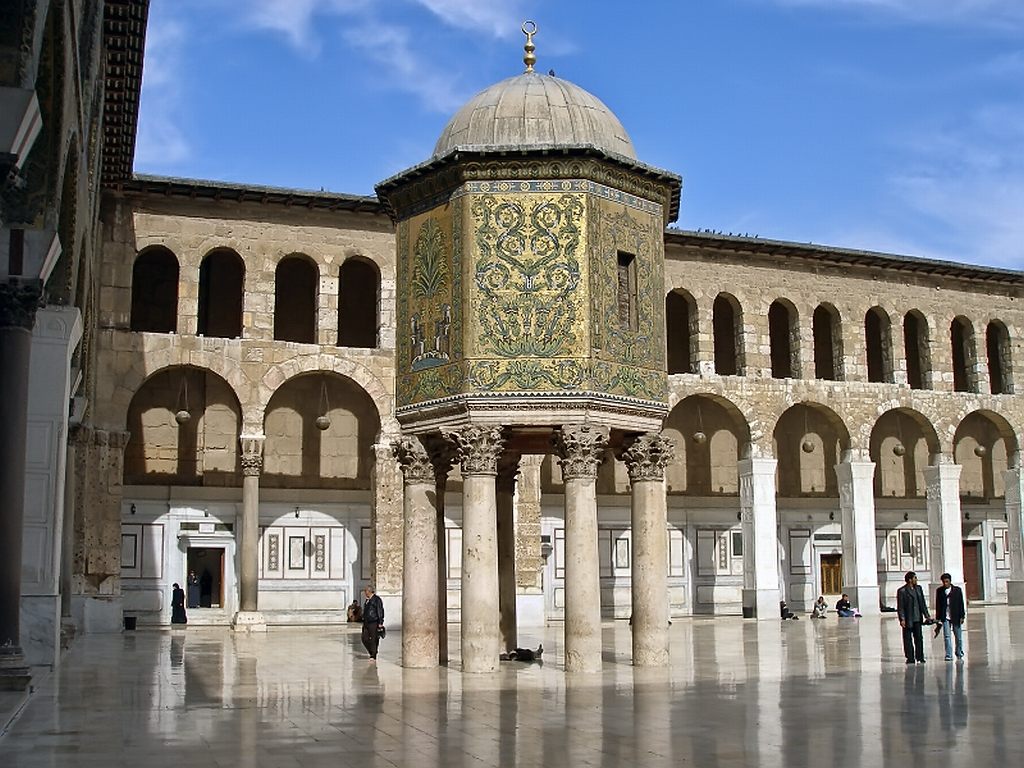
Umayyad Mosque, Damascus, Syria

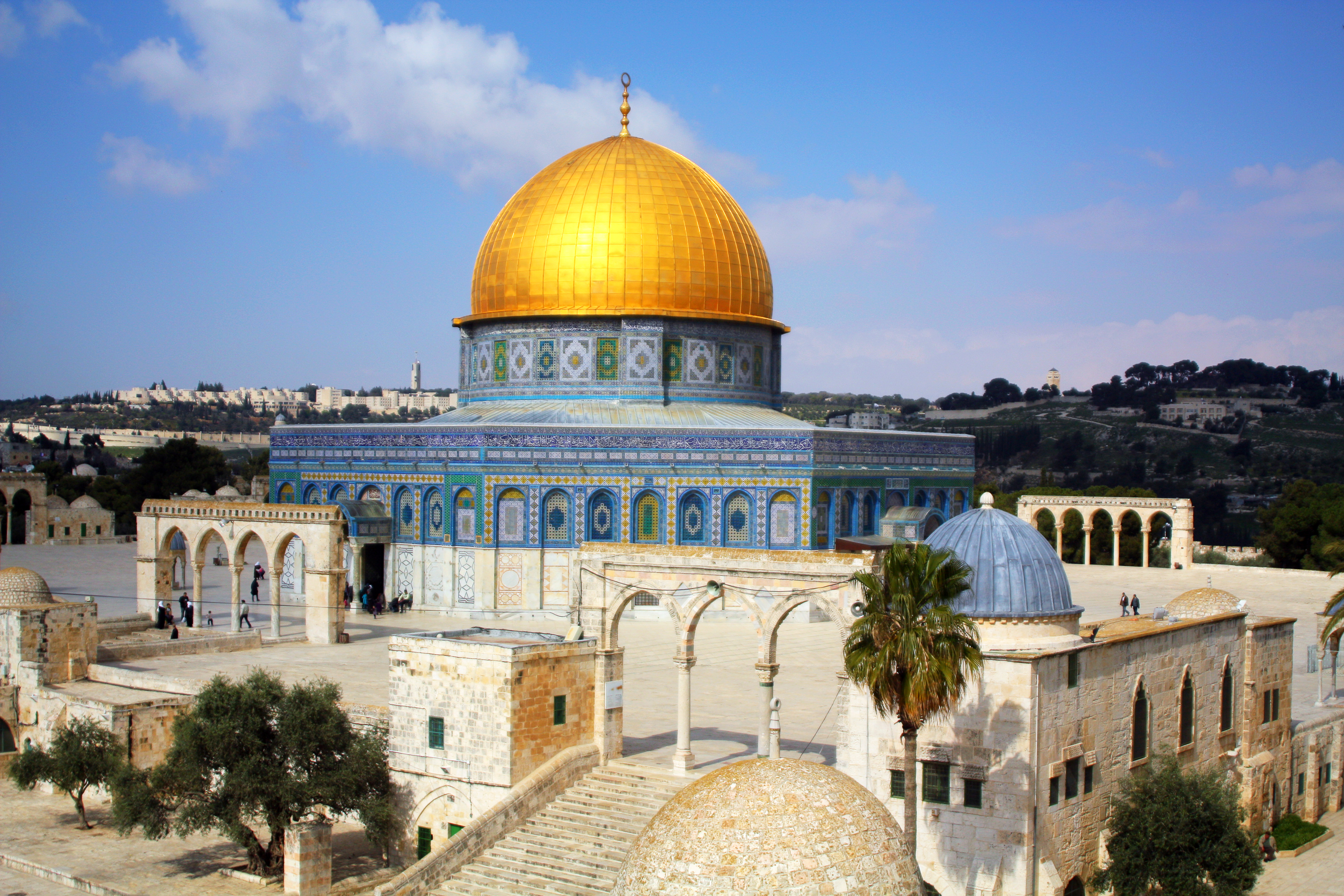
Dome of the Rock in Jerusalem

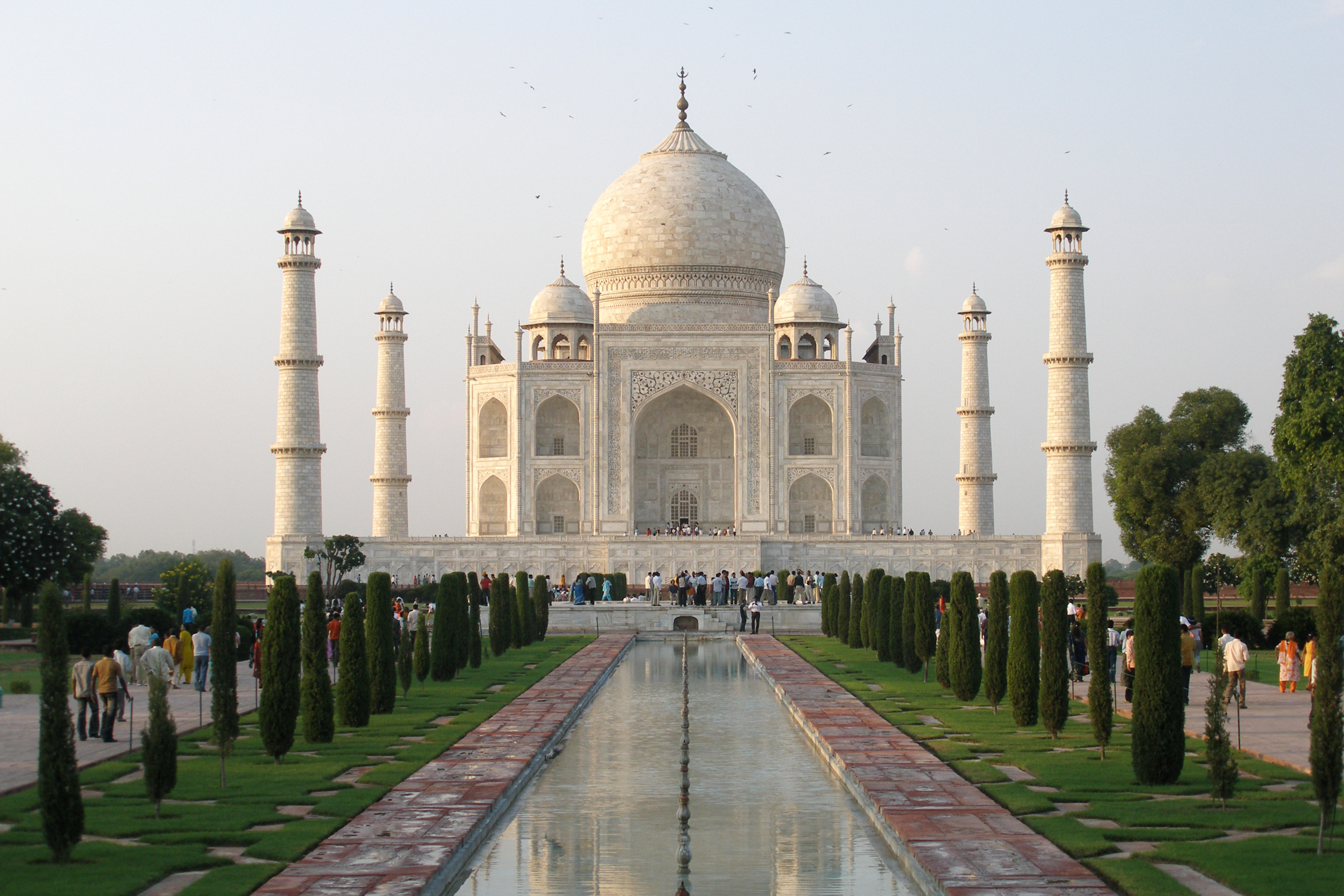
Taj Mahal in Agra city of India was constructed during the Mughal Empire

Istiqlal Mosque in Jakarta, Indonesia

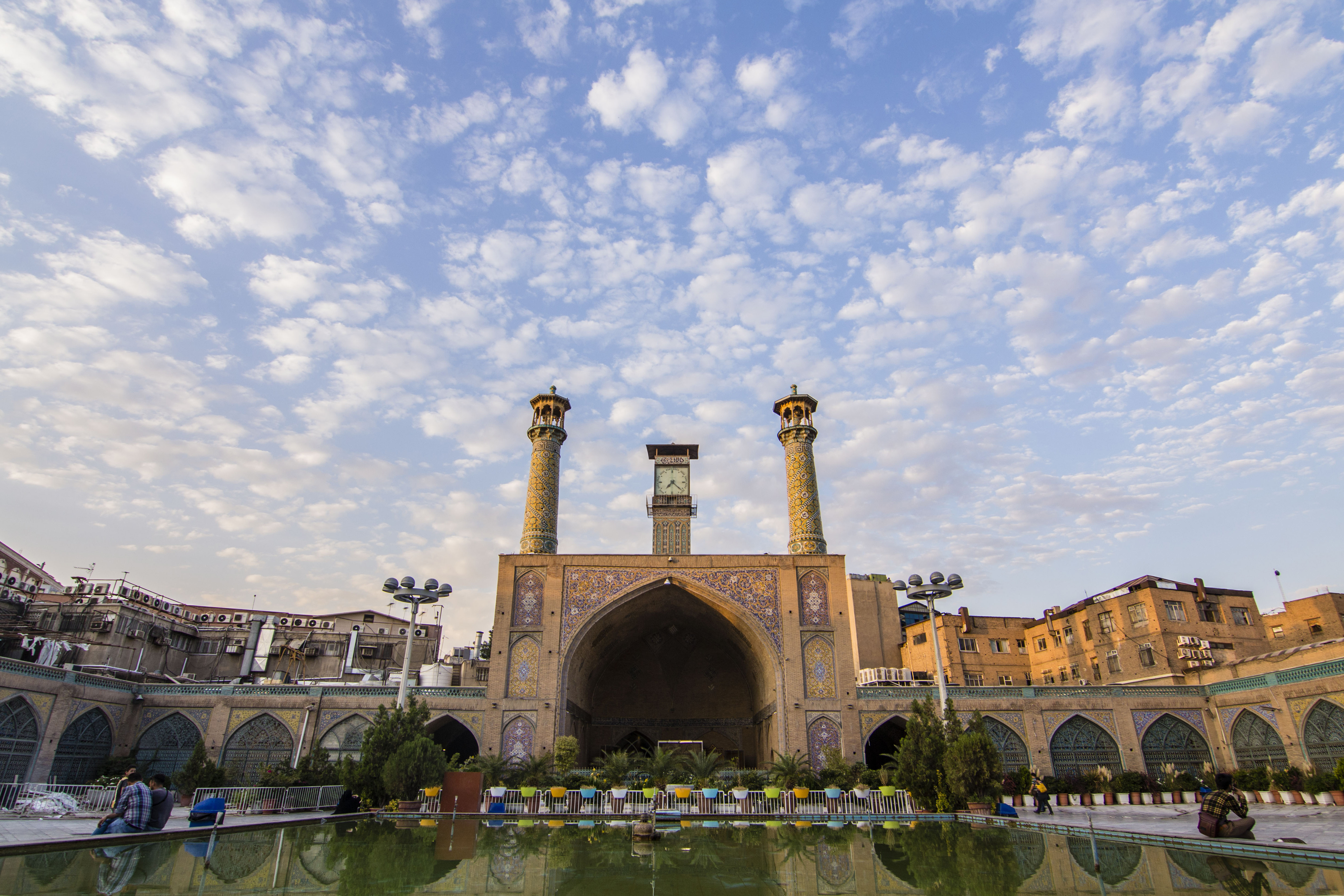
Shah Mosque in Tehran, Iran

Hagia Sophia a journey from church to mosque, embodying centuries of history and faith in Istanbul, Turkey

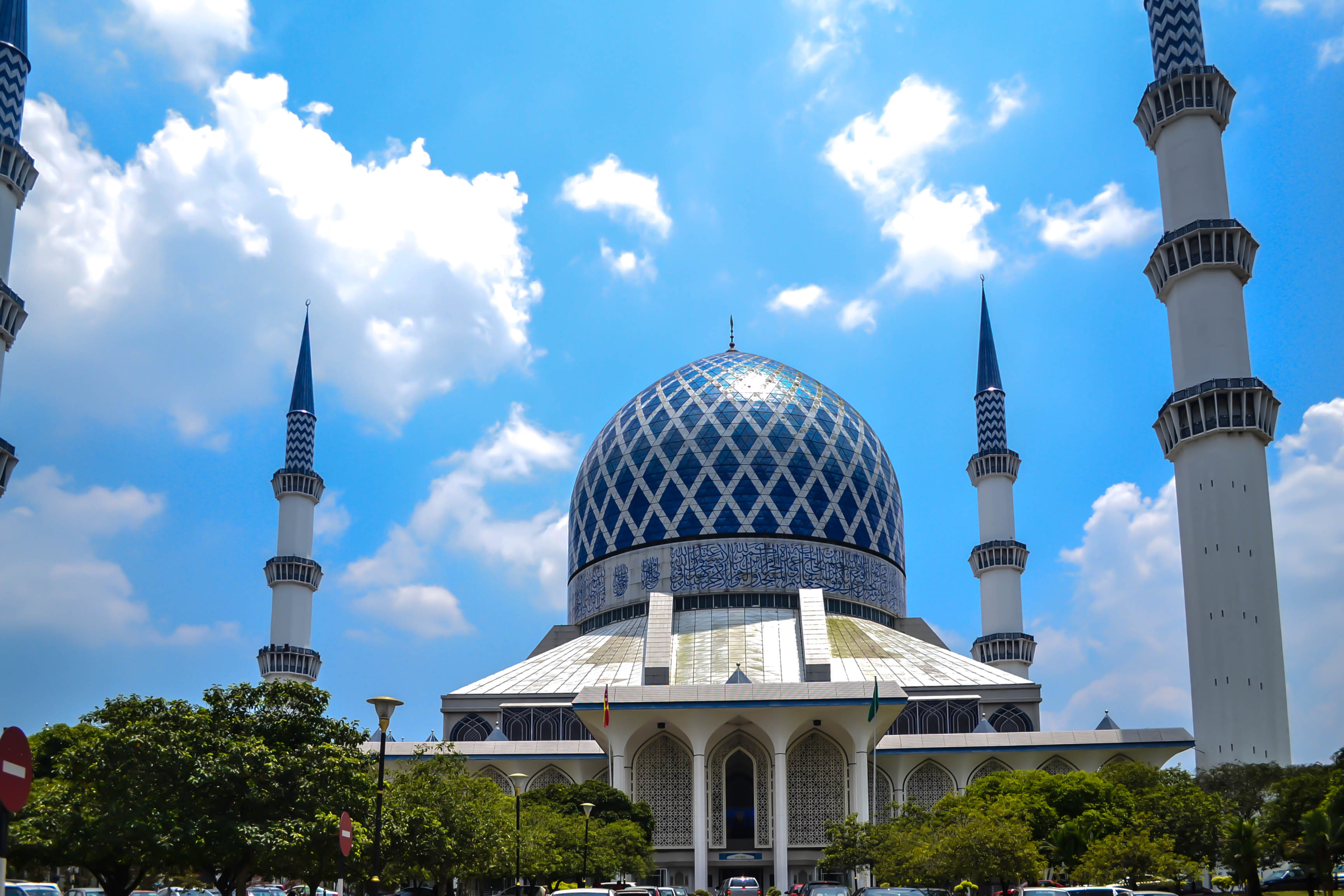
Sultan Salahuddin Abdul Aziz Mosque in Selangor, Malaysia

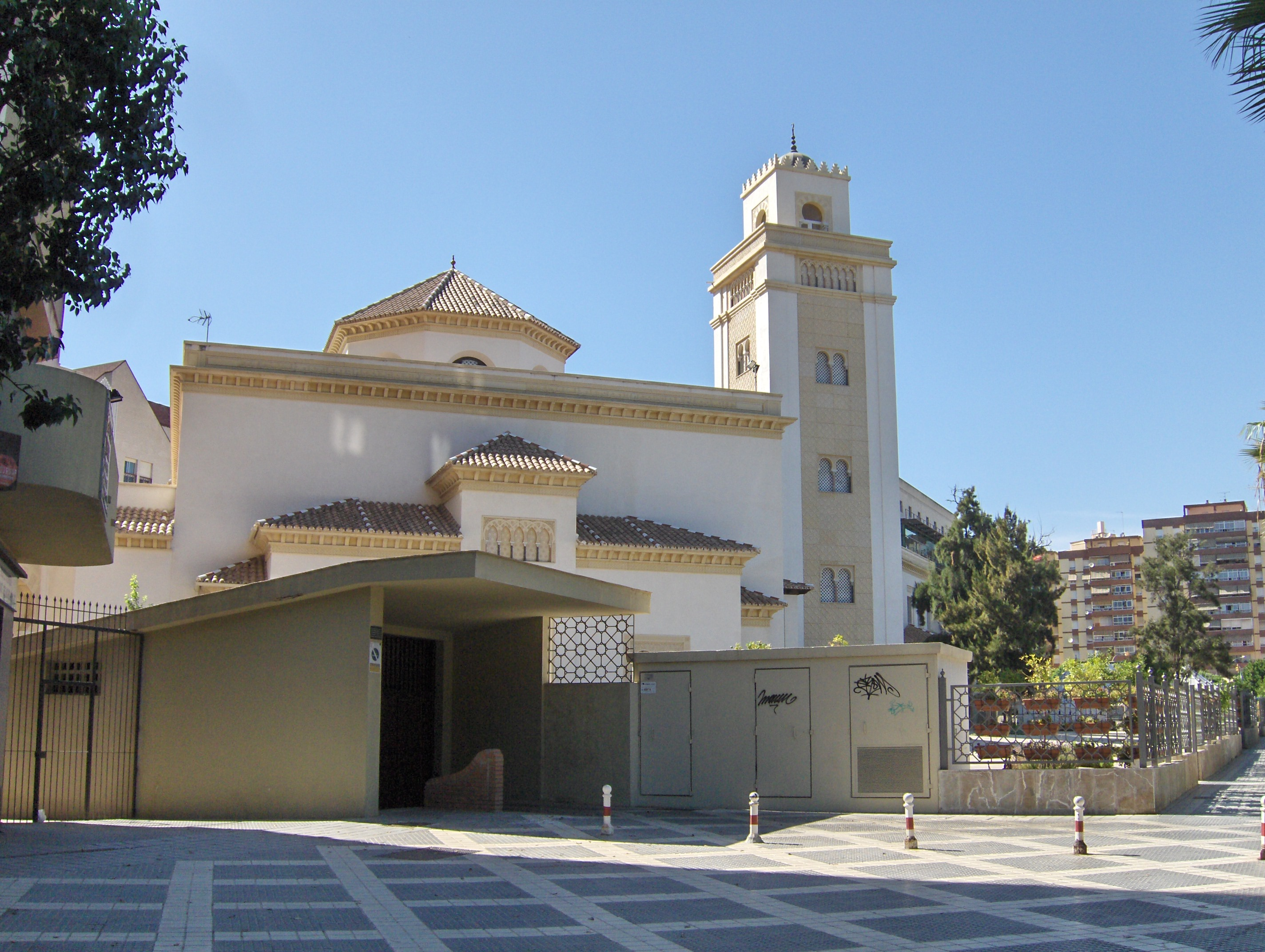
Al-Andalus Mosque with a Moorish-style mosque in Andalusia, Spain

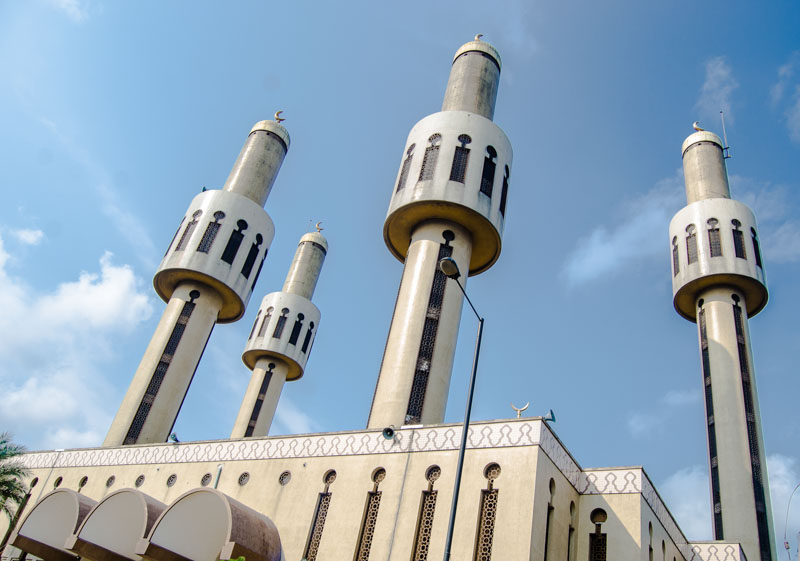
Lagos Central Mosque in Lagos, Nigeria

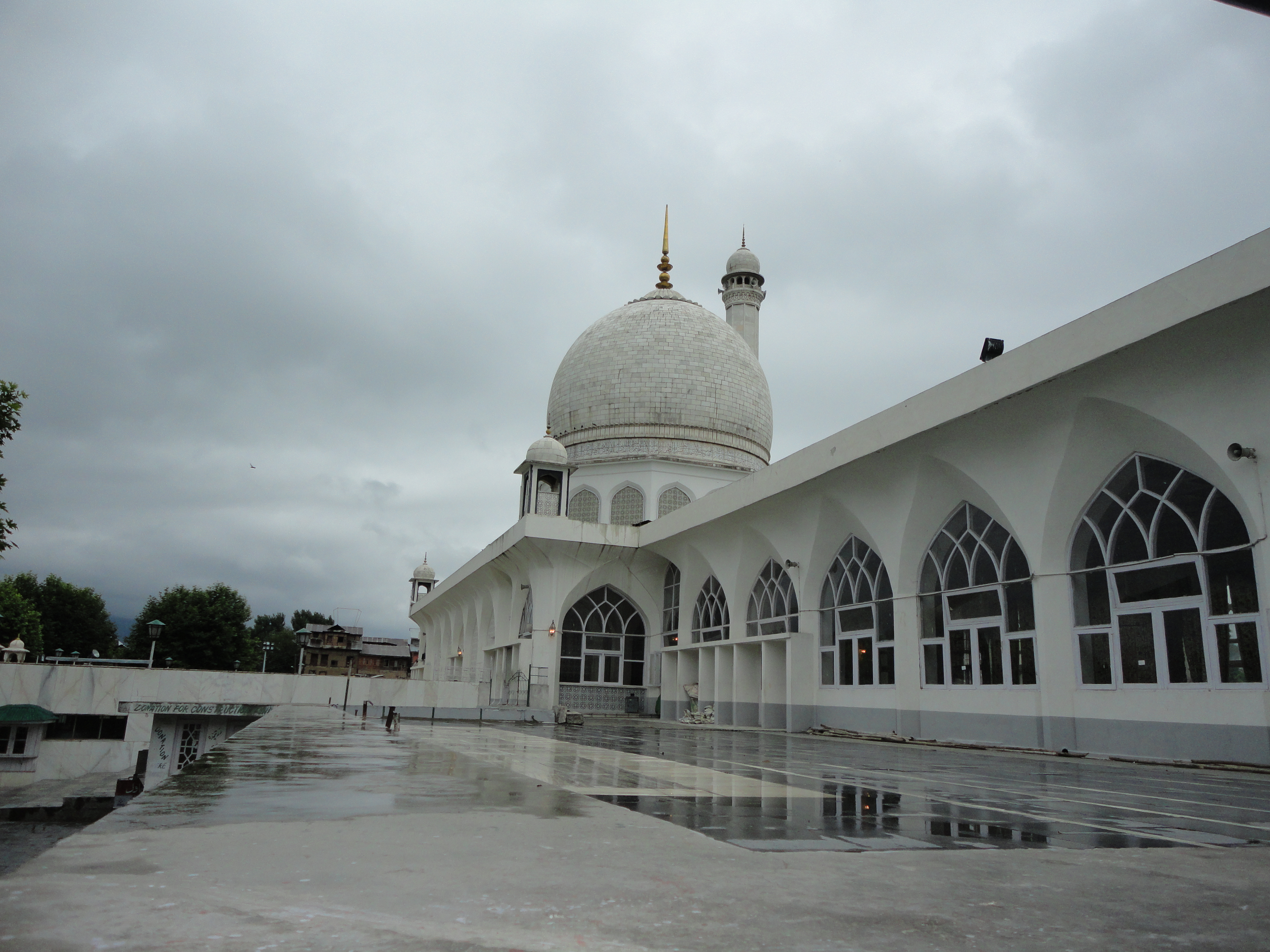
The Hazratbal Shrine in Jammu and Kashmir, India

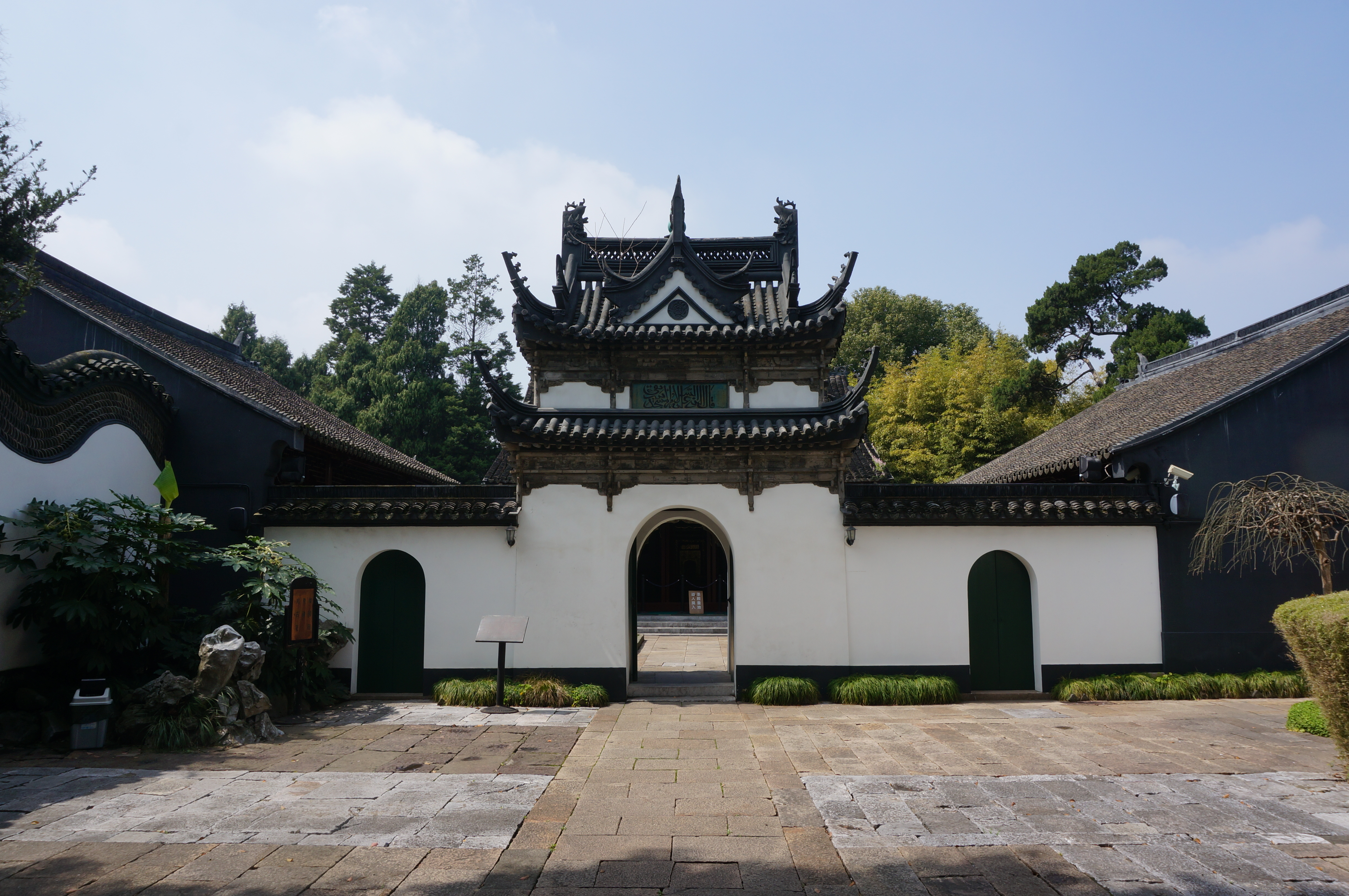
Entrance of Songjiang Mosque with Chinese Islamic architecture in Shanghai, China

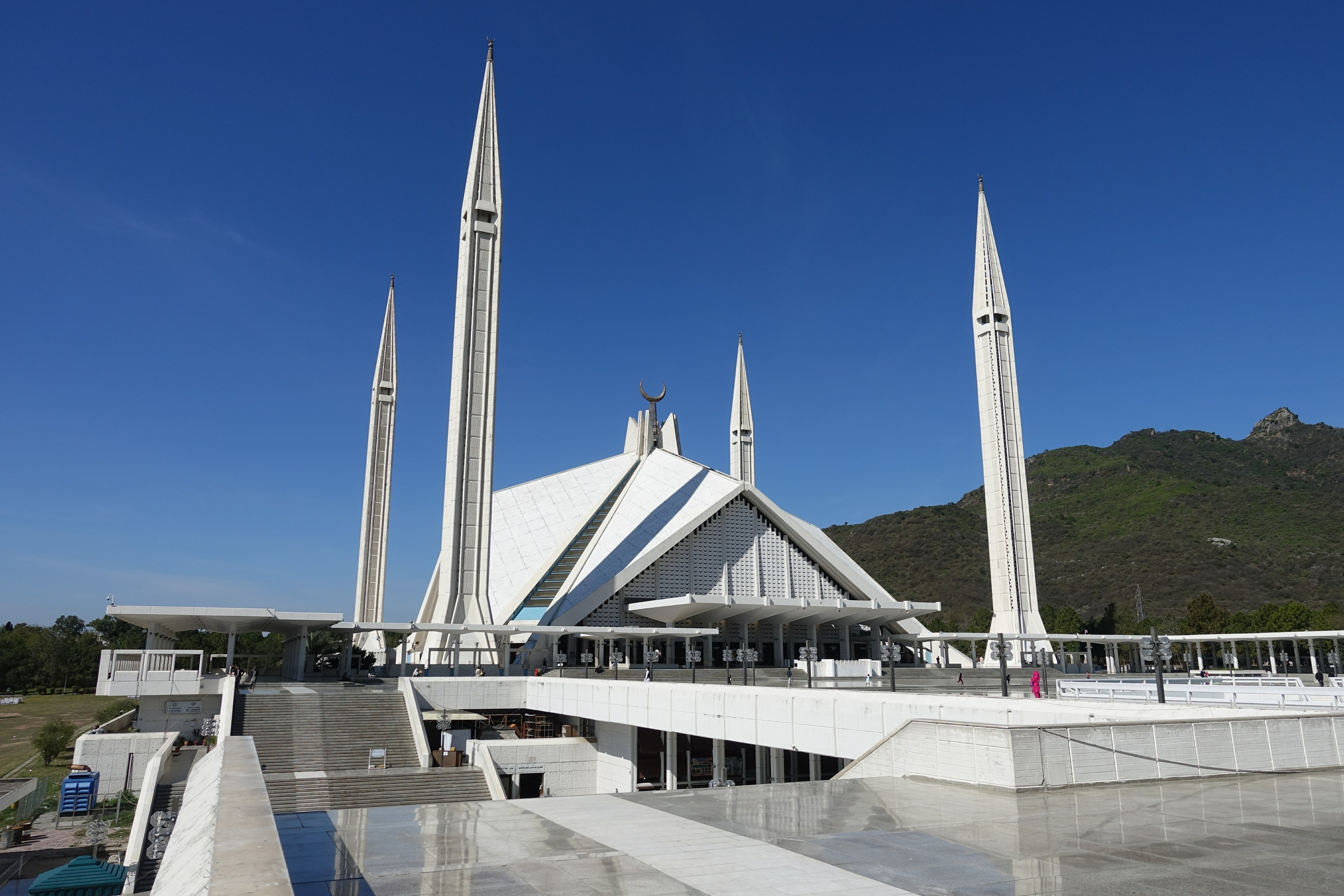
The design of Faisal Mosque in Islamabad, Pakistan, is inspired by Bedouin's tent.

Astana Grand Mosque is the largest mosque in Central Asia in Astana, Kazakhstan

==== Aniconism ====
No Islamic visual images or depictions of God are meant to exist because it is believed that such artistic depictions may lead to idolatry. Muslims describe God by the names and attributes that, according to Islam, he revealed to his creation. All but one sura of the Quran begins with the phrase "In the name of God, the Beneficent, the Merciful". Images of Mohammed are likewise prohibited. Such aniconism and iconoclasm can also be found in Jewish and some Christian theology.

==== Arabesque ====
Islamic art frequently adopts the use of geometrical floral or vegetal designs in a repetition known as arabesque. Such designs are highly nonrepresentational, as Islam forbids representational depictions as found in pre-Islamic pagan religions. Despite this, there is a presence of depictional art in some Muslim societies, notably the miniature style made famous in Persia and under the Ottoman Empire which featured paintings of people and animals, and also depictions of Quranic stories and Islamic traditional narratives. Another reason why Islamic art is usually abstract is to symbolize the transcendence, indivisible and infinite nature of God, an objective achieved by arabesque. Islamic calligraphy is an omnipresent decoration in Islamic art, and is usually expressed in the form of Quranic verses. Two of the main scripts involved are the symbolic kufic and naskh scripts, which can be found adorning the walls and domes of mosques, the sides of minbars, and so on.

Distinguishing motifs of Islamic architecture have always been ordered repetition, radiating structures, and rhythmic, metric patterns. In this respect, fractal geometry has been a key utility, especially for mosques and palaces. Other features employed as motifs include columns, piers and arches, organized and interwoven with alternating sequences of niches and colonnettes. The role of domes in Islamic architecture has been considerable. Its usage spans centuries, first appearing in 691 with the construction of the Dome of the Rock mosque, and recurring even up until the 17th century with the Taj Mahal. And as late as the 19th century, Islamic domes had been incorporated into European architecture.

Example of an Arabesque

Example of an Arabesque

Example of an Arabesque

==== Girih ====
Girih (Persian: گره, "knot", also written gereh) are decorative Islamic geometric patterns used in architecture and handicraft objects, consisting of angled lines that form an interlaced strapwork pattern.

Girih decoration is believed to have been inspired by Syrian Roman knotwork patterns from the second century. However, its mathematical patterns, structured around multiple lines of symmetry, are based on innovations in mathematics that occurred in the Islamic world after the ninth century. The earliest girih dates from around 1000 CE, and the artform flourished until the 15th century. Girih patterns can be created in a variety of ways, including the traditional straightedge and compass construction; the construction of a grid of polygons; and the use of a set of girih tiles with lines drawn on them: the lines form the pattern. Patterns may be elaborated by the use of two levels of design, as at the 1453 Darb-e Imam shrine. Square repeating units of known patterns can be copied as templates, and historic pattern books may have been intended for use in this way.

The 15th century Topkapı Scroll explicitly shows girih patterns together with the tilings used to create them. A set of tiles consisting of a dart and a kite shape can be used to create aperiodic Penrose tilings, though there is no evidence that such a set was used in medieval times. Girih patterns have been used to decorate varied materials including stone screens, as at Fatehpur Sikri; plasterwork, as at mosques and madrasas such as the Hunat Hatun Complex in Kayseri; metal, as at Mosque-Madrassa of Sultan Hassan in Cairo; and in wood, as at the Mosque–Cathedral of Córdoba.

Girih tiles

The subdivision rule used to generate the Girih pattern on the spandrel

Girih pattern that can be drawn with compass and straight edge

==== Islamic calligraphy ====
Islamic calligraphy is the artistic practice of penmanship and calligraphy, in the languages which use the Arabic alphabet or the alphabets derived from it. It is a highly stylized and structured form of handwriting that follows artistic conventions and is often used for Islamic religious texts, architecture, and decoration. It includes Arabic, Persian, Ottoman, and Urdu calligraphy. It is known in Arabic as khatt Arabi (خط عربي), literally meaning "line", "design", or "construction".

The development of Islamic calligraphy is strongly tied to the Quran, as chapters and verses from the Quran are a common and almost universal text upon which Islamic calligraphy is based. Although artistic depictions of people and animals are not explicitly forbidden in the Quran, Islamic traditions have often limited figural representation in Islamic religious texts in order to avoid idolatry. Some scholars argue that Kufic script was developed by the late 7th century in Kufa, Iraq, from which it takes its name. This early style later evolved into several forms, including floral, foliated, plaited or interlaced, bordered, and square Kufic. In the ancient world, though, artists sometimes circumvented aniconic prohibitions by creating intricate calligraphic compositions that formed shapes and figures using tiny script. Calligraphy was a valued art form, and was regarded as both an aesthetic and moral pursuit. An ancient Arabic proverb illustrates this point by emphatically stating that "purity of writing is purity of the soul."

Beyond religious contexts, Islamic calligraphy is widely used in secular art, architecture, and decoration. Its prominence in Islamic art is not solely due to religious constraints on figurative imagery, but rather reflects the central role of writing and the written word in Islamic culture. Islamic calligraphy evolved primarily from two major styles: Kufic and Naskh, with numerous regional and stylistic variations. In the modern era, Arabic and Persian calligraphy have influenced modern art, particularly in the post-colonial Middle East, and have also inspired the fusion style known as calligraffiti.

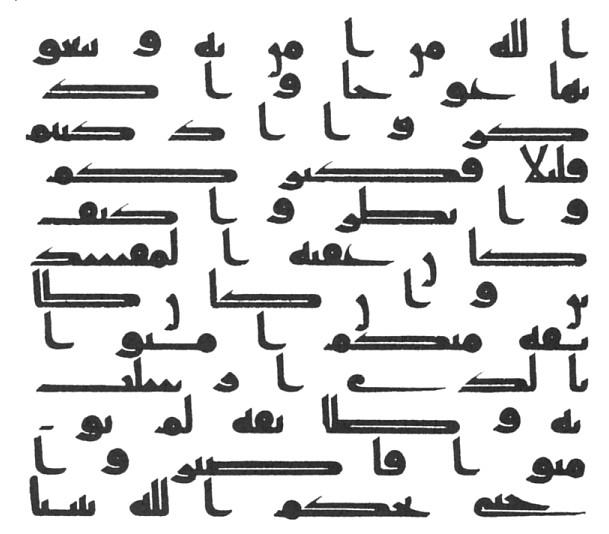
Kufic script from an early Qur'an manuscript, 7th century (Surah 7: 86–87)

Bismallah calligraphy

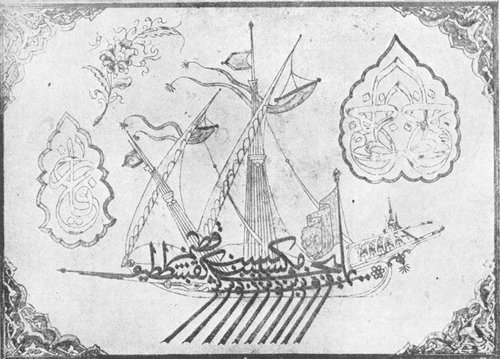
Islamic calligraphy represented for amulet of sailors in the Ottoman Empire

Islamic calligraphy praising Ali

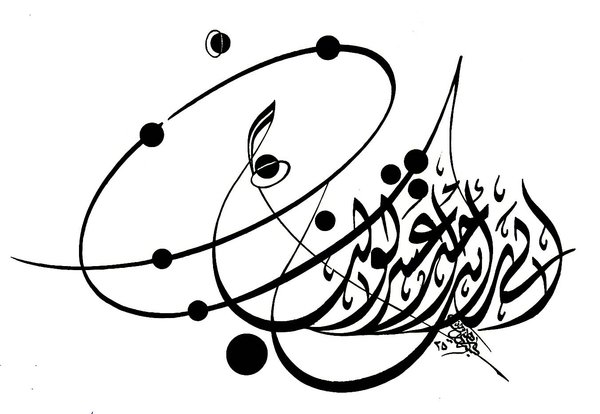
Modern Islamic calligraphy representing various planets

=== Calendar ===
Two calendars are used all over the Muslim world. One is the lunar calendar that is most widely used among Muslims and known in the West as the "Islamic calendar". The other one is a solar calendar officially used in Iran. Both measure time in the Hijri era: the lunar calendar counts lunar years (of twelve lunar months) and the solar calendar counts solar years.

==== Islamic lunar calendar ====
The (lunar) Hijri calendar (Arabic: ٱلتَّقْوِيم ٱلْهِجْرِيّ, romanized: al-taqwīm al-hijrī), also known in English as the Islamic calendar, Muslim calendar or Arabic calendar, is a lunar calendar consisting of 12 lunar months in a year of 354 or 355 days. It is used to determine the dates of Islamic holidays and rituals, such as the annual fasting and the annual season for the great pilgrimage. In almost all countries where the predominant religion is Islam, the civil calendar is the Gregorian calendar, with Syriac month-names used in the Levant and Mesopotamia (Iraq, Syria, Jordan, Lebanon and Palestine), but the religious calendar is the Hijri one.

This calendar enumerates the Hijri era, whose epoch was established at the Islamic New Year in 622 CE. During that year, Muhammad and his followers migrated from Mecca to Medina and established the first Muslim community (ummah), an event commemorated as the Hijrah. Although the "Persian" solar Hijri calendar shares this epoch, it counts years of 365 or 366 days and is therefore currently 42–43 years behind. In the West, dates in this era are usually denoted AH (Latin: Anno Hegirae, lit. 'In the year of the Hijrah'). (Note: This notation is similar to that of AD for the Christian era, CE for the Common Era and AM for the Jewish era.) In Muslim countries, it is also sometimes denoted as H from its Arabic form (سَنَة هِجْرِيَّة, abbreviated ھ). In English, years prior to the Hijra are denoted as BH ("Before the Hijra").

Since 16 June 2026 CE, the current Islamic year is 1448 AH. In Gregorian calendar terms, 1448 AH runs to approximately 5 June 2027. (Note: Exact dates depend on which variant of the Islamic calendar is followed.)

==== Solar Hijri calendar ====
The Solar Hijri calendar (Note: Persian: گاه‌شماری هجری شمسی, romanized: Gâhšomâri-ye Hejri-ye Šamsi Pashto: لمريز لېږدیز کلیز, romanized: lmaríz legdíz kalíz Kurdish: ڕۆژژمێری کۆچیی ھەتاوی, romanized: Salnameya Koçberiyê) is the official calendar of Iran and the most widely used calendar in Afghanistan. It is a solar calendar, based on the Earth's orbit around the Sun. Each year begins on the day (Note: If the exact moment of astronomical March equinox occurs before noon (Tehran time), that day is considered the first day of Farvardin. If the equinox occurs after noon, the following day is designated as the first day of Farvardin.) of the March equinox and has years of 365 or 366 days. It is sometimes also called the Shamsi calendar, Khorshidi calendar, Persian calendar, or Iranian Solar calendar and the most recent of the Iranian calendars. It is abbreviated as SH, HS, AP, or, sometimes as AHSh, while the lunar Hijri calendar (commonly known in the West as the 'Islamic calendar') is usually abbreviated as AH.

The epoch (very first day of the first year) of the Solar Hijri calendar was the day of the spring equinox, March 19, 622 CE. The calendar is a "Hijri calendar" because that was the year that Muhammad is believed to have left from Mecca to Medina; this event is referred to as the Hijrah.

The calendar is widely used by many Central Asian and West Asian ethnic groups, such as the Kurds, Pashtuns, Tajiks, Hazaras, Persians, Azerbaijanis, Yazidis, Lurs, Gilaks, Mazanderanis, Qashqais, Khorasani Turks, Nuristanis, Pashayis, Aimaqs, and Talysh people. Smaller groups of Turkmens, Balochs, Uzbeks, and Arabs also use this calendar.

Since the calendar uses astronomical observations and calculations for determining the vernal equinox, it theoretically has no intrinsic error in matching the vernal equinox year. According to Iranian studies, it is older than the lunar Hijri calendar used by the majority of Muslims (known in the West as the Islamic calendar); though they both count from the year of the Hijrah. The solar Hijri calendar uses solar years and is calculated based on the "year of the Hijrah," and the lunar Hijri calendar is based on lunar months, and dates from the presumed actual "day of the Hijrah".

Each of the twelve months of the solar Hijri calendar corresponds with a zodiac sign. In Iran before 1925 and in Afghanistan before 2023, the names of the zodiacal signs were used for the months; elsewhere the month names are the same as in the Zoroastrian calendar. The first six months have 31 days, the next five have 30 days, and the last month has 29 days in common years, 30 in leap years.

The ancient Iranian New Year's Day, which is called Nowruz, always falls on the March equinox. Nowruz is celebrated by communities in a wide range of countries from the Balkans to Central Asia.

== Women ==
According to Riada Asimovic Akyol, while Muslim women's experiences differ considerably by location and personal situations such as family upbringing, class and education; the difference between culture and religions is often ignored by community and state leaders in many of the Muslim majority countries. The key issue in the Muslim world regarding gender issues is that religious texts constructed in highly patriarchal environments and based on biological essentialism are still valued highly in Islam, hence views emphasizing on men's superiority in unequal gender roles are widespread among many conservative Muslims (men and women). Orthodox Muslims often believe that rights and responsibilities of women in Islam are different from that of men and sacrosanct since assigned by the God. According to Asma Barlas, patriarchal behaviour among Muslims is based in an ideology which jumbles sexual and biological differences with gender dualisms and inequality. Modernist discourse of liberal progressive movements like Islamic feminism have been revisiting hermeneutics of feminism in Islam in terms of respect for Muslim women's lives and rights. Riada Asimovic Akyol further says that equality for Muslim women needs to be achieved through self-criticism.

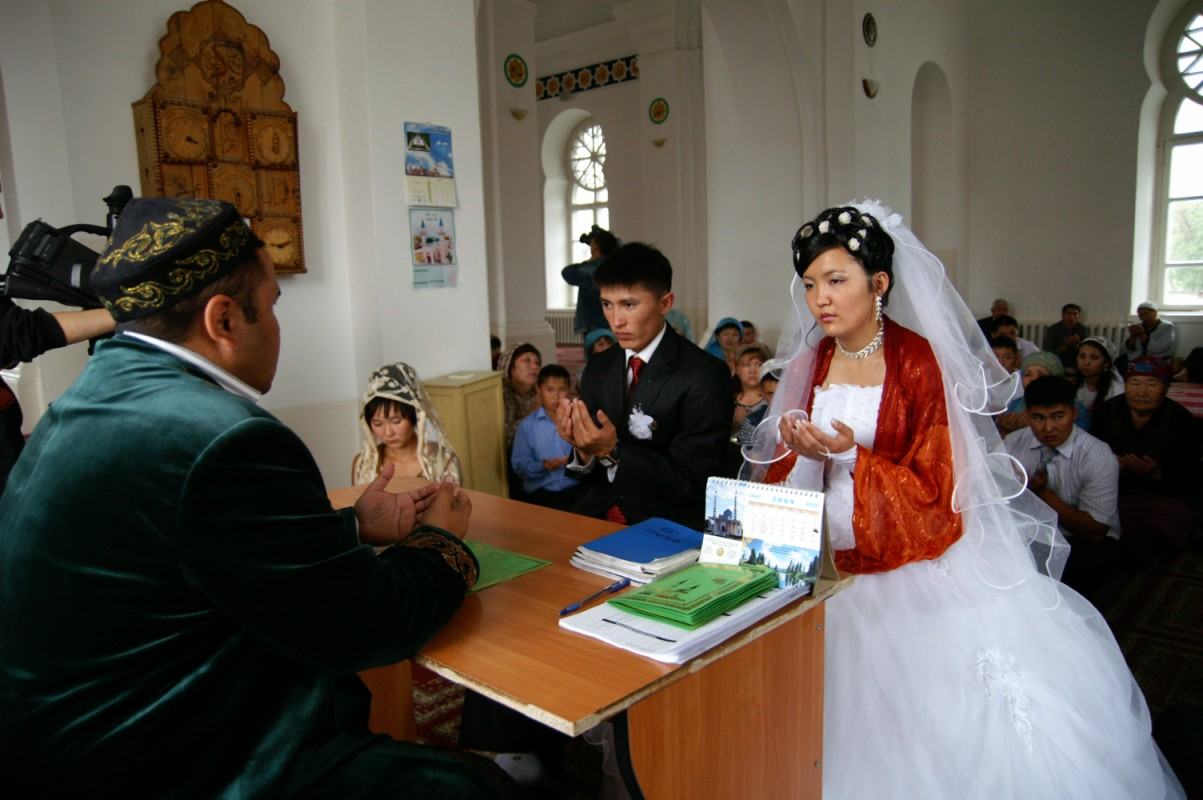
A Kazakh wedding ceremony in a mosque

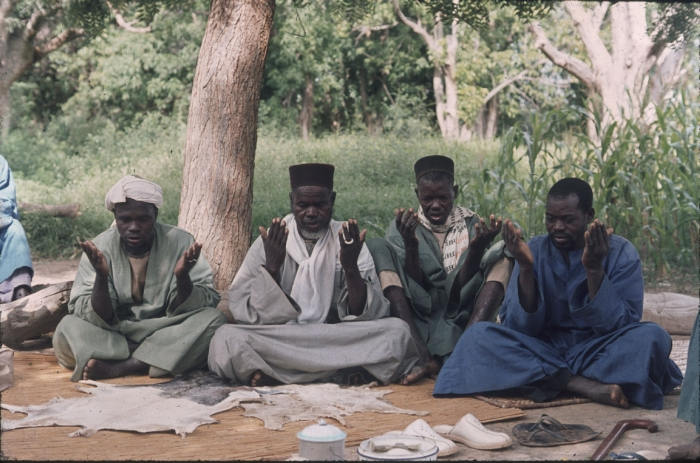
A group of marabouts – West African religious leaders and teachers of the Quran

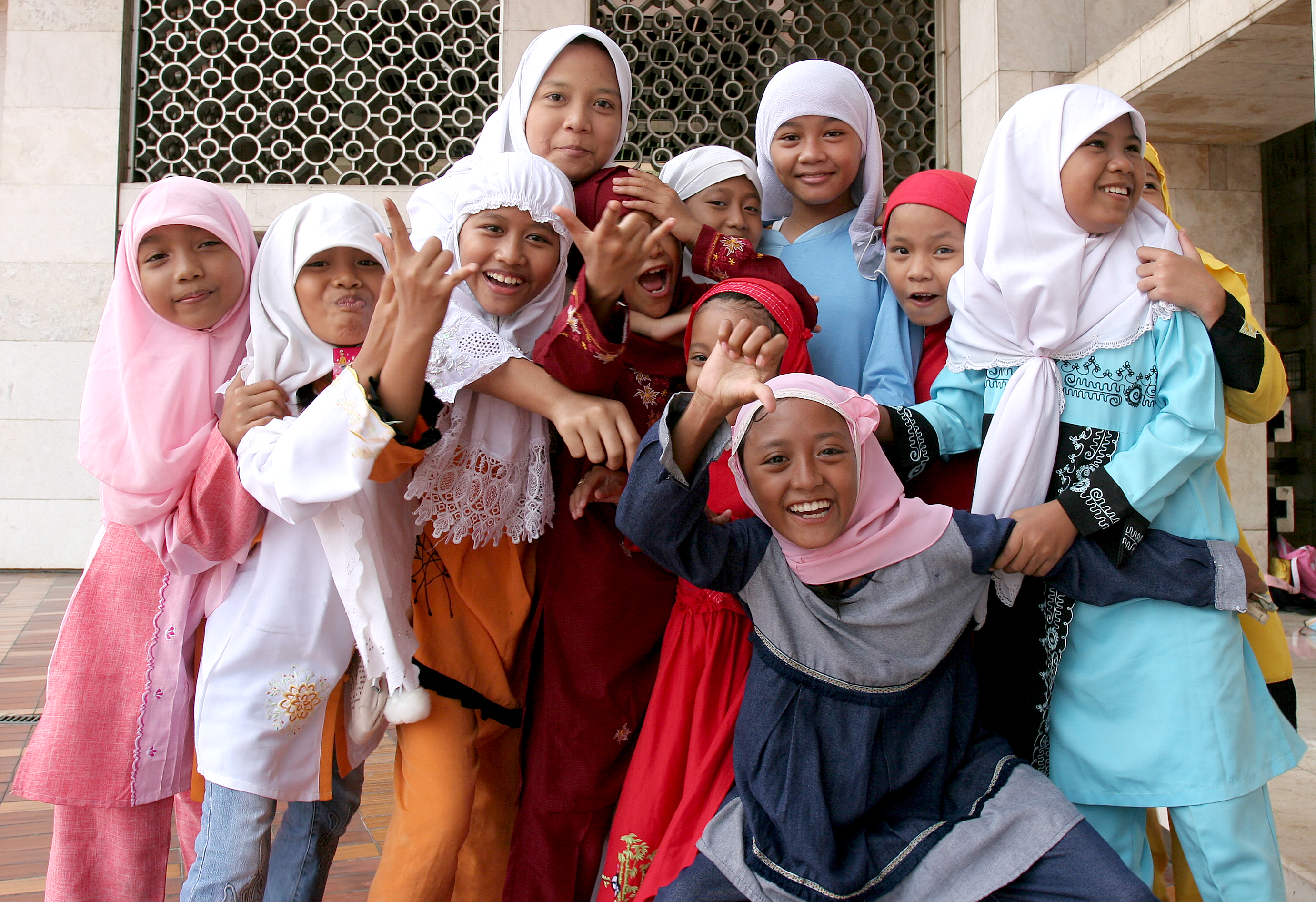
Muslim girls at Istiqlal Mosque in Jakarta

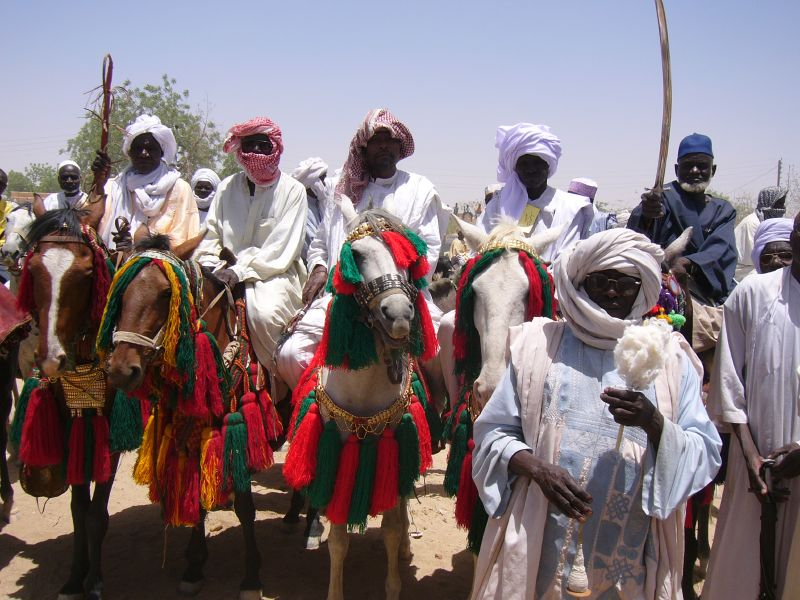
A tribal delegation in Chad

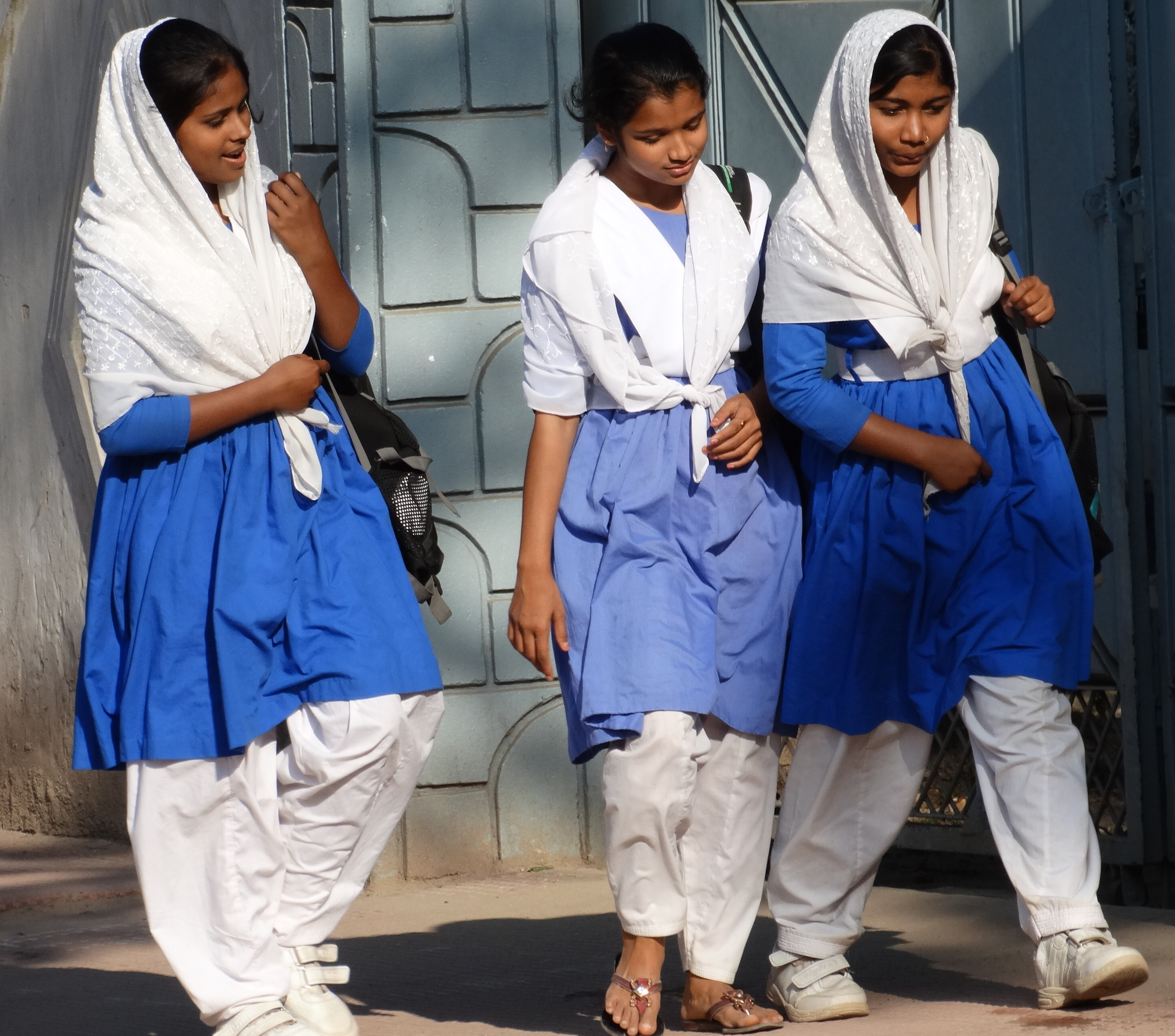
Muslim girls walking for school in Bangladesh

== See also ==
- Arab world
- Glossary of Islam
- History of the Arabs
- History of Islam
- Index of Islam-related articles
- Outline of Islam
- Spread of Islam
- Islam by country
- Islamic studies
- Islam and other religions
- Pan-Islamism
- Islamic Military Counter Terrorism Coalition
- Organisation of Islamic Cooperation
- Sīrah
- List of largest cities in the Organisation of Islamic Cooperation member countries
- OPEC
