= Early Islamic philosophy =

Early Islamic philosophy or classical Islamic philosophy is a period of intense philosophical development beginning in the 2nd century AH of the Islamic calendar (early 9th century CE) and lasting until the 6th century AH (late 12th century CE). The period is known as the Islamic Golden Age, and the achievements of this period had a crucial influence in the development of modern philosophy and science. For Renaissance Europe, "Muslim maritime, agricultural, and technological innovations, as well as much East Asian technology via the Muslim world, made their way to western Europe in one of the largest technology transfers in world history." This period starts with al-Kindi in the 9th century and ends with Averroes (Ibn Rushd) at the end of 12th century. The death of Averroes effectively marks the end of a particular discipline of Islamic philosophy usually called the Peripatetic Arabic School, and philosophical activity declined significantly in Western Islamic countries, namely in Islamic Spain and North Africa, though it persisted for much longer in the Eastern countries, in particular Persia and India where several schools of philosophy continued to flourish: Avicennism, Illuminationist philosophy, Mystical philosophy, and Transcendent theosophy.

Intellectual innovations, achievements, and advancements of this period included, within jurisprudence, the development of ijtihad, a method or methodological approach to legal reasoning, interpretation, and argument based on independent inquiry and analogical deduction; within science and the philosophy of science, the development of empirical research methods emphasizing controlled experimentation, observational evidence, and reproducibility, as well as early formulations of empiricist epistemologies; commentaries and developments in Aristotelian logic, as well as innovations in non-Aristotelian temporal modal logic and inductive logic; and developments in research practice and methodology, including, within medicine, the first documented peer review process and within jurisprudence and theology, a strict science of citation, the isnad or "backing".

The translation of Arabic works from this period into Hebrew and Latin in the Middle Ages had a significant impact upon Jewish philosophy as well as almost all philosophical disciplines in the medieval Latin Western world. The works of al-Fārābī, Avicenna, and Averroes were particularly influential in the fields of natural philosophy, psychology, metaphysics, logic, and ethics, directly and indirectly influencing the work of thinkers such as Thomas Aquinas, Roger Bacon, Maimonedes, William of Ockham, and Duns Scotus.

Early Islamic philosophy can be divided into clear sets of influences, branches, schools, and fields, as described below.

== Origins ==
According to the Encyclopaedia of the Qurʾān (2006), "The Qurʾān displays a wide range of theological topics related to the religious thought of late antiquity and through its prophet Muḥammad presents a coherent vision of the creator, the cosmos and man. The main issues of Muslim theological dispute prove to be hidden under the wording of the qurʾānic message, which is closely tied to Muḥammad's biography". However, modern historians and scholars of Islamic studies recognize that some instances of theological thought were already developed among polytheistic Pagans in pre-Islamic Arabia, such as the belief in fatalism (ḳadar), which reoccurs in Islamic theology regarding the metaphysical debates on the attributes of God in Islam, predestination, and human free-will.

=== Muhammad ===
The life of Muhammad or sira generated both the Qur'an (revelation) and hadith (his daily utterances and discourses), during which philosophy was defined by Muslims as consisting in acceptance or rejection of his message. Together the sira and hadith constitute the sunnah and are validated by isnad ("backing") to determine the likely truth of the report of any given saying of Muhammad. Key figures are Imam Ahmad ibn Hanbal, Imam Bukhari, Imam Muslim, Al-Tirmidhi, Ibn Majah, Abu Dawud, and Al-Nasa'i. This work, which was not completed until the 10th century, began shortly after The Farewell Sermon in 631.

== Branches ==
=== Kalam ===
Ilm al-Kalām (Arabic: علم الكلام, literally the study of "speech" or "words") is the Islamic philosophical discipline of seeking theological principles through dialectic. Kalām in Islamic practice relates to the discipline of seeking theological knowledge through debate and argument. A scholar of kalām is referred to as a mutakallim (plural mutakallimiin).

With Kalam, questions about the sira and hadith, as well as science (Islamic science) and law (fiqh and sharia), began to be investigated beyond the scope of Muhammad's beliefs. This period is characterized by emergence of ijtihad and the first fiqh. As the Sunnah became published and accepted, philosophy separate from Muslim theology was discouraged due to a lack of participants. During this period, traditions similar to Socratic method began to evolve, but philosophy remained subordinate to religion.

Independent minds exploiting the methods of ijtihad sought to investigate the doctrines of the Qur'an, which until then had been accepted in faith on the authority of divine revelation. One of the first debates was that between the Qadarites, who affirmed free will, and the Jabarites, who maintained the belief in fatalism.

At the 2nd century of the Hijra, a new movement arose in the theological school of Basra, Iraq. A pupil, Wasil ibn Ata (AD 700–748), who was expelled from the school of Hasan of Basra because his answers were contrary to then-orthodox Islamic tradition and became leader of a new school, and systematized the radical opinions of preceding sects, particularly those of the Qadarites. This new school was called Muʿtazila (from i'tazala, which means "to separate oneself" or "to dissent") that lasted from the 8th to 10th centuries. Its principal dogmas were three:

1. God is an absolute unity, and no attribute can be ascribed to Him.
2. Man is a free agent. It is on account of these two principles that the Mu'tazilities designate themselves the "Partisans of Justice and Unity".
3. All knowledge necessary for the salvation of man emanates from his reason; humans could acquire knowledge before, as well as after, Revelation, by the sole light of reason. This fact makes knowledge obligatory upon all men, at all times, and in all places.

In the history of Islam, one of the earliest systematic schools of Islamic theology to develop were the Muʿtazila in the mid-8th century CE. Muʿtazilite theologians emphasized the use of reason and rational thought, positing that the injunctions of God are accessible through rational thought and inquiry, and affirmed that the Quran was created (makhlūq) rather than co-eternal with God, which would develop into one of the most contentious questions in the history of Islamic theology.

In the 9th–10th century CE, the Ashʿarī school developed as a response to the Muʿtazila, founded by the 10th-century Muslim scholar and theologian Abū al-Ḥasan al-Ashʿarī. Ashʿarītes still taught the use of reason in understanding the Quran, but denied the possibility to deduce moral truths by reasoning. This position was opposed by the Māturīdī school; according to its founder, the 10th-century Muslim scholar and theologian Abū Manṣūr al-Māturīdī, human reason is supposed to acknowledge the existence of a creator deity (bāriʾ) solely based on rational thought and independently from divine revelation. He shared this conviction with his teacher and predecessor Abū Ḥanīfa al-Nuʿmān (8th century CE), whereas al-Ashʿarī never held such a view.

According to the Afghan-American philosopher Sayed Hassan Hussaini, the early schools of Islamic theology and theological beliefs among classical Muslim philosophers are characterized by "a rich color of Deism with a slight disposition toward theism".

=== Falsafa ===
From the 9th century onward, owing to Caliph al-Ma'mun and his successor, Greek philosophy was introduced among the Arabs, and the Peripatetic school began to find able representatives among them; such were Al-Kindi, Al-Farabi, Ibn Sina (Avicenna), and Ibn Rushd (Averroës), all of whose fundamental principles were considered as criticized by the Mutakallamin. Another trend, represented by the Brethren of Purity, used Aristotelian language to expound a fundamentally Neoplatonic and Neopythagorean world view.

During the Abbasid caliphate a number of thinkers and scientists, some of them heterodox Muslims or non-Muslims, played a role in transmitting Greek, Hindu, and other pre-Islamic knowledge to the Christian West. They contributed to making Aristotle known in Christian Europe. Three speculative thinkers, al-Farabi, Ibn Sina (Avicenna) and al-Kindi, combined Aristotelianism and Neoplatonism with other ideas introduced through Islam. They were considered by many as highly unorthodox and a few even described them as non-Islamic philosophers.

From Spain Arabic philosophic literature was translated into Hebrew and Latin, contributing to the development of modern European philosophy. The philosophers Moses Maimonides (a Jew born in Muslim Spain) and Ibn Khaldun (born in modern-day Tunisia), the father of sociology and historiography, were also important philosophers, though the latter did not identify himself as a falsafa, but rather a kalam author.

=== Some differences between Kalam and Falsafa ===
Aristotle attempted to demonstrate the unity of God; but from the view which he maintained, that matter was eternal, it followed that God could not be the Creator of the world. To assert that God's knowledge extends only to the general laws of the universe, and not to individual and accidental things, is tantamount to denying prophecy. One other part of Aristotle's theory shocked the faith of the Mutakallamin — the Aristotelian theory of the soul. According to Aristotelianism, the human soul is simply man's substantial form, the set of properties that make matter into a living human body. This seems to imply that the human soul cannot exist apart from the body. Indeed, Aristotle writes, "It is clear that the soul, or at least some parts of it (if it is divisible), cannot be separated from the body. [...] And thus, those have the right idea who think that the soul does not exist without the body." In Aristotelianism, at least one psychological force, the active intellect, can exist apart from the body. However, according to many interpretations, the active intellect is a superhuman entity emanating from God and enlightening the human mind, not a part of any individual human soul. Thus, Aristotle's theories seem to deny the immortality of the individual human soul.

Wherefore the Mutakallamin had, before anything else, to establish a system of philosophy to demonstrate the creation of matter, and they adopted to that end the theory of atoms as enunciated by Democritus. They taught that atoms possess neither quantity nor extension. Originally atoms were created by God, and are created now as occasion seems to require. Bodies come into existence or die, through the aggregation or the sunderance of these atoms. But this theory did not remove the objections of philosophy to a creation of matter.

For, indeed, if it be supposed that God commenced His work at a certain definite time by His "will", and for a certain definite object, it must be admitted that He was imperfect before accomplishing His will, or before attaining His object. In order to obviate this difficulty, the Motekallamin extended their theory of the atoms to Time, and claimed that just as Space is constituted of atoms and vacuum, Time, likewise, is constituted of small indivisible moments. The creation of the world once established, it was an easy matter for them to demonstrate the existence of a Creator, and that God is unique, omnipotent, and omniscient.

=== Main protagonists of Falsafa and their critics ===
The 12th century saw the apotheosis of pure philosophy and the decline of the Kalam, which later, being attacked by both the philosophers and the orthodox, perished for lack of champions. This supreme exaltation of philosophy may be attributed, in great measure, to Al-Ghazali (1005–1111) among the Persians, and to Judah ha-Levi (1140) among the Jews. It can be argued that the attacks directed against the philosophers by Al-Ghazali in his work, Tahafut al-Falasifa (The Incoherence of the Philosophers), not only produced, by reaction, a current favorable to philosophy, but induced the philosophers themselves to profit by his criticism. They thereafter made their theories clearer and their logic closer. The influence of this reaction brought forth the two greatest philosophers that the Islamic Peripatetic school ever produced, namely, Ibn Bajjah (Avempace) and Ibn Rushd (Averroes), both of whom undertook the defense of philosophy.

Since no idea and no literary or philosophical movement ever germinated on Persian or Arabian soil without leaving its impress on the Jews, the Persian Ghazali found an imitator in the person of Judah ha-Levi. This poet also took upon himself to free his religion from what he saw as the shackles of speculative philosophy, and to this end wrote the "Kuzari", in which he sought to discredit all schools of philosophy alike. He passes severe censure upon the Mutakallamin for seeking to support religion by philosophy. He says, "I consider him to have attained the highest degree of perfection who is convinced of religious truths without having scrutinized them and reasoned over them" ("Kuzari", v.). Then he reduced the chief propositions of the Mutakallamin, to prove the unity of God, to ten in number, describing them at length, and concluding in these terms: "Does the Kalam give us more information concerning God and His attributes than the prophet did?" (Ib. iii. and iv.) Aristotelianism finds no favor in Judah ha-Levi's eyes, for it is no less given to details and criticism; Neoplatonism alone suited him somewhat, owing to its appeal to his poetic temperament.

Ibn Rushd (Averroës), the contemporary of Maimonides, closed the first great philosophical era of the Muslims. He was a defender of Aristotelian philosophy against Ash'ari theologians led by Al-Ghazali. Averroes' philosophy was considered controversial in Muslim circles. The theories of Ibn Rushd do not differ fundamentally from those of Ibn Bajjah and Ibn Tufail, who only follow the teachings of Ibn Sina (Avicenna) and Al-Farabi. Like all Islamic Peripatetics, Ibn Rushd admits the hypothesis of the intelligence of the spheres and the hypothesis of universal emanation, through which motion is communicated from place to place to all parts of the universe as far as the supreme world—hypotheses which, in the mind of the Arabic philosophers, did away with the dualism involved in Aristotle's doctrine of pure energy and eternal matter. His ideas on the separation of philosophy and religion, further developed by the Averroist school of philosophy, were later influential in the development of modern secularism.

But while Al-Farabi, Ibn Sina (Avicenna), and other Persian and Muslim philosophers hurried, so to speak, over subjects that trenched on religious dogmas, Ibn Rushd delighted in dwelling upon them with full particularity and stress. Thus he says, "Not only is matter eternal, but form is potentially inherent in matter; otherwise, it were a creation ex nihilo" (Munk, "Mélanges", p. 444). According to this theory, therefore, the existence of this world is not only a possibility, as Ibn Sina declared—in order to make concessions to the orthodox— but also a necessity.

Driven from the Islamic schools, Islamic philosophy found a refuge with the Jews, to whom belongs the honor of having transmitted it to the Christian world. A series of eminent men—such as the Ibn Tibbons, Narboni, Gersonides—joined in translating the Arabic philosophical works into Hebrew and commenting upon them. The works of Ibn Rushd especially became the subject of their study, due in great measure to Maimonides, who, in a letter addressed to his pupil Joseph ben Judah, spoke in the highest terms of Ibn Rushd's commentary.

It should be mentioned that this depiction of intellectual tradition in Islamic Lands is mainly dependent upon what West could understand (or was willing to understand) from this long era. In contrast, there are some historians and philosophers who do not agree with this account and describe this era in a completely different way. Their main point of dispute is on the influence of different philosophers on Islamic Philosophy, especially the comparative importance of eastern intellectuals such as Ibn Sina and of western thinkers such as Ibn Rushd.

=== Judeo-Islamic philosophy ===
The oldest Jewish religio-philosophical work preserved is that of Saadia Gaon (892–942), Emunot ve-Deot, "The Book of Beliefs and Opinions". In this work Saadia treats the questions that interested the Mutakallamin, such as the creation of matter, the unity of God, the divine attributes, the soul, etc. Saadia criticizes other philosophers severely. For Saadia there was no problem as to creation: God created the world ex nihilo, just as the Bible attests; and he contests the theory of the Mutakallamin in reference to atoms, which theory, he declares, is just as contrary to reason and religion as the theory of the philosophers professing the eternity of matter.

To prove the unity of God, Saadia uses the demonstrations of the Mutakallamin. Only the attributes of essence (sifat al-dhatia) can be ascribed to God, but not the attributes of action (sifat-al-fi'aliya). The soul is a substance more delicate even than that of the celestial spheres. Here Saadia controverts the Mutakallamin, who considered the soul an "accident" 'arad (compare Guide for the Perplexed i. 74), and employs the following one of their premises to justify his position: "Only a substance can be the substratum of an accident" (that is, of a non-essential property of things). Saadia argues: "If the soul be an accident only, it can itself have no such accidents as wisdom, joy, love", etc. Saadia was thus in every way a supporter of the Kalam; and if at times he deviated from its doctrines, it was owing to his religious views; just as the Jewish and Muslim Peripatetics stopped short in their respective Aristotelianism whenever there was danger of wounding orthodox religion.

== Schools ==
=== Farabism ===
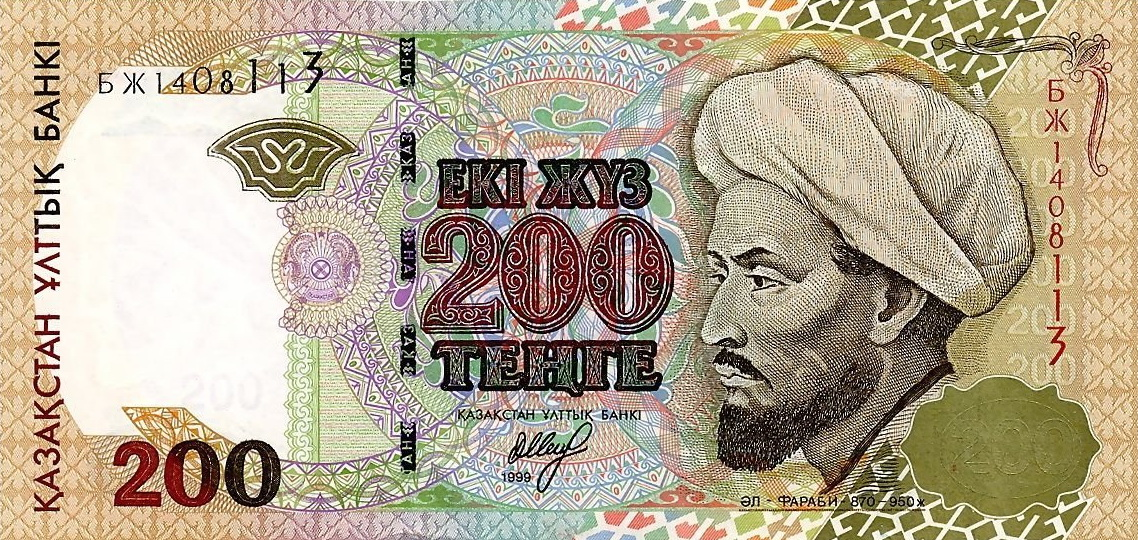
Al-Farabi (Alfarabi), the founder of Farabism.

Al-Farabi (Alfarabi) was a founder of his own school of Islamic philosophy but which was later overshadowed by Avicennism. Al-Farabi's school of philosophy "breaks with the philosophy of Plato and Aristotle [... and ...] moves from metaphysics to methodology, a move that anticipates modernity", and "at the level of philosophy, Alfarabi unites theory and practice [... and] in the sphere of the political he liberates practice from theory". His Neoplatonic theology is also more than just metaphysics as rhetoric. In his attempt to think through the nature of a First Cause, Alfarabi discovers the limits of human knowledge".

Al-Farabi had great influence on science and philosophy for several centuries, and was widely considered second only to Aristotle in knowledge (alluded to by his title of "the Second Teacher") in his time. His work, aimed at synthesis of philosophy and Sufism, paved the way for the work of Ibn Sina (Avicenna).

=== Avicennism ===
Due to Avicenna's (Ibn Sina's) successful reconciliation between Aristotelianism and Neoplatonism along with Kalam, Avicennism eventually became the leading school of Islamic philosophy by the 12th century. Avicenna had become a central authority on philosophy by then, and several scholars in the 12th century commented on his strong influence at the time:

"People nowadays [believe] that truth is whatever [Ibn Sina] says, that it is inconceivable for him to err, and that whoever contradicts him in anything he says cannot be rational."

Avicennism was also influential in medieval Europe, particularly his doctrines on the nature of the soul and his existence-essence distinction, along with the debates and censure that they raised in scholastic Europe. This was particularly the case in Paris, where Avicennism was later proscribed in 1210. Nevertheless, his psychology and theory of knowledge influenced William of Auvergne and Albertus Magnus, and his metaphysics influenced the thought of Thomas Aquinas.

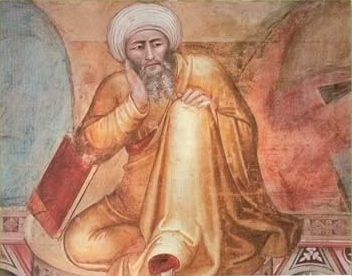
Averroes (Ibn Rushd), the founder of Averroism.

=== Averroism ===
Averroes (Ibn Rushd) is most famous for his commentaries on Aristotle's works and for writing The Incoherence of the Incoherence in which he defended the falasifa against al-Ghazali's The Incoherence of the Philosophers. While he had very little influence in the Islamic world, which was then dominated by Avicennian philosophy and Ash'ari theology, Averroism became very influential in medieval Europe, especially among the Scholastics. Averroism eventually led to the development of modern secularism, for which Ibn Rushd is considered as the founding father of secular thought in Western Europe.

The concept of "existence precedes essence", a key foundational concept of existentialism, can also be found in the works of Averroes, as a reaction to Avicenna's concept of "essence precedes existence".

== Ethics ==
=== Environmental philosophy ===
Perhaps due to resource scarcity in most Islamic nations, there was an emphasis on limited (and some claim also sustainable) use of natural capital, i.e. producing land. Traditions of haram and hima and early urban planning were expressions of strong social obligations to stay within carrying capacity and to preserve the natural environment as an obligation of khalifa or "stewardship".

Muhammad is considered a pioneer of environmentalism for his teachings on environmental preservation. His hadiths on agriculture and environmental philosophy were compiled in the "Book of Agriculture" of the Sahih Bukhari, which included the following saying:

Allah's Messenger said, "There is none amongst the Muslims who plants a tree or sows seeds, and then a bird, or a person or an animal eats from it, but is regarded as a charitable gift for him."

— Sahih al-Bukhari 2320

Several such statements concerning the environment are also found in the Qur'an, such as the following:

All living beings roaming the earth and winged birds soaring in the sky are communities like yourselves.1 We have left nothing out of the Record.2 Then to their Lord they will be gathered all together.

— Surah Al-An'am 6:38

The earliest known treatises dealing with environmentalism and environmental science, especially pollution, were Arabic medical treatises written by al-Kindi, Qusta ibn Luqa, al-Razi, Ibn Al-Jazzar, al-Tamimi, al-Masihi, Avicenna, Ali ibn Ridwan, Ibn Jumay‘, Isaac Israeli ben Solomon, Ibn al-Quff, and Ibn al-Nafis. Their works covered a number of subjects related to pollution such as air pollution, water pollution, soil contamination, municipal solid waste mishandling, and environmental impact assessments of certain localities. Cordoba, al-Andalus also had the first waste containers and waste disposal facilities for litter collection.

=== Medical ethics ===
The ethical standards of Muslim physicians was first laid down in the 9th century by Ishaq bin Ali Rahawi, who wrote the Adab al-Tabib (Conduct of a Physician), the first treatist dedicated to medical ethics. He regarded physicians as "guardians of souls and bodies", and wrote twenty chapters on various topics related to medical ethics, including:

- What the physician must avoid and beware of
- The manners of visitors
- The care of remedies by the physician
- The dignity of the medical profession
- The examination of physicians
- The removal of corruption among physicians

=== Humanism ===
Many medieval Muslim thinkers pursued humanistic, rational and scientific discourses in their search for knowledge, meaning and values. A wide range of Islamic writings on love poetry, history and philosophical theology show that medieval Islamic thought was open to the humanistic ideas of individualism, occasional secularism, skepticism and liberalism.

Another reason the Islamic world flourished during the Middle Ages was an early emphasis on freedom of speech, as summarized by al-Hashimi (a cousin of Caliph al-Ma'mun) in the following letter to one of the religious opponents he was attempting to convert through reason:

"Bring forward all the arguments you wish and say whatever you please and speak your mind freely. Now that you are safe and free to say whatever you please appoint some arbitrator who will impartially judge between us and lean only towards the truth and be free from the empery of passion, and that arbitrator shall be Reason, whereby God makes us responsible for our own rewards and punishments. Herein I have dealt justly with you and have given you full security and am ready to accept whatever decision Reason may give for me or against me. For "There is no compulsion in religion" (Quran 2:256) and I have only invited you to accept our faith willingly and of your own accord and have pointed out the hideousness of your present belief. Peace be with you and the blessings of God!"

Certain aspects of Renaissance humanism has its roots in the medieval Islamic world, including the "art of dictation, called in Latin, ars dictaminis," and "the humanist attitude toward classical language."

== Logic ==
In early Islamic philosophy, logic played an important role. Islamic law placed importance on formulating standards of argument, which gave rise to a novel approach to logic in Kalam, but this approach was later displaced by ideas from Greek philosophy and Hellenistic philosophy with the rise of the Mu'tazili philosophers, who highly valued Aristotle's Organon. The works of Hellenistic-influenced Islamic philosophers were crucial in the reception of Aristotelian logic in medieval Europe, along with the commentaries on the Organon by Averroes. The works of al-Farabi, Avicenna, al-Ghazali and other Muslim logicians who often criticized and corrected Aristotelian logic and introduced their own forms of logic, also played a central role in the subsequent development of European logic during the Renaissance.

According to the Routledge Encyclopedia of Philosophy:

"For the Islamic philosophers, logic included not only the study of formal patterns of inference and their validity but also elements of the philosophy of language and even of epistemology and metaphysics. Because of territorial disputes with the Arabic grammarians, Islamic philosophers were very interested in working out the relationship between logic and language, and they devoted much discussion to the question of the subject matter and aims of logic in relation to reasoning and speech. In the area of formal logical analysis, they elaborated upon the theory of terms, propositions and syllogisms as formulated in Aristotle's Categories, De interpretatione and Prior Analytics. In the spirit of Aristotle, they believed that all rational argument can be reduced to a syllogism, and they regarded syllogistic theory as the focal point of logic. Even poetics was considered as a syllogistic art in some fashion by most of the major Islamic Aristotelians."

Important developments made by Muslim logicians included the development of "Avicennian logic" as a replacement of Aristotelian logic. Avicenna's system of logic was responsible for the introduction of hypothetical syllogism, temporal modal logic and inductive logic. Other important developments in early Islamic philosophy include the development of a strict science of citation, the isnad or "backing", and the development of a scientific method of open inquiry to disprove claims, the ijtihad, which could be generally applied to many types of questions.

=== Logic in Islamic law and theology ===
Early forms of analogical reasoning, inductive reasoning and categorical syllogism were introduced in Fiqh (Islamic jurisprudence), Sharia (Islamic law) and Kalam (Islamic theology) from the 7th century with the process of Qiyas, before the Arabic translations of Aristotle's works. Later during the Islamic Golden Age, there was a logical debate among Islamic philosophers, logicians and theologians over whether the term Qiyas refers to analogical reasoning, inductive reasoning or categorical syllogism. Some Islamic scholars argued that Qiyas refers to inductive reasoning, which Ibn Hazm (994–1064) disagreed with, arguing that Qiyas does not refer to inductive reasoning, but refers to categorical syllogism in a real sense and analogical reasoning in a metaphorical sense. On the other hand, al-Ghazali (1058–1111) (and in modern times, Abu Muhammad Asem al-Maqdisi) argued that Qiyas refers to analogical reasoning in a real sense and categorical syllogism in a metaphorical sense. Other Islamic scholars at the time, however, argued that the term Qiyas refers to both analogical reasoning and categorical syllogism in a real sense.

=== Aristotelian logic ===
The first original Arabic writings on logic were produced by al-Kindi (Alkindus) (805–873), who produced a summary on earlier logic up to his time. The first writings on logic with non-Aristotelian elements was produced by al-Farabi (Alfarabi) (873–950), who discussed the topics of future contingents, the number and relation of the categories, the relation between logic and grammar, and non-Aristotelian forms of inference. He is also credited for categorizing logic into two separate groups, the first being "idea" and the second being "proof".

Averroes (1126–98) was the last major logician from al-Andalus, who wrote the most elaborate commentaries on Aristotelian logic.

=== Avicennian logic ===
Avicenna (980–1037) developed his own system of logic known as "Avicennian logic" as an alternative to Aristotelian logic. By the 12th century, Avicennian logic had replaced Aristotelian logic as the dominant system of logic in the Islamic world.

The first criticisms of Aristotelian logic were written by Avicenna (980–1037), who produced independent treatises on logic rather than commentaries. He criticized the logical school of Baghdad for their devotion to Aristotle at the time. He investigated the theory of definition and classification and the quantification of the predicates of categorical propositions, and developed an original theory on "temporal modal" syllogism. Its premises included modifiers such as "at all times", "at most times", and "at some time".

While Avicenna (980–1037) often relied on deductive reasoning in philosophy, he used a different approach in medicine. Ibn Sina contributed inventively to the development of inductive logic, which he used to pioneer the idea of a syndrome. In his medical writings, Avicenna was the first to describe the methods of agreement, difference and concomitant variation which are critical to inductive logic and the scientific method.

Ibn Hazm (994–1064) wrote the Scope of Logic, in which he stressed on the importance of sense perception as a source of knowledge. Al-Ghazali (Algazel) (1058–1111) had an important influence on the use of logic in theology, making use of Avicennian logic in Kalam. Despite the logical sophistication of al-Ghazali, the rise of the Ash'ari school in the 12th century slowly suffocated original work on logic in much of the Islamic world, though logic continued to be studied in some Islamic regions such as Persia and the Levant.

Fakhr al-Din al-Razi (b. 1149) criticised Aristotle's "first figure" and developed a form of inductive logic, foreshadowing the system of inductive logic developed by John Stuart Mill (1806–1873). Systematic refutations of Greek logic were written by the Illuminationist school, founded by Shahab al-Din Suhrawardi (1155–1191), who developed the idea of "decisive necessity", an important innovation in the history of logical philosophical speculation. Another systematic refutation of Greek logic was written by Ibn Taymiyyah (1263–1328), the Ar-Radd 'ala al-Mantiqiyyin (Refutation of Greek Logicians), where he argued against the usefulness, though not the validity, of the syllogism and in favour of inductive reasoning.

== Metaphysics ==
=== Cosmological and ontological arguments ===
Avicenna's proof for the existence of God, known as the "Proof of the Truthful", was the first ontological argument, which he proposed in the Metaphysics section of The Book of Healing. This was the first attempt at using the method of a priori proof, which utilizes intuition and reason alone. Avicenna's proof of God's existence is unique in that it can be classified as both a cosmological argument and an ontological argument. "It is ontological insofar as 'necessary existence' in intellect is the first basis for arguing for a Necessary Existent". The proof is also "cosmological insofar as most of it is taken up with arguing that contingent existents cannot stand alone and must end up in a Necessary Existent."

=== Distinction between essence and existence ===
Islamic philosophy, imbued as it is with Islamic theology, distinguishes more clearly than Aristotelianism the difference between essence and existence. Whereas existence is the domain of the contingent and the accidental, essence endures within a being beyond the accidental. This was first described by Avicenna's works on metaphysics, who was himself influenced by al-Farabi.

Some orientalists (or those particularly influenced by Thomist scholarship) argued that Avicenna was the first to view existence (wujud) as an accident that happens to the essence (mahiyya). However, this aspect of ontology is not the most central to the distinction that Avicenna established between essence and existence. One cannot therefore make the claim that Avicenna was the proponent of the concept of essentialism per se, given that existence (al-wujud) when thought of in terms of necessity would ontologically translate into a notion of the Necessary-Existent-due-to-Itself (wajib al-wujud bi-dhatihi), which is without description or definition, and particularly without quiddity or essence (la mahiyya lahu). Consequently, Avicenna's ontology is 'existentialist' when accounting for being qua existence in terms of necessity (wujub), while it is 'essentialist' in terms of thinking about being qua existence (wujud) in terms of contingency qua possibility (imkan; or mumkin al-wujud: contingent being).

Some argue that Avicenna anticipated Frege and Bertrand Russell in "holding that existence is an accident of accidents" and also anticipated Alexius Meinong's "view about nonexistent objects." He also provided early arguments for "a 'necessary being' as cause of all other existents."

The idea of "essence precedes existence" is a concept which dates back to Avicenna and his school of Avicennism as well as Shahab al-Din Suhrawardi and his Illuminationist philosophy. The opposite idea of "existence precedes essence" was thus developed in the works of Averroes and Mulla Sadra's transcendent theosophy.

More careful approaches are needed in terms of thinking about philosophers (and theologians) in Islam in terms of phenomenological methods of investigation in ontology (or onto-theology), or by way of comparisons that are made with Heidegger's thought and his critique of the history of metaphysics.

==== Wajib al-Wujud ====
Usually Muslims call God (Allah) "Wajib al-Wujud". It can be said; In general, the difference between the "Islamic view" and other views is not in the principle of "realism", but in the image it presents of the real world based on it. In "Islamic philosophy", while admitting material existence, "non-material" and abstract existence is also proven, and the existence of the Supreme Being or this title is defined as the essence of existence, which is the axis of the whole world.

=== Resurrection ===
Ibn al-Nafis wrote the Theologus Autodidactus as a defense of "the system of Islam and the Muslims' doctrines on the missions of Prophets, the religious laws, the resurrection of the body, and the transitoriness of the world." The book presents rational arguments for bodily resurrection and the immortality of the human soul, using both demonstrative reasoning and material from the hadith corpus as forms of evidence. Later Islamic scholars viewed this work as a response to Avicenna's metaphysical argument on spiritual resurrection (as opposed to bodily resurrection), which was earlier criticized by al-Ghazali.

=== Soul and spirit ===
The Muslim physician-philosophers, Avicenna and Ibn al-Nafis, developed their own theories on the soul. They both made a distinction between the soul and the spirit, and in particular, the Avicennian doctrine on the nature of the soul was influential among the Scholastics. Some of Avicenna's views on the soul included the idea that the immortality of the soul is a consequence of its nature, and not a purpose for it to fulfill. In his theory of "The Ten Intellects", he viewed the human soul as the tenth and final intellect.

Avicenna generally supported Aristotle's idea of the soul originating from the heart, whereas Ibn al-Nafis on the other hand rejected this idea and instead argued that the soul "is related to the entirety and not to one or a few organs." He further criticized Aristotle's idea that every unique soul requires the existence of a unique source, in this case the heart. Ibn al-Nafis concluded that "the soul is related primarily neither to the spirit nor to any organ, but rather to the entire matter whose temperament is prepared to receive that soul" and he defined the soul as nothing other than "what a human indicates by saying 'I'."

=== Thought experiments ===
While he was imprisoned in the castle of Fardajan near Hamadhan, Avicenna wrote his famous "Floating Man" thought experiment to demonstrate human self-awareness and the substantiality of the soul. He referred to the living human intelligence, particularly the active intellect, which he believed to be the hypostasis by which God communicates truth to the human mind and imparts order and intelligibility to nature. His "Floating Man" thought experiment tells its readers to imagine themselves suspended in the air, isolated from all sensations, which includes no sensory contact with even their own bodies. He argues that, in this scenario, one would still have self-consciousness. He thus concludes that the idea of the self is not logically dependent on any physical thing, and that the soul should not be seen in relative terms, but as a primary given, a substance.

This argument was later refined and simplified by René Descartes in epistemic terms when he stated: "I can abstract from the supposition of all external things, but not from the supposition of my own consciousness."

=== Time ===
While ancient Greek philosophers believed that the universe had an infinite past with no beginning, early medieval philosophers and theologians developed the concept of the universe having a finite past with a beginning. This view was inspired by the creationism shared by Judaism, Christianity and Islam. The Christian philosopher John Philoponus presented a detailed argument against the ancient Greek notion of an infinite past. Muslim and Arab Jewish philosophers like Al-Kindi, Saadia Gaon, and Al-Ghazali developed further arguments, with most falling into two broad categories: assertions of the "impossibility of the existence of an actual infinite" and of the "impossibility of completing an actual infinite by successive addition".

=== Truth ===
In metaphysics, Avicenna (Ibn Sina) defined truth as:

"What corresponds in the mind to what is outside it."

Avicenna elaborated on his definition of truth in his Metaphysics:

"The truth of a thing is the property of the being of each thing which has been established in it."

In his Quodlibeta, Thomas Aquinas wrote a commentary on Avicenna's definition of truth in his Metaphysics and explained it as follows:

"The truth of each thing, as Avicenna says in his Metaphysica, is nothing else than the property of its being which has been established in it. So that is called true gold which has properly the being of gold and attains to the established determinations of the nature of gold. Now, each thing has properly being in some nature because it stands under the complete form proper to that nature, whereby being and species in that nature is."

Early Islamic political philosophy emphasized an inexorable link between science and religion and emphsized the process of ijtihad to find truth.

Ibn al-Haytham (Alhacen) reasoned that to discover the truth about nature, it is necessary to eliminate human opinion and error, and allow the universe to speak for itself. In his Aporias against Ptolemy, Ibn al-Haytham further wrote the following comments on truth:

"Truth is sought for itself [but] the truths, [he warns] are immersed in uncertainties [and the scientific authorities (such as Ptolemy, whom he greatly respected) are] not immune from error..."

"Therefore, the seeker after the truth is not one who studies the writings of the ancients and, following his natural disposition, puts his trust in them, but rather the one who suspects his faith in them and questions what he gathers from them, the one who submits to argument and demonstration, and not to the sayings of a human being whose nature is fraught with all kinds of imperfection and deficiency. Thus the duty of the man who investigates the writings of scientists, if learning the truth is his goal, is to make himself an enemy of all that he reads, and, applying his mind to the core and margins of its content, attack it from every side. He should also suspect himself as he performs his critical examination of it, so that he may avoid falling into either prejudice or leniency."

"I constantly sought knowledge and truth, and it became my belief that for gaining access to the effulgence and closeness to God, there is no better way than that of searching for truth and knowledge."

== Natural philosophy ==
=== Atomism ===
Atomistic philosophies are found very early in Islamic philosophy, and represent a synthesis of the Greek and Indian ideas. Islamic speculative theology in general approached issues in physics from an atomistic framework.

The most successful form of Islamic atomism was in the Asharite school of philosophy, most notably in the work of the philosopher al-Ghazali (1058–1111). In Asharite atomism, atoms are the only perpetual, material things in existence, and all else in the world is "accidental" meaning something that lasts for only an instant. Nothing accidental can be the cause of anything else, except perception, as it exists for a moment. Contingent events are not subject to natural physical causes, but are the direct result of God's constant intervention, without which nothing could happen. Thus nature is completely dependent on God, which meshes with other Asharite Islamic ideas on causation, or the lack thereof.

Other traditions in Islam rejected the atomism of the Asharites and expounded on many Greek texts, especially those of Aristotle. An active school of philosophers in Spain, including the noted commentator Averroes (1126-1198 AD) explicitly rejected the thought of al-Ghazali and turned to an extensive evaluation of the thought of Aristotle. Averroes commented in detail on most of the works of Aristotle and his commentaries did much to guide the interpretation of Aristotle in later Jewish and Christian scholastic thought.

=== Cosmology ===
There are several cosmological verses in the Qur'an (610–632) which some modern writers have interpreted as foreshadowing the expansion of the universe and possibly even the Big Bang theory:

Do the disbelievers not realize that the heavens and earth were ˹once˺ one mass then We split them apart? And We created from water every living thing. Will they not then believe?

— Surah Al-Anbiya 21:30

We built the universe with ˹great˺ might, and We are certainly expanding ˹it˺.

— Surah Adh-Dhariyat 51:47

In contrast to ancient Greek philosophers who believed that the universe had an infinite past with no beginning, medieval philosophers and theologians developed the concept of the universe having a finite past with a beginning. This view was inspired by the creation myth shared by the three Abrahamic religions: Judaism, Christianity and Islam. The Christian philosopher, John Philoponus, presented the first such argument against the ancient Greek notion of an infinite past. His reasoning was adopted by many, most notably; Muslim philosopher, Al-Kindi (Alkindus); the Jewish philosopher, Saadia Gaon (Saadia ben Joseph); and the Muslim theologian, Al-Ghazali (Algazel). They used two logical arguments against an infinite past, the first being the "argument from the impossibility of the existence of an actual infinite", which states:

"An actual infinite cannot exist."
"An infinite temporal regress of events is an actual infinite."
".•. An infinite temporal regress of events cannot exist."

The second argument, the "argument from the impossibility of completing an actual infinite by successive addition", states:

"An actual infinite cannot be completed by successive addition."
"The temporal series of past events has been completed by successive addition."
".•. The temporal series of past events cannot be an actual infinite."

Both arguments were adopted by later Christian philosophers and theologians, and the second argument in particular became more famous after it was adopted by Immanuel Kant in his thesis of the first antimony concerning time.

In the 10th century, the Brethren of Purity published the Encyclopedia of the Brethren of Purity, in which a heliocentric view of the universe is expressed in a section on cosmology:

"God has placed the Sun at the center of the Universe just as the capital of a country is placed in its middle and the ruler's palace at the center of the city."

=== Evolution ===
Struggle for existence

The Mu'tazili scientist and philosopher al-Jahiz (c. 776–869) was the first of the Muslim biologists and philosophers to develop an early theory of evolution. He speculated on the influence of the environment on animals, considered the effects of the environment on the likelihood of an animal to survive, and first described the struggle for existence, a precursor to natural selection. Al-Jahiz's ideas on the struggle for existence in the Book of Animals have been summarized as follows:

"Animals engage in a struggle for existence; for resources, to avoid being eaten and to breed. Environmental factors influence organisms to develop new characteristics to ensure survival, thus transforming into new species. Animals that survive to breed can pass on their successful characteristics to offspring."

In Chapter 47 of his India, entitled "On Vasudeva and the Wars of the Bharata," Abu Rayhan Biruni attempted to give a naturalistic explanation as to why the struggles described in the Mahabharata "had to take place." He explains it using natural processes that include biological ideas related to evolution, which has led several scholars to compare his ideas to Darwinism and natural selection. This is due to Biruni describing the idea of artificial selection and then applying it to nature:

"The agriculturist selects his corn, letting grow as much as he requires, and tearing out the remainder. The forester leaves those branches which he perceives to be excellent, whilst he cuts away all others. The bees kill those of their kind who only eat, but do not work in their beehive. Nature proceeds in a similar way; however, it does not distinguish for its action is under all circumstances one and the same. It allows the leaves and fruit of the trees to perish, thus preventing them from realising that result which they are intended to produce in the economy of nature. It removes them so as to make room for others."

In the 13th century, Nasir al-Din al-Tusi explains how the elements evolved into minerals, then plants, then animals, and then humans. Tusi then goes on to explain how hereditary variability was an important factor for biological evolution of living things:

"The organisms that can gain the new features faster are more variable. As a result, they gain advantages over other creatures. [...] The bodies are changing as a result of the internal and external interactions."

Tusi discusses how organisms are able to adapt to their environments:

"Look at the world of animals and birds. They have all that is necessary for defense, protection and daily life, including strengths, courage and appropriate tools [organs] [...] Some of these organs are real weapons, [...] For example, horns-spear, teeth and claws-knife and needle, feet and hoofs-cudgel. The thorns and needles of some animals are similar to arrows. [...] Animals that have no other means of defense (as the gazelle and fox) protect themselves with the help of flight and cunning. [...] Some of them, for example, bees, ants and some bird species, have united in communities in order to protect themselves and help each other."

Tusi then explains how humans evolved from advanced animals:

"Such humans [probably anthropoid apes] live in the Western Sudan and other distant corners of the world. They are close to animals by their habits, deeds and behavior. [...] The human has features that distinguish him from other creatures, but he has other features that unite him with the animal world, vegetable kingdom or even with the inanimate bodies."

Transmutation of species

Al-Dinawari (828–896), considered the founder of Arabic botany for his Book of Plants, discussed plant evolution from its birth to its death, describing the phases of plant growth and the production of flowers and fruit.

Ibn Miskawayh's al-Fawz al-Asghar and the Brethren of Purity's Encyclopedia of the Brethren of Purity (The Epistles of Ikhwan al-Safa) developed theories on evolution that possibly had an influence on Charles Darwin and his inception of Darwinism, but has at one time been criticized as overenthusiastic.

"[These books] state that God first created matter and invested it with energy for development. Matter, therefore, adopted the form of vapour which assumed the shape of water in due time. The next stage of development was mineral life. Different kinds of stones developed in course of time. Their highest form being mirjan (coral). It is a stone which has in it branches like those of a tree. After mineral life evolves vegetation. The evolution of vegetation culminates with a tree which bears the qualities of an animal. This is the date-palm. It has male and female genders. It does not wither if all its branches are chopped but it dies when the head is cut off. The date-palm is therefore considered the highest among the trees and resembles the lowest among animals. Then is born the lowest of animals. It evolves into an ape. This is not the statement of Darwin. This is what Ibn Maskawayh states and this is precisely what is written in the Epistles of Ikhwan al-Safa. The Muslim thinkers state that ape then evolved into a lower kind of a barbarian man. He then became a superior human being. Man becomes a saint, a prophet. He evolves into a higher stage and becomes an angel. The one higher to angels is indeed none but God. Everything begins from Him and everything returns to Him."

English translations of the Encyclopedia of the Brethren of Purity were available from 1812, while Arabic manuscripts of the al-Fawz al-Asghar and The Epistles of Ikhwan al-Safa were also available at the University of Cambridge by the 19th century. These works likely had an influence on 19th-century evolutionists, and possibly Charles Darwin.

In the 14th century, Ibn Khaldun further developed the evolutionary ideas found in the Encyclopedia of the Brethren of Purity. The following statements from his 1377 work, the Muqaddimah, express evolutionary ideas:

We explained there that the whole of existence in (all) its simple and composite worlds is arranged in a natural order of ascent and descent, so that everything constitutes an uninterrupted continuum. The essences at the end of each particular stage of the worlds are by nature prepared to be transformed into the essence adjacent to them, either above or below them. This is the case with the simple material elements; it is the case with palms and vines, (which constitute) the last stage of plants, in their relation to snails and shellfish, (which constitute) the (lowest) stage of animals. It is also the case with monkeys, creatures combining in themselves cleverness and perception, in their relation to man, the being who has the ability to think and to reflect. The preparedness (for transformation) that exists on either side, at each stage of the worlds, is meant when (we speak about) their connection.

Plants do not have the same fineness and power that animals have. Therefore, the sages rarely turned to them. Animals are the last and final stage of the three permutations. Minerals turn into plants, and plants into animals, but animals cannot turn into anything finer than themselves.

Numerous other Islamic scholars and scientists, including the polymaths Ibn al-Haytham and Al-Khazini, discussed and developed these ideas. Translated into Latin, these works began to appear in the West after the Renaissance and may have influenced Western philosophy and science.

=== Phenomenology ===
The Ash'ari polymath Ibn al-Haytham (Alhacen) is considered a pioneer of phenomenology. He articulated a relationship between the physical and observable world and that of intuition, psychology and mental functions. His theories regarding knowledge and perception, linking the domains of science and religion, led to a philosophy of existence based on the direct observation of reality from the observer's point of view. Much of his thought on phenomenology was not further developed until the 20th century.

=== Philosophy of mind ===
The philosophy of mind was studied in medieval Islamic psychological thought, which refers to the study of the nafs (literally "self" or "psyche" in Arabic) in the Islamic world, particularly during the Islamic Golden Age (8th–15th centuries) as well as modern times (20th–21st centuries), and is related to psychology, psychiatry and the neurosciences.

=== Place and space ===
The Arab polymath al-Hasan Ibn al-Haytham (Alhazen; died c. 1041) presented a thorough mathematical critique and refutation of Aristotle's conception of place (topos) in his Risala/Qawl fi'l-makan (Treatise/Discourse on Place).

Aristotle's Physics (Book IV - Delta) stated that the place of something is the two-dimensional boundary of the containing body that is at rest and is in contact with what it contains. Ibn al-Haytham disagreed with this definition and demonstrated that place (al-makan) is the imagined (three-dimensional) void (al-khala' al-mutakhayyal) between the inner surfaces of the containing body. He showed that place was akin to space, foreshadowing Descartes's notion of place as space qua Extensio or even Leibniz's analysis situs. Ibn al-Haytham's mathematization of place rested on several geometric demonstrations, including his study on the sphere and other solids, which showed that the sphere (al-kura) is the largest in magnitude (volumetric) with respect to other geometric solids that have equal surface areas. For instance, a sphere that has an equal surface area to that of a cylinder, would be larger in (volumetric) magnitude than the cylinder; hence, the sphere occupies a larger place than that occupied by the cylinder; unlike what is entailed by Aristotle's definition of place: that this sphere and that cylinder occupy places that are equal in magnitude. Ibn al-Haytham rejected Aristotle's philosophical concept of place on mathematical grounds. Later, the philosopher 'Abd al-Latif al-Baghdadi (13th century) tried to defend the Aristotelian conception of place in a treatise titled: Fi al-Radd 'ala Ibn al-Haytham fi al-makan (A refutation of Ibn al-Haytham's place), although his effort was admirable from a philosophical standpoint, it was unconvincing from the scientific and mathematical viewpoints.

Ibn al-Haytham also discussed space perception and its epistemological implications in his Book of Optics (1021). His experimental proof of the intromission model of vision led to changes in the way the visual perception of space was understood, contrary to the previous emission theory of vision supported by Euclid and Ptolemy. In "tying the visual perception of space to prior bodily experience, Alhacen unequivocally rejected the intuitiveness of spatial perception and, therefore, the autonomy of vision. Without tangible notions of distance and size for correlation, sight can tell us next to nothing about such things."

== Philosophy of education ==
In the medieval Islamic world, an elementary school was known as a maktab, which dates back to at least the 10th century. Like madrasahs (which referred to higher education), a maktab was often attached to a mosque. In the 11th century, Ibn Sina (known as Avicenna in the West), in one of his books, wrote a chapter dealing with the maktab entitled "The Role of the Teacher in the Training and Upbringing of Children", as a guide to teachers working at maktab schools. He wrote that children can learn better if taught in classes instead of individual tuition from private tutors, and he gave a number of reasons for why this is the case, citing the value of competition and emulation among pupils as well as the usefulness of group discussions and debates. Ibn Sina described the curriculum of a maktab school in some detail, describing the curricula for two stages of education in a maktab school.

=== Primary education ===
Ibn Sina wrote that children should be sent to a maktab school from the age of 6 and be taught primary education until they reach the age of 14. During which time, he wrote that they should be taught the Qur'an, Islamic metaphysics, language, literature, Islamic ethics, and manual skills (which could refer to a variety of practical skills).

=== Secondary education ===
Ibn Sina refers to the secondary education stage of maktab schooling as the period of specialization, when pupils should begin to acquire manual skills, regardless of their social status. He writes that children after the age of 14 should be given a choice to choose and specialize in subjects they have an interest in, whether it was reading, manual skills, literature, preaching, medicine, geometry, trade and commerce, craftsmanship, or any other subject or profession they would be interested in pursuing for a future career. He wrote that this was a transitional stage and that there needs to be flexibility regarding the age in which pupils graduate, as the student's emotional development and chosen subjects need to be taken into account.

== Philosophy of science ==
=== Scientific method ===
The pioneering development of the scientific method by the Arab Ash'ari polymath Ibn al-Haytham (Alhacen) was an important contribution to the philosophy of science. In The Model of the Motions, Ibn al-Haytham also describes an early version of Occam's razor, where he employs only minimal hypotheses regarding the properties that characterize astronomical motions, as he attempts to eliminate from his planetary model the cosmological hypotheses that cannot be observed from Earth.

In his Aporias against Ptolemy, Ibn al-Haytham commented on the difficulty of attaining scientific knowledge:

"Truth is sought for itself [but] the truths, [he warns] are immersed in uncertainties [and the scientific authorities (such as Ptolemy, whom he greatly respected) are] not immune from error..."

He held that the criticism of existing theories — which dominated this book — holds a special place in the growth of scientific knowledge:

"Therefore, the seeker after the truth is not one who studies the writings of the ancients and, following his natural disposition, puts his trust in them, but rather the one who suspects his faith in them and questions what he gathers from them, the one who submits to argument and demonstration, and not to the sayings of a human being whose nature is fraught with all kinds of imperfection and deficiency. Thus the duty of the man who investigates the writings of scientists, if learning the truth is his goal, is to make himself an enemy of all that he reads, and, applying his mind to the core and margins of its content, attack it from every side. He should also suspect himself as he performs his critical examination of it, so that he may avoid falling into either prejudice or leniency."

Ibn al-Haytham attributed his experimental scientific method and scientific skepticism to his Islamic faith. He believed that human beings are inherently flawed and that only God is perfect. He reasoned that to discover the truth about nature, it is necessary to eliminate human opinion and error, and allow the universe to speak for itself. In The Winding Motion, Ibn al-Haytham further wrote that faith should only apply to prophets of Islam and not to any other authorities, in the following comparison between the Islamic prophetic tradition and the demonstrative sciences:

"From the statements made by the noble Shaykh, it is clear that he believes in Ptolemy's words in everything he says, without relying on a demonstration or calling on a proof, but by pure imitation (taqlid); that is how experts in the prophetic tradition have faith in Prophets, may the blessing of God be upon them. But it is not the way that mathematicians have faith in specialists in the demonstrative sciences."

Ibn al-Haytham described his search for truth and knowledge as a way of leading him closer to God:

"I constantly sought knowledge and truth, and it became my belief that for gaining access to the effulgence and closeness to God, there is no better way than that of searching for truth and knowledge."

His contemporary Abū Rayhān al-Bīrūnī also introduced an early scientific method in nearly every field of inquiry he studied. For example, in his treatise on mineralogy, Kitab al-Jamahir (Book of Precious Stones), he is "the most exact of experimental scientists", while in the introduction to his study of India, he declares that "to execute our project, it has not been possible to follow the geometric method" and develops comparative sociology as a scientific method in the field. He was also responsible for introducing the experimental method into mechanics, the first to conduct elaborate experiments related to astronomical phenomena, and a pioneer of experimental psychology.

Unlike his contemporary Avicenna's scientific method where "general and universal questions came first and led to experimental work", al-Biruni developed scientific methods where "universals came out of practical, experimental work" and "theories are formulated after discoveries." During his debate with Avicenna on natural philosophy, al-Biruni made the first real distinction between a scientist and a philosopher, referring to Avicenna as a philosopher and considering himself to be a mathematical scientist.

Al-Biruni's scientific method was similar to the modern scientific method in many ways, particularly his emphasis on repeated experimentation. Biruni was concerned with how to conceptualize and prevent both systematic errors and random errors, such as "errors caused by the use of small instruments and errors made by human observers." He argued that if instruments produce random errors because of their imperfections or idiosyncratic qualities, then multiple observations must be taken, analyzed qualitatively, and on this basis, arrive at a "common-sense single value for the constant sought", whether an arithmetic mean or a "reliable estimate."

=== Experimental medicine ===
Avicenna (Ibn Sina) is considered the father of modern medicine, for his introduction of experimental medicine and clinical trials, the experimental use and testing of drugs, and a precise guide for practical experimentation in the process of discovering and proving the effectiveness of medical substances, in his medical encyclopedia, The Canon of Medicine (11th century), which was the first book dealing with experimental medicine. It laid out the following rules and principles for testing the effectiveness of new drugs or medications, which still form the basis of modern clinical trials:

1. "The drug must be free from any extraneous accidental quality."
2. "It must be used on a simple, not a composite, disease."
3. "The drug must be tested with two contrary types of diseases, because sometimes a drug cures one disease by Its essential qualities and another by its accidental ones."
4. "The quality of the drug must correspond to the strength of the disease. For example, there are some drugs whose heat is less than the coldness of certain diseases, so that they would have no effect on them."
5. "The time of action must be observed, so that essence and accident are not confused."
6. "The effect of the drug must be seen to occur constantly or in many cases, for if this did not happen, it was an accidental effect."
7. "The experimentation must be done with the human body, for testing a drug on a lion or a horse might not prove anything about its effect on man."

=== Peer review ===
The first documented description of a peer review process is found in the Ethics of the Physician written by Ishaq bin Ali al-Rahwi (854–931) of al-Raha, Syria, who describes the first medical peer review process. His work, as well as later Arabic medical manuals, state that a visiting physician must always make duplicate notes of a patient's condition on every visit. When the patient was cured or had died, the notes of the physician were examined by a local medical council of other physicians, who would review the practising physician's notes to decide whether his/her performance have met the required standards of medical care. If their reviews were negative, the practicing physician could face a lawsuit from a maltreated patient.

== Other fields ==
=== Epistemology ===
Avicenna's most influential theory in epistemology is his theory of knowledge, in which he developed the concept of tabula rasa. He argued that the "human intellect at birth is rather like a tabula rasa, a pure potentiality that is actualized through education and comes to know" and that knowledge is attained through "empirical familiarity with objects in this world from which one abstracts universal concepts" which is developed through a "syllogistic method of reasoning; observations lead to prepositional statements, which when compounded lead to further abstract concepts."

In the 12th century, Ibn Tufail further developed the concept of tabula rasa in his Arabic novel, Hayy ibn Yaqzan, in which he depicted the development of the mind of a feral child "from a tabula rasa to that of an adult, in complete isolation from society" on a desert island. The Latin translation of his work, entitled Philosophus Autodidactus, published by Edward Pococke the Younger in 1671, had an influence on John Locke's formulation of tabula rasa in An Essay Concerning Human Understanding.

=== Eschatology ===
Islamic eschatology is concerned with the Qiyamah (end of the world; Last Judgement) and the final judgement of humanity. Eschatology relates to one of the six articles of faith (aqidah) of Islam. Like the other Abrahamic religions, Islam teaches the bodily resurrection of the dead, the fulfillment of a divine plan for creation, and the immortality of the human soul (though Jews do not necessarily view the soul as eternal); the righteous are rewarded with the pleasures of Jannah (Heaven), while the unrighteous are punished in Jahannam (Hell). A significant fraction (one third, in fact) of the Quran deals with these beliefs, with many hadith elaborating on the themes and details. Islamic apocalyptic literature describing the Armageddon is often known as fitna (a test) and malahim (or ghayba in the shi'ite tradition).

Ibn al-Nafis dealt with Islamic eschatology in some depth in his Theologus Autodidactus, where he rationalized the Islamic view of eschatology using reason and science to explain the events that would occur according to Islamic eschatology. He presented his rational and scientific arguments in the form of Arabic fiction, hence his Theologus Autodidactus may be considered the earliest science fiction work.

=== Legal philosophy ===
Sharia (شَرِيعَةٌ) refers to the body of Islamic law. The term means "way" or "path"; it is the legal framework within which public and some private aspects of life are regulated for those living in a legal system based on Islamic principles of jurisprudence. Fiqh is the term for Islamic jurisprudence, made up of the rulings of Islamic jurists. A component of Islamic studies, Fiqh expounds the methodology by which Islamic law is derived from primary and secondary sources.

Mainstream Islam distinguish fiqh, which means understanding details and inferences drawn by scholars, from sharia that refers to principles that lie behind the fiqh. Scholars hope that fiqh and sharia are in harmony in any given case, but they cannot be sure.

=== Philosophical novels ===
The Islamic philosophers, Ibn Tufail (Abubacer) and Ibn al-Nafis, were pioneers of the philosophical novel. Ibn Tufail wrote the first fictional Arabic novel Hayy ibn Yaqdhan (Philosophus Autodidactus) as a response to al-Ghazali's The Incoherence of the Philosophers, and then Ibn al-Nafis also wrote a fictional novel Theologus Autodidactus as a response to Ibn Tufail's Philosophus Autodidactus. Both of these novels had protagonists (Hayy in Philosophus Autodidactus and Kamil in Theologus Autodidactus) who were autodidactic individuals spontaneously generated in a cave and living in seclusion on a desert island, both being the earliest examples of a desert island story. However, while Hayy lives alone on the desert island for most of the story in Philosophus Autodidactus, the story of Kamil extends beyond the desert island setting in Theologus Autodidactus, developing into the first example of a science fiction novel.

Ibn al-Nafis described his book Theologus Autodidactus as a defense of "the system of Islam and the Muslims' doctrines on the missions of Prophets, the religious laws, the resurrection of the body, and the transitoriness of the world." He presents rational arguments for bodily resurrection and the immortality of the human soul, using both demonstrative reasoning and material from the hadith corpus to prove his case. Later Islamic scholars viewed this work as a response to the metaphysical claim of Avicenna and Ibn Tufail that bodily resurrection cannot be proven through reason, a view that was earlier criticized by al-Ghazali.

A Latin translation of Philosophus Autodidactus was published in 1671, prepared by Edward Pococke the Younger. The first English translation by Simon Ockley was published in 1708, and German and Dutch translations were also published at the time. Philosophus Autodidactus went on to have a significant influence on European literature, and became an influential best-seller throughout Western Europe in the 17th and 18th centuries. These translations later inspired Daniel Defoe to write Robinson Crusoe, which also featured a desert island narrative and was regarded as the first novel in English.

Philosophus Autodidactus also had a "profound influence" on modern Western philosophy. It became "one of the most important books that heralded the Scientific Revolution" and European Enlightenment, and the thoughts expressed in the novel can be found in "different variations and to different degrees in the books of Thomas Hobbes, John Locke, Isaac Newton, and Immanuel Kant." The novel inspired the concept of "tabula rasa" developed in An Essay Concerning Human Understanding (1690) by Locke, who was a student of Pococke. Philosophus Autodidactus also developed the themes of empiricism, tabula rasa, nature versus nurture, condition of possibility, materialism, and Molyneux's Problem. The novel also inspired Robert Boyle, another acquaintance of Pococke, to write his own philosophical novel set on an island, The Aspiring Naturalist. Other European scholars influenced by Philosophus Autodidactus include Gottfried Leibniz, Melchisédech Thévenot, John Wallis, Christiaan Huygens, George Keith, Robert Barclay, the Quakers, and Samuel Hartlib.

=== Political philosophy ===
Early Islamic political philosophy emphasized an inexorable link between science and religion, and the process of ijtihad to find truth - in effect all philosophy was "political" as it had real implications for governance. This view was challenged by the Mutazilite philosophers, who held a more secular view and were supported by secular aristocracy who sought freedom of action independent of the Caliphate. The only Greek political treatise known to medieval Muslims at the time was Plato's Republic. By the end of the Islamic Golden Age, however, the Asharite view of Islam had in general triumphed.

Islamic political philosophy, was, indeed, rooted in the very sources of Islam, i.e. the Qur'an and the Sunnah, the words and practices of Muhammad. However, in the Western thought, it is generally known that it was a specific area peculiar merely to the great philosophers of Islam: al-Kindi (Alkindus), al-Farabi (Alfarabi), İbn Sina (Avicenna), Ibn Bajjah (Avempace), Ibn Rushd (Averroes), and Ibn Khaldun. The political conceptions of Islam such as kudrah, sultan, ummah, cemaa -and even the "core" terms of the Qur'an, i.e. ibada, din, rab and ilah- is taken as the basis of an analysis. Hence, not only the ideas of the Muslim political philosophers but also many other jurists and ulama posed political ideas and theories. For example, the ideas of the Khawarij in the very early years of Islamic history on Khilafa and Ummah, or that of Shia Islam on the concept of Imamah are considered proofs of political thought. The clashes between the Ehl-i Sunna and Shia in the 7th and 8th centuries had a genuine political character.

The 14th-century Arab scholar Ibn Khaldun is considered one of the greatest political theorists. The British philosopher-anthropologist Ernest Gellner considered Ibn Khaldun's definition of government, "an institution which prevents injustice other than such as it commits itself", the best in the history of political theory.

== See also ==
- Islamic philosophy
  - Modern Islamic philosophy
- Islamic science
- Islamic Golden Age
- Peripatetic school
- Sufi philosophy
