= Ibn al-Nafis =

Arab polymath and physician (1213–1288)

- ابن النفيس
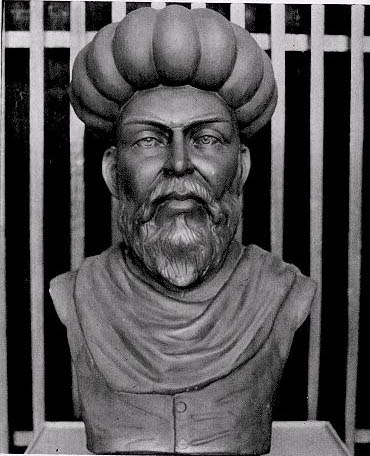

Personal life
- Born: 607 AH (1210/1211 CE) Damascus, Ayyubid Sultanate
- Died: 687 AH (1288/1289 CE) Cairo, Mamluk Sultanate
- Era: Islamic Golden Age
- Region: Syria and Egypt
- Main interests: medicine; surgery; physiology; anatomy; biology; Islamic studies; jurisprudence; philosophy
- Notable work: Commentary on Anatomy in Avicenna's Canon

Religious life
- Religion: Islam
- Jurisprudence: Shafi'i
- Creed: Ash'ari

Muslim leader
- Influenced by: Al-Ghazali, Hippocrates, Galen, Hunayn Ibn Ishaq, Avicenna, al-Zahrawi
- Influenced: Abu Hayyan Al Gharnati

ʿAlāʾ al-Dīn Abū al-Ḥasan ʿAlī ibn Abī Ḥazm al-Qarashī (Arabic: علاء الدين أبو الحسن عليّ بن أبي حزم القرشي; c. 1210/1211 - 1288/1289 CE), known as Ibn al-Nafīs (Arabic: ابن النفيس), was an Arab polymath whose areas of work included medicine, surgery, physiology, anatomy, biology, Islamic studies, jurisprudence, and philosophy. He is known for being the first to describe the pulmonary circulation of the blood. The work of Ibn al-Nafis regarding the right sided (pulmonary) circulation pre-dates the later work (1628) of William Harvey's De motu cordis. Both theories attempt to explain circulation. The 2nd century Greek physician Galen's theory about the physiology of the circulatory system remained unchallenged until the works of Ibn al-Nafis, who has therefore been described as "the father of circulatory physiology".

As an early anatomist, Ibn al-Nafis also performed several human dissections during the course of his work, making several important discoveries in the fields of physiology and anatomy. Besides his famous discovery of the pulmonary circulation, he also gave an early insight of the coronary and capillary circulations. He was also appointed as the chief physician at al-Naseri Hospital founded by Sultan Saladin. Due to his discoveries, he has been described by some as “the second Avicenna”.

Apart from medicine, Ibn al-Nafis studied jurisprudence, literature and theology. He was an expert on the Shafi'i school of jurisprudence and an expert physician. The number of medical textbooks written by Ibn al-Nafis is estimated at more than 110 volumes.

== Biography ==
Ibn al-Nafis was born between 1210 and 1213 to an Arab family in Damascus. The origin of his nisba, "al-Qurashi", has been discussed by various historians. Some accounts suggest it is derived from a village named "al-Qurashiyya" (or Karashia) near Damascus. However, the prevailing view among authoritative biographers is that the name signifies his tribal descent from the Quraysh, specifically the Banu Makhzum clan, as historical geographical surveys have not verified the existence of such a village. Early in his life, he studied theology, philosophy and literature. Then, at the age of 16, he started studying medicine for more than ten years at the Nuri Hospital in Damascus, which was founded by the Turkoman emir of Aleppo and Damascus, Nur-al Din Muhmud ibn Zanki, in the 12th century. He was contemporary with the famous Arab physician Ibn Abi Usaibia and they both were taught by the founder of a medical school in Damascus, Al-Dakhwar. Ibn Abi Usaibia does not mention Ibn al-Nafis at all in his biographical dictionary "Lives of the Physicians". The seemingly intentional omission could be due to personal animosity or maybe rivalry between the two physicians.

In 1236, Ibn al-Nafis, along with some of his colleagues, moved to Egypt under the request of the Ayyubid sultan al-Kamil. Ibn al-Nafis was appointed as the chief physician at al-Naseri hospital which was founded by Saladin, where he taught and practiced medicine for several years. One of his most notable students was the famous Christian physician Ibn al-Quff. Ibn al-Nafis also taught jurisprudence at al-Masruriyya Madrassa (Arabic: المدرسة المسرورية). His name is found among those of other scholars, which gives insight into how well he was regarded in the study and practice of religious law.

Ibn al-Nafis lived most of his life in Egypt, and witnessed several pivotal events like the fall of Baghdad and the rise of Mamluks. He even became the personal physician of the sultan Baibars and other prominent political leaders, thus showcasing himself as an authority among practitioners of medicine. Later in his life, when he was 74 years old, Ibn al-Nafis was appointed as the chief physician of the newly founded al-Mansori hospital where he worked for the rest of his life.

Ibn al-Nafis died in Cairo after some days of sickness. His student Safi Abu al-Fat'h composed a poem about him. Prior to his death, he donated his house and library to Qalawun Hospital or, as it was also known, the House of Recovery.

== Writings ==
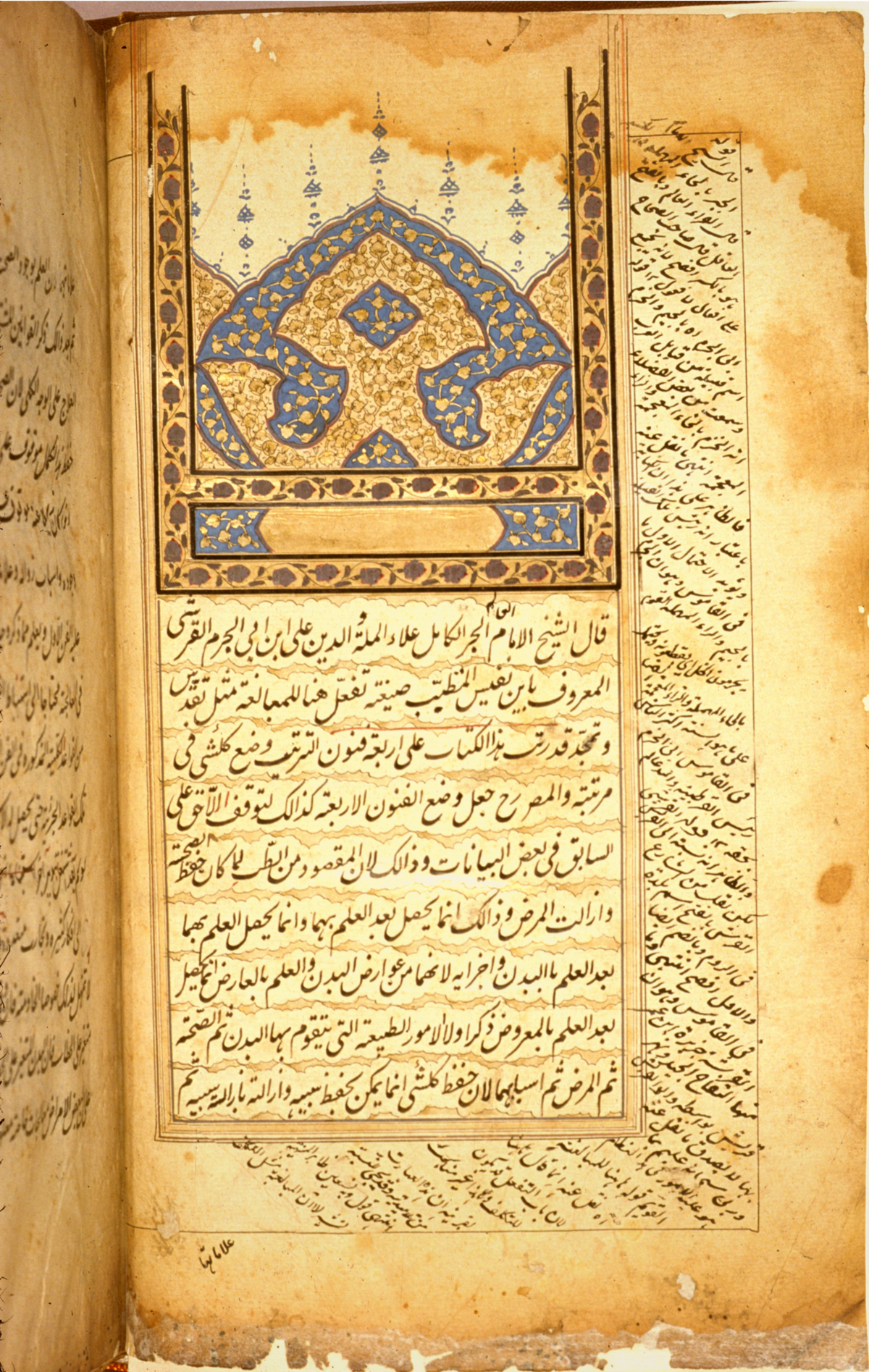
The opening page of one of Ibn al-Nafis' medical works. This is probably a copy made in India during the 17th or 18th century.

=== The Comprehensive Book on Medicine ===
The most voluminous of his books is Al-Shamil fi al-Tibb (The Comprehensive Book on Medicine), which was planned to be an encyclopedia comprising 300 volumes. However, Ibn al-Nafis managed to publish only 80 before his death, and the work was left incomplete. Despite this fact, the work is considered one of the largest medical encyclopedias ever written by one person, and it gave a complete summary of the medical knowledge in the Islamic world at the time. Ibn al-Nafis bequeathed his encyclopedia along with all of his library to the Mansoory hospital where he had worked before his death.

Along the time, much of the encyclopedia volumes got lost or dispersed all over the world with only 2 volumes still being extant in Egypt. The Egyptian scholar Youssef Ziedan started a project of collecting and examining the extant manuscripts of this work that are cataloged in many libraries around the world, including the Cambridge University Library, the Bodleian Library, and the Lane Medical Library at Stanford University.

=== Commentary on Anatomy in Ibn Sina's Canon ===
Sharh Tashrih al-Qanun ("Commentary on Anatomy in Books I and II of Ibn Sina's Kitab al-Qanun"), published when Ibn al-Nafis was only 29 years old, still it is regarded by many as his most famous work. While it did not prove to be as popular as his medical encyclopedia in the Islamic circles, the book is of great interest today specially for science historians who are mostly concerned with its celebrated discovery of the pulmonary circulation.

The book discusses the anatomical concepts of Avicenna's Canon. It starts with a preface in which Ibn al-Nafis talks about the importance of the anatomical knowledge for the physician, and the vital relationship between anatomy and physiology. He then proceeds to discuss the anatomy of the body which he divides into two types; the general anatomy which is the anatomy of the bones, muscles, nerves, veins and arteries; and special anatomy which is concerned with the internal parts of the body like the heart and lungs.

What distinguish the book most is the confident language which Ibn al-Nafis shows throughout the text and his boldness to challenge the most established medical authorities of the time like Galen and Avicenna. Ibn al-Nafis, thus, was one of the few medieval physicians—if not the only one—who contributed noticeably to the science of physiology and tried to push it beyond the hatch of the Greco-Roman tradition.

=== Commentary on Hippocrates' "Nature of Man" ===
The particular manuscript of Ibn al-Nafis' commentary on Hippocrates' Nature of Man is preserved by the National Library of Medicine. It is unique and significant because it is the only recorded copy that contains the commentary from Ibn al-Nafïs on the Hippocratic treatise on the Nature of Man. Al-Nafïs's commentary on the Nature of Man is found in Sharh Tabi'at al-Insan li-Burqrat. It offers an idea of medical education during this period, in the form of an ijaza included with the text. This document reveals that Ibn al-Nafïs had a student named of Shams al-Dawlah Abü al-Fadi ibn Abï al-Hasan al-Masïhï, who successfully read and mastered a reading course associated with the treatise, after which al-Masïhï received this license from Ibn al-Nafïs. Based on evidence from commentaries such as this one, modern scholars know that physicians in this era received a license when they completed a particular part of their training.

=== Commentary on "Endemics" ===
In the second half of the thirteenth century, Ibn al-Nafïs composed the first Arabic commentary on Hippocrates' Endemics. The commentary is lengthy and contains two extant manuscripts, made up of 200 and 192 folios. Ibn al-Nafïs’ commentary on Hippocrates’ Endemics in Sharh Abidhimya li-Burqrat is an analysis of Hippocrates three constitutions. Al-Nafïs revisited the cases of illnesses described by Hippocrates in his text, while comparing and contrasting those cases to his own cases and conclusions. In his commentary, al-Nafïs emphasized disease outbreaks. In one example, he compared a particular outbreak of malnutrition in Damascus, Syria, to an outbreak described by Hippocrates. Like Hippocrates, al-Nafïs constructed an outbreak map and both men concluded that Damascus was the origin of the outbreak. This method of locating an outbreak origin was used by John Snow 600 years later, when he constructed his own outbreak map.

=== Other works ===
Ibn al-Nafis also wrote a number of books and commentaries on different topics including on medicine, law, logic, philosophy, theology, grammar and environment. His commentaries include one on Hippocrates' book, several volumes on Avicenna's The Canon of Medicine, and a commentary on Hunayn Ibn Ishaq.

- al-Mūjaz fī al-Tibb (“A Summary of Medicine”); a short outline of medicine which was very popular among Arab physicians and got translated into Turkish and Hebrew.
- Kitāb al-Mukhtār fī al-Aghḏiyah (“The Choice of Foodstuffs”); a largely original contribution which was on the effects of diet on health.
- Bughyat al-Tālibīn wa Hujjat al-Mutaṭabbibīn (“Reference Book for Physicians”); a reference book for physicians containing his general knowledge to aid physicians in the diagnosis of disease, treatment of illness, and execution of surgical procedures.
- al-Muhaḏḏab fī al-Kuhl (“Polished Book on ophthalmology”); an original book on ophthalmology. Ibn al-Nafis made this book to polish and build off of concepts in ophthalmology originally made by Masawaiyh and Ibn Ishaq.
- Sharḥ Masā’il Hunayn (“Commentary on Hunayn Ibn Ishaq's Questions”).
- al-Risālah al-Kāmiliyyah fī al-Ssīrah al-Nabawiyyah; (“Theologus Autodidactus”); a Philosophical treatise that is claimed by some to be the first theological novel.

== Anatomical discoveries ==
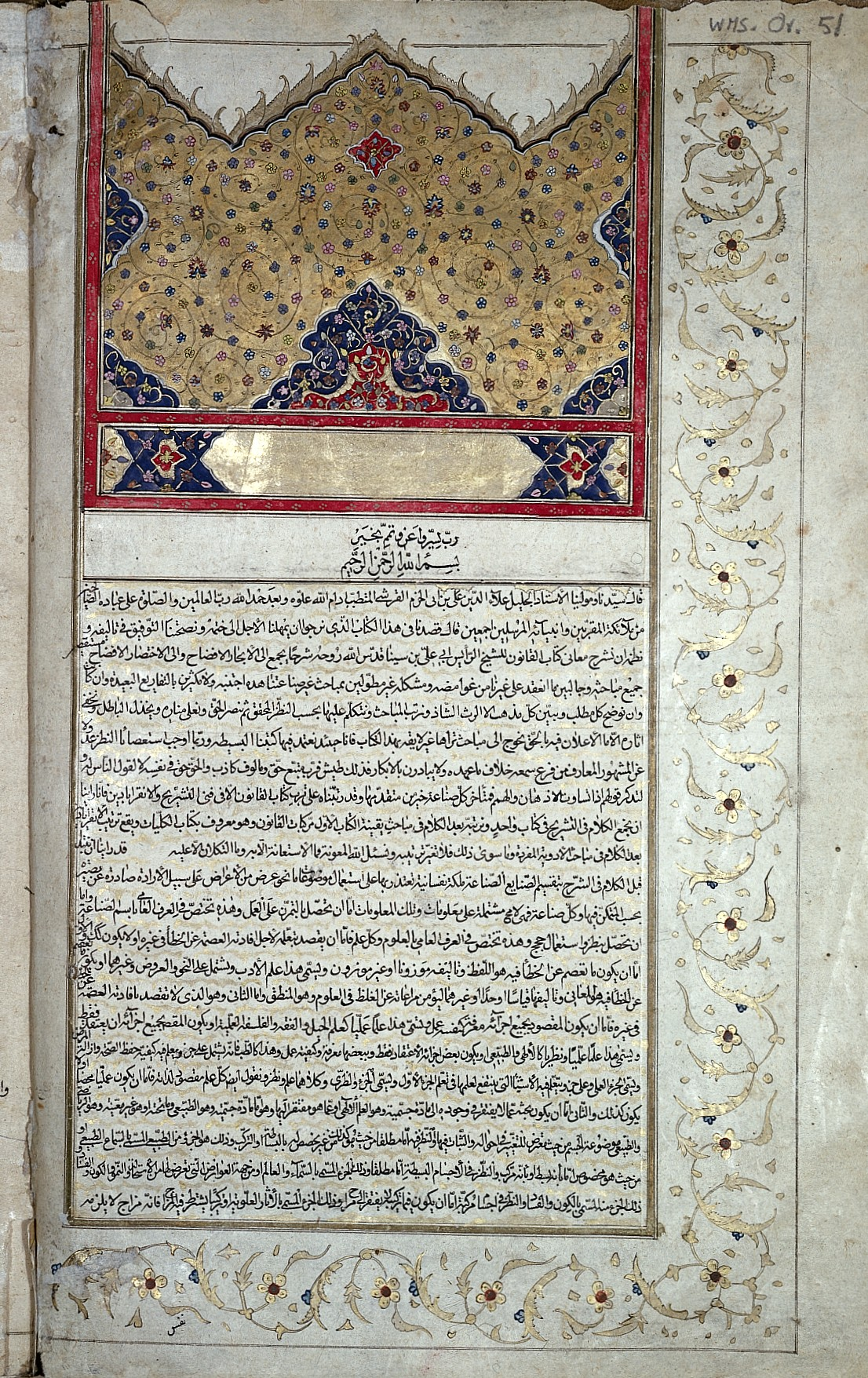
A manuscript page from Ibn al-Nafis' Commentary on Avicenna's Canon

In 1924, Egyptian physician, Muhyo Al-Deen Altawi, discovered a manuscript entitled, Sharh tashrih al-qanun li’ Ibn Sina, or "Commentary on Anatomy in Avicenna's Canon" in the Prussian State Library in Berlin while studying the history of Arabic Medicine at the medical faculty of Albert Ludwig's University. This manuscript covers in detail the topics of anatomy, pathology, and physiology. This is the earliest description of pulmonary circulation.

=== Pulmonary circulation ===
The most commonly accepted theory of cardiac function prior to Ibn al-Nafis was that of Galen. Galen taught that the blood reaching the right side of the heart went through invisible pores in the cardiac septum, to the left side of the heart, where it mixed with air to create spirit, and was then distributed to the body. According to Galen, the venous system was separate from the arterial system except when they came in contact through the unseen pores.

The newly discovered manuscript of Ibn al-Nafis was translated by Max Meyerhof. It included critiques of Galen's theory, including a discussion on the pores of the heart. Based on animal dissection, Galen hypothesized porosity in the septum in order for blood to travel within the heart as well as additional help on the part of the lungs. However, he could not observe these pores and so thought they were too small to see. “Ibn al-Nafīs's critiques were the result of two processes: an intensive theoretical study of medicine, physics, and theology in order to fully understand the nature of the living body and its soul; and an attempt to verify physiological claims through observation, including dissection of animals.” Ibn al-Nafis rejected Galen's theory in the following passage:

The blood, after it has been refined in the right cavity, must be transmitted to the left cavity where the (vital) spirit is generated. But there is no passage between these cavities, for the substance of the heart is solid in this region and has neither a visible passage, as was thought by some persons, nor an invisible one which could have permitted the transmission of blood, as was alleged by Galen.

He posited that the "pores" of the heart are closed, that there is no passage between the two chambers, and the substance of the heart is thick. Instead, Ibn al-Nafis hypothesized that blood rose into the lungs via the arterial vein and then circulated into the left cavity of the heart. He also believed that blood (spirit) and air passes from the lung to the left ventricle and not in the opposite direction. Some points that conflict with Ibn al-Nafis' are that there are only two ventricles instead of three (Aristotle's, 4th century BC) and that the ventricle gets its energy from the blood flowing in the vessels running in the coronary vessels, not from blood deposited in the right ventricle.

Based on his anatomical knowledge, Ibn al-Nafis stated:

Blood from the right chamber of the heart must arrive at the left chamber, but there is no direct pathway between them. The thick septum of the heart is not perforated and does not have visible pores as some people thought or invisible pores as Galen thought. The blood from the right chamber must flow through the vena arteriosa (pulmonary artery) to the lungs, spread through its substances, be mingled there with air, pass through the arteria venosa (pulmonary vein) to reach the left chamber of the heart, and there form the vital spirit....

Elsewhere in this work, he said:

The heart has only two ventricles...and between these two there is absolutely no opening. Also dissection gives this lie to what they said, as the septum between these two cavities is much thicker than elsewhere. The benefit of this blood (that is in the right cavity) is to go up to the lungs, mix with what air is in the lungs, then pass through the arteria venosa to the left cavity of the two cavities of the heart; and of that mixture is created the animal spirit.

=== Coronary circulation ===
Ibn al-Nafis also postulated that nutrients for heart are extracted from the coronary arteries:

Again his [Avicenna's] statement that the blood that is in the right side is to nourish the heart is not true at all, for the nourishment to the heart is from the blood that goes through the vessels that permeate the body of the heart.

=== Capillary circulation ===
Ibn al-Nafis had an insight into what would become a larger theory of the capillary circulation. He stated that "there must be small communications or pores (manafidh in Arabic) between the pulmonary artery and vein," a prediction that preceded the discovery of the capillary system by more than 400 years. Ibn al-Nafis' theory, however, was confined to blood transit in the lungs and did not extend to the entire body:

For this reason the arterious vein has solid substance with two layers, in order to make more refined that (the blood) which transsudes from it. The venous artery, on the other hand, has thin substance in order to facilitate the reception of the transsuded [blood] from the vein in question. And for the same reason there exists perceptible passages (or pores) between the two [blood vessels].

=== Pulsation ===
Ibn al-Nafis also disagreed with Galen's theory that the heart's pulse is created by the arteries’ tunics. He believed that "the pulse was a direct result of the heartbeat, even observing that the arteries contracted and expanded at different times depending upon their distance from the heart. He also correctly observed that the arteries contract when the heart expands and expand when the heart contracts.

=== Lungs ===
In describing the anatomy of the lungs, Ibn al-Nafis said:

The lungs are composed of parts, one of which is the bronchi; the second, the branches of the arteria venosa; and the third, the branches of the vena arteriosa, all of them connected by loose porous flesh.....The need of the lungs for the vena arteriosa is to transport to it the blood that has been thinned and warmed in the heart, so that what seeps through the pores of the branches of this vessel into the alveoli of the lungs may mix with what there is of air therein and combine with it, the resultant composite becoming fit to be spirit when this mixing takes place in the left cavity of the heart. The mixture is carried to the left cavity by the arteria venosa.

It is also found that "In the lungs, some blood was filtered through the two tunics (coverings) of the vessel that brought blood to the lungs from the heart. Ibn al-Nafīs called this vessel the ‘artery-like vein’, but we now call it the pulmonary artery."

=== Brain ===
Ibn al-Nafis was also one of the few physicians at the time, who supported the view that the brain, rather than the heart, was the organ responsible for thinking and sensation.

== Other medical contributions ==
=== Practice of dissection ===
There is some debate about whether or not Ibn al-Nafis participated in dissection to come to his conclusions about pulmonary circulation. Although he states in his writings that he was prevented from practicing dissection because of his beliefs, other scholars have noted that Ibn al-Nafis must have either practiced dissection or seen a human heart in order to come to his conclusions. According to one view, his knowledge about the human heart could have been derived from surgical operations rather than dissection. Other comments found in Ibn al-Nafis' writings such as dismissing earlier observations with a reference to dissection as proof, however, support the view that he practiced dissection in order to come to his conclusions about the human heart and pulmonary circulation. Ibn al-Nafis' comments to the contrary and the alternate explanations, however, keep his possible practice of dissection in question.

During Ibn al-Nafis’ studies of the human body, there remains controversy whether he performed dissection, as dissection was mentioned in any texts on jurisprudence or Islamic tradition, and there was no concrete prohibition. Though many scholars would argue that Ibn al-Nafis would have needed to perform dissection to be able to see pulmonary circulation. Greek physician, Aelius Galenus' book, “On the Usefulness of the Parts”, explicitly tells his readers to rely on dissection for anatomical knowledge and not rely on books. Thus would give an indication that dissection was not some otherworldly idea but had been looked as an opportunity to better one's knowledge of the human body.

In the “Commentary of the anatomy of the Canon of Avicenna”, human anatomy experts such as Patrice Le Floch-Prigent and Dominique Delaval, concluded that Ibn al-Nafis used clinical, physiological, and dissection results in discovering and describing the pulmonary heart circulation in humans. Through their study on the “Commentary of the anatomy of the Canon of Avicenna”, they both concluded that Nafis did indeed use dissection to acquire his results, even though the practice of dissection was banned in Muslim tradition.

=== Urology ===
In his book "Al-Mugiza", Ibn al-Nafis distinguishes the difference between kidney stone and bladder stones. He does this by their pathogenesis and clinical picture. He also discussed the difference between kidney and bladder infections, different types of inflammatory and noninflammatory renal swellings, the conservative management of renal stones and commonly used and well known lithontriptic medicaments.

=== Surgery ===
In his Kitab al-Shamil, Ibn al-Nafis gives insight into his view of medicine and human relations. His surgical technique had three stages. Step one which he calls "the stage of presentation for clinical diagnosis" was to give the patient information on how it was to be performed and the knowledge it was based on. Second "the operative stage" was to perform the surgery itself. The final step was to have a post-surgery appointment and a routine of checkups which he calls "the postoperative period". There is also a description of a surgeon's responsibility when working with nurses, patients, or other surgeons.

=== Metabolism ===
Ibn al-Nafis is also credited with providing the earliest recorded reference for the concept of metabolism:

Both the body and its parts are in a continuous state of dissolution and nourishment, so they are inevitably undergoing permanent change.

== Theology ==
Ibn al-Nafis' philosophical views are mostly known from his philosophical novel, Theologus Autodidactus. The novel touches upon a variety of philosophical subjects like cosmology, empiricism, epistemology, experimentation, futurology, eschatology, and natural philosophy. It deals with these themes and others through the story of a feral child on a desert island, and the development of his mind after contact with the outside world.

The plot of Theologus Autodidactus was intended to be a response to Ibn Tufail (Abubacer), who wrote the first Arabic novel Hayy ibn Yaqdhan (Philosophus Autodidactus) which was itself a response to al-Ghazali's The Incoherence of the Philosophers. Ibn al-Nafis thus wrote the narrative of Theologus Autodidactus as a rebuttal of Abubacer's arguments in Philosophus Autodidactus.

Ibn al-Nafis described his book Theologus Autodidactus as a defense of "the system of Islam and the Muslims' doctrines on the missions of Prophets, the religious laws, the resurrection of the body, and the transitoriness of the world." He presents rational arguments for bodily resurrection and the immortality of the human soul, using both demonstrative reasoning and material from the hadith corpus to prove his case. Later Islamic scholars viewed this work as a response to the metaphysical claim of Avicenna and Ibn Tufail that bodily resurrection cannot be proven through reason, a view that was earlier criticized by al-Ghazali.

Unlike Avicenna who supported Aristotle's idea of the soul originating from the heart, Ibn al-Nafis on the other hand rejected this idea and instead argued that the soul "is related to the entirety and not to one or a few organs." He further criticized Aristotle's idea that every unique soul requires the existence of a unique source, in this case the heart. Ibn al-Nafis concluded that "the soul is related primarily neither to the spirit nor to any organ, but rather to the entire matter whose temperament is prepared to receive that soul" and he defined the soul as nothing other than "what a human indicates by saying ‘I’."

Ibn al-Nafis dealt with Islamic eschatology in some depth in his Theologus Autodidactus, where he rationalized the Islamic view of eschatology using reason and science to explain the events that would occur according to Islamic tradition. He presented his rational and scientific arguments in the form of Arabic fiction, hence his Theologus Autodidactus may be considered the earliest science fiction work.

== Possible Western influence ==
There is currently debate over whether Ibn al-Nafis influenced later Western anatomists such as Realdo Columbo and William Harvey. In AD 1344, Kazrouny wrote a verbatim copy of Ibn al-Nafis' commentary on Canon in his Sharh al-Kulliyat. In AD 1500, Andrea Alpago returned to Italy after studying in Damascus. In Alpago's 1547 A.D. publication of Libellus de removendis nocumentis, quae accident in regimime sanitatis, there is a Latin translation containing part of Ibn al-Nafis' commentary on pharmacopeia. This was published in Venice during its rule over Padua. Harvey arrived in Padua in AD 1597.

The debate currently turns on whether these events are causally connected or are historical coincidences.

== Legacy ==
Ibn al-Nafis’ mastery of medical sciences, his prolific writings, and also his image as a devout religious scholar left a positive impression on later Muslim biographers and historians, even among conservative ones like al-Dhahabi. He had been described as the greatest physician of his time, with some even referring to him as "the second Ibn Sina".

Years before Ibn al-Nafis was born, Galenic physiology and anatomy dominated the Arabic medical tradition from the time of Hunayn ibn Ishaq (AD 809–873). Medical authorities at the time seldom challenged the underlying principles of this system. What set Al-Nafis apart as a physician was his boldness in challenging Galen's work. In studying yet criticizing the Galenic system, he formed his own medical hypotheses.

Ibn al-Nafis importance in the history of medicine was not fully recognized in the western circles until quite recently. The majority of his works remained unknown in the west until their re-discovery at the beginning of the 20th century. Since then, a new evaluation of his work has been carried out, with a specific appreciation being given to his physiological observations which were ahead of their time.

For science historians, Ibn al-Nafis is sometimes regarded as "the greatest physiologist of the Middle Ages". George Sarton, in his "Introduction to the History of Science", written about the time Ibn al-Nafis's theory had just been discovered, said:

If the authenticity of Ibn al-Nafis' theory is confirmed his importance will increase enormously; for he must then be considered one of the main forerunners of William Harvey and the greatest physiologist of the Middle Ages.

In 2023, Egyptian publishing house "Dar Al-Sherouk" published "The Papermaker" or (in Arabic: الوراق), a novel by Egyptian writer Youssef Zidane, the novel tell the real story of Ibn a-Nafis life, following The Crusades campaign against Damietta and northern Egypt, the Mongol invasion and the fall of Baghdad at the hands of Hulagu, the power struggles between the last generation of Ayyubids and the first generation of Mamluk rulers, the fierce clashes between Qutuz, Baybars and Qalawun... and "Al-Ala Ibn al-Nafis" between all that, who was close to all of that, as he was the personal physician of al-Zahir Baybars, and the chief physician of Egypt and the Levant. Zidane's novel was received well among Egyptian and Arabic readers, as Zidane reintroduced Ibn al-Nafis as a human and an important historical figure. The novel got translated into Persian by Seyyed Hamidreza Mohajerani. As of 2025, there's no English translation.

== See also ==
- List of Arab scientists and scholars
- List of Ash'aris and Maturidis
- Medicine in medieval Islam
- Theologus Autodidactus
