= Al-Dakhwar =

13th-century Arab physician

- Title: Ra'is al-Tibb ("Chief of Medicine")

Personal life
- Born: 1170 CE
- Died: 1230 CE
- Era: Ayyubid
- Region: Egypt and Syria
- Main interest: Medicine

Religious life
- Religion: Islam

Muslim leader
- Influenced: Ibn al-Nafis, Ibn Abi Usaibia

Muhadhdhabuddin Abd al-Rahim bin Ali bin Hamid al-Dimashqi (Arabic: مهذب الدين عبد الرحيم بن علي بن حامد الدمشقي) known as al-Dakhwar (Arabic: الدخوار) (1170–1230) was a leading Arab physician who served various rulers of the Ayyubid dynasty. He was also administratively responsible for medicine in Cairo and Damascus. Al-Dakhwar educated or influenced most of the prominent physicians of Egypt and Syria in the century, including writer Ibn Abi Usaibia and Ibn al-Nafis, the discoverer of blood circulation in the human body.

== Early life ==
Al-Dakhwar was born and brought up in Damascus as the son of an oculist. Initially, he too was an oculist at the Nuri Hospital of Damascus, but afterward he studied medicine with Ibn al-Matran.

== Physician of the Ayyubids ==
In 1208, al-Adil, the Sultan of Egypt, told his vizier al-Sahib ibn Shukur, that he was in need of another physician with the equivalent skill of the chief of medicine at the time, Abd al-Aziz al-Sulami. Al-Adil believed that al-Sulami was busy enough serving as physician of the army. Ibn Shukur recommended al-Dakhwar for the post and offered him 30 dinars a month. Al-Dakhwar turned him down, citing that al-Sulami receives 100 dinars a month and stating "I know my ability in this field and I will not take less!" Al-Sulami died on June 7 and soon after al-Dakhwar himself came into contact with al-Adil, and the latter was greatly impressed by him. He not only appointed him as his personal physician, but also as one of his confidants.

When al-Adil died, his son and successor in Damascus, al-Mu'azzam, made him chief superintendent of the Nasiri Hospital. There he wrote books and gave lectures on medicine to his students. Later, when al-Adil's other son al-Ashraf annexed Damascus after al-Mu'azzam died, al-Dakhwar was promoted as chief medical officer of the Ayyubid state.

== Books ==
=== Medicine ===
- al-Janinah ("The Embryo")
- Sharh Taqdimat-il-Ma'rifah ("Commentary on the Introduction of Knowledge")
- Mukhtasar-ul-Hawl-il-Razi ("Resume of al-Hawi by al-Razi")

=== Poetry ===
- Kitab ul-Aghani (a summarized version of "The Book of Songs" by al-Isfahani)

== Bibliography ==
- Ali, Abdul (1996), Islamic Dynasties of the Arab East: State and Civilization During the Later Medieval Times, M.D. Publications Pvt. Ltd, ISBN 978-81-7533-008-5
- Meyerhof, Max; Schacht, Joseph (1968), The Theologus autodidactus of Ibn al-Nafīs, Clarendon Publications
- Mahfuz, Najib (1935), The History of Medical Education in Egypt, Govt. Press, Bulâq
- Leiser, Gary; al-Khaledy, Nouri (2004), Questions and answers for physicians: a medieval Arabic study manual by ʻAbd al-ʻAzīz Al-Sulamī, BRILL, ISBN 978-90-04-13671-7
