= Ibn Tufayl =

Arab Andalusian Muslim polymath (c. 1105–1185)

- ابن طفيل
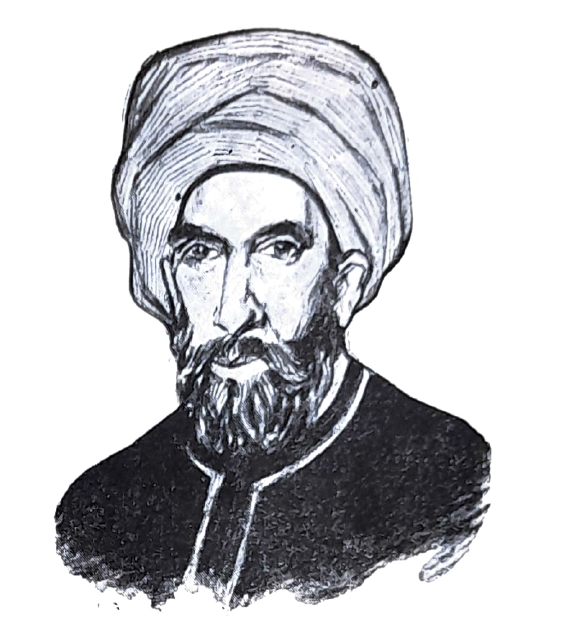
- A sketch representing Ibn Tufayl from a book entitled Sayr mulhimah: min al-Sharq wa-al-Gharb by unknown author, 1961
- Title: Ibn Tufayl; Abubacer Aben Tofail; Abu Jaafar Ebn Tophail; Avetophail

Personal life
- Born: 1105 Guadix, Andalusia, Almoravid dynasty
- Died: 1185 (aged 79–80) Marrakesh, Almohad Caliphate
- Era: Islamic Golden Age
- Region: Al-Andalus
- Main interest(s): Early Islamic philosophy, literature, kalam, Islamic medicine
- Notable idea(s): Wrote the first philosophical novel, which was also the first novel to depict desert island, feral child and coming of age plots, and introduced the concepts of autodidacticism and tabula rasa
- Notable work(s): Hayy ibn Yaqdhan (Philosophus Autodidactus)
- Occupation: Muslim scholar

Religious life
- Religion: Islam
- Creed: Avicennism

Muslim leader
- Influenced by: Plato, Aristotle, Al-Farabi, Avicenna, Avicennism, Ibn Tumart, Ibn Bajjah, Abu Yaqub Yusuf, Muhammad
- Influenced: Averroes, Alpetragius, Ibn al-Nafis

Ibn Ṭufayl (Note: Full Arabic name: أبو بكر محمد بن عبد الملك بن محمد بن طفيل القيسي الأندلسي ʾAbū Bakr Muḥammad bin ʿAbd al-Malik bin Muḥammad bin Ṭufayl al-Qaysiyy al-ʾAndalusiyy; Latinized form: Abubacer Aben Tofail; Anglicized form: Abubekar or Abu Jaafar Ebn Tophail) (c. 1105 – 1185) was an Arab Andalusian Muslim polymath: a writer, physician, philosopher, theologian, astronomer, and vizier. As a philosopher and novelist, he is most famous for writing the first philosophical novel, Hayy ibn Yaqdhan, considered a major work of Arabic literature emerging from Al-Andalus. As a physician, he was an early supporter of dissection and autopsy, which was expressed in his novel.

== Life ==
Born in Guadix, near Granada, Ibn Tufayl was educated by the scholar Ibn Bajjah (Avempace). His family were from the Arab Qays tribe. He was a secretary for several leaders, including the rulers of Ceuta and Tangier, in 1154. He also served as a secretary for the ruler of Granada, and later as vizier and physician for Abu Yaqub Yusuf, the Almohad caliph, to whom he recommended Ibn Rushd (Averroës) as his own future successor in 1169. Ibn Rushd later reports this event and describes how Ibn Tufayl then inspired him to write his famous Aristotelian commentaries:

Abu Bakr ibn Tufayl summoned me one day and told me that he had heard the Commander of the Faithful complaining about the disjointedness of Aristotle's mode of expression — or that of the translators — and the resultant obscurity of his intentions. He said that if someone took on these books who could summarize them and clarify their aims after first thoroughly understanding them himself, people would have an easier time comprehending them. "If you have the energy," Ibn Tufayl told me, "you do it. I'm confident you can because I know what a good mind and devoted character you have, and how dedicated you are to the art. You understand that only my great age, the cares of my office — and my commitment to another task that I think even more vital — keep me from doing it myself."

Ibn Rushd became Ibn Tufayl's successor after he retired in 1182; Ibn Tufayl died several years later in Morocco in 1185. The astronomer Nur Ed-Din Al-Bitruji was also a disciple of Ibn Tufayl. Al-Bitruji was influenced by him to follow the Aristotelian system of astronomy, as he had originally followed the Ptolemaic system of astronomy.

His work in astronomy was historically significant as he played a major role in overturning the Ptolemaic ideas on astronomy. This event in history is called the "Andalusian Revolt", where he influenced many, including Al-Bitruji, to desert the Ptolemaic ideas. He was influential in the development of Islamic astronomy. Many later astronomers and scholars built upon his ideas and used his work as a basis for their own research and discoveries.

Many Islamic philosophers, writers, physicians, and astronomers have been influenced by Ibn Tufayl and his work. These people include Nur al-Din al-Bitruji, Ibn al-Abbar, Abd al-Wahid al-Marrakushi, Ahmed Mohammed al-Maqqari, and Ibn al-Khatib.

Ibn Tufayl served as the secretary of the Almohad governor of Granada, and later as the secretary of the Almohad governor of Ceuta and Tangiers (Abū Saʿīd ʿUthmān, one of 'Abd al-Mu'min's sons). Eventually, Ibn Tufayl moved to the service of Abū Yaʿqūb Yūsuf, who was a prince at the time and later became the second Almohad caliph.

== Hayy ibn Yaqzan ==
Ibn Tufayl was the author of Ḥayy bin Yaqẓān (Arabic: حي بن يقظان, lit. 'Alive, son of Awake'), also known as Philosophus Autodidactus in Latin, a philosophical romance and allegorical novel inspired by Avicennism and Sufism, and which tells the story of an autodidactic feral child, raised by a gazelle and living alone on a desert island, who, without contact with other human beings, discovers ultimate truth through a systematic process of reasoned inquiry. Hayy ultimately comes into contact with civilization and religion when he meets a castaway named Absal (Asāl in some translations). He determines that certain trappings of religion, namely imagery and dependence on material goods, are necessary for the multitude in order that they might have decent lives. However, imagery and material goods are distractions from the truth and ought to be abandoned by those whose reason recognizes that they are. The names of the characters in the novel, Ḥayy ibn Yaqẓān, Salamān, and Absāl were borrowed from Ibn Sina's tales. The title of the novel is also the same as Ibn Sina's novel. Ibn Tufayl did this on purpose to use the characters and the title as a small reference to Ibn Sina, as he wanted to touch upon his philosophy.

Ibn Tufayl's Philosophus Autodidactus was written as a response to al-Ghazali's The Incoherence of the Philosophers. In the 13th century, Ibn al-Nafis later wrote the Al-Risalah al-Kamiliyyah fil Siera al-Nabawiyyah (known as Theologus Autodidactus in the West) as a response to Ibn Tufayl's Philosophus Autodidactus.

Hayy ibn Yaqdhan had a significant influence on both Arabic literature and European literature, and it went on to become an influential best-seller throughout Western Europe in the 17th and 18th centuries. The work also had a "profound influence" on both classical Islamic philosophy and modern Western philosophy. It became "one of the most important books that heralded the Scientific Revolution" and European Enlightenment, and the thoughts expressed in the novel can be found "in different variations and to different degrees in the books of Thomas Hobbes, John Locke, Isaac Newton, and Immanuel Kant."

A Latin translation of the work, entitled Philosophus Autodidactus, first appeared in 1671, prepared by Edward Pococke the Younger. The first English translation (by Simon Ockley) was published in 1708. These translations later may have inspired Daniel Defoe to write Robinson Crusoe, which also featured a desert island narrative. The novel is also thought to have inspired the concept of "tabula rasa" developed by John Locke, in An Essay Concerning Human Understanding (1690). Locke's concept of "tabula rasa" refers to a state in which an infant is as formless as a blank slate. "Locke's Essay went on to become one of the principal sources of empiricism in modern Western philosophy, and influenced many enlightenment philosophers, such as David Hume and George Berkeley. Hayy's ideas on materialism in the novel also have some similarities to Karl Marx's historical materialism. It also foreshadowed Molyneux's Problem, proposed by William Molyneux to Locke, who included it in the second book of An Essay Concerning Human Understanding. Other European writers influenced by Philosophus Autodidactus included Gottfried Leibniz, Melchisédech Thévenot, John Wallis, Christiaan Huygens, George Keith, Robert Barclay, the Quakers, Samuel Hartlib, and Voltaire. In more recent readings, Nadia Maftouni has coined the term Sciart for intertwined artistic and scientific activities and has described Ibn Tufayl's Hayy ibn Yaqzan as a leading instant which touches on issues like human anatomy, autopsy, and vivisection within the confines of his novel.

== Works ==
- Raǧaz ṭawīl fī aṭ-Ṭibb (Arabic: رجز طويل في الطب, lit. 'Long Poem in Rajaz Metre on Medical Science'): Is a long poem describing how to diagnose illnesses, and find their cures. The poem is written in the Arabic Rajaz metre. It was only found recently in the capital of Morocco, which is Rabat.
- Arabic text of Hayy bin Yaqzan from Wikisource
- Full pdf of French translation of Hayy bin Yaqzan from Google Books
- English translations of Hayy bin Yaqzan (in chronological order)
  - The improvement of human reason, exhibited in the life of Hai ebn Yokdhan, written in Arabic above 500 years ago, by Abu Jaafar ebn Tophail, newly translated from the original Arabic, by Simon Ockley. With an appendix, in which the possibility of man's attaining of the true knowledge of God, and things necessary to salvation, without instruction, is briefly considered. London: Printed and sold by E. Powell, 1708.
  - Abu Bakr Ibn Tufail, The history of Hayy Ibn Yaqzan, translated from the Arabic by Simon Ockley, revised, with an introduction by A.S. Fulton. London: Chapman and Hall, 1929. available online (omits the introductory section)
  - Ibn Tufayl's Hayy ibn Yaqzān: a philosophical tale, translated with introduction and notes by Lenn Evan Goodman. New York: Twayne, 1972.
  - The journey of the soul: the story of Hai bin Yaqzan, as told by Abu Bakr Muhammad bin Tufail, a new translation by Riad Kocache. London: Octagon, 1982.
  - Two Andalusian philosophers, translated from the Arabic with an introduction and notes by Jim Colville. London: Kegan Paul, 1999.
  - Medieval Islamic Philosophical Writings, ed. Muhammad Ali Khalidi. Cambridge University Press, 2005. (omits the introductory section; omits the conclusion beginning with the protagonist's acquaintance with Absal; includes §§1-98 of 121 as numbered in the Ockley-Fulton version)
  - Ben-Zaken, Avner, "Taming the Mystic", in Reading Hayy Ibn-Yaqzan: A Cross-Cultural History of Autodidacticism (Johns Hopkins University Press, 2011). ISBN 978-0801897399.

== See also ==
- List of Arab scientists and scholars
- Early Islamic philosophy
- Arabic literature
- Autodidacticism
