= Muhammad ibn Makki (died 1532) =

Muḥammad Shams al-Dīn Ibn al-Makkī (died 17 January 1532), a native of Damascus, was the shaykh of the physicians of Syria. According to his contemporary, Ibn Ṭūlūn, he was the most learned physician but, owing to "poor luck", he had little success in treating patients. He was accused of killing the scholar al-Burhān ibn ʿAwn in 1510. He was accused of being a Shīʿī, but the 17th-century scholar Najm al-Dīn al-Ghazzī considered the accusation baseless. Besides medicine, he taught cosmography, geometry and astronomy.

Ibn Makkī was the teacher of Ghars al-Dīn Ibn al-Naqīb. He also taught the Italian Andrea Alpago, who calls him Rays Ebenmechi. He probably introduced the Italian to the works of Avicenna that he translated into Latin.

== Bibliography ==
- Michot, Yahya J. (2003). "A Mamlūk Theologian's Commentary on Avicenna's Risāla Aḍḥawiyya: Being a Translation of a Part of the Darʾ al-taʿāruḍ of Ibn Taymiyya, with Introduction, Annotation, and Appendices, Part I". Journal of Islamic Studies. 14 (2): 149–203. doi:10.1093/jis/14.2.149.
