= Commentary on Anatomy in Avicenna's Canon =

13th-century manuscript by Ibn al-Nafis

The Commentary on Anatomy in Avicenna's Canon is a work written in the 13th century by the Arab physician Ibn al-Nafis. A manuscript of the work was discovered in 1924 in the archives of the Prussian State Library in Berlin, Germany. It contains the earliest descriptions of the coronary circulation and pulmonary circulation systems. The manuscript records Ibn Nafis' prediction of the existence of the capillaries which he described as perceptible passages (manafidh) between pulmonary artery and pulmonary vein. These passages would later be identified by Marcello Malpighi as capillaries.

== Latin translation ==
The work was translated into Latin by the Italian physician Andrea Alpago, In 1520, Alpago returned to Padua with a Latin translation of the commentary, after living in the Arabian Peninsula for 30 years.

== Reception ==
Here, Ibn Nafis described for the first time and in detail how the blood comes to the left ventricle not through the septum, but from the right ventricle (RV) through the pulmonary artery, lungs, and the pulmonary vein. He also first described the presence and function of the coronary circulation.

— Circulation Research

When he (Ibn al-Nafis) was only 29, he published his most important work, the Commentary on Anatomy in Avicenna's Canon, which included his ground-breaking views on the pulmonary circulation and heart

— Journal of Applied Physiology

== See also ==
- The Canon of Medicine
