= Andrea Alpago =

Andrea Alpago (c. 1450 – late 1521 or January 1522) was an Italian physician and arabist. In publications of his work in Latin, his name is frequently given as Andreas Alpagus Bellunensis, where "Bellunensis" refers to his birthplace of Belluno in what was then the Republic of Venice.

== Life ==
Not much is known about his childhood nor his time in medical school. It is commonly assumed that his school was completed in Padua. Around the year 1487, Andrea Alpago moved to the city of Damascus in Syria in order to work as physician to the consulate of Republic of Venice. While working for the consulate, Alpago became a friend and mentee of Muḥammad ibn Makkī. This friendship strongly influenced Alpago's career as Ibn al-Makkī introduced him to the work of Avicenna, a Persian physician, astronomer, and philosopher. His translations of Avicenna's work from Arabic to Latin is possibly his most well-known achievement. This work allowed for greater transmission of Islamic knowledge to Europe. Alpago's nephew wrote that his uncle's translation of The Canon of Medicine was intended correct the mistakes in earlier translations.

This same translating ability also gave him new opportunities while working for the Venetian Consulate. Alpago was occasionally sent to do non-medical work and translations. He would send work back to the Venetian consulate detailing subjects such as the economy and culture in letters. During this time, Alpago became very close with the Arabic physicians, it is thought he sympathized with the Safavid dynasty due to their struggles with the Ottomans. After nearly twenty years working for the consulate in Damascus, Alpago almost left the consulate in 1507 to move back to Belluno, however, due his disagreement with the man who was supposed to replace him, he stayed until 1517. At this time, his nephew, Paulo Alpago, traveled with him to the consulate of Nicosia in Cyprus. Alpago stayed in Cyprus until December 1520 when he eventually traveled back to Venice.

During his travel to and from Venice, he ventured through various Arabic countries to find manuscripts, learn culture, and better understand languages. Upon his return to Venice, Alpago was appointed professor of medicine in Padua in northeastern Italy in September 1521, confirmed by the Venetian senate. After a few months of working at the university, Andrea Alpago died after a dinner, never having published his work. Alpago's nephew Paulo saw to it that his uncles extensive works were published after his death. This library included several books as well as pamphlets. His best known work is his commentary and editing of the Latin translation of The Canon of Medicine of Ibn Sina. This medicine book was translated from Arabic to Latin in the late 12th century by Gerard of Cremona. Andrea Alpago's edition and supplements to Gerard of Cremona's translation was widely read in European medical circles during the 16th century. It was first published in 1527 and an expanded edition was published in 1544. The Canon thoroughly explains as well as illustrates many vital parts of medicine including but not limited to anatomy and pharmacology. Although he only had about twelve corrections, they were done in an effort to make the translation make more sense when read in the other language. He did not change the meaning or purpose of any of the statements made by Gerard, regardless if he believed had the same view or not. The corrections he made were to simply clarify his translations. In addition to The Cannon of Medicine, Andrea Alpago's translation of Avicenna's philosophical work was historic for the time. Alpago explained major points of Avicenna's work on philosophy and Islam while occasionally relating it back to Christianity. Although Alpago did not like to change much when translating, he found it necessary to make some corrections with medical texts. Because many of the manuscripts were very old, Alpago found it necessary to correct some of the manuscripts because it was dealing with human life and should not endanger a person.

== Works ==
The following list is incomplete:

- Avicennae Liber Canonis Medicinae, Gerardus Cremonensis ex Arabico in Latinum translatus, cum Andreae Alpagi Bellunensis clarissimi castigationibus ex complurium codicum arabicorum (Ibn Sina's Canon of Medicine translated from Arabic to Latin by Gerard of Cremona, with clarifications and critiques by Andrea Alpago from many Arabic writings).
- Arabic-to-Latin translation of a Commentary on Anatomy in Avicenna's Canon
