= Hayy ibn Yaqdhan =

Arabic philosophical novel and allegorical tale written by Ibn Tufail

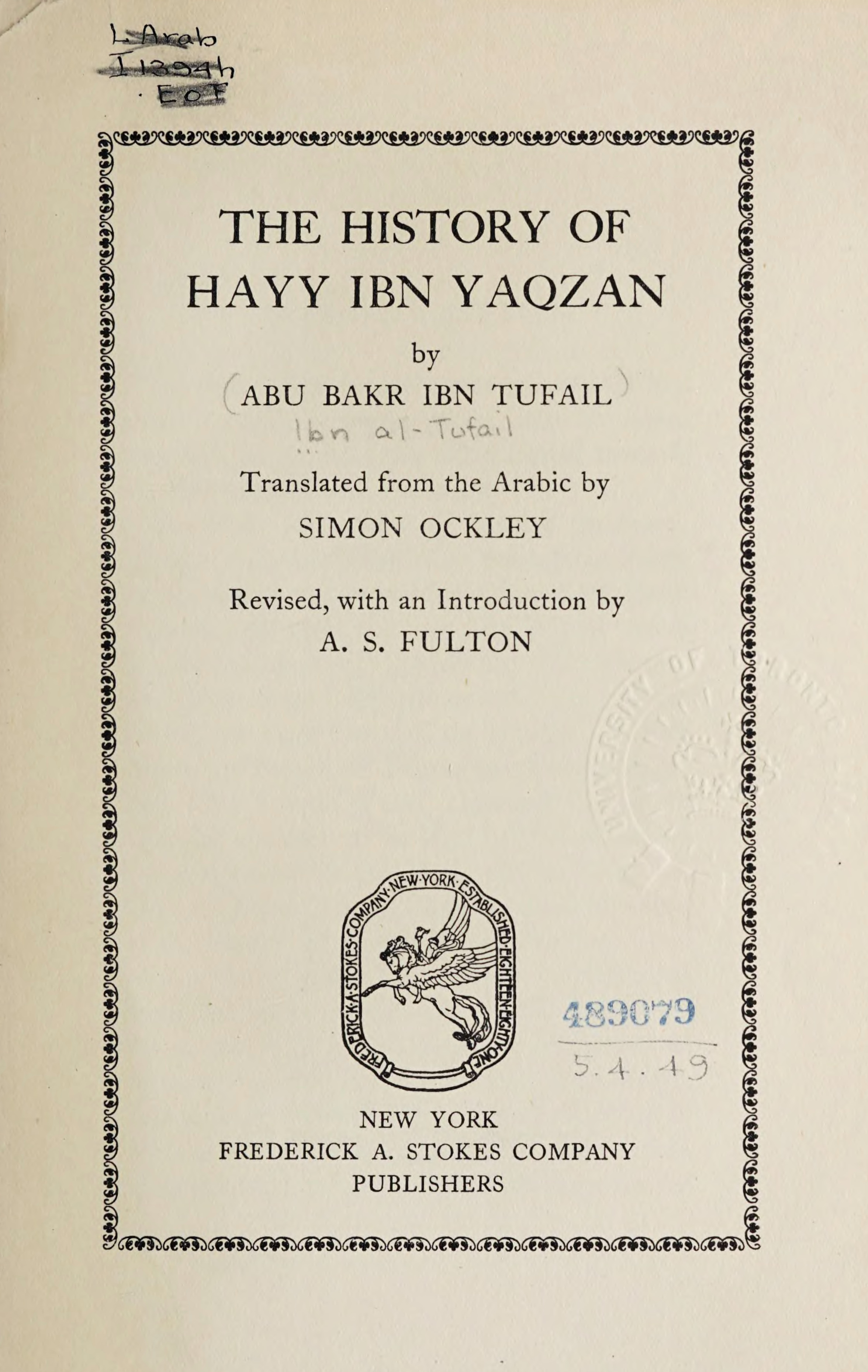
- Frontispiece of the Simon Ockley translation from 1708 (re-published in 1929)
- Author: Ibn Tufail
- Original title: حي بن يقظان
- Language: Arabic
- Genre: Philosophy
- Publication date: around 1160 CE (555 AH)

Ḥayy ibn Yaqẓān or Yaqdhan (Arabic: حي بن يقظان, lit. 'Hayy son of Yaqdhan' (Note: The name Hayy in Arabic means alive while Yaqdhan means awake); also transliterated as Hai eb'n Yockdan) is an Arabic philosophical novel and an allegorical tale written by Ibn Tufail (c. 1105 – 1185) in the early 12th century in al-Andalus. Names by which the book is also known include the Latin: Philosophus Autodidactus ('The Self-Taught Philosopher'); and English: The Improvement of Human Reason: Exhibited in the Life of Hai Ebn Yokdhan. Ḥayy ibn Yaqẓān was named after an earlier Arabic philosophical romance of the same name, written by Avicenna during his imprisonment in the early 11th century, even though both tales had different stories.

It is viewed as one of the most creative products of Islam's classical intellectual legacy. The novel greatly inspired Islamic philosophy as well as major Enlightenment thinkers. It is the third most translated text from Arabic, after the Quran and the One Thousand and One Nights.

== History ==
Hayy ibn Yaqdhan, along with three poems, is all that remains of the writings of Ibn Tufail (c. 1105 – 1185), who lived under the Almohads and served Sultan Abu Yaqub Yusuf. The book was influential among medieval Jewish scholars at the Toledo School of Translators run by Raymond de Sauvetât, and its impact can be seen in The Guide for the Perplexed of Maimonides. It was "discovered" in the West after Edward Pococke of Oxford, while visiting a market in Damascus, found a manuscript of Hayy ibn Yaqdhan made in Alexandria in 1303 containing commentary in Hebrew. His son, Edward Pococke Jr. published a Latin translation in 1671, subtitled "The Self-Taught Philosopher." George Keith the Quaker translated it into English in 1674, Baruch Spinoza called for a Dutch translation, Gottfried Wilhelm Leibniz championed the book in German circles, and a copy of the book went to the Sorbonne. Daniel Defoe (c. 1660 – 1731), author of Robinson Crusoe, was heavily influenced by the work as well as by the memoir of the Scottish castaway Alexander Selkirk.

In the Muslim world, the book is an honored Sufi text.

== Plot ==
The story revolves around Ḥayy ibn Yaqẓān, a little boy who grew up on an island in the Indies under the equator, isolated from the people, in the bosom of an antelope that raised him, feeding him with her milk. Ḥayy has just learned to walk and imitates the sounds of antelopes, birds, and other animals in his surroundings. He learns their languages, and he learns to follow the actions of animals by imitating their instinct.

He makes his own shoes and clothes from the skins of animals, and studies the stars. He reaches a higher level of knowledge, of the finest of astrologists. His continuous explorations and observation of creatures and the environment lead him to gain great knowledge in natural science, philosophy, and religion. He concludes that, at the basis of the creation of the universe, a great creator must exist. Ḥayy ibn Yaqẓān lived a humble modest life as Sufi and forbade himself from eating meat.

Once 30 years old, he meets his first human, who has landed on his isolated Island. By the age of 49, he is ready to teach other people about the knowledge he gained throughout his life.

== Concepts ==
Hayy ibn Yaqdhan is an allegorical novel in which Ibn Tufail expresses philosophical and mystical teachings in a symbolic language in order to provide better understanding of such concepts. This novel is thus the most important work of Ibn Tufail, containing the main ideas that form his system.

Ibn Tufail was familiar with the differences in the ideas of Al-Ghazali and those of the "Neoplatonizing Aristotelianists" Al-Farabi and Ibn Sina. In Hayy ibn Yaqdhan, Ibn Tufail sought to present "a conciliating synthesis of the Islamic speculative tradition with al-Ghazālī's Sufi-influenced recasting of Islamic mysticism and pietism." Ibn Tufail borrows from Ibn Sina, using the title of one of his allegories and drawing inspiration from his Floating Man thought experiment, but transforming the subject's sensory deprivation to social isolation.

With this novel, Tufail focuses on finding solutions to the three main problems discussed during his period:

1. Humans, on their own, are able to reach the level of al-Insān al-Kāmil by merely observing nature and thinking, without any education.
2. The information that is obtained through observation, experiment, and reasoning does not contradict revelation. Religion and philosophy (or science) are compatible rather than contradictory.
3. Reaching the absolute information is individual and simply any human being is able to achieve that.

== Legacy ==
Beyond leaving an enormous impact on Andalusi literature, Arabic literature, and classical Islamic philosophy, Hayy ibn Yaqdhan influenced later European literature during the Age of Enlightenment, turning into a best-seller during the 17th-18th centuries. The novel particularly influenced the philosophies and scientific thought of vanguards of modern Western philosophy and the Scientific Revolution such as Thomas Hobbes, John Locke, Christiaan Huygens, Isaac Newton, and Immanuel Kant. Beyond foreshadowing Molyneux's Problem, the novel specifically inspired John Locke's concept of tabula rasa as propounded in An Essay Concerning Human Understanding (1690), subsequently inspiring the philosophies of later modern empiricists, such as David Hume and George Berkeley. The novel's notion of materialism also has similarities to Karl Marx's historical materialism. The English translation by orientalist Simon Ockley inspired the desert island narrative of Daniel Defoe's classic Robinson Crusoe.

== Translations ==
=== English translations ===
- George Keith. 1674 from Latin
- George Ashwell 1686 from Latin
- Simon Ockley. 1708. The Improvement of Human Reason: Exhibited in the Life of Hai Ebn Yokdhan. London: E. Powell. First direct translation from the original Arabic, with an appendix in which the possibility of man's attaining the true knowledge of God, and things necessary to salvation, without instruction, is briefly considered.
  - Slightly altered by Edward A. van Dyck, 1905
  - The History of Hayy Ibn Yaqzan (1929 – revised ed.) with an introduction by A. S. Fulton. London: Chapman & Hall.
- Lenn Evan Goodman. 1972. Ibn Tufayl's Hayy ibn Yaqzān: A Philosophical Tale, translated with introduction and notes by L. E. Goodman. New York: Twayne.
- Riyaad Kocache 1982. The journey of the soul: the story of Hai bin Yaqzan. London: Octagon.
- Jim Colville. 1999. Two Andalusian Philosophers, with an introduction and notes by J. Colville. London: Kegan Paul.
- Muhammad Ali Khalidi, ed. 2005. Medieval Islamic Philosophical Writings. Cambridge University Press. Abridged. Omits the introductory section; omits the conclusion beginning with the protagonist's acquaintance with Asal; and includes §§1-98 of 121 as numbered in the Ockley version.

=== Other translations ===
- Latin: Edward Pococke (1671)
- Dutch: Reelant, Adriaan. 1701. De natuurlijke wijsgeer. Netherlands: Willem Lamsveld.
- German: Schaerer, Patric O. 2004. Der Philosoph als Autodidakt. Hamburg: Meiner. ISBN 978-3-7873-1797-4
- German: Abdeljelil, Jameleddine Ben, and Viktoria Frysak, eds. 2007. Hayy Ibn Yaqdhan. Ein muslimischer Inselroman. Vienna: Edition Viktoria. ISBN 978-3-902591-01-2.
- Modern Greek: Kalligas, Pavlos. 2018. Ο δρόμος του λόγου: Χάυυ Ιμπν Γιακζάν ή Τα μυστικά της φιλοσοφίας της Ανατολής. Athens: Ekkremes Publishing House. 264. ISBN 978-618-5076-22-1.
- Portuguese: Loureiro, Isabel. 2005. O filósofo autodidata. São Paulo: UNESP. ISBN 85-7139-599-3.
- Turkish: Suçin, Mehmet Hakkı. 2021. Hayy bin Yakzan. İstanbul: Kapı Yayınları. ISBN 9786257706629.

== See also ==
- Arabic literature
- Andalusi literature
- Arabic epic literature
- The forbidden experiment (linguistics)
