= Isaac ben Joseph ibn Pulgar =

14th-century Spanish philosopher and poet

Isaac ben Joseph ibn Pulgar or Isaac ben Joseph ibn Polkar or Isaac Polqar was a Spanish Jewish philosopher, poet, and controversialist, who flourished in the first half of the fourteenth century.

== Life ==
Where he lived is not known, for though "Avilla" is given at the end of his translation of Al-Ghazali's Maqasid, the town-name as well as the date is probably the copyist's. He was a warm defender of Isaac Albalag, and continued his translation of Al-Ghazali's-work. It seems from his Ezer ha-Dat that he had been a friend of Abner of Burgos; but when the latter, after conversion, sent him one of his anti-Jewish writings, he replied in a stinging satirical poem.

== Works ==
Ibn Pulgar wrote the following:

1. Hebrew translation of the third book of Al-Ghazali's Maqasid (completed in 1307)
2. Ezer ha-Dat, the most important of his writings (see below), a polemical work in five books, in the form of dialogues, and interspersed with verse;
3. Iggeret ha-Ḥarfit, a refutation of Abner of Burgos' Minhat Kena'ot
4. a refutation in Spanish of astrology
5. verse.

Ibn Pulgar defended halakhah, but said that aggadic portions of the Talmud that do not pertain to matters of faith are not authoritative. Ibn Pulgar's theory was that laws were not instituted for the sake of God, who has no need of them, but for the sake of man. Therefore, he who observes these laws must not expect any future reward, as he is rewarded in the observance of them. Thus the question, "Why are sinners often happy and the pious unhappy?" has no meaning, for virtue and wisdom contain happiness in themselves, while sin and folly contain unhappiness.

Of Ezer ha-Dat, the first book, in eight chapters ("she'arim", literally "gates"), is a demonstration of the superiority of the Jewish religion, in which Ibn Pulgar attacks both apostates and Christians. The second book attacks infidels and skeptics. The third attacks astrologers. The fourth attacks those who explain the Bible in a strictly literal sense and those who, like the Christians, interpret it in a figurative and allegorical sense. The fifth attacks those who do not believe in the immortality of the soul.

The second book, a dialogue between an aged partisan of Talmudic Judaism ("Torani") and a youthful philosopher, has been printed in Eliezer Ashkenazi's "Ta'am Zekenim" (Frankfort-on-the-Main, 1855). Ibn Pulgar's object here was to prove the superiority of philosophical Judaism; but his arguments are more clearly expressed in the fourth book, in which he attacks kabbalists, sorcerers, and false philosophers. His diatribes against the first two classes have been published by Isidore Loeb. The complete work was published by George S. Belasco.
