= Isaac Albalag =

Philosopher

Isaac Albalag (Hebrew: יצחק אלבלג) was a Jewish philosopher and translator of the second half of the 13th century.

== Biography ==
According to Moritz Steinschneider (Hebräische Uebersetzungen. pp. 299–306), Albalag probably lived in northern Spain or southern France. Heinrich Graetz makes him a native of southern Spain. His liberal views, especially his interpretations of the Biblical account of the Creation in accordance with the Aristotelian theory of the eternity of the world, stamped him in the eyes of many as a heretic.

== Translation work ==
Apart from this, he showed little originality and was eclectic in tendency. This is illustrated by the fact that though he was an unreserved follower of Aristotle, he showed a leaning toward the Kabbalah, the excesses of which, however, he energetically opposed, especially the redaction of Biblical interpretations based on the assumed numerical values of the letters (Gematria). His most characteristic work was a translation (1292) of a part of Al-Ghazali's Maqasid al-Falasifa (Aims of the Philosophers), which embraces only two parts of the original; namely, logic and metaphysics.

Albalag did not confine himself therein to the work of a translator but often corrected the views of other philosophers as formulated by Al-Ghazali, who intended to refute them himself in his later work entitled Tahafut al-Falasifa (Incoherence of the Philosophers). Albalag remarked that Al-Ghazali did not refute the philosophers but rather his errors, into which he had fallen by obtaining information not from Aristotle himself, but from his commentators, such as Ibn Sina (Avicenna) and others. According to Albalag, this charge also applies to Maimonides when attempting to refute Aristotle, as, for instance, on the eternity of the world.

In the composition of his work, Albalag made it his main object to counteract the widespread popular prejudice that philosophy was undermining the foundation of religion. Religion and philosophy would, for Albalag, agree on the fundamental principles of all positive religion — which are: "the belief in reward and punishment, in immortality, in the existence of a just God, and Divine Providence" (which does not take into account any of previous materialistic philosophies, such as those of Diogenes or Democritus..).

"Religions, as well as philosophy... both follow the same aim; namely, to render mankind happy. ... It is, no doubt, quite true that philosophy, which addresses itself to the individual, differs, in its mode of establishing those truths, from religion, which appeals to the great masses. Philosophy demonstrates; religion only teaches." - S. Horovitz

== Doctrinal assertions ==
Albalag, however, by no means asserts that the doctrines of the philosophers must entirely coincide with those of religion; and it is exactly in his conception of their mutual relation that his peculiar standpoint manifests itself. The idea, already expressed by Maimonides, that the naked philosophical truth is often harmful for the masses, and that therefore the Holy Scriptures had often to adapt themselves to the intellectual level of the people, was so strongly emphasized by him that it is probable he was influenced by Ibn Rushd (Averroes), who made this idea the central point of his book Theology and Philosophy — "therefore, he errs doubly who rejects a philosophical truth on account of its apparent contradiction of Scripture: first, because he misses the true meaning of Scripture; second, because thereby he declares the real arguments of philosophy to be inconclusive."

In cases where an adjustment is absolutely impossible, Albalag brings forward a very strange solution; namely, that the teaching of the philosopher is true from the speculative standpoint, and at the same time the utterance of Scripture is true from a higher, supernatural point of view — the philosophical mode of knowledge being altogether different from the prophetic. And as the philosopher is only intelligible to his compeers, so the prophet can be understood only by prophets. This view resembles the theory of double truth (the theological and the philosophical), originated and chiefly developed in the 13th century at the University of Paris (Friedrich Albert Lange, Gesch. des Materialismus, 3d ed., i. 181).

== Influences ==
There is no evidence, however, of any direct influence of the Parisian thinkers on Albalag, as he could have come to his view by a more natural process; viz., by combining the two opposite influences of Ibn Roshd and Al-Gazzali, whose idea of the difference between philosophical and prophetical knowledge is at the bottom of the latter's work, the Munkid. Accepting these two influences, the view of the double truth necessarily follows. It may be added that Albalag interpreted the Biblical account of the Creation as signifying that the six days represent the relative order of things, while he conceives the seventh day as pointing to the world of ideals.
