= Muqatil =

Muqatil (Arabic: مقاتل, romanized: Muqātil) is a masculine given name of Arabic origin meaning 'fighter'. Notable people with the name include:

== Given name ==
- Muqatil ibn Atiyah, 11th-century scholar
- Muqatil ibn Sulayman (died 767), 8th-century scholar
