= Sayf al-Din al-Amidi =

Muslim jurist (1156–1233)

Sayf al-Din al-Amidi at-Taghlibi

Personal life
- Born: 1156 Diyarbakır
- Died: 1233 (aged 76–77) Damascus
- Region: Ayyubid dynasty
- Main interest(s): Islamic theology, Hadith, Islamic jurisprudence

Religious life
- Religion: Islam
- Denomination: Sunni
- Jurisprudence: Shafi'i
- Creed: Ash'ari

Muslim leader
- Influenced by: Al-Shafi‘i, Ibn al-Hajib, Al-Ghazali, Asad Mayhani

Sayf al-Din al-Amidi or Muhammad al-Amidi (b. 1156; Diyarbakır – d. 1233 in Damascus) was an influential Muslim jurist. Initially a Hanbalite, Al-Amidi belonged to the Shafi`i school and worked to combine kalam (theology) with existing methods of jurisprudence.

== Personal life and education ==
ʿAlī ibn Muḥammad ibn Sālim, Sayf al-Dīn al-Āmidī (1156 – 1233) was born in Āmid (modern-day Diyarbakır). According to al-Qifṭī, he initially studied Shafi'i law in his native region. Traditional biographical dictionaries and historical consensus establish that he was of Arab descent, hailing from the Taghlib tribe.

He later traveled to Baghdad to join the learning circle of the prominent Shafi'i teacher Ibn Fadlan. Influenced by Ibn Fadlan's teachings and drawn to Ash'ari theology, al-Amidi transitioned to the Shafi'i school. During his time in Baghdad, he also studied philosophy under a Christian tutor.

Around 1196 (592 AH), al-Amidi relocated to Cairo, Egypt, where he achieved significant scholarly success and fame. However, his rapid rise and philosophical approach provoked jealousy among rival jurists, who organized a petition calling for his execution. Although the plot failed, the hostile environment prompted him to leave for the Levant (Sham) in secret.

In Syria, he was highly welcomed and patronized by the Ayyubid emir of Hama, Al-Mansur, before eventually settling in Damascus. There, he was appointed to teach at the prestigious Al-Aziziyya Madrasa, where he authored his major works on Islamic jurisprudence, including Al-Iḥkām fī Uṣūl al-Aḥkām. Despite his high academic standing, shifting political climates and renewed friction with rivals led to his dismissal from his teaching post. He spent the final months of his life under house arrest in Damascus until his death in 1233 (631 AH).

== Engagement with Philosophy and Logic ==
Al-Amidi extensively integrated logic (mantiq) and philosophical frameworks into the study of Islamic jurisprudence (Usul al-fiqh) and theology (Kalam). This intellectual synthesis made him a prominent figure in the rational sciences. In his philosophical writings, he engaged directly with the works of his contemporaries; for instance, he critically defended certain philosophical doctrines against the theological criticisms leveled by the prominent Ash'ari theologian Fakhr al-Din al-Razi. Furthermore, his epistemological interests extended to the classification of knowledge, as demonstrated in his Treatise on the Division of Theoretical Scholarship, which outlines the distinctions between foundational and theoretical belief systems.

As a professor, al-Amidi taught these rational sciences to a number of students who later became distinguished scholars in their own right. Among his most notable students in Damascus were the leading Shafi'i jurist 'Izz al-Din ibn 'Abd al-Salam and the physician and historian Ibn Abi Usaibia.

Despite his controversial political standing and the accusations of heresy leveled against him by conservative jurists due to his reliance on philosophy, classical biographers and historians recorded widespread praise for his intellect. The historian Ibn Khallikan, who met him in his youth, described him as unmatched in his era in the rational sciences. His student, 'Izz al-Din ibn 'Abd al-Salam, testified to his unparalleled eloquence and mastery in scholastic debates, noting that he had never seen anyone deliver lectures with such precision. Furthermore, Ibn 'Abd al-Salam asserted that if a heretic were to challenge Islam with philosophical doubts, no one would be more qualified to debate and refute them than al-Amidi, due to his comprehensive mastery of rational argumentation.

Even historians known for their strict traditionalism, such as Al-Dhahabi and Ibn Taymiyya, acknowledged his deep penetration into philosophical texts and his exceptional mental acuity, with al-Dhahabi referring to him as a "master of the foundational and rational sciences."

== Writings ==
al-Amidi believed that an expression was amm (universal) if it was “a single vocable that signifies two or more referents simultaneously”. An objection to this teaching was that it implied at least two affected by the injunction, which created doubt about how the injunction would apply to a single person.

al-Amidi defined ijtihad as the “total expenditure of effort in search for an opinion as to any legal rule in such a manner that the individual senses (within himself)an inability to expend further effort”. His work, A Treatise on Book Titles, he writes on existence, and how time and place are associated with existence. al-Amidi also wrote about linguistics. On Substantiation Through Transitive Relations discusses figurative speech in the first two sections. The second section talks about analogies and transitive relations. The last section covers existence. A copy of this, and at least three of al-Amidi's works were re-published in 1805 by an unknown publisher. They are held in the collection of the Bašagić Collection of Islamic Manuscripts at the University Library in Bratislava.

His most famous work is Al-ihkam fi usul al-ahkam on usul al-fiqh.

== See also ==
- Ibn 'Abd as-Salam

== Sources ==
1. Weiss, Bernard. The search for God's law: Islamic jurisprudence in the writings of Sayf al-Dīn al-Āmidī. Univ of Utah Pr, 1992. Print.
2. Madelung, W. "Review: [untitled]." Islamic Law and Society 4.1 (1997): 122-125. Web. 16 Feb 2011.
3. Madelung, W. "Review: [untitled]." Islamic Law and Society 4.1 (1997): 122-125. Web. 16 Feb 2011.
4. Sherman, Jackson. "Taqlid, Legal Scaffolding and the Scope of Legal Injunctions in the Post-Formative Theory Mutlaq and Amm in the Jurisprudence of Shihab Al-Din Al-Qarafi." Islamic Law and Society (1996): 165-192. Web. 16 Feb 2011.
5. Weiss, Bernard. "Interpretation in Islamic Law: The Theory of Ijtihad." American Journal of Comparative Law 26.2 (1978): 199-212. Web. 16 Feb 2011.
6. Esposito, John, Dictionary of Islam (Oxford University Press, 2004) ISBN 978-0-19-512559-7
