= The Incoherence of the Incoherence =

Book by Averroes

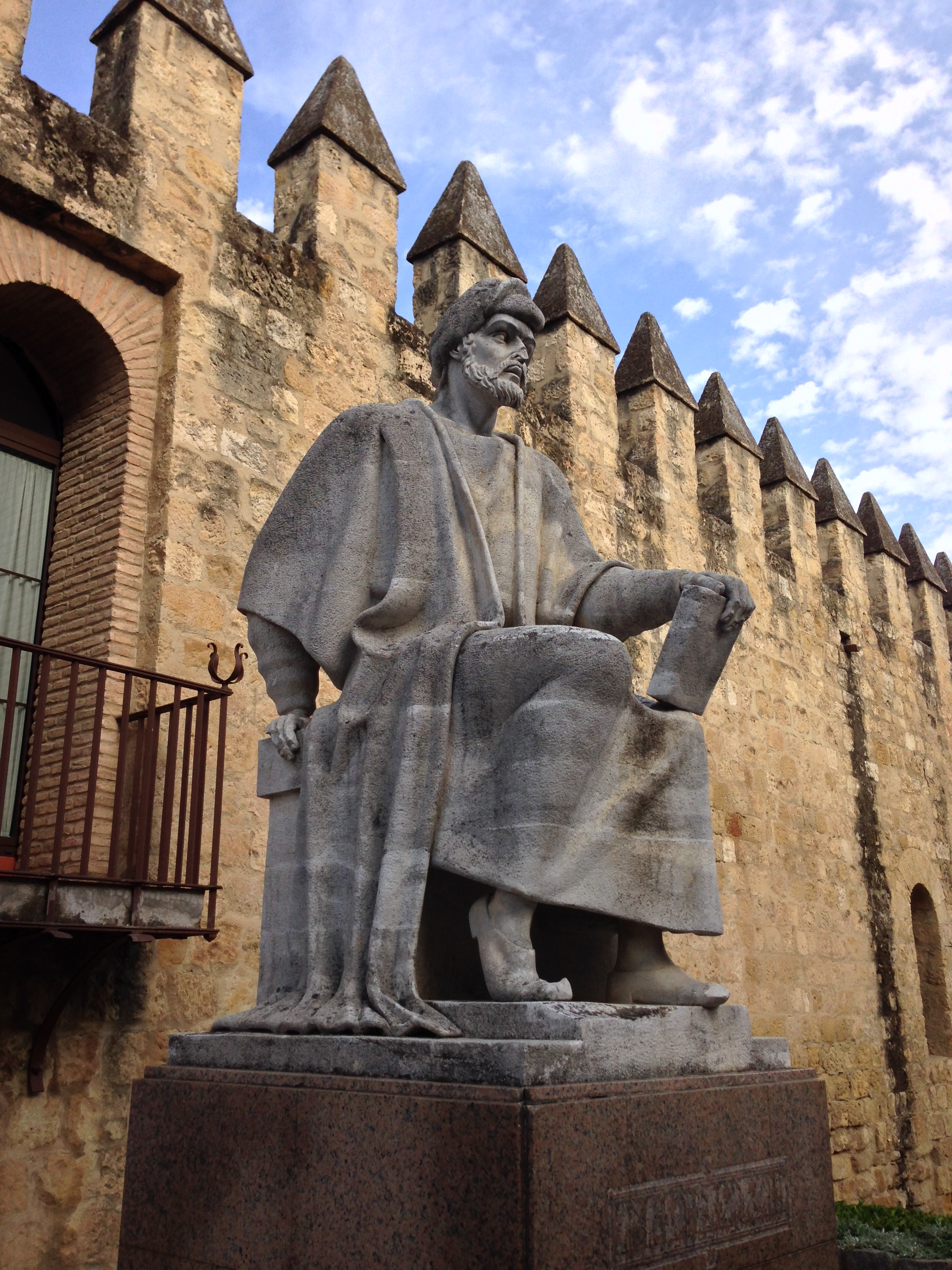
The Incoherence of the Incoherence was written by Ibn Rushd (statue in Córdoba, Spain).

The Incoherence of the Incoherence (Arabic: تهافت التهافت Tahāfut al-Tahāfut) by Andalusian Muslim polymath and philosopher Ibn Rushd (Arabic: ابن رشد, romanized: Ibn Rushd, 1126–1198) is an important Islamic philosophical treatise in which the author defends the use of Aristotelian philosophy within Islamic thought.

It was written in the style of a dialogue against al-Ghazali's claims in The Incoherence of the Philosophers (Tahāfut al-Falasifa), which criticized Neoplatonic thought.

Originally written in Arabic, The Incoherence of the Incoherence was subsequently translated into many other languages. The book is considered Ibn Rushd's landmark; in it, he tries to create harmony between faith and philosophy.

== Background ==
In The Incoherence of the Philosophers, the Sufi-sympathetic imam al-Ghazali ("Algazel") of the Ash'ari school of Islamic theology argued against Avicennism, denouncing philosophers such as Ibn Sina and al-Farabi. The text was dramatically successful, and marked a milestone in the ascendance of the Ash'ari within philosophy and theological discourse. It was preceded by a summary of Neoplatonism titled Maqasid al-Falasifah ("Aims of the Philosophers").

Al-Ghazali stated that one must be well versed in the ideas of the philosophers before setting out to refute their ideas. Al-Ghazali also stated that he did not have any problem with other branches of philosophy such as physics, logic, astronomy or mathematics. His objection was with metaphysics, in which he claimed that the philosophers did not use the same tools, namely logic, which they used for other sciences.

== Contents ==
Ibn Rushd's response defends the doctrines of the "philosophers" and criticizes al-Ghazali's own arguments. It is written as a sort of dialogue: Ibn Rushd quotes passages by al-Ghazali and then responds to them.

== Summary ==
Ibn Rushd attempted to create harmony between faith and philosophy, between Aristotelian ideas and Islam. He claimed that Aristotle is also right and the words of Quran are also the eternal truth.

== Critical reception ==
In Europe, Ibn Rushd's philosophical writings were generally well received by Christian and Jewish scholars and gave rise to the philosophical school of Averroism.
