= Ibn Jahbal al-Kilabi =

Personal life
- Died: 1333
- Main interest: Aqeedah

Religious life
- Religion: Islam
- Denomination: Sunni
- Jurisprudence: Shafi'i
- Creed: Ash'ari

Muslim leader
- Influenced by: Al-Ghazali

Ibn Jahbal al-Kilabi (d. 733 H/ 1333 CE) was a Muslim scholar from Damascus, Syria.

== Refutation of Ibn Taymiyyah ==
Al-Kilabi is known to have written a refutation of Ibn Taymiyyah, inspired by Al-Ghazali, which is copied into Taj al-Din al-Subki's Tabaqat al-Shafi'iyyah al-Kubra. It is idenfitied as lying firmly within the Ash'ari "tafwid-ta'wil" hermeneutic which negates God having corporeal/spatial attributes.

He explains his reason for writing it as follows:

What called for writing down this tract is what occurred recently. Someone jotted down something affirming location [for God], and whoever does not have a firm foothold in learning is deceived by it... So, I thought it best to mention the creed of the People of the Sunna and the Community and then elucidate the corruption of what he mentioned... Then, I provided proofs for the creed of the people of the Sunna and what is linked to that.

— Ibn Jahbal

In the treatise, Al-Kilabi never mentions Ibn Taymiyyah by name, instead referring to him as "he" or "you". He labels him a turncoat, someone deluded and an imposter. He also counts him as among the Hashwiyyah and shows particular disdain for the fact that some Hashwiyyah, like Ibn Taymiyyah, identify their views with the doctrine of the salaf and teach them to the masses.

Al-Kilabi takes Al-Ghazali's last work, Iljam al-Awwam as his starting point and abridges the first chapter of Iljam into a few pages. Following Al-Ghazali, Al-Kilabi outlines seven points that the common people (awwam) must observe.

They must:

1. Free God from all corporeal conceptions.
2. Believe and affirm what the Prophet said about God is true, even if it cannot be understood.
3. Admit ones inability to comprehend.
4. Keep silent.
5. Refrain from interpreting the texts.
6. Stop thinking about the texts.
7. Believe firmly that the Prophet knew the meaning of the texts.

In the final section of his treatise, Al-Kilabi outlines four rational proofs for God's freedom from location. These proofs assert that ascribing location to God subjects God to the absurdities of finitude, temporal origination and measure, as well as the eternal existence of an independently existing location. Al-Kilabi then quotes a number of Quranic verses, such as "There is nothing like him" (Qur'an 42:11).

== Sources ==
- Hoover, Jon (2020). "Early Mamluke Ash'arism against Ibn Taymiyya on the nonliteral reinterpretation (ta'wil) of God's attributues". Philosophical Theology in Islam. Brill: 195–230.
- Gasimov, Kamal (2023). "Muslim saints contested: Ibn Taymiyya's critique of al-Qushayrī's Risāla". Journal of Islamic Studies. 34 (2): 153–211.
