= Imad al-Din al-Isfahani =

Persian historian and writer (1125–1201)

- محمد ابن حامد
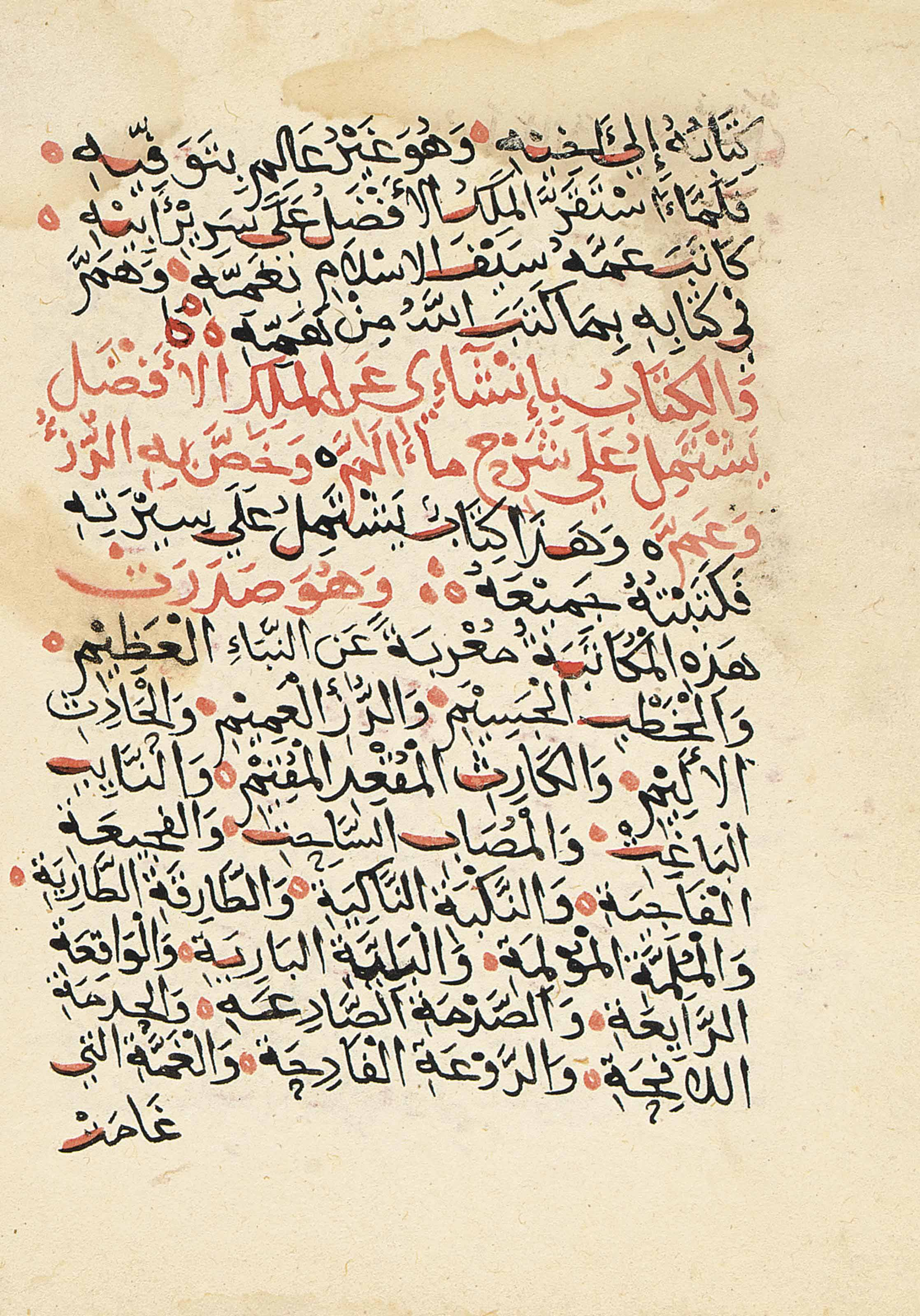
- Manuscript of Imad ad-Din al-Isfahani's Tarikh al-Barq al-Bana. Copy made in Mamluk Syria, dated 15th century
- Born: Muhammad ibn Hamid; 1125; Isfahan, Seljuk Empire
- Died: 5 June 1201; Damascus, Ayyubid Dynasty
- Military career
- Allegiance: Zengid dynasty Ayyubid dynasty
- Unit: Kings Guard
- Conflicts: Battle of Marj Uyun; Battle of Hattin; Siege of Jerusalem (1187); Third Crusade

Muhammad ibn Hamid (Persian: محمد ابن حامد, romanized: Muḥammad ibn Ḥāmid; 1125 – 20 June 1201), commonly known as Imad al-Din al-Isfahani (Persian: عماد الدین اصفهانی), was a historian, scholar, and rhetorician. He left a valuable anthology of Arabic poetry to accompany his many historical works and worked as a man of letters during the Zengid and Ayyubid period.

== Biography ==
Muhammad was born in Isfahan, to a Persian family, in the year 1125, and studied at the Nizamiyya of Baghdad. He graduated into the bureaucracy, and held jurisdiction over Basra and Wasit. He then became a deputy of the vizier ibn Hubayra. After the death of ibn Hubayra, he went to Damascus in 1166 CE (562 Islamic Calendar) and entered the service of the qadi of Damascus, Kamal ad-Din. The qadi presented him to the Zengid Nur ad-Din, who appointed him a professor in the school he had established there, which then became known as the Imadiyya school in his honour. Nur ad-Din was later appointed to be his Chancellor.

After the death of Nur ad-Din in 1174, Imad al-Din was removed from all his bureaucratic duties, and was banished from the palace. He went to live in Mosul and later entered the service of Saladin, the Sultan of Egypt during that time. When Saladin took control of Damascus, Saladin's vizier, al-Qadi al-Fadil, appointed him chancellor, and he also became al-Fadil's deputy. Although Saladin had been unsure of his talent because he was only a scribe, Imad al-Din soon became one of the sultan's favourites. As chancellor he did not have to perform the everyday duties of the chancery scribes, and he had a lot of leisure time in Egypt.

From then on he accompanied Saladin on all his campaigns. After a certain raid, he was chosen to kill one of the prisoners, but the prisoner was a child and was instead exchanged for a Muslim prisoner held by the Crusaders. Imad al-Din was present at the Battle of Marj Ayyun, the Battle of Hattin, and the subsequent campaign to expel the Crusaders from the Holy Land. At Acre, he criticised Saladin for giving away the city's treasure instead of spending it on the reconquest. At Beirut, he became ill, but was the only scribe capable of writing the terms of surrender. He had recuperated in time to see the aftermath of the siege of Jerusalem, where he again criticised Saladin's generosity; he was also disgusted by those in charge of the ransom who took bribes, and the rich Crusader nobles who took their treasures with them rather than ransoming the poor. He was present at Acre again during the Third Crusade when the Christians retook the city of Acre, and was among those who fled after the defeat.

After Saladin's death in 1193, he began writing his biographies of the sultan. He wrote the Kitab al-Barq al-Shami, which is largely lost, save for its third and fifth volumes, but was abridged by al-Bundari and used heavily by the Muslim historians Ibn al-Athir and Abu Shama in their own chronicles. He also wrote al-Fath al-Qussi fi-l-Fath al-Qudsi, which survives. One manuscript of the Bustan al-jami' attributes it to Imad al-Din, but this seems to be an error, for its information on Saladin does not align too well with that of Imad al-Din's biography. He died on 5 June 1201 in Damascus.

== In popular culture ==
- A heavily fictionalised version of Imad ad-Din is portrayed in the 2005 Ridley Scott epic film Kingdom of Heaven, by actor Alexander Siddig.
- Imad ad-Din is also portrayed in The Book of Saladin by Tariq Ali, the second instalment of what is known as the "Islam Quintet".

== See also ==
- Baha ad-Din ibn Shaddad
- List of pre-modern Iranian scientists and scholars
