= The Beginning of Guidance =

12th-century literary work by Al-Ghazali

Bidayat al Hidayah
- Author: Al-Ghazālī
- Subject: Islamic Law and Islamic Jurisprudence
- Publication date: 12th century
- Publication place: Persia

Bidayat al Hidayah (transl. The Beginning of Guidance; Arabic: بداية الهداية ) was written by Abū Ḥāmid Muḥammad ibn Muḥammad al-Ghazālī during his last days. It is a guidebook describing the principles of getting guidance through taqwa. The manual is concise and arranged in the form of a daily programme. The book contains three sections, which are on the obedience, refraining from disobedience, and the etiquette of companionship with the God and His creation. It serves as a preface to his major texts.

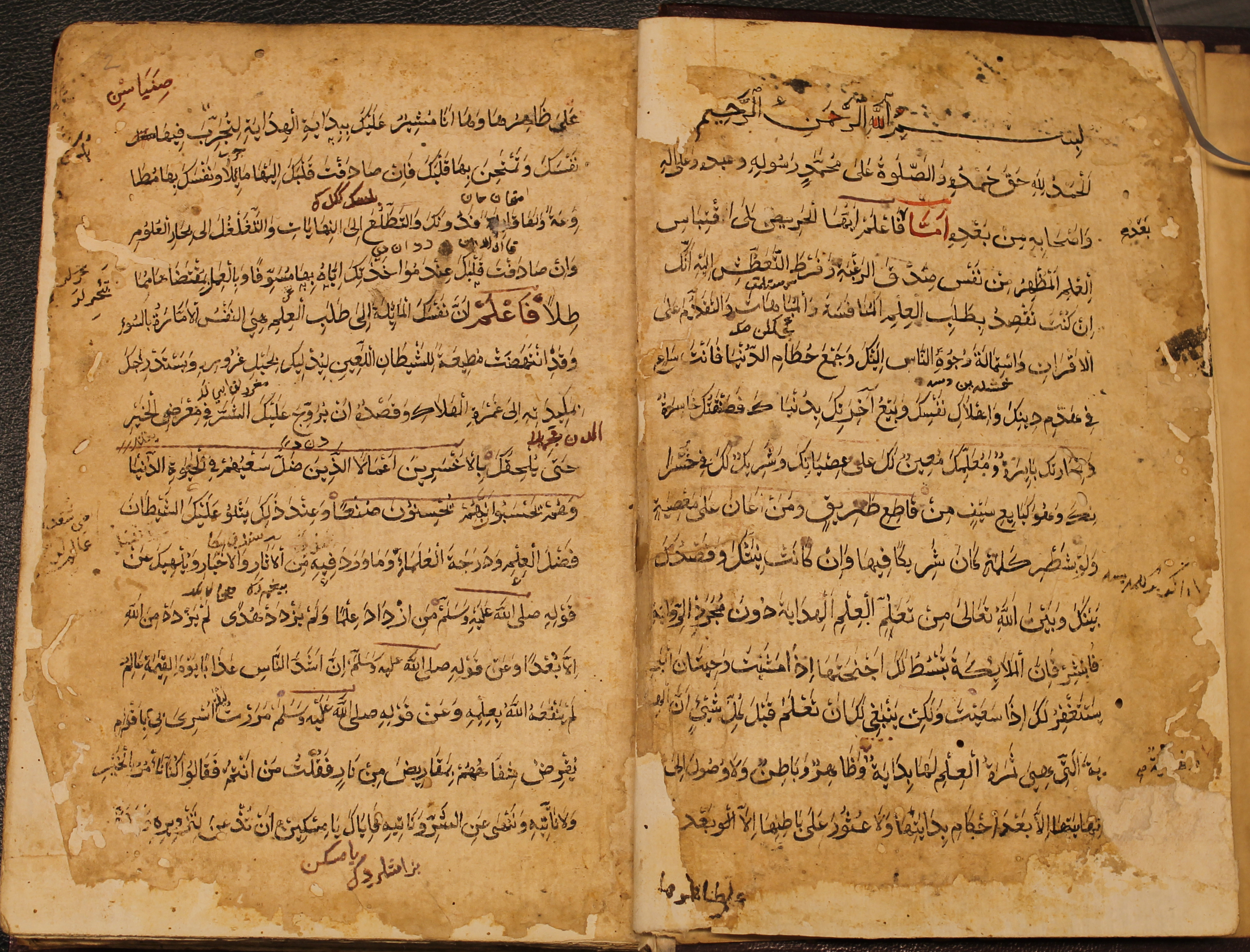
Bidāyat al-hidāya, dated AH 800 (AD 1397), British Library.
