= The Incoherence of the Philosophers =

1095 CE book by al-Ghazali

The Incoherence of the Philosophers (Arabic: تهافت الفلاسفة, romanized: Tahāfut al-Falāsifa) is a landmark 11th-century work by the Muslim polymath al-Ghazali, a student of the Asharite school of Islamic theology, criticizing the Avicennian school of early Islamic philosophy. Muslim philosophers such as Ibn Sina (Avicenna) and al-Farabi (Alpharabius) are denounced in this book, as they follow Greek philosophy even when, in the author's perception, it contradicts Islam. The text was dramatically successful, and marked a milestone in the ascendance of the Asharite school within Islamic philosophy and theological discourse.

The book favors faith over philosophy in matters specifically concerning metaphysics or knowledge of the divine.

== Background ==
In July 1091, at the invitation of Nizam al-Mulk, al-Ghazali became professor of law at the Nizamiyya of Baghdad, one of the most prestigious colleges at that time. This college was intended in part to train scholars to counter the religious propaganda of the Fatimid caliphs, and al-Ghazali's appointment at the Nizamiyya was consistent with that intention.

This book was a series of four theological works that he wrote during his tenure as professor of law at the Nizamiyya. The first one was a summary of philosophical thought titled Maqāsid al-Falāsifa (Aims of the philosophers), an exposition that follows Avicenna's philosophical doctrine. In Maqāsid, al-Ghazali clearly stated that this book was intended as an introduction to Tahāfut, and he also stated that one must be well versed in the ideas of the philosophers before setting out to refute their ideas. Tahāfut al-Falāsifa was the second work of this series. The third work, Miyar al-Ilm fi Fan al-Mantiq (Criterion of Knowledge in the Art of Logic), was an exposition of Avicenna's Logic that al-Ghazali stated as an appendix to the Tahāfut. And the last work was Al-Iqtisād fī al-iʿtiqad (The Moderation in Belief), an exposition of Asharite theology to fill the metaphysical doctrine that he rejected and negated in the Tahāfut.

This series clearly shows that al-Ghazali did not reject all philosophical science as many scholars believe. Al-Ghazali stated that he did not find other branches of philosophy including physics, logic, astronomy or mathematics problematic. His only dispute was with metaphysics in which he claimed that the philosophers did not use the same tools, namely logic, which they used for other sciences.

== Contents ==
The work is organized into 20 chapters in which al-Ghazali attempts to refute Avicenna's doctrines.

He states that Avicenna and his followers have erred in seventeen points (each one of which he addresses in detail in a chapter, for a total of 17 chapters) by committing heresy. But in three other chapters, he accuses them of being utterly irreligious. Among the charges that he leveled against the philosophers is their inability to prove the existence of God and inability to prove the impossibility of the existence of two gods.

The twenty points are as follows:

1. Refuting the doctrine of the world's pre-eternity.
2. Refuting the doctrine of the world's post-eternity.
3. Showing their equivocation of the following two statements: God is the creator of the world vs. the world is God's creation.
4. The inability of philosophers to prove the existence of the Creator.
5. The inability of philosophers to prove the impossibility of the existence of two gods.
6. The philosopher's doctrine of denying the existence of God's attributes.
7. Refutation of their statement: "the essence of the First is not divisible into genus and species".
8. Refutation of their statement: "the First is simple existent without quiddity".
9. Their inability to demonstrate that the First is not a body.
10. Discussing their materialist doctrine necessitates a denial of the maker.
11. Their inability to show that the First knows others.
12. Their inability to show that the First knows Himself.
13. Refuting that the First does not know the Particulars.
14. Refuting their doctrine that states: "the heavens are an animal that moves on its own volition".
15. Refuting what they say regarding the reason that the heavens move.
16. Refuting their doctrine that the heavens are souls that know the particulars.
17. Refuting their doctrine that disruption of causality is impossible.
18. Refuting their statement that the human soul is a self-sustaining substance that is neither a body nor an accident.
19. Refuting their assertion of the impossibility of the annihilation of the human soul.
20. Refuting their denial of bodily resurrection and the accompanying pleasures of Paradise or the pains of Hellfire.

=== Beyond heresy ===
Among the twenty points, al-Ghazali presents three that he charges constitute not only heresy, but also disbelief in Islam.

1. The theory of a pre-eternal world. Ghazali wrote that God created the world in time and just like everything in this world time will cease to exist as well, but God will continue to exist.
2. God knows only the universal characteristics of particulars - namely Platonic forms.
3. Bodily resurrection will not take place in the hereafter, and only human souls are resurrected.

=== Occasionalism ===
The Incoherence of the Philosophers propounds the Asharite theory of occasionalism. Al-Ghazali wrote that when fire and cotton are placed in contact, the cotton is burned directly by God rather than by the fire, a claim which he defended using logic in Islamic philosophy.

He explained that because God is usually seen as rational, rather than arbitrary, his behavior in normally causing events in the same sequence (i.e., what appears to us to be efficient causation) can be understood as a natural outworking of that principle of reason, which we then describe as the laws of nature. Properly speaking, however, these are not laws of nature but laws by which God chooses to govern his own behaviour (his autonomy, in the strict sense) – in other words, his rational will.

=== Cosmology and astronomy ===
Al-Ghazali expresses his support for a scientific methodology based on demonstration and mathematics, while discussing astronomy. After describing the solar eclipse and the lunar eclipse, he writes:

Whosoever thinks that to engage in a disputation for refuting such a theory is a religious duty harms religion and weakens it. For these matters rest on demonstrations, geometrical and arithmetical, that leave no room for doubt.

In his defense of the Asharite doctrine of a created universe that is temporally finite, against the Aristotelian doctrine of an eternal universe, al-Ghazali proposed the modal theory of possible worlds, arguing that their actual world is the best of all possible worlds from among all the alternate timelines and world histories that God could have possibly created. His theory parallels that of Catholic theologian Duns Scotus in the 14th century. While it is uncertain whether al-Ghazali had any influence on Scotus, they both may have derived their theory from their readings of Avicenna's Metaphysics.

== Critical reception ==
Ibn Rushd (Averroes) wrote a refutation of al-Ghazali's work entitled The Incoherence of the Incoherence (Tahāfut al-Tahāfut) in which he defends the doctrines of the philosophers and criticizes al-Ghazali's own arguments. It is written as a sort of dialogue: Averroes quotes passages by al-Ghazali and then responds to them.

In the 15th century, an Ottoman Turkish scholar Mustafa Ibn Yusuf al-Bursawi, also known as Khwajahzada (d. 1487) wrote a book about The Incoherence of the Philosophers upon the request of Sultan Mehmed the Conqueror. In this book, Bursawi criticises al-Ghazali so harshly that Sheikh ul-Islam Ibn Kemal expressed a doubt on if Bursawi's purpose was to demonstrate the incoherence of al-Ghazali or the philosophers.

Another less critical response to al-Ghazali's arguments was written by Ibn Rushd's predecessor Ibn Tufail (Abubacer) as part of his Arabic philosophical novel, Hayy ibn Yaqzan (later translated into Latin and English as Philosophus Autodidactus). Ibn Tufail cites al-Ghazali as an influence on his novel, especially his views on Sufism, but was critical of his views against Avicennism. Ibn al-Nafis later wrote another novel, Theologus Autodidactus, as a response to Ibn Tufail's Philosophus Autodidactus, defending some of al-Ghazali's views.
