= Baha ad-Din ibn Shaddad =

Historian and scholar (1145–1234)

- بهاء الدين ابن شداد
- Born: 6 March 1145; Mosul, Zengid dynasty
- Died: 8 November 1234 (aged 89); Aleppo, Abbasid Caliphate
- Occupations: Historian, Jurist, Scholar

Academic work
- Era: Medieval Islamic Period
- Main interests: Biography of Saladin, Islamic Law
- Notable works: Al-Nawādir al-Sultaniyya wa'l-Maḥāsin al-Yūsufiyya (The Rare and Excellent History of Saladin); The Refuge of Judges from the Ambiguity of Judgements; The Proofs of Judgments; The Epitome; The Virtues of the Jihad

Bahāʾ al-Dīn Abū al-Maḥāsin Yūsuf ibn Rāfiʿ ibn Tamīm (Arabic: بهاء الدين ابن شداد; the honorific title Bahā' ad-Dīn means "splendor of the faith"; sometimes transliterated as Bohadin or Boha-Eddyn; 6 March 1145 – 8 November 1234) was a 12th-century Arabic jurist, scholar and historian best known for writing a biography of Saladin whom he knew well.

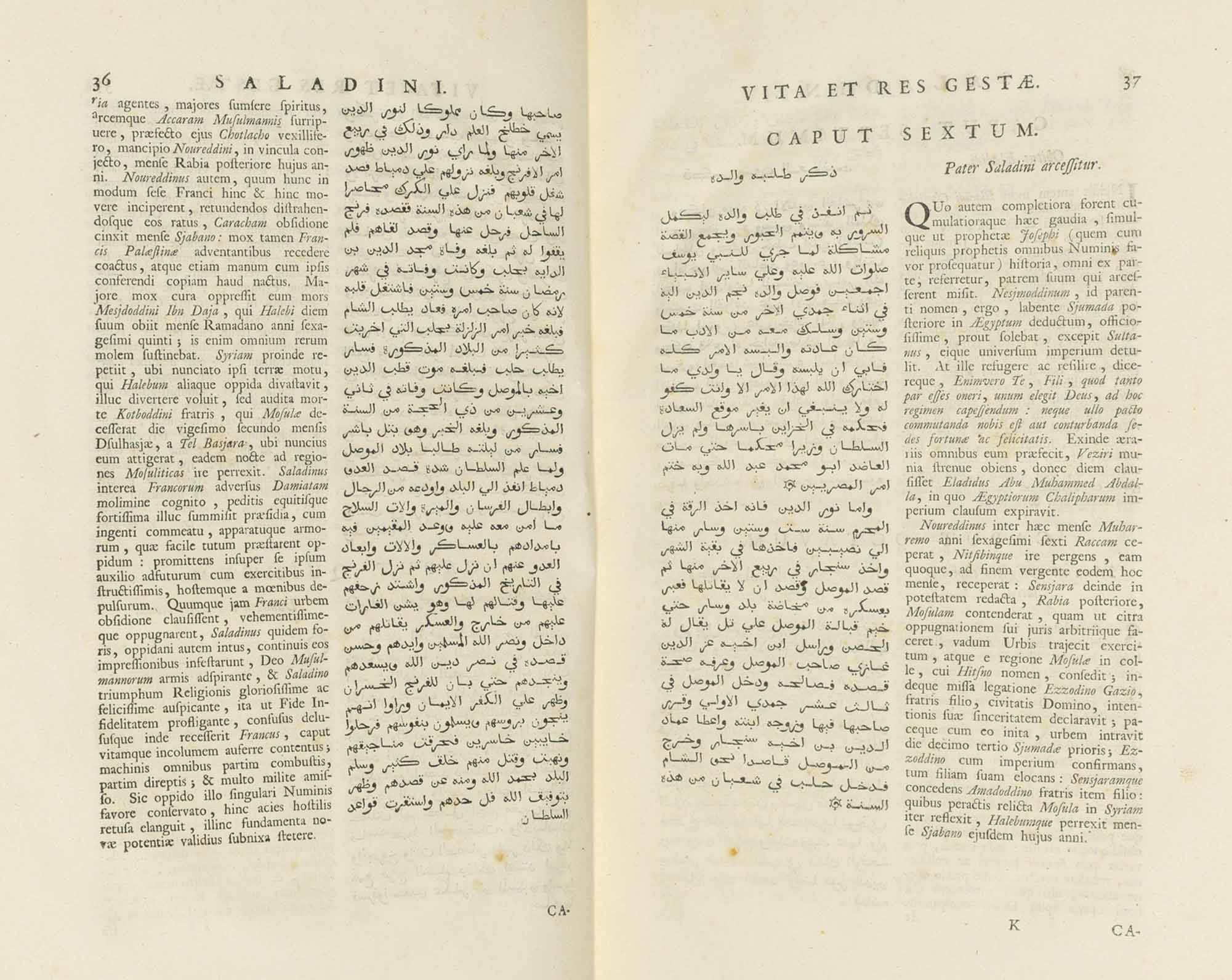
First volume of the Vita et res gestae Sultani, almalichi alnasiri, Saladini by "Bohadinus" (i.e. Baha ad-Din ibn Shaddad). Parallel Arabic and Latin text printed in two columns. Edited and translated by Albert Schultens, published in Leiden by Samuel Luchtmans, dated 1732.

== Life ==
Ibn Shaddad was born in an Arab family from Mosul on 10 Ramadan 539 AH (6 March 1145 CE), where he studied the Qur'an, hadith, and Muslim law before moving to the Nizamiyya of Baghdad where he rapidly became mu'id ("assistant professor"). At an early age, Ibn Shaddad lost his father and he was raised by his maternal uncles the Banu Shaddad, from whom he got his name 'Ibn Shaddad'. About 1173, he returned to Mosul as mudarris ("professor"). In 1188, returning from Hajj, ibn Shaddād was summoned by Saladin who had read and been impressed by his writings. He was "permanently enrolled" in the service of Saladin, who appointed him qadi al-'askar ("judge of the army"). In this capacity, he was an eyewitness at the Siege of Acre and the Battle of Arsuf and provided "a vivid chronicle of the Third Crusade".

Extracts of his accounts of the Crusaders' march from Acre to Arsuf and the subsequent battle (in which Ibn Shaddad was an actual participant) appear in the book "A Knight in battle", written and illustrated by Ewart Oakeshott.

Saladin and ibn Shaddād soon became close friends and the sultan appointed him to several high administrative and judicial offices. Ibn Shaddād remained an intimate and trusted friend of Saladin, "seldom absent for any length of time", as well as one of his main advisers, for the rest of the sultan's life. After Saladin's death, ibn Shaddād was appointed qadi ("judge") of Aleppo. He died there on 14 Safar 632 AH (8 November 1234), aged 89 years.

== Works ==
Ibn Shaddād's best-known work is his biography of Saladin, which is "based for the most part on personal observation" and provides a complete portrait as "Muslims saw him". Published in English as The Rare and Excellent History of Saladin, the Arab title (al-Nawādir al-Sultaniyya wa'l-Maḥāsin al-Yūsufiyya) translates as "Sultanic Anecdotes and Josephly Virtues". The text has survived intact and is still in print. Ibn Shaddād also wrote several works on the practical application of Islamic law, The Refuge of Judges from the Ambiguity of Judgements, The Proofs of Judgments and The Epitome as well as a monograph entitled The Virtues of the Jihad. Much of the information known about Ibn Shaddād derives from Ibn Khallikan's contemporary Biographical Dictionary (Wafāyāt al-a'yān, literally "Obituaries of Eminent Men").

== See also ==
- Qadi al-Fadil
- Imad al-Din al-Isfahani
