= Nizamiyya of Baghdad =

Medieval university

- Arabic: المدرسة النظامية في بغداد
- Type: Nizamiyya (madrasa)
- Active: 1065–around 1258 (destroyed during the Sack of Baghdad)
- Founders: Nizam al-Mulk
- Head: Ahmad Ghazali (approx. 12th century)
- Academic staff: Abu Ishaq al-Shirazi; al-Ghazali; Ibn al-Sabbagh; al-Kiya al-Harrasi; others
- Students: approximately 3,000 (circa 1096)
- Location: Baghdad, Abbasid Caliphate (modern-day Iraq)
- Campus: Urban, lecture halls and arcaded courtyards, library
- Curriculum: Islamic law (Shafi‘i), theology (Ash‘ari), literature, arithmetic; later expanded to include history, mathematics, physical sciences, music
- Notable alumni/affiliates: Ibn Tumart; Muhammad al-Shahrastani; Baha ad-Din ibn Shaddad; Imad ad-Din al-Isfahani; Saadi Shirazi

The Nizamiyya of Baghdad (Note: Less commonly al-Nizamiyya of Baghdad.) or the Baghdad Nizamiyya, also known as the Nizamian college of Baghdad (Arabic: المدرسة النظامية في بغداد, romanized: al-Madrasa n-Niẓāmiyya fī Baġdād, lit. 'the Nizamian school in Baghdad'), was one of the first Nizamiyyas, established in 1065 in Baghdad. The Nizamiyya of Baghdad was considered among the most important and prestigious educational institutions of the Abbasid era, alongside the Mustansiriyya Madrasa. It has been described as the "largest university of the Medieval world." The Nizamiyya school was completely Shafi'i. One of its requirements was that all teachers, preachers, and librarians be Shafi'i in jurisprudence and Ash'ari in theology. This school was home to prominent Shafi'i jurists including Abu Ishaq al-Shirazi, Ibn al-Sabbagh, Abu Sa'ad al-Mutawalli, Abu Hamid al-Ghazali, and al-Kiya al-Harrasi.

In July 1091, Nizam al-Mulk appointed the 33-year-old al-Ghazali as a professor of the school. Offering free education, Ibn Tumart, founder of the Berber Almohad dynasty, reputedly attended the school and studied under al-Kiya al-Harrasi. Nizam al-Mulk's son-in-law Muqatil ibn Atiyah was also employed by the school. In 1096, when al-Ghazali left the Nizamiyya, it housed 3,000 students. In 1116, Muhammad al-Shahrastani taught at the Nizamiyya. In the 1170s, statesman Baha ad-Din ibn Shaddad taught at the Nizamiyya, before he moved on to teach in Mosul, while Imad ad-Din al-Isfahani studied there in the late 12th century. Others affiliated with the Nizamiyya of Baghdad include Asad Mayhani, Ayn al-Quzat Hamadani and al-Janzi.

The Persian poet Saadi Shirazi studied at the Nizamiyya during the early 13th century, when he set out on a journey. He was also among those who witnessed first-hand accounts of its destruction by Mongol Ilkhanate invaders led by Hulagu during the Sack of Baghdad in 1258. He recalls his days of studies at the Nizamiyya of Baghdad: "A fellow-student at Nizamiah displayed malevolence towards me, and I informed my tutor, saying 'Whenever I give more proper answers than he, the envious fellow becomes offended.' The professor replied, 'The envy of thy friend is not agreeable to thee, but I know not who told thee that back-biting was commendable. If he seek perdition through the path of envy, thou wilt join him by the path of slander.'"

The curriculum initially focused on religious studies, Islamic law, Arabic literature, and arithmetic, and later extended to history, mathematics, the physical sciences, and music.

== See also ==
- Abu Ishaq al-Shirazi
- Mustansiriyya Madrasa, another Baghdad school, founded in 1233
- Madrasa
- Islamic Golden Age

== Bibliography ==
- Makdisi, George: "Madrasa and University in the Middle Ages", Studia Islamica, No. 32 (1970), pp. 255–264
