= Muqatil ibn Atiyah =

Medieval Islamic scholar

Muqatil ibn Atiyah ibn Muqatil al-Bakri al-Hijazi (Arabic: مقاتل بن عطية بن مقاتل البكري الحجازي, romanized: Muqātil b. ʿAṭiyya b. Muqātil al-Bakrī l-Ḥijāzī; fl. 11th century) was allegedly a medieval authority of the Nizamiyya of Baghdad, and son-in-law of Nizam al-Mulk. He was

the son of an Arab chief. Being obliged to quit his brothers in consequence of a quarrel, he proceeded to Baghdad and then set out for Khorâsân, whence he went to Ghazna. Having returned to Khorâsân, he devoted his services to the vizir Nizâm al-Mulk and married into his family.

He is known only by a treatise in Arabic that he wrote, Mu'tamar Ulama' Baghdad (Arabic: مؤتمر علماء بغداد), in which he recounts in detail a Sunni-Shi'i debate taking place in the court of Sultan Malik Shah I. It has been translated into Persian under the title In search of Truth in Baghdad (Persian: در جستجوی حق در بغداد), as well as under the title راهی به سوی حقیقت (ISBN 964-93287-8-5).
