= Al-Ghazali =

Sunni Muslim polymath (c. 1058–1111)

Imam Al-Ghazali
- ٱلْغَزَّالِيّ
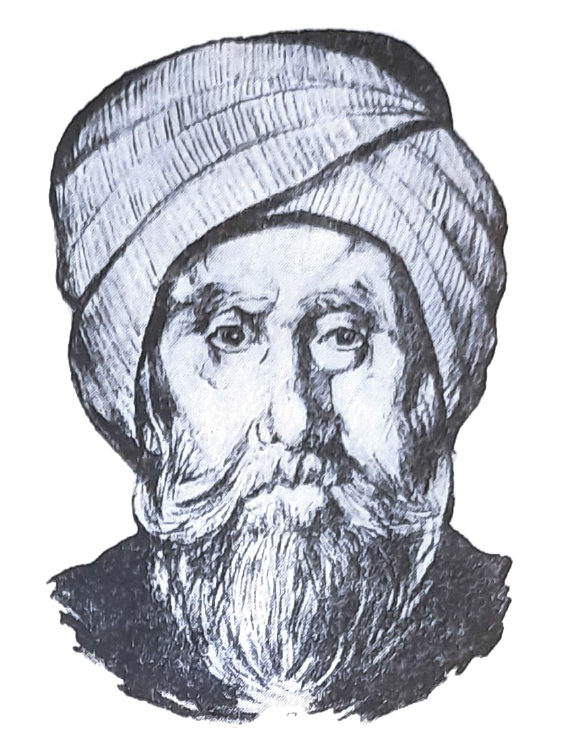
- A sketch representing Al-Ghazali from a book entitled Sayr mulhimah: min al-Sharq wa-al-Gharb by unknown author, 1961
- Title: Hujjat al-Islam ('Proof of Islam')

Personal life
- Born: c. 1058 Tus, Seljuk Empire
- Died: 19 December 1111 (aged 52–53) Tus, Seljuk Empire
- Era: Islamic Golden Age
- Region: Seljuk Empire (Tus); Abbasid Caliphate (Baghdad); Fatimid Caliphate (Jerusalem) / (Damascus)
- Main interest(s): Sufism, theology (kalam), philosophy, logic, Sharia, Islamic jurisprudence, Principles of Islamic jurisprudence
- Notable work(s): The Revival of Religious Sciences, The Aims of the Philosophers, The Incoherence of the Philosophers, The Alchemy of Happiness, The Moderation in Belief, The Condensed in Imam Shafi’i’s Jurisprudence, On Legal theory of Muslim Jurisprudence

Religious life
- Religion: Islam
- Denomination: Sunni
- School: Shafi’i
- Creed: Ash'ari

Muslim leader
- Influenced by: Harith al-Muhasibi; al-Juwayni; Avicenna; Al-Raghib al-Isfahani
- Influenced: Ibn Jahbal al-Kilabi; Ibn Rushd; Abu Bakr ibn al-Arabi; Ayn al-Quzat Hamadani; Abu al-Qasim al-Rafi'i; al-Nawawi; Ibn Tumart; René Descartes; Fakhr al-Din al-Razi; al-Suyuti; Maimonides; Tan Malaka; Thomas Aquinas; Shah Waliullah Dehlawi; David Hume; Sayf al-Din al-Amidi; Asad Mayhani; Ali al-Qari; Muhammad Ibn Yahya al-Janzi

Al-Ghazali (Persian: ابو حامد محمد ابن محمد غزالی طوسی, romanized: Abū Ḥāmid Muḥammad ibn Muḥammad Ghazālī Ṭūsi; (Note: In Arabic: أُبُو حَامِدِ مُحَمَّدُ بْنُ مُحَمَّدِ بْنِ مُحَمَّدِ بْنِ أَحْمَدَ الغَزَالِيُّ الطُوسِيُّ الشَّافِعِيُّ, romanized: Abū Ḥāmid Muḥammad ibn Muḥammad ibn Muḥammad ibn Aḥmad al-Ghazālī al-Ṭūsī al-Shāfiʿī. Pronunciation: UK: /ælˈɡɑːzɑːli/, US: /ˌælɡəˈzɑːli, -zæl-/.) c. 1058 – 19 December 1111), latinized as Algazelus, (Note: Also frequently Anglicized as Algazel.) was an Shafi'i Ash'ari Sunni Muslim scholar and polymath. He is known as one of the most prominent and influential jurisconsults, legal theoreticians, muftis, philosophers, theologians, logicians and mystics in Islamic history.

He is considered by Sunni Muslims to be the 11th century's mujaddid, a renewer of the faith, who, according to the prophetic hadith, appears once every 100 years to restore the faith of the Islamic community. Al-Ghazali's works were so highly acclaimed by his contemporaries that he was awarded the honorific title "Proof of Islam" (Ḥujjat al-Islām). Al-Ghazali was a prominent mujtahid in the Shafi'i school of law.

Much of al-Ghazali's work stemmed around his spiritual crises following his appointment as the head of the Nizamiyya of Baghdad, which was the most prestigious academic position in the Muslim world at the time. This led to his eventual disappearance from the Muslim world for over 10 years, realising he chose the path of status and ego over God. It was during this period where many of his great works were written. He believed that the Islamic spiritual tradition had become moribund and that the spiritual sciences taught by the first generation of Muslims had been forgotten. This belief led him to write his magnum opus entitled The Revival of the Religious Sciences. Among his other works, The Incoherence of the Philosophers is a landmark in the history of philosophy, as it advances the critique of Aristotelian science developed later in 14th-century Europe.

== Biography ==
Al-Ghazali was born in c. 1058 in Tus. He was of Persian Muslim descent, and was born in Tabaran, a town in the district of Tus, Khorasan. Al-Ghazali's contemporary and first biographer, Abd al-Ghafir al-Farsi, records merely that al-Ghazali began to receive instruction in fiqh (Islamic jurisprudence) from Ahmad al-Radhakani, a local teacher and Abu ali Farmadi, a Naqshbandi sufi from Tus. He later studied under al-Juwayni, the distinguished jurist and theologian and "the most outstanding Muslim scholar of his time," in Nishapur, perhaps after a period of study in Gurgan. After al-Juwayni's death in 1085, al-Ghazali departed from Nishapur and joined the court of Nizam al-Mulk, the powerful vizier of the Seljuk Empire, which was likely centered in Isfahan. After bestowing upon him the titles of "Brilliance of the Religion" and "Eminence among the Religious Leaders", Nizam al-Mulk advanced al-Ghazali in July 1091 to the "most prestigious and most challenging" professorial position at the time: the Nizamiyya of Baghdad.

He underwent a spiritual crisis in 1095, abandoned his career and left Baghdad on the pretext of going on pilgrimage to Mecca. Making arrangements for his family, he disposed of his wealth and adopted an ascetic lifestyle. According to biographer Duncan B. Macdonald, the purpose of abstaining from scholastic work was to confront the spiritual experience and more ordinary understanding of "the Word and the Traditions." After some time in Damascus and Jerusalem, with a visit to Medina and Mecca in 1096, he returned to Tus to spend the next several years in uzla (seclusion). The seclusion consisted in abstaining from teaching at state-sponsored institutions, but he continued to publish, receive visitors and teach in the zawiya (private madrasa) and khanqah (Sufi lodge) that he had built.

Fakhr al-Mulk, grand vizier to Ahmad Sanjar, pressed al-Ghazali to return to the Nizamiyya of Nishapur. Al-Ghazali reluctantly capitulated in 1106, fearing rightly that he and his teachings would meet with resistance and controversy. He later returned to Tus and declined an invitation in 1110 from the grand vizier of the Seljuq Sultan Muhammad I to return to Baghdad. He died on 19 December 1111. According to 'Abd al-Ghafir al-Farsi, he had several daughters but no sons. He was buried near his home in Tus, Iran.

== School affiliations ==
Al-Ghazali contributed significantly to the development of a systematic view of Sufism and its integration and acceptance in mainstream Islam. As a scholar of Islam, he belonged to the Shafi'i school of Islamic jurisprudence and to the Asharite school of theology. Al-Ghazali received many titles such as Zayn al-Dīn (زين الدين) and Ḥujjat al-Islām (حجة الإسلام).

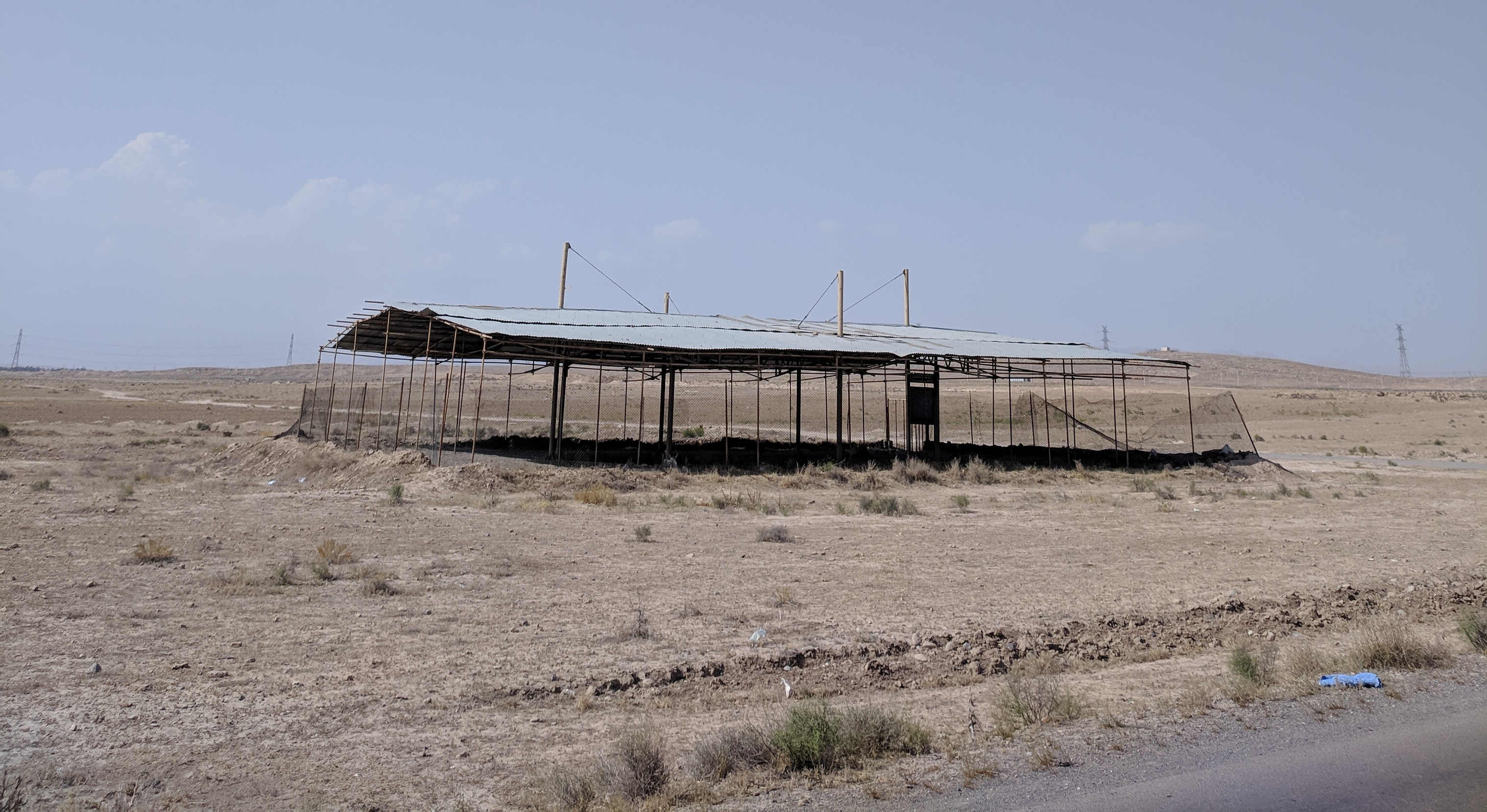
Mausoleum of al-Ghazali in Tus

He is viewed as the key member of the influential Asharite school of early Muslim philosophy and the most important refuter of the Mutazilites. However, he chose a slightly different position in comparison with the Asharites. His beliefs and thoughts differ in some aspects from the orthodox Asharite school.

== Decade of seclusion ==
In 1095, at the peak of his academic career as the leading scholar of the most prestigious institution in the Islamic world; Al-Ghazālī decided to step down to undertake a journey that would take the next 10 years of his life. It was said that Al-Ghazālī was suffering from both emotional and physical difficulties including loss of appetite, indigestion and struggling to even vocally orate his lectures as he would normally. When the leading medical practitioners could not remedy his ailments and all medicines had failed, they determined the cause to be a psychological and internal spiritual one, and therefore its remedy can only be a spiritual one.

He was critical of the social and spiritual situation of both his academic institution, the scholarly peers and the political class. Initially he mentioned that he was going on a journey to the Hajj pilgrimage, in order to avoid attempts at preventing his decision from the leadership. Al-Ghazālī sold his belongings, distributed all his property, which was said to be so sufficient for his dependents that he donated the rest to charity.

His first stop was Damascus, at the Umayyad Mosque. In Damascus, he found work as a mosque sweeper, and lived in the minaret of the mosque. During this time period, he produced his most celebrated works of Islamic authorship, some that are today a hallmark of that era. He wrote his chief work, The Revival of the Religious Sciences, in this period. In addition to the works mentioned above related to Bāṭinism, al-Maqṣad al-asnā fī sharḥ asmāʾ Allāh al-ḥusnā, Bidāyat al-hidāya, al-Wajīz, Jawāhir al-Qurʾān, al-Arbaʿīn fī uṣūl al-dīn, al-Maḍnūn bihi ʿalā ghayr ahlih, al-Maẓnūn al-ṣaghīr, Fayṣal al-tafriqa, al-Qānūn al-kullī fī al-taʾwīl (Qānūn al-taʾwīl, p. 95, 111), The Alchemy of Happiness, and Ayyuhā al-walad are also among the works he wrote in this period.

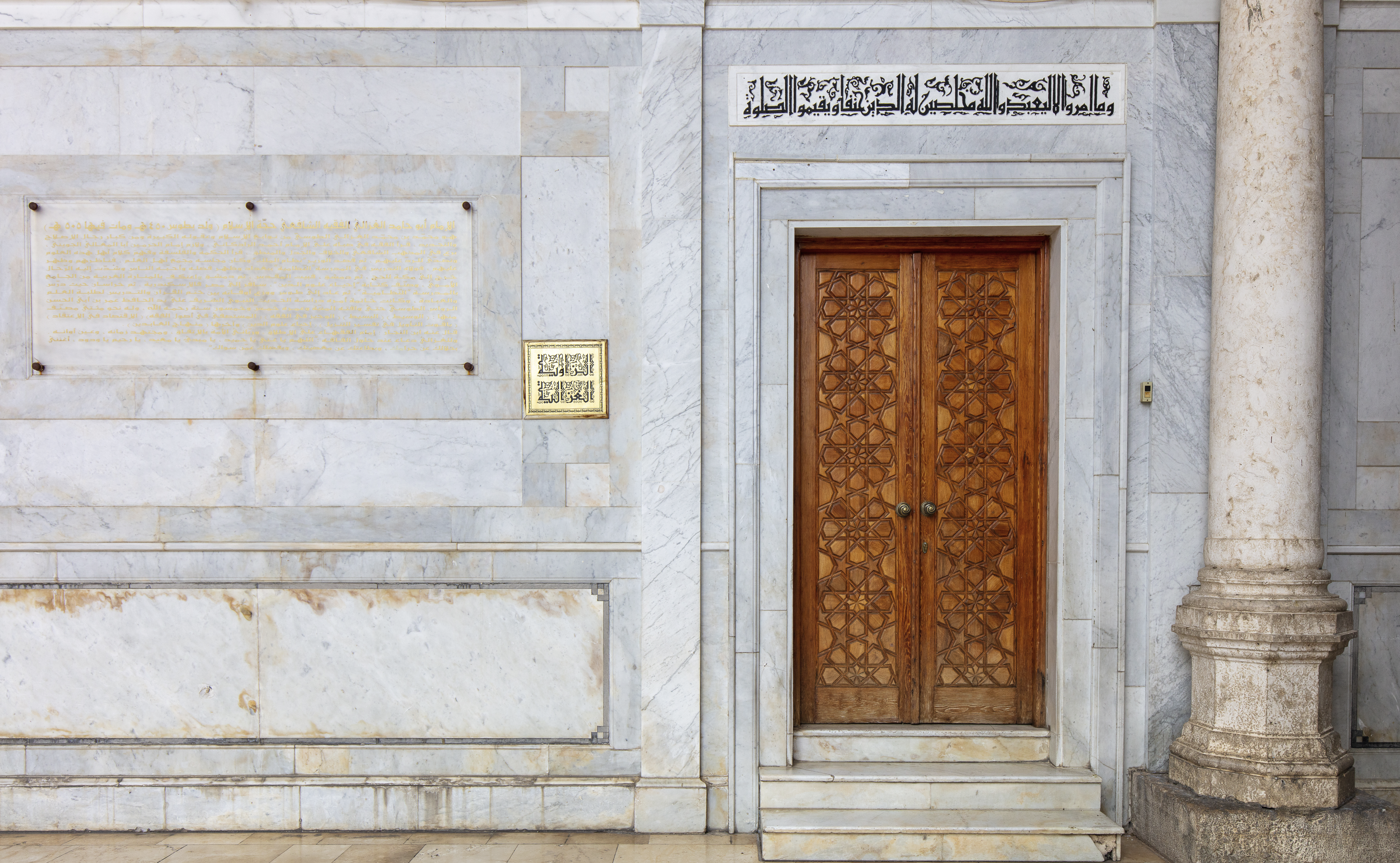
Entrance to the Imam al-Ghazali's room inside the Umayyad Mosque

Al-Ghazālī returned to Nishapur in Dhu al-Qa'da 499 (July 1106) and resumed teaching at the Nizamiyya there. As he states in al-Munqidh (pp. 65–68), which is understood to have been written during this period of seclusion:

"Before I was teaching the knowledge that brought prestige and position…; now, however, I am calling to the knowledge that leads one to renounce position."

== Works ==
A total of about 70 works can be attributed to al-Ghazali. He is also known to have written a fatwa against the Taifa kings of al-Andalus, declaring them to be unprincipled, not fit to rule and that they should be removed from power. This fatwa was used by Yusuf ibn Tashfin to justify his conquest of al-Andalus.

=== The Incoherence of the Philosophers ===
Al-Ghazali's 11th-century book titled The Incoherence of the Philosophers (Tahāfut al-Falāsifa) marked a major turn in Islamic epistemology. The encounter with skepticism led al-Ghazali to investigate a form of theological occasionalism, or the belief that all causal events and interactions are not the product of material conjunctions but rather the immediate and present will of God.

In the next century, Ibn Rushd (or Averroes) drafted a lengthy rebuttal of al-Ghazali's Incoherence entitled The Incoherence of the Incoherence; however, the epistemological course of Islamic thought had already been set. Al-Ghazali gave as an example of the illusion of independent laws of cause the fact that cotton burns when coming into contact with fire. While it might seem as though a natural law was at work, it happened each and every time only because God willed it to happen—the event was "a direct product of divine intervention as any more attention grabbing miracle". Averroes, by contrast insisted while God created the natural law, humans "could more usefully say that fire caused cotton to burn—because creation had a pattern that they could discern."

The Incoherence also marked a turning point in Islamic philosophy in its vehement rejections of Aristotle and Plato. The book took aim at the Falāsifa, a loosely defined group of Islamic philosophers from the 8th through the 11th centuries (most notable among them Avicenna and al-Farabi) who drew intellectually upon the Ancient Greeks.

The influence of Al-Ghazali's book is still debated. Professor of Arabic and Islamic Science George Saliba in 2007 argued that the decline of science in the 11th century has been overstated, pointing to continuing advances, particularly in astronomy, as late as the 14th century.

Professor of Mathematics Nuh Aydin wrote in 2012 that "it is a widespread belief among orientalists that one of the major factors, if not the single most important reason, for the decline of science in the Islamic world after its golden age is al-Ghazali's attack on philosophers". The attack peaked in his book Incoherence, whose central idea of theological occasionalism implies that philosophers cannot give rational explanations to either metaphysical or physical questions. The idea caught on and nullified the critical thinking in the Islamic world.

On the other hand, author and journalist Hassan Hassan in 2012 argued that while indeed scientific thought in Islam was stifled in the 11th century, the person mostly to blame is not al-Ghazali but Nizam al-Mulk.

=== The Revival of Religious Sciences ===
Another of al-Ghazali's major works is The Revival of the Religious Sciences (Iḥyāʾ ʿUlūm al-Dīn) ]. It covers almost all fields of Islamic sciences: fiqh (Islamic jurisprudence), kalam (theology) and sufism.

It contains four major sections: Acts of Worship (Rub' al-'ibadat), Norms of Daily Life (Rub' al-'adatat), The Ways to Perdition (Rub' al-muhlikat) and The Ways to Salvation (Rub' al-munjiyat). The Revival became the most frequently recited Islamic text after the Qur'an and the hadith. Its great achievement was to bring orthodox Sunni theology and Sufi mysticism together in a useful, comprehensive guide to every aspect of Muslim life and death. The book was well received by Islamic scholars such as Nawawi who stated that: "Were the books of Islam all to be lost, excepting only the Ihya', it would suffice to replace them all." This reception, however, was not universal as the book was burned in Almoravid Spain in 1109 and 1143 as al-Ghazali criticised the fuqaha for meddling in politics and due to al-Ghazali's syncretism and support of Sufism. Allegedly, being outraged upon hearing of the burning of his book, al-Ghazali foretold the rise of the Almohad dynasty and invested its founder Ibn Tumart with the duty to overthrow the Almoravid rule.

=== The Alchemy of Happiness ===
The Alchemy of Happiness is a rewritten version of The Revival of the Religious Sciences. After the existential crisis that caused him to completely re-examine his way of living and his approach to religion, al-Ghazali put together The Alchemy of Happiness. This book was written in Persian rather than the Arabic of his other major works.

=== Disciplining the Soul ===
One of the key sections of Ghazali's Revival of the Religious Sciences is Disciplining the Soul, which focuses on the internal struggles that every Muslim will face over the course of his lifetime. The first chapter primarily focuses on how one can develop himself into a person with positive attributes and good personal characteristics . The second chapter has a more specific focus: sexual satisfaction and gluttony. Here, Ghazali states that indeed every man has these desires and needs, and that it is natural to want these things. However, the Islamic prophet Muhammad explicitly states that there must be a middle ground for man, in order to practice the tenets of Islam faithfully. The ultimate goal that Ghazali is presenting not only in these two chapters, but in the entirety of The Revival of the Religious Sciences, is that there must be moderation in every aspect of the soul of a man, an equilibrium. These two chapters were the 22nd and 23rd chapters, respectively, in Ghazali's Revival of the Religious Sciences.

=== The Eternity of the World ===
Al-Ghazali crafted his rebuttal of the Aristotelian viewpoint on the creation of the world in The Eternity of the World. Al-Ghazali essentially formulates two main arguments for what he views as a sacrilegious thought process. Central to the Aristotelian approach is the concept that motion will always precede motion, or in other words, a force will always create another force, and therefore for a force to be created, another force must act upon that force. This means that in essence time stretches infinitely both into the future and into the past, which therefore proves that God did not create the universe at one specific point in time. Al-Ghazali counters this by first stating that if the world was created with exact boundaries, then in its current form there would be no need for a time before the creation of the world by God.

=== The Decisive Criterion for Distinguishing Islam from Clandestine Unbelief ===
Al-Ghazali lays out in The Decisive Criterion for Distinguishing Islam from Clandestine Unbelief his approach to Muslim orthodoxy. Ghazali veers from the often hardline stance of many of his contemporaries during this time period and states that as long as one believes in Muhammad and God himself, there are many different ways to practice Islam and that any of the many traditions practiced in good faith by believers should not be viewed as heretical by other Muslims. While Ghazali does state that any Muslim practicing Islam in good faith is not guilty of apostasy, he does outline in The Criterion that there is one standard of Islam that is more correct than the others, and that those practicing the faith incorrectly should be moved to change. In Ghazali's view, only Muhammad himself could deem a faithfully practicing Muslim an infidel, and his work was a reaction to the religious persecution and strife that occurred often during this time period between various Islamic sects.

=== Deliverance from Error ===
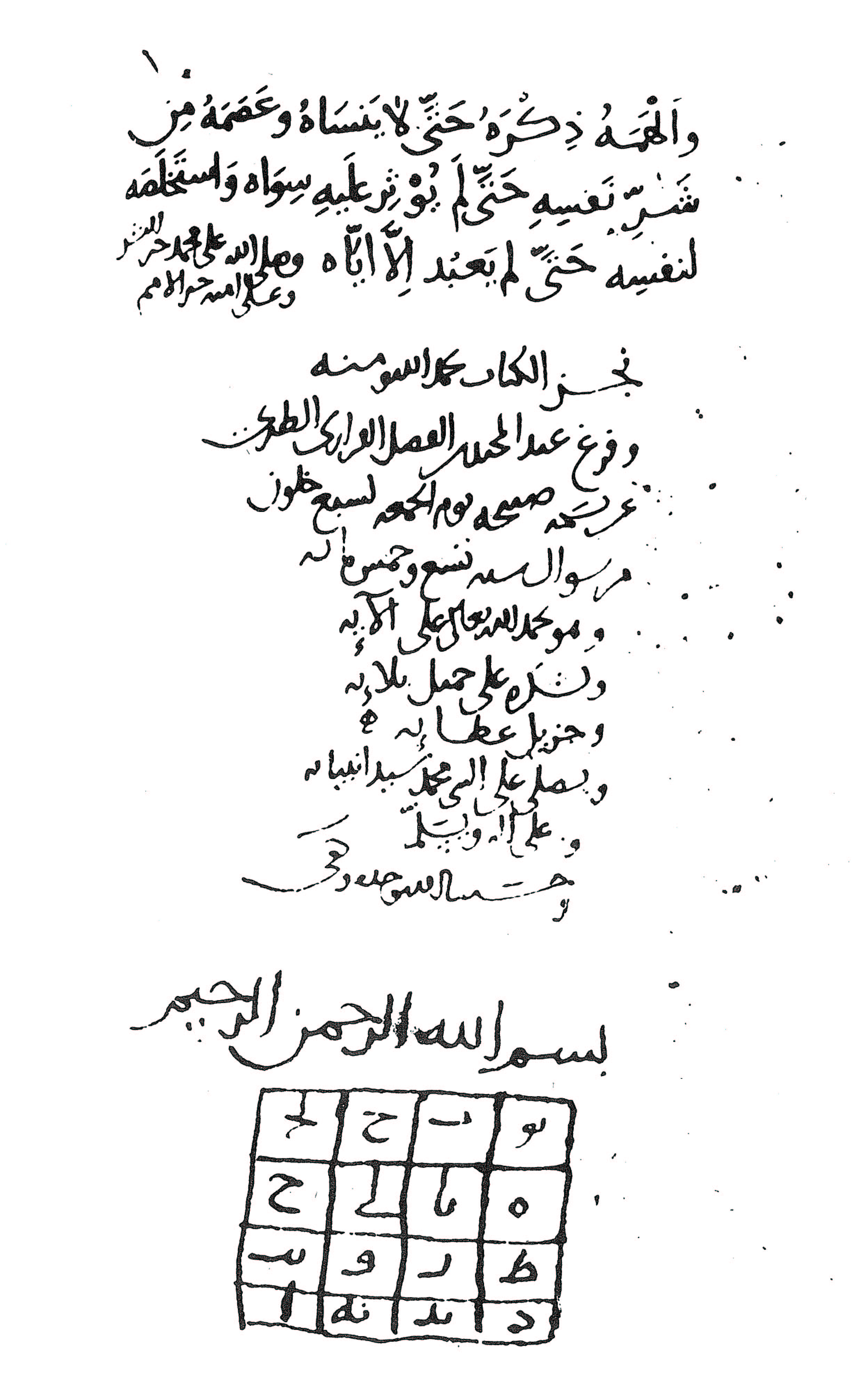
Last page of al-Ghazali's autobiography in MS Istanbul, Shehid Ali Pasha no. 1712, dated AH 509 (AD 1115–1116).

The autobiography al-Ghazali wrote towards the end of his life, Deliverance From Error (المنقذ من الضلال al-Munqidh min al-Dalal), is considered a work of major importance. In it, al-Ghazali recounts how, once a crisis of epistemological skepticism had been resolved by "a light which God Most High cast into my breast ... the key to most knowledge," he studied and mastered the arguments of kalam, Islamic philosophy, and Ismailism. Though appreciating what was valid in the first two of these, at least, he determined that all three approaches were inadequate and found ultimate value only in the mystical experience and insight he attained as a result of following Sufi practices. William James, in Varieties of Religious Experience, considered the autobiography an important document for "the purely literary student who would like to become acquainted with the inwardness of religions other than the Christian" because of the scarcity of recorded personal religious confessions and autobiographical literature from this period outside the Christian tradition.

=== Works in Persian ===
Al-Ghazali wrote most of his works in Persian and in Arabic. His most important Persian work is The Alchemy of Happiness (Kimiya-yi sa'adat). It is al-Ghazali's own Persian version of The Revival of Religious Sciences in Arabic, but a shorter work. It is one of the outstanding works of 11th-century-Persian literature. The book was published several times in Tehran by the edition of Hussain Khadev-jam, a renowned Iranian scholar. It is translated to English, Arabic, Turkish, Urdu, Azerbaijani and other languages.

Another authentic work of al-Ghazali is the so-called "first part" of the Nasihat al-muluk (Counsel for kings), addressed to the Saljuqid ruler of Khurasan Ahmad b. Malik-shah Sanjar (r. 490-552/1097-1157). The text was written after an official reception at his court in 503/1109 and upon his request. Al-Ghazali was summoned to Sanjar because of the intrigues of his opponents and their criticism of his student's compilation in Arabic, al-Mankhul min taʿliqat al-usul (The sifted notes on the fundamentals), in addition to his refusal to continue teaching at the Nizamiyya of Nishapur. After the reception, al-Ghazali had, apparently, a private audience with Sanjar, during which he quoted a verse from the Quran 14:24: "Have you not seen how Allah sets forth a parable of a beautiful phrase (being) like a beautiful tree, whose roots are firm and whose branches are in Heaven." The genuine text of the Nasihat al-muluk, which is actually an official epistle with a short explanatory note on al-Manḵul added on its frontispiece.

The majority of other Persian texts, ascribed to him with the use of his fame and authority, especially in the genre of Mirrors for Princes, are either deliberate forgeries fabricated with different purposes or compilations falsely attributed to him. The most famous among them is Ay farzand (O Child!). This is undoubtedly a literary forgery fabricated in Persian one or two generations after al-Ghazali's death. The sources used for the forgery consist of two genuine letters by al-Ghazali's (number 4, in part, and number 33, totally); both appear in the Fazaʾil al-anam. Another source is a letter known as ʿAyniya and written by Muhammad's younger brother Majd al-Din Ahmad al-Ghazali (d. 520/1126) to his famous disciple ʿAyn al-Quzat Hamadani (492-526/1098-1131); the letter was published in the Majmuʿa-yi athar-i farsi-yi Ahmad-i Ghazali (Collection of the Persian writings of Ahmad Ghazali). The other is ʿAyn al-Quzat's own letter, published in the Namaha-yi ʿAyn al-Quzat Hamadani (Letters by ʿAyn al-Quzat Hamadani). Later, Ay farzand was translated into Arabic and became famous as Ayyuha al-walad, the Arabic equivalent of the Persian title. The earliest manuscripts with the Arabic translation date from the second half of the 16th and most of the others from the 17th century. The earliest known secondary translation from Arabic into Ottoman Turkish was done in 983/1575. In modern times, the text was translated from Arabic into many European languages and published innumerable times in Turkey as Eyyühe'l-Veled or Ey Oğul.

A less famous Pand-nama (Book of counsel) also written in the genre of advice literature is a very late compilatory letter of an unknown author formally addressed to some ruler and falsely attributed to al-Ghazali, obviously because it consists of many fragments borrowed mostly from various parts of the Kimiya-yi saʿadat.

== Influence ==
During his life, Al-Ghazali wrote over seventy books on science, Islamic philosophy, and Sufism. Al-Ghazali played a major role in integrating Sufism with Shariah. He was also the first to present a formal description of Sufism in his works. His works also strengthened the status of Sunni Islam against other schools. The Batinite (Ismailism) had emerged in Persian territories and were gaining more and more power during al-Ghazali's period, as Nizam al-Mulk was assassinated by the members of Ismailis. In his Fada'ih al-Batiniyya (The Infamies of the Esotericists) al-Ghazali declared them unbelievers whose blood may be spilled. Al-Ghazali succeeded in gaining widespread acceptance for Sufism at the expense of philosophy. At the same time, in his refutation of philosophers he made use of their philosophical categories and thus helped to give them wider circulation.

The staple of his religious philosophy was arguing that the creator was the center point of all human life that played a direct role in all world affairs. Al-Ghazali's influence was not limited to Islam, but in fact his works were widely circulated among Christian and Hebrew scholars and philosophers. Western scholars influenced by al-Ghazali include Dante, Thomas Aquinas, and David Hume. Moses Ben Maimon, a Jewish theologian was deeply influenced by the works of al-Ghazali. One of the more notable achievements of al-Ghazali was his writing and reform of education that laid out the path of Islamic Education from the 12th to the 19th centuries. Al-Ghazali's works were heavily relied upon by Islamic mathematicians and astronomers such as Nasir al-Din al-Tusi.

Al-Ghazali believed himself to be more mystical or religious than he was philosophical; however, he is more widely regarded by some scholars as a leading figure of Islamic philosophy and thought. He describes his philosophical approach as a seeker of true knowledge, a deeper understanding of the philosophical and scientific, and a better understanding of mysticism and cognition. The period following Ghazali "has tentatively been called the Golden Age of Arabic philosophy" initiated by Ghazali's successful integration of logic into the Islamic seminary Madrasah curriculum.

Ghazali was cited by Isaac Abravanel to argue that the Greeks borrowed their scientific and philosophical knowledge from Jewish sources.

== Number of works ==
Al-Ghazali mentioned the number of his works "more than 70" in one of his letters to Sultan Sanjar in the late years of his life. Some "five dozen" are plausibly identifiable, and several hundred attributed works, many of them duplicates because of varying titles, are doubtful or spurious.

The tradition of falsely attributing works to al-Ghazali increased in the 13th century, after the dissemination of the large corpus of works by Ibn Arabi.

Bibliographies have been published by William Montgomery Watt (The Works Attributed to Al-Ghazali), Maurice Bouyges (Essai de chronologie des oeuvres d'Al-Ghazali) and others.

Abdel Rahman Badawi's bibliography of all works attributed to Al-Ghazali
| Pages | Content |
|---|---|
| 1–72 | works definitely written by al-Ghazali |
| 73–95 | works of doubtful attribution |
| 96–127 | works which are almost certainly not those of al-Ghazali |
| 128–224 | are the names of the Chapters or Sections of al-Ghazali's books that are mistakenly thought by him |
| 225–273 | books written by other authors on al-Ghazali's works |
| 274–389 | books of other unknown scholars/writers regarding al-Ghazali's life and personality |
| 389–457 | the name of the manuscripts of al-Ghazali's works in different libraries of the world: |

Short List of Major Works of Gazali
| Title | Description | Type |
|---|---|---|
| al-Munqidh min al-dalal | Rescuer from Error | Theology |
| Hujjat al-Haq | Proof of the Truth | Theology |
| al-Iqtisād fī al-iʿtiqad | The Moderation in Belief | Theology |
| Iljām al-Awām an Ilm il-Kalām | Bridling the Common Folk Away From the Science of Theological Speculation | Theology |
| al-maqsad al-asna fi sharah asma' Allahu al-husna | The best means in explaining God's Beautiful Names | Theology |
| Jawahir al-Qur'an wa duraruh | Jewels of the Qur'an and Its Pearls | Theology |
| Faysal al-tafriqa bayn al-Islam wa-l-zandaqa | The Criterion of Distinction between Islam and Clandestine Unbelief | Theology |
| al-radd al-jamil li-ilahiyyat ‘Isa bi-sarih al-Injil | The Excellent Refutation of the Divinity of Jesus through the Text of the Gospel | Theology |
| Mishkāt al-Anwār | The Niche for Lights, a commentary on the Verse of Light | Theology |
| Tafsir al-yaqut al-ta'wil | | Theology |
| Mizan al-'amal | Criterion of Action | Tasawwuf |
| Ihya'e Ulum-ed'Deen | The Revival of the Religious Sciences | Tasawwuf |
| Bidayat al-hidayah | The Beginning of Guidance | Tasawwuf |
| Kimiya-yi sa'ādat | The Alchemy of Happiness [a résumé of Ihya'ul ulum, in Persian] | Tasawwuf |
| Nasihat al-muluk | Counseling Kings in Persian | Tasawwuf |
| al-Munqidh min al-dalal | Rescuer from Error | Tasawwuf |
| Minhaj al-'Abidin | Methodology for the Worshipers | Tasawwuf |
| Fada'ih al-Batiniyya | The Infamies of the Esotericists, a refutation of esoteric Sufism in general and Isma'ili doctrines in particular | Tasawwuf |
| Maqasid al falasifa | Aims of the Philosophers written in the beginning of his life, in favour of philosophy and presenting the basic theories in Philosophy, mostly influenced by Avicenna's works | Philosophy |
| Tahāfut al-Falāsifah | The Incoherence of the Philosophers refutes the Greek Philosophy aiming at Avicenna and al-Farabi; and of which Ibn Rushd wrote his famous refutation Tahāfut al-Tahāfut (The Incoherence of the Incoherence) | Philosophy |
| Miyar al-Ilm fi fan al-Mantiq | Criterion of Knowledge in the Art of Logic | Philosophy |
| Mihak al-Nazar fi al-mantiq | Touchstone of Reasoning in Logic | Philosophy |
| al-Qistas al-mustaqim | The Correct Balance | Philosophy |
| Fatawy al-Ghazali | Verdicts of al-Ghazali | Jurisprudence |
| al-wajiz fi fiqh al-imam al-shafi’i | The Condensed in Imam Shafi’i’s Jurisprudence | Jurisprudence |
| Kitab tahzib al-Isul | Prunning on Legal Theory | Jurisprudence |
| al-Mustasfa fi 'ilm al-isul | The Clarified in Legal Theory | Jurisprudence |
| Asas al-Qiyas | Foundation of Analogical reasoning | Jurisprudence |
| The Jerusalem Tract | | Jurisprudence |

== Economic philosophy ==
Al-Ghazali's economic philosophy was primarily influenced by his Islamic beliefs. He argued that the importance of economic activity lay both in its benefit to society, as well being necessary for salvation.

He established three goals of economic activity that he believed were part of one's religious obligation: "achievement of self-sufficiency for one's survival; provision for the well-being of one's progeny; and provision for assisting those in economic need." He argued that subsistence living, or living in a way that provides the basic necessities for only one's family, would not be an acceptable practice to be held by the general population because of the detrimental results that he believed that would bring upon the economy, but he acknowledged that some people may choose to live the subsistence lifestyle at their own will for the sake of their personal religious journey. Conversely, he discouraged people from purchasing or possessing excessive material items, suggesting that any additional money earned could be given to provide for the poor.

Al-Ghazali believed that the imposition of income equality in society should not be a necessity. Instead, he advocated for individuals to be guided by the "spirit of Islamic brotherhood," encouraging them to willingly share their wealth. However, he acknowledged that this ideal isn't universally practiced. According to him, earned wealth can serve two potential purposes. The first is for the good of oneself, which includes maintaining one's own health and that of their family, as well as extending care to others and engaging in actions beneficial to the Islamic community. The other is what al-Ghazali would consider misuse, spending it selfishly on extravagant or unnecessary material items.

In terms of trade, al-Ghazali discussed the necessity of exchanging goods across close cities as well as larger borders because it allows more goods, which may be necessary and not yet available, to be accessible to more people in various locations. He recognized the necessity of trade and its overall beneficial effect on the economy, but making money in that way might not be considered the most virtuous in his beliefs. He did not support people taking "excessive" profits from their trade sales.

== Reception of work ==
According to William Montgomery Watt, al-Ghazali was considered to be the mujaddid ("Reviver") of his age. Many, perhaps most, later Muslims concurred and, according to Watt, some have even considered him to be the greatest Muslim after Muhammad.

As an example, the Islamic scholar al-Safadi stated:

Muhammad ibn Muhammad ibn Muhammad ibn Ahmad, the Proof of Islam, Ornament of the Faith, Abu Hamid al-Tusi (al-Ghazali) the Shafi'ite jurist, was in his later years without rival.

and the jurist, al-Yafi'i stated:

He was called The Proof of Islam and undoubtedly was worthy of the name, absolutely trustworthy (in respect of the Faith) How many an epitome (has he given) us setting forth the basic principles of religion: how much that was repetitive has he summarised, and epitomised what was lengthy. How many a simple explanation has he given us of what was hard to fathom, with brief elucidation and clear solution of knotty problems. He used moderation, being quiet but decisive in silencing an adversary, though his words were like a sharp sword-thrust in refuting a slanderer and protecting the high-road of guidance.

The Shafi'i jurist al-Subki stated:

"If there had been a prophet after Muhammad, al-Ghazali would have been the man".

Also a widely considered Sunni scholar, al-Dhahabi, in his praise of al-Ghazali wrote: "Al-Ghazzaali, the imaam and shaykh, the prominent scholar, Hujjat al-Islam, the wonder of his time, Zayn al-Deen Abu Haamid Muhammad ibn Muhammad ibn Muhammad ibn Ahmad al-Toosi al-Shaafa'i al-Ghazzaali, the author of many books and one possessed of utter intelligence. He studied fiqh in his own town, then he moved to Nisapur in the company of a group of students. He stayed with the Imaam al-Haramayn and gained a deep knowledge of fiqh within a short period. He became well-versed in 'ilm al-kalaam and debate, until he became the best of debater."

Ibn Rushd (Averroes), a rationalist, famously responded that "to say that philosophers are incoherent is itself to make an incoherent statement." Rushd's book, The Incoherence of the Incoherence, attempted to refute al-Ghazali's views, but the work was not well received in the Muslim community.

According to historian Firas Alkhateeb, "When one reads Imam al-Ghazali's works at a very superficial level, one can easily misunderstand what he is saying as anti-scientific in general. The truth, however, is that al-Ghazali's only warning to students is to not fully accept all the beliefs and ideas of a scholar simply because of his achievements in mathematics and science. By issuing such a warning, al-Ghazali is in fact protecting the scientific enterprise for future generations by insulating it from being mixed with theoretical philosophy that could eventually dilute science itself to a field based on conjecture and reasoning alone."

Al-Ghazali has been seen by Orientalist scholars as causing a decline in scientific advancement in Islam, because of his refutation of the new philosophies of his time. He purportedly saw danger in the statements made by philosophers that suggested that God was not all-knowing or even non-existent, which strongly contradicted his conservative Islamic belief. This position has been challenged, however. The following statement made by al-Ghazali has been described as evidence that he was not against scientific advancement: "Great indeed is the crime against religion committed by anyone who supposes that Islam is to be championed by the denial of mathematical sciences." This sentence, the source of which is not indicated in the cited book, is taken from Deliverance from Error. Ghazali does not mean that neglecting the study of mathematics would be a crime against science or against reason, but that rejecting them is a crime against religion. Its aim is not to promote the study of mathematics: it is to condemn the attitude which consists in considering them as rivals of religion. For him, religion has nothing to fear from them, because they do not deal with the same subjects. To condemn the study of mathematics for fear that it endangers religion is to mistake the place of each of them. This is clarified by the sentence which immediately follows: "For the revealed Law nowhere undertakes to deny or affirm these sciences, and the latter nowhere address themselves to religious matters." A few pages later, he writes that the books of the philosophers must be banned - he defines philosophy as composed of six branches: mathematical, logical, physical, metaphysical, political, and moral. Al-Ghazali notably influenced Ibn Rushd, Ayn al-Quzat Hamadani, al-Nawawi, Ibn Tumart, Fakhruddin Razi, Suyuti, Tan Malaka, Thomas Aquinas, David Hume, Sayf al-Din al-Amidi, Asad Mayhani, Ali al-Qari, Muhammad Ibn Yahya al-Janzi.

== See also ==
- List of Ash'aris
- List of Muslim theologians
- List of Sufis
- Mujaddid
- Nasîhatnâme

Early Islamic scholars

Muhammad, The final Messenger of God (570–632) the Constitution of Medina, taught the Quran, and advised his companions
Abdullah ibn Masud (died 653) taught | Ali (607–661) fourth caliph taught | Aisha, Muhammad's wife and Abu Bakr's daughter taught | Abd Allah ibn Abbas (618–687) taught | Zayd ibn Thabit (610–660) taught | Umar (579–644) second caliph taught | Abu Hurairah (603–681) taught
Alqama ibn Qays (died 681) taught | Husayn ibn Ali (626–680) taught | Qasim ibn Muhammad ibn Abi Bakr (657–725) taught and raised by Aisha | Urwah ibn Zubayr (died 713) taught by Aisha, he then taught | Said ibn al-Musayyib (637–715) taught | Abdullah ibn Umar (614–693) taught | Abd Allah ibn al-Zubayr (624–692) taught by Aisha, he then taught
Ibrahim al-Nakha’i taught | Ali ibn Husayn Zayn al-Abidin (659–712) taught | Hisham ibn Urwah (667–772) taught | Ibn Shihab al-Zuhri (died 741) taught | Salim ibn Abd-Allah ibn Umar taught | Umar ibn Abdul Aziz (682–720) raised and taught by Abdullah ibn Umar
Hammad ibn Abi Sulayman taught | Muhammad al-Baqir (676–733) taught | Farwah bint al-Qasim Jafar's mother
Abu Hanifa (699–767) wrote Al Fiqh Al Akbar and Kitab Al-Athar, jurisprudence followed by Sunni, Sunni Sufi, Barelvi, Deobandi, Zaidiyyah and originally by the Fatimid and taught | Zayd ibn Ali (695–740) | Ja'far bin Muhammad Al-Baqir (702–765) Muhammad and Ali's great great grand son, jurisprudence followed by Shia, he taught | Malik ibn Anas (711–795) wrote Muwatta, jurisprudence from early Medina period now mostly followed by Maliki Sunnis in North Africa, and taught | Al-Waqidi (748–822) wrote history books like Kitab al-Tarikh wa al-Maghazi, student of Malik ibn Anas | Abu Muhammad Abdullah ibn Abdul Hakam (died 829) wrote biographies and history books, student of Malik ibn Anas
Abu Yusuf (729–798) wrote Usul al-fiqh | Muhammad al-Shaybani (749–805) | al-Shafi‘i (767–820) wrote Al-Risala, jurisprudence followed by Shafi'i Sunnis and Sufis, and taught | Ismail ibn Ibrahim | Ali ibn al-Madini (778–849) wrote The Book of Knowledge of the Companions | Ibn Hisham (died 833) wrote early history and As-Sirah an-Nabawiyyah, Muhammad's biography
Isma'il ibn Ja'far (719–775) | Musa al-Kadhim (745–799) | Ahmad ibn Hanbal (780–855) wrote Musnad Ahmad ibn Hanbal jurisprudence followed by Hanbali Sunnis and Sufis | Muhammad al-Bukhari (810–870) wrote Sahih al-Bukhari hadith books | Muslim ibn al-Hajjaj (815–875) wrote Sahih Muslim hadith books | Dawud al-Zahiri (815–883/4) founded the Zahiri school | Muhammad ibn Isa at-Tirmidhi (824–892) wrote Jami` at-Tirmidhi hadith books | Al-Baladhuri (died 892) wrote early history Futuh al-Buldan, Genealogies of the Nobles
Ibn Majah (824–887) wrote Sunan ibn Majah hadith book | Abu Dawood (817–889) wrote Sunan Abu Dawood Hadith Book
Muhammad ibn Ya'qub al-Kulayni (864- 941) wrote Kitab al-Kafi hadith book followed by Twelver Shia | Muhammad ibn Jarir al-Tabari (838–923) wrote History of the Prophets and Kings, Tafsir al-Tabari | Abu al-Hasan al-Ash'ari (874–936) wrote Maqālāt al-islāmīyīn, Kitāb al-luma, Kitāb al-ibāna 'an usūl al-diyāna
Ibn Babawayh (923–991) wrote Man La Yahduruhu al-Faqih jurisprudence followed by Twelver Shia | Sharif Razi (930–977) wrote Nahj al-Balagha followed by Twelver Shia | Nasir al-Din al-Tusi (1201–1274) wrote jurisprudence books followed by Ismaili and Twelver Shia | Al-Ghazali (1058–1111) wrote The Niche for Lights, The Incoherence of the Philosophers, The Alchemy of Happiness on Sufism | Rumi (1207–1273) wrote Masnavi, Diwan-e Shams-e Tabrizi on Sufism
Key: Some of Muhammad's Companions | Key: Taught in Medina | Key: Taught in Iraq | Key: Worked in Syria | Key: Travelled extensively collecting the sayings of Muhammad and compiled books of hadith | Key: Worked in Persia
