= Asad Mayhani =

Persian scholar, born in Mayhana

Asad al-Mayhani

Personal life
- Born: 1068
- Died: 1132 (aged 63–64)
- Era: Islamic Golden Age
- Region: Persia

Religious life
- Religion: Islam
- Jurisprudence: Shafi'i
- Creed: Ash'ari

Muslim leader
- Influenced by: Al-Ghazali

Abul-Fath Asad ibn Muhammad al-Mayhani (Arabic: أبو الفتح أسد بن محمد الميهاني) was a Persian scholar, who was born in Mayhana. He was an immediate follower of Al-Ghazali.

== Biography ==
According to Ibn al-Jawzi and Taj al-Din al-Subki, Asad Mayhani was a highly influential scholar of Islamic law. The works (al-Taliqa or the Notes) of Asad al-Mayhani were adopted by the Nizamiyya Madrassa in Baghdad. He studied Islamic Jurisprudence with Abu-Muzaffar al-Samani (who was the grandfather of the historian Abu Saad Al-Samani) at the Nizamiyya madrasa in Merw & then moved to Ghazna, where he became famous.

Abd al-Latif al-Baghdadi said that his father studied "The Notes" of Asad al-Mayhani, who was very famous at that time.

Ibn al-Jawzi said that many Hanbalites studied "the Notes" of Asad al-Mayhani, even though he was a Shafi'i.

In the thirteenth century, Ibn Kathir said Asad Mayhani's "Notes" were still popular.

Asad al-Mayhani said about the works of al-Ghazali:

None will arrive at al-Ghazali's level of insights and his virtue unless he reaches — or at least almost reaches — intellectual perfection.

== Death ==
Asad Mayhani died in 527/1132 in Hamadan.

== See also ==
- List of Ash'aris and Maturidis
