= The Aims of the Philosophers =

Book by Al-Ghazali

Maqasid al Falasifa (The Aims of the Philosophers)
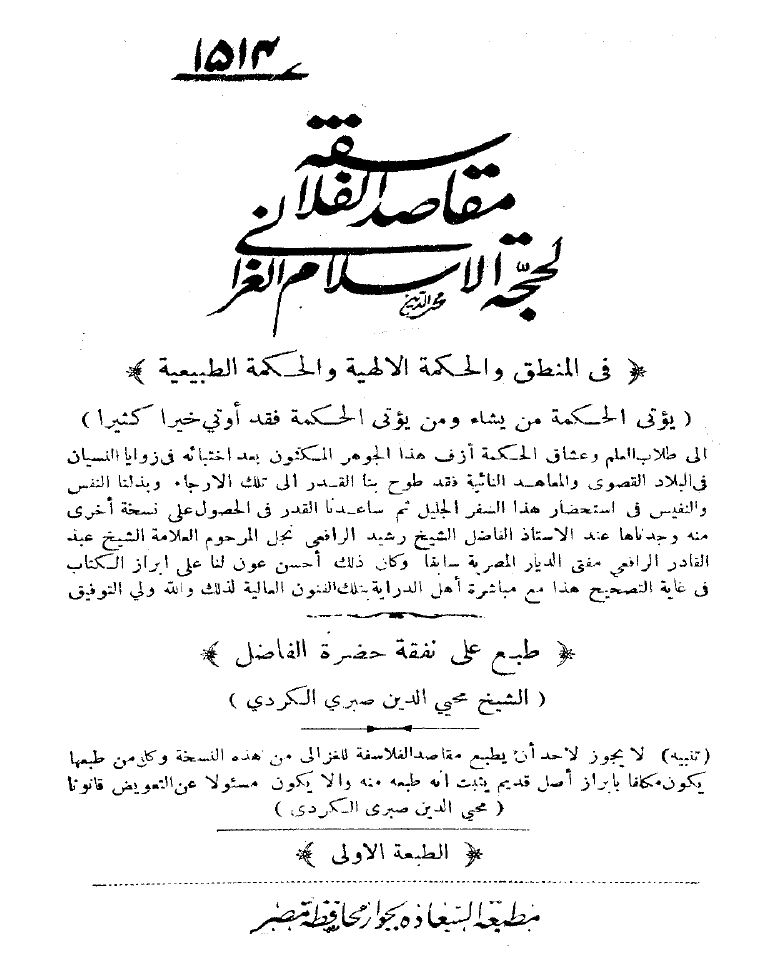
- Author: Al-Ghazālī
- Language: Arabic
- Subject: Philosophy
- Publication date: 12th century
- Publication place: Seljuk Empire

Maqasid al Falasifa (Arabic: مقاصد الفلاسفة), or The Aims of the Philosophers was written by Abū Ḥāmid Muḥammad ibn Muḥammad al-Ghazali. Influenced by Avicenna's works, he wrote this book presenting the basic theories of philosophy. In this book, he explained in detail what philosophy is and described basic entities like judgement, concept, premise and logic.

Ghazali stated that one must be well versed in the ideas of the philosophers before setting out to refute their ideas. He also stated that he did not find other branches of philosophy including physics, logic, astronomy or mathematics problematic. After writing Maqasid al Falasifa, he wrote another book Tahāfut al-Falāsifa, criticizing the Avicennian school of early Islamic philosophy.

== Influence ==
This book was influential in Europe and was one of the first to be translated from Arabic to Latin (12th century). A portion of the book is also translated into Hebrew and English. Muhammad Hanif Nadvi translated it into Urdu and is titled "Qadim Unani Falsafa" (Ancient Greek Philosophy).

== See also ==
- The Incoherence of the Philosophers
