= Rashidun army =

Armed forces of the Muslim Rashidun Caliphate

- جيش الراشدين
- Active: 632–661
- Allegiance: Rashidun Caliphate
- Type: Land force
- Provincial Headquarters (Amsar): Medina (632–657); Kufa (657–661); Homs (634–661); Damascus (635–661) al-Urdunn (639–661); Basra (632–661); Filastin (660–661); Fustat (641–661)
- Engagements: Ridda wars; Early Muslim conquests; First Fitna

Commanders
- Supreme Commanders: Abu Bakr; Umar ibn al-Khattab; Uthman ibn Affan; Ali ibn Abi Talib
- Notable Commanders: Khalid ibn al-Walid; Abu Ubayda ibn al-Jarrah; Sa'd ibn Abi Waqqas; Amr ibn al-As

The Rashidun army (Arabic: جيش الراشدين) was the core of the Rashidun Caliphate's armed forces during the early Muslim conquests in the 7th century. The army is reported to have maintained a high level of discipline, strategic prowess and organization, granting them successive victories in their various campaigns.

In its time, the Rashidun army was a very powerful and effective force. The three most successful generals of the army were Khalid ibn al-Walid, who conquered Persian Mesopotamia and the Roman Levant, Abu Ubaidah ibn al-Jarrah, who also conquered parts of the Roman Levant, and Amr ibn al-As, who conquered Roman Egypt. The army was a key component in the Rashidun Caliphate's territorial expansion and served as a medium for the early spread of Islam into the territories it conquered.

== Historical overview ==
According to Tarikh at Tabari, the nucleus of the early caliphate forces were formed from the Green Division (al-Katibah al-Khadra), a unit that consisted of early converts from Muhajirun and Ansar that marched on to conquer Mecca.

=== Ridda wars ===
Upon Muhammad's death, the Muslim community was unprepared for the loss of its leader and many experienced a profound shock. Umar was particularly affected, instead declaring that Muhammad had gone to consult with God and would soon return, threatening anyone who would say that Muhammad was dead. Abu Bakr, having returned to Medina, calmed Umar by showing him Muhammad's body, convincing him of his death. He then addressed those who had gathered at the mosque, saying, "If anyone worships Muhammad, Muhammad is dead. If anyone worships God, God is alive, immortal", thus putting an end to any idolising impulse in the population. He then concluded with a verse from the Quran: "Muhammad is no more than an apostle, and many apostles have passed away before him."^{[Quran 3:144]}

Troubles emerged soon after Abu Bakr's succession, with several Arab tribes launching revolts, threatening the unity and stability of the new community and state. These insurgencies and the caliphate's responses to them are collectively referred to as the Ridda wars ("Wars of Apostasy").

The opposition movements came in two forms. One type challenged the political power of the nascent caliphate as well as the religious authority of Islam with the acclamation of rival ideologies, headed by political leaders who claimed the mantle of prophethood in the manner that Muhammad had done. These rebellions include:

- that of the Banu Asad ibn Khuzaymah headed by Tulayha ibn Khuwaylid
- that of the Banu Hanifa headed by Musaylima
- those from among the Banu Taghlib and the Bani Tamim headed by Sajah
- that of the Al-Ansi headed by Al-Aswad Al-Ansi
- Omani rebels led by Laqeet bin Malik

These leaders are all denounced in Islamic histories as "false prophets".

The second form of opposition movement was more strictly political in character. Some of the revolts of this type took the form of tax rebellions in Najd among tribes such as the Banu Fazara and Banu Tamim. Other dissenters, while initially allied with the Muslims, used Muhammad's death as an opportunity to attempt to restrict the growth of the new Islamic state. They include some of the Rabīʿa in Bahrayn, the Azd in Oman, as well as among the Kinda and Khawlan in Yemen.

At their heart, the Ridda movements were challenges to the political and religious supremacy of the Islamic state. Through his success in suppressing the insurrections, Abu Bakr had in effect continued the political consolidation which had begun under Muhammad's leadership with relatively little interruption. By the wars' end, he had established Islamic hegemony over the entire Arabian Peninsula.

=== Military expansions ===
After the Treaty of al-Hudaybiya in 628, Islamic tradition holds that Muhammad sent many letters to the princes, kings, and chiefs of the various tribes and kingdoms of the time, exhorting them to convert to Islam and bow to the order of God. These letters were carried by ambassadors to Persia, Byzantium, Ethiopia, Egypt, Yemen, and Hira (Iraq) on the same day. This assertion has been brought under scrutiny by some modern historians of Islam—notably Grimme and Caetani. Particularly in dispute is the assertion that Khosrau II received a letter from Muhammad, as the Sassanid court ceremony was notoriously intricate, and it is unlikely that a letter from what at the time was a minor regional power would have reached the hands of the Shahanshah.

With regards to Persia, Muslim histories further recount that at the beginning of the seventh year of migration, Muhammad appointed one of his officers, Abd Allah ibn Hudhafa, to carry his letter to Khosrow II inviting him to convert:

In the name of God, the Beneficent, the Merciful. From Muhammad, the Messenger of God, to the great Kisra of Persia. Peace be upon him, who seeks truth and expresses belief in God and in His Prophet and testifies that there are no gods but one God whom has no partners, and who believes that Muhammad is His servant and Prophet. Under the Command of God, I invite you to Him. He has sent me for the guidance of all people so that I may warn them all of His wrath and may present the unbelievers with an ultimatum. Embrace Islam so that you may remain safe. And if you refuse to accept Islam, you will be responsible for the sins of the Magi.

There are differing accounts of the reaction of Khosrau II.

By span from the ascensions of Abu Bakar as caliph until his death, the Rashidun Caliphate expanded steadily; within the span of 24 years, a vast territory was conquered comprising Mesopotamia, the Levant, parts of Anatolia, and most of the Sasanian Empire.

==== Expansions during Abu Bakr's reign ====
Arab Muslims first attacked Sassanid territory in 633, when Khalid ibn al-Walid invaded Mesopotamia (then known as the Sassanid province of Asōristān; roughly corresponding to modern-day Iraq), which was the political and economic centre of the Sassanid state.

==== Expansions during Umar's reign ====
Abu Bakr was aware of Umar's power and ability to succeed him. His was perhaps one of the smoothest transitions of power from one authority to another in the Muslim lands. Before his death, Abu Bakr called Uthman to write his will in which he declared Umar his successor. In his will he instructed Umar to continue the conquests on the Iraqi and Syrian fronts.

Following the transfer of Khalid to the Byzantine front in the Levant, the Muslims eventually lost their holdings to Sassanid counterattacks. The second Muslim invasion began in 636, under Sa'd ibn Abi Waqqas, when a key victory at the Battle of al-Qadisiyyah led to the permanent end of Sassanid control west of modern-day Iran. For the next six years, the Zagros Mountains, a natural barrier, marked the border between the Rashidun Caliphate and the Sassanid Empire. In 642, Umar ordered a full-scale invasion of Persia by the Rashidun army, which led to the complete conquest of the Sassanid Empire by 651. Directing from Medina, a few thousand kilometres away, Umar's quick conquest of Persia in a series of well-coordinated, multi-pronged attacks became his greatest triumph, contributing to his reputation as a great military and political strategist.

The military conquests were partially terminated between 638 and 639 during the years of great famine in Arabia and plague in the Levant. During his reign the Levant, Egypt, Cyrenaica, Tripolitania, Fezzan, eastern Anatolia, almost the whole of the Sassanid Persian Empire including Bactria, Persia, Azerbaijan, Armenia, Caucasus and Makran were annexed to the Rashidun Caliphate. Prior to his death in 644, Umar had ceased all military expeditions apparently to consolidate his rule in recently conquered Roman Egypt and the newly conquered Sassanid Empire (642–644). At his death in November 644, his rule extended from present day Libya in the west to the Indus river in the east and the Oxus river in the north.

Historians estimate more than 4,050 cities were conquered during the reign of Umar.

==== Expansions during Uthman's reign ====
In 644, prior to the complete annexation of Persia by the Arab Muslims, Umar was assassinated by Abu Lu'lu'a Firuz, a Persian craftsman who was captured in battle and brought to Arabia as a slave.

Uthman ibn Affan, the third caliph, was chosen by a committee in Medina, in northwestern Arabia, in23 AH (643/644 CE). The second caliph, Umar ibn al-Khattab, was stabbed by Abu Lu'lu'a Firuz, a Persian slave. On his deathbed, Umar tasked a committee of six with choosing the next caliph among themselves. These six men from the Quraysh, all early companions of the Islamic prophet Muhammad, were

- Ali ibn Abi Talib
- Abd al-Rahman ibn Awf
- Sa'd ibn Abi Waqqas
- Uthman ibn Affan
- Zubayr ibn al-Awwam
- Talha ibn Ubayd Allah

Where they unanimously selected Uthman as the successor. During his rule, Uthman's military style was less centralised as he delegated much military authority to his trusted kinsmen—e.g., Abd Allah ibn Amir, Mu'awiya I and Abd Allah ibn Sa'd—unlike Umar's more centralized policy. Consequently, this more independent policy allowed more expansion until Sindh, in modern Pakistan, which had not been touched during the tenure of Umar.

Mu'awiya I had been appointed the governor of Syria by Umar in 639 to stop Byzantine harassment from the sea during the Arab-Byzantine Wars. He succeeded his elder brother Yazid ibn Abi Sufyan, who died in a plague, along with Abu Ubayda ibn al-Jarrah. Now under Uthman's rule in 649, Mu'awiya was allowed to establish a navy, manned by Monophysitic Christians, Copts, and Jacobite Syrian Christian sailors and Muslim troops, which defeated the Byzantine navy at the Battle of the Masts in 655, opening up the Mediterranean.

In Hijri year 31 (c. 651), Uthman sent Abd Allah ibn al-Zubayr and Abd Allah ibn Sa'd to reconquer the Maghreb, where he met the army of Gregory the Patrician, Exarch of Africa and relative of Heraclius, which is recorded to have numbered between 120,000 or 200,000 soldiers. The opposing forces clashed at Sabuthilag (or Sufetula), which became the name of this battle. Records from al-Bidayah wal Nihayah state that Abd Allah's troops were completely surrounded by Gregory's army. However, Abd Allah ibn al-Zubayr spotted Gregory in his chariot and asked Abd Allah ibn Sa'd to lead a small detachment to intercept him. The interception was successful, and Gregory was slain by Zubayr's ambush party. Consequently, the morale of Byzantine army crumbled and soon they were routed.

Some Muslim sources claim that after the conquest of northern Africa was completed by Muhammad ibn Jarir al-Tabari, Abd Allah ibn Sa'd continued to Spain. Spain had first been invaded some sixty years earlier during the caliphate of Uthman. Other prominent Muslim historians, like Ibn Kathir, have quoted the same narration. In the description of this campaign, two of Abd Allah ibn Sa'd's generals, Abd Allah ibn Nafi ibn Husayn, and Abd Allah ibn Nafi ibn Abd al-Qays, were ordered to invade the coastal areas of Spain by sea, aided by a Berber force. They succeeded in conquering the coastal areas of Al-Andalus. It is not known where the Muslim force landed, what resistance they met, and what parts of Spain they actually conquered. However, it is clear that the Muslims did conquer some portions of Spain during the caliphate of Uthman, presumably establishing colonies on its coast. On this occasion, Uthman is reported to have addressed a letter to the invading force:

Constantinople will be conquered from the side of Al-Andalus. Thus, if you conquer it, you will have the honor of taking the first step towards the conquest of Constantinople. You will have your reward in this behalf both in this world and the next.

Although raids by Berbers and Muslims were conducted against the Visigothic Kingdom in Spain during the late 7th century, there is no evidence that Spain was invaded nor that parts of it were conquered or settled by Muslims prior to the 711 campaign by Tariq.

Abd Allah ibn Sa'd also achieved success in the Caliphate's first decisive naval battle against the Byzantine Empire, the Battle of the Masts.

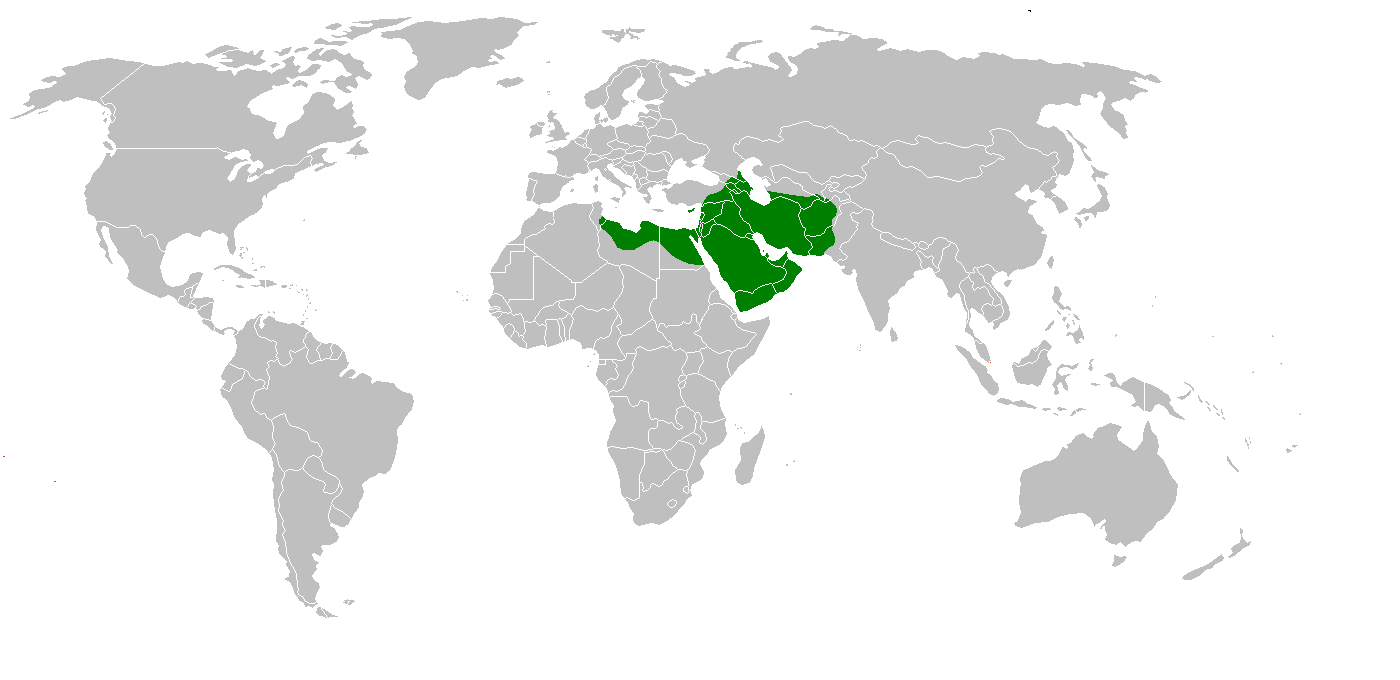
Rashidun Caliphate at its peak under Uthman (654)

To the east, Al-Ahnaf ibn Qays, chief of Banu Tamim and a veteran commander who conquered Shustar earlier, launched a series of further military expansions by further mauling Yazdegerd III near the Oxus River in Turkmenistan and later crushing a military coalition of Sassanid loyalists and the Hephthalite Empire in the Siege of Herat. Later, the governor of Basra, Abd Allah ibn Amir also led a number of successful campaigns, ranging from the suppression of revolts in Fars, Kerman, Sistan, and Khorasan, to the opening of new fronts for conquest in Transoxiana and Afghanistan.

In the next year, 652 AD, Futuh al-Buldan of Al-Baladhuri writes that Balochistan was re-conquered during the campaign against the revolt in Kermān, under the command of Majasha ibn Mas'ud. It was the first time that western Balochistan had come directly under the laws of the Caliphate and it paid an agricultural tribute.

The military campaigns under Uthman's rule were generally successful. Regarding the fate of their adversaries, unlike the Sasanian Persians, the Byzantines, after losing Syria, retreated back to Anatolia. As a result, they also lost Egypt to the invading Rashidun army, although the civil wars among the Muslims halted the war of conquest for many years, and this gave time for the Byzantine Empire to recover.

=== Transition into Umayyad caliphate ===
After Uthman's assassination, Ali was recognized as caliph in Medina, though his support stemmed from the Ansar and the Iraqis, while the bulk of the Quraysh was wary of his rule. The first challenge to his authority came from the Qurayshite leaders Zubayr and Talha. Backed by one of Muhammad's wives, Aisha, they attempted to rally support against Ali among the troops of Basra, prompting the caliph to leave for Iraq's other garrison town, Kufa, where he could better confront his challengers. Ali defeated them at the Battle of the Camel, in which Zubayr and Talha were slain and Aisha consequently entered self-imposed seclusion. Ali's sovereignty was thereafter recognized in Basra and Egypt and he established Kufa as the Caliphate's new capital.

Although Ali was able to replace Uthman's governors in Egypt and Iraq with relative ease, Mu'awiya had developed a solid power-base and an effective military against the Byzantines from the Arab tribes of Syria. Mu'awiya did not claim the caliphate but was determined to retain control of Syria and opposed Ali in the name of avenging his kinsman Uthman, accusing the caliph of culpability in his death. Ali and Mu'awiya fought to a stalemate at the Battle of Siffin in early 657. Ali agreed to settle the matter with Mu'awiya by arbitration. The decision to arbitrate fundamentally weakened Ali's political position as he was forced to negotiate with Mu'awiya on equal terms, while it drove a significant number of his supporters, who became known as the Kharijites, to revolt. Ali's coalition steadily disintegrated and many Iraqi tribal nobles secretly defected to Mu'awiya, while the latter's ally Amr ibn al-As ousted Ali's governor from Egypt in July 658. Ali was assassinated by a Kharijite in January 661. His son Hasan succeeded him but abdicated in return for compensation upon Mu'awiya's arrival to Iraq with his Syrian army in the summer. At that point, Mu'awiya entered Kufa and received the allegiance of the Iraqis.

Later Mu'awiya was formally recognized as caliph in Jerusalem by his Syrian tribal allies, thus starting the long string of Umayyad dynastic rulers.

== Units ==
The first requirement to join the Rashidun caliphate army was to be Muslim. Earlier caliphs such as Abu Bakar and Umar were even stricter in terms of army recruitment as they did not allow any ex-rebels in Ridda Wars. According to Claude Cahen, this strict policy was maintained at least until the Siege of Babylon fortress in Egypt. (Note: Claude Cahen stated the reinforcements from Medina for Amr ibn al As who were still fighting in Egypt only consisted of soldiers who never Apostated during Ridda Wars) However, other sources noted the eastern theater of conquest in Persia are more lenient for recruitment as the caliphate employed former rebels such as Tulayha and Amr ibn Ma'adi Yakrib. Tulayha even played a significant role during a raid against the Persian army during Sa'd's campaign, which was codenamed Yaum Armath(يوم أرماث or "The Day of Disorder") by early Muslim historians. (Note: classical Hadith scholars expressed their skepticism regarding historical narration of Sayf ibn Umar although non narrative historical informations of him was not criticized. al-Hakim (d. 405 AH) wrote: "Sayf is accused of being a heretic. His narrations are abandoned.". Abu Dawud (d. 316 AH) wrote: "Sayf is nothing. He was a liar. Some of his Hadiths were conveyed and the majority of them are denied") The policy of not employing ex-rebels and apostates (Ahl ar Riddah according to Tabari) were retracted by 'Umar during his second half reign.

=== Infantry ===
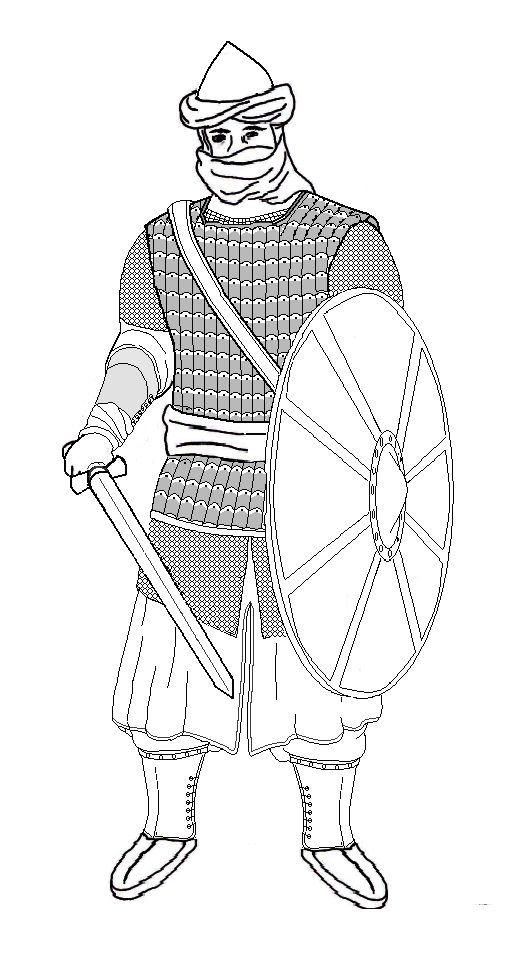
Rashidun soldier wearing an iron-bronze helmet, a chain mail hauberk, and leather lamellar armor. His sword hung from a baldric, and he carries a leather shield.

The standing infantry lines formed the majority of the Rashidun army. They would make repeated charges and withdrawals known as karr wa farr, using spears and swords combined with arrow volleys to weaken the enemies and wear them out. However, the main energy had to still be conserved for a counterattack, supported by a cavalry charge, that would make flanking or encircling movements.

Defensively, the Muslim spearman with their two and a half meter long spears would close ranks, forming a protective wall (Tabi'a) for archers to continue their fire. This close formation stood its ground remarkably well in the first four days of defence in the Battle of the Yarmuk.

Jandora noted the merit of individual skills, bravery, and discipline of Rashidun infantry as the main reason they won battle of the Yarmuk. Jandora pointed out their quality to remain steadfast even against the onslaught of Byzantine cavalry charge, or even when facing the elephant corps of Sassanid.

==== Infantry horses and camels ====
Aside from Donner's report that each caliphate's soldiers possessed camels, Dr Lee Eysturlid noted the Diwan al-Jund around 640 AD has recorded that each caliphate's soldiers already possessed horses. The camels mainly supplied from Al-Rabadha and Diriyah.

==== Armour ====
Reconstructing the military equipment of early Muslim armies is problematic relative to contemporary neighbouring armies such as Byzantium's as the visual representation of the early caliphate armaments was very limited physical material and difficult to date. However, Nicolle theorized the Muslim army used hardened leather scale or lamellar armour produced in Yemen, Iraq and along the Persian Gulf coast. Mail armour was preferred and became more common later during the conquest of neighbouring empires, often being captured as part of the booty. It was known as Dir, and was opened part-way down the chest. To avoid rusting it was polished and stored in a mixture of dust and oil.

Mail shirts were recorded already used by the Arabs before the advent of Islam. During the Battle of Uhud, Jami'at Tirmidhi recorded Zubayr ibn al-Awwam's testimony that Muhammad wearing two layers of mail coat. However, there is still not yet archaeological founding of Arabic armor in such time. David Nicolle are certain the prevalence of leather armour among Arabs since the pre-Islamic era, due to the fact that the leather was one of important commodities which made the Meccan traders rich, which correlated with the war between the Byzantine and Sassanian Empires during 6th century as there was increased demand for such military goods that Nicolle called “military leatherwork".

==== Helmets ====
Muslim headgear included gilded helmets—both pointed and rounded—similar to that of the silver helmets of the Sassanid Empire. The rounded helmet, referred to as "Baidah" ("Egg"), was a standard early Byzantine type composed of two pieces. The pointed helmet was a segmented Central Asian type known as "Tarikah". Mail armour was commonly used to protect the face and neck, either as an aventail from the helmet or as a mail coif the way it had been used by Romano-Byzantine armies since the 5th century. The face was often half covered with the tail of a turban that also served as protection against the strong desert winds.

Another type of helmet used by the Rashidun army were the Mighfars.

==== Swords ====
Sayf was a broad sword with a peculiar hooked pomel used by the Rashidun army. Early Arab chroniclers mentioned two types of swords:

- Saif Anith, which was made of iron
- Saif Fulath or Muzakka, which was made of steel material.

These broad swords came to Arabia through Yemen port during the pre-Islamic ʿĀd and Jurhum era. (Note: Al-Kindi called it "Indian sword" which originated from pre-Islamic Jurhum tribe.) These Indian-made swords were forged from wootz steel. Aside from Yemen, high-quality Indian swords also introduced to pre-Islamic Arab through port of Ubulla, Persian Gulf. The Arabs in Medina during the time of Muhammad were able to manufacture Sayf swords independently. There are records that some nobles made their sword with silver materials, such as Muhammad's sword and Zubayr ibn al-Awwam sword used which reported by from Anas ibn Malik and Hisham are made of silver or contain inscription of silver material. However, there is no archeological trace that such sword found yet.

Curved saber or Shamshir also existed during the early years of the caliphate. This type of saber allegedly belonged to Muhammad and is now in the Topkapi Museum. David Nicolle theorized that this type of saber is probably of central Asian, Avar or Magyar origin. Nicolle theorized it reached the early Muslim Arabs through the contact with Byzantium before the 6th century.

==== Shields ====
Large wooden or wickerwork shields were in use, but most shields were made of leather. For this purpose, the hides of camels and cows were used and it would be anointed, a practice since ancient Hebrew times. During the invasion of the Levant, Byzantine soldiers extensively used elephant-hide shields, which were probably captured and used by the Rashidun army.

==== Spears ====
Long spears which were used by infantry were locally made with the reeds of the Persian Gulf coast. The reeds were similar to that of bamboo. These Arab blacksmiths manufactured infantry spears called al-Ramh. There are two types of this spear:

- Arab blacksmiths used sharpened animal horns for the tip of the blade
- Usual iron which was sharpened and hammered first until it forms the blade.

During the Battle of Badr, Muhammad commanded his companions to use spears for middle-range combat. The raw material for making spears was available in Arabia.

==== Maces ====
The early caliphate army also used blunt weapon such as Mace, which named al-Dabbus. It was a round-headed, Persian style mace

==== Javelins ====
Wahshi ibn Harb, was a renowned javelineer who fought for pagan Quraish during the Battle of Uhud and killed Hamza ibn Abd al-Muttalib with a javelin. After his conversion to Islam, he fought for the caliphate during the Battle of al-Yamama and personally killed apostate leader Musaylima with a javelin throw.

=== Archer ===
Ibn al-Qayyim concludes that Caliph Umar put special emphasis regarding his soldiers to practice extensively archery as the caliph wanted to implement the archery tradition according to the teaching of Muhammad to the military of Rashidun. Rashidun archers were noted for their sharpshooting skill to aim at the eyes of the enemy, such as in the Battle of al-Anbar, where the Rashidun archers shooting the eyes of Sassanid catapult engineer corps, blinding hundreds of engineers and left the siege engine unused during the battle.

Rashidun archers were typically precise and power shooters, akin to Byzantine archers in the Battle of Callinicum. This powerful style allowed Rashidun archers to easily overcome Sassanid archers who preferred the rapid, showering Panjagan archery technique, as the former packed more punch and range than the latter during the Muslim conquest of Persia. Another particular case highlighted by Al-Baladhuri regarding account from a grandson of the survivor of Sassanid Army who witnessed the Battle of al-Qadisiyyah how the Sassanid arrows failed to pierce Rashidun armors or shields, while in return the arrows of Muslim archers able to penetrate mail coats and double cuirass of Sassanid warriors. The archers of Rashidun army also recorded for their accuracy, as they can aim the eyes of Sassanid horses with their arrows during Siege of Ctesiphon.

James Hardy theorized based on his quote from John Haldon and Romilly Jenkins, one of the decisive main factor for the Rashidun historical victory in battle of Yarmuk were due to their superb cavalry archers. While James Francis LePree, assistant professor for Medieval History at the City College of New York, wrote that the factor of "unquestionably great cavalry skill of the Arabs' horse archers" during the battle of Yarmuk.

==== Bows ====
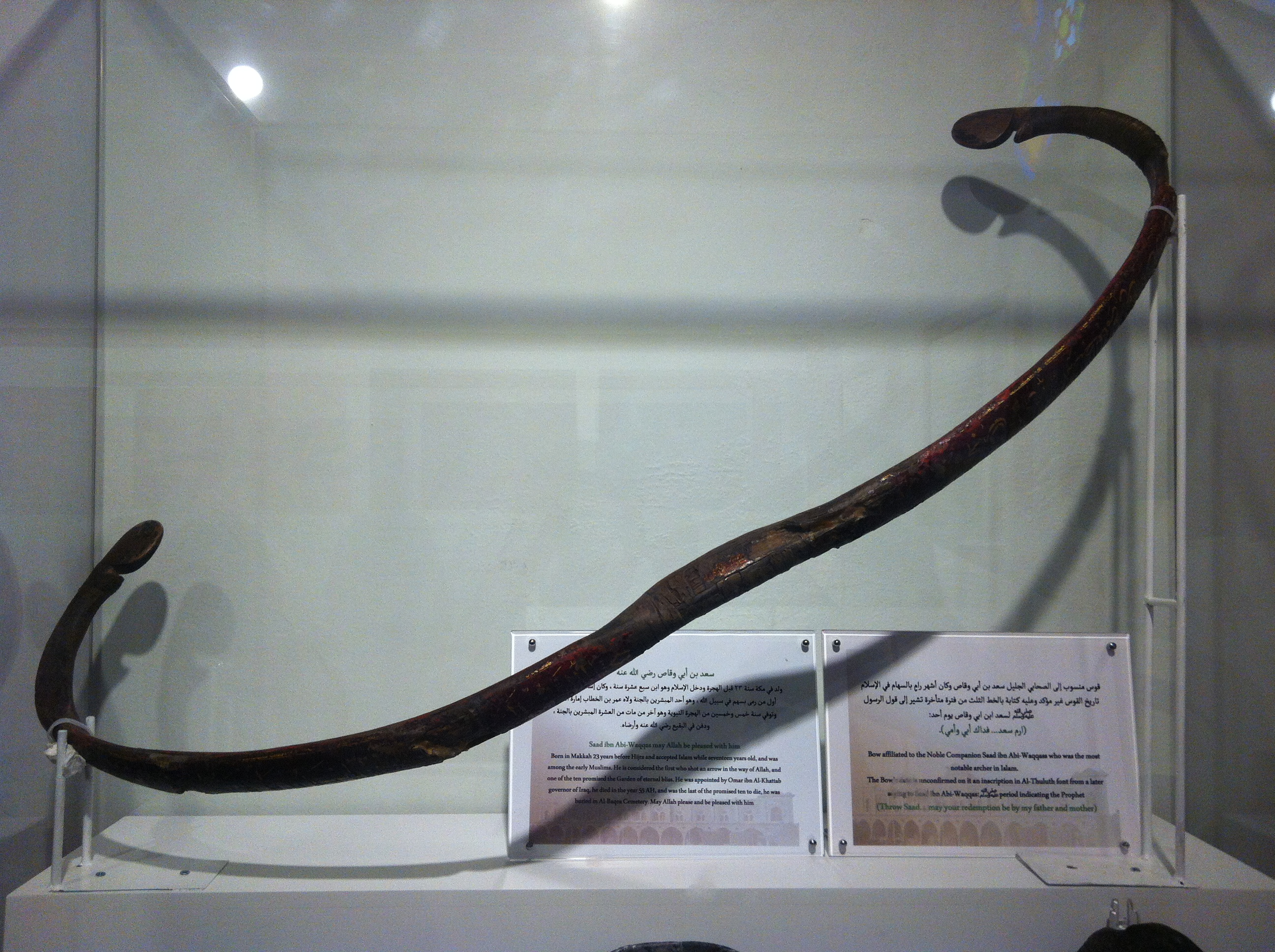
Bow of Sa'd ibn abi-Waqqas at Medina railway museum

According to an ancient arabic manuscript of archery, Bows used by people of Arabs were locally made in various parts of Arabia; the most typical were the Hijazi bows. There are three types of Hijazi bows:

- Qadib variant is basically made from single stave of wood
- Masnu'ah variant are composite bows designed from a stave or two staves divided lengthwise with four composite materials of wood, horn, glue, and sinew
- Mu'aqabbah variant are bows designed with horn of goats placed in the belly of the bow and sinew placed on the back of the bow.

Arabs were able to master the art of Bowery and use it so effectively to even matched the qualities of Byzantines and Persians made. The most famous place for manufacturing bows was Za s r in al-Sham. which became the name renowned Zed bows (al-Kanä t in al-Zas riyyah). The Muslims continued to improve the manufacturing of bows and were able at one point to manufacture sophisticated machines (al Ma'arrah, a large crossbow). According to Latham in his work, Saracen archery, Muslim archers of early era has two types of arrows. The first were shorter darts called Nabl and Nushshab, which were shot using either a crossbow or a bow equipped with arrow guide, while the second type were longer arrows which were shot with standard handbows. The maximum useful range of the traditional Arabian bow was about 150 meters.

=== Cavalry ===
Rashidun cavalry were highly regarded by the military rulers of early Medina, the theocracy and the Caliphates' successor states who gave the cavalry troopers got at least two portions of spoils and booty from the defeated enemies, while regular infantry only received only a single portion.

The core of the caliphate's mounted division was an elite unit which early Muslim historians named Tulai'a Mutaharrika (طليعة متحركة), or the mobile guard. Initially, the nucleus of the mobile guard was formed from veterans of the cavalry corps under Khalid during the conquest of Iraq. They consisted half of the forces brought by Khalid from Iraq to Syria 4.000 soldiers out of 8.000 soldiers. This shock cavalry division played important roles to the victories in Battle of Chains, Battle of Walaja, Battle of Ajnadayn, Battle of Firaz, Battle of Marj al-Dibaj, Siege of Damascus, Battle of the Yarmuk, Battle of Hazir and the Battle of the Iron Bridge against the Byzantine and the Sassanid. Later, the splinter of this cavalry division under Al-Qa'qa' ibn Amr al-Tamimi also involved in the Battle of al-Qadisiyyah, Battle of Jalula, and the Second siege of Emesa.

Modern historians and genealogists concluded that the stocks of early caliphate cavalry army that conquered from the western Maghreb of Africa, Spain to the east of Central Asia are drawn from the stock of fierce Bedouin pastoral nomads who take pride of their well-guarded mares genealogy, and called themselves the "People of the lance". (Note: "People of the lance" as quoted by Elizabeth E. Bacon)

==== Horse ====
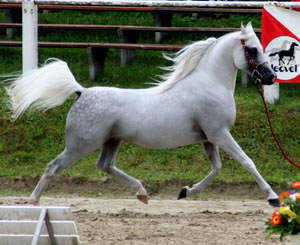
A purebred Arabian stallion, showing dished profile, arched neck, level croup and high-carried tail

Caliphate Arabian noble cavalry (Note: The nobility of the Nomad Arabs were based on tribal militaristic meritocracy and genealogical (both their own and their horses') supremacy, according to Elizabeth E. Bacon) mostly rode the legendary purebred Arabian horse, by fact the quality breeding of horses were held so dearly by the early caliphates who integrated traditions of Islam with their military practice. The phenomenal speed, stamina, animal cognition, along with very well documented pedigrees quality even for modern era standard, caused the Rashidun leaders to initiate a formal programs to distinguish them from inferior hybrids with unknown pedigrees including horses recently captured from the defeated Byzantines and Persians. Long withstanding periods of Arabian nomadic society closeness with the horses also contributed to fertility of equestrian masters which produced best class horse breed in Arabia. This breed are known as a hot-blooded breed that are known for their competitiveness. Mounts quality was monitored carefully since the beginning of the caliphate. Ibn Hisham recorded in his chronicle the earliest mention of such effort were after the Siege series of Khaybar fotresses the Muslims acquired massive booties of horses. In response Muhammad personally instructed the separation between purebred Arabian and the hybrid-class steeds.

This was practiced on a larger scale during the reign of caliph Umar. The caliph instructed Salman ibn Rabi'a to establish systematic military program to maintain the quality of caliphate mounts. Salman enlisted most of the steeds within realm of caliphate to undergo such steps:

1. Recording number and quality of horses available
2. Differences between the Arabian purebreed and the hybrid breeds was to be carefully noted.
3. Arabic structural Medical examination and Hippiatrica on each horses in regular basis including isolation and quarantine of sick horses
4. Regular training between horses and their masters to achieve the disciplined communication between them
5. Collective response training of the horses done in general routine
6. Individual response training of the horses on advanced level
7. Endurance and temperament training to perform in crowded and noisy place.

At the end of the program, both riders and horses obligated to enlisted in formal competition sponsored by Diwan al-Jund which consisted into two category:

1. Racing competition to measure the speed and stamina of each hybrids
2. Acrobat competition to measure the ability of the horses for difficult maneuvers during war.

Additionally, the already established cavalry divisions were obliged to undertook simulated combat operation raids during the winter and summer seasons, known as Tadrib al-Shawati wa al-Sawd'if, which were intended to maintain the quality of each cavalry forces, while also maintain the pressures towards the Byzantines, Persians, and other caliphate enemies while there is no major military campaign.

This profound tradition of breeding exaltation even became a basis for scholars of later era such as by Shafi'i jurist, Al-Mawardi, to establish the ruling of regular military share that the owner of noble purebreed Arabian (al‑khayl al‑ʿitāq) should be rewarded a share of booty three times of regular infantry soldiers, while owners of inferior mixed breeds received only twice infantry soldiers' share.

===== Training =====
The technical training method of each horsemen in this cavalry was recorded in al-Fann al-Harbi In- Sadr al-Islam and Tarikh Tabari:

1. Riding horses with saddles
2. Riding horses without saddles
3. Swordfighting without horses
4. Horse charging with stabbing weapons
5. Fighting with swords from the back of a moving horse
6. Archery
7. Mounted archery while the horse running
8. Close combat while changing their seat position on the back of moving horse, facing backwards

==== Equipment ====
Arabian caliphate cavalry wearing heavy armors as according to Eduard Alofs, contrary to the popular beliefs, the Arabian, both the Rashidun cavalry or the cavalry of Ghassanid and the Lakhmid kingdom were not lightly armored scout horsemen. In fact, classic chroniclers such as Al-Tabari, Procopius, and the Manual of Strategikon implied that the Arabian cavalry during the 5th century onwards were well armored heavy mounted troopers, Arabians usually covered their armors with dull-colored coats to prevent the sunburn on their metallic armor caused by hot climate of desert climate. Such Arabian knights were named Mujaffafa by early historians, which according to Martin Hinds were technically "Arabian Cataphracts" as they are fully armored both riders and horses".

The early caliphate armies generally neglected the use of stirrups despite long knowing of stirrups. al-Jahiz commented that the Arabs spurned double iron stirrups as it is viewed as a weakness, while also provided hindrance for skillful riders to maneuver during battles and can be a disadvantage if the rider falls but his legs are stuck in the stirrups.

Caliphate horsemen used the following weapons in battle:

- Mounted archery with flying gallop was practiced by the early caliphate regular Arab cavalry from Rashidun era onwards. Alof theorized "Mubarizun" elite division also used archery in close-combat duels for maximum arrow penetration against opponent armor.
- Caliphate horsemen also used thrown javelins as their weapon. Zubayr ibn al-Awwam, a seasoned Muhajir and early convert, who almost always brought horses during battle, is recorded to have killed his opponents at least in two occasions during his life. He killed Quraish nobleman Ubayda ibn Sa'id from Umayyad clan during the Battle of Badr, who was wearing a full set of armor and Aventail that protected his entire body and face. Zubayr hurled his javelin aiming at the unprotected eye of Ubayda and killed him immediately. The second occasion is during the Battle of Khaybar, Zubayr fought in a duel against a Jewish nobleman Yassir which Zubayr killed with a powerful javelin strike. Firsthand witnesses reported that Zubayr brandishing himself across the battlefield during the Battle of Hunayn while hung two javelins in his back.
- Early caliphate cavalry held their lance overhead posture with both hands.

==== Mubarizun ====
A select few apparatus of mounted soldiers who particularly skilled in duel using swords and various weapons were formed a commando unit called known as Mubarizuns.

Their main task was charging with their horses until they find the enemy generals or field officers, in order to kidnap or slay them in close combat, so the enemy will lose their commanding figure amidst of battle.

Historical reconstructors like Marcus Junkelmann has practiced in historical reenactment that mounted close combat specialists like Mubarizuns could fight effectively on top of their mounts even without stirrups. This is used by Alofs as an argument to debuff the majority historian beliefs that horsemen cannot fight effectively in close combat if they rode their horse without stirrups.

Aside from fighting with swords, lance, or mace, Mubarizuns also possessed a unique ability to use archery in close combat, where Alofs theorized that in mid range about five meters from the adversary, the duelists will exchange his lance with his bow and shoot the enemy from close range to achieve maximum penetration, while the duelist held the lance strapped between right leg and saddle.

==== Mahranite cavalry ====
Map of contemporary Yemen showing Al Mahrah Governorate from where Mahri tribes hailed.

Caliphate cavalry recruited from Al-Mahra tribe were known for their military prowess and skilled horsemen that often won battles with minimal or no casualties at all, which Amr ibn al As in his own words praised them as "peoples who kill without being killed". (Note: The derived narrations from Amr ibn al As seems original text from him which preserved by Ibn Abd al-Hakam chains of narrator source) Amr was amazed by these proud warriors for their ruthless fighting skill and efficiency During Muslim conquest where they spearheaded Muslim army during the Battle of Heliopolis, the Battle of Nikiou, and Siege Alexandria. Their commanders, Abd al-Salam ibn Hubayra al-Mahri were entrusted by Amr ibn al-As to lead the entire Muslim army during the Arab conquest of north Africa. Abd al-sallam defeated the Byzantine imperial army in Libya, and throughout these campaigns Al-Mahra were awarded much land in Africa as recognition of their bravery. When Amr established the town of Fustat, he further rewarded Al-Mahri members additional land in Fustat which then became known as Khittat Mahra or the Mahra quarter. This land was used by the Al-Mahra tribes as a garrison.

During the turmoil of Second Fitna, more than 600 Mahranites were sent to North Africa to fight Byzantines and the Berber revolts.

==== Kharijite rebels ====
The 8th-century chronicler Al-Jahiz noted the ferociousness of Kharijites horsemen, who spent parts of their early career in Kufa as Rashidun garrison troops during the Muslim conquest of Persia before their rebellion against the caliphate. Al-Jahiz pointed out Kharijites steeds' speed could not intercepted by most rival cavalrymen in the medieval era, save for the Turkish Mamluks. Notable seditionist warriors included Abd Allah ibn Wahb al-Rasibi from Bajila tribe, who participated in the early conquests of Persia under Sa'd ibn abi Waqqas.

Al-Jahiz also added that the Kharijites were feared for their cavalry charge with their lances which could break any defensive line, and almost never lose when pitted against an equal number of opponents. Dr. Adam Ali MA, PhD. postulated that Al-Jahiz assessment of the quality Kharijites quality are synonymous with the regular Arab cavalry as general in term of speed and charging maneuver. Their common ground with the caliphate military was even highlighted further by Professor Jeffrey Kenney, who said the early Kharijites existed in the time of Muhammad, in the form of figure named Dhu'l Khuwaisira at-Tamim, one of Banu Tamim chieftain who appeared after the Battle of Hunayn who protested the war spoils distribution. In fact, ʿAbd al-Malik ibn Ḥabīb, a jurist and historian in the 9th century described the Berber Kharijites as a mirror match which resembles the Arabic caliphate martial tradition, except the loyalty to authority.

Ibn Nujaym al-Hanafi, Hanafi scholar said about Kharijites: "... kharijites are a folk possessing strength and zealotry, who revolt against the government due to a self-styled interpretation. They believe that government is upon falsehood, disbelief or disobedience that necessitates it being fought against, and they declare lawful the blood and wealth of the Muslims...”.

=== Siege engineers ===
The Rashidun caliphate employed siege engines during their military campaigns.

==== Catapults ====
Catapults, called Manjaniq, were evident in the history of the early caliphates. There is a long history of the Muslim armies from the battle of Khaybar. Muhammad breached a Jewish fortress with catapults. Later on, Urwah ibn Masʽud and Ghaylan ibn Salamah also reportedly travelled to Jurash, near Abha in southwestern of Asir region in order to learn how to construct various Manjaniq catapults and Dabbabah siege ram as the city of Jurash were known for its siege workshops industry. Christides highlighted the high learning curves of the Arabs during the early caliphates that they could catch up with more established civilizations such as Byzantine in making complex war machines such as the Manjaniq catapult.

In the era of the caliphate, Catapults were used extensively in siege operations whenever the Muslim armies were expected to remain entrenched in one area for a long duration. Examples include Abu Ubayda and Khalid's besieged Damascus, and furious artillery bombardments by Amr ibn al-As during the second siege of Alexandria which immediately caused the Christian garrison to surrender. Another record of such siege engines operations came from Abdallah ibn Sa'd's attack on the capital of Makuria, where the catapult engine of Abdallah caused the main cathedral structure of Makuria to crumble, compelling King Qalidurut to agree to ratify a ceasefire agreement with the former. The forces of Sa'd ibn Abi Waqqas were also reported to able to quickly construct at least twenty siege engines during the Second siege of Babylon, despite their relatively short stints in the area after the battle of Qadisiyyah. According to an obscure record from Sebeos, Mu'awiyah's fleet which was led by Busr ibn Abi Artat is also reported to carry unspecified artillery engines that can throw "balls of Greek fire" within his ships during the siege of Constantinople.

==== Siege towers ====
Siege towers with scaling ladders are named al-Dabbdbah or al-dabr. These wooden towers moved on wheels and were several stories tall. They were driven up to the foot of the besieged fortification and then the walls were pierced with a battering ram. Archers guarded the ram and the soldiers who moved it.

==== Other engines ====
Regular Muslim infantries also qualified on the battlefield construction and engineering such as when they were able to perfect the art of building pontoon bridges which allowed them to gain the upper hand during the Battle of the Bridge. Their expertise on this field also helped during the last phase of the Siege of Damascus, when the Muslim army built water rafts and dinghies to cross the trench.

=== Irregular conscripts ===
During the Islamic conquest of Sassanid Persia (633-656), some 12,000 elite Persian soldiers converted to Islam and served later on during the invasion of the empire. During the Muslim conquest of Roman Syria (633-638), some 4,000 Greek Byzantine soldiers under their commander Joachim (later Abdullah Joachim) converted to Islam and served as regular troops in the conquest of both Anatolia and Egypt. During the conquest of Egypt (641-644), Coptic converts to Islam were recruited. During the conquest of North Africa, Berber converts to Islam were recruited as regular troops, who later made the bulk of the Rashidun army and later the Umayyad army in Africa.

==== Al-Abna' ====
Al-Abnāʾ was the descendants of Sasanian officers and soldiers of Persian and Daylam origins who intermarried with local Yemeni Arabs after they taken over Yemen from the Aksumite in the Aksumite–Persian wars. The Abnas had been garrisoned in Sanaa and their surrounding Their leaders converted to Islam and were active in the early Muslim conquests. They were gradually absorbed into the local population. They are considered siege-warfare experts. However, al-Jahiz outlined al-Abna lacked medieval era standard mobility.

Notable figures hailed from al-Abna was Fayruz al-Daylami, hero of caliphate who defended Yemen for a decade during Apostate wars, and Wahb ibn Munabbih, a prolific Rāwī of Hadith who later became a judge during the rule of caliph Umar ibn Abd al-Aziz.

==== Greeks ====
Some Greeks joined the caliphate army after they defected from Byzantine army. One example is Joachim, garrison commander of Aleppo, who defected along with his 4,000 garrison troops and fought loyally under the caliphate later.

==== Persian Asawir ====
As the conquest of Persia progressed, some Sassanid gentry converted into Islam and joined the Rashidun; these "Asawira"

Al-Jahiz outlined the quality of these Persians, which he identified as Khurasaniyyah, as powerful heavy cavalry with considerable frontal charge power, although they lacked speed. Al-Jahiz also claims the downside of the Persians was if their charge failed to break the enemy, they tended to give up fighting and were easily routed.

They continued service under the caliphate until Abd al-Rahman ibn Muhammad ibn al-Ash'ath's rebellion. This heavily armored cavalry crushed by regular Arab cavalry led by Al-Hajjaj ibn Yusuf which possess more skill and discipline in Battle of Dayr al-Jamajim. As Hawting highlighted the different performance between caliphate cavalry and those of Abd al-Rahman al-Ash'ath's army including those of Persian Asawir, that "between the discipline and organisation of the Umayyads and their largely Syrian support and the lack of these qualities among their opponents in spite of, or perhaps rather because of, the more righteous and religious flavour of the opposition" is a recurring pattern in the civil wars of the period.

==== Jats ====
As the territory of caliphate has reached Sindh, there were reports that the local Jats had converted to Islam and even entered the military service. A notable local named Ziyad al-Hindi recorded has been entered the service under caliph Ali.

==== Arabic Christian levy ====
Chronicler Faraj recorded in his Fann 'Idarat al-Ma'arakah fi al-Islam that for certain situations, caliph Umar allowed a distinct unit which had not yet embraced Islam to be enlisted for military service. Prior to the Battle of Buwaib, Umar allowed al-Muthanna ibn Haritha to recruit Arab members of Banu Taghlib and Banu Nimr who had not yet embraced Islam for his service.

=== Field medics ===
Since the time of Muhammad, field medic roles were usually filled by wives or female relatives of the soldiers while during the period of Umar he extensively improved this role by changing it to make sure that every force being sent there had a team of medics, judges, and translators.

== Camels ==
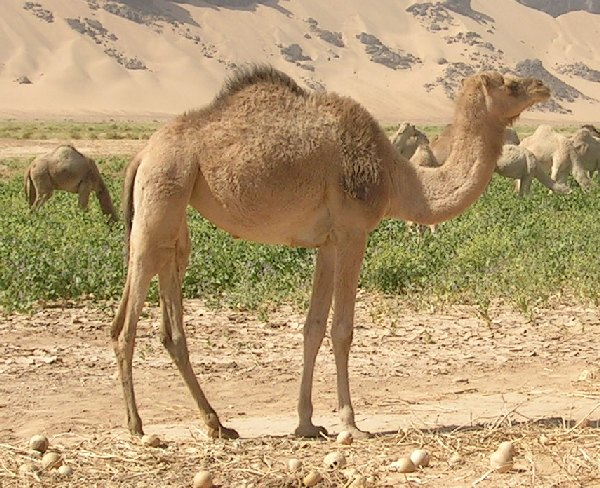
Arabian camel (dromedary) has a long, curved neck, single hump and hairy throat, shoulders and hump

The Rashidun caliphate employed camels in various military roles since they respected the beasts' legendary endurance and were more numerous than horses in the Middle East, especially in dry areas. Extensive use of camels occurred during the initial campaigns of Muhammad, which continued onwards the existence of Rashidun caliphate and it successor states. The abundant availability of camel herds within caliphate enabled even infantries also mounted with camels during the caliphate military campaigns.

Al-Baghawi recorded an example that found from long narration of tradition, that a wealthy Arab soldier like Dirar ibn al-Azwar possessed 1,000 camels even before converting to Islam. (Note: Baghawi transmit the long narrative chains which came from Dhiraar himself which recorded by Al-Tabarani. However Ibn Hajar al-Asqalani rejected the authenticity of the dialogue contained in the narration, although he did not criticize regarding the case that Dhiraar's possession of thousand camels which came in the background of the dialogue narration.)

Furthermore, the development of Diwan al-Jund by caliph Umar ensured each caliphate soldiers possessed camels, despite their difficult tempers and expensive price. Both the camel riders and infantry of the Caliphate armies are known to have ridden camels during long-march campaigns.

Historians have generally agreed that the early caliphate's rapid conquests were facilitated by their large-scale utilization of dromedaries.

Rashidun army camels also bore offspring while marching to the battle. Al-Tabari, a firsthand witness of Rashidun vanguard commander Aqra' ibn Habis, recorded that before the Battle of Anbar, the camels belonging to his soldiers were about to gave birth. However, since the Aqra' would not halt the operation, he instructed his soldiers to carry the newborn camels on the rumps of adult camels.

=== War-camel breeding ===
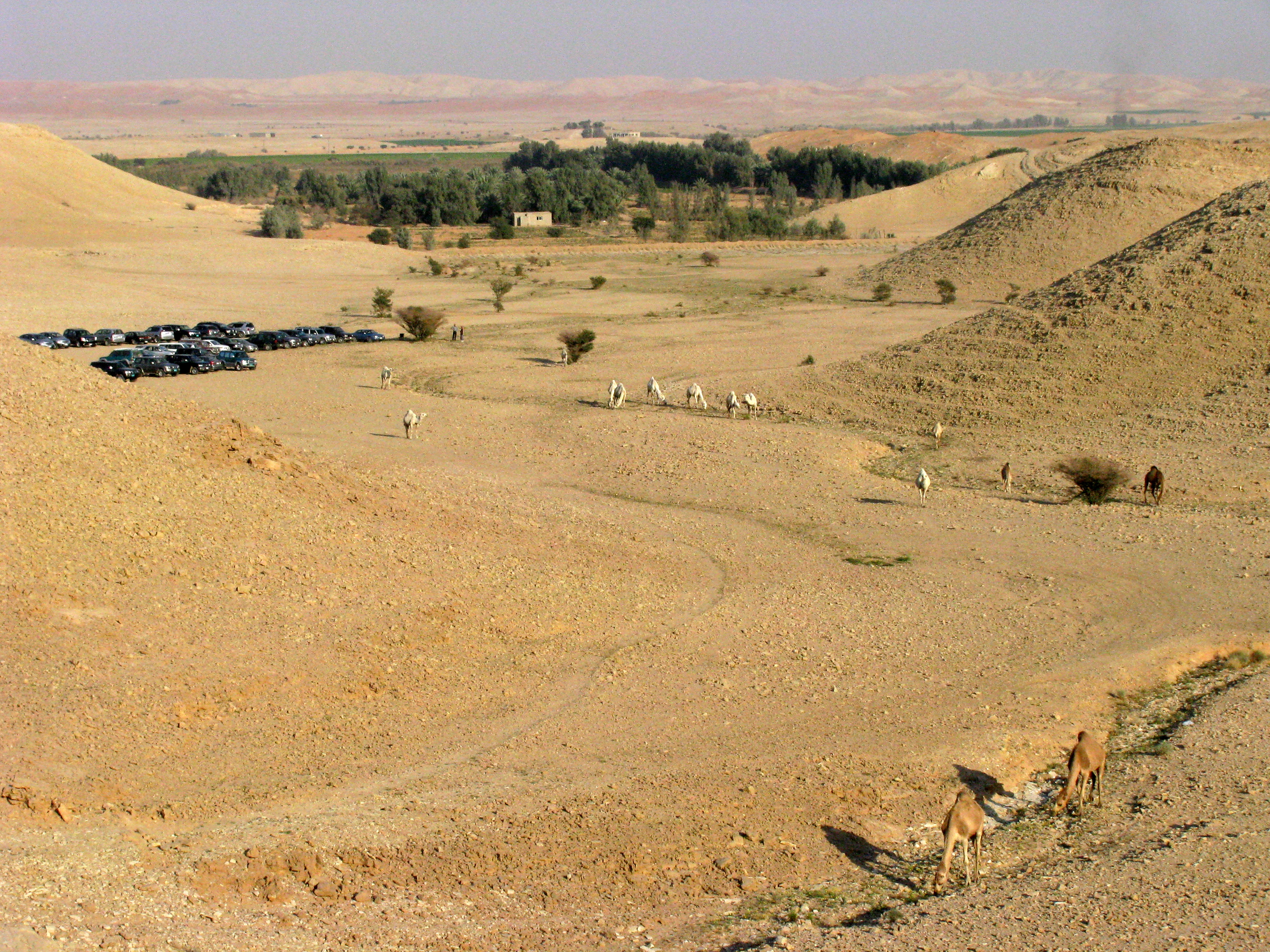
Arabian Camel herd grazing near the Riyadh River, southeast Diriyah

According to classical Muslim sources, caliph Umar acquired some fertile land in Arabia which were deemed fit for large-scale camel breeding to be established as Hima, government-reserved land property used as pasture to raise camels that were being prepared to be sent to the front line for Jihad conquests.

Early sources recorded that the Hima of Rabadha and Diriyah produced 4,000 war camels annually during the reign of Umar, while during the reign of Uthman, both Hima lands further expanded until al-Rabadha Hima alone could produce 4,000 war camels.

At the time of Uthman death, there were said to be around 1,000 war camels already prepared in al-Rabadhah.

Modern Islamic studies researchers theorized institution of Hima by caliph Umar, was inspired by the earliest Hima established in Medina during the time of Muhammad. Muhammad himself instructed that some of private property at the outskirts of Medina was transformed into Hima. Another reason the caliph Umar moved Hima from Medina was the increasing military demand for camels for which the lands near Medina no longer sufficed.

=== Use in combat ===
David Nicolle also mentioned the use of distinct camel cavalry during the battle of Qadisiyyah. It is known that horses can be scared by the stench of camels.

Caliphate archers rode camels inside or outside battle, and only dismounted when they were taking position to shoot volleys.

==== Camel defensive lines ====
According to John Walter Jandora in his Yarmuk reconstruction study, for the open-battle scenario, the abundance of camels brought by the army during their campaigns were used to form a line of camels positioned on the rear of Muslim battle lines, between the infantry lines and the camp perimeter which were positioned behind them, where reserve troops (al-Saqah), supplies and camp followers were located. Jandora argued it is used as a fail-safe, in case of breaches by enemy cavalry charges, which act as a deterrent that even stopped the powerful charge of the Byzantine Cataphract due to the beasts' large frames and foul tempers.

==== Mahranite camelier corps ====
Amr ibn al-As led a ruthless cavalry corps from tribes of Al-Mahra who were famous for their "invincible battle skills on top of their mounts", during the conquests of Egypt and north Africa (Note: The derived narrations from Amr ibn al As were attributed to the traditions of Ibn Abd al-Hakam chains of narrators). Al-Mahra tribes were experts in camelry and famed for their high-class Mehri camel breed which were renowned for their speed, agility and toughness.

==== Camel corpse bridge in al-Anbar ====
During the Battle of al-Anbar, Khalid instructed his soldiers to slaughter many sickly camels and throw them into the trench dug by the Persian defenders in front of the wall of Anbar fortress. The heap of dead camels served as a bridge for Khalid cavalry to cross the trench and breach the fortress. (Note: Salabi and Blankinship Notes from primary sources)

=== Use for transport and logistics ===
Similar to the infantry, the archer corps of the Rashidun caliphate were mounted during their movements during their marches. The stamina and strength of camels along with their abundant availability across the caliphate realm by the army enabled their famous fast mass mobilization. Even the horsemen preferred riding camels during a march as they wanted to save their steed's energy for battles and raids.

=== Use as emergency rations ===
Desperate caravaners are known to have consumed camels' urine and to have slaughtered them when their resources were exhausted.

==== Khalid's legendary camels' desert crossing ====
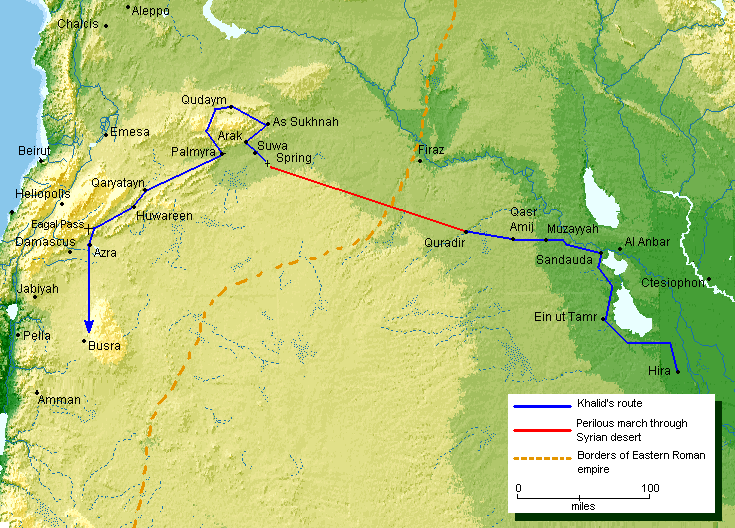
A map showing one of a series of possible itineraries of Khalid's march to Syria from Iraq

Around 634, after the clash at the Battle of Firaz against intercepting Byzantine forces, caliph Abu Bakr immediately instructed Khalid to reinforce the contingents of Abu Ubayda, Amr ibn al-As, and Yazid ibn Abi Sufyan which started to invade Syria. Khalid immediately started his nearly impossible journey with his elite forces after leaving Muthanna ibn Haritha as his deputy in Iraq and instructed his soldiers to make each camel drink as much as possible before they started the six-day nonstop march without resupply. (Note: Professor Ross Burns stated in his book, Damascus, A History, that the arduous march of Khalid from Iraq to Syria lasted eighteen days, not six days, as the other historians mentioned.) In the end, Khalid managed to reach Suwa spring and immediately defeated the Byzantine garrison in Arak, Syria, who were surprised by Khalid's force's sudden emergence from the desert.

According to Hugh Kennedy, historians across the ages assessed this daring journey with various expressions of amazement. Classical Muslim historians praised the marching force's perseverance as a miracle and work of god, while most western modern historians regard this as solely the genius of Khalid. It is Khalid, whose, in Hugh Kennedy's opinion, imaginative thinking effected this legendary feat. The historian Moshe Gil calls the march "a feat which has no parallel" and a testament to "Khalid's qualities as an outstanding commander"., while Laura Veccia Vaglieri and Patricia Crone dismissed the adventure of Khalid as never having happened as they thought it logically impossible. Nevertheless, military historian Richard G. Davis explained that Khalid imaginatively employed camel supply trains to make this journey possible. Those well hydrated camels that accompanied his journey were proven before in the Battle of Ullais for such a risky journey. Khalid resorted to slaughtering many camels for provisions for his desperate army.

== Strategy and tactics ==
=== Field formation ===
When the army was on the march, it always halted on Fridays. When on march, the day's march was never allowed to be so long as to exhaust the troops. The stages were selected with reference to the availability of water and other provisions. The advance was led by an advance guard consisting of a regiment or more. Then came the main body of the army, and this was followed by the women and children and the baggage loaded on camels. At the end of the column moved the rear guard. On long marches the horses were led; but if there was any danger of enemy interference on the march, the horses were mounted, and the cavalry thus formed would act either as the advance guard or the rear guard or move wide on a flank, depending on the direction from which the greatest danger loomed.

When on march the army was divided into:

- Muqaddima (مقدمة) - "the vanguard"
- Qalb (قلب) - "the center"
- Al-khalf (الخلف) - "the rear"
- Al-mu'akhira (المؤخرة) - "the rear guard".

=== Divisions in battle ===
The army was organized on the decimal system.

On the battlefield the army was divided into sections. These sections were:

- Qalb (قلب) - the center
- Maymana (ميمنه) - the right wing
- Maysara (ميسرة) - the left wing

Each section was under a commander and was at a distance of about 150 meters from the others. Every tribal unit had its leader called an arif. In such units, there were commanders for each 10, 100 and 1,000 men, the latter-most corresponding to regiments. The grouping of regiments to form larger forces was flexible, varying with the situation. Arifs were grouped and each group was under a commander called amir al-ashar and amir al-ashars were under the command of a section commander, who were under the command of the commander in chief, amir al-jaysh.

Other components of the army were:

- Rijal (رجال) - infantry
- Fursan (فرسان) - cavalry
- Rumat (رماة) - archers
- Tali'ah (طليعة) - patrols, who monitored enemy movements
1. 'Rukban (ركبان) - camel corps
2. 'Nuhhab al-mu'an (نهّاب المؤن) - foraging parties, Rukban (ركبان)

=== Cavalry ===
The general strategy of early Muslim cavalry was to utilize their speed to outpace their adversaries. Muslim generals such as Khalid ibn Walid and Sa'd ibn Abi Waqqas are known to have employed this advantage against both the Sassanid army and the Byzantine army as the main drawback of the armies of Sassanid Persian Empire and the Eastern Roman Empire was their lack of mobility.

Another remarkable strategy developed by Al-Muthanna and later followed by other Muslim generals was not moving far from the desert so long as there were opposing forces within striking distance of its rear. The idea was to fight the battles close to the desert, with safe escape routes open in case of defeat.

==== Cavalry usage during siege warfare ====
The tactics used by Iyad in his Mesopotamian campaign were similar to those employed by the Muslims in Palestine, though in Iyad's case the contemporary accounts reveal his specific modus operandi, particularly in Raqqa. The operation to capture that city entailed positioning cavalry forces near its entrances, preventing its defenders and residents from leaving or rural refugees from entering. Concurrently, the remainder of Iyad's forces cleared the surrounding countryside of supplies and took captives. These dual tactics were employed in several other cities in al-Jazira. They proved effective in gaining surrenders from targeted cities running low on supplies and whose satellite villages were trapped by hostile troops.

Ubadah ibn al-Samit, another Rashidun commander, is also recorded to have developed his own distinct strategy which involved the use of cavalry during siege warfare. During a siege, Ubadah would dig a large hole, deep enough to hide a considerable number of horsemen near an enemy garrison, and hid his cavalry there during the night. When the sun rose and the enemy city opened their gates for the civilians in the morning, Ubadah and his hidden cavalry then emerged from the hole and stormed the gates as the unsuspecting enemy could not close the gate before Ubadah's horsemen entered. This strategy was used by Ubadah during the Siege of Laodicea and Siege of Alexandria.

=== Intelligence and espionage ===
It was one of the most highly developed departments of the army which proved helpful in most of the campaigns. The espionage (جاسوسية) and intelligence services were first organised by Muslim general Khalid ibn Walid during his campaign to Iraq. Later, when he was transferred to the Syrian front, he organized the espionage department there as well. As the term of military rulings during Rashidun caliphate were intertwined with Sharia ruling, the concept of espionage also became subject in jurisprudential term, as in the modern era, Islamic official committee of Saudi Arabia Scholars also used the practice of Zubayr as one of their source of fatawa, such as an act of government to spying any endangering act from enemy of the state, such as criminal behavior, alleged terrorism, and other illegal conduct, were allowed in Islam jurisprudence. The committee based this ruling of espionage by legitimate government from the act of Zubayr for spying Banu Qurayza for their alleged betrayal during the Battle of the Trench on the instruction of Muhammad.

=== Border raids and expansions ===
During the tenure of Khalid ibn al-Walid in the Muslim conquest of Iraq, he formed Ummal, military units that act as his deputy personnel to govern, watch, and collect Kharaj and Jizya in the occupied areas, or as raiding parties in uncaptured cities or settlements. At one time, Khalid appointed Dirar ibn al-Azwar, Al-Qa'qa' ibn Amr al-Tamimi, Dirar ibn al-Khattab, al-Muthanna ibn Haritha, Dirar ibn Muqrin, and Busr ibn Abi Ruhm as Ummal raiding force to raid Sib, a district located near the city of Qasr ibn Hubayrah and north of Hillah. These raiding detachment forces made repeated, casual raids until it was subdued.

== Military organizations within the state department ==
=== Military governorship ===
The caliphs of Rashidun founded an administrative body which was based on military governorship, known as Jund. Jund were garrisoned in a capital which became the military headquarters named Amsar. Border military posts' fortifications of Jund were also established and named Ribat.

Al-Baladhuri estimates that around 636 AD, the number of caliphate regular soldiers in Basra totalled 80.000. (Note: According to Al-Baladhuri, Muqatila were caliphate troops who received payment, pension, and enrolled in Diwan as members of the regular army.)

==== Diwan al-Jund ====
Caliph Umar was the first ruler to organize the army state department in the name of Diwan al-Jund to oversee the needs of soldiers regarding equipment. This reform was introduced in 637 AD. A beginning was made with the Quraish and the Ansars and the system was gradually extended to the whole of Arabia and to Muslims of conquered lands. All adults who could be called to war were prepared, and a scale of salaries was fixed. All registered men were liable for military service. They were divided into two categories, namely:

1. Regular soldiers
2. Muslim civilians who could be enlisted for the compulsory call of Jihad in case of state emergency.

The pay was given in the beginning of the month of Muharram.

The armies of the Caliphs were mostly paid in cash salaries. In contrast to many post-Roman polities in Europe, grants of land, or rights to collect taxes directly from the people within one's grant of land, were of only minor importance. A major consequence of this was that the army directly depended on the state for its subsistence which, in turn, meant that the military had to control the state apparatus.

=== Capital guard ===
Before the caliphate, the Caliphal guards or Haras and Shurta were volunteers yet consistent practice where at most around fifty persons were enlisted to guard Muhammad wherever he went. In Muhammad's era they were usually those early Companions generally known for martial prowess such as Talhah ibn Ubaydillah, Sa'd ibn Mu'adh, Zubayr ibn al-Awwam, Sa'd ibn Ubadah, Muhammad ibn Maslamah, Sa'd ibn Abi Waqqas, Abu Ayyub al Ansari, Usayd ibn Hudayr, Miqdad ibn Aswad and others. However, these units were disbanded after the Asbabun Nuzul during the Raid on Dhu Amarr.^{[Quran 5:11]}

==== Roles within caliphate ====
Although they seem similar and interchangeable in duty, Haras and Shurta were different. Shurta mainly guarded and policed important state sites, such as Masjid Nabawi Caliphate citadel, the capital district of the Emirate governor, or Sultanate palaces, while also patrolling around the city to maintain law and punish any violations. Meanwhile, Haras served as bodyguards, whether to Muhammad himself, Caliphs, Sultans, Governors, or Amirs.

They were also tasked to assist the regular forces in battle to repel enemy advances toward the capital. This role was recorded by Ibn Kathir after the rebellion break out across Arabia after the death of Muhammad, Abu Bakr immediately revived the organised elite guard unit al-Ḥaras wa al-Shurṭa, which had earlier been disbanded by Muhammad after the Raid on Dhu Amarr. Abu Bakr raised these units again to defend Medina as a massive coalition of tribes had gathered around Medina while the main army of Medina had accompanied Usama ibn Zayd to conquer the border of northern Arabia and Jordan. Veteran companions such as Ali ibn Abi Talib, Talha ibn Ubayd Allah, Abd al-Rahman ibn Awf, Abd Allah ibn Mas'ud and Zubayr ibn al-Awwam were appointed as commanders of these units before the battle. This unit defeated the huge rebel tribes gathering during the defense of Medina, by only using transport camels as mounts, since warhorses and trained camels were brought by the main army led by Usama, who was still fighting the Ghassanid in the north.

After Abu Bakr, Haras and Shurta practice of retinual bodyguards seems absent or minimal during the reign of Umar, Uthman, Ali, and Hasan. However, after Mu'awiya I's ascension he revived this practice drastically after the bloody ends of Umar, Uthman, Ali, and Hasan ibn Ali. Haras and Shurta broadened the role to not only guard caliph, but also Amirs or military governors which continued onwards of successive caliphates, both Umayyad and Abbasid, and their localized successor states. According to the tradition of Imam Suyuti, the first person to implement Shurta police forces on the governor level was Amr ibn al-'As.

==== Strength ====
Shurta bodyguard numbers varied from around 30-50 at the time of Muhammad, or 500-600 at the time of Mu'awiyah. For Umayyad governors such as Khalid al-Qasri even possessed 4,000 members or higher for later era which practically became private armies of each governor.

==== Equipment ====
Shurta during Umayyad usually patrolled on horseback. Al-Hajjaj ibn Yusuf prescribed that Shurta members must ride the best horses and forbade Shurta to ride inferior animals such as mules. The Shurta often wore heavy armor of Mujaffafa (scale armor) during their duty.

According to various early Muslim historians, aside from protecting the sovereign and capital, the Haras unit also acted as security police to maintain the safety of the city where they were assigned. During Umayyad rule they were armed with javelin-sized short spears called Hirba, a mace, along with whips and chains as disciplining weapon. They also usually carried Sayf long swords in order to immediately executes someone on the order of their superiors. The Shurta during the Umayyad period also carried a weapon called Kafr Kubat, a slingshot-type weapon

== Conduct and ethics ==
The basic principle in the Qur'an for fighting is that other communities should be treated as one's own. Fighting is justified for legitimate self-defense, to aid other Muslims and after a violation of the terms of a treaty, but should be stopped if these circumstances cease to exist. During his life, Muhammad gave various injunctions to his forces and adopted practices toward the conduct of war. The most important of these were summarized by Muhammad's companion, Abu Bakr, in the form of ten rules for the Rashidun army:

Stop, O people, that I may give you ten rules for your guidance in the battlefield. Do not commit treachery or deviate from the right path. You must not mutilate dead bodies. Neither kill a child, nor a woman, nor an aged man. Bring no harm to the trees, nor burn them with fire, especially those which are fruitful. Slay not any of the enemy's flock, save for your food. You are likely to pass by people who have devoted their lives to monastic services; leave them alone.

These injunctions were honored by the second caliph, Umar, during whose reign (634–644) important Muslim conquests took place. In addition, during the Battle of Siffin, the caliph Ali stated that Islam does not permit Muslims to stop the supply of water to their enemy. In addition to the Rashidun Caliphs, hadiths attributed to Muhammad himself suggest that he stated the following regarding the Muslim conquest of Egypt:

"You are going to enter Egypt, a land where qirat (a money unit) is used. Be extremely good to them as they have with us close ties and marriage relationships."

"Be Righteous to Allah about the Copts."

The caliphate army also emphasised discipline. The fourth caliph, Ali, put an emphasis on the discipline of archers and cavalry, as he disliked unnecessary talks and noisiness during the motion of battle.

The major compendium codex of Shafiite scholars ruling, Kitab al-Umm, has mentioned regarding the duels of Zubayr, Ali, and Muhammad ibn Maslamah against Jewish champions during the siege of Khaybar fortresses as part of Taharruf, or military deception chapter based on Islamic law.

== See also ==
- Arab conquest of Armenia
- Byzantine-Arab Wars
- Fall of Sassanids
- Islamic conquest of Afghanistan
- Islamic conquest of Persia
- Mobile guard
- Muslim conquests
- Muslim conquest in the Indian subcontinent
- Muslim conquest of Egypt
- Muslim conquest of Syria
- Rashidun caliphs
- Rashidun Caliphate

== Sources ==
=== Primary sources ===
- Recorded traditional oral narration of historical events during the early time of Islam of Urwah ibn Zubayr, an historian during Rashidun era.
- Earliest records of Maghazi (historical records regarding Islamic conquests) of Muhammad by Tabi'in historian Aban ibn Uthman
- Recorded narrations of Maghazi classifications by Ibn Shihab al-Zuhri
- historical manuscript compilations about Hima (war-camel breeding grounds) (3rd AH) authored by Abu Ali al-Hajari
- Mu'jam M Ista'jam (5th AH), an early caliphate history about war camel breeding authored by Abu Ubaid al-Bakri
- Wafa' al-Wafa' bi Akhbar Dar al-Mustafa (6th AH), an early caliphate historical manuscript mentioning Hima breeding grounds Al-Samhudi
- Musnad Ahmad ibn Hanbal, which contains many scarces of historical account regarding military activity during the time of Muhammad and four righteous guided caliphate
- Sahih Bukhari Chapter 57: Book of Jihad, regarding ethics and basics of warfare according to Islamic tradition
- Sahih Muslim Chapter 19: KITAB AL-JIHAD WA'L-SIYAR (The Book of Jihad And Expedition), regarding ethics and conduct during wartime
- Bulugh al-Maram Chapter 10. The book of Jihad. treatise regarding basis of military conducts and treatise attributed to Shafiʽite scholar Ibn Hajar al-Asqalani.
- Sīrat Rasūl Allāh (Biography of the prophet of Allah) by Ibn Hisham
- Masabih al-Sunnah contained narrations of the peoples who lived during the Rashidun conquests, including those directly involved in the conquest. Authored by Al-Baghawi
- Al-Sirah al-Nabawiyyah (The Life of the Prophet), an edited recension by Ibn Isḥāq
- History of the Prophets and Kings (Arabic: تاريخ الرسل والملوك Tārīkh al-Rusul wa al-Mulūk), more commonly known as Tarikh al-Tabari (تاريخ الطبري) or Tarikh-i Tabari or The History of al-Tabari (Persian: تاریخ طبری)
- Historical excerpts from Abu Bakr al-Zubaydi, scholar and historian from the Caliphate of Córdoba
- Kitāb al-Furūsiyya wa 'l-Bayṭara ("Book of Horsemanship and Hippiatry"), regarding horsemanship and proficiency in handling all types of weapons, and bravery, by Ibn Akhī Ḥizām (ابن أخي حزام)
- Al-Furūsiyya (Equestrian martial exercise) of four basic principles of horsemanship, archery, cavalry charging, and swordsmanship, authored by Ibn Qayyim al-Jawziyya
- Futuh al-Buldan, The Conquest of (the) countries, a work regarding early Islamic conquest 9th century historian Ahmad Ibn Yahya al-Baladhuri of Abbasid-era Baghdad
- Futūḥ mișr wa akhbārahā (Arabic: فتح مصر و أخبارها, Conquest of Egypt and some account of it, i.e. of the country) authored by Ibn Abd al-Hakam
- Kitāb al-Furūsiyya wa-al-Bayṭarah, regarding military tactics around cavalry, Hippiatry, and archery warfare
- Kitab al-Tarikh wa al-Maghazi (Arabic: كتاب التاريخ والمغازي, "Book of History and Campaigns") by al-Waqidi
- Kitāb aṭ-Tabaqāt al-Kabīr (transl. The Book of the Major Classes), eight-volume work contains the lives of Muhammad, his Companions and Helpers, including those who fought at the Battle of Badr as a special class, and of the following generation, the Followers, who received their traditions from the Companions, authored by Ibn Sa'd
- Usd al-ghabah fi marifat al-Saḥabah (The Lions of the Forest and the knowledge about the Companions), biographies of Muhammad and 7,554 of his companions, by Ali ibn al-Athir
- The Strategikon, a military handbook of the late 6th century, attributed to the Emperor Maurice
- Social commentary regarding military and social developments during the times of caliphates found in the books of Al-Jahiz
- Arab archery, a translated classical treatise of traditional Arabic archery written by an unknown author
- A History of Heraclius, historical accounts regarding the events of the mid- to late 7th century with full biblical allegory, written by Sebeos

=== Secondary sources ===
- Abdul-jabbar, Suhaib (2013). The predicate objective of the combined ten books - Comprehensive (Arabic ed.). modern comprehensive library. p. 370.
- Adil, Hajjah Amina (2002). Muhammad, the Messenger of Islam: His Life & Prophecy. ISCA. ISBN 9781930409118.
- Akram, Agha Ibrahim (2006). The Sword of Allah Khalid Bin Al-Waleed, His Life and Campaigns. Mr. Books. pp. 359–417.
- al-Mubarak, Malik Abdulazeez (1997). Warfare in early Islam (PhD). University of Glasgow. p. 18.
- Al-Rashid, Saad A. (1978). "Lights on the History and Archaeology of Al-Rabadhah (Locally Called Abu Salim)". Proceedings of the Seminar for Arabian Studies. 9: 88–101. JSTOR 41223222.
- Alexander, David (2001). Swords and Sabers during the Early Islamic Period. Gladius XXI. p. 200.
- 'Ali, Abdul (2018). The Image of Mahatma Gandhi in Modern Arabic Literature (English ed.). Educreation Publishing.
- Ali, Maulana Muhammad (2015). The Early Caliphate. Ahmadiyya Anjuman Ishaat Islam Lahore USA. ISBN 9781934271254.
- Ali, Adam (2018). "The Turks: The Medieval World's Most Martial People". Medievalists.net. Medievalists.
- Alofs, Eduard (2014). "Studies on Mounted Warfare in Asia I: Continuity and Change in Middle Eastern Warfare, c. CE 550-1350 — What Happened to the Horse Archer?". War in History. 22 (1): 423–444. doi:10.1177/0968344513517664. JSTOR 26098617. S2CID 163010878.
- Alofs, Eduard (2015). "Studies on Mounted Warfare in Asia II: The Iranian Tradition — The Armoured Horse Archer in the Middle East, c. CE 550–1350". War in History. 22 (1): 18–24. JSTOR 26098221.
- Archer, Rosemary (1992). The Arabian Horse. Allen Breed Series. London: J. A. Allen. ISBN 978-0-85131-549-2.
- Archer, Rosemary; Pearson, Colin; Covey, Cecil (1978). The Crabbet Arabian Stud: Its History and Influence. Northleach. Gloucestershire: Alexander Heriot & Co. Ltd. ISBN 978-0-906382-00-4.
- Bacon, Elizabeth E. (1954). "Types of Pastoral Nomadism in Central and Southwest Asia". Southwestern Journal of Anthropology. 10 (1): 44–68. doi:10.1086/soutjanth.10.1.3629075. JSTOR 3629075. S2CID 155878499.
- Baladhuri, Ahmad ibn Yahya ibn Jabir (March 2011). The Origins of the Islamic State: Being a Translation from the Arabic Accompanied With Annotations, Geographic and Historic Notes of the Kitab Futuh Al-buldan. Cosimo, Inc. ISBN 9781616405342.
- Bennett, Deb. (1998). Conquerors: The Roots of New World Horsemanship (1st ed.). Lincoln: Amigo Publications Inc. ISBN 978-0-9658533-0-9.
- Bosworth, C. E. (1983). "Abnāʾ". Encyclopaedia Iranica, Vol. I, Fasc. 3. pp. 226–228.
- Bosworth, C. E. (1987). "ASĀWERA". Encyclopaedia Iranica, Vol. II, Fasc. 7. pp. 706–707.
- Brill, E.J (1993). E.J. Brill's First Encyclopaedia of Islam: 1913-1936. Ṭāʻif - Zūrkhāna, Volume 8. Brill Publishers. ISBN 9004097945.
- Burhanuddin, Anas (2013). "Bolehkah Memata-Matai Suami?" [Is it allowed to spying on husband?]. Almanhaj (in Indonesian). Indonesia; Java Island; Purwodadi: Lajnah Istiqomah Surakarta.
- Burns, Ross (2007) [2005]. Damascus: A History. Routledge. ISBN 978-1-134-48849-0.
- "Cameliers and camels at war". New Zealand History online. History Group of the New Zealand Ministry for Culture and Heritage. 30 August 2009. Archived from the original on 16 March 2012.
- Christides, Vasilios (1988). "Naval History and Naval Technology in Medieval Times the Need for Interdisciplinary Studies". Byzantion. 58 (2): 309–332. JSTOR 44171055.
- Clarke, Nicola (2013). "'They are the most treacherous of people': religious difference in Arabic accounts of three early medieval Berber revolts" (PDF). EHumanista. 24: 510–525.
- Coetzee, Daniel; Eysturlid, Lee W. (2013). Philosophers of War: The Evolution of History's Greatest Military Thinkers [2 Volumes] The Evolution of History's Greatest Military Thinkers (PDF). ABC-CLIO. ISBN 9780313070334.
- Crone, P. (1978). "Khālid b. al-Walīd". In van Donzel, E.; Lewis, B.; Pellat, Ch. & Bosworth, C. E. (eds.). The Encyclopaedia of Islam, Second Edition. Volume IV: Iran–Kha. Leiden: E. J. Brill. pp. 928–929. ISBN 978-90-04-05745-6. OCLC 758278456.
- Davis, Richard G. (2010). U.S. Army and Irregular Warfare 1775-2007: Selected Papers From the 2007 Conference of Army Historians: Selected Papers From the 2007 Conference of Army Historians. Government Printing Office. p. 23. ISBN 978-0160867309.
- Donner, Fred M. (1981). The Early Islamic Conquests. Princeton: Princeton University Press. ISBN 0-691-05327-8.
- Faris, Nabih Amnin; Elmer, Robert Potter (2019). Arab archery. David De Angelis. pp. 4–5. ISBN 9788834138182.
- Ghadanfar, Mahmood Ahmad; Al-Khaiat, Abdul-Latif (2001). The Commanders of Muslim Army. Darussalam Publishers. p. 392.
- Gil, Moshe (1997) [1992]. A History of Palestine, 634–1099. Translated by Ethel Broido (Revised ed.). Cambridge and New York: Cambridge University Press. ISBN 0-521-40437-1.
- Greene, Joseph A.; Stager, Lawrence E.; Coogan, Michael D. (2018). The Archaeology of Jordan and Beyond Essays in Memory of James A. Sauer. Brill. ISBN 9789004369801.
- Hawting, G. R. (2000). The First Dynasty of Islam: The Umayyad Caliphate AD 661–750 (2nd ed.). London and New York: Routledge. pp. 68–69. ISBN 0-415-24072-7.
- Hillenbrand, Carole, ed. (1989). The History of al-Ṭabarī, Volume XXVI: The Waning of the Umayyad Caliphate: Prelude to Revolution, A.D. 738–744/A.H. 121–126. SUNY Series in Near Eastern Studies. Albany, New York: State University of New York Press. ISBN 978-0-88706-810-2.
- Hinds, M. (1993). "Muʿāwiya I b. Abī Sufyān". In Bosworth, C. E.; van Donzel, E.; Heinrichs, W. P. & Pellat, Ch. (eds.). The Encyclopaedia of Islam, Second Edition. Volume VII: Mif–Naz. Leiden: E. J. Brill. pp. 263–268. ISBN 978-90-04-09419-2.
- Holt, Andrew; Curta, Florin (28 November 2016). Great Events in Religion: An Encyclopedia of Pivotal Events in Religious History [3 Volumes]. ABC-CLIO. ISBN 9781610695664.
- Hutton, Richard Holt; Bagehot, Walter (1858). National Review Volume 7. Oxford University.
- Ibn Abd al-Hakam, Abu'l Qāsim ʿAbd ar-Raḥman bin ʿAbdullah (1922). The History of the Conquest of Egypt, North Africa, and Spainfutuḥ misr wa akbārahā (Charles Torey ed.). Yale University Press.
- Ibn Hisham, Abu Muhammad 'Abd al-Malik bin Hisham ibn Ayyub (2019). Seerah Nabawi (Ali Nurdin Indonesian Translation ed.). Qisthi Press. p. 583.
- al Shafi'i, Muhammad ibn Idris (2018). Ar-Risalah (in Indonesian). Pustaka al Kautsar. p. 54. ISBN 9789795925842.
- Ibn Jarir at-Tabari, Muhammad (June 15, 2015). The History of Al-Tabari Vol. 10 The Conquest of Arabia: The Riddah Wars A.D. 632-633/A.H. 11 (Fred Donner Translation ed.). State University of New York Press. p. 46. ISBN 9781438401409.
- Ibn Jurais, Ghaythan ibn Ali (2018). "Jurash: Secrets of one of Saudi Arabia's most important archaeological sites revealed". Saudi Press Agency.
- Ibn Kathir, Abu al-Fiḍā ‘Imād Ad-Din Ismā‘īl ibn ‘Umar (2016). AI-Bidayah WAN-Nihayah.
- Idllalène, Samira (2021). Rediscovery and Revival in Islamic Environmental Law Back to the Future of Nature's Trust. ISBN 9781108488785.
- Jandora, John Walter (1986). "Developments in Islamic Warfare: The Early Conquests". Studia Islamica (64): 101–113. doi:10.2307/1596048. JSTOR 1596048.
- Kennedy, Hugh (2004) [1986]. The Prophet and the Age of the Caliphates: The Islamic Near East from the 6th to the 11th Century (Second ed.). Harlow: Longman. ISBN 978-0-582-40525-7.
- Kennedy, Hugh (2007). The Great Arab Conquests: How the Spread of Islam Changed the World We Live In. Philadelphia: Da Capo Press. ISBN 978-0-306-81585-0.
- Kennedy, Hugh (2013). The Armies of the Caliphs: Military and Society in the Early Islamic State. Routledge. p. 171. ISBN 978-1-134-53113-4.
- * Kennedy, Hugh; Baladhuri, ʾAḥmad ibn Yaḥyā ibn Jabir (2011). "The Feeding of the Five Hundred Thousand: Cities and Agriculture in Early Islamic Mesopotamia". Iraq. 73: 177–199. doi:10.1017/S0021088900000152. JSTOR 23350021. S2CID 128901895.
- Kenner, Jeffrey T. (2006). Muslim Rebels Kharijites and the Politics of Extremism in Egypt. Oxford University Press, USA. p. 28. ISBN 9780198030188.
- Kenney, Jeffrey T. (2006). Muslim Rebels: Kharijites and the Politics of Extremism in Egypt. Oxford University Press. ISBN 9780195131697.
- Khazanov, Anatoly M.; Wink, Andre (2012). Nomads in the Sedentary World. Taylor & Francis. ISBN 9781136121944.
- Al-Khudair, Abdul Karim bin Abdullah (2015). "الشمائل النبوية (17)" [Prophetic merits (17)]. Sheykh-el-Khudeyr. Department of Sunnah and its Sciences, Faculty of Theology, Imam Muhammad bin Saud University in Riyadh.
- Lydon, Ghyslaine (2009). On Trans-Saharan Trails Islamic Law, Trade Networks, and Cross-Cultural Exchange in Nineteenth-Century Western Africa. Cambridge University Press. p. 211. ISBN 9780521887243.
- Maclean, Derryl Nicolas (1989). Religion and Society in Arab Sind. Brill. p. 126. ISBN 978-90-04-08551-0.
- Madelung, Wilfred (1997). The Succession to Muhammad A Study of the Early Caliphate. Cambridge university Press. ISBN 9780521561815.
- Mappaseng, Irvan Setiawan (2018). SENI MEMANAH: DARI ZAMAN NABI MUHAMMAD HINGGA DINASTI UTSMANIYYAH (Indonesia ed.). Republika Publishing. p. 183. ISBN 9786025734755.
- Masih, Khalifatul (19 December 2019). "Men of Excellence friday sermon; quoting Al-Tabaqaat-ul-Kubra li ibn Sa'd, Vol. 3, p. 86, Dar-e-Ihyaa Al-Turath, Beirut, Lebanon, 1996; Dalail-ul-Nabuwwat Li Al-Behqi, Vol. 3, p. 39, Dar-ul-Kutub Al-Ilmiyyah, Beirut, Lebanon, 2002; (Al-Sirat al-Nabawiyyah li Ibn Hisham, p. 452, Dar-ul-Kutub al-Ilmiyyah, Beirut, Lebanon, 2001". al Hakam. Al Fazl International.
- Mayer, L. A. (1943). "Saracenic Arms and Armor". Ars Islamica. 10: 2. JSTOR 4515613.
- Meri, Josef W.; Bacharach, Jere L. (2006). Medieval Islamic Civilization: An Encyclopedia. Routledge. ISBN 0203957601.
- Montefiore, Simon Sebag (2012). Jerusalem: The Biography. Alvabet press. p. 219. ISBN 978-6029193022.
- Mubarakpuri, Saifur Rahman Al (2005), The sealed nectar: biography of the Noble Prophet, Darussalam Publications, p. 246, ISBN 978-9960-899-55-8
- Mutawalli, Ahmad Mustafa; Rahman, Hadi; Kamil, Muflih (2019). Syama'il Rasulullah (Indonesia ed.). Qisthi Press. ISBN 9789791303392.
- Nicolle, David (1982). The military technology of classical Islam. Thesis (Ph.D.) (Ph.D). Archived from the original on 22 October 2021.
- Natziger, George F.; Walton, Mark W. (2003). Islam at War: A History. Greenwood Publishing Group. ISBN 0275981010.
- Nicolle, David (1994). Yarmuk AD 636: The Muslim conquest of Syria. Osprey Publishing. ISBN 1855324148.
- Nicolle, David (1998). Armies of the Caliphates 862-1098. Osprey Publishing. ISBN 1855327708.
- O'shea, Stephen (June 24, 2008). Sea of Faith Islam and Christianity in the Medieval Mediterranean World (Digitized ed.). University of Michigan. p. 36. ISBN 9780802714985.
- Pellat, Charles (2011). "Abū Loʾloʾa". In Yarshater, Ehsan (ed.). Encyclopaedia Iranica.
- Perlman, Yaara (2015). "The Bodyguard of the Caliphs During the Umayyad and the Early Abbasid Periods". Al-Qanṭara. 36 (2): 315–340. doi:10.3989/alqantara.2015.009. ISSN 1988-2955.
- Petersen, Leif Inge Ree (2013). Siege Warfare and Military Organization in the Successor States (400-800 AD): Byzantium, the West and Islam. Leiden: Brill. ISBN 978-90-04-25199-1.
- Pramono, Agus (2021). Buku Perkembangan Ilmu Pengetahuan & Teknologi Dalam Perspektif Islam [Book on the Development of Science & Technology in Islamic Perspective]. DeePublish. p. 44. ISBN 978-6230232282.
- Rasheed, Mahmud. "al silah mawaridah, wa dhawaaith asta'malah, waltadriba 'Alaihi fii al hadii al nabiyyu (Weapons, their resources, controls for their use, and training in the Prophet's guidance)".
- Rashid, Aressa Mussa (1983). "The role of the Shurta in early Islam". Literatures, Languages, and Cultures PhD Thesis Collection.
- Rezavi, Syed Ali Nadeem (2006). "The Shia Muslims". History of Science, Philosophy and Culture in Indian Civilization. 2 (2).
- Saifuz Zaman, MD (2015). "Yarmouk – The Necessity of Studying the Battle in Early Medieval Military Historiography". Journal of Military and Strategic Studies. 16 (2): 8–20.
- Sebeos, Unknown first name; Howard-Johnston, James; Greenwood, Tim (1999). The Armenian history attributed to Sebeos Part 1. Liverpool University Press. ISBN 9780853235644.
- Salabi, Ali Muhammad. Biografi Abu Bakar Ash-Shiddiq. Pustaka Al Kautsar press. p. 527.
- Schiettecatte, Jérémie; Zouache, Abbès (2017). "The Horse in Arabia and the Arabian Horse: Origins, Myths and Realities". Chroniques Yéménites. 8 (8). doi:10.4000/cy.3280.
- Shaban, M.A. (1976). Islamic History: Volume 1, AD 600-750 (AH 132) A New Interpretation. Cambridge University Press. ISBN 9780521291316.
- Shoshan, Boaz (7 Sep 2015). The Arabic Historical Tradition and the Early Islamic Conquests: Folklore, Tribal Lore, Holy War. Routledge. p. 139. ISBN 978-1317420262.
- Spaulding, Jay (1995). "Medieval Christian Nubia and the Islamic World: A Reconsideration of the Baqt Treaty". The International Journal of African Historical Studies. 28 (3): 577–594. doi:10.2307/221175. JSTOR 221175.
- Tabari, Muhammad Ibn Jarir (2015). The History of Al-Tabari Vol. 11 The Challenge to the Empires A.D. 633-635/A.H. 12-13 (Blankinship translation ed.). State University of New York Press. p. 46. ISBN 9781438401409.
- Britannica Editors. "Al-Yaʿqūbī Arab historian and geographer". Encyclopedia Britannica.
- Upton, Peter (2006) [1998]. Amirsadeghi, Hossein (ed.). Arabians. Rik van Lent, photographer. Lincoln: First Chronicle Books. ISBN 978-0-8118-5401-6.
- Vaglieri, L. V. (1965). "Dūmat al-Djandal". In Lewis, B.; Pellat, Ch. & Schacht, J. (eds.). The Encyclopaedia of Islam, Second Edition. Volume II: C–G. Leiden: E. J. Brill. p. 624–626. OCLC 495469475.
- Walker, C.T. Harley (1917). "Jahiz of Basra to Al-Fath Ibn Khaqan on the "Exploits of the Turks and the Army of the Khalifate in General"". The Journal of the Royal Asiatic Society of Great Britain and Ireland: 631–697. JSTOR 25189369.
- Wellhausen, Julius (1927). The Arab Kingdom and Its Fall. Translated by Margaret Graham Weir. Calcutta: University of Calcutta.
- Zakeri, Mohsen (1995). Sasanid Soldiers in Early Muslim Society: The Origins of 'Ayyārān and Futuwwa. Otto Harrassowitz Verlag. pp. 1–391. ISBN 3447036524.
- Zaky, A. Rahman (1961). Introduction to the Study of Islamic Swords and Armour. Gladius I. p. 21.
