= Tafsir al-Khazin =

Book by Ala al-Din al-Khazin

Lubab al-Tawil fi Ma'ani al-Tanzil
- 1289 AH manuscript excerpt
- Author: 'Ala al-Din al-Khazin
- Original title: لباب التأويل في معاني التنزيل
- Working title: Tafsir al-Khazin
- Language: Arabic
- Subject: Tafsir
- Genre: Classical
- Published: 14th century
- Media type: Print
- ISBN: 978-2-7451-4459-1 (Beirut, 2004)
- OCLC: 48193286
- Dewey Decimal: 297.1227

Lubab al-Tawil fi Ma'ani al-Tanzil (Arabic: لباب التأويل في معاني التنزيل), commonly known as Tafsir al-Khazin (Arabic: تفسير الخازن), is a 14th-century Sunni Quranic commentary authored by 'Ala al-Din al-Khazin. Completed in 725 AH (1325 CE), this work is a summary of Ma'ālim al-Tanzīl by al-Baghawi. It is primarily a tafsir bil-mathur (interpretation based on transmitted reports) but also incorporates analytical methods, drawing on Quranic cross-references, hadith, jurisprudential discussions, and occasional Arabic poetry.

== Background ==
Tafsir al-Khazin was completed by 'Ala al-Din al-Khazin on 10 Ramadan 725 AH (which corresponds to 20 August 1325 CE). Al-khazin states in his muqaddimah, that Tafsir al-Khazin is essentially a summary of Ma'ālim al-Tanzīl by al-Baghawi. For al-Khazin, al-Baghawi’s tafsir holds significant credibility, and therefore, it serves as the primary reference.

Al-Khazin admired al-Baghawi for his knowledge and for reviving the Sunnah. He valued Maalim al-Tanzil (Tafsir al-Baghawi) for its authentic hadiths, legal discussions, and historical narratives. In his tafsir, al-Khazin shortened long stories, omitted most isnads (chains of narration), and incorporated material from other tafsirs, including Mafatih al-Ghayb and Anwar al-Tanzil.

The work was printed several times in Egypt between 1287 and 1317 AH (equivalent to 1870–1899 CE), often with Madarik al-Tanzil included in the margins. Later editions included commentaries attributed to Ibn al-Arabi and reprints alongside Maalim al-Tanzil. A modern three-volume abridged edition with annotations was published by Abd al-Ghani al-Daqqar (Damascus, 1415 AH / 1994 CE).

A Turkish translation, Anfes al-Jawaher, was prepared by Musa ibn Haci Huseyin al-Izniki. Four manuscript copies of this translation are preserved in Istanbul, in the Beyazit State Library and the Topkapi Palace Museum.

== Content and methodology ==
Before beginning his commentary, al-Khazin outlines five main topics: the virtue of studying the Quran, the risks of interpreting it without proper knowledge, the compilation and order of revelation, the Quran's revelation in seven modes (ahruf), and the meaning of tafsir and tawil.

The tafsir combines both transmitted (riwayah) and analytical (dirayah) approaches. Al-Khazin relies primarily on traditional sources (tafsir bil-mathur) but applies reasoning when needed, following the tahlili method. He interprets verses by referring to other Quranic passages and hadiths and discusses theological (aqidah) and legal (fiqi) issues within Ash'ari and Shafi'i frameworks. Full chains of narration (isnad) are generally omitted, with sources indicated using abbreviations or author names. Hadiths from Sahih al-Bukhari and Sahih Muslim are marked with symbols, while narrations from other collections are cited directly. Al-Khazin also draws on Arabic poetry and Israʼiliyyat reports to illustrate meanings and link verses.

Each surah is introduced with its name, place of revelation (Makkan or Madinan), and the number of verses, words, and letters. He frequently notes the asbab al-nuzul (occasions of revelation) and hadiths regarding the virtues of the surah. The commentary proceeds verse by verse, explaining words and sentences, providing moral guidance and warnings, and including historical accounts and stories. Although al-Khazin occasionally critiques weak or fabricated Israiliyat reports, many narratives are included without further evaluation.

In verifying hadiths, he consults works such as al-Jam bayna al-Sahihayn and Jami' al-Usul fi Ahadith al-Rasul, and records narrations cited by al-Baghawi using either his own or al-Thalabi's chain.

== Literary sources ==
As a reference, al-Khazin cited sources for his interpretation from a wide range of scholarly disciplines, drawing on the works of experts in tafsir, hadith, Arabic grammar, and related fields. Among the tafsir scholars, he frequently referenced al-Tabari, Fakhr al-Din al-Razi, al-Tusi, Ibn 'Atiyya, al-Qurtubi, and al-Wahidi. From hadith scholars, he drew upon the works of Muhammad al-Bukhari, Muslim, al-Nawawi, and Qadi Iyad. In the field of grammar, he cited authorities such as Abu Ishaq al-Zajjaj, Al-Farra, Abd al-Qahir al-Jurjani, Al-Kisa'i, sibawayh, and Ibn al-Anbari.

== Critical studies ==
- Mansur, Nafi Sad Ahmad (2018). The methodology of Imam al-Khazin in exegesis through his book Lubab al-Ta'wil fi Ma'ani al-Tanzil (MA thesis) (in Arabic). Sudan: Shendi University.
- Yusuff, Mohd Sholeh Sheh; Haji-Othman, Yusuf; Arsad, Syahiza (2021). "A Critical Analysis of The Influence of Tafsir Al-Khazin In Tafsir Nur Al-Ihsan Based on Genetic Approach". The journal of contemporary issues in business and government. 27 (3): 2181–2185. ISSN 1323-6903.
- Hassan, Rushdya R. A. (2015). "Analytical study of a manuscript, 'Tafsir Al khazin ' - the seventeenth century AD" (PDF). Current Science International. 4 (2): 196–207.
- Zulkarnaini, Zulfikri (2021). "Menyoal Penafsiran Al-Khazin Dalam Tafsir Lubab Al-Ta'wil Fi Ma'ani Al-Tanzil". Jurnal Ulunnuha. 10 (2): 204–220. doi:10.15548/ju.v10i2.3429. ISSN 2685-6050.
- Hasanah, Nurul; Agung, Ahmad Andi; M. Ikhsan Iskandar Putra (2022). "Ad-Dakhil dalam Surah Al-Anbiya' Ayat 83-84 (Studi Kitab Tafsir Al-Khazin)". Salimiya: Jurnal Studi Ilmu Keagamaan Islam (in Indonesian). 3 (3). ISSN 2721-7078. Archived from the original on 11 September 2024.
- Amalia, Ilma; Lubis, Mumun Fitriana; Komarudin, Edi (2024). "An Analysis of the Interpretation of Verses About Religious Pluralism in the Book of Tafsir Lubab at-Ta'wil fi Ma'ani at-Tanzil, Tafsir An-Nasafi, Tafsir Ruh Al-Ma'ani and Tibyan fi Tafsir Al-Qur'an (Study of Tafsir Muqaran )". Jurnal Studi Islam dan Sosial (in Indonesian). 7 (1): 14–35. doi:10.61941/iklila.v7i1.236. ISSN 2797-9172.
- AlSudais, Saleh Bin Abdulaziz; Batool Bent (2019). "The translation of Imam Al-Khazen and his method of interpreting it (for interpretation in the meanings of downloading)". Journal of the Faculty of Islamic and Arabic Studies for Girls, Al-Azhar University (in Arabic). 3 (5): 63–94. doi:10.21608/fica.2019.97053. ISSN 2535-146X.

== See also ==
- List of tafsir works
- List of Sunni books
