= 'Ala al-Din al-Khazin =

14th century Sunni exegete and hadith scholar

Imam Alāʾ al-Dīn al-Khāzin
- علاء الدين الخازن
- Title: ʿAlāʾ al-Dīn; Al-Ḥāfiẓ

Personal life
- Born: 1279 Baghdad
- Died: 1341 (aged 61–62) Aleppo
- Era: Mamluk period
- Region: Levant
- Main interest(s): Hadith, Tafsir, Islamic jurisprudence, History, Tasawwuf
- Notable work(s): Tafsir al-Khazin
- Occupation: Scholar, Traditionist, Exegete, Jurist, Historian, Sufi,

Religious life
- Religion: Islam
- Denomination: Sunni
- Jurisprudence: Shafi'i
- Creed: Ash'ari

Muslim leader
- Influenced by: Al-Shafi'i Abu Hasan al-Ash'ari Al-Baghawi

ʿAlāʾ al-Dīn ʿAlī ibn Muḥammad al-Baghdādī (Arabic: علاء الدين علي بن محمد البغدادي), widely known as ʿAlāʾ al-Dīn al-Khāzin (Arabic: علاء الدين الخازن), was a distinguished muḥaddith (scholar of ḥadīth), mufassir (Qurʾānic exegete), muʾarrikh (historian), and sufi. He is best known for his tafsir, Lubāb al-taʾwīl fī maʿānī al-tanzīl.

== Life ==
He was born in Baghdad into a family originally from Halab (Aleppo), twenty-two years after the Mongol destruction of Baghdad and two decades after the Mamluk victory at the battle of Battle of Ain Jalut. Thus, al-Khāzin's birth coincided with the Mamluk's dominance over the Islamic world, with Egypt as their political center.

His early education took place in Baghdad, where he learned Qurʾānic recitation and memorization, alongside studies in Arabic grammar. He later dedicated himself to hadith studies under prominent scholars such as ʿAlī ibn al-Dawālībī (d. 728/1328). Moving from one Halaqa (study circle) to another, he absorbed knowledge from numerous teachers before relocating to Damascus, where he pursued his studies more intensively. Among his teachers there was Sitt al-Wuzarāʾ bint ʿUmar (d. 716/1316), a respected Ḥanbalī scholar and the daughter of a renowned jurist. He also studied under Bahāʾ al-Dīn al-Qāsim ibn al-Muẓaffar (d. 723/1323), a learned scholar known for his extensive education, and later travelled to Halab for further study.

In Damascus, al-Khāzin frequented various madrasahs, mosques, and khānqāhs, particularly the Khānqāh al-Sumaysāṭiyyah, where he spent significant time in its library. His close association with this institution eventually earned him the title al-Khāzin (“the librarian”). During this period, he authored numerous works across different disciplines and shared his writings with his students. Al-Khāzin died in Aleppo at the end of the month of Rajab in the year 741 (19 January 1341) and was buried in the Sufis cemetery.

== Works ==
Al-Khāzin wrote on a range of subjects, including ḥadīth, tafsīr, and sīrah of the Prophet. However, only his works on tafsīr and sīrah have been published. Some of his known writings include:

1. Lubāb al-taʾwīl fī maʿānī al-tanzīl – A commentary on the Qur'an (tafsīr).
2. Maqbūl al-manqūl – It is a ten-volume collection on ḥadīth. In this work, al-Khāzin gathered the traditions found in Musnad al-Shāfiʿī, Musnad Aḥmad ibn Ḥanbal, the Kutub al-Sittah, al-Muwaṭṭaʾ, and Sunan al-Dāraqutnī, arranging them systematically chapter by chapter.
3. Al-Rawḍ wa al-ḥadāʾiq fī tahdhīb sīrat khayr al-khalāʾiq – A treatise on the life of the Prophet (sīrah).

== See also ==
- List of Ash'aris

== Bibliography ==
- Zakiyah, Ermita (2024). "Disambiguation of Tafsir Khazin in Muqodimah and its application in Tafsir Lubab al-Ta'wil fi Ma'ani al-Tanzil". Jurnal Studi Al-Qur'an. 20 (2): 221–231. doi:10.21009/jsq.20.2.07. ISSN 2339-2614.
- Abdullah A. Khan (14 July 2024). Imam al-Khāzin and His Tafsīr: Lubāb al-Taʾwīl fī Maʿānī al-Tanzīl (PDF). pp. 1–6.
