= Raden Fatah State Islamic University =

University in Indonesia

- Universitas Islam Negeri Raden Fatah
- Type: Public
- Established: 13 November 1964
- Rector: Nyayu Khodijah
- Location: Palembang, South Sumatra, Indonesia; 2°57′49″S 104°44′56.2″E
- Campus: Perkotaan
- Website: radenfatah.ac.id
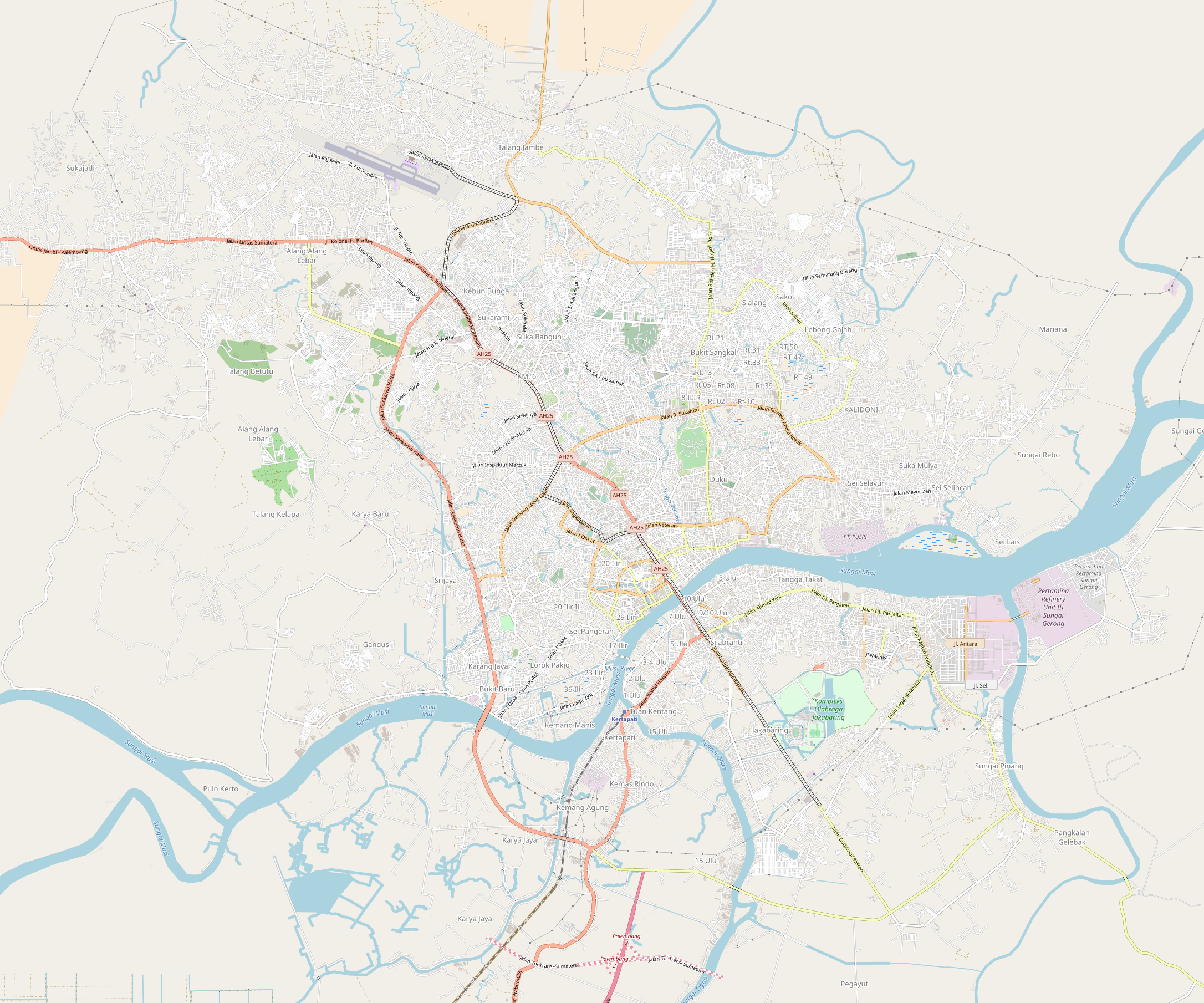
- Location in Palembang

Raden Fatah State Islamic University (Indonesian: Universitas Islam Negeri Raden Fatah) is an Indonesian Islamic public university in Palembang, capital of South Sumatra. It was founded in 1964.

== History ==
As with many other State Islamic Universities in Indonesia, Raden Fatah was founded as an IAIN (Institut Agama Islam Negeri). Prior to its founding, ulama from across the nation met in Palembang on 1957 and agreed to form a sharia law faculty. The following year, a Foundation for Higher Islamic Education in South Sumatra was founded. The institution received a formal approval from the Ministry of Religious Affairs on 1964, and is inaugurated on 13 November.

The university received its name from Raden Patah, founder of the Demak kingdom.

== Students ==
In 2017, the university had a freshman class of 2,463 students. It offers nine subjects for students through the SBMPTN.
