= Masabih al-Sunnah =

Collection of hadith

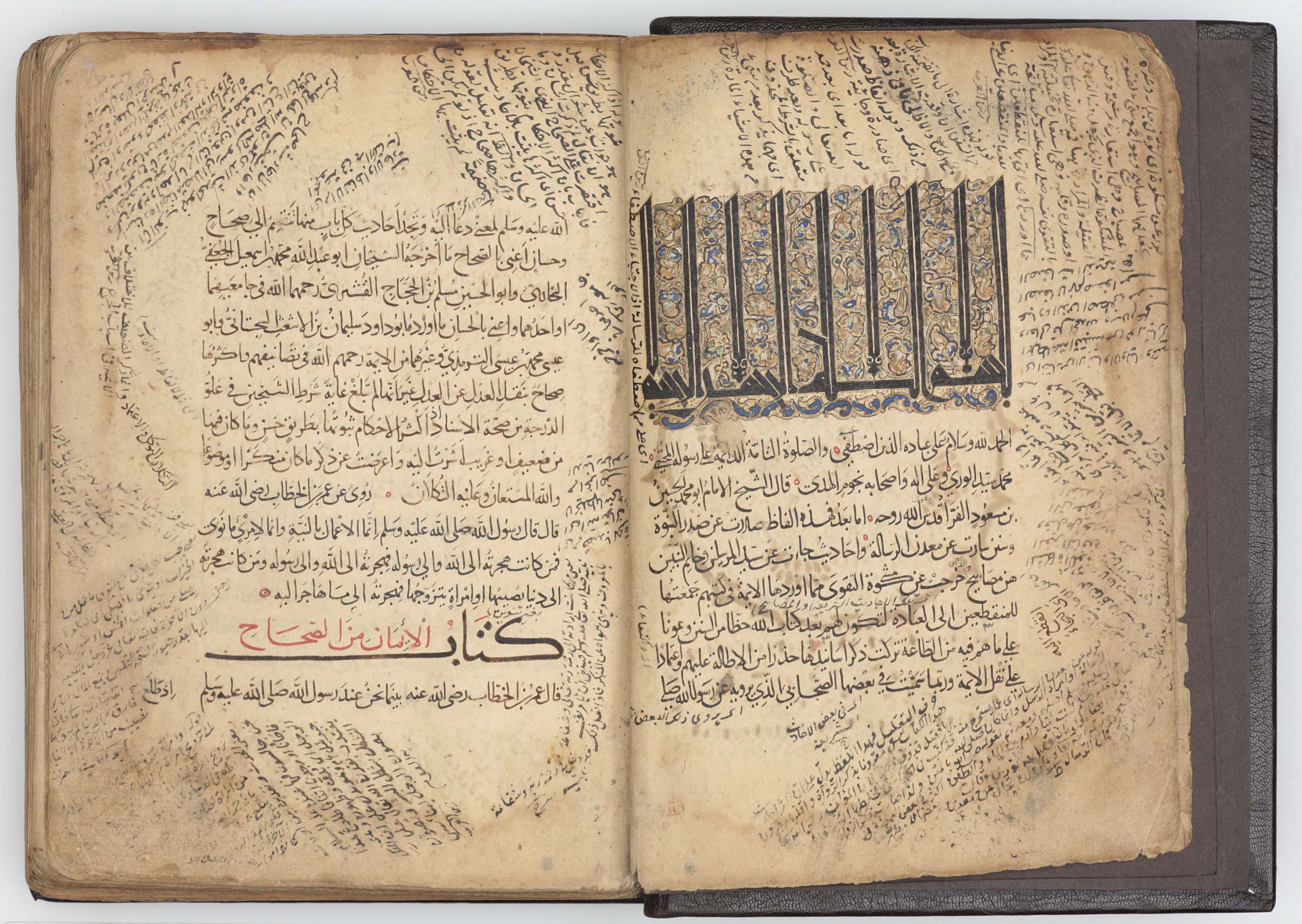
Manuscript of the Masabih al-Sunnah, Iraq or Iran, 1100AD. Khalili Collection of Islamic Art

Masabih al-Sunnah is a collection of hadith by the Persian Shafi'i scholar Abu Muhammad al-Husayn ibn Mas'ud ibn Muhammad al-Farra' al-Baghawi, from sometime before 516 H. An improved version of this work, Mishkat al-Masabih, has additional hadith, and was the work of another Persian traditionist Al-Tabrizi d. 741H.

== Description ==
The collection is divided into a number of books which are divided into chapters which are further divided into two separate sections, one for Sahih ahadeeth as labeled by him ( from the collections of Bukhari and Muslim), the second section was for hasan ahadeeth according to his own labelling (from Al-Tirmidhi, Abu Dawud and others). Al-Tabrizi would alter certain ahadeeth positions in his own collection.

== Features of the Collection ==
- Al-Baghawi omitted the isnads of these ahadeeth but kept the names of the Sahaba to whom the ahadith were traced.
- Part of his purpose, as explained in the introduction, was to enlighten Muslims about certain things of which the Quran is silent.
- Contains a grand total of 4434 ahadeeth.
- 2434 are from Sahih section:

325 Sahih Bukhari Only
875 Sahih Muslim Only
1234 from both Sahih Bukhari and Sahih Muslim

- Al-Baghawi tells which ahadeeth from the second section of his work are gharib and da'if
- A number of commentaries were made on this collection. Tuhfat Al-Abrar, Al-Maysir and the commentary by Abd al-Qadir ibn 'Abd Allah al-Suhrawardi.
