= Al-Jahiz bibliography =

The bibliography of ʻAmr ibn Baḥr al-Jāḥiẓ (ca. 773 - 869) are the titles listed in chapter five of al-Fihrist of Isḥāq al-Nadīm (d. ca. 998). Most of Chap. V, §1 survives only in the Beatty MS and is published in the English edition by Bayard Dodge (New York, 1970). An incomplete list is found also in the Irshād al-Arīb alā Ma’rifat al-Adīb ('Dictionary of Learned Men') by Yāqūt al-Hamawī (1179-1229).

== Published works ==
- Kitāb al-Ḥayawān (كتاب الحيوان) ‘Book of Animals’; in seven sections (Note: Al-Fihrist gives a list of the first and last words of the different sections of Kitāb al-Ḥayawān.) is dedicated to Muḥammad ibn ‘Abd al-Mālik al-Zayyāt, who paid him 5,000 gold coins (5., dīnār).
- Kitāb al-Nisā’ (النسْاء) ‘Women’; on differences between the sexes. Appended to al-Ḥayawān.
- Kitāb al-Bighāl (البغال) ‘The Mules’. (Note: Title given incorrectly by Yāqūt, Irshād, VI (6), 75. See modern edition Kitāb al-Qawl fī al-Bighāl ('Le Livre des mulets'), ed., Pellat, 1955.) Al-Nadīm saw these two books written in the handwriting of Zakarīyā’ ibn Yaḥyā ibn Sulaymān, Abū Yaḥyā, who was a warrāq (scribe) of al-Jāḥiẓ.
- Kitāb al-Ibil (الإبل) ‘The Camel’; al-Nadīm notes this book did not resemble the style of al-Jāḥiẓ.
- Kitāb al-Bayān wa-al-Tabyīn (البيان والتبيين) 'The Book of Eloquence and Exposition'; dedicated to Ibn Abī Dā’ūd, (Note: Abū ‘Abd Allāh Aḥmad Ibn Abī Dā'ūd (d. 854) of Damascus. He went to Baghdād before 833, was appointed qāḍī (judge) by al-Mu’taṣim and vizier by al-Mutawakkil. He died in disgrace.) who paid him 5,000 gold coins.
- Kitāb al-Zar’ wa-al-Nakhl (الزرْع والنخل) 'The Book of Sowing and the Palm Tree’; dedicated to Ibrāhīm ibn ‘Abbās al-Ṣūlī, who paid him 5,000 gold coins. (Note: the Beatty MS gives this title but Yāqūt gives Kitāb al-Zar’ wa-al-Nahl ('The Book of Sowing and the Bees'))

== Bibliography list from Beatty MS of al-Fihrist ==
- Kitāb al-Bayān wa-al-Tabyīn (البيان والتبيين) ‘Explanation and Exposition’; (Note: Al-Nadīm notes that of two extant manuscripts, the second was more accurate and excellent;)
- al-Zar’ wa-al-Nakhl (الزرع والنخل) ‘Sowing and the Palm Tree’
- al-Farq bayn al-Nabī wa-al-Mutanabbī (الفرق بين النبى والمتنبى) ‘The Difference between a Prophet and One Claiming to Be a Prophet’;
- al-Ma‘rifah (المعرْفة) ‘Knowledge’;
- Jawābāt min jawāb Kitāb al-Ma’rifah (جوابات من جواب كتاب المعرفة) The Replies of the Book of Knowledge;
- Masā’īl Kitāb al-Ma’rifah (مسايل كتاب المعرفة) 'Questions of the Book of Knowledge';
- al-radd ‘alā ṣihāb al-ālhāmi (الرد على صحابِ الالهامِ) 'Refutation of Those Who Claim to Have Divine Inspiration';
- Naẓm al-Qur’ān, thalāthat nusakh (نظم القران ثلثة نُسّخ) 'Order of the Qur’ān, three copies’;
- Masā’īl fī’l-Qur’ān (المسائل في القران) 'Questions in the Qur’ān;
- Fadhīlah al-Mu‘tazilah (فضيلة المعُتزلةِ) 'Excellence of the Mu‘tazilah;
- al-radd ‘alā al-Mushabbihah (الردّ على المشبهة) Refutation of the Mushabbihah;
- Ḥikāyat Qawl Aṣnaf al-Zaydīyah (حكاية قول اصنافِ الزيديّة) Statement about the Declaration of the Branches of the Zaydīyah’
- al-Imāmat ‘alā madhhab al-Shī’ah (الامَامَة على مَذهَب الشيعة) 'The Imamate, according to the Doctrine of the Shī’ah'.
- al-‘Uthmānīyah (العُثمانية)
- Historical Traditions and How They Are Valid; (الاخرارُ وكَيف بصّح)
- Refutation of the Christians; (الردّ على النصارى)
- The Heavy-Spoken Man of al-Mirbad; (عبام المربد)
- Refutation of the ‘Uthmānīyah; (الردّ على العُثمانية)
- The Caliphate of Mu’āwiyah; (إمَامَة معةية)
- Imāmat Banī al-‘Abbās (إمَامَة بنى العباسُ) ‘The Caliphate of the ‘Abbāsids’
- al-Fityan (الفتيان) ‘The Two Youths’
- al-Quwwād (القُوّاد) The Leaders (Military Chiefs)
- al-Luṣūṣ (اللصُوص) ‘The Robbers’
- Dhikr mā bayn al-Zaydīyah wa-al-Rāfiḍah(ذكر ما بين الزيدية والرافضة) 'Mention of what is [shared] between the Zaydīyah and the Rāfiḍah';
- al-Tawḥīd (المخاطات في التوحيدِ) ‘Discourse about Oneness’
- Ṣanā'ah al-Kalām (صناعة الكلام) The Art (Formation) of Speech;
- Taṣwib ‘Alī fī taḥkīm al-ḥakamīn (تصويب على في تحكيم الحكمين) ‘Praising of ‘Alī, about giving authority to the judges’
- Wujūb al-Imāmah (وُجُوبِ الامامة) ‘Things Necessary for the Caliphate’
- al-Aṣnām (الاصنام) ‘Idols’
- al-Wukalā’ wa-al-Muwakkalīn (الوكلا والموكلن) ‘Deputies and Guardians’
- al-Shārib wa-al-Mashrūb (الشارِبُ وَالمشرُوب) ‘The Drinker and What Is Drunk’
- Iftikhār al-Shitā’ wa-al-Sayf (إفتخارالشتا والصيف) ‘The Glory of Winter and Summer’
- al-Mu‘allimīn (المعلمين) ‘The Teachers’
- al-Jawārī (الجوارى) ‘Slave Girls; or al-Ḥawārī (الحوارى) ‘Associates’;
- Nawādir al-Ḥusn (نوادر الحسْن) ‘Rare Forms of Goodness ‘; or Nawādir al-Ḥasan (نوادْر الحَسَن) ‘Rare Anecdotes about al-Ḥasan’
- al-Bukhalā’ (البُخلا) ‘The Misers’
- Farq ma bayn fī ‘Abd Shams wa-Makhzūm (فرْق ما بين في عبد شمسّ وَمخزُوم) The Difference between the Banū ‘Abd Shams and Makhzūm;
- al-‘Urjān wa-al-Burṣān (العرصان والبرصان) ‘The Lame and the Lepers’;
- Takhir al-Qaḥṭānīa wa-al-‘Adnānīa (تخرالقحطانية والعدنانية) Nobility of the Members of Qaḥṭān and ‘Adnān;
- al-Tarbi‘ wa-al-Tadwīr (التربيع وَالتدويرُ) ‘Making a Quadrangle and a Circle’
- al-Tufaylīyīn (الطفيلين) ‘Humble Companions’
- Akhlāq al-Mulūk (اخلاقِ الملُوكِ) ‘Dispositions of the Kings’
- al-Futyā (الفتيا) ‘The Judicial Interpretation’
- Manāqib Jund al-Khilāfah wa-Faḍā’il al-Atrāk (مناقب جند الخلافة وفضايل الاتراك) Excellence of the Troops of the Caliphate and Superior Qualities of the Turks’.
- al-Ḥāsid wa-al-Maḥsūd (الحاسِد والمحسُود) ‘The Envious and the Envied’
- al-radd ‘alā al-Hūdd (الرد على الهُود) Refutation of the Jews;
- al-Ṣuraḥā’ wa-al-Hujanā’ (الصُرَ حَا والهُجنَا) The Pure [-Blooded] and the Sons of Slave Mothers
- al-Sūdān wa-al-Bīḍān (السُودان وا البيضان) ‘The Blacks and the Whites’
- al-Ma‘ād wa-al-Ma‘āsh (المعاد والمعاش) ‘Life in the Next World and the Present Life’
- al-Nisā’ (النسْا) ‘Women’ (See published books)
- al-Taswīyah bayn al-‘Arab wa-al-‘Ajam (التسوية بين العرْب والعجم) 'Comparison between the Arabs and Persians (Foreigners);
- al-Sultān wa-Ikhlāwahluhu (السلطان واخلاواهله)The Government (al-Sultan) and the Dispositions of Its People (Administrators);
- al-Wa’īd (الوعيد) ‘The Threat’
- al-Buldān (البلدان) ‘The Towns’ (Regions)
- al-Akhbār (الاخبَارُ) ‘Historical Traditions
- al-Dalālah ‘alā an al-Imāmah Farḍ (الدلالة على ان الا مامة فرْض) ‘The Demonstration that the Imamate is a Divine Command’
- al-Istiṭā’ah wa-Khalq al-Af‘āl (الاشْتطاعة وَ خلق الافعَال) 'Predestination and Creation of Action'; (Note: al-istiṭā‘ah; man’s ability to appropriate a foreordained action. Khalq al-af‘āl divine “creation of actions,” before man appropriates them.)
- al-Muqayyinīn wa-al-Ghanā’ wa-al-Ṣan‘ah (المقينين وَالغنا والصنعة) ‘The Artisans (Saddle Makers), Wealth and Craftwork’
- al-Hadāyā (الهدايا) ‘Gifts’
- al-Manḥūl (منحول) ‘The Emaciated’ (The Plagiarized)
- al-Ikhwān (الاخوان) ‘The Brothers’
- al-radd ‘alā man al-Ḥad fī kitāb Allāh (الردّ على من الحَد في كتاب الله) ‘Refutation of Whoever Has Apostatized, about the Book of Allāh’
- Ay al-Qur’ān (اي القُران) ‘What Is the Qur’ān?’
- al-‘Āshiq al-Nāshī al-Mutalāshī (العاشق الناشى المتلاشى) ‘The Amorous: Growing Hot, Growing Cold’ (Note: al-‘āshiq (“the amorous”) omitted in Yāqūt (see n. 131). The other words mean literally, “increasing and vanishing.”)
- Ḥanūt ‘Aṭṭār (حانوت عطارُ) ‘A Perfume Shop’
- al-Tamthīl (التمثيل) ‘The Comparison’
- Faḍl al-‘Ilm (فضل العِلمِ) ‘The Excellence of Learning’
- al-Mirāh wa-al-Jadd (المراح والجد) ‘Gaiety and Earnestness’
- Jamharat al-Mulūk (جمهرة الملُوك) ‘The Assembly of Kings’
- al-Ṣawālijah (الصوَالجة) ‘Polo Sticks’
- Dhamm al-Zinā’ (ذم الزناء) ‘Denouncing Fornication’
- al-Tafakkur wa-al-I‘tibār (التفكُرُ والاعتبارُ) ‘Meditation and Consideration’
- al-Ḥujjah wa-al-Nubūwah (الحُجّة وَالنُبُوّة) ‘Proof and Prophecy’
- al-mukātabah (الى إبْرهيم بن المدبِيّرفي المكاتبة) ‘to Ibrāhīm ibn al-Mudabbir about correspondence’
- Iḥālat al-Qudrah ‘alā al-Ẓulm (احالة القُدرة على الظُلم) ‘The Trickery of Force [Employed] against Oppression’
- Ummahāt al-Awlād (امهات الاوالدِ) ‘Freed Slave Mothers of Children’
- al-I‘tizāl wa-Faḍluhu ‘an al-Faḍīlah (الاعتزال وفضلة عن الفضيلة) ‘The Doctrine of the Mu‘tazilah and Its Excellence Due to Superior Virtue’
- al-Akhṭār wa-al-Marātib wa-al-Ṣinā‘āt (الاخطارَ والمراتب والصناعات) ‘Dignities, Ranks, and Professions’
- Uḥdūthat al-‘Ālam (احدُوثة العالم) ‘Story of the World’
- al-Radd 'alā man za'amān al-Insān juz lā yatajazza (الرد على من زَعَمَان الانسان جُزٌ لا يتجزا) 'Refutation of Whoever Supposes that Man Is One Piece (Juz’) and Not Divided (Yatajazza’)
- Abū al-Najm wa-jawābhu(ابى النجم وجَوابه) 'Abū al-Najm and His Reply';
- al-Tuffāḥ (التفاح) ‘The Apple’
- al-Uns wa-al-Salwah (الانسْ وَالسّلوه) ‘Social Life and Contentment’
- al-Ḥazm wa-al-‘Azm (الحزم وَالعزم) ‘Steadfastness and Resolution’
- al-Kibar al-Mustaḥsan wa-al-Mustaqbah (الكبر المسْتحسْن وَالمُسْتقبح) ‘The Great, the Beautiful, and the Ugly’
- Naqḍ al-Ṭibb (نقض الطب) ‘Refutation of Medicine’
- ‘Unāṣir al-Ādāb (عنصِر الاداب) ‘The Elements of Morals’
- Taḥṣīn al-Amwāl (تحصين الاموال) ‘Preserving Possessions’
- al-Umthāl (الامثال) 'Similes (Proverbs)';
- Faḍīl al-Faras ‘alā al-Himlāj (فضيل الفُرس على الهملاج) ‘Superiority of the Horse over the Pack Animal’
- al-Āsad wa-al-Dhi’b (الاسَد وَالذئب) ‘The Lion and the Wolf’;
- al-Mulūk wa-al-Umam: al-Sālifah wa-al-Bāqiyah (الملوك والامم السالفه والباقية) 'The Kings and the Nations: Those Extinct and Those Surviving';
- al-Quḍāh wa-al-Wulāh (القضاه وَالولاه) ‘Judges and Governors’;
- al-‘Ālim wa-al-Jāhil (العالم والجاهل) ‘The Wise and the Ignorant’;
- al-Nard wa-al-Shaṭranj (النرْد والشظرنج) al-Nard (Note: Abbreviation of nardashīr, a type of boardgame like checkers or backgammon. See Shatranj) and Chess’;
- Ghashsh al-Ṣina‘āt (غش الصناعات) ‘Adulteration of the Crafts’
- Khuṣūmat al-Ḥūl wa-al-‘Ūr (خصومه الحُول وَالعُرْ) ‘Dispute between the Cross-Eyed Man and the Man Blind in One Eye’
- Dhawī al-‘Āhāt (ذوى العاهات) ‘Stricken by Blights’
- al-Mughannīyīn (المغنين) ‘The Singers’
- Akhlāq al-Shuṭṭār (اخلاق الشطار) ‘The Manners of Those Who Pester Their Friends’.

== Epistles ==
- Risālatuhu alā Abū al-Faraj ibn Najjāḥ fī imtiḥān ‘uqūl al-awliyā’(رِسَّالتهُ الى البو الفرج بن نحباح في امتحان عفول الاوليا) 'His epistle to Abū al-Faraj ibn Najjāḥ about examining the wise ideas (minds) of the ancients';
- Risālatuhu alā Abū Najm fī al-kharāj (ابو النجم في الخراج) 'His epistle to Abū al-Najm about the land tax';
- Risālatuhu fī al-qalm (في القلم) 'His epistle about the pen (script)';
- Risālatuhu fī faḍl ittikhādh al-kutub (في فضل التجاد الكتب) 'His epistle about excellence in choice of books;
- Risālatuhu kitmān al-sirr (كتمن السِّر) 'His epistle about keeping a secret';
- Risālatuhu madh al-nabīdh (في مَدح النبيد) 'His epistle about praise of wine';
- Risālatuhu dhamm al-nabīdh (في ذم البنيد) 'His epistle about the reproach of wine';
- Risālatuhu al-‘afw wa-al-ṣafḥ (في العفو والصفح) 'His epistle about forgiveness and pardon';
- Risālatuhu ithm al-sukr (في اثم السكر) ‘His epistle about the offense of drunkenness’;
- Risālatuhu al-amal wa-al-ma’mūl (الامل والمامُول) ‘His epistle about hope and the hoped-for’;
- Risālatuhu fī al-ḥilyah (في الحلبة) ‘His epistle about ornament (elegance of literary style);’
- Risālatuhu dhamm al-kuttāb (في ذم الكتاب) ‘His epistle about the reproach of secretaries;
- Risālatuhu fī madh al-warrāqūn (في مَدح الورّاقين) ‘His epistle in praise of the warrāqūn’;
- Risālatuhu fī mawh al-Kitāb (في موح الكتاب) ‘His epistle on suggestiveness of the book;
- Risālatuhu fī dhamihim (في ذمهم) ‘His epistle about reproaching them’;
- Risālatuhu fiman (رسَّالتة فمن بسمىِ من الشعر عمراء) ‘His epistle about who among the poets was named ‘Umar’;
- Risālatuhu fī farq jahl Ya‘qūb ibn Isḥāq al-Kindī (في فرْط جهل يعقوب بن السحق الكندى) ‘His epistle about the excess of the ignorance of Ya‘qūb ibn Isḥāq al-Kindī’;
- Risālatuhu fī al-karmi alā Abū al-Faraj ibn Najah (في الكرَّمِ الى ابو الفرج بن نجح) ‘His epistle about generosity; addressed to Abū al-Faraj ibn Najah;
- Risālatuhu al-yatīmah (اليتيمة) ‘His epistle about the unique’;
- Risālatuhu fī maut Abū Ḥarb al-Ṣaffār al-Baṣrī’ (في موت ابو حرب الصفارالبصرى) ‘His epistle about the death of Abū Ḥarb al-Ṣaffār al-Baṣrī’;
- Risālatuhu fī al-mīrāth (في الميراث) ‘His epistle about inheritance’;
- Risālatuhu fī kīmiyā’ wa-al-kīmiyā’ (في كيمنا والاكيميا) ‘His epistle about Alchemy and Alchemy; (Note: The repetition of kīmiyā’ may be an error.)
- Risālatuhu fī al-istibdād wa-al-mushāwarah fī al-ḥarb (في الاستبداد والمشاوره في الحرب) ‘His epistle about obstinate arbitrariness and consultation in War’;
- Risālatuhu al-radd ‘alā al-qawlīyah (الرد على القولية) ‘His epistle about refutation of the qawlīyah. (Note: Qawlīyah may signify “multitude” in Biblical sense, or an unidentified sect, or “mob”.)

=== Additional letters ===
Written in the handwriting of Ibn al-Furāt, near the epistles of al-Jāḥiẓ, in the Beatty MS of al-Nadīm's al-Fihrist:

- Epistle to Aḥmad ibn Isrā’īl; (احمد بن اسْرّايل)
- Epistle to Aḥmad ibn al-Munajjim, about care of speech (ḥifẓ al-lisān); (احمد بن المنجم في حفظ اللسان)
- Another epistle to Aḥmad ibn al-Munajjim; (رسالة الى احمد بن المنجم اخرى)
- Epistle to Sulaymān ibn Wahb; (سليمن بن وهب)
- Epistle to al-Ḥasan ibn Wahb; (الحسم بن وهب)
- Risālat ‘alā Muḥammad ibn ‘Abd al-Mālik fī al-ghaḍab wa-al-riḍā’ (محمد الملك في الغضب والرضاء) 'Epistle to Muḥammad ibn ‘Abd al-Mālik, about anger and satisfaction';
- al-shukr (الشكر) epistle about thanks (praise);
- al-jidd wa-al-hazl (في الجد والهزل) epistle about earnestness and joking;
- Epistle about the description of the important matters concerning the creation of the Qur’ān, about which there are also five other epistles; (في وصّف كبا حلق القران وخميم رسايل البر النضن)
- Epistle to Muḥammad al-Yazīdī; (رسالة الى محمد اليزيدى)
- Four epistles to Ibn Najāḥ Abū al-Faraj, (fl. 870) about the mind, judgment, and other things (al-‘aql al-ḥukm wa-ghayrihi); (اربع رسالى الا ابن نجاح في الغغل والحكم وغيره)
- Epistle to Abū ‘Amr Aḥmad ibn Sa’īd, to whom three other epistles were also addressed. (رسالة الة ابي عمرْه احمد بن سعيد)
- Epistle to ‘Ubayd Allāh ibn Yaḥyā ibn Khāqān; (رسالى الى عبد الله بن يحيى)
- Epistle to Ibn Abī Dā’ūd about the book “Order of the Qur’ān” (Naẓm al-Qur’ān); (رسالة التى ابن ابي داود في كتاب نظم القرْان)
- Also an epistle addressed to him about the qualities of the book “The Judicial Interpretation (al-Futyā); (Note: This and the preceding book may have been listed as works of al-Jāḥiẓ. The word ṣifāt “qualities” in this title and the fourth to follow, is probably meant, although the ā is not given in its long form.) (في صفت كتاب الفتيا)
- Epistle to Abū al-Walīd ibn Aḥmad about cauterization (al-kayy); (رسالة الى ابو الوليد ابن احمد في الكيّ)
- Epistle to ‘Abdān ibn Abī Ḥarb, to whom he also addressed two other epistles; (رسالة الى عبدان ابن حرب واليهم رساليتان)
- Epistle about the reproach for what is plagiarized; (Note: Written al-manḥūlah (“What is plagiarized”); perhaps al-manḥūl is meant.) (رسالة في غناب المنحولة)
- Epistle to Aḥmad ibn Hamdūn al-Nadīm about the qualities of a court companion (ṣifāt al-nadīm); (رسالة الت احمد بن حمدون النديم في صفت النديم)
- Epistle to Aḥmad ibn al-Mudabbir; (رسالة الى احمد بن المدبرّ)
- Ḥifẓ al-Sirr wa-al-Lisān (رسالة الى احمد المدبر؟ ابي عون حفظ السر و اللسان)
- ‘Epistle to Aḥmad ibn al-Mudabbir ‘Awn; (Note: In the marginal note in the Beatty MS the name al-Mudabbir is crossed out, and the name Abī ‘Awn inserted underneath.) about guarding a secret and use of the tongue;
- Epistle to the Commander of the Faithful al-Muntaẓar bi-Allāh Muḥammad ibn al-Ḥasan; (Note: Muḥammad ibn al-Ḥasan al-Muntaẓar bi-Allāh, Abū al-Qāsim. He was the last of the twelve official Shi‘i imams. He disappeared at Samarra, 878, was called al-Mahdi and was expected to reappear.) (رسالة الى اخدر المطنزر)
- Epistle to Aḥmad ibn al-Khaṭīb, which was the last epistle listed in the handwriting of Ibn al-Furāt.

(Note: These epistles are omitted in Yāqūt.)
