= Tafsir al-Baghawi =

- Four volume set of Tafsir al-Baghawi in Arabic (Dar al-Ma'refah edition, Lebanon).
- Author: Al-Baghawi
- Original title: تفسير البغوي
- Translator: Various
- Language: Arabic
- Subject: Qur'anic exegesis (Tafsir)
- Genre: Islamic literature
- Published: 12th century
- Publication place: Persia (modern-day Iran)
- Media type: Print (hardcover and paperback)
- Pages: Multiple volumes

Tafsīr al-Baghawī (Arabic: تفسير البغوي), also known as Ma‘ālim al-Tanzīl, is a classical Sunni tafsir (Qur'anic exegesis) by Husayn b. Mas'ūd al-Baghawī (d. 1122), written as an abridgement of Tafsir al-Thalabi by al-Tha'labī (d. 1035). It is generally classified as one of the books of narration-based tafsir, as it collects and presents many statements from the Sahabah and Tabi'oon. The book primarily relies on 11 reliable chains of narrations, which al-Baghawi mentions in the introduction to his work. It currently exists in four volumes and eight volumes in its Lebanon edition and Cairo edition respectively.

== Editions ==
- Browse Tafsir Al-Baghawi (arabic)

== See also ==
- List of Sunni books
