= Al-Baghawi =

11th-century Islamic scholar

Imam Al-Baghawī
- البغوي
- Title: Shaykh al-Islam; Muḥyī as-Sunnah; Rukn al-Din; Al-Ḥāfiẓ

Personal life
- Born: January 1042 or 1045 Baghshur
- Died: 1123 Marw al-Rudh
- Era: Islamic golden age
- Region: Khorasan
- Main interest(s): Tafsir, Hadith, Fiqh
- Notable work(s): Maʻālim at-Tanzīl; Masabih al-Sunnah
- Occupation: Scholar, Mufassir, Traditionist, Jurist

Religious life
- Religion: Islam
- Denomination: Sunni
- Jurisprudence: Shafi'i
- Creed: Ash'ari

Muslim leader
- Influenced by: Al-Shafi'i Abu Hasan al-Ash'ari Al-Tha'labi Al-Qushayri al-Qadi Husayn
- Influenced: Diya' al-Din al-Makki

Abū Muḥammad al-Ḥusayn ibn Masʻūd ibn Muḥammad al-Farrā' al-Baghawī (Persian/Arabic:ابو محمد حسین بن مسعود بغوی), also known as al-Baghawī (Arabic: البغوي) was a Persian Sunni Muslim scholar based in Khorasan. He was a prominent Quran exegete (mufassir), traditionist (muhaddith), and Shafi'i jurist (faqih). He is best known for his two major works, Maʻālim at-Tanzīl and Masabih as-Sunnah.

Al-Baghawi was known by several titles and was referred to as the "Supporter of the Religion" (Dhahīr al-Dīn) by Ibn Khallikān, who describes him as an ocean in the religious sciences. Al-Baghawī was dubbed the "Reviver of the Sunna" (Muḥyī as-Sunna) because he supposedly dreamed of the Islamic prophet telling him, “You revived my Sunna through your commentary on my ḥadīths” and this was due to compiling his work Sharḥ al-Sunna. He is also known as the "Pillar of the Religion" (Rukn al-Dīn).

== Name ==
His last name, al-Baghawī, comes from where he was born, and he is not the only scholar with this name; according to Yāqūt al-Ḥamawī (d. 626/1229), a number of scholars were born in this village and also had the same name. Al-Baghawī is also known as Ibn al-Farrāʾor al-Farrāʾ, which means “the furrier” or “son of the furrier.” Scholars disagreed as to whether this denotes his own occupation or his father's.

== Life ==
His birthdate is only mentioned by Yaqut al-Hamawi in his Muʿjam al-Buldān to be in Jumādā al-Awwal, 433/January 1042. However, subsequent sources, like Miftāḥ al-Saʿāda by Ṭāsh Kopruzādeh and al-Aʿlām by Khayr al-Din al-Zirikli, report that he was born in 436 AH. According to every source, his hometown is Baghshûr, also known as Bagh, in Khurāsān, a city that lies between Herat and Merv.

A greater understanding of the scholar's thoughts and the intellectual environment around them is made possible by knowing their educational background. The names of the academics who taught al-Baghawī and their areas of expertise are described in detail in biographical pages. His professors are spread out among different Khurāsān residents and are highly knowledgeable and diversified. al-Qāḍī Ḥusayn was al-Baghawī's main teacher, and he studied fiqh and received hadith from him as well as from many other experts. Qāḍī Ḥusayn's influence on al-Baghawī can be assessed by the many ḥadīths that he transmitted in Sharḥ al-Sunna and the frequent references to his legal judgements in al-Tahdhīb.

Although al-Baghawī's educational travels are not consistently documented, Ibn al-Subkī makes sure that al-Baghawī did not travel to Baghdad due to the lack of sources on his interactions in this area. Ibn Taghribirdi mentions that he travelled to different places to hear ḥadīths. The six other scholars mentioned as ḥadīth teachers of al-Baghawī were not all based in Baghshūr or al-Marw al-Rūdk but across Khurāsān. Some of his professors were hadith experts well-versed in adab and fiqh, including Abū ʿAmr ʿAbd al-Waḥid al-Malīḥī, Abū al-Ḥasan al-Dāwūdī, Abū Bakr Yaʿqūb al-Ṣīrafī, and Abū Bakr Muḥammad b. Haytham al-Turābī.

Abū al-Qāsim al-Qushayrī and Abū al-Ḥasan b. Yūsuf al-Juwaynī are the last two teachers of al-Baghawī who were major scholars of their respective times. Al-Qushayrī is considered a great Sufi master, but his knowledge encompassed fiqh, legal theory, ḥadīth, Quranic exegesis, and adab. Abū al-Ḥasan b. Yūsuf al-Juwaynī is a Sufi muhaddith who wrote a Sufi treatise called al-Silwa fī ʿulūm al-ṣūfiyya. He was also the elder brother of the renowned legal scholar Imam al-Haramayn. These scholars' names reappear in al-Baghawī’s ḥadīth isnads across his works. While many had teaching and adjudicating duties, the exact institutions remain unknown. Their educational backgrounds, writings, and positions give information on the Sunni scholarly scene.

Regarding the second pillar of science, al-Baghawī, which he acquired from his masters, he also studied the knowledge that earlier Muslim scholars (salāf) had left behind and drew on his own knowledge from literature. Al-Baghawī was well known for his religiosity and never taught without performing an wudu. Furthermore, it seems that he did not prioritise the wordily living because he liked to eat solely bread and began combining it with oil after his neighbours complained. He was a preacher who urged the people to follow the Sunnah and classical works. From among his pupils include Diya' al-Din al-Makki, the father of renowned polymath Fakhr al-Din al-Razi.

Al-Baghawī passed away in 516 AH in the month of Shawwal/1123 and was buried right next to his teacher al-Qadi Husayn in the Ṭāliqān cemetery in Marw al-Rudh.

== Reception ==
Taqi al-Din al-Subki said: “Very little do we see al-Baghawi choosing something unless if he researched it he would find one that was stronger than the others, besides that he could also express it concisely, this shows that he was given extraordinary intelligence, and he is careful in such matters.”

Al-Dhahabi said: “Al-Baghawī was an imam who had a lot of knowledge, a role model, an expert on hadith, Shaikh al-Islām, life of the Sunnah, and many of his compositions.”

== Works ==
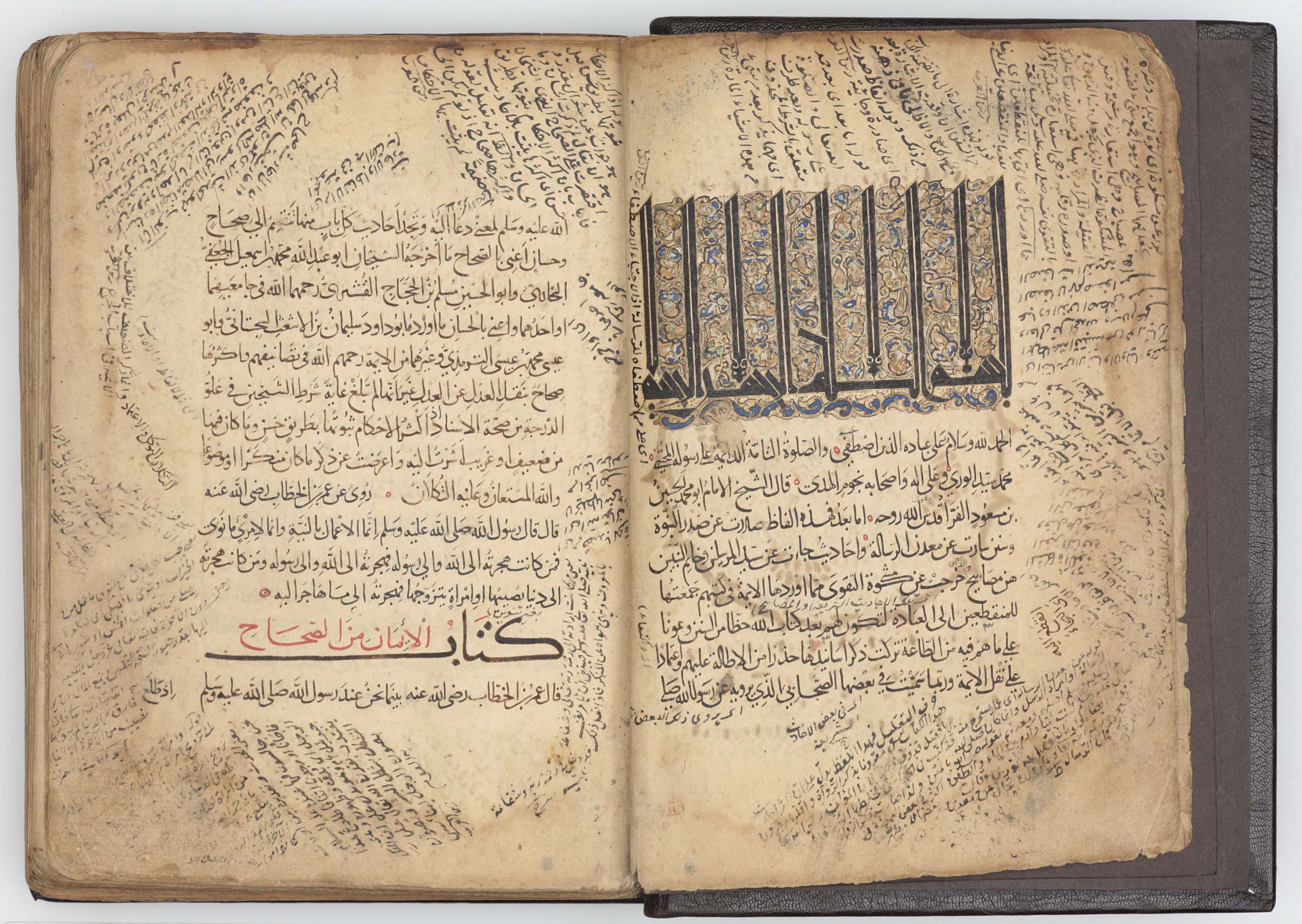
Manuscript of the Masabih al-Sunnah, Iraq or Iran, 1100AD. Khalili Collection of Islamic Art

Al-Dhahabi said: “His works were blessed and received complete acceptance due to his righteous purpose and sincere intention.”

- Tafsir al-Baghawi, also known as Maʻālim at-Tanzīl, is a classical commentary on the Quran.
- At-Tahdhīb fī Fiqh al-Imām ash-Shāfiʻī, a work on Shafi'i law and it is considered a summary of Taʿlīqa authored by al-Qadi Husayn.
- 'Sharḥ as-Sunnah
- Maṣābīḥ as-Sunnah, a famous Hadith collection.
- Al-Anwār fī Shamāʼil an-Nabī al-Mukhtār
- Al-Jamʻ bayn aṣ-Ṣaḥīḥayn
- Majmūʻah min al-Fatāwā, a fatawa collection of his teacher al-Qadi Husayn.
- Kitāb fī al-alfāẓ wa-l-sunnan
- Kashf al-manāhij wa al-tanāqīḥ fī takhrīj aḥādīth al-maṣābīḥ
- Al-Arbaʻīn Ḥadīthā

== See also ==
- List of Ash'aris

== Bibliography ==
- Nourhan Ibrahim Hassanein (July 2024). Imām al-Baghawī (d. 516/1123): Tafsīr and Sunnism during the 11th-12th Centuries in Khurāsān. American University in Cairo. p. 1-121.
- Muhammad Naufal Hakim (2024). "The Contextuality of Tafsir Ma'ālim al-Tanzīl by al-Baghawī: revisiting tradition and embracing modern values". Jurnal Semiotika-Q: Kajian Ilmu Al-Quran Dan Tafsir. 4 (1). Raden Fatah State Islamic University: 88-106. doi:10.19109/7gthhn08 (inactive 1 July 2025). ISSN 2809-0500.
