= List of tafsir works =

Commentary and explication of Islamic holy text

The following is a list of tafsir works. Tafsir is a body of commentary and explication, aimed at explaining the meanings of the Quran, the central religious text of Islam. Tafsir can broadly be categorized by its affiliated Islamic schools and branches and the era it was published, classic or modern.

According to American scholar Samuel Ross, there are 2,700 Quran commentaries extant in manuscript form, and 300 commentaries have been published. Considering that around 96% of the Arabic-language manuscripts remain unstudied, Ross argues that "by extrapolation there may be thousands of additional commentaries still waiting to be discovered."

== Early tafsir ==
=== Arabic ===
- Tanwir al-Miqbas (Tafsir Ibn Abbas) attributed to Abd Allah ibn Abbas (d. 68/687) although there is a dispute about its authenticity (as stated by Islamic Scholars)
- Tafsir al-Kabir (The Great Interpretation) by Muqatil ibn Sulayman (80-150AH). The first full tafsir attributed to Muqatil ibn Sulayman ibn Bashiral-Balkhi.ibn sulayman, muqatel (2021). الوجوه والنظائر في القرآن الكريم. Beirut: دار الكتب العلمية. p. 400. ISBN 2745198246.
- Tafsir Ibn Jurayj by Ibn Jurayj (80-150 AH). Published for the first time in 2019, after a partial manuscript of the work was identified.
- Tafsir Saʿīd ibn Bashīr al-Shāmī al-Dimashqī (?-168AH). An excerpt of two and a half folio of his Tafsir was found in 2020.
- Ma’ani al-Qur’an (The Meaning of The Qur’an) by Abu Zakaria al-Farra (207AH).
- Tafsir Sufyan al-Thawri by Sufyan al-Thawri (161 AH/778 CE)

=== English ===
Original work

- "The Message of the Qur’ān" by Muhammad Asad (Leopold Weis) 1940.
- "The Meaning of the Glorious Quran" by Marmaduke Pickthall 1929
- "The Koran: Commonly Called the Alkoran of Mohammed-with large commentary" by George Sale.
- "Quran to English" by Arab born American Talal Itani.

Translation

- Tafsir Ibn 'Abbas: Great Commentaries of the Holy Qur'an translated by Mokrane Guezzou. Fons Vitae, Royal Aal al-Bayt Institute for Islamic Thought.
- "The Meaning of the Glorious Quran" by Marmaduke Pickthall 1929
- "The Koran: Commonly Called the Alkoran of Mohammed, by George Sale

== Sunni ==
=== Arabic ===
- "Tafsir al-Tabari" by at-Tabari, a very popular tafsir, along with those of Qurtubi, Baghawi, Sa'di, ibn Kathir, and al-Jalalayn.
- "tafseer al-Qurtubi, by al-Qurtubi. al-Qurtubi, Muhammad al-ansari (1964). تفسير القرطبي، الجامع لأحكام القرآن, tafseer al-Qurtubi. Cairo: دار الكتب المصرية. ISBN 978-9953-27-020-3.
- "tafseer e saadi تفسير السعدي : تيسير الكريم الرحمن في تفسير القرآن" by al-Sa'adi ISBN 978-603-501-359-8.
- "Tafseer al-Tha'labi" by al-Tha'labi.
- Tafsir Muqatel by Muqatil ibn Sulayman (80-150AH). The first full tafsir attributed to Muqatil ibn Sulayman ibn Bashir al-Balkhi.ibn Sulayman, Muqatel (2021). الوجوه والنظائر في القرآن الكريم. Beirut: دار الكتب العلمية. p. 400. ISBN 2745198246.
- "Tafseer Ibn Ashur/Tafsir al-Tahrir wa'l-Tanwir/Liberation and enlightenment تفسير التحرير والتنوير" by Muhammad ibn Ashur
- An-Nukat wa al-'Uyun by Al-Mawardi (d. 450/1058) — the author was an Islamic jurist of the Shafi'i school.
- Al-Muharrar al-Wajiz (The Concise Record), commonly known as Tafsir ibn 'Atiyyah after its author, Ibn Atiyyah (d. 541 or 546AH), a Maliki judge from al-Andalus. This Quranic commentary is popular in North Africa.
- Zad al-Masir Fi Ilm al-Tafsir by the Hanbali Ash'ari polymath Abu'l-Faraj ibn al-Jawzi (d. 597AH).
- Mafatih al-Ghayb (The Keys to Unseen) by Fakhr al-Din al-Razi (1149—1209 CE/606 AH) also known as Tafsir al-Kabir (The Great Exegesis)
- Tafsir al-Qur’an Al-'Azim by Izz al-Din ibn 'Abd al-Salam
- Anwar al-Tanzil wa Asrar al-Ta'wil by Al-Baydawi (d. 685 AH/1286 CE), also famous as Tafsir al-Baydawi — a shortened version of Al-Kashshaf, with Mu’tazili references altered; printed in two volumes. In Turkey it is often published with marginal notes by a Turkish scholar called 'al-Qunawi' in seven volumes.
- Madarik al-Tanzil wa Haqa'iq al-Ta'wil by Abu al-Barakat al-Nasafi (d. 710)
- Tafsir ibn Kathir (Tafsir al-Quran al-Azim) by Ibn Kathir (1301—1373 CE/ 774 AH). A summary of the earlier interpretation by al-Tabari. Available online. It has been summarized as Mukhtasar Tafsir Ibn Kathir in 3 volumes by Muhammad 'Ali As-Sabuni.
- Lubab al-Ta'wil Fi Ma'ani at-Tanzil by Ala al-Din al-Khazin (d. 741), which is an abridgement of Ma’alimal-Tanzil by Hasan been Mas’ud al-Baghawi.
- Futuhal-Ghawyb Fi Kashfi 'an Qina'i-r-Rawyb (Sharh 'ala Al-Kashshaf) by Shaeawfal-Din al-Husain Ibn 'Abdullahi-tt-Twibi (743 AH)
- Al-Bahr al-Muhit by Abu Hayyan al-Gharnati (d. 745 AH/1344 CE) is a linguistic commentary on the Qur’an primarily from the standpoint of Arabic grammar and rhetoric.
- Bada'i' al-Tafsir and At-Tibbyanu Fi Aymani al-Qur'an by Ibn Qayyim al-Jawziyya (d. 751 AH/1350 CE)
- At-Tahsil li-'Ulumi al-Tanzil by Ibn Juzayy (758 AH/1357 CE)
- Tafsir al-Khazin by Ala al-Din al-Khazin
- Nazm al-Durar fi Tanasub al-Ayi wa al-Suwar (Tafsir al-Biqa'i) by Burhanuddin Ibrahim bin Umar al-Biqa'i
- Jalaluddin al-Suyuti completed:
- Fath al-Rahman Fi Tafsir al-Qur'an by Mujir al-Din (d. 927 AH) - the exegete was a Palestinian judge, historian and Hanbali jurist from Jerusalem. Not to be confused with the Persian translation and commentary written by the Muhaddith Shah Waliullah Dehlawi.
- Irshad al-'Aql as-Salim ila Mazaya al-Qur’an al-Karim by Ebussuud Efendi (d.951 AH/1505 CE). Also known as Tafsir Abi Sa’ud.
- Al-Sirawju al-Munir by Al-Khatib al-Shirbini .
- Anwar al-Qur'an wa Asrar al-Furqan by Ali al-Qari, 1004AH, 5 Volumes, published by Daral-Kutub Ilmiyah, Beirut, Lebanon.
- Al-Wahidi's three exegetical works: Tafsir al-Wajiz (2 Volumes), Tafsir al-Wasit (4 Volumes), Tafsir al-Basit (25 Volumes)

Legal Tafsir

- Ahkam al-Qur’an ('The Commands of the Quran') by Al-Jaṣṣās (d. 370 AH/981 CE). Based on the legal rulings of the Hanafi school of Islamic law. This was published in three volumes and remains popular amongst the Hanafis of India, the Middle East and Turkey.
- Ahkam al-Qur’an ('The Commands of the Quran') by Abu Bakr ibn al-Arabi (d.543 AH/1148 CE). The author is also known as 'Qadi ibn al-Arabi' (ibn Arabi, the judge) to distinguish him from the famous Sufi Ibn Arabi. He was a jurist from Andalusia (Muslim Spain) His interpretation has been published in three volumes and contains commentary on the legal rulings of the Quran according to the Maliki school.
- Al-Jami' li-Ahkam al-Qur’an ('The collection of Qur’anic Injunctions') by Al-Qurtubi (1214—1273 CE/671 AH), the famous Maliki Ash'ari jurist of Cordoba, in Andalusia. This 10-volume tafsir is a commentary on the Qur’anic verses dealing with legal issues. Although the author was a Maliki, he also presents the legal opinions of other major schools of Islamic jurisprudence; thus it is popular with jurists from all of the schools of Islamic law. One volume of this tafsir has been translated into English by Aisha Bewley. Available online.
- Nukat al-Qur’an al-Dallah ala al-Bayan by Al-Qassab (d. 360AH/970CE) a commentary primarily from the viewpoint of applied Islamic law.

Partial and Unfinished Tafsir

- Ma'ani Al-Qur'an al-Karim (unfinished) by Abu Jaʿfar an-Nahhas (d. 338 AH/949 CE) - It contains tafsir from Surah Al-Fatihah to Surah Al-Fath. It has been edited and annotated by Muhammad 'Ali As-Sabina.
- Al-Bustanu Fi I'rawbi Mushkilati al-Qur'an (unfinished) by Ahmad Ibn Ahnaf Abi Bakr Al-Yamani Ibn 'Umar Al-Hanbali (717 AH).
- Rawa'i' al-Tafsir by Ibn Rajab (795 AH)
- Tafsir Ibn 'Arawfah (unfinished) by Ibn Arafa (d. 800/803 AH/ 1400 CE)
- Tafsir Ibn Kamal Basha (unfinished) by Ibn Kemal (d. 940 AH/1536 CE)
- At-Tafsirat al-Ahmadiyyah Fi Bayani al-ayati-sh-Shar'iyyah by Mulla Ahmad Jiwan (d. 1130 AH / 1718 CE). This is the Hanafi tafsir of only those ayat which are concerned with matters of Fiqh.
- Mushkilat al-Qur’an by Anwar Shah Kashmiri, edited with references and one of the introductions by Ahmad Bijnuri, and another introduction by the author's favourite student Muhammad Yusuf Banori. The book predominantly in Arabic but passages in Persian also appear throughout the work. The main objective for undertaking to write this work was to interpret only those verses of the Quran which are generally considered to be difficult to understand. A special feature of this particular work is that the author has, in addition, set aside 190 verses that, in his opinion, required further discussion and repeated consideration. Published posthumously in Maligaon, Surat, Gujarat, India, by Majlis al-'Ilmi in 1974.

Modern

- Hashiyah ala Tafsir al-Qadi al-Baydawi by Ibn 'Abidin (d. 1252 AH/1836 CE)
- Tafsir Ash-Sharawi by Muhammad Metwali Alsharawi (1911—1998), a famous Egyptian scholar.
- Al-tafsir al-waset by Muhammad Tantawy (28 October 1928 — 10 March 2010), Grand Imam of Al-Azhar
- al-Tafsīr al-Bayānī Iil-Qurʾān al-Karīm by Aisha Abd al-Rahman (1913 – 1998), first work written by a woman.
- Fi Zilal al-Quran ('In the Shade of the Quran') by Sayyid Qutb (1906—1966)
- Muhammad Ali al-Sabuni completed:
1. Safwat al-Tafasir
2. At-Tafsir al-Wadwih al-Muyassar
3. Rawa'i' al-Bayan Tafsir ayati al-Ahkam mina al-Qur'an
- Minhat Al-Jalil Fi Bayan ma Fi Ma’alimal-Tanzil by Aziz-ul-Rahman Usmani (d. 1928)
- Tafsir al-Qur'an bi-Kalamal-Rahman by Sanaullah Amritsari
- Ruh al-Ma'ani (The Spirit of Meanings on the Exegesis of the Sublime Qur’an) by Mahmud al-Alusi (d.1270 AH/1854 CE)
- Mawahib al-Rahman Fi Tafsir al-Qur'an by Abdul Karim Mudarris (1980 CE) - the mufti of Iraq and a Shafi'i jurist
- Al-Anwaral-Muttaqin (Asayyid al-Tafasir) - This is the combination of five Tafsirs by six Ash'ari scholars Fakhr al-Din al-Razi, Shams/Shahabal-din AhmadIbn Khawlil Al-Khauli/Khau'i Ad-Dimashqi/Najjmal-Din Ahmad Ibn Muhammad Ibn Abal-Hazm Al-Makhzumi Al-Qawmuli Al-Missri, Al-Qurtubi, Ibn Kathir, Ebussuud Efendi, and Mahmud al-Alusi, edited by Anwar Shah Kashmiri, Muhammad Yusuf Banori, and Taqi Usmani
- Aysar al-Tafasir li Kalami al-'Aliyyi al-Kabir by Abu Bakr al-Jazaeri
- al-Iklil ʻala Madarik al-tanzil wa-ḥaqaʼiq al-taʼwil lil-Imam al-Nasafi by Muhammad Abdul Haq bin Shah al-Hindi al-Hanafi (d. 1915 AD) - A commentary of An-Nasafi's Tafsir, with elements ofTafsir al-Baydawi by al-Baydawi and Tafsir Al-Kashshaf by Al-Zamakhshari, which is famous for its linguistic analysis, some of which al-Baydawi and then an-Nasafi amended and some omitted.
- Nahw tafsir mawdu`i li-suwar al-Qur'an al-Karim by Muhammad al-Ghazali
- Tafsir Al-Nabulsi by Mohammed Rateb al-Nabulsi
- Al-Mo'jamul Mufahras Li Alfadh Al-Qur'an Al-Kareem by Mohammad Fuad Abdul Baqi
- al-Tafsir al-Bayan lil Quran al-Karim by Aisha Abd al-Rahman
- Nazarat fi Kitab Allah by Zaynab al-Ghazali
- Al-Mubasir al-Nur al-Quran by Nayla Hashem Sabri
- Taysir al-Tafsir by Fawkiya Ibrahim al-Shirbini

=== Persian ===
Translations

- Tafsir-e-Tabari: a 10th-century translation of the Tafsir al-Tabari in Persian.
- Tafsir-e-Nasafi: an 11th-century translation and tafsir by Abu Hafs Umar an-Nasafi.

Original

- Mawaheb-e-'Aliyya (Tafsir al-Husaini): by Husayn Kashifi
- Mushkilat al-Qur’an by Anwar Shah Kashmiri, edited with references and one of the introductions by Ahmad Bijnuri, and another introduction by the author's favourite student Muhammad Yusuf Banori. This partial commentary is predominantly in Arabic but passages in the Persian language also appears throughout the work. The main objective for undertaking to write this work was to interpret only those verses of the Holy Quran which are generally considered to be difficult to understand. A special feature of this particular work is that the author has, in addition, set aside 190 verses that, in his opinion, required further discussion and repeated consideration. Published posthumously in Maligaon, Surat, Gujarat, India, by Majlis al-'Ilmi in 1974.

=== Urdu ===
Original

- Tibyan ul-Quran by Ghulam Rasool Saeedi is the most comprehensive and detailed Tafsir of Quran in Urdu it contains complete, direct and full references (it is available in 12 volumes in Urdu)
- Tafseer e Siddiqui by (bahrululoom muhammad abdul quadeer siddiqui hazrat)
- Tafsir Naeemi (19 Volumes) by Mufti Ahmad Yar Khan Naeemi
- Tafsir Noor ul-Irfan by Mufti Ahmad Yar Khan Naeemi
- Khaza'in ul-Irfan by Naeem-ud-Deen Muradabadi
- Bayan al-Quran by Ashraf Ali Thanwi
- Maarif al-Quran by Idris Kandhlawi
- Dhakhirat al-Janan Fi Fahmi al-Qur’an by Muhammad Sarfaraz Khan Safdar
- Jamalayn Fi Sharh Tafsir al-Jalalayn by Muhammad Jamal Bulandshahri Deobandi
- Kamalayn Sharh Tafsir al-Jalalayn by Muhammad Na'im Deobandi
- Fath al-Mannan also known as "Tafsir-e-Haqqani" by Abu Muhammad 'Abdal-Haqq Haqani
- Ashraf al-Tafasir compiled by Taqi Usmani from the Mawa'iz-e-Ashrafiyah of Ashraf Ali Thanwi
- Khulasawt al-Bayan by Muhammad 'Isa Allahabadi
- Tafseer-e-Usmani by Shabbir Ahmad Usmani
- Ma'ariful Quran by Muhammad Shafi
- Ma'ariful Quran by Muhammad Idris Kandhlawi
- Tafseer-e-Majidi by Abdul Majid Daryabadi
- Anwarul Bayan by Ashiq Ilahi Bulandshahri
- Anwaral-Qur'an by Abal-Kalam Ma'sum
- Ubaidullah Sindhi wrote Tafsir-e-Quran and Tafsir-e-Mehmud
- Tafsir-e-Usmani by Mahmud al-Hasan and Shabbir Ahmad Usmani
- Tafsir-e-Basirat-e-Qur'an by Muhammad Asif Qasmi
- Hidayatal-Qur'an by 'Uthman Kashifal-Hashmi Rajupuri and Saeed Ahmad Palanpuri
- Tauzihal-Qur'an (asan Tarjumah-e-Qur'an) by Taqi Usmani
- Guldastah-e-Tafsir by 'Abdul-Qayyum Muhajir Madni
- Ruhal-Qur'an by Muhammad Na'im
- Tadabbur-i-Quran by Amin Ahsan Islahi
- Ma’alimal-'Irfan Fi Durusi al-Qur’an by 'Abdul Hamid-Khan Sawati
- Tafhim al-Quran by Abul A'la Maududi
- Al Bayan by Javid Ahmad Ghamidi.
- Sirat ul-Jinan fi Tafsir il-Quran (Way to heaven) by Qasim Al-Qadri
- Bayan al-Qur'an by Israr Ahmad
- Zikrul-Lil-alamin by Jalaluddin Qasmi

Translations

- Dur al-Manthur by the famous Shafi'i scholar Al-Suyuti (d. 911 AH/1505 CE).
- Tarjumat al-Qur'an by Rafiuddin Deobandi
- Tafsir Al-Hawi -Taqrir-e-Anwar al-Tanzil by Fakhral-Hasan Deobandi
- Fadl-e-Rahmani by Anzar Shah Kashmiri
- Tafsir al-Jalalayn by Jalaluddin al-Mahalli (in 1459), and was subsequently completed, in the same style, by his student, the famous Shafi'i scholar Al-Suyuti (d. 911 AH/1505 CE), translated by Aziz-ul-Rahman Usmani

Partial and Unfinished Tafsir

- Ahkam Al-Qur’an (5 Volumes) by Muhammad Ashraf Ali Thanwi, ' Zafar Ahmad Usmani, Jamil Ahmad Thanawi, Muhammad Idris Kandhlawi, and Muhammad Shafi Uthmani, with introduction by Taqi Usmani - the 2nd and the 4th Manzil is left to be written.
- Tarjuman al-Quran by Abul Kalam Azad
- Ma'alimal-Qur'an by Muhammad 'Ali As-Swiddiqi Kandhlawi

=== Bengali ===
Original

- Qur'an Bangla Anubad (কুরআন বাংলা অনুবাদ), by Dr. Zohurul Hoque (1986). Available online
- Tafsir Zakaria by Abubakar Muhammad Zakaria. Available online.
- Tafsir-e-Haqqani) by Shamsul Haque Faridpuri (completed but not fully published yet) - only the first and last Juz' were published but the author completed the manuscript of the Tafsir in approximately 16000 pages and urged his students to publish it but no one has taken up the task of the continuation of the publication yet).
- Nural-Qur'an by Muhammad Aminal-Islam (30 volumes) (1981-1998)
- Tafsir al-Quran by Delwar Hossain Sayidi

Translations

- Ahkam al-Qur’an ('The Commands of the Quran') by Al-Jaṣṣās
- Tafsir Ibn Kathir translated by Akhtar Faruq.
- Tafsir Ibn Kathir translated by Mujibur-Rahman
- Tafsir al-Jalalayn with its Urdu commentaries Jamalayn and Kamalayn by 'Abdal-Ghawffar Shahpuri, Amiral-Islam Faridabadi, and Habibal-Rahman Hobiganji.
- Bayanal-Qur'an by Ashraf Ali Thanwi
- Tafsir-e-Usmani by Mahmud al-Hasan Deobandi and ' Shabir Ahmad Usmani
- Tafsir-e-Majidi by Abdul Majid Daryabadi
- Ma'ariful Quran by Muhammad Shafi. Translated from Urdu to Bengali by Muhiuddin Khan. Fully available online.
- Anwar al-Qur'an by Abal-Kalam Ma'sum, translated by Muhammad Mustawfa
- Tauzih al-Qur'an by Taqi Usmani (Introduction by the author's student, Muhammad Abdul Malek) translated by Abal-Bashar Muhammad Saifal-Islam.
- Fi Zilal al-Qur'an by Masihuzzaman Falahi Nadvi, Lar, Deoria Uttar Pradesh
- Tafhim ul Quran by Abul A'la Maududi. Translated from Urdu by Abdul Mannan Talib. Available online.
- "Shohoj Bangla Quran" (সহজ বাংলা কুরআন) Translated by Engr M Alauddin, 2023. Publisher: Mowla Brothers, Dhaka, Bangladesh.

=== English ===
Original

- The Noble Quran: Meaning With Explanatory Notes by Taqi Usmani
- The Majestic Quran: An English Rendition of Its Meanings translation and commentary by Nureddin Uzunoglu, Ali Ozek, Tevfik Rüştü Topuzoğlu, and Mehmet Maksutoğlu

Translations

- Noor ul-Irfan by Mufti Ahmad Yar Khan Naeemi
- Tafsir Ibn Kathir by Ibn Kathir is available as:
1. Tafsir ibn Kathir: The Exegesis of the Grand Holy Qur'an translated by Muhammad Mahdi Al-Sharif. Daral-Kutub 'Ilmiyah, Beirut, Lebanon 2006.
2. Tafsir Ibn Kathir translated by Safiur-Rahman Al Mubarakpuri and team, Darussalam Publications.
3. Tafsir Ibn Kathir (Abridged) translated by Muhammad Anis Gad Khalil, Dar al-Manarah
- Qur’an Made Easy by Shabir Ahmad Usmani, Afzal Husen Elias, Ismail Ibrahim, and Ismail Khathrada.
- Tafsir-e-Uthmani by Mahmud Hasan Deobandi and Shabir Ahmad Usmani has been translated as:
1. The Glorious Qur'an based on the Tafsir-e-'Uthmani translated and edited by the teachers of Madrasah Ayesha Siddiqua, Karachi. Al-Bushra Publishers
2. Tafsir-e-Uthmani translated by Mohammad Ashfaq Ahmad, Idara Impex, India
- Ma'ariful Quran by Muhammad Shafi. Translated from Urdu to English. Fully available online.
- Illuminating Discourses on the Noble Qur’an by Ashiq Ilahi Bulandshahri, translated into English by Ismail Ebrahim, and edited by Ismail Khathrada and Afzal Hoosen Elias
- Tafhim al-Quran by Abul A'la Maududi translated as Towards Understanding the Qur'an
- Nahw tafsir mawdu`i li-suwar al-Qur'an al-Karim by Muhammad al-Ghazali has been translated as
1. A Thematic Commentary on the Qur’an translated by A.A Shamis, The International Institute of Islamic Thought (IIIT)
2. Journey Through The Qur'an: The Content and Context of the Suras translated by Aisha Bewley
- Tafsir al-Qur’an (also known as: Tafsir-e-Majidi) by Abdul Majid Daryabadi
- Tafsir al-Tabari by al-Tabari has been partially translated by Scott Lucas as Selections from The Comprehensive Exposition of the Interpretation of the Verses of the Qur'an in two volumes, Islamic Texts Society
- Fi Zilal al-Qur'an by Sayyid Qutb has been translated as In the Shade of the Quran by Adil Salahi and A.A Shamis, Islamic Foundation
- The Noble Quran: Meaning With Explanatory Notes by Taqi Usmani
- Tadabbur-e-Qur'an has been translated as Pondering over the Qur'an by Mohammad Saleem Kayani. Incomplete, in two volumes, Islamic Book Trust
- Tafsir al-Jalalayn by Jalal ud Din Suyuti and Jalal ud Din al Mahalli has been translated as:
1. Tafsir al-Jalalayn: Complete English Translation by Aisha Bewley, Dar al-Taqwa
2. Tafsir al Jalayan: Great Commentaries of the Holy Qur'an translated by Feras Hamza, Royal Aal al-Bayt Institute for Islamic Thought, Fons Vitae
- Tafsir al-Kabir by al-Razi has been partially translated as The Great Exegesis: al-Tafsir al-Kabir by Sohaib Saeed. Royal Aal al-Bayt Institute for Islamic Thought, Islamic Texts Society

=== Sindhi ===
- Tafsir Al-Maqam Al-Mahmud by Ubaidullah Sindhi.
- Tafsir Surah Saba by Ghulam Mustafa Qasmi.
- Tafsir Sahalul Bayan by Mufti Abdul Wahab Chachar.

=== Kurdish ===
- Nami Tafsir by Abdul Karim Mudarris (1980), the mufti and Shafi'i jurist of Iraq
- Tafsiri Raman by Ahmad Kaka Mahmood, a Kurdish scholar from Halabja

=== Malay ===
- Tarjuman al-Mustafid by Abd al-Rauf al-Sinkili (1615–1693)
- Tafsir At Tibbyan by Abdul Hadi Awang

=== Indonesian ===
- Tafsir Qur'an Karim by Mahmud Yunus (1899–1982)
- Tafsir al-Azhar by Hamka. Published in 10 volumes.
- Tafsir Al-Mishbah by Quraish Shihab
- Tafsir Rahmat by Oemar Bakry (1916-)
- Tafsir Al-Qur'anul Majid An-Nur by Muhammad Hasbi Ash-Shiddieqy (1904–1975)
- Tafsir Al-Bayan by Muhammad Hasbi Ash-Shiddieqy
- Tafsir Al-Lubab by Quraish Shihab. Published in 4 volumes.
- Tafsir Qur'an by Zainuddin Hamidy and Fachruddin HS
- Tafsir Raudhatul Irfan fi Ma'rifat Al-Qur'an by Ahmad Sanusi
- Tafsir Al-Furqan by Ahmad Hassan
- Tafsīr al-Qur’ān al-Karīm by Abdul Halim Hasan (1901-1969), Zainal Arifin Abbas and Abdul Rahim Haitami

=== Javanese ===
- Serat Al-Fatekah by an anonymous Surakartan palace writer
- STafsir Qur'an Jawen by Bagus Ngarofah
- Tafsir Al-Iklil fi Ma'ani Tanzil by Misbah Mustafa. Published in 10 volumes.
- Tafsir Al-Ibriz Lima'rifati Tafsiril Qur'an bi Lughati al-Jawa by Bisri Musthafa
- Taj al-Muslimin min Kalami Rabbi al’Alamin by Misbah Mustafa
- Faidl al-Rahman by Saleh Darat as-Samarani (1820-1903)
- Tafsir Al-Mahalli by Mujab Mahalli

=== Sundanese ===
- Tafsir Raudhatul Irfan fi Ma'rifat Al-Qur'an by Ahmad Sanusi. Published in 2 volumes.

=== Madurese ===
- Al-Qur’an al-Karim Nurul Huda by Mudhar Tamim

=== Buginese ===
- Tafsir Al-Munir by Anre Gurutta Daud Ismail

=== Turkish ===
- Risale-i Nur by Said Nursî (1878—1960) written mainly in Turkish, is a large work, with four main volumes. It consists of extensive exegesis of certain verses and explanation of the fundamentals of how to approach the Quran. It especially explains the verses that 21st century people need most. In other words, it studies the verses about the six articles of belief of Islam such as believing in God and the day of judgment. It also gives logical answers to the questions asked by Atheists. This work is written in a more accessible style to the general public and is translated into 52 languages.
- Elmalılı Tefsir by Elmalılı Muhammed Hamdi Yazır. Published in 10 volumes, it remains one of the most popular commentaries in Turkish.
- Okuyucu Tefsiri by Semra Kürün Çekmegil - The first tafsir written by a female Turkish scholar
- Kur’an Tahlili: Arapça Gramer Işığında Sözlük-Meal-Tefsir by Necla Yasdıman

== Sunni Sufi ==
=== Arabic ===
- Tafsir al-Qur'an al-Azim by Sahl al-Tustari (d. 283/897)
- Tafsir al-Mahaimi by Makhdoom Ali Mahimi
- Ruh al-Bayan by Ismail Hakki Bursevi (1653—1725 CE). A ten-volume Arabic work by the founder of the Hakkiyye Jelveti Sufi Order from Turkey.
- Haqa'iq al-tafsir by Abu Abd Rahman al-Sulami (d. 412/1021)
- Ara'is al-Bayan fi haqa'iq al-Koran by Abu Mohammad Shirazi (d. 606/1209)
- Bahr al-Madid ('The Immense Ocean') by Ahmad ibn Ajiba (1747—1809 CE), generally known as Tafsir ibn Ajibah — an 6/8 volume work by a Moroccan Sheikh of the Darqarwi branch of the Shadhili Order of Sufism.
- Laṭā'if al-Isharat bi-Tafsir al-Qur'ān by Al-Qushayri
- Al-Mohit al-azam by Haydar Amuli that was completed around 1375 or 1376 CE
- Tafsir al-Mazhari by Qadi Thanaullah Panipati
- Ghara'ib al-Qur'an wa Ragha'ib al-Furqan by Nizam al-Din al-Nisaburi (d. 728/1328)
- Tafsir Safi by Mohsen Fayz Kashani (?? – 1680 CE)
- Tafasir al-Quran (Philosophical Exegesis) by Mulla Sadra (1571/72 – 1635/40 CE / 980 – 1050 AH)
- Bayan al-Sa‘ada (19th century) by Sultan Alishah
- 'Ara'is al-bayan fi ḥaqa'iq al-Qur'an (Brides of Elucidation in the Truths of the Quran) by Ruzbihan Baqli
- al-Tawilat al-Najmiyah by Najamuddin Daya (d. 654/1261) and Ala al-Dawla Simnani (d. 736/1330)

=== Bengali ===
Translation

- Tafsir-e-Mazhari by Qadi Thanaullah Panipati, translated by Mamunal-Rawshid

=== English ===
Original

- The Qur'an with Annotated Interpretation in Modern English by Ali Ünal - Ünal is a member of the Gülenist movement.

Translations

- Noor ul-Irfan by Mufti Ahmad Yar Khan Naeemi
- Asrar al-Tanzil by Ameer Muhammad Akram Awan (from Urdu)
- Laṭā'if al-Isharat bi-Tafsir al-Qur'ān has been partially translated as Abu'l-Qasim Al-Qushayri's Lata'if Al-Isharat: Subtleties of The Allusions by Kristin Zahra Sands, Dar Ul Thaqafah
- A Sufi Commentary on the Qur'an: Ta'wilat al-Qur'an by Abd al-Razzaq Al-Kashani, translated by Khalid Williams. The Royal Aal al-Bayt Institute for Islamic Thought, Islamic Texts Society
- Tafsir Al-Tustari: Great Commentaries on the Holy Qur’an translated by Annabel and Ali Keeler, The Royal Aal al-Bayt Institute for Islamic Thought, Fons Vitae

=== Persian ===
- Kashf al-Asrar by Rashid al-Din Maybudi
- Fath al-Aziz: an 18th-century tafsir in Persian by Shah Abdul Aziz Dehlavi, son of Shah Waliullah Dehlawi. (A large part of this Tafsir was lost in 1847 CE along with his commentary on Sunan Abu Dawud.)

=== Sindhi ===
- Ahsan ul Bayan by Allama Muhammad Idris Dahiri in 9 volumes.

=== Urdu ===
Translations

- Tafsir-e-Mazhari by Qadi Thanaullah Panipati (from Arabic)
- Tafsir-e-Jawahir-e-'Azizi (Translation of Fath al-'Azizi) by Shah Abdul Aziz Muhaddith Dehlavi (from Persian)

Original

- Tafsir e Naeemi (19 Volumes published as of 8 April 2024) by Mufti Ahmad Yar Khan Naeemi
- Tafsir Zia ul Quran by Muhammad Karam Shah al-Azhari.
- Amir Muhammad Akram Awan wrote:
1. Akram al-Tafasir
2. Asrar al-Tanzil
- Bayan al-Quran by Ashraf Ali Thanwi.
- Sabq al-ghayat fi nasaq al-ayat by Ashraf Ali Thanwi.
- Hawashi-e-Qur'an Majid by Shah 'Abdul Qadir Dihlawi and Ahmad 'Ali Lahori

== Sunni Salafi ==
=== Arabic ===
- Fath al-Qadir by Muhammad ash-Shawkani.
- Tafsir As-Sa'di by Abdul-Rahman al-Sa'di

=== Bengali ===
- Tafsir al-Quran by Muhammad Asadullah Al-Ghalib
- Tafsir-Aini 1-15 Parah/Juz' (Volume-I & II) explained by Ainul Bari Aliavi. Published by Sufia Prakashani, Kolkata, India. ISBN 978-81-941079-1-0 (volume-I) & ISBN 978-81-941079-2-7 (Volume-II).

=== English ===
Original

- Tafsir Ishraq Al-Ma'ani (1997-2007) by Syed Iqbal Zaheer. In eight volumes, this tafsir summarizes the exegesis of the most prominent writings of Muslim scholars from Tabari to Sayyid Qutb from a Salafi perspective.

Translation

- Tafseer as-Sa'di by Abdul-Rahman al-Sa'di, translated by Nasiruddin al-Khattab and edited by Huda Khattab, International Islamic Publishing House (from Arabic)
- Ahasanul Bayan by Hafiz Salahuddin Yusuf, translated by Mohammad Kamal Myshkat, Dar-us-Salam Publications (from Urdu)

=== Urdu ===
- Ahasanul Bayan by Hafiz Salahuddin Yusuf

== Twelver Shia ==
=== Arabic ===
Classic

- Tafsir Qomi by Ali Ibn Ibrahim Qomi (d. 919 CE)
- Tafsir Ayyashi by Mohammad ibn Masoud Ayyashi (d. 932 CE)
- Tafsir Furat Kufi by Furat Ibn Furat Ibn Ibrahim al-Kufi. (d. 964 CE)
- Tafsir al-Nu'mani by Muhammad b. Ibrahim al-Nu'mani (d. 971 CE)
- Al-Tibbyan Fi Tafsir al-Quran by Shaikh Tusi (995 – 1067 CE)
- Rawd al-Jinan by Abu al-Futuh al-Razi (d. 1131 CE / 525-526 A.H.)
- Majma' al-Bayan by Shaykh Tabarsi (1073 – 1153 CE)
- Zubdat al-tafasir by Molla Fathollah Kashani (d. 1580 CE / 988 A.H.)
- Al-Burhan Fi Tafsir al-Quran by Syed Hashimal-Bahrani (d. 1696 CE)
- Tafsir Nur al-Thaqalayn by Abd al-Ali ibn Juma Arusi (d. 1701 CE)

Jurisprudential

- Zubdat al-bayan by Mohaghegh Ardabili (d. 1585 CE / 993 A.H.)
- Fiqh al-Qur'an by al-Sayyid Qutb al-Rawandi (d. 1177 CE / 573 A.H.)

Partial and Unfinished Tafsir

- Tafsir Imam Ja'far al-Sadiq collection of hadiths reportedly narrated by Imam Ja'far al-Sadiq (a.s.) (83 – 148 A.H.).
- Tafsir Imam Hasan Askari attributed to Imam Hasan al-Askari (a.s.) (232 - 260 A.H.)

Modern

- Tafsir Shobar by Abdullah Alavi Hosseini Mosavi. (d. 1827 CE / 1242 A.H.)
- Mawahib al-Rahman Fi Tafsir al-Qur'an by Abd al-A'la al-Sabziwari (1910 – 1993 CE)
- Al-Bayan Fi Tafsir al-Quran by Abu al-Qasim al-Khoei (1899 - 1992 CE)
- Tafsir al-Mizan by Muhammad Husayn Tabataba'i (1904 – 1981 CE). explanation of Quranic verses with the help of other relevant verses. English version is available as well.
- Al-Forghan fi Tafsir al-Quran by Mohammad Sadeqi Tehrani (1926 – 2011 CE)
- Tafsir Hedayat (Min Hadi Al-Quran) by Mohammad Taqi al-Modarresi (b. 1945 CE – Present)

Translations

- Al-Amthal fi Tafsir al-Qur'an by Naser Makarem Shirazi (1927 CE – Present) (translated of Tafsir Nemuneh from Persian to Arabic).
- Nafahat al-Quran by Naser Makarem Shirazi (1927 CE – Present) [Thematic Exegesis] (translated of Payam-i Qur'an from Persian to Arabic).
- Mafahim al-Quran by Ja'far Sobhani (1929 CE - Present). [Thematic Exegesis] (translated of Manshur jawid from Persian to Arabic).
- Tasnim Tafsir by Abdollah Javadi-Amoli (1933 CE – present) (translated from Persian to Arabic).

=== Persian ===
- Rawz al-jinan wa ruh al-jinan (Historical Exegesis) by Abu al-Futuh al-Razi (1078 – 1157/61 CE)
- Tafsir Gazur (jalāʼ al-adhhān wa-jalāʼ al-aḥzān) by Abul al-Mahasin Husayn Ibn Hasan Jurjani (1377~1341 CE)
- Menhaj Al-Sadeghin by Molla Fathollah Kashani (d. 1580 CE / 988 A.H.)
- Tafsir al-Mizan by Muhammad Husayn Tabataba'i (1904 – 1981 CE). (translated from Arabic to Persian)..
- Tafsir Novin by Mohammad Taghi Shariati (b.1907 - d.1987)
- Partoie Az Qur’an by Mahmoud Taleghani (1911 – 1979 CE)
- Tafsir Roshan by Mirza Hassan Mostafavi (1913 – 2005 CE)
- Tafsir Nemuneh by Naser Makarem Shirazi (1927 CE – Present).
- Tafsir ahsan al-hadith by Ali Akbar Qarashi (b. 1928 CE)
- Tarjomane Foraghan by Mohammad Sadeqi Tehrani (1926 – 2011 CE)
- Payam-i Qur'an by Naser Makarem Shirazi (1927 CE – Present) [Thematic Exegesis].
- Manshur jawid by Ja'far Sobhani (1929 CE – Present). [Thematic Exegesis].
- Tasnim Tafsir by Abdollah Javadi-Amoli (1933 CE – present).
- Tafsir Rahnama by Akbar Hashemi Rafsanjani (1934 – 2017 CE)
- Tafsir Nur by contemporary scholar Mohsin Qara'ati (1945 CE – present)
- Tafsir Hedayat by Mohammad Taqi al-Modarresi (b. 1945 CE – Present) (translated from Arabic to Persian).
- Tafsir Meshkat by contemporary scholar Mohammad-ali Ansari
- Makhzan al-Irfan fi Tafsir al-Quran by Banu Amin (1886–1983)
- Tafasiral-Quran by Mulla Sadra (1571/72 – 1635/40 CE / 980 – 1050 AH) (Philosophical Exegesis) (translated from Arabic to Persian).

=== English ===
Translation

- Tafsir al-Mizan by Muhammad Husayn Tabataba'i (1904 – 1981 CE). (translated from Arabic to English by Sa'id Akhtar Rizvi).
- An Enlightening Commentary into the Light of the Holy Qur'an by Kamal Faqih Imani (translated from Persian to English by Abbas Sadr-'ameli).
- Tafsir Nemuneh by Naser Makarem Shirazi (1927 CE – Present) (translated from Persian to English).
- The Qur'an Interpretation. 2 vols. by Mohammed-Ali Hassan Al-Hilly (1968, Iraq), translated by E. A. Nassir (2016, Beirut). The Qur'an Interpretation (2 vol). (from Arabic)

=== Urdu ===
Translation

- Tafsir Nemuneh by Naser Makarem Shirazi (1927 CE – Present) (translated from Persian to Urdu).
- Al-Mizan by Muhammad Husayn Tabataba'i (1904 – 1981 CE). (Has translated into Urdu by Hassan Raza Ghadiri)
- Tafsir-e-Mauzui by Naser Makarem Shirazi (1927 CE – Present) [Thematic Exegesis] (translated of Payam-i Qur'an into Urdu by Syed Safdar Hussain Najafi).
- Tafsir-e-Mauzui by Ja‘far Sobhani (1929 CE – Present). [Thematic Exegesis] (translated of Manshur jawid into Urdu by Syed Safdar Hussain Najafi).

Original

- Tafsir Anwar-e-Najaf fi Asrar Mushaf by Hussain Bakhsh Jarra (1920 – 1990 CE)
- Al Kauthar fi Tafsir al-Quran by Mohsin Ali Najafi (1938 CE - Present)

== Zaydi Shia ==
=== Arabic ===
- Tafsir Furat Kufi by Furat Ibn Furat Ibn Ibrahim al-Kufi
- Al-Burhan by Abu'l-Fath an-Nasir ad-Dailami
- Taysir at-Tafsir by Badreddin al-Houthi

== Mu'tazila ==
- Al-Kashshaf by Al-Zamakhshari (d. 539 AH/1144 CE). - Considered to be the standard work of Mu'tazila tafsir, with emphasis on Arabic grammar and lexicography. The author later converted to Sunni Islam.

== Ibadi ==
=== Arabic ===
- Tafsir Kitab Allah al-Aziz by Hud ibn Muhakkam al-Hawwari
- Muhammad ibn Yusuf Attafayish (1821 - 1914), a preeminent Algerian Ibadi scholar, wrote three tafsir
1. Da‘i l-‘Amal li- Yawm al-Ajal (incomplete)
2. Himyan al-Zad ild Dar al-Ma‘ad
3. Taysir al-Tafsir
- Jawahir al-Tafasir by Ahmed bin Hamad al-Khalili

== Modernist ==
=== Arabic ===
- Tafsir al-Tahrir wa'l-Tanwir (1984) by Muhammad al-Tahir ibn Ashur. Notable of its emphasis on the rhetorical aspect of the Qur’an.

=== Urdu ===
- Al-Bayan by Javed Ahmad Ghamidi.
- Mafhoom Al Quran by (Allama Ghulam Ahmad Parwez)

=== English ===
- The Message of the Qur'an by Muhammad Asad, 1980.

== Other ==
=== English ===
- The Study Qur’an — authored by an editorial collective led by noted Islamic philosopher Seyyed Hossein Nasr, published in 2015 by HarperCollins. This work seeks to highlight the depth and diversity of interpretations that exist within traditional Islam, drawing on 40 major classical commentaries from a wide range of orientations, including both Sunni and Shi'a viewpoints, the Maturidi, Ashari, Mutazili and Athari schools of Islamic theology, as well as Sufi interpretations; but excluding modern reformist and fundamentalist views. Has been hailed by academics as an unparalleled reference work in the field of Islamic studies.
- The Ascendant Qur'an: Realigning Man to the Divine Power Culture by Muhammad al Asi

== See also ==
- Quran
- Tafsir
- English translations of the Quran
- List of Quran interpreters
- List of Islamic texts
