= Tafsir (disambiguation) =

Tafsir or Tafseer (Arabic: تفسير translit. Tafsīr, lit. 'interpretation') is the Arabic word for exegesis, usually of the Qur'an.

== Event ==
- Tafsir-ul-Quran Mahfil or Waz Mahfil, a type of Islamic gathering in Bangladesh

== Books ==
There are many exegesis works titled Tafsir or Tafsir al- (meaning Tafsir of) including:

- Tafsir Ayyashi
- Tafsir al-Baghawi
- Tafsir al-Baydawi
- Tafsir al-Durr al-Manthoor
- Tafsir Furat Kufi
- Tafseer Ghareeb al Quran or Al-Mufradat fi Gharib al-Quran
- Tafsir Imam Ja'far al-Sadiq
- Tafsir al-Jalalayn
- Tafseer-e-Kabeer
  - Tafseer-e-Sagheer
- Tafsir al-Kabir (al-Razi)
- Tafsir ibn Kathir
- Tafsir Maariful Quran
- Tafsir al-Manar
- Tafsir al-Mazhari
- Tafsir Meshkat
- Tafsir Al-Mishbah
- Tafsir al-Mizan
- Tafsir Nemooneh
- Tafsir Noor
- Tafsir Novin
- Tafsir Qomi, or Tafsir Al-Qummi
- Tafsir al-Qurtubi
- Tafsir al-Tabari
- Tafsir al-Tahrir wa'l-Tanwir
- Tafsir al-Thalabi
- Tafsir Zia ul Quran

=== Jewish works ===
- Tafsir at-Tawriyya Bi-'l-'Arabiyya or Tafsir Rasag, a translation of the Torah into Judeo-Arabic by Saadia Gaon.

== Persons ==
- Tafsir Chérif (born 1996), Guinean footballer
- Tafsir Malick Ndiaye (born 1953), Senegalese Judge of the International Tribunal for the Law of the Sea

== See also ==
- List of tafsir works
- List of Shia books, the section Quranic Tafsirs
- Tafsir al-Kabir (disambiguation), a number of works known by the name
