= Tafsir Noor =

- Author: Mohsin Qara'ati
- Original title: تفسیر نور
- Language: Persian
- Subject: Qur'anic exegesis
- Genre: Islamic literature
- Publication date: 1997
- Publication place: Iran
- Media type: Print (Hardcover & Paperback)
- Pages: 12 volumes

Tafsir Noor is an exegesis on the Quran by Iranian cleric Mohsin Qara'ati in Persian. The book has 12 volumes and won "Book of the Year Award" in 1997 from the President of Iran. Before publishing his own commentary on Qur'an, the author was a contributing member of the Tafsir Nemooneh team. In the introduction, the author admits relying on older tafsir works, such as Majma' al-Bayan, Tafsir al-Kabir (al-Razi), Tafsir Noor al-Thaqalayn, Ruh al-Ma'ani, Tafsir al-Mizan, Fi Zilal al-Quran, Tafsir Safi, Atyab al-bayan, Tafsir Nemooneh and Tafsir Rahnama up to seventy percent; the rest he says are his own findings.

== Structure ==
In this book, the author starts with translation of the verses, the situation in which it was revealed, and related traditions on the verses. He then poses some questions that might come to a reader's mind and addresses them. He concludes the commentary of each passage with the morals of the verses.

== See also ==
- Qur'an
- Qur'anic exegesis (Tafsir)
- List of tafsir works
