= Verse of khayr ol-bareyyah =

Verse in the Quran

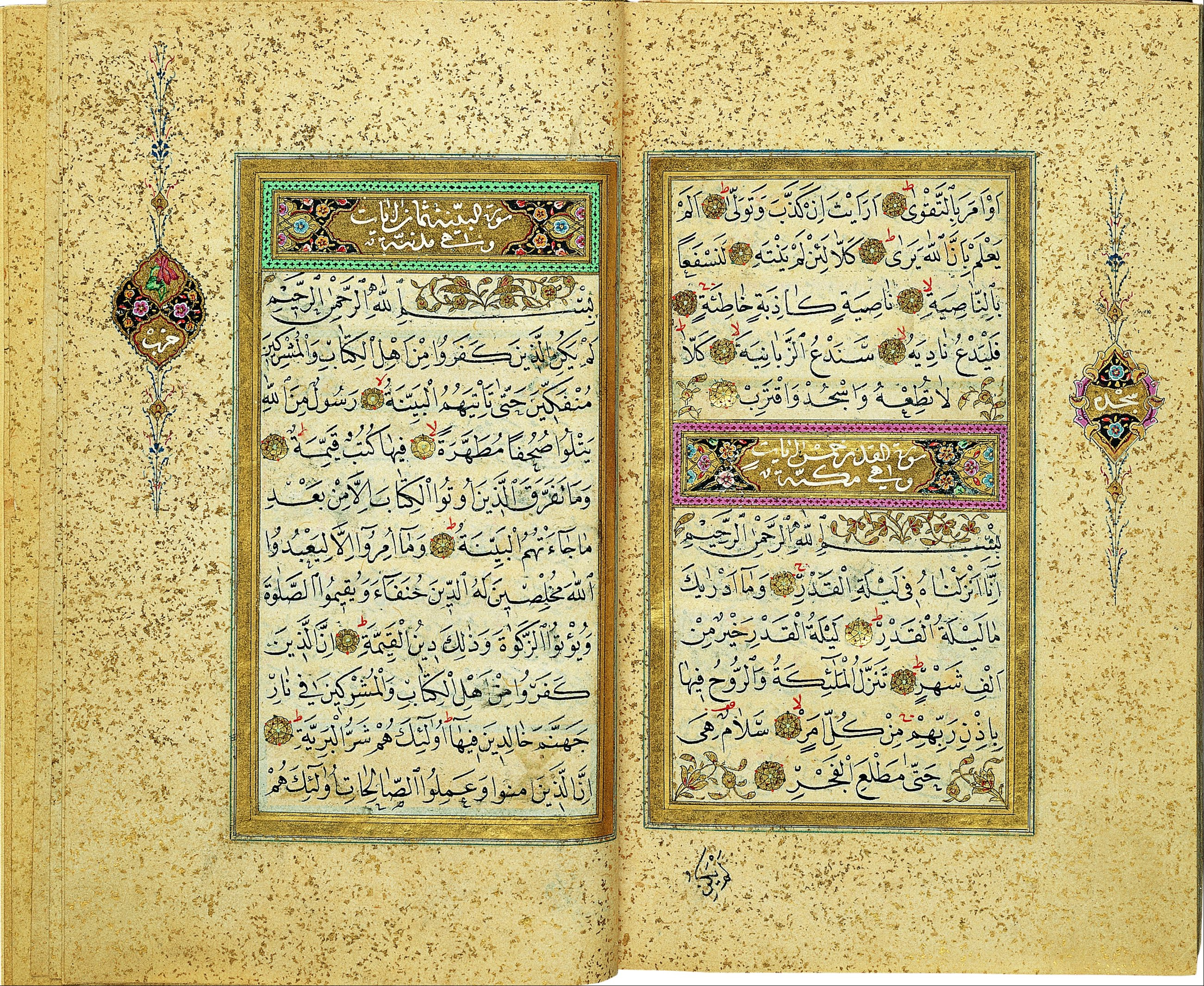
Surah of Al-Bayyina in an 18th century Quran

The ayah of khayr ol-bareyyah is the seventh verse of Al-Bayyina Surah of Islam's holy book, the Quran, which, according to the famous exegesis book such as Al-Mizan and Majma' al-Bayan, refers to the spiritual position of Ali ibn Abi Talib and his Shiites. The literal translation of the title is the best of creatures.

== Text ==
Arabic: إِنَّ الَّذِينَ آمَنُوا وَعَمِلُوا الصَّالِحَاتِ أُولَٰئِكَ هُمْ خَيْرُ الْبَرِيَّةِ

English: As for those who believed and did righteous deeds, they are the best of all human beings.

== Revelation ==
=== Sunni exegesis ===
Hakem Haskani, a Sunni scholar, quotes in the book Shawahed ol-Tanzil le-Qawaed al-Tafzil as follows:

From Abu Barzeh: The Messenger of God recited the verse "إِنَّ الَّذِينَ آمَنُوا وَعَمِلُوا الصَّالِحَاتِ أُولَٰئِكَ هُمْ خَيْرُ الْبَرِيَّةِ" and then said: "O Ali, khayr ol-bareyyah (the best of creatures) refers to you and your Shiites".

From Muhammad al-Baqir: The Messenger of God recited the verse of khayr ol-bareyyah and then said to Ali: "Khayr ol-bareyyah are you and your Shiites".

From Jabir ibn Abd Allah: We were sitting with the Messenger of God next to the Kaaba, when Imam Ali entered, the Messenger of God said: "My brother came", and then said: "I swear by the house of God that this man believed in God before all of you and obeyed God more than all of you. He is more faithful to the divine covenant than all of you, and he judges by the command of God more than all of you, and he is more just in dividing the Bayt al-mal, and he is better than you in dealing with the weak and has a higher position", it was at this time that the verse of khayr ol-bareyyah was revealed.

=== Shia exegesis ===
Abu Ali Fadhl ibn Hasan Tabresi, one of the Shiite scholars, in the book Majma' al-Bayan in the following of the verse of khayr ol-bareyyah, quotes from Abu'l-Qasim Ali ibn al-Hasan al-Kalbi, quoting Jabir ibn Abd Allah:

We were with the Messenger of God when Ali ibn Abi Talib entered, at which time the Prophet said: "I swear by the one whose my life is in his power, this man (referring to Ali) and his Shiites will be saved on the Day of Judgment." It was then that the verse of khayr ol-bareyyah was revealed.

Muhammad Husayn Tabatabai in the book Tafsir al-Mizan says in the following of the verse of khayr ol-bareyyah:

In the words of Yazid ibn Sharahil, it is stated: I heard from Ali, he said: "The Messenger of God was dying while I was leaning his head on my chest, at that time he said: O Ali, have you not heard the word of God Almighty who says: "إِنَّ الَّذِينَ آمَنُوا وَعَمِلُوا الصَّالِحَاتِ أُولَٰئِكَ هُمْ خَيْرُ الْبَرِيَّةِ", khayr ol-bareyyah (the best of creatures), refers to you and your Shiites".

Naser Makarem Shirazi in the book Tafsir Nemooneh in the discussion of Ali and his Shiites, quotes as follows:

In many narrations that have been narrated through Sunnis and their famous sources, as well as in well-known Shiite sources, the verse of khayr ol-bareyyah refers to Ali and his followers.

== See also ==
- Verse of wilayah
- Obedience verse
- Verse of ikmal al-din
- Al-tabligh verse
- Verse of purification
- Verse of mawadda
- Imamate and guardianship of Ali ibn Abi Talib
