= Tafsir Novin =

Tafsir by Mohammad Taghi Shariati

- Author: Mohammad Taghi Shariati
- Original title: تفسیر نوین
- Language: Persian
- Subject: Qur'anic exegesis (Tafsir)
- Genre: Islamic literature
- Publication place: Iran
- Media type: Print

Tafsir Novin is an exegesis on the Quran written by Mohammad Taghi Shariati (b.1907 - d.1987), father of Ali Shariati.

The author is believed to be one of the pioneers of age-dependent commentation in Iran. Inspired by religious reformist ideas, in his book he targets common people. He avoids philosophical terms and tries to use as little lexicographical discussions as possible. From older commentaries, he cites Majma' al-Bayan, Al-Tibbyan Fi Tafsir al-Quran, and Tafsir al-Kabir (al-Razi) which he both uses as reference and at times criticises.

== References (Persian) ==
- Roshd Encyclopedia
- Tebyan: Introducing Tafsir Novin
