= Tafsir al-Kabir (disambiguation) =

Tafsir al-Kabir may refer to:

- Tafsir al-Kabir by Fakhr al-Din al-Razi, also known as Mafatih al-Ghayb
- Tafsir al-Tabari by Ibn Jarir al-Tabari
- Tafsir-i Kabir, by Mirza Basheer-ud-Din Mahmood Ahmad
- Tafsir al-Thalabi by Ahmad ibn Muhammad al-Thalabi

== See also ==
- List of tafsir works
- Tafsir (disambiguation)
