= Tasnim =

Tasnim (Tasnīm) or Tasneem may refer to:

- a well of water in Paradise according to Islam

== Given name ==
- Tasneem Essop, South African politician
- Tasneem Motara (born 1982), South African politician
- Tasneem Roc (born 1978), Australian television and film actress of Burmese and Scottish descent
- Tasneem Sheikh, Indian actress
- Tasneem Zehra Husain, Pakistani theoretical physicist
- Tasneem Qureishi, a fictional character from the American TV series Homeland

== Surname ==
- Ahmed Tasnim (born 1935), Pakistan Navy admiral

== See also ==
- Tasneem Tafsir, a tafsir (interpretation) of the Quran by Javadi Amoli
- Tasnim News Agency, of Iran's IRGC
