= Tafsiri Raman =

Modern work of Tafsir

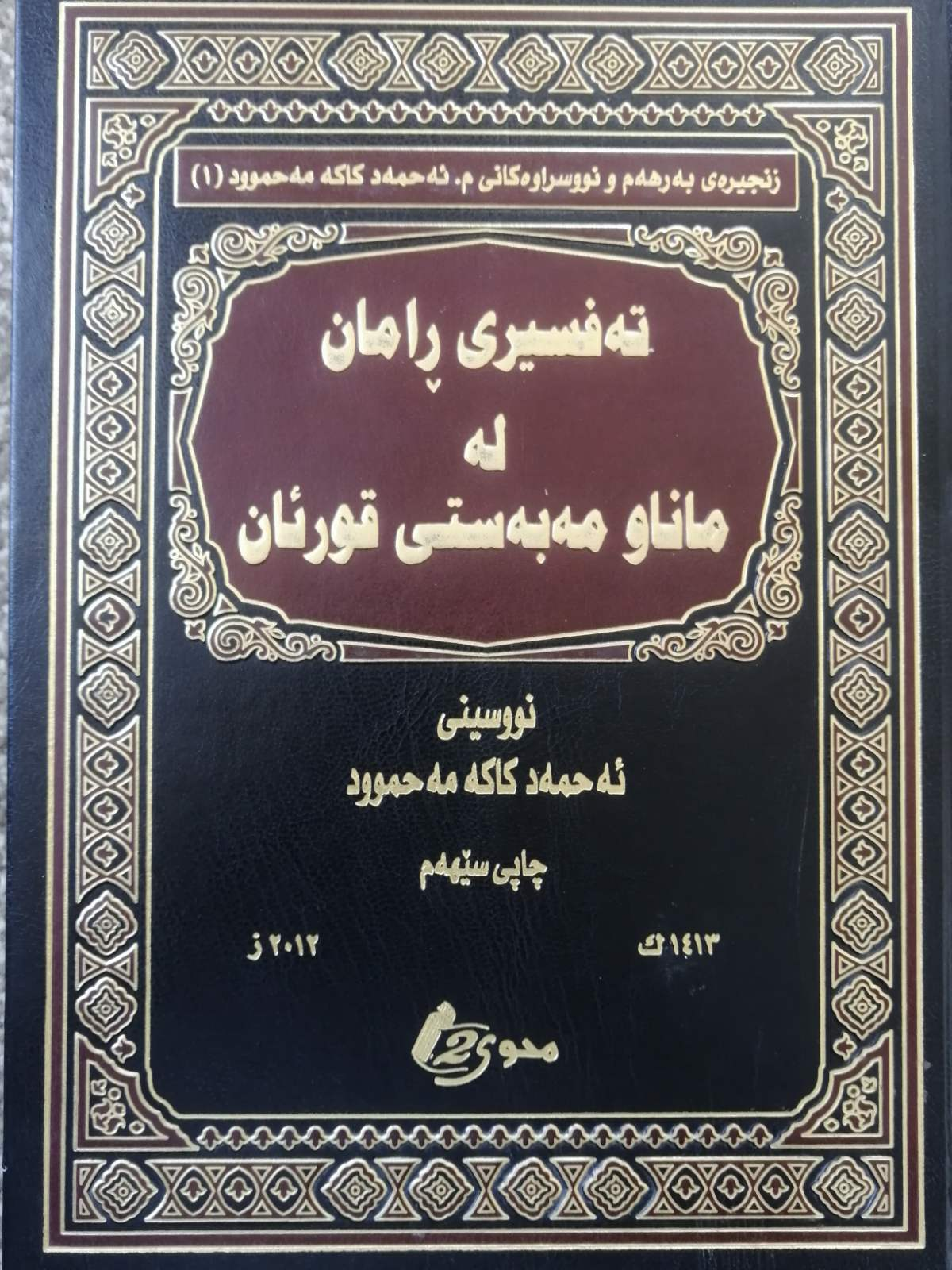
- Cover of the 2012 reprint
- Author: Ahmad Kaka Mahmood
- Original title: Tafsiri Raman li Ma'naa al-Qur'an wa al-Gharad Minh
- Language: Sorani
- Genre: Tafsir (interpretation and exegesis of the Qur'an)
- Publisher: Independent publication
- Publication place: Iraq

Tafsiri Raman, fully known as Tafsiri Raman li Ma'naa al-Qur'an wa al-Gharad Minh (Sorani: تەفسیری ڕامان لە ماناو مەبەستی قورئان) is a modern Tafsir of the Qur'an, authored by the Iraqi scholar, Ahmad Kaka Mahmood. The book is written in the Sorani language and has been reprinted several times, the latest reprint being in 2020.

== Publication history ==
Ahmad Kaka Mahmood first started writing his Tafsir of the Qur'an in 1992, completing his work and publishing it in 2005. It was then reprinted in 2012. An abridged version of Tafsiri Raman, with its contents revised by the author's son Irfan Ahmad Kaka Mahmood, was published in 2020. The full Tafsir was also adapted into a free mobile app in 2022, which is available for both iOS and Android operating systems.

== Content ==
Written in the Sorani language, the content of Tafsiri Raman concerns the exegesis and interpretation of verses from the Qur'an. Ahmad Kaka Mahmood refrained from using Israʼiliyyat as much as possible in his Tafsir. His approach to Qur'anic interpretation was done as close as possible to how the Tabi'un and Tabi' al-Tabi'in did it, with a few minor differences.

== See also ==
- Tafsir Ibnu Abbas
- List of Tafsir works
