= Bayan al-Saʽada =

- Author: Sultan ʽAli Shah
- Original title: بيان السعادة في مقامات العبادة
- Language: Arabic
- Subject: Qur'anic exegesis (Tafsir)
- Genre: Islamic literature
- Publication place: Iran
- Media type: Print

Bayan al-Saʽada fi Maqamat al-ʽIbada (Arabic, 'The Elucidation of Felicity concerning the Stations of Worship') is an exegesis on the Qur'an by Ni'matullāhī Sufi leader Sultan ʽAli Shah in Arabic.

== Exegetic approach ==
This exegesis of the entire Qur'an is written from the Shi'i mystical viewpoint. In his tafsir, Sultan 'Ali Shah included exoteric as well as Sufi commentary.

== See also ==
- Qur'an
- Qur'anic exegesis (Tafsir)
- List of tafsir works
