= Tafsir Gazur =

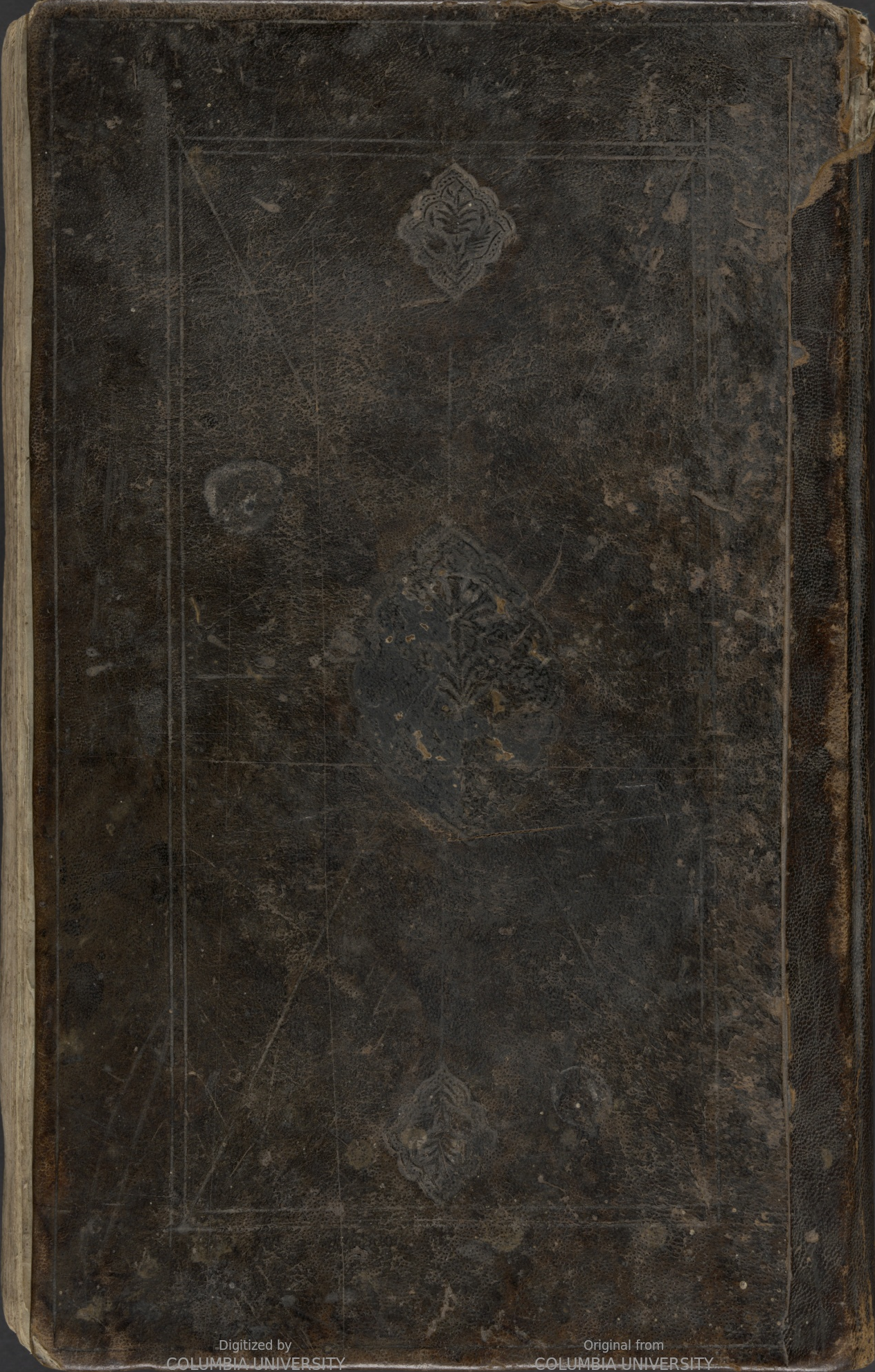
- Author: Abul al-Mahasin Husayn Ibn Hasan Jurjani
- Original title: جلاء الأذهان و جلاء الأحزان
- Language: Persian
- Subject: Quranic exegesis
- Genre: Tafsir
- Published: 8th to 14th centuries
- Publication place: Persia

Tafsir Gazur, also known as jalāʼ al-adhhān wa-jalāʼ al-aḥzān, is an exegesis on the Quran in Persian by Abul al-Mahasin Husayn Ibn Hasan Jurjani, from the 8th to 14th centuries. The book was originally named Jala' al-Adhhan wa Jala' al-Ahzan. "Gazur" comes from the author's name. According to Aqa Buzurg Tihrani, he was one of the Shi'i scholars of the 10th A.H. /16th century.

== Significance ==
Tafsir-i Gazur's importance in linguistics and literature is considered equivalent to that of Rawz al-jinan ve ruh al-jinan. Tafsir-i Gazur was used by Molla Fathollah Kashani as the primary source in writing Tafsir Menhaj Al-Sadeghin. Mir Jalal al-Din Muhaddith Urmawi was the first to publish Tafsir-i Gazur in ten volumes between 1337 and 1341, republished in 1958 and 1962.
