= Tasneem Tafsir =

Tafsir by Shia scholar Abdollah Javadi Amoli in Persian

- Author: Abdollah Javadi Amoli
- Language: Persian
- Subject: Quranic exegesis
- Genre: Islamic literature
- Publication place: Iran
- Awards: ISESCO Award (2006)

Tasneem Tafsir (also known as Tafsir Tasnim) is an exegesis of the Quran by contemporary Shia scholar Abdollah Javadi Amoli.

The work is written in Persian. The exegesis follows Tabatabaei's al-Mizan, in that it tries to interpret a verse based on other verses. Amoli summarized the exegis, analyzed the verse, and ended with a Hadith of the verse.

== Awards ==
The book won the 2006 Islamic Educational scientific and cultural organization Award as the "top research in the field of Islamic and Quranic Studies" category.
