= Abu al-Futuh al-Razi =

Shiite theologian and author (died 1131)

Abū al-Futūḥ al-Rāzī أبو الفتوح الرّازي

Personal life
- Born: 470 Hijri (1077-8 CE)
- Died: 552 or 556 Hijri; 1157-8 or 1160-1
- Era: Seljuk Empire
- Region: Iran
- Main interest(s): Ḥadīth, Kalam, Fiqh, Tafsir

Religious life
- Religion: Islam
- Denomination: Shia
- Sect: Twelver
- Jurisprudence: Ja'fari

Muslim leader
- Students: Ibn Shahrashub, Nasir al-Din al-Tusi

Abū al-Futūḥ al-Ḥusayn ibn ʿAlī ibn Muḥammad ibn Aḥmad al-Khuzāʿī al-Rāzī al-Nīsābūrī (أبو الفتوح الحسين بن علي بن محمد بن أحمد الخزاعي الرازي النيسابوري), commonly known as Abū al-Futūḥ al-Rāzī (Arabic: أبو الفتوح الرّازي) or Abū al-Futūḥ Jamāl al-Din al-Rāzī al-Nīsābūrī (أبو الفتوح جمال ادين الرازي النيسابوري), also known as Khaza'i Nishaburi (fl. 6th A.H./12th century), was a Twelver Shiʿite Muslim theologian and author. He came from a Khorasanian Arab family originally from Nishapur from the famous Khuza'a tribe, which settled in Nishapur after the Muslim conquest. According to Abu al-Futuh, his great-grandfather was Nafi' ibn Budayl ibn Warqa' al-Khuza'i, a companion of the prophet Muhammad. His grandfather had moved to Rayy.

His most famous work, Rawz al-jinan wa Ruh al-Janan, is considered the first Persian-language exegesis on the Quran. The book, consisting of twenty volumes, is the earliest surviving Persian tafsīr with an Imāmī Shīʿī emphasis. It delves into mystical themes regularly.
