= Tafsir Furat Kufi =

Exegesis of the Quran by Furat Ibn Furat Ibn Ibrahim al-Kufi

- Author: Furat Ibn Furat Ibn Ibrahim al-Kufi
- Original title: تفسير فرات الكوفي
- Language: Arabic
- Subject: Quranic exegesis
- Genre: Islamic literature
- Publication date: 9th-10th century A.D.
- Publication place: Abbasid Caliphate
- Media type: Manuscript

Tafsir Furat Kufi is an exegesis of the Quran by Furat Ibn Furat Ibn Ibrahim al-Kufi (9th and 10th century A.D.) and is one of the oldest Shia Quranic commentaries, basing itself upon hadith. The traditions used by this book are mainly narrated either from Muhammad al-Baqir, Jafar al-Sadiq or Ali's disciples such as `Abd Allah ibn `Abbas, Mujahid and Asbagh Ibn Nubata; although there are some that relate to one of the companions of Muhammad.

== Historical discussion ==
In Shia Islam it is assumed that the Imams inherited their teachings from Muhammad. The Imams therefore, are considered the first authorities of Qur'anic interpretation.

== See also ==
- Qur'an
- Qur'anic exegesis (Tafsir)
- List of tafsir works
