= Tafsir Roshan =

- Author: Mirza Hassan Mostafavi
- Original title: تفسیر روشن
- Language: Persian
- Subject: Qur'anic exegesis
- Genre: Islamic literature
- Publication date: 20th century
- Publication place: Iran
- Media type: Print (hardcover & paperback)
- Pages: 16 volumes

Tafsir Roshan (Persian: تفسیر روشن / Clear Explanation) is an exegesis on the Quran written by Mirza Hassan Mostafavi in Persian in sixteen volumes during the 20th century. The commentator has used a lexicological approach in his book and emphasizes on the idea that Quranic words are metaphoric. The book targets common people from different backgrounds.
