= Tafsir Meshkat =

- Author: Mohammad Ali Ansari
- Original title: تفسیر مشکات
- Language: Persian
- Subject: Qur'anic exegesis
- Genre: Islamic literature
- Publication place: Iran
- Media type: Print (Hardcover & Paperback)

Tafsir Meshkat is an exegesis on Qur'an by contemporary Shia Islam scholar Mohammad Ali Ansari in Persian. The book makes use of old and new Persian poems, as well as history, sociology and other scientific observations, with a focus on the etymology and meanings of the words used in the Qur'an.

The title "Meshkat" (مِشْکاة) refers to the "niche" mentioned in the Quranic verse of light (An-Nur 24:35), symbolizing a channel of divine guidance. Ansari selected this title to reflect the tafsir’s mission of illuminating Quranic wisdom and guidance for humanity.

== See also ==
- Qur'an
- Qur'anic exegesis (Tafsir)
- List of tafsir works
