= Rawd al-Jinan =

Book by Abu l-Futuh al-Razi

Rawd al-Jinan wa Ruh al-Janan
- Author: Abu l-Futuh al-Razi
- Original title: رَوضُ الجِنان و رَوحُ الجَنان فی تفسیر القرآن
- Language: Persian
- Subject: Quranic exegesis
- Genre: Tafsir
- Published: 6th A.H./12th century
- Publication place: Persia
- Pages: 20 volumes

Rawd al-Jinan wa Ruh al-Janan (The Cool Breeze of Paradise and [God's] Breath for the Soul) also known as Tafsīr Abū al- Futūḥ is an exegesis on the Quran written by Abu l-Futuh al-Razi in the 6th A.H./12th century. The book, consisting of twenty volumes, is the earliest surviving Persian tafsīr with an Imāmī Shīʿī emphasis. It delves into mystical themes regularly.

== Exegetical approach ==
Rawḍ al-jinān is an exhortatory commentary.
