= Al-Tibbyan Fi Tafsir al-Quran =

Quranic exegesis by Shaykh Tusi

- Author: Shaykh Tusi
- Original title: التبیان في تفسیر القرآن
- Language: Arabic
- Subject: Quranic exegesis
- Genre: Tafsir
- Published: 11th century
- Publication place: Persia
- Pages: 10 volumes

At-Tibyan Fi Tafsir al-Quran (Arabic: التبیان في تفسیر القرآن, romanized: at-Tibyān fī Tafsīr al-Qurān) is an exegesis of the Quran in ten volumes written by Shaykh Tusi. Shaykh Tabarsi, the author of Majma' al-Bayan, admitted using this book in writing his commentary. A copy is available at the Malek Library, Tehran. This exegesis has been published along with its summary as Mukhtasar-ut-Tibyan. The author uses hadith as a major component in writing his commentary and preserves the traditions of several of Twelver Shi'i imams.

According to Bar-Asher, beginning with al-Tusi, Imami exegetes started a new trend in which hadith was no longer the only means of interpreting Quran.

== Characters ==
Tebyan interpretation counted as the first and oldest Shiite interpretation which is available today. Sheikh Tusi mentioned tebyan book as a unique book. According to the book in terms of the interpretation is different from other books. Sheikh Tusi methodology in the interpretation is the result of jurists and theologians 's many years of efforts in Iraq and Baghdad during Buwayhid time. Can be said that he was impressed by a beautiful approach as useful and honorable Sheikh Morteza was. This interpretation affected more latter interpretations like Al Mizan, Majma Al Bayan etc. All the chapters in this commentary are set by the Qur'an. Sheikh Tusi in his approach tebyan a verbal approach and almost narrative Ast.shykh in tebyan to justify the use of reason in the interpretation of the Qur'an criticizes some point, such as the revelation of the seven letters, and incarnation has been described. This interpretation is fraught with legal, theological and literary and theological content.
