= Mohsin Qara'ati =

Iranian cleric (born 1945)

Mohsen Qara'ati
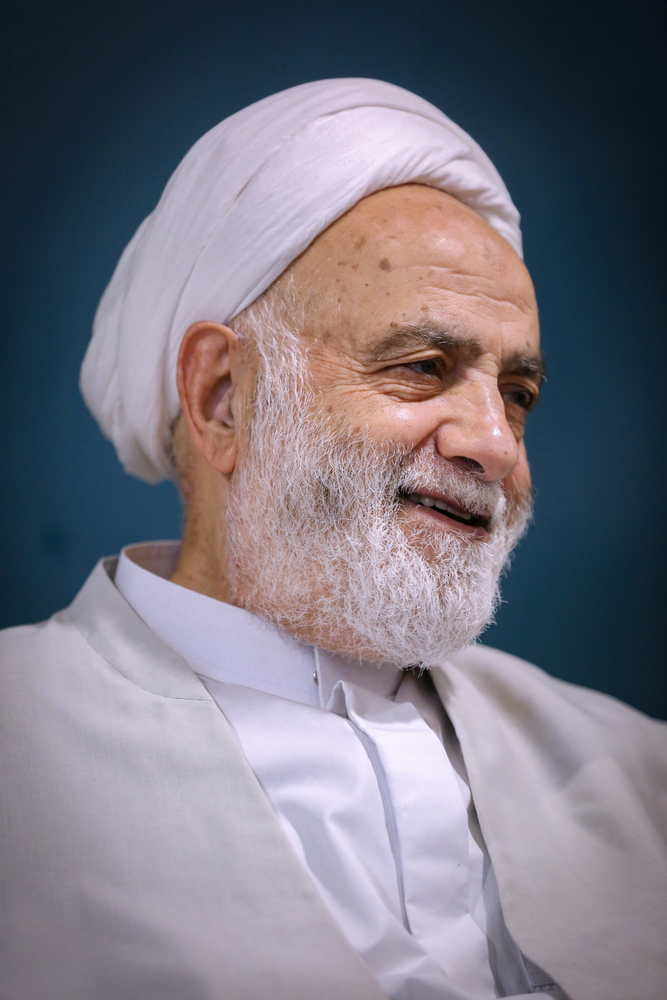
- Born: 29 December 1945 (age 79); Kashan
- Citizenship: Iran
- Occupation(s): Clergy, Islamicist, Tafsir
- Years active: 1980–present
- Children: 2
- Website: https://gharaati.ir/

Mohsen Qara'ati (Persian: محسن قرائتی) is an Iranian Twelver Shia cleric who was born in 1945 in the city of Kashan, and his father was Ali Naqi (Qara'ati). Mohsen Qara'ati who is commonly known as "Ayatollah Qara'ati" or "Hujjat al-islam Qara'ati," was appointed as the representative of Sayyid Ruhollah Khomeini (the founder and previous leader of Islamic Republic of Iran) at the "literacy movement organization" in Iran in 1981.

Mohsen Qara'ati who is also known as "Haj Aqa Qara'ati (Persian: حاج آقا قرائتی)", has been appointed as the chief of "Setade Eqame Namaz" (the headquarters of prayer presenting)". Among the most famous characteristics of this Shi'a clergy is that he tries to follow timely jokes in his lectures, which makes his speeches more interesting from the view of the listeners.

He has also suggested making a "Halal laughing site" (to pass free times by Halal [permissible] laughing). He has stated in his sermons that anyone that declares themselves to be an adherent of the Baháʼí Faith must be killed.

== Books ==
- Familiarity with prayer
- 114 points about prayer
- Interpretation of prayer
- Principles of Islamic beliefs
- Oneness
- Justice
- Prophecy
- Imamate
- Resurrection
- Gnahshnasy
- Hajj
- The human and world in the Quran
- Enjoining good and forbidding wrong
- Minutes with the Quran (taken from the interpretation of light)
- Quranic questions and answers
- Important questions, short answers using examples
- Tafsir Noor (10 full volume commentary of the Quran)
