= Tafsir Noor al-Thaqalayn =

- Author: Abdul Ali Aroussi Howayzi
- Original title: تفسير نور الثقلين
- Language: Arabic
- Subject: Quranic exegesis
- Genre: Islamic literature
- Publication date: Late 11th or early 12th century Hijri/17th Century AD
- Publication place: Iran

Tafsir Noor al-Thaqalayn is an exegesis on the Quran written by Abdul Ali Aroussi Howayzi, shia jurist and hadith narrator in the late 11th or early 12th century Hijri/17th Century AD. This commentary on the Quran is considered as narrative since it contains more than 30,000 hadiths. According to Howayzi himself, these are interpretive narrations related to the verses of Quran. However, it is believed that the author did not perform ijtihad based on the narrations, and only gathered them as a primary source.
