= Tafsir Safi =

Commentary on the Quran and hadith by Shia scholar Mohsen Fayz Kashani

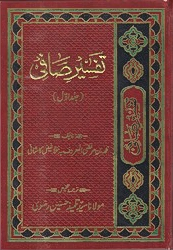
- Author: Mohsen Fayz Kashani
- Original title: الصافي في تفسير القرآن
- Language: Arabic
- Subject: Qur'anic exegesis (Tafsir)
- Genre: Islamic literature
- Publication date: 17th century
- Publication place: Iran
- Media type: Print

Tafsir Safi (full name: al-Safi fi Tafsir Kalam Allah al-Wafi) is an exegesis of the Qur'an written by 17th century Shia scholar Mohsen Fayz Kashani. This commentary on the Qur'an mostly cites from the Twelve Imams and may be classified as a work on hadith. It belongs to an era when most tafsirs relied "heavily on polemical hadith tradition buttressed by the accumulated wealth of hagiography and the euphoria of power during the medieval era.
