= Tafsir Hedayat =

- Author: Grand Ayatollah Mohammad Taqi al-Modarresi
- Original title: تفسير هداية
- Language: Arabic
- Subject: Qur'anic exegesis (Tafsir)
- Genre: Islamic studies
- Publication date: 1978-1984
- Publication place: Iran
- Media type: Print (Hardcover)

Tafsir Hedayat is an exegesis on the Quran written by Grand Ayatollah Mohammad Taqi al-Modarresi in eighteen volumes in Arabic. The author started the series in 1978 and finished it in six years. A translation of the series was published in Persian.
