= Tafsir al-Baydawi =

Sunni Qur'anic exegesis by al-Baydawi

The Lights of Revelation and the Secrets of Interpretation
- Author: Nasir al-Din al-Baydawi
- Original title: أنوار التنزيل وأسرار التأويل
- Translator: Gibril Fouad Haddad
- Language: Arabic Edition & English translation based on 14 manuscripts, 12 commentaries, & 16 editions.
- Subject: Qur'anic Exegesis (tafsir)
- Publisher: Beacon Books
- Publication date: July 17, 2016
- Publication place: Shiraz, Persia
- Pages: 902 pages
- ISBN: 9780992633578
- Regarded by the Sunnites as the most authoritative Qur'anic exegesis.

Tafsir al-Baydawi with Urdu translation and explanation by Moulana Imran Isaa.

Tafsir al-Baydawi in Arabic with commentary and notes by Shaykh 'Abd al-Karim al-Kurai (Arabic: عبد الكريم الكُورائي).

Anwār al-Tanzīl wa-Asrār al-Ta’wīl (Arabic: أنوار التنزيل وأسرار التأويل, lit. 'The Lights of Revelation and the Secrets of Interpretation'), better known as Tafsīr al-Bayḍāwī (Arabic: تفسير البيضاوي), is one of the most popular classical Sunni Qur'anic interpretational works (tafsīr) composed by the 13th-century Muslim scholar al-Bayḍāwī (d.1319), flourished especially among non-Arab Muslim regions. This work is based on the earlier work of Zamakhsharī's al-Kashshāf ("the unveiling"). al-Kashshāf, which has Mu'tazilite views, some of which al-Bayḍāwī has amended, and some omitted. Tafsir al-Bayḍāwī is also based on al-Rāghib al-Iṣfahānī's Mufradāt Alfāẓ al-Qurʾān and his tafsir, as well as al-Tafsīr al-Kabīr (or Mafātīḥ al-Ghayb) by Fakhr al-Dīn al-Rāzī.

The commentary begins with a short opening, in which the author praises the value of interpreting the verses of the Qurʼan and argues that Qurʼanic exegesis is at the head of all sciences. The author then gives the name of his work, before launching into the explanation of al-Fatihah ("the opening"), the first chapter of the Qurʼan.

According to the Islamic scholar Gibril Fouad Haddad, the work “became and remained for seven centuries the most studied of all tafsirs,” and it is to be regarded as “the most important commentary on the Qur'an in the history of Islam.” Tafsir al-Baydawi is considered to contain the most concise analysis of the Qur'anic use of Arabic grammar and style to date and was hailed early on by Muslims as a foremost demonstration of the Qur'an’s inimitability (i'jaz ma'nawi wa-lughawi) in Sunni literature. Thus, the work has been selected by scholars as being culturally important and significant, because of its fame and influence, and many commentaries have been written on Baydawi's work.

The work became one of the standard tafsirs in the Muslim world, receiving many supercommentaries and commonly being studied in madrasa courses on Qur'anic interpretation, and was one of the first Qur'an commentaries published in Europe (1846 – 48).

== Description ==
The work enjoyed a solid reputation among Sunni theologians since its composition. More than 130 commentaries on Tafsir al-Baydawi have been written in Arabic. Brockelmann (1898) lists eighty-three of such works, with the most prominent being the multi-volume commentary by Shihab al-Din al-Khafaji (d. Egypt 1069/1659) and the gloss by Muhammad B. Muslim a-Din Mustafa al-Kuhi (d. 951/1544), which also includes lengthy quotations from the commentary by Fakhr al-Din al-Razi. Al-Baydawi's commentary has proven popular in regions of the non-Arab Muslim world, such as in the Indo-Pakistani region and Muslim Southeast Asia. It served as an important source for 'Abd al-Ra'uf al-Singkili's Malay commentary upon the whole Qur'an, Tarjuman Almustafid ("The interpreter of that which gives benefit"), written around 1085/1675. It has served as a core text in Muslim seminaries in Pakistan's Northwest Frontier Province, Malaysia, Indonesia and other places, providing an introduction to Qur'anic exegesis.

== Author ==
Al-Baydawi (d.1319) was an expert on Qurʼanic exegesis, Islamic jurisprudence, and Islamic theology. He was born in Bayda, near Shiraz, Persia. He was a Shafi'i-Ash'ari scholar, a judge, a Sufi (mystic) and a Qur'anic exegete (mufassir). Al-Baydawi grew up to be a staunch Shafi'i in jurisprudence and Ash'ari in theology and was opposed to Shiites and Mu'tazilites. He wrote a number of other scholarly works in tenets of faith, jurisprudence, and Arabic, as well as history in Persian. He was also the author of several theological treatises. His major work is the commentary on the Qur'an. After serving as a judge in Shiraz, he moved to Tabriz, where he died in 685 AH.

Al-Baydawi's father was the Chief Justice of the Fars province. His grandfather, Fakhr al-Din 'Ali al-Baydawi, also served as the chief judge. Early, Al-Baydawi was chiefly educated by his father. He believed that his teachers were taught by scholars who were in turn taught by scholars who ultimately received their education from the Islamic prophet Muhammad. According to him, his paternal grandfather came from the line of students of Abu Hamid al-Ghazali (d. 505/1111).

The AlKoran, an early English translation made use of the convenience afforded by Al-Baydawi's work as the continuous commentary reproduced the Quran in its entirety.

== Criticism ==
Al-Baydawi has attracted some criticism for the brevity of his writings, and for some inaccuracy, with some scholars accusing him of allowing some Mu'tazilite views held by al-Zamakhshari to filter through into Anwar al-Tanzil.

== Translation ==
Major translation work to English was conducted by Gibril Fouad Haddad. Haddad is a Senior Assistant Professor at SOASCIS in Applied Comparative Tafsir. He was born in Beirut, Lebanon and studied in the UK, US, France, Lebanon and Syria. He holds a doctorate from Kolej Universiti Insaniah, Kedah Darul Aman, Malaysia and a Ph.D. from Columbia University, New York, US where he was the recipient of several fellowships including one at the prestigious École Normale Supérieure in Paris, France. He also graduated summa cum laude from the New York University Latin and Greek Institute. Haddad spent nine years of study in Damascus, Syria (1997-2006) and has received ijaza (scholarly licenses) from over 150 shaykhs and has authored dozens of books and hundreds of articles in Islamic hermeneutics, doctrine, hadith, biography and heresiology.

He has lectured on Qur'an, Hadith, Prophetic biography (seerah) and Sufism in many countries. He was described in the inaugural edition of The 500 Most Influential Muslims in the World as “one of the clearest voices of traditional Islam in the West.”

== Haddad edition ==
- Dedication to HM The Sultan of Brunei Darussalam.
- Epigraphs and Prayer.
- Title page of oldest known manuscript of Anwar al-Tanzil.
- Illustrations and Tables.
- Foreword by Prof. Dr. Osman bin Bakr.
- Acknowledgements.
- Abbreviations.

=== Introduction ===
- Al-Baydawi and his Anwar al-Tanzil wa-Asrar al-Ta'wil in hermeneutical tradition.
- ---[I]. Biobibliography & Raison D'etre of the Present Work.
- Baydawi's Teachers and Chain of Transmission in shafi'i fiqh.
- Baydawi's Students.
- Baydawi's Tafsir and other works in law, legal theory, grammar and parsing, history, logic, Sufis, poetry and astronomy.
- Purpose of the present work, the first full length study in English and first bilingual edition of Baydawi's Tafsir.
- ---[II]. Background, Methodology, Sources, Salient Features.
- Transmission, analysis and polysemy in Qur'anic exegesis.
- Passive anonymizers qila / ruwiya / quri'a for weak transmission.
- The connection of ahruf (dialects / idioms) with polysemy.
- Semantics and stylistic invariables (kulliyyat al-Qur'an).
- Baydawi's synthesis of Perso-Khurasanian hermeutics.
- Comparison of the Basran and Kufan schools of grammar.
- Three examples of Baydawi's succinct treatment of complex linguistic and theological questions;
1. Is Allah an underived proper name or is it etymologically derived from ilah (deity)?
2. Does Allah task one beyond one's capacity, such as tasking Abu Lahab and Abu Jahl to believe?
3. Naskh: The pre-Islamic viability and post Islamic inviability of Judaism, Christianity and other superseded faiths.
- Expert scholarly exertion (ijtihad) and other qualifications.
- The 22 disciplines of exegesis, including scientific training.
- Scientific and philosophical discourse in the Anwar: physiology, meteorology, geophysics, mineralogy, embryology, psychology, psycholinguistics, empiricism versus materialism.
- More on the exegete's musts: piety, orthodoxy and parsing.
- Baydawi's Main Sources:
1. Purging Zamakhshari's Kashshaf: Rebuttal of Mu'tazila and other sects.
2. al-Raghib's Mufradat Alfaz al-Qur'an and his Tafsir.
3. al-Razi's Mafatih al-Ghayb.
- Sufism in Anwar al-Tanzil: the vision of Allah; self-extinction; the pleasures of paradise reflects levels of knowledge of Allah in dunya; slaughter the cow of your ego.
- ---[III]. Reception of the Tafsir in the Umma and the West.
- The Anwar as a textbook and its scholastic marginalia.
- Epigones and Epitomes.
- Gradual disuse of the Anwar in the last 75 years.
- Recourse to Anwar al-Tanzil in middle Orientalism (17th - 18th C.), France, Germany, England, Holland and Rome.
- Western confusion over al-Baydawi's Tafsir.
- ---[IV]. Translation Issues and Backdrop to the Present Work.
- Post-Kemal Azhari-Salafi fatwas against Qur'an translation.
- Our rendering of the Magnificent Qur'an.
- Anwar al-Tanzil in partial translation: Urdu, French, English.
- The present edition and translation of the Anwar.
- ---[V]. Sources Used and Our Isnad (Chain of Transmission).
- Manuscripts, editions and commentaries used in this work.
- Manuscripts.
- Editions.
- Commentaries.
- Illustrative samples from the sources used.
- Our chain of transmission to Baydawi's Anwar al-Tanzil.

=== The First Hizb of al-Baydawi's Anwar al-Tanzil ===
- Baydawi's Preamble.
- Tafsir is the chief science and foundation of all disciplines.

=== Appendix ===
- Arabic-English glossary of technical terms.
- Glossary of persons and sects cited by al-Baydawi.
- Bibliography.
- Index of Sura References.
- Index of Hadiths and Early Reports.
- Index of Poetic Verses.
- General Index.
- Other Works by Gibril Fouad Haddad.

== See also ==
- List of tafsir works
- List of Sunni books
