= Shaykh Tabarsi =

12th-century Persian scholar

Shaykh Ahmad ibn Abi Talib Tabarsi

Personal life
- Born: 468 or 469 AH (1075-77 AD/CE) Mashhad
- Died: 548 AH (1153-54 AD/CE) Bayhaq
- Region: Iran
- Main interest(s): Tafsir, Hadith sciences, Theology, Mathematics, Lexicology
- Notable work: Majma' al-Bayan

Religious life
- Religion: Islam
- Denomination: Shia
- Sect: Twelver
- Jurisprudence: Ja'fari

Muslim leader
- Influenced by: Muhammad, Ali, Ahl al-Bayt
- Influenced: Ibn Shahrashub, Muntajab al-Din al-Razi, Muhammad Husayn Tabatabaei

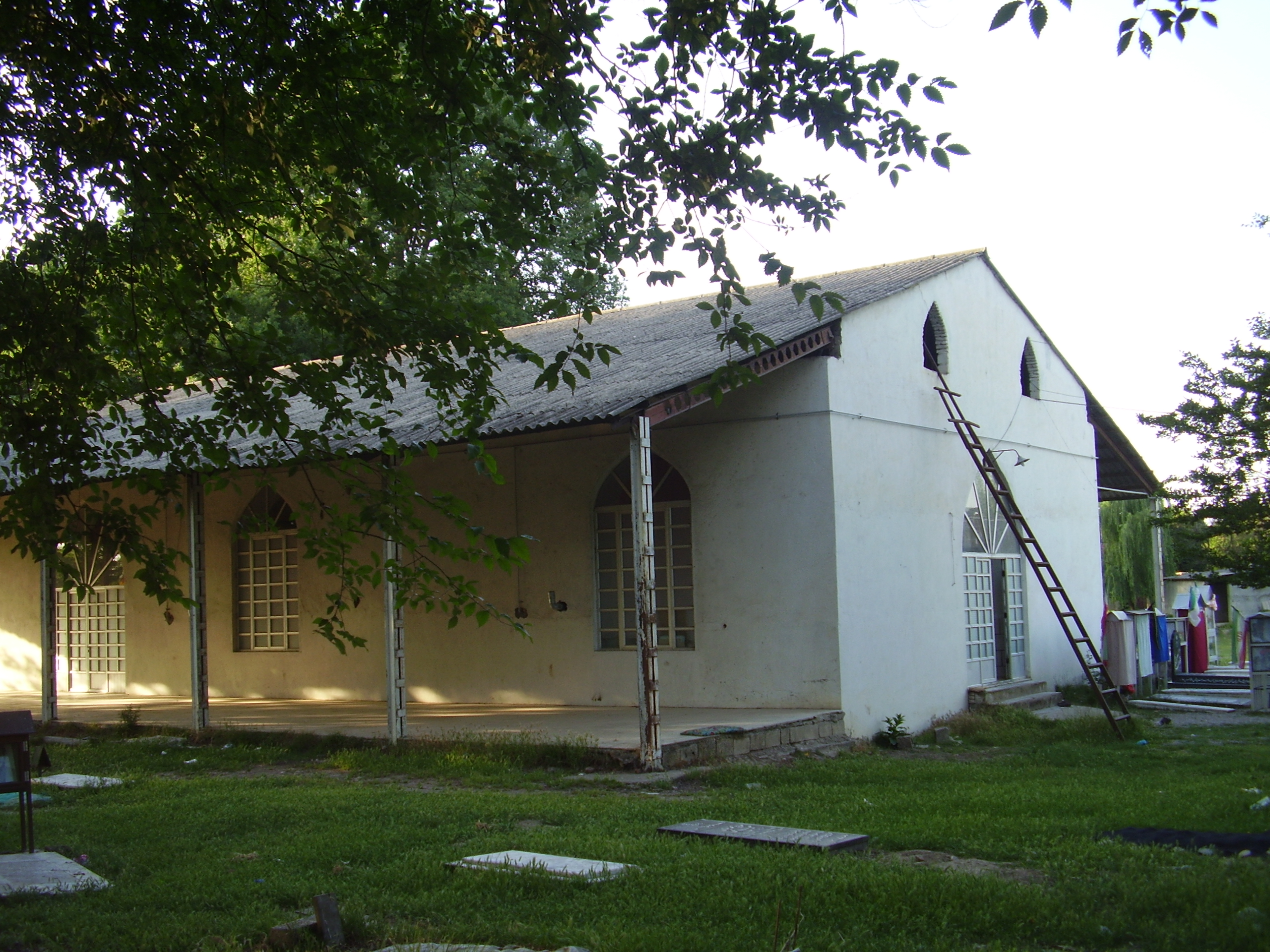
Shrine of Shaykh Ṭabarsí

Shaykh Ahmad ibn Abi Talib Tabarsi known as Shaykh Tabarsi (Persian/Arabic: شيخ طبرسى), was a 12th-century Shia Muslim scholar, exegete, lexicologist, hadith scholar and theologian of Persian descent.

== Life ==
Tabarsi was born in the year 1073 AD in Tabaristan province or some scholars said in Tafresh a city which was named at those days Tabres, Iran. He lived and taught in Mashhad until the year 1128 AD. He wrote a number of books on doctrine, theology, ethics and grammar. He wrote his famous work, a commentary on the Quran, when he was over the age of sixty, living in Sabzawar.

He had many students, most famous are his son Radhi ad-Din Tabarsi, author of the book Makarim al-Akhlaq, and Ibn Shahr-e Ashub. He was killed in the Oghuz invasion to Khorasan. The location of his grave is disputed as to it being within the Imām Ridhā Shrine complex or whether it lies in Mazandaran. The shrine located in Mazandaran was the location of the battle between the forces of the Shah of Persia and the Bábís, followers of the Báb, over the period October 10, 1848 to May 10, 1849.

== Work and contribution ==
Tabarsi had many works, but only around 20 of his books are survived to the present time. His main work is Majma‘ al-bayān (Compendium of Elucidations on the Exegesis of the Quran), a commentary (tafsir) of Qur'an. While Shia Scholars have written many commentaries of the Quran, none has been able to match the eloquence and magnitude of his book. He completed writing this book in the year 1139 AD. His other works are al-Kafi al-Shall and Jawami al-Jami.
