= Tafsir Nemooneh =

Book by Naser Makarem Shirazi

- Author: Naser Makarem Shirazi and others
- Original title: تفسیر نمونه
- Language: Persian
- Subject: Quranic exegesis
- Genre: Islamic literature
- Publication place: Iran
- Pages: 27 volumes

Tafsir Nemooneh (Persian: تفسیر نمونه, Persian pronunciation: [tæfˌsiːɾe nemuːˈne], literally "The Ideal Commentary") is a tafsir (exegesis on the Quran) written by Naser Makarem Shirazi and other authors working under his supervision in 27 volumes. The commentators are said to have targeted the contemporary era and related social issues.

The work is originally written in Persian, but it has been translated into other languages, including Arabic (الأمثل في تفسير القرآن al-Amthal fi Tafsir al-Qur'an), English, and Urdu.

The authors under the supervision of Makarem Shirazi include Mohammad-Reza Ashtiani, Mohammad-Ja'far Emami, Davood Elhami, Asadollah Imani, Abdol-Rasul Hassani, Seyyed Hassan Shoja'i Kiyasari, Seyyed Nurollah Tabataba'i, Mahmoud Abdollahi, Mohsen Qera'ati, and Mohammad Mohammadi Eshtehardi.
