= Majma' al-Bayan =

- Author: Al-Fadl b. al-Hasan al-Tabrisi
- Original title: مجمع البيان في تفسير القرآن
- Language: Arabic
- Subject: Quranic exegesis
- Genre: Religious
- Media type: Print
- Preceded by: Al-Tibbyan Fi Tafsir al-Quran

Majma‘ al-Bayan fi-Tafsir al-Qur'an (Arabic: مجمع البيان في تفسير القرآن) is a tafsir by the 12th century Imami scholar and author Shaykh Tabarsi.

This commentary is a comprehensive classical tafsir. Tabarsi was a man of great erudition. He was a master of Arabic and a noted theologian and jurist. The work is considered one of the most authoritative Imami Qur'an commentaries. Al-Tabrisi's method is to take up one group of verses at a time and discuss qira’at, language and grammar before providing a detailed commentary on the text, based on both Sunni and Shi‘i sources and incorporating his own views. His commentary for each passages are divided into five sections: introductory discourse, reading guide, language discourse, revelation and circumstances surrounding it, and meaning

Majma' al-bayan is written after Al-Tibbyan Fi Tafsir al-Quran and is clearly dependent on it.

Grand Ayatollah Mohammad Taqi al-Modarresi's Tafsir Hedayat, an eighteen volume exegesis on the Quran published in Arabic in Iran in the 1980s, is in part a discussion of Majma‘ al-bayan.
