= Tafsir al-Kabir =

Quranic exegesis by Fakhr al-Din al-Razi

Tafsir al-Razi
- Author: Fakhruddin Razi
- Original title: مفاتيح الغيب
- Language: Arabic
- Subject: Quranic exegesis
- Genre: Islamic theology
- Publication date: 12th century
- Publication place: Persia
- Media type: Print
- Pages: 32 volumes

Mafatih al-Ghayb (Arabic: مفاتيح الغيب, lit. 'Keys to the Unknown'), usually known as al-Tafsir al-Kabir (Arabic: التفسير الكبير, lit. 'The Large Commentary'), is a classical Islamic tafsir book, written by the twelfth-century Islamic theologian and philosopher Fakhruddin Razi (d.1210). The book is an exegesis and commentary on the Qur'an. At 32 volumes, it is even larger than the 28-volume Tafsir al-Tabari. It is not unusual for modern works to use it as a reference.

One of [his] major concerns was the self-sufficiency of the intellect. [...] [He] believed [that] proofs based on tradition (hadith) could never lead to certainty (yaqin) but only to presumption (zann), a key distinction in Islamic thought. [...] [However] his acknowledgment of the primacy of the Qur'an grew with his years. [...] [Al-Razi's rationalism] undoubtedly holds an important place in the debate in the Islamic tradition on the harmonization of reason and revelation. In his later years, he also showed interest in mysticism, although this never formed a significant part of his thought.

== Features ==
Mufti Taqi Usmani has written:

Just as Tafsir Ibn Kathir is the most concise and matchless exegesis from a narrative point of view, so also there is no parallel to Tafsir Kabir in relation to the sciences of Reason. Some people have passed a funny remark on this exegesis (In it, there is everything except exegesis). But the fact is that this remark is cruelly unjust to this book because this book has no equal in the interpretation of the meanings of the Qurān. The prominent features of this book are:

1. Imam Razi had written this exegesis up to Sūrah al-Fatḥ when he died. Hence, after this Surah another scholar Qāḍi Shahāb-ud-dīn bin Khalīl al-Khaulī, al-Damashqī (died 639 AH) or Shaikh Najm-ud-dīn Aḥmad bin Al-Qamūli (died 777 AH) completed it. It is so marvellously done and the style of Imām Rāzi has been so thoroughly maintained that anyone not aware of this fact would never suspect that this was written by someone other than Imām Rāzi.
2. The explanation, grammatical composition, and background of revelation, and all the narrations related to them have been described by Imām Rāzi in an organised manner with clarity and detail. Thus, the number of sayings in explanation of a particular verse are reproduced together and easily observed. In other exegeses, these discussions are generally scattered or disorganised, due to which it becomes time-consuming. But in Tafsīr Kabīr they can be found at one place and very well organised.
3. He has described the grandeur and majesty of the Qurān in detail.
4. The legal injunctions relating to a verse have been described with detailed reasons.
5. Any interpolations introduced by the erring sects and intellectuals in the meaning of any verse has been described in full and then refuted with detailed arguments. In this way it contains in it strong refutation of all the erring sects of his time, namely, Jahmiyyah, Muʿtazilah, Mujassimah, Ibāhiyyah, etc.
6. A very specific feature of Tafsīr Kabīr to which very little attention has been paid is the description of the link between the verses of the Qurān. It is a fact that the reason for a link and affinity between the verses as described by him is so casual, appealing and reasonable that not only does it impart a sense of satisfaction but also an ecstatic feeling of elegance and grandeur of the Qurān.
7. Qurānic injunctions and their mysteries and expediences have been very beautifully highlighted.

In short, Tafsīr Kabīr is a very concise exegesis and my personal experience is that whenever I have found a difficulty, it has guided me to the right answer. [...] However, certain things must be kept in mind in connection with this exegesis:

1. The narrations of Tafsīr Kabīr, like other exegeses, are a collection of strong and weak together.
2. Occasionally Imām Rāzi has adopted a view different from that of other commentators. For instance, he has rejected the authentic tradition [...] (Ibrahim did not tell a lie except on three occasions).

Mufti Taqi Usmani has also written in his autobiography:

The reality is that the systematic way in which Imam Razi (may Allah’s mercy be upon him) has presented Tafsir-related issues is unparalleled in any other Tafsir. It is true that he has elucidated upon Kalam-related matters in elaborate details, but he has done so after clarifying the Tafsir-related discussions, and this was also the need of his times. But this cannot be used to downplay the value of his Tafsir in any way. Especially with regards to the topic of the arrangement of the Noble Qur'aan and the mutual connections between its verses, his explanations are rather satisfactory most of the time.

Maulana Sayyid Muhammad Yoosuf Binnori has written in his article Yateematu-l-Bayaan that his reverend teacher Sayyid Muhammad Anwar Shah Kashmiri used to say:

Of all the difficult things in the Qur'an, I did not find any difficulty which Imam Razi had not dealt with. It is another matter that sometimes he could not present a solution to the difficulties as could satisfy the soul.

== Abridgements ==
1. Kashfu-l-Haqaaw'iqq wa-sh-Sharhu-d-Daqaaw'qq fee Tafseer Kalaam Rawbbi-l-'Aalameen (Al-Waadwih') by Burhan al-Din al-Nasafi Al-Hanafi (d. 687AH)
2. At-Tanweer fi-t-Tafseer - Mukhtasawru-t-Tafsseru-l-Kabeer by Nasir al-Din Shams al-Din Muhammad ibn Abi al-Qasim ibn Abd al-Salam ibn Abd Allah ibn Abd Ar-Rahman ibn Abd Allah ibn Muhammad ibn Sulaimaan ibn Abd Allah ibn Jamil al-Rabi’i al-Tunisi al-Maliki Al-Ash'ariyyah (d. 715AH)

== See also ==
- Tafsir al-Baydawi
- Tafsir al-Nisaburi
- List of tafsir works
- List of Sunni books
