= Tafsir al-Mizan =

Book by Muḥammad Ḥusain aṭ-Ṭabāṭabāʾī

- Author: Muhammad Husayn Tabatabai (b. 1321/1904 - d. 1402/1981)
- Original title: الميزان في تفسير القرآن
- Language: Arabic
- Subject: Qur'anic exegesis
- Genre: Islamic literature
- Publisher: World Organization for Islamic Services (WOFIS)
- Publication date: 20th century
- Publication place: Iran
- Media type: Print (Hardcover & Paperback)
- Pages: 20 volumes

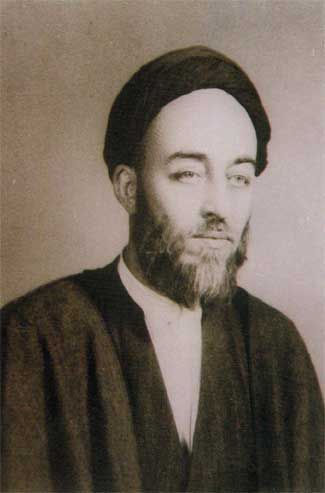
Allameh Sayyid Muhammad Husayn Qadi Tabataba'i :العلامة السید محمد حسین طباطبائی

Al-Mizan fi Tafsir al-Quran (Arabic: الميزان في تفسير القرآن, "The balance in Interpretation of Quran"), more commonly known as Tafsir al-Mizan (تفسير الميزان) or simply Al-Mizan (الميزان), is a tafsir (exegesis of the Quran) written by the Shia Muslim scholar and philosopher Muhammad Husayn Tabatabaei (1892–1981).

The book consists of 27 volumes originally written in Arabic. Up till now more than three editions have been printed in Iran and Lebanon.

== Method ==
This is the method that it can be named interpretation, Quran itself accepts it because Quran knows itself as "awareness to all things", then, how it cannot explain itself, Quran has introduces itself as mankind's guidance and right and wrong separator, it says: "a guidance for people, and clear verses of guidance and the criterion", then how is it possible that guidance, and clear proof evidence, and Quran (any sacred book), and light be in their all life needs, but in their most essential needs that is understand Quran itself, not to be guidance, not clear proof evidence, and not Quran, and not light? Quran has given glad tidings to all those who struggle in the path of Allah that He guides them in His paths. And He says: "those who struggle in our cause, we will surely guide them to our ways" (al-Ankabut:69), then don’t guide them in their effort that is understanding Quran? And what effort and Jihad is greater than trying to understanding Quran and what way better than way of Quran guides mankind to God?

— Tabatabaei, 1976,

Allameh Tabatabaei's method for interpretation of the Qur'an is the so-called Quran by Quran method. In his book Qur'an dar Islam ("The [place of the] Qur'an in Islam"), Tabataba'i discusses the problem of the interpretation of the Qur'an. Pointing to the interrelatedness of the Quranic verses and arguing based on some Quranic verses and Islamic tradition, he concludes that a valid interpretation of Quran could be achieved only through contemplation of all other related verses, and consulting Islamic traditions whenever it is necessary.

== Translations ==
Tafsir al-Mizan was translated into English (first 13 volumes out of 40) by author and renowned Shia preacher Syed Saeed Akhtar Rizvi. The rest of the translation work is undertaken by various translators and managed and funded by Tawheed Institute Australia.

== See also ==
- List of Shia books
