= Tafsir =

Exegesis of the Quran

A tafsir (Arabic: تفسير, romanized: tafsīr [tafˈsiːr]; lit. 'explanation') is an exegesis, or commentary, of the Quran. An author of a tafsir is a mufassir (Arabic: مفسّر; plural: مفسّرون, mufassirūn). A Quranic tafsir attempts to provide education, explanation, interpretation, context or commentary for clear understanding and conviction of God's will in Islam. The idea of the interpretation of the Quran first appears in the Quran itself, commenting on cases where it is clear and others where it is ambiguous.

Principally, a tafsir deals with the issues of linguistics, jurisprudence, and theology. In terms of perspective and approach, tafsir can be broadly divided into two main categories, namely tafsir bi-al-ma'thur (lit. received tafsir), which is transmitted from the early days of Islam through the Islamic prophet Muhammad and his companions, and tafsir bi-al-ra'y (lit. tafsir by opinion), which is arrived through personal reflection or independent rational thinking.

There are different characteristics and traditions for each of the tafsirs representing respective schools and doctrines, such as Sunni Islam, Shia Islam, and Sufism. There are also general distinctions between classic tafsirs compiled by authoritative figures of Muslim scholarship during the formative ages of Islam, and modern tafsir which seeks to address a wider audience, including the common people. (See also: Eisegesis)

== Etymology ==
The word tafsīr is derived from the three-letter Arabic verbal root of ف-س-ر F-S-R (fassara, 'interpreted'). In its literal meaning, the word refers to interpreting, explaining, expounding, or disclosing. In Islamic contexts, it is defined as understanding and uncovering God's will which has been conveyed by the Quranic text, by means of the Arabic language and one's own knowledge.

== Quantity ==
According to American scholar Samuel Ross, there are 2,700 Quran commentaries extant in manuscript form, and 300 commentaries have been published. Considering that around 96% of the Arabic-language manuscripts remain unstudied, Ross argues that "by extrapolation there may be thousands of additional commentaries still waiting to be discovered."

== History ==
A cedar in Lebanon (Lebanon's sacred tree); Translations made through modern Arabic, unaware of the socio-cultural background and etymological development of the words and symbols that make up the language, can turn Quranic Sidrat al-Muntaha into the Lote tree.

In Islamic tradition, the act of interpreting the Quran started with Muhammad, and after Muhammed died, this authority was transferred to his companions (sahabah) because of their familiarity with the language of the Quran, the social context of its revelation (such as the norms of the Arabs), and Muhammad's way of thinking. At this stage, tafsir was selective and concise regarding its coverage, and only certain words, phrases and verses were explained.

The written commentary tradition on the Quran began at a later time. Some traditions state that the earliest written tafsir was by Mujahid ibn Jabr (d. 722), although this is unlikely and the tafsir that exist in his name were compiled and redacted in later centuries.

The earliest commentary on the Quran that survives today was composed by Muqatil ibn Sulayman in the middle of the 8th century, back when the use of poetry, discussion of variants, and the use of the isnad was still rare in Islamic approaches to the Quran. In contrast to later commentaries, the bulk of Muqatil's commentary is made up of brief glosses on what the Quran says instead of offering detailed narratives. Some evidence suggests that Muqatil's commentary was the first one to explore the entire Quran.

By the time of the next generations ensuing the sahabah, scholars in the age of the successors (tabi'in) started using a wide range of sources for tafsir. The whole of the Quran is interpreted, and narrations are separated from tafsir into separate books and literature. Grammatical explanations and historical data are preserved within these books; personal opinions are recorded, whether accepted or rejected. During this time, a whole range of schools of tafsir came into existence in different scholastic centers, including Mecca, Medina and Iraq. Iraqi schools of tafsir came to be known for an approach relied on personal judgment aside from the transmitted reports, and Jewish apocryphal reports were also widely employed. Notable compilers on this age including Sufyan al-Thawri.

Until this age, tafsir had been transmitted orally and had not been collected independently in a book, rather, they had been gathered by muhaddithun (scholars of hadith) in their hadith books, under the topic of tafsir, along with other narrations of Muhammad. This indicates that tafsir, in its formative age, used to be a special domain within hadith. Widening of the scope of tafsir and emergence of mufassirun in the age of the successors lead to the development of an independent discipline of tafsir.

== Dating ==
Like hadith, reports in the Islamic exegetical literature are attributed to figures that predate the written tafsir. For historians, this raises methodological questions about how to determine the date of origins of individual exegetical opinions on the Quran. Andreas Görke has proposed several approaches and criteria for dating early tafsir. According to Görke, tafsir should be dated on a case-by-case basis, instead of by grouping entire books of exegesis as collectively authentic or inauthentic. Since first-century exegesis may have circulated orally or in teaching notes before becoming formal commentaries, Görke proposes beginning by looking at individual reports attributed to early figures. He positions this against two extremes: the traditional/sanguine view that early ascriptions are broadly reliable, and the skeptical view that isnads and early attributions are mostly later literary constructions.

The criteria Görke outlines are cumulative. A report is stronger if it has early or independent attestation in multiple sources, if the material attributed to a figure is internally consistent, if the interpretation is distinctive rather than widely projected onto many authorities, and if later authors preserve it even while rejecting it. He also allows isnads to help, but only secondarily: they should corroborate textual and historical evidence but not serve as the only basis for advancing a dating. Other clues for the date of a tafsir can include datable terminology, historical references, and signs of editorial intrusion. However, these secondary clues are difficult as they are rare or ambiguous when studying short reports. Görke argues that first-century tafsir already included legal reasoning, narrative expansion, biblical material, theological argument, variant readings, and cross-Quranic interpretation.

== Exegetical scholarship ==
An author of a tafsir is called a mufassir (Arabic: مُفسّر; plural: مفسّرون, mufassirūn). Mufassirs are required to master several disciplines such as linguistics, rhetoric, theology and jurisprudence before one can authoritatively interpret the Quran. In order for a commentary to be acceptable, the subjects that the commentator must first know in depth are listed as follows.

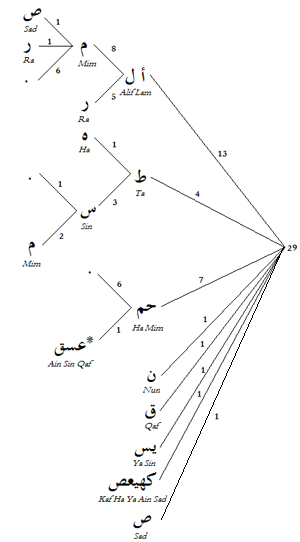
A tree diagram of the mysterious Quranic initial letters, labelled with the respective numbers of occurrences. To be read right to left.

1. Proficiency in the Arabic language and fiqh – known as ilm-ul-balagha, required to understand the syntax and grammar of the Quran, including nuances, expressions, and figurative language
2. Holistic knowledge of the Quran – The primary criteria is understanding and knowing the entire Quran.
3. Knowledge of context – a scholar must understand the historical context and circumstances of revelation (asbab al-nuzul) to interpret the text correctly.
4. Use of traditional sources (Quran and Sunnah) – tafsir al-mathur is the interpretation of the Quran based on higher and reliable authorities, including what the Quran itself says in other passages (intratextual analysis), as well as the Sunnah, or the interpretations that are believed by Muslims to have been passed down in the form of hadith from Muhammad himself or his companions (sahaba), or the generation after that, known as the successors (tabi'un).
5. Reason (Tafsir bi'l-Ra'y) – the independent reasoning of a scholar to understand and interpret the meaning of the Quran, often supported by other Islamic texts or scholarly consensus.
6. Fiqh (Islamic Jurisprudence) – understanding of Islamic jurisprudence (fiqh) and the methodology of legal derivation is needed to avoid misinterpreting legal rulings in the Quran and identify where which verses have been abrogated (naskh) by other verses.
7. Avoiding interpretations that contradict Islamic beliefs – any interpretation of the Quran must be consistent with established Islamic theology (aqidah).

== Methods ==
The methodology for the interpretation of the Quran in traditional commentaries can broadly be divided into two: commentary based on using received traditional sources about the context of a statement in the Quran, known as tafsir bi'l-ma'thur ('received tafsir'), also known as tafsir bi'r-riwayah, or commentaries based on independent reasoning, known as tafsir bi'r-ra'y ('tafsir by opinion'), also known as tafsir bi'd-dirayah.

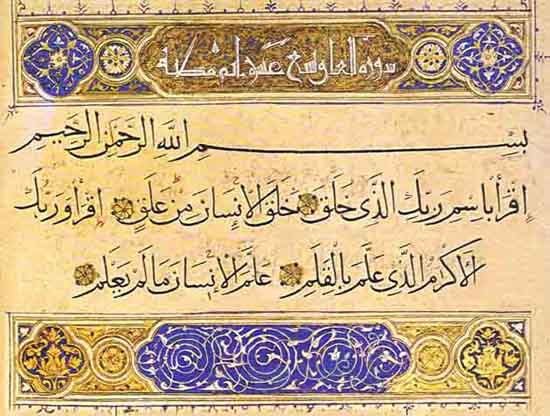
Believed to be Muhammad's first revelation, Sura Al-Alaq is placed 96th in the later Quranic arrangement. Translations of "al-‘alaq" shed light on how meanings attributed to the same text have evolved: while classical exegeses interpret the word as a "clinging clot," modern approaches translate it as "embryo." Furthermore, in C. Luxenberg's philological analyses, its meaning is rendered as "stickiness," connecting it to the clay mentioned in the Genesis creation narrative.

=== Using traditional sources ===
The approach of commenting on the Quran using traditional sources is known as tafsir bi'l-ma'thur. A more specific strategy, tafsir bi'r-riwayah, connotes using another part of the Quran, or the sayings of Muhammad or his companions (sahabah) specifically. Islamic scholars have widely adopted this method, and it has become the most common one in Quranic exegesis. Some important examples of tafsir bi'r-riwayah are Jami' al-Bayan by al-Tabari and Tafsir al-Qur'an al-'Azim by Ibn Kathir. The sources used for tafsir bi'r-riwāyah can be ordered by the rank of authority, as the Quran, hadiths, the reports by the sahabah and tabi'iun, classical Arabic literature, and Isra'iliyat.

Criticism of non-riwaya method is mostly based on two grounds; for one, Muhammad has condemned those who interpret the Quran from their own point of view, and for two, most companions of Muhammad have refrained from presenting their own ideas.

Interpretation of the Quran employing other Quranic reference is very common because of the close interrelatedness of the verses of the Quran with one another. The Quranic verses explain and interpret one another, which leads many to believe that it has the highest level of authenticity. Many verses or words in the Quran are explained or further clarified in other verses of the Quran. One example of the hadith which extensively employs this source of method is al-Mizan fi Tafsir al-Quran by Muhammad Husayn Tabataba'i. The authoritative source of method second to the Quran is Hadith, by using narratives of Muhammad to interpret the Quran. In this approach the most important external aids used are the collected oral traditions upon which Muslim scholars based Islamic history and law. Authority of this method is considered established by the statement made in the Quran that Muhammad is responsible for explanation and guidance. While some narratives are of revelation origin, others can be the result of reasonings made by Muhammad. One important aspect of these narratives is their origin. Narratives used for tafsir, and in general, must be of authentic origin (sahih). Narratives of such origin are considered requisite for tafsir.

Other source of the interpretation includes the accounts of the companions of Muhammad, or tabi'un, the generation after the sahabah, and Tabi' al-Tabi'in, the generation after the tabi'un. Their authority is based on an account in hadith Sahih Bukhari, according to which Muhammad said:

The best people are those living in my generation, then those coming after them (tabi'un), and then those coming after (the third generation).

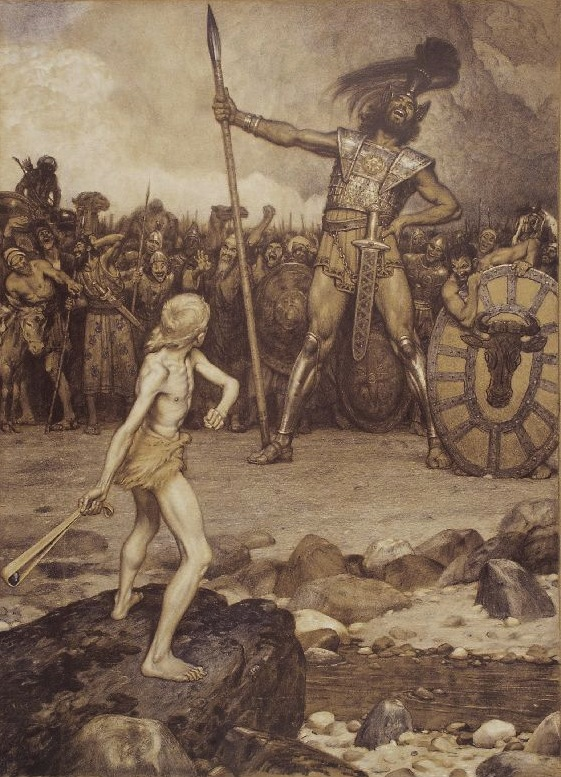
David and Goliath (1888) by Osmar Schindler, commentators transferred stories from Jewish history, mixed with legends, to Islamic culture, such as the details of the story of Jalut, briefly touched upon in verses 247-252 of Al-Baqara.

If nothing is found in the Quran or the hadith, the commentator has recourse to what the sahabah reported about various verses. These are generally considered above personal opinion, because these people grew up with everyday interaction with Muhammad, and had often asked about the meanings of verses or circumstances of their revelation; and they were very knowledgeable in both Arabic literature and Islamic thought. Another non-scripture based source of the interpretation is classical Arabic literature. Classical Arabic poetry and the text of the Quran are two resources which can be used as foundational reference in ascertaining the meaning and signification of the remaining literal and figurative diction of the Quran and its style of expression. Using Arabic poetry for defining words is a long used practice, and very few scholars have not used this source. Less authoritative source of the interpretation is Isra'iliyat, which is the body of narratives originating from Judeo-Christian traditions, rather than from other well-accepted sources. The Isra'iliyat are mostly non-biblical explanatory stories and traditions (Hebrew: midrashim) giving extra information or interpretation about events or individuals recorded in the Hebrew scriptures. Scholars starting with the sahabah have studied narrative accounts of other Abrahamic religions to further explain and clarify verses, especially parables, in the Quran. While some may be accurate, these narratives are not subject to hadith authenticity criteria, and are generally not favored for use.

=== Using independent reasoning ===
Tafsir bi'r-ra'y, or commonly known as tafsir bi-al-diraya, is the method of using one's independent rational reasoning and mind (ijtihad) to form an opinion-oriented interpretation. The most distinctive feature of tafsir bi-al-diraya is the inclusion of the opinions of the commentator, thus forming the more objective view on Quranic verses. The relative paucity of traditional sources is also a practical reason why the scope of the methodology is augmented. This is considered sanctioned by the Quran itself, as written in the surah Sad verse 29:

˹This is˺ a blessed Book which We have revealed to you ˹O Prophet˺ so that they may contemplate its verses, and people of reason may be mindful.

— Quran 38:29

This method is not interpretation by mere opinion however, but rather opinions must be based on the main sources. Performing Quranic interpretation using solely one's own opinion is believed to be prohibited by some Muslims. This is based on an authenticated hadith of Muhammad which states "He who says (something) concerning the Quran without knowledge, he has taken his seat of fire". However, this hadith can alternatively be interpreted to refer to the importance of first properly studying and learning the Quran before attempting to teach or preach it to others. Accordingly, the method of independent reasoning (ijtihad) has several qualifications and conditions that need to be satisfied. Due to the nature of orientation toward opinions, this method is rejected by certain scholars such as Ibn Taymiyyah, and prohibited by Wahhabi Islamic doctrine. Some important examples of such tafsirs include Anwar al-Tanzil by al-Baydawi and Mafatih al-Ghayb by Fakhr al-Din al-Razi. Some parameters used by these scholars including linguistic resources, historical sources, methodological concepts such as maqasid or socio-cultural environment taken into consideration.

In terms of linguistic resources, literary elements of the Arabic language, including morphology, eloquence, syntax are an integral part of tafsir, as they constitute the basis of understanding and interpretation. Arabic has a systematic way of shaping words so one can know the meaning by knowing the root and the form the word was coined from. If any word can be given a meaning that is compatible with the rules of grammar, Quranic text can be interpreted that way. In terms of historical resources, scholars may choose to interpret verses according to external factors, including their historical context and their place of revelation. Historical context (Asbab al-nuzul) is particularly important to interpret verses according to how the Quran was revealed, when and under which circumstances, and much commentary was dedicated to history. The early tafsirs are considered to be some of the best sources for Islamic history. Classification of the place of revelation, whether it was revealed in Mecca or Medina, is important as well. This is because in general Meccan verses tend to have an iman (loosely translated as faith) nature that includes believing in Allah, Muhammad, and the day of judgment, whether it be theological foundations or basic faith principles. On the other hand, Medinan verses constitute legislation, social obligations, and constitution of a state.

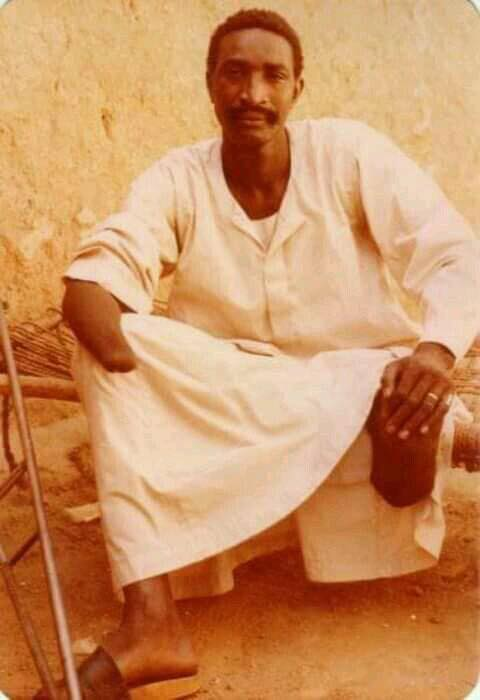
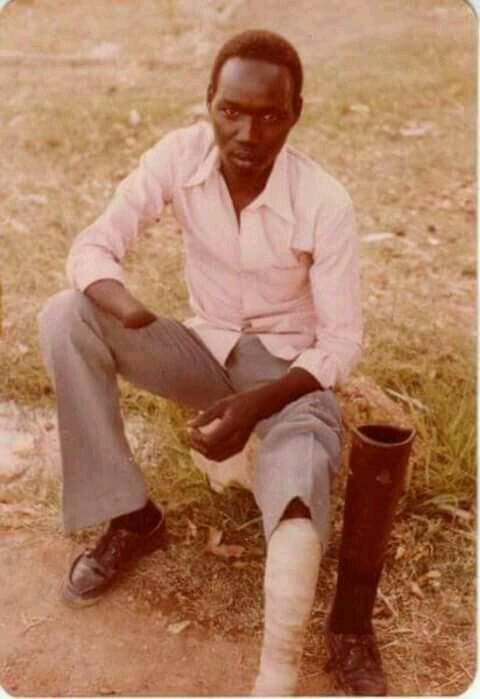
Cross amputation survivors, 1983 Sudan; A concrete manifestation of the hirabah penalty enforced under Jaafar Nimeiry’s September Laws, derived from a "literal reading" of Quran 5:33; illustrate the consequences of presenting the Quran as a timeless, immutable legal code, stripped of its historical context as well as the imposition of an irreversible, physical penalty for an abstract crime.

On the more conceptual level, the idea of maqasid (goals or purpose) can be taken into account. Verses may be interpreted to preserve the general goals of shariah, which may be considered simply as bringing happiness to a person in this life and the hereafter. That way, any interpretation that threatens to compromise the preservation of religion, life, lineage, intellect or property may be discarded or ruled otherwise in order to secure these goals. Further, the socio-cultural environment may also taken into consideration. This includes understanding and interpreting the Quran while taking into account the cultural and social environment to which it has been revealed; or according to the scholars' own time. Often than not, the distinction can be made between the 'amm (general) verses that aimed at universal conditions for Muslims, and khass (specific) verses that applied to specific conditions, time or need. This is considered an integral part of analyzing the universality of the Quran. Scholars usually do not favor to confine verses to a single time interval, but rather interpret according to the needs of their time.

== Denominations ==
Islamic theology is divided into myriad of schools and branches, and each of the schools' comments on the Quran with their own point of view.

=== Sunni ===
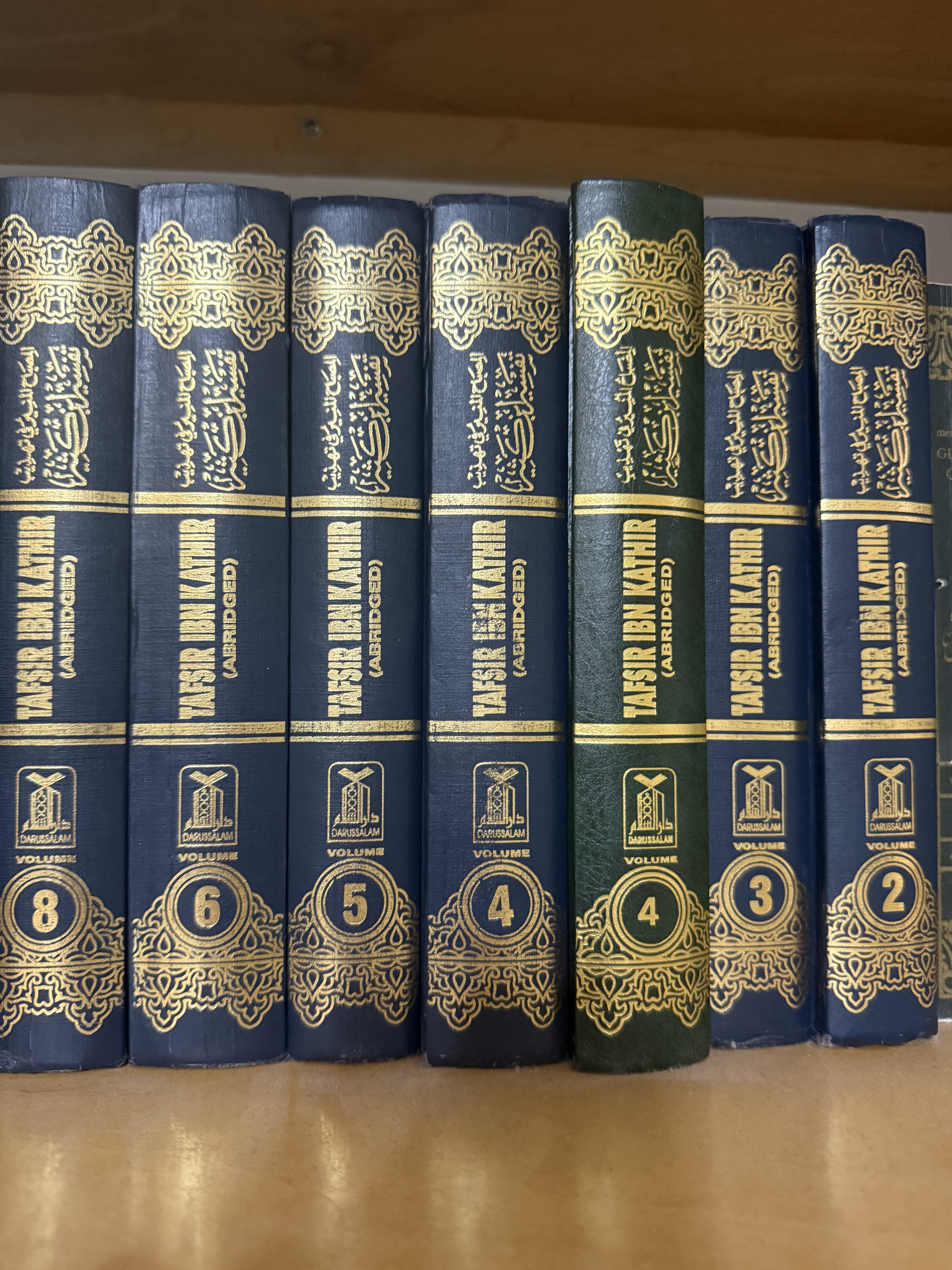
Volumes 2–6 and 8 of the Tafsir Ibn Kathir

The time of Muhammad ibn Jarir al-Tabari marks the classical period, which encompassed important Sunni tafsirs, such as Tafsir al-Thalabi and Tafsir al-Tabari. Tafsir al-Tabari is one of the most important tafsir works in Sunni Islam. This work provides exegetical material for the whole Quran, also contains conflicting information, which Tabari tries either to harmonize or argues in support of the one he feels more correct. Further he includes different readings, which according to him, both might be correct and gives his own opinion after each argumentation. Both linguistical and theological subjects are discussed throughout his work.

The period of Ibn Taimiyya is sometimes seen as a transition point between the Classical and post-Classical exegesis, due to his unique hermeneutic method. Tafsirs are genealogical, they rely on the core of previous tafsirs. Ibn Taimiyya challenged this core tradition by asserting that the Quran should only be interpreted by the Quran alone or the sunnah. Ibn Kathir was the first who tried to use the hermeneutic method of his teacher ibn Taimiyya. By that, it is much more selective and critical compared to earlier Quranic exegesis and features only a few personal remarks. Unlike his teacher, he also engaged with an analysis of the exegetical material. However, the works of both Ibn Taimiyya and Ibn Kathir were not widespread in the premodern period.

Al-Suyuti's (1445–1505) tafsir (al-Dur al-Manthur) uses a similar hermeneutic. Unlike ibn Kathir, his work is one of a few completely devoid of any personal comments. Yet, following the approach of Ibn Taimiyya, he is selective about the inclusion of hadiths. However, in contrast to Ibn Taimiyya and Ibn Kathir, his tafsir is without any personal comment. Further, despite using a similar methodology to Ibn Taimiyya and Ibn Kathir, he includes a wider range of hadiths. His commentary was well received and required for advanced imperial madrasas.

Not earlier than the mid-nineteenth century, the modern period of tafsir started. The modern approach is marked by a generally critical attitude towards much of the intellectual heritage of Islam, a declared intention to imitate the salaf, and an emphasis on the unity of believers and a unified understanding of Islam. Other features may include, attempts to proof the rationality of the Quranic worldview, compatibility with modern sciences, liberalism, literary criticism, and making the message of the Quran emotional relevant for the believer. Although such modern approaches became a standard only late, their ideas were much earlier present in the Islamicate world. Kadizadeli, a seventeenth-century puritanical reformist religious movement in the Ottoman Empire, shared a lot of ideas with modern Islamic interpretations. Al-Shawkani (1759–1834) has been understood retroperspective by many Muslim scholars as a salafi.

A rationalistic approach, as proposed by the nineteenth-century Muslim thinkers Syed Ahmad Khan and Muhammad Abduh, attempts to prove that the Quran and modern sciences do not contradict each other. This is close to the tafsir 'ilmi (scientific interpretation of the Quran), which claims that the Quran miraculously predicted scientific discoveries. Although this trend has existed prior to the modern era, its popularity is new. Nonetheless, this approach still faces a lot of opposition among Muslims. Yet another approach, represented by scholars such as Amin al-Khuli, aims to decodifies the Quran to understand its impact on the first audience. Accordingly, the focus is not about historical or scientific truths, but about conveying a message through the means of the Quran. Similarly, according to yet another trend, the Quran should not only be understood as for the first Muslims, but also executed as the first Muslims did. Famous adherences to this approach include Sayyid Qutb and Abul A'la Maududi. This approach often goes in hand with an attempt to establish a state based on an idealized Muslim society.

A number of exegetical works have entered English through translations and abridgments, including of the Tafsir Ibn Kathir and the Tafsir of al-Tabari.

=== Shi'ite ===
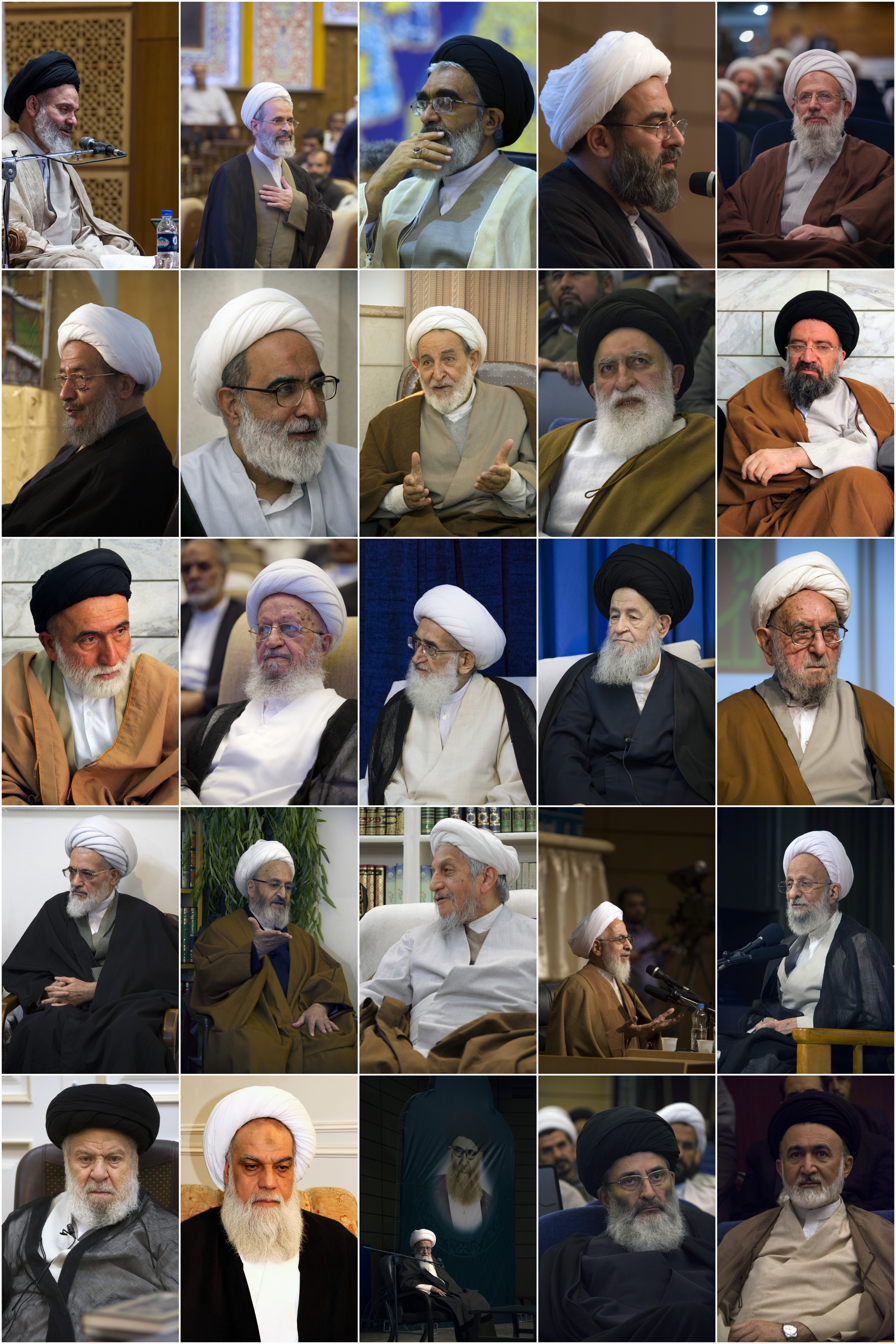
Grand Ayatollahs of Qom; The high class scholars in Iran who have the authority to interpret the Quran in Shia Islam used assertive titles such as Hujjat al-Islam, Ayatollah, Ayatollah Al-Uzma and gained tutelage over people and the administration

Tafsirs by Shia Muslims similarly deals with the issues concerned by Sunnis, and employs similar methodology as well, except for the adherence toward certain beliefs and creeds Shiism espouses. Distinctive features of Shia tafsirs include expounding of the concept of imamate, the heavier weight put on verses that considered to be the foundation of successorship to Muhammad within the Prophet's family begins with Ali, and the heavier authority put on interpretations attributed to The Twelve Imams. These characteristics result in distinction being made between the esoteric and the exoteric meaning of the Quran, and the esoteric meaning attributed to the imams preferred over the exoteric meaning. Certain Shia tafsirs are influenced by Mu'tazili thoughts as well, specifically on the theological issues. Some of the important examples of Shia mufassirs and their tafsir are al-Tibbyan Fi Tafsir al-Quran by Shaykh Tusi (460/1067) and Majma al-Bayan lif'ulum al-Quran by Shaykh Tabarsi (d. 548/1153).

On the other hand, tafsir by Zaidi school of jurisprudence, which espouses the doctrine closest with Sunnis of all Shia sects, produces tafsir resembling Sunni tafsir in its quality. Some Zaidi tafsirs are considered popular among Sunnis as well as shia.

=== Mu'tazila ===
The Mu'tazila tradition of tafsir has received little attention in modern scholarship, owing to several reasons. First, several exegetical works by Mu'tazila scholars have been studied as books on theology rather than as works of tafsir. Secondly, the large Mu'tazilite tafsir at-Tahdib fi tafsir al-Quran by al-Hakim al-Jishumi has not been edited, and there is no complete copy of it available at any single location, which limits its accessibility to scholars.

=== Sufi ===
It is an interpretation of the Quran which includes attribution of esoteric or mystic meanings to the text by the interpreter. In this respect, its method is different from the conventional exegesis. Esoteric interpretations do not usually contradict the conventional (in this context called exoteric) interpretations; instead, they discuss the inner levels of meaning of the Quran. A hadith from Muhammad which states that the Quran has an inner meaning, and that this inner meaning conceals a yet deeper inner meaning, and so on (up to seven levels of meaning), has sometimes been used in support of this view. Islamic opinion imposes strict limitations on esoteric interpretations especially when interior meaning is against exterior one. Esoteric interpretations are found mainly in Sufism and in the sayings (hadiths) of Shi'a Imams and the teachings of the Isma'ili sect. But Muhammad and the imams gave importance to its exterior as much as to its interior; they were as much concerned with its revelation as they were with its interpretation. These are generally not independently written, however, they are found in the books of Sufis.

Among the most significant Sunni Sufi tafsirs are:

- Tafsir al-Quran al-'Azim by al-Tustari (d. 283/896)
- Haqa'iq al-Tafsir by al-Sulami (d. 412/1021)
- Lata'if al-Isharat by al-Qushayri (d. 465/1072)
- 'Ara'is al-Bayan fi Haqa'iq al-Quran by Ruzbihan al-Baqli (d. 606/1209)
- Ruh al-Bayan fi Tafsir al-Quran by Isma'il Haqqi al-Brusewi (d. 1137/1725)
- Al-Bahr al-Madid fi Tafsir al-Quran al-Majid by Ahmad ibn 'Ajiba (d. 1224/1809)
- Tafsir Naeemi by Mufti Ahmad Yar Khan Naeemi (d. 1391/1921)

=== Quranist ===
Quranists merely believe in the Quran and reject other oral traditions. Turkish Islamic theologian Yaşar Nuri Öztürk denounced contemporary Islamic practices as altered. He distinguished between what he defined as true Islam and what he saw as customs and traditions introduced in the Umayyad period. In 1992, he published a 760-page, tafsir-like exegetical work called Kur'an'daki Islam. Each chapter, which deals with one surah, is structured around certain verses of the surah, or words occurring in the text, which need to be explained.

Edip Yüksel, Layth Saleh al-Shaiban, and Martha Schulte-Nafeh wrote Quran: A Reformist Translation, an English translation and commentary of the Quran. Yüksel is a follower of Rashad Khalifa.

Ghulam Ahmed Perwez wrote Mafhoom-ul-Quran, translated into English as Exposition of the Holy Quran.

=== Tafsir-ilmi (scientific interpretation) ===
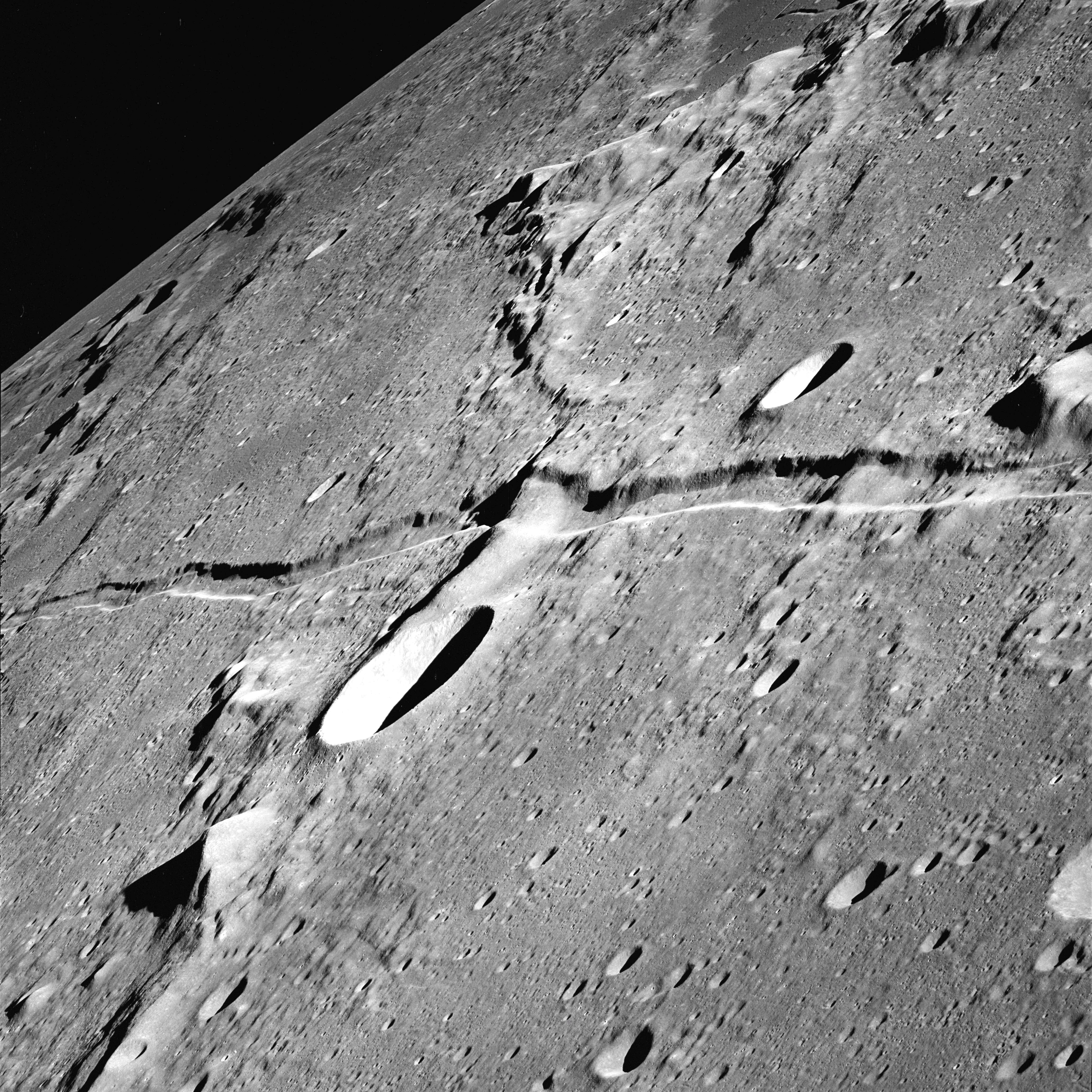
NASA photograph from Apollo 10 in 1969. Rima Ariadaeus, one of many rilles on the surface of the Moon, has been claimed on Internet forums to be evidence of the splitting of the Moon.

Hundreds of Quranic verses deal with natural phenomena and the inclination of man to approach nature and its signs. For some in modern times, this has been interpreted as encouraging scientific inquiry. Starting in the 1970s and 80s, the idea that the Quran possesses scientific facts only discovered centuries later became popularized as in ijaz (miracle) literature, also called "Bucailleism".

According to author Ziauddin Sardar, the ijaz movement has created a "global craze in Muslim societies", and has developed into an industry that is "widespread and well-funded". Enthusiasts of the movement argue that among the miracles found in the Quran are "everything, from relativity, quantum mechanics, Big Bang theory, black holes and pulsars, genetics, embryology, modern geology, thermodynamics, even the laser and hydrogen fuel cells". Critics argue, verses that proponents say explain modern scientific facts, about subjects such as biology, the origin and history of the Earth, and the evolution of human life, contain fallacies and are unscientific. As of 2008, both Muslims and non-Muslims have disputed whether there actually are "scientific miracles" in the Quran. Muslim critics of the movement include Indian Islamic theologian Maulana Ashraf Ali Thanwi, Muslim historian Syed Nomanul Haq, Muzaffar Iqbal, president of Center for Islam and Science in Alberta, Canada, and Egyptian Muslim scholar Khaled Montaser. Taner Edis wrote many Muslims appreciate technology and respect the role that science plays in its creation. As a result, he says there is a great deal of Islamic pseudoscience attempting to reconcile this respect with religious beliefs. This is because, according to Edis, true criticism of the Quran is almost non-existent in the Muslim world. While Christianity is less prone to see its Holy Book as the direct word of God, fewer Muslims will compromise on this idea – causing them to believe that scientific truths must appear in the Quran.

== See also ==
- Islamic studies
- List of tafsir works
- Quran translations
- Tafsir-ul-Quran Mahfil
- Verse of the Mustad'afin

== Sources ==
- Berg, Herbert (2003). "Competing Paradigms in Islamic Origins: Qurʾān 15:89–91 and the Value of Isnāds". In Berg, Herbert (ed.). Method and Theory in the Study of Islamic Origins. Brill. pp. 259–290.
- Cook, Michael (2000). The Koran; A Very Short Introduction. Oxford University Press. ISBN 978-0-19-285344-8.
- Gorke, Andreas (2020). "Criteria for dating early tafsir traditions: the exegetical traditions and variant readings of Abu Mijlaz Lahiq b. Humayd". Jerusalem Studies in Arabic and Islam. 49: 275–337.
- Leemhuis, Fred (1988). "Origins and Early Development of the tafsir Tradition". In Rippin, Andrew (ed.). Approaches to the History of the Interpretation of the Qur'ān. De Gruyter. pp. 13–30.
- Meri, Josef W., ed. (2006). Medieval Islamic Civilization. Vol. 2 L-Z, index. Taylor & Francis. ISBN 978-0-415-96692-4.
- Newman, Andrew J. "Shi'i Thought". In Meri (2006).
- Sinai, Nicolai (2014). "The Qur'anic Commentary of Muqātil b. Sulaymān and the Evolution of Early Tafsīr Literature". In Gorke, Andreas; Pink, Johanna (eds.). Tafsīr and Islamic Intellectual History: Exploring the Boundaries of a Genre. Oxford University Press. pp. 113–143.
