= Bayan al-Quran =

1908 book by Ashraf Ali Thanwi

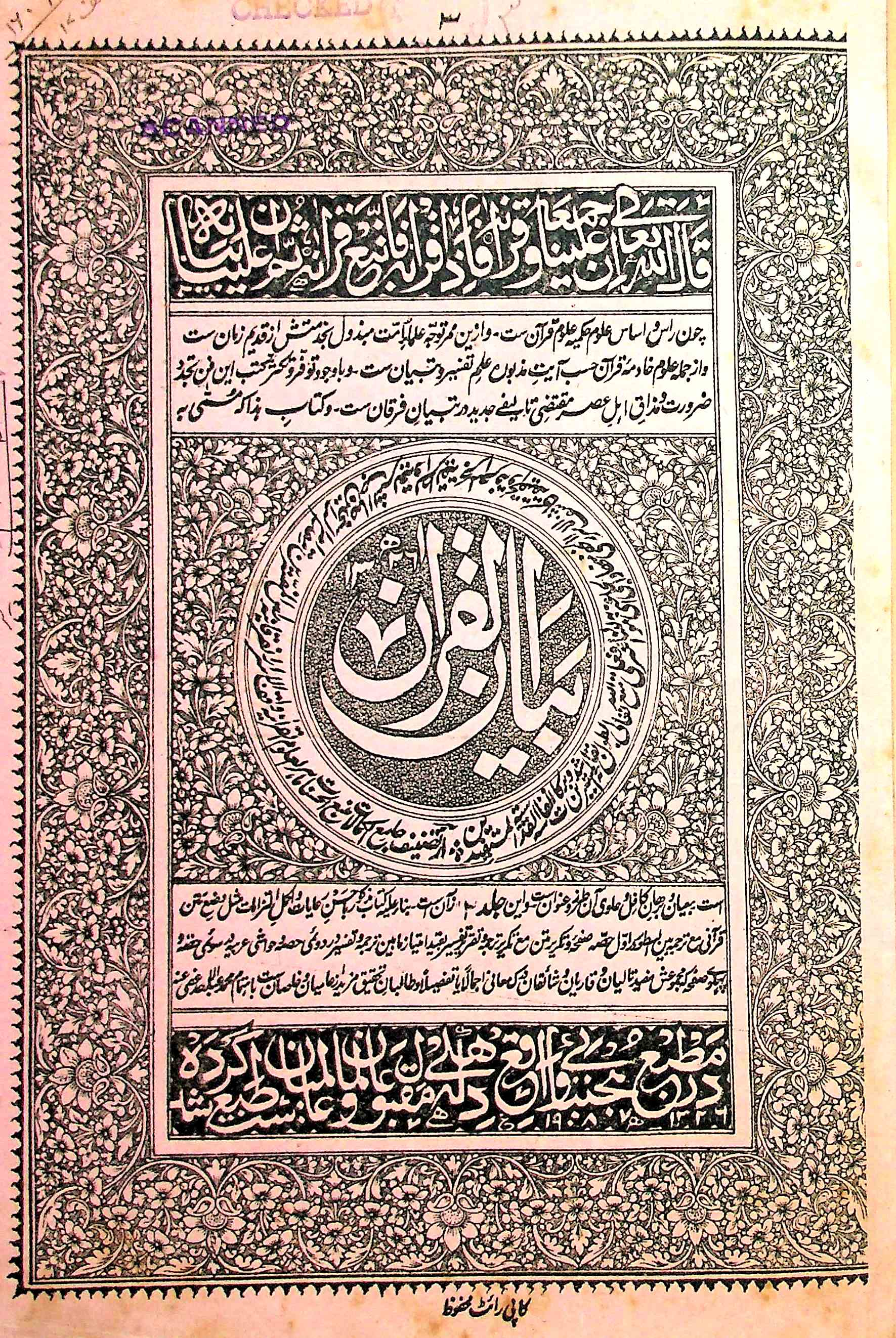
- 1908 original edition cover
- Author: Ashraf Ali Thanwi
- Original title: بیان القرآن
- Working title: Complete Bayan al-Quran
- Language: Urdu
- Subject: Tafsir
- Genre: Classical
- Published: 1908
- Publication place: British India
- English publication date: 2003
- Media type: Print
- OCLC: 977400306
- Dewey Decimal: 297.1227
- Text: Bayan al-Quran online
- In 1935, a revised version named Complete Bayan al-Quran was published by Ashraf Ali Thanwi.

Bayan al-Quran (Urdu: بیان القرآن) is an early 20th-century Urdu translation and commentary of the Quran by Ashraf Ali Thanwi, completed in 1905 and first published in 1908 in twelve volumes from Delhi. A revised version, titled Complete Bayan al-Quran, was released in 1935. Thanwi developed the work as a direct response to the translations and interpretations of Nazir Ahmad Dehlvi, Mirza Hairat Dehlvi, and Syed Ahmad Khan, whose approaches he disagreed with. The translation is influenced by the works of Shah Abdul Qadir and Mahmud Hasan Deobandi, while the commentary is influenced by Ruh al-Ma'ani. Its key themes include hadith-based interpretations, jurisprudential discussions, and mysticism. It also stands out as the first Urdu exegesis to explore the mystical dimensions of Quranic verses in depth. The translation and interpretative style of Bayan al-Quran were later adopted and expanded upon by scholars such as Abul Kalam Azad. It served as the primary source for compiling Tafseer-e-Majidi and also formed the foundation for Ma'arif al-Quran, a summarized version of this work.

== Print history ==
During Ashraf Ali Thanwi's era, interest in Urdu translations and commentaries of the Quran grew significantly. Factors such as the prevalence of unverified translations, the use of Persian in earlier works, the evolving nature of Urdu, and the general difficulty many Muslims faced in reading and understanding the Quran Influenced to this trend, ultimately leading to the compilation of Bayan al-Quran. At the time, translations by Nazir Ahmad Dehlvi and Mirza Hairat Dehlvi were well-known, while Syed Ahmad Khan had previously produced a translation and commentary. However, Thanwi viewed these works as containing elements inconsistent with Islamic teachings. In response, he wrote two booklets critiquing the first two translations. Concerned about these issues, he decided to undertake his own translation and commentary, a project also supported by his close associates.

Thanwi began his translation and commentary at the end of Rabi' al-Awwal 1320 AH. However, after completing only one-fourth of the first Juz', he halted the project for undocumented reasons. He resumed work in the middle of Muharram 1323 AH and, after two and a half years, completed it in 1905 CE. The first edition of Bayan al-Quran was published in 1326 AH (1908) in twelve volumes by Matba Nami Mujtabai, Delhi. Each volume included the translation and commentary of two and a half sections of the Quran. Initially titled simply Bayan al-Quran, the work received considerable recognition. However, after its publication, Thanwi reviewed it and identified sections he considered problematic.

Thanwi later noted that certain annotations in Bayan al-Quran had been modified without his knowledge during the finalization process. In response, he conducted a second round of revisions, personally reviewing and correcting the text to restore it to his original intent. The revised manuscripts were subsequently published by Ashraf al-Matabi' in Thana Bhawan. This edition incorporated two of Thanwi's booklets on the Quran, along with selected excerpts from his scholarly writings. Additionally, some of his marginal notes were included, with the term 'Muhashshi' (annotator) added to distinguish his annotations from other additions. Following these revisions, the title was changed to Mukammal Bayan al-Quran (Complete Bayan al-Quran). This updated version was published during Thanwi's lifetime on 20 Shawwal 1353 AH (1935) and continues to be available. In 1978, a photoprint reproduction of the original Thana Bhawan edition was issued by Maktabah al-Hasan in Pakistan. One distinguishing feature of this edition is the inclusion of a list of changes that Thanwi had approved in correspondence with Abdul Majid Daryabadi but had not been incorporated into the original text.

== Presentation style ==
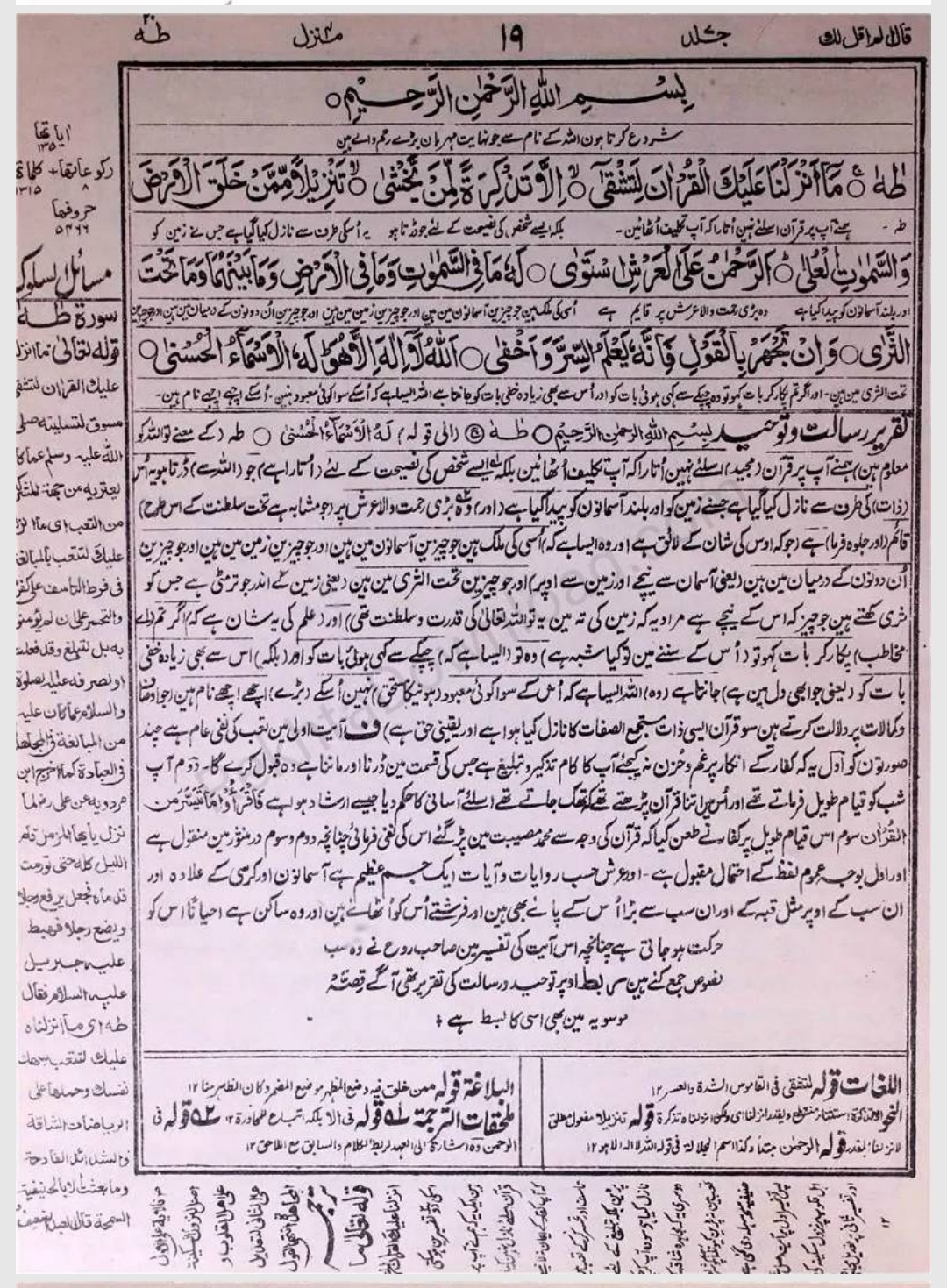
Excerpt from Complete Bayan al-Quran Featuring Beginning of Surah Ta-Ha's Translation and Commentary

The Urdu translation is integrated with the Arabic text, appearing between the corresponding Quranic verses. Following this interlinear translation, the author discusses the coherence between surahs or verses, either briefly or in detail, depending on the context. If a connection between passages is identified, an explanatory translation follows; otherwise, it is placed immediately after the interlinear translation. The commentary is structured into various sections, beginning with a brief interpretation under the heading 'Brief Commentary' before expanding on different topics through multiple subheadings. Two main types of headings are used: one categorizing Quranic themes and the other organizing subjects discussed in the commentary. Quranic themes are grouped under separate titles when multiple verses on the same topic appear together. Subject-based headings include 'Ihsaan and Sulook', which explores Islamic devotion and spirituality; 'al-Lughat', which analyzes key Quranic terms; 'al-Nahv', which examines syntax; and 'al-Balaghah', which discusses rhetorical elements in the verses. Differences in recitation are addressed under 'Ikhtilaf al-Qira'ah', while theological discussions are categorized under 'al-Kalam'. Reports attributed to Prophet regarding the interpretation of verses are included under 'al-Riwayaat'. Justifications for translation choices and grammatical analysis appear under 'Mulhigaat al-Tarjama', while responses to potential objections are provided under 'Hashiya' at the end of each commentary section. Each volume concludes with Wujooh al-Masani ma'a Taujeeh al-Kalimaat wa al-Ma'ani, a section that presents seven recognized modes of Quranic recitation, primarily in Arabic. Some volumes also contain supplementary treatises, such as Raf'u al-Bina fi Naf' al-Sama', which examines questions related to the function of the sky.

To ensure clarity, the translation is marked with a distinguishing line, allowing readers to differentiate between the Arabic text and its interpretation. The translation extends beyond the marked section when necessary, continuing beneath the term "Quran" when it appears. Citations from external sources in the Arabic margins include the names of referenced works, with the prefix 'min' (from) added if any modifications have been made. Certain references within the text, such as 'Ustaazi' (my teacher) and 'Murshidi' (my guide), indicate Yaqub Nanautawi and Imdadullah Muhajir Makki, respectively. When sources are cited, it is specified whether the content reflects the author's perspective or recollections.

== Commentary principle ==
Thanwi developed his translation of the Quran with consideration for contemporary readers. According to Rehana Zia, he employed 27 principles in his exegetical methodology. In Bayan al-Quran, Thanwi systematically arranged these principles to enhance clarity and accessibility, making the translation and interpretation understandable for both scholars and general readers. He maintained a balanced approach in his translation, avoiding excessive simplification that could diminish the Quran's distinctiveness while also steering clear of overly complex language that might impede comprehension. When addressing intricate theological discussions—such as those in Kalam, Fiqh, Nasikh wa Mansukh, Sarf (morphology), and Qira'at (recitation variants)—he included detailed explanations, referencing classical commentators. These technical notes were positioned in the margins in Arabic, primarily for scholars, as he did not intend for the general public to engage with specialized discussions. Thanwi adhered to the established principles of Quranic exegesis laid down by earlier scholars while also making modifications and additions when necessary, providing justifications for these changes.

His interpretative approach relied on cross-referencing Quranic verses and incorporating authenticated narrations from the Prophet, with a strong emphasis on the authenticity of Hadith. He carefully selected reports, assessed their reliability, and annotated his work with Arabic marginal notes. When authentic Hadith were available, he prioritized them over other interpretations. His methodology involved critically evaluating sources to ensure accurate attribution and contextualization within Quranic exegesis. He gave precedence to interpretations from the Prophet's Companions and early Islamic scholars, avoiding later perspectives that deviated from these foundational views. Legal discussions in his commentary were primarily based on widely accepted jurisprudential texts of his time, occasionally elaborating on specific rulings derived from Quranic verses, while fundamental theological and legal principles were typically included in marginal notes. As a follower of the Hanafi school of thought, he adhered to its methodology in legal interpretation, refraining from independent legal reasoning (ijtihad) and instead practicing taqlid (adherence to a school of thought) within the established Hanafi tradition. He also addressed critiques of taqlid, responding to arguments that questioned its validity based on alternative Quranic interpretations. While examining jurisprudential matters within the Quran, he conducted research within the necessary scope, ensuring that his analysis remained focused on exegetical concerns.

He minimizes engagement with philosophical debates and Israelite narratives in his exegesis, selecting a single interpretation when multiple views exist without discussing alternatives. In cases of divergence between rationalist and traditional scholars, he prioritizes textual evidence over rational arguments, accepting authentic narrated reports while interpreting non-authentic ones in a manner consistent with the text. His earlier volumes contain extensive discussions on theological debates, while later volumes primarily reference these earlier analyses rather than reiterating them in detail. He critiques the Mu'tazila and other sects in certain instances but does not engage in direct refutations of contemporary Orientalist perspectives. Following the Ash'ari and Maturidi schools in ta'wil (interpretation), he permits interpretative approaches while avoiding excessive speculation about the Divine Being (Dhat) and attributes (Sifat). Discussions on previous divine scriptures are drawn from Tafseer-e-Haqqani, and he did not personally verify these sections. His writings on Sufism and self-purification target a specific audience, as noted in his introduction. Among Urdu Quranic commentaries, his work systematically derives Sufi principles from Quranic verses, aiming to distinguish authentic Islamic Sufi concepts from external influences such as the doctrine of incarnation (hulul) and the idea of wahdat al-wujud (oneness of existence). He identifies approximately 1,600–1,700 Sufi principles from the Quran, and in the revised edition, two of his treatises on Sufism are included in the margins of the commentary: Masail al-Suluk min Kalam Malik al-Muluk, written in Arabic, and its Urdu translation, Raf' al-Shukuk fi Tarjama Masail al-Suluk.

In his exegesis, Thanwi explains the connection between each Surah and its preceding verses in a clear and accessible manner, with summaries provided at the beginning of most Surahs. For verses with interconnected themes, comprehensive headings are included to present an overview, allowing readers to grasp the broader context before delving into the detailed interpretation. The explanations are structured as a continuous discourse to maintain coherence. When translating the Quran into Urdu, he avoided regional idiomatic expressions, opting instead for a formal literary style to ensure broad comprehension across diverse audiences. Rather than narrating historical events in detail, he relied on existing sources, presenting his views alongside examples from various references to clarify his interpretations. If he faced difficulties in fully articulating an explanation, he openly acknowledged these intellectual challenges.

In addressing doubts and objections, Thanwi responded only to those based on valid evidence, such as Quranic verses, Hadith, or established facts. Objections lacking such evidence, relying instead on unsupported claims, were not directly countered, as the request for proof itself was considered a sufficient response. Topics that required detailed exploration and appeared in multiple places were discussed in one section, with cross-references provided elsewhere or a note indicating that further discussion would follow. In a few instances, Thanwi acknowledged that he had not fully resolved certain issues to his satisfaction. He explicitly mentioned these areas, inviting the consideration of alternative interpretations if they presented greater accuracy. Despite his scholarship, Thanwi maintained an openness to further inquiry, recognizing that his work was not intended to be the final or definitive interpretation.

== Cited text ==
Thanwi documented the sources he consulted while compiling Bayan al-Quran, listing several classical works on Quranic exegesis, linguistics, jurisprudence, and Hadith. Among the primary tafsirs referenced were Tafsir al-Baydawi, Tafsir al-Jalalayn, Tafsir al-Mahaimi, Al-Itqan, Tafsir al-Baghawi, Ruh al-Ma'ani, Tafsir al-Khazin, Tafseer-e-Haqqani, Tafsir Ibn Kathir, Al-Dur al-Manthur, Al-Kashshaaf, and Al-Qamus. Additionally, he examined various translations of the Quran. Thanwi also consulted works on Islamic jurisprudence (Fiqh) and Hadith, many of which are cited in the footnotes of his commentary. The Hadith collections referenced include Kutub al-Sittah, Musnad Ahmad ibn Hanbal, and Al-Jami' al-Saghir. In the field of logic and philosophy, he referred to the works of Mulla Sadra. His study of jurisprudential texts included Al-Durr al-Mukhtar, Bayan, and Sharh al-'Awamil. Thanwi noted that not all reference materials were available at the outset of his work. According to his own account, he acquired some texts before beginning the commentary, others while writing, and a few towards the final stages of completion.

== Literary reception ==
Scholars have recognized Bayan al-Quran for its clarity, comprehensiveness, and accessibility. Idris Kandhlawi described it as widely accepted, while Mohammed Parvez from Aligarh Muslim University highlighted its role in resolving interpretive complexities. Anwar Shah Kashmiri initially viewed it as a work for the general public but later acknowledged its scholarly value. Muhammad Mubeen Saleem from Aligarh Muslim University noted its adherence to the beliefs of Sunni Islam, and Sulaiman Nadvi emphasized its synthesis of earlier Quranic scholarship. Syed Shahid Ali mentioned its conciseness and multiple editions, while Abdul Majid Daryabadi regarded it as a significant Urdu commentary. Shahabuddin from Aligarh Muslim University ranked its translation among the most prominent after Shah Abdul Qadir's, recognizing its role in Quranic understanding. Abdul Shakoor Tirmizi noted its clarity in addressing complex interpretations, while Rehana Siddiqui highlighted its depth of research and scholarly precision. Muhammad Shafi suggested that only those with thorough knowledge of Quranic exegesis could fully appreciate its depth. Syed Mahboob Raza considered the translation straightforward and free from interpretive errors. Ahmad Saeed Jan of the University of Peshawar described it as one of the finest commentaries produced in the Indian subcontinent, while Yusuf Banuri observed that the author included many useful discussions, resolving intricate and obscure issues with clarity and grace. Bilal Ahmad Wani from the University of Kashmir and Muhammad Mushtaq Tijarvi emphasized its relevance in contemporary times, while Taqi Usmani described it as comprehensive and clear in interpretation. Asir Adrawi regarded it as a reliable Urdu commentary that concisely addresses scholarly complexities. Abdul Rauf Usmani from the University of the Punjab highlighted its smooth and accessible translation. Saeed Ahmad Palanpuri compared its scholarly significance with ten other tafsirs. The work's impact on later exegeses has also been noted, with Malak Shahid Kamran from Abdul Wali Khan University Mardan comparing it to Tafsir al-Jalalayn in the Urdu language, recognizing its influence. Saifur Rehman Rasul from the University of Sindh identified it as an important contribution to Quranic exegesis, while Rehana Zia viewed it as unique in its synthesis of interpretive methodologies. Uzma Khatoon from Aligarh Muslim University described it as a work that systematically addresses various linguistic, traditional, and legal perspectives in Quranic interpretation.

== Critical feedback ==
Rehana Zia noted that the commentary section is more beneficial for scholars due to its academic tone, incorporating extensive scholarly research and references in the footnotes. However, the translation section is more accessible and useful for the general public. Saifur Rehman Rasul emphasized that a strong foundation in Islamic sciences is essential for fully benefiting from the work. He pointed out that some of these scholarly requirements were not consistently followed, particularly in the first four volume, which experienced interruptions and inconsistencies in style and format compared to the later volumes. Muhammad Mubeen Saleem observed that Thanwi's defensive and counteroffensive approach to objections resulted in a language that may be too complex for the average reader, leading some scholars to create summaries of Bayan al-Quran. Syed Shahid Ali suggested that the language used reflects early 20th-century Urdu, which, while eloquent, may require revision to meet contemporary linguistic standards. Thanwi himself advised that non-scholars and students should not rely solely on their own understanding when reading his work, but should consult scholars to avoid misunderstandings. Syed Hameed Shattari criticized the work for being influenced by Sufism, claiming that it serves to publicize the author's doctrines.

== Legacy and adaptation ==
Front Cover of the 2019 Bengali Translation of Bayan al-Quran

Thanwi's efforts in Quranic translation and exegesis in Urdu have been widely acknowledged, with his work Bayan al-Quran recognized in the Urdu Encyclopedia of Islam. Known for its literary quality and clarity, it has been described as more interpretative and accessible than many other translations. His approach influenced later scholars, including Abul Kalam Azad, and shaped subsequent works in the Deobandi tradition. Abdul Majid Daryabadi cited Bayan al-Quran as the primary source for his Urdu and English translation, Tafseer-e-Majidi, while Muhammad Shafi described Ma'arif al-Quran as a simplified version of Thanwi's exegesis. Idris Kandhlawi, a student of Thanwi, began a separate work under the title Ma'arif al-Quran, completing 23 of the 30 juz' before his death. Several adaptations and abridgments have been produced, including Marajul Bahrayn by Salimuddin Shamsi, a modern Urdu translation based on the works of Thanwi and Mahmud Hasan Deobandi; a versified rendition by Majaduddin Asari; and summarized editions such as Khulasa Bayan al-Quran by Isa Allahabadi, Tasheel wa Talkhees Tafseer Bayan al-Qur'an by Wasiullah Khan Azmi Allahabadi, and Aks al-Qur'an al-Hakeem ma'a Tarjuma wa Tafseer Bayan al-Qur'an by Zafar Ahmad Usmani. Additionally, an anonymous summary, Qur'an Hakeem ma'a Mukammal Tafseer Bayan al-Qur'an, has been published, along with a Roman script transliteration titled The Holy Quran in 2014.

The translation of Bayan al-Quran has been made available in multiple languages. The first Bengali translation, Tafsir-e-Ashrafi, was published in 1962 in six volumes, followed by another Bengali version by Nurur Rahman in 1974, and a more recent edition by Muhammad Ismail Barisali in 2019. A Kannada translation was produced in 1966 by Darul Isha'at in Bengaluru, while an abridged English version was released in 2003. Thanwi's translation has also been incorporated into Arabic commentaries; in the 1970 Urdu translation of Tafsir Ibnu Abbas, Abidur Rahman Siddiqui used it for rendering Quranic verses, while Zahoorul Bari Azami included it in the Urdu edition of Tafsir al-Tabari, published by Darul Hikmat, Deoband. Additionally, Anzar Shah Kashmiri incorporated Thanwi's translation into his Urdu adaptation of Tafsir Ibn Kathir, published between 1962 and 1964 by Maktaba Faizi Qur'an, Deoband.

Academic studies have examined Bayan al-Quran in the context of Quranic exegesis in Urdu. In 1982, Rehana Zia conducted a doctoral research project at Aligarh Muslim University, resulting in a thesis titled A Critical Study of Bayan al-Quran: The Commentary of the Quran by Maulana Ashraf Ali Thanwi with Special Reference to the Exegetical Literature in Urdu. Since Bayan al-Quran is influenced by Ruh al-Ma'ani, Burhan Rashid from the University of Kashmir examined this connection in his 2019 paper, Impact of Tafsir Ruh al-Ma'ani on Tafsir Bayan al-Quran – with Special Reference to the Science of Balaghah. Ahmad Saeed Jan and Ashfaq Ali of the University of Peshawar jointly examined the role of Arabic rhetoric in Thanwi's interpretation, while Mohammad Izharul Haque Qasmi published an overall review titled Tafseer Bayanul Quran: Ek Jayeza under the auspices of the K. A. Nizami Centre for Quranic Studies at Aligarh Muslim University.

== See also ==
- Deobandi Quranic literature
