= Tafseer-e-Majidi =

1941 book by Abdul Majid Daryabadi

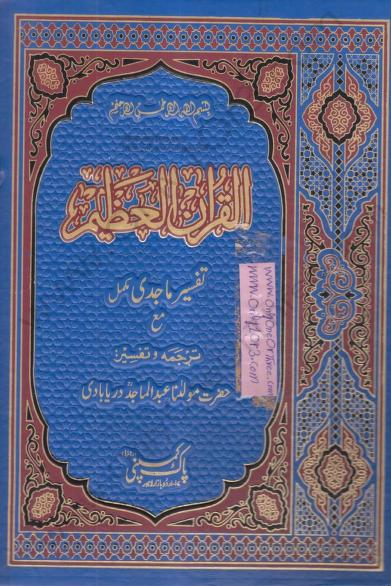
- Cover of Urdu Version
- Author: Abdul Majid Daryabadi
- Original title: Tafsirul Quran: Translation and Commentary of the Holy Quran
- Language: English & Urdu
- Subject: Tafsir
- Genre: Modern
- Publication date: 1941
- Publication place: India
- Media type: Print
- ISBN: 978-0860373605 The Islamic Foundation Bangladesh Version
- OCLC: 17557958
- Dewey Decimal: 297.1227
- LC Class: BP.109 1981B

Tafseer-e-Majidi or Tafsirul Quran: Translation and Commentary of the Holy Quran (Urdu: القرآن الحکیم) a complete Tafsir written by Abdul Majid Daryabadi. He was influenced by Ashraf Ali Thanwi to write a Tafsir and then he wrote this Tafsir in English first then in Urdu. The Urdu style and methodology adopted in writing this Tafsir were the same as his English Tafsir. The only difference was that this Tafsir was supposed to be comparatively more lengthy. The author himself wrote the Preface on December in 1941. The author observed that to translate the Quran is very difficult. So, he advised to the translators to follow the six main points and various subpoints to translate the Quran into English. Because he observed some problems to translate into English and he told that, there is no language in the world as well as Arabic. The Introduction was written by Abul Hasan Ali Hasani Nadwi on 16 August in 1981.

Daryabadi worked to study all researches, done in the West or East in past or in modern time, which confirm the verses of the Quran and he referred to them in his exegesis. He gathered materials about the Quranic stories, geographic places, individuals, nations, religions etc. as lots of materials have been gathered in one place. One of the other exclusivities of this Tafsir is that its author has studied comparatively the Quran and previous books, especially the Torah and The gospel. In the comparison, he unveiled distortions and additions in the Torah and The gospel. He responded rationally to doubts of sceptic minds of philosophers and some Muslim intellectuals who were influenced by Western secularism about some Quranic verses as the mind of reader accepts the Quran as a clear and fault free book with sound mind. It is the feature of this exegesis that it has utilized the modern science and new researches in service of the Quran without being influenced by absurd claims, baseless and so-called scientific slogans of Westerners. The most important feature of this exegesis is that it has presented a comparative study of the Quran and old divine books, particularly the Torah and The gospel; a work which had not carried out until that time by any exegete but by Daryabadi. The tafsīr is said to be generally: responding doubts of the time, using science in exegesis of the Quran, avoiding from eisegesis, comparative study of the Quran and previous divine books, adductive response to the misgivings of Jews and Christians, enjoying smooth and clear prose, proving the social system of Islam to the rest of systems etc. are among the most important features of Tafseer-e-Majedi.

== Background ==
Abdul Majid Daryabadi was a scholar in Islamic learning and sciences. He had contributed successfully in various subject of the Islamic literature and especially in exegesis of the Quran. It is his highest contribution to the study of tafsir literature in English and in Urdu. He had written tafsir in English (1933–1939) first. Then he had written tafsir in his mother tongue Urdu. It has highly been recommended to all of the Urdu speaking Muslims in India and Pakistan as well as his English. It was published in one set from Taj Company Limited, Lahore and Karachi, Pakistan. It was named Al-Quran al-Hakim, which is known as Tafsir-i Majidi and it was completed in total 1215 pages in one complete volume. The author, Abdul Majid Daryabadi himself has written a Preface of this tafsir. He has cited a number of books, from which he has been associated, like Arabic and Urdu exegesis, dictionaries in Arabic and in Urdu. He has been associated more to translate his Urdu tafsir from Bayan al-Quran of Ashraf Ali Thanwi.

The tafsir in English was written with the influence of Sirajul Haq MachliShahri. He knew very much about Daryabadis knowledge, personalities and good commanding in English language. Therefore, once he requested him to write a tafsir, which will be a modern and comparison of religions, because there is no English translation of the Quran for the Ahl al-Sunnah and whole Muslims. Then he had started to write this tafsir in English and taken six/seven years to write this tafsir from July 1933 to 1939. He has written this tafsir during the Second World War (1939-1945AC). He had written this tafsir by the suggestions of his several esteemed friends and scholars. It was completed with four volumes and was published first in 1941 by Darul Ishaat, Urdu Bazar, Karachi, Pakistan. On December, in 1941, the Introduction had been written by Abul Hasan Ali Hasani Nadwi and it had been published on 16 August, in 1981. Then it was published in 1991. The Author himself has written the Preface. In the preface, the Author has advised to the translators to follow the six main points and various sub-points about how to translate the Quran into English, because he has observed some problems to translate the Quran from Arabic into English. So, he has thought, there is no language in the world as well as Arabic. The first volume is started from Al-Fatiha to 82 verses of Al-Ma'idah. As if it is brief exegesis of the Quran but it is highly appreciated, admired, accepted and recommended. In the volume number 1, the pages are 454 and the index is 10 pages in addition. He had started to write this tafsir from 1933 and finished it in 1939 and published in 1941. It is titled Tafsir-ul-Quran: Translation and Commentary of the Holy Qurān and in Urdu, title is Al-Quran al-Hakim, completed in one volume. It was printed and published first in 1944 by Taj Company, Lahore, Pakistan. There is an appendix on Trade and interest after the end of Al-Baqara. It was written by Abul A'la Maududi, it is 2 pages in total, who was an editor of Tarjuman al-Quran, Lahore, Pakistan. It is related to the verse no. 275 of Al-Baqara. He has interpreted the verse under the footnote no. 141–152, end of the footnote no. 145, in addition, the readers have been requested to see appendix at the end of the Surah to learn details from this verse no. 275. In as much as, he has included an appendix on Trade and Interest, written by Abul Ala Mawdudi in the interpretation of the verse no. 275 of Al-Baqara, but he was a man of different school of thought. However, in his Urdu tafsir, there is no appendix on Trade and Interest by Abul Ala Mawdudi in the interpretation of the verse no. 275 of Al-Baqara, there is his own interpretation in the footnote no. 1066–73. In his Urdu tafsir, he included six articles, against the interpretation of verse no. 183 of Al-Baqara, those are published in his weekly magazine Sach, from Lucknow, edited by Abdul Majid Daryabadi, in several dates; first is on 3 April in 1925, second is on 3 April in 1926, third is on 26 March in 1926, fourth is on 3 March in 1928, fifth is on 14 March in 1927 and sixth is on 21 March in 1927. But in his English tafsir, there are no articles included against the verse no. 183 of Al-Baqarah. The verse no. 3 of the An-Nisa, in the footnote no. 498, he has requested the readers to see appendix on polygamy at the end of the An-Nisa. It is 4 pages in total, but well written and logical and natural and physical also. He has made three questions about polygamy. They are: (i) Is polygamy unnatural? (ii) Is it immoral? (iii) Is it irrational? Then he has positively answered and proved logically that the adoption of polygamy as a necessity and after the war the population was greatly reduced and there was considerable surplus of females, so, it was real phenomena that for dignity and security of females and save the society from wild like sexual activities. In addition, it is limited in four against the activities of Jews and Christian. However, in his Urdu tafsir, there is no appendix on polygamy against the verse no. 3 of Al-Nisa; he has interpreted the verse in the footnote no. 10 of the Surah.

The volume number II has been started from the verse no. 83 of Al-Maidah up to the end of the An-Nahl. There are 497 pages in total and the index is within 10 pages. There is no appendix in this volume. The volume III has been started from the Al-Isra' up to the end of the Fatir and the pages are 503 along with the references and the four appendices had been included. First of the four appendices is Seven Sleepers written by Abul Hasan Ali Hasani Nadwi and second is Identification of Dhu al-Qarnayn by Ali Nadwi. The third is Historicity of Haman as mentioned in the Quran by Sher Mohammad Syed and the fourth is Was Muhammad Literate? by S.G. Muhiuddin. He has introduced himself a broad-minded personality for including others articles, related to the interpretation of the verses of the Quran in his tafsir.

The volume number IV is the last one; it has been started from Ya-Sin up to the Al-Nas, the end of the Quran. The pages are 543, a bibliography of 4 pages had been included, and an index is in 10 pages. The number of footnotes in all the earlier volumes began and ended with a part (Para) of the Quran. As, however, the third volume was terminated with the Al-Fatir, a portion of Yasin, which has been included in part XXII, had to be brought out into this volume. Consequently, the footnotes begin with the Yasin and continue into part XXIII. In subsequent parts, the usual practice of giving the footnotes by Quranic Paras has been followed. Then the number of footnotes was begun with part XXIV and continued at the end of the part XXIV. There is no appendix in this volume.

=== A unique preface ===
The unique preface was written by the author himself on December in 1941. The introduction was written by Abul Hasan Ali Hasani Nadwi on 16 August in 1981. Here is a long distance between preface and introduction, 40 years after Abul Hasan Ali Hasani Nadwi has written an Introduction on Daryabadis tafsir in English. It was published in 1991 as First Edition. Although it is a brief exegesis of the Quran, but it is a highly appreciated, admired, accepted and recommended tafsir to all. In addition, the author has interpreted many verses of the Quran in the light of comparative religion. In his Urdu tafsir, he has also written a preface, but it is different from the preface of his English tafsir. In it, he has discussed elaborately. He had revised the first part of his tafsir in December 1944 and in October 1946, he has finished revision of the five parts of the Quran.

== Methodology ==
=== In the light of other verses of the Quran ===
When an interpreter of the Quran starts to interpret then it is considered to interpret by the other verses of the Quran first as the foremost source for interpreting the Quran. Daryabadi has applied it mainly in linguistic and legislative explanations of the Quran.

=== In the light of Sunnah ===
Most of the verses of the Quran have been explained based on what the Companions of Muhammad had learnt from Muhammad as to the explanation of the Quran. In 2:187 verse, he has proved that what is the purpose of marital act? In addition, everyone wants his successors and his future generation. So, he said that the word "rafasu" is used against the Birth control. He opposed the systems created up to 1943. In addition, he opined against the "azle". He has said that every couple must have patience to wait for the natural result of sexual intercourse. Because, the meaning of the above word is in favour of upcoming off spring. He has cited the sayings of Muhammad in his tafsir in Urdu, he said, "Get marry to fertile and attractive women". He has interpreted the verses with the point of view of Muhammad. But the author did not mention isnad (chain of authorities) of the quoted hadith and often remained satisfied with mentioning the name of only one Rāwī who related hadith directly from Muhammad. This had it has not been mentioned in his tafsir in English. In the most cases, the author did not mention the sources from which he collected the hadith. He has written some conditions to receive contraceptive methods for controlling the birth. In the verse no.133 of Al-Baqara, Allah stated the situation before the death of Yaqub (Jacob); "Were you witnesses when death presented itself to Yaqub, and when he said to his sons: what will you worship after me? They said: we shall worship thy God, the God of thy father, Ibrahim and Ismail and Ishaq the one and only God, and to Him we are submissive." Here he interpreted the word "abaika" that means 'your father', Ishmael was a brother of Yaqub but his sons addressed him as father. Daryabadi said that Muhammad also addressed father to his fathers brother Abbas. He said Muhammad said, "You are rest of my fathers" to his paternal uncle Abbas.

=== In the light of sayings of Sahabah and Tabiun ===
Companions of Muhammad (Sahabah) knew the system of the revelation of the Quran and witnesses the background of the events when the different verses were revealed. So, their interpretation of the verses of the Quran is canonical and acceptable to the Ulama. In this reason Al-Tabari, Al-Maturidi, Ibn Atiyah al-Andalusi, Ibn Kathir, Al-Saalabi, Al-Suyuti have given importance the sayings of Sahabah and Tabi'un side by side the verses of the Quran and Hadith. In this method, Daryabadi followed in his Tafsir. In example, Allah says, "And re-call when we appointed the House a resort to mankind and a place of security, and said, take the station of Ibrahim for a place of prayer. And we covenanted with Ibrahim and Isma il saying: purify you twain My House for those who circumambulate it and those who will stay and those who will bow down and prostrate themselves."

In this verse, the meaning of "Maqam Ibrahim" is that stone, standing on which Ibrahim built the House of Allah, and at present the stone has been preserving in a small room at a distance of few feet from the Kaaba. In front of this room, to pray two rakats are compulsory in the light of Hanafi and Maliki school and sunnah in the light of Shafiis school. But some of the Sahabah and Tabiun think that it means whole Kaaba, that means all sceneries and all mash hads. He interpreted with the reference of Sahabah and Tabiun; Here Ibn Abbas is a famous Sahabah and Mujahid ibn Jabr and Ata are from Tabiun.

=== In the light of renowned previous Tafsir ===
Daryabadis Tafsir is an authentic and source reliable. In his Tafsir, he has taken sources from contemporary and previous Tafasir for authenticating his speech and interpretation. The sources of Tafsir-ul-Quran and in Urdu Tafsir-i Majidi have been mentioned by the author himself at various places in the tafsir and cited in his preface. To translate the Quran, he has taken help from Bayan al-Quran of Ashraf Ali Thanwi. He expressed that he has taken help from some traditional sources of tafsirs in Arabic and Urdu. They are; Tanwir al-Miqbas written by Ibn Abbas (d.78 AH), Tafsir al-Tabari written by Al-Tabari (d.310 AH), Al-Kashshaaf written by Al-Zamakhshari (d.815AH), Tafsir al-Razi written by Fakhr al-Din al-Razi (d. 606AH), Tafsir al-Baghawi written by Al-Baghawi (d. 516AH), Tafsir-i Ibn Kathir written by Ibn Kathir (d. 774AH), Tafsir-i Madarik written by Abu Hafs Umar al-Nasafi (d. 686AH), Tafsir al-Baydawi written by Qadi Baydawi (d.791AH), Al-Bahr al-Muhit written by Abu Hayyan al-Gharnati (d. 654AH), Tafsir Abi Saud written by Abu Saud Imadi, Tafsir al-Alusi written by Mahmud al-Alusi (d.1291AH), Tafsir al-Jalalayn, Al-Mufradat fi Gharib al-Quran, Tafsir Fath al-Qadir written by Al-Shawkani, Tafsir-i Khazin etc. Except above these tafsirs, he has associated from others in the subject of Islamic jurisprudence. Specially those are; Tafsir al-Qurtubi written by Al-Qurtubi (d. 573AH), Ahkam al-Quran written by Al-Jassas (d. 370AH), Tafsir-i Ahmadi written by Ahmad Jiyun Amitahwi. It had been written in 1075AH, Al-Mufradat fi Gharib al-Quran written by Al-Raghib al-Isfahani (d. 502AH). He had actually benefited more from above those traditional Arabic Tafsirs. However, he had conditional knowledges, potentialities and qualities to interpret the Quran. However, he had not taken help from the tafsir bi al-ray. His tafsir in English is a unique one, because he did not follow the western translator of the Quran and exegete the Quran in the light of comparative religious study. So, his translation and interpretation are different from others. Abu Nasar Mohammad Abdul Mabood, Professor of University of Chittagong wrote that, "As I have gone through his tafsir in English and in Urdu, Daryabadi had adopted methods as follows; Often he quoted interpretation from the work mentioning him or his tafsir. Sometimes he quoted exegesis from the various ancient famous tafsir and the religious books. The books, which has been written by renowned western writers mentioning him or his tafsir as the source, but he did not comment on his interpretation."

=== In the light of own thoughts ===
Through this method, what the early exegetes really wanted to achieve was an explication of those parts of the Quran which were not brought to Muhammad's attention. This method had been employed mostly by the Companions and the Successors, as it is commonly known that many of them exerted their personal judgment in fathoming the meaning of several verses, to which they did not receive any transmission or explanation from Muhammad. However, after the development of Islamic theology, the method of tafsir bi al-ray has been gradually deviated from the sound to the unsound usage of ray. Allah said, "And the Jews and the Nazarenes say, We are the children of God and His loved ones".

He has interpreted in this verse that, it is their religious believe in sense of a race or community. He has quoted more from their religious books about their belief that they are the sons of God and His loved ones. In his Urdu tafsir, he has interpreted that, it has been told due to their status and closest to God. He has exampled that in Hindus of this sub-continent as same as Brahman and Rajput and as well as in Muslim community, it has been called as same as Pirzada, Mashayikhzadah, Makhdumzadah, these words are used in the same mentality and same point of view of the Jews and the Nazarenes. He has made an example like above the customs in the people of Indian subcontinent; he has interpreted the verses of the Quran in his Urdu tafsir but not in his English tafsir. It has been observed that he has written tafsir first in English, then in Urdu in his mother tongue, and during his decision to write a tafsir in Urdu, in that time people of this subcontinent hugely adopted in this customs. It was the time of World War II from 1939 to 1945.

=== In the light of geography, history, Israiliyats and archaeology ===
Daryabadi has interpreted some historical verses in the light of geography and archaeological evidence. The example is below; "And recall when we separated for you the sea and delivered you and drowned Firawns house while you looked on". In this verse, he interpreted that it was not an event of against the laws of nature. It was an action of earthquake on the sea. On 15 January in 1934, he has cited a real example in his tafsir, which was observed at the city of Patna at 2 p.m. in India, in a broad daylight at a few minutes. Which was witnessed by many people of India, as same as which was happened in the Red Sea of Egypt between the Musa (Moses) and Firawn (King of Egypt). He interpreted the word "Al-bahr" is Red Sea. He commented that the wrong interpretation against the word River Nil by the some Mufassirs. He cited that the time of the event of Firawn is about 15th century BC. However, some of interpreter of the Quran interpreted bravely that it may be 1447 BC. In addition, the event of drowned the Firawns with his group in Red Sea was written in the Tawrat (Ex. 14: 2130). In his tafsir, he interpreted the verses of the Quran on geography elaborately. He discussed and interpreted about the concept of geography and the scenery of the natural land uncontestly and newly. There is no example but he is the example of him.

He expressed that the verse of the Quran; "Say thou; go about in the land and see how has been end of the beliers". Therefore, without traveling the world how we can follow the above verses of the Quran. Another verse of the Quran; "Verily in the creation of the heavens and the earth and in the alternation of the night and the day are signs for men of understanding". He has interpreted on this verse that "The heavens and the earth are all created beings, and there is no such thing as a Sky-god or an Earth-god, as held by several polytheistic religions. In the Hindu cosmology, for instance, both Heaven and Earth are regarded as gods and as the parents of god even though they are said to have been generated by gods." If we want to understand to the verse we have to gather the knowledge of nature and revealed, he said. So, that of the knowledge has to prove that the geographic authenticity needs an authentic references and witnesses, like the creation of the rivers and the forest, the trees and the stones, the solid and the soft, the botany and the zoology. There is a discussion about them in the Quran. To open the knowledge of science for analyzing the reality of these matter. He has not thought that the geography is a separate and important subject, but he has taken it an analytical and synthesis subject. Besides of his tafsir, He has written a book on this subject titled; "Quranic Geography". It has been published in 1955AH.

However, many writers of India have written books on this subject, like Sulaiman Nadvi and Intezam Ullah Shihabi. But the book of Daryabadi is a unique than other because it is very much methodological. He had benefited from the book of Sulaiman Nadvi and the other books; those have been written in English. He has analyzed geography of the Quran with the help of Israelites. Like the Kingdom of Saba, he has written about the Kingdom that is called now Yemen. He has discussed about geography of the Quran in his book named; Traveling to Hijaz very much attractively. In that book he has discussed about hills, rivers, waterfalls, forest, a sandy desert etc. and he has discussed about the culture of that area and their life style. He has written, "…to know not only the Quraysh, but the social culture of Arab has to know very well, their faith and custom, fears and confident, poetry and style of speech etc. so, to have experience to interpret above the matter and to earn knowledge about these manners.

An interpreter of the Quran has to know what the position of woman in politics, social was and what were their rights"? In his tafsir, he interpreted the verses of the Quran on History with happened evidence in India in the river Ganges. In the Quran, Allah says, "And recall when we separated for you the sea and delivered you and drowned Firawns house, while you looked on." He has interpreted the verse mentioned above with an instance a similar event happened on smaller scale, the cleavage of water and made a path on the river Ganges on 15 January in 1934 AC/ Ramadan, 1352AH in the area of Bihar and the near, in the city of Patna in India. It was an earthquake at the time of 2:30 pm. The event was stabled 4 or 5 minutes in the eyes of the people gathered. The news of this event was published in the daily English The Pioneer from Lucknow on 20 January in 1934AC. It was well reported in the daily press of India.

=== In the light of philology and grammar ===
He has interpreted in the verses of the Quran in the light of Philology. In the verse no. 26 of Surah Baqarah, he has written that the word "fasiq" is used first time in the Quran. However, before Jahiliyyah, this word is not used in Arabic language. The word "fasiq" is not used in Arabic literature, even in the Arabic poem and poetry. He quoted, Therefore, Allah has included a new word in the Arabic language. He said, "Many He sends astray thereby and many He guides thereby, and He sends not astray thereby any accept the transgressors". However, it is a word of pure Arabic language, but it was used against the solid things not in the human being. He quoted, We have learnt from above this discussion that the Quran adopted new words in Arabic language and enriched the language. In the verse no. 105 of Surah al-Baqarah, he rejected the other translation of this verse. He claimed that the translation of this verse by other is not grammatically correct but his translation is correct grammatically and in sense of the Quran. Allah says, Daryabadi translated this verse; "Those who disbelieve, be they of the people of the Book or of the associators do not like that aught of good should be sent down you from your lord." Moreover Abdullah Yusuf Ali translated this verse; "It is never the wish of those without faith among the people of the Book, nor of the Pagans, that anything good should come down to you from your lord." He explained that "al-musriqin" is grammatically coupled with "ahle-kitab" and is, in the objective case, governed by the preposition ِٓ not in the nominative and coupled with "allajina kafaru" as rendered by most of the English translators. His argument is relyable and grammatically proved. He wrote that here the Jews are meant in particular.

== Reception ==
Abul Hasan Ali Hasani Nadwi, Chairman of Oxford Centre for Islamic Studies wrote, "Undoubtedly unique and most acceptable among all the exegetical renderings of the Holy Quran attempted so far in the English language."

== Translations ==
=== Bengali ===
Cover of Bengali translation by Islamic Foundation Bangladesh.

The complete Tafseer-e-Majidi have been translated into Bengali by Obaidur Rahman Mallick and published from Dhaka by Islamic Foundation Bangladesh in 1994.

== See also ==
- List of tafsir works
- List of Sunni books
