= Encyclopaedia of Islam =

English reference work series (1913-present)

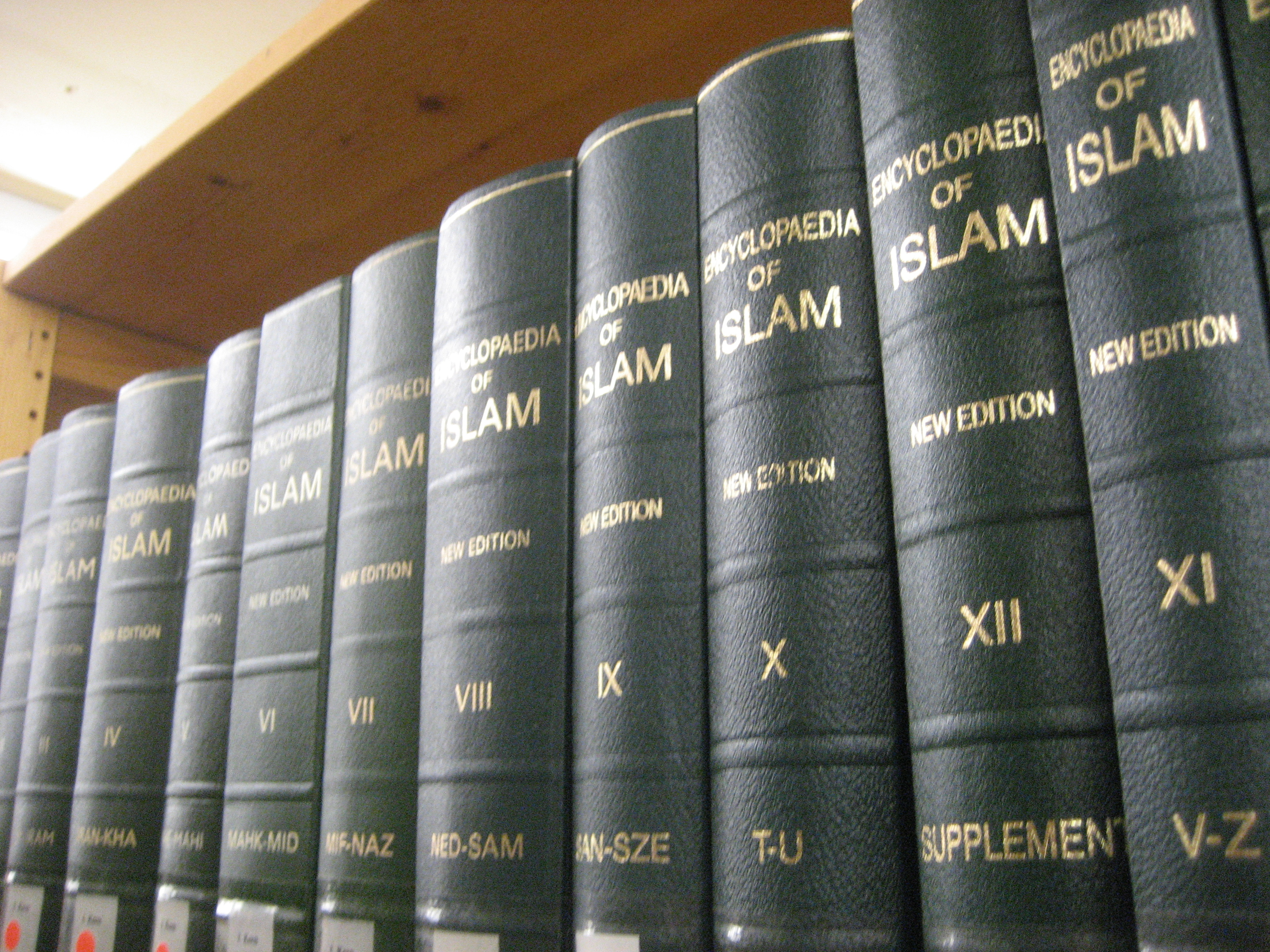
- Encyclopaedia of Islam, Second Edition
- Editor: Martijn Theodoor Houtsma (First Edition); P. Bearman, Th. Bianquis, C.E. Bosworth, E. van Donzel, W.P. Heinrichs (Second Edition); Kate Fleet, Gudrun Krämer, Denis Matringe, John Nawas, Everett K. Rowson (Third Edition)
- Author: Various scholars
- Language: English, French, and German (First Edition); English (Second and Third Edition)
- Subject: Islam, Islamic studies
- Genre: Reference work
- Publisher: Brill
- Publication date: 1913–1938 (First Edition); 1954–2008 (Second Edition); 2007–present (Third Edition)
- Publication place: Leiden, Netherlands
- Media type: Print (All editions); Online (Third Edition)

The Encyclopaedia of Islam (also French: Encyclopédie de l'Islam and German: Enzyklopädie des Islām; EI is a common abbreviation in all three languages) is a reference work that facilitates the academic study of Islam. It is published by Brill and provides information on various aspects of Islam and the Islamic world. It is considered to be the standard reference work in the field of Islamic studies. The first edition was published in 1913–1938, the second in 1954–2005, and the third was begun in 2007.

== Content ==
According to Brill, the EI includes "articles on distinguished Muslims of every age and land, on tribes and dynasties, on the crafts and sciences, on political and religious institutions, on the geography, ethnography, flora and fauna of the various countries and on the history, topography and monuments of the major towns and cities. In its geographical and historical scope it encompasses the old Arabo-Islamic empire, the Islamic countries of Iran, Central Asia, the Indian sub-continent and Indonesia, the Ottoman Empire and all other Islamic countries".

== Reception ==
EI is considered to be the standard reference work in the field of Islamic studies. Each article was written by a recognized specialist on the relevant topic.

The most important, authoritative reference work in English on Islam and Islamic subjects. Includes long, signed articles, with bibliographies. Special emphasis is given in this (EI2) edition to economic and social topics, but it remains the standard encyclopedic reference on the Islamic religion in English.

— Librarian Suzanne K. Lorimer, Yale University Library

The most important and comprehensive reference tool for Islamic studies is the Encyclopaedia of Islam, an immense effort to deal with every aspect of Islamic civilization, conceived in the widest sense, from its origins down to the present day... EI is no anonymous digest of received wisdom. Most of the articles are signed, and while some are hardly more than dictionary entries, others are true research pieces – in many cases the best available treatment of their subject.

— Historian R. Stephen Humphreys

This reference work is of fundamental importance on topics dealing with the geography, ethnography and biography of Muslim peoples.

— Iranologist Elton L. Daniel

Historian Richard Eaton criticised the Encyclopaedia of Islam in the book India's Islamic Traditions, 711–1750, published in 2003. He writes that in attempting to describe and define Islam, the project subscribes to the Orientalist, monolithic notion that Islam is a "bounded, self-contained entity".

== Editions ==
The first edition (EI1) was modeled on the Pauly-Wissowa Realencyclopädie der classischen Altertumswissenschaft. EI1 was created under the aegis of the International Union of Academies, and coordinated by Leiden University. It was published by Brill in four volumes plus supplement from 1913 to 1938 in English, German, and French editions.

An abridged version was published in 1953 as the Shorter Encyclopaedia of Islam (SEI), covering mainly law and religion. Excerpts of the SEI have been translated and published in Turkish, Arabic, and Urdu.

The second edition of Encyclopaedia of Islam (EI2) was begun in 1954 and completed in 2005 (several indexes to be published until 2007); it is published by the Dutch academic publisher Brill and is available in English and French. Since 1999, (EI2) has been available in electronic form, in both CD-ROM and web-accessible versions. Besides a great expansion in content, the second edition of EI differs from the first mainly in incorporating the work of scholars of Muslim and Middle Eastern background among its many hundreds of contributors:

EI1 and SEI were produced almost entirely by European scholars, and they represent a specifically European interpretation of Islamic civilization. The point is not that this interpretation is "wrong", but that the questions addressed in these volumes often differ sharply from those which Muslims have traditionally asked about themselves. EI2 is a somewhat different matter. It began in much the same way as its predecessor, but a growing proportion of the articles now come from scholars of Muslim background. The persons do not represent the traditional learning of Qom and al-Azhar, to be sure; they have been trained in Western-style universities, and they share the methodology if not always the cultural values and attitudes of their Western colleagues. Even so, the change in tone is perceptible and significant.

— R. Stephen Humphreys

Publication of the Third Edition of EI (EI3) started in 2007. It is available online, printed "Parts" appearing four times per year. The editorial team consists of twenty 'Sectional Editors' and five 'Executive Editors' (i.e. editors-in-chief). The Executive Editors are Kate Fleet, Gudrun Krämer (Free University, Berlin), Everett Rowson (New York University), John Nawas (Catholic University of Leuven), and Denis Matringe (EHESS, CNRS). The scope of EI3 includes comprehensive coverage of Islam in the twentieth century; expansion of geographical focus to include all areas where Islam has been or is a prominent or dominant aspect of society; attention to Muslim minorities all over the world; and full attention to social science as well as humanistic perspectives.

=== 1st edition, EI1 ===
- M. Th. Houtsma; et al. (eds.). The Encyclopædia of Islam: A Dictionary of the Geography, Ethnography and Biography of the Muhammadan Peoples. Leiden: E.J. Brill. 1913–38. 4 vols. and Suppl.
  - Vol.1. A–D, M. Th. Houtsma, T. W. Arnold, R. Basset eds., 1913.
    - Reprint A-Ba, Ba-Bu
  - Vol.2. E–K, M. Th. Houtsma, A. J. Wensinck, T. W. Arnold eds., 1927.
    - Reprint Itk-Kan
  - Vol.3. L–R, M. Th. Houtsma, A. J. Wensinck, E. Levi-Provençal eds., 1934.
    - Reprint L-M, Morocco-Ruyan
  - Vol.4. S–Z, M. Th. Houtsma, A. J. Wensinck, H. A. R. Gibb, eds., 1936.
    - Reprint S, T-Z, Supplement
    - Suppl. No.1. Ab-Djughrafiya, 1934.
    - Suppl. No.2. Djughrafiya-Kassala, 1936.
    - Suppl. No.3. Kassala-Musha'sha', 1937.
    - Suppl. No.4. Musha'sha'-Taghlib, 1937.
    - Suppl. No.5. Taghlib-Ziryab, 1938.
- M. Th. Houtsma, R. Basset et T. W. Arnold, eds., Encyclopédie de l'Islam: Dictionnaire géographique, ethnographique et biographique des peuples musulmans. Publié avec le concours des principaux orientalistes, 4 vols. avec Suppl., Leyde: Brill et Paris: Picard, 1913–1938. (French)
- M. Th. Houtsma, R. Basset und T. W. Arnold, herausgegeben von, Enzyklopaedie des Islām : Geographisches, ethnographisches und biographisches Wörterbuch der muhammedanischen Völker, 5 vols., Leiden: Brill und Leipzig : O. Harrassowitz, 1913–1938. (German) – vol. 1, vol. 3, vol. 4
- M. Th. Houtsma et al., eds., E.J. Brill's first encyclopaedia of Islam, 1913–1936, Leiden: E. J. Brill, 8 vols. with Supplement (vol. 9), 1993. ISBN 90-04-09796-1

=== SEI ===
- H. A. R. Gibb and J. H. Kramers eds. on behalf of the Royal Netherlands Academy, Shorter Encyclopäedia of Islam, Leiden: Brill, 1953. ISBN 90-04-00681-8
- M. Th. Houtsma et al. eds., İslâm Ansiklopedisi : İslâm âlemi coğrafya, etnografya ve biyografya lûgati, 13 in 15 vols., İstanbul: Maarif Matbaası, 1940–1988. (Turkish)
- أحمد الشنتناوي، إبراهيم زكي خورشيد، عبد الحميد يونس، دائرة المعارف الإسلامية: اصدر بالألمانية والإنجليزية والفرنسية واعتمد في الترجمة العربية على الأصلين الإنجليزي والفرنسي، الطبعة ٢، القاهرة: دار الشعب، -١٩٦٩ (Arabic)
- محمود ‌الحسن عارف، مختصر اردو دائرۀ معارف اسلامیه، لاهور: دانشگاه پنجاب، ۲۵ ج.ها، ۱۹۵۹-۱۹۹۳ (Urdu)

=== 2nd edition, EI2 ===
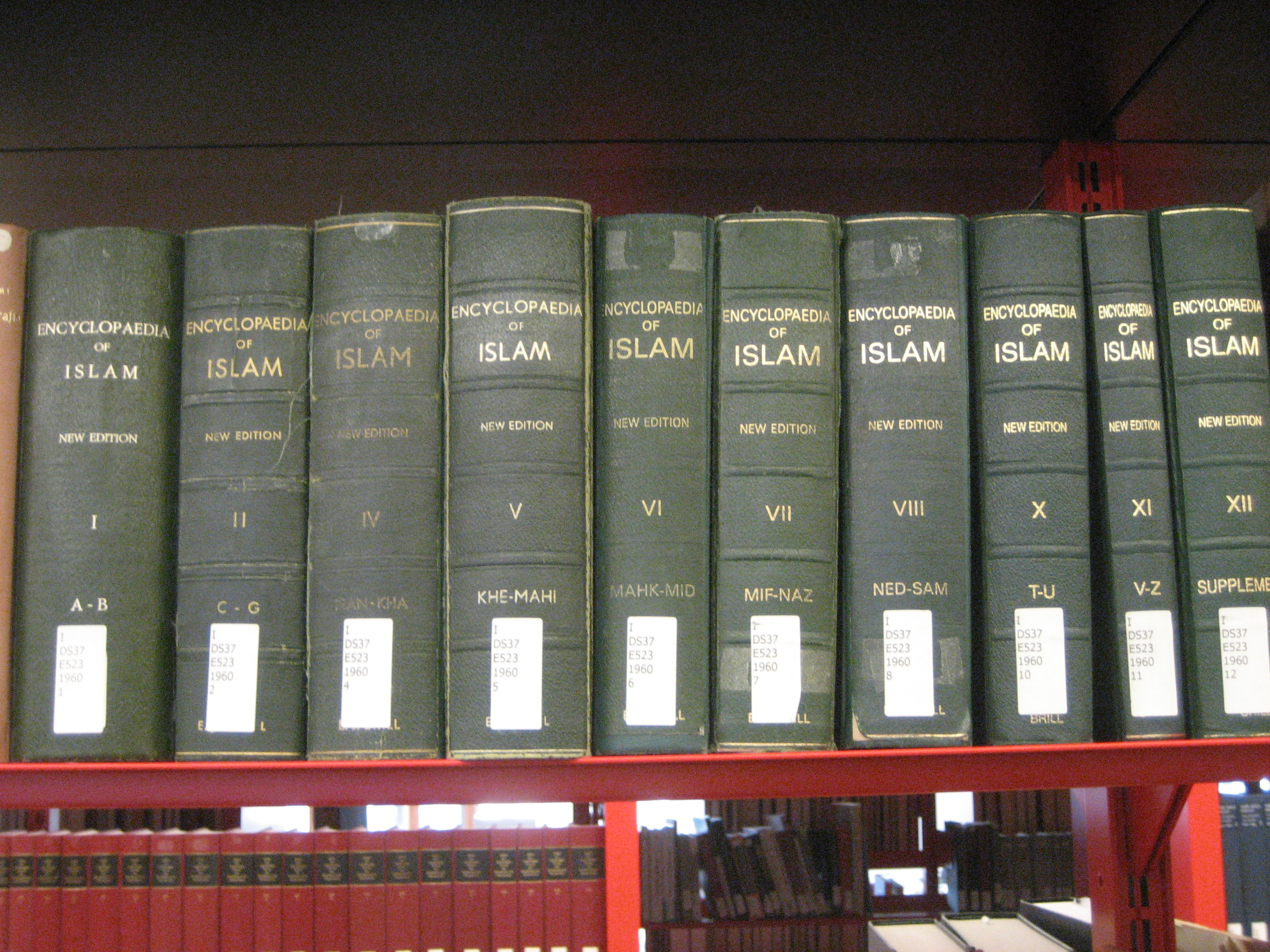
Encyclopaedia of Islam (2nd ed.)

- Edited by P. J. Bearman, Th. Bianquis, C. E. Bosworth, E. van Donzel, W. P. Heinrichs et al., Encyclopædia of Islam, 2nd Edition., 12 vols. with indexes, etc., Leiden: E. J. Brill, 1960–2005
  - Vol. 1, A – l–B, Edited by an Editorial Committee Consisting of H. A. R. Gibb, J. H. Kramers, E. Lévi-Provençal, J. Schacht, Assisted by S. M. Stern (pp. 1–320); – B. Lewis, Ch. Pellat and J. Schacht, Assisted by C. Dumont and R. M. Savory (pp. 321–1359). 1960. ISBN 90-04-08114-3
  - Vol. 2, C–G, Edited by B. Lewis, Ch. Pellat and J. Schacht. Assisted by J. Burton-Page, C. Dumont and V.L. Ménage., 1965. ISBN 90-04-07026-5
  - Vol. 3, H–Iram Edited by B. Lewis, V.L. Ménage, Ch. Pellat and J. Schacht, Assisted by C. Dumont, E. van Donzel and G.R. Hawting eds., 1971. ISBN 90-04-08118-6
  - Vol. 4, Iran–Kha, Edited by E. van Donzel, B. Lewis and Ch. Pellat, Assisted by C. Dumont, G.R. Hawting and M. Paterson (pp. 1–256); – C. E. Bosworth, E. van Donzel, B. Lewis and Ch. Pellat, Assisted by C. Dumont and M. Paterson (pp. 257–768); – Assisted by F. Th. Dijkema, M., 1978. ISBN 90-04-05745-5
  - Vol. 5, Khe–Mahi, Edited by C. E. Bosworth, E. van Donzel, B. Lewis and Ch. Pellat, Assisted by F.Th. Dijkema and S. Nurit., 1986. ISBN 90-04-07819-3
    - via Google Books
  - Vol. 6, Mahk–Mid, Edited by C. E. Bosworth, E. van Donzel and Ch. Pellat, Assisted by F.Th. Dijkema and S. Nurit. With B. Lewis (pp. 1–512) and W.P. Heinrichs (pp. 513–1044)., 1991. ISBN 90-04-08112-7
  - Vol. 7, Mif–Naz, Edited by C. E. Bosworth, E. van Donzel, W.P. Heinrichs and Ch. Pellat, Assisted by F.Th. Dijkema (pp. 1–384), P. J. Bearman (pp. 385–1058) and Mme S. Nurit, 1993. ISBN 90-04-09419-9
  - Vol. 8, Ned–Sam, Edited by C. E. Bosworth, E. van Donzel, W. P. Heinrichs and G. Lecomte, Assisted by P.J. Bearman and Mme S. Nurit., 1995. ISBN 90-04-09834-8
  - Vol. 9, San–Sze, Edited by C. E. Bosworth, E. van Donzel, W. P. Heinrichs and the late G. Lecomte, 1997. ISBN 90-04-10422-4
  - Vol. 10, Tā'–U[..], Edited by P. J. Bearman, Th. Bianquis, C. E. Bosworth, E. van Donzel and W. P. Heinrichs, 2000. ISBN 90-04-11211-1
  - Vol. 11, V–Z, Edited by P. J. Bearman, Th. Bianquis, C. E. Bosworth, E. van Donzel and W. P. Heinrichs, 2002. ISBN 90-04-12756-9
  - Vol. 12, Supplement, Edited by P. J. Bearman, Th. Bianquis, C.E. Bosworth, E. van Donzel and W. P. Heinrichs, 2004. ISBN 90-04-13974-5
  - Glossary and index of terms to v. 1–9, 1999. ISBN 90-04-11635-4
  - Index of proper names v. 1–10, 2002. ISBN 90-04-12107-2
  - Index of subjects, fasc. 1, compiled by P. J. Bearman, 2005. ISBN 90-04-14361-0
  - Glossary and index of terms to v. 1–12, 2006. ISBN 90-04-15610-0
  - An Historical Atlas of Islam, ed., William C. Brice, 1981. ISBN 90-04-06116-9
- E. van Donzel, Islamic desk reference: compiled from The Encyclopaedia of Islam, Leiden: E. J. Brill, 1994. ISBN 90-04-09738-4 (an abridged selection)

=== 3rd edition, EI3 ===
- Edited by Kate Fleet, Gudrun Krämer, Denis Matringe, John Nawas, and Everett K. Rowson, Encyclopædia of Islam, 3rd Edition., available online, printed "Parts" appearing four times per year, Leiden: E. J. Brill, 2007–. ISSN 1873-9830

== Translation ==
=== Urdu ===
It was translated into Urdu in 23 volumes named Urdu Daira Maarif Islamiya, published by University of the Punjab.

== See also ==
- Catholic Encyclopedia, English-language encyclopedia from a Catholic perspective (1907-1912)
- Encyclopædia Iranica, English-language encyclopedia of Iranian studies (1985-)
- Encyclopaedia Islamica, Persian-language encyclopedia of Islam and Iranian studies (1983-)
- Encyclopaedia of the Qurʾān, English-language encyclopedia of Quranic studies (2001-2006)
- İslâm Ansiklopedisi, Turkish-language encyclopedia of Islamic studies closely related to the Encyclopaedia of Islam (1939-)
- Jewish Encyclopedia, English-language encyclopedia of Jewish studies (1901-1906)
- Realencyclopädie der classischen Altertumswissenschaft, also known as the Pauly–Wissowa, German-language encyclopedia of classical studies (1894–1980)
