= Aalamul Quran =

1959 book by Abdul Majid Daryabadi

- 1998 version
- Author: Abdul Majid Daryabadi
- Original title: اعلام القرآن
- Language: Urdu
- Subject: Quranic studies
- Genre: Geography
- Publisher: Sidq-i-Jadid Book Agency
- Publication date: 1959
- Publication place: India
- Media type: Hardcover
- Pages: 208
- OCLC: 156905255
- Dewey Decimal: 297.1227

Aalamul Quran (Urdu: اعلام القرآن) is a book written by Indian scholar Abdul Majid Daryabadi on Science of Geography in the Quran. Published in 1959 by Sidq-i-Jadid Book Agency, Lucknow, comprising 208 pages, the book is an alphabetically arranged comprehensive dictionary of Quranic Personalities, whether human, angelic or diabolic mentioned in the Quran explicitly or implicitly. Thus, it is a book on the human geography of the Quran: both individual and tribal geography is furnished. The book introduces to 158 personalities. It is a unique work on this genre. Along with Tafseer-e-Majidi written both in Urdu & English, Daryabadi has authored another book entitled Jugrafiyah Qurani which elaborates physical geography employed in the Quran.

== Methodology ==
As for his methodology, not only did he incorporate the number of time a particular personality is mentioned in specific chapter & Ruku, but also supplemented it with details ransacked from other divinely inspired books, for example, Bible & other scriptures. The exhaustive details are avoided here, because in another book entitled The Tales of the Holy Quran, he intended to write all these details.

== Content ==
=== Anthropological Geography of the Prophets ===
In individual geography, he furnishes details of whereabouts of all the 26 Prophets mentioned in the Quran. He not only presents the contrary views about their location but also prefers one view, for example, describing the opposite views of descent of Prophet Adam either in Celon (Sirāndīp) or in Iraq between two waters of Tigris & Euphrates, he prefers the later view, but this view is not supported by majority. Secondly, he identifies Sirāndīp with Celon (modern day Sri-Lanka), while the modern geographers opine that Sirāndīp is modern day Maldev Islands. The latters view seems correct when the story of Rājah Dāhir, his loot, storm and deviation of the ship bearing the Muslim converts is kept in mind. While alluding to the Prophets abode, he dilates on its present geography & even distance from other cities, for instance, Prophet Isḥāq dwelt at Bi’r Shībā, once a thriving city, near Kinʻān, which lies to south of Jerusalem, to the North of Wādī al-Sabā, & is 28 miles South West to Al-Khalīl. While describing Prophets & others, he alludes to their relation to different geographical important cities or geographical achievements & areas of their empires, for example, the Prophet Dā’ūd made Ḥebraum his capital & then, shifted it to Jerusalem; secondly, Tubba, mentioned in the Qur’ān, whose empire lies to the North of Saba Empire, held Ḥimyar & Hadhar Maut in sway. While his father, says ʻAbd al-Mājid on the authority of Ibn-i Ḥabīb, got a road constructed from Madina to Yemen.

=== Anthropological Geography of the People ===
In addition to Prophets, he introduced to good People, for example, Tubba, Zaid, Saul (Ṭālūt). Vicious People like Āzar, Jālūt (Margoliuth), Pharaoh, Qārūn, Devil, Sāmrī, and so forth are also made familiarized. Geography of groups like Aiders to Jesus (Naṣārā), the companions of Prophet Mūsā, Brothers of Prophet Yusūf, idols like Yāʻūq, Yāghūth, Uzzā, Lāt, Manāt, Wad, Suvāʻ, Nassar & Baʻl, etc. are geographically delineated. The geographically represented groups of people like "The People of Ditch", "The People of Aikah", "The People of Ḥijr", "The People of Well", "The People of Saturday", "The People of Elephant", "The People of Town", "The People of Madyan" & "The People of Cave & Raqīm", and so forth, are fully introduced. The people mentioned with attributes instead of names are also elaborately described, for example, "the person whom Allāh has blessed", "the person who was given knowledge", "the person who passed by a person", etc. are introduced to establish their historicity. Thus, geography helps establish the historicity of people & tribes.

=== Tribal Geography ===
In tribal geography, he furnishes details regarding Quraysh, Thamūd, ʻĀd, Israelites, Yagot (Yājūj), Magot (Mājūj), and so forth. Progeny of different Prophets is given ample space, for example, progeny of Prophet Dā’ūd (Āl-i Dā’ūd), progeny of Prophet Mūsā, of Prophet Lūṭ, of Aram, of Prophet Yaʻqūb, and so forth.

=== Anthropological Geography of Women ===
Women or Feminine geography is also emphasized in the book: wives of Prophets & others, for example, of Prophet Lūṭ, Prophet Nūḥ, Pharaoh, ʻImrān, ʻAzīz; mothers like the mother of Prophet Mūsā are geographically delineated to assert their historicity. Some others are expounded by appending possessive cases like his wife, his mother, her mother, and so forth. Hārūn’s sister & Prophet Lūṭ’s daughters are also elaborated.

=== Non-human Personalities ===
Non-human personalities like angels (Gibrā’īl, Mikā’īl, Hārūt, Mārūt), Devil or Satan (Iblīs); idols (Lāt, Manāt, etc) are also geographically depicted.

== Drawbacks ==
The writer did not hail the research conducted by Sulaiman Nadvi concerning "the People of Ḥijr". He still regards them as Thamūdī not Nibṭī as Nadvī held. He preferred to go with the majority. The modern researchers discern in Madā’n-i Ṣāleḥ & Al-Mābiyāt. The modern researchers opine that Madāi’n-i Ṣāleḥ is not the place where the Prophet Ṣāleḥ resided. A Turkish researcher committed this blunder and all others followed. The place is attributed to another person by the name Ṣāleḥ. The Prophet Ṣāleḥ resided not at Madāi’n-i Ṣāleḥ rather at Al-Mābiyāt, but the author committed error here.

== Reception ==
Mohd Mahboob, a researcher of Aligarh Muslim University wrote about the book,

Daryābādī's trilogy on the Qur'ānic studies enables readers to fathom better the plethora of historical, geographical, and civilizational allusions in the Qurān. These works also set a new trend of the Qur'ānic scholarship in Urdu, as in addition to Tafsīr, other works on the Qur'ānic studies started appearing in Urdu.

—

== See also ==
- List of Sunni books
