= Bibliography of Abdul Majid Daryabadi =

- Daryabadi pictured in 1977

This bibliography of Abdul Majid Daryabadi is a selected list of generally available scholarly resources related to Abdul Majid Daryabadi, an Islamic scholar, philosopher, writer, critic, researcher, journalist and exegete of the Quran in Indian subcontinent in 20th century. He wrote an autobiography in Urdu titled Aap Biti, published in 1978. In this work, he tried to cover all the information related to himself as well as the remarkable events of his life. This list will include his biographies, theses written on him and articles published about him in various journals, newspapers, encyclopedias, seminars, websites etc. in APA style.

== Encyclopedias ==
- Datta, Amaresh (1987). Encyclopaedia of Indian Literature: A-Devo. Sahitya Akademi. p. 3. ISBN 978-81-260-1803-1.

== Biographies ==
- Daryabadi, Abdul Majid (1978). Āp bītī (PDF) (in Urdu). Lakhnaʼū, India: Maktabah-yi Firdaus. OCLC 5473390.
- Dariyābādi, ʻAbdulqavī (1978). Maulānā ʻAbdulmājid Daryābādī : ḥayāt va k̲h̲idmāt (in Urdu). Daryābād, Z̤ilaʻ Bārah Banki: Maulānā ʻAbdulmājid Ikāḍamī. OCLC 12077097.
- Firāqī, Taḥsīn (1993). Abdul Mājid Daryābādī : aḥvāl va ās̲ār (in Urdu). Idārah-yi S̲aqāfat-i Islāmiyyah. OCLC 30593236.
- K̲h̲ān, ʻAtīqurraḥmān (1993). Maulānā ʻAbdul Mājid Daryābādī, ḥayāt va k̲h̲idmāt (in Urdu). Ḥaidarābād. OCLC 156903797.
- Nadvī, Sayyid Sulaimān (1986). Sayyid Sulaimān Nadvī ke k̲h̲ut̤ūt̤ ʻAbdulmājid Daryābādī ke nām (in Urdu). Karachi, Pakistan: Nafīs Ikaiḍaimī. OCLC 22908651.
- Pernau, Margrit (2019). Abdul Majid Daryabadi: The Translation of Psychology. Oxford University Press. doi:10.1093/oso/9780199497775.003.0008. ISBN 9780190990831.
- Qāsimī, At̤āʼur Raḥmān (2006). Maulānā ʻAbdulmājid Daryābādī : k̲h̲idmāt va ās̲ār (in Urdu). Delhi: Shāh Valīullāh Insṭīṭiyūṭ. ISBN 81-901848-3-0. OCLC 63692457.
- Qidvāʼī, Abdulʻalīm (2010). Maulānā ʻAbdulmājid Daryābādī, ek bā kamāl inshā pardāz (in Urdu). Lakhnaʼū, India: Majlis-i Taḥqīqāt va Nashriyāt-i Islām. OCLC 754389942.
- Qidva'i, Salim (1998). Abdul Majid Daryabadi (in Urdu). Shahitya Academy. ISBN 978-81-260-0459-1.
- Shāhjahānpūrī, Abū Salmān (1987). Abūlkalām va ʻAbdulmājid : adabī maʻrakah (in Urdu). Pakistan: Idara-e Tasnif wa Tahqiq. OCLC 21165636.
- Umari, Irshad Suhail (2014). Maulana Abdul Majid Dariyabadi Ki Sahafti Khidmat (in Urdu). New Delhi, India: Director Qaumi Council Bara-e- Farogh-e-Urdu Zaban.
- Wasey, Akhtarul; Kidwai, Abdur Raheem (2016). Journey of Faith: Maulana Abdul Majid Daryabadi (1892-1977). Shipra. ISBN 978-81-7541-798-4.
- Zāhidī, K̲h̲ān G̲h̲ufrān; Qidvāʼī, Ḥusain; Dariyābādī, Abdulqavī (1981). Z̲ikr-i Mājid (in Urdu). Daryābād, India: Maulānā ʻAbdulmājid Daryābādī Akāḍmī. OCLC 14355529.
- Ziad, Homayra (2019), "The Return of Gog: Politics and Pan-Islamism in the Hajj Travelogue of Abd al-Majid Daryabadi", in Gelvin, James L.; Green, Nile (eds.), Global Muslims in the Age of Steam and Print, University of California Press, pp. 227–248, doi:10.1525/9780520957220-014, ISBN 978-0-520-95722-0, S2CID 226786616

== Theses ==
- Ahsan, Muhammad Suhaib (2016). Al-Ustadh 'Abd al-Majid al-Daryabadi wa-manhajihuhu fi tafsirih : dirasah tahliliyah (MA thesis) (in Arabic). Kuala Lumpur :Kulliyah of Islamic Revealed Knowledge and Human Sciences, International Islamic University Malaysia. Archived from the original on 2022-11-07.
- Andini, Aprilia Dewi (2019). Metodologi kitab tafsir ul Quran: translation and commentary of the holy Quran karya Maulana Abdul Majid Daryabadi (undergraduate thesis) (in Indonesian). Sunan Ampel State Islamic University Surabaya. Archived from the original on 2022-11-07.
- Khanam, Fauzia (2012). Moulana Abdul Majid Daryabadi ki adabi khidmath (PhD) (in Urdu). India: Department of Urdu, Aligarh Muslim University. hdl:10603/63562.
- Mahboob, Mohd. (2020). Abdul Majid Daryabadis contribution to Quranic studies (PhD). India: Department of Islamic Studies, Aligarh Muslim University. hdl:10603/354021.
- Mushtaq, Aroosha (2020). A Critical Study of Abdul Majid Daryabadi's English Translation and Exegetical Notes on the Holy Quran (PhD thesis). Government College University, Lahore.
- Salahuddin, S k (2013). Moulana Abdul Maajid Daryabadi ki adabi jehat (PhD) (in Urdu). India: Department of Urdu, University of Calcutta. hdl:10603/164202.
- Siddiqui, Zubair Ahmad (2017). Maulana Abdul Majid Daryabadi ki Sahafati Khidmaat Ka Tahqiqi Wo Tanqidi Jaiza (PhD) (in Urdu). India: Department of Urdu, Aligarh Muslim University. hdl:10603/208408.

== Journals ==
- Bozorgzadeh, Mohammad; Goli, Mehrnaz (2020). "Abd-al-Majid Daryabadi and his interpretation". Journal of Subcontinent Researches (in Persian). 12 (38): 9–28. doi:10.22111/JSR.2020.5235 (inactive 11 July 2025).
- Faruqi, Tahsin (2014). "Orientalists Approach to Sirah Writing and Mawlana Abdul Majid Daryabadi". Fikr-o Nazar. 52 (2). ISSN 2518-9948.
- Firaqi, Tehsin (2012). "Abdul Majid Daryabadi and Orientalists Biographies of the Holy Prophet" (PDF). Oriental College Magazine. 87 (2). ISSN 2789-4657.
- Majid, Abdul; Rehman, Attiq ur (2020). "A Research Study Of Secularism In Context Of Majidi Thought". The Scholar Islamic Academic Research Journal. 6 (1): 41–55. ISSN 2617-4308.
- Mian, Ali Altaf (2022). "Abd al-Mājid Daryābādī and reforming institutional Sufism in Colonial India". Journal of Islamic Studies. 34: 42–75. doi:10.1093/jis/etac043. ISSN 0955-2340.
- Mushtaq, Aroosha; Sultan Shah, Muhammad (2017). "Daryabadī's Atheism and Revivalism of Islam". Islamic Studies Research Journal Abḥāth. 2 (7): 32–44. ISSN 2521-067X. Archived from the original on 2023-09-26.
- Mushtaq, Aroosha; Shah, Muḥammad Sultan (2020). "English-a Critical Study Of 'abdul Mājid Daryābādī's Exegetical Notes On The Holy Qur'ān". The Scholar Islamic Academic Research Journal. 6 (1): 96–114. ISSN 2617-4308.

== Seminars ==
- Murad, Abdal Hakim (2021). Abdal Hakim Murad: Paradigms of Leadership (Videotape). Cambridge Muslim College.

== Other ==
=== Books ===
- Zaidī, ʻAlī Javād (1990). Ham qabīlah. Silsilah-yi mat̤būʻāt;305. Lakhnaʾū: Uttar Pradesh Urdū Akādmī.

=== Journals ===
- "Maulānā 'Abdul Mājid Daryābādī number". Farogh-i Urdu (in Urdu). 18. Lakhnow, India: Idarah-yi Farogh-i Urdu. 1971. OCLC 223163280.
