= Ali ibn Abi Talha =

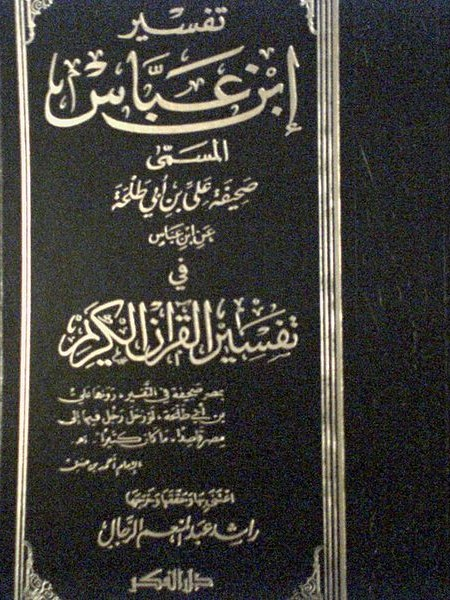
- Cover of the Tafsir Ibnu Abbas as published by Dar Al Fikr Al Lubnani

Personal life
- Born: Ali ibn Abi Talha Salim ibn al-Mukhayriq
- Died: 760 CE Homs, Syria
- Notable work: Tafsir Ibnu Abbas

Religious life
- Religion: Islam
- Denomination: Sunni

Muslim leader
- Influenced by: Ibn Abbas

Ali ibn Abi Talha (Arabic: علي بن أبي طلحة) was an early Islamic scholar and one of the Tabi'un. He was known for his narration of Hadith as well as his works on Tafsir that were done on authority of fellow Islamic scholar and Sahabi, Ibn Abbas. Ibn Abi Talha died in 760 CE during his stay in Syria.

== Life ==
Born as Ali ibn Abi Talha Salim ibn al-Mukhayriq, his father Abu Talha was formerly a slave of Abbas ibn Abdul Muttalib who was later freed. Aside from studying in the Arabian Peninsula, Ali ibn Abi Talha left home and travelled abroad, including places like Egypt and Syria where he studied Tafsir, including exegesis and interpretation of the Qur'an. His last travel was to Homs in Syria, where he eventually died.

== Reception ==
Ali ibn Abi Talha was generally well received by the scholars who came after him. According to Al-Azhar University professor Muhammad Husayn al-Dhahabi, Ibn Abi Talha was a reliable narrator in terms of his narrations of the views of Ibn Abbas. Dhahabi added that the later Hadith scholar, Bukhari, did not reject any narration from him and would classify his narrations as being acceptable. The founder of the Hanbali school of thought, Ahmad ibn Hanbal, praised him and also acknowledged his travels to Egypt in search of scholarly and religious knowledge. Jalal al-Din al-Suyuti regarded him as a trustworthy narrator from Ibn Abbas.

== Tafsir Ibn Abbas ==
The Tafsir Ibnu Abbas, first published in 1991 by the Muasasat Al Kutub Al Thaqafiya publishing house under direction of Rashid bin Abdul Moneim Al Rijal, contains all the exegetical narrations that are authentically attributed to Ali ibn Abi Talha. As all of these narrations were reported on authority of Ibn Abbas, this book is considered a reliable source regarding the views of Ibn Abbas on exegesis and interpretation of the Qur'an. In 2009, the Indonesian publishing house Pustaka Azzam would translate the book into the Indonesian language.

== See also ==
- Ibn Abbas
- List of Islamic scholars
