= Abdul Majid Daryabadi =

Indian Islamic scholar and philosopher (1892–1977)

D.Litt. Mawlānā Abdul Majid Daryabadi

Mawlānā

Personal details
- Born: 16 March 1892 Dariyabad, Barabanki British India
- Died: 6 January 1977 (aged 84) Barabanki, India
- Party: Khilafat Movement
- Parent: Abdul Qadir (father)
- Education: University of Lucknow; University of Allahabad; Aligarh Muslim University; St. Stephen's College, Delhi

Personal life
- Main interest(s): Comparative religion, Tafsir, Biography, Orientalism, Modernism, Islamic philosophy, Psychology, travelogue, Sufism, Journalism
- Notable works: Tafseer-e-Majidi (1941); Hakeemul Ummat (1956); Aalamul Quran (1959)

Religious life
- Religion: Islam
- Denomination: Sunni
- Jurisprudence: Hanafi
- Creed: Maturidi

Muslim leader
- Disciple of: Ashraf Ali Thanwi
- Influenced by: Shibli Nomani, Muhammad Iqbal, Mohammad Ali Jauhar, Ashraf Ali Thanwi, Hussain Ahmad Madani, Akbar Allahabadi
- Awards: Arabic Scholar Award by Government of India (1966); D.Litt. by Aligarh Muslim University (1976)

Abdul Majid Daryabadi (16 March 1892 – 6 January 1977) was an influential Islamic scholar, philosopher, writer, critic, researcher, journalist, and Quranic exegete active in the Indian subcontinent during the 20th century. He was deeply concerned with modernism, comparative religion, and orientalism in India.

In his early life, Daryabadi identified as a " Skeptic rationalist" and distanced himself from religion for nearly nine years. However, he later re-evaluated his beliefs and became a devout Muslim. He was closely associated with the Khilafat Movement and was actively involved with prestigious institutions such as the Royal Asiatic Society, Aligarh Muslim University, Nadwatul Ulama, and the Darul Musannefin Shibli Academy. He was a disciple of Ashraf Ali Thanwi and Hussain Ahmad Madani, both prominent Islamic scholars of the time.

Throughout his career, Daryabadi edited the Urdu weekly Sidq-e-Jaded, a publication widely respected across the Indian subcontinent for its inspiring message and distinctive style. Known for his expressive writing, often marked by humor and sarcasm, he continued to edit the journal until his death. Under the guidance of his mentor, Ashraf Ali Thanwi, Daryabadi authored the Tafseer-e-Majidi, a Quranic commentary first written in English and later translated into Urdu. This tafsir sought to purify Muslim thought by promoting an understanding of Islam based on original teachings, free from external influences, and encouraged a thoughtful review of past scholarly interpretations.

In recognition of his contributions, Daryabadi received the Arabic Scholar Award from the Government of India in 1967. In 1975, Aligarh Muslim University awarded him an honorary Doctorate in Literature. He died in January 1977.

== Life and family ==
Abdul Majid Daryabadi was born in Daryabad to Abdul Qadir (1848–1912) and Bibi Nasirun Nisa, both of Qidwai ancestry. His father, Abdul Qadir, was a follower of the Qadiriyya Sufi Order. Daryabadi's mother was also of Qidwai descent, and her father was the elder brother of Mufti Mazhar Karim Qudwai (Abdul Majid's paternal grandfather), making Daryabadi's parents cousins.

Daryabadi's maternal grandfather resided in Lucknow, which became a second home for him, as his father had also been born there. Abdul Majid was the youngest of five siblings. In his autobiography, Aap Biti, he noted that only one elder brother, Abdul Majid (d. 1951), and one elder sister, Zarifunnisa (later known as Bibi Sakina, d. 1945), were still alive during his later years.

== Education ==
Daryabadi grew up in a religious environment and initially studied Arabic and Persian under his father's guidance. In 1902, he began formal schooling at Sitapur High School, where he studied until 1908. In July 1908, Daryabadi was admitted to Canning College in Lucknow, which was then affiliated with Allahabad University. He pursued a B.A. (Honours) in Philosophy, with a curriculum that included English, metaphysics, ethics, and psychology. Daryabadi developed a keen interest in psychology, while his Arabic studies included classic works by Ibn Khaldun, Mutanabbi, and others.

In April 1912, he traveled to Allahabad to complete his B.A. exams, graduating with second-class honors in June. During this period, Daryabadi identified as a rationalist and agnostic, which marked a departure from his religious upbringing.

Following his B.A., Daryabadi hoped to pursue an M.A. in philosophy, available at only two institutions at the time: Banaras Hindu University and Aligarh Muslim University. He enrolled at Aligarh but failed his first-year examinations. Later, he transferred to St. Stephen's College in Delhi in 1913. However, his studies were cut short when his father died while performing Hajj in 1912. Financial constraints forced Daryabadi to leave his studies and enter the job market. During this time, he studied Buddhism and Theosophy but gradually returned to Islam under the influence of Ashraf Ali Thanwi and poet Akbar Allahabadi. He later became involved in the Khilafat Movement, serving as the president of the Oudh Khilafat Committee.

=== Receiving the title 'Maulana' ===
Although Daryabadi did not attend a traditional madrasah, he was well-versed in Arabic literature due to his education at Canning College. He graduated with strong knowledge in Arabic, English, psychology, philosophy, and logic. At around age 15 or 16, he published two articles, "Mahmud Ghaznavi" and "Ghadha-i Insani", in Wakil, a weekly magazine in Amritsar. Recognizing his scholarly potential, Wakil published the articles as a booklet and conferred upon him the title of "Maulana". However, Daryabadi did not accept this title at the time, as he was exploring rationalism and referred to himself as "Mr. Abdul Majid". Eventually, he returned to Islam, influenced by figures like Haji Warith Ali Shah, Akbar Ilah Abadi, Maulana Muhammad Ali Jawhar, and Rishi Bahgwan Das. Daryabadi's later contributions to Islamic literature, particularly his Tafsir, solidified his reputation as a scholar.

== Career ==
=== Writer and journalist ===
After ending his studies, Daryabadi pursued a career in journalism. He initially worked for publications such as Udh Panch in Lucknow, Al-Hilal in Kolkata, Jamindar in Lahore, and Hamdard in Delhi. In 1925, he founded his own weekly magazine, Sach, in Lucknow, where he served as editor until 1933. In 1933, he ceased publishing Sach to dedicate himself to writing an English translation and commentary on the Quran. He later relaunched Sach as Sidq, eventually renaming it Sidq-e-Jadid in 1950, a publication he continued to edit until his death in 1977.

Daryabadi's unique writing style and his editorial work in Sidq-e-Jadid gained him recognition as an eminent journalist and Islamic scholar. His prolific output includes over sixty published works, as well as contributions to prestigious Urdu journals such as Ma'arif of Azamgarh, Al-Nazir, Hamdam of Lucknow, and Hamdard of Delhi. He was also affiliated with institutions like the Royal Asiatic Society in London, the Hindustani Academy, and the Nadwatul Ulama of Lucknow. His commentaries on the Quran, written in both Urdu and English, are among his most celebrated contributions to Islamic scholarship.

=== Translator of Osmania University ===
Daryabadi's reputation as a scholar and writer earned him a position at Osmania University in Hyderabad. He served as a translator in the Department of Translation from September 1, 1917, to July 31, 1918, focusing on philosophy and logic. Although his tenure lasted only eleven months, his contributions were recognized by the government of Hyderabad, which supported the publication of his works. He received a lifetime pension from Hyderabad in appreciation of his services to Urdu literature. His early works, including pamphlets like Ghaza-i Insani and Mahmud Ghaznavi, reflected his early rationalist leanings and were published by the Anjuman-i Taraqqi-i Urdu.

=== Islamic philosopher and a Mufassir ===
Upon his return to Islam, Daryabadi developed close associations with devout Muslim intellectuals such as Akbar Allahabadi, Mohammad Ali Jauhar, Hussain Ahmad Madani, and Ashraf Ali Thanwi. Inspired by Thanwi, he embarked on an English and Urdu tafsir (Quranic commentary) project, comparing Islamic teachings to those in other religious texts like the Bible and the Jewish Encyclopedia. His Tafsir-ul-Quran in English and Al-Quran al-Hakim in Urdu are significant contributions to comparative religion and Islamic scholarship. He devoted much of his life to Islamic writing, publishing extensively on Islamic philosophy, Sufism, and Quranic interpretation.

=== Oath of allegiance ===
Daryabadi came from a family devoted to Islam, and after his return to the faith, he developed an interest in Sufism. In search of spiritual guidance, he initially considered taking an oath of allegiance with Mohammad Ali Jauhar, but ultimately took the oath from Ashraf Ali Thanwi in 1928. Later, he renewed his oath under Hussain Ahmed Madani with Thanwi's permission. His search for a spiritual guide is detailed in his book Murshid ki Talash ("In Search of a Spiritual Guide").

=== Awards ===
In 1966, Daryabadi received the Arabic Scholar Award from the Government of India. In 1976, he was awarded an honorary Doctorate in Literature from Aligarh Muslim University, which was presented to him by the Indian President Fakhruddin Ali Ahmed. Additionally, the Hyderabad State granted him a lifetime pension for his contributions to Urdu literature.

== Final days and passing ==
Daryabadi spent his last days at Khatun Manzil in Lucknow, where he was gravely ill. Despite his condition, many people from diverse backgrounds came to visit him. Among his frequent visitors were Abul Hasan Ali Hasani Nadwi and professors from Darul Uloom Nadwatul Ulama. His final visitor was Muhammad Tayyib Qasmi, the principal of Darul Uloom Deoband, who met with Daryabadi the day before his passing.

On January 6, 1977, at 4:30 a.m., Abdul Majid Daryabadi died at the age of 85. In accordance with his last wishes, his first Namaz-e-Janazah (funeral prayer) was led by Abul Hasan Ali Nadwi at Darul Uloom Nadwatul Ulama in Lucknow, attended by a large gathering. His body was then transported to his ancestral home in Daryabad, where a second Namaz-e-Janazah was held after the Maghrib prayer, led by Hafiz Gulam Nabi. He was laid to rest in his family's graveyard next to his forefather Makhdum Abkash.

== Personal life ==
Daryabadi had influential and notable family ties. His brother-in-law, Khan Bahadur Sheikh Masood-uz-Zaman, served as a member and the last deputy president of the Legislative Council in the United Provinces under British rule before the council was dissolved. Another sister married Nawab Nazir Yar Jung, a judge of the Hyderabad High Court. Their daughter, Hamida Habibullah, was married to General Enaith Habibullah, making her the mother of Wajahat Habibullah of the Saidanpur taluqa in Awadh.

Daryabadi's son-in-law, Hakeem Abdul Qavi Daryabadi, was a well-regarded Urdu journalist, while another son-in-law and nephew, Muhammad Hashim Kidwai, was a distinguished author, academic, and former MP, who also taught at Aligarh Muslim University (AMU). Among his grandchildren, several have made their mark in academia and journalism: Abdur Raheem Kidwai, an English professor and author at AMU; Shafey Kidwai, an award-winning critic and professor at AMU; Rasheed Kidwai, a well-known political analyst and journalist; and Nafay Kidwai, a prominent columnist and journalist who received the highest honor from the UP Urdu Academy.

On June 2, 1916, Daryabadi married Aftun Nisa, daughter of Shaykh Yusufuz-Zaman, a former magistrate. In 1930, he briefly entered a second marriage, which ended in divorce. Daryabadi remained with his first wife, Aftun Nisa, with whom he had daughters and sons, although his sons tragically died in early childhood.

== Views and thoughts ==
=== Rationalist period ===
Abdul Majid Daryabadi was born into a noble family. His father was a pious Muslim. As a child, he was raised and educated in a religious environment.

The 20th century was a time of freethinking and rationalism. During college he encountered the rationalist school of the West and became a rationalist and an agnostic. Gradually suspicion and disbelief started in his thought and faith. He read the books of atheists and orientalists, such as the Greek philosophers Plato, Aristotle, Socrates, and Dicard. He had especial zeal for the writings of Bacon, Hume, Locke, Mill, Baikal, Spenser, Huxley, Darwin, and William James; he read William James' The Book of Psychology and The Principles of Psychology.

This education upset his Islamic beliefs, and he converted to atheism. He was a rationalist and an agnostic, and though a Muslim by name, not a practising Muslim. In 1910, while filling out his intermediate final examination form, he wrote "Rationalist" instead of "Muslim" under the option of religion. In that time, he felt shame to introduce himself as a Muslim. During these college years, Daryabadi wrote books on philosophy, wherein he focused on rationalistic and Western philosophical thoughts.

This period lasted approximately ten years (1909–1918) of his young life. During this time, he still supported debating, writing, and discussing Islam. In his memoirs, Daryabadi wrote:

Perhaps in October 1911, a big conference was organized in Lucknow. Great speakers and missionaries gathered there. The famous debater Dr. Zuemer was there, a man proficient in Arabic as in English. I went there to meet Dr. Zuemer with his friend Abdul Bari Nadvi. Discussions started, father of Church asked on Islam insulting. Nadwi answered in Arabic, but I answered in English in favour of Islam.

Later in his life, after he returned to Islam, Daryabadi felt shame about his earlier rationalistic writings. About his suspicion, the famous Urdu poet Akbar Alahabadi said, "Changing of teaching will change the mind."

=== Return to Islam ===
In 1918, Daryabadi took to studying Buddhism and Theosophy, before rebecoming a Muslim under the influence of Ashraf Ali Thanwi (1863–1943). At the time, he was also influenced by renowned Indian writers and scholars, including Sibli Numani (1857–1914), the famous Urdu poet Akbar Allahabadi (1846–1921), Muhammad Ali Jawhar (1878–1931), Abdul Bari Nadawi (1886–1976), Sulayman Nadawi (1884–1953), Bagwan Das (Banaras), and Gandhi (1869–1948), as well as the mathnawi (poems) of Mawlana Jalaluddin Rumi.

He was inspired and influenced spiritually by Abdul Ahad Kasmundawi, Abid Husayn Fatehpuri, and Husayn Ahmad Madani (to take the oath of allegiance on him), Iqbal, Haji Muhammad Safi Bajnuri (d.1951 at Makka). In his memoirs he wrote about the famous poet Akbar Alahabadi, saying:

One day he told me that why I had Arabic in my college course? Have I any relation to! I replied him that now I have no time to read and write on it. He replied me that the literary status of the Quran is being recognized to the people of Europe, he heard that the last fifteen Para of the Quran are included in the course of literature in Garman University. He advised me that to leave it and try to understand it and I might have relation to the Quran and whatever I like the part of the Quran to read daily. This was his part of Tabligh.

On one occasion, Daryabadi praised philosopher John Stuart Mill in front of Akbar Alahabadi, saying "He is not at present physically alive, but he is present in the whole world. In all languages, Mill was the greatest person." Alahabadi replied, "Write down now what you think about Mill and date it today. In ten years time, I will ask you about your praise of Mill." Three years later, Daryabadi discarded his rational approach, and returned to the Islamic faith. After his return, he felt ashamed by his earlier rationalism and writings.

He wrote about his disbelieving life and his turning point back to Islam in his work Muasirin ('Contemporaries'), saying that "It was 1909 through reading English books written by agnostics, I had turned from a good believer to a heretic ... My apostasy has been continued till 1918 ... At that time, I read the English Quran Commentary by Muhammad Ali of Lahore. It convinced me that the Quran is no collection of hearsay stories, but a collection of deep and sublime truths, and if it was not heavenly, it was almost heavenly."

As a follower of Imam Abu Hanifah's teachings, Daryabadi's mazhab (school of thought) was Hanafism. This is one of the four schools of thought recognized by Ahl al-Sunnah wal Jamaah (Sunnism). Daryabadi interpreted his tafsir in the Hanafi school of thought.

=== Involvement in politics ===
Daryabadi was involved in the movement against English rule. Previously, his grandfather was jailed for nine years in 1857 for his involvement in the Indian Rebellion against the British East India Company rule.

When the demand of freedom of India was waving, his thinking was changed and inclined to the Congress. The writings of dailies and weeklies such as the Al-Hilal and Muslim Gusset favoured the movement for Indian independence. Curious, he joined the independence movement in Lucknow. His curiosity in politics ran from 1913 to 1916. In December 1916, the annual meeting of Congress was organized tumultuously in Lucknow, which he joined as a spectator.

He was related to Muhammad Ali Jauhar's journals Comrade (in English) and Hamdard (in Urdu), and read his writings with interest. He submitted some translations of English articles that critically discussed political methods. After English authorities arrested some anticolonial dissidents in 1917, Daryabadi became involved in politics out of feelings of national duty. In 1919, the Khilafat Movement arranged meetings and processions in many places.

Daryabadi was inclined to Gandhi and Muhammad Ali Jauhar. He got an opportunity to meet Gandhi in 1922, in the annual function of Khaja Ajmiri (1141–1236). In that time, Jauhar was in jail. After he was released in August or September 1923, Daryabadi met him at Bhuwali. When Jauhar was elected as president of Congress in December 1923, Daryabadi went to Aligarh and translated his speeches into Urdu. In 1931, after the death of Jauhar, he left politics and devoted himself to journalism and writing books on Islam. Later, Jauhar's younger brother, Shawkat Ali, sent a letter requesting Daryabadi to return to politics and organize a movement against the British Raj to establish the rights of Muslims.

=== View on finality of prophethood ===
During colonial rule, a person in Punjab claimed to be an apostolic prophet. Daryabadi emphasised the belief in the finality of prophethood (according to the Quran, Muhammad is the last prophet of God) and rejected any claim for the office of prophethood after Muhammad. Daryabadi drew from Quranic quotes, as well as the example of the historical figure Musaylmah, to explain why the Punjabi was a false prophet.

== Works and contribution ==
Daryabadi wrote more than fifty books and booklets on Islam, the philosophy of Islam, and psychology. His writings are authentic, attractive, rational, and deep. Initially employed as a journalist, he worked for Udh Panch (estd. 1877, Lucknow), Al-Hilal (estd. 1912, Kolkata), Jamindar (estd. 1912, Lahore), and Hamdard (estd. 1913, Delhi). He later worked as an editor of a weekly newspaper Sach (estd. 1925, Lucknow; later became Sidq and then Sidq-i-Jadid) until the end of his life.

He contributed literary articles to the prestigious Urdu journals Ma'arif of Azamgarh, Al-Nazir and Hamdam of Lucknow, and Hamdard of Delhi. In addition, he was the member of the Darul Musannefin Shibli Academy of Azamgarh, and later became the head of its Managing Committee. He was also associated with the Royal Asiatic Society London, Hindustani Academy, Court of the Muslim University Aligarh, Khilafat Committee, and the Nadwatul Ulama of Lucknow.

Most of his work was published in Lucknow, Lahore, and Karachi, with additional publications in Delhi, Kolkata, and Madras.

He was a prolific writer, Islamic scholar, and interpreter and commentor of the Quran in English and in Urdu. A versatile writer, his writings are divided into many subjects, which are categorised below:

=== Quranic sciences ===
- Tafsir-ul-Quran: Translation and Commentary of the Holy Quran (1941)

Daryabadi wrote this tafsir in English first by the influence of Sirajul Haq Machly Shahry, who was aware of Daryabadi's knowledge, personality, and good command of the English language. The author himself wrote the preface in December 1941. He observes that translation of the Quran is very difficult, and offers six main points of advice to translators. Because he observed some problems during his translation into English, he states that there is no language in the world as well as Arabic. The introduction was written by Abul Hasan Ali Hasani Nadwi on 16 August 1981. Top of the cover page of this tafsir has been written Tafsir-i Majidi by the publisher.

- Al-Quran Al-Hakim (1952)

This is a complete one-volume tafsir written in Urdu, first published in 1952 and totaling 1,215 pages. In the author's preface, he lists the books and exegeses he referenced during his writing. In particular, he lists the Bayan al-Quran of Ashraf Ali Thanawi as an important source. This tafsir has highly been recommended to Urdu-speaking Muslims in India and Pakistan.

- Tafsir-i-Quran: Tafsir-i Majidi (1998)

This is an incomplete three-volume tafsir written in Urdu, published in 1998 after his death. It is as same as his Urdu tafsir Al-Quran al-Hakim, but was not completed. However, title of the tafsir is different on cover page of this book.

- The Glorious Quran (1981–1985)

An abridged version of his Tafsir ul-Quran, published in four volumes between 1981 and 1985.

- Ard Al-Quran

A publication containing information about the places mentioned in the Quran.

- Shakhsiyat-I Quran

A publication containing information about the persons mentioned in the Quran.

- Alam al-Quran (1959)
- Al-Hywanat Fi Al-Quran or Hywanat-IQur'ani (1954)

This book contains information about the animals mentioned in the Quran, discussing their characteristics, activities, and the etymologies of their names. He wrote this book after finishing his English and Urdu tafsirs. He mentions in the preface (written 27 June 1954) that "After finishing my tafsir in English and in Urdu I realised that needed another contribution to the study of Quran."

- Bashriyat-i Anbiyah (1959/60)

He wrote this book after completion of his tafsirs in English and in Urdu. The first edition was published by Sidq Jadid book agency in 1959 or 1960. There are thirteen chapters, four of which are worded by Hakim Abdul Qawi daryabadi, editor of Sidq Jadid. The preface was written by the author himself. This book's focus is that Allah sent his apostle as a human not an Angel. He highlights that the apostles were not themselves God, but were instead selected from human society, as the best of us. An intention of this book was to purify the faith of people upon the oneness of Allah (tawhid).

- Qasas Wa-Masail
- Mashkilat Al-Quran

=== Islamic philosophy ===
- Sachchi Bati (True speech) (1982)

This book is a 312-page compilation of short editorial notes published in his weekly Sach. There are 130 notes compiled with different titles.

- Murshid-Ki Talash

This book's title means 'to look for a guide to almighty Allah'. In it, he advocates that in order for a Muslim to become near to Allah, he has to follow a good Islamic guide. He says that an Islamic spiritual guide must be qualified to develop and purify the inner world of the human being.

- Tamaddun-I Islam Ki Kahani
- Qatli Masyh-Sy-Ihud Ki Buriyat
- Zikr-I Rasul
- Mashwary Awr Gujarishi
- Tasawuf-I Islam (1929)

Daryabadi tries to establish that Islam and Tasawuf are correlated; that one is not separated from other. Each chapter of this book discusses an old or famous book on Tasawuf (Sufism), with an Urdu translation:

1. Chapter 1: Kitab al-Luma"if-alTasawuf by Shaykh Abu Nasar Siraj (b.378 AH), the oldest book on Tasawuf in Arabic
2. Chapter 2: Kashf al- Mahjub ('Revelation of the Veiled') by Shykh Abul Hassan Ali Ibn Uthman Hujwiri Ghaznawi (b. 470 AH / 990 AC), the oldest book on Tasawuf in the Persian language
3. Chapter 3: Risala-i Qushairiah by Imam Abul Qasimal-Qushari (376–465 AH)
4. Chapter 4: Fatuh al-Gayb by Shykh Mahiuddin Abdul Quadir Jilani Mahbub-i Subhani (471–561 AH)
5. Chapter 5: Awarif al-Maarif by Shykh Shahab Uddin Suhrawardi (531–632 AH)
6. Chapter 6: Fawaid al-Fuwad by Khajah Nizam Uddin Mahbub Ilahi (1238–1325 AC)
7. Chapter 7: Mantaq al-Tayr by Shykh Farid Uddin Attar (513–627 AH), a famous Persian Sufi who was a mystic poet and theoretician of Sufism
8. Chapter 8: Lawaih by Mawlana Jami (718 AH / 1414 AC – 898 AH / 1492 AC; actual name: Nuruddin Abdur Rahman Jami), who was a prolific scholar and writer of mystical Sufi literature.

=== Philosophy and psychology ===
Before he returned to Islam, Daryabadi wrote many books in philosophy, in which he focuses on rationalism and Western philosophy.

- Ghaja-I Insani (1910)

Daryabadi wrote this while an intermediate student at Canning College. In this book, he had discussed about the organs of human body. It references medical sciences, especially anatomical sciences. It was printed in Omitsar as a booklet in 1910. It was his second book in his early life.

- Falsafa-I Jadhbat (1913)

He wrote this book on philosophy while he was a student of BA and was influenced by books in English. It was published first in Urdu in 1914 AC. It was with 100 pages. Then it was published by Matba-i Institute, Aligarh in 1920AC. It was with 264 pages.

- Falsafa-I Ijtima
- Falsafa Ki TaLim Guzashtah Awr Mawjudah
- Mubadi-I Falsafah

A two-volume book on philosophy. Volume 1 (1931) contains six chapters; volume 2 (1934) contains seven.

- Ham Ap (popular psychology)

This was written by the advice of his college friend. It is a learning booklet and published as an article named Ik Khadim-i-Talim. Dr. Akhlaqur Rahman Qidwayi said that Daryabadi's philosophical thought is relevant even today.

- The Psychology of Leadership (1915)

Published in London in 1915 AC. It is his famous book on psychology. At that time, psychology was a branch of philosophy; later it became a separate science.

- J. S. Mill: A Bibliographical Sketch with the Critical Review of Some of His Writings

This book was written on John Stuart Mill, a great western philosopher. Daryabadi was influenced by Mill's thought.

=== Autobiography and biography ===
- Siratun Nababiyy Quran Ki Rushni Mye (1958)
- Ap Biti (1978)

It is a book of autobiography. The total pages of this book are 402.

- Chanda Sawanih Tahriri
- Hakimul Ummat

This is a biography of the life of Ashraf Ali Thanawi (1863–1943 AC), Daryabadi's spiritual guide, between the years 1927 and 1943. The total pages are 547.

- Muhammad Ali

The total pages of this book are 672. This is a biography of the life of Mawlana Muhammad Ali Jawhar (1878–1931 AC), Daryabadi's political guide and a great leader of Indian Muslims, between the years 1912 and 1930.

- Mahmud Ghaznawi

It was his first book in his early writing life.

- Muasirin

This is a biographical book of people contemporary with Daryabadi: forty-three persons elder, twenty-nine persons his age, and eight persons younger.

- Wafiyat-I Majidi (2002)

A compilation of 62 biographical articles selected from hundreds from his weekly Sidq and Sidq-e-Jadid. There are 288 pages in this book. The included persons are from different categories. The first chapter includes ten family members, like his mother, elder brother, elder sister, wife, and relatives. The second chapter contains twelve respected ulama (scholars) and persons of the Sufi order. The third chapter contains sixteen political leaders. The fourth chapter has fourteen personalities of famous poets, literati, and journalists. The fifth chapter has four personalities, who were doctorates and physicians. The sixth chapter has seven personalities, who were from different fields.

- Akbar Namah (2008)

A biography of the famous Indian Urdu poet Akbar Alahabadi. There are sixteen chapters included in this book, and 311 pages.

=== Travels ===
- Safar-I Hijaz

This book was written on his traveling to Hijaz for pilgrimage.

- Sayahat-I Majidi (2006)

This book presents eleven places in India where he traveled—Mumbai, Bihar, Bhopal, Hyderabad, Delhi, Kolkata, Madras, Aligarh, and Agra—as well as Pakistan and Lahore. There are 360 pages and 15 topics in this book.

- Mubarak Safar

Also titled Two weeks and a half in Pakistan.

== Legacy ==
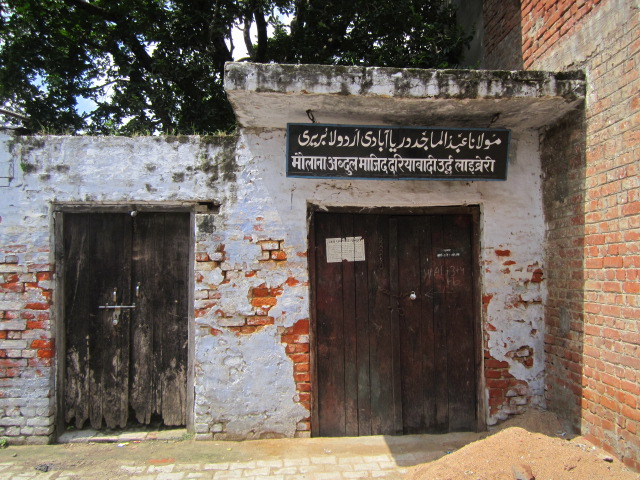
Maulana Abdul Majid Daryabadi Urdu Library, Begumganj, Barabanki

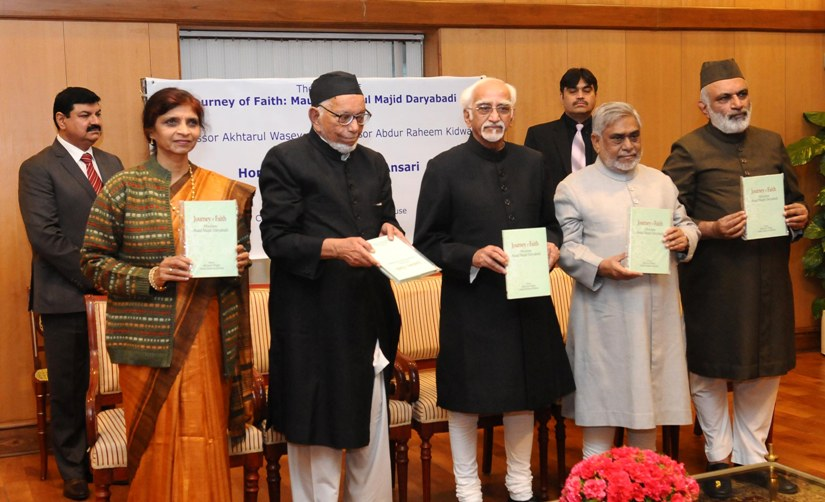
Mohammad Hamid Ansari, Vice President of India releasing the book titled Journey of Faith: Maulana Abdul Majid Daryabadi

Daryabadi wrote an autobiography in 1978 named Aap Biti. Abdul Qavi Desnavi published a special number on Daryabadi in the Lucknow edition of Naya Daur. He also published a review on Daryabadi in Maasreen published in Sahir Bombay Vol. 51 – No. 7 in 1980. In 2008 Md. Shams Alam, a research scholar from the Department of Arabic, Persian, and Urdu of University of Madras, published a research paper on Daryabadi entitled "Moulana Abdul Majid Daryabadi ki ilmi wa adabi khidmath" (The scholarly and literary service of Maulana Abdul Majeed Daryabadi).

On 15 January 2005, the Shah Waliullah Institute, Delhi, and National Council for the Promotion of Urdu Language (NCPUL) jointly organised a national seminar on the life and services of Daryabadi at Rajinder Bhawan, New Delhi. Akhlaqur Rahman Kidwai, governor of Haryana presided over the seminar. Participants presented 17 scholarly papers on different aspects of his life and services. On 20 March 2022, the AMU Old Boys Association and the Sidq Foundation jointly organised a seminar named "Urdu Journalism & Maulana Abdul Majid Daryabadi" at the Islamic Centre of India, Aishbagh, Lucknow.

== See also ==
- Bibliography of Abdul Majid Daryabadi
- List of Deobandis
