= Al-Raghib al-Isfahani =

11th-century Sunni Muslim scholar of later Abbasid era

Abul-Qasim al-Hussein bin Mufaddal bin Muhammad

Personal life
- Died: 502 AH (1108/1109 CE)
- Era: Later Abbasid era
- Main interest(s): Muslim scholar of Qur'anic exegesis, Arabic language scholar
- Notable work: Al-Mufradat fi Gharib al-Quran

Religious life
- Religion: Islam
- Denomination: Sunni
- Jurisprudence: Shafi'i
- Creed: Ash'ari

Muslim leader
- Influenced by: Sibawayh, Al-Khalil ibn Ahmad al-Farahidi

Abul-Qasim al-Hussein bin Mufaddal bin Muhammad, better known as Raghib Al-Isfahani (Persian: ابوالقاسم حسین ابن محمّد الراغب الاصفهانی), was an eleventh-century Muslim scholar of Qur'anic exegesis and the Arabic language.

== Biography ==
Al-Raghib Al-Isfahani - was born in Isfahan as his name suggests, though his exact date of birth is not known.

He died in the Hijri year 502, corresponding to 1108 on the Gregorian calendar.

== Views ==
Al-Raghib was suspected as Shia sympathizer, due to his statement for his love of Ahl al-Bayt. Meanwhile, some thought he was a Mu'tazilite.

However, one of his works entitled al-I'tiqadat, al-Raghib attacks both the Mu'tazila and the Shi'a showing that questions about his adherence to either of these positions is groundless.

al-Raghib was opposed to the emanationism of the Brethren of Purity, preferring creationism instead. The concept of justice, according to al-Raghib's definition, is "equal retaliation" for wrongdoing.

== Works ==
His work covered topics ranging from ethics to linguistics to Muslim philosophy. He authored a commentary on the Quran, Mufradāt alfāẓ al-Qurʾān. One of his most famous works was Al-Mufradat fi Gharib al-Quran.

As a man of letters, al-Raghib was also well-versed in Arabic literature. His literary anthology, which was carefully organized by topic, carried much weight and respect in intellectual circles. He was also noted as an early Muslim writer on the topic of blending religious and philosophical ethics.

== Bibliography ==
- THE ETHICAL PHILOSOPHY OF AL-RĀGHIB AL-ISFAHĀNĪ, Journal of Islamic Studies (1995) 6 (1): 51-75. Oxford Journals.
