= William Brice (ethnographer) =

British ethnographer and linguist

William Charles Brice (3 July 1921 – 24 July 2007) was a British ethnographer, linguist, and archeologist. He was a polyglot and could reportedly speak 6 languages, in addition to English: Turkish, Punjabi, Urdu, Arabic, French, and Hindi.

== Personal life ==
Brice was born in Richmond, Yorkshire to parents Ida and John Brice. His parents were painters and decorators. He had one younger sister, Joan, who married a local farming family. Brice excelled in school and in 1939, he won a scholarship to study geography at Jesus College, Oxford. In 1941, during his second year, he was called to duty to serve as an officer trainee in Dunbar during World War II. He later served in India, protecting railways near Madras and supplying maps to troops, for which he was awarded the Burma Star. In 1946, Brice returned to Oxford and completed his BA and MA in geography.

In 1951, Brice married Frances Hodges, a history lecturer. They had four children: three daughters and one son.

== Career ==
From 1946-47, Brice participated in an archaeological expedition to eastern Turkey. He helped to excavate the Neolithic site of Yumuktepe in Mersin and the Roman frontier site at Antioch.

Brice was appointed lecturer in geography at Manchester University in 1947, returning to Oxford in 1951 as assistant curator and lecturer in ethnology at the Pitt Rivers Museum. Sir John Myres gave him the task of working on Linear A, and his breakthroughs were recorded in Inscriptions in the Minoan Linear Script of Class A (1961). In 1967, he was appointed as the editor of the journal Kadmos, which focused on prealphabetic writing and the languages and cultures from which they came.

== Works ==
Brice's publications include An Historical Atlas of Islam (1981), The Mediterranean Sea Atlas (2003), translated from a 16th-century Arabic manuscript. and South-west Asia (A Systematic Regional Geography; vol. 8), University of London Press, 1966. He was also responsible for the 8th, 9th and 10th editions of Walter Fitzgerald's Africa (1955, 1961 & 1967).

In 1959, Brice wrote an article for the Expedition Magazine at the Penn Museum on British archeology.

== See also ==
- William C. Brice collection at UT Austin
