= Urdu Daira Maarif Islamiya =

Urdu encyclopedia of Islam (1954–1992)

- Urdu Cover
- Author: Muhammad Shafi
- Original title: اردو دائرہ معارف اسلامیہ
- Language: Urdu
- Subject: Islam
- Genre: Encyclopedia
- Publisher: University of the Punjab
- Publication date: 1992 (full)
- Publication place: Pakistan
- Media type: Print
- Website: pu.edu.pk

Urdu Daira Maarif Islamiya or Urdu Encyclopaedia of Islam (Urdu: اردو دائرہ معارف اسلامیہ) is the largest Islamic encyclopedia published in Urdu by University of the Punjab. Originally it is a translated, expanded and revised version of Encyclopedia of Islam. Its composition began in the 1950s at University of the Punjab. Its completion was delayed due to various reasons including political unrest, death of the main editor, financial crisis. In 1989, a total of 23 volumes were completed.

== History ==
The Urdu Encyclopaedia of Islam is the project of translating the Encyclopedia of Islam into Urdu. It was started in the 1950s at University of the Punjab, as a project led by Muhammad Shafi. The editorial board worked on translating the Leiden Encyclopaedia into Urdu, amending, correcting, and adding to the Leiden text themselves. The original plan for publication, as laid out by Shafi and others, was for the Encyclopaedia (which was to be entitled Urdu Da’ira Ma’arif-i-Islamiya) to span between 20 and 22 volumes, with roughly a hundred illustrations per volume, published at a rate of four volumes per year. At the time of Shafi's death in 1963, one volume of the encyclopaedia had been published (in February 1954), and a second volume was in press. Because of Shafi's death, and lack of funding, work on the Encyclopaedia stalled until 1971, when a grant from the Asia Foundation enabled it to resume. Volumes 10 and 12 were completed by 1973. By 1985, 21 out of a planned 25 volumes had been published.

== Editorial board ==
The first fifteen-members of Majlis-e Intizamiyy, lays down the publication policy and decides on the financial structure. Due to the political unrest, some members of the delegation changed frequently. The committee appointed five members from among them as the editorial board called Idare-i Tahrir (Standing Committee of the Editorial Board). A representative body called the Foreign Editorial Board was also formed to support encyclopedias among scholars outside the Pakistan. After thirteen years of Muhammad Shafi's presidency, Syed Muhammad Abdullah took over the presidency.
