= Tafsir Ibnu Abbas =

Tafsir that is attributed to Ibn al-Abbas

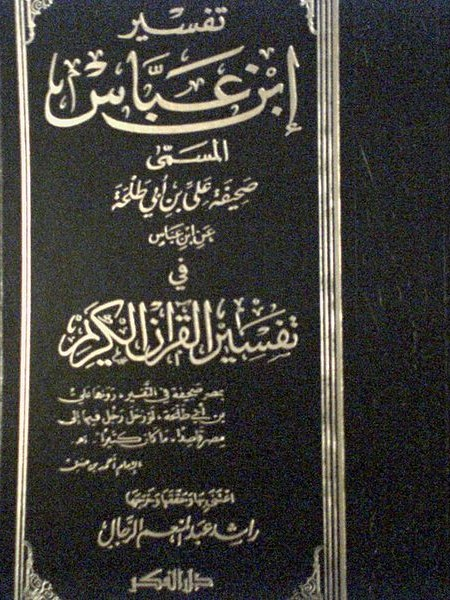
- Cover of the original Arabic version, published by Dar Al Fikr
- Author: Ali ibn Abi Talha
- Original title: Tafsir Ibn Abbas al-Musama Sahifat Ali ibn Abi Talha an-Ibn Abbas (Arabic: تفسير ابن عباسالمسمىصحيفة على بن أبي طلحةعن ابن عباس)
- Language: Arabic, Indonesian
- Genre: Tafsir (interpretation and exegesis of the Qur'an)
- Publisher: Muasasat Al Kutub Al Thaqafiya, Dar Al Fikr Al Lubnani, Pustaka Azzam
- Publication place: Lebanon, Indonesia

Tafsir Ibnu Abbas, also known as Tafsir Ibn Abbas al-Musama Sahifat Ali ibn Abi Talha an-Ibn Abbas (Arabic: تفسير ابن عباس المسمى صحيفة على بن أبي طلحة عن ابن عباس) is a book of Tafsir; containing the topics of exegesis and interpretation of the Qur'an. The book is narrated and written by Ali ibn Abi Talha. The book has been translated into Indonesian as well.

== Content ==
Tafsir Ibnu Abbas contains exegetical narrations from Ali ibn Abi Talha that were authenticated by Ibn Abbas, the 7th-century Islamic scholar and Sahabi (companion of Muhammad). Muhammad Husayn al-Dhahabi from the Al Azhar University of Cairo, Egypt regarded Ibn Abi Talha as a reliable source of narrations regarding the views of Ibn Abbas:

In brief, this is the most authentic chain of narration with regards to Ibn Abbas' Tafsir. It should be enough that Bukhari considered his narrations as authentic, and did not reject it.

== Publication history ==
A compilation of Ali ibn Abi Talha's narrations, in Arabic, were first published in one book by the publisher Muasasat Al Kutub Al Thaqafiya; directed by Rashid bin Abdul Moneim Al Rijal. This compilation was later translated into Indonesian by Pustaka Azzam publication centre of South Jakarta, Indonesia. The Arabic version was also published by Dar Al Fikr Al Lubnani.

== See also ==
- Tanwir al-Miqbas, another Tafsir book attributed to Ibn Abbas
