= Al-Mufradat fi Gharib al-Quran =

Dictionary of Qur'anic terms by Al-Raghib al-Isfahani

- Cover of Al-Mufradat fi Gharib al-Quran
- Author: Al-Raghib al-Isfahani
- Original title: المفردات في غريب القرآن
- Language: Arabic
- Subject: Qur'anic lexicography
- Genre: Dictionary
- Publication date: 11th century
- Publication place: Abbasid Caliphate

Al-Mufradat fi Gharib al-Quran (Arabic: المفردات في غريب القرآن) is a classical dictionary of Qur'anic terms by 11th-century Sunni Islamic scholar Al-Raghib al-Isfahani. It is widely considered by Muslims to hold the first place among works of Arabic lexicography in regard to the Qur'an.

== Content ==
It is considered a comprehensive book with an extensive list of rare terms found in the Quran, together with their Arabic definitions and usage, this dictionary is among the first to be produced regarding the difficult terms found in the Qur'an. It is arranged alphabetically.

== See also ==
- List of Sunni books
