= Tanwir al-Miqbas =

Tafsir falsely attributed to Ibn al-Abbas, said to be collected by Firuzabadi

Tanwir al-Miqbas min Tafsir Ibn Abbas
- Author: Firuzabadi (compiler)
- Original title: تنوير المقباس من تفسير ابن عباس
- Language: Arabic
- Genre: Tafsir (interpretation and exegesis of the Qur'an)

Tanwir al-Miqbas, fully known as Tanwir al-Miqbas min Tafsir Ibn Abbas (Arabic: تنوير المقباس من تفسير ابن عباس, romanized: Tanwīr al-Miqbās min Tafsīr Ibn ʿAbbās) is a book of Tafsir; comprising exegesis and interpretation of the Qur'an. The book contains narrations of disputed authenticity which are attributed to the 7th-century Islamic scholar and Sahabi, Ibn Abbas. It was first compiled by the Persian Islamic scholar, Firuzabadi.

== History and content ==
Tanwir al-Miqbas is a compilation of narrations regarding exegesis and interpretation of the Qur'an that are attributed to Ibn Abbas, of varying authenticity. These narrations were first copied down and then collected by the scholar Firuzabadi who subsequently published a complete compilation of these narrations all into one book. The content in this book is considered atypical for a Tafsir work, especially one attributed to a Sahabi.

== Authenticity ==
A good number of Islamic scholars have clarified that the narrations in the book cannot be authentically attributed to Ibn Abbas. Dr. Mokrane Guezzou, who first translated the Tanwir al-Miqbas book into English, says the following in the introduction of the work:

There is no doubt that this commentary is not the work of Ibn Abbas. The chain of transmitters of this commentary goes back to Muḥammad ibn Marwan, to al-Kalbi, to Abu Salih, which is described by Hadith experts as the chain of lies (Silsilat al-Kadhib), for this line of transmission is utterly dubious and unreliable.

Taqi Usmani, in his work Uloomu-l-Qur'an, agrees that Tanwir al-Miqbas cannot be attributed to Ibn Abbas and also comments on the unreliability of the chain of transmission of the narrations in the book:

It is wrong to ascribe it to Ibn Abbas because this book has been based on the reported sequence of Muhammad ibn Marwan as-Suddi from Ibn al-Kalbi from Abi Salih from Ibn Abbas (R) ... this has been regarded by the Muḥaddithīn as a "chain of falsehood."

Bilal Philips in Usool at-Tafseer states that Tanwir al-Miqbas cannot be relied upon, due to it having Ibn al-Kalbi in the chain of transmission.

Nearly all of the so-called "Tafsir" of Ibn Abbas is based on statements narrated in chains containing Muhammad ibn as-Sa'ib al-Kalbi. Hence, this tafseer is considered unreliable for the most part; and, despite its popularity among the masses, it is totally rejected by Muslim scholars.

Phillips then added that, Ibn al-Kalbi was accused of making up Hadith (narrations from Muhammad or his companions, the Sahaba) hence Tanwir al-Miqbas cannot be an authentic work from Ibn Abbas himself.

Abdul-Rahim Reasat, on authority of Faraz Rabbani, stated that Tanwir al-Miqbas could not be relied upon, due to problematic narrators in the chain of transmission:

The tafsir in question uses the narrations of al-Suddi al-Saghir from al-Kalbi – which are the weakest and most problematic narrations of tafsir ascribed to him.

== See also ==
- Tafsir Ibnu Abbas which is another book of Tafsir that is attributed to Ibn Abbas
- Tafsir Ibn Kathir
- Tafsir al-Tabari
