= Ahkam al-Qur'an =

Aḥkām al-Qurʾān is the title of several works on the juridical exegesis of the Quran, such as:

- Ahkam al-Qur'an (al-Jassas) by Al-Jassas
- Ahkam al-Qur'an (al-Harrasi) by Al-Kiya al-Harrasi
- Ahkam al-Qur'an (Ibn al-Arabi) by Abu Bakr ibn al-Arabi
- Al-Jami' li Ahkam al-Qur'an (al-Qurtubi) by Al-Qurtubi
- Ahkam al-Qur'an (Jalal) by Jalal al-Din Qadri
