= Tafsir al-Qurtubi =

Exegesis of the Quran by al-Qurtubi

- Editor: Abd Allah al-Turki
- Author: Al-Qurtubi
- Original title: تفسير القرطبي
- Language: Arabic
- Genre: Tafsir
- Publisher: Al-Risalah al-Alamiyyah
- Publication date: 2006
- Publication place: Beirut, Lebanon
- Pages: 24 volumes
- ISBN: 9789933424510

Al-Jāmiʿ li-Aḥkām al-Qurʾān (Arabic: الجامع لأحكام القرآن, lit. 'The General Judgments of the Qur'an'), commonly known as Tafsīr al-Qurṭubī (Arabic: تفسير القرطبي), is a classical Sunni Quranic commentary authored by al-Qurtubi, a Maliki jurist and Ash'arite theologian. The work focuses primarily on the legal rulings (aḥkām) derived from the Qur'an while also encompassing linguistic analysis, historical context, theological discussions, and spiritual insights. It is considered one of the most comprehensive and renowned Qur'anic commentaries in Islamic scholarship.

== Name ==
Al-Qurtubi himself titled his commentary al-Jāmiʿ li-Aḥkām al-Qurʾān, as he states in the introduction (muqaddimah) of his work: “and I named him al-Jāmi' li aḥkām al-Qurānwa al-Mubayyīn limātaḍammanahu min al-Sunnah wa āi al-Furqān. May Allah make it (a practice that is) sincere} only hoping for its pleasure and hopefully it can benefit me, my parents, and those who wish their kindness. He hears a prayer, He is near and He grants requests. Āmīn”.

== Background ==
Al-Qurṭubī stated that his purpose in writing this tafsīr was to succinctly express the linguistic, grammatical (syntax), and recitational (qirāʾāt) subtleties he had gathered throughout his life on Qur’anic interpretation; to respond to those who had deviated or gone astray; to bring into the field of tafsīr numerous ḥadīths concerning the occasions of revelation (asbāb al-nuzūl) and legal rulings (aḥkām); and to explain both these narrations and the opinions transmitted from the early generations (salaf).

== Methodology ==
Although the title al-Jāmiʿ li-Aḥkām al-Qurʾān might suggest that it belongs to the Aḥkām al-Qurʾān genre (works focusing solely on legal injunctions in the Qur'an), it is in fact, as the name indicates, a comprehensive (jāmiʿ) Qur'anic commentary that deals with verses from multiple perspectives, aiming to interpret the entire Qur'an. Al-Qurṭubī explores the Arabic language through its linguistic and stylistic features (lexical analysis). In addition to explaining the verses, he conducts research into difficult words and discusses diacritical marks, as well as the elegance of style and composition.

He also examines the occasions of revelation (asbāb al-nuzūl), variant readings, and issues of abrogation (nāsikh wa-mansūkh), along with theological and legal matters. Al-Qurṭubī employed a method of transmitting related reports and opinions, carefully weighing them, and offering his own evaluations. In doing so, he successfully continued in al-Jāmiʿ li-Aḥkām al-Qurʾān the encyclopedic style of tafsīr-writing that began with Muḥammad ibn Jarīr al-Ṭabarī (d. 310/923) and was carried on by Ibn ʿAṭiyya al-Andalusī (d. 541/1147). The work combines both transmitted (riwāyah) and rational (dirāyah) commentary and is highly systematic in its structure. The subjects contained within the verses—sometimes numbering twenty or thirty—are arranged under independent headings, with each topic thoroughly discussed in its respective section.

In his tafsīr, al-Qurṭubī gives broad attention especially to variant readings (qirāʾāt), occasions of revelation (asbāb al-nuzūl), linguistic explanations, and jurisprudential discussions. After citing ḥadīths transmitted from the Prophet whether directly interpreting a verse or related to its broader themes, he sometimes analyzes these narrations in terms of their sources, chains of transmission (isnād), content, and relevance to the topic. Likewise, he transmits the views of the Companions, and the Followers (Tabi'un) and occasionally compares these opinions, preferring one view over another on the basis of evidence. His lexical analyses make frequent reference to Arabic poetry, more so than al-Ṭabarī or Ibn ʿAṭiyya, and he occasionally delves into theological issues, offering critiques of the beliefs of sects such as the Shīʿa, Muʿtazila, and Khārijites.

A follower of the Mālikī school of jurisprudence, al-Qurṭubī does not strictly confine himself to it; in some matters, he prefers the opinions of other legal schools. His tafsīr is an important source for explaining the legal rulings (aḥkām) of the Qur'an and deriving juristic conclusions from them. While respectful toward the science of Tasawwuf and their practitioners (sufis), he also makes clear but courteous and balanced criticisms of certain Sufi practices.

== Literary Sources ==
Among the sources of al-Jāmiʿ li-Aḥkām al-Qurʾān, the foremost is Ibn ʿAṭiyya's al-Muḥarrar al-wajīz. Other major sources of exegesis include Jāmiʿ al-bayān ʿan taʾwīl āy al-Qurʾān by al-Ṭabarī, Baḥr al-ʿUlūm by Abū al-Layth al-Samarqandī, Al-Nukat wa'l-ʿUyūn fī Tafsīr al-Qurʾān by al-Māwardī, Al-Taysīr fī at-Tafsīr by Abū Naṣr al-Qushayrī, Tafsir al-Wasit by al-Wāḥidī, Aḥkām al-Qurʾān by al-Kiyā al-Ḥarrāsī, and Aḥkām al-Qurʾān by Abū Bakr ibn al-ʿArabī. Al-Qurṭubī also used many works on ḥadīth compilations, Arabic language, and ʿulūm al-Qurʾān (Qur'anic sciences), usually citing them with care.

== Editions ==
Al-Qurṭubi's commentary was first published in Cairo by Dār al-Kutub al-Miṣriyyah between 1933 and 1950 in 20 volumes. Later, in 2006, Al-Risalah al-Alamiyyah in Beirut released a revised edition in 24 complete volumes, edited and verified (taḥqīq) by Abd Allah al-Turki.

== Translations ==
This tafsir has been translated into many languages. It can be read in English, Urdu, Turkish, Arabic and Spanish languages at Australian Islamic Library. Among the newer translations is an Urdu translation of the first volume by Dr. Ikram-ul-Haq Yaseen. Work on the second volume is in progress. The first volume has been published by the Shari`ah Academy, at International Islamic University, Islamabad.

First and second part of Bengali translation have been published by Tawheed Publication from Bangladesh. It will be published in 23 volumes.

One volume has been translated into English and published by Dar al-Taqwa, London. The first six volumes have been translated into English by Aisha Bewley and published by Diwan Press.

== See also ==
- List of Sunni books
- List of tafsir works
- Ahkam al-Quran

== Sources ==
- Abdul Rohman; Barikli Mubaroka; Qoree Butlam (August 2023). "Methodology of Tafsir al-Qurtubi: Sources, Styles, and Manhaj". Journal of Quran and Tafseer Studies. 2 (2). Muhammadiyah University of Surakarta: 180–202. doi:10.23917/qist.v2i2.1451. eISSN 2828-2779.
- Abdullah Bayram (5 June 2020). "The Method of Application of Commentary of the Qur'an with Sunnah by Qurtubî: From the Perspective of the Various Tools and Techniques Used by the Mufassir". İslami İlimler Dergisi. 15 (1). Balıkesir University: 95–113. doi:10.34082/islamiilimler.748713. eISSN 3023-7661. ISSN 1306-7044.
- Edi Sutardi; Khadher Ahmad (27 December 2024). "Analysis of the Interpretations of Imam Al-Qurtubi and Muhammad Quraish Shihab on Verses about Riba and Their Implications for Financial Awareness". Mashadiruna Jurnal Ilmu Al-Qurân dan Tafsir. 3 (3). State Islamic University of Sunan Gunung Djati: 181–190. doi:10.15575/mjiat.v3i3.38407. eISSN 2963-4482.
- Mohd Sholeh Sheh Yusuff; Yusuf Haji-Othman; Mukhamad Hadi Musolin Subagio (10 May 2021). "A Critical Analysis of The Influence Of Tafsir Al-Qurtubi In Tafsir Nur Al-Ihsan Based On Genetic Approach". Turkish Journal of Computer and Mathematics Education. 12 (1): 4684–4688. doi:10.17762/turcomat.v12i11.6640.
