= Ahkam al-Qur'an (al-Harrasi) =

Islamic juridical exegesis

- Author: Al-Kiyā al-Harrāsī
- Original title: أحكام القرآن
- Language: Arabic
- Genre: Tafsir
- Publisher: Dar Al-Kotob Al-Ilmiyah
- Publication date: 1 January 2001
- Publication place: Beirut, Lebanon
- Pages: 1088
- ISBN: 978-2-7451-0245-4

Aḥkām al-Qurʾān (Arabic: أحكام القرآن, lit. 'Rulings of the Qur'an') is an early juridical Qur'ānic exegesis authored by the Shāfi'ī scholar Al-Kiyā al-Ḥarrāsī (d. 504/1110). It is regarded as one of the most important works within the Shāfi'ī school of Islamic law and the earliest complete tafsīr al-aḥkām to have survived from this tradition. The work systematically interprets the legal rulings (aḥkām) of the Qur'ān according to Shāfiʿī legal principles, offering evidential support for the school’s rulings while engaging critically with the positions of other madhāhib, particularly the Ḥanafī school. Aḥkām al-Qur'ān is classified as al-Tafsir al-Tahlili (analytical commentary).

== Background ==
Al-Kiyā al-Harrāsī composed Aḥkām al-Qur'ān with the objective of elucidating the methodological approach employed by al-Shāfi'ī in deriving intricate legal rulings from the revealed texts. His work aimed to demonstrate, through detailed exegetical reasoning, the soundness and coherence of al-Shāfi'ī's interpretive method in jurisprudence.

The composition of this tafsīr also served as a direct intellectual response to the strong sectarian bias exhibited by al-Jaṣṣāṣ in his own Aḥkām al-Qur'ān. Al-Harrāsī perceived the necessity of addressing the criticisms and polemical assertions that al-Jaṣṣāṣ had advanced against Imām al-Shāfiʿī. Through his own legal-oriented exegesis, al-Harrāsī sought to defend the Shāfi'ī school and to reassert the methodological and theological validity of its principles.

The underlying motivation for this work lies in al-Harrāsī's commitment to fortifying the legal school to which he adhered. By composing Aḥkām al-Qurʾān, he intended to tarjīḥ (prefer and substantiate) particular legal opinions within the Shāfi'ī tradition, especially those which Imām al-Shāfiʿī himself had not treated exhaustively.

This objective is explicitly reflected in the introduction (muqaddimah) of the work, where al-Harrāsī reveals his pronounced devotion to the Shāfiʿī school. In his preface, he declares:

“Indeed, the Shāfiʿī madhhab is the most upright and correct, the best and the wisest. All the views of the Shāfiʿī madhhab surpass the bounds of conjecture (ẓann), attaining the level of certainty (yaqīn).”

He further clarifies the rationale behind his composition, stating:

“When I came to recognize the excellence of the Shāfiī school in all its aspects, I authored Aḥkām al-Qurʾān as an explanatory commentary of this madhhab.”

== Methodology ==
The exegetical (tafsīr) method employed by al-Kiyā al-Harrāsī can be summarized in the following six orders:

1. First, he presents each surah of the Qur'an in order, following the canonical arrangement (mushaf).
2. Second, he identifies the portions of verses that contain elements of law (ḥukm), and then provides their interpretation. Afterward, he extracts the legal rulings contained within them and discusses the opinions of the scholars related to those rulings.
3. Third, in his interpretation, al-Harrāsī employs the hadiths of Muhammad, the interpretations of the companions, and those of the Tabi'in (the generation after the companions), before expressing the opinion that he deems correct.
4. Fourth, al-Harrāsī addresses khilāfiyyāt (juridical disagreements) that arise between the Hanafi and Shafi'i schools of thought. He includes rebuttals and commentary on al-Jassas and his arguments. In this regard, al-Kiya al-Harrasi frequently states, “Abu Hanifa held the opinion that… whereas al-Shafi‘i differed with him,” or, “Abu Hanifa opined… but al-Shafi'i maintained…” His strong attachment to the Shafi'i school often leads him to assert that opposing views — especially those of Abu Hanifa — are incorrect. Thus, one often encounters statements such as “this opinion is not correct” or “this opinion is invalid” following the presentation of Abu Hanifa's views.
5. Fifth, the verses discussed by al-Kiya al-Harrasi in his tafsir are not limited solely to those containing legal and jurisprudential implications; he also provides interpretations of verses that deal with issues of creed (aqidah) and theology (kalam).
6. Sixth, when encountering isrāʼīliyyāt (narratives of Jewish or Christian origin) in the transmitted reports concerning the interpretation of a verse, he does not include them in his commentary. He cites only those reports that he deems reliable and defensible.

== Features ==
The features of Tafsīr Aḥkām al-Qurʾān include the following:

- Comprehensive coverage of legal verses: Almost all verses that, according to al-Harrāsī, contain elements of legal rulings are discussed in this tafsīr. Even verses that, at first glance, seem unrelated to law are analyzed, and their underlying legal implications are revealed and explained by him.
- Concise and accessible interpretation: His exegesis is brief, clear, and easy to understand, especially for jurists (fuqahāʾ), particularly those of the Shāfi'ī school. This makes the work highly beneficial for those seeking to better comprehend their own legal school.
- Reliability of narrations: Al-Harrāsī exercises great caution in using transmitted reports (riwāyāt). The narrations he employs as evidence are carefully selected and verifiable. This meticulousness reflects his background as a muḥaddith (scholar of ḥadīth).
- Respectful tone in debate: When refuting al-Jaṣṣāṣ, al-Harrāsī maintains a polite and refined tone, unlike al-Jaṣṣāṣ, who was often harsh in criticizing the Shāfi'ī school, or Ibn al-ʿArabī, who was equally sharp toward both al-Shāfiʿī and Abū Ḥanīfa in his Ahkam al-Qur'an. Al-Harrāsī's eloquence and gentle manner of expression set him apart in this respect.
- Integrated methodology: His method combines features of thematic tafsīr (tafsīr mawḍūʿī) — as he does not restrict himself solely to legal topics — and analytical tafsīr (tafsīr taḥlīlī), as he interprets verses sequentially according to the order of the sūrahs. However, he occasionally omits verses or chapters that he deems unrelated to legal themes.

== Legacy ==
The work Aḥkām al-Qurʾān by al-Kiyā al-Harrāsī is regarded as one of the most significant contributions within the Shāfiʿī school, particularly in the domain of tafsīr fiqhī (juridical exegesis). It represents the earliest extant and comprehensive work of its kind in the Shāfiʿī tradition that has survived to the present day. Although another Aḥkām al-Qurʾān is attributed to Imām al-Shāfiʿī himself and later compiled by al-Bayhaqi, that version does not encompass all of the āyāt al-aḥkām (legal verses) in their entirety.

== Editions ==
The tafsīr Aḥkām al-Qurʾān of al-Kiyā al-Harrāsī exists in a large manuscript preserved in Egyptian National Library and Archives and Al-Azhar library. In 1974, the book was critically edited (taḥqīq) by Mūsā Muḥammad ʿAlī and ʿIzzat ʿAbd al-ʿAṭiyyah, and published in Cairo by Dār al-Kutub al-Ḥadīthah. It was also printed by Dār al-Kutub al-ʿIlmiyyah in Beirut in 1405 AH / 1985 CE. The work comprises four parts (juzʾ), compiled into two volumes, measuring 24 cm in size.

== See also ==
- List of Sunni books
- List of tafsir works

== Sources ==
- Muhammad Taufiki (2 October 2017). "Manhaj Tafsir Al-Kiya Al-Harrasi Dalam Ahlam al-Qur'an". Jurnal Komunikasi antar Perguruan Tinggi Agama Islam. 16 (2). Syarif Hidayatullah State Islamic University Jakarta: 197–204. doi:10.15408/kordinat.v16i2.6449. eISSN 2654-8038. ISSN 1411-6154.
- Nurul Hidayati (20 March 2025). "Madhab fanaticism in Ahkam al-Quran by al-Kiya al-Harrasi: Analysis of the Interpretation of al-Baqarah [2]: 173 concerning Fish and Grasshopper Carcasses". AT-TAHBIR: Journal of Al-Qur'an Studies and Tafsir. 1 (2). Sunan Ampel State Islamic University Surabaya: 63–79.
- Lailatul Mu'jizat (29 December 2024). "Hakikat Menyentuh Mushaf Al-Qur'an: Tafsir Ahkam Al-Quran Karya Al-Kiya Al-Harrasi dan Tafsir Al-Misbah Karya Muhammad Qurais Shihab". Muqaranah. 8 (2). Universitas Islam Negeri Raden Fatah: 97–111. doi:10.19109/tng5gs65. eISSN 2809-4832. ISSN 2809-3658.
- Bayu Aji Prasetyo (26 June 2024). “Manahij Istinbāth Penafsiran Ayat-Ayat Zakat dalam Tafsir Ahkām al-Qur’an Karya al-Kiyā al-Harrāsī (w. 450 H/504 H)” (PDF) (PhD thesis) (in Malay). Indonesia: Universitas Islam Negeri Sultan Syarif Kasim. pp. 1–128.
- Ahmet Çelik (June 2017). "As an Ashʿarī and Shāfi'ī Scholar al-Kiyā al-Harrāsī and Theological Dimension of His Book Aḥkām al-Qurʾān". Cumhuriyet Theology Journal. 21 (1). Sivas Cumhuriyet University: 489–512. doi:10.18505/cuid.306390. eISSN 2528-987X. ISSN 2528-9861.
