= Ahkam al-Qur'an (Ibn al-Arabi) =

Islamic juridical exegesis

Aḥkām al-Qurʾān
- Editor: Muhammed Abdul Qadir Ata
- Author: Abū Bakr ibn al-ʿArabī
- Original title: أحكام القرآن
- Language: Arabic
- Genre: Tafsir
- Publisher: Dar Al-Kotob Al-Ilmiyah
- Publication date: 2012
- Publication place: Beirut, Lebanon
- Pages: 2240
- ISBN: 9782745102447

Aḥkām al-Qurʾān (Arabic: أحكام القرآن, lit. 'Rulings of the Qur'an') is a multi-volume juridical Qur'ānic exegesis authored by the Andalusian Mālikī scholar Abū Bakr ibn al-ʿArabī (d. 1148 CE). The book interprets the Qur'anic verses related to legal rulings (aḥkām), examining their meanings through linguistic, contextual, and juristic analysis. Drawing on the Sunnah and the views of various legal schools, Ibn al-ʿArabī offers a systematic treatment of Islamic law as derived from the Quran. The work is regarded as one of the foundational Mālikī contributions to legal exegesis and an important reference for later scholars, including al-Qurṭubī.

== Methodology ==
Among Ibn al-'Arabī's most significant contributions, Aḥkām al-Qur'ān occupies a prominent place. Structured according to the canonical order of the Quran, the work analyzes 106 surahs that contain verses pertaining to legal rulings (aḥkām), offering detailed commentary on a total of 852 such verses. Surahs that do not include any legal material—such as al-Qamar, al-Ḥāqqa, al-Nāzi'āt, al-Takwīr, al-Infiṭār, al-Qāri‘a, al-Humazah, and al-Kāfirūn are omitted. Ibn al-'Arabī opens his exegesis of each surah by specifying the number of legal verses it contains, and introduces every verse by indicating how many discrete legal questions (masā'il) it addresses.

In deriving rulings, Ibn al-'Arabī grounds his reasoning in linguistic analysis, the Sunnah, and the practical precedent of the Companions. When employing hadith evidence, he carefully evaluates reports through the lens of jarḥ wa ta‘dīl (criticism and authentication of transmitters) and deliberately avoids weak narrations. In instances where sound hadiths are unavailable, he prioritizes the established practice of the Companions, thereby aligning himself with the methodological approach of Mālik ibn ʾAnas regarding the authority of ‘amal ahl al-Madīnah (the practice of the people of Medina). Notably, he also demonstrates a conscious effort to exclude Isrā’īliyyāt (Judeo-Christian traditions) from his exegesis.

Throughout the work, Ibn al-'Arabī often supports his interpretations by cross-referencing related Qur'anic verses and elucidating their interconnections. His commentary reflects an awareness of the broader juristic discourse: he frequently presents the opinions of other legal schools (madhāhib), juxtaposing them with those of his own Mālikī tradition. While he defends Mālikī positions with rigorous reasoning and persuasive argumentation, his discussions generally exhibit an impartial and analytical engagement with differing viewpoints. Alongside this intertextual approach, he makes use of variant readings (qirāʾāt), the circumstances of revelation (asbāb al-nuzūl), and the concept of abrogation (naskh), which together illustrate his mastery of the Qur’anic sciences and his concern for contextual and chronological coherence in interpretation.

Ibn al-ʿArabī's Ahkām al-Qur'ān is characterized by a rigorous and multifaceted exegetical method that combines linguistic precision, juristic reasoning, and the principles of the Qur'anic sciences. His interpretation reflects a systematic engagement with the Qur'an as both a divine revelation and a source of legal authority.

From a linguistic perspective, Ibn al-ʿArabī closely analyses vocabulary, syntax, and rhetorical structure, distinguishing between literal (ẓāhir) and contextual (siyāq) meanings to resolve ambiguities in the text. This attention to language serves as the foundation for his derivation of legal rulings, ensuring that every judgment remains grounded in the textual and semantic fabric of the Qur'an.

Jurisprudentially, Ibn al-ʿArabī draws primarily on Mālikī legal theory while engaging critically with other schools of law. His method of istimdād, the extraction of rulings from authoritative sources is informed by the principles of uṣūl al-fiqh, including analogy (qiyās), consensus (ijmāʿ), and textual reasoning (dalīl naṣṣī). Although he defends Mālikī positions, his treatment of opposing opinions is marked by analytical balance and evidentiary argumentation rather than partisanship.

His exegetical framework thus operates through an analytical (taḥlīlī) synthesis: linguistic and textual analysis is combined with transmitted reports (riwāyāt), prophetic traditions, and the practice of the Companions. By uniting these elements, Ibn al-ʿArabī constructs a methodology that is both juristically grounded and textually disciplined, reflecting the intellectual rigor of the Mālikī school while contributing to the broader tradition of legal exegesis in Islam.

== Features ==
In Aḥkām al-Qurʾān, Ibn al-ʿArabī employed a multifaceted exegetical method characterized by both systematic legal analysis and an integrative scholarly approach. His methodology can be outlined in seven principal features:

1. Classification-based exegesis: Ibn al-ʿArabī organized his commentary around a masʾalah (legal-issue) classification system. Each Qurʾānic verse was discussed in relation to specific jurisprudential questions, often with detailed linguistic, theological, and legal analysis. He consistently derived fiqhī rulings (istinbāṭ al-aḥkām), drawing on principles of uṣūl al-fiqh, Arabic rhetoric, Qurʾānic sciences (such as asbāb al-nuzūl and qirāʾāt), and authentic prophetic traditions.
2. Combination of detailed and concise interpretation: While the dominant style of Aḥkām al-Qurʾān is analytical (tafsīlī), Ibn al-ʿArabī occasionally employed a concise (ijmālī) approach when the context required brevity. These summaries often emphasized the practical legal meaning of a verse, focusing directly on the intended ruling or moral implication rather than on extended linguistic or theological exposition.
3. Limited use of thematic (mawḍūʿī) interpretation: Although primarily analytical, Ibn al-ʿArabī sometimes adopted a thematic approach by grouping together verses dealing with related legal or moral subjects. For instance, he connected several verses on combat or testimony across different chapters, demonstrating their interrelation within a unified legal and ethical framework.
4. Confidence and intellectual humility: Ibn al-ʿArabī displayed a distinctive balance between scholarly confidence (al-thiqqah bi al-nafs) and humility (al-iʿtidād bi al-ʿulamāʾ). He often acknowledged the interpretive challenges (musykilāt) faced by earlier scholars, presenting his reasoning while recognizing the broader intellectual tradition of Islamic jurisprudence and exegesis.
5. Use of cross-referencing (iḥālah): He frequently directed readers to his other works for more detailed discussions, a technique known as iḥālah. This allowed him to avoid repetition and maintain brevity in his commentary. However, some of the referenced works, such as Uṣūl al-Masāʾil and Masāʾil al-Khilāf, have not survived, which presents challenges for later researchers seeking to reconstruct his full line of reasoning.
6. Educational and ethical dimension (tarbawiyyah): Ibn al-ʿArabī infused his tafsīr with pedagogical and spiritual reflections, including supplications (dua), moral exhortations (taujīh), and guidance (irshādāt) for students of knowledge. Through expressions invoking divine aid and enlightenment, he underscored the intrinsic link between intellectual pursuit and moral-spiritual development.
7. Reliance on authentic hadith sources: He placed strong emphasis on using only ṣaḥīḥ (sound) ḥadīths in his interpretations, explicitly citing the canonical collections of al-Bukhārī, Muslim, al-Tirmidhī, Abū Dāwūd, and al-Nasāʾī. Although he occasionally referred to other major collections, such as Musnad Ahmad or Sunan al-Bayhaqī, his guiding principle was to rely solely on narrations with verified chains of transmission, avoiding ḍaʿīf (weak) reports.

== Legacy ==
Aḥkām al-Qur'ān is held in high regard not only among Mālikī scholars but also within other legal traditions, attaining recognition as an authoritative source in both tafsir and fiqh. Its influence within the Mālikī school is exemplified by al-Qurṭubī (d. 671/1273), who drew extensively upon Aḥkām al-Qur'ān throughout his own monumental commentary, al-Jāmi‘ li-Aḥkām al-Qur'ān.

== Edition ==
Manuscript copies of Aḥkām al-Qur'ān are preserved in several libraries. The work was first published under the auspices of the Moroccan Sultan Muḥammad Rafī‘ ‘Abd al-Ḥafīẓ (Cairo, 1331/1913, 2 vols.), though this edition suffered from several deficiencies: the Qur'anic verses were unvocalized and unnumbered, the work lacked an index, and various typographical errors were present. A critical edition was later prepared by ‘Alī Muḥammad al-Bijāwī (Cairo, 1377–1378/1957–1958, 4 vols.), who subsequently reissued a revised version (Cairo, 1387/1967; 1392/1972). In his edition, Bijāwī numbered the verses, clarified obscure terms, traced hadiths to their original sources, and identified poetic citations. He also compared the text with other tafsīr works that cite it, particularly al-Qurṭubī’s commentary, and appended to each volume an index of surahs and verses. The fourth volume contains an expanded index encompassing both verses and thematic discussions, as well as an alphabetically arranged analytical index indicating the locations of legal rulings within the work.

== See also ==
- Ahkam al-Qur'an (al-Jassas)
- Ahkam al-Qur'an (Jalal)
- List of tafsir works

== Sources ==
- Eni Zulaiha; Taryudi Taryudi (3 July 2023). "An Analysis of the Special Methodology of the Tafsir Aḥkām al-Qur'ān by Ibn al-'Arabī". Jurnal Iman dan Spiritualitas. 3 (2). Sunan Gunung Djati State Islamic University Bandung: 219–226. doi:10.15575/jis.v3i2.25615. eISSN 2775-4596.
- Sakhi Rehman, Safi Ullah, Muhammad Aslam Khan (13 July 2025). "A Comparative Study of Social Problems in Surah An-Nur in Light of Ahkam Al-Quran by Al-Jassas and Ahkam Al-Quran by Al-Arabi". Advance Social Science Archive Journal. 4 (1). Scholarium Education and Research: 712–724. eISSN 3006-2500. ISSN 3006-2497.
- Anis Kusumawardani, Kharis Nugroho, Abdullah Mahmud, Mutohharun Jinan4, Andri Nirwana (10 November 2024). "Relevance of the Book of Tafsir Ahkamul Qur'an by Ibn Al-'Arabi to the book of Fiqh Al-Mughni by Ibn Qudamah (Case Study of Q.S. Al-Baqarah verse 229)". AL-AFKAR:Journal for Islamic Studies. 7 (4): 783–797. doi:10.31943/afkarjournal.v7i4.1673. eISSN 2614-4905. ISSN 2614-4883.
- Sadia Noreen, Hafiz Muhammad Ishaq (1 January 2022). "A research review of the method and style of Qazi Ibn Al-Arabi in Ahkam-ul-Quran". International Research Journal on Islamic Studies. 4 (1): 83–96. doi:10.54262/irjis.04.01.u07. eISSN 2710-3749. ISSN 2664-4959.
