= Interfaith marriage in Islam =

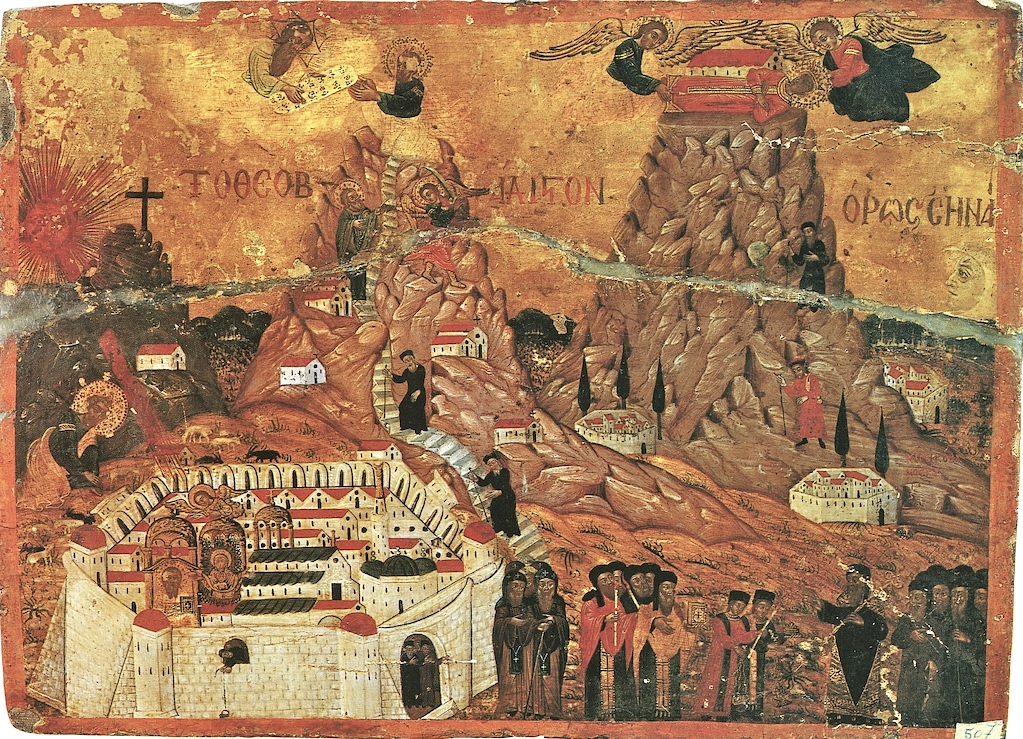
Interfaith marriage between Muslims and Christians is discussed in the Ashtiname of Muhammad, a treaty that was recorded between Muhammad and the abbots of Saint Catherine's Monastery, which is depicted in this icon.

In traditionalist interpretations of Islam, the permissibility for Muslims to engage in interfaith marriages is outlined by the Quran: it is permissible, albeit discouraged, for a Muslim man to marry non-Muslim women as long as they are identified as being part of the "People of the Book" (Christians, Jews, and Sabians), while it is not permissible for a Muslim woman to marry a non-Muslim man (although there is no clear textual prohibition against it in the Qur'an itself, nor in the Sunnah of Prophet Muhammed, as noted by modern times scholars). Thus, traditional interpretations of Islamic law do recognize the legitimacy of a Muslim man's marriage (nikaah) if he marries a non-Muslim woman, but only if she is Jewish, Christian, or Sabian.

On the other hand, according to the traditional understanding of interfaith marriage in Islam, Muslim women are forbidden from intermarrying with non-Muslim men based on the interpretations of different Muslim scholars regarding the Islamic law. Additionally, it is required in Islam that the children of an interfaith marriage be Muslim. In Lebanon, children are officially registered in their father's religious group. If the father is Christian, families usually expect the children to be baptized. If the father is Muslim and the mother is Christian, couples often agree to baptize the children as a compromise. This is mainly to win approval of the mother's Christian family. These baptisms usually happen privately, so the children stay Muslim, like their father. Sometimes, the baptism is arranged privately to keep the children's options open. This way, they can choose their own religion once they turn eighteen.

The tradition of reformist and progressive Islam, on the other hand, permits marriages between Muslim women and non-Muslim men; Islamic scholars opining this view include Pakistani-American Muslim feminist Shehnaz Haqqani, Guyanese-American professor Khaleel Mohammed, American activist Daayiee Abdullah, and Sudanese politician Hassan al-Turabi, among others. They argue that nor the Qur'an, nor the Sunnah of the Prophet doesn't prohibit marriage to people of the Book and ban was due the Patriarchal nature of the time and that the Muslim women have much better protections of their religious practice in modern times.

In some societies outside the traditional dar al-islam, interfaith marriages between Muslims and non-Muslims are not uncommon, including marriages that, in Sunni Islam, contradict the historic understanding of ijmāʿ (the consensus of fuqāha) as to the bounds of legitimacy.

== Islamic tradition ==
=== Permissibility and conditions ===
In general, while Muslim men are allowed to marry non-Muslim women, the Quran instructs them to take measures to avoid such acts and instead marry Muslim women. No such allowances are made for Muslim women, for whom interfaith marriage is strictly forbidden according to the traditional interpretation of male Muslim scholars. It is worth mentioning that the Quran forbids just marriage to polytheists, in Surah al-Baqarah, for both men and women. However, there is no place where it forbids women to marry the "People of the Book" - identified as Christians, Jews and Sabeans.

There is Muslim men who do engage in an interfaith marriage must ensure that the non-Muslim woman in question can be identified as being among the "People of the Book" and is actively religious; if she renounces her faith and does not convert to Islam, the marriage is automatically invalidated. Due to the complications associated with marrying a non-Muslim woman—particularly the possibility that the couple's children may choose to follow the wife's faith instead of Islam or be irreligious altogether—many Islamic scholars discourage or outright forbid all interfaith marriages.

==== For Muslim women ====
Although the Quran contains no explicit prohibition for Muslim women marrying non-Muslim men - except for polytheists, some scholars argue that the fact that it only mentions the allowance for Muslim men means that Muslim women are prohibited from interfaith marriages. Kuwaiti-American professor Khaled Abou el-Fadl writes that he did not find a single Islamic scholar in classical jurisprudence who disagreed with the prohibition of marriage between Muslim women and non-Muslim men.

On the other hand, forbidding the polytheist marriage and the rhetorical challenge in Surah An Nahl 16:116 ("And do not say about what your tongues assert of untruth, 'This is lawful and this is unlawful,' to invent falsehood about Allah. Indeed, those who invent falsehood about Allah will not succeed.") is a basis for the legitimacy of interfaith marriage with People of the Book (based on the principle of permissibility), since the polytheists and the "People of the Book" are considered 2 different categories).

The Hadith presents evidence for Umar validating an interfaith marriage. In Mussanaf abd al-Razzaq, it is related how a Muslim woman was brought to a Umar, after conversion - while being married to a Christian. Instead of separating the Marriage - how the Quran requires for an invalid marriage, Umar said: "Give her a choice: if She wishes, she can separate from him, and if she wishes, she can stay with him" The ruling shows that Umar potentially believed a Muslim woman was indeed allowed to be married to a non-Muslim. Modern times scholars argue that by not separating the marriage immediately or telling her to "wait", and instead giving her the choice to remain or separate with him, Umar showed that a non-Muslim man do not inherently render a marriage invalid, paving the path for a Muslim woman to be in an interfaith marriage (so it is not haram), particularly with someone from the people of the Book.

Additionally, Mussanaf abd al-Razzaq also notes two rulings (involving Ali and Ibrahim al Nakha'i) that offer a different perspective to Surah al-Mumtahanah 60:10, which notes: "When the believing women come to you as emigrants, test their intentions—their faith is best known to Allah—and if you find them to be believers, then do not send them back to the disbelievers. These are not lawful for the disbelievers, nor are the disbelievers lawful for them", matching the understanding that it refers to political rule of disbelievers as the impediment in the verse, as written by Hanafi scholoar Imam Abu Bakar al-Jassas in Akham al Qur'an.

The key word used is (mūhājirātin). It is an active participle, feminine plural, accusative case meaning "immigrants". The root is (h - j - r/ه-ج-ر), referring to immigration. The context of the revelation of Surah 60:10 is related to the treaty of Hudaybiyyah, which demanded the women that fled Mecca, to be returned under the political autority of the Qurayish pagans. The text of 60:10 says: "لَا هُنَّ حِلٌّۭ لَّهُمْ وَلَا هُمْ يَحِلُّونَ لَهُنَّ ۖ", which translates by: "They [referring to the disbelievers - the Quayish, a masculine plural] are not lawful for them [feminine plural referring to female immigrants fleeding the political rule of the Qurayish], and they[female plural pronoun referring to immigrants] are not lawful for them[masculine plural pronoun referring to the Quayish pagan disbelievers]".

Noteworthy, the original arabic text does not contain the words "husband" or "wife" when talking about the lawfulness.

Finally, as a Ruler, and second of the Rashiduns, Umar - by permitting the continuation (by giving the woman the choice) - offered a validation of the status quo of the marriage, creating a existent, yet isolated, precedent in the Islamic Law. Likewise, Ali as the fourth of the Rashiduns and the first Shia Imam, Noteworthy, the legal precedent is particularly important, as no one in Islamic law has the right to validate a invalid contract, showing that a non-Muslim husband can potentially be legitimate.

=== Conduct with Christian women ===
In the case of a Christian–Muslim marriage, which is to be contracted only after permission from the Christian party, the Christian wife is not to be prevented from attending church nor from engaging in her own prayer and worship. This conduct is according to the Ashtiname of Muhammad, which was signed between Muhammad and Saint Catherine's Monastery in 623 CE.

== Modern practice ==
=== Prevalence and attitudes ===
Despite Sunni Islam prohibiting Muslim women from marrying non-Muslim men, interfaith marriages between Muslim women and non-Muslim men take place at substantial rates, contravening the traditional Sunni understanding of ijmāʿ. The modern tradition of reformist and progressive Islam has also come to permit marriages between Muslim women and non-Muslim men, with Islamic scholars opining this view including Muslim feminist Shehnaz Haqqani, Khaleel Mohammed, Daayiee Abdullah, and Hassan al-Turabi, among others. In the United States, for example, about 10% of Muslim women are married to non-Muslim men, and about one in ten Muslims are married to non-Muslims overall, including about one in six Muslims under the age of 40, and about 20% of Muslims who describe themselves as less devoutly religious.

Recent studies on interfaith marriages in Muslim-majority countries have shown that parental attitudes remain more negative toward marriage of a daughter as compared to a son, and that "stronger religious belief was associated with more negative attitudes"; this was less in the case of Muslims who perceived Islam and Christianity as more similar than distinct. In addition to legal and religious restrictions, interfaith marriages are often shaped by social pressures, including concerns about family reputation, community expectations, and the risk of social exclusion or estrangement. Despite formal prohibitions in many interpretations of Islamic law, interfaith marriages continue to occur, reflecting a gap between religious norms and everyday practices, particularly in urban and diasporic contexts. Deeb interviewed 192 Lebanese people, mostly between 2016 and 2018. She found that when parents objected to a child marrying a person of a other religion, the main reason was usually not the difference in religion itself. Deebs' research provided a list of parents' concerns on this topic, religious difference came in sixth on the list itself. The most common worry (by half of the objecting parents) was what other people would think, the social aspect. Parents who described themselves as secular, objected as much as religious parents. Some religious parents said their faith actually helped them accept their child' chosen partner.

=== Legality in Muslim-majority countries ===
In most Arab countries, interfaith marriages are allowed as long as the husband is Muslim and the wife is Jewish or Christian. There are, however, some Arab countries that do not enforce such laws: in Lebanon, there is no civil personal status law and marriages are performed according to the religion of the spouses; and it has been legal for women in Tunisia to marry men of any faith or of no faith since 2017. As a result, interfaith couples in Lebanon often face legal obstacles and may marry abroad (commonly in Cyprus) or convert in order to have their marriage recognized.

Turkey allows marriages between Muslim women and non-Muslim men through secular laws. In Malaysia, a non-Muslim must convert to Islam in order to marry a Muslim, and any children produced from unions involving a Muslim are automatically registered as Muslims at birth.

== See also ==
- Interfaith marriage
  - Interfaith marriage in Judaism
  - Interfaith marriage in Christianity
- Islam and other religions
  - Islam and Judaism
  - Islam and Christianity
- Marriage in Islam
  - Cousin marriage in the Middle East
  - Women in Islam
