= Imad al-Din =

Imad al-Din or Imad ad-Din (Arabic: عماد الدين, romanized: ʿImād al-Dīn), also Imad ud-din, is a male Muslim given name meaning "pillar of the religion, faith", composed from the nouns ‘imad, meaning pillar, and al-Din, of the faith.

This theophoric name is formed from the Arabic male given name Imad.

Other written variants are Imadaddin, Imaduddin, Emadeddin, etc.

Notable bearers of the name include:

- Al-Kiya al-Harrasi (1058–1110), Islamic scholar
- Imad al-Din Zengi (c. 1085–1146), emir of Mosul and Aleppo
- Imad ad-Din al-Isfahani (1125–1201), Persian poet and historian
- Amadin, 13th-century Yazidi saint
- Imadaddin Nasimi (1369–1417), Azerbaijani Ḥurūfī poet
- Idris Imad al-Din (1392–1468), head of the Tayyibi Isma'ili community and historian
- Imad al-Din Mahmud ibn Mas‘ud Shirazi (mid 16th century), Persian physician
- Muhammad Imaduddin I (1580–1648), sultan of the Maldives
- Muhammad Imaaduddeen IV (died 1882), sultan of the Maldives
- Muhammad Imaaduddeen V (died 1893), sultan of the Maldives
- Imad ud-din Lahiz (1830–1900), Islamic writer who converted to Christianity
- Muhammad Imaaduddeen VI (1868–1932), sultan of the Maldives
- Imad-ad-Dean Ahmad (born 1948), American Muslim scholar
- Emad El-Din Mohamed Abdel Moneim Fayed, known as Dodi Fayed (1955–1997), Egyptian film producer
- Emadeddin Baghi (born 1962), Iranian journalist and political activist
- Ja'far us Sadiq Imaduddin (born 1973), Indian Scholar
- Imaduddin (ICMI) (1931–2008), Indonesian religious and political activist
- Imad Eddin Barakat Yarkas, also known as Abu Dahdah, Syrian-born Spaniard sentenced to prison in Spain for his part in the September 11, 2001 attacks
