= Tabarruj =

Islamic term relating to modesty in dress

Tabarruj (Arabic: تبرج tabarruj / tabarruj) is an Islamic term which refers to a Muslim displaying their beauty in a way deemed inappropriate by Islamic standards. It is often used to refer to a follower who fails to observe hijab, modest clothing in fitting and length, and lowering of the gaze. The term also encompasses a general attitude in social interactions. Those who engage in tabarruj are called muttabarijat (Arabic: متبرجات mutabarrijat).

== Etymology and definitions ==
The word "Tabarruj" is derived from the noun burj (Arabic: بُرْج), which literally refers to a prominent building such as a tower or castle. Tabarruj thus refers to a display of beauty in a prominent or highly visible position.

A number of definitions of the term are found in classical Islamic literature:

- Mujahid said, "Women used to go out walking in front of men, and this was the Tabarruj of Jahiliyyah (pre-Islamic ignorance).''
- Qatadah said, "When they go out of their homes walking in a shameless and flirtatious manner, and Allah, may He be exalted, forbade that.''
- Muqatil ibn Hayyan said, "Tabarruj is when a woman puts a khimar on her head but does not tie it properly.''
- Abdullah ibn Masud said, "Tabarruj using displaying beautification in an improper place."
  - as-Suyuti said in an explanation: "Tabarruj by displaying beautification is showing off to strangers, and this is disliked. This is the explanation of 'an improper place'. It is not so if the beautification is done for the husband."

== Tabarruj in the Qur'an ==
There are two Quranic verses containing variations of the word tabarruj.

(Referring to the wives of Muhammad) “And stay in your houses and do not display yourselves (tabarrajna) like that (tabarruj) of the times of ignorance." (Q.33:33)

"And women of post-menstrual age who have no desire for marriage - there is no blame upon them for putting aside their outer garments [but] not displaying (mutabarrijatin) adornment. But to modestly refrain [from that] is better for them. And Allah is Hearing and Knowing" (Q.24.60)

== Tabarruj in hadith ==
The word tabarruj also appears in hadith.

Abu Udhaynah reported: The Messenger of Allah, peace and blessings be upon him, said, "The best of your women are loving, fertile, suitable, and comforting, if they fear Allah. The worst of your women unveil their beauty (mutabarrijat), take pride in their appearance, and they are hypocrites. None of them will enter Paradise except as rarely as you see a red-beaked crow."

== Tabarruj in Qur'anic exegesis ==
The verses on tabarruj were explained at length by all major Quranic exegetes, including at-Tabari, ibn Kathir, and al Qurtubi. Qurtubi emphasizes that the meaning of the verse includes women going out of the home without a need.

The verse was also interpreted by Sayyid Qutb, for whom it had special significance due to the importance of the concept of jahiliyyah in his writing. For Qutb, tabarruj became part of his critique of what he viewed as the modern jahiliyyah system, which he viewed as reducing human beings to a base, animalistic state. He used the principle to attack the modern practice of female participation in the formal labor force, arguing like many contemporary muslims that these practices would lead to immodesty, indecency, and sexual relationships deemed as immoral according to traditional Islamic values.

== Tabarruj in modern culture ==
The concept of tabarruj has become widespread in Muslim cultures as a means to encourage women to avoid attractive or revealing clothing, in particular through the use of memes.

These memes often include images of some type of clothing deemed as inappropriate by Islamic standards, overlain with the Quranic text about tabarruj. The memes may also contain images of make-up, which is a visual means of communicating the idea that tabarruj refers not only to revealing but also to adornment. High-heeled shoes are also depicted as a form of tabarruj, presumably due to accentuating feminine bodily features.
