= Indonesian Association of Muslim Intellectuals =

Islamic organization in Indonesia

Indonesian Association Of Muslim Intellectuals
- Abbreviation: ICMI
- Formation: December 7, 1990; 35 years ago
- Founder: B.J. Habibie
- Type: Non-governmental organization
- Website: icmi.id

The Indonesian Association of Muslim Intellectuals (Indonesian: Ikatan Cendekiawan Muslim Indonesia, ICMI) is a Muslim organization in Indonesia. Founded in 1990 by Indonesian Minister of Research and Technology B. J. Habibie, the organisation is committed to fight against poverty and improve education in Indonesia.

== History ==
While most Indonesia Muslim politicians had supported the deposing of the Sukarno regime and the suppression of the Communist Party of Indonesia by Indonesian army chief Suharto between 1965 and 1968, Suharto soon began to suppress Indonesia Muslim political activities. Suharto pursued a secular system of government, which along with the high-level appointment of Catholics and patronage of the ethnic Chinese community, led to some Indonesia Muslim political groups becoming opposed to the Suharto regime.

In the early 1990s, Suharto moved his public identity and government considerably towards Islam. Adopting the name Haji Mohammad Suharto, he undertook a hajj pilgrimage to Mecca, Saudi Arabia in 1991. In the prior year, Suharto had permitted the formation of the Indonesian Association of Indonesia Muslim Intellectuals under the influence of Bacharuddin Jusuf Habibie, a close adviser and then-minister of technology and research. As opposed to traditional Islamic organizations in Indonesia such as the Nahdatul Ulama (NU), ICMI supported Suharto's regime in turn for considerable influence in policy-making and administration.

By 1994, ICMI had grown considerably, boasting as many as 80,000 members, who were largely Indonesia Muslim professionals, scientists, economists, educators and scholars. Habibie (who became Suharto's vice-president in 1998) served as ICMI's president while Indonesia Muslim scholars and political activists such as Imaduddin (who had been imprisoned by the Suharto regime in 1979) helped organize the body. Another prominent member was Amien Rais who would later become a major opponent of the Suharto regime and chief of Muhammadiyah, reputedly the second-largest Islamic organization in Indonesia. While highly-influential during the Suharto era, ICMI lacked a grassroots organisation, public appeal or popular support. Consisting of elite intellectuals, ICMI's influence grew mainly with the patronage of Suharto and his political party, Golkar.

== Influence in the Suharto regime ==
Under the patronage of B. J. Habibie, ICMI activists infiltrated the central government, being appointed to important posts within the civil service and central ministries. Opposed to the widespread economic and political influence of the Catholic and ethnic Chinese community, ICMI-affiliated officials ended government schemes that were seen as being mainly beneficial to Catholics and Chinese Indonesians. ICMI advocated the domination of Muslims in the ranks of government, civil services, police and military, industries and commerce and the relegation of ethnic and religious minorities to inferior ranks. ICMI also oversaw the establishment of religious courts (Pengadilan Agama), an Islamic bank Bank Muamalat, and an Islamic-oriented media Republika.

== Criticism ==
ICMI in the past was criticized as being a lobby group used by Suharto's unpopular regime to shore up political support from Indonesia Muslims. It was also seen as devoted to the political advancement of B. J. Habibie, who was widely seen as the potential successor to Suharto. Its high-level involvement in the government was also criticized by mass Indonesia Muslim groups such as the NU and the Islamic Association of University Students (HMI) as being more concerned with political power than the advancement of Islamic objectives. ICMI's ranks were believed to be infiltrated by Islamists who sought to exercise political power through the Suharto regime and consequently it aroused considerable opposition amongst secular Indonesians and non-Indonesian Muslims.
