= Tafsir al-Samarqandi =

Early Sunni exegesis on the Qur'an

- Author: Abū al-Layth al-Samarqandī
- Original title: تفسير السمرقندي
- Language: Arabic
- Genre: Tafsir
- Publisher: Dar Al-Kotob Al-Ilmiyah
- Publication date: 2006
- Publication place: Beirut, Lebanon
- Pages: 1688
- ISBN: 2745154443

Baḥr al-ʿUlūm (Arabic: بَحْرُ الْعُلُومِ, lit. 'The Sea of Knowledge'), commonly known as Tafsir al-Samarqandi (Arabic: تفسير السمرقندي, lit. 'The Commentary of al-Samarqandī') authored by 10th-century Sunni scholar Abū al-Layth al-Samarqandī. It stands as one of the earliest comprehensive Qurʾānic commentaries, and is regarded as one of the “maṣādir” (primary sources) in tafsīr. It is classified as tafsīr bi-l-maʾthūr (based on transmitted reports), drawing from the Qur'an, hadith, sayings of the Companions, and the Followers (Tabi'un and Tabi' al-Tabi'in). In this tafsīr, al-Samarqandī combines linguistic, juristic, and theological analysis with moral and spiritual reflection, making it a rich resource for both scholars and students. He rarely cites weak reports, and when he does, he mentions them cautiously.

== Name ==
The title Baḥr al-ʿUlūm was not the original title given by the author himself, but became the conventional name in later generations. The more likely original title was simply Tafsīr al-Qur'ān (The Commentary on the Qur’an), or Tafsīr al-Qur'ān al-ʿAẓīm, or Tafsīr Abī al-Layth. However, the most widely used title now is Tafsir al-Samarqandi.

== Methodology ==
Imām Abū al-Layth al-Samarqandī's work entitled Tafsīr al-Samarqandī (Baḥr al-ʿUlūm) presents a careful and methodical approach to the Qurʾānic verses of rulings (aḥkām). His commentary draws on a wide range of sources, including the Qurʾān itself, Prophetic traditions, the sayings of the Companions and Successors, variant readings (qira'at), and linguistic and legal evidence. While his tafsīr is primarily rooted in the transmitted (maʾthūr) tradition, he does not rely on narration alone. Al-Samarqandī also employs rational and legal reasoning where necessary, offering critical observations on transmitted reports to clarify meanings and resolve difficulties. This balance between transmission and reflection gives his work both authenticity and analytical depth.

Abū al-Layth al-Samarqandī drew upon the linguistic heritage of early philologists such as Abū ʿUbaydah Maʿmar ibn al-Muthannā, whose influence is evident in his attention to the eloquence and structure of Qurʾānic expression. His tafsīr gives particular emphasis to the reasons for revelation (asbāb al-nuzūl), the differences in Qurʾānic recitation, and the discussions of abrogation (naskh), reflecting a comprehensive awareness of the interpretive sciences. Alongside his reliance on transmitted material, al-Samarqandī includes narrative accounts, among them the Isrāʾīliyyāt, to expand upon prophetic stories and historical contexts. Moreover, his commentary occasionally reveals a spiritual and reflective dimension, making him one of the early figures whose exegetical style anticipates the later development of Sufi interpretation (ishārī). The tafsir addresses theological matters, questions of creed, the principles of belief (usul al-din), and the pillars of Islam, while also examining legal issues and differing scholarly opinions.

== Editions ==
The book became very famous and circulated widely, preserved in multiple manuscripts. Some modern editions and studies include:

- First printed edition: by the College of Sharīʿa, University of Baghdad, published by Maktabat al-Irshād, Baghdad, first edition, 1391 AH / 1971 CE, in three volumes.
- Later critical editions and theses were also prepared (Baghdad, Cairo, etc.), in multiple volumes.

This tafsīr (Baḥr al-ʿUlūm) has been critically edited several times. Among those who worked on it are: ʿAlī Muḥammad Muʿaḍḍ, ʿĀdil Aḥmad ʿAbd al-Saʿīd, and Dr. Zakariyyā ʿAbd al-Salām. The earliest major academic effort was the edition carried out for a Master’s thesis at Baghdad University in the year 1971 CE, which was published in three complete volumes. This edition was prepared by Muḥsin Muṣṭafā.

== Translation ==
Al-Samarqandi's exegesis gained considerable popularity during the fifteenth century, leading to its translation into Turkish language several times during the Ottoman period.

== See also ==
- List of Sunni books
- List of tafsir works

== Sources ==
- Washiar Ali Husayna (31 January 2024). "Imam Abu Al-Layth Al-Samarqandi (d. 375 AH) and his Approach to his Interpretation (Bahr Al-Ulum)". Islamic Science Journal. 14 (9). University of Tikrit: 297–323. doi:10.25130/jis.23.14.9.1.15.
- Fahd ibn Abdulmun‘im Suqayr al-Sulami (June 2022). "The Statements Attributed by Imam al-Samarqandi in His Tafsir Bahr al-'Ulum to the Generality or Majority of the Exegetes, from the Beginning of Surah Maryam to the End of the Qur'an (Collection and Study)". Journal of the Faculty of Sharia and Law. 24 (4). Al-Azhar University: 3137–3192. doi:10.21608/jfslt.2022.252176.
