= Ahkam al-Qur'an (Jalal) =

Urdu legal work

- Author: Mufti Jalal al-Din Qadri
- Language: Urdu
- Subject: Juristic exegesis
- Publisher: Dar al-Sa‘adat (Gujrat)
- Publication date: 2001
- Publication place: Pakistan

Ahkam al-Qur'an is a work of juristic exegesis (tafsir) in Urdu authored by Mufti Jalal al-Din Qadri. The book focuses on the explanation and interpretation of verses of the Quran from which legal rulings (ahkam), juristic issues and the principles of lawful and unlawful are derived. Because earlier classical scholarly works on legal rulings were primarily written in Arabic, the author intended to present these rulings in Urdu to make them accessible to a broader South Asian Muslim readership.

== Features and methodology ==
According to contemporary academic analyses, the work synthesizes classical Islamic jurisprudence with modern accessibility. Its core methodological features include:

- Integration of classical sources: The text incorporates discussions from classical Arabic works on legal rulings, outlining the legal arguments and counter-evidences of various classical jurists under relevant verses.
- Language and accessibility: The commentary avoids overly complex technical terminology where possible, utilizing simplified language to cater to general readers alongside religious scholars.
- Compilation style: The author extracts and systematically organizes juristic conclusions derived by leading historical scholars and exegetes rather than offering entirely novel interpretations.
- Scope: The text functions as a comprehensive reference work for Islamic legal rulings, spanning legal, transactional and ritual matters addressed in the Quranic text.

== Structure of commentary ==
The commentary follows a consistent structural format for each analyzed verse, divided into the Quranic text, lexical explanations and final legal determinations. For example, in the commentary on Surah al-Baqarah (2:114), which addresses the obstruction of mosques, the text is organized into distinct analytical phases:

- Textual context: The analysis begins with the verse concerning those who prevent the remembrance of Allah in mosques and strive toward their ruin.
- Lexical notes: The text provides definitions for key phrases. For instance, the instruction regarding "remembrance" is defined to encompass prayers, Quranic recitation, sermons and educational gatherings. "Striving for destruction" is interpreted to mean both physical demolition and operational abandonment.
- Juristic conclusions: The commentary then enumerates specific legal rulings derived from the verse. In this sample, these include: The legal definition of a mosque as land permanently dedicated to worship, removing it from private ownership or commerce (such as sale, lease or gifting); the extension of mosque legal rulings to its courtyard; the prohibition of destroying mosques and the communal obligation to establish at least one mosque in every locality; the permanent legal status of a designated mosque site, irrespective of structural changes.

== Publication history ==
During the author's lifetime, six volumes of the work were published. The seventh volume was compiled and published posthumously under the supervision of Zia al-Qur'an Publications (Lahore). The completed set comprises approximately 3,572 pages across more than 300 chapters:

- Volume 1 (2001): Begun in May 1998 and completed in October 2000. It contains over 500 pages and derives approximately 1,200 rulings from selected verses of Surah al-Baqarah.
- Volume 2 (n.d.): 576 pages, covering rulings from Surah Al Imran and Surah An-Nisa.
- Volume 3 (2003): Covers Surah Al-Ma'idah, Surah Al-An'am, Surah Al-A'raf, and Surah Al-Anfal.
- Volume 4 (n.d.): Covers rulings from Surah At-Tawbah to Surah Hud.
- Volume 5 (n.d.): Covers Surah Yusuf to Surah Al-Kahf.
- Volume 6 (2007): Covers up to Surah An-Nur.
- Volume 7 (n.d.): Covers the remaining surahs of the Quran.

== See also ==
- Ahkam al-Qur'an (al-Jassas)
- Tafsir Naeemi, ("laws" section under each Verse)
