= Jalal al-Din Qadri =

Personal life
- Born: 29 July 1938 Gujrat District, Pakistan
- Died: May 2008 (aged 69)
- Notable work(s): Ahkam al-Qur'an

Religious life
- Religion: Islam
- Jurisprudence: Hanafi
- Creed: Sunni Islam

Mufti Muhammad Jalal al-Din Qadri (1938 – May 2008) was a Pakistani Islamic scholar, Qur’anic exegete, jurist, and researcher associated with the Sunni tradition. He is known for his scholarly contributions, particularly his Urdu exegesis Ahkam al-Qur'an, which has been discussed in academic circles.

== Name ==
His full name was Muhammad Jalal al-Din, and his kunya (agnomen) was Abu Sa‘id.

== Early life ==
He was born on 1 Jumada al-Thani 1357 AH (29 July 1938) in the village of Chuhdo, Tehsil Kharian, in Gujrat District, Pakistan. His father, Khwaj Din Mujaddidi, was known for his piety.

== Education ==
He received his early education in Qur’anic recitation and Persian from his uncle, Mawlana Fadl Din. After completing matriculation in March 1958, he began the Dars-i Nizami curriculum. He studied at Jamia Ghawthia Nizamia (Wazirabad), where he completed advanced Qur’anic study, and later studied Hadith under Mawlana Muhammad Sardar Ahmad Qadri, from whom he graduated in February 1961.

Reports state that he completed the traditional Dars-i Nizami curriculum in approximately two and a half years, a shorter period than is typical.

== Teachers ==
Among his teachers were:

- Muhammad Sardar Ahmad Qadri
- Ghulam Rasul Gujrati
- Ghulam Rasul Qadri Naushahi
- Muhibb al-Nabi
- Abd al-Ghafur Hazari

== Spiritual affiliation ==
He pledged allegiance (bay‘ah) to Muhammad Sardar Ahmad Qadri on 8 Muharram 1380 AH (22 June 1961) in the Qadri-Razvi Sufi order. In April 1965, he received authorization (ijazah) in spiritual practices and Hadith transmission from Mustafa Raza Khan.

== Career ==
He began teaching in April 1961 and served at several religious institutions, including:

- Jamia Hanafia (Kasur)
- Dar al-Ulum Ahl al-Sunnah (Jhelum)
- Jamia Hanafia Gulzar-e-Madina (Sahiwal)
- Jamia Mahmudiya Razvia (Lalamusa)

In June 1966, he entered government service as a teacher at Government High Schools in Sarai Alamgir and Kharian. During this period, he also completed the Fazil Arabi and FA examinations.

== Works ==
He authored and contributed to several works in Islamic scholarship. Some of his notable works include:

- Imam Ahmad Raza in the View of Elders (1977) – a compilation of scholarly opinions on Ahmad Raza Khan
- Islamic Educational Policy: A Review (1977)
- Khutbat-e All India Sunni Conference (1978) – documenting activities and historical context of the All India Sunni Conference
- Ahkam al-Qur'an (2001) – an Urdu exegesis focusing on legal and juristic rulings derived from Qur’anic verses
- Abu al-Kalam Azad ki Tarikhi Shikast – a critical historical study on the theories of Abu al-Kalam Azad
- Imam Ahmad Raza ka Nazriya-e-Taleem – on educational thought
- Tazkira Muhaddith-e-Azam Pakistan – a biographical work on Muhammad Sardar Ahmad Qadri
- Nawadirat Muhaddith-e-Azam Pakistan – a biographical work on Muhammad Sardar Ahmad Qadri

== Death ==
Mufti Muhammad Jalal al-Din Qadri died in May 2008.

== See also ==
- Ahkam al-Qur'an
