= Imaduddin (activist) =

Indonesian activist (1931–2008)

Imaduddin Abdulrahim (21 April 1931 – 2 August 2008), also known as Bang Imad, was an Indonesian religious and political activist and the spiritual head of the Indonesian Association of Muslim Intellectuals (ICMI). During 1960s and 1970s he served for 17 years as an electrical engineer by training at the Bandung Institute of Technology. In May 1978 Imaduddin was imprisoned for 14 months by the Suharto regime for his Islamic activism.

From 1979 he went to exile, got scholarship and studied industrial engineering in Iowa State University. After coming back to Indonesia at 1986 he moved to Jakarta, founded YAASIN (Yayasan Pembina Sari Insan) - the Foundation for the Development and Management of Human Resources and Islamic TV programme.

In December 1990, he was permitted to organise ICMI under the patronage of the Indonesian vice-president, B. J. Habibie.

His conversation (interview) with V.S. Naipaul (Nobel Laureate 2001 - Literature) is the opening "story" of the book titled "Beyond Belief"

Abdulrahim died on 2 August 2008, at the age of 77.
