= Al-Kiya al-Harrasi =

Jurist

Imam ʾIlkiyā al-Harrāsī
- إلكيا الهراسي
- Title: S̲h̲ams al-Islām; Imad al-Din; Al-Ḥāfiẓ

Personal life
- Born: 1058 Tabaristan
- Died: 1110 (aged 51–52) Baghdad, Abbasid Caliphate
- Era: Islamic golden age
- Region: Iraq
- Main interest(s): Fiqh, Usul al-Fiqh, Hadith, Tafsir, Kalam (Islamic theology)
- Notable work: Ahkam al-Qur'an
- Occupation: Scholar, Jurist, Muhaddith, Quranic exegete, Theologian, Judge

Religious life
- Religion: Islam
- Denomination: Sunni
- Jurisprudence: Shafi'i
- Creed: Ash'ari

Muslim leader
- Influenced by: Al-Shafi'i Abu Hasan al-Ash'ari Al-Juwayni
- Influenced: Abu Tahir al-Silafi Ibn Tumart Abu Mansur Muhammad Ibn Al-Saad Al Khair Al Balancy

ʾʾAbū al-Ḥasan b. Muḥammad b. ʿAlī aṭ-Ṭabarī (Arabic: أبو الحسن بن محمد بن علي الطبري), commonly known as Ilkiya al-Harrasi (Arabic: إلكيا الهراسي) was a prominent Shafi'i jurisconsult, legal theoretician, traditionist, scriptural exegete, preacher, orator, judge, and an Ash'arite theologian. He was an accomplished dialectician who was once regarded as among the foremost practitioners of disputation. He was the famous pupil of al-Juwayni and the class-mate of al-Ghazali.

== Early life ==
He was born in the year 450 AH/1058 CE in the region of Tabaristan and studied under the local ulama. He departed from his native land to seek knowledge at the age of eighteen years to Nishapur and studied jurisprudence under the direction of Imam al-Haramayn until he excelled in Islamic law. He became known as one of al-Juwayni's most outstanding students, second only to Imam al-Ghazali, as related by other scholars.

== Scholarly life ==
He then proceeded to the town of Bayhaq, where he spent several years teaching the doctrine of the Shafi'i school. Eventually, he reached to Baghdad where he came in contact with Sultan Berkyaruq. It was through the Sultan's favour where Ilkiya al-Harrasi status rose to wealth and prestige. He served under the dynasty as the chief judge of Baghdad and fulfilled his duties. Ilkiya al-Harrasi became a popular lecturer and was appointed as the head of the Nizamiyya of Baghdad. He was a famous preacher and his gatherings would be described by visitors as being huge. Ilkiya was highly skilled in fiqh, usul al-fiqh, and khilaf (legal disputation). He was an imposing scholar, known for his intellectual brilliance, eloquence, handsome appearance, and beautiful recitation.

He was a scholar of Shafi'i-Ash'ari background, but unlike his contemporary al-Ghazzali, he specialized in hadith as a separate subject and would frequently use hadith to cite evidence in his theological debates and preaching discourses. Many distinguished hadith scholars of Baghdad were among his students. The quote attributed to him: “When the horsemen of the traditions gallop about in the battlefield, the heads of analogical deductions are struck and carried off by the wind,” amply illustrates his position that hadith should be prioritised over individual reason. Ilkiya al-Harrasi and Ibn Aqil, the head of the Hanbalis in Baghdad were close sparring-partners in disputation.

== Students ==
Among the prominent students of Ilkiya al-Harrasi were:

1. Ahmad ibn ʿAli ibn Muḥammad al-Wakil, Abu al-Fath al-Baghdadi, famously known as Ibn Burhan.
2. Saʿid ibn Muḥammad ibn Aḥmad, Abu al-Mansur al-Razzaz.
3. ʿAbdullah ibn Muḥammad ibn Ghalib al-Jayli.
4. Abū ʿAbd Allāh Muḥammad Ibn Tūmart, Ibn Tumart.
5. Saʿid al-Khayr ibn Muḥammad al-Anṣari.
6. Muḥammad al-Mahdi ibn Tumart al-Shanhaji.
7. Aḥmad ibn Muḥammad ibn Ibrahim al-Salifah, Abu Tahir al-Silafi.
8. Al-Khadr ibn Naṣr ibn ʿAqil, Abu al-ʿAbbas al-Irbili.
9. ʿAbd al-Wahid ibn al-Hasan ibn Muḥammad ibn Ishaq ibn Ibrahim.
10. ʿUmar ibn Aḥmad ibn ʿIkrimah, Abu al-Qasim Ibn al-Bazzari.
11. Yusuf ibn ʿAbd al-ʿAziz, Abu al-Hajjaj al-Manuraqi.
12. Ibn Al-Saad Al Khair Al Balancy

== Death ==
He died in Baghdad during the time of afternoon on the specific date of Thursday, 1st of Muharram at the year of 504 AH corresponding to July, 1110 AD. He was buried next to the grave of Abu Ishaq al-Shirazi because of his excellent scholastic standing among Shafi'i ulama. Large crowds attended his funeral, and leaders from various Sunni schools would recite poetry. Some praised him, referring to him as "Shams al-Islam" (the Sun of Islam), while others expressed sorrow over the tragic loss.

== Reception ==
Al-Hafiz Abd al-Ghafir al-Farsi said in his book, Continuation of the History of Nishapur on page 170 about Ilkiya al-Harrasi: “He was one of the Imām al-Haramain's principal under-tutors (1); a second Abú Hāmid al-Ghazāli; nay, more profound in learning, more holy in life, more pleasing in voice, and more agreeable in countenance.”

== Works ==
Ilkiya al-Harrasi was among the most productive scholars of the Shafi‘i school, contributing significantly to Islamic scholarship. Among his major works are:

1. Ahkam al-Qur'an
2. Al-Taʿliq
3. Talwih Madarik al-Ahkam
4. Mathaliʿ al-Ahkam
5. Shifa’ al-Mustarshidin fi Mabahith al-Mujtahidin
6. Lawamiʿ al-Dala’il fi Zawaya al-Masa’il
7. Masa’il Naqd Mufradat al-Imam Ahmad

== See also ==
- List of Ash'aris
