= Ibn Saad al-Khair al-Balancy =

Arab Andalusian poet and linguist

- Born: 1116; Valencia, Almoravid dynasty
- Died: October 1175; Seville, Almohad dynasty
- Occupation(s): Linguist, literary, poet, teacher

Abu al-Hasan Ali bin Ibrahim bin Muhammad al-Ansari al-Balancy (Arabic: أبو الحسن علي بن إبراهيم بن محمد الأنصاري البلنسي) is generally known as Ibn Saad al-Khair (ابن سعد الخير), was an Arab Andalusian linguist, writer and poet. He lived in the twelfth century AD/sixth century AH. He was born and raised in Valencia. He stood out in the science of language and literature. He taught in Valencia and wrote many books, explanations and poems. He died in Seville.

== Life ==
His full name is Abu Al-Hassan Ali bin Ibrahim bin Muhammad bin Issa bin Saad al-Khair al-Ansari al-Balancy. He is of Castilian heritage. Ibn Saad al-Khair was born in the year 510 AH / 1116 AD in Valencia in the Almoravid dynasty and grew up there. He was taught by several scholars of Valencia such as : Abu al-Walid Muhammad bin Abdullah bin Khaira, and Abu al-Walid Ibn al-Dabbagh. He worked in teaching in Valencia his whole life.

Ibn Saad al-Khair was proficient in linguistic and literary sciences, an eloquent writer, and a well-described poet. He has letters and books. It was stated in al-Wafi bi al-Wafiyyat: “He was with his codification in Arabic, and his progress in literature, attributed to heedlessness that overcame him, and he had wonderful messages". Al-Dhahabi also said, "He was a master of calligraphy, an eloquent writer, a glorious poet, at birth. And there was a known heedlessness."

Ibn Saad Al Khair died in Rabi' al-Thani 571 AH / October 1175 in Seville.

== Works ==
- Al-Halal fi Sharh Al-Jamal (Alhilal Fi Sharh Aljumlu) by Al-Zajji
- Earring appended to the speech (Alqurt Almudhayil Ealaa Alkalami), for Al Mubrd
- The Emblem of the Statement and Farida Al-Oqyan (Jadhwat Albayan Wafaridat Aleuqyan)
- The unique "abbreviation of contract" (Mukhtasar Aleaqda)
- Famous Muwashshahins in Andalusia" (Mashahir Aalmuashahin Bial'andilisi), he mentioned them according to the method of conquest in Al-Mutamah
