= Neelwafurat.com =

Internet e-commerce website

- Company type: e-commerce
- Website type: e-commerce
- Available in: Arabic
- Founded: 1998
- Headquarters: Beirut, Lebanon
- Area served: Middle East
- Industry: Retail
- Products: Books, Music, DVDs, Gifts.
- Website: Neelwafurat.com
- Launched: 1998

Neelwafurat.com (Arabic: نيل و فرات.كوم) is an Internet e-commerce website, similar to amazon.com, which serves primarily the Middle East and Arab World. The company sells books, magazines, films and software.

== Overview ==
The company was founded and launched in 1998, and was part of a large boom in Arab World use of e-commerce. The name Neelwafurat is a term referring to the Nile and Euphrates rivers (neel means "Nile", "wa" is a phonetic spelling of the specific letter waw, and furat means "Euphrates"). This is a reference to the Amazon.com connection with the Amazon River.

Neelwafurat's headquarters is located in Beirut, Lebanon. There is an additional branch in Egypt.

In 2004, the two best-selling novels on Neelwafurat were Cities of Salt by Abdul-Rahman Munif and The Insane Asylum by Ghazi al-Gosaibi, however both of these books were banned in Saudi Arabia. The web retailer is seen as a primary part of Lebanon's New Economy, and is a major outlet for independent publishers.

Neelwafurat's primary competitors are adabwafan.com and e-kotob.com.
