= Abu al-Layth al-Samarqandi =

Islamic scholar of the Hanafi school (944–983)

Imam Abu al-Layth al-Samarqandi
- أبو الليث السمرقندي
- Title: Imām al-Hudā (“The Imam of Guidance”)

Personal life
- Born: 944 Samarqand, Samanid Empire
- Died: 983 (aged 38–39) Samarqand
- Era: Islamic Golden Age
- Region: Transoxiana
- Main interest(s): Fiqh, Tafsir
- Notable work: Tafsir al-Samarqandi
- Occupation: Scholar, Jurist, Mufassir

Religious life
- Religion: Islam
- Denomination: Sunni
- Jurisprudence: Hanafi
- Creed: Maturidi

Muslim leader
- Influenced by: Abu Hanifa Abu Mansur al-Maturidi

ʾAbū al-Layth Naṣr ibn Muḥammad al-Samarqandī (Arabic: أبو الليث نصر بن محمد السمرقندي), more commonly known as Abū al-Layth al-Samarqandī (Arabic: أبو الليث السمرقندي), was a renowned Hanafi jurist and Qur'anic exegete from Samarqand in Transoxiana (modern-day Uzbekistan). He lived during the 4th century AH / 10th century CE, a flourishing period of Islamic scholarship in Central Asia. Celebrated as one of the foremost scholars of the Hanafi school, al-Samarqandī became widely known as Imām al-Hudā (“The Imam of Guidance”) for his deep knowledge, piety, and influential teaching. His works cover a wide range of disciplines, including fiqh (jurisprudence), tafsīr (Qur'anic exegesis), ʿaqīdah (creed), and spiritual ethics, reflecting the intellectual and moral concerns of his era. Among his many contributions, his Tafsīr al-Samarqandī (also known as Baḥr al-ʿUlūm) stands as his most celebrated and enduring work, a comprehensive commentary that combines traditional reports with linguistic, theological, and juristic insights. Through his writings and teachings, Abū al-Layth al-Samarqandī profoundly shaped the development of Hanafi thought and remains a revered figure in the Islamic scholarly tradition.

== Political climate ==
The political and social circumstances in which Abu al-Layth lived, the weakening of central authority, and the successive disturbances that afflicted the Abbasid realm — including the fresh seditions and unrest that occurred in Baghdad — and the consequent transformations in public life and the formation of new social patterns. He lived during the second Abbasid era, which was marked by both cultural flourishing and internal political weakness. His life stretched across the period in which the rule of the Abbasids began to lose control over the eastern provinces beyond Khurasan.

During his lifetime, the region was influenced by the rise of the Samanid dynasty (204–395 AH / 819–1005 CE), who ruled in Transoxiana and Khurasan. This coincided with a series of List of Abbasid caliphs: al-Muqtadir (295–320 AH), al-Qahir (320–322 AH), al-Radi (322–329 AH), al-Muttaqi (329–333 AH), and al-Mustakfi (333–334 AH). It is clear that there was a tense and shifting relationship between the Abbasids and the Samanids during this period, and Abu al-Layth lived within that political environment.

Historically, the Samanid rulers gained great influence in the eastern lands of Islam, and the Abbasid caliphs in Baghdad were often forced to recognize their autonomy. The Samanids enjoyed respect and prestige because of their sponsorship of scholars, poets, and jurists, and their courts became centers of learning and literature.

== Early life ==
=== Birth ===
Imam Abu al-Layth was born and raised in the city of Samarqand. The authors of the ṭabaqāt (biographical dictionaries) and historians differ over the exact year of his birth. Some suggest, based on probability, that his birth occurred between the years 300–310 AH.

=== Education ===
He began his studies with his father. His main teacher in fiqh was Abu Ja'far al-Hinduvani of Balkh, famously known as "Little Abu Hanifa." In addition to Hanafi fiqh, he also studied hadith, theology and tafsir. Besides Samarkand, Balkh and Bukhara, he went to Baghdad and there met Muhammad ibn Muhammad ibn He narrated hadith from Sahl al-Nisapuri, and Ali ibn Ahmad al-Razzaz narrated from him.

=== Teachers ===
He received his learning from many notable shaykhs of his era. Among them were:

- His father, Muhammad ibn Ahmad ibn Ibrahim al-Samarqandi.
- Muhammad ibn al-Fadl al-Balkhī (d. 319 AH).
- Abu Nasr Ahmad ibn Muhammad al-Jurjānī (d. 365 AH).
- Isḥāq ibn Aḥmad al-Qāḍī (d. 350 AH).
- Muḥammad ibn al-Ḥasan al-Ḥaddādī (d. 370 AH).

== Scholarly life ==
=== Career ===
He did not hold the office of judge (qāḍī) but was known as a jurist, preacher (khutbah), and teacher who issued fatwās and provided public religious instruction. Many scholars benefited from his writings and lessons, and he had a great circle of students, jurists, and companions who learned from him and transmitted his knowledge.

=== Students ===
Among his students:

- Muḥammad ibn ʿAbd al-Karīm al-Tirmidhī (d. ?).
- Luqmān ibn Ḥakīm al-Farghānī (d. ?).
- Nuʿaym al-Khaṣīb Abū Mālik (d. ?).
- Aḥmad ibn Muḥammad Abū Sahl (d. 340 AH).
- Abū ʿAbd Allāh Shaykh ibn Muḥammad al-Ḥaddādī (d. ?).

== Death ==
Abu al-Layth died on Tuesday, the 10th of Shaʿbān, 373 AH (983 CE), at the age of seventy-three years. He was buried in Samarqand, and his grave is known and visited by the people of that city.

== Legacy ==
Abū al-Layth played an important role in the transmission of the theological texts written by Abū Ḥanīfa and some of his students, as well as in the adoption of these teachings in regions where the Ḥanafī school was dominant. His views on theology (kalām) are, in general, parallel to the Māturīdī line. Many authors have considered Abū al-Layth a mujtahid in legal issues within the hierarchy of Ḥanafī jurists, and he made significant contributions to the development of the Ḥanafī school. By composing one of the first concise Ḥanafī compendiums, he advanced the systematic structure of Ḥanafī jurisprudence, and through his works in the field of khilāf (comparative jurisprudence), he laid the foundations of the Ḥanafī khilāf literature.

Abū al-Layth also played a key role in the transmission of the views of Abū Ḥanīfa and his disciples, and he is considered the author who undertook the most important compilations concerning nādīr al-riwāya (rare legal reports). Moreover, the earliest example in the history of the Ḥanafī school of the nawāzil literature—which aimed to compile the opinions and contributions of jurists who came after the founding imams of the school—belongs to Abū al-Layth. Thanks to this work, the views of many important Ḥanafī jurists who lived in the 3rd (9th) and 4th (10th) centuries were transmitted to later generations.

== Works ==
Abū al-Layth authored works in various fields, though many books have been attributed to him that he did not actually write—an issue that is also reflected in library catalogues. Some of his genuine works include:

1. Tafsir al-Samarqandi – An early classical commentary on the Quran.
2. Ḫizānat al-Fiqh – One of the earliest Ḥanafī legal compendia, published by Ṣalāḥ al-Dīn al-Nāhī together with ʿUyūn al-Masāʾil (Baghdad, 1385–1387/1965–1967).
3. ʿUyūn al-Masāʾil – A collection of legal opinions of Abū Ḥanīfa and his disciples outside the ẓāhir al-riwāya corpus. It serves as an important early source for the development of Ḥanafī jurisprudence. Abu al-Layth occasionally inserted his own views at the end of the narrations (ed. ʿAbd al-Razzāq al-Qādirī, Hyderabad 1960; Ṣalāḥ al-Dīn al-Nāhī, Baghdad 1965–1967; Sayyid Muḥammad Muhannā, Beirut 1998). A commentary on the work was written by ʿAlāʾ al-Dīn al-Usmendī under the title Sharḥ ʿUyūn al-Masāʾil wa-Ḥaṣr al-Masāʾil wa-Qaṣr al-Dalāʾil (MS: al-Maktabah al-Azhariyyah, al-Rāfiʿī, no. 26819; Rampur Raza Library, no. 2206). Confusion over this commentary and similar titles led to later misattributions.
4. Al-Nawāzil (al-Fatāwā) – The titles al-Fatāwā, al-Nawāzil min al-Fatāwā, Fatāwā al-Nawāzil, and Mukhtārāt al-Nawāzil refer to the same work, though it has circulated under different names. The Fatāwā al-Nawāzil printed in Hyderabad (1936) and attributed to Abu al-Layth is not his authentic work.
5. Muqaddima fī al-Ṣalāt – Also called Muqaddimat Abī al-Lays or al-Muqaddima fī al-Fiqh. It covers the rules of prayer and other related religious matters. It inspired several commentaries, including Ḥasan al-Ṭulūnī’s Sharḥ Muqaddimat Abī al-Lays fī al-Fiqh and Muṣliḥ al-Dīn b. Muṣṭafā b. Aydoghmush’s al-Tawḍīḥ ʿalā Muqaddimat al-Ṣalāt li-Abī al-Lays. Tāj al-Dīn b. ʿArabshāh versified the work.
6. Kitāb al-Mukhtalaf fī al-Fiqh bayna Abī Ḥanīfa wa-Aṣḥābih – Also known as al-Mukhtalaf bayn al-Aṣḥāb or Mukhtalaf al-Aṣḥāb. This work discusses legal disagreements among early Ḥanafī jurists, occasionally comparing their opinions with those of al-Shāfiʿī and others. Two manuscripts survive: Beyazıt State Library (no. 2167, dated 457 AH) and Topkapı Palace Museum, III Ahmad (no. 1197, dated 754 AH). A critical edition was published by Aḥmad Muḥammad Luṭfī Aḥmad as al-Mukhtalaf fī al-Fiqh bayna Abī Ḥanīfa wa-Aṣḥābih (Beirut 1444/2023). The Mukhtalaf al-Riwāya attributed to Abu al-Layth by Mubārak al-Faraj (Riyadh 1426/2005) actually belongs to al-Usmendī.
7. Bayān ʿAqīdat al-Uṣūl – A concise creed outlining the tenets of Ahl al-Sunnah in the form of the ʿamantu. It became popular in Southeast Asia (Indonesia, Malaysia) and South Africa, where it was translated into local languages. Due to its influence, it was edited and published by A. W. Juynboll (Leiden, 1881).
8. Tanbīh al-Ghāfilīn (Tanbīh al-Ṣāfilīn) – A popular work of moral exhortation and devotional advice based on Prophetic traditions and sayings of the early pious generation (Salaf). It discusses creed, worship, ethics, virtues of the Qur'ān and Ramaḍān, and social duties. The text was widely circulated, translated into Aljamiado (the Romance dialect of Muslim Spain), and frequently reprinted (Cairo 1311; Calcutta 1869; Bombay 1304; Beirut 1403/1983). Bustān al-ʿĀrifīn – Another collection of sermons and ethical reflections in the same style as Tanbīh al-Ghāfilīn (Calcutta 1868; Istanbul 1286, 1289, 1296; Būlāq 1289; Damascus 1985).
9. ʿUqūbat Ahl al-Kabāʾir – A treatise on the punishment of major sinners (ed. Muṣṭafā ʿAbd al-Qādir ʿAṭā, Beirut 1405/1983; Baghdad 1989).

== See also ==
- List of Maturidis

== Sources ==
- Washiar Ali Husayna (31 January 2024). "Imam Abu Al-Layth Al-Samarqandi (d. 375 AH) and his Approach to his Interpretation (Bahr Al-Ulum)". Islamic Science Journal. 14 (9). University of Tikrit: 297–323. doi:10.25130/jis.23.14.9.1.15.
- Muhammad Haron (1994). "Abū'l-Layth al-Samarqandī's Life and Works with Special Reference to His "Al-Muqaddimah"". Islamic Studies. 33 (2). Islamic Research Institute: 319–340. ISSN 0578-8072. JSTOR 20840171.
