= Al-Jassas =

Islamic scholar of the Hanafi school (917–981)

Imam Al-Jaṣṣāṣ
- الجصاص

Personal life
- Born: 917 Rayy
- Died: 981 (aged 63–64) Baghdad
- Era: Islamic Golden Age
- Region: Iraq
- Main interest(s): Fiqh, Tafsir
- Notable work: Aḥkām al-Qur'ān
- Occupation: Scholar, Jurist, Mufassir

Religious life
- Religion: Islam
- Denomination: Mu'tazila
- Jurisprudence: Hanafi

Muslim leader
- Influenced by: Wasil ibn Ata Abu Hanifa

Abū Bakr Aḥmad ibn ʿAlī al-Rāzī (Arabic: أبو بكر أحمد بن علي الرازي), widely known as al-Jaṣṣāṣ (Arabic: الجصاص; 370–305 AH/ 917–981 CE), was a leading Hanafi jurist and Qurʾān exegete in Baghdad of his time. Serving as the Mufti of Iraq, he is best known for authoring Aḥkām al-Qur'ān.

== Early life ==
=== Birth ===
He was born at the year 305 AH (917 CE) in Rayy, a city near present-day Tehran, capital city of Iran.

=== Education ===
Abū Bakr al-Jaṣṣāṣ grew up in Rayy. where he studied under the scholars of the city. Later, he travelled in search of higher learning. He left Rayy for Baghdad, where he studied under prominent scholars such as al-Ḥajjāj and al-Kharīkh, among others. When famine struck Baghdad, he moved to al-Ahwāz, but later returned to Baghdad after the situation improved. He then travelled to Nishapur, where he met the judge of Nishapur, Abū al-Ḥasan al-Kārikh, and consulted with him.

=== Teachers ===
He studied under many prominent scholars of his era, including:

- Abū Suhayl al-Sajjād al-Thānī
- Abū al-Ḥasan al-Karkhī, a leading Hanafi jurist of his time.
- Sahl ibn Aḥmad al-Ṭabarī
- al-Khabbāz ibn Thaʿlab
- Abū al-ʿAbbās al-Muṣʿab
- al-Ḥākim al-Nīshābūrī
- ʿAbd Allāh ibn ʿAbd al-ʿAzīz al-Bahāʾīnī
- Abū al-Ḥasan Ibrāhīm ibn ʿAlī al-Shīrāzī

== Scholarly life ==
=== Career ===
After completing his studies in Nishapur, he returned to Baghdad in 343 AH (954 CE) and assumed the position of a teacher and senior scholar (shaykh al-taʿlīm). Al-Khaṭīb notes that Abū Bakr al-Jaṣṣāṣ exemplified piety and integrity, as he twice declined the appointment to the high office of chief judge (qāḍī al-quḍāt), choosing instead to distance himself from worldly authority.

=== Students ===
Many scholars and jurists studied under Imām al-Jaṣṣāṣ, among them:

- Imām Abū Jaʿfar al-Nasafī
- Abū al-Ḥasan al-Safarāʾīnī
- Abū Bakr ibn Mūsā al-Khwārazmī
- Abū al-Faraj ibn al-Masmānah

== Death ==
Abū Bakr al-Jaṣṣāṣ al-Rāzī died on a Sunday in the month of Shaʿbān, in the year 370 AH (980 CE). He was buried in Khwarazm.

== Reception ==
Al-Yarlī said in his biographical record: “Aḥmad ibn ʿAlī al-Rāzī, Abū Bakr al-Jaṣṣāṣ, was among the virtuous scholars of al-Ray. He resided in Baghdad, where he died. The leadership of the Hanafī school ended with him.”

Al-Khaṭīb al-Baghdādī said: “He was an imām among the companions of Abū Ḥanīfa in knowledge and understanding. He was well-known for piety and integrity.”

Ibn Khallikān said: “Abū Bakr al-Rāzī, Aḥmad ibn ʿAlī ibn Ḥasan al-Imām al-Ḥāfiẓ, was among the eminent scholars of Nīshāpūr and one of the imams of the Hanafī school. He heard ḥadīth and transmitted it from many scholars.”

== Doctrine ==
Abū Bakr al-Jaṣṣāṣ is often described as having shown an inclination toward Muʿtazilī thought, particularly in certain theological interpretations found in his Aḥkām al-Qurʾān. For example, in his exegesis of Qurʾān 6:103, he asserted that God cannot be seen even in the Hereafter, interpreting texts that suggest otherwise figuratively. He likewise rejected the literal reality of sorcery, viewing it as illusion and deceit, and dismissed reports that the Prophet had been bewitched as fabricated. These positions reflect a rationalist tendency that aligns with Muʿtazilī reasoning, leading some to associate him with the school.

== Books ==
Imam al-Jaṣṣāṣ produced abundant scholarly works filled with valuable insights and contributions to Islamic jurisprudence and theology. He also wrote numerous commentaries and summaries, following the method of eminent scholars of the Hanafī school. Among his important works are:

1. 'Aḥkām al-Qur'ān' – The well-known and celebrated book authored by him.
2. Uṣūl al-Fiqh, titled al-Fuṣūl fī al-Uṣūl, published by the Kuwait Ministry of Awqaf and Islamic Affairs, edited by Dr. Jaʿfar Jumʿa.
3. A treatise on the issue of “al-Qurūʾ” (the waiting period of women after divorce).
4. A commentary on the Mukhtaṣar of his teacher Abū al-Ḥasan al-Karkhī.
5. A commentary on the Mukhtaṣar of al-Ṭaḥāwī.
6. A commentary on al-Jāmiʿ al-Kabīr by Muḥammad al-Shaybānī.
7. A commentary on al-Siyar al-Ḥasan.
8. A summary of Ikhtilāf al-Fuqahāʾ (The Disagreement of the Jurists) by al-Ṭaḥāwī — a well-known and printed book, published by Majmaʿ al-Buḥūth al-ʿIlmiyya in Islamabad, Pakistan, and also repeatedly printed by Dār al-Kutub al-ʿIlmiyya in Beirut.
9. A commentary and explanation of al-Qāḍī ʿAbd Allāh's work written by Imām Abū Yūsuf.
10. A commentary on al-Manāsik by Muḥammad al-Shaybānī.
11. A book on al-Ribā (usury).
12. A commentary on the Athār of al-Ṭaḥāwī by al-Ṭaḥāwī.

== Bibliography ==
- Sardar Ali; Imdad Ullah (10 December 2023). "Introduction to Imam Al-Jassas Al Raazi and his Methodology in Tafseer Ahkam-ul-Quran". Sareer A Khama Bi-Anual Research Journal. 2 (3): 1–12. eISSN 3005-947X. ISSN 3005-9461.
