= Abu Bakr ibn al-Arabi =

Andalusian judge and scholar (1076–1148)

- أبو بكر بن العربى

Personal life
- Born: 468H/1076
- Died: 543H/ 1148
- Region: Andalusian scholar
- Notable work(s): Ahkam al-Qur'an (Rulings of the Qur'an), Al-'Awasim min al-Qawasim (Protection against the Destruction)

Religious life
- Religion: Islam
- Jurisprudence: Maliki
- Creed: Ashari

Muslim leader
- Influenced by: Al-Ghazali

Abu Bakr ibn al-Arabi (Arabic: أبو بكر بن العربى; c. 1076–1148) was a Muslim qadi and scholar of Maliki law from al-Andalus. Like Al-Mu'tamid ibn Abbad, Ibn al-Arabi was forced to migrate to what is now Morocco during the reign of the Almoravids. It is reported that he was a student of al-Ghazali. He was a master of Maliki Jurisprudence. His father was a student of Ibn Hazm. He also contributed to the spread of Ash'ari theology in al-Andalus. A detailed biography about him was written by his contemporary Qadi Ayyad (d. 1149), the Malikite scholar and judge from Ceuta.

== Biography ==
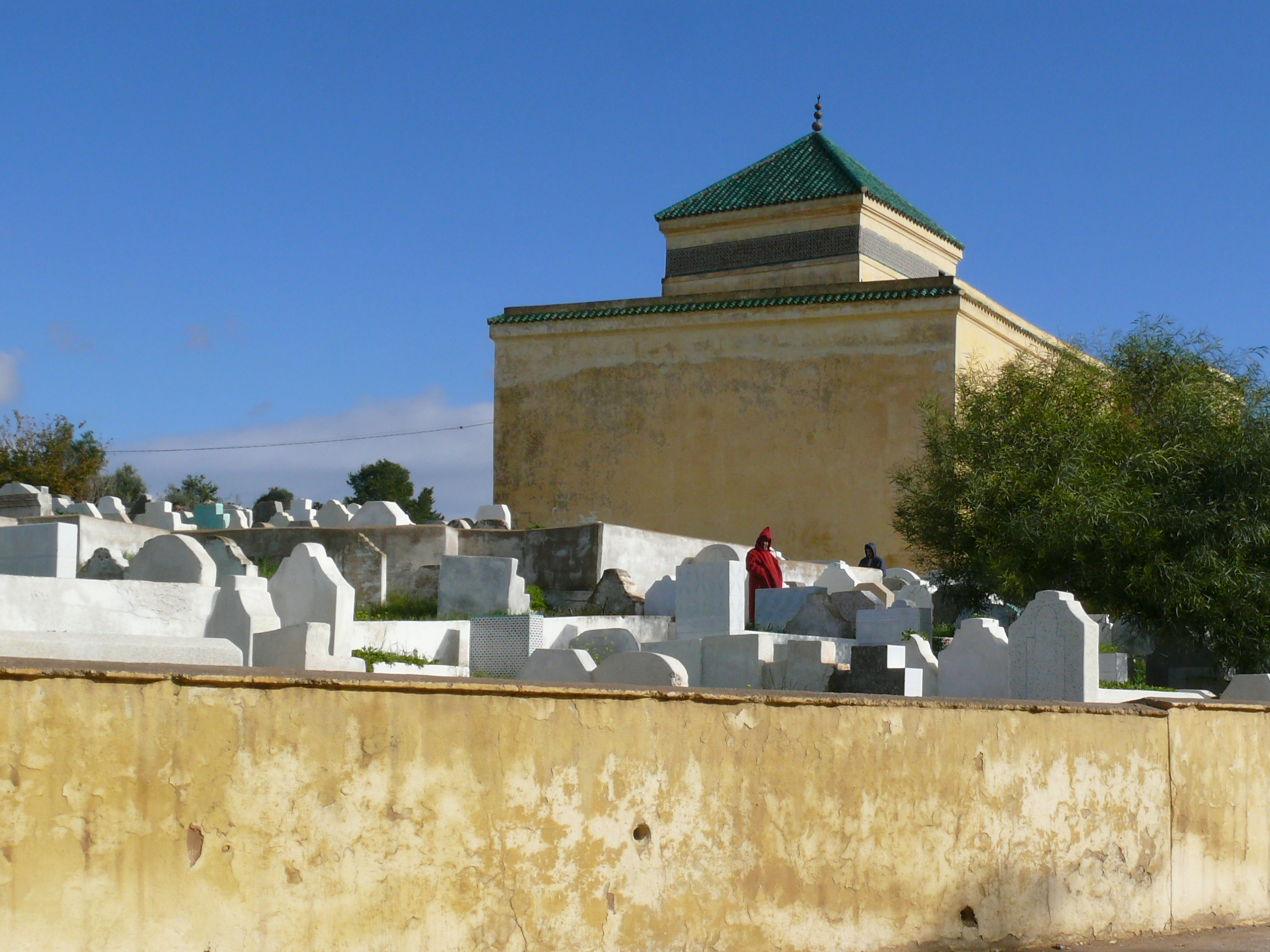
Grave of Ibn al-Arabi in the Bab Mahrouk Cemetery in Fez.

Abu Bakr Ibn al-'Arabi was a "Andalusian Malikite qadi". He was born in Seville, Al-Andalus. Ibn al-'Arabi's father (Abu Muhammad ibn al-'Arabi) was a high ranking statesman working for the Taifa king of Seville, al-Mu'tamid ibn 'Abbad (r. 1069-1091). However, in 1091 when Al-Andalus was taken over by the Almoravids, Ibn al-'Arabi (then 16 years old) and his father decided to leave for a less turbulent setting (his father also had political motivations). The two al-'Arabis travelled by ship to Egypt, and from there they travelled to Jerusalem where they stayed from 1093 to 1096.

Al-'Arabi devoted himself to his studies, teaching and writing. He wrote many books on several different subjects, including hadith, fiqh, usul, Qur'an studies, adab, grammar and history. One of his works was the Book on the Arrangement of the Travel that Raised my Interests in Religions and Experiences of the Great Authorities and Eminent People by the Observer of Islam and the Various Lands. Ibn al-'Arabi also wrote The Rule of Interpretation, and Protective Guards Against Strong Objections (a source of comments that al-Ghazali made to his students). Two of al-'Arabi's books (Tartib al-rohla li al-targhib fi al-millah and Qanun al-ta'wil) provided descriptions of the al-Arabi's travels, and specifically recounted religious life in the holy city of Jerusalem. These accounts are important, as they may be the only eyewitness accounts by a Muslim in Jerusalem during the Seljuq period. They also provide a critical Muslim perspective.

After leaving Jerusalem in 1096, both al'-Arabis' travelled to Damascus and Baghdad to study. They settled in Baghdad and returned there after they took pilgrimage. While in Jerusalem, Ibn al-'Arabi was fascinated by all of the scholars he met there, and performing the hajj became an element in his quest for knowledge. It was only when he returned to Baghdad in 1097 that Ibn al-'Arabi finally met Imam Abū Ḥāmed al-Ghazālī, an Islamic theologian, philosopher and Sufi mystic. Ibn al-'Arabi studied with him, beginning at the age of 21.

Ibn al-'Arabi took a close and strong interest in al-Ghazali's teachings. As a result, Ibn al-'Arabi is said to be one of the "most important sources of information about al-Ghazali's life and his teachings". When it came to al-Ghazali's theology, Ibn al-'Arabi became a master, and was enthusiastic, but perhaps more importantly critical of his teachings. Although Ibn al-'Arabi undoubtedly respected al-Ghazali, he was not afraid to express his feelings of difference when it came to the teachings of falsafa (Islamic philosophy).

After his father died in 1099 (at age 57), Ibn al-'Arabi, then aged 26, headed back to Seville. After being away from Seville for 10 years studying in the Muslim east, he was considered an esteemed and highly regarded scholar and teacher, as well as a respected source in spreading the works and teachings of al-Ghazali in the Muslim west. Ibn al-'Arabi continued to study, reflect upon and challenge the works of al-Ghazali. For example, al-Ghazali believed that, "there is not in the sphere of possibility anything more excellent, more perfect or more complete than what God has in fact created". However Ibn al-'Arabi argued that there is a limitation of God's power. This view can be seen in some of Ibn al-'Arabi's works. For example, there were times when Muslim judges and lawyers faced the situation where there was no legal text or scripture to help provide an insight or guidance on a judicial decision. In these cases, judges and lawyers had to use their best discretion to determine the rule of law. Laws of slander came into question, and defining the punishment as a right of God or a private right were debated. While Ibn al-'Arabi recognized that there are two views on whether the right was of God or a private right, ultimately he felt that the crime should largely be seen as a private right, as it was conditioned by the victim filing a petition.

Ibn al-'Arabi reflected upon the nature of the soul and the study and theory of knowledge. Ibn al-'Arabi studied the Sufi argument that knowledge can only be achieved through purity of the soul, chastening of the heart, and an overall unity between the body and the heart, as well as removal from material motives. Ibn al-'Arabi argued that this was an extreme position. Rather he believed that there was no connection between the knowledge a person acquired and any sacred or devout acts that his soul has performed.

Ibn al-'Arabi used his knowledge of the soul in his studies of law and ethics. For example, when discussing abortion, Madhhab judgements differ considerably. Malikis and Hanafis tend to take opposite positions on this issue. Malikis generally forbid induced miscarriage after conception, as this was seen to be the point at which the soul was breathed into the unborn child. On the other hand, Hanafis held that "induced miscarriage was not punishable until the 120th day of conception". Ibn al-'Arabi tried to bridge the gap between the Maliki and the Hanafi opinions by "granting greater protection rights to the embryo after ensoulment", although ultimately he did not succeed in bridging this gap.

Ibn al-'Arabi wrote on many other subjects. For instance, he wrote on the mistreatment and disciplining of women. He once wrote, "The [slaves] need to be disciplined with a stick, while the [free man] will not need more than an indication. Among women and even men, there are those who will behave well only through correction (adab). Any man who knows it has to resort to discipline [his wife], although it is preferable if he abstains from it." However, it seems that Ibn al-'Arabi was more focused on trying to express "beating in a non-violent way". He believed that this is the "only way allowed by the divine revelation", because the objective of beating in a non-violent way was ultimately to improve the wife's behaviour.

Although Abu Bakr ibn al-'Arabi may have some critics, he was generally a highly acclaimed authority on hadith, and was regarded as being trustworthy and reliable.

== Works ==
His Major works are:

- Commentary on Tirmidhi's Hadith Collection (book) known as "'Aridhat al-Ahwazi'".
- Commentary on the Quran known as Ahkam al-Qur'an. It contains commentary on the legal rulings of the Qur'an according to the Maliki school.
- Al-'Awasim min al-Qawasim (العواصم من القواصم) or "Defence Against Disaster", is a history book that became famous for his strong reply against the Shia.
