= Dar Al-Kotob Al-Ilmiyah =

Lebanese publishing house

- Official logo
- Status: Active
- Founded: 1971; 55 years ago
- Founder: Mohammad Ali Baydoun
- Country of origin: Lebanon
- Headquarters location: Beirut, Lebanon
- Distribution: Worldwide
- Key people: Mohammad Ali Baydoun (Director General)
- Publication types: Books
- Nonfiction topics: Islamic studies, Arabic language, literature, history
- Fiction genres: Academic, religious, linguistic
- Owner: Mohammad Ali Baydoun
- Official website: www.al-ilmiyah.com

Dar Al-Kotob Al-Ilmiyah (Arabic: دار الكتب العلمية), also written as Dar al-Kutub al-Ilmiyah, is a Beirut-based publishing house founded in 1971 by Muhammad Ali Baydoun. It is regarded as one of the earliest and most active publishing houses in the Arab and Islamic worlds, specialising in classical Arabic and Islamic heritage works, academic publications, and translations into several international languages.

== History ==
Dar Al-Kotob Al-Ilmiyah was founded in 1971 in Beirut by Muhammad Ali Baydoun, who continues to manage the company. Before establishing the press, Baydoun had worked in the Lebanese publishing sector, gaining experience in management and finance. From its inception, the publisher specialised in editing, printing, and distributing works of Islamic scholarship, Arabic language studies, and classical literature.

Over the decades, the publisher has expanded into one of Lebanon’s largest private printing enterprises, operating an in-house press and binding workshop to maintain production during times of political instability, including the Lebanese Civil War and subsequent conflicts. Its catalogue reportedly exceeds 10,000 titles, with approximately 400 new works released annually.

The publisher’s editorial focus includes critical editions of classical Islamic manuscripts, studies in theology, jurisprudence, hadith, Arabic linguistics, and history. The publisher has also issued numerous translated works in English, French, and Spanish to reach non-Arabic-speaking audiences. According to Baydoun, the press follows a methodology in which specialist scholars and editors prepare and verify manuscripts according to their jurisprudential or linguistic discipline.

The publisher maintains a private archive of over 100,000 manuscript copies collected from libraries and academic institutions worldwide. These materials serve as reference sources for its ongoing publication of critical editions and reprints of classical works.

In addition to its focus on classical and Islamic heritage texts, the publisher has also cooperated with contemporary scholars and universities in publishing modern linguistic and academic studies. In 2018, the publisher issued two works by Mohammad Jawad Al-Nouri of An-Najah National University, including al-Tafkīr al-Ṣawtī ʿinda Sibawayh fī ḍawʾ ʿIlm al-Lughah al-Ḥadīth and a translation of A. F. L. Beeston's The Arabic Language Today.

The publisher has also been a regular exhibitor at the Beirut Arab International Book Fair, where in 2013 its representative Mazen Baydoun discussed the impact of Lebanon’s political situation on book sales and readership trends.

== Distribution and influence ==
The publisher distributes through regional book fairs and online platforms, including Google Books, Jamalon, Neelwafurat, and Amazon, as well as through bookstores across the Middle East and internationally. Its editions are cited in a wide range of academic research, including studies published in international journals and scholarly analyses of classical Islamic texts.

In 2024, the Lebanese publishing sector faced severe disruptions due to regional conflict and bombardments that destroyed warehouses and printing facilities. Reports from the period noted that publishers in southern Beirut, including major houses, faced significant material losses and logistical difficulties in production and export.

== Reputation and impact ==
The publisher's editions of classical Islamic and Arabic texts are frequently used in academic research. A study by the Al Jazeera Center for Studies, titled Asylum in Islamic Historiography and the International and Arab Legal Systems (Arabic: اللجوء في التراث الإسلامي ومنظومة القانون الدولي والعربي), cites over a hundred references from the publisher’s Beirut editions, indicating its wide scholarly circulation.

== Controversy ==
In September 2009, the publisher publicly apologized for a publishing error concerning the authorship of the book Sirāj al-Ṭālibīn, after representatives of Nahdlatul Ulama (NU) in Lebanon and Indonesia raised concerns that the work had been attributed to the wrong author. The publisher’s director, Muhammad Ali Baydoun, delivered a formal apology to NU authorities through its Lebanon branch.
