= Al-Qurtubi =

Andalusian jurist and Islamic scholar (1214–1273)

Abū ʿAbd Allāh al-Qurṭubī
- أبو عبد الله القرطبي

Personal life
- Born: 1214; Córdoba, Emirate of Taifa, Andalus
- Died: 29 April 1273; Egypt
- Era: Islamic golden age
- Region: Andalus
- Main interest(s): Tafsir, fiqh and hadith

Religious life
- Religion: Islam
- Denomination: Sunni
- Jurisprudence: Maliki
- Creed: Ash'ari
- Arabic name
- Personal (Ism): Muḥammad
- Patronymic (Nasab): ibn Aḥmad ibn Abī Bakr ibn Faraj
- Teknonymic (Kunya): Abū ʿAbd Allāh
- Toponymic (Nisba): al-Anṣārī al-Khazrajī al-Qurṭubī al-Andalusī

Abū ʿAbd Allāh al-Qurṭubī (Arabic: أبو عبدالله القرطبي; 1214 – 29 April 1273) was an Arab Andalusian Sunni Muslim polymath, Maliki jurisconsult, mufassir, muhaddith and an expert in the Arabic language. Prominent scholars of Córdoba, Spain, taught him, and he is well known for his classical commentary of the Quran named Tafsir al-Qurtubi.

== Biography ==
He was born into an Arab family in Qurtubah (modern-day Córdoba), Al-Andalus, in the 13th century. His father was a farmer and died during a Spanish attack in 1230. During his youth, he contributed to his family by carrying clay for use in potteries. He finished his education in Qurtubah (Córdoba), studying from renowned scholars Ibn Abu Hujja and Abdurrahman ibn Ahmed Al-Ashari. After the fall of Cordoba in 1236, he left for Alexandria, where he studied hadith and tafsir. He then passed to Cairo and settled in Munya Abi'l-Khusavb, where he spent the rest of his life. In Egypt, he studied under notable teachers, including Aḥmad b. ʿUmar b. Ibrāhīm al-Qurṭubī, better known as Ibn al-Muzayyin (578–656/1182–1258), with whom he is sometimes confused; ʿAbd al-Muʿṭī b. Muḥammad al-Iskandarānī; Abū al-Ḥasan ʿAlī b. Hibat Allāh al-Lakhmī; and others.

Known for his modesty and humble lifestyle, he was buried in Munya Abi'l-Khusavb, Egypt, in 1273. His grave was carried to a mosque where a mausoleum was built under his name in 1971, still open for visiting today.

== Views ==
He was very skilled in commentary, narrative, recitation and law, which is evident in his writings, and the depth of his scholarship has been recognized by many scholars. In his works, Qurtubi defended the Sunni point of view and criticised the Mu'tazilah.

== Reception ==
The hadith scholar Dhahabi said of him, "...he was an imam versed in numerous branches of scholarship, an ocean of learning whose works testify to the wealth of his knowledge, the width of his intelligence and his superior worth."

Ibn Farḥūn said of him, “He was among the righteous servants of God — a learned scholar, knowledgeable, scrupulous, and ascetic in worldly matters; preoccupied with what concerned him of the affairs of the Hereafter. His time was fully occupied between devotion, worship, and writing.”

Ibn al-ʿImād said of him, “He was a learned imam, one who delved deeply into the meanings of hadith, skilled in composition, and precise in transmission.”

Muḥammad Makhlūf said of him:, “The learned imam — distinguished, virtuous, jurist, exegete, accomplished scholar, meticulous, and complete — he was among the righteous servants of God and the scholars who acted upon their knowledge.”

Islamic scholar Nuh Ha Mim Keller said of him:

Imam Qurtubi is Muhammad ibn Ahmad ibn Abu Bakr ibn Farah, Abu Abdullah al-Ansari al-Qurtubi, of Cordova (in present-day Spain). A Maliki scholar and hadith specialist, he was one of the greatest Imams of Koranic exegesis, an ascetic who divided his days between worship and writing. Educated in hadith by masters like Ali ibn Muhammad al-Yahsabi and al-Hasan ibn Muhammad al-Bakri, he wrote works in the sciences of hadith and tenets of faith. However, his enduring contribution is his twenty volume al-Jami li Ahkam al-Qur’an [The compendium of the rules of the Koran], from which he mainly omitted the stories and histories customary in other commentaries, and recorded instead the legal rulings contained in the Koran and how scholars have inferred them, together with canonical readings (qira’at), Arabic grammar, and which verses abrogate others and which are abrogated (nasikh wa mansukh). Scholars have used it extensively ever since it was written. It is related to Qurtubi's disdainful airs, and how he used to walk about in a simple caftan with a plain cap (taqiyya) on his head. He travelled east and settled in Munya Abi al-Khusayb in upper Egypt, where he died in 671/1273

== Works ==
1. Tafsīr al-Qurṭubī: The most important and famous of his works, this 20-volume commentary has raised great interest and has had many editions. It is often referred to as al-Jamī' li-'Aḥkām, meaning "All the Judgements." Contrary to what this name implies, the commentary is not limited to verses dealing with legal issues, but is a general interpretation of the Quran with a Maliki point of view. Any claims made about a verse are stated and thoroughly investigated.
2. al-Tadhkirah fī Aḥwāl al-Mawtà wa-Umūr al-Ākhirah (Reminder of the Conditions of the Dead and the Matters of the Hereafter): a book dealing with the topics of death, the punishments of the grave, the end times and the day of resurrection
3. Al-Asnà fi Sharḥ al-Asmā' al-Ḥusnà
4. Kitāb ut-Tadhkār fi Afḍal il-Adhkār
5. Kitab Sharḥ it-Taqaṣṣi
6. Kitab Qam' il-Ḥirṣ biz-Zuhd wal-Qanā'ah: Ibn Farḥūn said: “I have not come across a work better than it in its field.”
7. At-Takrāb li-Kitāb it-Tamhīd
8. al-Mufhim lima Ushkila min Talkhis Sahih Muslim
9. Faḍāʾil al-Qurʾān wa-adab al-tilāwa (“Merits of the Qurʾān and of the art of Qurʾānic recitation”)
10. Kitāb al-tadhkira fī aḥwāl al-mawtā wa-umūr al-ākhira/aḥwāl al-ukhrā (“The reminder about the circumstances of the deceased and issues of the afterlife”). Judging by the large number of extant manuscripts and its many modern editions, this was an extremely popular work on Islamic eschatology, second only to the Jāmiʿ. It is divided into 288 chapters on subjects such as preparing for death, funerals, selecting land for burial, visiting graves, the permissibility of weeping, the torments of the grave, martyrdom, and the conditions of Paradise and Hell.

== See also ==
- List of Ash'aris and Maturidis
- List of Islamic scholars
