= Ahkam al-Qur'an (al-Jassas) =

Islamic juridical exegesis

- Editor: Abdul Salam & Muhammad Ali Shahin
- Author: Abū Bakr al-Jaṣṣāṣ
- Original title: أحكام القرآن
- Language: Arabic
- Genre: Tafsir
- Publisher: Dar Al-Kotob Al-Ilmiyah
- Publication date: 2020
- Publication place: Beirut, Lebanon
- Pages: 1952
- ISBN: 978-2-7451-0246-1

Aḥkām al-Qurʾān (Arabic: أحكام القرآن, lit. 'Rulings of the Qur'an') by Abū Bakr al-Jaṣṣāṣ al-Rāzī (d. 370/981) is one of the earliest works in the field of legal Qur'anic exegesis and the most important within the Ḥanafī school. In this work, al-Jaṣṣāṣ focuses on verses containing legal rulings, interpreting them through the lens of Ḥanafī jurisprudence. His systematic approach and juristic analysis made the work a foundational reference for later scholars in both tafsīr and Islamic law.

== Background ==
Al-Jaṣṣāṣ al-Rāzī authored his commentary and set forth his discussion of the legal rulings of the Qur'an in accordance with the principles and foundations of the Ḥanafī school. Al-Jaṣṣāṣ himself placed two introductions at the beginning of his book. One on the principles of Tawḥīd (monotheism) another on the principles of deduction and inference (istinbāṭ). He says:

“We have prefaced this book with an introduction that clarifies, as briefly as possible, what must not be ignored concerning the fundamentals of Tawḥīd, and another introduction explaining the methods of deriving rulings from the Qurʾān, extracting its proofs and evidences, as well as the manner of reasoning and inference in matters of divine law, language, and philosophical terminology. For the science of Tawḥīd is the foundation of all sciences and disciplines, and every knowledge proceeds from its core and essence.”

== Methodology ==
Aḥkâm al-Qur'ān is one of the earliest works focused on the legal injunctions (ahkâm) of the Qur'an and later influenced subsequent ahkâm-centered tafsirs. In the work, surahs are treated according to their Qur'anic order, but only verses containing legal injunctions are discussed; surahs without ahkâm verses are omitted. The verses are arranged under abwâb (chapters), similar to fiqh literature, according to the topics to which they pertain.

In interpreting the ahkâm, al-Jaṣṣāṣ addresses both uṣûl and furûʿ matters, drawing on Prophetic traditions (hadith), the views of the Companions and Tabi'în, the differences among the legal schools, and the evidences cited by each party. He consistently defends the Hanafî position using both transmitted (naqlî) and rational (‘aqlî) evidence, while occasionally critiquing other schools with sharp precision. This comparative approach positions the work not only as a tafsîr but also as a reference in jurisprudential debate.

The text also clarifies the circumstances of revelation (asbâb al-nuzûl), identifies abrogating and abrogated verses (nâsikh wa mansûkh), and occasionally engages in literary analysis, incorporating evidence from Arabic poetry. Owing to its comprehensive treatment of legal, textual, and linguistic aspects, Aḥkâm al-Qur'ān became a key reference for jurists, exegetes, and literary scholars in later centuries.

== Editions ==
The work exists in manuscript copies in many libraries. It was first published in three volumes by Kilisli Rifat and Kâmil Efendi (member of parliament from Karahisar, Miras), based on the manuscripts in Istanbul libraries (Istanbul, 1335–1338 AH / 1917–1920 CE), and was also printed in Cairo in 1347 AH / 1928 CE. A critical edition of the work was prepared by Muhammed Sâdık Kamhâvî (Cairo, n.d., I–V).

== See also ==
- List of tafsir works

== Sources ==
- Sardar Ali; Imdad Ullah (10 December 2023). "Introduction to Imam Al-Jassas Al Raazi and his Methodology in Tafseer Ahkam-ul-Quran". Sareer A Khama Bi-Anual Research Journal. 2 (3): 1–12. eISSN 3005-947X. ISSN 3005-9461.
- Moazzum Shah, Ghulam Hussain, Haris Saleem (3 December 2021). "A Research Study of The Principles and Rulings Of Islamic Jurisprudence Used By Al-Jassas In Ahkam Ul Quran". Journal of Islamic Studies. 2 (2): 181–192. doi:10.51665/AL-DUHAA.002.02.0110. eISSN 2710-3617. ISSN 2710-0812.
- Sakhi Rehman, Safi Ullah, Muhammad Aslam Khan (13 July 2025). "A Comparative Study of Social Problems in Surah An-Nur in Light of Ahkam Al-Quran by Al-Jassas and Ahkam Al-Quran by Al-Arabi". Advance Social Science Archive Journal. 4 (1). Scholarium Education and Research: 712–724. eISSN 3006-2500. ISSN 3006-2497.
- Şükrü Şirin (1 December 2015). "A Comparison of the Crime of Highway Robbery in the Works Entitled Ahkām al-Qur'ān by al-Jassās and Ibn al-'Arabī". Gaziosmanpaşa Üniversitesi İlahiyat Fakültesi Dergisi. 3 (2). Tokat Gaziosmanpaşa University: 47–76. eISSN 2687-4679. ISSN 2147-8422.
